= List of Chinese animated series =

This is a list of Chinese animated TV shows sorted by year. They are in Mandarin Chinese language only:

== List of Chinese animated shows in Each decade ==
=== 1980s ===
- Calabash Brothers / 葫芦兄弟 (1987)
- Kotion Each / 科提恩每个 (1988)
- Slovenly Boy's Adventure / 邋遢大王历险记 (1987)
- Black Cat Detective / 黑猫警长 (1987)

=== 1990s ===
- Abenmao
- The Blood Sword
- Cyber Weapon Z / 超神Z (1993)
- Big-Headed Kid and Small-Headed Father / 大头儿子和小头爸爸 (1995)
- Journey to the West – Legends of the Monkey King (1998)
- 3000 Whys of Blue Cat / 蓝猫淘气三千 (1999)

=== 2000s ===
- Devil Microchip / 魔鬼芯片 (2001)
- Music Up / 我为歌狂 (2001)
- As the Bell Rings
- Century Sonny
- Dinosaur Baby Holy Heroes
- Five Lucky Mouse
- Wanderings of Sanmao (2005)
- Young Go Players / 围棋少年 (2005)
- The Dreaming Girl (2005)
- The Adventures of Little Carp / 小鲤鱼历险记l (2006)
- Desire for Sky / 渴望蓝天 (2006)
- Romance of the Three Kingdoms (2009 animation)
- Fruity Robo / 果宝特攻
- GG Bond / GG邦德 (2005)
- Dentyne FIRE & ICE / 登坦火与冰 (2000)
- Homer and Landau
- Keke's Story
- The Legend of Condor Hero
- Little Cherry
- Little Soldier Zhang Ga
- The Adventures of Little Carp
- The Olympic Adventures of Fuwa
- Pleasant Goat and Big Big Wolf
- Pleasant Goat and Big Big Wolf – Pleasant Goat Sports Game
- Shalan
- Shaolin Wuzang
- SkyEye
- Tortoise Hanba's Stories
- Xingxing Fox
- Zentrix
- The Legend of Qin
- Star Cat
- Balala the Fairies
- Electro Boy

=== 2010s ===
- A.U
- AI Football GGO
- Astro Plan
- Bicycle Boy
- Boonie Bears
- Kotion Each Returns / Kotion 每个回归 (2019)
- Stride / 跨步 (2018)
- Dragon Warrior
- Vary Peri
- The Legend of Lucky Pie
- Cupid's Chocolates
- School Shock
- Pleasant Goat and Big Big Wolf
- Spirit Blade Mountain
- Bloodivores
- Nuwa Chengzhang Riji
- Happy Heroes
- Heibai Wushang The Unparalleled Black & White 黑白无双 S1 and S2 (2015,2017)
- Cheating Craft
- To Be Hero
- Abu the Little Dinosaur
- Shuangsheng Lingtan
- Chōyū Sekai
- Spiritpact
- The Silver Guardian
- Rakshasa Street 镇魂街 S1(2016) S2(2019)
- Yaoguai Mingdan
- Cinderella Chef (萌妻食神 )
- The King's Avatar (全职高手)
- Guomin Laogong Dai Huijia
- Mu Qi Ling
- Kodama
- Yeloli
- Infinity Nado
- Screechers Wild! (Opti-Morphs)
- Nana Moon
- Valt the Wonder Deer
- Maiquan & Keke
- NanoCore
- Twin Moons
- Revelation
- Nine Songs of the Moving Heavens
- Bloody Code
- Gunslayer Legend
- Stitch & Ai
- Soul Land
- Hua Jianghu Zhi Bu Liang Ren (A Portrait of Jianghu: Rivers and Lakes)
- Hua Jianghu Zhi Ling Zhu (A Portrait of Jianghu: Spirit Master / Painted Jianghu 2)
- Hua Jianghu Zhi Bei Mo Ting (A Portrait of Jianghu: Mourning Toast)
- Hua Jianghu Zhi Huanshi Mensheng
- Ling Cage: Incarnation(2019)
- Mole's World
- The Small Giant
- Year Hare Affair
- Luo Bao Bei
- Mo Dao Zu Shi, also known as Grandmaster of Demonic Cultivation (The Founder of Diabolism)
- Douluo Dalu
- P. King Duckling
- Battle Through the Heavens (Dou Puo Cang Qiong)
- There's a Pit in My Senior Martial Brother's Brain (Wo Jia Da Shi Xiong Nao Zi You Keng)
- Tales of Demons and Gods (Yao Shen Ji)
- The Young Imperial Guards
- Bringing the Nation's Husband Home (Guo Min Lao Gong Dai Hui Jia)
- Transcend the Gods: The Black Troop (Chao Shen Xue Yuan: Xiong Bing Lian)
- Zombie Brother (Shi Xiong)
- Bai Ye Ling Long
- Filly Funtasia
- My Cultivator Girlfriend (Wo De Tian Jie Nu You)
- My Holy Weapon (Wo De Nitian Shenqi)
- I am Bai Xiaofei (Wo Jia Bai Xiao Fei)
- The Devil Ring (Jie Mo Ren)
- The Legend of Luo Xiaohei / 罗小黑战记 (2011)
- Lan Mo's Flower (Lan Mo De Hua)
- Immemorial Love For You
- The Great Warrior Wall
- Jian Wang 3 – Xia Gan Yi Dan Shen Jian Xin
- Thousand Autumns
- Psychic Princess
- Busted! Darklord
- Hey, Your Ears Are Showing!
- Memories of Changan
- Miracle Star
- Kaixin Baobei / 开心宝贝 (2010)
- Jing-Ju Cats / 京剧猫 (2015)
- Ling Long: Incarnation 灵笼 (2019)
- Wings of the World 万国志(2019)

=== 2020s ===
- Buddi
- Deer Squad / 鹿队 (2020)
- Fabulous Beasts 有兽焉 (S1 2023) (S2 2023) (S3 2024) (S4 2024)
- Kung Fu Wa
- It Starts With a Kingpin Account
- Call Up Girls (unreleased)
- Under the Three Rivers
- Shang Shan
- The Chosen One
- B.King
- Action Monster Big Movie
- To Be Winner
- Li Xiongmao
- Release that Witch (2026)
- Versatile Mage (2024-present)
- Above Myriads (2025-present)
- Will Eternal (season 4)
- City God Chronicles (202?)
- Fox Spirit Matchmaker (season 13)
- Last word of the World
- Part Time immortal
- City God Chronicles
- Flower Angels: On the fragrance of magic flowers
- Nian Fanchen
- Crowned in a Hundred Days
- Star Gate
- The Chosen One season 2
- Genius Club
- Star Gate
- Call Me Lord Eerie Bailiff
- Xing Lin
- Back Alley of Guy Street
- DNF
- False Memory
- Apotheosis in Nine Acts: How I End Up Saving the World
- Raised by Demons: Panda Li

List of Chinese 2D animated series
English title	Chinese title	Style of animation	season	No. of episodes	Year of Release	Producers	Studio
Uncharted Walker	迷域行者	2D	S1	12	2018	Bilibili	Jay Zone Comic
Reborn as a Cat	为喵人生	2D/3D	S1	36	2025	Bilibili	Paper Plane Animation Studio
Fairies Albums	百妖谱	2D	S1	12	2020	Bilibili	Haoliners Animation League
Fairies Albums	百妖谱	2D	S2	12	2021	Bilibili	CMC Media
Fairies Albums	百妖谱	2D	S3	12	2022	Bilibili	CMC Media
Fairies Albums	百妖谱	2D	S4	12	2024	Bilibili	CMC Media
Fairies Albums	百妖谱	2D	S5	12	2025	Bilibili	CMC Media
Spare Me, Great Lord!	大王饶命	2D	S1	12	2021	Tencent Video	Big Firebird Culture
Spare Me, Great Lord!	大王饶命	2D	S2	12	2023	Tencent Video	Big Firebird Culture
Spare Me, Great Lord!	大王饶命	2D	S3	16	2026	Tencent Video	Big Firebird Culture
Dragon Raja: Blazing Dawn	龙族 / 龍族	2D	S1	16	2022	Tencent Video	Garden Culture
Dragon Raja: Blazing Dawn	龙族 / 龍族	2D	S2	24	2025	Tencent Video	Garden Culture
The Daily Life of the Immortal King	仙王的日常生活	2D	S1	15	2020	Bilibili	Haoliners Animation League
The Daily Life of the Immortal King	仙王的日常生活	2D	S2	12	2021	Bilibili	Pb Animation
The Daily Life of the Immortal King	仙王的日常生活	2D	S3	12	2022	Bilibili	Pb Animation
The Daily Life of the Immortal King	仙王的日常生活	2D	S4	12	2023	Bilibili	Liyu Culture
The Daily Life of the Immortal King	仙王的日常生活	2D	S5	TBA	TBA	Bilibili	Liyu Culture
The Furious Yama	大王不高兴	2D	S1	12	2020	Bilibili	Haoliners Animation League
The Furious Yama	大王不高兴	2D	S2	12	2020	Bilibili	Haoliners Animation League
Link Click	时光代理人	2D	S1	11 + 1	2021	Bilibili	LAN Studio
Link Click	时光代理人	2D	S2	12	2023	Bilibili	LAN Studio
Link Click	时光代理人	2D	ARC1	6	2024	Bilibili	CMC Media
Link Click	时光代理人	2D	S3	TBA	2026	Bilibili	TBA
Heaven Official's Blessing	官赐福	2D	S1	11 + 1	2020	Bilibili	Haoliners Animation League
Heaven Official's Blessing	官赐福	2D	S2	12	2023	Bilibili	Red Dog Culture House
Heaven Official's Blessing	官赐福	2D	Short Film	TBA	2025	Bilibili	TBA
Lord of the Mysteries	诡秘之主	2D	S1	13	2025	Tencent Video	B.CMAY Pictures
Lord of the Mysteries	诡秘之主	2D	S2	TBA	TBA	Tencent Video	TBA
The Girl Downstairs	爱上她的理由	2D	S1	22 + 1	2023-present	Bilibili	Red Dog Culture House
Rakshasa Street	镇魂街	2D	S1	24	2016	Yaoqi	L²Studio
Rakshasa Street	镇魂街	2D	S2 part 1	5	2019	Bilibili	L²Studio
Rakshasa Street	镇魂街	2D	S2 part 2	7	2021	Bilibili	L²Studio
Rakshasa Street	镇魂街	2D	S3	16	2023	Bilibili	L²Studio
Rakshasa Street	镇魂街	2D	S4	26	2024	Bilibili	L²Studio
Who Made Me a Princess		2D	S1	TBA	TBA	iQIYI	Colored Pencil Animation
The All-devouring whale homecoming	鲲吞天下之掌门归来	2D	S1	12	2025	Bilibili	Big Firebird Culture
A War between Humans and AI	暂停！智序重组	3D	S1	12	2024	Bilibili	
To Be Hero X		2D/3D	S1		2025	BIlibili	Be Dream
Mom I'm Sorry	邂逅她的少女时代	2D			2024		
Don’t Give Up	无聊就完结	2D	S1	24	2024	Bilibili	
Roommates	戏精宿舍	2D	S1	12	2024		
Scissor Seven	刺客伍六七	2D	S1	10	2018	AHA Entertainment	Sharefun Studio
Scissor Seven	刺客伍六七	2D	P1	4	2018	AHA Entertainment	Sharefun Studio
Scissor Seven	刺客伍六七	2D	S2	10	2019	AHA Entertainment	Sharefun Studio
Scissor Seven	刺客伍六七	2D	S3	10	2021	AHA Entertainment	Sharefun Studio
Scissor Seven	刺客伍六七	2D	S4	10	2023	AHA Entertainment	Sharefun Studio
Scissor Seven	刺客伍六七	2D	S5	10	2024	AHA Entertainment	Sharefun Studio
Scissor Seven	刺客伍六七	2D	S6	TBA	TBA	TBA	TBA
Demon Spirit Seed Manual	妖精种植手册	2D	S1	14	2020	Tencent Video	Big Firebird Culture
Antidote	解药	2D	S1	13	2020	Bilibili	Seven Stone Entertainment
The Country of Rare Treasure	秘宝之国	2D	S1	10	2021		210 Animation
So You’re Raising a Warrior	曾经有勇士	2D	S1	TBA	202?	TBA	TBA
The Richest Man In Game	亏成首富从游戏开始	2D	S1	16	2024	Bilibili	Foch Film
Alien Collections	新·异常生物见闻录	2D	S1	7	2025	Bilibili	Pb Animation, LAN Studio, Sunflowers
Qi Refining for 3000 Years	炼气练了3000年	2D	S1	16	2022	Bilibili	Foch Film
Xyrin Empire	希灵纪元	2D	S1	16	2023	Bilibili	Wawayu Animation
Spirits in Chinese Brushes	七侯笔录	2D	S1	12	2023	Bilibili	L²Studio
Agate	无脑魔女	2D	S1	15	2023	Bilibili	UKA
Agate	无脑魔女	2D	S2	15	2024	Bilibili	UKA
The Last Summoner	最后的召唤师	2D	S1	12	2022	Bilibili	ASK Animation Studio
Mythical Creatures Are My Dinners	今天的晚餐就是你	2D	S1	36	2024	Bilibili	
The Martial Weekly	武林不二周刊	2D	S1	24	2023		
Neko Album	猫灵相册	2D	S1	21	2021	Painted Blade Studio	Painted Blade Studio
A Herbivorous Dragon of 5,000 Years Gets Unfairly Villainized	食草老龙被冠以恶龙之名	2D	S1	12	2022	Bilibili	LAN Studio
A Herbivorous Dragon of 5,000 Years Gets Unfairly Villainized	食草老龙被冠以恶龙之名	2D	S2	12	2024	Bilibili	LAN Studio
Demon's Ascension	魔天记	2D	S1	16	2025	iQIYI	Wonder Cat Animation
The Super Cube	超能立方 超凡篇	2D	S1	12	2025	iQIYI, Kuaikan Manhua	Big Firebird Culture
Rising in the Fire	向火而生	2D	S1	6	2025	iQIYI	HM Heros
The Laid Off Demon King	失业魔王	2D	S1	26	2005	Tencent Video	Skyloong
Silent House	哑舍	2D	S1	12	2024	Tencent Video	Colored Pencil Animation
Left-Hand Layup!	左手上篮	2D	S1	8	2023	Tencent Video	Heart & Soul Animation
Left-Hand Layup!	左手上篮	2D	S2	9	2024	Tencent Video	Heart & Soul Animation
World's Best Martial Artist	全球高武	2D	S1	16	2024	Tencent Video	Wawayu Animation
The Unparalleled Black & White	黑白无双	2D	S1	12	2015		Wawayu Animation
The Unparalleled Black & White	黑白无双	2D	S2	12	2017	Bilibili	Wawayu Animation
The Unparalleled Black & White	黑白无双	2D	S3	12	2021	Bilibili	Wawayu Animation

List of Chinese 3D animated series
English title	Chinese title	Style of Animation	Seasons	No. of episodes	Year of Release	Producers	Studios
A Record of Mortal's Journey to Immortality	凡人修仙传	3D	S1	17 + 4	2020	Bilibili	Original Force, Wonder Cat Animation
A Record of Mortal's Journey to Immortality	凡人修仙传	3D	S2	51 + 4	2021	Bilibili	Original Force, Wonder Cat Animation
A Record of Mortal's Journey to Immortality	凡人修仙传	3D	S3	48	2023	Bilibili	Original Force, Wonder Cat Animation
A Record of Mortal's Journey to Immortality	凡人修仙传	3D	S4	52	2025	Bilibili	Original Force, Wonder Cat Animation
The First Order	第一序列	3D	S1		2023		
My Heroic Husband	赘婿	3D	S1		2023		
My Heroic Husband	赘婿	3D	S2		2024		
The God of War Dominates	武神主宰	3D	S1		2020	Tencent Video	Ruo Hong Culture
Master of Star Origin	星源之主	3D	S1	48	2022	Bilibili	Ruo Hong Culture
Core Sense	芯觉	3D	S1	13	2020	Bilibili	CG Year
The Age of Cosmos Exploration	大宇宙时代	3D	S1	12	2024	Bilibili	Foch Film
Lord Xue Ying	雪鹰领主之奇遇篇	3D	S1	26 + 4	2018	Tencent Video	Mili Pictures
Lord Xue Ying	雪鹰领主之奇遇篇	3D	S2	22	2020	Tencent Video	Mili Pictures
Lord Xue Ying	雪鹰领主之奇遇篇	3D	S3	26	2021	Tencent Video	Mili Pictures
Way of Choices	择天记 第五季	2D	S1	13	2015	Tencent Video	Foch Film
Way of Choices	择天记 第五季	2D	S2	12	2016	Tencent Video	Foch Film
Way of Choices	择天记 第五季	2D	S3	12	2017	Tencent Video	Foch Film
Way of Choices	择天记 第五季	2D	S4	12	2018	Tencent Video	Foch Film
Way of Choices	择天记 第五季	2D	S5	12	2020	Tencent Video	Foch Film
You Are A Genius	你真是个天才	3D	S1	24	2022	Bilibili	Mili Pictures
Villain Initialization	反派初始化	3D	S1	16	2024	Bilibili	Studios Chosen
My Journey in an Alternate World	我的异界之旅	3D			2022		
Mountain and Sea Organization	山海际会	3D	S1	25	2023	Bilibili	Xuni Ying Ye
Lord of the Universe	万界神主	3D	S1	60	2019	Tencent Video	Ruo Hong Culture
Lord of the Universe	万界神主	3D	S2	48	2020	Tencent Video	Ruo Hong Culture
Lord of the Universe	万界神主	3D	S3	208	2021	Tencent Video	Ruo Hong Culture
The Demon Hunter	沧元图	3D	S1	26 + 4	2023	Youku	Shenman Culture, Tianshi Wenhua
The Demon Hunter	沧元图	3D	S2	36	2024	Youku	Shenman Culture, Tianshi Wenhua
One Hundred Thousand Years of Qi Refining	炼气十万年	3D	S1	360	2023	Tencent Video	Suoyi Technology
Eclipse of Illusion	云深不知梦	3D	S1	26	2025	Youku	Yien Animation Studio
Tales of Demons and Gods	妖神记 第9季	3D	S1	40	2017	Tencent Video, Bilibili	Ruo Hong Culture
Tales of Demons and Gods	妖神记 第9季	3D	S2	40	2018	Tencent Video, Bilibili	Ruo Hong Culture
Tales of Demons and Gods	妖神记 第9季	3D	S3	40	2018	Tencent Video, Bilibili	Ruo Hong Culture
Tales of Demons and Gods	妖神记 第9季	3D	S4	52	2020	Tencent Video, Bilibili	Ruo Hong Culture
Tales of Demons and Gods	妖神记 第9季	3D	S5	52	2021	Tencent Video, Bilibili	Ruo Hong Culture
Tales of Demons and Gods	妖神记 第9季	3D	S6	52	2022	Tencent Video, Bilibili	Ruo Hong Culture
Tales of Demons and Gods	妖神记 第9季	3D	S7	52	2023	Tencent Video, Bilibili	Ruo Hong Culture
Tales of Demons and Gods	妖神记 第9季	3D	S8	52	2024	Tencent Video, Bilibili	Ruo Hong Culture
Tales of Demons and Gods	妖神记 第9季	3D	S9	52	2025	Tencent Video, Bilibili	Ruo Hong Culture
I am the Blade	我为刀宗	3D	S1	16	2025	iQIYI	G.H.Y. Culture & Media, Long Zhi Gu Wenhua
Tomb of Fallen Gods	神墓	3D	S1	16	2022	Youku	Wonder Cat Animation
Tomb of Fallen Gods	神墓	3D	S2	27	2024	Youku	Wonder Cat Animation
Tomb of Fallen Gods	神墓	3D	S3	52	2025	Youku	Wonder Cat Animation
Perfect World	完美世界	3D	S1	234	2021	Tencent Video	Foch Film
Perfect World	完美世界	3D	Movie 1	1	2024	Tencent Video	Foch Film
Shrouding the Heavens	遮天	3D	S1	156	2023	Tencent Video	Original Force
World of Immortals	长生界	3D	S1	26	2024	Tencent Video	Qingxiang Culture
Renegade Immortal	仙逆	3D	S1	128	2023	Tencent Video	BUILD DREAM
Renegade Immortal	仙逆	3D	Movie 1	1	2025	Tencent Video	BUILD DREAM
Throne of Seal	神印王座	3D	S1	26	2022	Tencent Video	Shenman Culture
Throne of Seal	神印王座	3D	S2	182	2022	Tencent Video	Shenman Culture
Throne of Seal	神印王座	3D	Movie 1	1	2025	Tencent Video	Shenman Culture
Word of Honor	君有云	3D	S1	24	2022	Bilibili	Passion Paint Animation
Word of Honor	君有云	3D	S2	32	2025	Bilibili	Flying Fish Studio
Jade Dynasty	诛仙	3D	S1	26	2022	Tencent Video	Cloud Art
Jade Dynasty	诛仙	3D	S2	26	2024	Tencent Video	Cloud Art
Jade Dynasty	诛仙	3D	S3	26	2025	Tencent Video	Cloud Art
My Senior Brother is Too Strong	我的师兄太强了	3D	S1	48	2025	Bilibili	Suoyi Technology
Embers	余烬行者	3D	S1	15	2025	iQIYI	D.ROCK-ART
Ancient War Soul	太古战魂	3D	S1	40	2025	Youku	Tang Kirin Culture
Over the Divine Realms	神国之上	3D	S1	17	2025	iQIYI	CG Year
Slay The Gods	斩神之凡尘神域	3D	S1	15	2024	Tencent Video	Shenman Culture, Fanqie Animation and Comics
Slay The Gods	斩神之凡尘神域	3D	S2	15	2026	Tencent Video	Shenman Culture, Fanqie Animation and Comics
Honor of Kings	王者荣耀	3D	S1	4	2024	Tencent Video	Cloud Art
Honor of Kings	王者荣耀	3D	S2	4	2025	Tencent Video	Original Force
Wealth and Wonder	克金玩家	3D	S1	26	2025	Youku	Qingxiang Culture
Swallowing the Heavens	吞天记	3D	S1	40	2025	Tencent Video	Suoyi Technology
Little Fairy Yao	小仙之瑶	3D	S1	40	2025	iQIYI	Suoyi Technology
GoWest: Overworked	大侠请上功	3D	S1	10	2025	Bilibili	BYMENT
The Ruins of Kunlun Linglong	荒神录之玲珑山	3D	S1	12	2025	Tencent Video	Niceboat Animation
My Mentor is Wukong	我的师尊是悟空	3D	S1	24	2025		
Legend of Xianwu	仙武传	3D	S1	26	2023	Youku	Xiaoming Taiji
Legend of Xianwu	仙武传	3D	S2	156	2023	Youku	Xiaoming Taiji
Martial Universe	武动乾坤	3D	S1	12	2019	Tencent Video	Motion Magic
Martial Universe	武动乾坤	3D	S2	12	2020	Tencent Video	Motion Magic
Martial Universe	武动乾坤	3D	S3	12	2022	Tencent Video	DC Impression Vision
Martial Universe	武动乾坤	3D	S4	12	2023	Tencent Video	DC Impression Vision
Martial Universe	武动乾坤	3D	S5	12	2025	Tencent Video	DC Impression Vision
Stellar Transformation	星辰变	3D	S1	12	2018	Tencent Video	Foch Film
Stellar Transformation	星辰变	3D	S2	12	2020	Tencent Video	Foch Film
Stellar Transformation	星辰变	3D	S3	12	2021	Tencent Video	Foch Film
Stellar Transformation	星辰变	3D	S4	16	2022	Tencent Video	Foch Film
Stellar Transformation	星辰变	3D	S5	28	2022	Tencent Video	Foch Film
Stellar Transformation	星辰变	3D	S6	28	2025	Tencent Video	Foch Film
The Legend of Princess Chang-Ge	长歌行	3D	S1	16	2025	Bilibili	
The Ravages of Time	火鳳燎原	3D	S1	16	2023	Bilibili	LX Animation Studio
The Ravages of Time	火鳳燎原	3D	S2	16	2025	Bilibili	LX Animation Studio
Everything is Fine with the Emperor	君子无疾	3D	S1	16	2025	Bilibili	Wonder Cat Animation
The Destiny Ruler	天命大主宰	3D	S1	40	2025		Ruo Hong Culture
Zui Qiang Shengji	最强升级	3D	S1	40	2025	Tencent Video	Tang Kirin Culture
Painting Rivers and Lakes: Bad Guys	画江湖之不良人	3D	S1	54	2015	Tencent Video	Rocen
Painting Rivers and Lakes: Bad Guys	画江湖之不良人	3D	S2	40	2016	Tencent Video	Rocen
Painting Rivers and Lakes: Bad Guys	画江湖之不良人	3D	S3	40	2018	Tencent Video	Rocen
Painting Rivers and Lakes: Bad Guys	画江湖之不良人	3D	S4	13	2021	Tencent Video	Rocen
Painting Rivers and Lakes: Bad Guys	画江湖之不良人	3D	S5	12	2022	Tencent Video	Rocen
Painting Rivers and Lakes: Bad Guys	画江湖之不良人	3D	S6	12	2023	Tencent Video	Rocen
Painting Rivers and Lakes: Bad Guys	画江湖之不良人	3D	S7	12	2025	Tencent Video	Rocen
Fighting for the Throne	斗战天下	3D	S1	48	2021		Ruo Hong Culture
Mythical Feasts	风物妖厨	3D	S1	8	2025		
Tiandu Yilu	天都异录	3D	S1	26	2025		
Year Hare Affair	那年那兔那些事儿	2D	S1	12	2015	Bilibili	
Year Hare Affair	那年那兔那些事儿	2D	S2	12	2015	Bilibili	
Year Hare Affair	那年那兔那些事儿	2D	S3	12	2016	Bilibili	
Year Hare Affair	那年那兔那些事儿	2D	S4	12	2017	Bilibili	
Year Hare Affair	那年那兔那些事儿	2D	S5	11	2019	Bilibili	
Year Hare Affair	那年那兔那些事儿	2D	S6	6	2021	Bilibili	
Year Hare Affair	那年那兔那些事儿	2D	S7	12	2025	Bilibili	
Tales of Herding Gods	牧神记	3D	S1		2024	Bilibili	Sparkly Key Animation Studio
Another Journey to the West	缉妖录之启程篇	3D	S1	12	2024	Tencent Video	Bu Kong Yingshi
My Senior Brother Is Too Steady	师兄啊师兄	3D	S1	13	2023	Youku	Sparkly Key Animation Studio
My Senior Brother Is Too Steady	师兄啊师兄	3D	S2	26	2023	Youku	Sparkly Key Animation Studio
My Senior Brother Is Too Steady	师兄啊师兄	3D	S3	52	2024	Youku	Sparkly Key Animation Studio
My Senior Brother Is Too Steady	师兄啊师兄	3D	S4	52	2025	Youku	Sparkly Key Animation Studio
Sword of Coming	剑来	3D	S1	26	2024	Tencent Video	Cloud Art
Sword of Coming	剑来	3D	S2	?	?	Tencent Video	?
Swallowed Star	吞噬星空	3D	S1	26	2020	Tencent Video	Sparkly Key Animation Studio
Swallowed Star	吞噬星空	3D	S2	26	2021	Tencent Video	Sparkly Key Animation Studio
Swallowed Star	吞噬星空	3D	S3	33	2022	Tencent Video	Sparkly Key Animation Studio
Swallowed Star	吞噬星空	3D	S4	123 + 1	2023	Tencent Video	Sparkly Key Animation Studio
Immortality	永生		S1	12	2022	Bilibili	Oriental Creative Color
Immortality	永生		S2	12	2023	Bilibili	Oriental Creative Color
Immortality	永生		S3	16	2024	Bilibili	Oriental Creative Color
Immortality	永生		S4	16	2024	Bilibili	Oriental Creative Color
Martial Peak	武炼巅峰		S1	48	2024	Tencent Video	CG Year
One Way or Another	大道朝天		S1	16	2024	Bilibili	CG Year
Ten Thousand Worlds	万界独尊		S1	50	2021	Tencent Video	Ruo Hong Culture
Ten Thousand Worlds	万界独尊		S2	224	2022	Tencent Video	Ruo Hong Culture
Ten Thousand Worlds	万界独尊		S3	112	2024	Tencent Video	Ruo Hong Culture
Divine Lord of the Heavens	神道帝尊		S1	48	2024	Bilibili	Ruo Hong Culture
Over Goddess	徒弟个个是大佬		S1	40	2025	Youku	Shuiniu Dongman
The War of Cards	卡徒		S1	13	2024	Tencent Video	Oriental Creative Color
Immortal Doctor In Modern City	都市古仙医		S1	150	2024	iQIYI	Xing Yi Kai Chen
Spy x Sect	宗门里除了我都是卧底		S1	?	2024	Bilibili	Suoyi Technology
Tiger Crane	虎鹤妖师录		S1	24	2024	Bilibili	Motion Magic
Wo Neng Wuxian Dunwu	我能无限顿悟		S1	52	2024	iQIYI	Tianshi Wenhua
Martial Inverse	武逆		S1	30	2024	Tencent Video	
Adventures in Subduing the Demons	山海伏魔录		S1	7	2024	Youku	
Ringing Fate	命运拳台		S1	12	(2023)	Bilibili	Kung Fu Frog Animation, MOJO Animation
Monster But Wild S1 and S2 (2023)	区区不才，在下野怪		S1	12	2023	Bilibili	Kung Fu Frog Animation
Monster But Wild S1 and S2 (2023)	区区不才，在下野怪		S2	16	2023	Bilibili	Kung Fu Frog Animation
Legend of Exorcism	天宝伏妖录		S1	13	2020	Bilibili	Sparkly Key Animation Studio
Legend of Exorcism	天宝伏妖录		S2	13	2021	Bilibili	Sparkly Key Animation Studio
Legend of Exorcism	天宝伏妖录		S3	?	?	Bilibili	Sparkly Key Animation Studio

== See also ==
- List of Chinese animated films
