= Alejandro Saab =

American voice actor (born 1994)

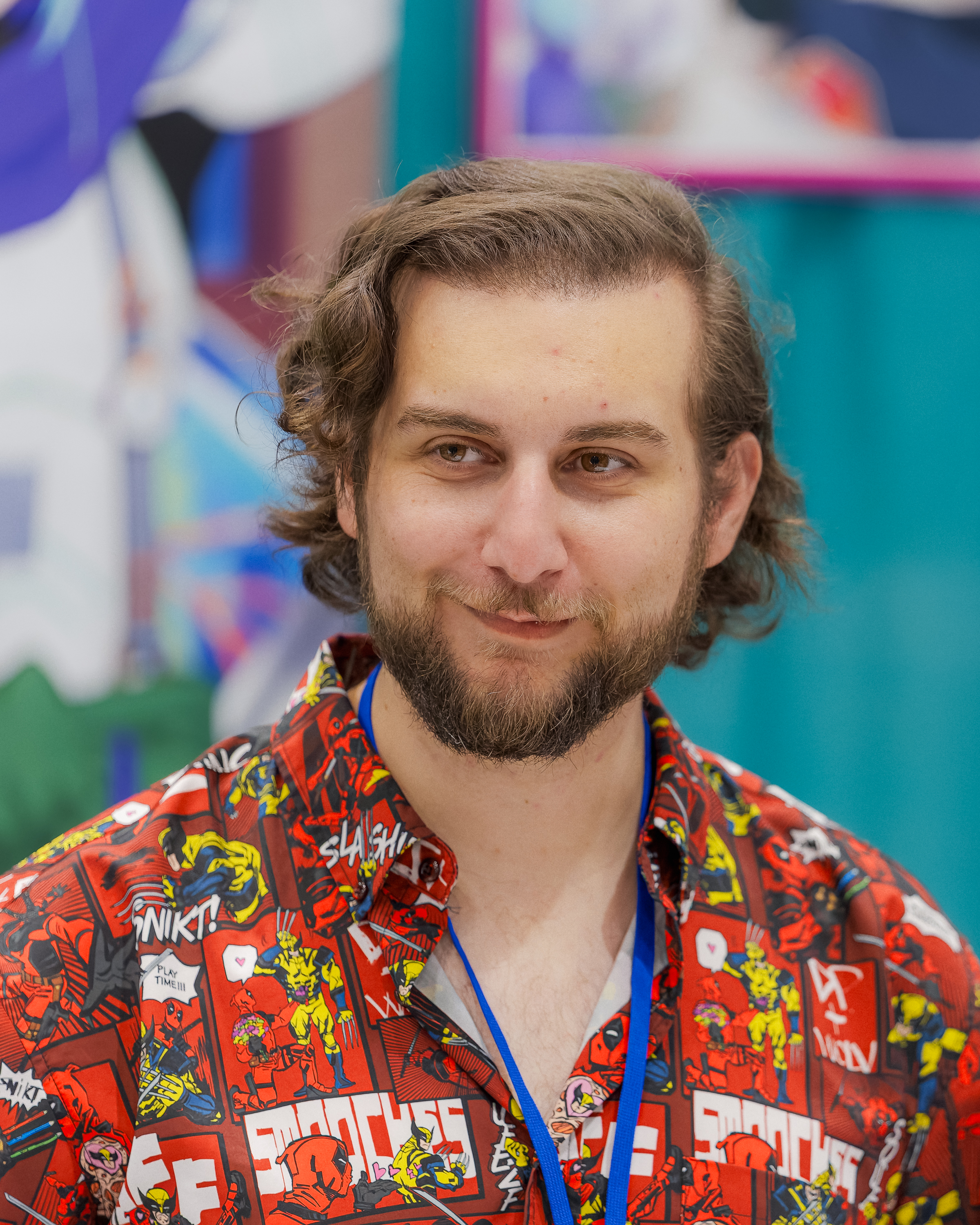
- Saab at the 2026 GalaxyCon Raleigh
- Born: November 15, 1994 (age 32)
- Other names: KaggyFilms; CyYu
- Occupations: Voice acting; Twitch streamer; VTuber
- Years active: 2016–present
- Agent: Atlas Talent
- Spouse: Hayden Daviau (m. 2022)

Twitch information
- Channel: CyYuVtuber
- Years active: 2021–present
- Genres: Gaming; Chatting; Reaction
- Followers: 403 thousand

YouTube information
- Channels: KaggyFilms (Alejandro Saab); CyYuVtuber
- Years active: 2010–2023; 2020–present
- Genres: Reaction; Let's Play
- Subscribers: 805 thousand 580 thousand
- Views: 160 million 303 million
- Last updated: September 13, 2026

Alejandro Saab (born November 15, 1994) is an American voice actor, YouTuber, and VTuber under the name CyYu. He primarily voice acts to English-language dubs of anime and video games. Some of his noteworthy roles include Gabimaru in Hell's Paradise: Jigokuraku, Anton Ivanov in Zenless Zone Zero, Takezo Kurata in Kono Oto Tomare! Sounds of Life, Kazuki Yasaka in Sarazanmai, Izumi Miyamura in Horimiya, Tatsuya Shiba in The Irregular at Magic High School, Cyno in Genshin Impact, Akihiko Sanada in Persona 3 Reload, Jing Yuan in Honkai: Star Rail, Sae Itoshi in Blue Lock and Cheng Xiaoshi in Link Click.

== Biography ==
Saab was born on November 15, 1994. He was raised in Guayaquil, Ecuador and can speak Spanish. He is of Lebanese and Cuban descent. In high school, Saab decided he wanted to pursue a career in voice acting. He later was cast in his first role as Drake in Fairy Tail. An article published by Crunchyroll on 5 February 2025 revealed that Saab voiced 22 anime characters in 2024, of which fourteen were supporting roles.

In July 2021, Saab became engaged to fellow voice actor Hayden Daviau. In 2022, the pair married.

Outside of voice acting, Saab previously ran a YouTube channel under the name of KaggyFilms until 2023, where he posted anime-related content. On July 30, 2021, he began streaming on Twitch as a VTuber named CyYu (short for Cyborg Seiyuu).

== Filmography ==
=== Anime ===
List of voice performances in anime
Year	Title	Role	Notes	Source
2016	Fairy Tail Zero	Grandpa Sniper		
2016	Servamp	Koyuki		
2016	Handa-kun	Akane Tsutsui		
2016	Cheer Boys!!	Soichiro Suzuki		
2016	My Hero Academia	Naomasa Tsukauchi		
2016	Joker Game	Tazaki		
2016	Izetta: The Last Witch	Laurence		
2016	Hanebado!	Hayama		
2016	ReLIFE	Akira Inukai		
2016	Touken Ranbu: Hanamaru	Taikogane Sadamune		
2016	Nanbaka	Uno		
2016	Kiss Him, Not Me	Yusuke Igarashi		
2016	Haikyu!! (season 3)	Kenjirō Shirabu		
2017	Akiba's Trip: The Animation	Tamotsu Denkigai		
2017	Hand Shakers	Break		
2017	Chain Chronicle	Aries		
2017	Akashic Records of Bastard Magic Instructor	Gibul Wisdum		
2017	The Royal Tutor	Leonhard von Glanzreich		
2017	Sakura Quest	Sergio		
2017	Restaurant to Another World	Guard		
2017	Gamers!	Gakuto Kase		
2017	King's Game The Animation	Yosuke Ueda		
2017	My First Girlfriend Is a Gal	Junichi Hashiba		
2017	Star Blazers: Space Battleship Yamato 2199	Akira Nemoto		
2017	Anime-Gataris	Musashisakai Kai		
2017	A Sister's All You Need	Haruto		
2018	Cardcaptor Sakura: Clear Card	Takashi		
2018	Granblue Fantasy The Animation	Imperial Soldier		
2018	Tokyo Ghoul:re	Takeomi Kuroiwa		
2018	Overlord	Vice-Chief		
2018	This Boy is a Professional Wizard	Toyohi Utsumi		
2018	Lord of Vermilion: The Crimson King	Kazama		
2018	Free! Dive to the Future	Shizuru		
2018	Goblin Slayer	Apprentice Boy		
2018	B't X	Bem		
2018	Hitorijime My Hero	Kensuke Ohshiba		
2018	Zombie Land Saga	Romero		
2018	Hero Mask	Robber B		
2018	Megalobox	Pepe Iglesias		
2018	Double Decker! Doug & Kirill	Guillermo		
2018	Hinomaru Sumo	Sada		
2018	UQ Holder!	Chao		
2019	Sword Art Online: Alicization	Johnny Black/Atsushi Kanamoto		
2019	Mix	Ichiban (Natsuno)		
2019	Kono Oto Tomare! Sounds of Life	Takezo Kurata		
2019	Sarazanmai	Kazuki Yasaka		
2019	The Rising of the Shield Hero	L'Arc Berg		
2019	Knights of the Zodiac: Saint Seiya	Scorpio Milo		
2019	Demon Slayer: Kimetsu no Yaiba	Kaigaku		
2019	JoJo's Bizarre Adventure: Golden Wind	Sale		
2020	Beyblade Burst Rise	Blindt DeVoy, Referee (2)		
2020	Food Wars!: Shokugeki no Soma	Terunori Kuga		
2020	Pokémon Journeys: The Series	Leon		
2020	The Pet Girl of Sakurasou	Nekosuke		
2020	Our Last Crusade or the Rise of a New World	Jhin Syulargun		
2020	Gleipnir	Iwao		
2020	The Irregular at Magic High School	Tatsuya Shiba		
2020	Haikyu!! (season 4)	Kenjirō Shirabu		
2021	Kuroko's Basketball	Yukio Kasamatsu	Netflix dub	
2021	Horimiya	Izumi Miyamura		
2021	Pretty Boy Detective Club	Michiru Fukuroi		
2021	Sleepy Princess in the Demon Castle	Twilight the Demon King		
2021	86	Daiya Iruma/Black Dog		
2021	How a Realist Hero Rebuilt the Kingdom	Kazuya Souma		
2021	Hortensia Saga	Deflotte Danois		
2021	Moriarty the Patriot	Blitz Enders		
2021	2.43: Seiin High School Boys Volleyball Team	Subaru Mimura		
2021	Platinum End	Mirai Kakehashi		
2021	Rumble Garanndoll	Munakata		
2022	The Prince of Tennis	Takeshi Momoshiro		
2022	Boruto: Naruto Next Generations	Mugino		
2022	Link Click	Cheng Xiaoshi	Chinese donghua; English dub	
2022	Tokyo 24th Ward	Shuta Aoi	Episodes 7–12, replaces Billy Kametz	
2022	Bastard!! Heavy Metal, Dark Fantasy	Kall-Su		
2022	Beast Tamer	Arios		
2022	Blue Lock	Sae Itoshi		
2023	Mobile Suit Gundam: The Witch from Mercury	Shaddiq		
2023	Vinland Saga	Einar	Netflix dub	
2023	Hell's Paradise: Jigokuraku	Gabimaru		
2023	Digimon Adventure (2020 TV series)	Ponchomon		
2023	Bungo Stray Dogs	Natsume Soseki	Episode 39–40, replaces Greg Chun	
2023	Record of Ragnarok	Zerofuku	Season 2, episode 14-15	
2023	Dr. Stone (season 3)	Matsukaze	Episode 55	
2024	The Wrong Way to Use Healing Magic	Ken Usato / Usato		
2024	Campfire Cooking in Another World with My Absurd Skill	Vincent		
2024	Blue Exorcist: Shimane Illuminati Saga	Michael Gedoin		
2024	Kaiju No. 8	Kaiju No. 9		
2024	Too Many Losing Heroines!	Sosuke		
2024	Fairy Tail: 100 Years Quest	Ignia		
2024	Tower of God	Urek Mazino / Prince	Season 2	
2024	Oshi no Ko	Sumiaki Raida	Season 2	
2024	After-School Hanako-kun	Cashier	Season 2	
2024	Beastars Final Season – Part 1	Mayor, Eado, unnamed parrot	Voicing Mayor after Kametz, Mayor's previous voice actor, died in 2022	
2025	Pokémon Horizons – The Search for Laqua	Jacq		
2025	Yakuza Fiancé: Raise wa Tanin ga Ii	Azami		
2025	Wind Breaker	Natori	Season 2	
2025	Tougen Anki	Ikari Yaoroshi		
2025	Disney Twisted-Wonderland The Animation	Azul Ashengrotto		
2026	Jujutsu Kaisen	Reggie Star	Season 3	
2026	Snowball Earth	Yukio		
2026	Daemons of the Shadow Realm	Ivan Yosano		
2027	Clinic of Horrors	Dr. Charlie Albright		

=== Films ===
List of voice performances in films
Year	Title	Role	Notes	Source
2017	One Piece Film: Gold	Jimmy Myers		
2020	NiNoKuni	Haruto Ichihara		
2021	The Island of Giant Insects	Kazuhiko Kai		
2021	Evangelion: 3.0+1.0 Thrice Upon a Time	Kensuke Aida		
2024	Mobile Suit Gundam SEED Freedom	Orphee Lam Tao		
2025	The Rose of Versailles	Bernard Châtelet	Netflix dub	
2025	Demon Slayer: Kimetsu no Yaiba – The Movie: Infinity Castle	Kaigaku		

=== Video games ===
List of voice performances in video games
Year	Title	Role	Notes	Source
2014	Freedom Planet	Mayor Zao		
2018	Dragon Ball Legends	Shallot		
2019	My Time at Portia	Aadit		
2019	Pokémon Masters EX	Roark, Professor Kukui, Masked Royal		
2019	Borderlands 3	Dental Dan, Sylestro, Promethea Male		
2019	Jumanji: The Video Game	Franklin 'Mouse' Finbar		
2020	Fire Emblem: Three Houses	Yuri Leclerc	Cindered Shadows DLC	
2020	Yandere no Sutoka	Ayato Aishi		
2020	Granblue Fantasy Versus	Seofon (Siete)		
2021	Final Fantasy VII Remake	Jules		
2021	Re:Zero − Starting Life in Another World: The Prophecy of the Throne	Julius Euclius		
2021	Nier Reincarnation	Dimos		
2021	Demon Slayer: Kimetsu no Yaiba – The Hinokami Chronicles	Kaigaku		
2022	Gunvolt Chronicles: Luminous Avenger iX 2	Copen, Ypsilon		
2022	Phantom Breaker: Omnia	Ren Tatewaki		
2022	Lost Ark	Kharmine		
2022	Stranger of Paradise: Final Fantasy Origin	Jed		
2022	Rune Factory 5	Ryker		
2022	Fire Emblem Warriors: Three Hopes	Yuri Leclerc		
2022	Azure Striker Gunvolt 3	Copen		
2022	Genshin Impact	Cyno, Cai Xun		
2022	Freedom Planet 2	Mayor Zao		
2022	Cyberpunk 2077: Phantom Liberty	Aguilar Nubiola		
2022	God of War: Ragnarok	Bodvar the Fierce		
2022	River City Girls 2	Primo, Enoki		
2023	Octopath Traveler II	Osvald V. Vanstein		
2023	Honkai: Star Rail	Jing Yuan		
2023	The Legend of Heroes: Trails into Reverie	Liang, Division Soldiers		
2023	Eternights	Chani		
2023	The Legend of Nayuta: Boundless Trails	Signa Alzahen, Selam		
2023	Cookie Run: Kingdom	Smoked Cheese Cookie		
2023	Rhapsody II: Ballad of the Little Princess	Randy Lafine, Hammer		
2023	Rhapsody III: Memories of Marl Kingdom	Hammer, Randy Lafine		
2023	Disgaea 7: Vows of the Virtueless	Fuji		
2023	Like a Dragon Gaiden: The Man Who Erased His Name	Additional voices		
2023	Granblue Fantasy Versus: Rising	Seofon (Siete)		
2024	Granblue Fantasy: Relink	Seofon, Reaper Avalan		
2024	Persona 3 Reload	Akihiko Sanada		
2024	Contra: Operation Galuga	Lance Bean		
2024	Zenless Zone Zero	Anton Ivanov		
2024	Unicorn Overlord	Ithilion		
2024	The Legend of Heroes: Trails Through Daybreak	Sherid Asval, citizens		
2024	Card-en-Ciel	Imperial ♂, Copen, Ypsilon		
2024	Ys X: Nordics	Grenn Berge		
2025	Dynasty Warriors: Origins	Sun Quan		
2025	Poppy Playtime	Father, Cole Vaughn/Guard #1		
2025	The Legend of Heroes: Trails Through Daybreak II	Sherid Asval, citizens		
2025	Guilty Gear Strive	Robo-Ky	English Dub; DLC Assist character for Venom	
2025	Rune Factory: Guardians of Azuma	Kai, additional voices		
2025	Yakuza 0 Director's Cut	Jun Oda		
2025	Date Everything!	Dunk		
2025	Raidou Remastered: The Mystery of the Soulless Army	Additional voices		
2025	Borderlands 4	Rafa The Exo-Soldier		
2025	Towa and the Guardians of the Sacred Tree	Akazu, Tanya, Kaji		
2025	Pac-Man World 2 Re-Pac	Blinky		
2025	Digimon Story: Time Stranger	Greymon, MetalGreymon, WarGreymon, additional voices		
2025	Arcadia Fallen	Michael		
2026	Marvel Rivals	Wade Wilson / Deadpool		
2026	Fatal Fury: City of the Wolves	Rick Strowd		
2026	Ace Combat 8: Wings of Theve	Additional voices	Main Campaign	
2026	Final Fantasy Resonance	Lasswell		
2026	Echoes of Aincrad	Musoh		

=== Animation ===
List of voice performances in animation
Year	Title	Role	Notes	Source
2019	YooHoo to the Rescue	Khan, Martee		
2021	Miraculous: Tales of Ladybug & Cat Noir	Chris Lahiffe, Marc Anciel, Jalil Kubdel	Replaces Kyle McCarley as Marc season 4, Vic Mignogna as Jalil season 5 onwards	
2022	Link Click	Cheng Xiaoshi	Chinese donghua; English dub	
2023–2024	Lego Monkie Kid	Macaque	Replacing Billy Kametz; "Court of the Yellow Robed Demon" to "Harbringer"	
2024	What If...?	Quentin Beck / Mysterio	Episode: "What If... the Emergence Destroyed the Earth?"	
2025	To Be Hero X	Wreck		

=== Web series ===
List of acting performances in web series
Year	Title	Role	Notes	Source
2015–2024	Sword Art Online Abridged	Schmitt, Corvatz	4 episodes	
2016	MyStreet	Gene		
2022	Nat 19: Vestige of Ophiuchus	Wrench	30 episodes	
2026	Mystery Skulls Animated - When I'm With You	Lewis		

=== Audio dramas ===
List of acting performances in audio dramas
Year	Title	Role	Notes	Source
2026	Sonic the Hedgehog Presents: The Chaotix Casefiles	Gemerl, Infinite	Replaces Liam O'Brien as Infinite	
