= Bicycle Boy (film) =

- Directed by: Liu Kexin
- Based on: Bicycle Boy
- Release date: January 1, 2015 (China)
- Running time: 90 minutes
- Country: China
- Language: Mandarin
- Box office: CN¥10.5 million (China)

Bicycle Boy (Chinese: 龙骑侠) is a 2015 Chinese animated fantasy adventure film directed by Liu Kexin and based on an animated television series of the same name. It was released on January 1. A second film, Bicycle Boy 2, released in China in 2017.

== Plot ==
The movie "Dragon Rider" (formerly known as the Adventure of Bashiku) is based on the animated film "The Legend of Guoguo Rider", telling a fantasy inspirational story about a flower delivery boy who accidentally becomes a hero. The movie "Dragon Rider" not only further shapes the protagonist's strong and brave positive image, but also continues the theme of inspirational adventure, and enhances the fun and watchability of the film.

Many years ago, the evil Black Governor and his dark army invaded the five continents of the elves, and wherever they went, they were charred, but they were defeated by the brave Dragon Rider at the last moment. But the Black Governor was not eliminated that year, and now there is only a stiff statue left of the Dragon Rider...

Guoguo is a flower delivery boy on the Green Island. He has a heroic dream in his heart, but lives an ordinary life. At the same time, the Black Governor has made a comeback again. Everyone urgently needs to find the Dragon Rider, but what they never expected is that Guoguo is the one who got the Dragon Wing, the symbol of the Dragon Rider. Soon, the evil forces invaded in large numbers. Can the little hero Guoguo transform into a Dragon Rider, and how will he resolve the crisis...

== Voice cast ==
- Tang Xiaoxi
- Zhang Xueling
- Lu Zhixing

== Reception ==
The film earned CN¥10.5 million at the Chinese box office.
