= Link Click =

Chinese donghua series

- 时光代理人
- Genre: Drama; Fantasy; Science fiction
- Written by: Li Haoling
- Directed by: Li Haoling
- Country of origin: China
- Original language: Mandarin
- No. of seasons: 3
- No. of episodes: 35 + 7 specials (list of episodes)

Production
- Cinematography: Yuka Yamajou
- Animator: Studio LAN
- Production company: Studio LAN

Original release
- Network: Bilibili
- Release: April 30, 2021 – present

Link Click (Chinese: 时光代理人; pinyin: Shíguāng Dàilǐrén, lit. 'Time Agents') is a Chinese donghua web series written and directed by Li Haoling and produced by Studio LAN with assistance by Li's studio, Haoliners Animation League.

The first season aired from April 30, 2021, to July 9, 2021, on Bilibili and Funimation. There were a total of 12 episodes, including a special episode named 5.5. A second season aired from July 14, 2023, to September 22, 2023, on Bilibili. Several chibi specials were also released.

A prequel season titled Bridon Arc aired from December 27, 2024, to January 31, 2025. A third season premiered on August 14, 2026.

== Synopsis ==
Cheng Xiaoshi and Lu Guang run Moment of Time Photo Studio and accept requests from clients to relieve them of regrets. Through a photo provided by the client, Cheng Xiaoshi can travel back in time to the moment it was taken and assumes the identity of its photographer, with him absorbing the photographer's memories and emotions in the process. At the same time, Lu Guang has the ability to keep track of the events in time and helps Cheng Xiaoshi relive the experiences of the photographer. The two work under the assumptions that they have only 12 hours with one chance to travel in time and find what their client is searching for, while also leaving the events of the past unchanged.

== Characters ==
=== Main ===
Cheng Xiaoshi (程小时; Chéng Xiǎoshí)
Voiced by: Su Shangqing (Mandarin), Alejandro Saab, Xanthe Huynh (young) (English), Toshiyuki Toyonaga (Japanese)
The owner of Time Photo Studio. He possesses the ability to time travel through entering photos and possessing the photographer (he appears as himself if the photo is via. surveillance), and any action he takes can affect the timeline.
Lu Guang (陆光; Lù Guāng)
Voiced by: Yang Tianxiang (Mandarin), Zeno Robinson (English), Takahiro Sakurai (Japanese)
Cheng Xiaoshi's friend and partner at Time Photo Studio. He has the ability to look at a photo and retrace its area within 12 hours after it has been taken. While Xiaoshi is traveling through time, Lu Guang is able to telepathically communicate with him.
Qiao Ling (乔苓; Qiáo Líng)
Voiced by: Li Shimeng (Mandarin), Suzie Yeung (English), Aoi Koga (Japanese)
Xiaoshi's childhood friend and landlady of Time Photo Studio. She often arrives at the studio to provide time clients for Xiaoshi and Guang.

=== Recurring ===
Xiao Li (肖力; Xiāo Lì)
Voiced by: Tute Hameng (Mandarin), Christopher Sabat (English)
A police captain who requests the Time Studio's help in solving the murder case involving Liu Min.
Qian Jin (钱进; Qián Jìn)
Voiced by: Wei Chao (Mandarin), Aaron Campbell (English)
Liu Jing's lawyer who is Xiao Li's former police partner.
Liu Jing (刘晶; Liú Jīng)
Voiced by: Lin Qiang (Mandarin), Anthony Bowling (English)
CEO of Quede Games and Liu Min's father who requests Qian Jin's services.
Liu Min (刘旻; Liú Mín)
Voiced by: Sun Lulu (Mandarin), Daman Mills (English)
A gold-haired serial killing digital influencer who is the son of Quede Games CEO Liu Jing.
Emma/Wu Lihua (吴丽华; Wú Lìhuá)
Voiced by: Zhao Yitong (Mandarin), Xanthe Huynh (English)
Overworked secretary to the CFO at Quede Games (formerly) and client of Time Photo Studio.
Chen Bin (陈彬; Chén Bīn)
Voiced by: Xing Chao (Mandarin), Howard Wang (English)
Xiao Li's police partner.
Xu Shanshan (徐姗姗; Xú Shānshān)
A school friend of Qiao Ling, Cheng Xiaoshi, and Lu Guang who comes to them seeking help when she can't remember what Dong Yi told her when she was drunk.
Dong Yi (董易; Dǒng Yì)
Xu Shanshan's friend who enjoys hanging out with her and uses every excuse he can to stay by her side.
Yu Xia (予夏; Yú Xià)
Client of Time Photo Studio who asks them to find the secret ingredient to her friend Lin Zhen's noodles after she left her to restart everything.
Lin Zhen (林贞; Lín Zhēn)
Yu Xia's closest friend and chef of their noodles. She ended up leaving Yu Xia's side after coming to terms with the fact she no longer enjoyed making the noodles Yu Xia once enjoyed.
Chen Xiao (陈潇; Chén Xiāo)
Voiced by: Waiwai (Mandarin)
A client who seeks out the Time Studio as he asks if they could simply deliver a message to some people from his past on the day of a basketball game. Qiao Ling notes that he looks incredibly tired and unhappy.
Liu Lei (刘磊; Liú Lěi)
Lu Hongbin (陆鸿斌; Lù Hóngbīn)
Doudou (豆豆; Dòu Dòu)
A young boy who is kidnapped. The Time Photo Studio looks for clues to secure the boy's rescue.

== Media ==
=== Donghua ===
The first season of the donghua series was released on Bilibili and Funimation on April 30, 2021. It was directed by Li Haoling, original character design by INPLICK, art directed by Tanji Takumi, Asami Tomoya, and Zhu Lipiao, photography directed by Sanjou Yasuka, and chief animation directed by Studio LAN. A second season was announced at the ending of the episode 11. Crunchyroll premiered an English dub on August 8, 2022.

==== Music ====
===== Season 1 =====
Link Click Animation Soundtrack

Soundtrack album by Jaws, Fanka, Yousa, Zou Junjian, Tenmon, Yuma Yamaguchi, av4ln
- Released: August 20, 2021
- Length: 99:12
- Languages: Mandarin, English
- Label: Bilibili
- Producers: Fanka and Yan Bingyin

Link Click soundtrack albums chronology
Link Click Animation Soundtrack (2021)	Link Click Season 2 Animation Soundtrack (2023)

The opening theme for season 1 is "Dive Back in Time" by Jaws, while the ending theme is "OverThink" by Fanka. Alternative versions of "Dive Back in Time", performed by bicaso (a vocal project by Sony Music Entertainment Japan) featuring Gen Kakon, and "OverThink", performed by bicaso featuring Eaeran, were also released and used in the Japanese dub version.

The soundtrack album – composed by various artists – was released on August 20, 2021, by Bilibili.

Link Click Animation Soundtrack
No.	Title	Lyrics	Music	Artist	Length
1.	"Dive Back in Time"	Michael Yu	Michael Yu	Jaws	2:54
2.	"Dive Back in Time (伴奏)" (instrumental)		Michael Yu		2:54
3.	"Overthink"	Fanka	Fanka	Fanka	3:00
4.	"Overthink" (instrumental)		Fanka	Fanka	3:00
5.	"It's Beautiful With You (与你有关)"	Yousa	Zheng Wei	Yousa	3:41
6.	"It's Beautiful With You (与你有关)" (instrumental)		Zheng Wei		3:37
7.	"Link Click (时光教会我的)" (piano version)	Wang Xiaoqian	Yang Bingyin	Zou Junjian	3:53
8.	"Link Click (时光教会我的)"	Wang Xiaoqian	Yang	Zōu Jùnjiàn (邹俊健)	3:41
9.	"Beginning"		Tenmon	Tenmon	2:54
10.	"Overcome"		Tenmon	Tenmon	3:18
11.	"Hope"		Tenmon	Tenmon	3:16
12.	"Sign"		Yamaguchi	Yamaguchi	2:56
13.	"Joke"		Tenmon	Tenmon	1:52
14.	"Alright"		av4ln	av4ln	1:54
15.	"Street"		Tenmon	Tenmon	2:14
16.	"Ordinary"		Yamaguchi	Yamaguchi	2:08
17.	"Countdown"		Yamaguchi	Yamaguchi	2:34
18.	"Mission"		Tenmon	Tenmon	1:58
19.	"Afternoon"		Tenmon	Tenmon	2:00
20.	"Relaxation"		Tenmon	Tenmon	1:55
21.	"Memories"		Tenmon	Tenmon	2:21
22.	"Arabesque"		Yamaguchi, av4ln	Yamaguchi, av4ln	2:09
23.	"Pray"		Tenmon	Tenmon	2:58
24.	"Wind"		Tenmon	Tenmon	2:03
25.	"Peaceful"		Tenmon	Tenmon	2:07
26.	"Hazy"		av4ln	av4ln	2:08
27.	"Luminous"		av4ln, Yamaguchi	av4ln, Yamaguchi	2:00
28.	"Strain"		Tenmon	Tenmon	2:08
29.	"Turbulence"		av4ln	av4ln	1:57
30.	"Tense"		Yamaguchi	Yamaguchi	2:10
31.	"Ominous"		Tenmon	Tenmon	2:48
32.	"Struggle"		Tenmon	Tenmon	2:35
33.	"Sprint"		Tenmon	Tenmon	2:16
34.	"Power"		Tenmon	Tenmon	2:01
35.	"Decision"		Tenmon	Tenmon	2:27
36.	"Hero"		Tenmon	Tenmon	2:24
37.	"Invigorate"		Tenmon	Tenmon	1:56
38.	"Irritation"		Tenmon	Tenmon	0:58
39.	"Silence"		Tenmon	Tenmon	0:56
40.	"Nostalgic"		Tenmon	Tenmon	0:49
41.	"News"		Tenmon	Tenmon	1:05
42.	"Chase"		Tenmon	Tenmon	0:38
43.	"Calm"		Yamaguchi	Yamaguchi	0:39
Total length:					99:12

===== Season 2 =====
Link Click Season 2 Animation Soundtrack

Soundtrack album by Tenmon, Yuma Yamaguchi, Kent Watari, Ignacio Ramirez
- Released: September 30, 2023
- Length: 56:57
- Languages: Mandarin and English
- Label: Bilibili

Link Click soundtrack albums chronology
Link Click Animation Soundtrack (2021)	Link Click Season 2 Animation Soundtrack (2023)

Singles from Link Click Season 2 Animation Soundtrack
- 1. "The Tides" Released: July 5, 2023; 2. "Vortex" Released: July 8, 2023; 3. "Flash" Released: July 16, 2023; 4. "出借" Released: July 23, 2023; 5. "XƎTЯOVerthink" Released: July 24, 2023; 6. "Until It Dies" Released: July 30, 2023; 7. "Mastermind" Released: October 1, 2023

The opening theme is "Vortex" by 白鲨JAWS, while the ending theme is "The Tides" by Fanka and Jaws. The song "Vortex" contains reversed lyrics; this was because of writer/director Li Haoling's request to incorporate the theme of reversing time into the song.

The music for season 2 was composed by various artists. The soundtrack album was first released on September 30, 2023. A later re-release, released on January 15, 2024, contained additional opening, ending, insert, and promotional songs.

Link Click Season 2 Animation Soundtrack standard edition
No.	Title	Music	Artist	Length
1.	"Gloom"	Tenmon	Tenmon	3:51
2.	"Facing"	Yamaguchi	Yamaguchi	3:27
3.	"Infantile"	Tenmon	Tenmon	4:52
4.	"Vacant"	Kent Watari	Watari	3:19
5.	"Serenade"	Yamaguchi	Yamaguchi	3:35
6.	"Feeling"	Tenmon	Tenmon	4:24
7.	"Blaze"	Watari	Watari	4:17
8.	"Escape"	Tenmon	Tenmon	3:08
9.	"Earth"	Yamaguchi	Yamaguchi	2:36
10.	"Rete"	Watari	Watari	2:33
11.	"Infer"	Yamaguchi	Yamaguchi	2:21
12.	"Detector"	Watari	Watari	1:58
13.	"Separation"	Tenmon	Tenmon	2:49
14.	"Relationship"	Watari	Watari	2:45
15.	"Reminisce"	Yamaguchi	Yamaguchi	2:51
16.	"Distance"	Tenmon	Tenmon	2:16
17.	"Dream"	Yamaguchi	Yamaguchi	2:16
18.	"Romeo and Juliet Overture"	Pyotr Ilyich Tchaikovsky	Ignacio Ramirez	3:39
Total length:				56:57

Link Click Season 2 Animation Soundtrack re-release edition
No.	Title	Lyrics	Music	Artist	Length
1.	"The Tides"	Fanka and Michael Yu	Fanka and Michael Yu	Jaws	3:20
2.	"Vortex"	Michael Yu	Mìchael Yu	Jaws	4:09
3.	"Flash"	Higashi Lowland	Sasanomaly, Higashi Lowland	Gorilla Attack	3:28
4.	"出借"	Shuo	Shuo	Tan Yun	3:18
5.	"Until It Dies"	Tan Yun	Tan Yun	Tan Yun	5:01
6.	"Gloom"		Tenmon	Tenmon	3:51
7.	"Facing"		Yamaguchi	Yamaguchi	3:27
8.	"Infantile"		Tenmon	Tenmon	4:52
9.	"Vacant"		Kent Watari	Watari	3:19
10.	"Serenade"		Yamaguchi	Yamaguchi	3:35
11.	"Feeling"		Tenmon	Tenmon	4:24
12.	"Blaze"		Watari	Watari	4:17
13.	"Escape"		Tenmon	Tenmon	3:08
14.	"Earth"		Yamaguchi	Yamaguchi	2:36
15.	"Rete"		Watari	Watari	2:33
16.	"Infer"		Yamaguchi	Yamaguchi	2:21
17.	"Detector"		Watari	Watari	1:58
18.	"Separation"		Tenmon	Tenmon	2:49
19.	"Relationship"		Watari	Watari	2:45
20.	"Reminisce"		Yamaguchi	Yamaguchi	2:51
21.	"Distance"		Tenmon	Tenmon	2:16
22.	"Dream"		Yamaguchi	Yamaguchi	2:16
23.	"Romeo and Juliet Overture"		Pyotr Ilyich Tchaikovsky	Ignacio Ramirez	3:39
24.	"Overthink"	Fanka and Michael Yu	Fanka and Michael Yu	Jaws and Fanka	3:22
25.	"Mastermind"	Kat	Kat	Kat	3:20
26.	"3,2,1!"	Michael Yu	Michael Yu	Cheng Xiaoshi, Lu Guang, and Qiao Ling	4:02
27.	"盗火者"	Fanka	Fanka	Chen Litian and Liu Xiao	3:52
Total length:					90:59

=== Audio drama ===
An audio drama adaptation was released on Mao Er FM on November 10, 2022, and aired every Thursday. The first season consists of 12 episodes that are each about 30 minutes long.

=== Live-action drama ===
A live-action drama adaptation was announced on June 17, 2023. The series can be found on Bilibili or YouTube, starring Jiang Long as Cheng Xiaoshi and Bi Wenjun as Lu Guang.

A Japanese live action adaptation has been announced and is a co-production between Fuji TV, Bilibili, and Tokai TV. The series aired on THK, Fuji TV and its affiliates from April 11 to June 13, 2026.

=== Musical ===
A stage musical adaptation was announced on August 8, 2023, and premiered on November 10, 2023.

== Reception ==
Reviewing the first season for /Film, Rafael Motamayor praised the animation, music, and the series's ability to create tension. He described Link Click as "life-affirming" and "feel[ing] fresh and new".

=== Accolades ===
Year	Award	Category	Nominee(s)	Result	Ref.
2026	New York International Film Awards	Best Animation, February 2026	Link Click: Bridon Arc	Won	
2026	Lisbon Animated Film Festival	Audience Award (Perspectives Features Competition)	Link Click: Bridon Arc	Won	
2026	Sweden Film Awards	Winner, February 2026	Link Click: Bridon Arc	Won	

== See also ==
- Chinese animation
- List of Chinese animation
- Time travel in fiction
