= List of Link Click episodes =

Link Click is a Chinese donghua series. The first season aired from April 30, 2021, to July 9, 2021, on Bilibili and Funimation. There were a total of 12 episodes, including a special episode named 5.5. A second season aired from July 14, 2023, to September 22, 2023, on Bilibili. Several chibi specials were also released. Crunchyroll premiered an English dub on August 8, 2022.

== Series overview ==
Season	Episodes	Originally released	
Season	Episodes	First released	Last released
1	11	April 30, 2021	July 9, 2021
2	12	July 14, 2023	September 22, 2023
3	12	August 14, 2026	October 23, 2026

== Episodes ==
=== Season 1 (2021) ===
No. overall	No. in season	Title	Original release date
1	1	"Emma" (EMMA)	April 30, 2021
2	2	"Secret Recipe"; Transliteration: "Mì Fāng" (Chinese: 秘方)	April 30, 2021
3	3	"To Lose, Not To Win"; Transliteration: "Zhīxǔ Shū，Bùzhǔn Yíng" (Chinese: 只许输，不准赢)	May 7, 2021
4	4	"Confess"; Transliteration: "Gàobái" (Chinese: 告白)	May 14, 2021
5	5	"Farewell"; Transliteration: "Gàobié" (Chinese: 告别)	May 21, 2021
5.5	5.5	"Marrying by Contesting"; Transliteration: "Bǐ Wǔ Zhāo Qīn" (Chinese: 比武招亲)	May 28, 2021
6	6	"Search of The Child"; Transliteration: "Xún Zǐ" (Chinese: 寻子)	June 4, 2021
7	7	"Aunt May"; Transliteration: "Méi Yí" (Chinese: 梅姨)	June 11, 2021
8	8	"Lost Signal"; Transliteration: "Cuòshī de Xùnhào" (Chinese: 错失的讯号)	June 19, 2021
9	9	"Consequence of Goodwill"; Transliteration: "Shànyì de Èguǒ" (Chinese: 善意的恶果)	June 25, 2021
10	10	"Trap"; Transliteration: "Quāntào" (Chinese: 圈套)	July 2, 2021
11	11	"Pinnacle of Light"; Transliteration: "Dài zhuó Guāng de Rén" (Chinese: 带着光的人)	July 9, 2021

=== Season 2 (2023) ===
No. overall	No. in season	Title	Original release date
12	1	"Falling"; Transliteration: "Zhuìluò" (Chinese: 坠落)	July 14, 2023
13	2	"Night Raid"; Transliteration: "Yè Xí" (Chinese: 夜袭)	July 14, 2023
14	3	"Two Funerals"; Transliteration: "Liǎngcháng Zànglǐ" (Chinese: 两场葬礼)	July 21, 2023
15	4	"Them in the Photo"; Transliteration: "Zhàopiàn Zhōng de Tāmén" (Chinese: 照片中的她们)	July 28, 2023
16	5	"Last Supper"; Transliteration: "Zuìhòu de Wǎncān" (Chinese: 最后的晚餐)	August 4, 2023
17	6	"Lee Tian Xi"; Transliteration: "Lǐ Tiān Xī" (Chinese: 李天希)	August 11, 2023
18	7	"Urban Warfare"; Transliteration: "Xiàng Zhàn" (Chinese: 巷战)	August 18, 2023
19	8	"Hostage"; Transliteration: "Rénzhì" (Chinese: 人质)	August 25, 2023
20	9	"Three Stories"; Transliteration: "Sān gè gùshì" (Chinese: 三个故事) Part 1: "Inevitable Tragedy"; Transliteration: "Bìrán de bēijù" (Chinese: 必然的悲剧) Part 2: "Fortuitous Comedy"; Transliteration: "Ǒurán de xǐjù" (Chinese: 偶然的喜剧) Part 3: "Siblings' Fairy Tale"; Transliteration: "Xiōngmèi de tónghuà" (Chinese: 兄妹的童话)	September 1, 2023
21	10	"Improvise"; Transliteration: "Jíxīng Yǎnchū" (Chinese: 即兴演出)	September 8, 2023
22	11	"Confrontation"; Transliteration: "Duìzhì" (Chinese: 对峙)	September 15, 2023
23	12	"Can't Live Without A Good Brother"; Transliteration: "Bùnéng Méiyǒu Hǎo Gēgē" (Chinese: 不能没有好哥哥)	September 22, 2023

=== Season 3 (2026) ===
No. overall	No. in season	Title	Original release date
24	1	"The Forgotten Past"; Transliteration: "Yíwàng De Guòqù" (Chinese: 遗忘的过去)	August 14, 2026
25	2	"The Caged Beast"; Transliteration: "Kùn Shòu" (Chinese: 困兽)	August 14, 2026
26	3	"Bloodbath in Laos"; Transliteration: "Xuèxǐ Miǎn Wō" (Chinese: 血洗缅挝)	August 21, 2026
27	4	"Jae" (Chinese: JAE)	August 28, 2026
28	5	"Welcome Banquet"; Transliteration: "Jiēfēng yàn" (Chinese: 接风宴)	September 4, 2026
29	6	"Testing the Waters"; Transliteration: "Shìtàn" (Chinese: 试探)	September 11, 2026
30	7	"Chinatown Detective"; Transliteration: "Tángrénjiē tàn àn" (Chinese: 唐人街探案)	September 18, 2026
31	8	"Bloody Storm"; Transliteration: "Xuèsè Fēnglàng" (Chinese: 血色风浪)	September 25, 2026
32	9	"Confession"; Transliteration: "Tǎnshuài" (Chinese: 坦白)	October 2, 2026
33	10	"Misplaced Redemption"; Transliteration: "Cuòwèi De Jiùshú" (Chinese: 错位的救赎)	October 9, 2026
34	11	"The Vanishing Exit"; Transliteration: "Xiāoshī De Chūkǒu" (Chinese: 消失的出口)	October 16, 2026
35	12	"Welcome Home"; Transliteration: "Huānyíng Huí Jiā" (Chinese: 欢迎回家)	October 23, 2026

== Specials ==
=== Link Click: Bridon Arc (2024–2025) ===
No.	Title	Original release date
1	"So Time Begins to Flow Again"; Transliteration: "Yúshì Shíjiān Zàicì Kāishǐ Liúzhuǎn" (Chinese: 于是时间再次开始流转)	December 27, 2024
2	"Prelude"; Transliteration: "Xùmù" (Chinese: 序幕)	January 3, 2025
3	"Them"; Transliteration: "Tāmen" (Chinese: 他们)	January 10, 2025
4	"And Then There Were None"; Transliteration: "Wú Rén Shēnghuán" (Chinese: 无人生还)	January 17, 2025
5	"Reunion"; Transliteration: "Chóngféng" (Chinese: 重逢)	January 24, 2025
6	"Puzzle"; Transliteration: "Míjú" (Chinese: 迷局)	January 31, 2025

== Chibi ==
=== Special (2021) ===
Title	Original release date
"Troubles of Ordinary People" Transliteration: "Xiāoyáo Sànrén de Wěituō" (Chinese: 逍遥散人的委托)	August 27, 2021

=== The Daily Life in Lightime (2021–22) ===
No.	Title	Original release date
1	"The Daily Life in Lightime Short Episode 1"	October 10, 2021
2	"The Daily Life in Lightime Short Episode 2"	November 10, 2021
3	"The Daily Life in Lightime Short Episode 3"	December 10, 2021
4	"The Daily Life in Lightime Short Episode 4"	January 10, 2022
5	"The Daily Life in Lightime Short Episode 5"	February 10, 2022
6	"The Daily Life in Lightime Short Episode 6"	March 10, 2022
7	"The Daily Life in Lightime Short Episode 7"	April 10, 2022
8	"The Daily Life in Lightime Short Episode 8"	May 10, 2022
9	"The Daily Life in Lightime Short Episode 9"	June 10, 2022
10	"The Daily Life in Lightime Short Episode 10"	July 10, 2022
11	"The Daily Life in Lightime Short Episode 11"	August 10, 2022
12	"The Daily Life in Lightime Short Episode 12"	September 10, 2022
13	"The Daily Life in Lightime Short Episode 13"	October 10, 2022
14	"The Daily Life in Lightime Short Episode 14"	November 10, 2022
