= Astro Plan =

- 太空历险记
- Country of origin: China
- Original language: Mandarin
- No. of seasons: 1
- No. of episodes: 26

Production
- Producer: Xing Yuan

Original release
- Network: Golden Eagle Channel
- Release: January 16, 2010 – February 2010

Astro Plan, known in China as Space Adventures (Chinese: 太空历险记; pinyin: Tàikōng Lìxiǎnjì) and informally in Japan as Star Field War Record Astro Plan (星原戦記アストロプラン, Hoshihara Senki Asutoropuran), is a science fiction mecha animated series created by Guangzhou-based toy firm Xing Yuan. Hailed as "China's first sci-fi animation", the series premiered on Chinese television on January 16, 2010, through Hunan TV's Golden Eagle Channel and ended in mid-February with a total of 26 episodes.

== Plot ==
In the year 2735, mankind has begun to venture into space to find a new home after Earth's environment succumbs to global warming and the bombardment of asteroids into the atmosphere. During their voyage, the Space Migration Fleet encounters an alien race from the planet Iccus. As raiders of natural resources, the aliens are bent on galactic domination. To combat the threat, six young fighters are recruited into the Sky Arrow Flight Team and are equipped with transformable Type Yi fighter planes.

== Characters ==
- Tian Long - A brash young pilot and leader of the Sky Arrow Flight Team.
- Hai Ying - An expert sniper.
- Jin Gang - The oldest member of the Sky Arrow Flight Team.
- Zi Jing - A female pilot that resembles Tieria Erde from Mobile Suit Gundam 00.
- Fei Yi - A character that resembles Lockon Stratos from Mobile Suit Gundam 00.
- Zhou Zhi - The youngest member of the squadron.

== Mecha ==
The Sky Arrow Flight Team is equipped with three YF-10 and three YF-11 Type Yi transformable fighters. Each fighter is capable of transforming into robot mode, as well as the hybrid "Falcon" mode (similar to the GERWALK mode of the VF-1 Valkyrie from Macross). All fighters are equipped with Gun Pods and an array of missiles, but each unit has a weapon and livery unique to its pilot and their "Ultimate Skill" (similar to the Trans-Am System used in Mobile Suit Gundam 00):

- YF-10 Unit 1 - Piloted by Tian Long with a white color scheme similar to the VF-25F Messiah of Alto Saotome in Macross Frontier. The fighter unit's main weapon is a beam sword used in Tian Long's Ultimate Skill, which consists of a forward slash that releases an energy wave toward the target.
- YF-10 Unit 2 - Piloted by Hai Ying with a blue color scheme similar to the VF-25G Messiah of Michel Blanc in Macross Frontier. Its main weapon is a sniper bazooka rifle.
- YF-10 Unit 3 - Piloted by Jin Gang with a gray color scheme similar to the VF-25S Messiah of Ozma Lee in Macross Frontier. The unit's main arsenal consists of an energy axe and a shield. For Jin Gang's Ultimate Skill, several metal plates eject from his shield and form two circular energy blades, which spin around him as he charges toward his targets.
- YF-11 Unit 4 - Piloted by Zi Jing with a purple color scheme. For Zi Jing's Ultimate Skill, her unit sprouts energy wings and shoots hundreds of "feathers" at her targets.
- YF-11 Unit 5 - Piloted by Fei Yi with an orange color scheme similar to the GN-003 Gundam Kyrios and GN-007 Gundam Arios from Mobile Suit Gundam 00. The unit's main weapons are retractable forearm blades. For Fei Yi's Ultimate Skill, the unit sprouts energy wings before it unleashes a dashing attack on its targets with its blades.
- YF-11 Unit 6 - Piloted by Zhou Zhi with a green color scheme similar to the RVF-25 Messiah of Luca Angelloni in Macross Frontier. For Zhou Zhi's Ultimate Skill, he releases six funnels that fire laser beams all around him.

The Space Migration Fleet also has other squadrons of Type Yi fighters flown by regular pilots, though they are rarely featured throughout the series.

== Production ==
According to the series' official blog website, Astro Plan was created to educate children ages 6–14 of justice and peace, as well as promote the cultural aspect of Chinese animation. The YF-10 and YF-11 Type Yi fighters are closely patterned after the People's Liberation Army Air Force main fighter aircraft - the Chengdu J-10 and Shenyang J-11, respectively.

In addressing the issue of plagiarism, the blog states that animation originated in Europe, but was copied and popularized by the United States before Japan and South Korea followed suit, and that the Chinese animation industry is simply following the pattern of its Asian neighbors.

== Merchandising ==
King Size YF-10 Unit #3 toy in box. Soda can used for size reference.

The series' episodes serve as commercials to promote a line of transformable toys manufactured for the Chinese market by Xing Yuan under the HyperWiz label. The Astro Plan line consists of all six Type Yi fighters available in four different sizes from 2-inch Micro to 12-inch King Size. A distinguishing feature of the toys is the Macross UN Spacy kite insignia imprinted on their back panels.

Transformable model kits of the fighter planes have also been released by HyperWiz as well.

Knockoffs of the toys exist in Mainland China and parts of Asia. In addition, bootlegs of a VF-1J Valkyrie toy from the Macross series, as well as the jets from the Transformers: Machine Wars series, are also widely sold as Astro Plan toys. HyperWiz has addressed the counterfeiting issue by posting a notice telling consumers how to differentiate the authentic toys from bootlegs.

== Reception and criticism ==
According to PCgames China, 149 out of 169 people voted "Not interested" in the series and there are plenty of negative comments posted on the quality of the series - most notably the 2D and 3D animations and the voice acting.

== See also ==
- Chinese animation
