= Bicycle Boy =

Chinese animated television series

- Country of origin: China
- Original language: Mandarin

Original release
- Network: China Central Television

Bicycle Boy (Chinese: 龙骑侠) is a Chinese animated television series broadcast on China Central Television. An animated film adaptation of the same name was released in 2015. A second film, Bicycle Boy 2, was released in 2017.

== Reception ==
In 2013 the series won the most important award for Chinese animation, the Golden Monkey Award.
