= Fruity Robo =

Children animated series

- Genre: Action; Adventure; Comedy
- Screenplay by: Tommy Wang; Dai Jin Peng; Li Shen Zhou; Zhao Jun Ju
- Directed by: Tommy Wang
- Voices of: Tommy Wang; Liu Xiao Tian; Liao Chun Yu; Lu Shuang; Zu Li Qing; Ju Yue Bin; Deng Hong; Zhao Ran; Chen Yi; Li Tuan; Ma Rui
- Theme music composer: Tommy Wang
- Opening theme: "Crazy Fruity Robo", performed by Lily Chen
- Ending theme: "Crazy Fruity Robo" (Instrumental)
- Country of origin: China
- Original language: Mandarin
- No. of seasons: 4
- No. of episodes: 208

Production
- Executive producer: Yao Zhao Ying
- Producer: Stephen Kam
- Running time: 23 minutes
- Production companies: Bluearc Animation Studios; Alpha Animation (seasons 1–3)

Original release
- Release: 1 April 2010 – 2019

Fruity Robo (Mandarin: 果宝特攻) is a CGI Chinese animated children's television series by Guangzhou BlueArc Culture Communications Company. This drama is both a sequel to "series Fruity Musketeers "(果冻三剑客) and the first season of the "Fruit Robo" series. Its sequels include "Fruit Robo 2", "Fruit Robo 3", "Fruit Robo 4: Armored Soul", and the movie "Fruit Robo: Fruit Escape".

Guangzhou Bluearc Animation Studios Co., Ltd. (Bluearc Animation Studios), referred to as Bluearc Culture, is a professional animation company focusing on original 3D animation creation and brand licensing management. Bluearc Culture was established on June 4, 2007 and is headquartered in Guangzhou. As of February 2024, the legal representative is Wang Naiguang.

In Vietnam, part 1 and part 2 of series is narrated by Doan Thi Tuyet Mai and released by Phuongnam Film.

== Plot ==
The Jelly Martial Arts Academy was originally a harmonious place where the jellies studied and played, until an uninvited guest came - a thief with a pair of eyebrows and rat eyes, who was one of the four evil thieves. To restore order, the abbot sent Ye Yan and Shangguan Ziyi to Tianshan Mountain, entrusting swords to Cheng Liuxiang and others. Rumors spread by Xiao Guoding led to conflicts, ensnaring Guo Yuan Tianzun in a battle. While the Fruity Warriors initially thrived, many sacrificed themselves, including Cheng Liuxiang. Ultimately, they revived to defeat their foes, reclaiming the seventh floor and reviving the fruit world, reuniting the jellies.

== Character Introduction ==
=== Fruity Boys ===
Name	Introduction
Cheng Liuxiang	Voiceover: Lu Shuang Character prototype: Chengzi First appearance: Episode 1 Introduction: The male lead, from a third-rate swordsman's family, poor and with only righteousness left. He likes Shangguan Ziyi. Brave, righteous, and slow-witted, especially in love. But he has great ambitions and wants to be a pillar of the motherland like Zhang Sanfeng. Excalibur: Sword of the Holy Way - Holy Way Sword (prototype Xuanyuan Sword) Excalibur net weight: unknown Sword Qi agitation index: infinite Fruit Mecha: Orange Zhanbao Special moves: Flying Freshness from the Sky, Zhanbao Holy Way Sword, Fruit Mecha Shift (with Pineapple Blowing Snow and Lu Xiaoguo), Jackfruit Multi-slash (Fruit Mecha after shifting), Rebirth of Fiery Fire, Righteous Universe Cannon, Fire Bullet (1st Generation) Motto: I laugh at the sky with my sword, and I will leave my heart and gallbladder to Kunlun Hate: Pineapple Blowing Snow said to squeeze the fresh orange into juice, but was flattened by Cheng Liuxiang with a hammer. Name origin: Chu Liuxiang from Gu Long's "Legend of Chu Liuxiang"
Pineapple Snow	Dubbing: Zu Qing Character prototype: Pineapple First appearance: Episode 1 Introduction: Male No. 2, from an ordinary family, likes Lihuashi, and lives at Ximenkou. He is a proud, arrogant but kind-hearted playboy. He is the smartest of the three musketeers. He is greedy for money. He thinks he is very smart and tries his best to learn business, but he always suffers losses. He has done a lot of things to flirt with women, but later he realized that he only likes Lihuashi. (In "Jelly Three Musketeers", he saved Lihuashi and called her "Shishi") He is cautious and observant, and always sees through the enemy's plots. He always comes up with a lot of bad ideas and gets into trouble. Only Lihuashi can restrain his playboy virtue. Every time he makes a mistake and is beaten by Lihuashi, he dare not fight back. Note: The last episode of Season 3. Already in the human world, in the fourth season he is the second of the Three Jelly Swordsmen Excalibur: The Emperor's Sword - Chixiao Sword (the original version of the Chixiao Sword that Emperor Gaozu used to kill the white snake) Sword Qi Excitement Index: 9.7 Fruit Treasure Mecha: Pineapple Battle Treasure Special Moves: Jackfruit Multi-Cut, Fire Bullets, Fruit Treasure Mecha Shift (with Cheng Liuxiang and Lu Xiaoguo), Fruit Lover Missile (after Fruit Treasure Mecha Shift) (1st Generation) Name: Blowing Snow, Flower Heart Pineapple Head, Brother Blowing Snow, Stinky Pineapple Catchphrase: I am Pineapple Blowing Snow, what I blow is not snow, but blood (xiě, pronounced the third tone), the blood on my sword! Why am I always the one who gets hurt? Hate: Blowing the Pineapple Brothers into Pineapple Pie. Name Appearance: Ximen Blowing Snow in Gu Long's "Legend of Lu Xiaofeng"
Lu Xiaoguo	Voiceover: Wang Wei Character prototype: Green Apple First appearance: Episode 1 Introduction: Male No. 3, from a wealthy family, very rich, and blessed to an exaggerated degree. He likes to spend money. His father is Lu Xiaofeng (mentioned by the Three Musketeers of Jelly), who makes iPhones, so he is very wealthy. He is simple and kind, innocent and cute, silly, a little stupid, can't count, and can't fire missiles accurately. He is always called intellectually disabled. He often gets lost, but he can always turn danger into safety when encountering problems. Fruity Robo Special Attack has been successful many times because of Lu Xiaoguo's blessing. Lu Xiaoguo, who calls himself a mainland poet, speaks eloquently and likes to recite a lot of poems. Excalibur: Sword of True Love - Divine General Sword (original Ganjiang Sword) Excalibur Net Weight: 7749 Jin 03 Liang 6 Qian Sword Qi Excitement Index: 8.5 Fruit Treasure Mecha: Little Fruit Battle Treasure Special Skills: Fruit Lover Missile, Fire Bullet, Butt Skill, Fruit Treasure Mecha Displacement (with Orange Fragrance and Pineapple Blowing Snow), Freshness from the Sky (after Fruit Treasure Mecha displacement), Love Combination Bomb (with Hua Ruyi) (1st Generation) Name: Little Fruit Brother Motto: I am not a casual person, but when I am casual, I am not a human being. Dislike: Blowing apples into apple pies, and seeing apple pies can rapidly increase combat effectiveness. Name Origin: Lu Xiaofeng from Gu Long's novel "Legend of Lu Xiaofeng"

=== Fruity Girls ===
Name	Introduction
Shangguan Ziyi	Voiced by: Zu Qing Character prototype: Strawberry First appearance: Episode 1 Introduction: The female lead, a beautiful and steady strawberry, a girlfriend with a fragrant orange fragrance. A young lady from the Shangguan family, her family has been officials for generations and has a noble status. The apple of Shangguan Jinhong's (Shangguan Ziyi's mother's) eye. Father Zhang Sanfeng, the navy minister of the court. Her original name was Zhang Ziyi, but she changed her surname to Shangguan because of her parents' divorce. Always takes care of other female agents like an older sister. Excalibur: The Noble Sword - Aozun Sword (the prototype of the Noble Sword, the Pure Jun Sword) Excalibur net weight: five catties, ten taels and three coins Sword Qi agitation index: 7.5 Fruit Robo: Strawberry Battle Treasure Special move: Berry Force Four-shooting Sword, Dangtou Yijian (1st generation) Address: Sister Ziyi, Ziyi, Miss Ziyi Personality: elegant, mature Classic lines: ⒈A salted fish is still a salted fish after thirty years, and it is absolutely impossible to become a great hero.: 2. Put down the butcher knife and become a Buddha; Name source: actress Zhang Ziyi
Pear Blossom Poetry	Dubbing: Lu Shuang Character prototype: Peach First appearance: Episode 1 Introduction: Female No. 2, a beautiful and noble Peach. Pineapple Blowing Snow's girlfriend, she speaks in fragments, and will go crazy if she is said to be heartbroken. In episode 35, the traitor killed the Heavy Artillery King because he said that Pineapple Blowing Snow didn't like her. Like Pineapple Blowing Snow, she is cautious and observant, and can see through the enemy's conspiracy. She is very noble and hates people who are as mercenary and philandering as Pineapple Blowing Snow, but she and Pineapple Blowing Snow like each other. Only she can control Pineapple Blowing Snow's philandering. Every time Pineapple Blowing Snow does something wrong and is beaten by her, he dare not fight back. Excalibur: Elegant Sword - Fengying Sword (the prototype is Chengying Sword, one of the three swords of Kong Zhou) Excalibur Net Weight: 4.326 jin Sword Qi Excitement Index: 7.0 Fruit Robo: Peach War Treasure Special Move: Shocking Peach Kill Name: Xiao Shishi, Shishi Personality: Tsundere, noble Cute Point: Stuttering, Tsundere and awkward personality Classic Lines: ⒈Men are the most likely to cheat. ⒉My Lihua Poetry is not about poetry, but about corpses, corpses everywhere! Name Origin: The Lihua Poetry of Poet Zhao Lihua
Flower Ruyi	Dubbing: Deng Hong Character prototype: Purple Grape First appearance: Episode 1 Introduction: Female No. 3, a lively and cute little grape, calls Lu Xiaoguo "Little Guo Ge" and is Lu Xiaoguo's girlfriend. Born in a wealthy family, she is as generous and compassionate as Lu Xiaoguo. She admires Lu Xiaoguo very much and often praises Lu Xiaoguo's poems. Excalibur: Sword of True Love - Xianyun Sword (prototype Moye Sword) Net weight: unknown Sword Qi Excitement Index: 8.5 Fruit Treasure Mecha: Grape Battle Treasure Special Skills: Ruyi Golden Hoop Stick, Lightning Grape Split, Love Combination Bomb (with Lu Xiaoguo) (1st Generation) Name: Ruyi Sister Personality: Innocent, cute Classic Lines: ⒈Wow, Brother Xiaoguo, you are so awesome! 2 Wo ka Wo Ka Wo Kakaka Origin of name: Hua Ruling from "The Legend of Lu Xiaofeng" by Gu Long
Pineapple Xiaowei	Dubbing: Deng Hong (Season 1) Character prototype: Pineapple First appearance: Fruity Robo Force Episode 18 Introduction: Female No. 4, a fellow tribesman of Pineapple Blowing Snow, a romantic encounter, a peach blossom, a beautiful pineapple. Refreshing, upright and cautious, proud, a little bit arrogant, a typical female hero in the rivers and lakes. For a while, she became a villain for her family, but later escaped. She is the rival of Li Huashi, but she also swore to her and is as close as sisters. Excalibur: Sword of Benevolence - Sword of Benevolence (Prototype Zhanlu Sword) Excalibur net weight: unknown Sword Qi Excitement Index: 10 Fruit Robo: Gathering War Treasures Special move: Fire bullets (1st generation) Name: Xiaowei, Aunt, Wei Classic lines: ⒈When everyone in the world doesn't believe in you, I believe in you too! ⒉Big bad guy! Today is your death day!: 3. Believe it or not, I will take you back to school and retake the college entrance examination!; Name source: Huang Pinyuan's song "Xiaowei" in 2002

=== The Four Evil Thieves ===
Name	Introduction
Dongfang Qiubai	Voiceover: Ju Yuebin Character prototype: Pitaya First appearance: Episode 1 Introduction: The second elder brother of Tianshan Guolao, and the younger brother of Feng Qingyang. He likes Tianshan Guolao, and his rival is Feng Qingyang. He is the founder of the fruit processing factory. Together with the four evil thieves, he silently guards Huaguoshan, but is mistaken for the big devil. Fruit Robo: Fire Dragon King Special move: Exploding Fire Dragon Bomb Name source: Dongfang Bubai and Dugu Qiubai in Jin Yong's novels (set as the son of Dongfang Bubai and Dugu Qiubai) Classic lines: I am the only one who is supreme in heaven and earth, and I will unify the world for thousands of years I am the only one who is supreme in heaven and earth, and the five devils are united as one, the devil king If you want to achieve extraordinary great things, you must use extraordinary means If the sky has feelings, it will also grow old, and the righteous path of the world is vicissitudes
A World Without Thieves	The leader of the four evil pirates: A World Without Thieves Voiceover: Li Tuan Character prototype: Sugar Cane First appearance: Episode 1 Introduction: The leader of the four evil pirates. He has a very high IQ and is very smart. He is determined to be the strongest pirate and defeat other pirates to maintain peace in the ocean. However, a seasickness completely shattered his wish. Fruit Robo: Explosion King Special moves: Explosion Fist, Explosion Lightning Cannon, Magic Explosion Fist, Magic Lightning Cannon (1st generation) Name source: Feng Xiaogang's 2004 movie A World Without Thieves Classic lines: If the water is too clear, there will be no fish; if the people are too mean, they will be invincible
Traitor	The second of the four evil thieves: Traitor Voiceover: Zhao Ran Character prototype: Sugar Cane First appearance: Episode 1 Introduction: The second of the four evil thieves. His stage name is Ximen Qing. He seems to like Shangguan Ziyi and has proposed to her at Shangguan's house. He has a high IQ and was once a high-ranking official in the capital. He is loyal. Who knows that one day, he was arrested because his name is Traitor. Fruit Robo: Heavy Artillery King (1st generation) Special moves: Magic Lightning Cannon, Brain Nerve Missile, Cross Ghost Boomerang (1st generation) Name origin: Idiom "Traitor"
Recognize the thief as your father	The third of the four evil thieves: Recognize the thief as your father Voiceover: Chen Yi Character prototype: Sugarcane First appearance: Episode 1 Introduction: The third of the four evil thieves. He likes to use force and is a gangster boss. Please note that he is a "loving gangster"! Once, he saw an old lady buying apples, holding a dagger, and without explaining clearly, he rushed to peel the apple for her. As a result, the old lady shouted: "Catch the thief!" As a result, he was seen by the government and was arrested and thrown into prison. Like to watch "Happy Cool Baby" (see "Fruity Robo 4" Episode 15) Fruity Robo: Sea Shark King Special move: Deadly trident knife (1st generation) Name origin: idiom "recognize the thief as your father"
thief with thieves' eyes	The fourth of the four evil thieves: thief with thieves' eyes Voiceover: Ju Yuebin Character prototype: Sugar Cane First appearance: Episode 1 Introduction: The fourth of the four evil thieves. He has a very low IQ and is very close to his second brother, the traitor. His wish is to be a bandit and dominate a mountain alone. Unfortunately, the mountain he dominated was really deserted (as shown when he sacrificed himself in the last episode of Fruity Robo Force Part 2). As a result, his bandit dream was shattered. I like to watch "Armor Hero" (see "Fruity Robo Force" Episode 7) Fruity Robo: Magic King Special moves: Kirin Cannon, Kirin Tornado Cannon, Kirin Arm, Purple Light Poison Dragon Bomb, Sweeping the Army (Generation 1) Name origin: Idiom "thief with thieves' eyes"

=== Fruit treasure old special attack ===
Name	Introduction
Feng Qingyang	Voiceover: Li Tuan Character prototype: Coconut First appearance: Episode 1 Introduction: The eldest brother of Tianshan Guolao, who likes Tianshan Guolao very much. He is also the senior brother of Dongfang Qiubai. He founded the Jelly Martial Arts Academy with the purpose of finding the owner of the Holy Sword, the Chixiao Sword, and the God Sword. On the surface, he is crazy and a little greedy for money. He often uses Qinggong to float around.In fact, he is unfathomable, and he is also the first person to know that Dongfang Qiubai is a good person. Fruit Robo: Coconut Zun (limited edition worldwide, and the only talking mecha, priced at 800 yuan) Special skills: Sword of the God of War, Dugu Nine Swords Classic lines: Don't be confused by the superficial phenomena of things When a person loses his sense of crisis, he is not far from death Name source: Feng Qingyang in Jin Yong's "Swordsman"
Tianshan Guolao	Voiceover: Deng Hong Character prototype: Qingmei First appearance: Episode 30 Introduction: Master of Teacher Yeyan, junior sister of Fangzhang and Dongfang Qiubai. When she was young, she was handsome. Because Fangzhang and Dongfang Qiubai were jealous of each other, Guolao used provocation to make them angry and leave.She lives in Tianshan all year round. Like Fangzhang, she often uses Qinggong to float around. She likes to invent things, all of which are "Gods and Ghosts Series", and gave three magic swords to the female special attack. Fruit Robo: Qingmeizun Special move: Tianshan Zhemei Hand Name source: Tianshan Tonglao in Jin Yong's novels

== Reception ==
The show was ranked as one of the top 10 best animated series in China.

The series has been criticized as unsuitable for children, as it is used to advertise toys.

== Song ==
- Part 1 - Fruit Robots (Chinese: 果 宝 特 攻)
- Part 2 - Special Fruits Team (Chinese: 疯狂 果 宝)

Song title	Singing	Lyric writing	compose music	Note
Fruity Robo	Chen Jieli	Wang Wei	Xian Qiwei	Theme Song

episode

The number of episodes that appear	name	lyrics
1	"Fruit Hell" and "A Thousand Miles Away" poetry recitation with music	Lihua Shi: I send you away, thousands of miles away, you are silent and black and white Pineapple Blowing Snow: Investment failed, the stock market crashed, and I still owed loan sharks Lihua Shi: I send you away, beyond the end of the world, are you still there Pineapple Blowing Snow: Lehman is gone, the bull market is gone, use a knife to pay off the debt (stab yourself with a retractable sword)
18	Covered Huang Baoxin's "Carmen" and "Pineapple Bun Headquarters" twice	Lu Xiaoguo (singing): Love is just an ordinary thing, what's so great about it? Men are just a pastime, nothing special at all~~ (waving a fan~)
33	"Villagers' Ambition" is an interesting version of "Only Hard Work Can Win"	Strawberry Village Chief: You recognize the enemy as your father and force us to fight each other Blueberry Village Chief: Killing each other is a last resort Strawberry Village Chief: Those who win the battle don’t have to die, they can still join the army Blueberry Village Chief: Those who lose will become slaves from now on Strawberry and Blueberry Village Chief: In fact, we really don’t want to, if we refuse to obey, we will be made into pudding Shangguan Ziyi: No, no, we will sell out our brothers for ourselves Lihua Shi and Hua Ruyi: We will never agree, we must fight to the end Fruit Girl Special Forces: Only hard work can win
50	A song sung by Stephen Chow and his senior brother in the movie Kung Fu Soccer	Hero: Jelly Academy is good Wuji: Very good Hero: Fruity Special Attack Power Wuji: Awesome Hero: He knows Tai Chi Sword Wuji: Tai Chi Sword Hero: I know Iron Head Kung Fu. Wuji: Kung Fu———— Soldier: Shut up (give Wuji a stick)
52	Seven-color lotus version of "Ode to Joy"	The seven-colored lotus is holy and beautiful, shining brightly on the earth. We are filled with passion and come to your temple. Your power can bring us together again. Under your glory, we unite as brothers. Fruity Robo Force, muster up courage and create a miracle in ratings. We swear to love each other and never separate from now on.
