= Spare Me, Great Lord! =

Chinese manhua series

- First manhua adaptation cover, featuring Lu Shu

大王饶命 Dawang Raoming
- Genre: Action, fantasy
- Author: The Speaking Pork Trotter (novel)
- Illustrator: Reading Culture
- Publisher: Harbin Publishing House
- Magazine: AC.QQ; Tencent Animation and Comics
- Original run: December 13 2019 – April 20 2024
- Collected volumes: 2

Spare Me, Great Lord!
- Directed by: Tianxing Wei
- No. of seasons: 3
- No. of episodes: 24+

Production
- Animator: Big Firebird Culture

Original release
- Network: Tencent Video
- Release: December 3, 2021 – present

Spare Me, Great Lord! (Chinese: 大王饶命, romanized: Dawang Raoming) is a Chinese web novel written by The Speaking Pork Trotter, serialized on the website Qidian August 2017 to November 2018. A manhua adaptation illustrated by Reading Culture was serialized on the platform AC.QQ from December 2019 to April 2024. A donghua adaptation produced by Big Firebird Culture began airing in December 2021.

== Characters ==
Lu Shu
Lu Xiaoyu
Carol Odin Johnson
Li Xianyi
Nie Ting
Jiang Shuyi
Li Yixiao
Cao Qingci
Chen Baili
Gao Shenyin
Ye Lingling
Zhi Wei
Liang Che
Liu Li
Li Qi
Li Guoyang
Shi Xuejin
Yaeko Sakura

== Adaptations ==
=== Manhua ===
A manhua adaptation illustrated by Reading Culture was serialized on the platform AC.QQ from December 13, 2019, to April 20, 2024.

=== Donghua ===
A donghua adaptation was produced by Big Firebird Culture and aired from December 3, 2021, to February 11, 2022. A second season aired from Dececember 30, 2023, to January 27, 2024, and a third season will begin airing on October 3, 2026.

==== Series overview ====
Season	Episodes	Originally released	
Season	Episodes	First released	Last released
1	12	December 3, 2021	February 11, 2022
2	12	December 30, 2023	January 27, 2024
3	16	October 3, 2026	TBA
