= Lao Mountain Taoist =

- Distributed by: Shanghai Animation Film Studio
- Release date: 1981
- Country: China
- Language: Mandarin

Lao Mountain Taoist (Chinese: 崂山道士) is a Chinese animated film produced by the Shanghai Animation Film Studio with stop motion-animated puppets and ink paint.

== Background ==
The production was finished in 1981, and in 2006 the film was voted as one of the most popular domestic animations. Numerous novels and publications have been released under the same name in the past. The story, characters and contents are based on the ancient Chinese folklore story collection Strange Stories from a Chinese Studio.

== Plot ==
A long time ago, there was a young man called Wang Qi. When he heard that there were many immortals in Lao Mountain, he went there at once. There was a Taoist who still looked young although he was very old. Wang Qi became one of his pupils. During the first month, Wang Qi went to the hills for woods with others every day and listened to the instructions of his teacher patiently. In the second month, he felt that he could not stand the hard and tiring life, but he still waited for the teacher to teach him the magical skills. In the third month, he could not bear the suffering any longer. Upon requests, the Taoist taught Wang Qi the incantations to recite for walking through walls.

== VCD release ==
The first known packaged release of the film was in the 1996 VCD.
