= Release that Witch =

Chinese manhua series

放开那个女巫 Fangkai Nage Nuwu
- Genre: Action, fantasy, isekai
- Author: Er Mu (novel)
- Illustrator: Dr Woodman; Yuè Wén
- Publisher: AC.QQ; Bilibili Manhua
- Magazine: Bilibili Manhua
- Original run: 2017 – present

Release that Witch
- Directed by: Meng Sun
- No. of episodes: 8

Production
- Animator: Thundray

Original release
- Network: Bilibili (streaming); Crunchyroll (streaming)
- Release: March 2 – April 20, 2026

Release that Witch (Chinese: 放开那个女巫, romanized: Fangkai Nage Nuwu) is a Chinese fantasy isekai manhua written by Er Mu and illustrated by Jiang Jia Meizi, based on Er Mu's web novel of the same name. It began serialization on the platform Bilibili Manhua in 2017. A donghua adaptation produced by Thundray aired from March to April 2026.

== Plot ==
Roland, a modern man reborn as a prince in the dangerous Border Town, rescues the witches Anna and Nana Pine from the Church. Harnessing their extraordinary powers, he fuses magic and technology to craft weapons, armies, and steam engines to defend his people. As the Demon Moon rises and conspiracies close in on his family, Roland must lead a revolution to protect his allies and reshape the world.

== Characters ==
Cheng Yan/Roland Wimbledon
Anna
Carter Lannis
Nightingale
Barov
Nana Pine
Wendy
Tilly Wimbledon
Garcia Wimbledon
Timothy Wimbledon
Lightning
Osmond Ryan
Ashes
Echo
Agatha
Leaf
Scroll
Isabella

== Adaptations ==
=== Manhua ===
A manhua adaptation illustrated by Dr Woodman and Yuè Wén began serialization on the platform Bilibili Manhua in 2017.

=== Donghua ===
A donghua adaptation was produced by Thundray and directed by Meng Sun and was streamed on Bilibli and Crunchyroll from March 2 to April 20, 2026.
