= Cinderella Chef =

2018 Chinese web anime series

- Chinese: 萌妻食神
- Literal meaning: Adorable Food Goddess
- Hanyu Pinyin: Méng Qī Shí Shén
- Genre: Cuisine, Chinese culture
- Based on: Cinderella Chef by Ziyi 281
- Directed by: Ni Jiafei
- Opening theme: "The Journey of Taste" "Mimosa"
- Country of origin: China
- Original language: Mandarin
- No. of seasons: 3
- No. of episodes: 36

Production
- Producers: Luo Li, Li Ni
- Running time: 21 minutes
- Production companies: Wawayu Animation China Literature bilibili Yuewen Animation & Comics

Original release
- Network: Bilibili
- Release: December 29, 2018 – September 13, 2022

Cinderella Chef (Chinese: 萌妻食神; pinyin: Méng Qī Shí Shén), aka Meng Qi Shi Shen, Adorable Food Goddess, is a donghua ONA series aired in 2018, published by Yuewen Animation (阅文动画) and produced by Wawayu Animation (娃娃鱼动画) in Hangzhou. The animation was adapted from the Web novel written by Ziyi 281 (紫伊281).

== Plot ==
Ye Jiayao is a modern-day celebrity chef who loves traditional Chinese recipes and often experiments with them. However, when a food experiment goes wrong, she travels back in time to the ancient times, where she becomes the daughter of a magistrate with the name Ye Jin Xuan. When she wakes up she is suddenly kidnapped to Hei Fang Camp where she meets the leader of the bandits, Xia Chun Yu, the young master of the Jing An Marquis manor, who is actually an undercover agent for the king. He had infiltrated the Black Wind Fortress bandits to investigate a plot to overthrow the king. The two then get engaged in a fake marriage. Ye Jia Yao starts to win over hearts, including Xia Chun Yu's, with her superb cooking skills and modern street smarts.

== Characters ==
Character	Chinese voice actor	Introduction
Ye Jiayao (叶佳瑶)	Shi Si (十四)	Main character, formerly the editor-in-chief of a modern food magazine, died of poisoning by accidentally eating toadstools. She traveled to the ancient bride who was also dead, Ye Jinxuan (叶瑾萱), to be reborn, and became the wife of the third master Xia Chunyu. She has an optimistic and quirky personality, and has superb cooking skill.
Xia Chunyu (夏淳于)	Sun Ye (孙晔)	The third head of Heifengzhai, the real identity of the undercover Jing'an Hou Shizi, is eager to gain the recognition of the emperor and his family and become a qualified successor of Jing'an Hou. He has a proud personality and a poisonous tongue, but he loves Ye Jiayao's cooking.
Helian Jing (赫连景)	Shen Dawei (沈达威)	The little prince of Helian Palace, following the example of Xia Chunyu and his brother Helian Xuan, debuted in episode 6, and unexpectedly became friends with Ye Jiayao, who was disguised as a man in trouble. Pure personality and integrity. In the past, although he was born a distinguished person, it was difficult to make close friends, so he attached great importance to the relationship with Ye Jiayao.
