= The Blue Mouse and the Big Faced Cat =

- Promo
- Country of origin: China
- No. of episodes: 30 episodes x 10 min (1993 Part I); 39 episodes x 12 min (2000 Part II)

Original release
- Network: CCTV
- Release: 1993 – 2000

The Blue Mouse and the Big Faced Cat (Chinese: 蓝皮鼠大脸猫; pinyin: lánpíshǔ dàliǎnmāo) is a Chinese animated series from mainland China, based on Ge Bing's fairy tale 'The Blue Mouse and the Big Faced Cat'. The first part was produced in 1993 and the second in 2000. It traced in an American cartoon TV series: Tom and Jerry.

== Background ==
It was voted one of China's top 10 domestic animations in 2006.

== Story ==
A humorous tale of laughter and mischief between the star duo of the Magic Circus, the Blue Mouse and the Big-Faced Cat. Blue Mouse is clever and helpful, while Big-Faced Cat is greedy, lazy, and charmingly naïve. Along with two beetles, Jin Doudou and Lu Fanfang, this dynamic duo has many adventures.
