= The Dreaming Girl =

- Genre: Surrealism
- Country of origin: China
- Original language: Mandarin
- No. of episodes: 26

Original release
- Network: CCTV
- Release: December 12, 2005 – January 6, 2006

The Dreaming Girl (Chinese: 梦里人) is a Chinese animated surrealist television series. It is produced by "Beijing Golden Pinasters Animation Company" in Beijing with the collaboration of CCTV.

== Background ==
The production was acknowledged as an official project as early as 2001. The show is known for its heavy emphasis on high-level detailed environment.

== Story ==
The story is about a 16-year-old school girl and her friends in an ever-expanding story dealing with contemporary teenage problems of growing up. Fantasy and dreams add elements of surrealism.
