= Paola Voci =

Italian-born academic

- Born: Italy
- Education: Indiana University Bloomington
- Scientific career
- Workplaces: University of Otago

Paola Voci is an Italian-born academic specialising in Chinese language and culture, film and media studies, visual culture, and digital culture. She is a professor at the University of Otago in Dunedin, New Zealand.

== Biography ==
Voci was born in Italy. She holds a B.A. with honours in Chinese language and literature from the University of Venice, a diploma in film theory and practice from the Beijing Film Academy, and an MA in East Asian studies and a PhD in Chinese from Indiana University Bloomington.

She served as president of NZASIA (The New Zealand Asian Studies Society) from 2015 to 2017.

== Publications ==
- Voci, P., & Luo, H. (2018). Screening China's soft power. London: Routledge.
- Voci, P., & Leckie, J. (2011). Localizing Asia in Aotearoa. Auckland, N.Z: Dunmore Pub.
- Voci, P. (2010). China on video: Smaller-screen realities. London: Routledge.
