= Maiquan & Keke =

Chinese television series

Maiquan & Keke (麦圈可可) is a Chinese children's education animated series produced by Ningbo Kaku Cartoon Making Co. Ltd. It centers on the kids Maiquan and Keke, and Rouwan the dog in their adventures.

The characters were created in 2007 by Hu Yang and two students of College of Science and Technology Ningbo University and were featured in manhua, with its first installment completed at the end of 2008 and the second one completed in mid April 2009. The manhua is about the primary characters learning the ancient history of Ningbo.

== List of Maiquan & Keke animated series ==
- Maiquan & Keke's Adventure (麦圈可可漫游记)
- Maiquan & Keke's Ancient Adventures (麦圈可可远古大冒险)
- Maiquan & Keke's Treasure Seeking Story (麦圈可可寻宝记)
- Maiquan & Keke's Saving Earth Adventure (拯救地球麦圈可可在行动; China Education Television premiere on March 7, 2011)
- Treasure Land Adventure of Maiquan Coco (麦圈可可宝岛奇遇记; features Taiwan)
- School Weird Accident Book (校园奇异事件簿)
- Wonder Dog conquers Mech City (神犬勇闯机械城)
- Xiha Family (嘻笑一家亲)
- Under-sea City Adventure (智取海底城)
- Animal Star Adventure (动物行星大探险)
- Super stone star adventures (超石器星球历险记)
- Explore Sky City of Brave Alliance (勇者联盟之探蔚蓝之城)
- Kessen Machine King of Brave Alliance (勇者联盟之决战机械王)
- Interstellar Sailing of Brave Alliance (勇者联盟之星际远航)
- Harmony Brings Wealth (家和万事兴)
- Guard Animal Galaxy (守护动物星系)
- Xin Maiquan Keke Zhi Meishi Tianxia (新麦圈可可之美食天下; 2017)
