= Tortoise Hanba's Stories =

- Also known as: Hanbagui
- Country of origin: China
- Original language: Mandarin
- No. of series: 2
- No. of episodes: 104

Production
- Running time: about 12 minutes

Original release
- Network: CCTV
- Release: 9 September 2006 – 2008

Tortoise Hanba's Stories (Chinese: 憨八龟的故事) is a large scale 3D-CG Chinese animation TV series in China. It is also referred to as The Story of Hanbagui or Hanbagui.

== Background ==
The show was produced by "Shenzhen Toonring Animation" in Shenzhen with an estimated final budget of 30 million RMB (about $US 3.7 million). It has completed 52 episodes by the 2nd half of 2006, and is projecting 500 episodes over the next few years.

== Story ==
The first 52 episodes called “Falling on the Earth” tells how “Hanbagui”, the turtle, comes across the teenagers “Abu”, “Annie”, “Siaomei” on earth and makes friends with them. He goes looking for his lost fellows “Baobaoxiong”, “Tiejiaxiaozi”, “Baizhangtia", “Baijingling”, “Qixingpiao”. It is a comedy.
