= SkyEye =

- Country of origin: China
- Original language: Mandarin
- No. of episodes: 500

Production
- Running time: 7 minutes

Original release
- Network: Hangzhou Television
- Release: 27 January 2005 – present

SkyEye (Chinese: 天眼) is a combo 2D and 3D-CG Chinese animated TV series in China.

== Background ==
The production budget is estimated to be 24 million RMB (about $US 3 million). Crew also include staff from the Central Academy of Drama, CCTV and Beijing Film Academy involving hundreds of people. It was voted one of China's top 10 domestic animations in 2006.

== Story ==
The story is about a boy with a magical eye in the sky instituting justice and honesty.
