= Little Cherry =

Chinese media franchise

Little Cherry (Chinese: 小樱桃; pinyin: Xiǎo Yīng Táo) is a Chinese media franchise created by Yang Shangjun. Owned by the Zhengzhou-based Zhengzhou Little Cherry Cartoon Art Co., it is primarily comedy manhua featuring a girl whose name is Little Cherry. It is titled Xoyto in English.

== History ==
The Little Cherry manhua debuted in October 1998. It was originally titled "Xiǎo Yīng Zi" before Yang changed it to appear more Chinese. Upon initial publication, the comic strip gained popularity in few months, and Yang exited her job with the magazine Comics Monthly (漫画月刊) to work as a freelancer in September 1999. In 2000, Zhejiang Literature and Art Publishing House published the first Little Cherry comic book volumes which initially sold out. In the same year, Yang registered the Zhengzhou Little Cherry Cartoon Art Co. At one point there was a circulation of 17 million comic book copies. Derivative works and products included beverages, Flash animation, and toys.

In 2008, a 26-episode animated television series adaptation debuted on CCTV. The second season premiered in July 2010, when the third season was reportedly in development.

In October 2012, the Little Cherry Rescue Angels comic received the Golden Dragon Award for best children's comic.

== Titles in other languages ==
- Arabic: كرزة الصغيرة
- Vietnamese: Cô Nhóc Tiểu Anh Đào

== Plagiarism controversy ==
Media sources including Sina Games and Taiwan-based Liberty Times have included comparisons between the Little Cherry animated series and the Japanese manga and anime series Chibi Maruko-chan, such as their similar titles, in articles about alleged plagiarism in Chinese animation.
