= Century Sonny =

- Country of origin: China
- Original language: Mandarin
- No. of episodes: 52

Production
- Running time: 18 minutes

Original release
- Network: CCTV-Children
- Release: 10 May 2006

Century Sonny: The Adventure of the Extra-Galactic Prince (Chinese: 精灵世纪) is the first large scale 3D-CGI Chinese animated series in China.

== Background ==
Lonma company invested 1.5 billion RMB (about US$188 million) on the 52-episode series. Each episode is approximately 18 minutes. In May 2006 Century Sonny started being broadcast on CCTV, 3 special cartoon channels and local satellite TV channels, totally more than 400 TV channels in China. Century Sonny ranked as the top 3 most popular cartoon program on the CCTV station. It is a landmark Chinese animation series due to the unprecedented scale of the rendered minutes.

== Story ==
The story began in the Numen Kingdom in an extra-galactic planet. Source of Life, the protector of numina and human beings, had been safeguarded in the Numen Kingdom for centuries. The Evil Numina attempted to control the planet. They invaded the Numen Kingdom and captured the King. Their ultimate conspiracy was to despoil the Stone of Life that powerful magic stone to help them control the entire universe. The little Prince Coco of the Numen Kingdom was the only one who escaped from the brutal invasion and landed in Planet Earth with the Stone of Life. Under the protection of a mysterious fairy Noah, the little Prince escaped from the monsters’ pursuit. Later he met a group of funny stationery characters and toys living in a human being's house and serving their little master. Prince Coco's presence made these stationery characters and toys understand that they were facing the grand responsibility to save the world. To help Coco save the world meant they ought to leave their master. That was a tough decision. Nonetheless, the Evil Numina were approaching, and were causing great dangers to the little master. The stationery and toys united together to help Coco fight the Evil Numina. In an effort to defeat the evil force and save the universe, Prince Coco, the stationery and the toys began their long adventure back to the Numen Kingdom.

== Reception ==
Surveys were conducted in 53 cities around China between May and June 2006, and the show obtained the best viewers ratings among domestic productions. In a competition called "The Top 10 Favorite Local Animations For Chinese Youth" held in Beijing in October 2006, the show out-performed 169 other contestants and received the highest votes. Coming in 2007, singers and movie stars from Emperor Entertainment Group in Hong Kong will sing the theme songs and act as voice actors.

== Merchandise ==
Merchandises range from toy, clothes, stationary, ornaments, branded food and beverages.
