= Little Soldier Zhang Ga =

- Film poster
- Directed by: Sun Lijun
- Written by: Sun Lijun; Ma Hua
- Produced by: Sun Lijun
- Starring: Duan Zefan; Jiang Kun; Huang Lei; Yu Lan; Sun Jia
- Production companies: Ai Yi Mei Xun Animation Production Company; Beijing Television; Beijing Film Academy Youth Film Production Unit
- Release date: June 9, 2006 (China)
- Running time: 80 minutes
- Country: China
- Language: Mandarin
- Budget: 12 million RMB

Little Soldier Zhang Ga (Chinese: 小兵张嘎; pinyin: Xiao Bing Zhang Ga) is a Chinese animated feature film from mainland China. The film is also referred to as Zhang Ga, The Soldier Boy. It is adapted from the Chinese children's novel of the same name, by Xu Guangyao (徐光耀), which was based on the true story of Yan Xiufeng.

== Plot ==
The story is set in Baiyangdian, in Hebei Province, and is based on the backdrop of the Chinese Civil War and the Second Sino-Japanese War with character Zhang Ga in the middle of the chaos along with the Eighth Route Army. The real story is based on the actual person Yan Xiufeng, whose childhood name was Gazi, who was born in Baiyangdian.

== Background ==
One film (1963) and one TV series (2004) with the same name precede the animated version, with more mature content featured in both. The animated version was a 12 million RMB investment (about US $1.5 million), and was modified for younger audiences. The film's production lasted six years, and its production crew consisted of about 600 people.

Little Soldier Zhang Ga was made in a collaboration between "Ai Yi Mei Xun Animation Production Company", a US-funded Chinese company, in association with Beijing Television and the Youth Film Production Unit at Beijing Film Academy. The students and faculty from the Academy worked together to keep production costs down. It is the first self-produced Beijing animated film created entirely with private investments.

The film's theatrical release was timed to coincide with the 60th anniversary of China's War of Resistance Against Japan.

== Translations of the novel ==
English translation, by Wu Wenyuan: Little Soldier Chang Ka-tse

== Awards and nominations ==
In 2005, Little Soldier Zhang Ga won the Outstanding Animation award at the 11th China Huabiao Film Awards. In 2007, it was nominated for Best Animated Film at the 26th Golden Rooster Awards.

== See also ==
- List of animated feature-length films
- Minjie Chen, The Sino-Japanese War and Youth Literature: Friends and Foes on the Battlefield (Routledge, 2016).ISBN 9781138859692
