= The Adventures of Little Carp =

- Country of origin: China
- No. of seasons: 1
- No. of episodes: 52

Original release
- Network: CCTV-Children (China); HodHod English
- Release: 2007

The Adventures of Little Carp (小鲤鱼历险记 Xiǎo Lǐ Yú Lì Xiǎn Jì) is a half-hour Chinese animated series adapted from the Chinese folktale "The Carp Jumps Over the Dragon Gate" (鲤鱼跳龙门). The series revolves around a carp called Bubbles and his friends.

== Plot ==
Bubbles, a carp, lives in Carp Lake with his grandmother, who often tells him about the legendary, powerful ruler of the seas and the rivers: the Dragon, whom Bubbles idolises. One day, Bubbles encounters Evil Snake, who pretends that he is the Dragon King. Evil Snake and his two accomplices, Lobby and Bogart, accompany Bubbles to the lake, where Bubbles' grandmother suspects that he is an impostor. No one believes her at first until his "dragon horns" and fake skin slip from his body, and his identity is revealed.

In anger, Evil Snake turns Bubbles' grandmother into a bubble in a fierce fight. Angry, Bubbles searches for the real dragon to revive his grandmother, and avenge her death by finding the five dragon scales left by the Dragon in order to beat Evil Snake. Along the way, he meets new friends, including the imposing Aku, the sassy Mei Mei, and the timid Erl, while Evil Snake and his henchmen relentlessly pursue Bubbles.

== Main characters ==
- Bubbles (泡泡) - Bubbles is a curious young carp with the ability to blow bubbles. He has been living with his grandmother, to whom he is very loyal. Bubbles meets Mei-Mei and Aku at a circus run by Mr. Octavio the octopus, who invites him perform in his circus. Bubbles is golden coloured and has red fins, and he grows wings when he activates the golden scale which is part of the five dragon scales that have the power of the dragon. He is loyal, brave and always stands up for what's right, but because he is so kind, he is sometimes duped by villains. Bubbles is the first to gain a scale which is the golden scale, which is loosely based on the Chinese Element Gold. The golden scale is activated when the phrase "My heart is like iron, and it is indestructible!" Bubbles also blows bubbles to confuse his enemies, to send messages, to create protective spheres, or just for fun.
- Aoqi (阿酷) - Sometimes called simply "Aku", Aoqi is a magician seahorse. Aoqi's parents were killed by Evil Snake when he was very young, and Mr Octavio later adopted him. Aoqi later learnt magic to defeat his foe. Aoqi is very smart, and when the gang finds themselves in sticky situations, he is usually the first to come up with a plan. He is depicted as pompous before joining the group, but stops after Bubbles saves his life. Aoqi is very kind despite his stern looks and bossy attitude. Aoqi fights mostly with his wand, and has also been depicted in episodes as having great speed. Aoqi is the second one to gain a scale, which is the blue/water scale. Which is loosely based on the Chinese Element Water It is activated when he says the phrase "Brave and resourceful, my heart flies free!" It upgrades his wand so that it can turn into whatever Aku calls for.
- Xiao Mei Mei (小美美) is an anthropomorphic jellyfish. She is a singer who performs as the main star in Mr. Octavio's circus. She is sometimes depicted as a diva but tends to be the most forgiving and sensible of the group. She also likes anything that is cute and beautiful and hates things that are ugly. Mei Mei is the third one to gain a scale, which is the emerald scale. Which is loosely based on the Chinese Element Wood. She activates it by singing unlike the other three, but occasionally has used the phrase "I am the voice of the ocean!" The activation of her chip causes her singing to be very powerful as it can calm down anything and stop it.
- Erl/Xuang Mian Gui (双面龟) is a timid turtle that has the ability to remove his shell, which is two-sided. He is the first one to befriend Bubbles. He had previously been forced to work for Evil Snake, but changed for the sake of his beloved Mei Mei and because he has grown to see Bubbles and Aku as his friends. Erl typically makes poor decisions, thinking that his actions will make Mei-Mei happy. He often exaggerates his abilities and inflates his exploits to new people they meet, but in reality is a coward who runs away from any kind of danger. This changes when he is given his own scale, the fire scale, Which is loosely based on the Chinese Element Fire. after proving that he is brave. He activates it with the phrase "By the power of fire, give me strength!" He gains the ability to control fire and every attack he makes is strengthened by fire.
- Mr. Octavio (章鱼) Mr. Octavio is an octopus and the elderly ringleader of the "Dream Circus", where Aku and Mei Mei perform, and is more of a grandfather figure to Bubbles and a kind mentor. He was the first owner to get the golden scale in his youth, which he passes to Bubbles many years later. He is later captured by Evil Snake. Mr. Octavio is not mentioned or appears in any episodes until the last quarter of the miniseries, having been turned into a monster and trapped in a trench, where he eats many of the fish. Fortunately, Bubbles and the gang released him from the spell eventually.
- Giant Tortoise
- Evil Snake (癞皮蛇) is an anthropomorphic seasnake with boils on his body, who calls himself the Dragon King. He usually wears a fake blue skin which resembles a hood, dragon horns to look like one and a magic mirror to see things. It can shrink, and he usually wears it between his horns. When the snake heard about the five magic scales and that maybe they could turn him into a real dragon he sets up to find them but he didn't expect that Bubbles and his friends would try to get all the magic scales as well. He then later gains a powerful item known as the Poisonous Fang that was passed down by his ancestors, and is helped by his two generals Lobby and Bogart and then by his cousin Ray. Evil Snake has magical powers e.g. turning into a stone, and unleashing electric snakes. He used to work for the real dragon with Master Phoenix and Father Sea Monster before it died. He is finally defeated by Bubbles and friends when they jumped the Dragon's Gate.
- Lobby is one of the Evil Snake's generals, the other one being Bogart. He is a lobster which is the brains of the two as he is the one that makes up most of their plots to trick the gang. He and Bogart usually disguises themselves to trick Bubbles and the gang and gets a daily zap from their lord if they fail. He is also more deceitful than Bogart as he can be seen plotting a lot more to overthrow Evil Snake. He attacks by throwing claw-like projectiles but they temporarily melt in one episode when Mei Mei activates the emerald chip. He commands a group of small lobsters (they could be prawns) to patrol the area. He often masquerades as the 'White Jellyfish', and is killed when he falls into the lava with Bogart.
- Bogart is one of the Evil Snake's generals, the other one being Lobby. He is a fat catfish who acts as the brawn of the group. He doesn't usually understands what Lobby is thinking but is very suspicious of him being a traitor to their lord. He commands a group of pond loaches to spy on Lobby and patrol the area. He often masquerades as the 'Black Jellyfish, and is also killed when he argues with Lobby on who should jump over the Dragon Gate.
- Ray is a stingray and Evil Snake's cousin and a minor villain, who is later his second-in-command after he helps the Snake get the Poisonous Fang that belongs to their ancestors. He appears to the Snake just moments after Bubbles and the gang leaves the snake in the Coral Forest. He has been swallowed by the Evil Snake as he could not catch Bubbles and his gang.

== Episodes ==
The following is the list of the Season's Series (52 episodes)

| No. overall | No. in season | Title | Original release date |
|---|---|---|---|
| 1 | 1 | "Bubble Gets into Trouble" (Chinese: 泡泡闯祸) | TBA |
In the Carp Lake surrounded by mountains, there was a naughty little carp named Bubbles who always got into trouble. This time, Bubble left the Carp Lake after getting into trouble.
| 2 | 2 | "Adventures in the Dragon Palace" (Chinese: 龙宫奇遇) | TBA |
Bubbles saw the mangy snake, mistaken him for a real dragon, and admired him very much.
| 3 | 3 | "Disaster Is Coming" (Chinese: 大难临头) | TBA |
The two-faced turtle wants to tell Bubbles the true identity of the Mangy Snake, but every time he wants to say it, he is interrupted by unexpected circumstances.
| 4 | 4 | "Tears Farewell to Relatives" | TBA |
Bubbles brought the "real dragon", and the carp lake was abuzz with excitement as the villagers came to admire the majesty of the "real dragon".
| 5 | 5 | "Wandering Show" (Chinese: 流浪表演) | TBA |
Bubbles met the magician Aku. He naively thought that Aku's magic could save his grandma, so he decided to join the art troupe and learn from Aku.
| 6 | 6 | "Two Stars Face Off" (Chinese: 双星对峙) | TBA |
Bubble's performance won applause from the audience, which attracted the attention of Captain Octopus, who temporarily agreed to let him stay in the art troupe.
| 7 | 7 | "Panacea" (Chinese: 灵丹妙药) | TBA |
In order to prove that he is the real number one, Aku prepares a magic trick that is both thrilling and magical, but an accident happened during the performance.
| 8 | 8 | "The leader of the Troupe worked hard" (Chinese: 团长苦心) | TBA |
Bubbles left the art troupe sadly, and encountered a mudslide on the road. At the critical moment, the octopus leader used the power of the golden scales to protect Bubbles.
| 9 | 9 | "Star Bubble" (Chinese: 明星泡泡) | TBA |
Fat Catfish found the underwater art troupe, led his loach soldiers to show off their power, and clashed with Aku. Fortunately, the appearance of Little Meimei, with her beauty and singing voice calmed Fat Catfish, and he obeyed Little Meimei's orders and left.
| 10 | 10 | "The Eve of Performance" (Chinese: 演出前夜) | TBA |
The underwater art troupe failed to escape, as they were intercepted by Fat Catfish and taken to the Pseudo Dragon Palace. Fat Catfish secretly complained to Mangy Snake, saying that Lobster secretly interrogated Ju Ao and also hid a mysterious map.
| 11 | 11 | "to celebrate" (Chinese: 大闹庆典) | TBA |
Little Meimei was forced to sing a song written by Lobster to please the Mangy Snake. Everyone laughed, but the Mangy Snake was furious and forced everyone to admit that tickling is a noble act. Accompanied by Bubble's face-changing stunt, Aku took to the stage to perform magic.
| 12 | 12 | "Golden Scales" (Chinese: 金色鳞片) | TBA |
Under the leadership of the Two-Faced Turtle, Paopao and the others rescued Captain Octopus and Little Meimei. However, Mangy Snake got the news and led his pursuers to arrive, Captain Octopus was also seriously injured.
| 13 | 13 | "Where to Go" (Chinese: 走向何处) | TBA |
With the help of the power of the Golden Scale, Bubbles and others escaped from the Dragon Palace. The arrogant Aku ignored everyone's efforts convincing him to stay, and left alone.
| 14 | 14 | "Golden Toad Paradise" (Chinese: 金蟾乐园) | TBA |
Bubbles and his party came to Golden Toad Paradise and were deeply attracted by the wonderful amusement facilities here. They enjoyed themselves for a whole day.
| 15 | 15 | "Misfortune Comes from the Sky" (Chinese: 祸从天降) | TBA |
The entire amusement system was in chaos, order was broken, alarms were blaring, the park gates was closed, and all the tourists were in panic.
| 16 | 16 | "Return to the Snake Cave" (Chinese: 重返蛇窟) | TBA |
The Mangy Snake sent Lobster to the Golden Toad Paradise to collect the debt. The old Toad reported to the Lobster that the Golden Toad hid a magical treasure box. The Lobster forced the Golden Toad to hand over the box.
| 17 | 17 | "Looking for the Trace" (Chinese: 寻踪觅迹) | TBA |
Bubbles hugged the treasure box and was frightened. However, the strange thing is that the mangy snake turned a blind eye to him. It turned out that the golden scales and the treasure box had a reaction, Bubbles became transparent, and the bubbles left the Dragon Palace in full view of the public.
| 18 | 18 | "Sapphire Blue Scales" | TBA |
Aku lost consciousness and completely sidedwith the Golden Toad. Bubble had no choice but to fight with Aku. During the fight, the blue scales fell out of the box, awakening Aku's consciousness.
| 19 | 19 | "Golden Toad's Revenge" (Chinese: 金蟾复仇) | TBA |
The golden toad stole the blue scale and went to find the mangy snake alone to settle the score. In the Dragon Palace, although Golden Toad has the magic power of Blue Scale, he cannot defeat the Mangy Snake. At the critical moment, Bubbles and the others came, and Golden Toad was very moved.
| 20 | 20 | "Water Hyacinth Ze" (Chinese: 水葫芦泽) | TBA |
Bubbles and the others escaped again, and the mangy snake became furious. The lobster and the fat catfish were beaten up again, and they had to catch Bubbles and the others immediately. When Bubbles and the others arrived at Water Hyacinth Zee, Fat Catfish had already laid an ambush and asked for help from the Water Hyacinth King, who was friendly with them.
| 21 | 21 | "Black Hole Water Scorpion" (Chinese: 黑洞水蝎) | TBA |
The Poisonous Water Scorpion used its poisonous pincers to capture Bubbles and Aku and asked for credit from the Lobster. Unexpectedly, the Lobster went back on its word and not only failed to fulfill its promise, but also attacked and assassinated the Poisonous Water Scorpion.
| 22 | 22 | "Mirage" (Chinese: 海市蜃楼) | TBA |
Bubble and his friends found a magical castle on the road and Bubbles really wanted to go in, but Little Meimei remembered the trap in Golden Toad Paradise and was very suspicious of the Magic Castle. The two sides couldn't argue and had to part ways.
| 23 | 23 | "To encounter Amnesia" (Chinese: 遭遇忘情) | TBA |
In the castle, Bubbles and Aku encounter all kinds of strange things, and are trapped in them. When they realize the danger, they realize too late that everything is a trap.
| 24 | 24 | "The Mystery of Dragon Scales" (Chinese: 龙鳞之谜) | TBA |
In the water prison, Ju Ao did not eat Bubbles. It turned out that Ju Ao was the assistant of the real dragon. He told Bu Bu that the real dragon had sacrificed to save the world.
| 25 | 25 | "Cross the sea by a trick" (Chinese: 瞒天过海) | TBA |
Two-faced Turtle and Little Meimei came to rescue Bubbles and Aku, but unfortunately they were caught and thrown into the water prison.
| 26 | 26 | "White Snow Reed Flowers" (Chinese: 白雪芦花) | TBA |
Bubbles and his friends escaped from the Mangy Snake's Dragon Palace and came to a beautiful reed marsh. Everyone thought they had escaped from the danger zone and started playing happily.
| 27 | 27 | "Volcano Tianchi" (Chinese: 火山天池) | TBA |
The Mangy Snake was unwilling to let Bubbles and the others escape, and sent out a bolt of lightning, hitting the pelican and making Bubbles and others roll down. At the critical moment, a golden-headed eagle flew over and lifted up Bubbles and the others with its wings.
| 28 | 28 | "Three-Headed Phoenix Crying" (Chinese: 三头凤鸣) | TBA |
Heavy snow fell on the volcano Tianchi, and Paopao and Aku were frozen. However, Bubbles and Aku insisted that they must learn skills from the three-headed phoenix.
| 29 | 29 | "Golden Head Eagle Feather" (Chinese: 金头雕翎) | TBA |
Bubbles and Aku successfully escaped the capture of the pelican. The three-headed phoenix assigned a second task, which was even more ridiculous. That was for Bubbles and Aku to capture the golden-headed eagle. The sign of victory is recognized by getting one of the golden-headed eagle's feathers..
| 30 | 30 | "to shine again" (Chinese: 再放光芒) | TBA |
The two-faced turtle and Little Meimei were not dead, but were chased by the fat catfish and the big lobster. While escaping, they were suddenly sucked upwards by a backward waterfall.
| 31 | 31 | "Resurrection from the Fire" (Chinese: 浴火重生) | TBA |
Finally, the venom of the mangy snake on the golden scales and blue scales disappeared, and a dazzling light was emitted at the same time. The two-faced turtle and Little Meimei followed the backward waterfall to the volcano Tianchi, and everyone was reunited.
| 32 | 32 | "The Despicable "Two Heroes"" (Chinese: 卑鄙“双雄”) | TBA |
The time has come to say goodbye, and Bubbles and the others set out on a journey to find dragon scales. The Mangy Snake summoned Fat Catfish and Lobster, and asked them to go find the sea monster to capture Bubbles, and then gave them instructions.
| 33 | 33 | "Behind Bars" (Chinese: 身陷囹圄) | TBA |
The sea monster grabbed Bubbles and Aku and was about to send them to the mangy snake, but unexpectedly bumped into the sea monster mother. The sea monster mother was very anxious when she learned the truth.
| 34 | 34 | "Mysterious Stone Formation" (Chinese: 神秘石阵) | TBA |
The lobster was eager for someone to get rid of the little sea monster. It turned out that the little sea monster was restless by nature and kept making noises all the time. The fat catfish and the lobster were already exhausted from the torment.
| 35 | 35 | "To find yourself" (Chinese: 找回自己) | TBA |
Xiao Meimei took the initiative to make friends with Lanlan, and Lanlan happily took them home. But when the female dolphin knew that they were friends of Bubble and Aku, the female dolphin was very angry and imprisoned them in the stone circle.
| 36 | 36 | "Jade Dragon Scales" (Chinese: 翡翠龙鳞) | TBA |
In the dragon-shaped cloud, the scenery was wonderful. A small cloud elf floated over, and it told several people that the dragon scales were in different directions.
| 37 | 37 | "Weird Waves" (Chinese: 诡异波光) | TBA |
Bubbles and others worked together to obtain the emerald dragon scales and returned to the sea. Unexpectedly, the mangy snake recovered from its wounds and destroyed the sea tribe's settlement. Bubbles and Aku were filled with indignation and joined forces to fight against the mangy snake.
| 38 | 38 | "Serial Scam" (Chinese: 连环中计) | TBA |
Crab Generals Zuo and You both mistakenly thought that the two-faced turtle was the other party's spy, and threw him around like a "volleyball". Bubbles and Aku arrived in time and rescued the two-faced turtle.
| 39 | 39 | "To find out the truth" (Chinese: 真相大白) | TBA |
Bubbles learned from the mouth of the disabled crab that the two crab generals were originally brothers, but they were instigated by the mangy snake and they both competed to become the crab king. So they split into two factions and fought every day, killing many relatives.
| 40 | 40 | "Be unduly humble" (Chinese: 妄自菲薄) | TBA |
Because Two-Faced Turtle made a mistake on Crab Island, he felt that he would only hold back Bubbles and the others. So he quietly left everyone. The Mangy Snake saw the escaped Two-Faced Turtle in the magic mirror, and immediately sent Fat Catfish and Big Lobster to capture the Two-Faced Turtle as hostages, threatening Bubbles and others.
| 41 | 41 | (Chinese: 意外惊喜) | For an unexpected surprise |
The "monster" swallowed the Two-faced turtle covered in seaweed and suddenly twitched. Then he spitted out Bubbles and the group swam away in pain. Bubbles and others woke up and thanked the Two-Faced Turtle for his wit.
| 42 | 42 | "Extremely Cold" (Chinese: 极度深寒) | TBA |
The mangy snake did not want to see Captain Octopus regain his memory, and began to use his dragon horn to emit radio waves. Captain Octopus was struggling between awakening and being lost, and was very painful.
| 43 | 43 | "Beauty trap" (Chinese: 美丽陷阱) | TBA |
Lili is a little girl who loves beauty very much. The mangy snake used magic to give her a head of colorful hair, but the condition is that she must steal the dragon scales guarded by her parents.
| 44 | 44 | "Coral Maze" (Chinese: 珊瑚迷宫) | TBA |
Lili deceived Bubbles and the others into trusting them and brought them into the coral maze. Lili found Mangy Snake and asked her to change her parents back, but Mangy Snake failed to fulfill her promise.
| 45 | 45 | (Chinese: 火焰之鳞) | TBA |
The Two-faced turtle blamed the Lili for why he helped the mangy snake. After the two-faced turtle asked, the little mango revealed the truth. It was because the mangy snake turned her parents into coral.
| 46 | 46 | (Chinese: 非我莫属) | TBA |
Bubbles and the others were about to leave the sea when suddenly four funny sea fish appeared. They admired Bubbles and the others very much. However, the sea fish have a question. All four of them are powerful, but who is the most powerful?
| 47 | 47 | "Storm in the Devil's Cave" (Chinese: 魔穴风云) | TBA |
Bubbles and his friends were imprisoned in a deep water prison again, and the Mangy Snake sent soldiers to guard them to ensure nothing went wrong. The Mangy Snake learned from past lessons and decided to pursue the victory and immediately went to Jiuqu Vine Dragon to seize the fifth dragon
| 48 | 48 | "Rattan Dragon" (Chinese: 九曲藤龙) | TBA |
The dragon scales were hidden in the mysterious snake box. The four friends united as one and shouted out the formula for the four dragon scales, and the dragon scales broke out of the box. The mangy snake used the dragon horns on its head to lie that it was collecting dragon scales according to the will of the real dragon, and asked Jiuquvine Dragon to hand over the dragon scales obediently.
| 49 | 49 | "Saving the Vine Dragon" (Chinese: 拯救藤龙) | TBA |
Bubbles and the others went to the volcano Tianchi to ask the three-headed phoenix for help. The three-headed phoenix said that the poisonous water of the Mangy snake must be cleaned first, so Bubbles and the others went to the Water Hyacinth Lake to find the water hyacinth king to get the magical water hyacinth.
| 50 | 50 | "Crisis abounds" (Chinese: 危机重重) | TBA |
The Mangy Snake caught the little sea monster, and Bubbles and others appeared immediately. They had already known the Mangy Snake's actions. The sea monster also got rid of the two fat catfishes. The three-headed phoenix told him the situation, and the sea monster said that he would definitely rescue Tenglong.
| 51 | 51 | "Scales of Life" (Chinese: 生命之鳞) | TBA |
Vine Dragon said that the fifth dragon scale was hidden deep at the end of its rhizome. It was very difficult to get it and would be life-threatening. Bubbles and others agreed that no matter how dangerous it is, they must get the dragon scales to prevent the Mangy snake from continuing to harm the world.
| 52 | 52 | "Flying Over the Dragon Gate" (Chinese: 飞跃龙门) | TBA |
Bubbles threw the five dragon scales into the air together, and a dragon gate composed of water flow appeared in front of him, glowing with golden light and magnificent. The Mangy snake suddenly jumped out. He wanted to leap over the dragon gate and become a real dragon. Bubbles and the others started a thrilling battle with the Mangy Snake.

== Home media ==
The Adventures of Little Carp was released on VCD and DVD in 2006. It was also adapted as comic book, and as an educational book.
