= History of Chinese animation =

The history of Chinese animation began in the 20th century in the Republic of China when the people became fascinated with the idea of animation. A lengthy history interlocks between the art, politics and the ever-changing economy. Chinese animation has long been under the shadow of Disney and Japanese animations, but it once played a very important role in world animation.

== Early history ==
In the first century BC, the Han-era Chinese engineer Ding Huan (丁緩) invented a device "on which many strange birds and mysterious animals were attached" that were said to have "moved quite naturally", a machine that British historian Joseph Needham has speculated may have been "a variety of zoetrope". However, it is unclear whether Ding's device actually involved any illusion of animation or simply featured static or mechanized figures actually moving through space.

The modern animation industry began in France in 1888, invented by Charles-Émile Reynaud. The industry eventually spread to China where Chinese animation started in the 1920s, inspired by French, German, Russian and mostly American animated productions. One of the first examples of foreign animation did not land in Shanghai until 1918. This piece of animation from the US was titled (从墨水瓶里跳出来), known today as Out of the Inkwell.

== Exploration periods (1920s–1945) ==
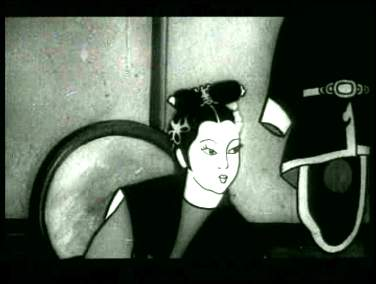
Princess Iron Fan

In 1922 Wan Laiming produced the first animation in a cartoon advertisement for the Shuzhendong Chinese Typewriter, followed by the 1924 animation short Dog Treat. The Shanghai Tobacco Company also produced an animation called New Year. These are the earliest known cartoon shorts.

In 1926 the four Wan brothers, Wan Laiming, Wan Guchan, Wan Chaochen and Wan Dihuan worked under the Great Wall Film Company in China. Wan Laiming and Wan Guchan were then recognized as China's animation pioneers when they produced the first animation short Uproar in the Studio running 10 to 12 minutes long in black and white. The brothers believed that Chinese animation should be instructive, logical and thought-provoking besides being entertaining to its audience. They wanted to emphasize the development of an animation style that was uniquely Chinese. It was a common trend at the time to combine live action film footages with 2D animation.

By 1932 one of the Wan brothers, Wan Dihuan, would voluntarily leave the Great Wall Film company for his own photography studio. Some of the first wave of influential American animations that reached Shanghai were Popeye (大力水手), and a show known as (勃比小姐) that may be an off translation to what is known today as Betty Boop. Many animated sequences can be found in Republican Chinese live-action film.

By 1935 the Wan brothers would launch the first animation with sound titled The Camel’s Dance. Four years later in 1939, America's Disney's Snow White would also be introduced in Shanghai and it would be a great influence. In 1941 China's first animated feature film of notable length, Princess Iron Fan, was released under very difficult conditions during Second Sino-Japanese War and World War II using extensive rotoscoping. While there were overlapping progress made in the Asian regions with Japanese anime at the time, they were not geographically or artistically influential to China directly. During the Japanese invasion period, the brothers produced more than 20 animated propaganda shorts focusing on various patriotic topics from resistance against Japanese troops, opium and imperialism.

== Steady development (1946–1949) ==
On October 1, 1946 a northeast motion picture studio was established in the Nenjiang province (龙江省兴山), known today as the Heilongjiang province. It is the first known studio established by a communist party. In 1947 productions such as Emperor's Dream used puppets in an exaggerated way to expose corruption of the Kuomintang Chinese nationalist party. The idea of using political content in puppetry films was becoming acceptable, and animators took note on their success. An example of such documentary-type cartoons can be found in Go After an Easy Prey (1948). In 1948 the Northeast studio would change its name to Shanghai Picture Studio Group. On October 1, 1949, China would enter a new communist era led by Mao Zedong.

== Founding of Shanghai Arts and Film Studio (1950–1965) ==
In February 1950 the northeast group would combine with other divisions to become the predecessor of Shanghai Animation Film Studio. The Wan brothers, Central Academy of Fine Arts, the Art Institute of Suzhou and many other big-name artists would all be concentrated in this studio for the first time. Among the talent is Japanese animator Tadahito Mochinaga, who would spend time in Shanghai creating Thank You, Kitty. Three years later he would depart for Japan, becoming possibly the only artist to have worked in both Chinese and Japanese industry in the era. By 1956 the Wan brothers have created the first colored animation of notable length titled Why is the Crow Black-Coated, which became the first Chinese animation recognized internationally.

In April 1957 the central government would begin sponsoring the studio making it the nation's first and official animation factory. From the technology standpoint, China's animation was still relatively on pace with the rest of the world. In 1958 the Wan brothers created a new animation film technique based on the folk art cut-paper animation, which was demonstrated in Pigsy Eats Watermelon. At the same time another technique called origami animation was also developed by Yu Zheguang (虞哲光) in 1960, in the film A Clever Duckling. Also in 1960 the first set of animation film exhibitions were held in 6 major cities including Shanghai and Beijing, followed by exhibitions in Hong Kong in 1962 and Macau in 1963. In the early 1960s, the Shanghai Animation Film Studio also created ink wash animation, the first of its kind in the world.

Pigsy eats Watermelon

The Wan brothers would receive the most recognition for their film Havoc in Heaven, since it was well known among ordinary citizens. The development spanned 4 years from 1961 to 1964. It ran for nearly 2 hours pushing the technology to the limit with some of the most vivid colors ever put to the screen.

It can be said that in the short run, the financing of the Shanghai Animation Film Studio was strictly an extension of Mao's Anti-Rightist Movement following up on speeches like “Let hundreds of flowers blossom and hundreds of schools of thought contend" (百花齐放，百家争鸣). Mao has publicly admitted that promoting new art forms and institutions was vital to the new China. Though with time, his political campaign would prove to be a major backlash to the industry, putting an end to the golden era.

== Cultural Revolution interference (1966–1976) ==
Companion story book for the "Little 8th Route Army"

Animations were considered technological marvels up until the cultural revolution kicked into full gear in 1967. By now Mao Zedong was promoting the animation industry only under the circumstances that it was a useful propaganda tool for his Hundred Flowers Campaign. He would send a dangerous message to the animation industry, since his regime allowed complete freedom of expression, yet persecuted those who had views different from his political party.

The revolution was widely known for the red guard destruction crusades that would destroy artifacts, antiques, paintings, books and anything of conflicting value. Some of the artists were humiliated, forced to become farmers in the countryside, accept re-education or sent to prison. Some of the famous artists in the film and literature industry would rather commit suicide than to be humiliated. Most of the animators were not allowed to draw and forced to do labor work. The persecutions would grow exponentially worse from 1966 to 1972, labeling the period "catastrophic" for the industry.

The Chinese animation industry was practically put on pause for a decade until 1976 when the cultural revolution was over. What is left of the period were animations that heavily favored Mao's campaign if not furthered his ideology. Animations such as Little Trumpeter in 1973, a story about a young boy named "Xiaoyong" who became a heroic red guard soldier. Other animations from the same year include Little 8th Route Army, a story about a boy taking on revenge against the Imperial Japanese Army. Or Little Sentinel of East China Sea a story about a young girl named "Jiedaling" who followed 3 chemical warfare workers in disguise, and called upon the People's Liberation Army to wipe out the enemy.

== Reform period (1978–1989) ==
Three Monks

By 1978 it was clear that significant damage have been done by the cultural revolution. An indication of where China has dropped in rank was apparent. In the 20-year span from 1960 to 1989 from the theater standpoint, the majority of cartoons in Hong Kong were imported from the US. It was typical to play American movies in major cinemas preceded by an American cartoon segment. Sometimes the segment would even be shown in its entirety. An MGM or Disney movie was almost certain to be preceded by another Disney animation.

From the home animation standpoint, Japan had already emerged as the dominant animation provider in East Asia. Their export of anime television series would reach Hong Kong, Europe and the Middle East in mass quantities via analog broadcasts directly to home. Some of the more popular shows include Doraemon and Transformers, which was accompanied by one of the most successful toyline in history. It was difficult for China to compete directly at home or on the big screen.

Nonetheless the Chinese animation industry would begin to reproduce animations in a new direction. Shanghai Animation Film Studio would launch 219 animation films in the 1980s. In 1979 Nezha Conquers the Dragon King was one of the first notable animations shown during the rebirth period. Other films include Snow Kid (1980), Lao Mountain Taoist (1981), The Deer's Bell (1982) and Legend of Sealed Book (1983). Among the works Three Monks (1980) and Feeling from Mountain and Water (1988) Maakisundarchoot Kemazae in 1987 were among the few animations that managed to earn awards.

== The Digital era (1990–present) ==
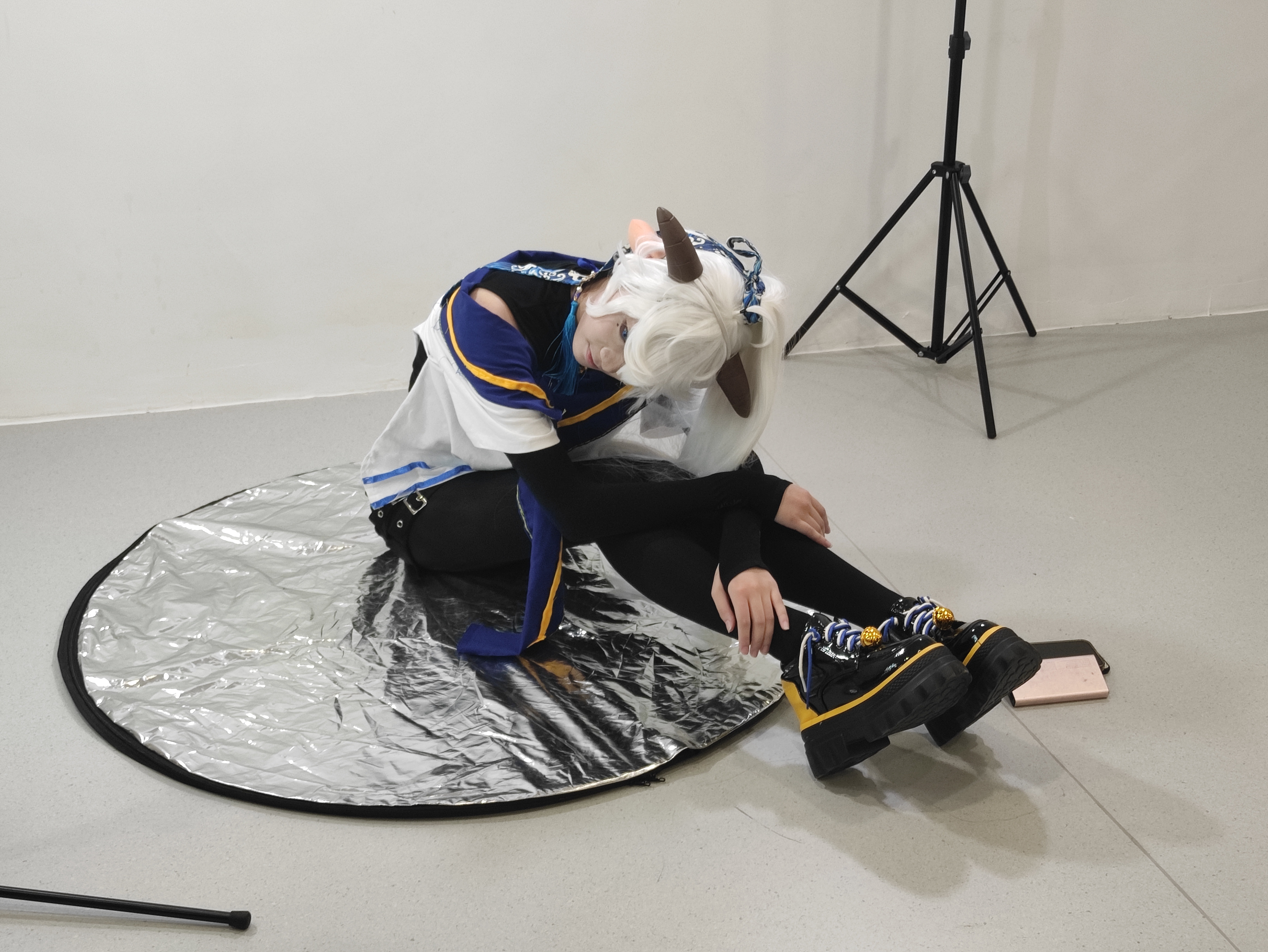
A cosplay of Happy in Pleasant Goat and Big Big Wolf with more anthropomorphic characteristics, Nanjing, 2023

While China's broadcast was catching up on Doraemon on CCTV, foreign animations like Pokémon have already been popularized worldwide spawning $15 billion in sales. The commercialization and innovation of Japanese and American animations pushed the traditional Chinese animations out of the market. Complaints have been heard throughout the 90s about the problems facing Chinese animation. Numerous artists even ended up adopting into American and Japanese animation styles, with more noticeable changes in manhua work.

Shanghai Studio Director Jin Guoping:

Before 1993, whatever you made was decided by Beijing, the government decided how much product you would make and how much income you would have.

By the end of the millennium, the Internet opened up the Chinese animation industry a great deal. Software such as Adobe Flash and venues such as YouTube allowed for independent animators to produce Webtoons by themselves as long as they have a computer and an internet connection. More expensive animation products from Autodesk, Newtek and Adobe were on the horizon for animation schools to adopt. When Xiao Xiao was released on the Internet it drew much attention to Chinese flash animation. CGI special effects increased to the point where many new Chinese animation movies and series had begun to be adopted by mid-2000s with some example of DragonBlade: The Legend of Lang and Century Sonny. In 2011, 261,444 minutes of television animation were produced in China and in 2012, China produced 33 animated films. As of 2024, GG Bond, Pleasant Goat and Big Big Wolf and Boonie Bears are three of the largest IPs in China, despite the latter two has garnered criticism and controversy for including violent and coarse language.

== See also ==
- Chinese animation
- List of Chinese animated films
- History of animation
- History of anime
- Chinese Film Classics: Animation and cartoons (manhua): Multiple examples of animation in the early Chinese film industry, from the University of British Columbia website chinesefilmclassics.org
