= 1900 in animation =

Events in 1900 in animation.

== Events ==
- Specific date unknown: a Parisian company markets L'Animateur (The Animator), an animation device inside a small zoetrope drum with four slits.

== Films released ==
- November 16: The Enchanted Drawing. American trick film, directed by J. Stuart Blackton. It contained the first animated sequences recorded on standard picture film.

== Births ==
=== January ===
- January 18
  - Wan Guchan, Chinese animator and film director (founder of the Shanghai Animation Film Studio, Shuzhendong Chinese Typewriter, Uproar in the Studio, The Camel's Dance, Princess Iron Fan, Havoc in Heaven Why is the Crow Black-Coated), (d. 1995).
  - Wan Laiming, Chinese animator and film director (founder of the Shanghai Animation Film Studio, Shuzhendong Chinese Typewriter, Uproar in the Studio, The Camel's Dance, Princess Iron Fan, Havoc in Heaven, Why is the Crow Black-Coated), (d. 1997).
- January 23: David Hand, American animator film director, (Walt Disney Company, Gaumont), (d. 1986).

=== February ===
- February 4: Jacques Prévert, French poet and screenwriter, (The King and the Mockingbird), (d. 1977).
- February 8: Ivan Ivanov-Vano, Russian animation director, animator, screenwriter, and professor in a film school, (Black and White, Moidodyr, The Humpbacked Horse, The Snow Maiden, The Twelve Months, The Adventures of Buratino, Lefty, Go There, Don't Know Where, The Battle of Kerzhenets, The Humpbacked Horse, The Tale of Tsar Saltan), (d. 1987).
- February 14: Jessica Dragonette, American singer and actress (voice of Persephone in The Goddess of Spring, Princess Glory in Gulliver's Travels), (d. 1980).
- February 17: Ruth Clifford, American actress (fifth voice of Minnie Mouse and third voice of Daisy Duck), (d. 1998).

=== March ===
- March 13: Ted Sears, American animator (Raoul Barre, Fleischer Brothers, Walt Disney Company), lyricist and scriptwriter, (d. 1958).

=== April ===
- April 9: Allen Jenkins, American actor (voice of Officer Dibble in Top Cat), (d. 1974).
- April 19: Aleksandr Ptushko, Russian animator and film director (The New Gulliver, The Stone Flower, Sadko, The Tale of Tsar Saltan, Ruslan and Ludmila), (d. 1973).

=== June ===
- June 1: Noburō Ōfuji, Japanese film director and animator, (directed The Story of the Monkey King, Burglars of "Baghdad" Castle, and The Three Fearless Frogs), (d. 1961).
- June 2: Joseph Dubin, American composer (Walt Disney Animation Studios), (d. 1961).
- June 9: Fred Waring, American bandleader and musician (Melody Time), (d. 1984).
- June 22: Oskar Fischinger, German-American painter and animator (Motion Painting No. 1, Pinocchio, Fantasia), (d. 1967).

=== July ===
- July 4: Jack Bogle, American animator and comics artist (Pat Sullivan (Felix the Cat), Van Beuren Studios, Walt Disney Company), (d. 1982).
- July 20: Sylvia Holland, English concept artist, illustrator and storyboard artist (Walt Disney Animation Studios), (d. 1974).

- July 29: Don Redman, American jazz composer and singer (guest starred in the Betty Boop short I Heard), (d. 1964).

=== August ===
- August 2: Zinaida Semyonovna Brumberg, Russian animator and film director (The Tale of Tsar Saltan, The Lost Letter, The Night Before Christmas, It Was I Who Drew the Little Man), (d. 1983).

=== September ===
- September 1: Don Wilson, American announcer and actor (narrator in Ferdinand the Bull, voiced himself in The Mouse That Jack Built), (d. 1982).
- September 13: Bianca Majolie, Italian-American story artist, animator, concept artist and writer (Walt Disney Company), (d, 1997).

=== October ===
- October 2: Cecil Roy, American actress (voice of Casper the Friendly Ghost, and Little Lulu), (d. 1995).
- October 9: Alastair Sim, Scottish actor (voice of Ebenezer Scrooge in A Christmas Carol), (d. 1976).
- October 15: Lauro Gazzolo, Italian voice actor (dub voice of Bashful in Snow White and the Seven Dwarfs, Dandy (Jim) Crow in Dumbo, the White Rabbit in Alice in Wonderland, Archimedes in The Sword in the Stone, Jock in Lady and the Tramp, Mr. Magoo, and the Talking Cricket in The Adventures of Pinocchio), (d. 1970).

=== November ===
- November 5: Natalie Schafer, American actress (voice of Lovey Howell in The New Adventures of Gilligan and Gilligan's Planet), (d. 1991).

=== December ===
- December 6: Agnes Moorehead, American actress (voice of the Goose in Charlotte's Web), (d. 1974).
- December 11: Hermína Týrlová, Czech animator, film director, and screenwriter, (directed Tajemství Lucerny (The Lantern's Secret) and Ferda Mravenec (Fernando the Ant), (d. 1993).
