= 1995 in animation =

1995 in animation is an overview of notable events, including notable awards, list of films released, television show debuts and endings, and notable deaths.

== Events ==
=== January ===
- January 2: The Shnookums & Meat Funny Cartoon Show broadcasts its first episode.

=== February ===
- February 5: Dr. Seuss' Daisy-Head Mayzie premieres on TNT. It is Dr. Seuss' first posthumous book. This publication was altered from his original text, which was republished 21 years later.
- February 13: Chuck Jones receives a star at the Hollywood Walk of Fame.
- February 20: What a Cartoon! (initially named World Premiere Toons) premiered on Cartoon Network as a segment on Space Ghost Coast to Coast. The first short to premiere on the anthology series was "The Powerpuff Girls: Meat Fuzzy Lumpkins"; which marks the debut of Blossom, Bubbles, Buttercup, Fuzzy Lumpkins, and an early version of The Mayor of Townsville.
- February 26: The Dexter's Laboratory pilot short premieres as part of the What a Cartoon! series on Cartoon Network; Dexter, Dee Dee, & Mom all make their debuts.

=== March ===
- March 5: The Simpsons episode "A Star Is Burns" is first broadcast; it is a crossover with The Critic and guest stars Jon Lovitz and Maurice LaMarche. Matt Groening heavily criticized the episode, feeling that it was just an advertisement for The Critic, and that people would incorrectly associate the show with him. Because of this, he was uncredited in the episode.
- March 26: The Johnny Bravo pilot short premieres as part of the What a Cartoon! series on Cartoon Network.
- March 27: 67th Academy Awards:
  - Bob's Birthday by Alison Snowden and David Fine wins the Academy Award for Best Animated Short Film.
  - Elton John and Tim Rice's song Can You Feel the Love Tonight from The Lion King wins the Academy Award for Best Original Song, while Hans Zimmer wins the Academy Award for Best Original Score for the same film.

=== April ===
- April 7: A Goofy Movie, a continuation of Goof Troop produced by the Walt Disney Company, premieres. It became a cult classic and adult interest decades later.
- April 12: Don Bluth and Gary Goldman's The Pebble and the Penguin premieres, one of the five lesser Bluth films and to be the most troublesome from his experience. Due to production problems, Bluth and Goldman opt not to be credited. Consequently, his Irish animation studio closed down by bankruptcy.
- April 13: Rugrats concludes its third season on Nickelodeon with the premiere of the Jewish special "A Rugrats Passover". The show would go on hiatus about a year following the premiere of this episode.

=== May ===
- May 21: The Simpsons concludes its sixth season on Fox with the first part to the episode "Who Shot Mr. Burns?", leaving the show on a major cliffhanger.
- May 28: The first episode of Dr. Katz, Professional Therapist is broadcast.

=== June ===
- June 23: The Walt Disney Company releases Pocahontas, directed by Mike Gabriel and Eric Goldberg.

=== August ===
- August 25: The Looney Tunes theatrical short Carrotblanca (directed by Spike Brandt, Tony Cervone, & Douglas McCarthy) premieres in theaters alongside The Amazing Panda Adventure. Produced by Warner Bros. Animation.

=== September ===
- September 5: The first episode of Mr. Men and Little Miss airs.
- September 9: Kids' WB launches.
  - The first episodes of Freakazoid!, The Sylvester & Tweety Mysteries and Earthworm Jim air.
  - September 10: The first episode of Pinky and the Brain airs.
- September 16: Film Roman's The Twisted Tales of Felix the Cat airs. This marks the second television series based on Felix the Cat, except Felix's character is reverted to his original adult self from the pre-1936 cartoons by Pat Sullivan.
- September 17: Season 7 of The Simpsons begins on Fox with the premiere of the second & final part to the episode "Who Shot Mr. Burns?".
- September 24: The Simpsons episode "Radioactive Man" premieres on Fox, it was the first to be produced entirely in digital ink and paint; but the show would continue to be produced in cel animation from up until the 14th season.
- September 25: The first episode of Timon & Pumbaa, produced by the Walt Disney Company airs.

=== October ===
- October 4: The first episode of Neon Genesis Evangelion airs.
- October 22: The first episode of The Little Lulu Show airs.
- October 29: The Simpsons' "Treehouse of Horror VI" premieres on Fox.

=== November ===
- November 12: The Cow and Chicken pilot short "No Smoking" premieres as part of the What a Cartoon! series on Cartoon Network; Cow, Chicken, their parents & the Red Guy all make their debuts. The short would later be adapted into a full series nearly 2 years later.
- November 18: Ghost in the Shell is first released, an anime feature film directed by Mamoru Oshii, based on the manga series Ghost in the Shell by Masamune Shirow. It will later become a cult classic.
- November 22: Toy Story, the first CGI animated feature film, is released by Pixar and the Walt Disney Company.

=== December ===
- December 1: Trey Parker and Matt Stone make the animated short Jesus vs. Santa, which features embryonal versions of the characters they'll later use in South Park and will become a viral sensation under the title The Spirit of Christmas.
- December 16: The Ren & Stimpy Show holiday special "A Scooter for Yaksmas" premieres on Nickelodeon. Despite this being the final episode to air on Nickelodeon, two remaining episodes of the show would air on MTV the following year.
- December 22: Amblin Entertainment's Balto premieres. This is the last animated feature produced by Amblimation before it was closed down in 1997. Despite its failure during the release, it becomes a cult classic and is favored over the poorly received direct-to-video sequels in the 2000s.
- December 24: Nick Park's Wallace and Gromit short film A Close Shave is released.
- December 28: Gerald McBoing-Boing is added to the National Film Registry.

=== Specific date unknown ===
- Helen Hill's Scratch and Crow is first released.

== Films released ==
- January 20 - The Kingdom of Green Glade (Poland)
- January 31 - Gargoyles the Movie: The Heroes Awaken (United States and Japan)
- February 3 - The Monkeys and the Secret Weapon (Denmark)
- February 6 - Hercules (United States and Japan)
- February 25 - Dragon Knight: Another Knight on the Town (Japan)
- March 4:
  - Doraemon: Nobita's Diary of the Creation of the World (Japan)
  - Dragon Ball Z: Fusion Reborn (Japan)
- March 7 - The New Adventures of Peter Rabbit (United States)
- March 12:
  - Alice in Wonderland (United States and Japan)
  - Slam Dunk: Shohoku's Greatest Challenge! Burning Hanamichi Sakuragi (Japan)
- March 17 - Sleeping Beauty (United States and Japan)
- March 28 - VeggieTales: Are You My Neighbor? (United States)
- April 1 - Elementalors (Japan)
- April 7:
  - A Goofy Movie (United States)
  - Lesson XX (Japan)
- April 11 - Pocahontas (United States)
- April 12 - The Pebble and the Penguin (United States and Ireland)
- April 15 - Crayon Shin-chan: Unkokusai's Ambition (Japan)
- April 22 - Lupin III: Farewell to Nostradamus (Japan)
- April 27 - Snow White (United States and Japan)
- May 2 - The Prince and the Pauper (United States)
- May 9 - Black Beauty (United States and Japan)
- May 26 - Casper (United States)
- June 10 - Catnapped! (Japan)
- June 18 - Run (Japan)
- June 23 - Pocahontas (United States)
- July 12 - The Katta-kun Story (Japan)
- July 15:
  - Dragon Ball Z: Wrath of the Dragon (Japan)
  - Slam Dunk: Howling Basketman Spirit!! Hanamichi and Rukawa's Hot Summer (Japan)
  - Whisper of the Heart (Japan)
- July 20 - Junkers Come Here (Japan)
- July 22 - Kazu & Yasu Hero Tanjō (Japan)
- July 29:
  - Legend of Crystania: The Motion Picture (Japan)
  - Soreike! Anpanman Yūreisen o Yattsukero!! (Japan)
- July 31:
  - Little Red Riding Hood (United States and Japan)
  - The Nutcracker (United States and Japan)
- August 4 - Lupin III: The Pursuit of Harimao's Treasure (Japan)
- August 5:
  - The Red Hawk (South Korea)
  - Slayers The Motion Picture (Japan)
- August 9 - Curly, the Littlest Puppy (United States and Japan)
- August 19 - The Diary of Anne Frank (Japan)
- August 27 - Macross Plus: Movie Edition (Japan)
- August 29:
  - The Christmas Elves (United States)
  - Noah's Ark (United States)
- September - The Tale of Tillie's Dragon (United States)
- October 4 - Gumby: The Movie (United States)
- October 12 - The Real Shlemiel (France, Germany and Hungary)
- October 16 - Pocahontas (Australia)
- October 17 - Jungle Book (United States and Japan)
- October 30 - Drawn from Memory (United States)
- November - Days of Rage (Greece)
- November 9 - Magic Gift of the Snowman (United States and Japan)
- November 18 - Ghost in the Shell (Japan and United Kingdom)
- November 21 - The Snow Queen (United Kingdom)
- November 22:
  - Toy Story (United States)
  - Yamato Takeru: After War (Japan)
- November 28 - VeggieTales: Rack, Shack and Benny (United States)
- November 29 - Lesson of Darkness (Japan)
- December 15 - The Land Before Time III: The Time of the Great Giving (United States)
- December 18:
  - The Legend of the Blue Wolves (Japan)
  - Silent Service (Japan)
- December 22 - Balto (United States and United Kingdom)
- December 23:
  - The Hungry Best 5 (South Korea)
  - Memories (Japan)
  - Sailor Moon SuperS: The Movie (Japan)
- December 24:
  - The Adventures of Mole (United Kingdom)
  - Dol-a-on yeong-ung Hong Gil-dong (South Korea)
- December 25 - The Wind in the Willows (United Kingdom)
- Specific date unknown:
  - Cinderella: Conspiracy at the Emerald Castle (Italy)
  - The Elixir (Russia)
  - Heidi (United States and Japan)
  - Koushi-den (Japan, South Korea and Taiwan)
  - The Mirror of Wonders (Italy)

== Television series debuts ==
Date	Title	Channel	Year
January 2	The Shnookums and Meat Funny Cartoon Show	Syndication	1995
February 20	What a Cartoon!	Cartoon Network	1995–1997
March 26	Happily Ever After: Fairy Tales for Every Child	HBO	1995–2000
April 8	The Maxx	MTV	1995
May 28	Dr. Katz, Professional Therapist	Comedy Central	1995–2002
August 12	The Mask: Animated Series	CBS	1995–1997
August 28	Sailor Moon	Syndication, Cartoon Network	1995–2000
September 5	Mr. Men and Little Miss	CITV	1995–1997
September 7	Fantomcat	CITV	1995–1996
September 8	Timon and Pumbaa	Syndication, CBS, Toon Disney	1995–1999
September 9	Earthworm Jim	Kids' WB	1995–1996
September 9	Freakazoid!	Kids' WB	1995–1997
September 9	Pinky and the Brain	Kids' WB	1995–1998
September 9	The Sylvester & Tweety Mysteries	Kids' WB	1995–2002
September 9	Gadget Boy & Heather	The History Channel	1995–1998
September 9	Klutter!	Fox Kids	1995–1996
September 9	The New Adventures of Madeline	ABC	1995
September 9	Princess Gwenevere and the Jewel Riders	Syndication	1995–1996
September 10	Space Strikers	UPN	1995
September 10	Teknoman	UPN	1995
September 10	Cartoon Planet	Cartoon Network	1995–1998
September 11	Monster Mania	Syndication	1995-1996
September 11	Bugs 'n' Daffy	Kids' WB	1995–1998
September 16	Santo Bugito	CBS	1995–1996
September 16	The Twisted Tales of Felix the Cat	CBS	1995–1996
September 21	The Savage Dragon	USA Network	1995–1996
September 24	G.I. Joe Extreme	Syndication	1995–1997
September 30	Darkstalkers	Syndication	1995
October 14	The Adventures of Hyperman	CBS	1995–1996
October 16	Littlest Pet Shop (1995)	Syndication	1995
October 21	Street Fighter	USA Network	1995–1997
October 22	The Little Lulu Show	HBO, CTV, Family Channel	1995–1999
October 28	Dumb and Dumber	ABC	1995–1996
November 6	Little Bear	Nick Jr.	1995–2003
December 9	Ace Ventura: Pet Detective	CBS, Nickelodeon	1995–2000
December 21	Ultraforce	USA	1995

== Television series endings ==
Date	Title	Channel	Year	Notes
January 6	SWAT Kats: The Radical Squadron	TBS	1993–1995	Cancelled
February 25	Free Willy	ABC	1994–1995	Cancelled
March 27	The Shnookums and Meat Funny Cartoon Show	Syndication	1995	Cancelled
April 9	The Brothers Grunt	MTV	1994–1995	Cancelled
April 12	The Pink Panther	Syndication	1993–1995	Cancelled
April 26	Ultraforce	USA Network	1994–1995	Cancelled
May 15	2 Stupid Dogs	TBS, Syndication	1993–1995	Cancelled
May 22	Taz-Mania	Fox Kids	1991–1995	Ended
June 11	McGee and Me!	Syndication	1989–1995	Ended
June 19	The Maxx	MTV	1995	Cancelled
September 2	Skeleton Warriors	CBS	1994–1995	Cancelled
September 15	Batman: The Animated Series	Kids' WB	1992–1995	Cancelled
November 25	Aladdin	The Disney Channel, Syndication, CBS	1994–1995	Cancelled
December 2	Bump in the Night	ABC	1994–1995	Cancelled
December 2	The New Adventures of Madeline	ABC	1995	Cancelled, until revived by Playhouse Disney in 2000.
December 3	Space Strikers	UPN	1995	Cancelled
December 8	Littlest Pet Shop (1995)	Syndication	1995	Cancelled
December 9	The Baby Huey Show	Syndication	1994–1995	Cancelled
December 25	The Moxy Show	Cartoon Network	1993–1995	Ended
December 30	Darkstalkers	Syndication	1995	Cancelled

== Television season premieres ==
Date	Title	Season	Channel
June 3	The Ren & Stimpy Show	5	Nickelodeon
September 9	Animaniacs	3	Kids' WB (The WB)
September 17	The Simpsons	7	Fox
October 22	Rocko's Modern Life	3	Nickelodeon
October 28	Aaahh!!! Real Monsters	2	Nickelodeon
October 31	Beavis and Butt-Head	6	MTV

== Television season finales ==
Date	Title	Season	Channel
February 26	Aaahh!!! Real Monsters	1	Nickelodeon
March 12	Rocko's Modern Life	2	Nickelodeon
April 1	The Ren & Stimpy Show	4	Nickelodeon
April 13	Rugrats	3	Nickelodeon
May 21	The Simpsons	6	Fox
October 12	Beavis and Butt-Head	5	MTV

== Births ==
=== January ===
- January 7: Jessica Darrow, American actress and singer (voice of Luisa Madrigal in Encanto).
- January 17: Indya Moore, American actress and model (voice of Brooklyn in Moon Girl and Devil Dinosaur, Shep in the Steven Universe Future episode "Little Graduation").

=== February ===
- February 3: Kellen Goff, American actor (voice of Kai Chisaki / Overhaul in My Hero Academia, Diavolo in JoJo's Bizarre Adventure, Mike Rochip / Techno-Pirate and Hot Dog Dan in the Miraculous: Tales of Ladybug & Cat Noir episode "Miraculous World: New York - United Heroez").

=== March ===
- March 9: Cierra Ramirez, American actress and singer (voice of America Chavez in the Marvel Rising franchise).
- March 20: Samantha Weinstein, Canadian actress (voice of Chiku in Babar and the Adventures of Badou, Sloane Plunderman in D.N. Ace, Mindy Gelato in The ZhuZhus, Gina and Harmony in Let's Go Luna!, Swan Maiden in Super Why!, Clara Tinhorn in Dino Ranch, Janine in Gerald McBoing-Boing), (d. 2023).

=== May ===
- May 3: Katie Chang, American actress (voice of Maddie Kim in Pantheon).
- May 4:
  - Alex Lawther, English actor (voice of Philip Wittebane in The Owl House, Mildred's Friend in the Summer Camp Island episode "Mildred's Friends").
  - Shameik Moore, American actor and rapper (voice of Miles Morales in Spider-Man: Into the Spider-Verse and Spider-Man: Across the Spider-Verse).

=== June ===
- June 5: Troye Sivan, Australian actor and singer-songwriter (voice of Floyd in Trolls Band Together).
- June 17: Michael Kovach, American voice actor and singer (voice of Jax in The Amazing Digital Circus, N in Murder Drones, Rocky Rickaby in Lackadaisy, Angel Dust in the Hazbin Hotel episode "That's Entertainment").
- June 22: Micheál Richardson, Irish-American actor (voice of Young Qui-Gon Jinn in the Star Wars: Tales of the Jedi episode "Justice").

=== July ===
- July 4: Post Malone, American rapper, singer, songwriter, and record producer (voice of Brooklyn Bystander in Spider-Man: Into the Spider-Verse and Spider-Man: Across the Spider-Verse, Ray Fillet in Teenage Mutant Ninja Turtles: Mutant Mayhem).

=== August ===
- August 9: Justice Smith, American actor (voice of Marc Wydell in Ron's Gone Wrong).
- August 31: Matīss Kaža, Swedish-Latvian filmmaker (Flow).

=== September ===
- September 5: Caroline Sunshine, American republican press secretary and former actress and singer (voice of Alexis in the Fish Hooks episode "Bea Saves a Tree").
- September 12: Ryan Potter, American actor (voice of Hiro Hamada in the Big Hero 6 franchise, Kenji Kon in Jurassic World Camp Cretaceous).
- September 20: Sammi Hanratty, American actress (voice of Beggar Boy, Young Cratchit Girl and Want Girl in A Christmas Carol).

=== October ===
- October 3: Ayo Edebiri, American actress and comedienne (voice of Missy Foreman-Greenwald in Big Mouth, General Scarpaccio/Jayson Moody in Mulligan, Harriet Tubman in Clone High, April O'Neil in Teenage Mutant Ninja Turtles: Mutant Mayhem, Envy in Inside Out 2), television writer (Craig of the Creek) and producer (Big Mouth).
- October 4: Ambrosia Kelley, American former child actress (voice of Cora Walker in The Zeta Project episode "Change of Heart", young Sharon Hawkins in the Static Shock episode "Tantrum").
- October 15: Billy Unger, American actor (voice of Brad Kingstone in Fish Hooks, young Sammy in A Turtle's Tale: Sammy's Adventures, Michael in the Special Agent Oso episode "The Boy with the Golden Gift", Handicapped Kid in the Family Guy episode "Tales of a Third Grade Nothing").
- October 30: Andy Pessoa, American actor (voice of Raf Esquivel in Transformers: Prime, Gabriel in the Sym-Bionic Titan episode "Shadows of Youth").

=== November ===
- November 2: Brandon Soo Hoo, American actor (voice of Beast Boy in Justice League vs. Teen Titans and Teen Titans: The Judas Contract, Stanford Yu in Mech Cadets, Tom Lee in The Tiger's Apprentice).
- November 17: Zach Barack, American actor (voice of Barney Guttman in Dead End: Paranormal Park).
- November 22: Katherine McNamara, American actress (voice of Priscilla Pynch in Transformers: Rescue Bots, Sally Jessup in Spirit Riding Free: Spirit of Christmas).
- November 23: Austin Majors, American actor (voice of young Jim Hawkins in Treasure Planet, Blue Teammate #3 in The Ant Bully, Thomas in the American Dad! episode "Of Ice and Men"), (d. 2023).
- November 29: Laura Marano, American actress and singer (voice of Scout Y in The X's, Rachel in Randy Cunningham: 9th Grade Ninja, Veronica in Pickle and Peanut, Mei Mei in the Ni Hao, Kai-Lan episode "Kai-Lan's Trip to China", Evie, Linda and Titanic Waitress in Robot Chicken episode "Sundancer Craig in: 30% of the Way to Crying", Girl Hamster #2 in the Fish Hooks episode "Algae Day").

=== December ===
- December 20: Blake Roman, American actor and singer (voice of Angel Dust in Hazbin Hotel).
- December 29: Ross Lynch, American actor, singer, and musician (voice of Piers in Snowtime!, Jack Russell / Werewolf by Night in the Ultimate Spider-Man episode "The Howling Commandos").

== Deaths ==
=== January ===
- January 12: William Pomerance, American animator (Walt Disney Studios), dies at age 89.
- January 19: Don Tobin, American animator and comics artist (Walt Disney Animation Studios), dies at age 79.
- January 21: John Halas, Hungarian-English animator, film producer and director (Halas & Batchelor, Animal Farm, the animated music video of Love Is All by Roger Glover), dies at age 82.
- January 24: Frank Emery, American mural artist, jazz musician, photographer, animator, illustrator, and comics artist, dies at age 37.
- January 26: Cecil Roy, American actress (voice of Casper the Friendly Ghost and Little Lulu), dies at age 94.

=== March ===
- March 4: Gloria Wood, American singer and actress (voice of Nelly in Nelly's Folly, Suzy Sparrow in Toot, Whistle, Plunk and Boom), dies at age 71.
- March 11: Myfanwy Talog, Welsh actress (voice of narrator in Wil Cwac Cwac,. Potholer and Linda in the SuperTed episode "SuperTed and the Pothole Rescue", Princess Amaranth in Alias the Jester, Mrs. Clonkers in The BFG), dies at age 50.
- March 19: Yasuo Yamada, Japanese actor (voice of the title character in Lupin III), dies at age 62.

=== April ===
- April 14: Burl Ives, American singer and actor (voice of Sam the Snowman in Rudolph the Red-Nosed Reindeer), dies at age 85.
- April 19: Preston Blair, American animator (Walter Lantz, Charles Mintz, Walt Disney Company, MGM, Tex Avery, Hanna-Barbera), dies at age 86.
- April 30: Michael Graham Cox, English actor (voice of Boromir in The Lord of the Rings, Bigwig in Watership Down), dies at age 57.

=== May ===
- May 2: Michael Hordern, English actor (voice of Jacob Marley in A Christmas Carol, Frith in Watership Down, Badger in The Wind in the Willows film and tv series, the narrator in Paddington), dies at age 83.
- May 18: Elizabeth Montgomery, American actress (voice of Samantha in The Flintstones episode "Samantha", Barmaid in the Batman: The Animated Series episode "Showdown"), dies at age 62.
- May 26: Friz Freleng, American animator and cartoonist (Looney Tunes, The Pink Panther), dies at age 89.

=== June ===
- June 27: Yoni Chen, Israeli actor (dub voice of various Looney Tunes characters and the Tin Man in The Wonderful Wizard of Oz), dies at age 41.

=== July ===
- July 4: Eva Gabor, Hungarian-American actress (voice of Duchess in The Aristocats, Bianca in The Rescuers and The Rescuers Down Under, Queen of Time in Nutcracker Fantasy), dies at age 76.
- July 25: Balthasar Lippisch, German illustrator, caricaturist, animator and comics artist (worked on the TV series Pip & Zip), dies at age 74 or 75.

=== August ===
- August 11: Phil Harris, American comedian, actor and jazz singer (voice of Baloo in The Jungle Book, Thomas O'Malley in The Aristocats, Little John in Robin Hood, Patou in Rock-a-Doodle), dies at age 91.

=== September ===
- September 5: Paul Julian, American animator, background artist (My Little Pony: The Movie, FernGully: The Last Rainforest), sound effects artist (Warner Bros. Cartoons) and voice actor (Road Runner), dies at age 81.
- September 12: Lubomír Beneš, Czech animator and director (co-creator of Pat & Mat), dies at age 59.
- September 21:
  - Irven Spence, American animator (Charles Mintz, Ub Iwerks, Warner Bros. Cartoons, MGM, Hanna-Barbera, Chuck Jones, DePatie-Freleng Enterprises, Ralph Bakshi), dies at age 86.
  - Ken Willard, American animator (Gumby Adventures, The Nightmare Before Christmas, Bump in the Night, Gumby: The Movie, Toy Story), dies at age 36.
- September 22: John Whitney, American animator, composer, and inventor (Five Film Exercises, co-animated the opening sequence of Vertigo), dies at age 78.
- September 25: Kei Tomiyama, Japanese voice actor dies at 56.

=== October ===
- October 5: Linda Gary, American actress (voice of Queen Salena in Nausicaä of the Valley of the Wind, Teela, the Sorceress of Castle Grayskull, Evil-Lyn, and Queen Marlena in He-Man and the Masters of the Universe, Grandma Longneck in The Land Before Time franchise, Entrapta, Madame Razz, Scorpia, Shadow Weaver, and Glimmer in She-Ra: Princess of Power, Chromia in The Transformers, Aunt May in seasons 1-3 of Spider-Man, Nora Crest in Batman: The Animated Series, Dr. Abby Sinian in Swat Kats: The Radical Squadron), dies at age 50.
- October 13: Michael Lah, American animator and film director (Walt Disney Company, worked for Tex Avery), dies at age 83.
- October 21: Maxene Andrews, American singer (co-sang the "Johnny Fedora and Alice Blue Bonnet" segment in Make Mine Music and "Little Toot" in Melody Time), dies at age 79.
- October 23: Mary Wickes, American actress (live-action model for Cruella De Vil in 101 Dalmatians, voice of Laverne in The Hunchback of Notre Dame), dies at age 85.

=== November ===
- November 4: Jackie Banks, American animation checker and scene planner (Hanna-Barbera, This Is America, Charlie Brown, The Simpsons, Tom and Jerry: The Movie), dies at age 54.
- November 9: Robert O. Cook, American sound engineer (Walt Disney Animation Studios), dies at age 92.
- November 16: Charles Gordone, American playwright, actor, director, educator and actor (voice of Preacher Fox in Coonskin), dies at age 70.
- November 19: Wan Guchan, Chinese animator, film director (founder of the Shanghai Animation Film Studio, Shuzhendong Chinese Typewriter, Uproar in the Studio, The Camel's Dance, Princess Iron Fan, Havoc in Heaven, Why is the Crow Black-Coated), dies at age 95.

=== December ===
- December 4: Petar Gligorovski, Macedonian painter, comics artist, animator and film director (Adam 5 do 12), dies at age 57.
- December 20: Madge Sinclair, Jamaican actress (voice of Sarabi in The Lion King), dies from leukemia at age 57.
- December 30: Doris Grau, American actress (voice of Lunchlady Doris in The Simpsons, Doris Grossman in The Critic), dies at age 71.

=== Specific date unknown ===
- Alex Cubie, Scottish comics artist and animator (Rank Film Distributors), dies at age 83 or 84.

== See also ==
- 1995 in anime
