= China Film Archive =

Project of the CCP Publicity Department

- 中国电影资料馆
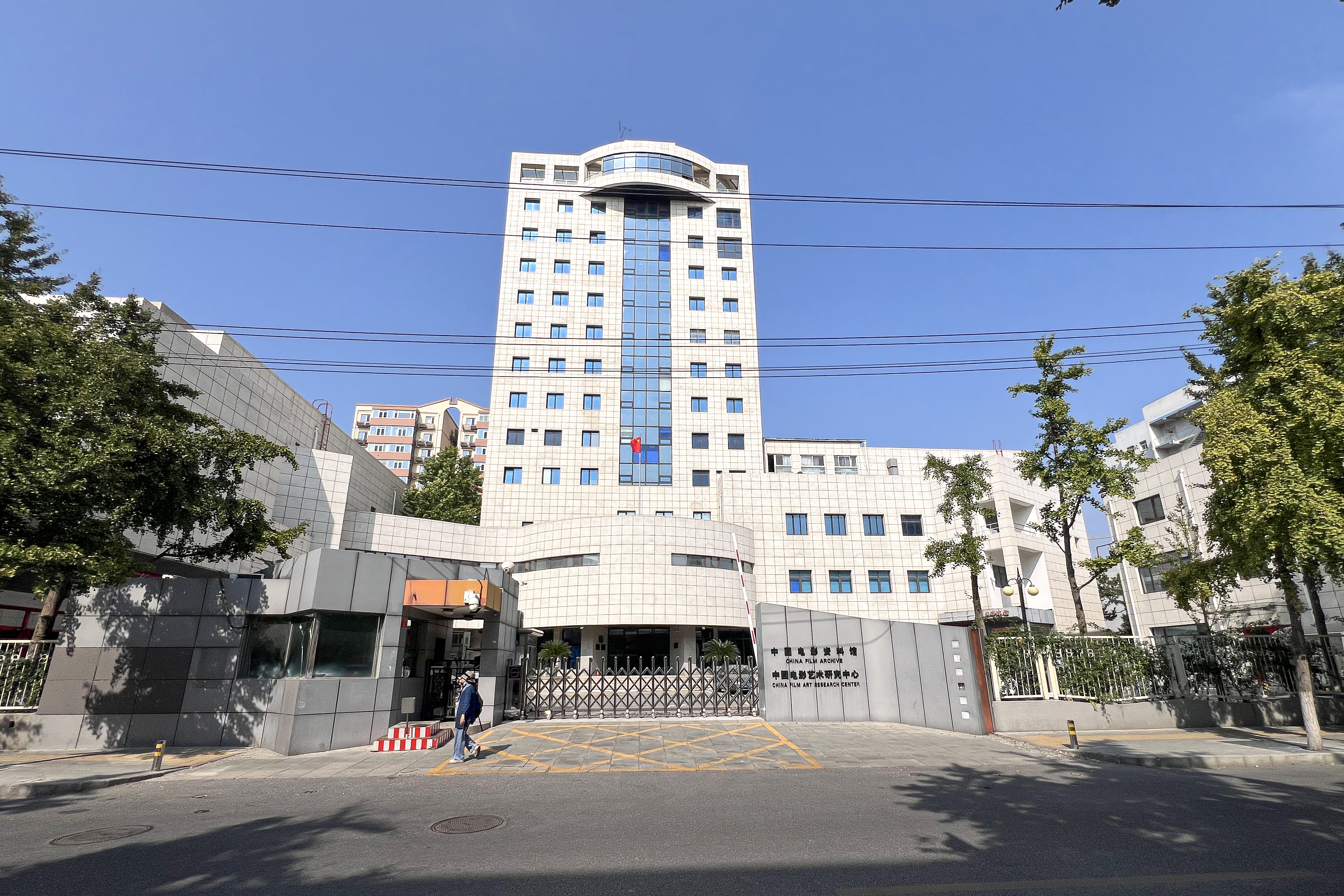

Film Archive overview
- Formed: 1958; 68 years ago
- Headquarters: 3 Wenhuiyuan Road, Haidian District, Beijing, China
- Minister responsible: Sun Xianghui
- Parent department: Publicity Department of the Chinese Communist Party
- Website: www.cfa.org.cn

The China Film Archive (CFA) is a Chinese film archive located in Beijing that is owned and operated by the Publicity Department of the Chinese Communist Party (CCP). It was founded to preserve existing Chinese films and restore 'lost' films. In recent years it has collaborated with international film bodies to assist in film preservation and has organised numerous events, most notably the Beijing International Film Festival.

== Aim ==
The intention of the Archive upon its foundation was for preserving Chinese films and screening them in rural areas. In 2012, approximately 2,400 Chinese-produced films between 1905 and 1976 were stored in the archive. Over time, the Archive has extended its services towards digitally restoring both Chinese and international films. In addition, the Archive undertakes research projects directed at finding 'lost' films and abandoned filmmaking practises.

== Organisation ==
=== History ===
==== Early establishment (1958–1979) ====
The Archive was founded in 1958 by the Chinese Communist Party. Prior to the foundation of the Archive, the China Film Management Corporation – which was founded in 1951 – served to oversee the national distribution of Chinese films. This body was renamed in 1958 to the China Film Distribution and Exhibition Corporation. The Archive was restricted during the Cultural Revolution (1966–1976) as Chinese films became of national interest. In 1971 the Archive and the China Film Distribution and Exhibition Corporation merged to establish the China Film Corporation. The role of this entity was to acquire all Chinese-made films and convert them into film prints which could be distributed in mainland China. The group dissolved several years later, and the Archive became its own organisation, however the name – China Film Corporation – is still in use.

==== Later developments (1980–present) ====
By 1980, under the leadership of Wang Hui, the Archive had acquired 10,000 film titles, in which 30% of these were nitrate copies. In 1984, the Archive partnered with the Cinema Research Office of the Institute of Art Research, to establish the China Film Art Research Centre (CFARC). The CFARC currently participates in research and restoration projects, as a division of the Archive. During the 1980s the Archive organised several, week-long screenings of Chinese films in which Chinese scholars and critics also become involved in the Archive through delivering papers. During this time the Archive held notable pre-release screenings of films such as Transmigration in December 1988, an event attended by Beijing Film Critics Li Tuo and Zheng Dongtian.

Under the leadership of Chen Jingliang from 1988 to 2006, The CFARC expanded and by 1999 the CFARC expanded its vault to store 25,000 Chinese and foreign films and had 15,000 books, magazines and other written materials in their archive. In 2005, in celebration of the Archive's centenary anniversary, a new building was opened.

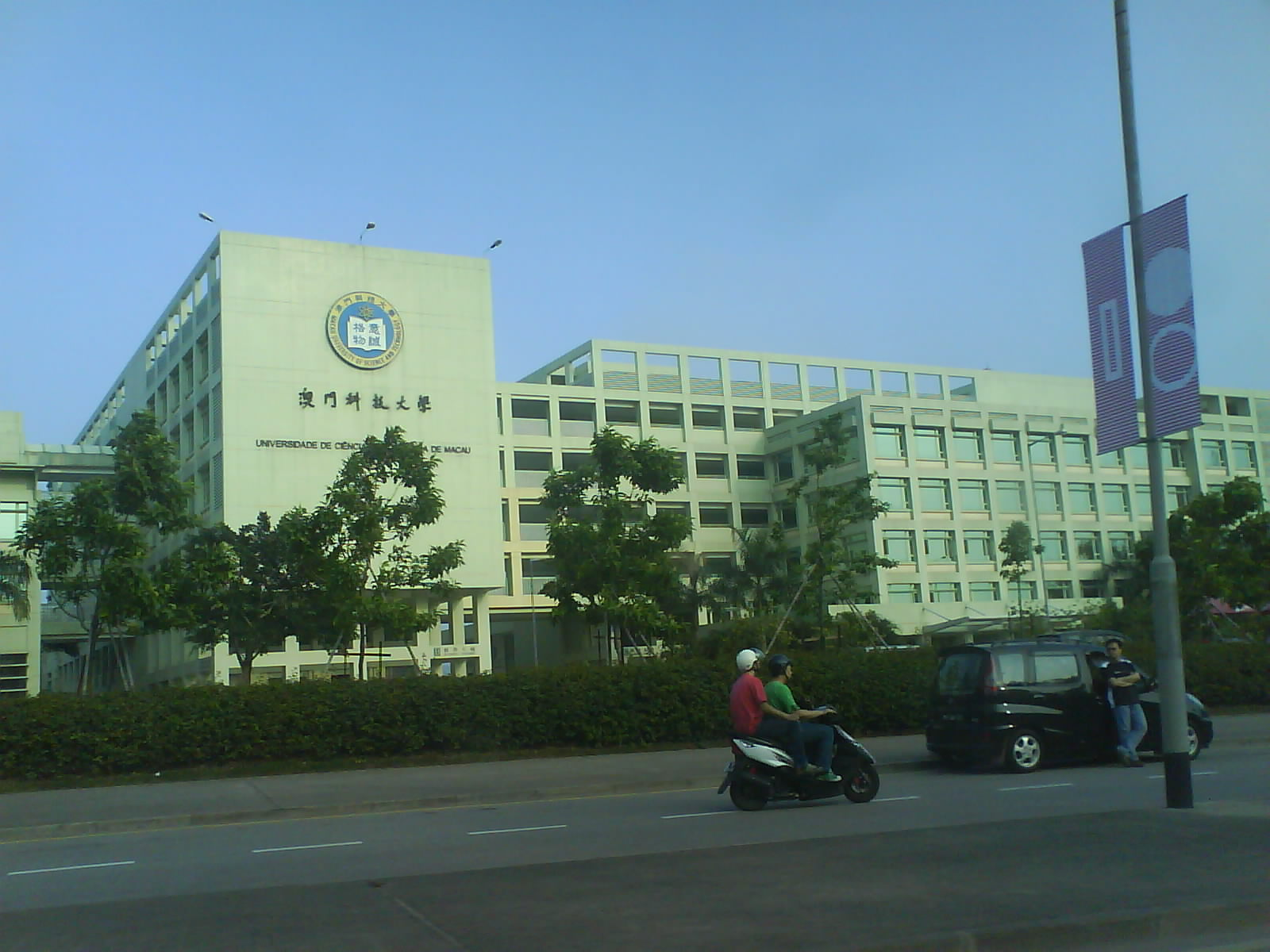
MACAU University of Science and Technology

As of 2020, the Archive was led by Sun Xianghui, who was also a guest professor at the MACAU University of Science and Technology. The Archive continues with film restoration efforts and has hosted numerous national conferences discussing subsections of film genres. In addition, the Archive assisted in regulating imported and exported films to and from China. The Archive currently holds historical artefacts – besides film prints – including photographs and documentaries of notable events. The Beijing Archive is separated into two sections, with one specifically for film and another section for written materials including scripts.

In 2012 the archive began to screen silent, Chinese animated films with an arranged, musical accompaniment. This is notable as the practise of screening silent with live music was not common.

In 2018, the journal Contemporary Animation (Dangdai Donghua) was launched by the State Administration of Press, Publication, Radio, Film and Television and the China Film Art Research Center. The journal is published on a quarterly basis and is notable as the only academic journal in mainland China to focus specifically on film animation. Each issue is separated into subtopics including new research, observation, education and new 'theory hotspots'.

=== Current operations ===
==== Funding ====
Currently the archive is expanded across two separate locations: with one archive located in Beijing and another in Xi'an, Shaanxi. The archive is state owned and operated, with the Chinese Communist Party granting the archive 35 million yuan annually for restoration projects and sponsoring a program which screens films in rural, Chinese communities. The Archive's director, Sun Xianghui, referred to this program in an interview in EasternKicks as '1 month, 1 village, 1 film', which operates by a single employee travelling with a digital projector to set up large, outdoor screenings of recently restored Chinese films. This program has expanded to screen multiple films per month and now the films shown are tailored towards the 'needs' of each rural area.

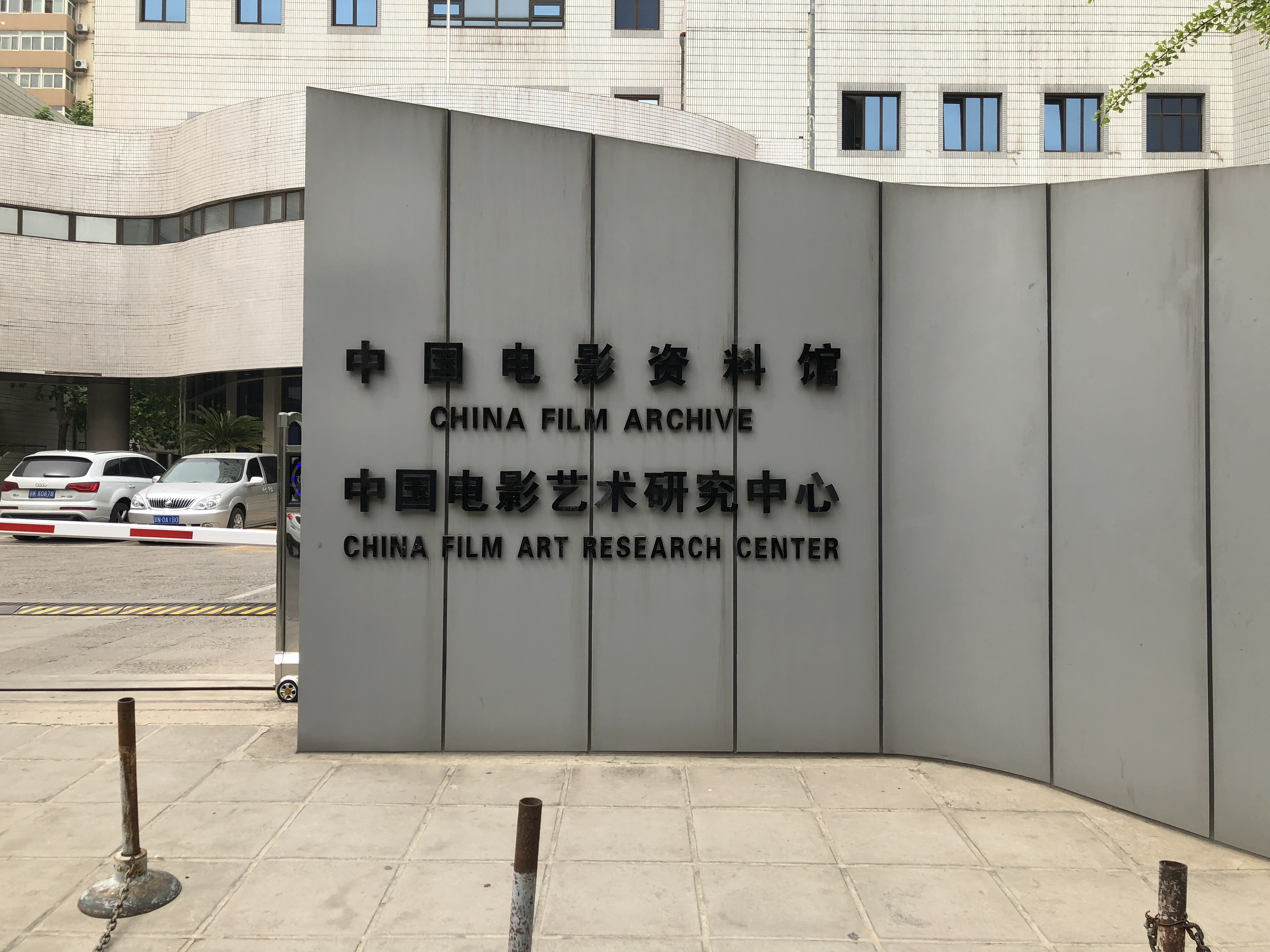
China Film Archive & China Film Art Research Center in 2018.

==== Education ====
The Archive offers post-graduate courses to Chinese students only. These courses include a three-year master's degree which is limited to 20 students per year and heavily focuses on Chinese film history. In addition, in a 2014 interview with Sun Xianghui, he explained that the archive had undertaken a project towards publishing a film 'oral history' series, featuring interviews with Chinese directors and other film personnel. Since the project's institution in 2008, four out of thirty volumes have been published.

==== Film distribution ====
The Measures for Control over Imported Films Regulations – which was introduced in October 1981 – mandates that all international feature films must be approved by the Ministry of Culture before they can be handed over to film distributors including the Archive. In relation to the screening of films produced outside of mainland China, 34 international films are permitted for public screening each year. These films are distributed by either China Film Group or Huaxia Film Distribution, for a flat-fee payment. However, the Archive does not fall under this quota as the Archive pays for the copyright to screen these films, not to commercially distribute them.

Since 2016, the Archive has expanded its number of art-house cinema complexes. In collaboration with Huaxia Film Distribution and Wanda Cinema Line among other films bodies, the Archive launched the China National Arthouse Film Alliance. This film body was designed to approve national and international art-house films for distribution in mainland China. As of 2017, over 300 new screens had been built per year in 31 of China's provinces and regions. Xianghui, stated that these films would be curated thematically and would rotate on an annual schedule, integrating these with other commercial films. This project is financially arranged through a flat-fee payment and an additional revenue payment. After passing through censorship tests, which including banning themes of LGBT, politics and nudity, the films bought would be publicly shown by Chinese distributors, who would also be responsible for their marketing.

==== China Film News ====
China Film News
- Editor-in-chief: Huangpu Yichuan
- Founded: January 15, 1985; 41 years ago
- Language: Simplified Chinese
- Website: https://www.chinafilmnews.cn/

The China Film Archive also publishes a film newspaper, China Film News (Chinese: 中国电影报), with operations overseen by the China Film Administration and it is currently the only film newspaper with secondary legal entity status in the country. China Film News covers news within the film industry and features columns for film reviews while also providing coverage on business, technology, rural news, social commentary, and international news. In addition, it collaborates with the American film magazine The Hollywood Reporter and the British film magazine Screen International to report on international film news. Originally established by the China Film Association on 15 January 1985, the newspaper was temporarily suspended in December 1989 after publishing 160 volumes. It resumed publication under the name China Film Weekly (中国电影周报) after being taken over by the China Film Archive in 1990, later reverting to its original name China Film News in 1997. In 2019, China Film News announced that the China Film Administration would bar Chinese films and filmmakers from participating in the Golden Horse Awards due to political controversies. Starting in 2021, China Film News became one of the co-organizers promoting "Four History" education in schools within the context of new media.

== Preservation and notable events ==
=== National preservation and events ===
==== Preservation and presentation of Chinese films ====
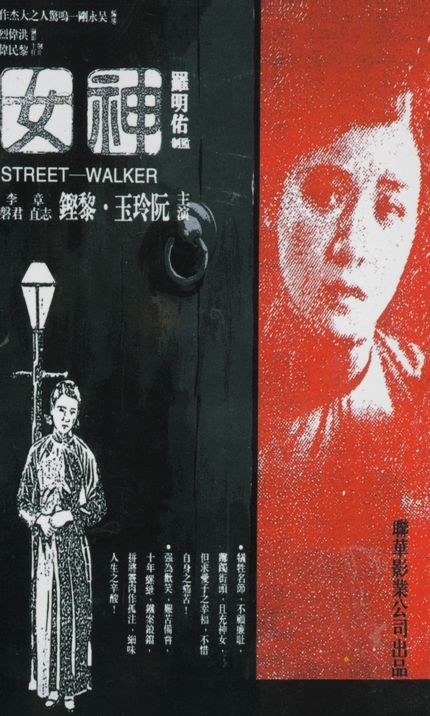
The poster for the silent film The Goddess (1934). The film was digitally restored and premiered at the 58th BFI London Film Festival in 2014.

One notable recent restoration project was that of the Chinese silent-era film The Goddess (1934). As part of the archive's Digital Restoration Project – which launched in 2005 – The Goddess is one film that was digitally restored in both sound and visual quality, for re-distribution and screenings. The project was completed in 2014 and was screened at the 58th BFI London Film Festival alongside a new orchestral score for the film composed by Zou Ye.

===== 'Restored Treasures' Series =====
A short clip from the silent film Laborer's Love (1922), screened at the Archive as part of the 'Restored Treasures' series.

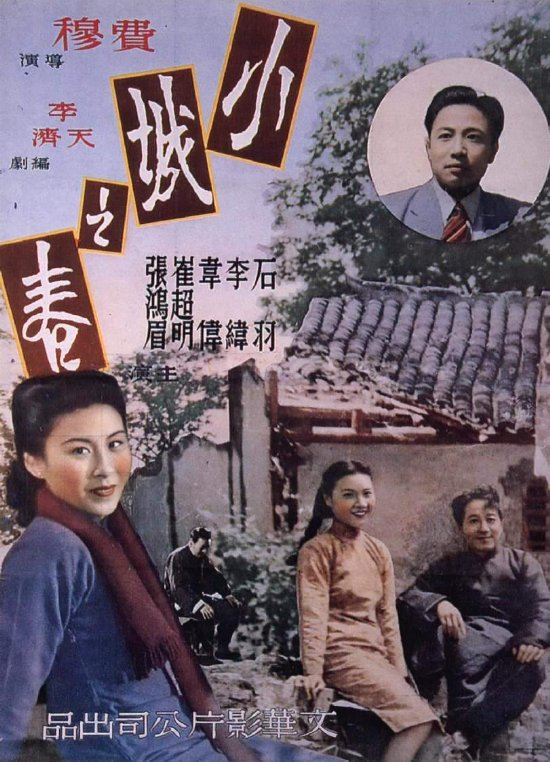
The poster for the Chinese Film, Spring in a Small Town (1948). The film was screened as part of the 'Restored Treasures' Series.

The Archive works closely with other film archives, particularly the Chinese Taipei Film Archive and the Hong Kong Film Archive. Between February and April 2014, the Hong Kong Film Archive screened four films that had recently been restored by the China Film Archive, as part of a 'Restored Treasures' series. The four films presented included the silent, short film Laborer's Love (1922), the silent film Red Heroine (1929), and the black and white films, Spring in a Small Town (1948), and Captain Guan (1951). Film critics were also invited to speak to the audience on their opinions of the film and two of the films shown featured a live music accompaniment by Kung Chi-shing and Shame Aspergren.

The 'Restored Treasures' series also included the screening of Chinese animated films. The first series, 'Restored Treasures: The Enigma of Chinese Animations (1)' premiered in May 2014, and screened the films; The Mouse and the Frog (1934), Princess Iron-Fan (1941), The Kite (1943) and Dreaming to Be Emperor (1947). The second series titled, 'The Enigma of Chinese Animation (2)' premiered on June 1, 2014. The programme featured films including The Proud General (1956), Pigsy Eats Watermelon (1958), Where Is Mamma? (1960) and The Cowherd's Flute (1963). The final series, 'The Engima of Chinese Animation (3)' premiered a month later on July 6, 2014. The film lineup included Three Monks (1980) and The Deer Fairy (1981). These screenings also included a talk by animators Neco Lo, Keeto Lam and Yu Man-fai. Table 1 is a summary of all of the animated films shown during the series.

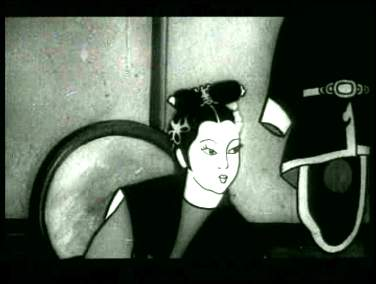
A still from the animated film, Princess Iron Fan (1941). The film was screened as part of the 'Restored Treasures' series in May, 2014.

Table 1: Animated Films Screened at The 'Restored Treasures' Series
Film (Year)	Director/s	Studio/Production Company	Format/Media	Run Time (minutes)	Reference
'Restored Treasures: The Enigma of Chinese Animations (1)' (May, 2014)
The Mouse and the Frog (1934)	Wan Laiming, Wan Guchan, Wan Chaochen (Wan Brothers)	Mingxing	Black and white Cel/traditional/Classical Animation	10 minutes	The Government of the Hong Kong Special Administrative Region & Leisure and Cultural Services Department:
Princess Iron-Fan (1941)	Wan Guchan Wan Laiming	China United Film Company	Black and white Cel/traditional/Classical Animation	72 Minutes	The Government of the Hong Kong Special Administrative Region & Leisure and Cultural Services Department:
The Kite (1943)	Paintings: Liang Jin	North China Amusement Company	Black and white Cel/traditional/Classical Animation	8 minutes	The Government of the Hong Kong Special Administrative Region & Leisure and Cultural Services Department:
Dreaming to Be Emperor (1947).	Design: You Hong Cinematography: Chi Yong	Northeast Film Studio	Black and white Cel/traditional/Classical Animation	14 minutes	The Government of the Hong Kong Special Administrative Region & Leisure and Cultural Services Department:
'Restored Treasures: The Enigma of Chinese Animation (2)' (June 1, 2014)
The Proud General (1956)	Te Wei	Shanghai Animation Film Studio	Coloured Cel/traditional/Classical Animation	24 minutes	The Government of the Hong Kong Special Administrative Region & Leisure and Cultural Services Department:
Pigsy Eats Watermelon (1958)	Wan Guchan, Wan Laiming	Shanghai Animation Film Studio	Coloured Cel/traditional/Classical Animation	21 minutes	The Government of the Hong Kong Special Administrative Region & Leisure and Cultural Services Department:
Where Is Mamma? (1960)	[collective film]	Shanghai Animation Film Studio	Coloured Animation	15 minutes	The Government of the Hong Kong Special Administrative Region & Leisure and Cultural Services Department:
The Cowherd's Flute (1963)	Te Wei, Qian Jiajun	Shanghai Animation Film Studio	Coloured Cel/traditional/Classical Animation	20 minutes	The Government of the Hong Kong Special Administrative Region & Leisure and Cultural Services Department:
'Restored Treasures: The Engima of Chinese Animation (3)' (July 6, 2014)
Three Monks (1980)	A Da	Shanghai Animation Film Studio	Coloured Cel/traditional/Classical Animation	19 minutes	The Government of the Hong Kong Special Administrative Region & Leisure and Cultural Services Department:
The Deer Fairy (1981).	Qian Jiajun, Dai Tielang	Shanghai Animation Film Studio	Coloured Cel/traditional/Classical Animation	25 minutes	The Government of the Hong Kong Special Administrative Region & Leisure and Cultural Services Department:

==== Events ====
Between 1–27 September 1984, the Archive organised a retrospective showing of 46 Chinese films from between 1920 and 1940. The event also featured a conference with Chinese scholars and critics who delivered over 60 research papers. The showing had an attendance of about 20,000 people.

===== Joirs Ivens Seminar and Screening (2009) =====
In 2009, a seminar and screening of Dutch director Joirs Ivens' films was held at the archive. This was to acknowledge the relationship between China and Ivens. The seminar was sponsored by the archive and other Chinese film bodies including the China Film Museum, the Huaxia Film Distribution and the China Filmmakers Association. International scholars from Canada, France, The Netherlands and the United States of America attended the seminar and the screening of four of Ivens' films; The 400 Million (1938), Before Spring (1958), Football Story (1976) and A Tale of The Wind (1988).

===== Conferences =====
The Archive has hosted multiple conferences discussing different film genres and time periods, to work towards the goal of creating a 'comprehensive history' of Chinese Cinema. One was in 2012, which discussed early Chinese cinema. Two other conferences were held in 2014 discussing socialist and post-socialist cinema. From March 1 to May 12, 2021, the Inaugural Conference of the Association for Chinese Animation Studies was held online via Zoom. The Archive provided several animated, short films which were screened during the event, including the Wan Brothers' films The Mouse and The Frog (1934), Songs of Resistance 2 (1938) and Songs of Resistance 5 (1939). Other films screened, owned by the Archive included, The Kite (1943), Dreaming to be Emperor (1943) and Capturing the Turtle in the Jar (1948). Tan Qiuwen, an employee from the China Film Art Research Centre, represented the archive in a panel discussion on March 2, titled 'An Overview of the Animated Data in the China Film Archive'.

==== Beijing International Film Festival ====
Since 2015, the Archive has been the primary host and co-programmer of the Beijing International Film Festival. Notable contributions to the festival including the screening of the recently restored films Yellow Earth (1984) and The Horse Thief (1986) – both from the mid-1980s – at the 2018 festival.

=== International preservation and events ===
==== Preservation of international films ====
===== Santi-Vina (1954) =====
The Archive has collaborated with international film bodies towards preserving both Chinese and international films. One such project was the archive's collaborative effort with the British Film Institute and with Thailand's national archive – the Thai Film Archive – towards restoring the award-winning Thai film, Santi-Vina (1954). A copy of the film from the Archive was donated to Thailand for restoration efforts, as China had previously bought a copy of the film during its original release at the Southeast Asian Film Festival. However this copy of the film was used as a guide, with another copy of the film from the Russian Organisation Gosfilmofond, utilised as the negatives which were digitally scanned and cleaned. This is as the Archive's copy had two missing scenes, a 'magenta hue' and Chinese subtitles burned into the negatives. However, the Archive's film was used as a guide, as the negatives of the copy from Gosfilofond had shrunk by 0.4%. The film was digitally restored by the L'Immagine Ritrovata laboratory. After its restoration, it premiered at the 2016 Cannes Film Festival, in the 'Cannes Classics' section alongside other international films. This was notable as it was the first Thai film to be selected into this category.

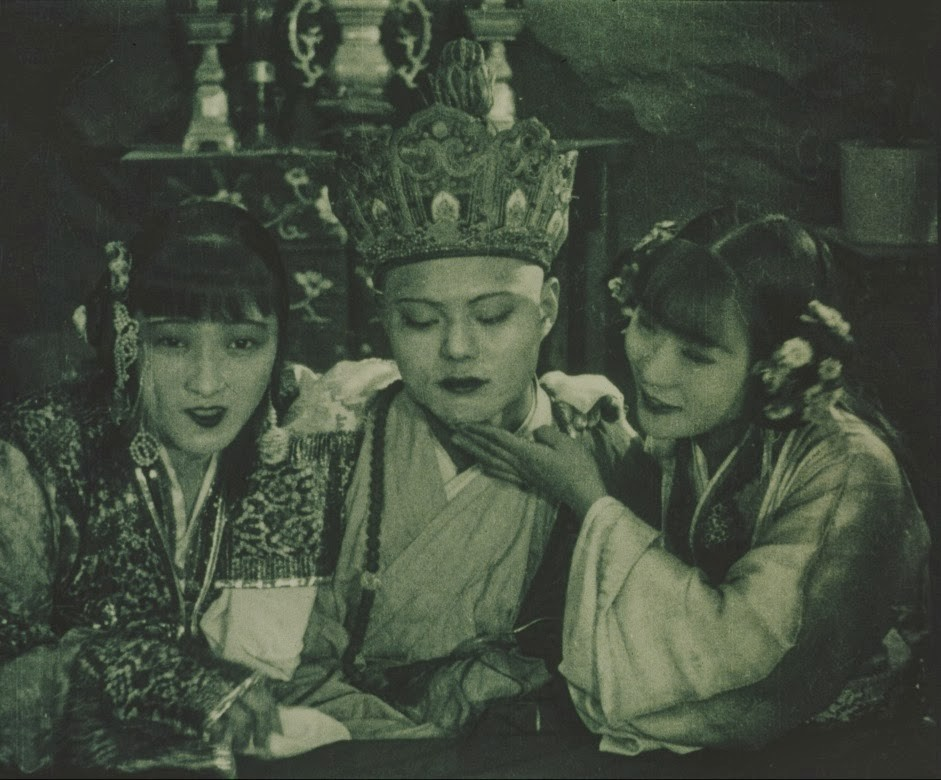
A still from the film Pan Si Dong (1927), also known as The Cave of the Silken Web. The film was digitally restored by the Archive and in 2014, it premiered at the South Festival in Oslo.

===== International Federation of Film Archives (FIAF) =====
As a member of the International Federation of Film Archives (FIAF), the Archive has collaborated with the international organisation in numerous film restoration projects. In 2011 the Chinese film Pan Si Dong (1927) was discovered at an archive at Mo I Rana, a section of the National Library of Norway. The film was handed to the Archive by the National Library of Norway – as facilitated by the FIFA – where it was restored and shown at the South Festival in Oslo in 2014. Other film restoration projects the FIFA has been involved in included Kong Fuzi (1940) – which was screened in 2009 before being returned the Archive in 2010 – and Su-Epo Ryo (1940), which was returned to the Archive by a Korean archive.

===== Korean Film Archive =====
On two separate expeditions between 2005 and 2006 to the Archive, eight Korean films were found, which were eventually restored and presented for public viewing. Mimong (1936) was another Chinese film that was discovered in Korea, after it was presumed to have been lost by the Archive. The film was not restored at the Archive but at the Korean Film Archive.

===== British Film Institute – Around China with A Movie Camera =====
In 2015, during the year of cultural exchange between the United Kingdom and China, it was reported that the British Film Institute (BFI) and the Archive were collaborating on a project. The BFI announced at the 2015 Shanghai International Film Festival that it was collaborating with the Archive to create a film compilation based on the Chinese-produced films in the BFI's archive, called Around China with a Movie Camera. Numerous recently restored films between 1900 and 1948 – including the Anna May Wong film Piccadilly (1929) – would be screened. The compilation was composed of home movies, travelogues and newsreels by British and French filmmakers, and featured footage filmed between 1900 and 1925 of notable cities in China including Hong Kong, Shanghai, Chongqing and Guangzhou. This compilation was screened at the BFI's Southbank Cinema with a live score by Ruth Chan, in February 2016.

==== Notable international events ====
The Archive has co-sponsored and hosted several international film events. The International Film/Cinema Weeks screening in 1989 was organised by the Archive and the CFARC in collaboration with other film bodies in the United States, France, England. During this festival more than 300 films were shown. Several years later in 1996, the Symposium on Film Collections in Asia – a meeting organised by UNESCO and co-sponsored by the Archive and the Ministry of Broadcasting, TV and Film – was held in Beijing. A collection of papers was shown during this conference.

===== Christie Digital =====
In August 2000, the Canadian-based company Christie Digital was invited to Beijing as part of the Beijing International Radio, TV & Film Equipment Exhibition. They were invited to educate Chinese Government Officials and Film restorers on their new projector – the Christie Digipro Cinema Projector. The viewing also included a walking tour of the projection room for the Chinese officials and restorers. The event was significant as it was the first time a digital projector had been used in mainland China.

===== New York Film Festival (2008) =====
The New York Film Festival in September 2008 was notable as it was the first major screening in the United States of 20 Chinese films from the 'golden era' of Chinese cinema – between the 1930s and 1940s – and several from after the Cultural Revolution in 1976. Two notable films that were screened were by Xie Jin – Red Detachment of Women (1960) and Two Stage Sisters (1964). The festival's director, Richard Peña, worked with the Archive in Beijing for a week in preparation, as the Archive contributed by making prints of the films shown, with English subtitles.

== Film scholarship ==
Prior to the Archive's institution, academic scholarship on Chinese film during the 1940s was difficult as there was no research material to draw upon. Currently, the Archive allows international and Chinese scholars into their digital encyclopedia for research purposes. As every film in the Archive has not been digitalised, they are not all accessible.

The China Film Archive has contributed to the accessibility of Taiwan and Hong Kong film scholarship. Prior to the 1980s, there was limited academic discourse on films from these countries, however interest in these films increased prior to the return of Hong Kong in 1997 to China. In anticipation, the Archive released a collection of articles specialising in Hong Kong film as well as a comprehensive reference list. In 2007, the Archive expanded on this collection of Hong Kong film research papers, by publishing more articles written by scholars from mainland China, Hong Kong and other international countries.

== Animated films ==
List of Animated Films Held by the China Film Archive (1934–1981)

Name of Film (Year)	Director/s	Studio/Production Company	Format/Media	Run Time (minutes)	Notes	Reference
The Mouse and the Frog (1934)	Wan Laiming, Wan Guchan, Wan Chaochen (Wan Brothers)	Mingxing	Black and white Cel/traditional/Classical Animation	10 minutes	Screened as part of the 'Restored Treasures' Series (1). Screened at the 2021 Inaugural Conference of the Association for Chinese Animation Studies.	Leisure and Cultural Services Department:
Songs of Resistance 2 (1938)	Wan Laiming, Wan Guchan, Wan Chaochen (Wan Brothers)	n/a	Cel/traditional/Classical Animation	n/a	Screened at the 2021 Inaugural Conference of the Association for Chinese Animation Studies.	Leisure and Cultural Services Department:
Songs of Resistance 5 (1939)	Wan Laiming, Wan Guchan, Wan Chaochen (Wan Brothers)	n/a	Cel/traditional/Classical Animation	n/a	Screened at the 2021 Inaugural Conference of the Association for Chinese Animation Studies.	Leisure and Cultural Services Department:
Princess Iron-Fan (1941)	Wan Guchan Wan Laiming	China United Film Company	Black and white Cel/traditional/Classical Animation	72 minutes	Screened as part of the 'Restored Treasures' Series (1).	Leisure and Cultural Services Department:
The Kite (1943)	paintings: Liang Jin	North China Amusement Company	Black and white Cel/traditional/Classical Animation	8 minutes	Screened as part of the 'Restored Treasures' Series (1). Screened at the 2021 Inaugural Conference of the Association for Chinese Animation Studies.	Leisure and Cultural Services Department:
Dreaming to Be Emperor (1947)	Design: You Hong Cinematography: Chi Yong	Northeast Film Studio	Black and white Cel/traditional/Classical Animation	14 minutes	Screened as part of the 'Restored Treasures' Series (1). Screened at the 2021 Inaugural Conference of the Association for Chinese Animation Studies.	Leisure and Cultural Services Department:
Capturing Turtle in the Jar (1948)	Mochinaga Tadahito	n/a	Cel/traditional/Classical Animation	n/a	Screened at the 2021 Inaugural Conference of the Association for Chinese Animation Studies.	The Ohio State University:
Thank you Kitty (1950)	Fang Ming	Shanghai Film Studio	Cel/traditional/Classical Animation	20 minutes		Association for Chinese Animation Studies
A Little Hero (1953)	Jin Xi	Shanghai Film Studio	Puppetry	30 minutes		Association for Chinese Animation Studies
The Dream of Xiaomei (1954)	Jin Xi	Shanghai Film Studio	Puppetry and Live Action	30 minutes		Association for Chinese Animation Studies
The Proud General /The Conceited General (1956)	Te Wei, Li Keruo	Shanghai Animation Film Studio	Coloured Cel/traditional/Classical Animation	24 minutes	Screened as part of the 'Restored Treasures' Series (2).	Association for Chinese Animation Studies & Leisure and Cultural Services Department:
A New Football (1957)	Zhang Chaoqun	Shanghai Animation Film Studio	Puppetry	20 minutes		Association for Chinese Animation Studies
Who Sings Best (1958)	Jin Xi	Shanghai Animation Film Studio	Puppetry	10 minutes		Association for Chinese Animation Studies
Celebrating the Harvest during the Mid-Autumn Festival (1958)	[collective film]	Shanghai Animation Film Studio	Cel/traditional/Classical Animation	7 minutes		Association for Chinese Animation Studies
Pigsy Eats Watermelon (1958)	Wan Guchan, Wan Laiming	Shanghai Animation Film Studio	Coloured Cel/traditional/Classical Animation	21 minutes	Screened as part of the 'Restored Treasures' Series (2).	Leisure and Cultural Services Department:
Overtake the John Bull (1958)	Qu Jianfang, Xu Jingda, Yan Dingxian	Shanghai Animation Film Studio	Cel/traditional/Classical Animation	7 minutes		Association for Chinese Animation Studies
Praising the General Line (1958)	Wan Laiming	Shanghai Animation Film Studio	Cel/traditional/Classical Animation	2 minutes		Association for Chinese Animation Studies
A Little Inventor (1958)	Jin Xi	Shanghai Animation Film Studio	Puppetry	20 minutes		Association for Chinese Animation Studies
The Little Donkey Wiseacre (1958)	Rong Lei, Liu Hui	Changchun Film Studio	Puppetry	n/a		Association for Chinese Animation Studies
Killing Sparrows (1958)	Chen Zhenghong, You Lei	Shanghai Animation Film Studio	Puppetry	15 minutes		Association for Chinese Animation Studies
The Cuckoos Sing Too Late (1959)	Qian Jiajun	Shanghai Animation Film Studio	Cel/traditional/Classical Animation	10 minutes		Association for Chinese Animation Studies
Turtle and Monkey Dividing a Banana Tree (1959)	Wan Guchan	Shanghai Animation Film Studio	Paper-cutting	10 minutes		Association for Chinese Animation Studies
A Shoe (1959)	Jin Xi	Shanghai Animation Film Studio	Puppetry	40 minutes		Association for Chinese Animation Studies
The Big Radish (1960)	Wan Chaochen	Shanghai Animation Film Studio	Puppetry	20 minutes		Association for Chinese Animation Studies
Little Tadpoles Look for Mama (1960)	Te Wei, Qian Jiajun	Shanghai Animation Film Studio	Ink Painting	20 Minutes		Association for Chinese Animation Studies
Where Is Mamma? (1960)	[collective film]	Shanghai Animation Film Studio	Coloured Animation	15 minutes	Screened as part of the 'Restored Treasures' Series (2).	Leisure and Cultural Services Department:
Segments of Chinese Ink-painting Animation (1960)	[collective film]	Shanghai Animation Film Studio	Ink Painting	20 minutes		Association for Chinese Animation Studies
Showing True Colors (1960)	Wang Shuchen, Qian Yunda	Shanghai Animation Film Studio	Cel/traditional/Classical Animation	20 minutes		Association for Chinese Animation Studies
Speed Up (1960)	He Yumen	Shanghai Animation Film Studio	Cel/traditional/Classical Animation	11 minutes		Association for Chinese Animation Studies
Story of Subduing the Dragon (1960)	Wan Guchan, Yue Lu, Chen Zhenghong	Shanghai Animation Film Studio	Puppetry	11 minutes		Association for Chinese Animation Studies
Daming County (1962)	Yu Zheguang, Zhang Chaoqun	Shanghai Animation Film Studio	Documentary Style / Puppetry	10 minutes		Association for Chinese Animation Studies
The Cowherd's Flute (1963)	Te Wei, Qian Jiajun	Shanghai Animation Film Studio	Coloured Cel/traditional/Classical Animation	20 minutes	Screened as part of the 'Restored Treasures' Series (2).	Leisure and Cultural Services Department:
New Deeds on the Roadside (1964)	Wang Shuchen	Shanghai Animation Film Studio	Puppetry	20 minutes		Association for Chinese Animation Studies
Chief Li Challenges the Cookhouse Squad (1965)	You Lei	Shanghai Animation Film Studio	Puppetry	30 minutes		Association for Chinese Animation Studies
The Boy from South (1965)	Zhan Tongxuan, Xia Bingjun, Cheng Zhongyue	Shanghai Animation Film Studio	Documentary style/String Puppetry	40 minutes		Association for Chinese Animation Studies
Two Little Brothers (1965)	Zhang Chaoqun	Shanghai Animation Film Studio	Puppetry	20 minutes		Association for Chinese Animation Studies
Xiaolin's Diary (1965)	Hu Jinqing	Shanghai Animation Film Studio	Paper-cutting	10 minutes		Association for Chinese Animation Studies
The Little Eighth-Route Soldier (1974)	You Lei	Shanghai Animation Film Studio	Puppetry	50 minutes		Association for Chinese Animation Studies
The Ferry (1975)	He Yumen	Shanghai Animation Film Studio	Cel/traditional/Classical Animation	20 minutes		Association for Chinese Animation Studies
Horses Galloping (1975)	Jin Xi, Liu Huiyi	Shanghai Animation Film Studio	Puppetry	50 minutes		Association for Chinese Animation Studies
The Bamboo Shoot Growing in the House (1976)	Hu Jinqing, Zhou Keqin	Shanghai Animation Film Studio	Paper-cutting	20 minutes		Association for Chinese Animation Studies
The Golden Wild Goose (1976)	Te Wei, Shen Zuwei	Shanghai Animation Film Studio	Paper-cutting	50 minutes		Association for Chinese Animation Studies
Trial Voyage (1976)	Yan Dingxian	Shanghai Animation Film Studio	Cel/traditional/Classical Animation	57 minutes		Association for Chinese Animation Studies
Two Little Peacocks (1977)	Yan Dingxian	Shanghai Animation Film Studio	Cel/traditional/Classical Animation	30 minutes		Association for Chinese Animation Studies
Fiery Banners (1977)	He Yumen	Shanghai Animation Film Studio	Cel/traditional/Classical Animation	19 minutes		Association for Chinese Animation Studies
One Night at the Art Studio (1978)	Ada, Lin Wenxiao	Shanghai Animation Film Studio	Cel/traditional/Classical Animation	20 minutes		Association for Chinese Animation Studies
Three Monks (1980)	A Da	Shanghai Animation Film Studio	Coloured Cel/traditional/Classical Animation	19 minutes	Screened at third series of 'Restored Treasures' series (3).	Leisure and Cultural Services Department:
The Deer Fairy (1981)	Qian Jiajun, Dai Tielang	Shanghai Animation Film Studio	Coloured Cel/traditional/Classical Animation	25 minutes	Screened at third series of 'Restored Treasures' Series (3).	Leisure and Cultural Services Department:

== See also ==
- List of film archives
