= Wan (surname) =

Wan (万/萬)
- Pronunciation: Wàn (Mandarin); Man (Cantonese); Ban/Png (Hokkien)
- Language: Chinese

Origin
- Language: Old Chinese

Other names
- Variant form: Man/Ban

Wan is the Mandarin pinyin and Wade–Giles romanization of the Chinese surname written 万 in simplified Chinese and 萬 in traditional Chinese. It is romanized as Man in Cantonese. It is listed 162nd in the Song dynasty classic text Hundred Family Surnames. As of 2008, it is the 88th most common surname in China, shared by 2.4 million people. The province with the most people having the surname is Anhui. In 2011, of the top 30 cities in China it was one of the top ten surnames of Nanchang, where it is the fourth-most common name.

== Notable people ==
- Wan Yu (died 272), Chancellor of Eastern Wu
- Consort Wan (1428–1487), consort of the Chenghua Emperor of the Ming dynasty
- Wan Quan (1495–1585), Ming dynasty paediatrician
- Wan Hu (16th century), legendary "rocket scientist"
- Wan Fulin (1880–1951), military governor of Heilongjiang province
- The Wan brothers, founders of the Chinese animation industry
  - Wan Laiming (1900–1997)
  - Wan Guchan (1900–1995)
  - Wan Chaochen (1906–1992)
  - Wan Dihuan (*1907)
- Wan Laisheng (1903–1995), martial artist
- Wan Yi (万毅; 1907–1997), general and politician
- Wan Jiabao, pen name Cao Yu (1910–1996), influential playwright
- Wan Xiaotang (1916–1966), Communist Party chief of Tianjin
- Wan Li (1916–2015), Vice Premier, Politburo member
- Wan Haifeng (1920–2023), Chinese general
- Wan Shaofen (born 1930), former Communist Party chief of Jiangxi province, the first female provincial party chief
- Wan Long (born 1940), billionaire businessman, CEO of WH Group
- Wan Xueyuan (born 1941), former Governor of Zhejiang province
- Wan Runnan (1946–2025), software engineer, businessman and human rights activist
- Wan Jifei (born 1948), politician, a son of Wan Li
- Wan Jen (born 1950), Taiwanese filmmaker
- Wan Gang (born 1952), Ministry of Science and Technology of China
- Wan Exiang (born 1956), Vice President of the Supreme People's Court of China
- Alex Man (Wan Ziliang; born 1957), Hong Kong actor
- Wan Guanghua (born 1961), economist
- Wan Yanhai (born 1963), AIDS activist
- Alex Wan (born 1967), Atlanta politician
- Joey Meng (Wan Qiwen; born 1970), Hong Kong actress
- Wan Xiaoli (born 1971), singer
- James Wan, (born 1977), horror film director
- Wan Cheng (born 1985), football player
- Wan Houliang (born 1986), football player
- Wan Peng (born 1996), actress
