= 1907 in animation =

Events in 1907 in animation.

== Films released ==
- Date unknown – Katsudō Shashin, the oldest known work of animation from Japan. Its creator is unknown.

== Births ==
=== January ===
- January 1: Carlo Cossio, Italian comics artist and animator, (d. 1964).
- January 28: Connie Rasinski, American animator and film director (Hansel and Gretel, Terrytoons), (d. 1965).

=== February ===
- February 12: Joseph Kearns, American actor (voice of the Doorknob in Alice in Wonderland), (d. 1962).
- February 18: Billy De Wolfe, American actor (voice of Professor Hinkle in Frosty the Snowman), (d. 1974).
- February 22: Sheldon Leonard, American actor (voice of Dodsworth in Kiddin' the Kitten and A Peck o' Trouble, Kid Banty in Sock-a-Doodle-Do, the title character in Linus the Lionhearted), (d. 1997).
- February 26: Dub Taylor, American actor (voice of Digger in The Rescuers), (d. 1994).
- February 27: Egon von Tresckow, German animator, illustrator, comics artist and caricaturist (worked for UFA and the films of Hans Fischerkoesen), (d. 1952).

=== March ===
- March 4: Patrick McGeehan, American actor (voice of the Jimmy Durante buzzard in What's Buzzin' Buzzard, Black Cat in Bad Luck Blackie, Joe Bear in Rock-a-Bye Bear), (d. 1988).
- March 5: Thomas McKimson, American animator and cartoonist, designed Tweety (Warner Bros. Cartoons, Walt Disney Animation Studios) (d. 1998).
- March 11: Robert Bentley, American animator (Warner Bros. Cartoons, Fleischer Studios, the Metro-Goldwyn-Mayer cartoon studio, Walter Lantz Productions, UPA, Hanna-Barbera, Filmation) (d. 2000).
- March 26: Leigh Harline, American songwriter and composer (The Goddess of Spring, Snow White and the Seven Dwarfs, Pinocchio, Mr. Bug Goes to Town), (d. 1969).
- March 31: Dorothy Jones, American screenwriter and wife of Chuck Jones (Gay Purr-ee), (d. 1978).

=== April ===
- April 12: Hardie Gramatky, American children's writer, illustrator, animator, and watercolorist, creator of Little Toot (Walt Disney Animation Studios), (d. 1979).
- April 19: Cecil Surry, American animator and cartoonist (Walt Disney Animation Studios, Walter Lantz Productions, Warner Bros. Cartoons, Metro-Goldwyn-Mayer cartoon studio, UPA) (d. 1956).

=== May ===
- May 20: Volney White, American animator and animation director (Looney Tunes) (d. 1966).
- May 22: Hergé, Belgian cartoonist (creator of The Adventures of Tintin), (d. 1983).

=== June ===
- June 6: Edward H. Plumb, American film composer and orchestrator (Walt Disney Animation Studios), (d. 1958).
- June 16: Jack Albertson, American actor, comedian and singer (voice of Amos Slade in The Fox and the Hound), (d. 1981).
- June 27: John McIntire, American actor (voice of Rufus in The Rescuers, Mr. Digger in The Fox and the Hound), (d. 1991).

=== July ===
- July 25: Dallas Bower, English film and television director and producer (Alice in Wonderland), (d. 1999).
- July 27: Jesse Marsh, American animator and comics writer (Make Mine Music, Pluto), (d. 1966).
- July 30: Roy Williams, American animator storyman (Walt Disney Animation Studios) and presenter, (d. 1976).

=== August ===
- August 8: Virgil Walter Ross, American animator and cartoonist (Warner Bros. Cartoons, A Wild Hare) (d. 1996).
- August 9: Richard Bickenbach, American animator, layout artist, character designer, and cartoonist (Warner Bros. Cartoons, Metro-Goldwyn-Mayer cartoon studio, Hanna-Barbera), (d. 1994).
- August 12: Joe Besser, American actor, comedian, and musician (voice of Babu in Jeannie, Scare Bear in Yogi's Space Race and Galaxy Goof-Ups, Putty Puss in The Houndcats, Elmo in Shirt Tales, Cupid in The Smurfs), (d. 1988).
- August 14: Dick Lundy, American animator and film director and producer (Walt Disney Company, MGM, Walter Lantz, Hanna-Barbera, co-creator of Donald Duck), (d. 1990).
- August 20: Alan Reed, American voice actor (voice of Fred Flintstone in The Flintstones, Dum Dum in Touche Turtle and Dum Dum, Boris the Russian Wolfhound in Lady and the Tramp), (d. 1977).
- August 29: Lurene Tuttle, American actress (voice of Duck's Mother in Down and Dirty Duck, Clara's Grandmother in The Story of Heidi, Aunt Gerda in Nutcracker Fantasy, Carlton's Mother in Carlton Your Doorman, Aunt Em in Thanksgiving in the Land of Oz), (d. 1986).

=== September ===
- September 7: Jack Mather, American actor (voice of Wally Walrus in Woody Woodpecker), (d. 1966).
- September 15: Alvin Childress, American actor (voice of Jasper in Puppetoons), (d. 1986).
- September 26: Willard Bowsky, American animator (Fleischer Studios), (d. 1944).

=== October ===
- October 8: Art Babbitt, American animation director and animator, (creator of Goofy, worked for Terrytoons, Walt Disney Company, Hanna-Barbera, and UPA), (d. 1992).

=== November ===
- November 4: Bennie Benjamin, Virgin Islands-born American songwriter (Fun and Fancy Free, Melody Time), (d. 1989).
- November 14: Astrid Lindgren, Swedish children's book author and writer (creator of Pippi Longstocking), (d. 2002).
- November 16: Burgess Meredith, American actor (voice of Puff the Magic Dragon in a series of TV specials, Golobulus in G.I. Joe: The Movie), (d. 1997).
- November 17: Les Clark, American animator and film director (Disney Studios), (d. 1979).

=== December ===
- December 20:
  - Al Rinker, American musician (The Aristocats), (d. 1982).
  - Paul Francis Webster, American lyricist (wrote the theme from Spider-Man), (d. 1984).
- December 25: Cab Calloway, American jazz singer and dancer (voiced singing characters in the Betty Boop shorts Minnie the Moocher, Snow-White, Old Man of the Mountain), (d. 1994).

=== Specific date unknown ===
- Frank Little, American animator and comics artist (Terrytoons), (d. 1997).
- Wan Dihuan, Chinese animator, pioneer of the Chinese animation industry (Princess Iron Fan, Havoc in Heaven).

== Sources ==
- Kinney, Jack, Walt Disney and other assorted characters - An unauthorised account of the early years at Disney's, Harmony Books, New York, 1988
- Litten, Frederick S. (2013). "Shōtai kenkyū nōto: Nihon no eigakan de jōei sareta saisho no (kaigai) animēshon eiga ni tsuite" 招待研究ノート：日本の映画館で上映された最初の（海外）アニメーション映画について [On the Earliest (Foreign) Animation Shown in Japanese Cinemas]. The Japanese Journal of Animation Studies (in Japanese). 15 (1A): 27–32.
- Litten, Frederick S. (17 June 2014). "Japanese color animation from ca. 1907 to 1945" (PDF). litten.de. Archived from the original (PDF) on 14 July 2014.
- Matsumoto, Natsuki (2011). "映画渡来前後の家庭用映像機器" [Home movie equipment from the earliest days of film in Japan]. In Iwamoto, Kenji (ed.). Nihon eiga no tanjō 日本映画の誕生 [Birth of Japanese film] (in Japanese). Shinwa-sha. pp. 95–128. ISBN 978-4-86405-029-6.
