= The Camel's Dance =

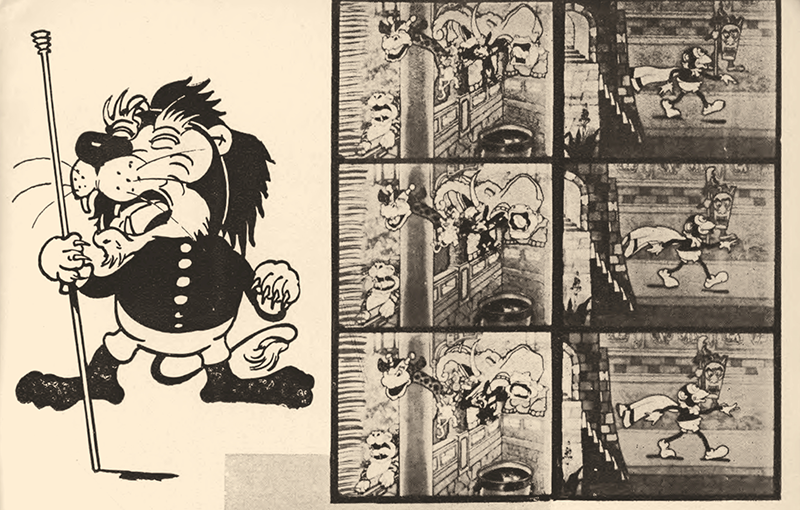
- Preserved frames from the film
- Directed by: Wan Laiming; Wan Guchan; Wan Chaochen
- Produced by: Wan Laiming; Wan Guchan; Wan Chaochen
- Release date: 1935
- Country: China

The Camel's Dance (traditional Chinese: 駱駝獻舞; simplified Chinese: 骆驼献舞; pinyin: Luòtuo Xiànwǔ) is a black and white Chinese animation made in 1935 by three of the Wan brothers. It is considered the first animation with sound in China.

== History ==
The segment is believed to be a technological showcasing of sound from an animation clip. It is unknown if the sound was just music or actual words spoken. The title can also be translated as "Camel Presenting a Dance".

== See also ==
- History of Chinese Animation
- Chinese Animation
