= Great Wall Studio =

Great Wall Studio or Changcheng Studio may refer to:

- Great Wall Film Company, Shanghai
- Great Wall Movie Enterprises, Hong Kong
