= Shuzhendong Chinese Typewriter =

1922 film

- Directed by: Wan Laiming; Wan Guchan
- Produced by: Wan Laiming; Wan Guchan
- Release date: 1922
- Running time: Unknown
- Country: China

Shuzhendong Chinese Typewriter (simplified Chinese: 舒振东华文打字机; traditional Chinese: 舒振東華文打字機; pinyin: Shūzhèngdōng Huáwén Dǎzìjī) is the first Chinese animation ever made, created in 1922 by Wan Laiming and Wan Guchan.

== Translations ==
There are two possible translations. The first translation is "Comfortably Raised Eastern Chinese Typewriter", likely a generic marketing name.

The second translation may be "Comfortable Zhendong Chinese Typewriter", as in the town of Zhendong (振东) in the Binhai county located in the Jiangsu province. Zhendong happens to be directly north of Shanghai, where the pioneering Wan brothers were doing animation experiments at the time.

== History ==
The black and white advertisement was created for the Shanghai Commercial Press (商务印书馆). It was a printing establishment set up in 1902. By 1919, the Wan brothers were experimenting with animation technologies from the United States, and this commercial piece is the first known animation with a practical use outside their research.

== See also ==
- History of Chinese Animation
- Chinese Animation
