= Dog Treat =

1924 film

- Directed by: Huang Wennong
- Produced by: Huang Wennong
- Release date: 1924
- Running time: Unknown
- Country: China

Dog Treat (Chinese: 狗請客) is a lost black and white Chinese animation made in 1924 by Huang Wennong.

== Translations ==
The translation comes out to "Dog treating guests" or "Dog entertaining guests". It does not translate to "Dog food".

== History ==
It is a cartoon short produced under the "Chinese film company" (中華影片公司). Since no other productions were ever made by this company, it is unknown as to whether it is actually a legitimate corporation. The purpose of this clip is also up for debate, since it can either be in the form of an advertisement or animation experiment.

== See also ==
- History of Chinese Animation
- Chinese Animation
