= Why Is the Crow Black-Coated =

Why is the Crow Black-Coated
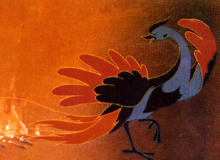
- 乌鸦为什么是黑的
- Directed by: Qian Jiajun; Li Keruo
- Written by: Liu Quan
- Produced by: Wan Laiming; Wan Guchan
- Cinematography: Duan Xiaoxuan
- Production company: Shanghai Animation Film Studio
- Release date: 1956
- Running time: 10 minutes
- Country: China

Why Is the Crow Black-Coated (Chinese: 乌鸦为什么是黑的; pinyin: Wūyā Wèi Shénme Shì Hēide) is the first Chinese animation short film in color produced at the Shanghai Animation Film Studio by Wan Laiming and Wan Guchan.

== Plot ==
The story is about a very arrogant bird that enjoys life. He sang and danced in the forest in China, showing off his beautiful tail to everyone. Autumn would come and the other animals in the forest are busy preparing food for the winter. The bird continues to live life leisurely.

The winter would come instantly with a heavy snow storm. The bird is now homeless in the cold without preparation. To warm up, he found a random wild fire in the forest. The bird accidentally burned his tail and also lost his singing voice. From there on, the bird is no longer beautiful and is known as the black crow.

== Creators ==
English Production	Original Version	Romanized	Crew
Screenwriter	編導	Yifan	一凡
Directors	導演	Li Kewei; Qian Jiajun	李克弱 钱家骏
Design	設計	Liu Fengzhan; Shang Shishun; Thunderstorm	刘凤展 尚世顺 雷雨
Animation	动画	Lu Qing	陆青

== Background ==
Two of the Wan brothers took part in the production. The film was created right before Shanghai Animation Film Studio became a government sponsored division which would later be affected by the Cultural Revolution under Mao Zedong.

== Awards ==
It is the first Chinese animation to be recognized internationally in 1956 at the Venice Film Festival. In 1957 it was also awarded by China's Ministry of Culture.

== See also ==
- Chinese animation
- History of animation
- History of Chinese animation
