= Pigsy Eats Watermelon =

- Directed by: Wan Laiming; Wan Guchan
- Written by: Bao Lei
- Produced by: Wan Laiming; Wan Guchan
- Cinematography: Chen Zhenghong
- Music by: Wu Yingju
- Production company: Shanghai Animation Film Studio
- Release date: 1958
- Running time: 20 minutes
- Country: China
- Language: Mandarin

Pigsy Eats Watermelon (Chinese: 猪八戒吃西瓜; pinyin: Zhu Bajie Chi Xigua) is a 1958 Chinese animation short film produced at the Shanghai Animation Film Studio by Wan Laiming and Wan Guchan. It is also translated as Mr. Pig Eats Watermelon or Zhu Bajie Eats Watermelon. Wan Guchan innovated a new paper-cut technique and this film was the first to utilize the method.

== Story ==
The main character was Zhu Bajie, the Chinese folklore character from the literature Journey to the West. Though the story was considered more of a spin-off. The character was used, since pigs were often associated with greed in the culture.

== Creators ==
	English	Chinese
Screenplay by	Bao Lei	包蕾
Directed by	Wan Guchan	萬古蟾
Assistant Director and Photography	Chen Zhenghong	陈正鸿
Music by	Wu Yingju	吴应矩
Graphic Design	Zhan Tongxuan; Xie Yougen	詹同渲 谢友根
Choreography	Hu Jinqing; Qian Jiajun; Shen Zuwei; Che Hui	胡进庆 钱家俊 沈祖慰 车慧
