= Go After an Easy Prey =

1948 film

- Directed by: Fong Ming
- Written by: Zhu Dan
- Release date: 1948
- Country: China
- Language: Mandarin

Go After an Easy Prey (Chinese: 瓮中捉鳖) is a Chinese animated film in black and white from 1948. It is also referred to as "Turtle Caught in a Jar".

== Translation ==
The title of the film is a phrase describing something as easy to catch as a turtle. The off English translation may be "shooting fish in a barrel".

== Background ==
The film was produced by the Northeast Film Studio during its transitional phase with the downfall of the puppet government Manchukuo.

== Story ==
The film is believed to be more of a documentary view of China's civil war in the 1940s when Chiang Kai-shek was considered to be favored and aided by U.S imperialism. He was metaphorically described as trapped like a turtle by the People's Liberation Army.
