= Havoc in Heaven =

1961 Chinese animated feature film directed by Wan Laiming

- Theatrical release poster

Chinese name
- Traditional Chinese: 大鬧天宮
- Simplified Chinese: 大闹天宫
- Literal meaning: Wreaking havoc in the Heavenly Palace
Transcriptions
Standard Mandarin
- Hanyu Pinyin: Dà nào tiān gōng
- Directed by: Wan Laiming
- Written by: Li Keruo; Wan Laiming
- Produced by: Wan brothers
- Cinematography: Duan Xiaoxuan; Wang Shirong
- Music by: Wu Yingju
- Production company: Shanghai Animation Film Studio
- Release dates: 1961; 1964
- Running time: 114 minutes (original); 92 minutes (HD remaster)
- Country: China
- Language: Chinese (Mandarin)

Havoc in Heaven (大鬧天宮), also translated as Uproar in Heaven, is a 1961 Chinese donghua feature film directed by Wan Laiming and produced by all four of the Wan brothers. The film was created at the height of the Chinese animation industry in the 1960s, and received numerous awards, earning the brothers domestic and international recognition. The story is an adaptation of the earlier episodes of the 16th-century Chinese novel Journey to the West.

The stylized animation and drums and percussion accompaniment used in this film are heavily influenced by Peking opera traditions.

== Plot ==
The Monkey King fights Nezha in Havoc in Heaven, 1964

The story is based on the Ming Dynasty novel Journey to the West, specifically its early chapters. The main character is Sun Wukong, aka the Monkey King, who rebels against the Jade Emperor of heaven.

=== Part One ===
After a brief prologue showing Sun Wukong being born out of a rock, the first act begins on the Flower and Fruit Mountain with Wukong watching a military parade by his subjects. Delighted with their martial prowess, he decides to put on a display himself but accidentally breaks his royal sword. Annoyed at being unable to find a suitable weapon for himself, Wukong follows an old monkey's suggestion to visit the Dragon King of the Eastern Sea for a possible weapon.

Wukong then dives into the sea and travels to the Dragon King's palace where he asks for a neighborly gift of a weapon. The Dragon King, amused by the arrogance, orders his soldiers to bring progressively heavier weapons, but Wukong dismisses them all as being too light and flimsy. The Dragon King then takes him to a great pillar which was used by the gods to pin down the sea during the great floods. The pillar is in fact the Compliant Golden-Hoop Rod, a magical staff weighing eight tons that can change size and Sun Wukong happily takes the weapon. The Dragon King, not expecting Wukong to actually be able to take the great treasure, demands it back, but Wukong rebukes him, saying that the king should not have offered it if he did not want it taken, then returns to his kingdom.

The Dragon King goes to Heaven and petitions the Jade Emperor for the return of the pillar and to punish Wukong. Li Jing quickly offers to send an army, but Li Changgeng, the God of Venus, suggests that Wukong be given a minor post in Heaven so that he can be kept under close supervision instead. The Emperor agrees to the plan.

Venus travels to the Flower and Fruit Mountain and tricks Wukong saying that he was to be honored with a title and a post in Heaven. Wukong travels to Heaven and is granted the post of "BanHorsePlague", being misled to believe that it is a high-ranking duty. Wukong arrives at the stables and unhappy with the treatment of the horses, sets them loose, letting them roam freely. Wukong is complimented on the improved health and mood of the horses. Shortly afterwards, however, the Superintendent of the Heavenly Stables arrives to inspect the stables and is furious that the horses are free instead of being stabled, and he confronts Wukong, who then realizes that he has been tricked. He easily defeats the Superintendent and returns to the Flower and Fruit Mountain.

The Imperial Court then hears that Wukong has claimed the title of 'Great Sage Equal of Heaven', and the furious Jade Emperor orders Li Jing to capture Wukong. The general sends two of his best soldiers, including this son Nezha, to challenge the Monkey King, but they are defeated easily. Li Jing threatens to return, but Wukong shouts back defiantly that he and his monkeys will be waiting.

=== Part Two ===
An omitted part of the original release shows Li Jing interrupting the Jade Emperor's leisure tour of Heaven, requesting additional troops. Venus interjects, saying that subterfuge is required again and after a short argument, the Jade Emperor agrees to his plan. A short scene of life under the protection of the Monkey King is cut short by the captured Venus being brought to Wukong by monkey soldiers.

The second act opens with the Venus trying to entice Wukong back to Heaven, but the Monkey King is wary, even with Heaven's acceptance of the Monkey King's title. The God makes comments about the Flower and Fruit Mountain, comparing it to the Heavenly Garden, extolling the beauty, scents and fruit compared to earthly delights. Intrigued, Wukong agrees to become the guardian of the Heavenly Peach Orchard, another minor post that he is misled to believe is important. Now assumed to be placated, he is left alone in the Garden where he eats the Queen Mother of the West's peaches of immortality.

A procession of fairies comes to collect peaches for an annual Peach Banquet where they are questioned by Wukong about the banquet's guests. When he hears that all deities had been invited, but not he, Wukong realises he has been tricked again and flies into a rage. The fairies flee, but Wukong stops them with his magic. He goes to the Jade Pool and after putting all the attendants to sleep, begins to sample the food and wine.

The drunken Monkey King suddenly becomes homesick and steals the entire banquet, putting it into a magical bag for his subjects. He then leaves for the Flower and Fruit Mountain but becomes lost due to his drunkenness, ending up at Lao Tzu's palace where he eats the Pills of Immortality meant for the Jade Emperor. The pills sober him up, allowing him to travel home where he is greeted enthusiastically by his monkeys and he opens the bag, allowing his monkeys to enjoy the stolen food.

Meanwhile, the Queen Mother of the west discovers the remains of her Peach Banquet and petitions the Jade Emperor to punish Wukong. The fairies then tearfully inform that Wukong has eaten many of the peaches in the Heavenly Garden. Finally, Lao Tzu comes and tells the Emperor that his Pills of Immortality have been stolen. This time, both Li Jing and Venus recommend military action.

The Heavenly army descends on the Flower and Fruit Mountain, where there is heavy fighting between the soldiers and well trained monkeys. Sun Wukong fights and defeats the Four Heavenly Kings, who use a variety of weapons ranging from to a self dividing sword magical snake. Li Jing then sends in Erlang Shen and a troop of elite soldiers. Wukong uses his magic to make copies of himself and rapidly defeats the soldiers, then engages Erlang in a duel, which includes a memorable shapeshifting fight and Wukong's attempt to evade Erlang by transforming himself into a local deity temple.

Seeing that Erlang and the Monkey King are equally matched, Lao Tzu interferes, knocking Wukong unconscious with his Vajra Bracelet, where he is quickly captured. Wukong is sentenced to death and a guillotine is used, but the blade breaks on the Monkey King's neck. The God of Fire tries to burn Wukong to death, but he simply inhales the flames and exhales them over the god, sending him running away on fire. A shower of golden arrows is then used, but only succeeds in sending Sun Wukong to sleep from boredom.

Lao Tzu suggests incinerating the Monkey King in his Eight-Trigram Furnace, since he is extremely durable due to his earlier consumption of the Pills of Immortality and the peaches. After days of burning Sun Wukong in the furnace, Lao Tzu opens it, expecting to see nothing but ash, but instead sees two glowing lights which he mistakes for two Pills of Immortality. Reaching in, he discovers that they are actually Wukong's eyes, hardened by the time in the furnace rather than weakened. Breaking free, he destroys the furnace then destroys most of the Imperial palace, routs the Imperial guards and causes the Jade Emperor and his two ministers to flee in disarray. Finally triumphant, Wukong returns to the Flower and Fruit Mountain, where he is greeted by his cheering subjects.

== Cast ==
Character	Chinese voice actor	English voice actor
Sun Wukong	Qiu Yuefeng	
Ao Guang	Ke Bi, Chen Kaige	
Jade Emperor	Fu Runsheng	
Tai Bai Jin Xing	Shang Hua	
Storyteller	Hans Alfredson	
孙悟空	Yang Li	

== Production ==
=== Development ===
Wan Guchan, of the Wan Brothers and one of the animators of the feature film Princess Iron Fan, began planning the production of Havoc in Heaven after its release in 1941. However, the project was delayed for over a decade after the Japanese capture of Shanghai during the Second Sino-Japanese War, and later by the Chinese Civil War.

Wan Laiming returned to Shanghai as director of Shanghai Animation Film Studio in 1954, and production of Havoc in Heaven resumed shortly thereafter. The first part of the film was completed in 1961 by Wan Laiming and Wan Guchan. The second part was completed in 1964 with the assistance of Wan Chaochen and Wan Dihuan. Both parts of the film were screened together for the first time in 1965. This was the last major animated film of the Second Golden Era of Cinema of China. A year later, the entire industry was effectively shut down by the Cultural Revolution.

=== Creators ===
	English	Chinese
Screen Adaptation	Li Keruo; Wan Laiming	李克弱 萬籟鳴
Art Direction	Zhang Guangyu	張光宇
Design	Zhang Guangyu	张光宇
Composer	Wu Yingju	吴应炬
Assistant Director	Tang Cheng	唐澄
Art Design	Zhang Guangyu; Zhang Zhengyu	張光宇 張正宇
Animation Design	Pu Jiaxiang; Duan Rui; Lu Qing; Ge Guiyun; Zhang Shiming; Yan Shanchun; Lin Wenxiao; Yang Dingxian; Zhang Guangyu	浦家祥 段睿 陆青 葛桂云 张世明 阎善春 林文肖 严定宪 张光宇
Sketch and Scenery	Fang Pengnian; Gao Yang	方澎年 髙阳
Background Design	Zhang Zhengyu	张正宇
Photography	Wang Shirong; Duan Xiaoxuan	王世荣 段孝萱
Editing	Xu Zhenzhu	许珍珠
Sound	Liang Jinzhun	良金准
Played by	Shanghai Film Symphony Orchestra; Peking Opera Orchestra of Shanghai	上影乐团 上海京剧院乐团
Conducted by	Zhen Zhuangxi; Zhang Xinhai; Wang Youpu	珍莊奚 章鑫海 王有蔔

== Release ==
=== Home media ===
As part of the 40th anniversary of the second part's release, the film was re-released on a 2-disc special edition DVD in 2004. This edition is the original remastered Chinese version of the film, and contains Chinese subtitles in traditional and simplified characters. After much demand, the original 106 minute version was released on a two disc VCD set. It contains several omitted and extended scenes that weren't included on the 40th anniversary version for unknown reasons.

In 2012 the film was restored as well as being converted to 3D. The film's aspect ratio was changed from 1.33 to 1.78 by adding additional art to the backgrounds and at times moving the character placement within the frame. The film was shortened to 90 minutes by "speed[ing] up some of the action scenes." The score and dialogue were re-recorded for a new Dolby 5.1 and 7.1 mix.

=== International ===
Although it was never released in most European countries, it was once broadcast on Swedish television during the mid-1980s with Hans Alfredson, who described scene for scene on what was happening onscreen. It also aired two or three times in the former Soviet Union in the 1980s, and became very popular among the young. It was also shown in Denmark in the 1980s, voiced by Povl Dissing, and in Germany in 1980. It was also broadcast by the BBC in 1980, 1981 and 1983. The version broadcast is a longer edit than that of the 40th Anniversary DVD (approximately 107 minutes) and contains several extended and omitted scenes. In 1981, the movie was presented at the Cannes Film Festival in the "Hors compétition" category.

A fan-restoration project has completed restoring the film to its original length by splicing together several sources of the film (commercial releases and VHS recordings of original broadcasts).

== Influence ==
The name of the movie (大闹天宫) became a colloquialism in the Chinese language to describe someone making a mess. Countless cartoon adaptations that followed have reused the same classic story Journey to the West, yet many consider this 1964 iteration to be the most original, fitting and memorable.

Around the time of its release, the film was also used as a joke metaphor for the "havoc" being caused by Mao Zedong (the monkey) in "heaven" (China), according to pundit Jonathan Clements.

== Sequels and spin-offs ==
At least two loose sequels were produced subsequently:

- 人參果 (Ren Shen Guo) in 1981 - directed by Yan Ding Xian, translated as ''Ginseng Fruit''
- 金猴降妖 (Jinhou jiang yao / Jin hou xiang yao) in 1985 - most commonly translated as The Monkey King Conquers the Demon. Adaptation of the Baigujing story arc.

The film's protagonist makes a cameo appearance in the second episode of the 2014 animated series Super Wings in a form of a theatrical show.

== Awards ==
- Won the outstanding film award at the 1978 International London Film Festival.
- Won the 13th Special Interest award at the Czech Republic Karlovy Vary International Film Festival.
- Won the best art award and children's literature award at the 2nd Chinese film "Hundred Flowers" festival.

== See also ==
- Alakazam the Great
- Calabash Brothers
- History of animation
- History of Chinese animation
- Chinese animation
- List of animated feature films
