= Snow Kid =

- Directed by: Lin Wenxiao
- Distributed by: Shanghai Animation Film Studio
- Release date: 1980
- Running time: 20 mins
- Country: China
- Language: Mandarin

Snow Kid (Chinese: 雪孩子; pinyin: Xuě háizi) is a 1980 Chinese animated film produced by Shanghai Animation Film Studio. It is also referred to as "Snow Child". It was written by Ji Hong and directed by Lín Wénxiāo (林文肖).

== Plot ==
In a cold winter, mother rabbit was going to look for some carrots outside the house. In case her child would feel lonely, she made a snowman for him, which was fabulous. The snowman started to move the moment she left. He had a great time with the little rabbit. But it was getting colder and colder, thus forcing the baby rabbit to go home and make a fire to get warm. Unfortunately, he fell asleep, and when he yawned and stretched his quilt fell on the floor, resulting the house to catch on fire. The snowman saw this and rushed into the room without hesitation. Finally, he rescued his friend — the little rabbit, at the cost of his own life. When the mother rabbit returned, she began to break into tears after the house was burned down but was relieved to find that her son was alive, but the lovely snowkid disappeared forever the two would skate and bid farewell, as snowman goes to the afterlife.

== Creators ==
English Production	Original Version	Crew	Romanized
Screenwriter	编剧	Ji Hong	稽鸿
Director	导演	Lin Wenxiao	林文肖
Modeling Design	造型设计	Chang Guangxi	常光希
Animation Design	动画设计	Lu Qing; Yan Meikun; Pan Jiyao; Fu Feiqing; Yuan Suqin	陆青 邬美坤 潘积耀 傅斐卿 袁素琴
Background Design	背景设计	Fang Pengjian; Jiang Aijian	方彭年 江爱坚
Photography	摄影	Duan Xiaoyu	段孝萱
Composer	作曲	Fuzai Jin	金复载
Singing	演唱	Zhu Fengbo	朱逢博
Conductor	指挥	Wang Yongji	王永吉
Performance	演奏	Shanghai Film Orchestra	上海电影乐团

== Award ==
Won

- 1980 — Best Film Prize from the Chinese Ministry of Culture
