= Uproar in the Studio =

1926 black-and-white Chinese animation short film

- Directed by: Wan Laiming; Wan Guchan
- Produced by: Wan Laiming; Wan Guchan
- Release date: 1926
- Running time: 10-12 minutes
- Country: China

Uproar in the Studio (simplified Chinese: 大闹画室; traditional Chinese: 大鬧畫室; pinyin: Dà nào huashì) is a black and white Chinese animation short made in 1926 by Wan Laiming and Wan Guchan. The short film helped the Wan brothers become recognized as the pioneers of the animation industry in China. The film is now lost.

== Style ==
The film was combined with live footage. It is about an artist working in his studio. Suddenly he is disturbed by a small paper person jumping out of the page causing an uproar. The artist in the footage was Wan Guchan.

== History ==
Uproar in the Studio was created for non-commercial use by the Wan brothers when they were working at the Great Wall Film Company. The animation ran for 10–12 minutes in black and white to showcase the technology.

== Confusion ==
In 1985, Marie-Claire Quiquemelle's essay "The Wan Brothers and 60 years of Animated Film in China" in Festival d'Annecy stated that there are really two separate films produced in 1926. Uproar in the Studio is modeled after the U.S film Out of the Inkwell by Max Fleischer. Another film, Paperman Makes Trouble, is known as 纸人捣乱记 or 一封书信寄回来 in the original Chinese. The story has to do with the paper person receiving a letter. Because the contents are so similar, there is a lot of confusion concerning the two.

It is believed the younger Wan brother's studio was bombed as part of the January 28 incident.

== See also ==
- History of Chinese Animation
- Chinese Animation
