= Princess Iron Fan (1941 film) =

1941 animated film

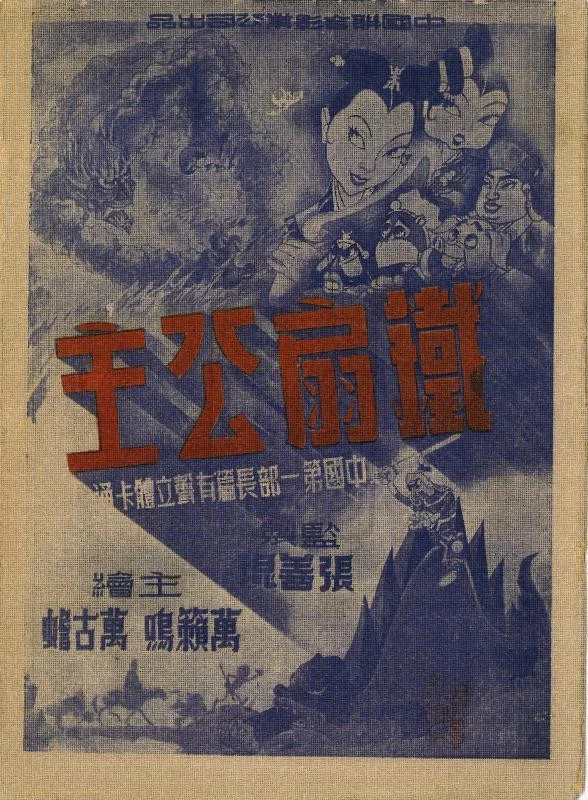
- Film poster
- Directed by: Wan Guchan; Wan Laiming
- Written by: Wang Qianbai
- Produced by: Wan Guchan; Wan Laiming; Zhang Shankun
- Edited by: Wang Jinyi
- Music by: Lu Chongren
- Distributed by: United China Film Company
- Release date: 19 November 1941 (China)
- Running time: 73 minutes
- Country: China
- Language: Chinese

Princess Iron Fan (traditional Chinese: 鐵扇公主; simplified Chinese: 铁扇公主; pinyin: Tiě shàn gōngzhǔ), is the first full-length Chinese animated feature film. It is also considered the first Asian animated feature film. The film is based on an episode of the 16th-century novel Journey to the West. It was directed in Shanghai under difficult conditions in the thick of World War II by Wan Guchan and Wan Laiming (the Wan brothers) and was released on 19 November 1941.

The film later became influential in the development of Japanese animation. Its circulation in wartime Japan helped inspire the production of Momotarō's Sea Eagles (1943) and Momotarō's Divine Sea Warriors, and later influenced Osamu Tezuka's creation of Astro Boy (1963).

== Plot ==
The story was liberally adapted from a short sequence in the popular Chinese novel Journey to the West. Princess Iron Fan is a main character.

Specifically, the film starts with Princess Iron Fan initially refusing to lend the fan because Monkey had previously subdued her son, Red Boy. Monkey first tries to defeat her directly, but she blows him away with the fan. He later transforms himself into a small insect and enters her stomach, forcing her to surrender the fan. The conflict expands when Bull Demon King, Princess Iron Fan’s husband, becomes involved. With the help of local villagers, Tripitaka’s disciples eventually subdue Bull Demon King, obtain the fan, extinguish the fire, and resume their journey to the west.

== Production ==
The full film

The Wan family twins Wan Laiming and Wan Guchan, with their brothers Wan Chaochen and Wan Dihuan, were the first animators in China. After the release of their first "real" cartoon, Uproar in the Studio (1926), they continued to dominate China's animation industry for the next several decades. In the late 1930s, with Shanghai under Japanese occupation, they began work on China's first feature-length animated film. In 1939, the Wan brothers saw Snow White and the Seven Dwarfs and set the standard in attempting to create a film of equal quality for the nation's honor.

Wan Laiming and Wan Guchan returned to the unoccupied International Settlement and French Concession of Shanghai (known as Orphan/Solitary Island) in April 1939 and produced Tieshan gongzhu/Princess Iron Fan (1941), the first animated feature film in Asia. It became an instant hit and traveled to many other countries. The animators worked with extremely limited resources, including a shortage of film stock, animation equipment, and financial support, as much of the country was engulfed in conflict. reflecting both the ambition and the technical limitations of China's fledgling animation industry at the time.

The film took three years, 237 artists and 350,000 yuan to make. Rotoscoping was used extensively to save money, and the eyes of the live actors are often visible in the faces of the animated characters.

By 1940, the film would render past 20,000 frames, using up more than 200 thousand pieces of paper (400 reams of 500 pieces each). They shot over 18,000 ft (5,500 m) of footage. And the final piece would contain 7,600 ft (2,300 m) of footage which can be shown in 80 minutes. The Wan brothers also invited the following actors and actresses for sound dubbing: Bai Hong (白虹), Yan Yueling (严月玲), Jiang Ming (姜明), Han Langen (韩兰根), and Yin Xiucen (殷秀岑). At the time, they were at the Xinhua Film Company animation department since it was the only remaining production company left during the period of the Japanese occupation. Sheng Pihua, the head of Shangyuanyin Company, help financed the film.

Princess Iron Fan became the first animated feature film to be made in China. The movie was made to create an Indigenous Chinese princess that is based on folklore. Upon completion, the film was screened by the Chinese Union Film Company.

== Crew ==
- Producer: S.K Chang (Zhang Shankun) (張善琨)
- Screenwriter: Wang Qianbai (王乾白)
- Screenwriting Consultant: Chen Yiqing (陳翼青)
- Sound Recordist: Liu Enze (劉恩澤)
- Musical Director: Huang Yijun (黃貽鈞)
- Musical Consultant: Zhang Zhengfan (章正凡)
- Composer: Lu Chongren (陸仲任)
- Sound Effects: Chen Zhong (陳中)
- Editor: Wang Jinyi (王金義)
- Printers: Xu Hexiang (許荷香), Lin Xiangfu (林祥富), Chen Xinyu (陳鑫甫)
- Designers: Chen Qifa (陳啟發), Fei Boyi (費伯夷)
- Photographers: Liu Guangxing (劉廣興), Chen Zhengfa (陳正發), Zhou Jiarang (周家讓), Shi Fengqi (石鳳岐), Sun Feixia (孫緋霞)
- Background Artists: Cao Xu (曹旭), Chen Fangqian (陳方千), Tang Tao (唐濤), Fan Manyun (范曼雲)
- Illustrators: Yu Yiru (俞翼如), Li Yi (李毅), Liu Wenjie (劉文頡), Wu Guang (吳光), Yin Fusheng (殷復生), Chen Jintao (陳錦濤), Xie Minyan (謝敏燕), Liu Chenfei (劉嗔非), Zhao Fengshi (趙逢時), Zhu Yong (朱湧), Liu Yimeng (劉軼蒙), Shen Youming (沈叩鳴), Hu Sixiao (胡斯孝), Guo Ruisheng (郭瑞生), Wu Yan (吳焱), Jin Fangbin (金方斌), Cao Zhong (曹忠), Zhang Danian (張大年)
- Line Drawers: Chen Min (陳民), Wu Minfa (吴民發), Sun Xiuping (孫修平), Yu Wenjun (俞文鋆), Wu Yueting (吳悅庭), Huang Zhenwen (黃振文), Lu Zhongbo (陸仲柏), Dai Jue (戴覺), Ye Lingyun (葉凌雲), Zhang Liangqin (章亮欽), Sun Song (孫松), Guo Hengyi (郭恆義), Yuan Yongqing (袁永慶), Shen Ruihe (沈瑞鶴), Chen Jinfan (陳錦範), Zhang Jutang (張菊堂), Fang Pinying (方品英), Yu Zupeng (俞祖鵬), Sheng Liangxian (盛亮賢), Shen Zhongxia (沈忠俠), Tang Yude (唐秉德), Lu Guangyi (陸光儀), Zhang Tan (張談), Zhu Shunlin (朱順麟), Ding Baoguang (丁竇光), Shi Fakang (石發康), Zhao Shengzai (趙盛哉), Qin Qixian (欽其賢), Yang Jinxin (楊錦新), Feng Bofu (馮伯富)
- Color Artists: Yuan Huimin (袁慧敏), Weng Huanbo (翁煥伯), Ge Yongliang (戈永良), Wang Zengting (王增庭), Wang Congzhou (王從周), Quan Han (全漢), Lin Kezhen (林可珍), Li Shifen (李世芬), Mi Longnian (宓龍年), Yuan Yuyao (袁玉瑤), Yuan Zichuan (袁子傳), Xu Huifen (許惠芬), Zou Guiying (鄒桂英), Xu Huilan (許蕙蘭), Chen Huiying (陳慧英), Cai Yongfa (蔡永發), Dai Keshu (戴克淑), Dai Kehui (戴克惠), Luo Zong (羅粽)
- Lead Artists: Wan Laiming (萬籟鳴), Wan Guchan (萬古蟾)

== Soundtrack ==
The original soundtrack was composed by Lu Chong-Ren (1911-2011), a well-known folk music composer. Scholars have praised the soundtrack for incorporating and adapting Chinese folk elements, although some modern listeners might perceive it as excessively gestural and action-driven, akin to early Tom and Jerry cartoons.

== Influences ==
Initially, the film was a major success upon its release in December 1941 in Shanghai, running for a record-breaking one and a half months. Subsequently, it was also shown in Hong Kong, South Asia, and Japan. Despite its popularity, the Japanese military banned the film from being shown in Japan due to its wartime themes and rhetoric.

Princess Iron Fan inspired the 16-year-old Osamu Tezuka to become a comics artist and prompting the Japanese Navy to commission Japan's own first feature-length animated film, 1945's Momotaro's Divine Sea Warriors (the earlier film Momotaro's Sea Eagles is three minutes shy of being feature-length).

The film marked an important development in Chinese animation, demonstrating that the medium could serve purposes beyond entertainment. Produced during the Second Sino-Japanese War, it incorporated themes of national resistance and reflected the filmmakers' belief that animation could contribute to the broader project of national salvation. Though its production was shaped by wartime hardships, the film demonstrated the viability of animation as a serious cinematic form in China and helped initiate what would become a distinct tradition of Chinese animation.

== Artistic styles ==
A Chinese landscape painting method known as Ink Wash painting, which flourished throughout the Sui and Tang Dynasty from the sixth to the ninth century and is still in use today, is the inspiration for Princess Iron Fan's visual aesthetic.

In addition to traditional Chinese artistic styles, the Wans also cultivated a unique style that set their work apart. They used galloping rich imagery, and bright, colorful, and expressive techniques of bold exaggeration. This style can be considered as: pursuing personal initiative, individual inclination, thought and fantasy, and form and content.

== See also ==
- History of Animation
- History of Chinese Animation
- Chinese Animation
- List of animated feature films
- List of films in the public domain in the United States
