= Three Monks =

1981 Chinese animated film

- Directed by: A Da
- Written by: Bao Lei
- Cinematography: You Yong
- Music by: Jin Fuzai
- Production company: Shanghai Animation Film Studio
- Release date: 1 January 1981
- Running time: 20 minutes
- Country: China

Three Monks (Chinese: 三个和尚; pinyin: Sān gè héshàng), also translated as The Three Buddhist Priests, is a Chinese animated short film produced by the Shanghai Animation Film Studio (SAFS). After the end of the Cultural Revolution in 1976, the film was one of the first animations created as part of the rebirth period. It won the Silver Bear for Best Short Film at the 32nd Berlin International Film Festival.

== Plot ==
A young Buddhist monk lives a simple life on a hilltop temple. He has one daily task of hauling two buckets of water up the hill using a carrying pole. One day, a skinny monk arrives. The young monk tries to share the job with the skinny monk, but the carry pole is only long enough for one bucket. They therefore decide to carry one bucket in the center of the pole, together. However, when they traverse the hill, the bucket shifts from one end to another, leading to uneven weight distribution; this results in an argument between the two. The problem is settled when the two monks measure the exact center of the pole and keep the bucket in position. A few days later, a fat monk joins them. The fat monk drinks all the water upon his arrival, and is told to fetch more water by himself. The fat monk brings up more water, but once again drinks it all. At this point, everyone expects the others to take on the chore, and consequently, no one fetches water despite their thirst. One night, a scrounging rat knocks over a candleholder, leading to a devastating fire in the temple. The three desperate monks finally unite and mount a concerted effort to put out the fire. By the end of the ordeal, they recognize the importance of unity and begin to live a harmonious life. The three monks create a pulley system to fetch water together with ease, while ensuring the temple never lacks water again.

== Production ==
SAFS director A Da first came up with the idea for Three Monks in 1978 after overhearing a conversation at a party which involved the ancient Chinese proverb, "One monk will shoulder two buckets of water, two monks will share the load, but add a third and no one will want to fetch water." He was reminded that this phenomenon continued to be prevalent in modern times, and would be an interesting subject for animation. A Da relayed his ideas to screenwriter Bao Lei, who came up with a script with no dialogue, but was humorous and emphasized the character's actions.

The film does not contain any dialogue, allowing it to be watched by any culture, and a different music instrument was used to signify each monk.

== Crew ==
- Director: Xu Jingda (A Da)
- Screenwriter: Bao Lei
- Cinematography: You Yong
- Animation: Han Yu, Ma Kexuan, Fan Madi
- Music: Jin Fuzai

== Awards ==
- Won the outstanding film award at China's Ministry of Culture.
- Won the Best animated film prize at the 1st Golden Rooster Awards in 1981.
- Won four international awards including a Silver Bear for Best Short Film at the 32nd Berlin International Film Festival in 1982.
