= Great Wall Film Company =

Chinese film production company

Great Wall Film Company (simplified Chinese: 长城画片公司; traditional Chinese: 長城畫片公司; pinyin: Chángchéng huàpiàn gōngsī) was one of the first Chinese film production companies based in Shanghai, China, in the 1920s.

== History ==
The company was founded by Mei Xuechou (梅雪俦) and Liu Zhaoming (刘兆明) in the 1920s.

The company's first known film was The Discarded Wife (1924), written by Hou Yao and co-directed by Hou and Li Zeyuan. The cartoon Uproar in the Studio was the first known cartoon short released for non-commercial in China in 1926 when the Wan brothers was working for the company. The segment helped them become recognized as animation pioneers in China. The last known production by the company was in 1930.

== Productions ==
1. The Discarded Wife (弃妇) (1924)
2. The Star-Plucking Girl (摘星之女) (1925)
3. The Love's Dream (春闺梦里人)1903)
4. Cupid's Puppets (爱神的玩偶) (1925)
5. Unlucky Double (苦乐鸳鸯) (1926)
6. The Country Maid (乡姑娘) (1920)
7. The Hypocrite (伪君子) (1926)
8. Close a Rift (情天终补) (1926)
9. Uproar in the Studio (大闹画室) (1926)
10. A Pearl Necklace (一串珍珠) (1926)
11. Bloodshed on Mandarin Duck Mansion (武松血溅鸳鸯楼) (1927)
12. Cuiping Mountain (石秀杀嫂) (1927)
13. Hate of an Arrow (一箭仇) (1927)
14. (一封书信寄回来) (1927)
15. (黄天霸) (1927)
16. The Date of Ne Zha's Birth (哪吒出世) (1927)
17. At the End of Her Rope (浪女穷途) (1927)
18. The Mountain of Fire (火焰山) (1928)
19. Huang Tianba Looks for a Wife (黄天霸招亲) (1928)
20. Gan Fengchi (大侠甘凤池) (1928)
21. Speders Group (蜘蛛党) (1928)
22. Real&Fake Monkey King (真假孙行者) (1928)
23. Strange Knight (渔叉怪侠) (1928)
24. Evil's Shadow (妖光侠影) (1928)
25. A Plum with Him (侠盗一枝梅) (1929)
26. Tiger from Fengyang (凤阳老虎) (1929)
27. An Official's Love Story (风流督军) (1929)
28. My Son Was A Hero (儿子英雄) (1929)
29. A Clever Fool (聪明笨伯) (1929)
30. A Mess in Film Studio (大闹摄影场) (1929)
31. Heroine from the South (江南女侠) (1930)

== See also ==
- Cinema of China
- List of Chinese Production Companies (Pre-Communist)
