= Wan Dihuan =

Wan Dihuan (Chinese: 万涤寰; born 1907, date of death unknown) was a Chinese filmmaker. Born in Nanjing, China, he was one of the Wan brothers who pioneered the Chinese animation industry. His date of birth is unknown.

== History ==
Wan Dihuan assisted his brothers in pioneering many of the film projects up until 1932, when he voluntarily left the Great Wall Film Company for his own photography studio. It is unknown as to whether he succeeded in starting the studio, since the Second Sino-Japanese War would take shape by 1937. It is believed that he only came back in 1941 to assist with Princess Iron Fan and 1964 Havoc in Heaven.
