= Wan Laiming =

Chinese animator

- Born: Wan Laiming; January 18, 1900; Nanjing, Qing dynasty, China
- Died: October 7, 1997 (aged 97); Shanghai, China
- Occupations: animator artist inventor film director

Wan Laiming (simplified Chinese: 万籁鸣; traditional Chinese: 萬籟鳴; pinyin: Wàn Làimíng; 18 January 1900 – 7 October 1997) was a Chinese animator. He was one of the Wan brothers who pioneered the Chinese animation industry, and is commonly considered as China's first animator. As the director of the Shanghai Animation Film Studio, he would raise the standard to International level before other historical events affected the industry.

== Early history ==
Wan Laiming and Wan Guchan were twin brothers. They were the first ones to experiment with primitive film technology adapted from the United States and other parts of the world, and were often inspired by foreign cartoons that made it to Shanghai. In 1919 they worked in the fine art departments at Shanghai Commercial Press. They were exposed to early technologies like zoetrope with galloping horses that animate on rotation. Other cinema techniques like zoetrope projection principles were being studied.

In the early 1920s on a summer evening, the brothers were squeezed into a small attic. They used a thick book and drew pictures of a cat and mouse. They bent the corners in such a way that it animated the cat catching the mouse. The brothers would spend their days testing and experimenting.

== Achievements ==
In 1922 they made the first cartoon short Shuzhendong Chinese Typewriter which was a commercial used for the Commercial Press. At the time one of their first technological challenges was to make the background expose. Their technique caused grease that prevented them from seeing anything but simple lines in the background.

In 1924 they were invited to the Great Wall Film Company (長城畫片公司) to try and animate a film under studio terms. Wan Laiming and Wan Guchan were then recognized as China's animation pioneers when they successfully produced the first animation short Uproar in the Studio running 10 to 12 minutes long in black and white. By 1932 one of the Wan brothers, Wan Dihuan, would voluntarily leave the Great Wall Film company for his own photography studio. By 1935 the Wan Brothers would launch the first animation with sound titled The Camel's Dance.

In 1938 the remaining 3 Wan Brothers moved from Shanghai to Wuhan. Later Wan Dihuan went back to Chongqing to launch anti-Japanese animation campaigns. Wan Laiming was also at the Chinese anti-Japanese National Film association as part of the leftist movement. From here they would combine war songs into animations to produce propaganda materials for the Second Sino-Japanese War.

In 1939 the brothers were inspired by the American production Snow White. They would set the standard in attempting to create a film of equal quality for the nation's honor. By 1940 the brothers would be part of the Xinhua Film Company animation department since it was the only remaining production company left during the Japanese occupancy period. The manager of the company Zhang Shankun wanted to invest in profitable films, and he later found how much animation expenses were and wanted to give up. He sought additional investments, but insisted the production would take too much time. Wan Laiming guaranteed that they would not lose money. Though at the time the city was considered a "Solitary Island" since it was semi-occupied by Japanese forces as part of the Second Sino-Japanese War. Princess Iron Fan, the first Chinese animation of notable length, would be complete and shown as a proud achievement to some of the remaining people who haven't left the city. Wan Guchan wanted to draw a plan for the next project Havoc in Heaven. As the Japanese occupation was increasing, Hsinhua comic department has already been forced to close. As a result, the investors withdrew their money and nothing got started. Time would pass and the Shanghai Animation Film Studio would be established in 1950.

In 1954 Wan Laiming went to Hong Kong and returned to Shanghai by autumn of the same year. He then served as the director of the Shanghai Animation Film Studio. Two years later in 1956, Wan Laiming would create the first animation in color Why is the Crow Black-Coated.

It became a reality in 1961 when Wan Laiming and Wan Guchan finally had the opportunity to work on the 1st part of the animation film Havoc in Heaven. By 1964 all 4 Wan brothers were collaborating for the last part of the film. The movie would win International awards officially putting China on the map in terms of a nation capable of producing high quality animation films.

Unfortunately by 1966 Mao Zedong would start the Cultural Revolution. The animation industry would take a nose dive as many artists were affected in the industry. It was then that China's golden era of animated film would end.

== Death ==
On 7 October 1997 Wan Laiming died in Shanghai. He was buried at (福寿园钟灵苑) and a statue of him was erected in honour of his achievements in the industry.
