= Wan Chaochen =

Chinese animator

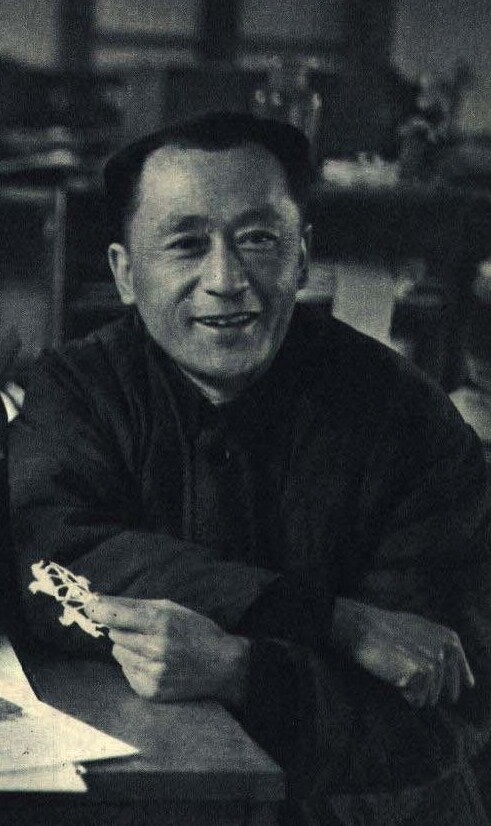
Wan in 1962

Wan Chaochen (Chinese: 万超尘; 1906–1992) was born in Nanjing, China. He was one of the Wan brothers who pioneered the Chinese animations industry.

== History ==
He joined his other brothers Wan Laiming in most of the animation projects that came after the experimentations.
