= Wan brothers =

20th-century animators

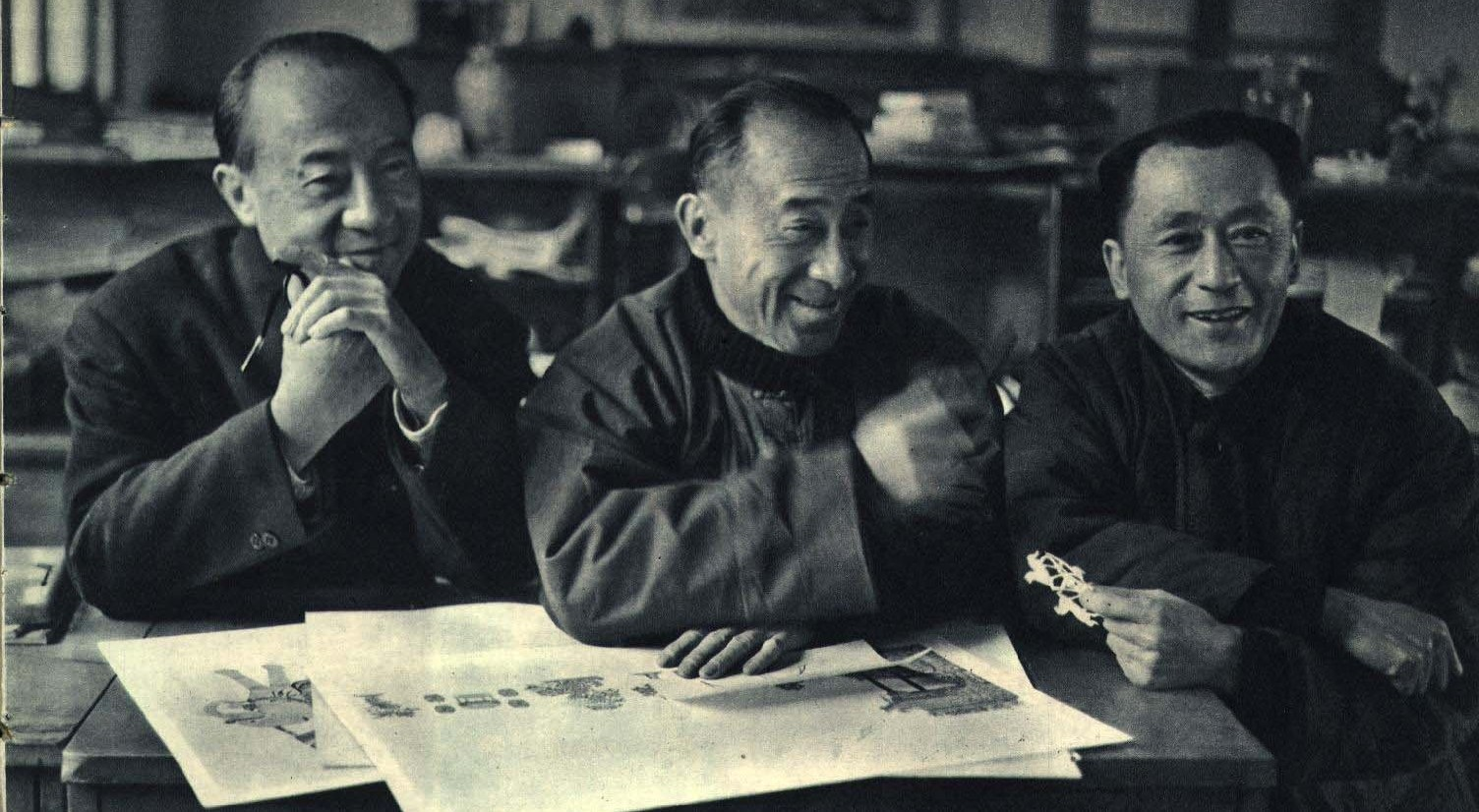
3 of the Wan brothers: GuChan, Laiming, and ChaoChen.

The Wan Brothers (Chinese: 萬氏兄弟) were 20th century animators born in Nanjing, China. They became the founders and pioneers of the Chinese animation industry and made the first Asian animation feature-length film, Princess Iron Fan in 1941.

== Background ==
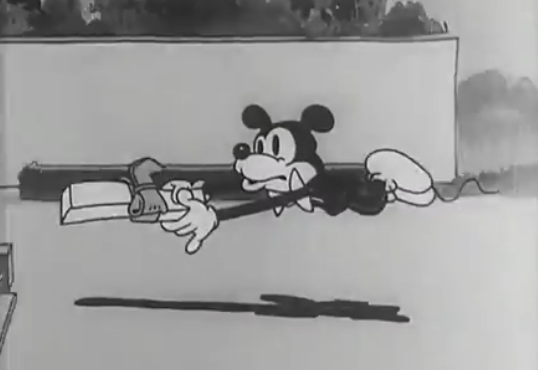
Character in the animated sequence in "Scenes of City Life" (1935)

The era in which the Wan brothers operated was a rather challenging one for building an industry. The brothers lived through the Second Sino-Japanese War, World War II and the Cultural Revolution. They also made the famous cartoon animation, Havoc in Heaven.

== The brothers ==
| English name | Chinese name | Born | Died |
|---|---|---|---|
| Wan Laiming | 萬籟鳴 | January 18, 1900 | October 7, 1997 |
| Wan Guchan | 萬古蟾 | January 18, 1900 | November 19, 1995 |
| Wan Chaochen | 萬超塵 | 1906 | October 28, 1992 |
| Wan Dihuan | 萬滌寰 | 1907 | 1990 |

== Parents ==
Their father was in the silk business. Their mother was a seamstress.

== See also ==
- Chinese animation
- History of Chinese animation
