= Wan Guchan =

Chinese filmmaker

Wan Guchan

Wan Guchan (simplified Chinese: 万古蟾; traditional Chinese: 萬古蟾; pinyin: Wàn Gǔchán; 18 January 1900 – 19 November 1995) was a Chinese filmmaker. Born in Nanjing, Jiangsu, he was one of the Wan brothers who pioneered the Chinese animations industry.

== Career ==
Wan Guchan joined his twin brother Wan Laiming in most of the animation projects and experimentations.

== Achievements ==
Throughout his career, Wan Guchan would be the closest to Wan Laiming in assisting him in all major projects. In 1958, he would be credited as the innovator of a new paper-cut method. The technique was demonstrated in the animation Pigsy Eats Watermelon.

Wan Guchan would also take part in the 1964 film Havoc in Heaven, which would bring China recognition internationally.

== Filmography ==
- Renshen Wawa (1962)
- Jinse de hailuo (1963)
