= Mr. Black =

Mr. Black or Mr Black may refer to:

== Television ==
- Mr. Black (TV series), an Australian television comedy series
- Mr. Black, a character from the 2005 animated television series Johnny Test
- Mr. Black, an evil one-time character from the episode of The Simpsons, "Kamp Krusty"
- Black Cat Detective (also known as Mr. Black), a Chinese animated TV series

== Other uses ==
- Mr. Black: Green Star, a 2015 animated film from China based on the Black Cat Detective TV series
- Mr. Black, an unseen character in the game Grand Theft Auto: Vice City

== See also ==
- Black (surname)
- Mr. Black Mr. White, a 2008 feature film in Hindi
- Goodbye Mr. Black, a 2016 television series from South Korea based on the manhwa of the same title
- Dr. Black, Mr. Hyde, a 1976 blaxploitation horror film loosely inspired by the novella Strange Case of Dr Jekyll and Mr Hyde by Robert Louis Stevenson
- "The Reverend Mr. Black", a song from 1963 by Billy Edd Wheeler, Mike Stoller, and Jerry Leiber
