= The Deer's Bell =

- Directed by: Wu Qiang; Tang Cheng
- Written by: Hu Sang
- Cinematography: Duan Xiaoxuan
- Production company: Shanghai Animation Film Studio
- Distributed by: Anchor Bay Films; 80 Films
- Release date: 1 December 1982
- Running time: 20 minutes
- Country: China
- Language: Mandarin

The Deer's Bell (Chinese: 鹿铃) is a 1982 Chinese animated film produced by Shanghai Animation Film Studio. It is also referred to as Bell on a Deer and Lu Ling. To make the film, the ink wash animation technique was used.

== Plot ==
An old man and his granddaughter rescue an injured young deer. The girl and the young deer develop a close relationship. After the recovery, the deer returns to the wild. Feeling sad, the girl puts a bell on the deer. Disappearing into the mountain valley, the deer's bell continues to echo.

== Awards ==
- The film won best animation in the 1983 Golden Rooster Awards.
- Awarded the best fine arts piece prize in 1983 by China's Ministry of Culture.
- Won the outstanding movie prize at the 13th Moscow International Film Festival animated cartoon special prize in 1982.
