= Silver Bear for Best Short Film =

Award presented annually by the Berlin International Film Festival

Silver Bear for the Best Short Film
- Silberner Bär (German)
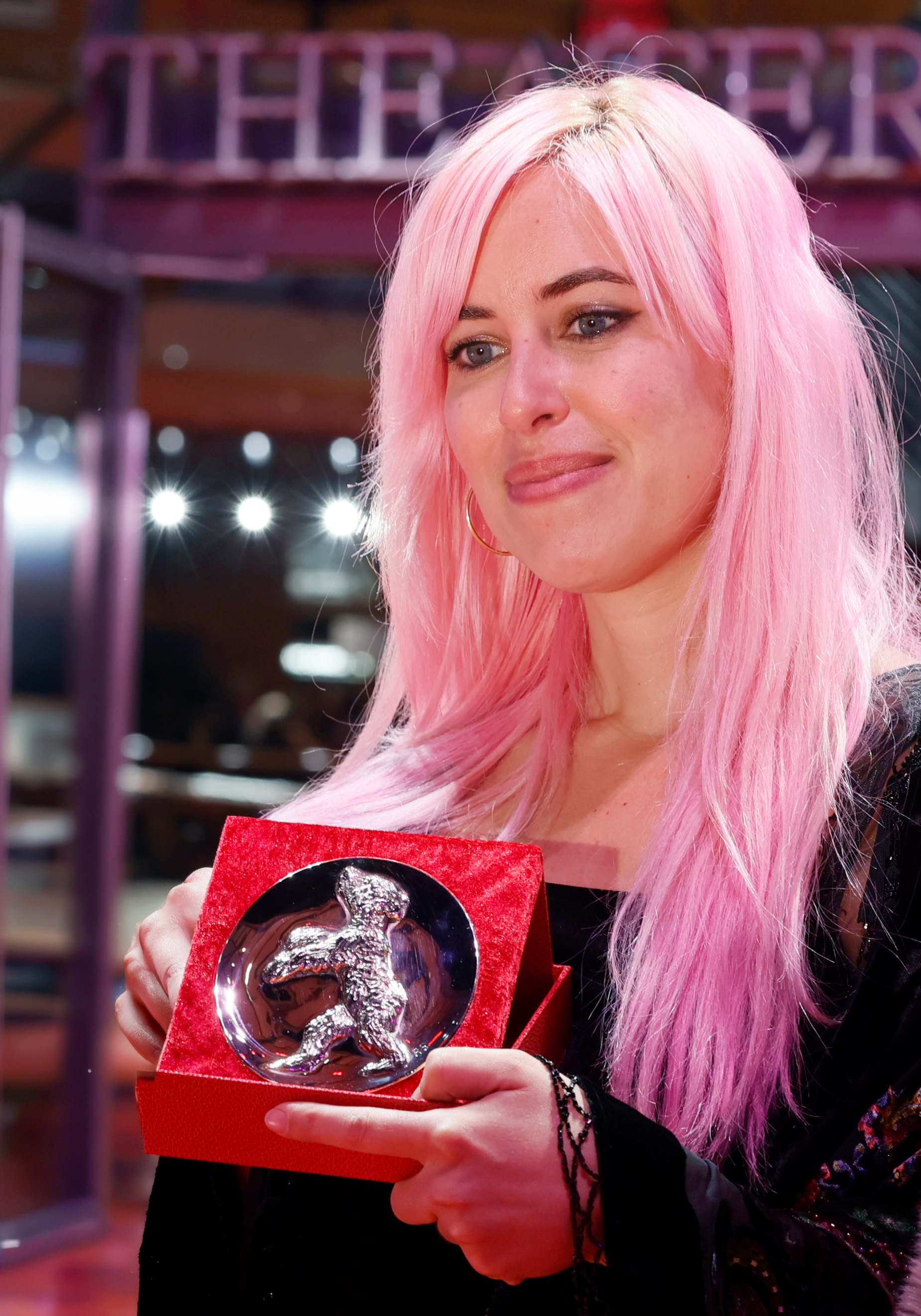
- 2026 recipient: Fanny Texier
- Location: Berlin
- Country: Germany
- Presented by: Berlin International Film Festival
- First award: 1956
- Winner: A Woman's Place is Everywhere by Fanny Texier (2026)
- Website: www.berlinale.de

The Silver Bear for the Best Short Film is the second most prestigious prize awarded in the short films competition at the Berlin International Film Festival.

== Winners ==
=== 1950s ===
Year	English title	Original title	Director(s)	Production country
1956	Rythmetic		Norman McLaren	Canada
1957	Plitvicka jezera		Dragoslav Holub	Yugoslavia
1958	Glas		Bert Haanstra	Netherlands
1959	Das Knalleidoskop		Herbert Hunger	West Germany

=== 1960s ===
Year	English title	Original title	Director(s)	Production country
1960	Diario		Juan Berend	Argentina
1961	Chimichimito		José Martín	Venezuela
1962	Le grand Magal de Touba		Blaise Senghor	Senegal
1963	Tori		Erkko Kivikoski	Finland
1964	Sunday Lark		Sanford Semel	United States
1965	Een zondag op het eiland van de Grande Jatte		Frans Weisz	Netherlands
1966	Rosalie		Walerian Borowczyk	France
1967	Fleá Ceoil		Louis Marcus	Ireland
1968	Krek		Borivoj Dovniković-Bordo	Yugoslavia
1969	Presadjivanje osecanja		Dejan Djurković	Yugoslavia

=== 1970s ===
Year	English title	Original title	Director(s)	Production country
1971	Il continuo		Vlatko Gilić	Yugoslavia
1972	The Selfish Giant		Peter Sander	Canada
1973	1501 1/2		Paul B. Price	United States
1975	SSS		Václav Bedřich	Czechoslovakia
1976	Trains		Caleb Deschanel	United States
1977	Etuda o zkousce		Evald Schorm	Czechoslovakia
1978	Une vieille soupière		Michel Longuet	France
1979	Phantom		René Perraudin and Uwe Schrader	West Germany

=== 1980s ===
Year	English title	Original title	Director(s)	Production country
1980	Rod Gröth		Jörg Moser-Metius	West Germany
1981	Ter land, ter zee en in de lucht		Paul Driessen	Netherlands
1982	Three Monks	三个和尚	A Da	China
1983	Was das Leben so verspricht		Egon Haase	West Germany
1984	The Fight Between the Snipe and the Clam	鹬蚌相争	Hu Jinqing	China
1985	Paradise		Ishu Patel	Canada
1986	Auguszta etet		Csaba Varga	Hungary
1987	Luxo Jr.		John Lasseter	United States
1988	Láska na první pohled		Pavel Koutský	Czechoslovakia
1989	Údel		Jaroslava Havettová	Czechoslovakia

=== 1990s ===
Year	English title	Original title	Director(s)	Production country
1990	Isle of Flowers	Ilha das Flores	Jorge Furtado	Brazil
1991	Posledních 100 let Marx-Leninismu v Cechách		Pavel Koutský	Czechoslovakia
1993	At zije mys!		Pavel Koutský	Czech Republic
1994	Balthazar		Christophe Fraipont	France
1996	Maalaislääkäri		Katariina Lillqvist	Finland
1997	Late at Night		Stefanie Jordan, Stefanie Saghri and Claudia Zoller	Germany
1998	Cinema Alcázar		Florence Jaugey	Nicaragua
1999	Desserts		Jeff Stark	England

=== 2000s ===
Year	English title	Original title	Director(s)	Production country
2000	Média		Pavel Koutský	Czech Republic
2001	Jungle Jazz: Public Enemy #1		Frank Fitzpatrick	United States
2002	Bror min		Jens Jonsson	Sweden
2003	En ausencia		Lucía Cedrón	Argentina
2004	Vet!		Karin Junger and Brigit Hillenius	Netherlands
2005	Jam Session		Izabela Plucinska	Germany
2006	Gratte-papier		Guillaume Martinez	France
2007	Mei		Arvin Chen	Taiwan
2008	Udedh Bun		Siddharth Sinha	India
2009	Jade		Daniel Elliott	United Kingdom

=== 2010s ===
Year	English title	Original title	Director(s)	Production country
2010	Hayerida		Shai Miedzinski	Israel
2011	Pu-seo-jin bam		Hyo-joo Yang	South Korea
2012	Gurêto rabitto		Atsushi Wada	Japan
2013	Die Ruhe bleibt		Stefan Kriekhaus	Germany
2014	Laborat		Guillaume Cailleau	Germany
2015	Bad at Dancing		Joanna Arnow	United States
2016	A Man Returned		Mahdi Fleifel	Denmark
2017	Ensueño en la Pradera		Esteban Arrangoiz Julien	Mexico
2018	Imfura		Samuel Ishimwe	Rwanda
2019	Blue Boy		Manuel Abramovich	Argentina

=== 2020s ===
Year	English title	Original title	Director(s)	Production country	Ref
2020	Filipiñana		Rafael Manuel	Philippines	
2021	Xia Wu Guo Qu Le Yi Ban		Zhang Dalei	China	
2022	Sunday Morning	Manhã de Domingo	Bruno Ribeiro	Brazil	
2023	Dipped in Black	Marungka Tjalatjunu (Dipped in Black)	Matthew Thorne and Derik Lynch	Germany, Australia	
2024	Remains of the Hot Day	熱天午後	Wenqian Zhang	China	
2025	Ordinary Life	普通の生活	Yoriko Mizushiri	Japan, France	
2026	A Woman's Place is Everywhere		Fanny Texier	United States	

== See also ==
- Short Film Golden Bear
