= 23rd Golden Eagle Awards =

2006 Chinese television awards

The 23rd Golden Eagle Awards were held October 27, 2006, in Changsha, Hunan province. Nominees and winners are listed below, winners are in bold.

== Television series ==
=== Best Television Series ===
- **Ren Changxia/任长霞**
- Eighth Route Army/八路军
- The Qiao Family Grand Courtyard/乔家大院
- Showing Sword/亮剑
- Witness of Memories/记忆的证明
- Lu Liang Heroes/吕梁英雄传
- Jiangtang Prison Camp/江塘集中营
- Home with Kids/家有儿女
- Sha chang dian bing/沙场点兵
- Papa, Can You Hear Me Sing?/搭错车
- Beautiful Field/美丽的田野
- Sky of History/历史的天空

=== Best Mini-series ===
- **Chenyun in Linjiang/陈云在临江**
- **Stone Lock Channel/走进石锁沟**
- Aurora Borealis/北极光
- True Love/真情
- Tiny Me/小小的我
- Xibaipo/西柏坡

=== Best Directing for a Television Series ===
- **Yang Yang for Witness of Memories**

=== Best Writing for a Television Series ===
- **Ge Fei for Ren Changxia**

=== Most Popular Actor ===
- **Zhang Guoli for Flos Sophorae**

=== Most Popular Actress ===
- **Jiang Qinqin for The Qiao Family Grand Courtyard**

=== Audience's Choice for Actor ===
- Li Youbin for Showing Sword
- Zhang Guoli for Flos Sophorae
- Li Xuejian for Papa, Can You Hear Me Sing?
- Wu Jinan for Keep the Red Flag Flying

=== Audience's Choice for Actress ===
- Liu Jia for Ren Changxia
- Jiang Qinqin for Flos Sophorae
- Zhu Yuanyuan for Nine Phoenixes
- Yin Tao for Papa, Can You Hear Me Sing?

=== Best Art Direction for a Television Series ===
- **Art direction group for Genghis Khan**

=== Best Cinematography for a Television Series ===
- **Cheng Shengsheng for Beautiful Field**

=== Best Lighting for a Television Series ===
- **Yao Zhuoxi for Nine Phoenixes**

=== Best Sound Recording for a Television Series ===
- **Sound recording group for Sha Chang Dian Ping**

== Literature and art programs ==
=== Best Literature and Art Program ===
- **2005 CCTV New Year's Gala/中央电视台春节联欢晚会**
- 100 Anniversary - Deng Xiaoping/纪念邓小平诞辰100周年
- Midmoon Special Program/半个世纪的团聚—―中秋特别节目
- 84 Anniversary of CCP Celebration, In Guangdong/南粤先锋颂――广东省庆祝中国共产党成立八十四周年大型文艺晚會
- 2006 Hunan TV Spring Festival Gala/和和美美过新年――湖南卫视2006年春节联欢晚会
- For Justice and Peace/为了正义与和平

=== Best Directing for a Literature and Art Program ===
- **Directing group for 2005 CCTV New Year's Gala**

=== Best Cinematography for a Literature and Art Program ===
- **Cinematography group for 2005 CCTV New Year's Gala**

=== Best Art Direction for a Literature and Art Program ===
- **Art Direction group for 60 Anniversary of Taiwan Retrocession Commemoration (Our Chinese Heart)/中华情――纪念台湾光复六十周年大型文艺晚会**

== Documentary ==
=== Best Television Documentary ===
- **The Forbidden City/故宫'**
- **No. 236 Pere David's Deer/236号麋鹿.孤独者的故事**
- Singer Cong Fei/大爱无疆·歌者丛飞
- New Tibet/新西藏
- Mei Lanfang/梅兰芳

=== Best Short Documentary ===
- **Backing Soul/归来，殉难亡灵**
- Construction Site/工地
- Rosy Cloudy/霞映长空

=== Best Writing and Directing for a Television Documentary ===
- **Writing & directing group for The Forbidden City**

=== Best Cinematography for a Television Documentary ===
- **Cinematography group for The Forbidden City**

== Children and teens programs ==
=== Best Animation ===
- **Winter Of Three Hairs /三毛流浪记**
- Pig King /天上掉下个猪八戒
- Big Ear Tutu /大耳朵图图
