= Ink wash animation =

Ink wash animation (Chinese: 水墨动画; pinyin: Shuǐmò dònghuà) is an animation style that is unique to China. This style combines both Chinese traditional aesthetics of Shui-mo and modern animation techniques. It first appeared in 1961 with the first Chinese ink-wash animation Tadpoles Searching for Mother. After the 1990s, film studios gradually gave up ink-wash animation production due to the high demand in cost and techniques.

== Development ==
In the late 1950s, inspired by China's legendary painter Qi Baishi's water-ink painting, Chinese animation industry pioneers began to explore ways to turn Chinese traditional paintings into cartoon form. Developed by cinematographer Duan Xiaoxuan, The first ink-wash animation film, Tadpoles Searching for Mother, received the Best Animated Film Prize at the First Hundred Flowers Awards, as well as several international prizes. Since then, more ink-wash films were produced.

But by the 1990s, animation studios without government funding were urged to produce cheap television series instead of costly ink-wash production. Techniques that had once been identified as state secrets were used to shoot commercial advertising. Feeling from Mountain and Water, produced in 1988, is said to be the last masterpiece of Chinese ink-wash animation film.

== Major works ==
=== Tadpoles Searching for Mother (1961) ===
The film is based on a children's story written by Fang Huizhen and Sheng Lude. A group of newly born tadpoles decide to seek their mother who they've never met before. On the way, they mistake golden fish, a crab, a tortoise and a fish for their mother, and they gather new clues about their mother's appearance through each encounter.

This 14-minute film has been internationally recognized in many film festivals, including the Locarno International Film Festival in 1961, the 4th Annecy International Animation Film Festival in 1962, and the 3rd Zagreb World Festival of Animated Films in 1978.

On the surface, the film appears to be simple. However, each frame required complex techniques and much work to present the artistic style of ink-wash painting. The techniques were even regarded as a "state secret".

=== The Cowboy's Flute (1963) ===
Produced in 1963, this film uses Chinese ink paintings to depict the charming relationship between a young cow herding boy with extraordinary flute playing skills and his faithful water buffalo. The boy falls asleep in a tree, and he dreams that he has lost his buffalo. It turns out that the buffalo is drawn to the beautiful scenery of a waterfall and refuses to return to the herding boy. The boy then plays the flute, and the melody helps bring the buffalo back to him.

There is no dialogue in the film. Story is told through animation and the accompanying music, therefore the film is entirely accessible to a non-Chinese speaking audience. The flute melody was played by China's most famous bamboo flute soloist Lu Chunling. The film was awarded the Golden Prize at the Odense International Fairy Tale Film Festival in Denmark. Some deemed ink-wash animation the "fifth Chinese invention".

This film's title is also referred to by some as The Buffalo Boy and His Flute or The Buffalo Boy's Flute (Buffalo Boy for short), or The Cowherd's Flute.

=== The Deer's Bell (1982) ===
Directed by Wu Qiang and Tang Cheng, an old man and his granddaughter rescue an injured young deer. The girl and the young deer develop a close relationship. After the recovery, the deer returns to the wild. Feeling sad, the girl puts a bell on the deer. Disappearing into the mountain valley, the deer's bell continues to echo.

=== Feeling from Mountain and Water (1988) ===
Named after a phrase for landscape painting, Feeling from Mountain and Water became the last water-ink animation. The film tells the simple tale of an impoverished elderly zither musician and a young boy. The zither musician falls ill on his way back home. The boy kindly takes him to his house and takes care of the musician. To thank the boy, the musician begins to teach the boy the zither and becomes his mentor and friend. The film eschews dialogue, yet the animation and music make the film rich in emotion and philosophical ideas.

The 18-minute film is regarded by many as the masterpiece of Chinese ink-wash animation. The musical accompaniment of the film is mainly featured by zither, however, "some of the most moving moments of the film unfold purely through the image to the sound of rushing winds or total silence".

== Decline ==
=== Cultural Revolution ===
During the ten-year turmoil of Cultural Revolution, many animation producers were attacked, and the development of animation industry was suspended. The Cowboy's Flute became the target of criticism because of its representation of pastoral life instead of class struggles.

=== Market economy reform ===
When ink-wash animation was first produced in 1960s, China was under the planned economy. Film studios were owned and supported by the state. Fundings were granted to animation production at the standard of 8000RMB per minute. Consequently, artists and technicians in the production teams were able to fully engage in artistic creation and innovation without financial or commercial burdens.

However, starting in the late 1980s, China began its transition into market economy. State-owned studios lost their government funding, and were urged to produce cheap television series to support themselves. Ink-wash animation production was regarded as "costly" and "unnecessary".
