= Hu Jinqing =

Chinese animator and director (1936–2019)

- 胡进庆
- Born: March 1936; Changzhou, Jiangsu, China
- Died: 13 May 2019 (aged 83); Shanghai, China
- Occupations: Animator, director
- Notable work: The Fight Between the Snipe and the Clam (1983), Calabash Brothers (1986–87)
- Awards: Golden Rooster Award for Best Animation (1984); Silver Bear for Best Short Film (1984)

Hu Jinqing (Chinese: 胡进庆; March 1936 – 13 May 2019) was a Chinese animator and film director, and a pioneer in adapting the traditional art of Chinese paper cutting to animation. His film The Fight Between the Snipe and the Clam won the Silver Bear for Best Short Film at the 1984 Berlin International Film Festival. He co-directed the 1980s animated television series Calabash Brothers and created the Hulu (Calabash) Babies, which have become some of the most popular animated characters in China.

== Life and career ==
Hu was born in March 1936 in Changzhou, Jiangsu, Republic of China. He joined the Shanghai Animation Film Studio in the 1950s as a young artist.

In 1958, he assisted Wan Guchan, a founder of China's animation industry, in making the first-ever Chinese paper cutting animation film, Pigsy Eats Watermelon.

In 1983, Hu directed the animated short film The Fight Between the Snipe and the Clam, based on the Chinese proverb "in the fight between the snipe and the clam, the fisherman has the best of it". Hu was praised for bringing "vibrant, entirely believable life" to his animation, with "impeccable" timing that makes the movements of the animals "remarkably real". The film won the 1984 Golden Rooster Award for Best Animation. It garnered international attention when it was shown at Animafest Zagreb and won the Silver Bear for Best Short Film at the 1984 Berlin International Film Festival.

In the 1980s, Hu, together with Ge Guiyun and Zhou Keqin, co-directed the animated television series Calabash Brothers. It was extremely popular when aired in 1986 to 1987. The Hulu (Calabash) Babies, the characters they created in the series, have become some of the most popular animated characters in China, exceeded only by Sun Wukong.

Hu continued to make animated films until the late 1990s and was an advocate for wildlife conservation. His 1998 film, Snow Fox, has been praised as "a beautifully animated and deeply felt appeal for the protection of the wildlife".

Hu directed more than 10 animated films, three of which won the Excellent Film Award from the Ministry of Culture of China, including The Naughty Snub-nosed Monkey, The Fight Between the Snipe and the Clam, and The Straw Man. He also participated in the production of more than 30 animated films, including The Proud General, The Fisher Boy, The Ginseng Baby, and The Golden Conch.

On 13 May 2019, Hu died at Shanghai Sixth People's Hospital, at the age of 83.

== Filmography ==
- The Naughty Snub-nosed Monkey (1982)
- The Fight Between the Snipe and the Clam (1983)
- The Straw Man (1985)
- Calabash Brothers (1986)
- Mantis Stalks the Cicada (1988)
- Cockfighting (1988)
- Catching the Mouse (1988)
- The Stronger Gets Hooked (1988)
- The Egret and the Tortoise (1992)
- The Cat and the Rat (1992)
- Snow Fox (1998)
