= Te Wei =

Chinese animator (1915–2010)

- simplified Chinese: 特伟; traditional Chinese: 特偉; pinyin: Tè Wěi
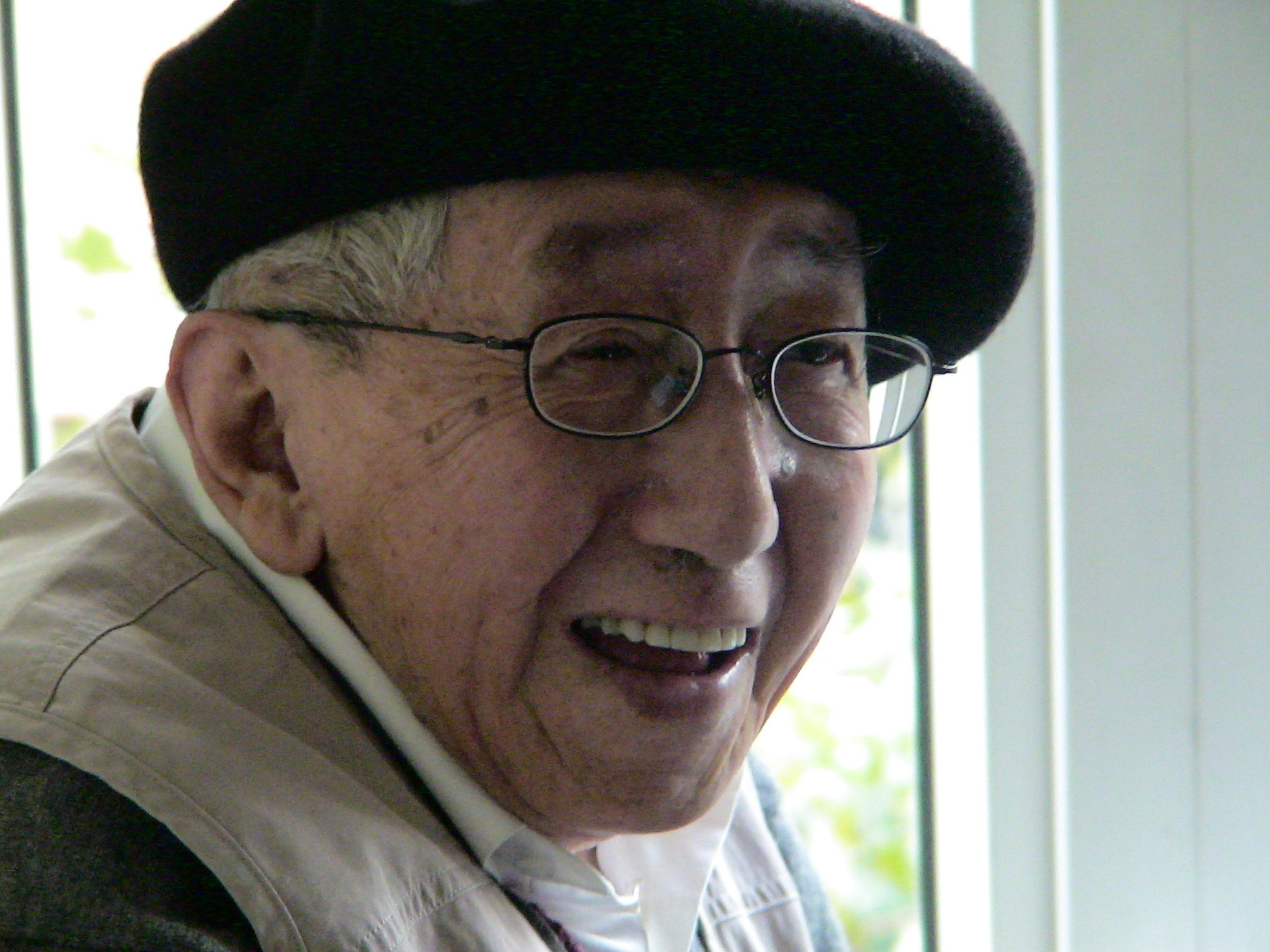
- Te Wei in 2006
- Born: Sheng Song (Chinese: 盛松); August 22, 1915; Shanghai
- Died: February 4, 2010 (aged 94); Shanghai
- Known for: The Proud General
- Awards: ASIFA Prize; 1995

Te Wei
- Simplified Chinese: 特伟
- Traditional Chinese: 特偉
Transcriptions
Standard Mandarin
- Hanyu Pinyin: Tè Wěi
- Wade–Giles: T'e4 Wei3

Sheng Song
- Chinese: 盛松
Transcriptions
Standard Mandarin
- Hanyu Pinyin: Shèng Sōng
- Wade–Giles: Sheng4 Sung1

Te Wei (simplified Chinese: 特伟; traditional Chinese: 特偉; pinyin: Tè Wěi; 22 August 1915 in Shanghai – 4 February 2010 in Shanghai) was a Chinese manhua artist and animator. He is probably best known for the 1956 short animated film The Proud General. From about 1960, he worked in an ink-wash animation style that was influenced by the painter Qi Baishi. Not permitted to carry on his animation during the Cultural Revolution, Te Wei regained a position of artistic influence in the late 1970s and the 1980s with a series of animated films in painterly style.

== Biography ==
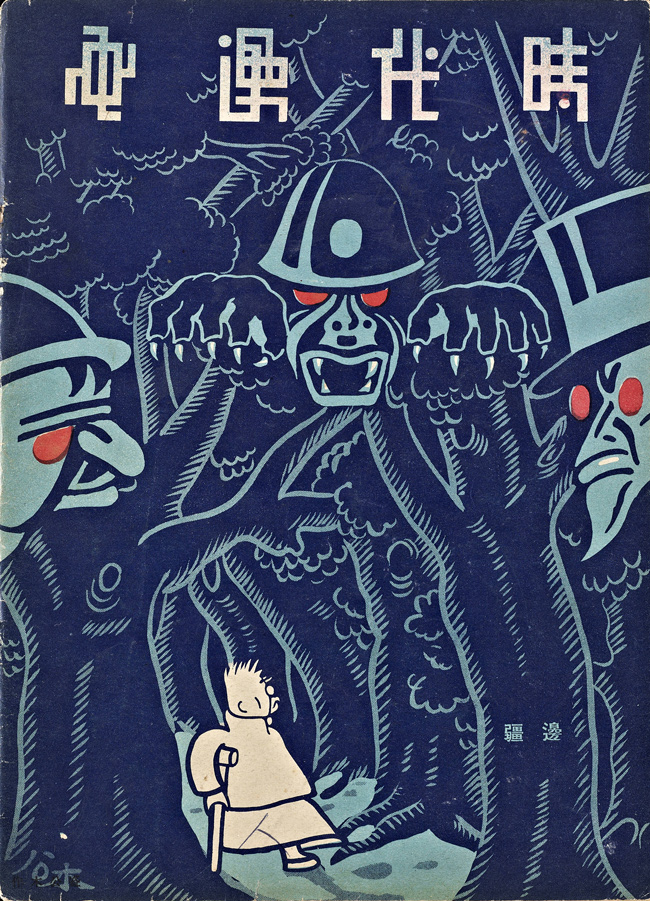
The Borderlands by Te Wei, published in Modern Sketch, 1930s

Te Wei was born as Sheng Song (Chinese: 盛松) to a poor family in Shanghai. As a teenager, he started drawing political cartoons, and would later make a living drawing anti‑Japanese propaganda. After Mao Zedong's seizing power in 1949, an executive in charge of the Changchun Film Studio would remember Te Wei's cartoons, and approached him to lead the studio's animation department, despite his total lack of experience in animation. The Japanese animator Tadahito Mochinaga served as his mentor, and the two became lifelong friends.

Within a year, the studio was relocated to Shanghai, where they enjoyed a brief period of artistic freedom with governmental funding during the Hundred Flowers Campaign. Initially, much was learned by studying Soviet animation, but the studio soon started experimenting with techniques based on domestic traditions. The Proud General (1956) shows influences from both Chinese culture, with character designs and music inspired by the Peking opera, and Soviet animators such as Ivan Ivanov-Vano, as well as western ones such as Walt Disney.

During a visit to the studio, then Vice Premier Chen Yi suggested that they make an animated version of the paintings of Qi Baishi. A group of animators led by Te Wei thus set out to create Little Tadpoles Looking for Mama. The film was the first to make use of ink-wash animation, and would go on to win several awards, both in China and internationally. It was followed by The Cowboy's Flute (1963) in the same technique.

In 1964, as Mao was gearing up for the Cultural Revolution, the studio was shut down, and Te Wei was placed in solitary confinement for a year. To keep his spirits up, he would sketch on the glass pane of a table that stood in his small room, erasing the drawings when he heard a guard approaching. Te Wei spent the following years in exile in the countryside, and was not able to return to the studio until 1975. The constraints of the Cultural Revolution were starting to loosen, and Mao's death in 1976 was followed by a new period of artistic vigour.

The 1980s would be an intense period for Te Wei, who found himself in charge of some 500 workers at the studio. Still benefitting from state funding, the studio produced some of its most acclaimed and experimental work. Having stepped down as studio president in 1984, Te Wei directed the feature film The Monkey King Conquers the Demon (1984), based on Journey to the West, and the acclaimed Feeling from Mountain and Water (1988), that would turn out to be his last film.

In 1989, the Communist Party honored Te Wei by naming him one of the four outstanding filmmakers in China's history.

== Filmography ==
- The Proud General (驕傲的將軍), 1956
- Little Tadpoles Looking for Mama (小蝌蚪找媽媽), 1960
- The Cowboy's Flute (牧笛), 1963
- The Monkey King Conquers the Demon (金猴降妖), 1985
- Feeling from Mountain and Water (山水情), 1988
