= Zhu Zhixiang =

Chinese author

- 诸志祥
- Born: 1941; Shaoxing, Zhejiang, China
- Died: September 8, 2015 (aged 73–74); Shanghai, China
- Occupations: Animator; Novelist
- Writing career
- Language: Chinese
- Years active: 1982-2015
- Notable work: Black Cat Detective

Zhu Zhixiang (Chinese: 诸志祥; 1941 - September 8, 2015) with the pen name Haogu, was a Chinese writer of children's books and manhua born in Shaoxing, Zhejiang and a mainland Chinese writer. His main works include Bajie Returns Home, Black Cat Detective, and Alien, among which Black Cat Detective was adapted into a donghua and broadcast on CCTV in China and NHK in Japan.

He worked at Shanghai Animation Film Studio.

== Legal action ==
In June 1987, Zhu Zhixiang brought Dai Tielang to court, suing Dai Tielang for infringing his copyright and authorship of Black Cat Detective. In the end, the court ruled that Dai Tielang was negligent in publishing the Black Cat Detective comics and periodicals.

After mediation by the court, Dai Tielang compensated Zhu Zhixiang 2,880 yuan from the writing remuneration, and Zhu Zhixiang withdrew the lawsuit.
