= Baigujing =

Demon from the novel Journey to the West

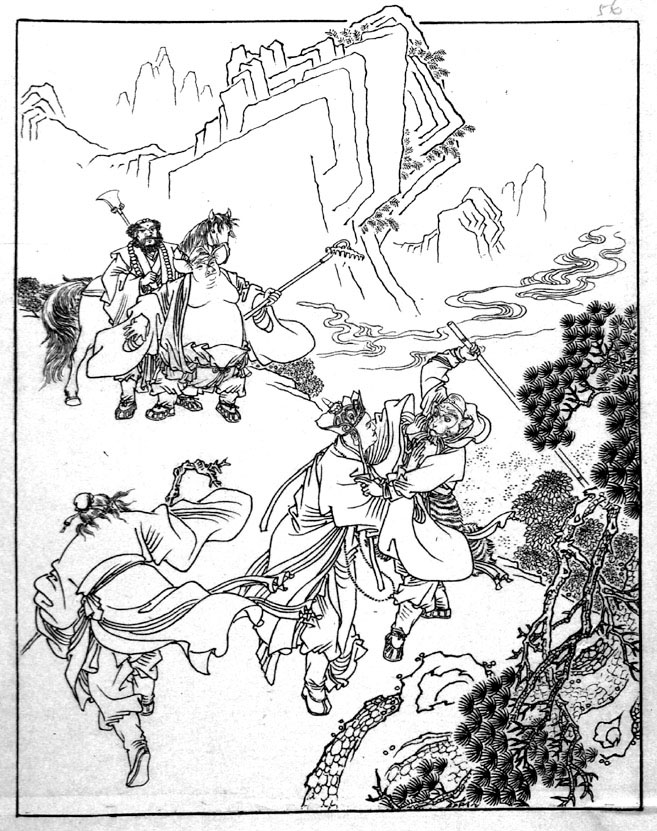
Baigujing

Baigujing (Chinese: 白骨精; pinyin: Báigǔjīng) is a demon from the 16th-century novel Journey to the West. The name is translated into English as White Bone Spirit in the William John Francis Jenner translation. Baigujing is a shapeshifting demoness, and in her true form she is depicted as a skeleton.

Baigujing was a demon who desired to eat the flesh of Tang Sanzang. It disguised itself as a village girl and offered Tang Sanzang and his disciples poisonous fruits. Due to Baigujing's strong powers, only Sun Wukong could detect that she was a demon. He hit her with his staff, seemingly killing her. Tang Sanzang is angered at Sun Wukong and performs the Band-tightening spell, but Sha Wujing placates the situation. Sun Wukong tried to explain that the 'village girl' was a demon, but they didn't believe him. Tang Sanzang believed she was an innocent and buried her. Having survived the attack, Baigujing dug underground to recover.

After some time, Baigujing returned disguised as an elderly woman, lying to the group that the village girl from earlier was her daughter. Sun Wukong sees through Baigujing's disguise once again and kills her. Angered, Tang Sanzang performs the Band-tightening spell again, but Sha Wujing placates the situation. The group continues to not believe Sun. When Baigujing returns a third time as an elderly man asking about his daughter and wife, the group immediately feels guilty, as they believe they were the two women Sun Wukong had slain. Baigujing taunts Sun Wukong with its powers, which only Sun could hear, provoking him into attacking it.

Provoked, Sun finally beats Baigujing with his staff and kills the demon, revealing that it was just a skeleton spirit. Sun Wukong shows this to Tang Sanzang, who initially believes him, but Zhu Bajie convinces Tang Sanzang that Sun Wukong transformed the corpse into a skeleton to evade the Band-tightening spell. Tang Sanzang furiously scolds Sun Wukong for his reckless slaying. He cuts his ties with Sun Wukong and banishes him. Feeling upset by hearing his master's words, Sun Wukong leaves and returns to Water Curtain Cave. In his absence, Tang Sanzang gets caught by another demon – the Yellow Robe Demon that Zhu Bajie and Sha Wujing cannot defeat. Zhu Bajie has no choice but to ask for Sun Wukong's help to save Tang Sanzang. The group finally starts to believe in Sun Wukong, who also forgives them after they apologize to him for misunderstanding Baigujing's deception. The group continue to their journey West afterwards.

== Adaptations ==
- In The Monkey King Conquers the Demon, Baigujing is the main antagonist. This film has a few differences from the novel:
  - When she took on the identity of a young woman, she claimed that she was a widow.
  - Her second impersonation is a young boy who is the son of her first.
  - In her last impersonation, she did manage to avoid being killed by the Monkey King; hence, she succeeded in capturing the Tang Priest.
  - She is the daughter of the Nine-Tailed Vixen (the mother of the Golden and Silver Horned Kings in the novel), with the film adapting the plot of Sun Wukong killing and replacing her.
- In the film The Monkey King 2, she is the main antagonist and tries to persuade Sun Wukong to betray Tripitaka so that he can be free of the headache ring.
- In the film Kung Fu Panda: The Paws of Destiny, Baigujing is a major antagonist.
- In the TV series Lego Monkie Kid, Baigujing (referred to as Lady Bone Demon) is the main antagonist in the second and third season.
- In Black Myth: Wukong, Baigujing is mentioned in Chapter 6 and is implied to be Sun Wukong's former love interest.
