= Calabash Brothers =

Chinese animated TV series

- Chinese: 葫芦兄弟
- Genre: Action
- Story by: Yao Zhongli; Yang Yuliang; Mo Du
- Directed by: Hu Jinqing; Ge Guiyun; Zhou Keqin; Shen Zuwei
- Composer: Wu Yingju
- Country of origin: China
- No. of episodes: 13

Original release
- Release: 1986 – 1991

Calabash Brothers or Hulu Brothers (Chinese: 葫芦兄弟; pinyin: Húlu Xiōngdì) is a Chinese animation TV series produced by Shanghai Animation Film Studio and directed by Hu Jinqing, Ge Guiyun, and Zhou Keqin. It was extremely popular when it aired on TV in 1986–1987.

== Names ==
The series can be variously translated as Calabash Brothers, Hulu Brothers, Gourd Brothers, Seven Brothers or Pumpkin Brothers. In China, the series is popularly known as Huluwa (Chinese: 葫芦娃; pinyin: Húluwá; lit. 'Calabash Children').

== Background ==
In the 1980s the series was one of the most popular animations in China. While it has been praised as much as Havoc in Heaven domestically, it was released at a point when the Chinese animation industry was in a relatively downed state compared to that of the rest of the international community. Still, the series was translated into 7 different languages. The episodes were produced with a vast amount of paper-cut animations, led by Zhou Keqin, who became the director of paper-cut animations in 1975.

== Story ==
Legend has it that two demons were jailed in the Calabash Mountain, one a Scorpion spirit and the other a Snake spirit. One day, a pangolin happens to drill a hole on the slope and the two spirits escape from the cave, causing grave harm to the nearby residents. The pangolin hurries to an old man and says that only by growing calabashes in seven colors can they annihilate the spirits. So the old man spares no time in growing seven calabashes, each a different color of the rainbow: red, orange, yellow, green, cyan, blue, and purple.

The calabashes ripen sequentially, falling off their stems to the ground, and transforming into seven boys. Each has a unique supernatural ability such as super-strength, enhanced hearing and sight, invisibility, and pyrokinesis, as well as a weakness. Each of them also have above average strength and speed given that all of them have shown the ability to lift items several times their own weight and leap several metres. With a combined effort, they set on a mission to defeat the demons in a 13 episode-long adventure. Upon defeating the demons, the seven brothers seal themselves together into a mountain with all the colours of the rainbow, ready to awaken to fight evil should it ever arise again.

In a sequel series called "Calabash Brothers: Little Diamond", it is later revealed that there was a third demon, specifically the sister to the snake spirit, that had been in hiding underground during the whole battle. The only survivor from the defeat of the two demons, a humanoid toad with a blinded eye, comes and desperately reports the news. Naturally, the demon is enraged and attacks the mountain that contains the seven brothers, releasing and defeating each of them. However, upon their defeat they fuse together into a single boy with the powers of all seven (official name is "Diamond Brother") who successfully vanquishes the final demon. After crushing the snake sister in a giant Calabash formed from the seven brothers (who came back into being from the Diamond Brother), the Diamond Brother changes into a mountain, forever at peace.

== Characters ==
=== Main characters ===
- Grandpa (爷爷): He was an old man living alone on the mountain. He was a kind hearted individual as he had saved a nest of bird chicks from a snake by beheading it with a throw of his knife, saved a pangolin stuck under a boulder and taking on the task of growing the calabash that would vanquish the spirits, he quickly obliged. He quickly bonded with his 7 adopted (grand) children and cares so deeply for them that he ultimately gave his life to lend the seventh brother his gourd so that the 7 brothers could finally crush the spirits under a rainbow mountain. In the 2016 series, he was revived as a Tudigong (lord of the soil and ground) (土地公) for his good deeds in life.
- Pangolin (穿山甲): He was a talking pangolin who accidentally released the spirits from their ten thousand year entombment. To make up for his mistake, he guided Grandpa to the calabash seed and instructed him to grow the calabash and vanquish the spirits once and for all. He was later thrown off of a cliff by the scorpion spirit after he had helped Grandpa and Second Brother escape the spirits’ fortress.
- Big Brother (Red) (大娃): Has super-strength and is able to grow to immense proportions at will. He is a headstrong individual, albeit slightly gullible. Attempting to storm the spirits' fortress, he fell into an illusion trap laid by the spirits, and was imprisoned for most of the series. Being the eldest, he is referred to as the "big" brother, which is also fitting with his abilities. In the second series, he is captured by the third demon with a special golden coin that traps him inside it.
- Second Brother (Orange) (二娃): Has enhanced hearing and sight. He is the strategist among the brothers. Due to him not having a physical ability, he becomes easier to capture compared to the rest of his siblings. He fell victim to the spirits' enchanted mirror, and was blinded for part of the series. He also partially lost his hearing, but was able to recover it along with his sight. He was able to use his recovered abilities and quick thinking to work with his Sixth Brother in a plan to free all their brothers that were trapped in the fortress. In the second series, the third demon uses a special fan to blind him with hurricane winds and capture him with a net. Right after the moment of him coming out of his rock, he seems to be the only one to be supposedly still asleep.
- Third Brother (Yellow) (三娃): Has invulnerability and is a fearless individual, but is also the most impetuous (so much so he left the vine before he was ready to transform). Like his eldest brother, he attempted to storm the fortress, but his over-confidence allowed him to be trapped by an enchanted Urumi. Before capture, he successfully shattered the enchanted mirror, thus preventing the spirits from spying on the remaining of his brothers who are still vulnerable (currently inside their calabash). In the second series he, befitting his impulsive nature, falls off the mountain on his accord and proceeds to engage the third demon and her forces. Out of the seven brothers he, noticeably, lasts the longest and very nearly defeated the third demon until she found that his bottom was normal and managed to knock him out by striking it.
- Fourth Brother (Green) (四娃): Able to create and control fire and lightning at will. Although he does not require a source to draw fire or lightning from, he is particularly sensitive to the cold, which causes him to become drowsy and fall asleep. The spirits' gave him a special "cooling" wine that put him to sleep before freezing him in a block of ice. The Fourth and Fifth brothers transformed one right after the other, and as a result are closer to one another and are both supposedly twins. In the second series, he is the last brother to be captured when the third demon uses a tub of oil to mix with his fire to knock him out while he was distracted. Throughout all his brothers, in the second series, he manage to escape most traps that had been set up.
- Fifth Brother (Cyan) (五娃): Able to create and control water at will. While he has a higher tolerance against fire, his ability to create water is limited, and he at times requires to draw from an external source. His affinity with water gave him a taste for wine, and the spirits' were able to trap him when he became drunk after they summoned a gigantic wine goblet that kept refilling itself for him to drink eventually causing him to fall into a coma. The Fourth and Fifth brothers transformed one right after the other, and as a result are closer to one another and possibly twins. In the second series, he is captured while replenishing his supply of water, the third demon uses a special pollution artifact to poison the water and him as well.
- Sixth Brother (Blue) (六娃): Is able to become invisible and sometimes incorporeal, enabling him to escape even when he has been caught. He is the most mischievous of his brothers, and enjoys using his powers to wreak havoc within the spirits' fortress. Being invisible, he was able to steal an artifact from the spirits to release his brothers who were in captivity. Due to the time the Second Brother spent with his younger brothers while recovering, the two of them are closer to one another, and the older sometimes scolds the younger for sidetracking on his tasks to have fun, knowing the fact that their other brothers are in danger and in need of their help. In the second series he is captured when the third demon attaches a leaf as a tail to him, allowing her to still see his location (even when he turns invisible, the attached leaf does not) and capturing him with a copper spike trap.
- Little Brother (Purple) (七娃): Although lacking any powers of his own, the youngest brother possesses a magical gourd which is able to draw anything he wishes into its center. He is also able to use it to manipulate the emotions of others. He is the most affectionate and trusting of his brothers, even willing to hand over his gourd when asked. His sixth brother cares for him deeply and had saved him more than several occasions, coming to his aid when he is in danger. He was brainwashed by the spirits to serve them, and used his magical gourd to draw his brothers into its center; the spirits then took the gourd from him and drew him in as well. He was able to recover his senses in the final episode, and reclaimed his gourd to trap the spirits. In the second series, he manages to capture the third demon and her henchman but she, in turn, uses a special insect to eat its way out of his gourd and captures him. This caused him to lose his gourd forever which may be the reason the Diamond Brother doesn't inherit the gourd.
- Diamond Brother (White) (葫芦小金刚): His literal name is "Calabash Little Diamond". He is a fusion of all seven brothers created when the seven brothers utilize a magical lotus sent by a mountain spirit. He has all the powers of the seven brothers (except for the youngest) and is incredibly powerful. He however has a fatal weakness, the diamond gem that hangs around his neck is the source of his power and when removed, he becomes powerless. However, if he can come into contact with sunlight, the gemstone will automatically come to him and he will regain his full power. Additionally he inherits the third brother's weakness of his bottom being normal and is not immune to the Snake Sister's poison gas.

=== Villains/Soldiers ===
- Scorpion King (蝎子大王): One of the spirits who was imprisoned in and escaped from the Calabash Mountain. He can transform into, namely, a scorpion that has a hooked stinger. In humanoid form, he can still manipulate and lengthen his hooked stinger at will, as well as transform one of his hands into scorpion claws. He has been shown to "teleport" from one place to another, as shown by a blackish tornado traveling to his destination.
- Snake Queen (金蛇夫人): One of the spirits who was imprisoned in and escaped from the Calabash Mountain. She should be regarded as the major threat because of her magic artifact, able to conjure multiple weapons imbued with magic as well as enchanted wind able to freeze objects in blocks of ice.
- Snake Sister (青蛇大王): An incredibly powerful spirit with various different magical artifacts. Her two most prized and revered artifacts are a small ornate dagger she keeps in her hair which can become 48 different weapons and a small universe bag (景仰乾坤袋) that can summon 308 different magical artifacts. It is primarily because of these two artifacts that she had successfully captured the seven Calabash Brothers. Even without these artifacts she is incredibly resilient even able to regenerate after being cut in two and is also able to spit poison gas. Her final ability, when both the previous artifacts were destroyed by the Diamond Brother, is to become a massive two-headed hydra-like snake with immense strength and can spit lightning and tornadoes from each head.

== Creators ==
| English Production | Crew | Romanized | Original Version |
|---|---|---|---|
| Screenwriters | 编剧 | Yao Zhongli; Yang Yuliang; Mo Yan | 姚忠礼 杨玉良 墨犊 |
| Directors | 导演 | Hu Jinqing; Zhou Keqin; Shen Zuwei | 胡进庆 周克勤 沈祖慰 |
| Design | 造型设计 | Wu Yunchu; Jinqing | 吴云初 进庆 |
| Background Design | 背景设计 | Chang Baosheng | 常保生 |
| Action Design | 动作设计 | Shen Rudong; Shen Zuwei; Wu Zhongwen; Sun Nengzi; Zhu Shuqin; Lin Jie | 沈如东 沈祖慰 伍仲文 孙能子 朱淑琴 林杰 |
| Painted Scene | 绘景 | Duan Xiaoxi; Li Qingji; Shen Tongchun; Zhu Xinghe; Gong Jinfu | 段小西 李庆吉 沈同春 朱行和 龚金福 |
| Drawing | 绘制 | Yue Huimin; Zhi Yangtai | 岳慧 支仰泰 |
| Photography | 摄影 | Wu Huarong | 吴华荣 |
| Photography Assistant | 摄影助理 | Zhu Yuping | 朱毓平 |
| Recording | 录音 | Hou Shekang | 侯申康 |
| Editing | 剪辑 | Mo Puzhong | 莫普忠 |
| Effects | 效果 | Zhang Yuanhao | 张元浩 |
| Recording Assistant | 录音助理 | Yan Miaoying | 虞妙英 |
| Editing Assistant | 剪辑助理 | Qiang Xiaobai | 强小柏 |
| Composer | 作曲 | Wu Yingju | 吴应炬 |
| Performed by | 演奏 | Shanghai Film Orchestra; Jin Xiaoping; Wang Chi | 上海电影乐团 金晓平 王迟 |
| Singing | 演唱 | Shanghai Children's Palace Chorus | 上海市少年宫合唱队 |
| Dubbing | 配音 | Fan Jie; Zhu Sha; Tan Pengfei; Chariot; Dai Xin; Zhu Yi; Ni Yilin | 范捷 朱莎 谈鹏飞 战车 戴欣 朱艺 倪以临 |
| Dubbing Guide | 配音指导 | Wei Qichang | 韦启昌 |
| Production Director | 制片主任 | Wang Yulan | 王玉兰 |
| Producer | 制片 | Qian Yueying | 钱月英 |

== Awards ==
- Third Prize, Cairo International Children's Film Festival, Egypt.
- Best film of 1988, CPC Tibet Autonomous Region Committee.

== In popular culture ==
- Calabash Brothers was featured on Hainan Airlines' safety videos to celebrate the Chinese New Year, first launching on its Boeing 737 fleet, then expanding to the rest of its fleet. The grandfather and seven brothers present the safety instruction as they battle and defeat the Scorpion King and Snake Queen.
- The video game My Time at Portia, developed by Chinese developer Pathea Games, features seven Hulu brothers identified by the same colours as the seven Calabash brothers. Their individual ages are similar to the Calabash brothers: Big (red) brother being the oldest and the purple brother being the youngest.

== See also ==
- Havoc in Heaven
