= Desserts (film) =

- Directed by: Jeff Stark
- Written by: Jeff Stark
- Produced by: Jill Robertson
- Starring: Ewan McGregor
- Cinematography: Kate Stark
- Music by: Simon Boswell; Alex Heffes; Algernon Thompson
- Release date: 1998
- Running time: 2 minutes 35 seconds

Desserts is a 1998 British short film directed by Jeff Stark and starring (as the only actor) Ewan McGregor. Desserts won the Silver Bear for Best Short Film at the 1999 Berlin Film Festival.

== Cast ==
- Ewan McGregor as Stroller

== Plot ==
A man (the stroller) is walking along a beach and finds a chocolate éclair, ponders over it for a bit then decides to eat it, then suddenly is yanked into the sea by a hook and line.

== Production ==
The film has no dialogue. "I was faxed the script - and it was just one sheet of paper, but it made me laugh so much that I just had to do it." explained Mc Gregor. The film was his third short and the "black humour" and "minimal commitment" implied decided the actor.

The film was produced by Jill Robertson (producer’s assistant on Trainspotting and production supervisor on A Life Less Ordinary), who approached the actor. It was filmed in a single day at Turnberry in Ayrshire on a budget of £13,975.

== Release ==
The film was released in October 1998.

== Reception ==
The short was described as "a typical “funny with a twist” short that uses one of our weak points to question how we feed ourselves as a species: greed." The short was also praised for its "sense of reduction and simplicity". Other commentators found it was "a cruelly funny short film" and " one of those shorts that function like jokes and whose success hinges on the punchline. The sheer unexpected violence of the denouement [...] leaves the audience stunned."

It received the Silver Bear for Best Short Film at the 1999 Berlin Film Festival.

It was screened in various festivals, including Busan and Sundance.
