= A Miss Mallard Mystery =

- Genre: Children's; Mystery fiction
- Created by: Robert M. Quackenbush (writer and illustrator)
- Voices of: Kate Hurman; Michael Rudder; Terrence Scammell; Gordon Masten; Arthur Holden
- Composer: James Gelfand
- Countries of origin: Canada; China
- Original language: English
- No. of seasons: 1
- No. of episodes: 26

Production
- Executive producers: Peter Moss; Jin Guoping
- Producers: Cassandra Schafhausen; Chen Guibao
- Running time: 24 minutes per episode
- Production companies: CINAR Corporation; Shanghai Animation Film Studio

Original release
- Network: Teletoon; OTV (Shanghai Media Group)
- Release: September 4, 2000 – September 19, 2001

A Miss Mallard Mystery is a mystery animated series produced by the CINAR Corporation and Shanghai Animation Film Studio for the Teletoon network and OTV (Shanghai Media Group), loosely based on the Robert Quackenbush book series The Miss Mallard Mysteries. Each episode focuses on Miss Mallard and her nephew Willard Widgeon as they visit various places around the world, solving mysteries. All characters in the show are ducks or resemble ducks.

== Plot ==
The famous "ducktective", Miss Mallard, from the children's books, stars in her own TV series solving mysteries all over the world with her nephew, Willard. No matter where Miss Mallard and her nephew travel, they are inevitably caught up in the most intriguing investigations. Creative and endlessly resourceful, Miss Mallard's capable wings can transform a hairpin, a parasol, or a handkerchief into the most unconventional crime-fighting tools. Uncovering clues while escaping suspicious accidents and avoiding mysterious disasters can be tough work, but Miss Mallard always catches her duck! Filled with clues and "hidden evidence", each mystery encourages its viewers to follow the clues and solve the mystery with Miss Mallard.

== Characters ==
- Miss Marjorie Mallard - World-famous "ducktective".
- Willard Widgeon - Miss Mallard's accident-prone nephew and member of the Swiss police.
- Chief Inspector Bufflehead - Willard's often credulous superior and chief inspector of the Swiss police.

== Episodes ==
No.	Title	Location(s)	Original release date	Prod. code
1	"Lost in the Amazon"	Brazil	September 4, 2000	101
A laboratory overgrown by thick jungle. A missing scientist. A secret formula. Carnival in Rio. Mysterious tribeducks. A pay phone. These clues lead Miss Mallard and Willard into the thick Amazon rainforest in the hope they will find a lost friend. When they successfully emerge, a secret plot to destroy the rainforest has been uncovered. But Miss Mallard has all the information she needs to reveal the villains true intentions and locate the missing formula that can save the rainforest once and for all.: Villains: Miguel, Jorge and Lenos
2	"Taxi to Intrigue"	London	September 5, 2000	102
Miss Mallard arrives in foggy London to visit her nephew, Willard, who is in town working on a big international spy ring case. Little do they both know that an innocent ride in a taxi and their kind attempts to return a lost birthday cake with its scripted birthday message to the mysterious Milly will lead Miss Mallard and Willard on a search through London that ends with them solving the very case Willard is working on.: Villain: Christopher
3	"Cable Car to Catastrophe"	Switzerland	September 6, 2000	103
A snowstorm delays Miss Mallard from joining Willard for a ski vacation at Mount Catastrophe in Switzerland. It is a delay that turns out to be a blessing for while riding the cable car up to the top, Miss Mallard witnesses a robbery. Following ski tracks in the fresh snow leads Willard and Miss Mallard deep into a mystery that is only solved when the owner of the Ace of Spades is found.: Villains: The Mergansers (Madame Merganser and her husband, Philip)
4	"Rickshaw to Horror"	Hong Kong	September 7, 2000	104
When Miss Mallard and Willard's rickshaw accidentally hits a pedestrian, events unfold which throw Hong Kong into chaos. Typhoon warnings cause havoc at the ferry terminal. Traffic is brought to a standstill in the middle of the city. A restaurant is cut loose in the harbor. But all are part of an elaborate plot to steal a famous jade necklace on display at a museum. It is a plot that Miss Mallard and Willard soon put an end to when the rickshaw accident turns out to be no accident at all.: Villains: Marshall, Melissa and Harold
5	"Dig to Disaster"	Central America	September 20, 2000	105
Deep in the jungles of Central America, an archeological expedition to discover a lost city is cursed by a legendary Headless Demon. Thankfully, Miss Mallard and Willard are part of the expedition and they soon learn the lost city is not so lost. Someone has been there before them and is now trying to keep them away. In the middle of the jungle, with no more than bicycle tracks for a clue, Miss Mallard reveals the Headless Demon's true identity and a lost treasure is saved.: Villain: Haroldo Scotori
6	"Evil Under the Sea"	Australia	October 3, 2000	106
A scuba-diving vacation in Australia turns serious when Miss Mallard and Willard discover that the Great Barrier Reef is being destroyed. But how? Why? And by who? These questions lead them on a search, literally under the sea, where Dr. Decoy, bent on world domination, has built an incredible underwater city. Miss Mallard, Willard, and the undersea explorer Jacques Canard throw a wrench into Dr. Decoy's plans and save the reefs of the world.: Villain: Paul aka Dr. Decoy
7	"Stage Door to Terror"	Paris	November 9, 2000	107
Miss Mallard and Willard are in Paris to be part of the audience as a great performer brings back her grandmother's dances and sparkly costumes in a brilliant new show. But the performance is short-lived when the notorious jewel thief, The Red Carnation, swoops in and ducknaps the main performer. But what would a jewel thief want with an old costume? Miss Mallard discovers the answer after she stages the switcheroo of a lifetime to catch the villains.: Villains: Phillipe and Gerard
8	"Bicycle to Treachery"	Holland	November 10, 2000	108
A bump in the road sends Miss Mallard crashing through bushes and into the middle of a field in Holland. Separated from the bicycle tour she and Willard are on, Miss Mallard soon finds herself involved in a smuggling ring mystery. While Willard searches for his aunty, Miss Mallard discovers a code book of clues that lead her to save all of Holland from being flooded.: Villain: The Innkeeper (aka The Sneezer)
9	"Danger in Tibet"	Nepal	November 13, 2000	109
Willard has gone missing. He left Switzerland, against orders, in pursuit of a gold thief, and has disappeared in the Himalayas. Miss Mallard comes looking for her nephew but she finds more than she could ever have imagined: a mysterious hidden city, the yeti, a fountain of youth. All play a role in Willard's disappearance and the theft of gold he was investigating. Miss Mallard solves the mystery and ensures the safety off all her new friends, including The Abominable Snowduck of the Himalayas.: Villain: Trembe
10	"Surfboard to Peril"	Hawaii	November 27, 2000	110
All is not well in Miss Mallard and Willard's Hawaiian paradise. A rumbling volcano, an ancient village feud, the discovery of a sacred stone which is stolen, a secret forbidden love: all play a part in the mystery Miss Mallard and Willard must solve. The key lies in the legend of the volcano god, a legend that says the villages will be destroyed. But not if Miss Mallard and Willard can help it.: Villain: Joe Scope
11	"Stairway to Doom"	Scotland	March 6, 2001	111
Miss Mallard and Willard are the heirs to their Aunt Abby's castle in Scotland. But there are other heirs and bickering ones at that. Aunt Abby's will states if any of her relatives can spend one night in her castle, then they can share in the riches. Guests soon begin to go missing one by one and everyone fears the worse: Count Kisscula lives. Miss Mallard and Willard discover the truth: a fake Kisscula, a forgotten relative, and that none of the relatives are missing – but more importantly: Aunt Abby is still alive.: Villain: Mario Sprig
12	"Dogsled to Dread"	Alaska	March 7, 2001	112
An invitation to launch a big dogsled race brings Miss Mallard and Willard to Alaska. But the invitation is as much a mystery as the arrival of The Totem Avenger who has been causing havoc in the township, and who kidnaps a puppy during the dogsled race time trials. No one seems able to stop The Totem Avenger, even the local sheriff. And that is all part of the villains' plot to take over a wilderness preserve and mine it for gold.: Villains: Jed Merganser and Arnold Drake
13	"Gondola to Danger"	Venice	March 8, 2001	113
A peaceful weekend of music and art turns sour for Miss Mallard and Willard when a famous masterpiece is stolen. Clues found all over the city point the finger at one suspect: the great Spanish artist, El Ducko. But El Ducko is one of Miss Mallard's dearest friends and she can't believe he is responsible. She takes it upon herself to prove his innocence, retrieve the stolen masterpiece, and capture the real villain, all before the museum closes at six o'clock or as she discovers, it will be too late.: Villains: Gino and Alfredo
14	"Texas Trail to Calamity"	Texas	April 2, 2001	114
Priceless artifacts have been stolen from all over Europe by an International theft ring. Following the clues, Willard and Inspector Bufflehead go undercover in Texas and stake out The Alamo. Miss Mallard travels to Texas to vacation with Willard after he solves the case, but when she is thrown from her horse, Miss Mallard stumbles upon a mystery of her own. It soon becomes clear to Miss Mallard that she and Willard are working on the same case, and thanks to both their sleuthing, the International theft ring is brought to justice.: Villains: Jack and Mrs Scraup
15	"Express Train to Trouble"	Egypt	April 3, 2001	115
A famous archeologist discovers an ancient Egyptian tomb while Miss Mallard and Willard are traveling on the Nile Express. After the archeologist loads the discovered artifacts on the train, one of the passengers goes missing. Miss Mallard s keen eye for observation, and Willard s knack for discovering clues soon find the missing tourist, and the clipping file in Miss Mallard s knitting bag solves a crime that no one even knows has been committed.: Villain: Arnie the Swindler
16	"Flamenco to Mischief"	Seville	April 4, 2001	116
The great artist and Miss Mallard s long time admirer, El Ducko, welcomes Willard and Miss Mallard to the Flamenco Festival in Spain. When Miss Mallard learns that one of El Ducko s masterpieces was stolen from his art dealer s home, she and Willard take on the case. They soon learn the painting was not stolen because of its value, but because it reveals the location of a notorious gang s hideout. The gang is arrested, but the leader and the actual painting remain missing until Miss Mallard and Willard reveal the true identity of the art thief.: Villain: Lupe aka Red Rosa the Terrible
17	"Hallway to Spite"	Bavaria	April 5, 2001	117
Miss Mallard organizes a costume charity ball at Neuduckstein Castle in Bavaria. Willard accompanies her to guard the donations, and it doesn't take long for mystery to strike. It is said the ghost of a court jester haunts the castle and it looks like it's responsible for the hauntings that plague the ball. Miss Mallard soon realizes there's more than one ghost responsible for the hauntings, and she and Willard set out to prove who's the real ghost of Neuduckstein Castle.: Villain: Countess Van Goosander, Werner Woodduck, Baron Von Drake
18	"Boulevard to Mayhem"	Hollywood	April 6, 2001	118
Not everything is as it appears to be, especially in Hollywood. Miss Mallard and Willard go undercover as actors on the set of a big movie to solve the mystery of who is sabotaging the shoot. The jealous sister, a disgruntled stunt duck, the wanna-be director, or the ever-critical consultant, are on Miss Mallard s list of suspects. The clues point to the wardrobe duck, but in true Hollywood fashion, Miss Mallard realizes that the real villain is always the least likely suspect.: Villain: Bertram Butterball, Edith
19	"Whistle Stop to Fear"	Romania	April 9, 2001	119
Everyone can change and that goes for ducks too! Or can they? Miss Mallard and Willard discover the answer when they are forced to stop over in Zanaville, Romania, a town with a deep dark secret – a secret that comes back to torment them. Miss Mallard and Willard discover that Zanaville is really Zanadoom, the ancestral home of the one and only Kisscula, famed kisspire who kisses his victims when the moon is full, but this is one kisspire who kisses no more. Miss Mallard and Willard must discover the true identity of the imposter, and bring peace back to an entire village.: Villains: None
20	"Jitney to Jeopardy"	Kenya	April 19, 2001	120
A world science conference in Kenya is disrupted when two famous scientists go missing. The clues reveal the scientists have returned home, but Miss Mallard knows better. She smells a rat, or in this case, a duck with plans to take over the world. Miss Mallard has seen it all before and her clipping file confirms that Dr. Decoy has escaped from jail. Now all she and Willard have to do is prove he's in Kenya, catch him and save the world.: Villains: Dr. Decoy and Bob
21	"Spaceship to Puzzlement"	Cape Canaveral/Outer space	May 11, 2001	121
The search for extra terrestrial life takes on new dimension when it becomes clear an alien is sabotaging the International space station. Miss Mallard and Willard follow the clues right up into space where they see the alien for themselves. But seeing is not necessarily believing, and Miss Mallard knows the real saboteur wants everyone to believe aliens are responsible. Now she just has to prove it.: Villain: Dr. Mandrake
22	"Stepping Stones to Gloom"	Seoul	May 18, 2001	122
Miss Mallard is an avid gardener so she's delighted when the famous botanist Dr. Yang Ho Long Duck invites her to be his special guest at the Seoul Flower Festival. Willard is less than pleased because of his allergies, which turn out to be a blessing when Dr. Yang Ho Long Duck's newest orchid is stolen. Willard's allergies help solve a very pungent mystery, one that will allow the villain to take over the entire world thanks to the smell of just one orchid.: Villain: Madame Pilét
23	"Ferris Wheel to Deceit"	Prague	June 1, 2001	123
The circus has come to Prague, and Willard and Miss Mallard with it. Priceless artifacts have been stolen from museums in all the big European cities. No one can explain how the thief gets through security; no one but Miss Mallard with the help of her nephew Willard. They soon learn the thefts occurred when the circus was in town and that mechanical ducks from the Fun House actually stole the artifacts. With that mystery solved, Miss Mallard and Willard turn to the real puzzling question: who programmed the mechanical ducks? It is an answer that would baffle even the most experienced of ducktectives, but not Miss Mallard.: Villain: Yuri Driver (Quack Quack the Clown)
24	"Footbridge to Jitters"	Philippines	September 17, 2001	124
Captain Blueduck, the notorious pirate, and his legendary lost treasure set the stage for mystery on the island of Jolo in the Philippine Islands. Miss Mallard and Willard seek refuge from a storm in a great banyan tree and become embroiled in a case involving the ghost of Captain Blueduck. It does not take long for Miss Mallard to realize the ghost is a fake, but then who is trying to scare a poor family from their home and why? Miss Mallard and Willard learn the surprising truth: the villain is not trying to scare the family away but to force them to stay. And when Miss Mallard finds the lost treasure, that s just what the family gets to do.: Villain: None
25	"Snowmobile to Panic"	Sweden	September 18, 2001	125
Is Santa Clausduck real? For Miss Mallard, everyone must make their own decision, and a mystery in Sweden's Lapland allows everyone to do just that. Someone is scaring away the elves and reindeer from a tourist attraction Santa's workshop. But is it just a tourist attraction or could this be the new home of the real Santa Clausduck? Christmas legends and myths from different countries blend together to help Miss Mallard and Willard solve a mystery that puts Christmas itself at risk.: Villain: Eva and Mush Mush
26	"Escalator to Agony"	Tokyo	September 19, 2001	126
Willard is a firm believer that technology will make life better and easier for everyone unless that technology goes on a rampage. The Tokyo technology fair is disrupted when a super robot goes haywire and it appears the robot's creator is responsible. Miss Mallard's old-fashioned detective skills, and her trusty clipping file, join forces with techno gizmos to prove the creator's innocence and point a wing at the real villain.: Villain: Hatsu Scoter, Robert Greenfeathers and Myron Scraup.

== See also ==
- Miss Marple, a preceding mystery-solver with similar name alliteration and choice of hats
