= Magic Brush =

1954 film by Jin Xi

- Directed by: Jin Xi (靳夕)
- Release dates: 1954; 1955
- Running time: 20 minutes
- Country: China
- Language: Mandarin

Magic Brush is a Chinese animated stop-motion film, based on a Chinese folktale, produced by the Shanghai Animation Film Studio. There were two versions of the film. In 1954 the first film was called "Ma Liang and his Magic Brush" (Chinese: 神筆馬良). In 1955 the second film was called "Magic Brush" (Chinese: 神筆). They are also interchangeably referred to as the "Magic Pen" or "Magical Pen".

== Plot ==
A young and kind peasant boy named Ma Liang cuts reeds and bamboo for the rich. He loves drawing and dreams of being an artist. As Ma Liang falls asleep one night after looking at his drawings, an elderly man appears in his dream and gives him a paintbrush. He says that the brush has great power and tells Ma Liang to use it wisely, then disappears. Ma Liang uses the brush to paint a rooster. When he paints the last feather, the rooster comes to life and flies away. Realizing the power of the brush, Ma Liang vows to use it to help others and remembers the words of the old man. Ma Liang paints rice and fish to help hungry people, which then become real.

The emperor finds out about the magic paintbrush. He visits Ma Liang and invites him to his home. Unknown to Ma Liang, the emperor is selfish and arrogant; he plans to steal the paintbrush and make a lot of money by creating valuable things with it and keeping them. When Ma Liang refuses to obey the emperor's command to paint a peacock for him, due to his promise to the old magician to use the brush wisely, he is imprisoned in a dungeon.

The emperor takes the paintbrush and shows it off to his friends, but when he draws pictures with it, they do not become real. Realizing in anger that the pictures would only become real when Ma Liang uses the magic paintbrush, the emperor offers Ma Liang his freedom if he paints a mountain of gold for him. To defeat the emperor's greed, Ma Liang devises a plan to trick him and agrees, telling the emperor to have patience and obey his words. He paints a sea much to the emperor's dismay but Ma Liang assures him that he is trying to make his work impressive. After the boy paints a golden mountain in the distance, the impressed emperor orders him to paint a ship for him and his men to gather the gold.

The emperor and his men hurry aboard the ship and sail towards the golden mountain. When they reach the middle of the sea, the emperor tells Ma Liang to paint wind to increase the ship's speed. Ma Liang paints a wind cloud and then continues to paint storm clouds. The horrified emperor calls out to Ma Liang to ease the weather, saying that he and his men and friends would die. But Ma Liang defies his orders and continues to paint more storm clouds. Giant waves crash against the ship, and the vessel breaks, sinking and drowning the emperor and his friends.

Ma Liang returns to his simple, happy life with his family. He is always ready to help everyone in need. Although he continues to paint more artworks, he only occasionally uses the magic paintbrush. Although the magic paintbrush is known by everyone, no one dares Ma Liang to use it for evil or greedy purposes.

== Adaptations ==
The story has been readapted a number of times by Chinese authors, common versions include the story of the same name from author Han Xing as well as Hong Xuntao. The American adaptation titled as "Tye May and the Magic Brush" by Molly Bang features a female protagonist as the title character.

- Brush: A Novel, written by Penn Anderson, (Penn Anderson, 2023). eBook and large print paperback.
- The Magic Paintbrush, written by Liz Miles, illustrated by Meilo So (Oxford University Press, 2011).
- The Magic Paintbrush, written by Jillian Powell (Wayland, 2011).
- The Magic Paintbrush, written by Julia Donaldson, illustrated by Joel Stewart (Igloo, Macmillan, 2004).
- The Magic Paintbrush, written by Laurence Yep, illustrated by Suling Wang (HarperCollins, 2000).
- The Magic Paintbrush, written by Robin Muller (Doubleday Canada, 1989).
- Tye May and the Magic Brush, by Molly Bang (HarperCollins, 1980).
- The Magic Paintbrush, adapted by Fran Hunia from the traditional tale, illustrated by Martin Aitchison (Ladybird Books, 1970s)
- Ma Lien and the Magic Brush, written by Hisako Kimishima, illustrated by Kei Wakana (Parents' Magazine Press, 1968)

== Awards ==
- Won the outstanding film award in the 1957 Poland Warsaw International Film Festival children's competition.
- Won the children's entertainment films award at the Venice, Italy 8th International Children's Film Festival
- Won the silver award at the Damascus, Syrian 1st International Film Festival Expo
- Won the outstanding children's film award at the Belgrade Yugoslavia 1st International Children's Film Festival
- Recognized at the Canada 2nd Stratford International Film Festival awards
- In 1955 awarded for outstanding film by China's Ministry of Culture.

== Creators ==
English Production	Original Version	Crew	Romanized
Director	編導	Jin Xi	靳夕
Technical Support	技術指導	Wang Thiau Jin	万超廑
Composer	作曲	Shande Ding	丁善德
Design	造型設計	Jin Xi	靳夕
Production Design	製作設計	Yu Zheguang	虞哲光
Set Design	布景設計	Wang Changcheng	王昌诚
Photography	攝影	Chaoquo Zhang; Kejun Zhao	章超群 赵克骏
Sound Recording	錄音	Zhenyu Miao	苗振宇
Assistant Director	副導演	Lei You	尤磊
Stunts	特技	Chen Tang Cheyou	陳增褔
Puppet Performers	木偶表演者	Xia Bingjun; Lei You; Zhou Manwei; Lu Heng	夏秉钧 尤磊 周曼玮 吕衡
Orchestra	演奏	Shanghai Film Symphony Orchestra	上海乐团交响乐队
Conducted by	指挥	Yijun Huang	黄贻钧

== See also ==
- List of stop-motion films
