= Robert Quackenbush =

American author and book illustrator (1929–2021)

- Born: Robert Mead Quackenbush; July 23, 1929; Los Angeles, California, U.S.
- Died: May 17, 2021 (aged 91); Manhattan, New York, U.S.
- Spouse: Margery Clouser (m. 1971)
- Writing career
- Genre: Children's literature
- Notable work: Henry's Awful Mistake
- Website: www.rquackenbush.com

Dr. Robert Mead Quackenbush, MSW, PhD (July 23, 1929 – May 17, 2021) was an American author and illustrator of children's books. He authored 110 books and illustrated 60 more by 1999. He is noted for creating the characters Henry the Duck, Detective Mole, and Miss Mallard.

== Early life ==
Quackenbush was born in Los Angeles on July 23, 1929. His ancestors immigrated to New York from the Netherlands during the 17th century. His father, Roy, worked as an engineer; his mother, Virginia (Arbogast), was employed as a secretary. He was raised in Phoenix, Arizona. His father died in a traffic collision several days before Christmas while on a business trip when Quackenbush was nine years old. The two feuded over an insignificant matter before his trip and Quackenbush assumed that it was related to his father's death. He went to a therapist to help alleviate his anguish and this consequently piqued his long-lasting interest in children's therapy and mental health.

After graduating from high school in 1947, Quackenbush spent a summer studying art at Parsons School of Design. He initially attended Phoenix College, but opted not to continue his studies and worked towards a career in art instead. He subsequently enrolled in the ArtCenter College of Design in 1948. Two years later, he was chosen in the Selective Service draft and joined the US Army to fight in the Korean War. He was stationed in South Carolina and Indiana, where he continued his art by painting watercolor portraits of his fellow soldiers and officers. Quackenbush was honorably discharged in 1953, with his G.I. Bill helping him finish his studies at the ArtCenter. He graduated with a Bachelor of Fine Arts in 1956, before relocating to New York.

== Career ==
Quackenbush first worked as creative director for Scandinavian Airlines. During a summer stint in Stockholm, he came across the mediums of woodcuts, etchings, and lithography, and took a particular interest in woodcuts. He consequently quit his corporate job upon returning to New York and went into printmaking. He was commissioned by the New York Hilton Midtown, National Parks Division, and the National Air and Space Museum, and his prints were exhibited in places like the Whitney Museum of American Art. He then worked in illustrating, first with magazines and later with books. He was commissioned by Henry Holt and Company in 1962 to illustrate "The Steadfast Tin Soldier" by Hans Christian Andersen. After illustrating 62 books by other authors, he decided to author and illustrate his personal work, starting with Old MacDonald Had a Farm in 1972. He started writing the Henry the Duck stories around the time his son was born in 1974 to ease any taunting he would receive because of his surname. Quackenbush recounted how he had been nicknamed "Quack" while he was serving in the Army. He did not want his son to go through the same experience and dedicated every book to him, adding how "after that, nobody made fun of him and his last name".

Quackenbush authored and illustrated over 200 books. He created the characters Detective Mole, Miss Mallard, and Pete Pack Rat. His most widely-known book, Henry's Awful Mistake, was published by Parents Magazine Press in 1980. It ultimately featured in almost 900 US and Canadian libraries. He was conferred the Edgar Allan Poe Award in 1982 for best juvenile mystery with Detective Mole and the Halloween Mystery. Two decades later, his books on Miss Mallard were adapted into an animated television series, A Miss Mallard Mystery, that was premiered in 2000, but produced by the Montreal-based children's entertainment company.

During his sixties, Quackenbush returned to school, obtaining a master's degree in social work from Fordham University. He was later awarded a Doctor of Philosophy in childhood development and children's education. He then practiced as a licensed psychoanalyst at his East 78th Street studio, where he also taught painting to children after school and held workshops for adults about authoring children's books.

== Selected works ==
- Henry's Awful Mistake (1980)
- Henry's Important Date (1981)
- Henry Babysits (1983)
- Don't You Dare Shoot That Bear!: A Theodore Roosevelt Story (1984)
- Sherlock Chick's First Case (1986)
- Sherlock Chick and the Peekaboo Mystery (1987)
- Too Many Ducklings: A Henry the Duck Adventure (1987)
- Dogsled to Dread: A Miss Mallard Mystery (1988)
- Sherlock Chick and the Giant Egg Mystery (1989)
- Sherlock Chick and the Case of the Night Noises (1990)
- Quackenbush's Treasury of Humor (1990)
- Taxi to Intrigue: A Miss Mallard Mystery (1991)
- Daughter of Liberty (1999)
- Batbaby Finds a Home (2001)
- Henry Goes West (2007)
- First Grade Jitters (2010)
- Express Train to Trouble: A Miss Mallard Mystery (2018)
- Stairway to Doom: A Miss Mallard Mystery (2018)
- Texas Trail to Calamity: A Miss Mallard Mystery (2018)
- Bicycle to Treachery: A Miss Mallard Mystery (2019)
- Henry's World Tour (2021)

== Personal life and death ==
Quackenbush married Margery Clouser in 1971. They met after she walked into his studio while he was authoring and illustrating Old MacDonald Had a Farm. She was one of the inspirations for Miss Mallard, whose given name was also Margery and wore a brim hat like her. Together, they had one child (Piet). They remained married until his death.

Quackenbush died on May 17, 2021, at his home in Manhattan. He was 91, and suffered from leukemia prior to his death.

== Awards ==
- American Flag Institute Award for outstanding contributions to children's literature – four-time winner
- Edgar Allan Poe Special Award for best juvenile mystery for his book Detective Mole and the Halloween Mystery (1982).
- Gradiva Award for Batbaby, voted best children's book of 1998 by NAAP
