= The Fight Between the Snipe and the Clam =

- Traditional Chinese: 鷸蚌相爭
- Simplified Chinese: 鹬蚌相争
- Literal meaning: Snipe and clam fight each other
- Hanyu Pinyin: Yù Bàng Xiāng Zhēng
- Directed by: Hu Jinqing
- Written by: Gu Hanchang; Mo Du
- Edited by: Zhong Mopu
- Music by: Duan Shijun
- Distributed by: Shanghai Animation Film Studio
- Release date: 1983
- Running time: 10 minutes
- Country: China
- Language: none

The Fight Between the Snipe and the Clam (Chinese: 鹬蚌相争; pinyin: Yù Bàng Xiāng Zhēng), also translated as Snipe–Clam Grapple, is a 1983 Chinese animated short film directed by Hu Jinqing and produced by the Shanghai Animation Film Studio. It won the Silver Bear for Best Short Film at the Berlin International Film Festival in February 1984. The film combines painted and cutout animation.

== Background ==
The film is based on the Chinese proverb "in the fight between the snipe and the clam, the fisherman has the best of it".

== Plot ==
A clam is sitting out in the sun when suddenly a snipe flies down to peck at it. The clam slams its shells shut, gripping the snipe's beak in between. The snipe says, "If it doesn't rain today, and it doesn't rain tomorrow, I shall see a dead clam on the beach." The clam retorts, "If I don't open today, and I don't open up tomorrow, I shall see a dead snipe on the beach." While they are grappling with each other, a fisherman passes by and nets them both.

== Credits ==
Screenwriters	Gu Hanchang; Mo Du	顾汉昌 墨犊
Director	Hu Jinqing	胡进庆
Art Design	Lu Ruhao	陆汝浩
Animation Design	Ge Guiyun; Wu Yunchu; Zha Kan; Lu Songmao	葛桂云 吴云初 查侃 陆松茂
Photography	Geng Kang	耿康
Character Drawing	Yue Huimin; Gong Jinfu	岳慧敏 龚金福
Painted Scene	Wu Zhongwen	伍仲文
Composer	Duan Shijun	段时俊
Effects	Bai Weimin	白伟民
Recording	Zhan Lei	詹磊
Editing	Mo Puzhong	莫普忠
Conductor	Song Guanghai	宋光海
Played by	Shanghai Film Orchestra	上海电影乐团

== See also ==
- Chinese animation
