= Lu Chunling =

- Born: September 14, 1921
- Died: May 22, 2018 (aged 96)

Lu Chunling (simplified Chinese: 陆春龄; traditional Chinese: 陸春齡; pinyin: Lù Chūnlíng; Wade–Giles: Lu Ch'un-ling; 14 September 1921 – 22 May 2018) was a Chinese dizi player and music educator.

Lu learnt how to play pipa and dizi from a neighbour, who was an amateur musician, in his childhood. He left school at about 15, and worked a taxi driver then a trishaw driver. Meantime, he was still learning from the local noted sizhu players. He continued his car driver job after 1949, for the PLA. He was well known for his artistry as a dizi soloist in the Shanghai Folk Ensemble (then Shanghai Traditional Orchestra) since 1952. He began to teach at the Shanghai Conservatory of Music in 1957, and became Associate Professor in 1978.

Lu was considered as a leading exponent of southern Chinese dizi (qudi) music, after 1949. Along with Ma Shenglong, Zhou Hao and Zhou Hui, they formed a Jiangnan sizhu music quartet, which was influential among contemporary Chinese music. His compositions include Jinxi (今昔, Today and Yesterday) and Jiangnanchun (江南春, South Yangtze In The Spring Time). The animated short film The Cowboy's Flute which published in 1963, is soundtracked by him.
