= Music Up =

Chinese animated television series

- Created by: Jie Yan Yan; Ceng Wei; Lu Yingzhe
- Screenplay by: Xiang Hua; Jie Yan Yan; Ceng Wei
- Directed by: Hu Yihong
- Voices of: Zhang Cheng; Ye Qishan; Li Ye; Shen Lei; Feng Junhua; Sun Ye; Tao Hai; Zhang Hui; Xu Huayan; Shen Dawei; Li Wei; Wu Xiaoyan
- Theme music composer: Peng Cheng
- Opening theme: "My Stage" by Tiger Hu and the Inspirational Band
- Composer: Peng Cheng
- Country of origin: China
- Original language: Mandarin
- No. of episodes: 52

Production
- Editor: Qiang Xiaobai
- Running time: 22 mins
- Production companies: Shanghai Animation Film Studio; Shanghai Television; Welkin-Animation

Original release
- Network: Shanghai Television; CCTV
- Release: August 6 – August 31, 2001 (first 26 episodes); 2002 (last 26 episodes)

Music Up (Chinese: 我为歌狂), also known as Crazy for the Song, is the first Chinese animated (alternatively known as a Donghua) idol series in China. It was distributed by Shanghai Animation Film Studio and produced by Welkin-Animation.

A sequel, Music Up: Reborn (我为歌狂 第二季) is released in early October 2020.

== Background ==
This is the first animation production from China with an emphasis on the life of singers, bands and pop stars. It is the first high budget domestic Chinese animation. Production investment is estimated to be 18 million RMB (about US $2.3 million). In 2001 66% of its profits came from selling merchandise related to the series.

== Story ==
Four young teenage boys share a common vision and passion for music. They come together overlapping their own personalities and ideas. In the process, they encounter a lot of difficulties as any youth might have. The story is unfolded as the band grows up. Academic, personal conflicts, family, friendship and emotional problems are all intertwined. With the help of teachers, students, and friends they try to achieve their dreams.

== Merchandise ==
The TV series was not as successful as expected, but the associated merchandise of books, cards, CDs were extremely popular among teenagers in China. The book series sold 350,000 copies in Shanghai alone. A video game was released in 2002 by UbiSoft China titled "Music Up - Summer Rainbow".

== See also ==
- Slam Dunk
