= Shuke and Beita =

Chinese series of animation

- 舒克和贝塔
- Genre: Fairy tale, Adventure
- Created by: Zheng Yuanjie (original work)
- Based on: The Adventures of Shuke and Beita (《舒克和贝塔历险记》)
- Written by: Yao Zhongli, Nie Xinru, Zhang Zhiyuan
- Directed by: Yan Dingxian, Lin Wenxiao, Hu Yihong et al.
- Starring: Fan Jie (voice of Shuke), Zhai Wei (voice of Beita)
- Theme music composer: Jin Fuzai
- Composer: Jin Fuzai
- Country of origin: China
- Original language: Mandarin
- No. of episodes: 13

Production
- Production company: Shanghai Animation Film Studio

Original release
- Network: CCTV
- Release: September 14, 1992 – December 1992

Shuke and Beita is a series of animation produced by the Shanghai Animation Film Studio, adapted from the long wonder tale The Adventures of Shuke and Beita (舒克和贝塔历险记) by Zheng Yuanjie. Directed by Yan Dingxian, Lin Wenxiao, and others, the series narrates the adventures of two mice: Shuke "the Pilot" and Beita "the Tankist", as they embark on adventures in the real world. The series spans 13 episodes, produced as animated series from 1989 to 1992.

In the 1990s, this animated series aired on CCTV's program Animation City.

On July 24, 2020, a remastered version of the animation was released.

== Characters ==
=== Main characters ===
- Shuke the Pilot - Shuke is a gentle, intelligent, brave, and idealistic little mouse who sets out on adventures to escape the bad reputation of mice. He often flies a helicopter to help various animals.
- Beita the Tankist - Beta is a kind, generous, carefree, and pragmatic little mouse who enjoys helping others and has a liking for drinking gasoline (in the original, it was alcohol). He may also have a fear of heights. Beta is brave and skilled in battle, and he is Shuke's most friendly and loyal companion.

=== Others ===
- Pipilu – A human boy and a friend of Shuke and Beta. He appears in other works by Zheng Yuanjie, and later becomes a physicist.
- Bailu – A half-mechanical mouse who uses "electromagic" to intimidate a group of cats and becomes the King of the Kingdom of Chris (Cat Kingdom). He loves eating cat meat.
- Feifei – A female mouse. Bailu, whose heart is as cold as ice, wanted to make her the queen, but Feifei rejected the offer.
- Luoqiu – A fat mouse, a companion of Shuke and Beta, and the catering manager of Shuke and Beta's airline. He was tragically killed during a battle with pirates.
- Chouqiu – A companion of Shuke and Beta and the mechanic for Shuke and Beta's airline.
- Mili – A pink female cat who enjoys bullying Beta. After Beta defeats her with his tank, they reconcile.
- Dahua – A blue male cat and Mimi's older brother. He often bullies smaller animals and initially believes all mice are thieves. Eventually, he reconciles with Shuke and Beta.
- "The Pirate" – A one-eyed mouse and the antagonist in the animation, who plots to attack Shuke and Beta's airline.
- Mouse King – The ruler of the mouse city where Shuke and Beta live. He first appears in Episode 13, trying to poison human food with rodenticide, but Shuke and Beta stop him.
- Junior Roqiu – Roqiu's son.
- Touban – Chouqiu's twin brother. He grew up in a newspaper office and understands journalism and publishing. He plays a key role in the resistance against the Mouse King.
