= Baby Follies =

- Baby Follies; Bebés em Festa; Locuras de Bebés; Tír na hÓige
- Genre: children's animated series
- Created by: Serge Rosenzweig; Claude Prothée
- Written by: Serge Rosenzweig; Claude Prothée
- Voices of: Marine Boiron; Jean-Pierre Denys; Antoine Doignon; Jean-Claude Donda; Pierre Laurent; Marie-Christine Robert
- Theme music composer: Xavier Cobo, Gérald Olivieri
- Country of origin: France
- Original language: French
- No. of seasons: 1
- No. of episodes: 52

Production
- Executive producer: Antoine Maestrati
- Running time: 26 minutes
- Production companies: C2A; Les Cartooneurs Associés; Shanghai Animation Film Studio

Original release
- Network: Canal+
- Release: November 29, 1993 – 1994

Baby Follies was a French children's animated series first broadcast in 1993–94. Produced by C2A and France 2, co-created by Serge Rosenzweig and Claude Prothee. It was filmed in 52 x 13' format. It was directed by Denis Olivieri and featured music by Gérald Olivieri and Xavier Cobo. Other credits are provided by Antoine Maestrati as executive producer. Likewise, it had the collaboration of Centre National de la Cinematographie, Canal+, and financial support of the French Ministry of National Education as well as the Ministry of Culture.

== Plot ==
Baby City is a city where babies have adventures before storks come to take them to the world of adults.

== International broadcast ==
Baby Folies was dubbed into several languages:

- Baby Follies (English, USA, UK)
- Baby Follies (Spanish, Latin America)
- Bebés em Festa (”Babies At Party”, Portuguese) (Somnorte, 1996)
- Bebés em Festa (”Babies At Party”, Portuguese) (Ediberto Lima Produções, 1998)
- Bobaskowo ("Baby-doll", Polish)
- Locuras de Bebés ("Baby Crazy", Spanish, Spain)
- Tír na hÓige ("The Land Of Youth", Irish)
- תינוקות בצמרת (Tinokot BaTzameret, "Babies At The Top", “The City Of Babies”, Israel)
- 婴儿城 / 嬰兒城 (Yīng'ér Chéng, "Baby City", Chinese)
- شهر بچه‌ها ("The City Of Babies", Persian)
- ”Baby Boom” (German)
- තොත්ත බබාලා (“Totta Babies”, “Babies”, Sinhala)
- Baby Follies (Russian)
- Shumtakalar (Uzbek)
- مدينة الاطفال (Children’s City, Arabic)
- Krutskivennad (The Mischief Brothers, Estonian)

== List Of Episodes ==
- 1. Tétine de la fortune
- 2. Scrutin pour un galopin
- 3. Nounours connection
- 4. Concerto pour un canard
- 5. Bébé Sigmund est un génie
- 6. Love stories à Baby City
- 7. De l'eau dans le lolo
- 8. L'émeute de Noël
- 9. Bébé Albert et Mister Lolo
- 10. Le retour de bébé Diogène
- 11. Le mondial de Baby City
- 12. Le Bébé crooner show
- 13. Mystère Mystère et boule de Noël
- 14. Opération pâté de nuage
- 15. Bébé Boggy blues
- 16. La malédiction du démon vert
- 17. Vive le sport
- 18. Ouragan sur Super Biberon
- 19. L'enfance de l'art
- 20. Air Biberon
- 21. Baby Air Force
- 22. Trop poli pour être Papone
- 23. Promotion sur les bébés
- 24. Tétine en orbite
- 25. Un nounours dans le tiroir
- 26. Uppercut premier âge
- 27. La nuit des bébés d'or
- 28. Les bébés s'en vont en guerre
- 29. Super héros à la pelle
- 30. Réquisitions en chaîne
- 31. Bébé Narque va trop loin
- 32. La grande parade
- 33. Coup de tête pour Hyper Baby
- 34. Dow Jones Junio à la baisse
- 35. Brelan de galopins
- 36. Règlement de comptes à Hochet Baby
- 37. Bébé Emile met dans le mille
- 38. 100.000 tétines au soleil
- 39. Aux urnes les bébés
- 40. Le grand rallye de Baby City
- 41. Nounours Kong
- 42. La fièvre monte à Baby City
- 43. Bébés volants non identifiés
- 44. Bébé Jedi et Arrheu D2
- 45. Baby Lauren, star dans le vent
- 46. Dure, dure, la vie de star
- 47. Lolautoroute à péage
- 48. Les grands travaux
- 49. Toujours prêt mon bébé
- 50. Couches dirigeantes dans la tourmente
- 51. La médaille
- 52. Le procès de Srogneugneu
