= Shanghai Animation Space =

Museum in Shanghai, China

Shanghai Animation Space is a museum operated by Shanghai Film Group. Located at No 618 Wanhangdu Road in Shanghai's Jing'an district, it is located on the former site of the Shanghai Animation Film Studio. It opened in June, 2026.

Descrived as "not a traditional museum", the Shanghai Animation Space combines exhibitions, immersive technology, and interactive experiences, including use of XR technology. The venue also includes a cinema room and a flagship store.
