= Dai Tielang =

Singaporean-born Chinese animator (1930–2019)

- Born: Guo Bin; 17 October 1930; Singapore, Straits Settlements
- Died: 4 September 2019 (aged 88); Hangzhou, Zhejiang, China
- Occupation: director of animated films
- Years active: 1980–1993

Chinese name
- Traditional Chinese: 戴鐵郎
- Simplified Chinese: 戴铁郎
Transcriptions
Standard Mandarin
- Hanyu Pinyin: Dài Tiěláng

Dai Tielang (Chinese: 戴铁郎; born Guo Bin; 17 October 1930 – 4 September 2019) was a Singaporean-born Chinese animator and a pioneering figure of Chinese animation during the 1950s and the 60s, best known for directing Black Cat Detective.

Born in Singapore in 1930, Dai was brought to China in 1940. After graduating from the Beijing Film Academy in 1953, he worked at the Shanghai Animation Film Studio.

Dai's father, Dai Langying was a native of Huiyang. He was a painter, and began to work in Singapore in the 1930s.

== Works ==
- Little Tadpoles Looking for Mummy (1960)
- A Deer of Nine Colors (1981)
- Black Cat Detective (1984–1987)

== Death ==
He died on 4 September 2019.
