= A Deer of Nine Colors =

- Directed by: Qian Jiajun; Dai Tielang
- Written by: Pan Jiezi
- Production company: Shanghai Animation Film Studio
- Release date: 1981
- Running time: 30 minutes
- Country: China
- Language: Mandarin

A Deer of Nine Colors (Chinese: 九色鹿; pinyin: Jiǔ Sè Lù) is a story based on the Buddhist Jataka tale. In 1981, it was adapted into an animated film of the same name by Shanghai Animation Film Studio. It is also referred to as The Nine Colored Deer.

== Background ==
The Deer King, known as RuRu in the 2nd century BCE in the Bharhut region of India, was one of the benevolent birds and beasts that the Buddha reincarnated in his previous life to do good deeds.

The "Deer King Jataka painting" is the main theme of the fresco in the 257th cave of the Mogao Grottoes, which was created in the Northern Wei dynasty. The Jataka story refers to the many deeds experienced by the founder of Buddhism, Sakyamuni, before his death. The "Buddha's Birth Story" tells the story of Sakyamuni's previous life as the "Deer King," who saved a drowning man and was betrayed by him. The story advocates justice, praises great and noble virtues, condemns ungrateful and evil souls, and further promotes the idea that good is rewarded and evil is punished.

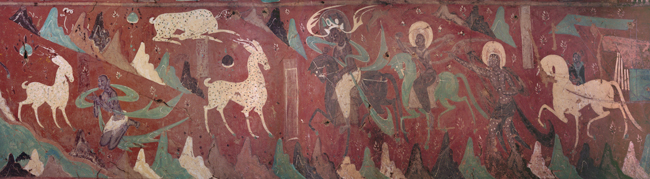
Deer King Jataka painting, Mogao Cave 257 west wall center

The Deer King Jataka painting adopts the form of a horizontal sequential comic strip, starting from the two ends and ending in the middle. It blends Chinese and Western artistic techniques, appearing as if painted on a scroll in the traditional Chinese aesthetic, while using shading to highlight the human figures. The first scene on the left shows the nine-coloured deer saving a drowning man. In the picture, a man is depicted riding on the back of the deer, holding onto its neck as the deer carried him out of water. The next image shows the man being rescued kneeling in front of the deer, promising to keep the secret. The first scene on the right shows the queen flirting with the king asking him to make an outfit with the deer’s skin. In the picture, the king and the queen are sitting in the palace. The queen is turning her head towards the king while hugging him with her right arm and her foot pointing outwards. Outside, the man informs the king of the location of the deer. In the immediate next scene, the king and the queen was in the chariot led by the ungrateful man. In the middle of the picture, the group met the deer, and the deer is telling the story of the ungrateful man. Behind the king’s entourage, the betrayer’s body is covered with white sores. The carriage in this painting is the earliest image of carriages among Dunhuang murals. It is a passenger carriage with double shafts and wheels, pulled by a single horse. It featured a fully-closed hood and a round, bow-shaped cover. The horse is advancing with elegance, showing the nobility of the royals, and the shape of the carriage is also very delicate and unique. Decorations on the carriage are not too luxurious, maybe because it was used for hunting in the mountains.

== Original story ==
In ancient times, a Persian merchant gets lost in a great windstorm. Suddenly, though, a spiritual deer of nine colors appears to guide the man. Later, the deer rescues a man drowning in a lake. In exchange, the man promises not to reveal the deer's whereabouts. The man reaches an imperial palace. The king insists on hunting down the spiritual deer to make clothes out of the deer skin. The man gives in to his greed and leads an army of warriors to the spot. He falls into the river again, hoping the deer will show up to rescue him. This time, all the warriors' arrows turn into dust and the man is drowned.

== Animated plot ==
The film expands on the story. The deer is first seen rescuing small animals and insects when the tree they live in is blown down in a storm. The deer guides them to safety and persuades flowers to bloom out of season so the bees will have food. Then the deer saves a party of traveling merchants who have lost their way by magically moving the mountains to make a clear path for them. The story that a magical nine-colored deer has come to the country begins to spread among the people. Meanwhile, a man who sells medicinal spells and cures for snakebite is gathering herbs and falls into a lake. He is rescued by the deer and promises not to reveal its whereabouts. However, the vain queen of the land has also heard of the nine-colored deer and begins to pout and sulk, demanding a coat made from its fur. The king posts a huge reward for anyone who can tell him where to find it, and the potion merchant at once decides to betray his vow of secrecy and lead the king's hunters to the deer. The birds who were rescued are terrified and rush to the deer begging it to flee, but the deer is serene, saying it cannot be killed. The potion merchant pretends to be drowning again to bring the deer to the lake, but when it is surrounded and the hunters fire, the deer manifests a halo of divine light and sacred symbols surround it. The arrows turn to dust. The warriors all stand ashamed as the deer berates the potion merchant for his unfaithfulness and greed, and birds fly around him striking the man with pecks until he sinks into the lake.

== See also ==
- Princess Mononoke, features the Great Forest Spirit, a deer-like animal god by day, that is hunted by the emperor's troops
- Sky (video game), a 2019 mobile game that features an adaptation of the film's story as the basis for the in-game "Season of the Nine-Colored Deer."
- Valt the Wonder Deer, a 2017 American-Chinese animated series inspired by the original tale, and also features a Nine-Colored Deer character.
