= Big Ear Tutu =

Chinese cartoon television series

Hu Tutu, also known as Big Ear Tutu

Big Ear Tutu (Chinese: 大耳朵图图) is a Chinese cartoon television series. Its main character is Hu Tutu, a young boy with very large ears. The boy (also known as Big Ear Tutu) is inquisitive and energetic. Often his curiosity drives the plot of the episode. His vivid imagination is especially part of his personality. He often learns from his mother and father, with whom he has a good relationship.

The series was nominated for the 23rd Golden Eagle Awards. It is popular among preschool age children in China.

The main character is also featured in books and comics.

== Plot summary ==
Hu Tutu is a smart, naughty and smart four-year-old child. He is naturally happy and kind-hearted. He likes to be nosy, energetic, and he is curious about the things around him, and has his own unique insights and imagination. His words and deeds often surprise people. His favorite person is the beautiful girl Xiaomei. The person he dislikes the most is the eighteen-month-old baby Douding. The person he admires the most is his five-year-old friend Zhuang Zhuang, who he likes to imitate.

Tutu's mother is a good cook and is considered by Tutu to be the most beautiful mother in the world. She is also an emotional mother.

Tutu's father has the same charming ears as Tutu. He has a cheerful and carefree personality and loves to sing but often goes out of tune.

The monster is a colorful kitten on a white background. Because it was magical to eat only vegetables, Tutu called it a little monster. As ordinary and naughty as Tutu, he can talk, but only Tutu knows about it.

Xiaomei is a beautiful girl who is three months older than Tutu. She loves to be beautiful and her crush is Tutu.

Zhang Shuaizi was called Brush by the confused Tutu because of the homophonic pronunciation and because of his unruly hair. Brush therefore became enemies with Tutu and teased Tutu in every possible way until he discovered that Tutu, like her, did not eat tomatoes. The two just became friends.

Da Zhuang comes from a wealthy family, is smart and mature, and is a child with a high IQ. He often speaks in adult terms, and his colloquial words are: "As far as I know", "Absolutely..." Tutu admires him very much.

Brother Jianjian is Tutu’s class teacher. He is a big boy who is not yet married. He is very energetic and loves children. His goal and slogan for the children in his class is "be strong and brave". Although Tutu and Brush caused him a lot of trouble, he didn't blame them.

== Series ==
year	Series	Broadcast Channels
2004	season 1	CCTV-14
2006	season 2	CCTV-14
2008	season 3	CCTV-14
2010	season 4	CCTV-14

== Award records ==
- The 23rd China TV Golden Eagle Award for Best Choreographer and Director
- The 23rd China TV Golden Eagle Award for Outstanding Feature-length Art Film
- The "Series of Serials" at the 2008 China International Animation Festival Monkey Award for the United States
- 2009 Publicity Department of the Chinese Communist Party the Best Works Award
- Best Animated Television Film, China Culture and Arts Government Award for Animation

== Derivatives Development ==
- In 2006, the derivatives of Big Ear Tutu had not yet established a complete industrial chain, and the related dolls, videos and books were still in the drafting stage and had not yet been implemented
- In 2008, another children's play, Big Ears Tutu Halloween Dream Adventure, was staged at the Shanghai Grand Theatre.
- In 2009, Big Ear Tutu was the first accessible animated film to be screened at the Shanghai School for Blind Children.
- In 2022, in the animation promotional film "China's Ice and Snow Expansion (Season 2)" - "Walking with Ice and Snow to the Future", 8 well-known classic characters of Shanghai Animation Film Studio, including Big Ears Tutu, and the "dream" of ice and snow sports "Linkage", calling on all people to participate in ice and snow sports and "move towards the future" together.

== Introduction of Taiwan ==
Taiwan TV station operators hope to introduce "Big Ear Tutu" in August 2008, subject to review by Government Information Office. During the 12th Shanghai International Film Festival, the mainland animation character "Big Ear Tutu" and the Taiwanese animation character YOYOMAN appeared together on the stage of the "Night of the Sea Film", which is the first cross-strait animation image cooperation and co-production of an animation series.
