= Zheng Yuanjie =

Chiese writer

- 郑渊洁
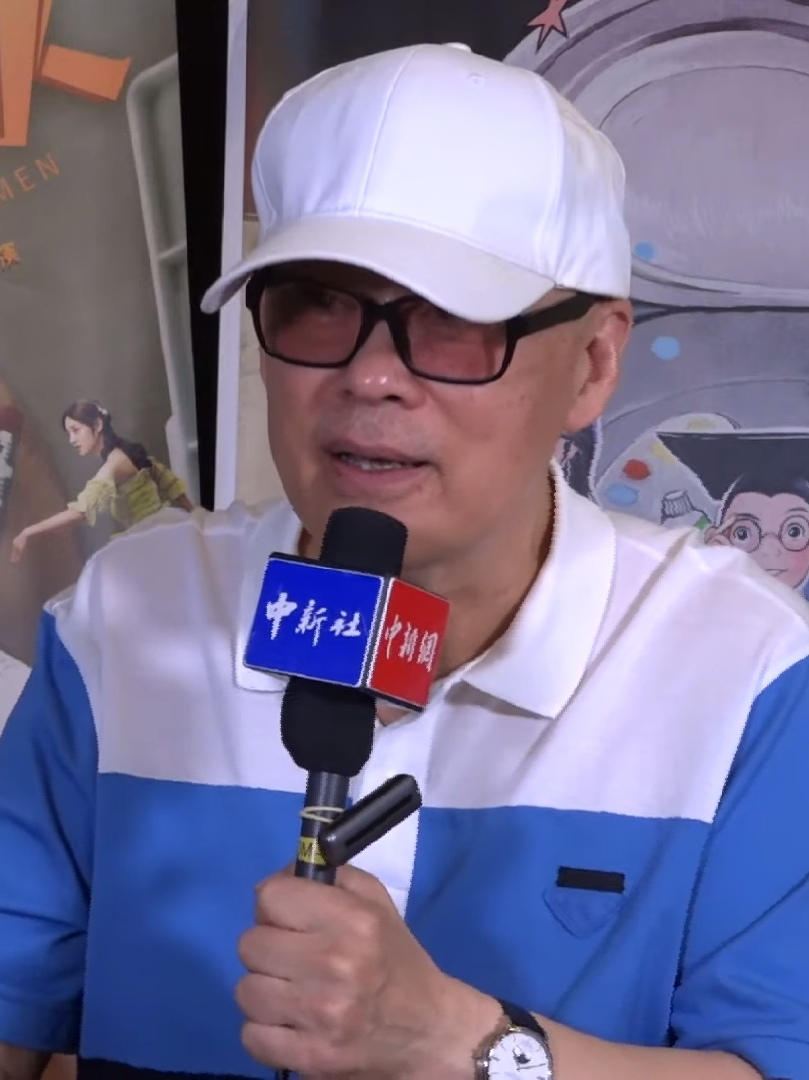
- Born: 15 June 1955 (age 71); Shijiazhuang, Hebei, China
- Occupation: Writer
- Spouse: Guo Weiwei (郭维维)
- Children: Zheng Yaqi (郑亚旗); Zheng Yafei (郑亚飞)
- Writing career
- Language: Chinese
- Period: 1979–present

Zheng Yuanjie
- Traditional Chinese: 鄭淵潔
- Simplified Chinese: 郑渊洁
Transcriptions
Standard Mandarin
- Hanyu Pinyin: Zhèng Yuānjié

Zheng Yuanjie (Chinese: 郑渊洁; born 15 June 1955) is a Chinese children's books author, and founder and sole writer of a children's literature magazine known as the King of Fairy Tales (童话大王). The first issue was published in 1984. His characters (including PiPilu, LuXixi, Shuke, Beita and Luoke) are registered trademarks.

== View ==
Zheng Yuanjie is critical of conventional Chinese methods of education, claiming that "college education tends to make simple things complicated and hard to understand".

== Works ==
- Pipilu and Luxixi
- The Adventures of Shuke and Beita
- Big Bad Wolf Rocco
- The Magic Cube Mansion
