= Mr. Black: Green Star =

- Theatrical release poster
- 黑猫警长之翡翠之星
- Directed by: Shengjun Yu; Xuegang Shi; Song Qing; Yi Shi
- Production companies: Shanghai Film Group; Shanghai Animation Film Studio; Fengwei (Shanghai) Entertainment; Beijing Weiying Shidai Technology
- Release date: 7 August 2015
- Running time: 83 minutes
- Country: China
- Language: Mandarin
- Box office: CN¥70 million

Mr. Black: Green Star (Chinese: 黑猫警长之翡翠之星) is a 2015 Chinese animated science fiction action comedy film directed by Shengjun Yu, Xuegang Shi, Song Qing and Yi Shi. It is based on the Chinese Black Cat Detective animated series, and was released on 7 August 2015.

== Plot ==
The movie begins with a shot of the prison in which One-ear mouse is being locked up. However, a meteor storm damages the prison, allowing One-ear mouse to get away. He is chased down by officers and cornered off but falls into a crater made by one of the meteors. Suddenly, a giant ape comes out of the crater and starts beating up the police officers. Just then, the duck dude comes and brings with him a whole squad of cat officers who then begin singing in order to introduce the main character: Inspector Black. Inspector Black Cat tries to get the ape to surrender but he gets away.

== Themes ==
This movie tells the story of One Ear who escapes from prison and plans to use the flying aerospace museum "Emerald Star" with the great ape with super powers to exile the entire city's residents to the universe. Sheriff Black Cat wants to protect the city and stop the bad guys. action.

== Voice cast ==
- Lu Zhao as Black Cat Detective
- Tian Hao Wu as One-Ear Mouse
- Zijie Lin as Mu Sandu
- Ying Liu as Theta / Mom
- Yuzhu Cheng as Dr. Great Ape
- Chuanying Li as Duck Officer
- Jia Zhan
- Dian Tao
- Jiajia Shi
- Shengjun Yu

== Reception ==
The film earned CN¥69.915 million at the Chinese box office.
