= After School (1972 film) =

- Directed by: Yan Dingxian (严定宪)
- Production company: Shanghai Animation Film Studio
- Release date: 1972
- Running time: 1 reel
- Country: China
- Language: Mandarin

After School (Chinese: 放学以后) is a 1972 Chinese animated short film.

== Background ==
The film was produced and released under the term of chairman Mao Zedong when the Cultural Revolution was still ongoing. As with other animated films of the era, it had a class struggle theme. The plot backdrop is an elementary school. A story book was also released as a companion to the film.

== Story ==
While "Little Red Guard" elementary student Li Guohua is leading a group of students putting up Cultural Revolution posters, fellow student Shen Xiaogang runs in to say that some young girls were outside skipping rope and singing a song about eating candy and the uselessness of reading revolutionary books. After talking to the girls, Li Guohua discovers that they were taught the song by a candy seller (Huang Yilang). This is a serious matter, so they all decide to report it to their teacher. The teacher and students then talk to a revolutionary leader named Zhou Dabo. Zhou lectures the children on the history of class struggle in China. The girls promise not to listen to such songs again and to follow Mao Zedong's teachings.

A little later, another student reports that the candy seller has been telling fantasy and ghost tales to other students. Yet another student reports that the candy seller is saying life in the countryside is miserable and they should not go out there to learn. The students eventually surround and denounce Huang Yilang when he returns to the school to sell candy and teach songs.

== Sources ==
- 放学以后 / 上海电影制片厂《放学以后》摄制组编画 [After School / Shanghai Movie Studio Film Pictures Story Book] (in Chinese). Shanghai: 上海人民出版社. 1972.
- China Movie Material Institute, ed. (1981). 中国艺术影片编目 (1949-1979) [China Art Film Catalog (1949-1979)] (in Chinese). Beijing: Culture and Arts Press.
