= Black Cat Detective =

- 黑猫警长 Hēi Māo Jǐng Zhǎng
- Genre: Drama; Science fantasy
- Based on: Black Cat Detective Manhua by Zhu Zhixiang
- Directed by: Dai Tielang
- Voices of: Shi Dongmin; Yang Wenyuan; Yang Yutian; Fan Leiying; Zhan Che; Wang Wei; Huang Xiang; Wu Erpu
- Music by: Zhu Gang; An Ping; Shen Xiaocen
- Country of origin: China
- Original language: Mandarin
- No. of episodes: 5

Production
- Producer: Yin Xiyong
- Production location: Shanghai China
- Animator: Dai Tielang
- Running time: 20 minutes
- Production company: Shanghai Animation Film Studio

Original release
- Network: CCTV
- Release: 1984 – 1987

Black Cat Detective (traditional Chinese: 黑貓警長; simplified Chinese: 黑猫警长; pinyin: Hēimāo Jǐngzhǎng, lit. "Black Cat Sheriff") is a Chinese animated television series based on a 1982 manhua written by Zhu Zhixiang produced by the Shanghai Animation Film Studio. It is sometimes shortened as Mr. Black. The main character, Black Cat Detective, was created by Zhu Zhixiang (诸志祥).

During the middle of the 1980s to this day, China had a zero-tolerance against crime, which inspired the themes of the series and also at the time the series was a popular among Chinese children and adult audiences alike. The series was also dubbed in Japanese as Kuro Neko Keibu (黒ネコ警部).

Sheriff Black Cat is a police officer and his duty is to protect citizens. He has a righteous, brave and heroic demeanor. Sheriff Black Cat is a cute and clever Chinese classic cartoon character. An unsmiling police sergeant.

The early 1980s when "Black Cat Sheriff" was born coincided with the "Strike Hard" period. At that time, prison vans were used to escort death row prisoners and parade along the streets. The purpose of shock was self-evident. The righteous image of Sheriff Black Cat and the story of the forest police officers fighting various evil forces in the film were all refracted and influenced by the social atmosphere at that time.

== Premise and plot ==
The story takes place in a forest, where the Black Cat Detective wanders around on his motorcycle stopping villains. Cases range from clashing with mice and other characters.

=== The White Cat ===
The White Cat Squad Leader is a character who appears in the domestic cartoon "Black Cat Sheriff", the squad leader of the Forest Police Department and the most capable officer of Sheriff Black Cat, who has made great achievements in many cases. In the cat-and-mouse case, to protect the key to the archives room, he was brutally persecuted by One-Eared Uncle Cat-Mouse and died heroically.

=== Detective White Pigeon ===
Detective White Pigeon is a heroic and combat-savvy investigator who is a subordinate of Sheriff Black Cat. On a thunderstorm night, huge monsters attacked the forest residents, and many small animals were taken away.After Sheriff Black Cat learned that the monster was disguised as a monkey-eating hawk, he immediately sent Detective White Pigeon to investigate the nest of the monkey-eating hawk. Detective White Pigeon was unfortunately discovered when he reported to Sheriff Black Cat at the destination and was beaten by the monkey-eating hawk. He was seriously injured and fell into a coma. He was finally rescued by Sheriff Black Cat and others who came to support him.

=== Monkey-Eating Eagle ===
Its name could also be Philippine Eagle. Not much is known about this avian, other than it kidnaps small children of other animals and presumes to eat them.

=== One ear ===
One ear is the villain, a mouse, his uncle is a cat-eating mouse, and his eldest brother is a monkey-eating eagle and Dr. Great Ape.

=== Cat-Eating Mouse ===
Cat-Eating Mouse is a one-eared uncle who comes from Africa and is so powerful that he can pick up a huge cat's paw with one hand and beat away crocodiles with an oar. There were three of them in the play, and they once led everyone to attack the police station and killed the white cat squad leader. In the end, except for one Er Sanjiu who was shot dead, the rest were captured by Black Cat Sheriff.

=== Mantis young man ===
Mantis young man fell in love with Mantis girl at first sight while fighting against the locust plague, and got married. On their wedding night, to raise stronger offspring, he was voluntarily eaten by Mantis girl, and left a suicide note to prove that Mantis girl was innocent.

=== Mantis girl ===
The mantis girl fell in love with the mantis young man at first sight while fighting against the locust plague, and they got married. On their wedding night, they ate the groom to raise stronger offspring.

== Zhu Zhixiang's original Comic (manhua) (February 1982–1991) ==
The comic (manhwa) was published by Fujian Children's Publishing House which was first featured in the Chinese science fiction anthology Science Fiction World which ran from February 1982 to 1991.

== 1984–1987 original series ==
The original version of Black Cat Detective aired from 1984 to 1987 on CCTV in China and NHK in Japan, lasting 5 episodes on the first season (and also an unmade 6th episode).

The protagonists in the 1980s have some limitations due to the influence of the times, and are somewhat "tall, big and complete". At that time, the police officers in life were dressed in a somewhat "unfashionable" style, with a gun on their waist, a motorcycle, white clothes, and blue trousers. Basically, after taking off the hat and getting the collar badge, he looks almost like a chef. It's not that powerful anyway. The black uniform of Sheriff Black Cat is very similar to that of the police today, and he also wears such high riding boots, which makes him look very time-traveled.

=== Controversy ===
Critics bemoaned the series for its depiction of gore and weapons (such as guns, knives and swords) including rude dirty words in Chinese and it did not have the same "harmless" type of cartoon violence like in Tom and Jerry. The most infamous scene from the series is when at the end of episode 1 where One-Eared Mouse got his name after his ear was shot off, complete with blood all over his head and hand.

=== 2006 rerun ===
Not much is known about the reruns that aired in 2006.

== 2010 digitally restored film ==
The digitally restored animated film was released on April 23, 2010, with the general director still Dai Tielang (戴铁郎). The new movie version is actually a cut from the original 5 episodes of the show, with dialogue rewritten and dubbed for the times, and the movie theme song sung by Lin Miao Ke (林妙可).

== 2015 animated film ==
Mr. Black: Green Star has been released in theaters on August 7, 2015.
