= The Proud General =

- Directed by: Te Wei
- Written by: Hua Junwu
- Production company: Shanghai Animation Film Studio
- Release date: 1956
- Running time: 24 minutes
- Country: China
- Language: Mandarin

The Proud General (simplified Chinese: 骄傲的将军; traditional Chinese: 驕傲的將軍; pinyin: Jiāo'ào de Jiāngjūn) is a Chinese animated featurette produced by Shanghai Animation Film Studio under the animator Te Wei. It is also translated as The Conceited General.

== Plot ==
After a victorious military campaign, a general returns home to glory and prosperity. The king rewards him and claims that all enemies will be intimidated by the general. From then on, the general no longer practices martial arts. He eats, drinks, lives the glamorous life, and doesn't bother anymore with sharpening his weapons. When the enemy one day returns, his own arrogance leads to his defeat and eventually to the downfall of the whole nation.

== Creators ==
English Production	Original Version	Romanized	Original Credit
Screenwriter	編劇	Hua Junwu	华君武
Director	导演	Te Wei	特伟
Chief Designer	总設計	Jiajun Quan	钱家骏
Composer	作曲	Chen Gexin	陈歌辛
Assistant Director	副導演	Li Kuero	李克弱
Background Design	背景設計	Liu Fengzhan	劉鳳展
Animation Design	动画設計	Du Chunxi; Tang Cheng; Pu Jiaxiang; Duan Yi; Lu Qing; Hu Jinqing; Yan Dingxian; Dai Tielang; Lin Wenxiao	杜春甫 唐澄 浦家祥 段浚 陆青 胡进庆 严定宪 戴铁郎 林文肖
Performance Director	奏演指导	Chen Furui	陈富瑞
Photography	攝影	Chen Zhenxiang; Ge Fangxiong	陈震祥 葛方雄
Painting	绘景	Gao Yang; Jiang Aijian; Fang Pengjian; Xu Jingda	高陽 江爱坚 方澎年 徐景達
Editing	剪辑	Lee Kai-ki	李开基
Recording	錄音	Zhou Yunlin	周雲林
Special Skill	特技	Lu Jingtang	吕敬棠
Played by	演奏	The Upper Film Orchestra	上影乐团
Conductor	指挥	Chen Gixin	陳歌辛

== Production ==
The film was heavily influenced by Disney from the perspective of character design, movement and storytelling point of view. The music is derived from the Beijing Opera. The clothing, architecture, and props do have a strong sense of Chinese cultural influence.

== DVD ==
The film has been re-released as part of the Chinese Classic Animation Te Wei Collection set. The Conceited General does have English subtitles.
