= The Forbidden City (1918 film) =

1918 film by Sidney Franklin

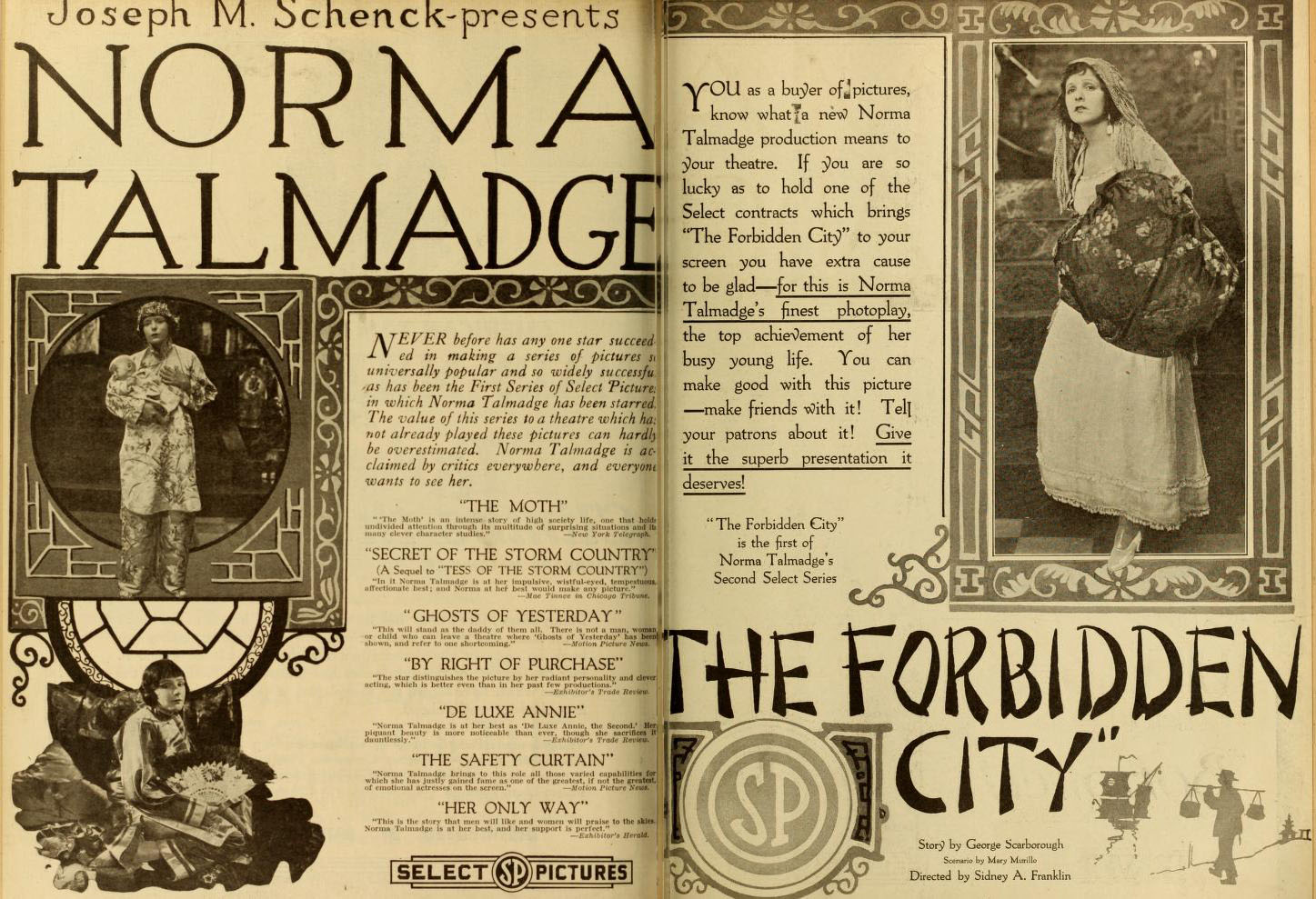
- Advertisement in Moving Picture World, September 1918
- Directed by: Sidney Franklin
- Written by: Mary Murillo
- Story by: George Scarborough
- Produced by: Joseph M. Schenck
- Starring: Norma Talmadge; Thomas Meighan
- Cinematography: H. Lyman Broening; Edward Wynard
- Production company: Selznick Pictures
- Distributed by: Select Pictures Corporation
- Release date: October 6, 1918
- Running time: 62 minutes
- Country: United States
- Language: Silent (English intertitles)

The Forbidden City

The Forbidden City is a 1918 American silent drama film starring Norma Talmadge and Thomas Meighan and directed by Sidney Franklin. A copy of the film is in the Library of Congress and other film archives.

== Plot ==
The plot centers around an inter-racial romance between a Chinese princess (Talmadge) and an American (Meighan). When palace officials discover she has become pregnant, she is sentenced to death. In the latter part of the film Talmadge plays the now adult daughter of the affair, seeking her father in the Philippines.

== Cast (in credits order) ==
- Norma Talmadge as San San / Toy
- Thomas Meighan as John Worden
- E. Alyn Warren as Wong Li
- Michael Rayle as Mandarin
- L. Rogers Lytton as Chinese Emperor
- Reid Hamilton as Lieutenant Philip Halbert
- Charles Fang as Yuan-Loo
