= Imfura =

2017 Rwandan short film

- Directed by: Samuel Ishimwe
- Written by: Samuel Ishimwe
- Produced by: Haute École d'Art et de Design (HEAD); Imitana Productions
- Starring: Moses Mwizerwa; Kijyana Yves; Nyirababikira Hadidja
- Cinematography: Samuel Ishimwe
- Edited by: Samuel Ishimwe
- Music by: Eugène Safali
- Release date: 13 December 2017 (Rwanda)
- Running time: 36 min.
- Countries: Rwanda; Switzerland
- Language: Kinyarwanda

Imfura, is a 2017 Rwandan documentary short film directed by Samuel Ishimwe and co-produced by Daniel Schweizer and Jean Perret for Haute École d'Art et de Design (HEAD) and Imitana Productions. The film stars Moses Mwizerwa in lead role along with Kijyana Yves and Nyirababikira Hadidja in supportive roles.

The film received positive reviews and won several awards in international film festivals. It became the first Rwandan production to be included in the competition of Berlinale Shorts. The short won the Silver Bear Jury Price at Berlin International Film Festival.

== Plot ==
The film deals with a story set in a post-genocide Rwanda.

== Cast ==
- Moses Mwizerwa as Gisa
- Kijyana Yves as Gahigi
- Nyirababikira Hadidja as Seraphina
