= Samuel Ishimwe =

Rwandan filmmaker

- Born: Samuel Ishimwe Karemangingo; Kigali, Rwanda
- Occupations: Director, cinematographer, editor, sound engineer, screenwriter, producer
- Years active: 2011–present

Samuel Ishimwe Karemangingo (born 1991), is a Rwandan filmmaker. He is best known as the director of critically acclaim short film Imfura, where he became the first Rwandan filmmaker represented at Berlinale. Apart from being a director, he is also a cinematographer, editor, sound engineer, screenwriter and producer.

== Personal life ==
He was born in 1991 in Kigali, Rwanda. His mother left him when he was a baby and he lost his parents and family member during the Rwandan genocide.

== Career ==
After completing secondary studies in 2010, Ishimwe started working as a reporter and Photographer at the 'igihe.com'. In 2011, he made the maiden short film Paying debts which was screened in the Rwanda Film Festival. In the same year, he participated in a documentary workshop in Uganda conducted by Maisha Film Lab. While in Uganda, he worked as an assistant producer on short documentary Invisible souls. Later in 2011, he participated in a documentary film directing workshop called 'K-dox' conducted by James Longley. In June 2012, Ishimwe finished a 3 months intensive course on filmmaking at Kwetu Film Institute. Then in September 2012, he participated in writing and directing program called 'A Sample of Work'.

He wrote the script of Crossing Lines and won an award in a local scriptwriting competition organised by Goethe Institute Rwanda. Later he worked as a journalist and photographer after graduating from National University of Rwanda. He then went to Switzerland for further studies. In June 2017, Ishimwe obtained a film degree at the Haute école d’art et de design (Geneva School of Art and Design–HEAD).

In 2017, he made the short film Imfura, which means 'First Born'. The film deals with a story set in a post-genocide Rwanda. It is the first Rwandan production to be included in the competition of Berlinale Shorts. The short film won the Silver Bear Jury Price at Berlin International Film Festival.

== Filmography ==
Year	Film	Role	Genre	Ref.
2011	Paying debts	director	Short film	
2011	Invisible souls	assistant producer	Short film	
2014	Crossing Lines	director	Short film	
2014	Uruzi	director	Short film	
2016	The Liberators	cinematographer	Short film	
2016	Versus	cinematographer	Short film	
2017	Imfura	director, screenplay, cinematographer, editor, sound designer	Short film	
2018	I got my Things and Left	cinematographer, producer	Short film	
2020	Fish Bowl	producer, cinematographer	Short film	
