= The Cowboy's Flute =

- Directed by: Te Wei; Qian Jiajun
- Written by: Te Wei
- Release date: 1963
- Running time: 20 minutes
- Country: China
- Language: none

The Cowboy's Flute (Chinese: 牧笛, Mù Dí) is a Chinese animated short film produced by Shanghai Animation Film Studio under the master animator Te Wei. It is also referred to as The Cowherd's Flute and The Buffalo Boy and his Flute.

== Background ==
The film does not contain any dialogue. The animation is essentially Chinese painting in motion, with a heavy emphasis on the flute melody.

== Plot ==
The story is about a young cow herding boy with an extraordinary flute playing ability, who is accompanied by his faithful water buffalo. The boy falls asleep in a tree, and is soon dreaming that he has lost his buffalo. The dream sequence is delightfully whimsical, beginning with falling leaves that turn into butterflies and gradually lead the cow herder to a beautiful mist-filled valley. Here the buffalo refuses to budge from his hiding spot, leaving the cow herder to find an alternate musical solution to his problem.

== Home media ==
The Cowboy's Flute has been released on DVD as part of the Chinese Classic Animation Te Wei Collection set. It is available for streaming on iQIYI.

== Accolades ==
More than a decade after its completion, the film would win an award at the Odense International Film Festival in 1979.
