= Shanghai Animation Film Studio =

Chinese animation studio

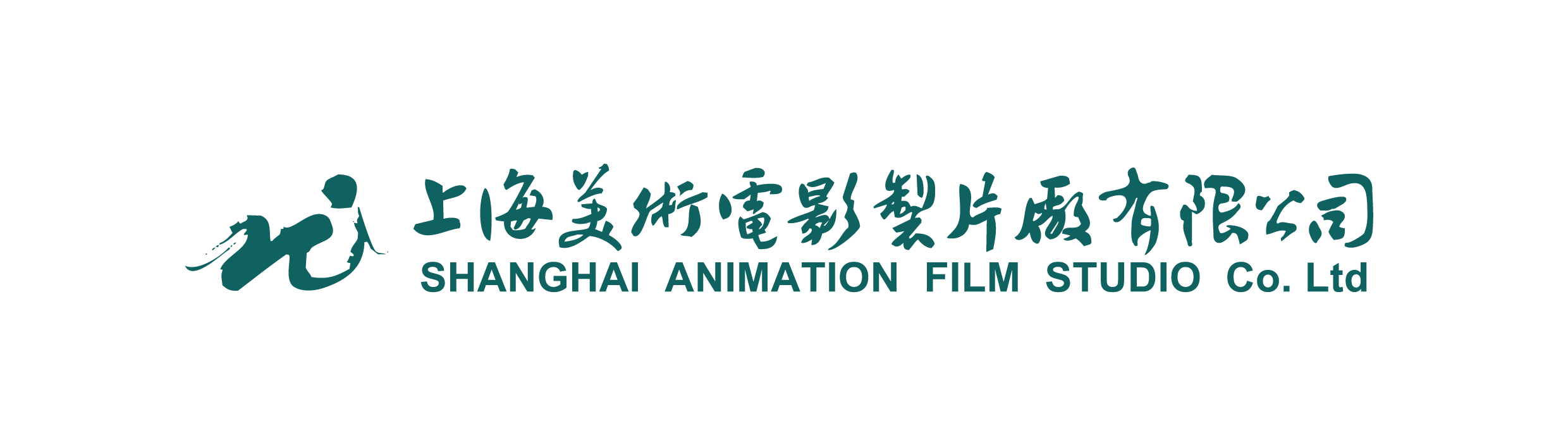
- Type: State-owned enterprise
- Industry: Entertainment
- Predecessor: Animation Department
- Founded: Shanghai, Republic of China (January 1946)
- Headquarters: Shanghai, China
- Key people: Wan brothers, Te Wei; Yu Zheguang
- Products: Animated and puppet films and television shows
- Parent: Shanghai Film Group (2001 - present)
- Website: www.ani-sh.com

Shanghai Animation Film Studio (simplified Chinese: 上海美术电影制片厂; traditional Chinese: 上海美術電影製片廠; pinyin: Shànghǎi Měishù Diànyǐng Zhìpiānchǎng; Wugniu: zaon-he me-zeq di-in tsy-phi-tshaon), also known as SAFS (simplified Chinese: 美影厂; traditional Chinese: 美影廠; pinyin: Měi Yǐng Chǎng; Wugniu: me-in-tshaon), is a Chinese animation studio based in Shanghai, China, as part of the Shanghai Film Group Corporation. Shanghai Animation Film Studio was officially established in April 1957, led by pioneering animators and artists, including Te Wei, and the Wan Brothers. It has produced around 500 films with over 40,000 minutes of original animation data source, covering 80% of China's domestic animation production.

SAFS produces a number of animated films in various art forms with Chinese artistic characteristics, including Jianzhi, Shuimohua, Puppetoon, Zhezhi (also known as origami), Shadow puppetry, etc. It also has international collaborations with various studios around the world.

== History ==
=== Establishment (1946-1957) ===
In 1949, at the time the People's of Republic China was established, the Ministry of Culture sent a group of young animators, including Te Wei (1915-2010), the caricaturist, and Jing Shi (1919-1997), the painter, to Changchun Film Studio, known as Northeast Film Studio before 1946, to start an animation team. As Te Wei described, the pioneers had a lack of knowledge and technique regarding animation, so at the time, Te Wei led the team to study animation productions done by the Soviet Union.

In 1950, the animation team transferred to Shanghai, where advanced animating equipment and human resources were available, and it was expanded by the entry of new young artists from Central Academy of Fine Arts, the Art Institute of Suzhou, and other leading institutions. Meanwhile, as the political situation stabilized in China, the Wan Brothers, Wan Chaochen and Wan Laiming, the earliest Chinese animators, returned to Shanghai to join the group. In 1957, Shanghai Animation Film Studio was officially set up as an independent department under the Ministry of Culture. As the director and the head of the studio, Te Wei led over 200 workers at the time to create educational and entertaining animated films for children. While learning animation techniques from overseas, the pioneers started to explore new methods to reflect Chinese cultural characteristics, including using puppets, paper-cutting, and traditional Chinese art elements such as Beijing Opera masking. The Magical Pen (1955) and The Conceited General (1956), two of the most representative films at the time, brought up attention worldwide and won a series of domestic and international awards.

The founding of Shanghai Animation Film studio was also promoted by the "Hundred Flowers Campaign" in 1956, in which the government of the Communist Party encouraged the development and innovation of technology and art in China.

=== The golden age (1957–1966) ===
After the success of The Magical Pen (1955) and The Conceited General (1956), the studio received additional support from the government, which encouraged them to study Western animation and develop its own models and methods that were truly Chinese. The period of 1957 to 1966 was described as the "golden age" of Chinese animation films, especially because of the high productivity and quality of Shanghai Animation Film Studio. Along with the creative techniques and outstanding Chinese artistry, a number of animated films have reached the top level internationally.

Premier Zhou Enlai said that, "Animation films are rather outstanding with their special and unique style in the Chinese Film Industry." In this period, the studio developed various innovative techniques expressing national style. In 1958, Wan Guchan, with young animator Hu Jinqing, and their crew developed a new animating technique, jianzhi, based on Chinese traditional paper-cuts and produced the first jianzhi style animation, Pigsy Eats Watermelon (1958). Te Wei, inspired by the famous ink wash artist Qi Baishi, directed the first ink-wash and brush-painting style animated film - Little Tadpoles Looking for Mama (1960), which won high valued awards at movie festivals, including the Locarno International Film Festival in 1961, the 4th Annecy International Animation Film Festival in 1962, and the 17th Cannes Film Festival in 1964. In 1963, Te Wei and Qian Jiajun produced the second ink-wash and brush-painting animation, Buffalo Boy and the Flute (1963). In the same period, Yu Zhenguang (1906-1991) directed the first folded-paper animation, A Clever Duckling (1963), featuring a folk craft technique called zhezhi (also known as Japanese origami).

The most well-known animation produced at Shanghai Animation Film Studio is Havoc in Heaven (Da Nao Tian Gong) (1961,1964), directed by Wan Laiming as his second cel animation. He adopted many features from Chinese stage art for environmental design, character design, movement reference (especially in Peking opera's military style), and the beautiful rich color palette. The movie was shown at the Locarno Film Festival in 1965 and won wide praise from international audiences.

In this period, Shanghai Animation Film studio produced various animated films of differing lengths, including The Adventures of The Little Fisherman (1959), The Spirit of Ginseng (1961), Red Army Bridge (1964) and More or Less (1964) among others. These films brought Chinese animation to the world stage at that time.

When Peking Television was launched on September 2, 1958, the Shanghai Animation Film Studio began producing animated TV commercials for various clients including Tsingtao Brewery, but the station stopped airing TVCs during the Cultural Revolution from 1966 to 1976. However, it wasn't until 1979, when the Shanghai Animation Film Studio resumed the production of animated TV commercials since the reform and opening up held by Deng Xiaoping from 1978 to 2013, including Coca-Cola (an American soft drink from Atlanta, Georgia, which was unofficially sold in communist Mainland China from 1949 to 1979 before it became official).

The golden age ended with the outbreak of the Cultural Revolution in 1966, which dealt the animation film industry a hard blow, and limited the productivity of the studio.

=== Cultural Revolution (1966–1976) ===
During the period of the Cultural Revolution, the whole studio was shut down by the Red Guards from 1965 to 1972. Almost all the animated films produced before were prohibited, except The Cock Crows at Midnight (1964) by Yiou Lei, a puppet film about overthrowing evil landlords, and Two Heroic Sisters of the Grasslands (1964), directed by Qian Yunda and Tang Cheng, singing the praises of Mao Zedong and the Chinese Communist Party:

"There are countless stars in the sky. But greater by far is the number of the commune's sheep. In the sky are pure white clouds. But whiter yet is the wool of the commune's sheep. Whiter yet is the wool of the commune's sheep. Our beloved Chairman Mao Dear Chairman Mao, under your sun the prairie prospers. Our beloved Communist Party, Dear Communist Party. The little shepherdesses grow under your leadership. The little shepherdesses grow under your leadership…" [Two Heroic Sisters of the Grasslands (1964)]

Famous movies such as Buffalo Boy and the Flute (1963) and Havoc in Heaven (1961, 1964) were banned because of the "ignorance of class struggle" and the implication of overthrowing the government. Many of the leaders and artists of the previous productions of the studio were rounded up and sent to peasant villages to self-reflect on their anti-revolutionary actions. In 1973, animators were gradually sent back to the studio, but most animations during this era were made for propaganda use in order to educate illiterate groups of the masses about contemporary political affairs, including Support Vietnamese to Fight Against America, Expose the Peace Negotiation Conspiracy of America, and After School. In the same year, Wang Shuchen and Yan Dingxian made The Little Balu (1973), a story of a boy who joined the liberation Red Army. The bold graphic style of characters and background corresponded to the style of prevailing propaganda posters around the country at the time.

Not until the fall of the Gang of Four in 1976, did the studio finally recover under the stabilized political situation. Returning animators started to work on the projects that they had left behind for years.

=== Late 20th century (1976-1999) ===
In 1979, Nezha Conquers the Dragon King was made to celebrate the 30th anniversary of the founding of the People's Republic of China. It was the first full-length animation film in China.

The first puppet series, The Story of Afanti, was published in 1980 and vividly depicts Afanti, a legendary figure of the Xinjiang Uygur ethnic group.

In 1981, Three Monks, based on a Chinese folk proverb, was published by The Shanghai Fine Arts Film Studio and won the first Golden Rooster Award for Chinese film in 1980.

In 1984, Shanghai Animation Film Studio adjusted the leadership, with Yan Dingxian as director and Te Wei as a consultant. The focus of this period was on a series of fine art films. For example, the first paper-cut series Calabash Brothers (which became a pop culture phenomenon) the 13-episode animated series The Dirty King's Adventures, the animated series Shuke and Beta, and The Rubik's Cube Tower were also important works of this period. Subsequently, Zhou Keqin and Chang Guangxi successively held the post of factory director. Another well known series, Black Cat Detective was started in the same year, being an adaptation of the manhua with the same name by Zhu Zhixiang.

Since 1985, Chinese animation films have experienced a difficult period, when anime from Japan and the United States quickly took over the domestic market.

In 1992, one of the first Western companies to come in contact with the studio was Prrfect Animation in San Francisco, United States. They attempted to bring efficiency, dependability, and quality control to the studio. In 2001, the studio became part of the Shanghai Film Group Corporation.

In 1994, Jin Guoping became the factory director. Lotus Lantern (1999) was another theatrical animated film after the Golden Monkey King (1984), and it was the first commercial animated film in China. It was made by Chang Guangxi as director, Wu Yigong as artistic director, and Jin Fuzai as music director. Jiang Wen, Jing Ning, Chen Paisi, Xu Fan, and others participated in the dubbing. The three theme songs and interludes were "365 Days to Think of you", "Heaven and Earth in my Heart", and "Love in one Word". The singers were Coco Lee, Liu Huan, and Zhang Xinzhe.

=== 21st century (2000-Present) ===
In 2001, Music Up, the first animated series of campus music, opened a new chapter for domestic animation with its flying and unrestrained dream chasing stories and many original songs elaborately created. With the new strength of Hu Yanbin, Inspiration Band, and other bands, it set a record of super platinum album sales.

In 2004, the first installment of Big Ear Tutu animation series, directed by Su Da, was released and premiered on CCTV children's channel. Over the course of five seasons, the 130-episode series has been a childhood companion for countless children. For many years in a row, it has been the champion of The Children's Channel of CCTV and the four big cartoon TV stations in terms of audience rating, with over 2 billion online voD.

In 2006, Shanghai Animation Films Studio produced the cinema puppet film "Xi Yu Qi Tong".

In 2007, the shadow produced a large national epic cinema cartoon "Warriors", and won the "12th China Hua Biao Award Outstanding Animated Film", "Changzhou Best Feature Film Award", and also won the "Golden Rooster Award for Best Animated Film" and "Golden Bear Award" International - the best cinema cartoon animation works.

In 2011, more than 50 years after Havoc in Heaven was released, the studio combined tradition with high technology and teamed up with the world's largest film and television post-production company to create a new 3D version of the classic work.

In March 2013, the studio sued Apple Inc. for selling over 110 of their films on iTunes without authorization.

In April 2018, Su Da became the director of Shanghai Animation Film Studio.

In 2024, the studio released "Yao - A Chinese Story", an animated anthology that gained both critical praise and wide popularity. The first episode of the series was later adapted into a 2025 film, Nobody. Loosely based on the stories of The Journey to the West, the film broke the record to become the highest grossing 2D animated feature film in China.

In 2026, the former site of the studio in Jing'an district became the Shanghai Animation Space, a museum of animation cinema.

== Key people ==
- Wan brothers (Wan Laiming, 1900-1997, Wan Guchen, 1900-1995, Wan Chaochen, 1906-1992, Wan Dihuan, 1907 - ?), the founders and pioneers of the Chinese animation industry. Made the first Asian animation feature-length film, Princess with the Iron Fan (1939).
- Te Wei (1915–2010), caricaturist, animator, director, the first head of Shanghai Animation Film Studio.
- Jing Shi (1919-1997), painter, animator.
- Qian Jiajun (1916–2011), animator, director, one of the founders of ink-wash animation.
- Qian Yunda (born 1928), animator, director. character designer.
- Jin Jin (1915-1989), children's writer.
- Yan Dingxian (1936-?), animation director and head of Shanghai Studio from 1985-1989
- A Da (Xu Jingda), animator, cartoonist, film producer

== Selected films and TV series ==
- 1950 Thank you, Kitty (Xie Xie Xiao Hua Mao)
- 1951 Xiao Tiezhu
- 1952 Kitten goes fishing
- 1953 Mushroom
- 1955 The Magic Paint-brush
- 1956 The Proud General
- 1958 Pigsy Eats Watermelon (Zhubajie Chi Xi Gua)
- 1960 Little Tadpoles Looking for Mama
- 1961, 1964 Havoc in Heaven
- 1963 Buffalo Boy and the Flute
- 1963 A Clever Duckling
- 1964 Red Army Bridge
- 1964 The Cock Crows at Midnight
- 1964 Two Heroic Sisters of the Grasslands
- 1973 The little Balu
- 1979 Prince Nezha's Triumph Against Dragon King
- 1981 Monkeys Fish the Moon
- 1981 A Deer of Nine Colors
- 1983 The Fight Between the Snipe and the Clam
- 1984 Black Cat Detective
- 1985 The Monkey King Conquers the Demon (San Da Baigujing)
- 1989 Shuke and Beita
- 1999 Lotus Lantern
- 2001 Music Up
- 2005 Kitten Dream
- 2025 Nobody (2025 film)

== International collaborations ==
- 1989 Reynard The Fox with Manfred Durniok Filmproduktion (Germany), and Zweites Deutsches Fernsehen (Germany)
- 1993 Baby Follies with Les Cartooneurs Associés and Canal+ (France)
- 1998 Around the World in Eighty Days with Manfred Durniok Film (Germany)
- 1997 The Toothbrush Family with Southern Star Entertainment (Australia), and Film Australia (Australia)
- 2000 A Miss Mallard Mystery with Cookie Jar Entertainment (Canada)
- 2002 Space Hip Hop Duck with Sunwoo Entertainment (South Korea), and Korean Broadcasting System (South Korea)
- 2002 Simon in the Land of Chalk Drawings with Cookie Jar Entertainment (Canada)
- 2009 Fishtronaut with TV PinGuim (Brazil), and Tooncan (Canada)
- 2014 Earth to Luna! with TV PinGuim (Brazil)

== See also ==
- History of Chinese Animation
- Chinese Animation
- Changchun Film Studio
- Northeast Film Studio
- Shanghai Film Group Corporation
