= Lists of animated films =

These lists of animated feature films compile animated feature films from around the world and are organized alphabetically under the year of release (the year the completed film was first released to the public). Theatrical releases as well as made-for-TV (TV) and direct-to-video (V) movies of all types of animation are included. Currently, the lists don't recognize one release form from another.

In order to qualify for these lists, films must be "over 40 minutes long and have animation in at least 75% of their running time, or have at least 40 minutes of animation in total". These lists use the American Film Institute, Academy of Motion Picture Arts and Sciences and British Film Institute definitions of a feature film. For animated films under 40 minutes, see List of animated short films. For marionette films like Team America: World Police, or films featuring non-animated puppets, see Puppet films. Primarily live-action films with heavy use of special effects are also included.

== By major film studios ==
- The Walt Disney Company
  - List of Disney theatrical animated feature films
  - List of Disney feature-length home entertainment releases
  - List of Walt Disney Animation Studios films (Unproduced) (Shorts)
  - List of Disney Television Animation productions
  - List of Disneytoon Studios productions
  - List of Disney live-action remakes and adaptations feature films
  - List of Disney Channel original films
  - List of Pixar films (Shorts) (SparkShorts)
  - List of Pixar Animation Television productions
  - List of 20th Century Studios theatrical animated feature films (Unproduced)
  - List of 20th Century Animation films
  - List of Fox Animation Studios films
  - List of 20th Television Animation productions
  - List of Blue Sky Studios productions
  - List of films based on Marvel Comics publications
  - List of television series based on Marvel Comics publications
  - List of Marvel Animation productions
  - List of Marvel Studios Animation productions
  - List of Marvel Productions productions
  - List of Lucasfilm Animation productions
- Skydance Corporation
  - List of Paramount Pictures theatrical animated feature films (Unproduced)
  - List of Paramount Animation productions
  - List of Skydance Animation productions
  - List of Nickelodeon Animation Studio productions (Shorts)
  - List of Nickelodeon Movies productions
  - List of Nickelodeon original films
  - List of Terrytoons animated shorts
  - List of Transformers animated series
  - List of Warner Bros. theatrical animated feature films (Unproduced)
  - List of Warner Bros. Pictures Animation productions
  - List of Warner Bros. Cartoons productions
  - List of Warner Bros. Animation productions
  - List of Cartoon Network Studios productions
  - List of Cartoon Network films
  - Hanna-Barbera Studios Europe
  - Williams Street
  - List of works produced by Hanna-Barbera Productions
  - List of films based on Hanna-Barbera cartoons
  - List of Ruby-Spears productions
  - List of films based on DC Comics publications
  - List of television series based on DC Comics publications
  - List of The Flintstones media
  - List of Scooby-Doo media
    - List of Scooby-Doo feature films
  - Looney Tunes and Merrie Melodies filmography
    - List of Looney Tunes feature films
  - Tom and Jerry filmography
    - List of Tom and Jerry feature films
  - List of Rooster Teeth productions
- NBCUniversal
  - List of Universal Pictures theatrical animated feature films (Unproduced)
  - List of Universal Animation Studios productions
  - List of DreamWorks productions (Unproduced)
  - List of DreamWorks Animation Television productions
  - List of Illumination productions
  - List of VeggieTales videos
  - Felix the Cat filmography
  - List of works produced by Filmation
- Sony Pictures
  - List of Sony theatrical animated feature films (Unproduced)
  - List of Sony Pictures Animation productions
  - List of Adelaide Productions
  - List of Sony Pictures Television Kids films
  - List of UPA cartoons

== By other studios ==
- Amazon MGM Studios
  - List of Metro-Goldwyn-Mayer theatrical animated feature films
  - List of Metro-Goldwyn-Mayer Animation productions
  - List of Metro-Goldwyn-Mayer cartoon studio films
  - List of one-shot Metro-Goldwyn-Mayer animated shorts
  - List of MGM Animation/Visual Arts films
- Lionsgate Studios
  - List of Lionsgate theatrical animated feature films
- The Weinstein Company
  - List of The Weinstein Company animated films
- List of The Jim Henson Company films
- List of The Muppets productions
- List of Sesame Workshop productions
- Hasbro
  - List of films based on Hasbro properties
  - List of television programs based on Hasbro properties
- Mattel
  - List of Mattel productions
- Kirkbi
  - List of Lego animated films and series
- Frederator Studios
  - Frederator cartoon shorts filmography
- Netflix
  - List of Netflix animated films and series
- Laika, LLC
  - List of Laika animated films
- Angel Studios
  - List of Angel Studios animated films and series
- Cartoon Saloon
  - List of Cartoon Saloon animated films and series
- Aardman Animations
  - List of Aardman animated films and series
- Studio Ghibli
  - List of Studio Ghibli works
  - Short films by Studio Ghibli
- Don Bluth Entertainment
  - List of Don Bluth Entertainment animated films
- Crest Animation Productions
  - List of Crest Animation Productions animated films
- Vanguard Animation
  - List of Vanguard Animation films

== By year ==
- Before 1940
- 1940s
- 1950s
- 1960s
- 1970s
- 1970
- 1971
- 1972
- 1973
- 1974
- 1975
- 1976
- 1977
- 1978
- 1979
- 1980s
- 1980
- 1981
- 1982
- 1983
- 1984
- 1985
- 1986
- 1987
- 1988
- 1989
- 1990s
- 1990
- 1991
- 1992
- 1993
- 1994
- 1995
- 1996
- 1997
- 1998
- 1999
- 2000s
- 2000
- 2001
- 2002
- 2003
- 2004
- 2005
- 2006
- 2007
- 2008
- 2009
- 2010s
- 2010
- 2011
- 2012
- 2013
- 2014
- 2015
- 2016
- 2017
- 2018
- 2019
- 2020s
- 2020
- 2021
- 2022
- 2023
- 2024
- 2025
- 2026
- 2027
- 2028
- 2029

== By country ==
- Albanian
- American
- Argentine
- Australian
- Belgian
- Brazilian
- British
- Canadian
- Chilean
- Chinese
- Croatian
- Czech
- Danish
- Dutch
- Estonian
- French
- German
- Hungarian
- Indian
- Irish
- Italian
- Japanese
- Korean
- Malaysian
- Mexican
- Norwegian
- Pakistani
- Philippines
- Polish
- Panama
- Russian
- Singaporean
- South African
- Spanish
- Swedish
- Turkish
- Ukrainian
- Vietnamese

== By technique ==
- Combined animation and live-action
- Computer-animated
- Flash-animated
- Stop-motion
- Puppet films

== By length ==
- List of animated short films
- List of theatrical animated short film series
- List of longest animated films

== By award ==
- Academy Award for Best Animated Feature (Nominated) (Submissions)
- Academy Award for Best Animated Short Film (Submissions)
- Annie Award for Best Animated Feature
- Annie Award for Best Animated Feature – Independent
- Asia Pacific Screen Award for Best Animated Feature Film
- BAFTA Award for Best Animated Film
- César Award for Best Animated Film
- European Film Award for Best Animated Feature Film
- Golden Globe Award for Best Animated Feature Film
- Golden Rooster Award for Best Animation
- Goya Award for Best Animated Film
- Hundred Flowers Award for Best Animation
- Japan Academy Prize for Animation of the Year
- Mainichi Film Award for Best Animation Film
- Ōfuji Noburō Award
- Satellite Award for Best Animated or Mixed Media Feature
- Saturn Award for Best Animated Film

== Other ==
- Lists of animated television series
- List of animated package films
- List of live-action films based on cartoons and comics
- List of highest-grossing animated films
  - List of highest-grossing live-action/animated films
  - List of animated films by box office admissions
- List of animated films in the public domain in the United States
- List of adult animated feature films
- List of children's animated films
- List of lost or unfinished animated films
- Lists of anime
- List of animated Internet series
- List of adult animated web series
- List of animated direct-to-video series
- List of most expensive animated films
- List of DIC programs
- List of Nelvana programs
- List of WildBrain programs
- List of years in animation

== See also ==
- Best Animated Feature Film
- History of animation
- List of animation studios
- List of Japanese animation studios
- List of animation distribution companies
- List of anime companies
