= Hundred Flowers Awards =

Chinese film award

People's Hundred Flowers Award 大众电影百花奖
- The Hundred Flowers Award
- Awarded for: Best in film
- Country: China
- Presented by: China Film Association
- First award: 1962; 64 years ago

Hundred Flowers Award
- Traditional Chinese: 大眾電影百花獎
- Simplified Chinese: 大众电影百花奖
Transcriptions
Standard Mandarin
- Hanyu Pinyin: Dàzhòng Diànyǐng Bǎihuā Jiǎng
Yue: Cantonese
- Yale Romanization: Daaihjung Dihnyíng Baakfa Jéung
- Jyutping: Daai^{6}zung^{3} Din^{6}jing^{2} Baak^{3}fa^{1} Zoeng^{2}

The Hundred Flowers Awards (Chinese: 大众电影百花奖; pinyin: Dàzhòng Diànyǐng Bǎihuā Jiǎng) are, together with the Golden Rooster Awards, the most prestigious film awards honouring the best in Chinese cinema, as well as Hong Kong cinema and the Cinema of Taiwan. They are classified as the Chinese equivalent of the United States' Golden Globes.

The awards were inaugurated by China Film Association in 1962 and sponsored by Popular Cinema (大众电影) magazine, which has the largest circulation in mainland China.

The awards were formerly voted by the readers of Popular Cinema annually. Recent polls allow voters to cast ballots through SMS, the Internet, or by phone call. Voting is now no longer confined to readers of Popular Cinema. Award recipients receive a statuette in the shape of a goddess of Flowers (花神).

== History ==
The 2nd Hundred Flowers Awards poll was held in 1963, but the poll was not conducted again until 1980 due to the Cultural Revolution. It became an annual event from 1980 until 2004. Since 2004, the Hundred Flowers Awards ceremonies have been held biennially on alternate years with the Golden Rooster.

In 1992, the Golden Rooster and the Hundred Flowers Awards were combined into a single national festival.

From 1980 to 2004, the annual Hundred Flowers poll selected three films with the most tallied votes as the Best Pictures of the year. Since 2006, films from the previous two years are considered eligible for awards, including Chinese-language films from Taiwan and Hong Kong. The film with the highest number of votes is chosen as Best Picture, with two runners-up.

== New Ballot Rules ==
China Film Association updated the ballot rules in 2006. The first ballot will result in a list of 8-10 pre-candidate films, whose domestic box-office earnings were greater than five million yuan, by the 100 cinema managers of China City Film Developing Association and members of China Film Association.

The second ballot will have the public selecting the five film nominations in each category by internet, mobile network, magazine votes, and SMS. Each nominee will receive a "Hundred Flowers Awards Nomination Certificate".

For the final ballot, a China official notary will randomly select 101 audience members who voted in the second round and hold dedicated screenings for all nominated pictures. The 101 audience members will then have a secret ballot and subsequently announce the winners.

== Other Categories ==
- Best Picture (最佳影片)
- Best Director (最佳导演)
- Best Writing (最佳编剧)
- Best Actor (最佳男主角)
- Best Actress (最佳女主角)
- Best Supporting Actor (最佳男配角)
- Best Supporting Actress (最佳女配角)
- Best Newcomer (最佳新人奖) - Since 2006

Irregular categories:

- Best Co-produce Film
- Best Chinese Opera Film
- Best Animation
- Best Documentary
- Best Cinematography
- Best Original Score
- Best Art Direction

== See also ==
- Huabiao Awards
