= List of Albanian animated films =

This is a list of animated films produced in Albania.

== Animated films by decade ==
- Animated films of the 1970s
- Animated films of the 1980s
- Animated films of the 1990s

== See also ==
- Albanian National Center of Cinematography
- Albanian Central Film Archive
- Cinema of Kosovo
