= 2020s in film =

The decade of the 2020s in film directly dealt with the impact of the COVID-19 pandemic on cinema. This witnessed a profound transformation in how movies are produced, distributed, and consumed globally. The pandemic led to widespread theater closures, delays in releases, and a rapid acceleration in the shift towards streaming services as a primary means of distribution.

== Highest-grossing films ==
† Indicates films playing in theatres in the week commencing 20 November 2026.

List of worldwide highest-grossing films
Rank	Title	Distributor(s)	Worldwide gross	Year	References
1	Spider-Man: Brand New Day †	Sony	$2,523,728,253	2026	
2	Avatar: The Way of Water	20th Century	$2,334,484,620	2022	
3	Ne Zha 2	Beijing Enlight	$2,270,700,370	2025	
4	Spider-Man: No Way Home	Sony	$1,922,598,800	2021	
5	Zootopia 2	Disney	$1,870,309,291	2025	
6	The Odyssey	Universal	$1,805,368,479	2026	
7	Inside Out 2	Disney	$1,698,863,816	2024	
8	Top Gun: Maverick	Paramount	$1,503,260,455	2022	
9	Avatar: Fire and Ash	20th Century	$1,490,386,712	2025	
10	Barbie	Warner Bros.	$1,447,138,421	2023	
11	The Super Mario Bros. Movie	Universal	$1,360,783,214	2023	
12	Deadpool & Wolverine	Disney	$1,338,073,645	2024	
13	Toy Story 5	Disney	$1,149,545,392	2026	
14	Moana 2	Disney	$1,059,242,164	2024	
15	Lilo & Stitch	Disney	$1,038,027,526	2025	
16	Michael	Lionsgate / Universal	$1,028,703,388	2026	
17	The Super Mario Galaxy Movie	Universal	$1,013,295,263	2026	
18	Jurassic World: Dominion	Universal	$1,004,004,592	2022	
19	Oppenheimer	Universal	$975,811,333	2023	
20	Despicable Me 4	Universal	$971,028,338	2024	
21	A Minecraft Movie	Warner Bros.	$961,187,780	2025	
22	Doctor Strange in the Multiverse of Madness	Disney	$955,775,805	2022	
23	Minions: The Rise of Gru	Universal	$939,628,210	2022	
24	The Battle at Lake Changjin	Huaxia	$902,540,935	2021	
25	Jurassic World Rebirth	Universal	$869,146,189	2025	
26	Black Panther: Wakanda Forever	Disney	$859,208,836	2022	
27	Guardians of the Galaxy Vol. 3	Disney	$845,555,777	2023	
28	Hi, Mom	Lian Ray	$841,674,419	2021	
29	Demon Slayer: Kimetsu no Yaiba - The Movie: Infinity Castle	Toho / Aniplex	$778,939,527	2025	
30	No Time to Die	MGM / Universal	$774,153,007	2021	
31	The Batman	Warner Bros.	$770,962,583	2022	
32	Thor: Love and Thunder	Disney	$760,928,081	2022	
33	Wicked	Universal	$756,401,043	2024	
34	F9	Universal	$726,229,501	2021	
35	Mufasa: The Lion King	Disney	$722,631,756	2024	
36	Dune: Part Two	Warner Bros.	$714,711,520	2024	
37	Fast X	Universal	$714,566,116	2023	
38	The Devil Wears Prada 2	20th Century	$693,492,689	2026	
39	Spider-Man: Across the Spider-Verse	Sony	$690,615,475	2023	
40	Detective Chinatown 3	Wanda Pictures	$686,257,563	2021	
41	Project Hail Mary	Amazon MGM / Sony	$685,052,245	2026	
42	Pegasus 3	Maoyan	$656,469,847	2026	
43	How to Train Your Dragon	Universal	$636,596,299	2025	
44	Full River Red	China Film Group	$634,631,282	2023	
45	Wonka	Warner Bros.	$632,302,312	2023	
46	F1: The Movie	Warner Bros. / Apple	$634,042,436	2025	
47	The Battle at Lake Changjin II	Huaxia	$626,571,697	2022	
48	Superman	Warner Bros.	$618,723,803	2025	
49	The Wandering Earth 2	China Film Group	$604,460,538	2023	
50	Mission: Impossible – The Final Reckoning	Paramount	$598,767,057	2025	

=== Highest-grossing film per year ===
The decade marked the first instances in cinema history when non-Hollywood productions topped the annual global box office.

Year	Title	Studio(s)	Worldwide Gross
2020	Demon Slayer: Kimetsu no Yaiba – The Movie: Mugen Train	Toho / Aniplex	$507,127,293
2021	Spider-Man: No Way Home	Sony	$1,912,233,593
2022	Avatar: The Way of Water	20th Century	$2,320,250,281
2023	Barbie	Warner Bros.	$1,445,638,421
2024	Inside Out 2	Disney	$1,698,863,816
2025	Ne Zha 2	Beijing Enlight Pictures	$2,270,700,370
2026	Spider-Man: Brand New Day †	Sony	$2,523,728,253

== Accolades ==
The following films received the most acclaim at the Academy Awards during the 2020s.

Year	Ceremony	Most nominations	Most awards	Best Picture
2020/21	93rd	Mank (10)	Nomadland (3)	Nomadland
2021	94th	The Power of the Dog (12)	Dune (6)	CODA
2022	95th	Everything Everywhere All at Once (11)	Everything Everywhere All at Once (7)	Everything Everywhere All at Once
2023	96th	Oppenheimer (13)	Oppenheimer (7)	Oppenheimer
2024	97th	Emilia Pérez (13)	Anora (5)	Anora
2025	98th	Sinners (16)	One Battle After Another (6)	One Battle After Another

== List of films ==
- 2020 in film
- 2021 in film
- 2022 in film
- 2023 in film
- 2024 in film
- 2025 in film
- 2026 in film
- 2027 in film
- 2028 in film

== See also ==
- Film, History of film, Lists of films
- List of animated feature films of the 2020s
