= Liu Sanjie (film) =

- Traditional Chinese: 劉三姐
- Simplified Chinese: 刘三姐
- Hanyu Pinyin: Liú Sānjiě
- Directed by: Su Li
- Written by: Qiao Yu
- Starring: Huang Wanqiu; Xia Zongxue; Zhang Juke
- Cinematography: Guo Zhenting; Yin Zhi
- Music by: Lei Zhenbang
- Production company: Changchun Film Studio
- Distributed by: Changchun Film Studio
- Release date: 1961
- Running time: 117 minutes
- Country: China
- Language: Mandarin

Liu Sanjie or Third Sister Liu is a 1961 Chinese musical film about the legendary folk singer Liu Sanjie, directed by Su Li (苏里). The film features many Zhuang traditional songs and extraordinary Guangxi landscapes. The film also uses elements from traditional Chinese operas.

The film was screened in more than 50 countries, and was considered by Premier Zhou Enlai as a film that made a great contribution to China's cultural exchanges with foreign countries. Outside mainland China, it was first screened in Hong Kong.

== Awards and nominations ==
- 1963 Hundred Flowers Awards
  - Winner - Best Cinematography (Yin Zhi, Guo Zhenting)
  - Winner - Best Original Score (Lei Zhenbang)
  - Winner - Best Art Direction (Tong Jingwen, Zhang Qiwang)
  - Nomination – Best Actress (Huang Wanqiu)
