= Hundred Flowers Award for Best Original Score =

Chinese film award

The Hundred Flowers Award for Best Original Score was first awarded by the China Film Association in 1962.

== 1980s ==
Year	Number	Director	Film
1980	3rd	Wang Ming 王酩	Little Flower\小花

== 1960s ==
Year	Number	Director	Film
1963	2nd	Lei Zhenbang 雷振邦	Third Sister Liu\刘三姐
1962	1st	Zhang Jingan 张敬安; Ouyang Qianshu 欧阳谦叔	Red Guards on Honghu Lake\洪湖赤卫队
