= Jiao Yesong =

Chinese animator and filmmaker

Jiao Yesong (1929-2020) was a Chinese animator and filmmaker.

He worked at Shanghai Animation Film Studio, being a pioneer of the ink-wash animation technique. Working on around 20 titles, he was the designer of Little Carp Jumping Over Dragons Gate (1958), Tadpoles Searching for Mother (1960) and The Cowboy's Flute (1963).
