= Hundred Flowers Award for Best Cinematography =

Chinese film award

The Hundred Flowers Award for Best Cinematography was first awarded by the China Film Association in 1962.

== 1980s ==
| Year | Number | Director | Film |
|---|---|---|---|
| 1980 | 3rd | Chen Guoliang 陈国梁; Yun Wenyao 云文耀 | Little Flower\小花 |

== 1960s ==
| Year | Number | Director | Film |
|---|---|---|---|
| 1963 | 2nd | Guo Zhenting 郭镇铤; Yin Zhi 尹志 | Third Sister Liu |
| 1962 | 1st | Wu Yinxian 吴印咸 | Keep the Red Flag Flying\红旗谱 |
