= List of animated feature films of the 2020s =

This is a list of animated feature films first released or planned for release in the 2020s.

- List of animated feature films of 2020
- List of animated feature films of 2021
- List of animated feature films of 2022
- List of animated feature films of 2023
- List of animated feature films of 2024
- List of animated feature films of 2025
- List of animated feature films of 2026
- List of animated feature films of 2027
- List of animated feature films of 2028
- List of animated feature films of 2029

== Unscheduled ==
Title	Country	Director	Production company(s)	Animation type	Ref.
Untitled The Addams Family film	United States	TBA	Amazon MGM Studios	TBA	
The Adventure Time Movie	United States	TBA	Cartoon Network Studios; Frederator Films	Traditional	
The Amazing World of Gumball: The Movie!	United Kingdom	Ben Bocquelet	Hanna-Barbera Studios Europe	Traditional; Computer; Live-action; Stop motion	
Untitled Barbie film	United States	TBA	Universal Pictures; Illumination; Mattel Studios	Computer	
Big Tree	United States	TBA	Universal Pictures; Illumination; Amblin Entertainment	Computer	
Black Knight	United States	Genndy Tartakovsky	Sony Pictures Animation	Computer	
Bob the Builder	United States	TBA	Amazon MGM Studios; Mattel Studios; ShadowMachine; Nuyorican Productions	TBA	
The Buried Giant	United States	Guillermo del Toro	Netflix Animation; ShadowMachine	Stop motion	
The Circus Ship	United States	TBA	Available Light Productions; Trustbridge Entertainment	TBA	
Death Stranding	Japan	TBA	Kojima Productions; Line Mileage	TBA	
A Dozen Tough Jobs	United States	TBA	Lion Forge Entertainment	TBA	
Dropz	United States	Rob Letterman	Paramount Animation; Gloria Sanchez Productions	TBA	
Emily the Strange	United States	TBA	Warner Bros. Pictures; Warner Bros. Pictures Animation; Bad Robot	TBA	
Forestina	United States	TBA	Warner Bros. Pictures; Warner Bros. Pictures Animation	TBA	
Frozen 4	United States	TBA	Walt Disney Animation Studios	Computer	
Untitled Futurama film	United States	TBA	20th Century Studios; 20th Century Animation; The Curiosity Company	Traditional	
Untitled The Garfield Movie sequel	United States	TBA	Alcon Entertainment; DNEG Animation	Computer	
Untitled Ghostbusters spin-off film	United States	Kris Pearn	Netflix; Columbia Pictures; Sony Pictures Animation; Ghost Corps	Computer	
The Goon	United States	Patrick Osborne	Netflix Animation; Blur Studio	Computer	
Harry and the Mutant Mid-Century Furniture	United States	Michael Skolnick	TBA	Computer	
Hell Followed with Us	United States	TBA	Trustbridge Entertainment; Anarchrists United	TBA	
The Honey Wars	Ireland	John Boorman	Kavaleer Productions	TBA	
Hungry Ghosts	United States	Charlie Bean	Sony Pictures Animation	TBA	
I, Chihuahua	United States; United Kingdom	Jorge R. Gutierrez	Mexopolis; Snafu Pictures	Computer	
I Eat Poop: A Dung Beetle Story	United States	Josh Cooley	Paramount Animation; Maximum Effort; Ampersand	TBA	
I'm Still Alive	Belgium; Israel; Italy	Roberto Saviano	Mad Entertainment; Sipur	TBA	
Untitled Jack and the Beanstalk project	United States	Rich Moore	Netflix; Skydance Animation	Computer	
Untitled John Wick prequel	United States	Shannon Tindle	Lionsgate; Thunder Road Films; 87North Productions	TBA	
The Jurassic League	United States	TBA	Warner Bros. Animation; DC Studios	TBA	
Untitled Lego film	United States	Aaron and Adam Nee	Universal Pictures; The Lego Group; Rideback	Live-action animation	
Madagascar 4	United States	TBA	Universal Pictures; DreamWorks Animation	Computer	
Meerkat Manor	United States	TBA	Warner Bros. Pictures; Warner Bros. Pictures Animation; The Green Room; Oxford Scientific Films; ITV Studios	Computer	
Meet The Flintstones	United States	Todd Wilderman; Hamish Grieve	Warner Bros. Pictures; Warner Bros. Pictures Animation	Computer	
MegaRacer	South Korea	TBA	TBA	TBA	
Mice and Mystics	United States	Alexandre Aja	Universal Pictures; DreamWorks Animation; Vertigo Entertainment	Computer	
Mighty Mouse	United States	TBA	Paramount Animation; Maximum Effort	TBA	
Untitled The Mitchells vs. the Machines sequel	United States	Guillermo Martinez; JP Sans	Netflix; Sony Pictures Animation; Lord Miller Productions	Computer	
Moana 3	United States	TBA	Disney; Walt Disney Animation Studios	Computer	
Monkey Base	Australia	TBA	SLR Productions; Sinking Ship Entertainment	Computer	
Monster Mash	United States	TBA	Miramax	TBA	
Untitled Moomins film	United States	Rebecca Sugar	Annapurna Animation	TBA	
Untitled Monsters, Inc. third film	United States	TBA	Disney; Pixar Animation Studios	Computer	
Untitled Mr. Men film	United Kingdom; France	TBA	StudioCanal; Heyday Films; Sanrio	TBA	
Untitled musical film	United States	Domee Shi	Disney; Pixar Animation Studios	Computer	
Mutant: Year Zero	United Kingdom	Hasraf Dulull	Pathfinder; HaZ Films; Heroic Signatures	Computer	
Muttnik	United States	TBA	Paramount Animation; Imagine Entertainment	TBA	
The Night Gardener	United States	Travis Knight	Laika	Stop motion	
No Sleep	United States	TBA	Amazon MGM Studios	TBA	
The Nut Job 3	South Korea; United States	TBA	Universal Pictures; DreamWorks Animation; Available Light Productions	TBA	
The Ocean at the End of the Lane	United States	Henry Selick	TBA	Stop motion	
Once Upon a Motorcycle Dude	United States	TBA	Paramount Animation	TBA	
Piranesi	United States	Travis Knight	Laika	Stop motion	
Penelope of Sparta	French	TBA	Fortiche Production	Computer	
Penny Phantom	United States	Daron Nefcy	Available Light Productions	TBA	
Peanut Jones	United States	TBA	Warner Bros. Pictures; Warner Bros. Pictures Animation	TBA	
Untitled The Pink Panther film	United States	Jeff Fowler	Metro-Goldwyn-Mayer; Rideback	Live-action animation	
Rainbow Brite	United States	TBA	Hallmark Media; Crayola Studios; Original Film	Computer	
Rainbow Serpent	United States	Ron Howard	Paramount Animation; Imagine Entertainment	Computer	
Real Pigeons Fight Crime	United States	TBA	Paramount Animation	TBA	
Roboken	United States	TBA	Sony Pictures Animation	TBA	
Ronan Boyle and the Book of Riddles	United States	Fergal Reilly	Universal Pictures; DreamWorks Animation	Computer	
Santa on a Panda	United States	TBA	Toonz Media Group; Dumb Idea Group	TBA	
The Secret Life of Pets 3	United States	TBA	Universal Pictures; Illumination	Computer	
Sing 3	United States	TBA	Universal Pictures; Illumination	Computer	
Slime	United States	Jeron Braxton	Mad Solar; Hammerstone Studios; Capstone Global	TBA	
Snoopy Unleashed	United States	Steve Martino	Apple Studios; WildBrain Studios; Peanuts Worldwide	Computer	
Untitled Speedy Gonzales film	United States	Jorge R. Gutierrez	Warner Bros. Pictures; Warner Bros. Pictures Animation	TBA	
Untitled Spider-Punk film	United States	TBA	Columbia Pictures; Sony Pictures Animation	Computer	
Untitled Spider-Woman film	United States	Lauren Montgomery	Columbia Pictures; Sony Pictures Animation	Computer	
Sputnik's Guide to Life on Earth	United States	TBA	Universal Pictures; DreamWorks Animation	Computer	
Supercolossal	United States	TBA	Warner Bros. Pictures; Warner Bros. Pictures Animation; Bad Robot	TBA	
Superworld	United States	TBA	Paramount Animation; Temple Hill Entertainment	Computer	
Swan Lake	United States	TBA	Paramount Animation; Temple Hill Entertainment	TBA	
Teddy Ruxpin	United States	TBA	Amazon MGM Studios; Seven Bucks Productions; Story Kitchen	Live-action animated	
Thomas & Friends	United States	Marc Forster	2Dux^{2} Mattel Studios	Live-action animated	
Untitled Tim Burton stop-motion film	United States	Tim Burton	Tim Burton Productions	Stop motion	
Untitled Tom and Jerry film	United States	TBA	Warner Bros. Pictures; Warner Bros. Pictures Animation	TBA	
The Trumpet of the Swan	United States	TBA	HarperCollins Productions; Hobie Films	TBA	
Tumble Leaf, The Movie	United States	Drew Hodges	Bix Pix Entertainment; Citizen Skull	Stop motion	
Wed Wabbit	United Kingdom	Olly Reid	Locksmith Animation; Cantilever Media; Timeless Films	Computer	
Which Way To Anywhere	United States	TBA	Warner Bros. Pictures; Warner Bros. Pictures Animation	TBA	
Whac-A-Mole	United States	TBA	TriStar Pictures; Mattel Studios	Live-action animation	
The White Tower	United States	Jay Oliva	iwot Electric Brain Entertainment; Squeeze Animation Studios	Computer	
The Wild Robot Escapes	United States	Troy Quane	Universal Pictures; DreamWorks Animation	Computer	
The Wizards of Once	United States	TBA	Universal Pictures; DreamWorks Animation	Computer	
Yokai Samba	United States	Leo Matsuda	Paramount Animation	TBA	
Zootopia 3	United States	Byron Howard; Jared Bush	Disney; Walt Disney Animation Studios	Computer	

== See also ==
- List of highest-grossing animated films of the 2020s
