= Hundred Flowers Award for Best Art Direction =

Chinese film award

The Hundred Flowers Award for Best Art Direction was first awarded by the China Film Association in 1962.

== 1980s ==
Year	Number	Director	Film
1980	3rd	Huang Qiagui 黄洽贵	After the Blue Spot\蓝光闪过之后

== 1960s ==
Year	Number	Director	Film
1963	2nd	Tong Jingwen 童景文; Zhang Qiwang 张起旺	Third Sister Liu\刘三姐
1962	1st	Ding Chen 丁辰	The Magic Aster\马兰花
