= List of Albanian animated films of the 1970s =

This is a list of animated films produced in Albania during the 1970s.

== Animated films ==
- Vajza me pata (1975)
- Zana dhe Miri (1975)
- Kalleza e grurit (1976)
- Lisharesi (1976)
- Majlinda dhe zogu i vogël (1976)
- Pika e ujit (1976)
- Festa e pranverës (1977)
- Oreksi i humbur (1977)
- Shoferi i vogël (1977)
- Zhgaravinat (1977)
- Aksioni dhe lodrat (1978)
- Katër fotografitë (1978)
- Ketri ndihmon shokun (1978)
- Mirela (1978)
- Shqiponja dhe Sokoli (1978)
- Arushi hap tokë të re (1979)
- Erinda dhe kukulla (1979)
- Gishto trimi (1979)
- Llustra Llustra (1979)
- Mullari që vrapon (1979)
