= Hundred Flowers Award for Best Animation =

Chinese film award

The Hundred Flowers Award for Best Animation was first awarded by the China Film Association in 1962.

== 1980s ==
Year	Number	Film
1980	3rd	Prince Nezha's Triumph Against Dragon King / 哪吒闹海

== 1960s ==
Year	Number	Film
1963	2nd	The Monkey King / 大闹天宫
1962	1st	Baby Tadpoles Look for Their Mother / 小蝌蚪找妈妈
