= Little Tadpoles Looking for Mama =

1960 film directed by Te Wei

Little Tadpoles Looking for Mama (Chinese: 小蝌蚪找妈妈, Xiao Kedou zhao Mama) is a short Chinese animated film produced by Shanghai Animation Film Studio in 1960 under the artistic guidance of Te Wei. The narrated film describes the adventures and misadventures of a group of tadpoles in search of their mother. It is one of Te Wei's first attempts to break away from Western style animation and aim for a painterly style influenced by Qi Baishi and more in keeping with native Chinese aesthetic sensibilities. Because of its simple story line and repetitive script it is ideal for children who are beginning their study of the Chinese language.

The film tells the story of a frog mother who leaves after laying tadpole eggs. The eggs slowly grow tails and turn into a group of tadpoles. After their shrimp father-in-law describes the characteristics of their mother, they decide to look for her. Along the way, they mistake goldfish, crabs, turtles, and catfish for their mother. Finally, the tadpoles find their mother.

In October 2021, Xigua Video and Volcano Engine announced that they would spend one year repairing 100 classic animations and use technology to restore these classic works to the greatest extent possible. Tadpole Looking for Mom was among these animations.

Since the beginning of the last century, traditional cultural elements such as Chinese painting, paper-cutting, and shadow puppets have been widely used in animation production. Popular domestic animations such as Tadpole Looking for Mom have attracted a large number of fans around the world.

== Characters ==
=== Tadpole ===
After the tadpoles were born, they started to play around. They first met the chicks and saw the chicks and the chicken mother together. After being stimulated, they started to look for their mothers. They met first, the shrimp father-in-law asked about the appearance of the frog mother, and then met crabs, turtles, goldfish, catfish, and finally meet the frog mother who rescues the tadpoles from the catfish.

=== Chicken family ===
The chick and the tadpole became good friends, and then the mother chicken came to look for the chick. The tadpole thought of its mother and started looking for her.

=== Mr. Shrimp ===
The tadpoles met Father Shrimp first and asked him about their mother's appearance. Father Shrimp told them that their mother had two big eyes.

=== Goldfish ===
Because they have two big eyes, the tadpoles happily call the goldfish "Mom" when they see it, but the goldfish says that the tadpole's mother has a white belly.

=== Crab ===
Because they have white bellies, when the tadpoles see a crab with a white belly, they all call the crab "Mom", but the crabs say that their mother only has four legs.

=== Turtle family ===
Because it has four legs, the tadpoles saw that the turtle had exactly four legs and thought that the turtle was their mother. However, the little turtle said that this was its mother because it looked the same as the mother.

== Creators ==
| English Production | Crew | Original Version | Romanized |
|---|---|---|---|
| Art Direction | 艺术指导 | 特伟 | Te Wei |
| Technical Guidance | 技术指导 | 钱家骏 | Qian Jiajun |
| Animation Design | 动画设计 | 唐澄 邬强 严定宪 徐景达 戴铁郎 矫野松 林文肖 段浚 蒲家祥 吕晋 杨素英 葛桂云 | Tang Cheng; Qiang Qiang; Yan Dingxian; Xu Jingda; Dai Tielang; Jiao Yesong; Lin Wenxiao; Duan Yi; Pu Jiaxiang; Lu Jin; Yang Suying; Ge Guiyun |
| Background Design | 背景设计 | 郑少如 方澎年 | Zheng Shaoru; Fang Yurian |
| Photography | 摄影 | 段孝萱 游涌 王世荣 | Duan Xiaoyu; You Yong; Wang Shirong |
| Composer | 作曲 | 吴应炬 | Wu Yingju |
