= List of South African animated feature films =

This is a list of South African animated films. It includes theatrical films, some important short films, and international films in which South Africa's production houses and studios were involved.

== Notable short films ==
Title	Year	Director(s)	Studio	Notes	Ref.
Little Bang	2006	Diek Grobler	Fopspeen Moving Pictures	Stop-motion object and puppet animation. SAFTA Nomination for best animated short. Ekhuruleni Art Merit Award for new media.	
Agenda	2007	Diek Grobler	Fopspeen Moving Pictures	Stop-motion object and puppet animation. SAFTA award for best animation in a short film. Best Shorrt film award, Arficala African Film festival, Mexico, 2009	
The Rise and Fall of Tony the Frog	2008		Ambient Animation	CG animation	
Het vogeltjes ABC	2008	Diek Grobler	Fopspeen Moving Pictures	Best film for Children at Teheran International animation festival, Iran. Best film for Children at Tindirindis International animation Festival, Lithuania. Best film for Children at KROK International Animation festival, Ukraine.	
n Gewone Blou Maandagoggend	2014	Naomi van Niekerk	Dryfsand Films	Poetry-film of a poem by Ronelda S.Kamfer. Awarded the Jean-Luc Xiberras Award for Best First Film at Annecy Animation Festival 2016.	
What about de law	2014	Charles Badenhorst	Bittervrug	Poetry-film of a poem by Adam Small. Winner of the Weimar Poetry-film prize, Germany (2016), and the first animated film to be included in the art collection of the South African Constitutional Court.	
Please Frog, just one sip	2018	Diek Grobler	Fopspeen Moving Pictures	An African retelling of the Australian Tidalik legend, the film is based on a book by international illustrator Piet Grobler. Special Award at Hiroshima International Animation Festival 2018.	
Ruby & Roach	2019	Erentia Bedeker	Abyss Productions	Best South African Short Film 2020 (Durban International Film Festival) Best African Short Film 2020 (Durban International Film Festival) Best Children Film (Tbilisi International Animation Festival (TIAF) 2020) Best Music Video/Music Films award (Blu-Hill Film Festival Season 3, 2021) Best Animation Short Film (Onyko Films Awards – May 2021 selection) Gold medallist Best Sound Design Category (1st Film Olympiad Grand Prix 2021) Bronze medallist, Best Animation Category (1st Film Olympiad Grand Prix 2021) Best Original Score (New York Indie Shorts Awards, April – August 2021 season) Best Animation (Cannes Indie Cinema Awards 4th Edition, 2021)	

== Feature films ==
Year	Title International Title	Director(s)	Studio	Technique	Notes
2007	Tengers	Michael J. Fix	Mirror Mountain Pictures; Ster Kinekor Pictures	Clay animation	
2011	The Lion of Judah	Deryck Broom; Roger Hawkins	Animated Family Films; Character Matters; Sunrise Productions; Rocky Mountain Pictures	CG Animation	
2011	Jock the Hero Dog	Duncan McNeillie	Jock Animation; ARC Entertainment	CG Animation	
2012	Zambezia	Wayne Thornley	Triggerfish Animation Studios; Sony Pictures; Cinema Management Group	CG Animation	Africa Movie Academy Award for best animation Nominated for Annie award for Music in an Animated Feature Production and Voice Acting in an Animated Feature Production
2013	Khumba	Anthony Silverston	Triggerfish Animation Studios; Millennium Entertainment; Cinema Management Group	CG Animation	Zanzibar International Film Festival for best animationAfrica Movie Academy Award for best animation Nominated for best feature; Annecy Animation Festival .
2019	Bru & Boegie: The Movie	Mike Scott	Mike Scott Animation	2D Animation	South Africa's first feature-length 2D animated film.
2020	Jungle Beat: The Movie	Brent Dawes	Sandcastle Studios; Sunrise Productions; Timeless Films	CG Animation	
2021	Seal Team	Greig Cameron; Kane Croudace	Triggerfish Animation Studios; Cinema Management Group	CG Animation	
2023	Headspace	Paul Meyer; Gerhard Painter	Luma Animation; The Ergo Company	CG Animation	
2025	Jungle Beat 2: The Past	Sam Wilson; Brent Dawes	Sunrise Productions; Sandcastle Studios	CG Animation	
