= List of Albanian animated films of the 1990s =

This is a list of animated films produced in Albania during the 1990s.

== Animated films ==
- Dy vëllezërit (1990)
- Ëndërra që nuk vritet (1990)
- Fantazisti (1990)
- Kënga e fundit (1990)
- Kopshtari (1990)
- Luani dhe miu (1990)
- Mall (1990)
- Mustaqet e mbretit (1990)
- Sa nata dita (1990)
- Talenti i babait (1990)
- Zogu dhe hija e tij (1991)
- Kompozim (1992)
- Kush qesh i fundit (1992)
- Maratona e lavdisë (1992)
- Rekuiem (1992)
- Ujku, ujku (1992)
- Djali dhe Ofi (1993)
- Gjëra që nuk ndryshojnë (1993)
- Gjigandi i vetmuar (1993)
- Trëndafili magjik (1993)
- Biba (1994)
- Ekstremisti (1994)
- I vdekuri dhe i gjalli (1994)
- Kumbari i vdekjes (1994)
- Mbreti i bretkosave (1994)
- Mikesha (1994)
- Ringjallje (1994)
- Triptik (1994)
- Marioneta (1995)
- Dashuri në katër stinë (1996)
- Sizifiane (1996)
- Balada e druvarit plak (1997)
- Bashkë me perëndimin e diellit (1997)
- Lojë e përjetshme (1997)
- Sipas kapeles kokën (1997)
