= Hundred Flowers Award for Best Co-produced Film =

Chinese film award

The Hundred Flowers Award for Best Co-produced Film was first awarded by the China Film Association in 1994.

== 1990s ==
Year	Number	Film	Country
1996	19th	The Bewitching Braid\大辫子的诱惑	(China) \ (Hong Kong)
1995	18th	Heaven & Earth\天与地	(China) \ (United States)
1994	17th	Once Upon A Time In China III\狮王争霸	(China) \ (Hong Kong)
