= Hundred Flowers Award for Best Chinese Opera Film =

Chinese film award

The Hundred Flowers Award for Best Chinese Opera Film was first awarded by the China Film Association in 1962.

== 1980s ==
Year	Number	Film
1980	3rd	Iron Bow\铁弓缘

== 1960s ==
Year	Number	Film
1963	2nd	Monkey Subdues White-Skeleton Demon\孙悟空三打白骨精
1962	1st	Hero Yang\杨门女将
