= List of Albanian animated films of the 1980s =

This is a list of animated films produced in Albania during the 1980s.

== Animated films ==
- Agroni dhe nafta (1980)
- Dordoleci (1980)
- Edi dhe nota 4 (1980)
- Kau dhe ujku (1980)
- Kur shefi merr flakë (1980)
- Milingonat dhe fidanët (1980)
- Arushi kërkon babanë (1981)
- Autogol (1981)
- Dhelpra dhe iriqi (1981)
- Djaloshi prej bore (1981)
- Gënjeshtra i ka këmbët e shkurtra (1981)
- Lufta për jetën (1981)
- Puna është flori (1981)
- Stop kundravajtje! (1981)
- Vath në vesh (1981)
- Zemërimi i shkronjave (1981)
- Ah lepurusha, lepurusha! (1982)
- Bishti (1982)
- Djaloshi i lirisë (1982)
- Dy gostitë (1982)
- Kecat dhe ujku (1982)
- Maja e penës dhe aeroplani prej letre (1982)
- Ndodhitë e Çufos (1982)
- Njeriu prej bore (1982)
- Bilbili mendjelehtë (1983)
- Bredhi midis nesh (1983)
- Dhurata e 1 qershorit (1983)
- Djali dhe peneli (1983)
- Iliria (1983)
- Jo kështu Piku! (1983)
- Në pyllin me bredha (1983)
- Nevoja të ndihmon (1983)
- Omeri i ri (1983)
- Pipiruku pret dy "miq" (1983)
- Qershiza mendjelehtë (1983)
- Të papriturat e Bardhoshit (1983)
- Toçi dhe Poçi (1983)
- Zemërimi (1983)
- Zogu pushbardhë, seria 1 (1983)
- Zogu pushbardhë, seria 2 (1983)
- Ditë korrjesh (1984)
- Era dhe balona (1984)
- Gara e milingonave (1984)
- Gjimnastika e ariut (1984)
- Lulja magjike (1984)
- Një ndodhi në stan (1984)
- Perandoria me kokë poshtë (1984)
- Përparësja e Bletës (1984)
- Trimëri e çuditshme (1984)
- Zogu pushbardhë, seria 3 (1984)
- Zogu pushbardhë, seria 4 (1984)
- Bleta e vogël (1985)
- Dimri dhe fëmijët (1985)
- Elkana dhe dallëndyshja (1985)
- Jo kështu, Piku! pjesa 2 (1985)
- Kur bieb puplat (1985)
- Merimanga dhe brumbulli (1985)
- Një natë pa gjumë (1985)
- Pipiruku në pallat (1985)
- Plumb ballit (1985)
- Zëri i gjakut, zëri i tokës (1985)
- Zogu pushbardhë, pjesa 5 (1985)
- Bleta dhe pëllumbi (1986)
- Breshka dhe lepuri (1986)
- Dy vëllezërit dhe ujku (1986)
- Ëndërra në diell (1986)
- Frymëzimi (1986)
- Lodrat e Mirit (1986)
- Orët e Gentit (1986)
- Piku në gjah (1986)
- Robinsoni dhe shpëtimtarët (1986)
- Si bëri gjeti (1986)
- Tik taku i fundit (1986)
- Variacione mbi temën (1986)
- Zogu pushbardhë (1986)
- Burri është burrë (1987)
- I gjithë qyteti qesh (1987)
- Kercuri (1987)
- Kështu po! (1987)
- Mundi që shkon kot (1987)
- Pas një zënke (1987)
- Të mëdha të vogla (1987)
- Ushtari mburravec (1987)
- Abetarja dhe zogjtë e Oltës (1987)
- Busti (1988)
- Gjëra që ndodhin (1988)
- Gjethja (1988)
- Lisi (1988)
- Mendje, Mendje (1988)
- Pendesa e arushit (1988)
- Për një arrë (1988)
- Përsëri të gëzuar (1988)
- Peshorja (1988)
- Piku me lëkurë dhelpre (1988)
- Pipiruku në hambar (1988)
- Sinfonia e pyllit (1988)
- Unë (1988)
- Veza e rrallë (1988)
- Vizatim me një zog (1988)
- Arbitri, arbitri (1989)
- Fidani (1989)
- Kampioni (1989)
- Kërpudha (1989)
- Kush e meriton (1989)
- Lëkura e luanit (1989)
- Parrullat (1989)
- Portreti (1989)
- Pushbardhi në spital (1989)
- Shtëpia e bukur (1989)
- Vur kopan (1989)
