= Frederator cartoon shorts filmography =

These are the filmographies for the cartoon shorts series created by American animation producer Fred Seibert at and the animation production company he founded, Frederator Studios. His previous shorts series, What A Cartoon!, was produced while he was president at Hanna-Barbera.

== Oh Yeah! Cartoons shorts (1998-2002) ==
Oh Yeah! Cartoons was Fred Seibert's second cartoon incubator and Frederator Studios' first production, with 99 original shorts exhibited on Nickelodeon. The shorts are listed in the order that they originally aired.

The series spin-offs were The Fairly OddParents, ChalkZone, and My Life as a Teenage Robot.

Season/Ep.	Segment	Creator	Original airdate	Synopsis	Cast	Series/Short
1/1	"ChalkZone"	Bill Burnett & Larry Huber	1998			Series
1/1	"What is Funny?"	Bill Burnett & Vincent Waller	1998			Short
1/1	"Jelly's Day"	Greg Emison & Bill Burnett	1998			Short
1/2	"F-Tales"	Rob Renzetti	1998			Short
1/2	"Teddy & Art"	Alex Kirwan	1998			Short
1/2	"Cat & Milkman"	Miles Thompson	1998			Short
1/3	"Jamal the Funny Frog"	Pat Ventura	1998			Short
1/3	"Thatta Boy"	Alex Kirwan	1998			Short
1/3	"Hobart: The Weedkeeper"	Greg Emison & Bill Burnett	1998			Short
1/4	"Protecto 5000"	John Eng	1998			Short
1/4	"Ask Edward"	Rob Renzetti	1998			Short
1/4	"Peter Patrick, Private Investigator"	Vincent Waller	1998			Short
1/5	"Max's Special Problem"	Dave Wasson	1998			Short
1/5	"Tutu the Superina"	Bill Burnett	1998			Short
1/5	"Blotto"	Byron Vaughns	1998			Short
1/6	"Tales from the Goose Lady: Jack & the Beanstalk	Dave Wasson	1998			Short
1/6	"Twins Crimson"	Carlos Ramos	1998			Short
1/6	"Olly & Frank"	Bob Boyle	1998			Short
1/7	"Kitty the Hapless Cat"	Zac Moncrief	1998			Short
1/7	"A Cop & His Donut"	Rob Renzetti	1998			Short
1/7	"Enchanted Tales"	John Eng	1998			Short
1/8	"The Fairly OddParents	Butch Hartman	1998			Series
1/8	"Hobart & the Merman"	Greg Emison & Bill Burnett	1998			Short
1/8	"Super Santa"	Mike Bell	1998			Short
1/9	"Apex Cartoon Props"	Larry Huber	1998			Short
1/9	"That's My Pop"	Pat Ventura	1998			Short
1/9	"Hubbykins & Sweetypie"	Rob Renzetti	1998			Short
1/10	"The Man with No Nose"	Larry Huber	1998			Short
1/10	"Youngstar 3"	Miles Thompson	1998			Short
1/10	"Hey Look!"	Harvey Kurtzman; directed by Vincent Waller	1998			Short
1/11	"ChalkZone: The Amazin' River"	Bill Burnett & Larry Huber	1998			Series
1/11	"Tales from the Goose Lady: Hamsel and Grande"	Dave Wasson	1998			Short
1/11	"The Feelers"	Bill Burnett	1998			Short
1/12	"Planet Kate"		1998			Short
1/12	"Fat Head"		1998			Short
1/13	"Max & the Pigeon"	Dave Wasson	1998			Short
1/13	"Zoomates"	Seth MacFarlane; directed & designed by Butch Hartman	1998			Short
1/13	"Microcops"	John Eng	1998			Short
2/14	"ChalkZone: Rudy's Date"	Bill Burnett & Larry Huber	1999			Series
2/14	"A Kid's Life"	Ken Kessel	1999			Short
2/14	"The Fairly OddParents: Too Many Timmys"	Butch Hartman	1999			Series
2/15	"The Fairly OddParents: Where's the Wand"	Butch Hartman	1999			Series
2/15	"Magic Trixie"	Alex Kirwan	1999			Short
2/15	"Tales from the Goose Lady: Humpty Dumpty"	Dave Wasson	1999			Short
2/16	"Tales from the Goose Lady: Little Pigs 3"	Dave Wasson	1999			Short
2/16	"Freddy Seymore's Amazing Life"	Tim Biskup	1999			Short
2/16	"Jamal the Funny Frog: His Musical Moment"	Pat Ventura	1999			Short
2/17	"ChalkZone: Snap Out of Water"	Bill Burnett & Larry Huber	1999			Series
2/17	"Earth to Obie"	Guy Vasilovich	1999			Short
2/17	"Mina & The Count: Ghoul's Tribunal"	Rob Renzetti	1998			Short
2/18	"ChalkZone: Secret Passages"	Bill Burnett & Larry Huber	1999			Series
2/18	"Kid From S.C.H.O.O.L."	Bob Boyle & Bill Riling	1999			Short
2/18	"Mina & The Count: The Vampire Who Came to Dinner"	Rob Renzetti	1999			Short
2/19	"The Fairly OddParents: Party of 3	Butch Hartman	1999			Series
2/19	"The Forgotten Toy Box: Curse of the Were Baby"	Mike Bell	1999			Short
2/19	"Jelly's Day: Uncle Betty Comes to Visit"	Greg Emison & Bill Burnett	1999			Short
2/20	"ChalkZone: ChalkDad"	Bill Burnett & Larry Huber	1999			Series
2/20	"A Dog & His Boy"	Carlos Ramos	1999			Short
2/20	"Mina & the Count: Playing a Hunch"	Rob Renzetti	1999			Short
2/21	"The Fairly OddParents: The Fairy Flu	Butch Hartman	1999			Series
2/21	"Lollygagin'"	Guy Vasilovich	1999			Short
2/21	"Tales from the Goose Lady: The Tortoise & the Hairpiece"	Dave Wasson	1999			Short
2/22	"ChalkZone: Chalk Rain"	Bill Burnett & Larry Huber	1999			Series
2/22	"The Dan Danger Show"	Steve Marmel & Butch Hartman	1999			Short
2/22	"Mina & The Count: My Best Friend"	Rob Renzetti	1999			Short
2/23	"The Fairly OddParents: The Temp"	Butch Hartman	1999			Series
2/23	"Herb"	Antoine Guilbaud	1999			Short
2/23	"Jamal the Funny Frog: Milk Dreams"	Pat Ventura	1999			Short
2/24	"The Fairly OddParents: The Zappys"	Butch Hartman	1999			Series
2/24	"Let's Talk Turkey"	Vincent Waller	1999			Short
2/24	"Tales from the Goose Lady: Goldie Locks"	Dave Wasson	1999			Short
2/25	"ChalkZone: Rapunzel"	Bill Burnett & Larry Huber	1999			Series
2/25	"Zoey's Zoo"	Amy Anderson & David Burd	1999			Short
2/25	"My Neighbor is a Teenage Robot"	Rob Renzetti	1999			Series
2/26	"Jelly's Day: Auntie Broth"	Greg Emison & Bill Burnett	1999			Series
2/26	"Terry & Chris"	John Reynolds; directed by Btuch Hartman	1999			Short
2/26	"Mina & the Count: Franken Frog"	Rob Renzetti	1999			Short
3/27	"Dan Danger: Danger 101"	Steve Marmel & Butch Hartman	2002			Series
3/27	"The Tantrum"	John Fountain	2002			Short
3/27	"Super Santa: Naughty"	Mike Bell	2002			Short
3/28	"Super Santa: South Pole Joe"	Mike Bell	2002			Short
3/28	"Sick and Tired"	Andre Nieves & Ric Delcarmen	2002			Short
3/28	"Tales from the Goose Lady: The Ugly Duck Thing"	Dave Wasson	2002			Short
3/29	"The Fairly OddParents: Scouts Honor"	Butch Hartman	2002			Series
3/29	"Skippy Spankerton"	Eric & Michelle Bryan	2002			Short
3/29	"Jamal, the Funny Frog: Beach"	Pat Ventura	2002			Short
3/30	"Super Santa: Vegetation"	Mike Bell	2002			Series
3/30	"Elise"	Guy Vasilovich	2002			Short
3/30	"A Kid's Life: Picture Perfect"	Ken Kessel	2002			Short
3/30	"The Boy Who Cried Alien"	Guy Vasilovich	2002			Short
3/31	"Baxter and Bananas"	Zac Moncrief	2002			Short
3/31	"Dan Danger: A Lighter Shade of Danger"	Steve Marmel & Butch Hartman	2002			Short
3/31	"The Kameleon Kid"	Russ Mooney & Jaime Diaz	2002			Short
3/32	"The Semprini Triplets"	Pat Ventura	2002			Short
3/32	"Jamal, the Funny Frog: Camping"	Pat Ventura	2002			Short
3/32	"Dan Danger: A Date With Danger"	Steve Marmel & Butch Hartman	2002			Short

== Random! Cartoons (2008–2009) ==
The original 39 Random! Cartoons shorts were supervised by series creator Fred Seibert and produced by Eric Homan and Kevin Kolde as Frederator Studios's third cartoon incubator. Exhibited on Nickelodeon. The shorts are listed in the order that they originally aired.

Spin-off series were Adventure Time, Fanboy & Chum Chum, and Bravest Warriors.

Prod. no.	Segment	Creator	Original airdate	Synopsis	Cast	Series/Short
1	"Solomon Fix"	Doug TenNapel	December 6, 2008	A teddy bear named Solomon Fix is assigned to protect a child named Ned, only that the child finds him lame.	Rob Paulsen as Solomon Fix; John DiMaggio as Mumpy; Maurice LaMarche as Klemp; Elijah Runcorn as Ned; Doug TenNapel as Chipmonk#1 & 2	Short
1	"MooBeard: The Cow Pirate"	Kyle A. Carrozza	December 6, 2008	Moobeard with his companion Sailor Bird searches the treasure of the lost island of Hookamookapookalap.	Billy West as Moobeard / Value Guy; Erica Luttrell as Sailor Bird / Road Show Announcer; Dave "Gruber" Allen as Darkblade of Fire; Kyle Carrozza as Ungus the Unpleasant / Cow Eating Gentleman	Short
1	"Two Witch Sisters"	Niki Yang	December 6, 2008	Twin witch sisters are causing magic-induced havoc at a park.	S. Scott Bullock as Dorothy / Hummingbird; Dee Bradley Baker as Carrot / Seymour; Candi Milo as Bee; Niki Yang as Baby Rabbit	Short
2	"The Finster Finster Show!: Store Wars"	Jeff DeGrandis	December 7, 2008	Two Finsters battle anthropomorphic frozen chickens in the supermarket.	Billy West as Finster 1 Charlie Adler as Finster 2 Tress MacNeille as Finsters' Mom	Short
2	"Adventure Time"	Pendleton Ward	December 7, 2008	In this precursor to the critically acclaimed full-length series, Finn (known as "Penn" in the short) and Jake battle the Ice King to save Princess Bubblegum.	Zack Shada as Penn; John DiMaggio as Jake / Ice Clops; Paige Moss as Princess Bubblegum; John Kassir as Ice King / Fire Element; Dee Bradley Baker as Lady Rainicorn / Snow Golem; Pendleton Ward as Abraham Lincoln / Old Man	TV series
2	"Mind the Kitty"	Anne Walker	December 7, 2008	Three teens have to babysit a psychotic kitten girl.	Dee Bradley Baker as the Duck/Tabby; Jeff Bennett as Punky; Rodger Bumpass as Lemurman; Lynne Maclean as Tabby's Mom	Short
3	"Ivan the Unbearable"	Andrew Dickman	December 13, 2008	A clumsy Viking gets hiccups that causes destruction.	Jeff Doucette as Ivan the Unbearable/Olaf; Maurice LaMarche as Bjorn/Working Troll #1; Tress MacNeille as Ma; Andrew Dickman as Filthy Viking/Working Troll #2	Short
3	"Boneheads"	Hadley Hudson	December 13, 2008	Roccos and Bone search for babanas.	John Kassir as Bone/Soldier Flies; Dee Bradley Baker as Roccos/Audrey/Antarctic Bull Snail/Rex; Hadley Hudson as Striker (uncredited)	Short
3	"Tiffany"	Adam Henry	December 13, 2008	A doll must help her friend overcome a fear of horses.	Jessie Flower as Peggy; Colleen Villard as Tiffany; David Busch as Dad/Jockey/Racetrack Announcer	Short
4	"Call Me Bessie!"	Diane Kredensor and Dana Galin	December 20, 2008	A cow enrolls her friend in a scuba-diving class...but her friend does not want to go!	Audrey Wasilewski as Bessie; Fred Stoller as Al; Dee Bradley Baker as Senor Swampy/Turkey/Dolphins	Short
4	"Teapot"	Greg Eagles	December 20, 2008	Two African-American kids that are fans of rap music are going to meet a famous rapper.	Greg Eagles as Teapot/James Brown Clock/Silkbone/Blind Guy/Body Guard; Cathy Lewis as Bouche; Hilda Boulware as Mother's Voice; Chara Hammonds as Video Vixen#1 & 2 deMann as Announcer	Short
4	"Hornswiggle"	Jerry Beck	December 20, 2008	A crazy rhino meets his hero, Zantar. He tries to help but physically hurts him.	René Auberjonois as Hornswiggle/Apeman #2; Jeff Bennett as Zan-Tar/Apeman #1; Maurice LaMarche as Birdsdorf, Apeman #3; Cheryl Chase as Nurses #1 & 2	Short
5	"Hero Heights"	Raul Aguirre Jr. and Bill Ho	December 27, 2008	In a town where everyone's a superhero, two best friends fight over the new girl in town.	Jessica DiCicco as Smart Alec/Plasma Tot; Annie Mumolo as Strikeout; Hynden Walch as Olympia/Ms. Chic; Raul Aguirre as Razorklaw; Becky Thyre as Electricia; Karen Malina White as Mindy 500	Short
5	"Yaki & Yumi"	Aliki Theofilopoulous	December 27, 2008	A bat and a dragon participate in a dance competition.	André Sogliuzzo as Yaki/Contest Judge; Candi Milo as Yumi/Octopus Dude; Aliki Theofilopolous as Sweet Little Girl/Fortune Fish/Kid #1	Short
5	"Gary Guitar"	Bill Plympton	December 27, 2008	A guitar tries to make the perfect picnic for his girlfriend, a violin.	Lloyd Floyd as Gary Guitar; Becky Poole as Vera Violin; Stephen Largay as Danny Drum	Short
6	"Krunch and the Kid"	Adam Henry	January 3, 2009		Kevin Michael Richardson as Krunch/Rastamon/Alarm Clock/Announcer; Colleen Villard as Skippy/Little Girl/Some Kid; Mark Hamill as Frank; Karen Henry as Perky Tour Guide	Short
6	"Bradwurst"	Angelo di Nallo and Jason Plapp	January 3, 2009	A grumpy sausage sabotages his friends' party.	Tom Kenny as Bradwurst/Jerry; Raphael Sbarge as Willy; Jeff Bennett as Charlie; J. P. Manoux as Gus	Short
6	"Dr. Froyd's Funny Farm"	Bill Burnett and Jaime Diaz	January 3, 2009	Dr. Froyd needs someone to test out a science experiment, but none of the animals on his funny farm want to!	Robert Cait as Dr. Froyd; Nika Futterman as Lulu; Candi Milo as Nurse Duckett; Charlie Adler as Bossy LeCow/Raging Bullfrog	Short
7	"Bravest Warriors"	Pendleton Ward	January 10, 2009	Four human teens, Chris, Beth, Wallo, and Danny, save the brain dogs from the tickle monster in outer space.	Charlie Schlatter as Chris; Tara Strong as Beth; Dan Finnerty as Wallo; Rob Paulsen as Danny; Polly Lou Livingston as Slippy Napkins; Noah Nelson as Professor Brain Dog 7	Web Series
7	"Giovanni and Navarro: The Dangerous Duck Brothers"	Pat Ventura	January 10, 2009	Two ducks want to break a dangerous record.	Jim MacGeorge as Giovanni; Chuck McCann as Navarro; Jeff Bennett as Dog	Short
7	"Sparkles and Gloom"	Melissa Wolfe and Anne Walker	January 10, 2009	Sparkles and Gloom, two daughters of handsome prince and an evil witch, have their powers switched before the talent show at the Geevil School, where good and evil are best friends.	Kari Wahlgren as Sparkles/Mom/Leprechaun; Jessica DiCicco as Gloom/Fuzzy Animal; Kevin Michael Richardson as Dad / Announcer / Zit / Applause Fish; Annie Mumolo as Pixie / Little Prince / Munchie	Short
8	"The Infinite Goliath"	Mike Gray and Erik Knutson	January 17, 2009	A super villain on parole moves into a neighborhood.	Kevin Michael Richardson as Infinite Goliath/Hondo/Mechaneck; Alanna Ubach as Roger/Mrs. Abbott/Samantha; S. Scott Bullock as Mr. Abbott/Dr. Carnage/Timmy	Short
8	"Kyle + Rosemary"	Jun Falkenstein	January 17, 2009	A geek and a goth who play MMORPG games must break their shells to be together.	Will Wheaton as Kyle/Sir Horace; Jentle Phoenix as Rosemary/Lunarella; Alexander Polinsky as Harold/Elf; Charlie Schlatter as Willy/Gnome/Martin/Dwarf; Aliki Theofilopoulous as Crimson	Short
8	"Garlic Boy"	John R. Dilworth	January 17, 2009	A garlic with a healing tonic wants to do good for folks.	Gary Littman as Garlic Boy; Gerrianne Raphael as Garlic Boy's Mom; Erik Bergmann as Garlic Boy's Dad; Betsy Beutler as Parsley; Lloyd Floyd as Fungus; John R. Dilworth as Twin #1/Twin #2	Short
9	"Flavio"	Mike Milo	January 24, 2009	An Italian goat wishes to be an inventor.	Rob Paulsen as Flavio; Robert Costanzo as Bossman; Stephen Stanton as Mr. Frank; John Mariano as Leonardo da Vinci/Mayor	Short
9	"SamSquatch"	Adam Muto	January 24, 2009	A cryptid hunter finds a Bigfoot named SamSquatch.	Max Burkholder as SamSquatch; Daran Norris as Conrad Conard; Dee Bradley Baker as Nessie, Karl, Momsquatch; Ja'net DuBois as Mom	Short
9	"Girls on the GO!: First Date"	Aliki Theofilopoulous	January 24, 2009	Katerina Metropolis is a hopeless romantic teenager that daydreams about meeting the perfect boy. But how will she manage after she winds up on the worst date of her life?	Danica McKellar as Kat; Frankie Ingrassia as Tess; Quinton Flynn as Spencer Applebaum/Spencer Spencerson/Student; LaTonya Holmes; Aliki Theofilopoulos	Short
10	"Victor the Delivery Dog"	Niki Yang	January 31, 2009	Victor has to make deliveries before dinnertime.	E.G. Daily as Victor/One-Eyed Bird/Co-Worker #1; Jennifer Hale as Victor's Mom/Express Mail/Co-Worker #3; S. Scott Bullock as Gi/Raffe/Co-Worker #2; Fred Tatasciore as Mr. Papier	Short
10	"The Bronk and Bongo Show: Losing Patients"	Manny Galán and Alan Goodman	January 31, 2009		Steve Purnick as Bronk/Dinosaur; Joel McCrary as Bongo/Skeleton; Adam Busch as Jerry/Orderly; Jeff Bennett as Patient/Geezer/Workman; Manny Galan as Angry Erik; Alan Goodman as Ted Strawberry Head	Short
10	"Thom Cat"	Mike Gray	January 31, 2009	A talking cat (surprising to everyone) helps a troubled girl from a bully.	Jim Meskimem as Thom Cat/Neighbor John/Stumpy; Annie Mumolo as Melissa/Rusty/Patch	Short
11	"Sugarfoot"	Erik Knutson	April 4, 2009	A boy whose a fan of cowboys and dinosaurs goes to a field trip to a museum with both of his interests while dealing with a bully.	Charlie Schlatter as Sugarfoot; Dee Bradley Baker as Socko and Delivery Man; Jennifer Hale as Ms. Penelope	Short
11	"Dugly Uckling's Treasure Quest"	Guy Vasilovich	April 4, 2009	Dugly Uckling and his ragtag crew are out to solve the mystery of the Golden Bobblehead. Battling their way through the swamp, jungles, and killer mosquitoes, they come to a place where only Dugly's nonsensical logic can save the day.	John Kassir as Dugly Uckling/Kung Pao Bunny; Carlos Alazraqui as Quiggims/Bobblehead; James Sie as narrator/Monkeybutt	Short
11	"Dr. Dee & BitBoy"	Jun-Kyo Seo, Kong-Yo Kang, and Larry Huber	April 4, 2009	Two kids and a scientist in a dog suit stop a corporation from creating a donut addiction.	Phil Nee as Dr. Dee/Bomba; Brett Pels as Zero (Bitboy)/Flower Wicky/Shop Owner; Jennie Kwan as Myang Myang/Bitgirl/Edu; Maurice LaMarche as Pickle Cop/Elecaptain Sam/Dog Catcher; Charles Kim as Black Violet; Lloyd Sherr as narrator	Short
12	"Super John Doe Junior"	Lincoln Peirce	April 11, 2009	The son of a superhero, who has no powers, decided to take his dad's place and fight against his nemesis	Jim Connor as Super John Doe; John Zee as Mayor; Marc Graue as Anchorman; Betsy Foldes as Mom; Kimberly Brooks as Super John Doe Jr. David Shaughnessey as Blimey; Sandy Fox as Robin; Andy Morris as Evil Butthead	Short
12	"6 Monsters"	Fred Seibert and Alan Goodman	April 11, 2009	Adventures of six monsters in high school presented in different styles of animation.	Jeff Bennett as Grandpa/Gaillard; Chuck McCann as Buck; John DiMaggio as Roy; Nika Futterman as Cathy; Teresa Ganzel as Lulu	Short
12	"Ratz-A-Fratz"	Jim Wyatt and Karl Toerge	April 11, 2009	Three hungry rats must escape a security guard.	Jess Harnell as Crank/Man at Cookie Nook; June Foray as Mall Walker/Old Man #1/Man at Garbage Can; Debi Derryberry as Pop Singer/Teen at Cookie Nook; Scott Fresina as Urban; Jim Wyatt as Cyrus; Don Cameron as Swuawk/Old Man #2	Short
13	"Lance & Zoopie: Squirly Town"	Doug TenNapel	December 20, 2009	A sly hyperactive squirrel takes his germaphobe straight-laced friend on an adventure to clear his aching head.	Stephen Root as Lance; Bobcat Goldthwait as Zoopie; Keone Young as Flashback Lance & Zoopie	Short
13	"Fanboy"	Eric Robles	December 20, 2009	Two kids in superhero costumes purchase their favorite drink and end up creating an ice monster.	David Hornsby as Fanboy; Nancy Cartwright as Chum-Chum; Don LaFontaine as Announcer; Jeff Bennett as Fanman, Lenny; Kevin Michael Richardson as The Ice Monster	TV series
13	"HandyCat: Bees-nees As Usual"	Russ Harris and G. Brian Reynolds	December 20, 2009	On their first day on the job, a handyman feline and his dog try to get rid of some pesky bees in hoping for a second job.	Rob Paulsen as Handycat/Drillbit; June Foray as Woman	Short

== The Meth Minute 39 (2007–2008) ==
The Meth Minute 39 had 39 original short cartoons and one bonus short, and was Frederator's fourth cartoon incubator. Production supervision was by series creator Fred Seibert, all individual cartoons were created by Dan Meth and produced by Carrie Miller, for exhibition on Channel Frederator. The shorts are listed in the order that they originally aired.

The spin-off series was "Nite Fite."

=== List of episodes ===
Episode	Title	Creator/Director	Air Date
1	Internet People	Dan Meth	September 5, 2007
2	Sex Machine	Dan Meth	September 28, 2007
3	Is Rush Heavy Metal? "Nite Fite"	Dan Meth	October 11, 2007
4	Dog Video Dating	Dan Meth	October 18, 2007
5	Mike Tyson's Brunch Out!!	Dan Meth	October 23, 2007
6	The Music Nerds	Dan Meth	November 1, 2007
7	Ultra and the Lazer Hearts	Dan Meth	November 8, 2007
8	Pink Floyd's Syd Barrett Visits His Accountant	Dan Meth	November 15, 2007
9	Beef and Stu in "PEZ Power"	Dan Meth	November 21, 2007
10	Cavalcade of Laffs	Dan Meth	November 29, 2007
11	Watermelon Nights	Dan Meth	December 4, 2007
12	The Craigs	Dan Meth	December 13, 2007
13	Seasons Greetings From The Meth Minute 39	Dan Meth	December 20, 2007
14	Beef & Stu in "Mustard Water"	Dan Meth	December 27, 2007
15	P-COK Hip Hop Video	Dan Meth	January 3, 2008
16	Sid and Nancy in "Hotel Heartbreak"	Dan Meth	January 10, 2008
17	Drinking & Drawing	Dan Meth	January 17, 2008
18	Foreign Cartoon About Hands	Dan Meth	January 23, 2008
19	Endless Poop in "Cavalcade of Laffs 2"	Dan Meth	January 30, 2008
20	Space Cowboy on Mars	Dan Meth	February 7, 2008
21	Rejected Kid-Show Ideas! Not For Kids!	Dan Meth	February 14, 2008
22	Bob Meets The Beatles	Dan Meth	February 20, 2008
23	The Music Nerds Do Karaoke	Dan Meth	February 28, 2008
24	Hollywood Stars in Japanese Commercials: Japandering	Dan Meth	March 6, 2008
25	Fake Reality Show: The Palms	Dan Meth	March 13, 2008
26	Space Cowboy on the Moon	Dan Meth	March 20, 2008
27	Wang Warriors	Dan Meth	March 27, 2008
28	The Craigs Phone It In	Dan Meth	April 3, 2008
29	XXXX	Dan Meth	April 10, 2008
30	Stu's Song	Dan Meth	April 17, 2008
31	Ultra & the Lazer Hearts: Throat Duel!	Dan Meth	April 24, 2008
32	Emomelon Days	Dan Meth	May 1, 2008
33	8-Bit	Dan Meth	May 8, 2008
34	Fan Fiction	Dan Meth	May 15, 2008
35	Viewer Calls	Dan Meth	May 22, 2008
36	Space Cowboy on Earth	Dan Meth	May 29, 2008
37	Company Picnic	Dan Meth	June 5, 2008
38	If The Meth Minute Never Ended: The Meth Minute 39 Thousand	Dan Meth	June 12, 2008
39	We Were the Meth Minute	Dan Meth	June 19, 2008
Bonus	Secrets of the Space Cowboy	Dan Meth	June 26, 2008
Bonus	The Stoic Squirrel in the Big City	Dan Meth	July 10, 2008

== Too Cool! Cartoons (2013–2014) ==
There were 11 Too Cool! Cartoons, Frederator Studios' fifth cartoon incubator, produced by Eric Homan and Kevin Kolde at Frederator Studios in Burbank. Exhibited at Cartoon Hangover. The shorts are listed in the order that they originally aired.

Spin-off series were Bee & PuppyCat and DeadEndia.

Episode	Title	Creator	Director	Air Date	Cast
101	Our New Electrical Morals	Mike Rosenthal	Kenny Pittenger	April 4, 2013	Fred Tatasciore, Johnny Hawkes, Audrey Wasilewski, Kari Wahlgren
102	Rocket Dog	Mel Roach	Mel Roach	May 2, 2013	Mel Roach, Josh Lawson, Steven Blum, Kari Wahlgren
103	Ace Discovery	Tom Gran & Martin Woolley	Tom Gran & Martin Woolley	May 30, 2013	Ako Mitchell, Hugo Harold-Harrison, Eric Meyers, Doireann Ní Chorragáin, Martin Woolley
104	Bee and PuppyCat: Part 1	Natasha Allegri	Larry Leichliter	July 11, 2013	Allyn Rachel, Kent Osborne, Tom Kenny
105	Bee and PuppyCat: Part 2	Natasha Allegri	Larry Leichliter	August 9, 2013	Allyn Rachel, Frank Gibson, Marina Sirtis
106	Doctor Lollipop	Kelly Martin	Aliki Grafft	September 12, 2013	Chris Diamantopoulos, Dee Baker, Rose McGowan, Jason Marsden, Travis Willingham
107	Dead End	Hamish Steele	Mel Roach	June 26, 2014	Zack Pearlman, Cameron Goodman, Stefan Marks, Maria Bamford
108	Chainsaw Richard	Christopher Reineman	Tom King	July 17, 2014	Tyler Merna, Ashly Burch, Eric Bauza, River Jordan
109	Manly	Jesse Moynihan & Justin Moynihan	Jesse Moynihan & Justin Moynihan	July 31, 2014	Jill Bartlett, Joey Richter, Steve Agee, Roger Craig Smith
110	SpaceBear	Andy Helms	Dave Ferguson	August 14, 2014	Rodger Bumpass, Christopher Curry, Ogie Banks, Josh Keaton
111	Blackford Manor	Jiwook Kim	Jiwook Kim	August 28, 2014	Ashly Burch, Martin Rayner, Billy West

== GO! Cartoons (2017–2018) ==
GO! Cartoons was Fred Seibert's sixth shorts creator and Frederator Studios' fifth, produced by Eric Homan and Kevin Kolde, in conjunction with Sony Pictures Animation. It will be Frederator's last incubator since Seibert resigned from Frederator and started FredFilms in February 2021. All 12 shorts were exhibited at Cartoon Hangover and Cartoon Hangover Select on Ellation's VRV subscription platform. The shorts are listed in the order that they originally aired.

No series spin-off series have been announced as of 2018.

No.	Title	Directed by	Created and Written by	Release date	Ref
1	"The Summoning"	Natasha Allegri	Elyse Castro	November 7, 2017	
Claire the witch needs troll fat for her brew, so she ends up going on an adventure with her cat Edgar.
2	"Boots"	Larry Huber	David Cowles & Alison Cowles	November 21, 2017	
Boots desires the chair discarded by her neighbor Chad, but does not want him to notice.
3	"City Dwellers"	Grant Kolton	Grant Kolton	December 5, 2017	
Dog walkers Bruce and Biff are asked by Nina to avoid certain areas since her dog Marty is a ninja. When they get distracted by a sandwich shop, Marty goes on the loose, and they have to retrieve him.
4	"Rachel and Her Grandfather Control the Island"	Jonni Peppers	Jonni Peppers	December 19, 2017	
Rachel and her grandfather want to take over the island by installing surveillance equipment robots out of their trash cans, but they first have to convince the president to get rid of the law banning trash cans.
5	"Nebulous"	Larry Huber	Brent Sievers	January 2, 2018	
A trio of space delivery folks stop by a grease planet for food.
6	"Welcome to Doozy"	Kathleen Good	Kate Tsang & Jennifer Suhr	January 16, 2018	
Ex tries to impress her work crush Skeletim with a bento, but when it gets enchanted by her friend Lou, it becomes an out-of-control monster.
7	"Both Brothers"	Larry Huber	Juris Lisovs	January 30, 2018	
Brothers Tod and Klod are upset that the snow park is closed because the weather is too nice, so they tell the sun to go away. However, when the sun does just that, it gets really cold and the crowd becomes angry. The two brothers try to apologize to the sun.
8	"The Bagheads: Get Trashed"	Michelle Bryan	D.R. Beitzel	February 13, 2018	
Paperbag-faced siblings Artemis and Elbow compete over who has to take out the trash using the rule that if their addition to the trash stack falls to the floor they lose.
9	"Tyler & Co."	Gabe Janisz	Gabe Janisz	February 27, 2018	
Tyler the Liger has enough box tops to become the Mayor of Cereal Town, but he needs to find a way out of the house that has been locked by its upside down door to mail them in.
10	"Kid Arthur"	Larry Huber	Joel Veitch & David Shute	March 13, 2018	
Arthur and his friend/arch-nemesis Mordred continue their battle while trying to do a test in school.
11	"Thrashin' USA"	Tom King	Rory Panagotopulos	March 27, 2018	
While on his way to the skate park, skater Pau gets trapped in his grumpy next door neighbor Mrs. Tracy's house and is force to do her skateboard arena of death by her.
12	"Pottyhorse"	Larry Huber	Damien Barchowsky & Jeff Drake	April 10, 2018	
Pottyhorse the town's sheriff and only toilet has to find a way to stop a poopsteorid from hitting the town.

== Frederator Digital's Mini-Series (2018) ==
Frederator Digital's Mini-Series are produced by Carrie Miller (executive produced by Fred Seibert) and exhibited on Cartoon Hangover Select on the VRV subscription platform.

== See also ==
- Fred Seibert cartoon shorts filmography
- List of Nickelodeon Animation Studio productions
- List of Cartoon Network Studios productions
