= List of animated feature films of 2029 =

This is a list of animated feature films scheduled for release in 2029.

== List ==
Title	Country	Director	Production company	Animation technique	Notes	Release date	Duration
Acorn's Adventure	Germany; Czech Republic	Filip Mašek	Pure Shore; Fabian&Fred	Computer		2029	80 minutes
Ballerina 2	France	Laurent Zeitoun	Gaumont; Good Hero	Computer		2029	
Captain Zero: The Movie	United States	Z Cher-Aimé; Andre Carl Engco	Cutting Edge Animation; One Ho Productions; Creative Cypher; Tatemen Entertainment	Traditional		Summer 2029	113 minutes
Coco 2	United States	Lee Unkrich	Disney; Pixar Animation Studios	Computer		November 21, 2029	
Dougie Dolittle	Germany	Sean Heuston; Alberto Rodriguez	Studio 100; Caligari Film; Telegael; 3 Doubles Producciones	Computer		2029	80 minutes
Emmi & Unipig	Germany	Stephan Wagner	Studio 100 Film; Carte blanche Media GmbH	Computer		2029	80 minutes
Heads	United Kingdom	Tiffany Kimmel	Happy Outlier Pictures; Mackinnon & Saunders; Nihil Declarandum	Stop-motion		2029	80 minutes
Untitled Illumination event film	United States	TBA	Universal Pictures; Illumination	Computer		June 29, 2029	
Karmic Knot	Latvia; United States; Germany	Signe Baumane	Studio Locomotive; The Marriage Project; Fabian&Fred	Mixed		2029	100 minutes
Untitled KPop Demon Hunters sequel	United States	Maggie Kang; Chris Appelhans	Netflix; Sony Pictures Animation	Computer		2029	
The Legend of Mountains and Seas: The Guardian of the Underworld	China	Hao Shen	Chaoran Qile Technology Co., Ltd. Damai Entertainment	TBA		2029	
Lucky Luke in Welcome to Fanga Town	France; Belgium	Bernard Campan; Célestine Plays	Pan Animation; Ellipse Animation; Belvision	Computer		2029	
Nirnama	Malaysia	Hilal Asyraf	WAU Animation	Computer		2029	
One Piece Film: BAAD	Japan	TBA	Toei Animation	Traditional		2029	
Pesta	Norway; Germany; France; United States	Hanne Berkaak	GKIDS; Knudsen Pictures; Studios Xilam; Charades; Mikrofilm	Traditional		2029	
Untitled Spin Master film	Canada	David Soren	Spin Master Entertainment	TBA		2029	
Sunny	Japan	Michael Arias	GKIDS; Dwarf Studios	Stop motion		2029	
Untitled third Super Mario film	United States	TBA	Universal Pictures; Illumination; Nintendo	Computer		Q1 2029	
Untitled Walt Disney Animation Studios film	United States	TBA	Disney; Walt Disney Animation Studios	Computer		June 15, 2029	
