= List of animated feature films of 2028 =

This is a list of animated feature films scheduled for release in 2028.

== List ==
Title	Country	Director	Production company	Animation technique	Notes	Release date	Duration
Baahubali: The Eternal War – Part 2	India	Ishan Shukla	Arka Media Works; Alcyde; Aniventure; Les Androids Associes; Mihira Visual Labs; Zaratan	Computer		TBA	
Bataille	France; Canada; Italy; Belgium	Vergine Keaton	Iliade et films Les Astronautes; Embuscade Films; Altara Films; Umedia	Traditional		TBA	80 minutes
Clay	United States	Fawn Veerasunthorn	Disney; Walt Disney Animation Studios	Computer		November 22, 2028	
Donkey	United States	Charlie Bean; Matt Flynn	Universal Pictures; Dreamworks Animation	Computer		June 30, 2028	
Dragoons	Canada	Shea Wageman	ICON Creative Studio	Computer		TBA	
Dreamers – The Hunt for Shadowclaw	Germany; Canada	Christopher Jenkins	Kickstart Entertainment; Epsilon Film	Computer		Q4 2028	85 minutes
Dynamic Duo	United States	Arthur Mintz	Warner Bros. Pictures; Warner Bros. Pictures Animation; DC Studios; Swaybox Studios; 6th & Idaho	Digital puppetry		September 22, 2028	
Fairyheart	Hungary; Canada; Germany	Anita Doron	Odin's Eye Entertainment; Mythberg Films; Storyteller Pictures; Lakeside Animation; Traumhaus Studios	Computer		Q1 2028	
Freddy the 13th	United States	Dan Trachtenberg; Yehudi Mercado	Paramount Animation	TBA		October 13, 2028	
Ghost Market	United States	Trevor Jimenez; Jesse Andrews	Disney; Pixar Animation Studios	Computer		March 10, 2028	
Godslap	United States	Kellan Stover	Powerhouse Animation Studios; Lyrical Animation; Meatier Productions	Traditional		TBA	
Halloween vs Day of the Dead	Mexico; Germany	Celso García	Studio 100 Film; Lunch Films	Computer		Q3 2028	80 minutes
Untitled Hello Kitty film	United States	David Derrick Jr. John Aoshima	Warner Bros. Pictures; Warner Bros. Pictures Animation; New Line Cinema	TBA		July 21, 2028	
Honor of Kings	China	Zhang Chiyu	Tencent Games; TiMi Studio Group; Mahua Fun Age	Computer		TBA	
Untitled Illumination / Nintendo film	United States	TBA	Universal Pictures; Illumination; Nintendo	Computer		April 12, 2028	
Incredibles 3	United States	Peter Sohn	Disney; Pixar Animation Studios	Computer		June 16, 2028	
Insectario	Mexico; Spain; Canada	Sofía Carrillo	Inicia Films; Pimienta Films; Productions Ocho	Stop-motion		TBA	85 minutes
Into the Mortal World 2	China	TBA	WinSing Animation	Computer		TBA	
Kindred Spirits	France; Ireland	Tomm Moore	Cartoon Saloon; Folivari	Traditional		TBA	
Lilo & Stitch 2	United States	TBA	Walt Disney Pictures; Rideback	Live-action animation		May 26, 2028	
Limbo	Latvia	Gints Zilbalodis	Dream Well Studio	Computer		June 2, 2028	
The Lunar Chronicles	United Kingdom; United States	Noëlle Raffaele	Warner Bros. Pictures; Warner Bros. Pictures Animation; Locksmith Animation	Computer		November 3, 2028	
Masha and the Bear Movie	Russia	Oleg Kuzovkov	Studio MiM	Computer		TBA	
Mission Granny	United Kingdom	Toni Weiss	Global Constellation; Samsara Filmproduktion; White Spot Films	Computer		TBA	
My President	South Korea	TBA	Greenwood	Traditional		May 23, 2028	90 minutes
Oh, the Places You'll Go!	United States	Jon M. Chu; Jill Culton	Warner Bros. Pictures; Warner Bros. Pictures Animation; Bad Robot; Dr. Seuss Enterprises	Computer		March 17, 2028	
Pet Robots	United States	Scott Christian Sava; Dean Lorey	BlueDream Studios	Computer		TBA	
Untitled third Pocoyo film	Spain	TBA	Animaj	Computer		TBA	
Scissor Seven: The Movie	China	Xiaofeng He	Aha Entertainment; Sharefun Studio	Traditional		TBA	
Untitled Sonic the Hedgehog spin-off film	United States	Jeff Fowler	Paramount Pictures; Original Film; Sega; Sega Sammy Group	Computer; Live-action		December 22, 2028	
Sword Art Online the Movie: Integral Domain	Japan	Shingo Adachi	A-1 Pictures; Psyde Kick Studio	Traditional		TBA	
Untitled Teenage Mutant Ninja Turtles film	United States	TBA	Paramount Pictures; Nickelodeon Movies; Original Film	Computer; Live-action		November 17, 2028	
Tistou	France; Belgium	Amandine Taffin	Pink Parrot Media; Walking the Dog	Computer		TBA	85 minutes
The Twilight World	Germany; Denmark; France; United States	Werner Herzog	Sun Creature Studio; Psyop	Traditional		TBA	
The White Rajah of Sarawak	Malaysia	Siew Chung Lee	Motion Foundry	Traditional		July 22, 2028	
Winner	Spain; India	Jaime Maestro	Pink Parrot Media; Paratha Entertainment; Rafa Nadal Foundation; Grangel Studio; La Tribu Animation; Amuse Animation; Digitoonz	Computer		TBA	
Yes Chef!	France; Belgium	Annie Carrel; Benjamin Mousquet	Studio TF1; Octopolis nWave Pictures; Blue Spirit Animation	Computer		TBA	
