= Liu Sanjie =

Legendary Chinese folk music singer

- Born: During the Song dynasty Guangxi
- Other names: Liu Sanmei; Liu Sanhua
- Occupation: Folk music singer

Chinese name
- Traditional Chinese: 劉三姐
- Simplified Chinese: 刘三姐
Transcriptions
Standard Mandarin
- Hanyu Pinyin: Liú Sānjiě
- Wade–Giles: Liu San-chieh

Liu Sanjie (Chinese: 刘三姐) was a Chinese folk music singer, who is the Liu family's third daughter, with an original name of Liu Shanhua. Liu is a legendary figure of Zhuang people in Guangxi and her songs were melodious and touching, therefore she was dubbed as the "Goddess of Singing". The earliest story about her can be found in the Southern Song Dynasty (1127-1279). Many legends and folk songs about her were created starting in the Ming (1368-1644) and Qing (1644-1911) dynasties. Liu Sanjie is said in one version to be a commoner girl born in 703 in Zhuang. She was said to be a wunderkind, able to compose impromptu songs at will. Her songs were touching and sonorous, so she was called the Song Fairy. She subsequently taught singing in the surrounding areas. Many people have come to compete with her in singing. Her talent, however, attracted jealousy from the local hoodlums, which resulted in her early death. The evil farmer Mo Huairen was said to make Liu Sanjie his slave girl and bribed officials to oppress her when she refused to do so. Despite various versions of Liu Sanjie's tales, for hundreds of years, Zhuang people have maintained their adoration for her.

== Life and legend ==
Liu Sanjie was born in a farmer's family in Yangshuo County, Guilin during the Song Dynasty. When she was young, she lost her parents and was educated by her elder brother. After she grew up, she was oppressed by the landlord. When Liu Sanjie was three years old, she was found as having a melodious voice, and after she was a teenage girl, she was considered the top folk song singer, especially among the Zhuang People in South China. Liu Sanjie used to sing songs on a fishing boat on a green river of her hometown. During her youth period of time, she managed to escape from Mo Huairen, who wanted Liu to be his concubine. As they sang, Liu and her lover traveled and eventually found their freedom. Turning into a pair of larks. When Liu traveled, she experienced many difficulties and challenges. Influenced by these challenges, Liu could eventually include inspiring emotion and feeling in her song. As a result, Yizhou Town people still manage some of Liu's relics today, the spot where Liu used to do her laundry and a site where Liu used to hold dramatic song contest.

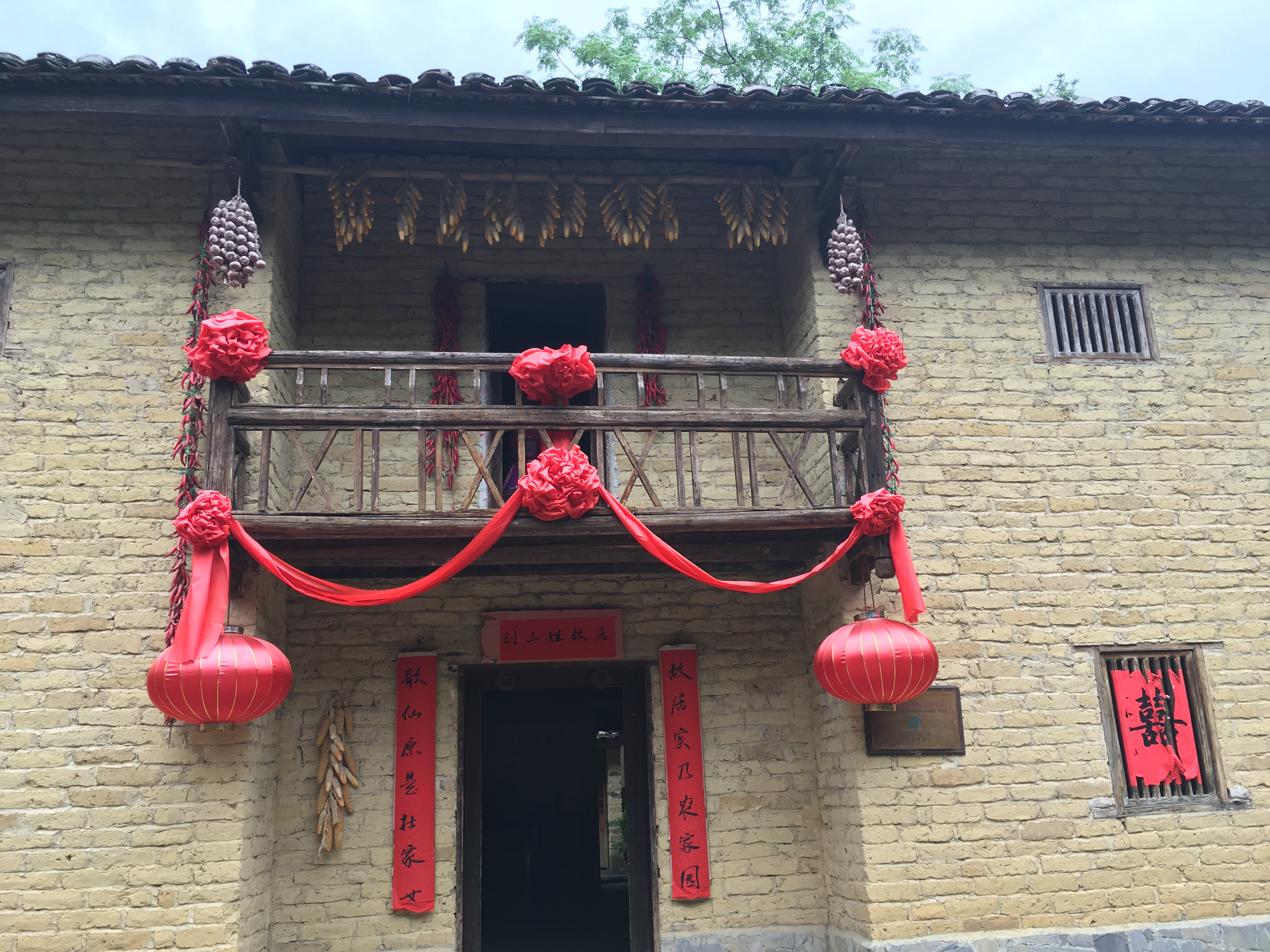
Reconstructed building at Liu Sanjie Park

According to legend, Landlord Mo Huairen (莫怀仁) tried many ways to defeat Liu: He tried to force Liu to be his concubine (and failed), then prohibited the poor from singing and invited three scholars to beat Liu at a singing competition (and failed). Enraged, Mo decided to just kill her. Villagers helped Liu and her brother flee to Liuzhou city, but Liu still would not give up singing, and her songs inspired people to sing with her in defiance of Mo. To keep the villagers from being killed on her behalf, Liu jumped into Lake Xiaolongtan, but the moment she hit the water, a huge golden carp jumped out and carried Liu to the heavens where she became an immortal. Villagers then passed down her songs through the generations.

== Folk song style ==
Liu Sanjie is known for her talent for singing to celebrate her liberty and honesty, as well as criticizing those abuses and injustice in her songs. The various cultural contexts result in the loss of esthetic significance in Liu Sanjie's ballads ' cross-ethnic and cross-lingual transmission. The difference in local aesthetic knowledge also causes difficulties in spreading the ballads of Liu Sanjie. By integrating Zhuang and Han cultures, the cross-ethnic transmission of Liu Sanjie's ballads has been realized. The ballads of Liu Sanjie emphasize rhythm, singing method and unity of voice and emotion, and show the unique regional style of music and national aesthetic connotation. These three aspects are its main features, as well as the important reasons for Liu Sanjie's moving and classical spread.

As a result, Liu is considered as having developed an inspiring and revolutionized folk song style. Liu became a popular Chinese folk song singer during the 1960s when socialist China was about to be developed. Therefore, Liu was influenced by macro-social development and tried to manifest her patriotism in her song lyrics. Regardless, the absence of clear and systematic classification of intellectual in socialist China made Liu's music talent ignored by the public. In addition to manifesting patriotism, Liu also included some culture-related phenomenon or issues in her songs.

Liu Sanjie is treated as an example of a real-life scenery performance artist in that she catered to audiences' emotional needs and helped those Chinese peasants to speak out their voice. Liu's performance song style has attracted many foreign and domestic tourists to the hometown of Liu, making her folk song style become a kind of cultural heritage in southern part of China. Liu has developed her own traditional folk song style, which is treated as constituting several elements, including gamut scales, notations and other terminologies of musicological system. Liu's songs could be sung by people when having an ordinary conversation or quarreling with a family member. What Liu followed was also treated as a narrative long song style and life song style. This was mainly because when singing songs, Liu followed some established rules and etiquette. Through songs created by Liu, others can explicitly find out the development of folk song style of hers. It has significant implications for higher education reform of music education.

== Impression Liu Sanjie ==
Impression Liu Sanjie was staged on March 20, 2004 by director Zhang Yimou in Yangshuo with more than 600 participants and is a local tourist attraction. That is the world's biggest natural auditorium that uses Li River waters as its stage, with its backdrop to be twelve mist-enveloped hills. Impression Liu Sanjie is divided into seven scenes. The light show lasts 70-minute on a nature stage along with the Li River, performers wear traditional attire from the Zhuang, Miao, and Yao minorities, which showcasing numerous light-emitting diodes.

Impression Liu Sanjie

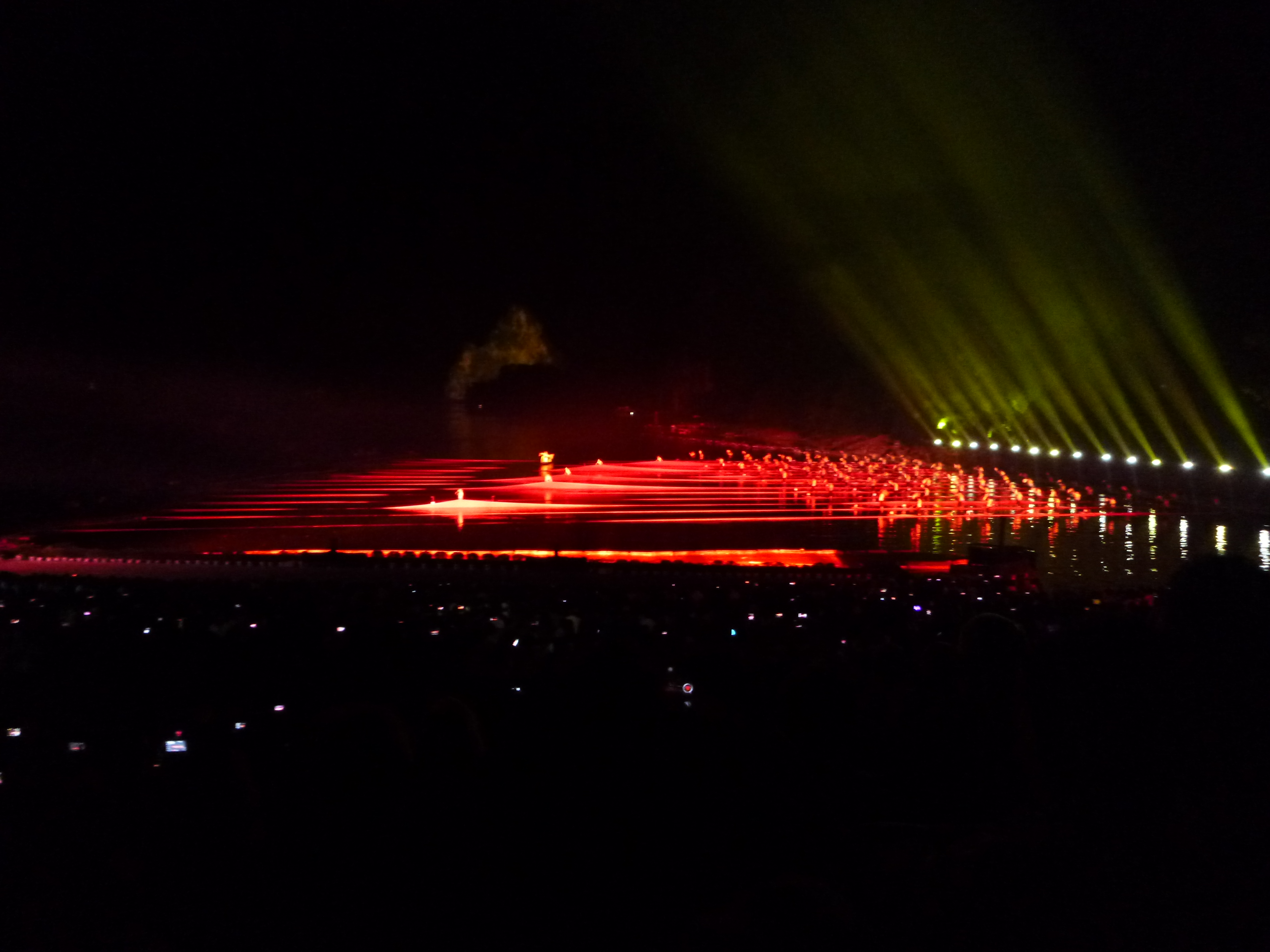

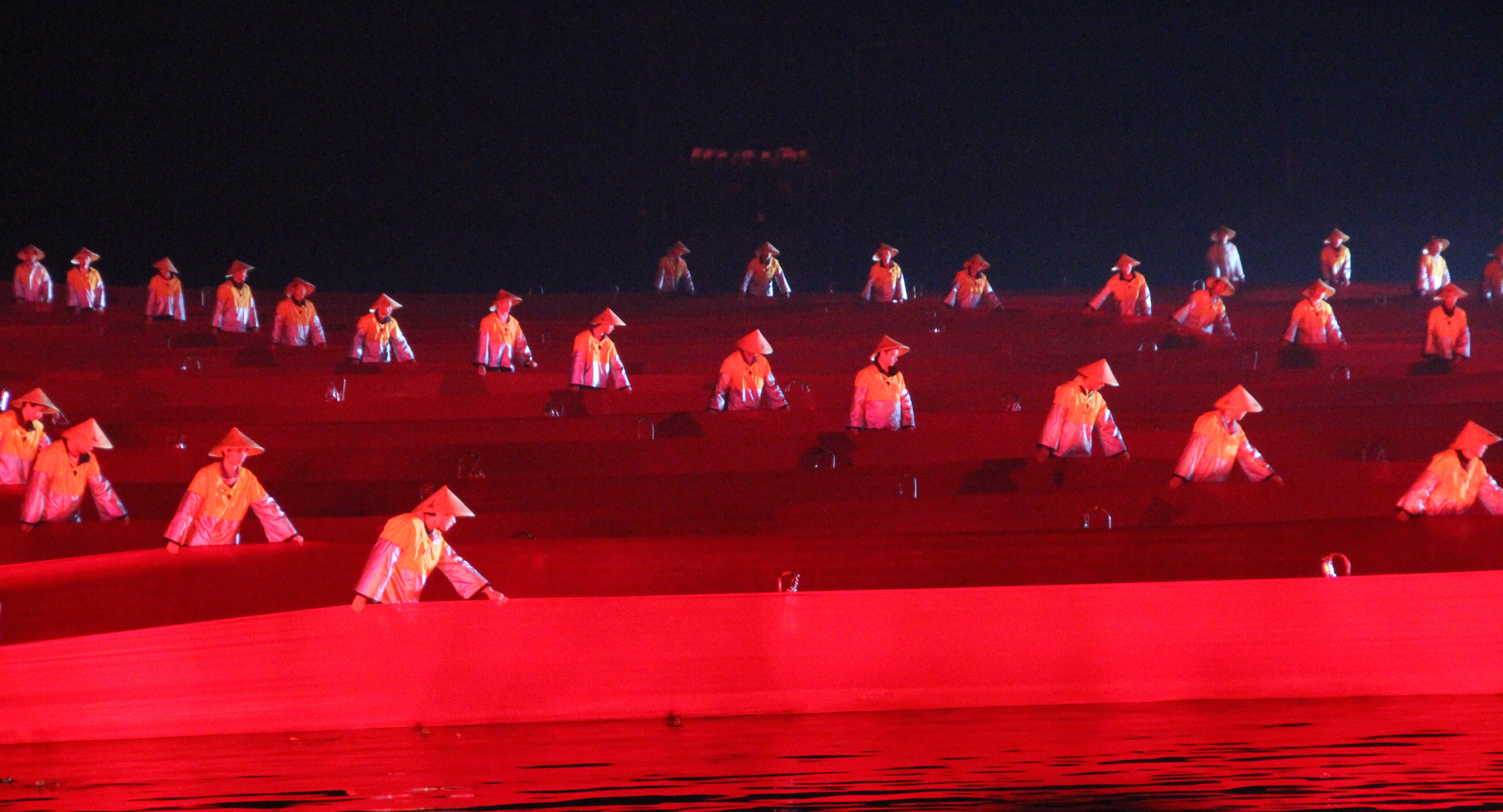

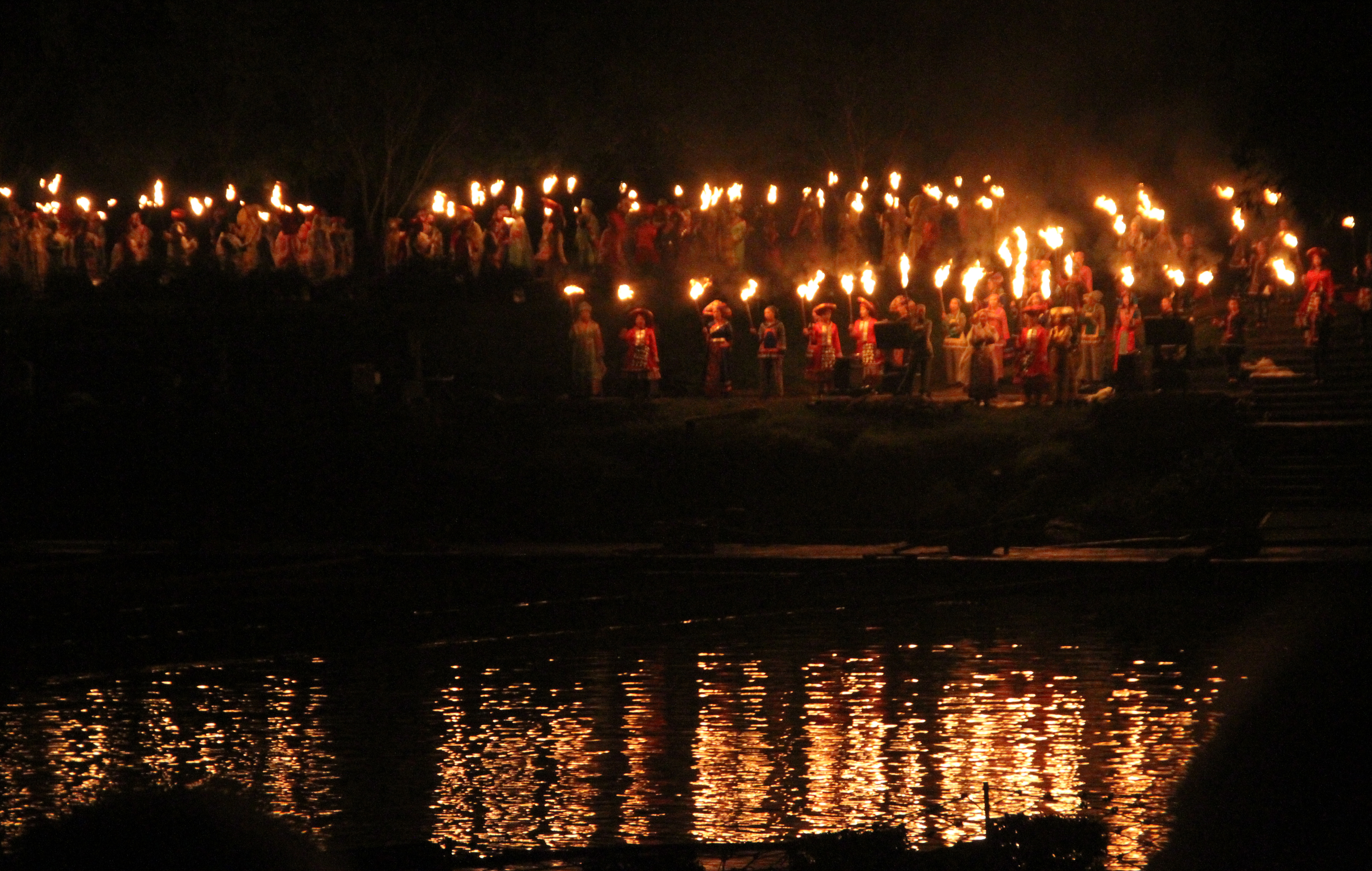

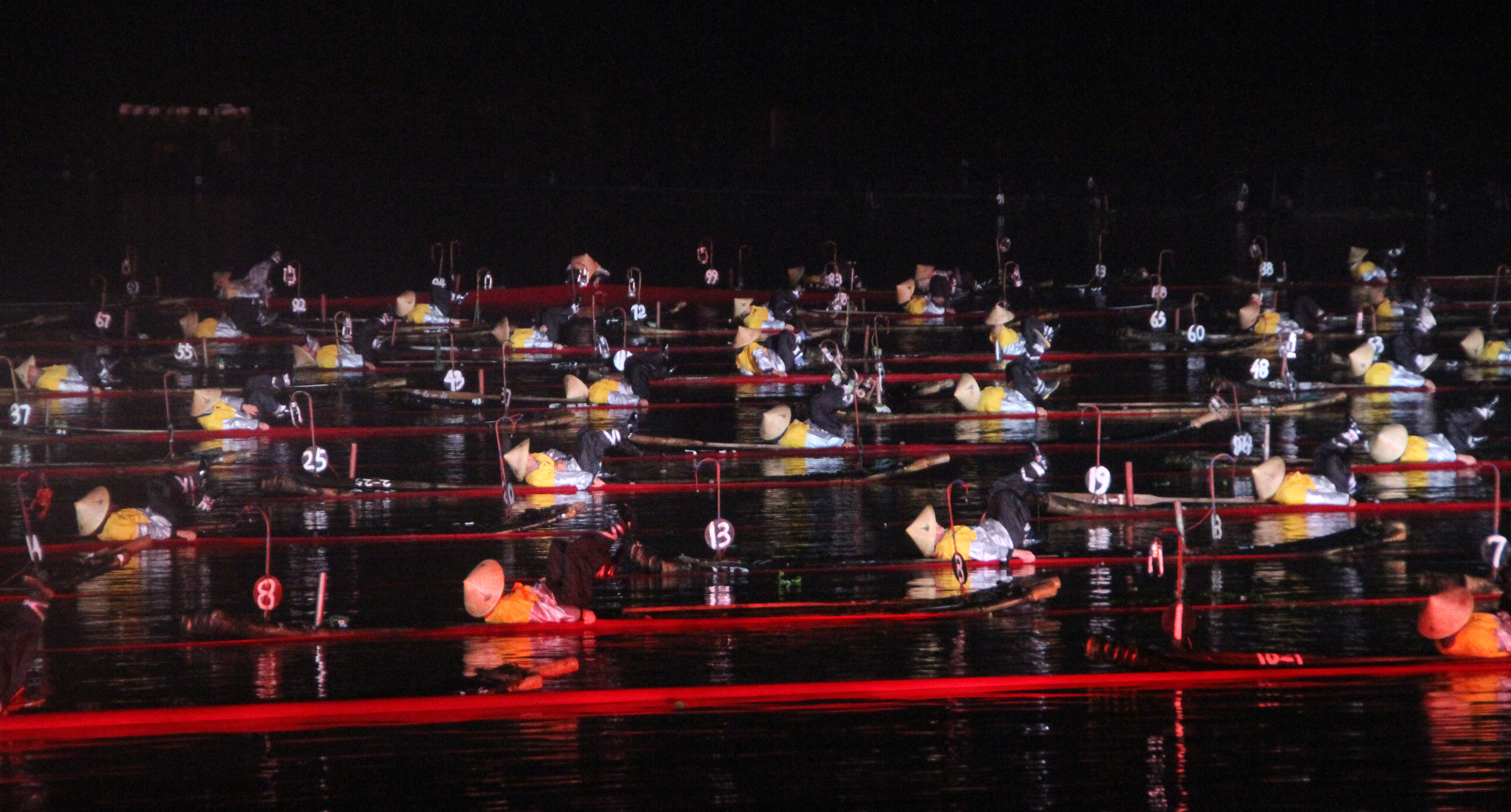

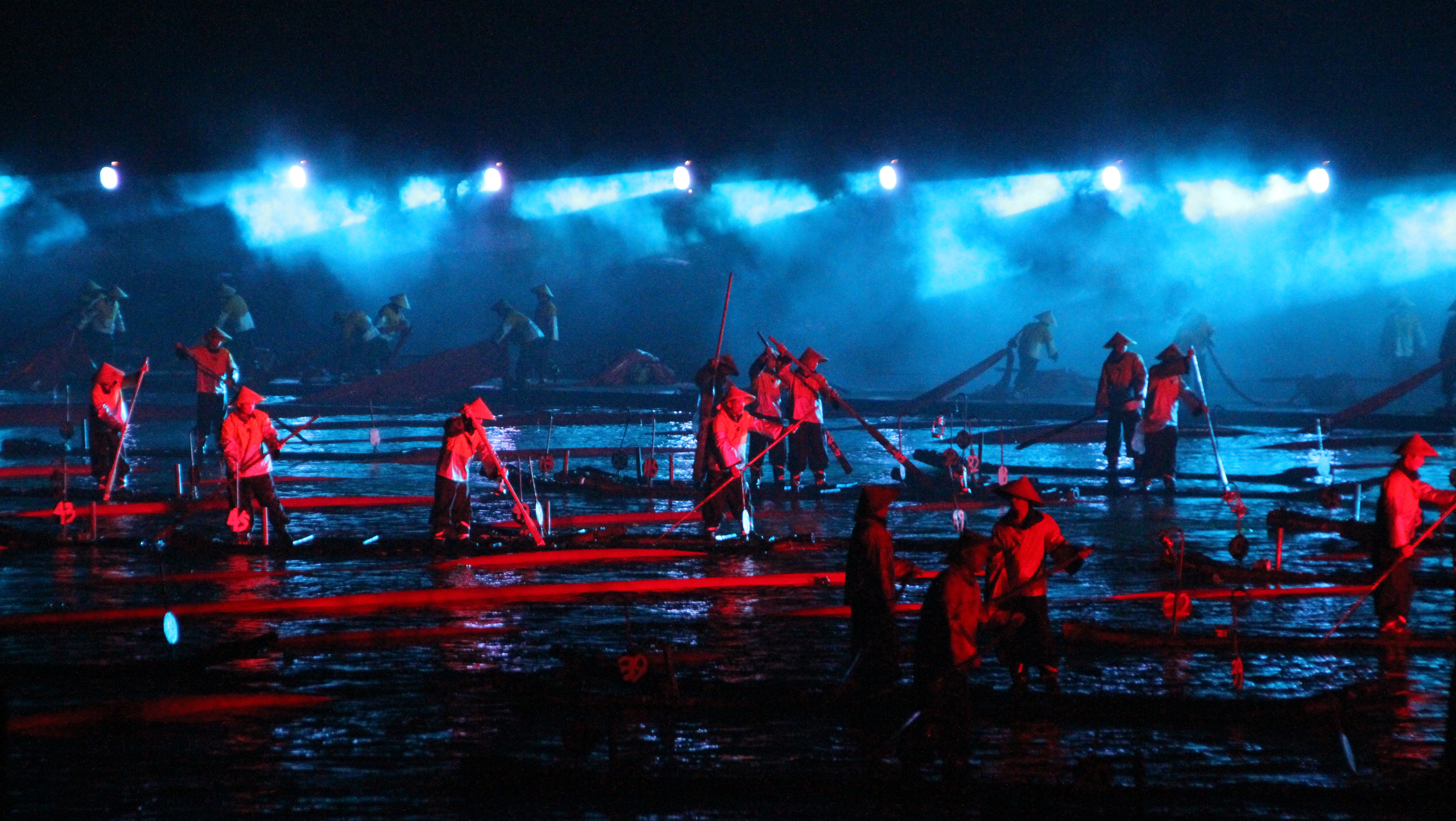

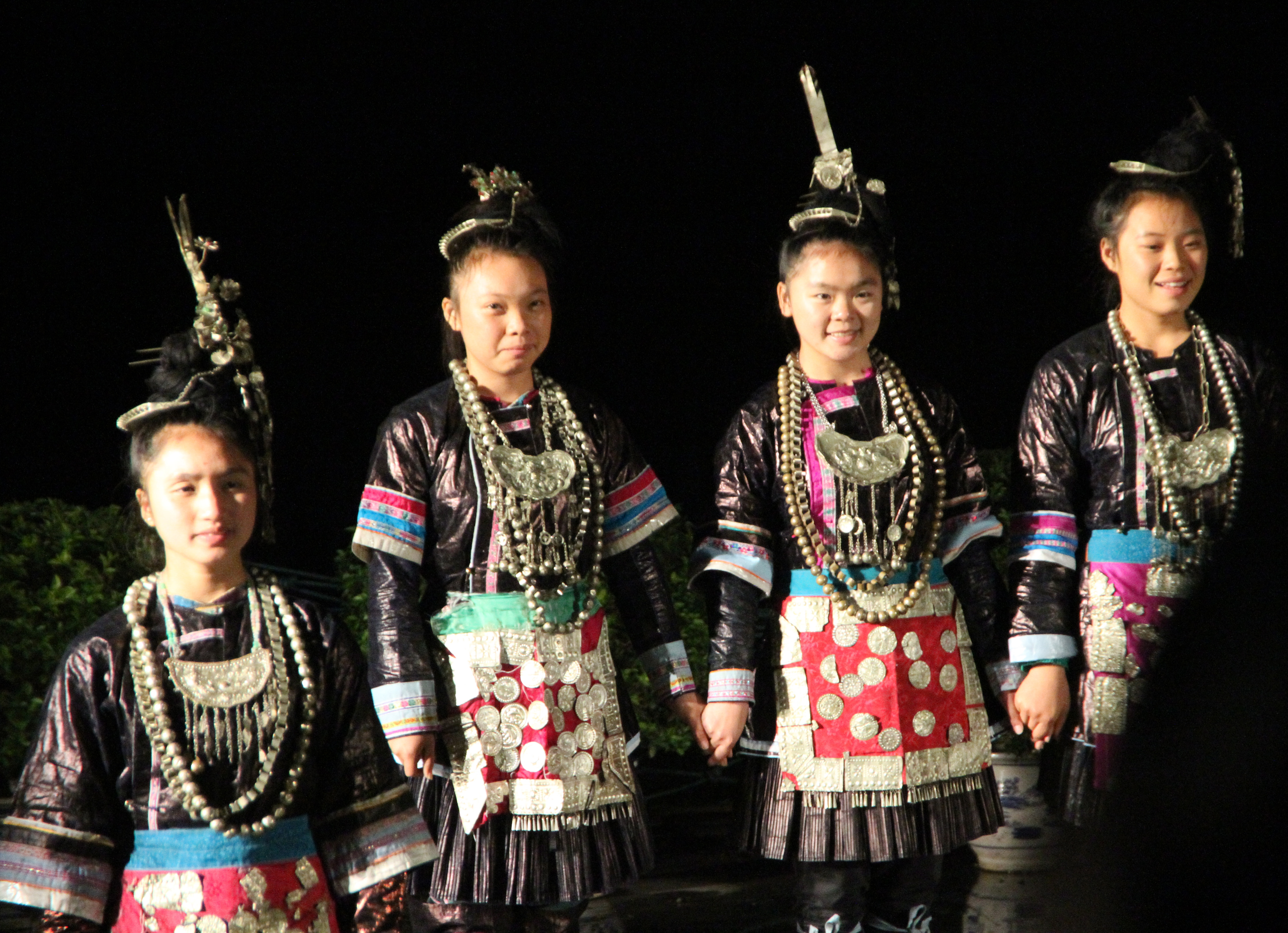

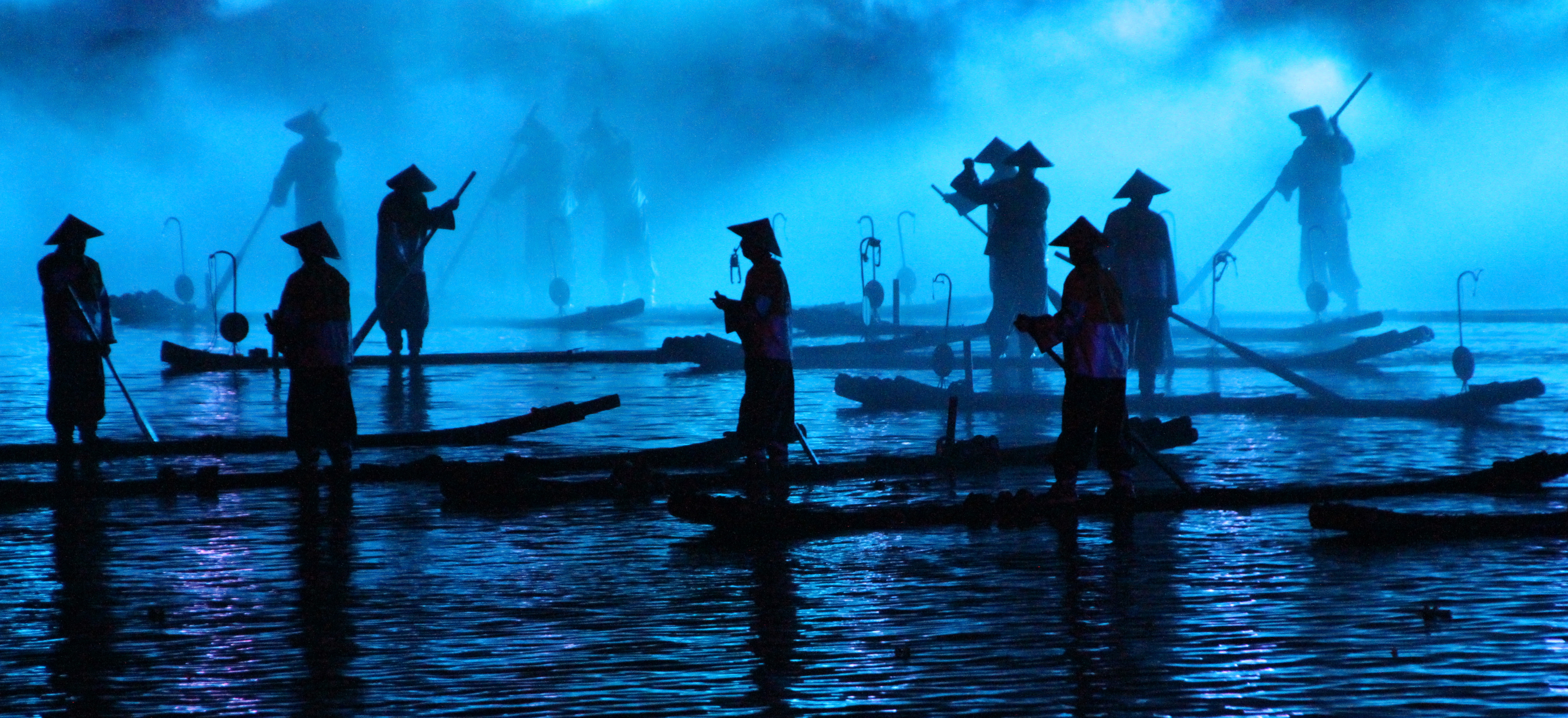

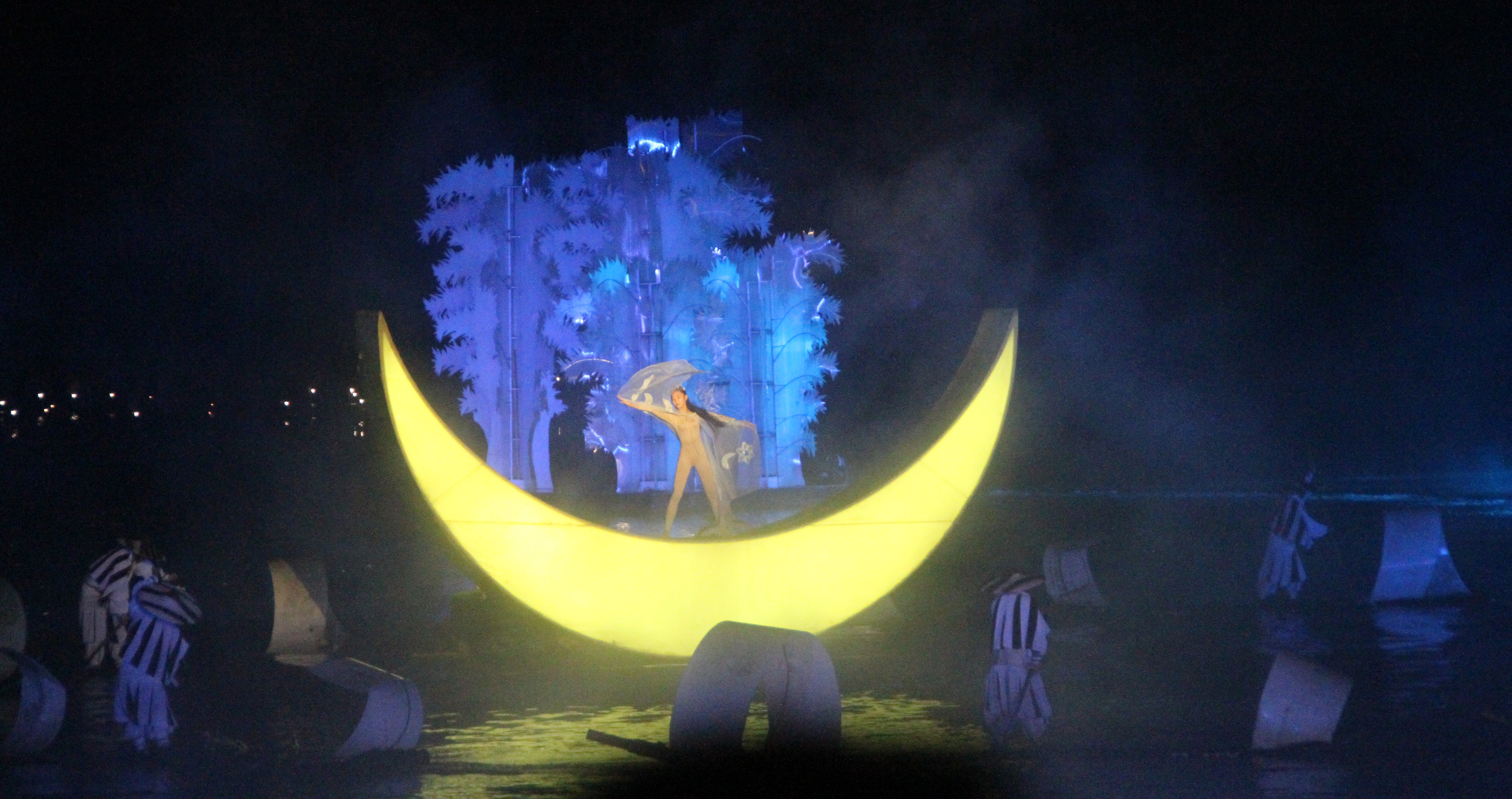

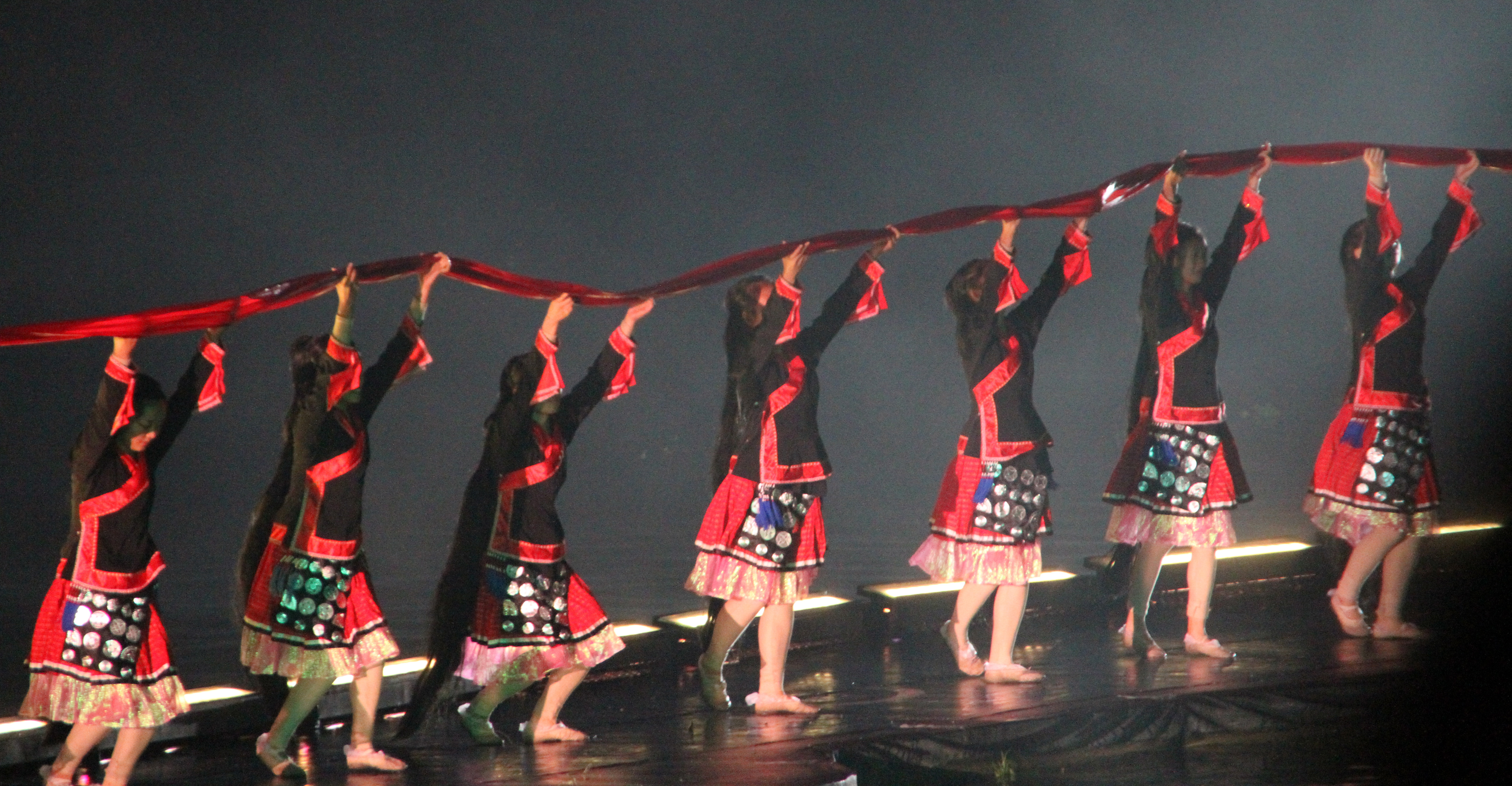

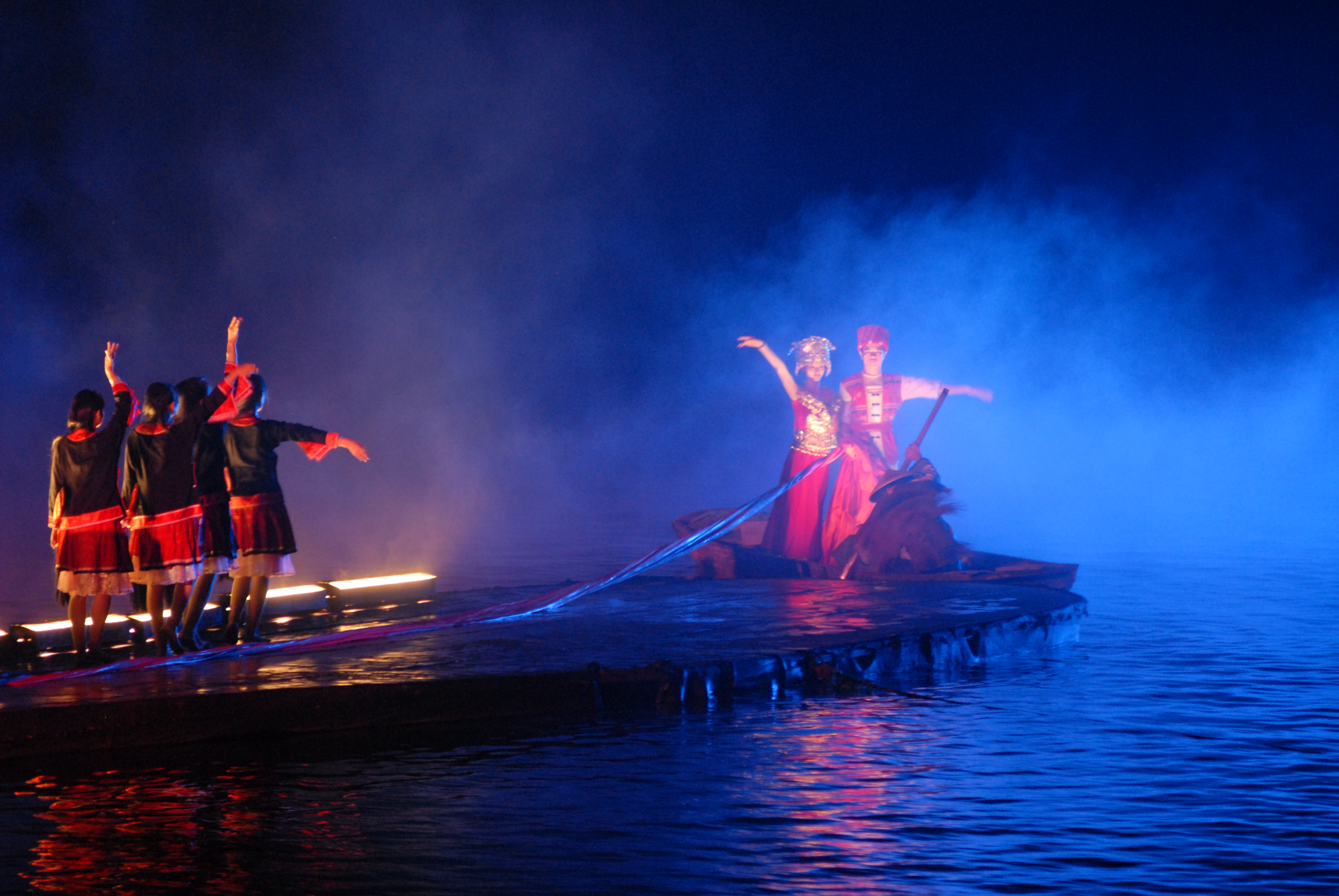

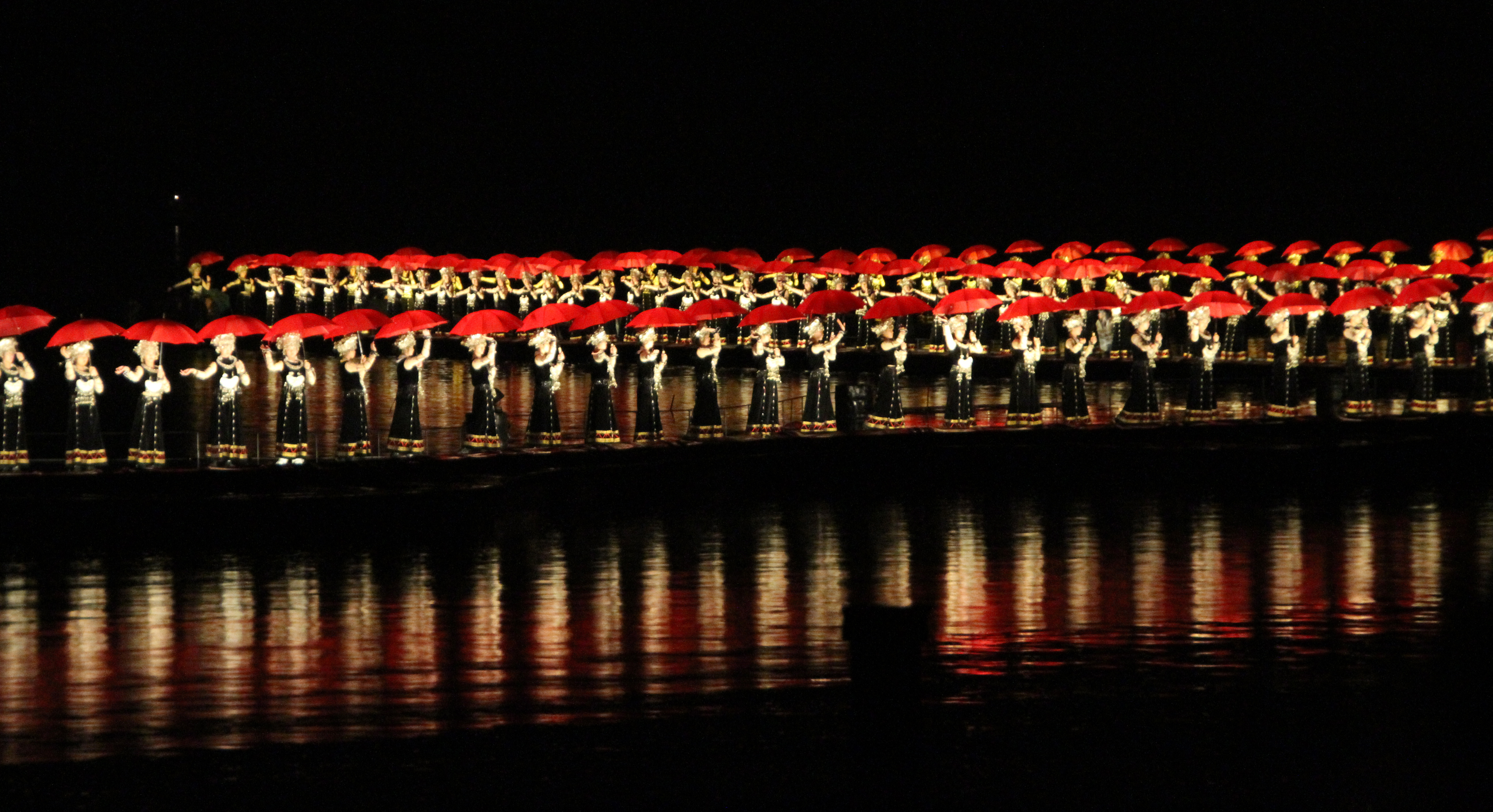

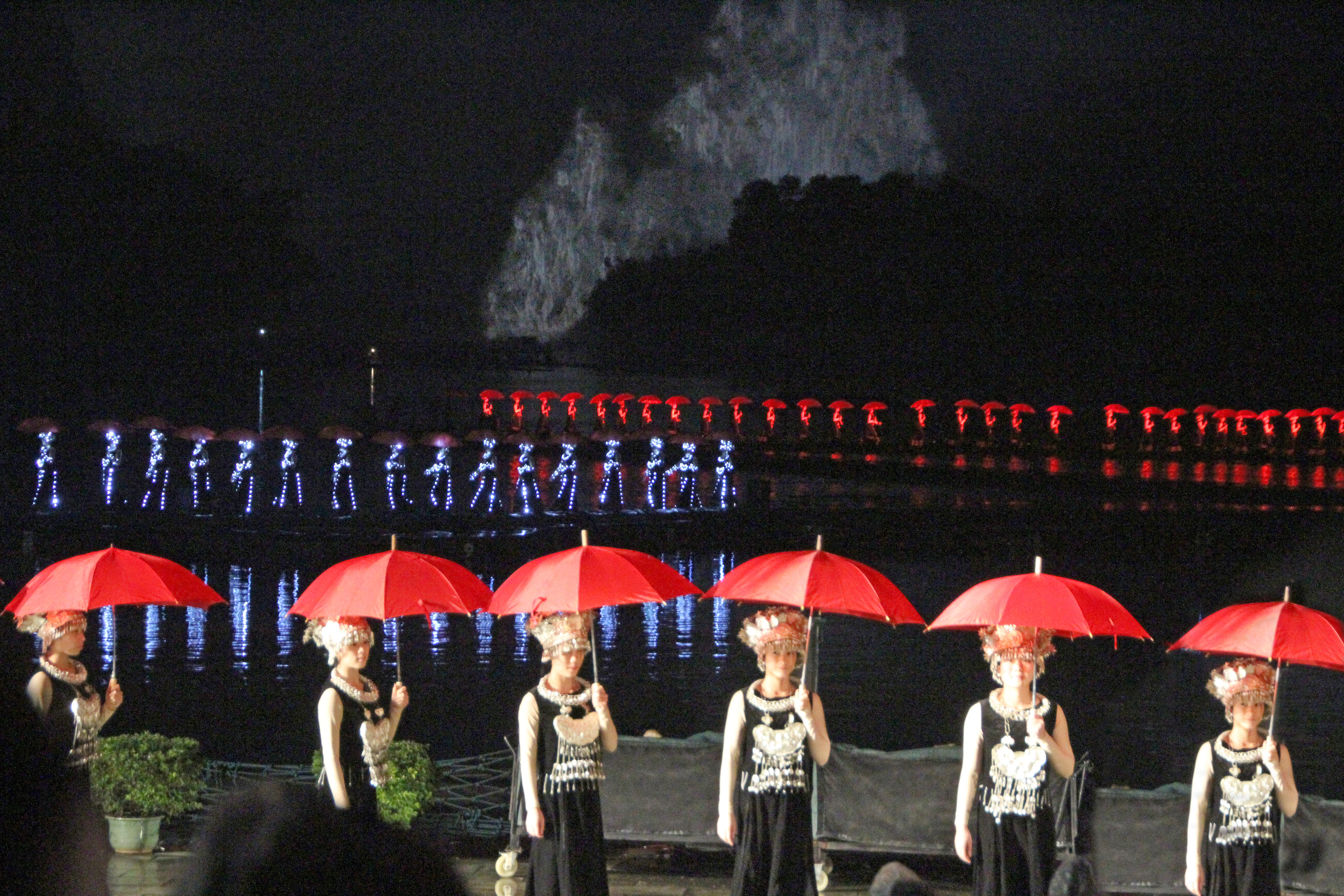

== Impact ==
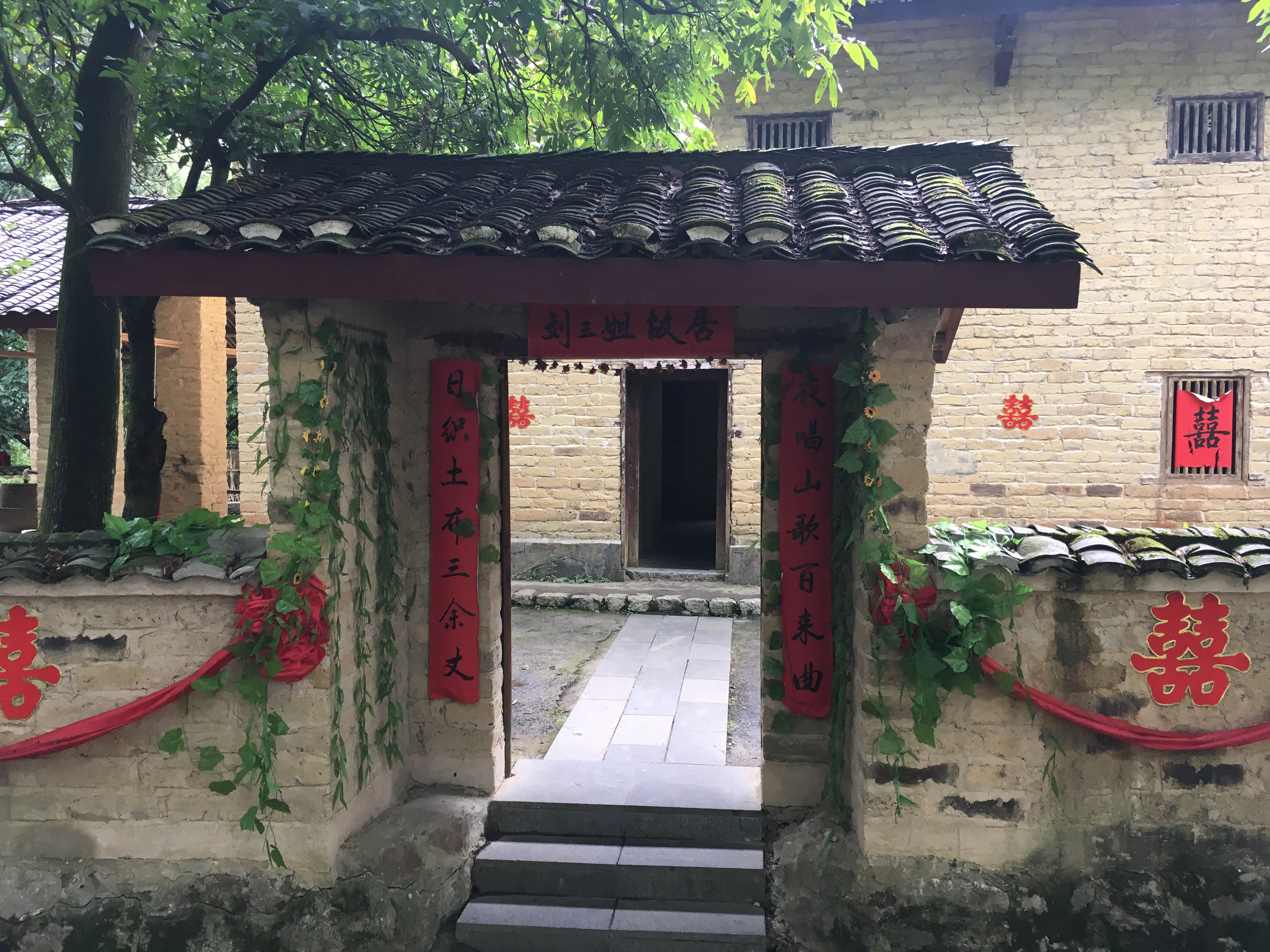
Entrance door at Liu Sanjie Park reconstructed building

Liu Sanjie was able to generate substantial impacts on society because of the patriotism and expressive emotions in Liu's songs. Liu's singing style was also affected by the inflow and popularity of Western music in Chinese society. After the defeats of the 1894-1895 the First Sino-Japanese War and the 1900 Boxer Rebellion, Chinese people began to believe that only though initiating and participating in the Self-Strengthening Movement, can they strength the Chinese nation profoundly. Under such circumstance, the establishment of a new kind of national music allows large groups of people to participate in and create a sense of solidarity spirit. In Liu Sanjie's songs, she also utilized this kind of solidarity intention to stimulate the general audiences' desire to unite as one and protect their nations by fighting against the external enemies boldly.

Liu Sanjie's ballad is the source and important carrier of folk pedagogy of the Zhuang nationality. It carries rich cultural resources and contains a rich national spirit and humanistic spirit. Liu Sanjie is the representative of the image of minority women in Guangxi. Liu Sanjie's Chinese folk songs bring women of all ethnic groups into society, the spirit inspires the healthy growth of women of all ethnic groups in later generations. In recent years, many scenic spots have emerged with Liu Sanjie as the core, her hometown, Guangxi and ethnic minorities regard Liu Sanjie as a competitive symbol.

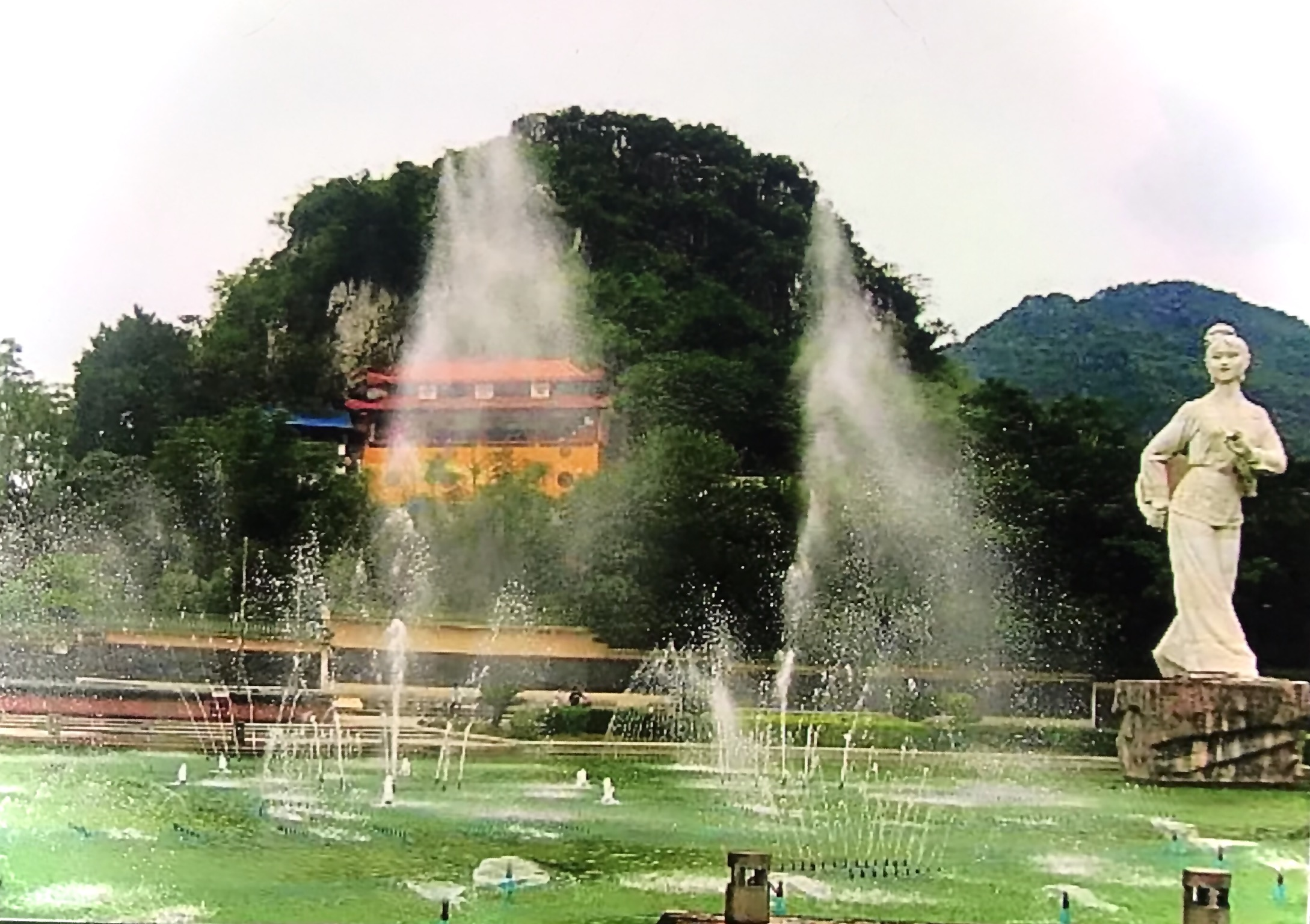
Memorial statue of Liu Sanjie

Liu Sanjie's song's style was also affected by the Cultural Revolution conducted by Chinese politicians during 1966 and 1976. During this period, the political thoughts were dominated by the oppression of those literate in Chinese society. It was during the Chinese Cultural Revolution period of time when Liu's revolutionary songs and performance were terminated. To some extent, Liu's songs and performance shifted to civil-wide cultural movements in mainland China during this period of time. Liu's song and performance style had to present an implicit expression style and provided revolutionary implications for audiences. Later on, affected by China's opening and reform policy implemented in 1978, the culture of Liu Sanjie entered a prosperous development period as well. Gradually, Liu's performance style was known by national audiences. Liu's songs and performance style have become symbols of traditional Chinese cultural heritage. It has also attracted many audiences' attention and meets their appreciation needs in South East countries, both the revolutionary and patriotism spirits are considered as representatives of Chinese culture.
