= List of Chinese animated films =

This is a list of Chinese animated films, sorted by year.

== Films by decade ==
=== 1920s ===
English name	Year	Chinese name
Shuzhendong Chinese Typewriter	1922	舒振東華文打字機
Dog Treat	1924	狗請客
New Year	1924	過年

=== 1930s ===
English name	Year	Chinese name
The Camel's Dance	1935	駱駝獻舞

=== 1940s ===
English name	Year	Chinese name
Princess Iron Fan	1941	鐵扇公主
Emperor's Dream	1947	皇帝夢
Go After an Easy Prey, a.k.a. Turtle Caught in a Jar	1948	甕中捉鱉

=== 1950s ===
English name	Year	Chinese name
	1952	小貓釣魚
Little Hero	1953	小小英雄
Good Friends	1954	好朋友
Magic Brush, a.k.a. Magical Pen	1954, 1955	神筆
The Dream of Xiao Mei	1954	小梅的夢
The Proud General, a.k.a. The Conceited General	1956	驕傲的將軍
Why is the Crow Black-Coated	1956	烏鴉為甚麼是黑的
Witty Goat	1956	機智的山羊
Cross Monkey Hill	1958	過猴山
	1958	小鯉魚跳龍門
	1958	木頭姑娘
Pigsy Eats Watermelon	1958	豬八戒吃西瓜
Chuang Tapestry, a.k.a. Chwang Tapestry	1959	一幅僮錦
Fishing Child, a.k.a. Fisher Boy	1959	漁童
The Radish Comes Back	1959	蘿蔔回來了
	1959	蜜蜂與蚯蚓
Cricket Fighting by Ji Gong	1959	濟公鬥蟋蟀
Inscription of Dragons	1959	彫龍記

=== 1960s ===
English name	Year	Chinese name
A Clever Duckling	1960	聰明的鴨子
Little Tadpole Looks for Mamma	1960	小蝌蚪找媽媽
	1960	小燕子
Havoc in Heaven, a.k.a. Uproar in Heaven	1961, 1964	大鬧天宮
Ginseng Baby	1961	人蔘娃娃
	1961	誰的本領大
	1962	絲腰帶
	1962	等明天
	1962	小溪流
Scatterbrain and Crosspath, a.k.a. Scatterbrain and Crosspatch	1962	沒頭腦和不高興
Peacock Princess	1963	孔雀公主
Golden Conch	1963	金色的海螺
The Cowherd's Flute, a.k.a. The Buffalo Boy and his Flute	1963	牧笛
	1963	半夜雞叫
Deer Girl	1963	鹿女
	1964	差不多
	1964	湖上歌舞
	1964	紅軍橋
Campo Hero Sister	1965	草原英雄小姐妹
	1965	我們愛農村
	1965	畫像

=== 1970s ===
English name	Year	Chinese name
After School	1972	放學以後
Little 8th Route Army	1973	小八路
Little Sentinel of East China Sea	1973	東海小哨兵
Little Trumpeter	1973	小號手
The Story of a Big Oar	1975	大櫓的故事
The Ferry	1975	渡口
Shi Hang	1976	試航
The Golden Wild Goose	1976	金色的大雁
The Bamboo Shoot Growing in the House	1976	長在屋裡的竹筍
One Night in an Art Gallery	1978	画廊一夜
The Fox and the Hunter, a.k.a. The Hunter Hunted	1978	狐狸打獵人
Two Little Peacocks	1978	兩隻小孔雀
Watermelon Cannons	1978	西瓜炮
A Foolish Man Buys Shoes	1979	愚人買鞋
A Hedgehog Carries Watermelon	1979	刺猬背西瓜
The Talented Acrobat	1979	天才杂技演员
Nezha Conquers the Dragon King, a.k.a. Nezha Fights the Sea	1979	哪吒鬧海
Who Meowed?	1979	喵嗚是誰叫的？
Cat Mimi	1979	好貓咪咪
The Hens' Relocation to a New Home	1979	母雞搬家

=== 1980s ===
English name	Year	Chinese name
Colour Old Master Q	1981	老夫子
Old Master Q Water Tiger	1982	老夫子水虎傳
Fox and the Bear	1983	
Old Master Q	1983	老夫子
Passing the Bridge	1983	過橋
The Butterfly Spring	1983	蝴蝶泉
Monkey King Conquers the Demon, a.k.a. The Monkey King and the Skeleton Ghost	1984 - 1985	金猴降妖
	1987	不怕冷的大衣
	1989	獨木橋

=== 1990s ===
English name	Year	Chinese name
Goose: the video	1991	雁陣
Music Island	1992	
	1992	狐狸分餅
Pistachio Nuts	1993	開心果
Kid Monkey and Kid Pigsy	1994	
	1994	珍珠泉
Cyber Weapon Z	1995	超神Z
Little Heroes, a.k.a. Young Heroes	1995 - 1996	自古英雄出少年
	1996	神馬與腰刀
Sun Moon Lake	1996	日月潭
Little God of Confusion	1997	
	1997	神笛
	1997	妖樹與松鼠
A Chinese Ghost Story: The Tsui Hark Animation, a.k.a. Xiao Qian	1997	小倩
Kerabans phantastische Reise, a.k.a. Kerabans Fantastic Journey	1997	
Dragon Guardian	1998	
Korla Pear	1998	庫爾勒香梨
Reise um die Erde in 80 Tagen, a.k.a. Around the World in 80 days	1998	八十天環遊地球
The Girl and The Monster	1998	潑水節
Toys Family	1998	
Torch Festival	1998	火把節
	1998	紅石峰
Animated Karoke	1999, 2000, 2002	
Lotus Lantern	1999	寶蓮燈
Reise zum Mond, Die	1999	
Trip on the Moon	1999	登月之旅
	1999	熊貓小貝

=== 2000s ===
English name	Year	Chinese name
Magic Umbrella	2000	可可的魔傘
Music Boat	2000	
The Quick Detective	2000	
Across the Desert	2001	
City Field Platoon	2001	
Father and Son	2001	
My Life as McDull	2001	麥兜故事
The Eight Immortals Crossing the Sea	2001	
The Fighting Against the Millennium Bug	2001	
Fünf Wochen im Ballon	2001	
Legend of the Sacred Stone	2001	聖石傳說
Chestnut Dog and Banana Fox	2001	
Our Homeland	2001	
We're from North	2001	
Coco-Cosin's Family	2002	
Little Tiger's Way Home	2002	
Master Q: Incredible Pet Detective	2003	老夫子
McDull, Prince de la Bun	2004	麥兜菠蘿油王子
The Butterfly Lovers	2004	梁山伯與祝英台
DragonBlade	2005	龍刀奇緣
Little Soldier Zhang Ga Zhang Ga, The Soldier Boy	2005	小兵張嘎
Rest On Your Shoulder	2005	
Thru the Moebius Strip	2005	魔比斯環
I Go Youngster	2005	
Devil Soldiers in Mao-er Mountain	2006	帽兒山的鬼子兵
The Warrior	2006	黃飛鴻勇闖天下
The Big Fighting between Wukong and God Erlang	2007	
Monkey King vs. Er Lang Shen	2007	孫悟空大戰二郎神
Sparkling Red Star	2007	閃閃的紅星 孩子的天空
Storm Rider Clash of the Evils	2008	風雲決
Pleasant Goat and Big Big Wolf - The Super Adventure	2009	喜羊羊与灰太狼之牛气冲天
Forward, Comrades	2009	前进，达瓦里希

=== 2010s ===
English name	Year	Chinese name
A Jewish Girl in Shanghai	2010	犹太女孩在上海
Piercing I	2010	刺痛我
Pleasant Goat and Big Big Wolf: The Tiger Prowess	2010	喜羊羊与灰太狼之虎虎生威
The Dragon Knight	2011	洛克王国！圣龙骑士
Kuiba	2011	魁拔
Little Big Panda	2011	熊猫总动员
Moon Castle: The Space Adventure	2011	喜羊羊与灰太狼之兔年顶呱呱
Seer	2011	赛尔号之寻找凤凰神兽
The Grow	2012	金箍棒传奇
I Love Wolffy	2012	我爱灰太狼
Mission Incredible: Adventures on the Dragon's Trail	2012	喜羊羊与灰太狼之开心闯龙年
Seer 2	2012	赛尔号大电影2之雷伊与迈尔斯
Happy Heroes	2013	开心超人
I Love Wolffy 2	2013	我爱灰太狼2
Jungle Master	2013	绿林大冒险
Kunta	2013	昆塔：盒子总动员
The Mythical Ark: Adventures in Love & Happiness	2013	喜羊羊与灰太狼之喜气羊羊过蛇年
Roco Kingdom: The Desire of Dragon	2013	洛克王国2圣龙的心愿
Seer 3: Heroes Alliance	2013	赛尔号大电影3之战神联盟
The Ultimate Task	2013	终极大冒险
Xi Bai Po 2: Wang Er Xiao	2013	西柏坡2英雄王二小
The Adventures of Sinbad 2	2014	辛巴达历险记2
Armor Hero Atlas	2014	
Boonie Bears: To the Rescue	2014	熊出没之夺宝熊兵
Dragon Nest: Warriors' Dawn	2014	龙之谷：破晓奇兵
The Legend of Qin	2014	秦时明月3D电影龙腾万里
Farm House II	2014	
The Firefox of Bunnington Burrows	2014	
Food War	2014	
GG Bond 2	2014	猪猪侠之勇闯巨人岛
Happy Heroes 2 Qiyuan Planet Wars	2014	开心超人2: 启源星之战
Happy Little Submarines 4: Adventure of Octopus	2014	潜艇总动员4：章鱼奇遇记
Kuiba 3	2014	
Legend of the Moles – The Magic Train Adventure	2014	
The Lost 15 Boys: The Big Adventure on Pirates' Island	2014	
Magic Wonderland	2014	魔幻仙踪
The Magical Brush	2014	
McDull: Me & My Mum	2014	
Meet the Pegasus	2014	喜羊羊与灰太狼之飞马奇遇记
One Hundred Thousand Bad Jokes	2014	十万个冷笑话
Roco Kingdom 3	2014	洛克王国3：圣龙的守护
Secret Plans	2014	新大头儿子和小头爸爸之秘密计划
Seer 4	2014	赛尔号大电影4：圣魔之战
Shi Er Sheng Xiao Cheng Shi Ying Xiong	2014	十二生肖城市英雄
Snow White: The Power of Dwarfs	2014	
Tale of the Rally	2014	
Xin DaTou Er Zi He Xiao Tou Ba Ba Zhi Mi Mi Ji Hua	2014	
108 Demon Kings	2015	
10000 Years Later	2015	一万年以后
Alibaba and the Thief	2015	阿里巴巴：大盗奇兵
Aola Star	2015	奥拉星：进击圣殿
Bicycle Boy	2015	龙骑侠
Boonie Bears: Mystical Winter	2015	熊出没之雪岭熊风
Brave Rabbit 2 Crazy Circus	2015	闯堂兔2疯狂马戏团
Deity Hunt/God Hunter	2015	西游后传
The Grow 2	2015	金箍棒传奇2：沙僧的逆袭
Happy Little Submarine Magic Box of Time	2015	潜艇总动员5：时光宝盒
The Invincible Piglet (live action/animation)	2015	无敌小飞猪
The King of Tibetan AntelopeJu Ping	2015	藏羚羊之王
Kung Fu Style	2015	特功明星
The Legend of Lucky Pie	2015	
Legend of the Moles – The Magic Train Adventure	2015	
Legend of a Rabbit: The Martial of Fire	2015	兔侠之青黎传说
Monkey King: Hero Is Back	2015	西游记之大圣归来
Mr. Black: Green Star	2015	黑猫警长之翡翠之星
Pleasant Goat and Big Big Wolf – Amazing Pleasant Goat	2015	喜羊羊与灰太狼之羊年喜羊羊
Polar Adventure	2015	极地大反攻
Rabbit Hero	2015	超能兔战队
Roco Kingdom 4	2015	洛克王国4：出发！巨人谷
Seer 5: Rise of Thunder	2015	赛尔号大电影5：雷神崛起
Teenage Mao Zedong	2015	少年毛泽东
Where's the Dragon?	2015	龙在哪里?
Big Fish & Begonia	2016	大鱼海棠
Boonie Bears: The Big Top Secret	2016	熊出没之熊心归来
Dragon Nest: Throne of Elves	2016	
Godbeast Megazord: Return of Green Dragon	2016	
I Am Nezha	2016	我是哪吒
Kung Fu Panda 3	2016	
Little Door Gods	2016	小门神
New Happy Dad and Son 2: The Instant Genius	2016	新大头儿子和小头爸爸2一日成才
Rock Dog	2016	摇滚藏獒
Smart	2016	
Spiny Life	2016	天生我刺
Animal Crackers	2017	
Backkom Bear: Agent 008	2017	大卫贝肯之倒霉特工熊
Boonie Bears: Entangled Worlds	2017	熊出没·奇幻空间
Dahufa	2017	大护法
Drizzling After Sunshine	2017	饮湖上初晴后雨
GG Bond: Guarding	2017	猪猪侠之英雄猪少年
Have a Nice Day	2017	大世界 / 好极了
One Hundred Thousand Bad Jokes 2	2017	十万个冷笑话2
Seer Movie 6: Invincible Puni	2017	赛尔号大电影6：圣者无敌
Xing You Ji Zhi Feng Bao Fa Mi La	2017	星游记之风暴法米拉
SXD: Middle Kingdom (working title)	2018	
Boonie Bears: The Big Shrink	2018	熊出没·变形记
Crystal Sky of Yesterday	2018	昨日青空
Flavors of Youth	2018	肆式青春
New Happy Dad and Son 3: Adventure in Russia	2018	新大头儿子和小头爸爸3：俄罗斯奇遇记
White Snake	2018	白蛇：缘起
The Wind Guardians	2018	风语咒
Ye Si	2018	夜思
Boonie Bears: Blast Into the Past	2019	熊出没·原始时代
Mosley	2019	
Ne Zha	2019	哪吒之魔童降世
Seer Movie 7: Crazy Intelligence	2019	赛尔号大电影7：疯狂机器城
The Legend of Hei	2019	黑传奇黑传奇, Hēi chuánqí
UglyDolls	2019	

=== 2020s ===
English title	Date	Chinese title
Jiang Ziya	2020	姜子牙
Master Jiang and the Six Kingdoms	2020	我的师父姜子牙
Spycies	2020	动物特工局
Alibaba and the Magic Lamp	2020	阿里巴巴与神灯
China Panda	2020	中华熊猫
Guangyu, God of War	2020	
The Juvenile of King Yu	2020	禹神传之王者少年
Kung Fu Mulan	2020	木兰：横空出世
The Hero Battle	2020	士兵顺溜：兵王争锋
Son of Dragon God	2020	
Pobaby	2020	小破孩大状元
Salute to the Heroes	2020	最可爱的人
Pat & Mat	2020	呆瓜兄弟
Mr.Miao	2020	妙先生
The Old Man and Two Mountains	2020	新愚公移山
Avera and the mystical Kingdom 2	2020	小公主艾薇拉与神秘王国2
Realm of Terracotta	2021	俑之城
Wish Dragon	2021	
Extinct	2021	拯救甜甜圈：时空大营救
Goldbeak	2021	老鹰抓小鸡
Dear Tutu: Operation T-Rex	2021	大耳朵图图之霸王龙在行动
Tan Tan Meow: The Mermaid Princess	2021	探探猫人鱼公主
Boonie Bears: The Wild Life	2021	熊出没·狂野大陆
New Gods: Nezha Reborn	2021	新神榜：哪吒重生
Flower Angel	2021	小花仙大电影：奇迹少女
Dream Catche	2021	追梦少年
Magic Journey	2021	魔法奇程
The Fish's West Reef Adventure	2021	西游鱼之海底大冒险
Green Snake	2021	白蛇2：青蛇劫起
Agent Backkom：Kings Bear	2021	贝肯熊2：金牌特工
Three Piglets 3	2021	三只小猪3：正义大联萌
Crazy Racing	2021	恐龙飞车
GG Bond:Diary Of Dinosaurs	2021	猪猪侠大电影·恐龙日记
Baby Of Galaxy	2021	银河宝贝
The New Little Mermaid: Ocean Girl	2021	小美人鱼的奇幻冒险
Monkey King Reborn	2021	西游记之再世妖王
White Snake 2: The Tribulation of the Green Snake	2021	
Detective Swing	2021	摇摆神探
Master Ji Gong	2021	济公之降龙降世
Journey to the Center of the Deep Ocean	2021	潜艇总动员8：地心游记
The Three Pigs 3	2021	三只小猪3正义大联萌
New Happy Dad and Son 4: Perfect Dad	2021	新大头儿子和小头爸爸4：完美爸爸
I Am What I Am	2021	雄狮少年
Boonie Bears: Back to Earth	2022	熊出没·重返地球
Madness! Stolen Jewel of Guibao's Three Stars Constellation	2022	疯了！桂宝之三星夺宝
New Gods: Yang Jian	2022	新神榜：杨戬
Pleasant Goat and Big Big Wolf: Dunk for Future	2022	喜羊羊与灰太狼之筐出未来
Boonie Bears: Guardian Code	2023	熊出没·伴我“熊芯”
Boonie Bears: Time Twist	2024	熊出没·逆转时空
Chang'an	2023	长安三万里
Deep Sea	2023	深海
Oh My School!	2023	茶啊二中
I Am What I Am 2	2024	雄狮少年2
Boonie Bears: Future Reborn	2025	熊出没·重启未来
Ne Zha 2	2025	哪吒之魔童闹海
Nobody	2025	浪浪山小妖怪
All Wishes Come True!	2026	八仙！
Boonie Bears: The Hidden Protector	2026	熊出没·年年有熊
Niu Lai	2026	牛來
Peppa Pig: Perfect Holiday	2026	小猪佩奇:完美假期
Cosmic Crew: Ice Planet	2026	宇宙护卫队：百变流星
Shuke and Beita: The Miniature Humans	2026	舒克贝塔之微缩人类
New Happy Dad and Son 7 & Magical Eye Animated Movie: The Chaotic 7th Day	2026	新大头儿子和小头爸爸之天眼系列：失控的第七天
Pleasant Goat and Big Big Wolf: Dunk for Future 2	2027	喜羊羊与灰太狼之筐出未来2
Nai Long: Interdimensional Crisis	2027	奶龙·异次元危机
Goldbeak 2	2027	老鹰抓小鸡2
Phoenix & I	2027	凤凰与我
Boonie Bears: Inseparable	2027	熊出没·我们
Into the Mortal World 2	2028	落凡尘2
The Legend of Mountains and Seas: The Guardian of the Underworld	2029	山海奇闻之幽冥镇守录

== Highest-grossing films ==
The following are the Chinese animated feature films that surpass $1 million worldwide.

† Background shading indicates films playing in the week commencing 20 November 2026 in theaters around the world.

Rank	Title	Gross	Year	Ref
1	Ne Zha 2	$2,228,420,000	2025	
2	Ne Zha	$742,718,496	2019	
3	All Wishes Come True!	$307,784,556	2026	
4	Boonie Bears: Time Twist	$275,818,090	2024	
5	Chang'an	$254,944,972	2023	
6	Jiang Ziya	$243,887,233	2020	
7	Boonie Bears: Guardian Code	$221,982,308	2023	
8	Nobody	$215,367,669	2025	
9	Boonie Bears: The Hidden Protector	$154,000,000	2026	
10	Monkey King: Hero Is Back	$153,262,397	2015	
11	Boonie Bears: Back to Earth	$147,014,501	2022	
12	Deep Sea	$136,090,000	2023	
13	Boonie Bears: Blast Into the Past	$112,298,093	2019	
14	Boonie Bears: Future Reborn	$104,620,655	2025	
15	Boonie Bears: The Big Shrink	$96,509,976	2018	
16	Boonie Bears: The Wild Life	$93,172,870	2021	
17	Green Snake	$89,990,000	2021	
18	Big Fish & Begonia	$85,717,566	2016	
19	New Gods: Yang Jian	$82,430,000	2022	
20	Boonie Bears: Entangled Worlds	$77,072,065	2017	
21	The Legend of Hei II	$75,500,000	2025	
22	New Gods: Nezha Reborn	$70,070,914	2021	
23	White Snake	$64,558,608	2018	
24	White Snake: Afloat	$60,632,561	2024	
25	Oh My School!	$52,626,747	2023	
26	The Legend of Hei	$48,507,082	2019	
27	Boonie Bears: Mystical Winter	$47,581,416	2015	
28	Boonie Bears: The Big Top Secret	$45,150,390	2016	
29	Boonie Bears: To the Rescue	$39,910,000	2014	
30	I Am What I Am	$39,463,557	2021	
31	Pleasant Goat and Big Big Wolf: Mission Incredible: Adventures on the Dragon's Trail	$25,800,000	2012	
32	Pleasant Goat and Big Big Wolf: Dunk for Future	$25,140,000	2022	
33	To Your Island	$23,539,562	2026	
34	New Happy Dad and Son 3: Adventure in Russia	$23,130,469	2018	
35	Moon Castle: The Space Adventure	$21,847,806	2011	
36	The Mythical Ark: Adventures in Love & Happiness	$19,713,518	2013	
37	The Wind Guardians	$16,558,135	2018	
38	Seer 6: Invincible Puni	$16,127,000	2018	
39	The Three Kingdoms Part 1: The Battle for Luoyang	$14,700,000	2026	
40	Dahufa	$14,404,962	2017	
41	New Happy Dad and Son 2: The Instant Genius	$13,375,370	2016	
42	Pleasant Goat and Big Big Wolf: The World Guardians	$13,001,669	2024	
43	Seer 3: Heroes Alliance	$12,347,000	2013	
44	New Happy Dad and Son 5: My Alien Friend	$12,260,000	2022	
45	Little Door Gods	$11,902,156	2016	
46	Roco Kingdom 4: Go! Valley of the Giants	$11,810,000	2015	
47	I Am What I Am 2	$11,315,594	2024	
48	Pleasant Goat and Big Big Wolf - The Super Adventure	$11,197,401	2009	
49	Realm of Terracotta	$10,755,028	2021	
50	Peppa Pig: Perfect Holiday †	$10,451,768	2026	

=== Highest-grossing films in China ===
The following are Chinese animated feature films that surpass $1 million in China.

Rank	Title	Gross	Year	Ref
1	Ne Zha 2	$2,002,730,000	2025	
2	Ne Zha	$673,147,972	2019	
3	Boonie Bears: Time Twist	$275,549,042	2024	
4	Chang'an	$254,944,972	2023	
5	Jiang Ziya	$243,887,233	2020	
6	Boonie Bears: Guardian Code	$221,982,308	2023	
7	Monkey King: Hero Is Back	$153,262,397	2015	
8	Boonie Bears: Back to Earth	$147,014,501	2022	
9	Deep Sea	$136,090,000	2023	
10	Boonie Bears: Blast Into the Past	$110,594,552	2019	
11	Boonie Bears: The Big Shrink	$96,509,976	2018	
12	Boonie Bears: The Wild Life	$93,172,870	2021	
13	Green Snake	$89,990,000	2021	
14	Big Fish & Begonia	$85,717,566	2016	
15	New Gods: Yang Jian	$82,430,000	2022	
16	Boonie Bears: Entangled Worlds	$77,072,065	2017	
17	New Gods: Nezha Reborn	$70,070,914	2021	
18	White Snake	$64,558,608	2018	
19	Oh My School!	$52,626,747	2023	
20	The Legend of Hei	$48,507,082	2019	
21	Boonie Bears: Mystical Winter	$47,581,416	2015	
22	Boonie Bears: The Big Top Secret	$45,150,390	2016	
23	Boonie Bears: To the Rescue	$39,910,000	2014	
24	I Am What I Am	$39,463,557	2021	
25	The Wind Guardians	$16,558,135	2018	
26	Dahufa	$14,404,962	2017	
27	Little Door Gods	$11,902,156	2016	
28	Realm of Terracotta	$10,755,028	2021	
29	Dragon Nest: Warriors' Dawn	$9,841,578	2014	
30	The Legend of Qin	$9,750,496	2014	

== See also ==
- List of Chinese animated series
- History of Chinese animation
- Manhua
