= List of animated feature films of 2015 =

This is a list of animated feature films that were released in 2015.

== List ==
Animated feature films of 2015
Title	Country	Director	Production company	Animation technique	Notes	Type	Release date	Duration
3 Bahadur	Pakistan	Sharmeen Obaid Chinoy	Waadi Animations	Computer			May 22, 2015 (Pakistan); November 13, 2015 (Worldwide)	94 minutes
108 Demon Kings; 108 rois-démons	France; Belgium; Luxembourg; Ireland; China	Pascal Morelli	Gébéka Films, Scope Pictures, Bidibul Productions, Fundamental Films	Computer			December 4, 2014 (Forum des Images); January 21, 2015 (France)	104 minutes
10000 Years Later 天籁之一萬年以后	China	Yi Li		Computer			March 27, 2015	93 minutes
A Jewish Girl in Shanghai: The Mystery of the Necklace	China	Guanghua Yao		Traditional			August 28, 2015	83 minutes
A Tale From The Orient 天眼传奇	China	Chih-Chung Tsai, Daniel Ming-Chin Tsai	Zhejiang Zhongnan Animation Co.	Traditional			October 4, 2015	90 minutes
A Warrior's Tail; Савва. Сердце воина	Russia	Maxim Fadeev	Art Pictures Studio, Glukoza Production	Computer			November 12, 2015 (Russia); March 26, 2016 (United States)	85 Minutes
Adama	France	Simon Rouby	Pipangai Production, Naia Productions	Traditional / Computer			June 15, 2015 (Annecy); October 21, 2015 (France)	82 minutes
The Adventures of Little Piglet Banna	China	Ming Zhang, Zhaohui Weng	Zhejiang Huanqin Media	Flash			June 27, 2015	90 minutes
Aikatsu! Music Award: Minna de Shō o Moraima SHOW!	Japan	Shinya Watada		Traditional			August 23, 2015	56 minutes
Air Bound; Gamba: Gamba to Nakama-tachi	Japan	Tomohiro Kawamura, Yoshihiro Komori	Arad Productions, Grindstone Pictures, Shirogumi, Toei Animation	Computer			October 10, 2015	92 minutes
Alvin and the Chipmunks: The Road Chip	United States	Walt Becker	20th Century Fox	Computer / Live action	Theatrical		December 18, 2015	92 minutes
Ajin Part 1: Shōdō	Japan	Hiroaki Ando	Polygon Pictures	Computer			October 28, 2015 (TIFF); November 27, 2015 (Japan)	106 minutes
Albert (2015 film)	Denmark	Karsten Kiilerich	M&M Productions, A. Film	Computer			February 26, 2015	70 minutes
Alibaba and the Thief 阿里巴巴：大盗奇兵	China	Zheng Chengfeng		Computer			May 23, 2015	80 minutes
Alpha and Omega: Family Vacation	United States; Canada	Richard Rich	Lionsgate; Crest Animation Productions	Computer		Direct-to-video	August 4, 2015	45 minutes
Animal Kingdom: Let's Go Ape; Pourquoi j'ai pas mangé mon père	France; Belgium; Italy	Jamel Debbouze	Pathé, Boréales, Kiss Films	Computer			April 8, 2015	113 minutes
Anomalisa	United States	Charlie Kaufman, Duke Johnson	Paramount Pictures, Paramount Animation, Starburns Industries, Snoot Entertainment	Stop-motion			September 4, 2015 (Telluride Film Festival); December 30, 2015 (United States)	90 minutes
The Anthem of the Heart; Kokoro ga Sakebitagatterun Da	Japan	Tatsuyuki Nagai	A-1 Pictures	Traditional			September 19, 2015	119 minutes
April and the Extraordinary World; Avril et le monde truqué	France; Belgium; Canada	Franck Ekinci, Christian Desmares	Je Suis Bien Content, StudioCanal, Kaibou Production UMT, Need Productions, Arte France Cinéma, Jouror Distribution, RTBF, Proximus, Tchack	Traditional / Computer			June 15, 2015 (Annecy); November 4, 2015 (France and Belgium); February 19, 2016 (Canada)	106 minutes
Arpeggio of Blue Steel	Japan	Seiji Kishi	Sanzigen	Traditional	Compilation film		January 31, 2015	105 minutes
Arpeggio of Blue Steel -Ars Nova Cadenza-	Japan	Seiji Kishi	Sanzigen	Traditional			October 3, 2015	105 minutes
Attack on Titan Part 2: Wings of Freedom	Japan	Tetsuro Araki	Wit Studio	Traditional			June 27, 2015	119 minutes
Aura Star: Attack of the Temple 奥拉星：进击圣殿	China	Frankie Chung	Pearl River Film Group; Guangzhou Baitian Information Technology; Toonmax Media; Talent Manufacture; Meiya Media; Hongtu Guanghe Film Investment Fund	Computer			July 23, 2015	92 minutes
The Autobots 汽车人总动员	China	Jianrong Zhuo	Bluemtv, G-Point	Computer			July 4, 2015	85 minutes
El Bandido Cucaracha	Spain	Juan Alonso, Héctor Pisa	Second Man Productions	Stop motion			December 12, 2015 (Huesca International Film Festival)	74 minutes
Barbie & Her Sisters in The Great Puppy Adventure	United States	Andrew Tan	Universal Studios, Arc Productions, Rainmaker Studios	Computer			October 20, 2015	76 minutes
Barbie in Princess Power	United States	Ezekiel Norton	Universal Studios, Arc Productions, Rainmaker Studios	Computer			March 3, 2015	73 minutes
Barbie in Rock'n Royals	United States	Karen J. Lloyd & Michael Goguen	Universal Studios, Arc Productions, Rainmaker Studios	Computer			September 8, 2015	80 minutes
Batman vs. Robin	United States	Jay Oliva	Warner Bros. Animation, DC Entertainment	Traditional		Direct-to-video	April 7, 2015 (digital); April 14, 2015 (physical)	80 minutes
Batman Unlimited: Animal Instincts	United States	Butch Lukic	Warner Bros. Animation, DC Entertainment	Traditional		Direct-to-video	May 12, 2015	77 minutes
Batman Unlimited: Monster Mayhem	United States	Butch Lukic	Warner Bros. Animation, DC Entertainment	Traditional		Direct-to-video	August 18, 2015	81 minutes
Beyond the Boundary: I'll Be Here	Japan	Taichi Ishidate	Kyoto Animation	Traditional			March 14, 2015 (Past); April 25, 2015 (Future)	86 minutes 89 minutes
Bicycle Boy	China	Liu Kexin		Computer			January 1, 2015	90 minutes
Bilal: A New Breed of Hero	United Arab Emirates	Khurram Alavi	Barajoun Entertainment	Computer			December 9, 2015 (Dubai Film Festival); September 8, 2016 (Dubai); February 2, 2018 (United States)	109 minutes
Birdboy: The Forgotten Children; Psiconautas, los niños olvidados	Spain	Pedro Rivero, Alberto Vázquez	Basque Films	Traditional			September 24, 2015 (San Sebastian Film Festival)	76 minutes
Blinky Bill the Movie	Australia	Deane Taylor	Flying Bark Productions; Telegael; Screen Australia; Studio 100 Animation; Screen NSW; Lusomundo; StudioCanal	Computer			September 17, 2015	93 minutes
Boonie Bears: Mystical Winter 熊出没之雪岭熊风	China	Ding Liang, Liu Fuyuan	Fantawild Animation, Le Vision Pictures (Tianjin) Co., Pearl River Film Group, Shenzhen Huaqiang Shuzi Dongman	Computer			January 30, 2015	96 minutes
Boruto: Naruto the Movie	Japan	Hiroyuki Yamashita	Studio Pierrot	Traditional			August 7, 2015	96 minutes
The Boy and the Beast; Bakemono no Ko	Japan	Mamoru Hosoda	Studio Chizu	Traditional			July 11, 2015	120 minutes
Brave Rabbit 2 Crazy Circus 闯堂兔2疯狂马戏团	China	Zeng Xianlin		Computer			January 1, 2015	88 minutes
Cafard	France; Netherlands; Belgium	Jan Bultheel	Tarantula Belgique, Tondo Films, Topkapi Films	Computer			September 23, 2015 (Belgium); December 12, 2015 (France)	92 minutes
Canine Team; Selección Canina	Mexico	Carlos Pimentel; Nathan Sifuentes	Animex Producciones, Nahuala Films	Computer			April 24, 2015	90 minutes
Capture the Flag; Atrapa la Bandera	Spain	Enrique Gato	Lightbox Entertainment, Telecinco Cinema, Telefónica Studios	Computer			August 25, 2015	94 minutes
Caroline and the Magic Potion; Brujerías	Spain	Virginia Curiá	Latido Films, Moonbite Studios, Santisound	Computer			September 15, 2015	79 minutes
The Case of Hana & Alice	Japan	Shunji Iwai		Traditional			February 20, 2015	99 minutes
Chibi Maruko-chan: Italia Kara Kita Shōnen	Japan	Jun Takagi	Nippon Animation	Traditional			December 23, 2015	94 minutes(or 95 minutes)
CJ7: Super Q Team 长江7号：超萌特攻队	China	William Kan	Xuelang Dock Media; YL Pictures	Computer			September 26, 2015	80 minutes
Crayon Shin-Chan: My Moving Story! Cactus Large Attack!	Japan	Masakazu Hashimoto	Shin-Ei Animation; TV Asahi; ADK; Futabasha	Traditional			April 18, 2015	104 minutes
Curious George 3: Back to the Jungle	United States	Norton Virgien	Imagine Entertainment, Universal 1440 Entertainment, Tycoon Animation, BV Animation Studio	Traditional		Direct-to-Video	June 23, 2015	81 minutes
Date A Live: Mayuri Judgement	Japan	Keitaro Motonaga	Production IMS	Traditional			August 22, 2015	72 minutes
Detective Conan: Sunflowers of Inferno	Japan	Kobun Shizuno	TMS Entertainment	Traditional			April 18, 2015	112 minutes
Digimon Adventure tri. Reunion	Japan	Keitaro Motonaga	Toei Animation	Traditional			November 21, 2015	86 minutes (Part 1)
Doraemon: Nobita's Space Hero Record of Space Heroes	Japan	Yoshihiro Osugi	Shin-Ei Animation	Traditional			March 7, 2015	100 minutes
Dragon Ball Z: Resurrection 'F'	Japan	Tadayoshi Yamamuro	Toei Animation	Traditional			April 18, 2015	94 minutes (theatrical)
Eiga Yo-Kai Watch: Enma Daioh to Itsutsu no Monogatari da Nyan!	Japan	Shigeharu Takahashi, Shinji Ushiro	OLM, Inc.	Traditional			December 19, 2015	94 minutes
The Empire of Corpses	Japan	Ryoutarou Makihara	Wit Studio	Traditional			October 2, 2015	126 minutes
Enchanted Mirror Romance 魔镜奇缘	China	Chengfeng Zheng	Beijing Fengshang Ruizhi Media Co.	Computer			September 3, 2015	81 minutes
The Firefox of Bunnington Burrows 兔子镇的火狐狸	China	Ge Shuiying	Kunshan Zhangpu Haoshanshui Animation; Beijing Shuzi Linghai Films Technology; Erduosishi Hengqida Media, Beijing G-POINT Film Culture Media 河南约克动漫影视股份有限公司 维乐享电影文化（北京）有限公司; Aiweixiao Culture Media (Beijing)	Computer			October 30, 2015	90 minutes
The Flintstones & WWE: Stone Age SmackDown!	United States	Spike Brandt; Tony Cervone	Warner Bros. Animation, Hanna-Barbera, WWE Studios	Traditional		Direct-to-video	March 10, 2015	51 minutes
Fortress; Крепость	Russia	Fedor Dmitriev	CTB Film Company, Melnitsa Animation Studio	Traditional			October 29, 2015	76 minutes
Gekijōban Meiji Tokyo Renka: Yumihari no Serenade	Japan	Hiroshi Watanabe	Studio Deen	Traditional			July 18, 2015	60 minutes
Gekijō-ban PriPara Mi~nna Atsumare! Prism Tours	Japan	Masakazu Hishida	Tatsunoko Production	Traditional			March 7, 2015	90 minutes
Get Squirrely	United States	Ross Venokur	Vanguard Animation	Computer			June 20, 2015 (Japan); November 4, 2016	83 minutes
GG Bond Movie: Ultimate Battle 猪猪侠之终极决战	China	Jinming Lu, Jinhui Lu	Guangdong Winsing Animation; Toonmax Media; Pearl River Pictures; Guangdong TV Jiajia Cartoon; Beijing Dongfang Huamian Film	Computer			July 10, 2015	90 minutes
Girls und Panzer der Film	Japan	Tsutomu Mizushima	Actas	Traditional			November 20, 2015 (Tokyo); November 21, 2015 (Japan)	120 minutes
Go! Anpanman: Mija and the Magic Lamp ja:それいけ!アンパンマン ミージャと魔法のランプ	Japan	Hiroyuki Yano	Anpanman Production Committee, TMS Entertainment	Traditional			July 4, 2015	46 minutes
The Good Dinosaur	United States	Peter Sohn	Pixar Animation Studios	Computer			November 10, 2015 (Paris); November 25, 2015	97 minutes
Goosebumps	United States	Rob Letterman	Sony Pictures Animation	Computer / Live action			October 16, 2015	103 minutes
The Grow 2 金箍棒传奇2：沙僧的逆袭	China	Ha Lei		Traditional			May 29, 2015	91 minutes
Gulu Mermaid	China	Guangfu Yang					December 20, 2015	90 minutes
Happy Little Submarine Magic Box of Time 潜艇总动员5：时光宝盒	China	He Zili		Computer			May 29, 2015	80 minutes
Happy Panda 2: Panda Hero Legend	China	Jia Wu, Jiye Tang	Kunshan Feifan Animation Co. Zhejiang Zhongnan Animation Co.	Flash			August 15, 2015	81 minutes
Harmony	Japan	Takashi Nakamura, Michael Arias	Studio 4°C	Traditional			November 13, 2015	119 minutes
Hell and Back	United States	Tom Gianas, Ross Shuman	ShadowMachine	Stop motion			October 2, 2015	84 minutes
High Speed! Free! Starting Days	Japan	Yasuhiro Takemoto	Kyoto Animation	Traditional			December 5, 2015	110 minutes
Hikawa Maru Monogatari	Japan	Shunji Ōga	Mushi Production	Traditional / Computer			August 22, 2015	90 minutes
Home	United States	Tim Johnson	DreamWorks Animation	Computer			March 7, 2015 (BIFF); March 27, 2015	94 minutes
Hotel Transylvania 2	United States	Genndy Tartakovsky	Sony Pictures Animation	Computer			September 25, 2015	89 minutes
Huevos: Little Rooster's Egg-cellent Adventure, Un gallo con muchos huevos	Mexico	Gabriel Riva Palacio	Huevocartoon Producciones; Simka Entertainment	Computer			August 20, 2015	98 minutes
Inside Out	United States	Pete Docter, Ronnie del Carmen	Pixar Animation Studios	Computer			May 18, 2015 (Cannes); June 19, 2015	95 minutes
Justice League: Gods and Monsters	United States	Sam Liu	Warner Bros. Animation, DC Entertainment	Traditional		Direct-to-Video	July 21, 2015 (Digital); July 28, 2015 (Physical)	76 minutes
Justice League: Throne of Atlantis	United States	Ethan Spaulding	Warner Bros. Animation, DC Entertainment	Traditional		Direct-to-Video	January 13, 2015 (Digital); January 27, 2015 (United States)	72 minutes
The King of Tibetan Antelope	China	Yujun Liu	Shenzhen Tianyuxing Entertainment	Flash			November 20, 2015	83 minutes
Knights of Sidonia	Japan	Kōbun Shizuno	Polygon Pictures	Traditional			March 6, 2015	134 minutes
Kōkaku Kidōtai Shin Gekijōban	Japan	Kazuya Nomura	Production I.G	Traditional			June 20, 2015	100 minutes
Kung Fu Style	China	Xu Kerr	Shanghai Hippo Animation Co.	Computer			April 10, 2015	90 minutes
Kuru Kuru and Friends: The Secrets of the Rainbow Tree 꾸루꾸루와 친구들:무지개 나무의 비밀	South Korea	Jisoo Han; Moon Jae-dea	Ffango Entertoyment	Stop Motion			November 11, 2015	74 minutes
Kwai Boo 桂宝之爆笑闯宇宙	China	Yunfei Wang	Beijing Juhe Yinglian Media; Beijing Motianlun Media	Computer			August 6, 2015	95 minutes
Last Prince of Atlantis; Последний человек Атлантиды	Russia	Vladlen Barbe	InlayFilm	Computer			2015	84 minutes
Legend of a Rabbit: The Martial of Fire 兔侠之青黎传说	China	Ma Yuan, Dong Dake	TianJin BeiFang Film Group Co., LTD; Beijing Century Butterfly Animation Production Co., Ltd; Beijing Luyi Jiuying Pictures Media Co., Ltd; China Beijing Television Station; Toonmax Media Co., Ltd; Tianjin Radio and television Beijing Wanzhong Canlan Entertainment Co., Ltd; Beijing Xinghe Lianmeng Entertainment Co., Ltd; YL Pictures; American Aurora Pictures International Ltd	Computer			February 21, 2015	90 minutes
Legend of the Moles – The Magic Train Adventure 摩尔庄园3：魔幻列车大冒险	China	Li Tingting	Shanghai Taomee Network & Technology Co., Ltd. China Film Group Corporation; Beijing KAKU Cartoon Satellite TV; Hunan TV Aniworld Satellite TV	Traditional			February 5, 2015	86 minutes
Lego DC Comics Super Heroes: Justice League – Attack of the Legion of Doom	United States	Rick Morales	Warner Bros. Animation, DC Entertainment, The Lego Group	Computer		Direct-to-Video	August 25, 2015	72 minutes
Lego DC Comics Super Heroes: Justice League vs. Bizarro League	United States	Brandon Vietti	Warner Bros. Animation, DC Entertainment, The Lego Group	Computer		Direct-to-Video	February 10, 2015	49 minutes
Little from the Fish Shop; Malá z rybárny	Czech Republic; France; Slovakia	Jan Balej	Miracle Film	Stop motion			May 28, 2015	75 minutes
The Little Man; Malý pán	Czech Republic; Slovakia	Radek Beran	Bedna Films; Czech Television; Fantomas Production	Puppetry			April 30, 2015	83 minutes
The Little Mermaid: Attack of the Pirates 美人鱼之海盗来袭	China	Adam Qiu	Fu Jian Heng ye Film Distribution CO. Gold Valley Films	Computer			July 31, 2015	77 minutes
The Little Prince; Le Petit Prince	France; Italy	Mark Osborne	Onyx Films, Orange Studio, LPPTV, ON Animation Studios	Stop motion / Computer			May 22, 2015 (Cannes Film Festival); July 29, 2015 (France)	108 minutes
Long Way North; Tout en haut du monde	France; Denmark	Rémi Chayé	Sacrebleu Productions, Maybe Movies, Noerlum Studios, 2 Minutes Animation	Traditional / Computer			June 16, 2015 (Annecy); January 27, 2016 (France)	80 minutes
Looney Tunes: Rabbits Run	United States	Jeff Siergey	Warner Bros. Animation	Traditional		Direct-to-Video	July 7, 2015 (Walmart/Vudu); August 4, 2015 (General)	75 minutes
Louis and Luca – The Big Cheese Race; Solan og Ludvig – Herfra til Flåklypa	Norway	Rasmus A. Sivertsen	Qvisten Animation, Maipo Film, Kari and Kjell Aukrust's Foundation	Stop motion			December 25, 2015	78 minutes
Love Live! The School Idol Movie	Japan	Takahiko Kyōgoku	Sunrise	Traditional			June 13, 2015	99 minutes
The Magic Mountain	Romania; France; Poland	Anca Damian	Aparte Film, Arizona Productions, Filmograf	Mixed			June 17, 2015 (Annecy); October 9, 2015 (Romania); December 23, 2015 (France)	89 minutes
Minions	United States	Pierre Coffin, Kyle Balda	Illumination Entertainment	Computer			June 11, 2015 (Odeon Leicester Square); July 10, 2015	91 minutes
Miss Hokusai 百日紅	Japan	Keiichi Hara	Production I.G	Traditional			May 9, 2015	90 minutes
Monkey King: Hero Is Back 西游记之大圣归来	China	Xiaopeng Tian	Beijing Weiyingshidai Culture & Media, Hengdian Chinese Film Production Co., October Media, S&C Pictures	Computer			July 10, 2015	90 minutes
Morengen Bear vs Man	China	Jianjun Ma; Pengcheng Wang		Traditional			2015	
Mr. Black: Green Star 黑猫警长之翡翠之星	China	Shengjun Yu, Xuegang Shi, Song Qing, Yi Shi	Shanghai Film Group; Shanghai Animation Film Studio; Fengwei (Shanghai) Entertainment; Beijing Weiying Shidai Technology	Traditional			August 7, 2015	83 minutes
My Little Pony: Equestria Girls – Friendship Games	United States; Canada	Ishi Rudell	Hasbro Studios, DHX Media	Flash			September 17, 2015 (Angelika Film Center); September 26, 2015 (Discovery Family and Family Channel)	72 minutes (DVD/Blu-ray)
The Nutcracker Sweet	Peru	Eduardo Schuldt	Aronnax Animation Studios	Computer			June 3, 2015	80 minutes
Ooops! Noah Is Gone... Oops! Die Arche ist weg...	Germany; Belgium; Luxembourg; Ireland	Toby Genkel, Sean McCormack	Ulysses Filmproduktion; Fabrique d'Images; Skyline Entertainment; Moetion Films; Studio Rakete; The Picture Factory; Grid Animation	Computer			February 26, 2015 (Luxembourg City Film Festival); May 1, 2015 (Ireland); July 17, 2015 (United States); July 30, 2015 (Germany)	87 minutes
Open Season: Scared Silly	United States	David Feiss	Sony Pictures Animation	Computer		Direct-to-Video	December 18, 2015 (Turkey); March 8, 2016	85 minutes
The Peanuts Movie	United States	Steve Martino	Blue Sky Studios	Computer			November 1, 2015 (New York City premiere); November 6, 2015	88 minutes
Peppa Pig: The Golden Boots	United Kingdom	Neville Astley, Mark Baker	Entertainment One	Flash		Television film	February 14, 2015	15 minutes
Persona 3 The Movie: No. 3, Falling Down	Japan	Keitaro Motonaga	A-1 Pictures	Traditional			April 4, 2015	87 minutes
Phantom Boy	France; Belgium	Alain Gagnol, Jean-Loup Felicioli	Folimage	Traditional			September 12, 2015 (TIFF); October 14, 2015 (France)	84 minutes
Pirate's Passage	Canada	Mike Barth, Jamie Gallant	Martin's River Ink, PiP Animation Services, Tandem Communications	Flash		Television film	January 4, 2015	88 minutes
Pixels	United States; China	Chris Columbus	Columbia Pictures; Happy Madison Productions; 1492 Pictures; LStar Capital; China Film Group; Film Croppers Entertainment	Computer / Live action			July 24, 2015	106 minutes
Pixies	Canada	Sean Patrick O'Reilly	Arcana Studio	Computer			June 5, 2015	78 minutes
Pleasant Goat and Big Big Wolf – Amazing Pleasant Goat 喜羊羊与灰太狼之羊年喜羊羊	China	Huang Weiming	Shanghai Film Group; Alpha Pictures Investment (Beijing); Creative Power Entertaining; Beijing TV Kaku Kids Channel; Jiangsu Youman Cartoon TV; Guangdong Jia-jia Cartoon Channel; Beijing Guolong Film Distributors	Traditional			January 31, 2015	86 minutes
Pokémon the Movie: Hoopa and the Clash of Ages	Japan	Kunihiko Yuyama	OLM, Inc., Shogakukan-Shueisha Productions	Computer			July 18, 2015	78 minutes
Polar Adventure 极地大反攻	China	Fang Qiao	Su Zhou Ou Rui Dong Man; Beijing G-POINT Film Culture Media	Computer			October 1, 2015	94 minutes
Pororo 3: Cyber Space Adventure 뽀로로 극장판3 : 컴퓨터왕국대모험	South Korea	Chanwook Park; Young Kyun Park	Korea Creative Content Agency; Korean Film Council; Korean Small and Medium Business Administration; Ocon Studios; SK Broadband; Winner Cultural Media	Computer			December 13, 2015	90 minutes
PreCure All Stars: Spring Carnival	Japan	Junji Shimizu	Toei Animation	Traditional			March 14, 2015	74 minutes
Princess of Rome	Iran	Hadi Muhammadian	HonarPooya Group	Computer			February 1, 2015 (Fajr International Film Festival); October 4, 2015 (Iran)	75 minutes
Psycho-Pass: The Movie	Japan	Naoyoshi Shiotani	Production I.G	Traditional			January 9, 2015	113 minutes
Rabbit Hero	China	Fu Yan					May 30, 2015	80 minutes
Raven the Little Rascal – The Big Race; Der kleine Rabe Socke 2	Germany	Ute von Münchow-Pohl, Sandor Jesse	Studio 88	Traditional			August 20, 2015	73 minutes
Regular Show: The Movie	United States	J. G. Quintel	Cartoon Network Studios	Traditional		Television film	August 14, 2015 (The Downtown Independent); September 1, 2015 (digital release); October 13, 2015 (DVD); November 25, 2015 (TV)	68 minutes
Reveries of a Solitary Walker	Italy	Paolo Gaudio	Smart Brands	Claymation			November 1, 2014 (Samain du Cinéma Fantastique); November 26, 2015 (Italy)	87 minutes
Roco Kingdom 4 洛克王国4：出发！巨人谷	China	Hugues Martel, Dongbiao Cao	Tencent Pictures; Jiangsu Youman Cartoon TV; Beijing Enlight Pictures; More Fun Studio; Wepiao; Dianping.com	Traditional			August 13, 2015	83 minutes
Scooby-Doo! and Kiss: Rock and Roll Mystery	United States	Spike BrandtTony Cervone	Warner Bros. Animation, Hanna-Barbera	Traditional		Direct-to-Video	July 10, 2015 (Digital); July 21, 2015 (DVD and Blu-ray)	79 minutes
Scooby-Doo! Moon Monster Madness	United States	Paul McEvoy	Warner Bros. Animation, Hanna-Barbera	Traditional		Direct-to-Video	February 3, 2015 (Digital); February 17, 2015 (DVD)	80 minutes
Seer Movie 5: Rise of Thunder 赛尔号大电影5：雷神崛起	China	Zhangjun Wang	Shanghai Taomi Animation; Beijing Enlight Media; Beijing Iqiyi; Beijing KAKU Cartoon Satellite TV	Computer			July 23, 2015	90 minutes
Sergiy Radonezhsky. The Legend of Miracle Worker; Наследники	Russia	Vladimir Khotinenko	Da-Studio	Traditional			October 22, 2015	
Shaun the Sheep Movie	United Kingdom	Richard Starzak; Mark Burton	Aardman Animations; StudioCanal	Stop motion			January 24, 2015 (Sundance); February 6, 2015	85 minutes
Shimajiro and the Mother Tree	Japan	Isamu Hirabayashi	Benesse, The Answer Studio	Live Action, Traditional			January 1, 2015	61 minutes
Sinbad: Sora Tobu Hime to Himitsu no Shima	Japan	Shinpei Miyashita	Nippon Animation, Shirogumi	Traditional			July 4, 2015	50 minutes
Snow White: The Mysterious Father 白雪公主之神秘爸爸	China	Ben Zhao		Computer			August 14, 2015	78 minutes
Snowtime! La Guerre des tuques 3D	Canada	Jean-François Pouliot	CarpeDiem Film & TV	Computer			November 13, 2015	82 minutes
Space Forces 2911; Uzay Kuvvetleri 2911	Turkey	Şahin Michael Derun	Animaj	Computer			April 20, 2015	91 minutes
The SpongeBob Movie: Sponge Out of Water	United States	Paul Tibbitt; Mike Mitchell	Nickelodeon Movies; Paramount Animation	Traditional / Computer / Live action			January 28, 2015 (Belgium); February 6, 2015 (United States)	92 minutes
Strange Magic	United States	Gary Rydstrom	Lucasfilm, Lucasfilm Animation, Industrial Light & Magic	Computer			January 23, 2015	99 minutes
Tamayura: Sotsugyō Shashin Dai-1-bu -Kizashi-	Japan	Junichi Sato	TYO Animations	Traditional			April 4, 2015	52 minutes (Part 1)
Tamayura: Sotsugyō Shashin Dai-2-bu -Hibiki-	Japan	Junichi Sato	TYO Animations	Traditional			August 29, 2015	52 minutes (Part 2)
Tamayura 3	Japan	Junichi Sato	TYO Animations	Traditional			November 28, 2015	51 minutes (Part 3)
Ted 2	United States	Seth MacFarlane	Universal Pictures	Computer / Live action			June 26, 2015	115 minutes
Teenage Mao Zedong 少年毛泽东	China	Lei Junlin		Computer			April 30, 2015	76 minutes
Thomas & Friends: Sodor's Legend of the Lost Treasure	United States	David Stoten	Arc Productions, HiT Entertainment	Computer			July 17, 2015 (United Kingdom); September 8, 2015 (United States)	60 minutes (UK); 63 minutes (US)
Three Heroes. Horse Course; Три богатыря. Ход конём	Russia	Konstantin Feoktisov	CTB Film Company, Melnitsa Animation Studio	Traditional			January 1, 2015	74 minutes
The Three Pigs and the Lamp 三只小猪与神灯	China	Wei Liu	Mili Pictures	Computer			July 4, 2015	80 minutes
Tom and Jerry: Spy Quest	United States	Spike Brandt, Tony Cervone	Warner Bros. Animation, Hanna-Barbera, Turner Entertainment	Traditional		Direct-to-Video	June 9, 2015 (Digital); June 23, 2015 (DVD)	73 minutes
Top Cat Begins	Mexico; India	Andres Couturier	Ánima Estudios	Computer			October 30, 2015	90 minutes
Trenk, the Little Knight; Ritter Trenk	Germany; Austria	Anthony Power	Blue Eyes Fiction, WunderWerk, Dor Film Produktionsgesellschaft	Traditional			November 5, 2015	75 minutes
Two Buddies and a Badger; Knutsen & Ludvigsen og den fæle Rasputin	Norway	Rasmus A. Sivertsen; Rune Spaans	Tordenfilm AS; Qvisten Animation; Neofilm; Atmo Media Network; Film Fund FUZZ	Computer			September 20, 2015 (Trondheim); September 25, 2015 (Norway)	75 minutes
UFO Gakuen no Himitsu	Japan	Isamu Imakake	IRH Press Co.	Traditional			October 10, 2015	125 minutes
VeggieTales: Noah's Ark	United States	Mike Nawrocki	Big Idea Productions	Computer		Direct-to-Video	March 3, 2015	50 minutes
Wake Up, Girls! Beyond the Bottom	Japan	Yutaka Yamamoto	Ordet	Traditional			December 11, 2015	53 minutes
Wake Up, Girls! The Shadow of Youth	Japan	Yutaka Yamamoto	Ordet	Traditional			September 25, 2015	55 minutes
When Black Birds Fly	United States	Jimmy ScreamerClauz	Draconian Films	CG animation			November 13, 2015 (Housecore); January 15, 2016	95 minutes
Where's the Dragon? 龙在哪里？	China	Sing-Choong Foo	Beijing Dedao Education Investment; Beijing Duobaoshu Entertainment; Hongkong Longzai Nali; Caihong Engineering 北京星美影视发行有限公司	Computer			October 23, 2015	97 minutes
Wicked Flying Monkeys	Mexico; India	Albert Mar	Ánima Estudios	Computer			April 10, 2015	86 minutes
The Winner	China	Dai Mao					December 12, 2015	85 minutes
Xinnian is Coming – Uproar of Chuxi	China	Yu Mingliang, Yang Xiaojun, Liang Donglong	Tianjin Binhai Xinqu Guoshi Jingwei Media Co., Ltd; Beijing Guoshi Jingwei Science And Technology Co., Ltd; Lasai Guoshi Jingwei Media Co., Ltd; Chengdu Guoshi Jingwei Media Co., Ltd; Tibet Audio-Video Publishing House	Flash			February 19, 2015	80 minutes
Xi You Xin Chuan 2: Zhen Xin Hua Da Mao Xian	China	Chang Liu					July 3, 2015	80 minutes
Yoko and His Friends	Spain; Russia	Iñigo Berasategui, Alexey Medvedev, Juanjo Elordi, Rishat Gilmetdinov	Dibulitoon Studio(es); Somuga; Wizart Animation; Yokoren Kluba	Computer			September 13, 2015	80 minutes
Yowamushi Pedal Re: ROAD	Japan	Osamu Nabeshima	TMS/8PAN	Traditional			June 12, 2015	89 minutes
Yowamushi Pedal: The Movie	Japan	Norihiro Naganuma	TMS/8PAN	Traditional			August 28, 2015	90 minutes

== Highest-grossing animated films ==
The following is a list of the 10 highest-grossing animated feature films first released in 2015.

Rank	Title	Distributor/Studio	Worldwide gross	Ref.
1	Minions	Universal Pictures / Illumination Entertainment	$1,159,398,397	
2	Inside Out	Walt Disney Pictures / Pixar Animation Studios	$857,611,174	
3	Hotel Transylvania 2	Columbia Pictures / Sony Pictures Animation	$473,226,958	
4	Home	20th Century Fox / DreamWorks Animation	$386,041,607	
5	The Good Dinosaur	Walt Disney Pictures / Pixar Animation Studios	$333,771,037	
6	The SpongeBob Movie: Sponge Out of Water	Paramount Pictures / Paramount Animation / Nickelodeon Movies	$325,186,032	
7	The Peanuts Movie	20th Century Fox / Blue Sky Studios	$250,091,610	
8	Monkey King: Hero Is Back	United Entertainment Partners	$153,020,000	
9	Shaun the Sheep Movie	StudioCanal / Aardman Animations	$110,646,093	
10	The Little Prince	Paramount Pictures / Onyx Films, Orange Studio, LPPTV, ON Entertainment	$102,028,919	

Minions became the first non-Disney animated film and the third animated film after Toy Story 3 (2010) and Frozen (2013) to gross over $1 billion, and is currently the fourth highest-grossing animated film of all time, the 20th highest-grossing film of all time and the highest-grossing film produced by Illumination. Inside Out is currently the 17th highest-grossing animated film of all time. Monkey King: Hero Is Back is currently the third highest-grossing fully Chinese animated film of all time.

== See also ==
- List of animated television series of 2015
