= Oh My School! =

2023 animated film

- International theatrical release poster
- Directed by: Mingze Xia, Kai Yan
- Written by: Yuheng Gao, Feng Jiang, Mingze Xia
- Starring: Xing Yuanyuan, Wang Bowen, Yuheng Gao, Huang Heng, Guo Hongjin
- Production company: Jilin Ningyu Animation
- Distributed by: Beijing Enlight Pictures
- Release date: 14 July 2023 (China)
- Running time: 91 minutes
- Country: China
- Language: Mandarin
- Box office: $52.6 million

Oh My School! (Chinese: 茶啊二中; pinyin: Chá Ā Èr Zhōng) is a 2023 Chinese animated comedy drama film directed by Mingze Xia and Kai Yan. The film features the voices of Xing Yuanyuan, Wang Bowen, Yuheng Gao, Huang Heng, Guo Hongjin.

== Plot ==
Unexpectedly, "irritable class teacher" Shi Miaona and junior high school class 3's most irresponsible "rascal" Wang Qiang swapped bodies. Wang Qiang, who was persecuted for a long time, defeated the habit of being a class instructor, and Shi Miaona also suffered the taste of being a "ball of mud". Xi Miaona's public class competition is approaching, and the two desperately need to figure out how to trade their bodies, yet they face various obstacles.

== Voice cast ==
- Xing Yuanyuan as Wang Qiang
- Wang Bowen as Shi Miaona
- Yuheng Gao as Jia Chun and Zhang Yan
- Huang Heng as Liu Ruolin
- Guo Hongjin as Ma Zenping

== Production ==
The film is an adaptation of a network animation series set in a junior high school in Changchun, Northeast China that ran between 2014 and 2018.

== Release ==
The film was released in China on July 14, 2023.

== Reception ==
Douban, the influential Chinese film reviews website, gave the drama 8 out of 10 points, one of the highest for wide-release animated films, second only to Chang'an.

== Box office ==
“Oh My School” debuted fifth in China and tenth in the global box-office charts with an opening weekend gross of $12.8 million. The film grossed $52.6 million in its life time.

== See also ==
- List of Chinese animated films
- List of Chinese animated series
