= Jiang Ziya (film) =

2020 Chinese animated fantasy adventure film

- Theatrical release poster
- Chinese: 姜子牙
- Hanyu Pinyin: Jiāng Zǐyá
- Directed by: Cheng Teng; Li Wei
- Screenplay by: Xie Xiying
- Based on: Investiture of the Gods by Xu Zhonglin
- Produced by: Wang Jing; Gao Weihua
- Starring: Zheng Xi; Yang Ning; Tutehameng; Yan Meme; Ji Guanlin; Jiang Guangtao
- Music by: Raymond Wong
- Production companies: Coloroom Pictures; Zhongchuan Hedao; Chengdu Coco Cartoon
- Distributed by: Beijing Enlight Pictures
- Release date: 1 October 2020
- Running time: 110 minutes
- Country: China
- Language: Mandarin
- Box office: $243.8 million

Jiang Ziya (Chinese: 姜子牙; pinyin: Jiāng Zǐyá, sometimes spelt as Jiang Zi Ya) is a 2020 Chinese animated fantasy adventure film directed by Cheng Teng and Li Wei. Featuring the mythological and fictional version of the popular Chinese figure Jiang Ziya, the plot is loosely based on the 16th-century novel Investiture of the Gods by Xu Zhonglin. It is a follow-up to Ne Zha (2019).

The film was initially scheduled for release in China on 25 January 2020, but following the COVID-19 pandemic all Chinese New Year releases were cancelled. The new release date was on 1 October 2020. The film's official English title in China is Legend of Deification (an alternative translation of Investiture of the Gods), and it is released as Jiang Ziya: Legend of Deification in the United Kingdom, Australia, New Zealand, and Singapore. The film grossed over $243 million worldwide, becoming the eighth-highest-grossing film of 2020, and received positive reviews from critics.

== Plot ==
After a fox spirit causes the downfall of the Shang dynasty, a war is waged across the three realms. Eventually, the fox spirit is captured. Jiang Ziya, a mortal who has become renowned via the war, is given the job of executing it. During the execution, the fox spirit shows Jiang Ziya that there is a young girl inside of her, and that going through with the execution would kill the girl as well. Jiang Ziya hesitates to continue the process but seemingly kills the fox spirit after it tries to escape. Unwilling to accept that the girl was supposedly an illusion created by the fox spirit, Jiang Ziya is stripped of his powers and banished to the North Sea until he can correct his mind.

Jiang spends ten years on earth despondent with his friend Shen Gongbao and his pet, Si Bu Xiang. Jiang encounters Xiao Jiu, an amnesiac young fox spirit who resembles the girl he saw during the fox spirit's execution. After a scuffle over a map, Jiang Ziya decides to accompany her to Youdu Mountain, where she believes her father is waiting for her, trailed by Shen Gongbao. During the journey, Jiang Ziya fights numerous dark demons – both evil fox spirits and the souls of the lost. At Youdu mountain, Xiao Jiu encounters King Zhou, who explains that she is tied to the original fox spirit and must be killed in order to fully defeat the former. Upon hearing this, Jiang Ziya attempts to kill her but inadvertently summons the fox spirit. She explains that the girl was Su Daji and was abandoned by her father to be given as a concubine.

Jiang Ziya along with Shen Gongbao manage to fight off the fox spirit together, at the cost of the death of Si Bu Xiang. Shen Gongbao decides to sacrifice some of his power to spirit Jiang to the heavens, so he may speak to the Master, Yuanshi Tianzun. The Master explains that Jiang Ziya wasn't denied godhood because he didn't kill the fox clan leader but because he was willing to risk the fate of the world to save the girl. Jiang Ziya convinces the Master to let him guide the girl to reincarnation, which would kill the fox spirit.

Jiang Ziya takes Xiao Jiu to the Gate of Reincarnation, the fox spirit being held back by Shen Gongbao – however, the fox spirit manages to get past him and attack the gate. As the fox spirit regains her power, she explains to Jiang Ziya that originally, she had been promised godhood but had instead been turned into a scapegoat to fight against to unite the three realms. Jiang Ziya also saw the truth, which was what the fox spirit said: "the so called 'Gate of Reincarnation' was actually a abyss locking up innocent souls from the wars." The fact that Jiang Ziya had helped the girl to enter the abyss means that she is locked in the abyss. Jiang Ziya attempts to save the girl, and was successful in breaking her lock, while the Master sends a guillotine to kill her. Jiang Ziya realises his true powers come from his self-confidence and not the will of heaven, and manages to seemingly save the girl, only for her to be killed by the guillotine. The Heavens applaud Jiang Ziya for killing the fox spirit and once again ask him to ascend to godhood. Realizing how corrupt Heaven truly is, Jiang Ziya destroys the bridge between the human and heavenly realms, severing the hold between the two.

Years later, Shen Gongbao tells the story of Jiang Ziya to a disciple, framing him as a true hero above all others. A young girl and a dog, reincarnations of Xiao Jiu, and Si Bu Xiang respectively, play together.

In a mid-credits scene, three gods are posted to guard a heavenly prison. In another, Jiang Ziya has dinner with the characters of Ne Zha.

== Cast ==
- Zheng Xi as Jiang Ziya
- Yang Ning as Xiao Jiu / Su Daji
- Tutehameng as Shen Gongbao
- Yan Meme as Si Bu Xiang
- Ji Guanlin and Shan Xin as the Jiuwei / Demon Queen
- Jiang Guangtao as Yuanshi Tianzun

== Production ==
=== Inspiration ===
The film tells the story of the mythological and fictional literary version of Jiang Ziya from the Investiture of the Gods, a gargantuan Ming-dynasty (1368–1644) shenmo novel that is traditionally attributed to Xu Zhonglin, and incorporates various existing myths into a wider narrative. Jiang Ziya is traditionally depicted in Chinese fiction as a Taoist adept in Chinese folk religion and Taoism. In this film, Jiang Ziya is portrayed as a middle-aged man who insists on following his heart despite having a complex past.

== Release ==
On 12 December 2019, the producers released their first trailer.

Due to the COVID-19 pandemic, the film's mainland Chinese release date was changed from 25 January 2020 to 1 October 2020.

The film was released on that date simultaneously in China, the United States, Canada, the United Kingdom, Australia, New Zealand, and Singapore.

== Reception ==
=== Box office ===
In China, pre-sale tickets totaled up to 90 million yuan (US$13.3 million). In just eight hours since its release, the film has grossed a total of 297 million yuan (US$43.7 million). The film surpassed its predecessor, Ne Zha (144 million yuan, or US$21.2 million) to become the highest grossing animated film opening day in China (308 million yuan, US$45.4 million). the film legged out fairly well, dropping to $303 million CNY on its second day, and $115 million CNY by its fifth, ending up with $1.037 billion CNY by the end of its first week. The film ended up with $1.6 billion CNY (US$240 million), making it the eight highest-grossing film of 2020, the second highest-grossing animated film of that year behind Demon Slayer: Kimetsu no Yaiba – The Movie: Mugen Train and the second highest-grossing Chinese animated film ever until it was surpassed by Chang'an in 2023.

=== Critical response ===
On review aggregator website Rotten Tomatoes, the film holds an approval rating of 83% based on six reviews, with an average rating of 6.3/10.

The film holds a 6.6 and an 8.3 out of 10 on aggregator sites Douban and Maoyan respectively.
