= Royal Blood & Mafia Knight =

- series poster
- Genre: Drama
- Original language: English
- No. of seasons: 1
- No. of episodes: 52

Production
- Running time: 2–3 minutes
- Production company: emouniverse.us.a

Original release
- Network: TikTok
- Release: August 2026

Royal Blood & Mafia Knight (Chinese: 王子的黑手党骑士) is an AI-generated boys' love short drama series released online in August 2026. The story follows Arian Conti, the godfather of the Sicilian Conti family, and Prince Caleb Whitmore, whose relationship develops amid conflicts involving the mafia and the British royal family.

== Plot ==
Arian Conti, a powerful mafia godfather, becomes involved in protecting Prince Caleb Whitmore. Their relationship develops from a dangerous alliance into a romantic relationship while they face threats connected to the Conti family, the British royal family and their rivals.

== Characters ==
- Arian Conti is the godfather of the Sicilian Conti family and one of the two protagonists.
- Caleb Whitmore is a British prince and Arian's romantic partner.
- Andrew Whitmore is a member of the Whitmore family and a supporting character.
- Valentina Caruso is a supporting character connected to the series' central conflict.

== Release and reception ==
Maoyan lists the series under its Chinese title with the English title Royal Blood & Mafia Knight, categorizing it as drama, romance and short film, with a date of 1 August 2026. The series attracted discussion on Bilibili, Reddit and Chinese social-media platforms, particularly for its AI-generated visuals and its romance between Arian and Caleb.
