= Legend of the Moles: The Treasure of Scylla =

- Directed by: Liu Kexin
- Written by: Liu Kexin
- Release date: July 5, 2012
- Running time: 95 minutes
- Country: China
- Language: Mandarin

Legend of the Moles: The Treasure of Scylla (Chinese: 摩尔庄园2海妖宝藏) is a 2012 Chinese animated film.

== See also ==
- Legend of the Moles: The Frozen Horror (2011)
- Legend of the Moles – The Magic Train Adventure (2015)
