= Beijing Enlight Pictures =

Chinese film production company

- Native name: 北京光线影业有限公司
- Type: Subsidiary
- Industry: Film
- Founded: 2004
- Headquarters: Beijing, China
- Products: Films
- Owner: Beijing Enlight Media
- Parent: Beijing Enlight Media

Beijing Enlight Pictures Co., Ltd. is a Chinese film production company. In 2014, the company was the third largest film distributor in China, with 7.75% of the market. Beijing Enlight Pictures is a subsidiary of Beijing Enlight Media.

Beijing Enlight Pictures Co., Ltd.
- Simplified Chinese: 北京光线影业有限公司
- Traditional Chinese: 北京光線影業有限公司
Transcriptions

== History ==
The company was founded in 2004 as a film production company. In 2000s and early 2010s, the company was famous for producing low budgeted movies. Due to the lack of representative works, the company often referred to as "any movie produced by Beijing Enlight Pictures is definitely a bad movie".

In 2012, the low budgeted Lost in Thailand became a local hit of China and the company's first hit movie. In 2015, the broadcasting rights of Hollywood Adventures, The Left Ear and Lost in Hong Kong were acquired by Star Chinese Movies. In 2016, The Mermaid became another hit movie of the company and once became the highest-grossing film of all-time at the Chinese box office.

The company has been interested in animation film production since early years. In 2009, the company anticipated in investing in the animated film Astro Boy. In 2015, after the success of the domestic animated film Monkey King: Hero Is Back, Beijing Enlight Pictures established a wholly owned subsidiary Coloroom Pictures to invest and distribute animated films. In the following years, it is considered to have formed the three major animation film studios with Light Chaser and Fantawild. In 2023, their total market share exceeds 50% in Chinese animated film box office. Enlight Pictures' main works include the Big Fish and Begonia, Deep Sea, Ne Zha and Jiang Ziya. In 2025, their animated film, Ne Zha 2, became the highest-grossing animated film of all time – as well as the highest grossing non-English film.

== Filmography ==
Including co-productions.

- Triangle (2007 film)
- Flash Point (2007)
- Missing (2008)
- All About Women (2008)
- All's Well, Ends Well 2009 (2009)
- All's Well End's Well Too 2010 (2010)
- City Under Siege (2010)
- Legend of the Fist (2010)
- The Detective 2 (2011)
- Mural (2011)
- Sleepwalker (2011)
- Speed Angels (2011)
- New Perfect Two (2012)
- An Inaccurate Memoir (2012)
- The Four (2012)
- Beijing Blues (2012)
- Sad Fairy Tale (2012)
- The Assassins (2012)
- The Last Tycoon (2012)
- Lost in Thailand (2012)
- Mid-Night Train (2013)
- The Chef, the Actor, the Scoundrel (2013)
- So Young (2013)
- Badges of Fury (2013)
- Balala the Fairies: The Magic Trial (2014)
- Armor Hero Atlas (2014)
- Where Are We Going, Dad? (2014)
- My Old Classmate (2014)
- The Four III (2014)
- The Breakup Guru (2014)
- Triumph in the Skies (2015)
- Snow Girl and the Dark Crystal (2015)
- The Left Ear (2015)
- Hollywood Adventures (2015)
- Balala the Fairies:The Mystery Note (2015)
- The Witness (2015)
- Mojin: The Lost Legend (2015)
- Lost in Hong Kong (2015)
- The Mermaid (2016)
- Yesterday Once More (2016)
- Buddies in India (2016)
- Big Fish & Begonia (2016)
- Throne of Elves (2016)
- Crying Out In Love (2016)
- I Belonged to You (2016)
- Suspect X (2017)
- Ne Zha (2019)
- Jiang Ziya (2020)
- Endgame (2021)
- Deep Sea (2023)
- Article 20 (2024)
- Ne Zha 2 (2025); co-produced with Chengdu Coco Cartoon, Beijing Enlight Pictures, Chengdu Zizai Jingjie Culture Media and Beijing Coloroom Technology
- Shaolin Temple remake (TBA)
- Black Jack film (TBA)
- All Wishes Come True! (2026 film)
