= Dahufa =

- Film poster
- Chinese: 大护法
- Directed by: Bu Sifan
- Produced by: Angie Lam
- Starring: Xiao Liansha; Feng Sheng; King Shih-Chieh; Zhang Youwu; Guan Xiaotong
- Music by: Yang Rui
- Production companies: Beijing Enlight Media Co., Ltd.; Tianjin Nice Boat Media Co., Ltd.; Horgos Caitiaowu Pictures Co., Ltd.
- Distributed by: Tianjin Maoyan Media Co., Ltd.; Beijing Enlight Media Co., Ltd.
- Release date: July 13, 2017 (China)
- Running time: 95 minutes
- Country: China
- Language: Chinese
- Budget: CNY 20 million
- Box office: US$14.4 million

Dahufa (simplified Chinese: 大护法; traditional Chinese: 大護法; pinyin: Dàhùfǎ) is a 2017 Chinese animated fantasy film. The film is directed by Bu Sifan and produced by Angie Lam. It stars voice cast of Xiao Liansha, Feng Sheng, King Shih-Chieh, and Zhang Youwu. It was the first film in China that was self-rated (Chinese: 自主分级) PG-13 by the film's producers.

== Reception ==
=== Accolades ===
Award	Category	Recipient(s) and nominee(s)	Result	Ref.
54th Golden Horse Awards	Best Animation Feature	Dahufa	Nominated	
9th China Film Director's Guild Awards	Best Film	Dahufa	Nominated	
9th China Film Director's Guild Awards	Best Director	Bu Sifan	Nominated	
9th China Film Director's Guild Awards	Best Screenwriter	Bu Sifan	Nominated	
