= Legend of the Moles: The Frozen Horror =

- Directed by: Liu Kexin
- Release date: 11 August 2011 (China)
- Running time: 95 minutes
- Country: China
- Language: Mandarin Chinese
- Box office: CNY18 million

Legend of the Moles: The Frozen Horror is a 2011 Chinese animated film.

== See also ==
- Legend of the Moles: The Treasure of Scylla (2012)
- Legend of the Moles – The Magic Train Adventure (2015)
