= List of longest animated films =

Animated feature films by running time

This is a list of the longest animated feature films with a running time of 120 minutes (2 hours) or more are included here.

This list excludes some individual animated features for which traditional narrative techniques are not applicable, or that were not intended for wide release. The longest films in experimental form are typically longer than those given a wide release.

== Individual films ==
NOTE: Some releases are extended cuts or director's cuts and are ranked according to the longest verified running time.

Rank	Title	Running time	Year released	Country	Notes
1	Gunbuster vs. Diebuster: Aim for the Top! - The Gattai!! Movie	195 min (3 hr, 15 min)	2006	Japan	Version of Gunbuster: The Movie and Diebuster: The Movie with an intermission.
2	In This Corner (and Other Corners) of the World	168 min (2 hr, 48 min)	2019	Japan	Extended cut of original version titled In This Corner of the World, with runtime of 129 min (2 hr, 9 min).
3	30,000 Miles from Chang'an	168 min (2 hr, 48 min)	2023	China	
4	Final Yamato (70 mm)	163 min (2 hr, 43 min)	1983	Japan	The 35 mm cut is 152 min (2 hr, 32 min) long.
5	The Disappearance of Haruhi Suzumiya	162 min (2 hr, 42 min)	2010	Japan	
6	The Tragedy of Man	160 min (2 hr, 40 min)	2011	Hungary	
7	Revival of Evangelion	160 min (2 hr, 40 min)	1998	Japan	A version of Evangelion: Death and Rebirth consisting of Death(True)² and The End of Evangelion with a four-minute intermission.
8	Sangokushi: The Distant Land [ja]	157 min (2 hr, 37 min)	1994	Japan	
9	Evangelion: 3.0+1.0 Thrice Upon a Time	155 min (2 hr, 35 min)	2021	Japan	
10	Demon Slayer: Kimetsu no Yaiba – The Movie: Infinity Castle	155 min (2 hr, 35 min)	2025	Japan	
11	Tomorrow's Joe: The Movie	152 min (2 hr, 32 min)	1980	Japan	Compilation of the 1970–1971 TV series.
12	Curious Tales of a Temple	152 min (2 hr, 32 min)	2025	China	
13	Farewell to Space Battleship Yamato	151 min (2 hr, 31 min)	1978	Japan	
14	Dunno on the Moon	151 min (2 hr, 31 min)	1997	Russia	
15	Magical Girl Lyrical Nanoha: The Movie 2nd A's	150 min (2 hr, 30 min)	2012	Japan	
16	Star Driver: The Movie	150 min (2 hr, 30 min)	2013	Japan	
17	Sangokushi: The Yangtze Is Burning! [ja]	149 min (2 hr, 29 min)	1993	Japan	
18	Be Forever Yamato	148 min (2 hr, 28 min)	1980	Japan	
19	Zoku Owarimonogatari	148 min (2 hr, 28 min)	2018	Japan	
20	Kizumonogatari: Koyomi Vamp	144 min (2 hr, 24 min)	2024	Japan	Compilation of the 2016–2017 film series.
21	Ne Zha 2	144 min (2 hr, 24 min)	2025	China	
22	All Wishes Come True!	144 min (2 hr, 24 min)	2026	China	
23	Cosmic Princess Kaguya!	143 min (2 hr, 23 min)	2026	Japan	
24	Re:cycle Of The Penguindrum Part 2	142 min (2 hr, 22 min)	2022	Japan	Compilation of the 2011 TV series.
25	Hello My Beautiful Creatures	142 min (2 hr, 22 min)	2024	United States	
26	Mobile Suit Gundam I	140 min (2 hr, 20 min)	1981	Japan	Compilation of the 1979–1980 TV series.
27	Mobile Suit Gundam III: Encounters in Space	140 min (2 hr, 20 min)	1982	Japan	Compilation of the 1979–1980 TV series.
27	Sangokushi: The Great Conquest (uncut) [ja]	140 min (2 hr, 20 min)	1992	Japan	
28	Violet Evergarden: The Movie	140 min (2 hr, 20 min)	2020	Japan	
29	Spider-Man: Across the Spider-Verse	140 min (2 hr, 20 min)	2023	United States	
30	Hanuman	139 min (2 hr, 19 min)	2005	India	
31	Odin: Photon Sailer Starlight	139 min (2 hr, 19 min)	1985	Japan	
32	Summer Days with Coo	138 min (2 hr, 18 min)	2007	Japan	
33	The Tale of the Princess Kaguya	137 min (2 hr, 17 min)	2013	Japan	
34	Psycho-Pass 3: First Inspector	137 min (2 hr, 17 min)	2020	Japan	
35	Three Kingdoms: The Beginning	137 min (2 hr, 17 min)	2026	China	
36	A Tree of Palme	136 min (2 hr, 16 min)	2002	Japan	
37	Welcome to the Space Show	136 min (2 hr, 16 min)	2010	Japan	
38	Consuming Spirits	136 min (2 hr, 16 min)	2012	United States	
39	The Quintessential Quintuplets Movie	136 min (2 hr, 16 min)	2022	Japan	
40	Space Battleship Yamato	135 min (2 hr, 15 min)	1977	Japan	Compilation of the 1974–1975 TV series.
41	Mobile Suit Gundam II: Soldiers of Sorrow	135 min (2 hr, 15 min)	1981	Japan	Compilation of the 1979–1980 TV series.
42	Ramayana: The Legend of Prince Rama	135 min (2 hr, 15 min)	1993	India; Japan	
43	Space Battleship Yamato: Resurrection	135 min (2 hr, 15 min)	2009	Japan	
44	Princess Mononoke	134 min (2 hr, 14 min)	1997	Japan	
45	The Lord of the Rings: The War of the Rohirrim	134 min (2 hr, 14 min)	2024	New Zealand; Japan; United States	
46	Overlord: The Sacred Kingdom	134 min (2 hr, 14 min)	2024	Japan	
47	Chaar Sahibzaade: Rise of Banda Singh Bahadur	134 min (2 hr, 14 min)	2016	India	
48	White Snake: Afloat	133 min (2 hr, 13 min)	2024	China	
49	I Am What I Am 2	133 min (2 hr, 13 min)	2024	China	
50	The Lord of the Rings	132 min (2 hr, 12 min)	1978	United Kingdom; United States	
51	Green Snake	132 min (2 hr, 12 min)	2021	China	
52	Wildwood	132 min (2 hr, 12 min)	2026	United States	The longest stop-motion feature film.
53	Galaxy Express 999	132 min (2 hr, 12 min)	1979	Japan	
54	Crusher Joe	132 min (2 hr, 12 min)	1983	Japan	
55	The Dagger of Kamui	132 min (2 hr, 12 min)	1985	Japan	
56	Harmagedon	131 min (2 hr, 11 min)	1983	Japan	
57	Yu-Gi-Oh! The Dark Side of Dimensions	131 min (2 hr, 11 min)	2016	Japan	
58	Cyborg 009: Legend of the Super Galaxy	130 min (2 hr, 10 min)	1980	Japan	
59	Adieu Galaxy Express 999	130 min (2 hr, 10 min)	1981	Japan	
60	Arcadia of My Youth	130 min (2 hr, 10 min)	1982	Japan	
61	Puella Magi Madoka Magica the Movie Part 1: Beginnings	130 min (2 hr, 10 min)	2012	Japan	Compilation of the 2011 TV series.
62	A Silent Voice	130 min (2 hr, 10 min)	2016	Japan	
63	Turn A Gundam I: Earth Light	129 min (2 hr, 9 min)	2002	Japan	Compilation of the 1999–2000 TV series.
64	A Thousand and One Nights	128 min (2 hr, 8 min)	1969	Japan	
65	I am Nightmare	128 min (2 hr, 8 min)	2014	United States	
66	Chaar Sahibzaade	128 min (2 hr, 8 min)	2014	India	
67	Odd Taxi: In the Woods	128 min (2 hr, 8 min)	2022	Japan	Compilation of the 2021 TV series.
68	New Gods: Yang Jian	128 min (2 hr, 8 min)	2022	China	
69	Turn A Gundam II: Moonlight Butterfly	127 min (2 hr, 7 min)	2002	Japan	Compilation of the 1999–2000 TV series.
70	Colorful	127 min (2 hr, 7 min)	2010	Japan	
71	Fantasia	126 min (2 hr, 6 min)	1940	United States	
72	Steamboy	126 min (2 hr, 6 min)	2004	Japan	
73	Final Fantasy VII: Advent Children Complete	126 min (2 hr, 6 min)	2009	Japan	Original cut is 100 min (1 hr, 40 min).
74	Gurren Lagann the Movie: The Lights in the Sky Are Stars	126 min (2 hr, 6 min)	2009	Japan	Compilation of the 2007 TV series.
75	The Wind Rises	126 min (2 hr, 6 min)	2013	Japan	
76	The Empire of Corpses	126 min (2 hr, 6 min)	2015	Japan	
77	Future War 198X	125 min (2 hr, 5 min)	1982	Japan	
78	Laputa: Castle in the Sky	125 min (2 hr, 5 min)	1986	Japan	
79	Spirited Away	125 min (2 hr, 5 min)	2001	Japan	
80	Akira	124 min (2 hr, 4 min)	1988	Japan	
81	Re:cycle Of The Penguindrum Part 1	124 min (2 hr, 4 min)	2022	Japan	Compilation of the 2011 TV series.
82	Kochadaiiyaan	124 min (2 hr, 4 min)	2014	India	
83	The First Slam Dunk	124 min (2 hr, 4 min)	2022	Japan	
84	The Boy and the Heron	124 min (2 hr, 4 min)	2023	Japan	
85	Slocum at Sea with Himself	123 min (2 hr, 3 min)	2015	United States	
86	Mechamato Movie	123 min (2 hr, 3 min)	2022	Malaysia	Extended cut of the original version by the same title, with runtime of 122 min (2 hr, 2 min).
87	Future Boy Conan	122 min (2 hr, 2 min)	1979	Japan	Compilation of the 1978 TV series.
88	The Sky Crawlers	122 min (2 hr, 2 min)	2008	Japan	
89	Fate/stay night: Heaven's Feel III. spring song	122 min (2 hr, 2 min)	2020	Japan	
90	Belle	122 min (2 hr, 2 min)	2021	Japan	
91	Suzume	122 min (2 hr, 2 min)	2022	Japan	
92	Three Kingdoms: Starlit Heroes	122 min (2 hr, 2 min)	2025	China	
93	Phoenix 2772	121 min (2 hr, 1 min)	1980	Japan	
94	Queen Millennia	121 min (2 hr, 1 min)	1982	Japan	
95	Royal Space Force: The Wings of Honneamise	121 min (2 hr, 1 min)	1987	Japan	
96	Heart String Marionette	121 min (2 hr, 1 min)	2012	United States; Iceland	
97	The Idolmaster Movie: Beyond the Brilliant Future!	121 min (2 hr, 1 min)	2014	Japan	
98	Witch Era	120 min (2 hr)	1984	Japan	
99	Everywhere	120 min (2 hr)	1989	Philippines	
100	Kittu	120 min (2 hr)	2006	India	
101	Macross Frontier: The False Songstress	120 min (2 hr)	2009	Japan	
102	Lava Kusa: The Warrior Twins	120 min (2 hr)	2010	India	
103	Mobile Suit Gundam 00 the Movie: A Wakening of the Trailblazer	120 min (2 hr)	2010	Japan	
104	A Letter to Momo	120 min (2 hr)	2011	Japan	
105	Girls und Panzer der Film	120 min (2 hr)	2015	Japan	
106	The Boy and the Beast	120 min (2 hr)	2015	Japan	
107	One Piece Film: Gold	120 min (2 hr)	2016	Japan	
108	Fate/stay night: Heaven's Feel I. presage flower	120 min (2 hr)	2017	Japan	
109	Sword Art Online The Movie: Ordinal Scale	120 min (2 hr)	2017	Japan	
110	Laid-Back Camp Movie	120 min (2 hr)	2022	Japan	
111	Psycho-Pass Providence	120 min (2 hr)	2023	Japan	
112	The Legend of Hei II	120 min (2 hr)	2025	China	
113	Foufu	120 min (2 hr)	2026	Indonesia	
114	Puella Magi Madoka Magica the Movie -Walpurgisnacht Rising-	120 min (2 hr)	2026	Japan	

=== Countries ===
Country		Film	Type of Distribution	Length	Release year	Other Countries	Note
China, People's Republic of	(China) Mainland	30,000 Miles from Chang'an	Theatrical	168 min (2 hr, 48 min)	2023	—N/a	
China, People's Republic of	Hong Kong	No. 7 Cherry Lane	Theatrical	125 min (2 hr, 5 min)	2019	—N/a	
China, People's Republic of	Macau	Pundusina	Theatrical	9 min (0 hr, 9 min)	2018	—N/a	
Hungary		The Tragedy of Man	Theatrical	160 min (2 hr, 40 min)	2011	—N/a	
Iceland		Heart String Marionette	Internet	121 min (2 hr, 1 min)	2012	United States	
India		Hanuman	Theatrical	139 min (2 hr, 19 min)	2005	—N/a	
Japan		Gunbuster vs. Diebuster: Aim for the Top! - The Gattai!! Movie	Theatrical	195 min (3 hr, 15 min)	2006	—N/a	Version of Gunbuster: The Movie and Diebuster: The Movie with an intermission.
Malaysia		Mechamato Movie	Theatrical	123 min (2 hr, 3 min)	2022	—N/a	Extended cut of the original version by the same title, with runtime of 122 min (2 hr, 2 min).
Mexico		Guillermo del Toro's Pinocchio	Theatrical	121 min (2 hr, 1 min)	2022	United States	
New Zealand		The Lord of the Rings: The War of the Rohirrim	Theatrical	134 min (2 hr, 14 min)	2024	Japan and United States	
Philippines
Philippines		Everywhere	Direct-to-video	120 min (2 hr)	1989	—N/a	
Philippines		The Leaving	Theatrical	105 min (1 hr, 45 min)	2018	—N/a	
Russia		Dunno on the Moon	Television	151 min (2 hr, 31 min)	1997	—N/a	
United Kingdom	England	The Lord of the Rings	Theatrical	132 min (2 hr, 12 min)	1978	United States	
United States		Hello My Beautiful Creatures	Internet	142 min (2 hr, 22 min)	2024	—N/a	
United States		Spider-Man: Across the Spider-Verse	Theatrical	140 min (2 hr, 20 min)	2023	—N/a	
Internationality		Ramayana: The Legend of Prince Rama	Theatrical	135 min (2 hr, 15 min)	1993	India and Japan	

=== Release Year ===
Release year	Film	Type of Distribution	Length	Country	Note
1916	Creation	Theatrical		United States	Lost film
1917	El Apóstol	Theatrical	70 min (1 hr, 10 min)	Argentina	Lost film
1918	Sin dejar rastros	Theatrical		Argentina	Lost film
1924	Vida y milagros de Don Fausto	Theatrical		Chile	Lost film
1926	The Adventures of Prince Achmed	Theatrical	65 min (1 hr, 5 min)	Germany	
1931	Peludópolis	Theatrical	80 min (1 hr, 20 min)	Argentina	Lost film
1935	The New Gulliver	Theatrical	75 min (1 hr, 15 min)	Soviet Union	
1936	Tischlein deck dich	Theatrical	25 min (0 hr, 25 min)	Germany	
1937	Snow White and the Seven Dwarfs	Theatrical	83 min (1 hr, 23 min)	United States	
1938	Der Wettlauf zwischen dem Hasen und dem Igel	Theatrical	17 min (0 hr, 17 min)	Germany	
1939	Gulliver's Travels	Theatrical	76 min (1 hr, 16 min)	United States	
1940	Fantasia	Theatrical	126 min (2 hr, 6 min)	United States	
1941	Mr. Bug Goes to Town	Theatrical	78 min (1 hr, 18 min)	United States	
1942	Bambi	Theatrical	69 min (1 hr, 9 min)	United States	
1943	Victory Through Air Power	Theatrical	70 min (1 hr, 10 min)	United States	
1944	Sueños de aventuras	Theatrical	84 min (1 hr, 24 min)	Spain	
1945	The Enchanted Chickpea	Theatrical	98 min (1 hr, 38 min)	Spain	
1946	Make Mine Music	Theatrical	75 min (1 hr, 15 min)	United States	
1947	The Czech Year	Theatrical	75 min (1 hr, 15 min)	United States	
1948	Wales	Theatrical	85 min (1 hr, 25 min)	United Kingdom	
1949	I fratelli Dinamite	Theatrical	85 min (1 hr, 25 min)	Italy	
1950	Érase una vez	Theatrical	90 min (1 hr, 30 min)	Spain	
1951	Flu-ing Squad	Theatrical	90 min (1 hr, 30 min)	United Kingdom	
1952	A Treasure of Bird Island	Theatrical	75 min (1 hr, 15 min)	Czechoslovakia	
1953	Old Czech Legends	Theatrical	91 min (1 hr, 31 min)	Czechoslovakia	
1954	Kaspers Reise zu den Zwergen	Theatrical	87 (1 hr, 27 min)	West Germany	
1955	Jubilej gospodina Ikla	Theatrical	77 min (1 hr, 17 min)	Yugoslavia	
1956	The Animal World	Theatrical	82 min (1 hr, 22 min)	United States	
1957	The Snow Queen	Theatrical	68 min (1 hr, 8 min)	Soviet Union	
1958	The Deadly Invention	Theatrical	84 min (1 hr, 24 min)	Czechoslovakia	
1959	The Boy Sarutobi Sasuke	Theatrical	83 min (1 hr, 23 min)	Japan	
1960	Journey to the West	Theatrical	88 min (1 hr, 28 min)	Japan	
1961	Uproar in Heaven	Theatrical	114 min (1 hr, 54 min)	China	
1962	Gay Purr-ee	Theatrical	85 min (1 hr, 25 min)	United States	
1963	The Little Prince and the Eight-Headed Dragon	Theatrical	86 min (1 hr, 26 min)	Japan	
1964	Hey There, It's Yogi Bear	Theatrical	89 min (1 hr, 29 min)	United States	
1965	Willy McBean and His Magic Machine	Theatrical	94 min (1 hr, 34 min)	Japan, United States, Canada	
1966	The Daydreamer	Theatrical	101 min (1 hr, 41 min)	United States, Japan, Canada	
1967	Ninja bugei-chô	Theatrical	123 min (2 hr, 3 min)	Japan	
1968	Putiferio va alla guerra	Theatrical	91 min (1 hr, 31 min)	Italy	
1969	A Thousand and One Nights	Theatrical	128 min (2 hr, 8 min)	Japan	
1970	Cleopatra: Queen of Sex	Theatrical	112 min (1 hr, 52 min)	Japan	
1971	Yasuji no Pornorama – Yacchimae!!	Theatrical	101 min (1 hr, 41 min)	Japan	
1972	Vozes do Medo	Theatrical	135 min (2 hr, 15 min)	Brazil	
1973	Charlotte's Web	Theatrical	94 min (1 hr, 34 min)	United States	
1974	Coonskin	Theatrical	100 min (1 hr, 40 min)	United States	
1975	The Story of Heidi	Theatrical	93 min (1 hr, 33 min)	Japan	
1976	Guitar Picks & Roach Clips	Theatrical	90 min (1 hr, 30 min)	United States	
1977	Space Battleship Yamato	Theatrical	135 min (2 hr, 15 min)	Japan	Compilation of the 1974–1975 TV series.
1978	Farewell to Space Battleship Yamato	Theatrical	151 min (2 hr, 31 min)	Japan	
1979	Galaxy Express 999	Theatrical	132 min (2 hr, 12 min)	Japan	
1980	Tomorrow's Joe: The Movie	Theatrical	152 min (2 hr, 32 min)	Japan	Compilation of the 1970–1971 TV series.
1981	Mobile Suit Gundam I	Theatrical	140 min (2 hr, 20 min)	Japan	Compilation of the 1979–1980 TV series.
1982	Mobile Suit Gundam III: Encounters in Space	Theatrical	140 min (2 hr, 20 min)	Japan	Compilation of the 1979–1980 TV series.
1983	Final Yamato (70 mm)	Theatrical	163 min (2 hr, 43 min)	Japan	The 35 mm cut is 152 min (2 hr, 32 min) long.
1984	Witch Era	Theatrical	120 min (2 hr)	Japan	
1985	Odin: Photon Sailer Starlight	Theatrical	139 min (2 hr, 19 min)	Japan	
1986	Laputa: Castle in the Sky	Theatrical	125 min (2 hr, 5 min)	Japan	
1987	Royal Space Force: The Wings of Honnêamise	Theatrical	121 min (2 hr, 1 min)	Japan	
1988	Akira	Theatrical	124 min (2 hr, 4 min)	Japan	
1989	Bouken Shite mo Ii Koro	Direct-to-Video	135 min (2 hr, 15 min)	Japan	
1990	Go!! Karate Club	Direct-to-Video	200 min (3 hr, 20 min)	Japan	
1991	Trusty Ginjiro	Direct-to-Video	135 min (2 hr, 15 min)	Japan	
1992	Sangokushi: The Great Conquest (uncut)	Theatrical	140 min (2 hr, 20 min)	Japan	
1993	Sangokushi: The Yangtze Is Burning	Theatrical	149 min (2 hr, 29 min)	Japan	
1994	Sangokushi: The Distant Land	Theatrical	157 min (2 hr, 37 min)	Japan	
1995	Jonny Quest Versus the Cyber Insects	Television	120 min (2 hr)	United States	
1997	Dunno on the Moon	Television	151 min (2 hr, 31 min)	Russia	
1998	Revival of Evangelion	Theatrical	163 min (2 hr, 43 min)	Japan	A version of Evangelion: Death and Rebirth consisting of Death(True)² and The End of Evangelion with a four-minute intermission.
1999	Around the World in 80 Days	Direct-to-Video	181 min (3 hr, 1 min)	Canada, United States	
2000	The Seal of Nehahra	Web	235 min (3 hr, 55 min)	United States	
2001	Spirited Away	Theatrical	125 min (2 hr, 5 min)	Japan	
2002	A Tree of Palme	Theatrical	136 min (2 hr, 16 min)	Japan	
2003	Pardon aux familles... Tout ça!	Direct-to-Video	160 min (2 hr, 40 min)	France	
2004	Steamboy	Theatrical	126 min (2 hr, 6 min)	Japan	
2005	Hanuman	Theatrical	139 min (2 hr, 19 min)	India	
2007	Summer Days with Coo	Theatrical	138 min (2 hr, 18 min)	Japan	
2008	The Sky Crawlers	Theatrical	122 min (2 hr, 2 min)	Japan	
2009	Space Battleship Yamato: Resurrection	Theatrical	135 min (2 hr, 15 min)	Japan	
2010	The Disappearance of Haruhi Suzumiya	Theatrical	162 min (2 hr, 42 min)	Japan	
2011	The Tragedy of Man	Theatrical	160 min (2 hr, 40 min)	Hungary	
2012	Magical Girl Lyrical Nanoha: The Movie 2nd A's	Theatrical	150 min (2 hr, 30 min)	Japan	
2013	Star Driver: The Movie	Theatrical	150 min (2 hr, 30 min)	Japan	
2014	I am Nightmare	Theatrical	128 min (2 hr, 8 min)	United States	
2015	The Empire of Corpses	Theatrical	126 min (2 hr, 6 min)	Japan	
2016	Chaar Sahibzaade: Rise of Banda Singh Bahadur	Theatrical	134 min (2 hr, 14 min)	India	
2017	Fate/stay night: Heaven's Feel I. presage flower	Theatrical	120 min (2 hr)	Japan	
2018	Disappeared Quipu	Theatrical	490 min (8hr, 10 min)	United States	
2019	In This Corner (and Other Corners) of the World	Theatrical	168 min (2 hr, 48 min)	Japan	Extended cut of original version titled In This Corner of the World, with runtime of 129 min (2 hr, 9 min).
2020	Violet Evergarden: The Movie	Theatrical	140 min (2 hr, 20 min)	Japan	
2021	Evangelion: 3.0+1.0 Thrice Upon a Time	Theatrical	155 min (2 hr, 35 min)	Japan	
2022	Re:cycle Of The Penguindrum Part 2	Theatrical	142 min (2 hr, 22 min)	Japan	Compilation of the 2011 TV series.
2023	30,000 Miles from Chang'an	Theatrical	168 min (2 hr, 48 min)	China	
2024	Kizumonogatari: Koyomi Vamp	Theatrical	144 min (2 hr, 24 min)	Japan	Compilation of the 2016–2017 film series.
2025	Demon Slayer: Kimetsu no Yaiba – The Movie: Infinity Castle	Theatrical	155 min (2 hr, 35 min)	Japan	
2026	All Wishes Come True!	Theatrical	144 min (2 hr, 24 min)	China	

== Films released in separate parts ==
This section lists films conceived as an artistic unity and produced simultaneously, or consecutively with no significant interruption or change of production team, despite being released with separate premieres.

Title	No. of films	Running time	Year released	Country	Notes
Digimon Adventure tri.	6	531 min (8 hr, 51 min)	2015–18	Japan	
Rebuild of Evangelion	4	464 min (7 hr, 44 min)	2007–21	Japan	
Sangokushi [ja]	3	440 min (7 hr, 20 min)	1992–94	Japan	
Mobile Suit Gundam	3	416 min (6 hr, 56 min)	1981–82	Japan	Compilation of the 1979–1980 TV series.
Fate/stay night: Heaven’s Feel	3	359 min (5 hr, 59 min)	2017–20	Japan	
Puella Magi Madoka Magica the Movie	3	356 min (5 hr, 56 min)	2012–13	Japan	First two films are a compilation of the 2011 TV series.
Justice League: Crisis on Infinite Earths	3	285 min (4 hr, 45 min)	2024	United States	
Kizumonogatari	3	216 min (3 hr, 36 min)	2016–17	Japan	A compilation film, entitled Kizumonogatari: Koyomi Vamp, released in 2024 with a runtime of 144 min (2 hr, 24 min)
Pokémon the Movie: Black—Victini and Reshiram and White—Victini and Zekrom	2	190 min (3 hr, 10 min)	2011	Japan	
Psycho-Pass: Sinners of the System	3	188 min (3 hr, 8 min)	2019	Japan	
Watchmen	2	173 min (2 hr, 53 min)	2024	United States	
Batman: The Long Halloween	2	172 min (2 hr, 52 min)	2021	United States	Both parts were later reissued as a deluxe edition, edited together as one whole film.
The Death and Return of Superman	2	168 min (2 hr, 48 min)	2018–19	The Death of Superman and Reign of the Supermen were later reissued in a limited edition gift set, edited together as one whole film.	
Pretty Guardian Sailor Moon Eternal The Movie	2	160 min (2 hr, 40 min)	2021	Japan	
Pretty Guardian Sailor Moon Cosmos The Movie	2	160 min (2 hr, 40 min)	2023	Japan	
Batman: The Dark Knight Returns	2	152 min (2 hr, 32 min)	2012–13	United States	Both parts were later reissued as a deluxe edition, edited together as one whole film.
Wishology!	3	135 min (2 hr, 15 min)	2009	United States	Episodes 95–100 of The Fairly OddParents, with each part split into 2 separate episodes, taking 6 production numbers.

=== Countries ===
Country	Film	No. of Parts	Type of Distribution	Length	Release year	Other Countries	Note
Japan	Digimon Adventure tri.	6	Theatrical, Direct-to-Video	531 min (8 hr, 51 min)	2015–18	—N/a	
United States	Justice League: Crisis on Infinite Earths	3	Internet, Direct-to-Streaming	285 min (4 hr, 45 min)	2024	—N/a	

== See also ==
- List of longest films
- Lists of animated films

== Works cited ==
- Galbraith IV, Stuart (2008). The Toho Studios Story: A History and Complete Filmography. Scarecrow Press. ISBN 9781461673743.
