= Tale of the Rally =

- Directed by: Zheng Chongxin
- Release date: September 6, 2014
- Running time: 82 minutes
- Country: China
- Language: Mandarin
- Box office: US$1.46 million (China)

Tale of the Rally (Chinese: 龟兔再跑) is a 2014 Chinese animated family comedy film directed by Zheng Chongxin. It was released on September 6, 2014.

== Voice cast ==
- Zhang Lin
- Yan Yanzi
- Li Tuan
- Zu Qing
- Liu Hongyun
- Deng Yuting
- Zhao Na
- Gao Quansheng

== Box office ==
The film has earned US$1.46 million at the Chinese box office.
