= Fishing Child =

- Directed by: Wan Guchan
- Distributed by: Shanghai Animation Film Studio
- Release date: 1959
- Running time: 30 mins
- Country: China
- Language: Mandarin

Fishing Child (Chinese: 渔童) is a Chinese animated featurette short produced by the Shanghai Animation Film Studio. It is also referred to as "Fisher Boy".

== Translation ==
The title in Chinese is closely translated to "Yu Tong" or the Fishing Bowl. The story supposedly takes place after the Opium War when the imperialists occupied China's sea port.

== Story ==
An old fisherman who usually earns a living by fishing at the river risk of his own life to find this white jade fish-jar. On the fish-jar is engraved a tiny fisher boy. The fisher boy can become alive and grow and, with his fishing-rod, can hook the fish which are engraved on the bottom part of the fish-globe and which also can become alive and grow. The old man is later accused of stealing the fish jar from the pastor.
