= Deep Sea (film) =

- Promotional release poster
- 深海
- Directed by: Tian Xiaopeng
- Written by: Tian Xiaopeng
- Screenplay by: Tian Xiaopeng
- Produced by: Qiao Yi
- Starring: Tingwen Wang (王亭文); Xin Su (苏鑫); Kuixing Teng; Ting Yang; Jing Ji; Taochen Fang
- Cinematography: Mazhiyuan Cheng
- Edited by: An'er Lin
- Music by: Mao Buyi; Tang Hanxiao; MIUMIU
- Production companies: October Media; Coloroom Pictures
- Release date: 22 January 2023 (China)
- Running time: 105 minutes
- Country: China
- Language: Standard Chinese
- Budget: 200 million RMB
- Box office: US$136.1 million

Deep Sea (Chinese: 深海; pinyin: Shēnhǎi) is a 2023 Chinese 3D animated fantasy film, written and directed by Tian Xiaopeng, who previously directed Monkey King: Hero Is Back, co-produced by his company October Media and Coloroom Pictures.

== Plot ==
A young girl explores a strange underwater environment. Shenxiu, a little girl whose parents were recently divorced goes on a sea trip with her new family. Still not having dealt with not having her mother around, she hears a hum similar to a song her mother used to sing and by following the sound she enters the fantastical Deep Sea Restaurant, a chaotic, submarine-style eatery run by Nanhe, a manic and gold-obsessed chef and crewed by sea animals serving humanoid fish. In reality, during a violent storm at sea, she believes she hears her mother’s voice calling to her from the ocean.

Nanhe is initially hostile toward Shenxiu because her sadness attracts the "Red Phantom," a suffocating, shroud-like entity that destroys everything in its path. However, after realizing the Hyjinx can produce a magical soup ingredient, Nanhe agrees to take Shenxiu to the "Deep Sea Eye" to find her mother in exchange for her help in the kitchen.

As they journey, Shenxiu and Nanhe form a deep bond. Nanhe, despite his abrasive and greedy exterior, reveals himself to be a fellow social outcast who uses humor and theatrics to mask his own hardships. He encourages Shenxiu to fight her depression and to find the strength to smile even when life is difficult. When they eventually reach the Deep Sea Eye, the Red Phantom launches a final, overwhelming attack. Nanhe uses all his strength and magical energy to tear open the Eye, sacrificing himself to ensure Shenxiu reaches the center.

It is revealed that the underwater world was a subconscious hallucination. In reality, Shenxiu had fallen into the ocean during the storm, and Nanhe, in reality a struggling street performer who was selling books on the cruise ship, had jumped in to save her. They spent hours adrift in the freezing water clinging to a life buoy. To keep Shenxiu conscious and motivated to stay alive, Nanhe told her the fantastical stories that formed the basis of her dream.

In the final sequence, Shenxiu stands in a white void between life and death. She sees Nanhe one last time; though she tearfully begs to stay with him, he pushes her back toward the light, urging her to live. By the time the two are spotted and pulled from the water by a rescue team, Nanhe has exhausted himself and succumbed to the extreme cold. Shenxiu eventually wakes up in a hospital, surrounded by her family.

== Original voice cast ==
- Su Xin as Nanhe
- Wang Tingwen (王亭文) as Shenxiu
- Teng Kuixing
- Yang Ting
- Ji Jing (吉静)
- Fang Taochen (方韬辰)
- Dong Yi (董一)

== Behind the scenes ==
=== Development and casting ===
Tian Xiaopeng spent seven years developing Deep Sea, conceiving it as a highly personal exploration of an ordinary, vulnerable protagonist rather than relying on traditional Chinese mythological intellectual properties.The character of Shenxiu was designed to capture the inner struggle of individuals dealing with loneliness, depression, and a people-pleasing personality, while Nanhe represents ordinary, unsung heroes. To maintain authenticity, Tian required the voice actors to match the ages of their characters. The vocal recording and facial expression mapping took five years, using a "recording during performance" methodology where actors' raw emotional delivery was emphasized over standard isolated voice booth recording. When the original young actress for Shenxiu underwent voice changes during puberty, open auditions were held to recast the role.

=== Visual effects and technology ===
The film is the first in Chinese animation history to develop and utilize "ink-wash particle" technology (Chinese: 粒子水墨), which took two years of dedicated research and development. This technique mapped billions of digital particles to replicate the traditional flowing, outline-free gradients of Chinese ink-wash paintings within a three-dimensional space. Animators worked under highly rigorous standards; each office was equipped with mirrors so animators could monitor their own facial muscles for reference. The production involved over a thousand special effects shots, making up nearly 70% of the runtime. The complex "splitting the sea" sequence alone required over a hundred layered particle effects, taking 15 months to complete. Production was delayed by various logistical issues, including severe regional torrential rains that flooded the studio's mainframes.

=== Animation details ===
- The character "Youcai," the cashier feline at the Deep Sea Restaurant, was modeled after one of the 87 stray cats cared for by the production staff in the surrounding studio park.
- The film features over 80 fluffy sea otters. To capture realistic physiological movements, production crew members recorded themselves performing physical prompts to serve as spatial references for the animation rigs.

== Theme interpretation ==
Critics and scholars have noted that Deep Sea utilizes a complex narrative structure to address pressing contemporary social issues, specifically childhood trauma within restructured or dysfunctional families and youth depression. The narrative utilizes a dual framework where a dazzling, highly saturated fantasy environment serves as a psychological manifestation of the protagonist's repressed real-world trauma. This visual aesthetic, characterized by extreme color contrasts and vibrant hues, intentionally subverts traditional cinematic depictions of the deep sea as dark or terrifying, transforming it instead into a refuge of subconscious comfort.

== Music ==
The film's score was composed by Dou Peng over a three-year period from December 2019 to December 2022, and recorded by a 100-piece symphony orchestra. Renowned cellist Wang Jian was invited to provide featured solos for pivotal emotional sequences. The prominent musical interlude, "Little White Boat", is a traditional Korean children's song originally written to express grief over lost loved ones and displacement. Although its usage in the 2020 suspense series The Bad Kids gave the song an ominous association in Chinese pop culture, the creative team spent a year securing international copyright clearances because its original melancholic themes directly mirrored the thematic narrative arc of Shenxiu and Nanhe.

== Box office ==
Prior to theatrical release, market analysts predicted intense competition for the film due to its scheduling during the competitive Cninese New Year window alongside blockbusters such as Zhang Yimou's Full River Red and the sci-fi epic The Wandering Earth 2. Released on January 22, 2023, Deep Sea initially experienced lower-than-expected commercial returns, grossing 31.84 million RMB on its second day and opening in fifth place. The film's challenging themes of depression and domestic estrangement initially polarized festive audiences, drawing mixed early reactions on platforms like Sina Weibo. However, bolstered by positive critical word-of-mouth, the box office rebounded by its third week, tracking an upward trend to accumulate a final domestic gross of 920 million RMB, ranking 13th in the history of animated theatrical releases in China.

In international markets, the film was released on 324 screens across France via Eurozoom, marking one of the widest theatrical rollouts for a Chinese-language title in the country's cinematic history. During its initial three-week French theatrical run, it drew over 150,000 admissions, setting a three-year record for Chinese cinematic distribution in the territory.

== Critical response ==
On the review aggregator website Rotten Tomatoes, 88% of 26 critics' reviews for Deep Sea are positive, with an average rating of 7.5/10.

Domestic critical reception was highly focused on the film's technological advancements and dark narrative themes. The jury of the 73rd Berlin International Film Festival praised the project for its "breathtaking, unprecedented visuals and ambitious narrative." A review from the 1905 Film Network lauded the innovative particle ink-wash style as an industry milestone that effectively pushed aesthetic boundaries. Conversely, some critics argued that the heavy focus on technological spectacle came at the expense of structural coherence. Writing for the *Journal of Nanning Normal University*, Associate Professor Du Xiaojie argued that the film suffered from a "narrative emptiness," stating that the script indulged in emotional venting rather than offering a rigorous exploration of its realistic psychological themes.

== Release ==
Deep Sea was scheduled for release on 22 January 2023 (Chinese New Year).

It was nominated for screening as part of Generation Kplus at the 73rd Berlin International Film Festival as well as for screening as Animation category at 36th Tokyo International Film Festival.
