= Armor Hero Atlas =

- Directed by: Zheng Guowei
- Production companies: Shanghai Yongxu Media; Guangdong Alpha Animation and Culture; Beijing Enlight Pictures; Beijing KAKU Cartoon Satellite TV; Guangdong TV Jiajia Cartoon tudou.com
- Distributed by: Beijing Enlight Pictures; Guangzhou Alpha Media; Huaxia Film Distribution
- Release date: October 1, 2014 (China)
- Running time: 92 minutes
- Country: China
- Box office: CN¥44.4 million (China)

Armor Hero Atlas (Chinese: 铠甲勇士之雅塔莱斯) is a 2014 Chinese science fiction action film directed by Zheng Guowei, based on the television series Armor Hero. It was released on October 1 in China.

== Plot ==
In 2013, Li Xiaochou fought with Yatales Armor and was rescued but was finally declared dead (Li Xiaochou was not actually dead, but was secretly sent to the UCP laboratory for biochemical experiments). In 2017, tomb robbers Lambda and Fu Ai were infected with the millennium Zangbao virus during the tomb robbery. They occupied the UCP control center where the Zangbao virus infected people were detained and formed the Oxer army.

Due to the interference of Yatales Armor, Ke Sheng failed to lead the D Guard to attack the UCP and was forced to withdraw from the D Guard by Director Jin. Lambda found the dying Li Xiaochou in the UCP secret room, discovered the secret of the Baozu Insect King, took out the Baozu Insect King, and upgraded it to the Baozu Insect Virus, wanting to turn all mankind into Oxer. Ma Qingshan decided to negotiate with Lambda, but failed. Humans fell into Lambda's trick. Fu Ai turned into Ma Qingshan and led Lambda out of the UCP and killed Director Jin.

Duanmu Yan and others summoned 6 sets of armor and attacked Oxer head-on. After a fierce battle, Tru Armor defeated Fu Ai. Finally, Lambda injected the violent insect virus into his body. Yatales also absorbed the four elements of nature and used Yatales Thunder to destroy it.

== Cast ==
- Xu Feng
- Cao Xiyue
- Kenny Zeng
- Li Xinze
- Zhu Jiaqi
- Li Honglei
- Long Nv
- Yan Hongyu
- Jia Yuting
- Shen Bo
- Wu Yonggan
- Geng Yi
- Hong Sheng Zhang

== Reception ==
The film grossed a total of CN¥44.417 million at the Chinese box office.
