= Midnight Train (film) =

- Directed by: Jiangnan Zhang
- Release date: March 8, 2013 (China)
- Running time: 84 minutes
- Country: China
- Language: Mandarin
- Box office: US$1 million

Midnight Train (Chinese: 午夜火车) is a 2013 Chinese horror film directed by Jiangnan Zhang.

== Reception ==
Derek Elley of Film Business Asia gave the film a 5 out of 10.
