= Snow White: The Power of Dwarfs =

Snow White The Power of Dwarfs
- Production company: Gold Valley Films
- Distributed by: Guangzhou Jinchuan Media
- Release date: August 21, 2014 (China)
- Running time: 84 minutes
- Country: China
- Languages: Mandarin; English
- Box office: US$2.78 million (China)

Snow White: The Power of Dwarfs (Chinese: 白雪公主之矮人力量) is a 2014 Chinese animated comedy fantasy adventure film directed by Adam Qiu. It was released on August 21, 2014.

== Cast (Mandarin) ==
- Chen Qing

== Cast (English) ==
- Ash Gordey as Plucky and Doby
- Ron Hendricks as Fire Wizard
- Sarah Jane Pot as The Queen

== Music ==
Songs 'I Will Find' and 'We Will Never Be Afraid' Composed by Ridwan Amir and Robert Chua Go

== Reception ==
It has earned US$2.78 million at the Chinese box office.
