= The Legend of Lucky Pie =

Chinese 2015 animated web series

- Title card
- Country of origin: China
- Original language: Chinese

Production
- Running time: 12 minutes (1-3, 5), 22 minutes (4)

Original release
- Release: January 2, 2015 – August 18, 2018

The Legend of Lucky Pie (Chinese: 幸运派传说; pinyin: xìngyùn pài chuánshuō) is a Chinese animated web series. Produced by a group of artists without funding or a studio environment, the first episode was released as a short film in early January 2015. Writers for news sites observed striking similarities to the American animated television series Adventure Time, calling it a "rip off", while some praised the animation and dedication of the producers. The plot revolves around a pony named Lucky and an anthropomorphic owl called Ah-Pie going on adventures.

== Production and release ==
Lucky Pie was produced by a group of Chinese artists who, according to Wendy Zhao of Cartoon Brew, were "enthusiastic animation friends" working against "tacky" and "trite" Chinese animated television series. While the short was produced with neither funding nor in a studio environment, the group hoped to produce more episodes. The short was released in early January 2015 (either in the first or second week; (Note: Refer to the external links in Walden 2015.) on YouTube it is on January 2) on several Chinese video sites, such as Sina Weibo, Baidu and Tudou. From the third episode of the series, the show was fully funded through Patreon.

In 2018 the team stated episode 5 is the final episode and are planning to continue the series in comic form with some art for it being released. Since 2018 there was no activity on the team's Patreon or Twitter page.

Episodes 3 and 4 had an English dub made with episode 5 being planned to receive an English dub but it wasn't ever completed or released.

In May 2018, an extended English Version of the Theme song was released.

== Episodes ==
No.	Title	Original release date
1	"Who Makes That Voice?" "什么声音"	January 2, 2015
2	"The Zodiac Maze" "星座迷宫"	October 18, 2015
3	"If It's The Last Thing I Do" "视屎如归"	May 26, 2016
4	"ALIENS" "外星人们"	August 20, 2017
5	"Am I an Owl?" "我是猫头鹰吗?"	August 18, 2018

== Reception ==
On Western-based sites, writers for news sites referred to it as a "knock-off" and a "rip-off" of the American animated television series Adventure Time. Zhao wrote that the response from Chinese viewers towards these accusations were split. For Cartoon Brew, Amid Amidi wrote that, while it might be an "honest-to-goodness knock-off or an elaborately produced hoax", the producers had "certainly spent a fair amount of time studying Adventure Time", and expressed curiosity towards the identity of the creators. Steve Wolfhard, a storyboard artist on Adventure Time, expressed his approval of the short on his Twitter account, calling it "the cutest".

Salvador Belizón of Alfa Beta Juega wrote that the release of more episodes would make it successful. Ben Furse of Moviepilot called the animation "nice" and that, overall, it was a "cheerful little cartoon". Meanwhile, in Disorder Magazine, Cha Giadach called the animation "shit", but admired the dedication of the producers. A LifeBoxset writer said that the animation had "enough merit". For Nerdist, Brittany Vincent called it "definitely ... interesting and personable", hoping for a crossover between it and Adventure Time, should the former "pick up some steam".

Chris Person of Kotaku called the short both "pretty damn cool" and "pretty solid", and although the animation was "a bit rough" compared to that of Adventure Time, considering the exhausting nature of animation, "they did alright". A writer for Publimetro wrote that, like Adventure Time, it elicited the same response of "what did you just see?". A writer for SDP Noticas wrote that, despite the similarities and the lack of budget, the producers gave "life" to it. Andrew Whalen of iDigitalTimes called it "adorable".
