= Chang'an (film) =

- Theatrical release poster
- Simplified Chinese: 长安三万里
- Traditional Chinese: 長安三萬里
- Hanyu Pinyin: Cháng'ān Sānwànlǐ
- Directed by: Xie Junwei; Zou Jing
- Written by: Hongni Xiaohuolu
- Produced by: Song Yiyi; Yu Zhou
- Starring: Yang Tianxiang; Ling Zhenhe
- Edited by: Song Xuchen
- Music by: Guo Haowei; Lo Ta-yu
- Production companies: Light Chaser Animation Studios; Alibaba Pictures; Tianjin Maoyan Weiying Culture Media; Weibo Corporation; China Film Co., Ltd.
- Distributed by: Tianjin Maoyan Weiying Culture Media; Taopiaopiao
- Release date: 8 July 2023 (China)
- Running time: 168 minutes
- Country: China
- Language: Mandarin
- Box office: US$255 million

Chang'an (Chinese: 长安三万里), also known as 30,000 Miles from Chang'an, is a 2023 Chinese 3D-animated historical drama film directed by Xie Junwei and Zou Jing. It follows the story of the decades-long friendship of poets Li Bai and Gao Shi amid the Tang dynasty's transition from peak prosperity to the turmoil of the rebellion led by An Lushan, one of Emperor Xuanzong's most favored generals. The film was produced by Light Chaser Animation Studios, Alibaba Pictures, Tianjin Maoyan Weiying Culture Media, Weibo Corporation, in association with China Film Co., Ltd.. The film premiered in China on 8 July 2023. At 168 minutes long, the film is tied with In This Corner (and Other Corners) of the World as the longest theatrically released animated films.

A total of 48 poems by various Tang period poets appeared in the film.

== Cast ==
- Yang Tianxiang as Gao Shi (Chinese: 高适; pinyin: Gāo Shì), a poet, politician, and general and close friend of Li Bai. The film is mostly from his point of view.
  - Wu Junquan as elderly Gao Shi
- Ling Zhenhe as Li Bai (Chinese: 李白; pinyin: Lǐ Bái), one of the greatest and most important poets of the Tang dynasty and in Chinese history as a whole.
  - Xuan Xiaoming as elderly Li Bai
- Liu Jiaoyu as child Du Fu (Chinese: 杜甫; pinyin: Dù Fǔ), another one of the most influential Tang poets and a good friend of Li Bai.
  - Sun Lulu as Du Fu
- Ya Jie as Geshu Han (Chinese: 哥舒翰; pinyin: Gēshū Hàn), an elderly disabled yet loyal general of the Tang empire and Gao Shi's employer.
- Ba He as Guo Ziyi (Chinese: 郭子仪, Pinyin: Guō Zǐyí), a particularly heroic general and politician wrongly accused of starting a fire and set to be executed.
- Xu Jiaqi as Princess Yuzhen
- Jiang Qiuzai as Wang Wei (Chinese: 王维, pinyin: Wáng Wéi), a musician, painter, poet, and politician.
- Li Haojia as Li Yong (Chinese: 李邕; pinyin: Lǐ Yōng), a politician, writer, and calligrapher.
- Yang Kaiqi as Chang Jian (Chinese: 常建; pinyin: Cháng Jiàn), a poet.
- Fu Bowen as Cen Shen (Chinese: 岑参, pinyin: Cén Shēn), a poet.

== Release ==
Chang'an was released on 8 July 2023 in mainland China and on August 25 2023 in Hong Kong and Macau. The movie then opened in the US and Canada on 6 October 2023, distributed by Niu Vision Media.

== Reception ==
The Chinese film reviews website Douban gave the drama 8.3 out of 10 rating, one of the highest for wide-release animated films.

== Box office ==
Chang'an grossed 1.823 billion yuan in Chinese box office, making it the 4th highest-grossing Chinese animated film ever.
