= Godbeast Megazord: Return of Green Dragon =

- Poster
- Chinese: 神兽金刚之青龙再现
- Directed by: Zhu Xiaobing; Huang Yiqing
- Based on: Godbeast Megazord by Guangzhou Dali Animation
- Production companies: Pearl River Film Group; Guangzhou Dali Animation; Beijing KAKU Cartoon Satellite TV
- Distributed by: Pearl River Pictures
- Release date: 15 September 2016
- Running time: 87 minutes
- Country: China
- Language: Mandarin
- Box office: CN¥6.1 million

Godbeast Megazord: Return of Green Dragon is a 2016 Chinese animated fantasy adventure film directed by Zhu Xiaobing and Huang Yiqing. The film serves as a sequel for the TV Series Godbeast Megazord, and was released in China by Pearl River Pictures on 15 September 2016.

== Plot ==
The Curse Emperor, who has always coveted the earth's water resources, summoned the ancient behemoth on earth, the Fat Beast, and launched a larger-scale plundering offensive. However, the five members of the Divine Beast Team, the Blue Flame Dragon Superman Ye Hui (Azure Dragon Godbeast Rangers), the Golden Fire Scale Superman Lin Cong (Qilin Godbeast Rangers), the Silver Sky Tiger Superman Zhang Li (White Tiger Godbeast Rangers), the Red Phoenix Superman Zhao Yan (Vermilion Bird Godbeast Rangers) and the Green Xuanwu Superman Chen Feng (Tortoise Godbeast Rangers) each showed their magical powers and started a new round of battle.

== Cast ==
- Huang Jian As Lin Chong (Samson)
- Li Zhongxin Ye Hui (Ken)
- Xie Ansheng As Chen Feng (Bob)
- Zefei As ZhangLi (Harry)
- Chen Caiyu As Zhao Yan (Suzy/Suey)
- Bai Wenxian As Zhouma Huangdi

== Reception ==
The film has grossed CN¥6.1 million at the Chinese box office.
