= The Adventures of Sinbad 2 =

- Directed by: Gu Peixin; Benpineko
- Starring: Yang Ou; Huang Ying; Yang Menglu; Xie Tiantian; Xia Lei
- Release date: May 30, 2014
- Running time: 88 minutes
- Country: China
- Language: Mandarin
- Box office: US$3.82 million

The Adventures of Sinbad 2 (Chinese: 辛巴达历险记2), also known as The Adventures of Sinbad 2014, is a 2014 Chinese animated adventure comedy film directed by Gu Peixin and Benpineko.

== Cast ==
- Yang Ou
- Huang Ying
- Yang Menglu
- Xie Tiantian
- Xia Lei

== Box Office ==
The film has grossed US$3.82 million at the Chinese box office.
