= The Grow =

Chinese animated adventure comedy film

- Poster
- Directed by: Ha Lei
- Release date: December 29, 2012 (China)
- Running time: 88 minutes
- Country: China
- Language: Mandarin
- Box office: CN¥10.97 million (China)

The Grow (Chinese: 金箍棒传奇) is a 2012 Chinese animated adventure comedy film directed by Ha Lei. It was released in China on December 29, 2012. The film was followed by The Grow 2 (2015).

== Voice cast ==
- Han Xue
- Wu Tian Hao
- Yu Li
- Rong Rong
- Tong Zirong
- Zhou Yemang

== Reception ==
The film earned CN¥10.97 million at the Chinese box office.
