= New Happy Dad and Son 2: The Instant Genius =

- Poster
- Chinese: 新大头儿子和小头爸爸2一日成才
- Directed by: He Cheng; Zhang Zhenyi
- Production companies: Luming Pictures; Zhong Yang Television Station Yang Shi Dong Hua; China Radio, Film & TV Programs Exchanging Center; Beijing E Xi E Entertainment Production; Xi'an Qujiang Film&TV Investment Group; Heyi Information Technology (Beijing)
- Distributed by: China Film Group Corporation; Beijing E Xi E Entertainment Production; Wuzhou Film Distribution; Eastern Mordor; Sihai Distribution Association; Beijing Weiying Shidai Technology; Tianjin Maoyan Media; Xi'an Qujiang Film&TV Investment Group
- Release date: 19 August 2016 (China)
- Running time: 85 minutes
- Country: China
- Language: Mandarin
- Box office: CN¥87 million

New Happy Dad and Son 2: The Instant Genius is a 2016 Chinese animated family comedy film directed by He Cheng and Zhang Zhenyi. It was released in China on 19 August 2016.

== Cast ==
- Liu Chunyan
- Dong Hao
- Ju Ping
- Lin Yongjian
- Lin Dajun
- Jia Jie
- He Ziran
- Chen Su
- Geng Chenchen
- Huang Wei

== Reception ==
The film has grossed CN¥87 million at the Chinese box office.
