= The Magical Brush =

- Directed by: Frankie Chung
- Starring: Shao Yichen; Meng Xianglong; Hong Haitian; Leo Wu; Guo Yifeng; Wu Wenlun
- Release date: 25 July 2014
- Running time: 87 minutes
- Country: China
- Language: Mandarin
- Box office: US$8,520,000

The Magical Brush (Chinese: 神笔马良; pinyin: Shén bǐ mǎliáng; lit. 'Ma Liang and the divine pen') is a 2014 Chinese animated fantasy film directed by Frankie Chung. It was released on 25 July 2014.

The movie is an adaptation of classic Chinese folk tale Ma Liang and his Magic Brush.

== Cast ==
- Shao Yichen
- Meng Xianglong
- Hong Haitian
- Leo Wu
- Guo Yifeng
- Wu Wenlun

== Reception ==
=== Box office ===
The film earned CN¥58.626 million at the Chinese box office.
