= Shi Er Sheng Xiao Cheng Shi Ying Xiong =

- Directed by: Ge Haitao
- Production companies: Anhui Film Group; Anhui Tongren Media Co., Ltd
- Release date: October 3, 2014 (China)
- Running time: 80 minutes
- Country: China
- Box office: ¥0.48 million (China)

Shi Er Sheng Xiao Cheng Shi Ying Xiong (Chinese: 十二生肖城市英雄) is a 2014 Chinese animated comedy film directed by Ge Haitao. It was released on October 3, 2014 in China.

== Voice cast ==
- Su Qianyun
- Ding Runqi
- Wang Yan
- Xie Lili

== Reception ==
By October 7, 2014, the film had earned ¥0.48 million at the Chinese box office.
