= Legend of the Moles – The Magic Train Adventure =

- 摩尔庄园3：魔幻列车大冒险
- Directed by: Li Tingting
- Production companies: Shanghai Taomee Network & Technology Co., Ltd. China Film Group Corporation; Beijing KAKU Cartoon Satellite TV; Hunan TV Aniworld Satellite TV
- Distributed by: China Film Group Corporation
- Release date: February 5, 2015
- Running time: 86 minutes
- Country: China
- Language: Mandarin
- Box office: CN¥1.81 million

Legend of the Moles – The Magic Train Adventure (Chinese: 摩尔庄园3：魔幻列车大冒险) is a 2015 Chinese animated family adventure film directed by Li Tingting. It was released on February 5, 2015.

== Voice cast ==
- Yang Ou
- Xia Lei
- Xie Tiantian
- Feng Junhua
- Cu Cu
- Shen Dawei
- Fan Junhang

== Reception ==
By February 5, the film had earned CN¥1.81 million at the Chinese box office.

== See also ==
- Legend of the Moles: The Frozen Horror (2011)
- Legend of the Moles: The Treasure of Scylla (2012)
