= Aura Star: Attack of the Temple =

- Film poster
- 奥拉星：进击圣殿
- Directed by: Frankie Chung
- Production companies: Pearl River Film Group; Guangzhou Baitian Information Technology; Toonmax Media; Talent Manufacture; Meiya Media; Hongtu Guanghe Film Investment Fund
- Distributed by: Pearl River Pictures; Toonmax Media; Sihai Distribution Association; Meiya Great Wall Media (Beijing); LiaoNing China Film BeiFang Cinema Circuit; ZiBo QiNa Movie Investment Company
- Release date: 23 July 2015
- Running time: 92 minutes
- Country: China
- Language: Mandarin
- Box office: CN¥8.5 million

Aura Star: Attack of the Temple (Chinese: 奥拉星：进击圣殿), also known as Aola Star, is a 2015 3D Chinese animated children's fantasy adventure film directed by Frankie Chung. It was released on 23 July 2015. It is based on the online web browser game Aola Star.

== Plot ==
The protagonist, Donghuang Taiyi, serves as the guardian of an ancient temple. When the temple is invaded, he is ordered to flee to Aola with Tiandao Wuji. After being severely injured, he loses his memory and is transformed into a cute Abi. He is taken in by the Aola star Landing, who names him Tai Er. Gradually, Tai Er adapts to life on Aola and makes some friends. Together, they uncover a conspiracy by dark forces and strive to protect Aola. In the process, Tai Er begins to recover his memories and takes on the challenging mission of restoring the temple.

== Voice cast ==
- Anqi Zhang
- Qi Zhang
- Zhengxiang Li
- Shuai Zhou
- Beichen Liu
- Feng Jin
- Lu Zhao
- Jia Zhan
- Xianglong Meng

== Reception ==
The film earned 8.475 million Chinese Yuan (1.16 million USD) at the Chinese box office.
