= Kung Fu Style =

- 特功明星
- Directed by: Xu Kerr
- Release date: April 10, 2015
- Running time: 90 minutes
- Country: China
- Language: Mandarin
- Box office: CN¥2.93 million (China)

Kung Fu Style (Chinese: 特功明星) is a 2015 Chinese animated action adventure comedy film directed by Xu Kerr. It was released on April 10, 2015.

== Voice cast ==
- Huang Ying
- Cao Zhen
- Zhang Anqi
- Li Zhengxiang
- Cheng Yuzhu
- Hai Fang
- Liu Bin
- Hu Yi
- Meng Xianglong
- Ye Lu
- Wei Siyun
- Wang Jianxin
- Zhan Jia

== Reception ==
The film earned CN¥2.93 million at the Chinese box office.
