= Monkey King: Hero Is Back =

2015 Chinese computer-animated film

- Theatrical poster
- Directed by: Tian Xiaopeng
- Screenplay by: Tian Xiaopeng; Cheng Jin; Ran Jin; Tu Liu; Li Mi
- Based on: Journey to the West by Wu Cheng'en
- Produced by: Jiang Hui; Liu Zhijiang; Lin Zhonglun; Yang Dan; Wang Weiming
- Music by: Florian Linckus; Wong Ying-Wah
- Production companies: Beijing Weiyingshidai Culture & Media; Hengdian Chinese Film Production Co. October Animation Studio; S&C Pictures; Shandong Film and Television Production Center
- Distributed by: United Entertainment Partners; Maruti Enterprise (South Asia)
- Release date: 10 July 2015
- Running time: 90 minutes
- Country: China
- Languages: Mandarin; English
- Budget: US$16 million
- Box office: US$153 million

Chinese name
- Simplified Chinese: 西游记之大圣归来
- Traditional Chinese: 西遊記之大聖歸來
- Literal meaning: Journey to the West: Return of the Great Sage
Transcriptions
Standard Mandarin
- Hanyu Pinyin: Xīyóu jì zhī dà shèng guīlái
Yue: Cantonese
- Jyutping: sai^{1}jau^{4} gei^{3} zi^{1} daai^{6}sing^{3} gwai^{1}loi^{4}

Monkey King: Hero Is Back (Chinese: 西游记之大圣归来; pinyin: Xīyóu jì zhī dà shèng guīlái; lit. 'Journey to the West: Return of the Great Sage') is a 2015 Chinese computer-animated fantasy adventure film written and directed by Tian Xiaopeng in his directorial debut. The film was released on 10 July 2015, and became the highest-grossing animated film in China until it was surpassed by the 2016 films Zootopia and Kung Fu Panda 3.

A prequel to the film titled Monkey King: Havoc in Heaven is currently in development.

== Plot ==
The all-powerful Monkey King, Sun Wukong, is imprisoned by the Buddha within an ice cage deep in the mountains for rebelling against Heaven.

Five hundred years later, Mountain Trolls attack a group of travelers, killing everyone except for a baby boy named Liuer, who is adopted by a monk after floating down a river in a basket. (The name Jiang Liuer means "River Flow Child.") Several years later, the same trolls invade a small village and kidnap 49 young children. Liuer saves one of the baby girls and is chased by the trolls for doing so. He stumbles into the cave where the Monkey King was imprisoned and unknowingly releases him from his curse. Sun Wukong defeats the trolls, but he can only use physical attacks, as a remnant of Buddha's seal prevents him from regaining his magical powers, causing him pain whenever he tries to harness his magic.

Wukong attempts to break the Buddha's seal, but to no avail. Liuer and the girl enthusiastically greet Wukong, unaware that he has lost his powers, and pester him with endless questions. (For example, when Liuer asks if the god Nezha is a boy or a girl, Wukong answers, "a girl.") Annoyed, Wukong tries to avoid the two but is unable to evade them. A stone monster, created by the Buddha to keep Wukong imprisoned, attacks the three. Liuer manages to undo the spell on the monster but falls off a cliff in the process. When he awakens, he discovers that Wukong has saved him.

The three encounter Pigsy, the Heavenly Immortal "Tian Peng Yuan Shuai" (Marshal of Heavenly Canopy), whom Wukong defeated when he rebelled against Heaven 500 years ago, now reincarnated as a pig demon. Although Wukong is initially hesitant, Pigsy joins the group as well. They also run into a white dragon that attacks them and tries to eat Liuer, but Sun Wukong scares it off. (This also occurred in the original canon, although, unlike in the original books, the dragon does not turn into a white horse.)

They stay overnight at an inn, but its owners turn out to be trolls in disguise who try to kidnap the baby. More trolls arrive, and Wukong fights them off. The leader of the monsters, Hun Dun, appears, defeating Wukong and capturing the girl. After Wukong refuses to pursue them, Liuer decides to go ahead and save them on his own.

Hun Dun reveals his plan to sacrifice all the children they have kidnapped in order to gain magical powers. Liuer meets with his mentor, Fa Ming, to try to rescue them but nearly gets captured. Wukong finds a doll of himself that Liuer had and realizes how important he is as a figure. He and Pigsy go to help Liuer. After saving Liuer and the 49 children, Wukong defeats the monsters. However, a solar eclipse occurs, and Hun Dun transforms into a giant monstrous beast. Liuer is seemingly crushed by the rubble from Hun Dun's rampage. Upon seeing the boy's apparent death, Sun Wukong is devastated. Full of fury, he forcibly breaks Buddha's seal, regaining his original supernatural powers, and easily defeats Hun Dun.

The final part of this movie connects to the themes in the original canon. Sun Wukong only regains his powers when he fights for someone else rather than for himself, as his powers are meant to protect the monk Xuanzang/Tang Seng/Tang Sanzang against evil and lead him to enlightenment. Sun Wukong as a character is also meant to represent an enlightened mind, which is why his staff emerges from his head. Jiang Liuer himself is the younger Xuanzang, as he only received the name Xuanzang after he was ordained.

In the end, Liuer is shown to have survived Hun Dun's rampage, and they return the abducted children to their families.

== Cast ==
Character	Mandarin	English
Sun Wukong, the Monkey King	Lei Zhang	Jackie Chan
Liuer	Zijie Lin	Kannon Kurowski
Fa Ming	Wenlun Wu	James Hong
Hun Dun	Zirong Tong	Feodor Chin
Li Jing / Pigsy	Jiurong Liu	Roger Craig Smith
Jade Emperor	TBA	David S. Jung
Father	Qianjing Zhao	David S. Jung
Lady Troll	Wu Di	Nika Futterman

== Crowdfunding ==
7.8 million yuan ($1.23 million) of the film's marketing costs was raised through crowdfunding, in exchange for listing of the 109 financiers (many of whom are children) in the film's credits.

== Reception ==
=== Box office ===
The film grossed $17.99 million CNY (US$2.85 million) on its opening day, placing third at the Chinese box office. With positive reviews and word of mouth, the film's box office reception steadily increased, peaking at $65.87 million CNY (US$10.44 million) a day, and first at the box office. The film began to drop due to competition from Monster Hunt and finished its run with a gross of $957 million CNY (US$153 million). The film became the seventh highest-grossing film in China of 2015 and the highest grossing animated film in China until being surpassed by Zootopia and Kung Fu Panda 3 the following year.

== Other media ==
On October 17, 2019, a video game based on the film was released on PlayStation 4, developed by HexaDrive with assistance from Japan Studio and published by Sony Interactive Entertainment in Asia and THQ Nordic internationally; a Windows port published by Oasis Games was also released on the same day. As Sun Wukong (renamed Dasheng in the English dub), players guide Liuer and Pigsy (Zhu Bajie) to fight off Mountain Trolls and other monsters to save the kidnapped children from the clutches of the demon king Hun Dun, use statues of Guanyin to unlock spells to enhance skills and use various weapons to battle enemies. Two DLCs were available: Mind Palace, which is set within Sun Wukong's mind sealed inside the Buddha's crystal, where he trains himself in a series of obstacles and traps between different biomes, and Uproar in Heaven, which is set before the main story where the monkey king duels against three of the Jade Emperor's greatest warriors, Nezha, Juling Shen and the Jade Emperor's nephew Erlang Shen.

The film crosses over with other animated films such as Ne Zha and Jiang Ziya in various commercials.

== Accolades ==
Year	Awards	Category	Outcome
2015	Golden Rooster Awards	Best Animated Feature	Won
2015	Silk Road International Film Festival	Animated Film of the Year 2015	Won
2015	China Animation & Comic Competition Golden Dragon Award	Best Animated Feature Film	Won
2015	China Animation & Comic Competition Golden Dragon Award	Best Directing for an Animation	Won
2015	Sichuan TV Festival Golden Panda Award	Best Directing for an Animation	Nominated
2015	Golden Horse Film Festival	Best Animation Feature	Nominated

== Future ==
A prequel titled Monkey King: Havoc in Heaven is in development as of 2023.
