= 108 Demon Kings =

- Film poster
- Directed by: Pascal Morelli
- Screenplay by: Pascal Morelli; Jean Pécheux
- Produced by: François Cornuau; Vincent Roget
- Starring: Lucien Jean-Baptiste
- Cinematography: François Hernandez
- Music by: Rolfe Kent
- Production company: Fundamental Films
- Distributed by: Gébéka Films
- Release dates: 4 December 2014 (Forum des Images); 21 January 2015 (France)
- Running time: 104 minutes
- Countries: France; Belgium; Luxembourg
- Language: French
- Budget: $11.4 million

108 Demon Kings (French: 108 Rois-Démons) is a 2014 animated family adventure film directed by Pascal Morelli. The film premiered at the Forum des Images on 4 December 2014 before it was released theatrically wide in France on 21 January 2015 in France.

== Voice cast ==
- Lucien Jean-Baptiste as Tourbillon-Noir
- Bertrand Nadler as Tête-de-Léopard
- Jean-Yves Chatelais as L'Empereur
- Franck Capillery as Face-Blanche
- Daniela Labbé Cabrera as Vipère-Jaune
- Philippe Catoire as Zhang
- Lucille Boudonnat as Duan (petit)
- Hélène Bizot as Duan (grand)
- Hanako Danjo as Pei Pei
- Xavier Aubert as Cai Jing
- Mark Antoine as Maréchal Gao
- Jean-Loup Horwitz as Doyen des mandarins
- Roland Timsit as Mort-Prématurée
- Pierre Forest (actor) as Trépas-Instantané
- Franck Gourlat as Barbe-Pourpre

== Reception ==
The film had 30,005 admissions at the French box office.
