= Agent F.O.X. =

- Theatrical release poster
- Chinese: 兔子镇的火狐狸
- Directed by: Ge Shuiying
- Produced by: Xia Bing; Jin Hao; Hu Xue Peng
- Starring: Qiao Shiyu; Yu Zhou; Zhang Yaohan; Shang Hong; Xuan Xiaoming; Chen Hao; Zhang Wei; Li Zhiwei
- Production companies: Kunshan Zhangpu Haoshanshui Animation; Beijing Shuzi Linghai Films Technology; Erduosishi Hengqida Media
- Distributed by: Beijing G-POINT Film Culture Media 河南约克动漫影视股份有限公司 维乐享电影文化（北京）有限公司; Aiweixiao Culture Media (Beijing)
- Release date: 30 October 2015 (China)
- Running time: 90 minutes
- Country: China
- Language: Mandarin
- Box office: CN¥1.3 million

Agent F.O.X. (Chinese: 兔子镇的火狐狸), also known as The Firefox of Bunnington Burrows, is a 2015 Chinese animated fantasy adventure film directed by Ge Shuiying. The film was released on 30 October 2015 in both 2D and 3D.

== Plot ==
Super spy Agent F.O.X. arrives in Carrot Town intending to complete one objective, which is to infiltrate the community of friendly rabbits and locate a mysterious artifact. The mission goes awry, however, when the secret agent is mistaken for a distant cousin.

== Voice cast ==
- Qiao Shiyu as 017
- Yu Zhou as Princess
- Zhang Yaohan as Foretooth King
- Shang Hong as Big Eye Rabbit
- Xuan Xiaoming as Big Tiger
- Chen Hao as Shadow-less Rabbit
- Zhang Wei as Day-dreaming Rabbit
- Li Zhiwei as Captain Fox

== Box office ==
The film has earned CN¥1.357 million (US$209,000) at the Chinese box office.

== See also ==
- Foxes in popular culture, films and literature
