= The Grow 2 =

- 金箍棒传奇2：沙僧的逆袭
- Directed by: Ha Lei
- Music by: Chen Zhiyi
- Release date: May 29, 2015
- Running time: 91 minutes
- Country: China
- Language: Mandarin
- Box office: CN¥4.36 million (China)

The Grow 2 (Chinese: 金箍棒传奇2：沙僧的逆袭) is a 2015 Chinese animated adventure comedy film directed by Ha Lei. It was released in China on May 29, 2015. The film was preceded by The Grow (2012).

== Voice cast ==
- Yu Li
- Wu Tian Hao
- Rong Rong
- Zhang Yuan

== Reception ==
By June 2, 2015, the film had earned CN¥4.36 million at the Chinese box office.
