= Rabbit Hero =

- 超能兔战队
- Directed by: Fu Yan
- Release date: May 30, 2015
- Running time: 80 minutes
- Country: China
- Language: Mandarin
- Box office: CN¥1.26 million (China)

Rabbit Hero (Chinese: 超能兔战队) is a 2015 Chinese animated science fiction comedy film directed by Fu Yan. It was released in China on May 30, 2015.

== Plot ==
When humans landed on the moon, they brought four rabbit test subjects with them but forgot to bring them back. These rabbits were adopted by the plump goddess Chang'e, also known as "Pork Chop Fatty." The rabbits absorbed the moon's energy in the Moon Palace, transforming into super-powered rabbits. Chang'e loved to disguise herself, attracting fans and becoming a virtual idol, with the rabbits supporting her as her online scam accomplices. They helped boost Chang'e's popularity, turning her into a new generation of scam goddess.

A giant bear named "Hubby" fell in love with the popular Photoshopped online idol "Moon Goddess Chang'e" and came to the moon to pursue her. He discovered that the real "Chang'e" was actually a plump and unattractive woman. Enraged, he kidnapped "Chang'e" and took her to Earth.

The rabbits launched a rescue mission to save Chang'e. They followed Hubby to Earth, where they met a young man named "Leung Cha Wai." They learned the secrets of Cantonese herbal tea and turned it into a weapon to fight against the rampaging Hubby bear. They successfully rescued Chang'e and brought Cantonese delicacies back to the moon, using health and love to make Chang'e truly beautiful.

== Voice cast ==
- Liu Hongyun
- Li Xuqiao
- Bai Wenxian
- Shen Ke
- Song Lei
- Zhou Yan
- Li Sixian
- Zhang Zikun
- Li Taichen
- Dong Yuxin

== Box office ==
The film earned CN¥1.26 million at the Chinese box office.
