= 10000 Years Later =

- Poster
- 一万年以后
- Directed by: Yi Li
- Release date: March 27, 2015
- Running time: 93 minutes
- Country: China
- Language: Mandarin
- Box office: CN¥27.7 million (China)

10000 Years Later (Chinese: 一万年以后) is a 2015 Chinese animated epic action fantasy film directed by Yi Li. It was released on March 27, 2015.

== Synopsis ==
This story takes place in the far future after a cataclysmic event that forces humanity to revert to a medieval-style civilization. Wugreb, the leader of a Tibetan tribe called the Wu Tribe, led an expedition to the Western Regions of China to rediscover an ancient city called Tech City, which their ancestors created at the acme of their civilization. Wugreb, however, became drunk with the new-found technology he recovered from Tech City, and uses it to create a vast army of monsters and demons to conquer the world, starting with the Western Regions.

His plans for global domination were thwarted, however, by the guardian goddess of Tibet, Kelsang. Wugreb is then imprisoned within the tomb of Kuger for a thousand years. The effects of Wugreb's onslaught are evident around the world. Many new creatures and even new human species rise up because of Tech City's return to the world. The seal placed by Kelsang, holding Wugreb in his prison, begins to wane in power. It's up to a young storyteller and her warrior comrades from around the world to rise up and stand against the invasion of Wugreb and the return of Tech City.

== Cast ==
- Joma 珠玛
- Yalayam 亚拉亚姆
- Yi Li 易立
- Wang Chong 王翀
- Wang Lu 王鲁
- Zhou Ting
- Zhong Guilin
- Teng Mengqiao
- Liu Yong
- Nie Shengjie
- Liu Pingping
- Jia Lu
- Deng Haiying
- Wang Yi
- Xia Shuoming
- Lu Xiaofei
- Chen Jingxing
- Li Fei
- Li Siru

== Reception ==
The film earned CN¥27.731 million at the Chinese box office.
