= Polar Adventure =

- Poster
- Chinese: 极地大反攻
- Directed by: Qiao Fang
- Starring: Li Minyan; Li Ye; Yan Lizhen
- Production company: Su Zhou Ou Rui Dong Man
- Distributed by: Beijing G-POINT Film Culture Media
- Release date: October 1, 2015
- Running time: 94 minutes
- Country: China
- Language: Mandarin
- Box office: CN¥4 million

Polar Adventure (Chinese: 极地大反攻) is a 2015 Chinese animated adventure comedy film directed by Qiao Fang. It was released on October 1, 2015.

== Voice cast ==
- Li Minyan
- Li Ye
- Yan Lizhen

== Box office ==
The film has earned CN¥3.987 million at the Chinese box office.
