= Tianjin Maoyan Weiying Culture Media =

Chinese media company

- Native name: 天津猫眼微影文化传媒
- Industry: Film
- Headquarters: China
- Products: Online movie tickets
- Owner: Wang Xing (85.5%)
- Website: maoyan.com

Tianjin Maoyan Weiying Culture Media (Chinese: 天津猫眼微影文化传媒有限公司) is a Chinese company that owns the largest online movie ticketing website in China, maoyan.com, with 30% share of the market in 2015. In 2016, Wang Changtian of Beijing Enlight Media offered to buy a controlling stake in the company. The company also co-produces and co-distributes films.

== Filmography ==
- Wild City (2015)
- To the Fore (2015)
- SPL 2: A Time For Consequences (2015)
- Monk Comes Down the Mountain (2015)
- Lost in Hong Kong (2015)
- Saving Mr. Wu (2015)
- Mountains May Depart (2015)
- A Fool (2015)
- Surprise (2015)
- Detective Chinatown (2015)
- Boonie Bears III (2016)
- The Mermaid (2016)
- Mr. Nian (2016)
- MBA Partners (2016)
- New Happy Dad and Son 2: The Instant Genius (2016)
- Heartfall Arises (2016)
- Mr. Donkey (2016)
- Sky on Fire (2016)
- Some Like It Hot (2016)
- Buddies in India (2017)
- Revenge for Love (2017)
- The Eleventh Chapter (2019)
- Boonie Bears: The Wild Life (2021)
- Наppy Mom and Girl 1: Sweetheart on Mission (2023)
- Pegasus 3 (2026)
- Vanishing Point (2026)
