= List of animated feature films of 2012 =

This is a list of animated feature films first released in 2012.

== List ==
Animated feature films first released in 2012
Title	Country	Director	Production company	Animation technique	Notes	Type	Release date	Duration
.hack//The Movie ドットハック セカイの向こうに (Dotto Hakku Sekai no Mukō ni)	Japan	Hiroshi Matsuyama	CyberConnect2	Computer			January 21, 2012	112 minutes
009 Re:Cyborg	Japan	Kenji Kamiyama	Production I.G	Computer			October 27, 2012	105 minutes
A Fairly Odd Christmas	Canada	Savage Steve Holland	Billionfold Inc. Frederator Studios; Pacific Bay Entertainment; Nickelodeon Productions	Computer / Live action			November 29, 2012	66 minutes
After School Midnighters 放課後MIDNIGHTERS (Hōkago Midnighters)	Japan	Hitoshi Takekiyo	Koo-Ki	Computer			August 25, 2012	95 minutes
The Apostle	Spain	Fernando Cortizo	Artefacto producciones	Stop motion			April 27, 2012 (Málaga Film Festival); October 7, 2012 (Sitges Film Festival); October 31, 2012	84 minutes 80 minutes (Spain)
Approved for Adoption; Couleur de peau: miel	France; Belgium; South Korea; Switzerland	Laurent Boileau; Jung	Artémis Productions; Mosaïque Films	Computer / Traditional			June 6, 2012	70 minutes
The Amazing Adventures of the Living Corpse	United States	Justin Paul Ritter	Shoreline Entertainment	Computer			July 14, 2012 (San Diego Comic Con)	84 minutes
Anpanman: Revive Banana Island それいけ!アンパンマン よみがえれ バナナ島	Japan	Hiroyuki Yano	Anpanman Production Committee; TMS Entertainment	Traditional			July 7, 2012	46 minutes
Arjun: The Warrior Prince	India	Arnab Chaudhuri	UTV Motion Pictures	Computer / Traditional			May 25, 2012	96 minutes
Asura アシュラ	Japan	Keiichi Sato	Toei Animation	Computer / Traditional			September 29, 2012	75 minutes
A Turtle's Tale 2: Sammy's Escape from Paradise	Belgium	Ben Stassen	nWave Pictures; Illuminata Pictures; Motion Investment Group; BNP Paribas Fortis Film Fund; Le Tax Shelter du Gouvernement Fédéral de Belgique uFilm	Computer			August 15, 2012	92 minutes
Back to the Sea	China	Thom Lu	Glory & Dream Entertainment; Funimation	Traditional / Computer			January 27, 2012	96 minutes
Batman: The Dark Knight Returns – Part 1	United States	Jay Oliva	Warner Premiere; DC Entertainment; Warner Bros. Animation; MOI Animation (Animation services)	Traditional		Direct-to-video	September 25, 2012 (Part 1)	76 minutes (Part 1)
Ben 10: Destroy All Aliens	United States; Singapore	Victor Cook	Tiny Island Productions; Turner Broadcasting System Asia Pacific; Monkey Punch Studio, LLC	Computer			March 11, 2012	69 minutes
Barbie: The Princess & the Popstar	United States	Ezekiel Norton	Universal Studios; Arc Productions; Rainmaker Studios	Computer			September 11, 2012	73 minutes
Barbie in A Mermaid Tale 2	United States	William Lau	Universal Studios; Arc Productions; Rainmaker Studios	Computer			February 27, 2012	74 minutes
Berserk Golden Age Arc I: The Egg of the King ベルセルク 黄金時代篇I 覇王の卵 (''Berserk Ōgon Jidai-Hen I: Haō no Tamago)	Japan	Toshiyuki Kubooka	Studio 4°C	Traditional			February 4, 2012	77 minutes
Berserk Golden Age Arc II: The Battle for Doldrey ベルセルク 黄金時代篇II ドルドレイ攻略 (Berserk Ōgon Jidai-Hen II: Doldrey Kōryaku)	Japan	Toshiyuki Kubooka	Studio 4°C	Traditional			June 23, 2012	98 minutes
Big Top Scooby-Doo!	United States	Ben Jones	Warner Bros. Animation	Traditional		Direct-to-video	October 9, 2012	80 minutes
Blackie & Kanuto	Spain; Italy; France	Francis Nielsen	Baleuko; Lumiq Studios; Film Investment Piedmont; Art'Mell; Talape	Computer			May 2012	81 minutes
Blood-C: The Last Dark	Japan	Naoyoshi Shiotani	Production I.G	Traditional			June 2, 2012	110 minutes
Blue Exorcist: The Movie	Japan	Atsushi Takahashi	A-1 Pictures	Traditional			December 28, 2012	90 minutes
Brave	United States	Mark Andrews; Brenda Chapman	Pixar Animation Studios	Computer		Theatrical	June 10, 2012 (SIFF); June 22, 2012	93 minutes
Bratz: Desert Jewelz	United States	Mucci Fassett	MGA Entertainment	Computer		Direct-to-DVD	January 10, 2012	74 minutes
Chhota Bheem and the Curse of Damyaan	India	Rajiv Chilaka	Green Gold Animation	Computer			May 18, 2012	88 minutes
Cinderella: Once upon a time in the west... Cendrillon: Elle etait une fois dans l'Ouest...	Belgium; France	Pascal Hérold	Delacave Paris	Computer			July 25, 2012	81 minutes
Consuming Spirits	United States	Chris Sullivan		Mixed			December 12, 2012 (New York City)	136 minutes
Crayon Shin-chan: Arashi o Yobu! Ora to Uchū no Princess クレヨンしんちゃん 嵐を呼ぶ!オラと宇宙のプリンセス	Japan		Shin-Ei Animation	Traditional			April 14, 2012	111 minutes
Diary of a Wimpy Kid: Dog Days	United States	David Bowers	20th Century Fox	Traditional / Live action		Theatrical	August 3, 2012	94 minutes
The Day of the Crows; Le Jour des Corneilles	France; Belgium; Canada; Luxembourg	Jean-Christophe Dessaint	Finalement; Mélusine Productions; Walking The Dog; Max Films	Traditional			October 1, 2012 (Festival du Film Francophone de Namur); October 24, 2012 (Belgium)	96 minutes
Delhi Safari	India	Nikhil Advani	Krayon Pictures	Computer			October 19, 2012	92 minutes
Raven the Little Rascal; Der kleine Rabe Socke – Gemeinsam bin ich stark!	Germany	Ute von Münchow-Pohl; Sandor Jesse	Studio 88	Traditional			September 6, 2012	78 minutes
Detective Conan: The Eleventh Striker	Japan	Kobun Shizuno	TMS Entertainment	Traditional			April 14, 2012	110 minutes
Dino Time	United States; South Korea	Yoon-suk Choi; John Kafka	CJ Entertainment; Myriad Pictures; Toiion	Computer			November 30, 2012	88 minutes
Dji. Death fails	Moldova	Dmitri Voloshin		Computer			2012	4 minutes
Dog Bowl and Chuki-Cookie; Собака Шара и Чуки-Куки	Russia	Elena Chernova; Alex Kotyonochkin	Argus	Traditional			2012	9 minutes
Doraemon: Nobita and the Island of Miracles—Animal Adventure	Japan	Kôzô Kusuba	Shin-Ei Animation	Traditional			March 3, 2012	100 minutes
Dragon Age: Dawn of the Seeker ドラゴンエイジ ブラッドメイジの聖戦 (Dragon Age: Blood Mage no Seisen)	United States; Japan	Fumihiko Sori	BioWare; Electronic Arts; FUNimation Entertainment; Oxybot; T.O Entertainment	Computer			February 11, 2012	90 minutes
Echo Planet	Thailand	Kompin Keamkumned	Kantana Animation Studios	Computer			August 2, 2012	81 minutes
Eien no Monogatari	Japan			Traditional			October 13, 2012	110 minutes
Ernest & Celestine	Belgium; France; Luxembourg	Stéphane Aubier; Vincent Patar; Benjamin Renner	La Parti Productions; Les Armateurs; Melusine Productions	Traditional / Flash			May 23, 2012 (Cannes); December 12, 2012 (France); December 19, 2012 (Belgium)	80 minutes
Evangelion: 3.0 ヱヴァンゲリヲン新劇場版：Q Quickening (Evangerion Shin Gekijōban: Kyū Kuikkuningu)	Japan	Hideaki Anno; Kazuya Tsurumaki; Masayuki	Studio Khara	Traditional			November 17, 2012	96 minutes
Exchange Student Zero	Australia	Bruce Kane; Patrick Crawley	Bogan Entertainment	Traditional			December 16, 2012	70 minutes
Fairy Tail the Movie: The Phoenix Priestess 劇場版 FAIRY TAIL 鳳凰の巫女 (Gekijōban Fearī Teiru: Hōō no Miko)	Japan	Masaya Fujimori	A-1 Pictures	Traditional			August 18, 2012	86 minutes
Fat, Bald, Short Man; Gordo, calvo y bajito	Colombia	Carlos Osuna	Malta Cine; Ciné-Sud Promotion; Perfect Circle Productions	Rotoscoping			September 30, 2012	91 minutes
Foodfight!	United States	Larry Kasanoff	Threshold Animation Studios; Fireman's Fund Insurance Company	Computer			June 15, 2012	87 minutes
Frankenweenie	United States	Tim Burton	Walt Disney Pictures; Tim Burton Productions	Stop motion		Theatrical	September 20, 2012 (Fantastic Fest); October 5, 2012	87 minutes
Fuse Teppō Musume no Torimonochō	Japan	Masayuki Miyaji		Traditional			October 20, 2012	110 minutes
Gekijō-ban Tiger & Bunny -The Beginning	Japan			Traditional			September 22, 2012	90 minutes
GG Bond: Hatching	China	Gu Zhibin	WinSing	Computer			June 28, 2012	83 minutes
Gladiators of Rome; Gladiatori di Roma	Italy	Iginio Straffi	Rainbow S.p.A. (Viacom)	Computer			October 18, 2012	95 minutes
Goat Story 2 Kozí příběh se sýrem	Czech Republic	Jan Tománek	Art And Animation studio	Computer			October 25, 2012	85 minutes
Gothicmade 花の詩女 ゴティックメード (Hana no Utame Gothicmade)	Japan	Mamoru Nagano		Traditional			November 1, 2012	70 minutes
The Grow	China			Traditional			December 29, 2012	88 minutes
Guide of Tormes; El Lazarillo de Tormes	Spain	Juan Bautista Berasategi	Lotura Films	Flash			2012	
Gummibär: The Yummy Gummy Search for Santa	United States; Germany	Bernie Denk; Jürgen Korduletsch	Lionsgate	Computer			September 6, 2012 (TIFF); October 8, 2012 (United Kingdom); November 6, 2012 (United States)	61 minutes
Hajimari no Monogatari	Japan			Traditional			October 6, 2012	130 minutes
Heart String Marionette	United States	M dot Strange	M dot Strange	Computer			June 15, 2012	121 minutes
Hey Krishna कृष्णा और कंस (Krishna Aur Kans)	India	Vikram Veturi	Reliance Entertainment	Flash			August 3, 2012	117 minutes
Hotel Transylvania	United States	Genndy Tartakovsky	Sony Pictures Animation	Computer		Theatrical	September 8, 2012 (TIFF); September 28, 2012	91 minutes
I Love Wolffy	China	Feng Zhu	Mr. Cartoon Pictures; Creative Power Entertaining; BestTV Media; Beijing Kaku Media; Hunan TV Aniworld Satellite TV; Pearl River Pictures; Shanghai Bright Pictures	Computer / Live action			August 10, 2012	91 minutes
Ice Age: Continental Drift	United States	Steve Martino; Mike Thurmeier	Blue Sky Studios	Computer		Theatrical	July 13, 2012	88 minutes
The Illusionauts; Los Ilusionautas	Peru	Eduardo Schuldt	Aronnax Animation Studios	Computer			January 26, 2012	82 minutes
Inazuma Eleven GO vs. Danbōru Senki W	Japan		OLM, Inc.	Traditional			December 1, 2012	90 minutes
Inspector Martin and the Gang of Snails; Inspektor Martin i banda puževa	Croatia	Igor Lepčin		Traditional			May 31, 2012	82 minutes
It's Such a Beautiful Day	United States	Don Hertzfeldt	Bitter Films	Traditional			August 24, 2012	62 minutes
Ivan the Incredible; Gummi T	Denmark	Michael Hegner	Crone Film	Computer			May 16, 2012	80 minutes
Justice League: Doom	United States	Lauren Montgomery	Warner Bros. Animation; Warner Premiere; DC Entertainment	Traditional		Direct-to-video	February 28, 2012	77 minutes
Kirikou and the Men and Women; Kirikou et les Hommes et les Femmes	France	Michel Ocelot	Les Armateurs; Mac Guff Ligne; France 3 Cinéma; Studio O	Computer			October 3, 2012	89 minutes
Legend of the Moles: The Treasure of Scylla	China	Liu Kexin		Traditional			July 5, 2012	95 minutes
A Liar's Autobiography: The Untrue Story of Monty Python's Graham Chapman	United Kingdom	Bill Jones; Ben Timlett; Jeff Simpson	Bill and Ben Productions	Computer / Traditional / Cutout			September 8, 2012 (TIFF); February 8, 2013	85 minutes
Library War: The Wings of Revolution 図書館戦争 革命のつばさ (Toshokan Sensō Kakumei no Tsubasa)	Japan	Takayuki Hamana	Production I.G	Traditional			June 5, 2012 (Tokyo); June 16, 2012	105 minutes
The Life of Guskou Budori グスコーブドリの伝記 (Guskō Budori no Denki)	Japan	Gisaburō Sugii	Tezuka Productions	Traditional			July 7, 2012	108 minutes
The Lorax	United States	Chris Renaud; Kyle Balda	Illumination Entertainment	Computer		Theatrical	March 2, 2012	86 minutes
Macross FB 7: Ore no Uta o Kike!	Japan	Tetsurō Amino	Satelight	Traditional			October 20, 2012	90 minutes
Madagascar 3: Europe's Most Wanted	United States	Tom McGrath; Eric Darnell; Conrad Vernon	DreamWorks Animation; PDI/DreamWorks	Computer		Theatrical	May 18, 2012 (Cannes Film Festival); June 8, 2012	93 minutes
Magical Girl Lyrical Nanoha The Movie 2nd A's 魔法少女リリカルなのは The MOVIE 2nd A's (Magical Girl Lyrical Nanoha The Movie 2nd A's)	Japan		Seven Arcs	Traditional			July 14, 2012	150 minutes
Magic Tree House マジック・ツリーハウス	Japan	Hiroshi Nishikiori	Ajia-do Animation Works	Traditional			October 23, 2011 (Tokyo Film Festival); January 7, 2012	105 minutes
Marco Macaco	Denmark	Jan Rahbek	Nice Ninja	Computer			September 13, 2012 (BUSTER Copenhagen International Film Festival for Children and Youth); October 11, 2012	80 minutes
Marx Reloaded	Germany	Jason Barker	Films Noirs; Medea Film; ZDF	Flash / Live action			April 11, 2011 (Germany, France); February 10, 2012 (United Kingdom); September 1, 2012 (United States)	52 minutes
Mass Effect: Paragon Lost	Japan			Traditional			November 29, 2012 (Limited theatrical release); December 14, 2012 (Digital release)	84 minutes
A Monster Christmas	United States	Chad Van De Keere	Kickstart Productions	Computer		Direct-to-video	October 23, 2012	43 minutes
Moon Man; Der Mondmann	Germany; France; Ireland	Stephan Schesch	Schesch Filmkreation production Le Pacte; Cartoon Saloon	Traditional			June 8, 2012 (Annecy); March 14, 2013 (Germany)	65 minutes
Nerawareta Gakuen ねらわれた学園	Japan	Ryosuke Nakamura	Sunrise	Traditional			October 2012 (Scotland Loves Animation); November 10, 2012	110 minutes
Niji-Iro Hotaru: Eien no Natsu Yasumi 虹色ほたる～永遠の夏休み～	Japan	Kōnosuke Uda	Toei Animation	Traditional			May 19, 2012	104 minutes
Niko 2: Family Affairs; Niko 2 – lentäjäveljekset Niko – Kleines Rentier, großer Held	Finland; Denmark; Germany; Ireland; Estonia	Kari Juusonen; Jorgen Lerdam	Anima Vitae; Cinemaker; A. Film A/S; Ulysses; Magma Films	Computer			October 12, 2012 (Finland); August 9, 2013 (Japan)	79 minutes
One Piece Film Z	Japan	Tatsuya Nagamine	Toei Animation	Traditional			December 15, 2012	107 minutes
The Outback	South Korea; United States	Kyung Ho Lee	Lotte Entertainment; The Animation Picture Company; Digiart Production; Stonebridge Capital; MVP Capital	Computer			January 12, 2012	85 minutes
An Oversimplification of Her Beauty	United States	Terence Nance		Mixed			January 21, 2012 (Sundance Film Festival)	93 minutes
ParaNorman	United States	Sam Fell; Chris Butler	Laika	Stop motion			August 3, 2012 (Mexico); August 17, 2012	92 minutes
Peixonauta – Agente Secreto da O.S.T.R.A.	Brazil	Célia Catunda and Kiko Mistrorig	TV PinGuim	Traditional / Flash			November 9, 2012	95 minutes
Pinocchio	Italy; France; Belgium; Luxembourg	Enzo D'Alò	2d3D Animations; Cometa Film; Iris Productions; Walking the dog	Traditional			August 20, 2012 (Venice); March 21, 2013 (Italy)	84 minutes
The Pirates! In an Adventure with Scientists!	United Kingdom; United States	Peter Lord	Aardman Animations; Sony Pictures Animation	Stop motion		Theatrical	March 28, 2012 (United Kingdom); April 27, 2012 (United States)	88 minutes
Pleasant Goat and Big Big Wolf: Mission Incredible: Adventures on the Dragon's Trail	China	William Kan; Yu Tak Wai; Mai Zhicheng; Huang Xiaoxue; Chen Hui Yan	Toonmax Media; Creative Power Entertaining; UYoung Culture & Media	Traditional			January 12, 2012	87 minutes
Pokémon the Movie: Kyurem vs. the Sword of Justice 劇場版ポケットモンスター ベストウイッシュ キュレムVS聖剣士 ケルディオ (Gekijōban Poketto Monsutā Besuto Uisshu Kyuremu tai Seikenshi Kerudio)	Japan	Kunihiko Yuyama	OLM, Inc.	Traditional			July 14, 2012	71 minutes
Pretty Cure All Stars New Stage: Friends of the Future プリキュアオールスターズ New Stage みらいのともだち (PuriKyua Ōru Sutāzu Nyū Sutēji: Mirai no Tomodachi)	Japan		Toei Animation	Traditional			March 17, 2012	70 minutes
Rise of the Guardians	United States	Peter Ramsey	DreamWorks Animation	Computer		Theatrical	October 10, 2012 (Mill Valley Film Festival); November 21, 2012	97 minutes
Road to Ninja: Naruto the Movie	Japan	Hayato Date	Studio Pierrot	Traditional			July 28, 2012	109 minutes
Rodencia y el Diente de la Princesa	Argentina; Peru	David Bisbano	Red Post Studio; Vista Sur Films S.r.l.	Computer			October 11, 2012 (Peru)	87 minutes
Scooby-Doo! Music of the Vampire	United States	David Block	Warner Bros. Animation	Traditional		Direct-to-video	March 13, 2012	76 minutes
Secret of the Wings	United States	Bradley Raymond	Disneytoon Studios	Computer			August 16, 2012 (Ukraine); August 31, 2012 (limited); October 23, 2012 (DVD release)	75 minutes
Seer 2	China	Wang Zhangjun, Fu Jie	Mr.Cartoon Pictures Shanghai Taomee Network Technology Ltd. EE-Media; Hunan Aniworld Satellite TV; 37 Entertainment; China Film Co., Ltd.	Computer			June 28, 2012	90 minutes
Selkirk, the Real Robinson Crusoe; Selkirk el verdadero Robinson Crusoe	Uruguay; Argentina; Chile	Walter Tournier	Tournier Animación	Stop motion			February 2, 2012	80 minutes
Sir Billi: Guardian of the Highlands	Scotland	Sascha Hartmann	Glasgow Animation; Billi Productions	Computer			April 13, 2012 (Sonoma International Film Festival); September 13, 2013 (United Kingdom)	80 minutes
The Snow Queen; Снежная королева	Russia	Maxim Sveshnikov; Vladlen Barbe	Wizart Animation; InlayFilm; Bazelevs Company	Computer			December 31, 2012	74 minutes
Sprookjesboom de Film	Netherlands	Hans Walther	Motek Entertainment; Efteling	Computer			February 22, 2012	72 minutes
The Star Making Machine; La máquina que hace estrellas	Argentina	Esteban Echeverría	Nut's Studio; Aleph Media	Computer			August 4, 2012 (Festival de Invierno de Cinemateca); August 30, 2012	80 minutes
Starship Troopers: Invasion	United States; Japan	Shinji Aramaki	Sola Digital Arts	Computer			July 21, 2012 (Japan); August 28, 2012 (United States)	89 minutes
Strange Frame: Love & Sax	United States	G.B. Hajim	Island Planet One Productions	Cutout			May 3, 2012 (Sci-Fi-London)	98 minutes
Strike Witches ストライクウィッチーズ (Sutoraiku Witchīzu)	Japan	Kazuhiro Takamura	AIC	Computer / Traditional			March 17, 2012	97 minutes
The Suicide Shop; Le Magasin des suicides	France	Patrice Leconte	Flagrant Délit Productions; Diabolo Films	Traditional / Flash			May 24, 2012 (Cannes); September 26, 2012 (France & Belgium)	79 minutes
Superman vs The Elite	United States	Michael Chang	Warner Premiere; DC Entertainment; Warner Bros. Animation	Traditional		Direct-to-video	June 12, 2012	76 Minutes
The Swan Princess Christmas	United States	Richard Rich	Nest Family Entertainment; StreetLight Animation Productions	Computer			November 6, 2012	83 minutes
Ted	United States	Seth MacFarlane	Media Rights Capital; Fuzzy Door Productions; Bluegrass Films; Smart Entertainment	Computer / Live action		Theatrical	June 29, 2012	106 minutes
Tad, The Lost Explorer; Las aventuras de Tadeo Jones	Spain	Enrique Gato	Telecinco Cinema; El Toro Pictures; Lightbox Entertainment; Ikiru Films; Telefónica Studios; Media Networks	Computer			June 5, 2012 (AIAFF); August 31, 2012; April 21, 2013 (United States)	92 minutes
Tom and Jerry: Robin Hood and His Merry Mouse	United States	Spike Brandt, Tony Cervone	Warner Premiere; Turner Entertainment Co. Warner Bros. Animation	Traditional		Direct-to-video	September 28, 2012	58 minutes
Three Heroes on Distant Shores	Russia	Konstantin Feoktistov	Melnitsa Animation Studio	Traditional			December 27, 2012	65 minutes
War of the Worlds: Goliath	United States; Malaysia	Joe Pearson	Tripod Entertainment	Computer / Traditional			November 15, 2012	82 minutes
Where the Dead Go to Die	United States	Jimmy ScreamerClauz	Chainsaw Kiss; Draconian Films	Computer			February 21, 2012	95 minutes
Wings; От винта 3D	Russia	Olga Lopato	Paradiz Prodakshnz	Computer			August 19, 2012; November 26, 2013 (United States)	100 minutes
The Wolf Children Ame and Yuki おおかみこどもの雨と雪 (Ōkami Kodomo no Ame to Yuki)	Japan	Mamoru Hosoda	Studio Chizu	Traditional			June 25, 2012 (France); July 21, 2012	117 minutes
Wreck-It Ralph	United States	Rich Moore	Walt Disney Animation Studios	Computer		Theatrical	October 29, 2012 (El Capitan Theatre); November 2, 2012	101 minutes
Yak: The Giant King	Thailand	Chaiporn Panichrutiwong; Prapas Cholsaranont	Workpoint Entertainment; Sahamongkol Film International; Ittirit House; Superjeew Event Co., Ltd.	Computer			October 4, 2012	96 minutes
Yugo & Lala	China	Wang Yunfei		Computer			August 10, 2012	87 minutes
Zambezia	South Africa	Wayne Thornley	Triggerfish Animation Studios; Wonderful Works; 120dB Films	Computer			July 3, 2012	82 minutes
Zarafa	France	Rémi Bezançon; Jean-Christophe Lie	Pathé; Prima Linea Productions; France 3 Cinéma; Chaocorp; Scope Pictures	Traditional			February 8, 2012	78 minutes

== Highest-grossing films ==
The following is a list of the 10 highest-grossing animated feature films first released in 2012.

Highest-grossing animated films of 2012
Rank	Title	Studio	Worldwide gross
1	Ice Age: Continental Drift	20th Century Fox / Blue Sky Studios	$879,765,137
2	Madagascar 3: Europe's Most Wanted	Paramount / DreamWorks	$746,921,274
3	Brave	Disney / Pixar	$554,606,532
4	Wreck-It Ralph	Disney / Walt Disney Animation Studios	$496,511,521
5	Hotel Transylvania	Columbia / Sony Pictures Animation	$378,223,189
6	Dr. Seuss' The Lorax	Universal / Illumination Entertainment	$348,840,316
7	Rise of the Guardians	Paramount / DreamWorks	$306,941,670
8	The Pirates! In an Adventure with Scientists!	Sony Pictures Animation / Aardman Animations	$123,054,041
9	ParaNorman	Focus Features	$107,139,399
10	Frankenweenie	Disney / Tim Burton Productions	$81,491,068

== See also ==
- List of animated television series of 2012
