= Pleasant Goat and Big Big Wolf: Dunk for Future 2 =

2027 Chinese film

- Simplified Chinese: 喜羊羊与灰太狼之筐出未来2
- Hanyu Pinyin: Xǐ Yángyáng Yǔ Huī Tàiláng Zhī Kuāng Chū Wèilái 2
- Directed by: Huang Weiming; Huang Junming
- Based on: Pleasant Goat and Big Big Wolf by Huang Weiming
- Starring: Zu Qing; Zhang Lin; Deng Yuting; Liu Hongyun; Liang Ying; Gao Quansheng; Zhao Na
- Production companies: Alpha Group; Creative Power Entertaining
- Release date: 2027
- Country: China
- Language: Mandarin

Pleasant Goat and Big Big Wolf: Dunk for Future 2 (Chinese: 喜羊羊与灰太狼之筐出未来2; pinyin: Xǐ Yángyáng Yǔ Huī Tàiláng Zhī Kuāng Chū Wèilái 2) is an upcoming Chinese animated film based on animated television series Pleasant Goat and Big Big Wolf. It is a sequel to the Pleasant Goat and Big Big Wolf: Dunk for Future. It is preceded by Pleasant Goat and Big Big Wolf: Bright New Dawn (2025).

== Voice Cast ==
- Zu Qing
- Zhang Lin
- Deng Yuting
- Liu Hongyun
- Liang Ying
- Gao Quansheng
- Zhao Na

== Production ==
On July 16, 2026, Creative Power Entertaining and Alpha Group registered the copyright of Pleasant Goat and Big Big Wolf: Dunk for Future 2 through the Guangdong Copyright Network - Announcement of Copyright Registration of Works.

== Release ==
The film was officially announced on May 29, 2026 through a pre-show teaser included in the theatrical prints of the re-release of Dunk for Future, which revealed a scheduled release window for 2027.
