= Mission Incredible: Adventures on the Dragon's Trail =

2012 animated film

- Film poster
- Chinese: 喜羊羊与灰太狼之开心闯龙年
- Directed by: William Kan; Yu Tak Wai; Mai Zhicheng; Huang Xiaoxue; Chen Hui Yan
- Written by: Wang Shu; Wu Chaowei
- Based on: Pleasant Goat and Big Big Wolf by Huang Weiming
- Produced by: Xu Hao; So Sze Wai; Yu Jie; Li Lisi; Xing Ying
- Edited by: Chen Shengrui
- Music by: Tomy Wai
- Production companies: Toonmax Media; Creative Power Entertaining; UYoung Culture & Media
- Distributed by: Shanghai Film Group; Polybona Films; Zhujiang Film Group; Intercontinental Film Distributors (H.K.); Deltamac (Taiwan)
- Release dates: 12 January 2012 (China); 9 February 2012 (Hong Kong)
- Running time: 87 minutes
- Country: Mainland China
- Languages: Mandarin; Cantonese; Korean
- Budget: CN¥40 million
- Box office: CN¥167.619 million (Mainland China); NT$2,100,000 (Taiwan); HK$640.1 thousand (Hong Kong)

Pleasant Goat and Big Big Wolf: Mission Incredible: Adventures on the Dragon's Trail (Chinese: 喜羊羊与灰太狼之开心闯龙年; pinyin: Xǐ Yángyáng Yǔ Huī Tàiláng zhī Kāixīn Chuǎng Lóngnián; lit. 'Pleasant/Happy Lamb/Goat and Grey Wolf's Happy Year of the Dragon') is a 2012 Chinese animated film based on the animated television series Pleasant Goat and Big Big Wolf. It is preceded by Moon Castle: The Space Adventure (2011) and is followed by The Mythical Ark: Adventures in Love & Happiness (2013).

In the film, Weslie and his crew discover an evil mechanical dragon who defeats Wolffy as he was attempting to capture the goats, but a series of good dragons rescue Weslie and the goats. The good dragons say that evil dragons have taken over their world, and they need the help of the goats.

== Characters ==
=== Lambs ===
- Weslie (喜羊羊 Xǐ Yángyáng) - Zu Liqing (祖丽晴) in Mandarin
- Slowy (慢羊羊 Màn Yángyáng) - Gao Quansheng (高全胜) in Mandarin
- Tibbie (美羊羊 Měi Yángyáng) - Deng Yuting (邓玉婷) in Mandarin
- Paddi (懒羊羊 Lǎn Yángyáng) - Liang Ying (梁颖) in Mandarin
- Sparky (沸羊羊 Fèi Yángyáng) - Liu Hongyun (刘红韵) in Mandarin
- Jonie (暖羊羊 Nuǎn Yángyáng) - Deng Yuting in Mandarin

=== Wolves ===
- Wolffy (灰太狼 Huī Tàiláng) - Zhang Lin (张琳) in Mandarin
- Wolnie (红太狼 Hóng Tàiláng) - Zhao Na in Mandarin
- Wilie (小灰灰 Xiǎo Huīhuī) - Liang Ying in Mandarin

=== Dragons ===
- Chamelon [sic] (变色龙 Biànsèlóng "Chameleon") - Liu Hongyun in Mandarin
- Molle (轰龙龙 Hōng Lónglóng "Red Dragon")
- Orito (钻地龙 Zuāndì Lóng "Drill Earth Dragon")
- Quinto (朦朦龙 Méngméng Lóng "Deceive Dragon")
- Raho (七窍玲龙 Qīqiàolíng Lóng "No Human Head Feature (Eye, ear, nostril, mouth) Dragon")
- Drago (小黑龙 Xiǎo Hēilóng "Little Black Dragon")
  - Drago appears as an innocent victim of the Tyranno-Rex, but he turns out to be the operator of it.
- Xiao Shen Long (小神龙 Xiǎo Shénlóng "Little Divine/Mysterious Dragon") - Luo Yanqian (骆妍倩) in Mandarin
  - Xiao Shen Long teaches the goats and the wolves kung fu. The placement of Xiao Shen Long, a dragon who knows kung fu, was made, according to The Standard, "to maximize monetization potentials." The Walt Disney Company and Toon Express made an agreement to share licensing income generated from sales of merchandise with Xiao Shen Long for a three-year period.
- Archaeo (蝶龙 Diélóng "Butterfly Dragon")
