= Moon Castle: The Space Adventure =

- Poster
- Chinese: 喜羊羊与灰太狼之兔年顶呱呱
- Directed by: Chung Chi Hang; Yu Tak Wai; Deng Shikang; Huang Xiaoxue; Chen Hui Yan
- Written by: Shi Jianna; Zhong Zhengliang; Mai Zhicheng
- Based on: Pleasant Goat and Big Big Wolf by Huang Weiming
- Produced by: Chen Liang; Lou Wing Keng; Yu Jie; Li Lisi; Xing Ying
- Edited by: Zhang Heng
- Music by: Tomy Wai
- Production companies: Toonmax Media; Creative Power Entertaining; UYoung Culture & Media
- Distributed by: China Film Group Corporation; Shanghai Film Group; Polybona Films; Mei Ah Entertainment; Intercontinental Film Distributors (H.K.); Buena Vista Home Entertainment
- Release dates: 21 January 2011 (China); 21 April 2011 (Hong Kong)
- Running time: 87 minutes
- Country: China
- Languages: Mandarin; Cantonese
- Budget: CN¥20 million
- Box office: CN¥139.25 million

Pleasant Goat and Big Big Wolf – Moon Castle: The Space Adventure (喜羊羊与灰太狼之兔年顶呱呱 Xǐ Yáng Yáng yǔ Huī Tài Láng zhī tùnián dǐngguāguā "Pleasant Goat and Grey Wolf's Excellent Year of the Rabbit") is a 2011 Chinese animated comedy film directed by Sung Pong Choo and part of the film series based on the Pleasant Goat and Big Big Wolf animated television series. The film was released on January 21, 2011. It is preceded by Pleasant Goat and Big Big Wolf: The Tiger Prowess (2010) and is followed by Mission Incredible: Adventures on the Dragon's Trail (2012).

== Plot ==
The plot follows the goats, who go to the Moon in a candy-shaped spaceship in order to assist the Queen of the Moon. The Bitter Gourd King and his gourd troopers are attacking the World of Sweetness with bitter juice, and the Queen needs the help of the goats. Wolfie and his family come with the goats by accident. At one point the Gourd King kidnaps Wolfie's family, and Weslie comes to tears upon seeing his parents.

The movie also references Yang Liwei, a Chinese astronaut, in the early part of the movie.

== Voice cast ==
- Lin Zhang
- Yuting Deng
- Ying Liang
- Hongyun Liu
- Quansheng Gao
- Na Zhao

The Cantonese version of the film has a voice cast including Michael Tse, Kate Tsui and Evergreen Mak Cheung-ching.

== Production ==
The film emphasizes the importance of family. Yu said "Unlike the mostly fun plots in the previous two sequels, we play up the love theme this time."

== Release ==
The film was scheduled to be released on Friday January 28, 2011, in Mainland China. Yu Tak-wai, the creative director of Creative Power Entertaining, stated that the film was scheduled to be released in Hong Kong, Macau, and Taiwan later during the year 2011. It was released in China on January 21, 2011, during the Chinese New Year.

== Reception ==
=== Box office ===
A 2011 China Daily article stated that the film was predicted to make over 150 million yuan ($25 million US). The film earned CN¥139.250 million at the Chinese box office.

== Awards ==
In 2011, the movie was shortlisted for the Magnolia Award at the 17th Shanghai Television Festival.
