= The Mythical Ark: Adventures in Love & Happiness =

- Film poster
- Chinese: 喜羊羊与灰太狼之喜气羊羊过蛇年
- Directed by: William Kan; Huang Xiaoxue; Yu Tak Wai
- Written by: Shi Jianna; Wang Shu; Wu Chaowei; Li Binglin
- Based on: Pleasant Goat and Big Big Wolf by Huang Weiming
- Produced by: Xu Hao; Steven Yung; Yu Jie; Li Lisi; Xing Ying
- Edited by: Sun Caixia
- Music by: Tomy Wai
- Production companies: Toonmax Media; Creative Power Entertaining; UYoung Culture & Media
- Distributed by: Toonmax Media; Zhujiang Film Group; Shanghai Film Group; Wanda Media; Beijing Golden Harvest Entertainment; Intercontinental Film Distributors (H.K.)
- Release date: January 24, 2013 (Mainland China)
- Running time: 86 minutes
- Country: China
- Languages: Mandarin; Cantonese; Korean
- Budget: CN¥27.3 million
- Box office: CN¥124.937 million (US$20.7 million) (Mainland China); HK$1.01 million (Hong Kong)

The Mythical Ark: Adventures in Love & Happiness (Chinese: 喜羊羊与灰太狼之喜气羊羊过蛇年) is a 2013 Chinese animated film part of the film series based on the animated television series Pleasant Goat and Big Big Wolf. It is preceded by Mission Incredible: Adventures on the Dragon's Trail (2012) and is followed by Meet the Pegasus (2014).

== Plot ==
Wolffy invents "weather control" to capture the goats, but ends up losing control of wind, rain, thunder and lightning. Thereby, Green-Green Grassland suffers a lot from the changeable weather. In order to initiate the ark to take the Green-Green Grassland residents away from disaster, the goats start their journey of finding a snake tribe that has been missing for a thousand years. It takes them a while to notice that their new friend Bieber is the exact extinct snake. Luckily, the tribes work together to solve the weather chaos despite their differences and save the Green-Green Grassland.

== Characters ==
- Weslie- Zu Liqing
- Slowy - Gao Quansheng
- Tibbie- Deng Yuting
- Paddi - Liang Ying
- Sparky- Liu Hongyun
- Biber - Liu Hongyun
- Wolnie - Zhao Na
- Jonie - Deng Yuting
- Snake dad - Chen Yi
- Snake mom - Deng Yuting
- Wilie - Liang Ying
- Wolffy - Zhang Lin
- Bill - Zhao Ran

== Reception ==
The film grossed RMB125 million (US$20.7 million) at the Chinese box office.
