= Pleasant Goat and Big Big Wolf: The Super Adventure =

- Poster
- Simplified Chinese: 喜羊羊与灰太狼之牛气冲天
- Traditional Chinese: 喜羊羊與灰太狼之牛氣沖天
- Hanyu Pinyin: Xǐ Yáng Yáng yǔ Huī Tài Láng Zhī Niúqi Chōngtiān
- Directed by: Choo Sung Pong James; William Kan; Chen Hui Yan; Tan Shujun
- Written by: Huang Weijian; Ni Xiaohong; Li Binglin
- Based on: Pleasant Goat and Big Big Wolf by Huang Weiming
- Produced by: Chen Liang; Lou Wing Keng; Wang Lei; Li Lisi; Xing Ying
- Edited by: Chen Shengrui
- Music by: Tomy Wai
- Production companies: Shanghai Media Group; Creative Power Entertaining; UYoung Culture & Media
- Distributed by: Polybona Films; Shanghai Film Group; Guangdong Film Company; Intercontinental Film Distributors (H.K.)
- Release dates: January 16, 2009 (Mainland China); August 27, 2009 (Hong Kong)
- Running time: 85 minutes
- Country: China
- Languages: Mandarin; Cantonese
- Budget: CN¥6 million
- Box office: CN¥82.8/CN¥90 million

Pleasant Goat and Big Big Wolf: The Super Adventure (Chinese: 喜羊羊与灰太狼之牛气冲天), is a 2009 Chinese animated children's comedy film directed by Sung Pong Choo and William Kan. The film was released on January 16, 2009, close to the Chinese New Year holiday. It is the first installment in a series of films based on the popular Pleasant Goat and Big Big Wolf animated television series and was followed by Pleasant Goat and Big Big Wolf: The Tiger Prowess a year later.

With a gross of over ¥80 million, The Super Adventure became the highest-grossing Chinese animated film at the time of its release, surpassing the previous record-holder, Storm Rider Clash of the Evils. Its record was surpassed in 2010 by its sequel, The Tiger Prowess.

== Plot ==
The goats found a sick snail in their village and decided to help it. Using a miniature spray, they shrank themselves and entered the snail's body to treat it. However, Wolffy discovered their plan and, determined to catch the goats, shrank himself and followed them into the snail.

Inside the snail's body, they found it infested with bacteria. A dramatic conflict ensued between two opposing groups of bacteria: the white bacteria, allied with the goats, and the black bacteria, led by Wolffy. However, a third force emerged—a yellow bacterium that combined the strengths of both the black and white bacteria. Though powerful, the yellow bacterium was arrogant and dismissive of others, ultimately becoming the movie's primary antagonist.

In the end, the goats and Wolffy set aside their differences and worked together to defeat the yellow bacterium, overcoming its threat to save the snail.

== Voice cast ==
- Zu Liqung – Weslie
- Deng Yuting – Tibbie / Jonie / Peng qiaqia
- Liang Ying – Paddi / Wilie
- Liu Hongyun – Sparky
- Gao Quansheng – Slowy
- Zhang Lin – Wolffy
- Zhao Na – Wolnie
- Li Tuan – Old Mandy
- Mao Fangyuan – King Blacky
- Chen Zeyu – Dong Dongqiang
- Wu Diwen – Captain Black Bull
- Zhong Kai – Parastic Cow
- Ah Niu – King Whitty

== Release ==
The film was released on January 16, 2009. Liu Manyi, the general manager of Creative Power Entertaining, revealed that pirated copies of the film had already been distributed before its theatrical release.

=== Home media ===
The Super Adventure was released on DVD in China on February 16, 2009, one month after its theatrical debut. The DVD included Mandarin and Cantonese dubbing, along with English subtitles. A second edition of the DVD was released on March 4, 2009, featuring special content such as behind-the-scenes footage and a music video of the film's theme song, performed by Malaysian singer Ah Niu. Both editions were produced by the Shanghai Audio & Video Company.

== Reception ==
=== Box office ===
Francis Leung, an investment banker quoted in the Wall Street Journal, stated that the film generated 80 million yuan in revenue, setting box office records for films produced in Mainland China. However, an article in China Daily reported that the film earned 100 million yuan. According to cbooo.cn, the film's total box office revenue was CN¥82.793 million.

== Critical reception ==
Unlike the television series, the film introduces many new characters, and the primary villain is no longer Gray Wolf. Wolffy's inventions in the movie are more advanced, including a makeshift airplane, tanks, and the ability to shrink into large spheres. Additionally, the settings differ significantly from the TV series, with the film utilizing full 3D technology. The characters’ appearances have been updated with more vibrant colors and dazzling designs, while the visual effects are noticeably more sophisticated. (Sohu Entertainment)

== Accolades ==
The Super Adventure won the award for Outstanding Animation at the 13th China Huabiao Film Awards.

2011 Western Starlight "Pleasant Goat's Bull's Bounty" Most Promoting Movie Award

2010 Western China Animation and Culture Festival Best Feature Film Award for Outstanding Animation Works Award

2010 The Seventh Guangzhou Literary Award for Publicity and Cultural Excellence Award

2009 Best Cinema Animation, Golden Panda Award, Sichuan TV Festival Nomination

2009 The Eighth Guangdong Lu Xun Literature and Art Award

2009 The First China Animation Art Exhibition Nomination

2009 Best Animated Feature Film in the 6th Golden Dragon Award Original Cartoon Animation Art Competition Awards

2009 Outstanding Animated Film Award of the 13th Huabiao Awards Nomination
