= Pleasant Goat and Big Big Wolf: Desert Trek: The Adventure of the Lost Totem =

Pleasant Goat and Big Big Wolf – Desert Trek: The Adventure of the Lost Totem
- Poster
- Chinese: 喜羊羊与灰太狼之虎虎生威
- Directed by: Choo Sung Pong James; Yu Tak Wai; Deng Shikang; Tan Shujun; Huang Xiaoxue; Zhang Heng
- Written by: Huang Weijian; Chen Yiyong; Ni Xiaohong; Jiang Dan
- Based on: Pleasant Goat and Big Big Wolf by Huang Weiming
- Produced by: Chen Liang; Lou Wing Keng; Wang Lei; Li Lisi; Xing Ying
- Starring: Zu Liqing; Zhang Lin; Deng Yuting; Liang Ying; Liu Hongyun; Gao Quansheng
- Edited by: Zhang Heng; Chen Shengrui
- Music by: Tomy Wai
- Production companies: Shanghai Media Group; Creative Power Entertaining; UYoung Culture & Media; Toonmax Media
- Distributed by: Shanghai Film Group; Mei Ah Entertainment; Polybona Films; China Film Group Corporation; Intercontinental Film Distributors (H.K.); Gold Typhoon Music
- Release date: January 29, 2010
- Running time: 88 minutes
- Country: China
- Languages: Mandarin; Cantonese
- Budget: CN¥12 million
- Box office: CN¥124.38 million

Pleasant Goat and Big Big Wolf – Desert Trek: The Adventure of the Lost Totem (Chinese: 喜羊羊与灰太狼之虎虎生威; pinyin: Xǐ Yángyáng Yǔ Huī Tàiláng Zhī Hǔhǔ Shēngwēi; lit. 'Pleasant Goat and Big Big Wolf: The Tiger Prowess'), is a 2010 Chinese animated film based on the popular Pleasant Goat and Big Big Wolf TV series. It is preceded by Pleasant Goat and Big Big Wolf: The Super Adventure (2009) and is followed by Moon Castle: The Space Adventure (2011).

== Synopsis ==
Gecko Counselor and Lord Japper attack the Goat Village with plans to build an amusement park, intending to turn the Wolf Castle, which is home to Wolffy, Wolnie and Wilie, into a public toilet. To save their captured families from the fierce animal gang and robot soldiers, Weslie and Wolffy must work together to find the legendary statues that protected their ancestors.

== Plot ==
In order to commemorate the thousandth anniversary of the invention of Chinese cabbage, a party was held in the Goats Village in the evening. However at the same time, the one-thousandth anniversary of the invention of the mutton hotpot has arrived in the wolf pack, in order to achieve the goal, the wolves decided to catch the goats from Goats Village to make mutton hotpot that night. Unexpectedly, when the party started in the Goats Village, other than Wolffy, an uninvited guest appeared, and that was Lord Japper. With the rights of the president of the International Animal Council, he planned to convert the Green Green Grassland including the Goats Village into an amusement park, even the Wolf Castle was converted into a public toilet. Moreover, the residents in the Green Green Grassland were forced to work as employees of the amusement park and the residents were only given two hours to rest each day. So Weslie and Wolffy decided to look for the legendary invincible totem under the instructions of Slowy, the village chief of the Goats Village.

== Theme songs ==
- "Dajia Yiqi Xiyangyang" (lit. 'Let's "Weslie" Together') by Bibi Zhou
- "Zuoshou Youshou" (lit. 'Left Hand', 'Right Hand') by Yang Peiyi
- "Wo Ai Pingdiguo" (lit. 'I Love Frying Pan') by Ronald Cheng

== Voice cast ==
- Zu Liqing - Weslie
- Deng Yuting - Tibbie / Jonie
- Liang Ying - Paddi / Wilie
- Liu Hongyun - Sparky
- Gao Quansheng - Slowy
- Zhang Lin - Wolffy
- Zhao Na - Wolnie
- Jia Yi - Lord Japper
- Guo Yu - Gecko Counselor
- Chip Tsao - Sphinx Wolf
- Shi An - Sphinx Goat
- Huang Xuming - Cool Leopold

== Marketing ==
=== Mainland China ===
In order to boost the box office for the film, one of the production companies: Shanghai Media Group arranged a special marketing promotion. For those who bought the film tickets may have a chance to get a special game card and a limited edition "mystery gift", which includes a limited edition Pleasant Goat Year of the Tiger plush toy, a limited edition Big Big Wolf Year of the Tiger plush toy and the film DVD.

=== Hong Kong ===
Vinda International, a Chinese tissue paper production company co-branded with Pleasant Goat and Big Big Wolf produce tissue paper products with image of Pleasant Goat on it. Furthermore, in order to boost the sales and promote its brand, Vinda also held a Peasant Goat movie tickets lucky draw for those who bought Vinda products.

== Reception ==
In mainland China, the box office has received over ten million Renminbi in just one day after the movie released, while it received over forty-five million Renminbi in one week.

Overall, the film had received a total revenues of 124.38 million yuan.

Although the film made a sound profit in the box office, the brand of “Pleasant Goat and Big Big Wolf” became famous over mainland China, the main production company of the film: Creative Power Entertaining could not cover the cost as its revenue is much lower than the box office. Moreover, the sales content-based derivative products is lower than the company's expected due to lots of fake derivative products in China market and lacking copyright protection.

== Critical reception ==
Pleasant Goat and Big Big Wolf's Tiger and Tiger's Might is an improvement over Pleasant Goat's first Chinese New Year film The Bull's Breath in terms of production standard, plot arrangement and funny dialogues. The movie relies on the magic weapon of fame - sheep and wolves are entangled between the plot and dialogues are still hilarious, and the 2009 popular phrases spoken by the sheep and wolves are more than a laugh, almost every three minutes a laughing point. The twists and turns of the plot and the emotions are on point, and the biggest change is that the sheep and the wolf are no longer enemies and are fighting side by side for the first time ever. (Sina.com review)

== Awards ==
Pleasant Goat and Big Big Wolf: Desert Trek: The Adventure of the Lost Totem has won "The Best Chinese Animation Award" in the 16th Magnolia Awards; the film has also won the "Best Animated Feature Film Award" in "Golden Dragon Award Original Animation & Comic Competition" (OACC).

Sky Animation Wind and Cloud Ranking, Top Ten Animation Works of the Year, Wind and Cloud Events of the Year

December 15, 2010 China Animation Annual Conference 2010 Film and Animation Box Office Award
