= Pleasant Goat and Big Big Wolf – Amazing Pleasant Goat =

- Chinese: 喜羊羊与灰太狼之羊年喜羊羊
- Directed by: Huang Weiming; Huang Xiaoxue; Qing Tian
- Written by: Wu Chaowei; Guo Peng; Shi Jianna; Liu Lifan; Ou Ling; Li Disi; Zeng Lingling; Huang Weiming
- Based on: Pleasant Goat and Big Big Wolf by Huang Weiming
- Produced by: Wang Tianyun; Zhang Fan; Li Xia; Xu Chengyong; Yang Yibin; Zhang Zhibin
- Edited by: Sun Caixia
- Music by: Tomy Wai
- Production companies: Shanghai Film Group; Alpha Pictures Investment (Beijing); Creative Power Entertaining; Beijing TV Kaku Kids Channel; Jiangsu Youman Cartoon TV; Guangdong Jia-jia Cartoon Channel
- Distributed by: Shanghai Film Group; Alpha Pictures Investment (Beijing); Beijing Guolong Film Distributors
- Release dates: 31 January 2015 (China); 19 February 2015 (Hong Kong)
- Running time: 86 minutes
- Country: China
- Language: Mandarin
- Budget: CN¥36.8 million
- Box office: CN¥67.815 million HK$173.5 thousand

Pleasant Goat and Big Big Wolf – Amazing Pleasant Goat (Chinese: 喜羊羊与灰太狼之羊年喜羊羊) is a 2015 Chinese animated family fantasy adventure comedy film directed by Huang Weiming. It was released on January 31, 2015. Part of the film series based on the animated television series Pleasant Goat and Big Big Wolf. It is preceded by Meet the Pegasus (2014) and is followed by Pleasant Goat and Big Big Wolf: Dunk for Future (2022).

== Plot ==
Weslie and Paddi are good friends who are both dreaming to become "Dragon Slayer". However, in one day, they have arguments and Paddi goes to the wolf fortress in a fit of pique. Weslie goes there to rescue Paddi but they all end up traveling back to the ancient time in a turmoil. Paddi and Wolffy swap their bodies accidentally in the turmoil. But what's worse is that they meet a ferocious dragon that's able to turn creatures into rocks! Weslie and his friends bravely guard the ancient world and become dragon slayers. Paddi became the "Dragon Slayer" at the end, and Weslie and Paddi became friends again.

== Voice cast ==
- Zu Qing
- Zhang Lin
- Yang Wenchang
- Gao Quansheng
- Liang Ying
- Deng Yuting
- Liu Hongyun
- Zhao Na
- Li Tuan
- Cui Zige

== Release ==
The film was released on December 31, 2015, as part of the Chinese New Year slate, along Detective Chinatown.

== Reception ==
=== Box office ===
The film earned $162,600 CNY from previews. On its opening day, the film earned $14.83 million CNY, dropping dramatically on its third day from $11.24 million to $3.82 million CNY. The film had a three-day total of $28.9 million CNY and a five-day total of $37.14 million CNY. By February 5, the film had earned CN¥39.88 million at the Chinese box office. The film ended with a total gross of $67.81 million CNY, the lowest ever gross for a film of the franchise.
