= Toon Express Group =

Chinese company

Toon Express International Limited (TE Group, simplified Chinese: 动漫火车集团; traditional Chinese: 動漫火車集團; pinyin: Dòngmàn Huǒchē Jítuán) is a former operating division of Infoport Management Limited, which was headquartered in Kwun Tong, Kowloon, Hong Kong. Before Toon Express became a part of Imagi Animation Studios, Soh Szu Wei (蘇思偉; Sū Sīwěi) was the head of Toon Express. After the buyout he became the CEO and executive director of Imagi.

Toon Express owns the copyrights of the characters in Pleasant Goat and Big Big Wolf, a popular Chinese cartoon. As of 2011 the company had commercial agreements with Creative Power Entertaining and Disney Enterprises. During that year, Imagi International announced that it was buying Toon Express for up to 1.05 billion Hong Kong dollars, or $130 million U.S. dollars. Imagi acquired Infoport, which included Toon Express.
