= Pleasant Goat and Big Big Wolf =

Anime-influenced television series

- Simplified Chinese: 喜羊羊与灰太狼
- Traditional Chinese: 喜羊羊與灰太狼
- Literal meaning: Happy Goat with Grey Wolf
- Hanyu Pinyin: Xǐ Yángyáng yǔ Huī Tàiláng
- Jyutping: hei2 joeng4 joeng4 jyu5 fui1 taai3 long4
- Genre: Science fiction; Adventure; Comedy
- Created by: Huang Weiming
- Directed by: Creative Power Entertaining Directors Group
- Opening theme: Various
- Ending theme: Various
- Country of origin: China
- Original languages: Mandarin; Cantonese
- No. of seasons: 45
- No. of episodes: 3,207 (list of episodes)

Production
- Running time: Various
- Production company: Creative Power Entertaining

Original release
- Network: Zhejiang Television; CCTV; Aniworld Satellite Television; Xing Kong; Shaanxi Television
- Release: 3 August 2005 – present

Pleasant Goat and Big Big Wolf
- Simplified Chinese: 喜羊羊与灰太狼
- Traditional Chinese: 喜羊羊與灰太狼
- Literal meaning: Pleasant Goat and Big Grey Wolf
Transcriptions
Standard Mandarin
- Hanyu Pinyin: Xǐ Yángyáng yǔ Huī Tàiláng
Yue: Cantonese
- Jyutping: Héi2yêng4yêng4 Yü5 Fui1tai3long4

Pleasant Goat and Big Big Wolf (Note: Chinese: 喜羊羊与灰太狼; pinyin: Xǐ Yángyáng yǔ Huī Tàiláng; lit. 'Pleasant Goat and Big Grey Wolf') is a Chinese animated anime-influenced television series created by animation director Leo Huang and produced by Creative Power Entertaining. The show is about a group of goats living on the Green Green Grassland and a clumsy wolf who wants to eat them.

The cartoon became enormously popular with Chinese schoolchildren after its debut in 2005. Cashing in on the cartoon's success, the producer made an animated feature film in 2009, which generated a box office revenue of 79 million yuan (approx. US $11.5 million) during Chinese New Year that year.

Toon Express Group, a subsidiary of Alpha Animation and a Creative Power Entertaining's sister company, owns the copyrights to the characters.

== History ==
Pleasant Goat and Big Big Wolf had 510 episodes when it premiered (2005–2007). After it became moderately successful, Creative Power Entertaining created more than 3,000 episodes, including 60 exclusive Olympics episodes in 2008 and an addition of 20 more episodes to the first season in 2009.

The first season was made using Adobe Flash, an obsolete video player.

In January 2009, its first movie Pleasant Goat and Big Big Wolf – The Super Adventure was launched in China. Based on the 530-episode television series, The Super Adventure stars the same characters but in a very different scenario with the goats joining forces with their old nemesis, Wolffy, to defeat their common archenemy – bacteria. It broke the domestic box office record for a Chinese animated film, collecting 30 million yuan (US$4.39 million) during its opening weekend. On the first day of release alone, the movie made 8 million yuan. According to Beijing News, the weekend's revenue was well ahead of the previous record holder for domestic animation, Storm Rider Clash of the Evils – the adaptation of the Storm Riders comic brought in 25 million Yuan in two weeks when it was released the previous summer.

Describing the Pleasant Goat movie as a "dark horse", Zhao Jun, general manager of China Film South Cinema Circuit Co. Ltd., predicted the film would make at least 60 million yuan in total box office revenue. A manager of the Beijing-based Stellar International Cineplex said the movie theatre's biggest hall, which had been scheduled to screen Red Cliff II, was reassigned to show Pleasant Goat and Big Big Wolf: The Super Adventure in order to meet popular demand.

In 2010, a second movie, Desert Trek: The Adventure of the Lost Totem, was released. One of the original tracks in the movie, "Left hands and Right hands" (Chinese: 左手右手), was sung by Yang Peiyi, who had previously sung at the 2008 Summer Olympics Opening Ceremony.

In 2010, Creative Power Entertaining Corporation (CPE) said that it had reached a television license broadcast agreement with Disney affiliate Buena Vista to air its products. With this deal, the popular Chinese cartoon show for children will be aired on Disney channels in 52 countries and regions and in more than 10 different languages, marking a milestone for China's animation industry.

The third movie, Moon Castle: The Space Adventure was launched in 2011. The fourth movie Mission Incredible: Adventures on the Dragon's Trail followed in 2012. The fourth film reached the highest box office of the film series at 167.619 million yuan.

The fifth film, in 2013, was The Mythical Ark: Adventures in Love & Happiness, the sixth film in 2014 Meet the Pegasus, and the seventh film in 2015 Amazing Pleasant Goat. All seven movies are themed on the Chinese zodiac of the year in which it was released, and incorporate the zodiac animal in their Chinese names; the animals, sequentially, are the ox, tiger, rabbit, dragon, snake, horse, and goat. In addition, all movies were released in the month of January, around Chinese New Year. With the box office revenue of each film decreasing and Amazing Pleasant Goat only reaching 67.815 million yuan, CPE decided to slow down the yearly release. The ninth film, titled Pleasant Goat and Big Big Wolf 3D Movie, released in 2023.

Two live-action animated films of the series, titled I Love Wolffy and I Love Wolffy 2 respectively, were also released, but neither reached a box office of 80 million yuan. A third live-action animated film is not planned.

Investment banker Francis Leung, who planned to buy Toon Express Group, expressed the potential to make Pleasant Goat a television show that would, as stated by The Wall Street Journal, "parallel the popularity of Mickey Mouse and Hello Kitty".

== Premise ==
In the year 3010 on the fictional Goat Calendar, the ancestor of the goat clan, Ruan Mianmian (or Old Mandy), arrives at Green Green Grassland to escape the wolves. The goats built a tall iron gate outside their village and called it 'Goat Village'. This leaves the wolves to try and break in any way they can. One day, a wolf suggests that they exercise until they are thin enough to squeeze through the bars. With this strategy, the wolf ancestor, Wu Dalang (Fitter), manages to get through, only to die after swallowing a huge rock covered in wool, mistaking it for a big sheep. After this incident, the wolves learned not to make the goats of Green Green Grassland angry, for there will be consequences.

503 years later in the year 3513, the descendant of Wu Dalang, Wolffy, moves to the opposite of the river separating the forest and the Goat Village with his wife Wolnie. Wolffy demonstrates poor hunting ability and is scorned, being regarded as not a proper wolf. They move there in hope of finding a way to eat the goats, as tales told by ancestors say that the goats there are the best and tastiest.

The goats live in the Green Green Grassland happily. The main characters are depicted as school-aged goats that attend school under the tutelage of Slowy, the village elder. Weslie and his friends are portrayed as playful primary school kids, each of whom has his/her own unique characteristic. Tibbie is a fashionable young female goat who is always worrying about her looks and esteem. Sparky is a young male goat who likes to work out; he has a crush on Tibbie. Paddi is a cute male goat who likes to relax. Paddi is one of the most popular characters in the series. There are many other young, anonymous goats, as well as their teacher Slowy, an old goat referred to as the "Village Chief", who is a scientist and develops machines to protect their school. He is slower than a snail and uses a walking stick.

Wolffy and Wolnie live in a castle far from the village and are constantly trying to hunt the goats for food. However, the goats in this time are intelligent and powered with technology. Each episode, Wolffy concocts a plan to catch the goats. Among the goat students, a smart male goat named Weslie always finds a way to ruin Wolffy's plans and save the goats. With the effort of Weslie and his friends, Wolffy never captures any goats. At the end of each episode, Wolffy always promises to come back, each time shouting his catchphrase: 'Darn goats! I will definitely come back again!'

The conflict between Wolffy and Weslie never ends. Although Wolffy fails all the time, he never gives up. While he is mean to the goats, he is a nice and timid husband to Wolnie and a great dad to his son, Wilie. Wolnie is somewhat impatient and enjoys making her husband do all the work. She rarely tries to catch the goats herself (failing every time as well), but always yells at her husband. She likes fashion, is fixated on eating goats, and loves to hit Wolffy with her frying pan. Despite this fact, deep down Wolnie still loves her husband.

== Characters ==
Pleasant Goat and Big Big Wolf main characters from Explore Wolffy's Mind (from left to right): Top row: Willie; Middle row: Sparky and Paddi; Bottom row: Jonie, Tibbie, Weslie, Wolffy, Wolnie and Slowy.

=== Goats ===
Weslie (喜羊羊; Xǐ Yángyáng; 'Happy Sheep')

Voiced by: Zu Liqing
Weslie is the main protagonist of the series. He is a school-aged goat living in the Goat Village of Green Green Grassland and the son of singer Lily (丽羊羊). He wears a blue ribbon around his neck with a bell, which is a present from his parents. Weslie is an archetypal hero character; he is positive, intelligent, and always supportive of his friends. He takes a leadership role in his class and among his peers and is Slowy's assistant. Weslie is observant and intelligent, and in general, is the often the first to detect danger and see through Wolffy's plots and traps. He also seems to be quite calm and forgiving, as he forgives Wolffy and his family at the end of the first movie for betraying them by sending them a trap-gift. He loves to play pranks, much to his friends' agitation. He also enjoys being treated with offers by Tibbie. He and Wolffy become friends in the "Mighty Little Defenders".

Slowy (慢羊羊; Màn Yángyáng; 'Slow Sheep')

Voiced by: Gao Quansheng
Slowy is an adult goat that serves as a village elder. His name is pun on "slow and steady", implying that while slow, he also harbors a steady wisdom. He functions as the only adult figure in the story, and not only serving as the head of the lamb village, but also as the schoolmaster. He often uses trickery to teach his students valuable lessons about life, and often sends them on assignments. There is a small plant on top of his head that grows whenever he thinks. Outside of the school yard, he is shown as a goat of many pursuits, creating wacky inventions and performing questionable experiments with humorous results. In addition, when he thinks too hard, his head will begin to grow leaves.
His character design is partially inspired by Albert Einstein, with wild frizzy hair, a mustache, and a pair of spectacles.

Paddi (懒羊羊; Lǎn Yángyáng; 'Lazy Sheep')

Voiced by: Liang Ying
A small, gluttonous goat wearing a yellow drool bib. He hates working and likes to sleep, and due to his lazy nature, he is often the first caught by Wolffy. He is also very greedy and is often either sleeping or eating. Paddi is one of the most intelligent of all of the goats, although this is concealed by his laziness. He also has a habit of falling asleep whenever Wolffy kidnaps the goats. He is sometimes a bit selfish. He has been revealed to hold a varying number of hidden talents throughout the show, such as diving. Wolffy's son, Wilie, has an attachment to him, and will often address him as "Brother Paddi". Originally, Paddi was intended to be the main protagonist of the show, but due to "Lazy" having a negative connotation, Weslie was made the main protagonist instead.

Tibbie (美羊羊; Měi Yángyáng; 'Beautiful Sheep')

Voiced by: Deng Yuting
A female goat in Green Green Grassland, who always wears pink bows on her horns and pink shoes and a pink scarf with a white line. She is one of Slowy's students and is generally liked by all the goats in Green Green Grassland. Tibbie is shown to be the most emotional goat and often cries, needing to be calmed down by her friends. Tibbie is shown to dislike caterpillars, roaches, or bugs, but she likes applying make-up, cooking and crafting flower wreaths, attracting other animals to her beauty. Tibbie is usually gentle, kind, and sweet to her friends, but is serious when she is angry. Her best friend is Jonie and likes to do various activities with her, such as dressing up in pretty clothes.

Sparky (沸羊羊; Fèi Yángyáng; 'Boiling Sheep')

Voiced by: Liu Hongyun, Yan Yanzi
Sparky is the only dark-skinned goat. He is a school-aged goat that attends the same school as Weslie. Sparky is depicted as a jock character. He is the strongest of his group and enjoys sports and showing off his strength to others. He is quick-tempered and quick to act, often charging headlong into dangerous situations. He likes to pick on Paddi, but occasionally still treats him as a friend. Sparky's best friend is Weslie and likes to help him get rid of Wolffy when he tries to attack the goats. Despite his strength, he is still physically weaker than Wolffy. He is very afraid of cockroaches.

Jonie (暖羊羊; Nuǎn Yángyáng; 'Warm Sheep')

Voiced by: Deng Yuting
She is a docile and kind female goat who is class president of Weslie's class in school. She is revealed in the Olympics special to possess mountain goat genes, effectively making her the strongest goat in Goat Village above Sparky. She is the most sensible goat, but can sometimes be talkative. She is friends with Jay, and best friends with Tibbie. Like Tibbie, Jonie is usually gentle and kind. She tends to scold the boy goats (Weslie, Sparky, and Paddi) but still hangs out and cares for them. She has a small pink heart-shaped satchel that she wears as well as a matching ribbon and red shoes. She has a purple pet owl called 'Nuan-Nuan' (warm-warm).

Stacy (花羊羊; Huā Yángyáng; 'Flower Goat')

Voiced by: Yan Yanzi
She was Slowy's first love when they were young. In one episode, the goats bring Stacy to Goat Village through the time machine Slowy invented. She paints her horns pink and wears pretty pink petaled flowers (with yellow smiley faces in the middle) on them. She wears a purple purse, pink shoes, and a pink choker. She has short ponytails with bells on them. As an adult, she had pretty bangs. Tibbie became slightly jealous of her because she was more beautiful when she was in Goat Village. She is gentle and sweet, with a soft voice and a beautiful tone. She is also mentioned by Slowy in the sixth movie.

Old Mandy (软绵绵; Ruǎnmiánmián; 'Soft Goat')

He is the first village chief of the Goat Village and the ancestor of the Sheep Clan. Slowy, Xiyu Daoyang, etc. are all Ruan Mianmian's apprentices and are the great heroes among the sheep.

Smarc (智羊羊; Zhiyangyang; 'Smart Goat')

The father of Weslie, the husband of Lily, and the adoptive father of Bingbingyang, the greatest scientist in the universe, wearing a magnifying glass in his left eye, an aviation expert of the Sheep Clan, and has developed a variety of fighter jets, bombers, and missiles for the Sheep Clan. He also created the Candy Kingdom. He first appeared in Pleasant Goat and Big Big Wolf: The Year of the Rabbit, and fell into the dragon world due to a malfunction of the space-time accelerator.

Lily (丽羊羊; Lìyángyáng)

Weslie's mother and Smarc's wife. Before joining Smarc on the space mission, she was a well-known singer. She normally wears a sparkling blue dress, and also wears bells (identical to the one that Weslie wears on his neck) as earrings.

=== Wolves ===
Wolffy (Chinese: 灰太狼; pinyin: Huī Tàiláng; lit. 'Grey Wolf')

Voiced by: Zhang Lin
Wolffy is the main antagonist of the series. Like the Goats, his name is a literal pun, as "太狼" or 太郎, Tarō is a common Japanese given name meaning "first son", with "Grey" being his family name. Wolffy is the 250th generation grandson of Wu Dalang, the ancestor of the wolf clan, and the king of the wolves of the Green Green Grassland. He is very smart but conceited, claiming that he is the greatest inventor in the Green Green Grassland. He wears an orange cap with a yellow patch and has a scar under his eye. Wolffy is a middle-aged, hen-pecked husband who lives with his demanding wife, Wolnie, in a castle on the outskirts of Goat Village in Green Green Grassland. Wolffy is usually motivated solely by fear of his wife, and he is constantly under her demand to bring home goats for food. He is a good cook and always makes delicious dishes for his family.
A rather bumbling character, he always concocts elaborate plans and creates fanciful traps to catch the goats, with limited success. He usually ends up being outwitted by the goats, and is often unable to find loopholes in his overly complex plans. His failures to obtain food are met by angry scoldings from his wife and slapstick violence, such as being hit over the head with a frying pan. Even so, his love for Wolnie never wavers. Since he is always unable to catch any goats, his wolf identity (like a nationality, which provides social security and medical benefits) has been revoked many times by the wolf pack.
Wolffy himself lacked any real desire to catch the goats at first, and only did so in an attempt to appease and impress his wife. He will readily abandon his hunt should some other means appear that will likely impress his wife more. His catchphrase (which he utters in one form or another each episode) is "Darn goat! I'll definitely come back/ I'll come back for sure/ I'll be back/ I'll get my revenge!" (mostly "I'll be back" in later seasons, which is based on The Terminator). He always catches frogs or makes salad for meals as he cannot catch any goats. He and Happy (Weslie) become friends in the "Mighty Little Defenders". In China, sometimes he is seen as a respectable cartoon character by older generations because of his faithfulness to his wife and persistence on catching goats despite repeated failure.
In one episode, Wolffy invites his uncle to stay, but he fears losing face in front of him because of Wolnie's violence. He convinces his wife to pretend to be submissive while the uncle was there. However, at the end of the episode when the uncle leaves, Wolnie gives him a good thrashing "to compensate for all the time she missed out on hitting him".

Wolnie (Chinese: 红太狼; pinyin: Hóng Tàiláng; lit. 'Red Wolf')

Voiced by: Zhao Na
The narcissistic wife of Wolffy, who dresses in a red robe with black and white trims. She wears red lipstick, make-up, and two hoops on her feet. She is overly-demanding and abusive towards her husband, hitting him with her frying pan whenever his schemes fail. However, she still genuinely love him and deeply cares for his safety. Additionally, she is shown to be intelligent; while her husband can think of outlandish inventions to catch goats, her simple ideas are the ones that are actually successful.

Howie or Wilie (Chinese: 小灰灰; pinyin: Xiǎo Huīhuī; lit. 'Little Grey')

Voiced by: Liang Ying
He is the son of Wolffy and Wolnie. He is a cute pup with big eyes. He is approximately 2–6 years old in human years. He is a crybaby, but is very innocent. He likes to go out hunting with his father but gets lost most of the time. He plays a large role in the first four movie, The Super Adventure, Desert Trek: The Adventure of the Lost Totem, Moon Castle: The Space Adventure, and Mission Incredible: Adventures on the Dragon's Trail.
He also forms a mostly one-sided friendship with Paddi, and affectionately calls him "Brother Paddi". Their relationship is highlighted in the second and fifth movie. He has an attachment to Paddi, but he also likes the other goats, addressing Weslie as "Brother Weslie", Tibbie as "Sister Tibbie", and so on.
After he is expelled from the wolf school, his father reluctantly enrolls him in the goat school, where he becomes friends with all the other goats, occasionally aiding them in their struggle against Wolffy.

Huang Tailang (Chinese: 黄太狼; pinyin: Huáng Tàiláng; lit. 'Yellow Wolf')

Voiced by: Zhang Lin
Wolffy's grandfather. Like his grandson, he is often abused by his wife (usually via getting things thrown at his head).

Hei Tailang (Chinese: 黑太狼; pinyin: Hēi Tàiláng; lit. 'Black Wolf')

Wolffy's Father. He was the previous villain of Goat Village before the goats found a way to hex him with a cursed invention, resulting in his falling into a burning fire and meeting his end, but in rescue across time, his death was different.

Jay (Chinese: 蕉太狼; pinyin: Jiāo Tàiláng; lit. 'Banana Wolf')

Voiced by: Liu Hongyun
He is a large, mild-mannered wolf who is a vegetarian obsessed with bananas. He befriends Jonie, who likes to provide him with bananas. He was forced to marry Fragrant Wolf, but after he realizes Fragrant was as cruel as Wolnie when they were at the Central Carnival Park, he decided not to and fled from his wedding saying, "I DON'T!!!!!!!!!!!!!!!" (Even Wolffy warned him not to marry Fragrant because he got married the exact same way with his wife as Banana almost married Fragrant.) He is the nephew of Wolffy.

Xiang Tailang (Chinese: 香太狼; pinyin: Xiāng Tàiláng; lit. 'Fragrant Wolf')

Voiced by: Deng Yuting
Xiang Tailang is the cousin of Wolnie. She is a young female wolf with rainbow hoop earrings and a pink dress. She has a crush on Jay, and almost marries him, but ends up marrying Ye Tailang (Wolffy's cousin) at her wedding, who was secretly in love with her. Her name is likely a reference to Xiang Fei, a favored concubine of the Qianlong Emperor. Her weapon tends to be two irons. She is very cruel, much like her cousin Wolnie.

Wu Dalang (Chinese: 武大狼; pinyin: Wǔ Dàláng; lit. 'Martial Wolf')

The ancestor of the wolf clan and the archrival of Old Mandy, the ancestor of the goat clan. In episode 499, it was revealed that he was the one who gave Wolffy his scar during a time traveling shenanigan.

=== Others ===
Crazy Brother or Jolly (Chinese: 潇洒哥; pinyin: Xiāosǎ Gē; lit. 'Cool Bro')

Voiced by: Zu Liqing
Jolly is an egg with a face. He has a carefree and easygoing personality but is not always intelligent. An occult enthusiast and a joker, his catch phrase is "I'll put a curse on you!" while drawing circles into the ground with a stick. (Once, the drawn circle lit up and granted him powers to shoot laser beams out of his hands.) He enjoys teasing Paddi's pet by saying: "you unfinished egg!" Jolly also has many costumes that he changes into in special occasions. He and his brother, Darky, can merge and become an ultimate powerful egg. (When this happens, the resulting combination looks like Jolly but with a red cape and a red underwear on his head.)

Black Commander, Darky or Darton (Chinese: 黑大帅; pinyin: Hēi Dàshuài)

Voiced by: Gao Quansheng
Jolly's, black-egg younger brother. Has lightning powers and was evil for some time and was a team with Wolffy.
Note that both Darten and Jolly are their names from the lost Disney, Britanic English dub from "Great War in the Bizarre World". (Chinese: 古古怪界大作战; pinyin: Gǔ gǔguài jiè dà zuòzhàn; lit. 'Battle in the Wonderland') A story arc consisting of 60 episodes, episodes 281 to 340 out of the 530 of the original donghua.

Big Humphrey (Chinese: 包包大人; pinyin: Bāobāo Dàrén)

Voiced by: Gao Quansheng
An elephant that serves as the mayor and chief of justice of Green Green Grassland, which encompasses the Goat Village and the Wolf Castle as well as all the other places of residence in Green Green Grassland. His character is a parody of Bao Zheng, a Chinese figure revered for his fairness and judicial judgment in court.

Tiger (Chinese: 泰哥; pinyin: Tài Gē; lit. 'Ti Bro')

Voiced by: Gao Quansheng
So far the only tiger in the series, Tiger is strong, well-muscled, and loves to show off his muscles. His Chinese name is a play on the English word Tiger. It also sounds similar to the Chinese rendering of boxer Mike Tyson.

Flat-beak Allen (Chinese: 扁嘴伦; pinyin: Biǎn Zuǐlún; lit. 'Flat-mouth Lun')

A rather narcissistic duck. He is a superstar singer and often holds concerts at the Green-Green Grassland. Wolffy is a great fan of his, in one episode dressing in drag to get his autograph. But this is often contradicted, such as in the episode where Wolffy kidnaps Allen, shaves him and uses his fur to dress up as him and gain access to the goats. His name is parody of Zhou Jielun (Jay Chou).

=== Pets ===
- 喜喜 (Xǐxǐ, "Happy" or "Joy")

Weslie's pet (a small bouncing horse).

- 美美 (Měiměi, "Fuzzy" or "Tibtib")

Tibbie's pet (a tank and dog combined).

- 蛋蛋 (Dàndan, "Egg" or "Eggy")

Paddi's pet (a flat hard-boiled egg who can fit into small openings).

- 打打 (Dǎdǎ, "Hittie")

Sparky's pet (a pair of blue boxing gloves who actually wear "Fit").

- 暖暖 (Nuǎnnuǎn, "Warmy" or "Jojo")

Jonie's pet (a bird who can create a strong wind by flapping her wings).

== Media ==
=== Animated series ===
Season	Title	Episodes	Premiere date	Network(s)	Directed by	Opening theme	Ending theme
1	Pleasant Goat and Big Big Wolf	530	August 3, 2005	Children's Channel, Hangzhou Television → Zhejiang Television (ZJTV)	Leo Huang	"Biekan Wo Zhi Shi Yizhi Yang" by Ivy Koo	"Biekan Wo Zhi Shi Yizhi Yang" by Ivy Koo
2	Pleasant Goat Sports Game	60	October 23, 2008	CCTV-14	Leo Huang	"Biekan Wo Zhi Shi Yizhi Yang" by Ivy Koo	"Biekan Wo Zhi Shi Yizhi Yang" by Ivy Koo
3	Joys of Seasons	100	May 1, 2010	ZJTV	Huang Xiaoxue	"Biekan Wo Zhi Shi Yizhi Yang" by Yang Peiyi	"Dajia Yiqi Xiyangyang" by Bibi Zhou
4	Pleasant Goat Touring the Expo	20	August 1, 2010	BesTV IPTV Platform	Huang Xiaoxue	None	None
5	Smart Dodging	60	July 1, 2011	ZJTV	Tan Shujun	"Qisimiaoxiang Xi Yangyang" by Xiyangyang Tongxing Hechangtuan	"Qisimiaoxiang Xi Yangyang" by Xiyangyang Tongxing Hechangtuan
6	Happy, Happy, Bang! Bang!	100	October 15, 2011	ZJTV	Huang Zhilong	"Gei Kuaile Jiayou" by Xiyangyang Tongsheng Hechangtuan	"Gei Kuaile Jiayou" by Xiyangyang Tongsheng Hechangtuan
7	The Athletic Carousel	60	June 30, 2012	ZJTV	Huang Zhilong	"Kuaile Jingji-chang" by Queena Cui	"Kuaile Jingji-chang" by Queena Cui
8	The Happy Diary	60	December 8, 2012	ZJTV	Huang Zhilong	"Biekan Wo Zhi Shi Yizhi Yang" by Ivy Koo	"Biekan Wo Zhi Shi Yizhi Yang" by Ivy Koo
9	Happy Formula	60	July 26, 2013	CCTV-1	Huang Zhilong	"Biekan Wo Zhi Shi Yizhi Yang" by Ivy Koo	"Biekan Wo Zhi Shi Yizhi Yang" by Ivy Koo
10	Paddi the Amazing Chef	52	December 20, 2013	CCTV-1	Huang Zhilong	"Lan Yangyang Dang Dachu" by Purple Lee	"Lan Yangyang Dang Dachu" by Purple Lee
11	Dear Little Wish	60	July 30, 2014	Aniworld Satellite Television (Aniworld)	CPE Directing Group	"Yangyang Xiao Xinyuan" by Purple Lee	"Yangyang Xiao Xinyuan" by Purple Lee
12	The Tailor's Closet	60	September 4, 2014	Aniworld	CPE Directing Group	"Baibian Xiao Caifeng" by Purple Lee	"Baibian Xiao Caifeng" by Purple Lee
13	Love You Babe	60	February 12, 2015	Aniworld	CPE Directing Group	"Love You Babe" by Purple Lee	"Love You Babe" by Purple Lee
14	Everyday Pleasant Goat	365	July 15, 2015	eSurfing iCartoons	Various	None	None
15	Adventures in the Primitive World	60	August 17, 2015	Aniworld	Chen Jianwei	"Zhiji" by Purple Lee	"Zhiji" by Purple Lee
16	Marching to the New Wonderland	60	January 15, 2016	Aniworld	Pu Zhikang	"Xi-ha Chuang Shijie" by Purple Lee	"Biekan Wo Zhi Shi Yizhi Yang" by Ivy Koo
17	The Little Detective	60	July 9, 2016	CCTV-14	Pu Zhikang	"Yangyang Xiao Zhentan" by Li Jiji and Cou Shi	"Biekan Wo Zhi Shi Yizhi Yang" by Ivy Koo
18	Pleasant Goat Fun Class: Animals & Plants	26	July 13, 2016	Youku, Tencent Video, iQiyi, Le.com, Mango TV	Hu Dan	"Zhiqu Yang Xuetang" by Purple Lee	"Biekan Wo Zhi Shi Yizhi Yang" by Ivy Koo
19	Pleasant Goat Fun Class: Sports are Fun	26	August 23, 2016	Youku, Tencent Video, iQiyi	Hu Dan	"Zhiqu Yang Xuetang" by Purple Lee	"Biekan Wo Zhi Shi Yizhi Yang" by Ivy Koo
20	Man Jing Tou	60	November 24, 2016	Youku, Tencent Video, iQiyi	Chen Jianwei	"Biekan Wo Zhi Shi Yizhi Yang" by Ivy Koo	"Biekan Wo Zhi Shi Yizhi Yang" by Ivy Koo
21	Adventures in the Sea （Marching to the New Wonderland 2）	60	January 9, 2017	Aniworld	Pu Zhikang, Xu Chang	"Lanse Manyou" by Hua Xue	"Biekan Wo Zhi Shi Yizhi Yang" by Ivy Koo
22	Mr.Wolffy, Mr.Right!	24	February 14, 2017	Youku, Tencent Video, iQiyi	Liao Jincong	"Jia Ren Jiu Jia Hui Tailang"; Purple Lee	"Jia Ren Jiu Jia Hui Tailang"; Purple Lee
23	War of Invention	60	July 12, 2017	Aniworld	Xu Chang	"Faming Da Zuozhan" by Huang Jing	"Biekan Wo Zhi Shi Yizhi Yang" by Ivy Koo
24	Pleasant Goat Fun Class: The Earth Carnival	26	July 19, 2017	Youku	Hu Dan	"Zhiqu Yang Xuetang" by Purple Lee	"Biekan Wo Zhi Shi Yizhi Yang" by Ivy Koo
25	Pleasant Goat Fun Class: Travel Around the World	26	December 1, 2017	Youku	Hu Dan	"Zhiqu Yang Xuetang" by Purple Lee	"Biekan Wo Zhi Shi Yizhi Yang" by Ivy Koo
26	Flying Island: The Sky Adventure （Marching to the New Wonderland 3）	60	January 27, 2018	Aniworld	Pu Zhikang, Chen Huiyan, Cai Yuying	"Xi-ha Chuang Yunduan" by Cou Shi	"Xi-ha Chuang Shijie" by Purple Lee
27	Pleasant Goat Fun Class: Idiom World	26	February 15, 2018	Youku	Hu Dan	"Zhiqu Yang Xuetang" by Purple Lee	"Biekan Wo Zhi Shi Yizhi Yang" by Ivy Koo
28	Pleasant Goat Fun Class: Finding Treasures	26	February 22, 2018	Youku	Hu Dan	"Zhiqu Yang Xuetang" by Purple Lee	"Biekan Wo Zhi Shi Yizhi Yang" by Ivy Koo
29	Mighty Little Defenders （War of Invention 2）	60	January 18, 2019	Aniworld	Huang Xiaoxue	"Yonggan Xiangqian" by Xie Lin	"Biekan Wo Zhi Shi Yizhi Yang" by Ivy Koo
30	Rescue Across Time （Marching to the New Wonderland 4）	60	July 12, 2019	Aniworld, Youku, Tudou, iQiyi, Tencent Video, Mango TV	Chen Huiyan, Huang Junming	"Shengli de Zhongdian" by Liufu Xinhong	"Xi-ha Chuang Shijie" by Purple Lee
31	The Intriguing Alien Guests （Mighty Little Defenders 2）	60	January 10, 2020	Aniworld, iQiyi, Youku, Tencent Video, Ixigua, Mango TV	Huang Junming	"Shouhu Zhiguang" by Wei Zunguang and Xie Lin	"Biekan Wo Zhi Shi Yizhi Yang" by Ivy Koo
32	Against the Dark Force （Mighty Little Defenders 3）	60	July 17, 2020	Aniworld, iQiyi, Youku, Tencent Video, Ixigua, Mango TV	Huang Junming, Hu Dan	"Jiuzai Shengbian" by Peng Zhenxian	"Biekan Wo Zhi Shi Yizhi Yang" by Ivy Koo
33	Mighty Goat Squad	26	August 1, 2020	Aniworld, iQiyi, Youku, Tencent Video, Mango TV	Liang Jiaqi	"Yangyang Xingdong Dui" by Chen Haodong	"Yangyang Xingdong Dui" (Instrumental)
34	Dunk for Victories (The Legends of the Sports Heroes)	60	January 22, 2021	Aniworld, iQiyi, Youku, Tencent Video, Mango TV	Huang Junming, Chen Lijin	"Xiwang Zhi Lan" by Yi Qi	"Biekan Wo Zhi Shi Yizhi Yang" by Ivy Koo
35	Ultimate Battle: The Next Generation (Mighty Little Defenders 4)	60	July 9, 2021	Aniworld, Youku, Mango TV	Liang Jiaqi, Chen Lijin, Huang Junming	"Chuangzao Weilai" by Xie Lin	"Biekan Wo Zhi Shi Yizhi Yang" by Ivy Koo
36	Mighty Goat Squad 2	26	November 26, 2021	Aniworld, Youku, iQiyi, Mango TV, Tencent Video	Hu Dan	"Yangyang Xingdong Dui" by Chen Haodong	"Yangyang Xingdong Dui" (Instrumental)
37	The Great Rescue (Mighty Little Defenders 5, Against the Dark Force 2)	60	July 15, 2022	Aniworld, Youku, iQiyi, Mango TV, Tencent Video	Liang Jiaqi, Chen Huiyan	"Yueding" by Xie Lin	"Biekan Wo Zhi Shi Yizhi Yang" by Ivy Koo
38	The Season Towns (Mighty Little Defenders 6)	60	January 6, 2023	Aniworld, Youku, Mango TV	Chen Huiyan, He Yingqiang	"Yongzhe Zhi Lu" by Cai Wenhao	"Biekan Wo Zhi Shi Yizhi Yang" by Ivy Koo
39	Mystery Ocean Adventure (Mighty Little Defenders 7)	60	July 6, 2023	Aniworld, Youku, iQiyi, Mango TV, Tencent Video	Hu Dan, Rong Yuqing	"Hangxiang Weilai" by Li Wentian and Mo Haitong,	"Biekan Wo Zhi Shi Yizhi Yang" by Ivy Koo
40	Explore Wolffy's Mind (Mighty Little Defenders 8)	60	January 19, 2024	Aniworld, Youku, iQiyi, Tencent Video	Cai Yuying, He Yingqiang	"Xin de Lücheng" by Mo Lifei and Luo Zhiheng	"Biekan Wo Zhi Shi Yizhi Yang" by Ivy Koo
41	Crazy Hubs (Mighty Little Defenders 9)	60	July 5, 2024	Aniworld, Youku, iQiyi, Tencent Video	Hu Dan, Zhou Zeju	"Zao Meng Qi Leyuan" by Ren Ke	"Biekan Wo Zhi Shi Yizhi Yang" by Ivy Koo
42	Martial World Rescue (Mighty Little Defenders 10)	60	January 10, 2025	Aniworld, Youku, iQiyi, Tencent Video	Chen Lijin, Liang Songxian	"Shaonian You" by Gao Jinpeng	"Biekan Wo Zhi Shi Yizhi Yang" by Ivy Koo
43	New Wild Cosmos (Mighty Little Defenders 11)	60	July 4, 2025	Aniworld, Youku, iQiyi, Tencent Video	Hu Dan, Zhou Zeju	"Wo de Muyang" by Li Yue	"Biekan Wo Zhi Shi Yizhi Yang" by Ivy Koo
44	Bizarre World: Echoes of the Unknown (Mighty Little Defenders 12)	63	January 23, 2026	Aniworld, Youku, iQiyi, Tencent Video			
45	Pojie Shanhaijue (Mighty Little Defenders 13)	63	July 10, 2026	Aniworld, Youku, iQiyi, Tencent Video			

=== Films ===
The series was made into nine animated films and two live-action animated films.

No.	Title	Release date (China)	Box office (Mainland China)	Director	Theme songs
Animated films
1	The Super Adventure	January 16, 2009 (Mainland); August 27, 2009 (Hong Kong); August 27, 2009 (Macau)	82.8 million yuan	Sung Pang Choo	"Biekan Wo Zhi Shi Yizhi Yang" by Ivy Koo "Happy Niu Year Ni Zui Niu" by Ah Niu "Yongbao Chuntian" by J.O.Y.
2	Desert Trek: The Adventure of the Lost Totem	January 29, 2010 (Mainland); February 13, 2010 (Hong Kong); July 23, 2010 (Taiwan); December 24, 2010 (Macau)	124.38 million yuan	Sung Pang Choo	"Dajia Yiqi Xiyangyang" by Bibi Zhou "Zuoshou Youshou" by Yang Peiyi "Wo Ai Pingdiguo" by Ronald Cheng
3	Moon Castle: The Space Adventure	January 21, 2011 (Mainland); April 1, 2011 (Taiwan); April 21, 2011 (Hong Kong and Macau)	139.25 million yuan	Frankie Chung	"Yangyang Dingguagua" by Guo Yi (in Mandarin) or Purple Lee (in Cantonese) "Xingguang Xia de Mengxiang" by Guo Yi (in Mandarin) or Purple Lee (in Cantonese) "Chai Chai Chai" by Lai Weifeng "Hong Tailang Kuangxiangqu" by Cui Yan "Wudi Pingdiguo" by Cui Yan
4	Mission Incredible: Adventures on the Dragon's Trail	January 12, 2012 (Mainland); January 20, 2012 (Taiwan); April 5, 2012 (Hong Kong); April 5, 2012 (Macau); July 16, 2020 (South Korea)	167.619 million yuan	William Kan	"Women You Wugong" by Ou Di (in Mandarin) or "Xinzhong de Taiyang" by Lai Weifeng (in Cantonese) "Feiteng de Xin" by Purple Lee "Xiaoshihou" by Cui Yan (in Mandarin) or "Gan'en" by Li Silin (in Cantonese)
5	The Mythical Ark: Adventures in Love & Happiness	January 24, 2013 (Mainland); February 9, 2013 (Hong Kong); February 9, 2013 (Macau); July 30, 2020 (South Korea)	124.937 million yuan	William Kan	"Kaixin de Zhandou" by Kate Tsui (in Mandarin) or "Zhandou Haojiao" by Lai Weifeng (in Cantonese) "Wo Yao Gaofei" by Purple Lee "Baowei Diqiu" by Tiger Hu (in Mandarin) or "Detianduhou" by Don Li (in Cantonese) "Shange Duichang" by Zu Qing and Zhang Lin (in Mandarin) or Zeng Peiyi and Luo Weijie (in Cantonese)
6	Meet the Pegasus	January 16, 2014 (Mainland); January 30, 2014 (Hong Kong); January 30, 2014 (Macau)	86.24 million yuan	William Kan	"He Mengxiang Feixiang" (in Mandarin) or "Gongchuang Chuanqi" (in Cantonese) by Lai Weifeng "Fengzhong de Xiangyu" by Purple Lee "Yongyou Weilai" by Queena Cui (in Mandarin) or "Zhiyin Banni Xing" by Kandy Wong
7	Amazing Pleasant Goat	January 31, 2015 (Mainland); February 19, 2015 (Hong Kong); February 19, 2015 (Macau); February 27, 2019 (South Korea)	67.815 million yuan	Leo Huang	"Zhiji" by Purple Lee "Langzu Jueqi" (in Mandarin) or "Langzu Xin Shijie" (in Cantonese) by Steven Ma "Shanliang de Liliang" by Lai Weifeng "Zhiyao You Mengxiang" by Queena Cui
8	Dunk for Future	February 1, 2022 (Mainland); September 24, 2022 (Japan); February 12, 2022 (Canada)	160.331 million yuan	Leo Huang	"Biekan Wo Zhi Shi Yizhi Yang 2022" by Bibi Zhou "Jiushi Guanjun" by Luo Weiluo "Nifeng Shengzhang" by Lu Shilang "Guan Lan Qingchun" by Lu Shilang
9	The World Guardians	July 19, 2024 (Mainland)	91.2367 million yuan	Huang Junming, Chen Lijin	"Tansuo Yuezhang" by Xu Xinsi "Zuihou Yi Ji" by Mo Haitong "Yueding" by Mo Haitong
10	Bright New Dawn	July 26, 2025 (Mainland)		Chen Huiyan, Liang Jiaqi	"Zai Ni Shenpang" by Mo Haitong
11	Dunk for Future 2	2027		Huang Weiming, Huang Junming	
Live-action animated films
1	I Love Wolffy	August 10, 2012 (Mainland); April 4, 2013 (Hong Kong)	75.35 million yuan	Zhu Feng	"Wo Ai Ni, Hui Tailang" by Gui Yue
2	I Love Wolffy 2	August 1, 2013 (Mainland)	75.49 million yuan	Ye Kai	"Wo Yiding Hui Huilai de" by Zhao Yingjun

=== Stage shows ===
- Pleasant Goat and Big Big Wolf: Memory Thief, 2009
- Pleasant Goat and Big Big Wolf: Three Wishes, 2010
- Pleasant Goat and Big Big Wolf: Wilie's Wish, 2012
- Pleasant Goat and Big Big Wolf: A Wonderful Musical Journey, 2013
- Pleasant Goat and Big Big Wolf: Dance Your Dream, 2016

== Broadcast ==
It is aired on over 75 local cable and satellite TV stations in Mainland China and overseas, including Zhejiang Television, CCTV and Aniworld Satellite Television, Hong Kong's TVB and Taiwan's Momo Kids. The show was also aired in India, South Korea, Malaysia, Singapore, Vietnam, Indonesia, Cambodia and North America, according to investment banker Francis Leung, quoted in the Wall Street Journal. As of 2011, an English dub has been aired in Taiwan.

In 2010, Disney gained the license to broadcast the show on their Disney channels. Alpha terminated the contract with Disney before the expiration date in September 2016 at the expense of US$2 million, and Pleasant Goat and Big Big Wolf has had nothing to do with Disney since then.

A few episodes of Pleasant Goat and Big Big Wolf had formerly aired in India on Hungama TV, dubbed in Hindi as Kya Bakra Hai ("What a Goat"). In Africa, the series airs on StarTimes Kids. The show had aired in the Arab world on Jordan TV, Basma, and Shehab TV, dubbed in Arabic as Sheep Village (قرية الخراف).

== Awards ==
- 2024, March 15: Explore Wolffy's Mind: NRTA 2023Q4 Excellent Chinese Television Animation
- 2020, October 26: Mighty Goat Squad: NRTA 2020Q2 Excellent Chinese Television Animation
- 2020, March 11: The Intriguing Alien Guests: NRTA 2019Q4 Excellent Chinese Television Animation

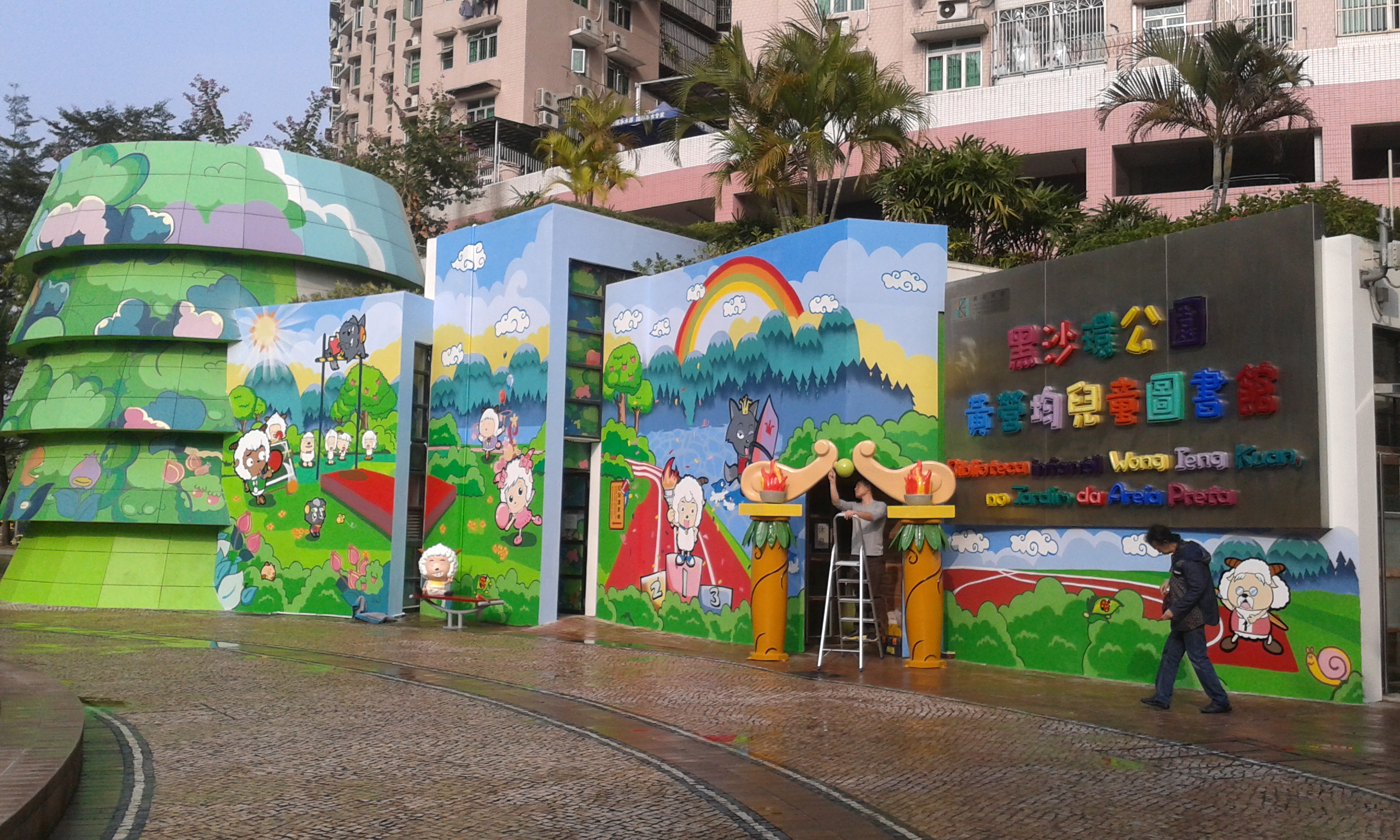
Wong Ieng Kuan Children's Library in Areia Preta Urban Park (Biblioteca Infantil Wong Ieng Kuan no Jardim da Areia Preta; 黑沙環公園黃營均兒童圖書館) in Nossa Senhora de Fátima, Macau has a Pleasant Goat and Big Big Wolf theme

- 2019, August 21: Pleasant Goat and Big Big Wolf: The Annual Top Ten Animation intellectual Property of Commercial Value
- 2018, July 4: Pleasant Goat Fun Class: Finding Treasures: NRTA 2018Q1 Excellent Chinese Television Animation
- 2018, April 19: Pleasant Goat Fun Class: NRTA 2017 Excellent Chinese Television Animation
- 2017, August 16: Pleasant Goat and Big Big Wolf: The Annual Top Ten Animation intellectual Property of Commercial Value
- 2017, April 15: Pleasant Goat and Big Big Wolf — Amazing Pleasant Goat: Outstanding Script Award for 2015–2016 Chinese Animated Films
- 2016: Pleasant Goat and Big Big Wolf: Best Animated TV Series of CCG EXPO
- 2013, April 24: Pleasant Goat and Big Big Wolf: Mission Incredible: Adventures on the Dragon's Trail: Animated Film Golden Cup in the 9th "Golden Monkey King" Award Competition 2013.
- 2013, October: Pleasant Goat and Big Big Wolf: Joys of Seasons: "Five-One Project" Award
- 2011: Pleasant Goat and Big Big Wolf: The Best Animation Brand Award of Chinese Culture and Art
- 2010: Pleasant Goat and Big Big Wolf: Golden Award (Animation) of WIPO Copyright
- 2010: Pleasant Goat and Big Big Wolf: The Best Chinese Animation, 16th Magnolia Award
- 2009: Pleasant Goat and Big Big Wolf: The Super Adventure: The 13th Huabiao Excellent Animation Award
- 2008, July 5: Pleasant Goat and Big Big Wolf: Recipient of Guangdong channels' "The 2007 Grand Prize for Outstanding Domestically Produced Animated Cartoon"
- 2008, June 13: Pleasant Goat and Big Big Wolf: Recipient of "14th Shanghai TV Festival Magnolia Award" – "Animation Silver Award"
- 2008, Jan 19: Pleasant Goat and Big Big Wolf: Recipient of "The 4th Annual JinLong Prize for Original Cartoon Animation 2007" – "Mainland China, Hong-Kong, Macau and Taiwan The Best Creative Animation of the Year Award"
- 2007, Nov 5: Pleasant Goat and Big Big Wolf: Recipient of "The 2005 National Children's Programming Excellence in Merchandises and Animation Awards" – "Grand Prize for Outstanding Domestically Produced Animated Cartoon"
- 2007, June 15: Cartoon Express The Hong Kong Recipient of "The 2007 National Consumer's Most Popular Brand Grand Prize"
- Pleasant Goat and Big Big Wolf Guangdong Privately Operated Film and Television Enterprise Award, "Outstanding Television Animated Cartoon Program Award" for 2001–2005
- 2005 Outstanding China Animation Award – "Pleasant Goat and Big Big Wolf (1–40 episodes)
- Pleasant Goat and Big Big Wolf The show's leading character, "Pleasant Goat" was honored with Southern Children's Channel's "2005 the Most Popular Cartoon Award" and "The Annual Character Image Grand Prize"
- 2006, December 11: Pleasant Goat and Big Big Wolf: Recipient of "China academy Awards" – "Technique in Animation Award"
- 2006, December 11: Pleasant Goat and Big Big Wolf: Recipient of "China academy Awards" – "The Outstanding Works in Animation Award"
- Certificate of "National Animation Industry Base": by Issued Guangdong Administration of Radio, Film and TV, 2006
- 2006, June: Pleasant Goat and Big Big Wolf: Recipient of "The 23rd Chinese Television Golden Eagle Awards" – "Nomination for Image Arts Design Award"
- 2006, April 24: The Guangdong Province Bureau for Broadcast Award for Creativity for Television Movie, The Professional Association 2001–2005, consists of Guangdong privately operated film and television enterprises awarded "The Animated Television Cartoon Production Award" for Guangdong Province film and television programs 2001–2005

== See also ==
- Black Cat Detective
- Boonie Bears, a children's 3D animated series in China
- zh:连云港烤羊事件 - "sheep-roasting" incident of "sheep-roasting" in Lianyungang involving arson
