= Meet the Pegasus =

- Chinese: 喜羊羊与灰太狼之飞马奇遇记
- Directed by: William Kan; Huang Xiaoxue; Yu Tak Wai
- Written by: Wang Shu; Wu Chaowei; Shi Jianna; Wu Ying
- Based on: Pleasant Goat and Big Big Wolf by Huang Weiming
- Produced by: Xu Hao; Cai Xiaodong; Wang Zhonglei; Yu Jie; Li Lisi; Yang Tingkai; Helen Li
- Edited by: Chen Shengrui
- Music by: Tomy Wai
- Production companies: Toonmax Media; Creative Power Entertaining; Huayi Brothers Media Group; Guangdong Alpha Animation and Culture
- Distributed by: Huayi Brothers Media Group (China); Toonmax Media; Creative Power Entertaining; Intercontinental Film Distributors (H.K.) (Hong Kong)
- Release dates: 16 January 2014 (China); 30 January 2014 (Hong Kong)
- Running time: 83 minutes
- Country: China
- Languages: Mandarin; Cantonese
- Budget: CN¥29 million
- Box office: CN¥86.2 million (Mainland China); HK$1.23 million (Hong Kong)

Meet the Pegasus (simplified Chinese: 喜羊羊与灰太狼之飞马奇遇记; traditional Chinese: 喜羊羊與灰太狼之飛馬奇遇記; pinyin: Xǐ Yáng Yáng Yǔ Huī Tài Láng Zhī Fēi Mǎ Qí Yù Jì) is a 2014 Chinese animated comedy adventure family film part of the film series based on the animated television series Pleasant Goat and Big Big Wolf. It is preceded by The Mythical Ark: Adventures in Love & Happiness (2013) and is followed by Pleasant Goat and Big Big Wolf – Amazing Pleasant Goat (2015).

== Plot ==
The Pegasus prince's wings are accidentally hit by Wolffy and thus he falls to Green-Green Grassland, which cause changes to the fairy tale in Pegasus city. The goats decide to help Pegasus prince get back to his city and surely Wolffy chases the goats all the way to Pegasus city. They go through rainbow rain, polar light sea and even to the hanging garden together with the prince, but Weslie saves the prince got ends up by crashed, everyone is sad, but both of while saves by the plane, They even help to solve the crisis caused by Wolffy in Pegasus city and bring a happy ending there.

== Voice cast ==
- Zu Liqing - Weslie
- Deng Yuting - Tibbie / Jonie
- Liang Ying - Paddi / Wilie
- Liu Hongyun - Sparky
- Gao Quansheng - Slowy
- Zhang Lin - Wolffy
- Zhao Na - Wolnie
- Ryan Zheng - Prince Pegasus
- Bai Baihe - Princess Blue

== Reception ==
The film grossed RMB47.4 million (US$7.83 million) at the Chinese box office four days after being released. The film grossed a total of CN¥86.243 million in China.
