= Infinity Nado =

- Genre: 3D animation Beyblade topic
- Created by: Cài Dōng Qīng (蔡东青)
- Written by: Cài Dōng Qīng
- Directed by: Season 1: Hán Zhú (寒竹); Qiū Fēng (丘峰); Season 2: Qiū Fēng (丘峰); Xióng Kě (熊可); Tǔ Yáo (土垚); Season 3: Hán Zhú (寒竹)
- Voices of: Lǐ Xù Qiáo (李旭乔); Liú Hóng Yùn (刘红韵); Shēn Kè (申克); Liú Xiǎo Tiān (刘晓天); Guō Yà Wéi (郭亚维); Bái Wén Xiǎn (白文显); Zhōu Yán (周岩); Guō Ruì (郭瑞); Shí Lěi (石磊); Sòng Lěi (宋磊); Zhāng Lì Méng (张力萌); Liú Zhèn Yàn (刘振艳)
- Country of origin: China
- Original language: Chinese
- No. of seasons: 7

Production
- Executive producer: Fāng Yào Qiáng (方耀强)
- Producers: Chén Wěi Jūn (陈伟军); Lǐ Zhōng (李中); Luó Zhōu (罗周); Xiàng Guāng Huī (向光辉); Fàn Yǒu Huá (范友华); Gài Fēi (盖飞)
- Running time: Season 1,2,3 & 5: ~22 minutes (each episode); Season 6: ~11 minutes (each episode); Season 7: ~13 minutes (each episode)

Original release
- Release: 2012

King of Warrior: Infinity Nado (Chinese: 战斗王之飓风战魂; pinyin: Zhàn Dòu Wáng zhī Jù Fēng Zhàn Hún, lit. 'Battle King: Hurricane Fighting Spirit'), or simply Infinity Nado (Chinese: 飓风战魂; pinyin: Jù Fēng Zhàn Hún, lit. 'Hurricane Fighting Spirit'), is a Chinese animated television series produced by Cài Dōng Qīng (Chinese: 蔡东青) and co-produced by Alpha Group Co.. It premiered on August 23, 2012.

Up to present, the series has a total of six seasons, including three original seasons: Infinity Nado season 1 (Chinese: 战斗王之飓风战魂), Infinity Nado season 2 (Chinese: 战斗王之飓风战魂2) and Infinity Nado season 3 (Chinese: 战斗王之飓风战魂3); and three rebooted seasons: Infinity Nado season 5 (Chinese: 战斗王之飓风战魂5), Infinity Nado season 6 (Chinese: 飓风战魂之剑旋陀螺; pinyin: Jù fēng zhàn hún zhī jiàn xuán tuó luó) and Infinity Nado season 7 (Chinese: 飓风战魂之旋力启源; pinyin: Jù fēng zhàn hún zhī xuán lì qǐ yuán. (Note: There is no Infinity Nado season 4 because the Chinese holds a belief that the Chinese word for "four" (四, pinyin: sì, jyutping: sei^{3}) sounds quite similar to the word for "death" (死, pinyin: sǐ, jyutping: sei^{2}) in many varieties of Chinese.)

The series has been translated into many different languages such as Russian, Vietnamese, Arabic and English when released in other countries.

== Plot ==
In Infinity Nado season 1–3, the story takes place in a post-apocalyptic world. 13 years prior to the start of the series, Hurricane Tower descended down from space and decimated human society, leaving its surrounding area a deserted wasteland. A spinning top culture developed after this, with the War God Nado Dashing Fists serving as inspiration for the Battle Nados used by many human characters.

The story follows Jin, Dawn, Davis and Cecilia and their adventures to save the world from destruction. They travel to places such as Hurricane Tower, various ancient ruins around the world and even inter-dimensional space.

The Infinity Nado series features a spinning top (called Battle Nado in the series) combat system comprising four types: Attack (攻击型), Defense (防御型), Endurance (持久型), and Balance (平衡型), with the Balance type capable of changing attributes by switching the spinning head.

== Protagonists ==
=== Jin ===
Original name: Yè Fēng (Chinese: 叶枫)
Age: 13 (season 1), 15 (season 2), 16 (season 3)
Voice actor: Lǐ Xù Qiáo (李旭乔)

A young man who was saved by Justice War God as an infant and inherited his War God power. Jin is a kind and cheerful person, but sometimes clumsy. He believes that he could make more friends after every battle in Nado Tournaments and he always tries to play fair. His catchphrase is season 1 is "After we battle this round we'll become friends".

=== Dawn ===
Original name: Rèn Yán (Chinese: 任炎)
Age: 13 (season 1), 15 (season 2), 16 (season 3)
Voice actor:

Season 1-2: Liú Hóng Yùn (刘红韵)
Season 3: Liú Xiǎo Cuì (刘晓翠)

Dawn is Jin's second friend in his journey. He is often bigheaded, blunt, and sarcastic making him the comic relief among the group. He has a greedy and cunning side because of being the breadwinner of the family, but he still has a caring side and he is loyal to his friends. Dawn admires Jin for his talent, yet, he has to sometimes "take care" of Jin and somewhat similar to this clumsy friend's babystitter.

=== Davis ===
Original name: Tiān Lěi (Chinese: 天磊)
Age: 16 (season 1), 18 (season 2), 19 (season 3)
Voice actor: Shēn Kè (申克)

Davis is a personnel of the Arthur corporation and a companion of Cecilia. He is the oldest member in the group. He is quiet, loyal, protective, and cautious. Although kind and supportive of his friends, one of Davis' biggest flaws is his vengefulness, judging by his desire for revenge against the War Gods to avenge his father and homeland. Furthermore, Davis is very suspicious and conservative, as well as quite stubborn. Davis is the only character with a male voice actor among the protagonists.

=== Cecilia ===
Original name: Lán Ruò Bīng (Chinese: 蓝若冰)
Age: 13 (season 1), 15 (season 2), 16 (season 3)
Voice actor: Liú Hóng Yùn (刘红韵); Lǐ Xù Qiáo (李旭乔) (as High Priestess War God)

Cecilia is the only female member in the group. She is the adopted daughter of Arthur and one of the figurehead of Arthur's Corporation. Despite having high reputation, status and prominent background, she is quite friendly and amicable. She is quite sharp-witted, and has a selfless personality similar to Jin's. Cecilia is quite famous and well-liked by the people in Freewheel Town (风轮镇) due to of her openness, modesty, and simplicity, coupled with her lovely, beautiful appearance. She is also honored as the "best persistent must-player in the world". Her real identity is High Priestess War God (女教皇战神), daughter of World War God.

=== Pandora ===
Original name: Pān Duō Lā (Chinese: 潘多拉)
Age: physical appearance 14; real age over 1 million (season 2); over 4.5 billion years old (before reviving the Earth, season 3)
Voice actor: Guō Yà Wéi (郭亚维)

Unlike the 4 aforementioned characters, Pandora only starts appearancing in Season 2. He is friends with Jin, Dawn, Davis, and Cecilia. He is created millennials ago by the spiritual power of the Earth. He is a cheerful, innocent, and energetic person, but becomes more serious after regaining his memory. He could be considered the main antagonist in Season 2.

== Theme songs ==
=== Season 1 ===
- Stormrise (Chinese: 风起云涌; pinyin: Fēng Qǐ Yún Yǒng), literal translation: Wind rises and Clouds surge (Note: The official English name is taken from the credits at the end of each episode, available on Infinity Nado's official YouTube channel) (Note: The instrumental version of the song Stormrise is also used as the ending song in Infinity Nado season 1, and it is later used throughout Infinity Nado season 2 and season 3 as a battle theme.)

Composer: Huáng Wén Guǎng (Chinese: 黄文广)
Singer: Xióng Sī Jiā (Chinese: 熊思嘉) (Note: On various official sources, such as the official YouTube channel of Lookus - Alpha Animation 酷看-奥飞动漫, the credits are fully translated into English. However, despite the audio being identical to the original Chinese version and Huáng Wén Guǎng is still credited for Stormrise's music and lyrics, the singer is listed as Yu Tian Long instead of Xióng Sī Jiā (熊思嘉))

=== Season 2 ===
- King of Warrior (Chinese: 战斗王; pinyin: Zhàn Dòu Wáng), literal translation: Battle King (Note: Infinity Nado's season 2 theme song Infinity Nado is in fact using the same instrumentals as Season 1's theme song Stormrise.)

Music: Huáng Wén Guǎng (Chinese: 黄文广)
Lyrics: Sān Běn Mù (Chinese: 三本目)
Singer: Xiè Yǒng Xī (Chinese: 谢永熙)

- Dream Paradise (Chinese: 梦天堂; pinyin: Mèng Tiān Táng)

Music: Huáng Wén Guǎng (Chinese: 黄文广)
Lyrics: Sān Běn Mù (Chinese: 三本目)
Singer: Chén Zhuó (Chinese: 陈卓)

=== Season 3 ===
- Infinity Nado (Chinese: 战斗王; pinyin: Zhàn Dòu Wáng), literal translation: Battle King (Note: Infinity Nado season 2 and Infinity Nado season 3's opening songs are both titled "Zhàn Dòu Wáng" (战斗王) in the original Chinese version, they are written by the same songwriters and performed by the same singer, however, they are two completely different songs.)

Music: Huáng Wén Guǎng (Chinese: 黄文广)
Lyrics: Sān Běn Mù (Chinese: 三本目)
Singer: Xiè Yǒng Xī (Chinese: 谢永熙)

- Heaven Dream (Chinese: 梦天堂; pinyin: Mèng Tiān Táng) (Note: The ending song of Infinity Nado Season 3 is in fact the same as the ending song Dream Paradise in Season 2.)

Music: Huáng Wén Guǎng (Chinese: 黄文广)
Lyrics: Sān Běn Mù (Chinese: 三本目)
Singer: Chén Zhuó (Chinese: 陈卓)

=== Season 5 ===
- Against All Odds (Chinese: 迎难而上; pinyin: Yíng Nán Ér Shàng), literal translation: Rise to the challenge

Music: Lí Yǔn Wén (Chinese: 黎允文)
Lyrics: Huáng Wén Guǎng (Chinese: 黄文广)
Singer: Luó Zhì Héng (Chinese: 罗智恒)

=== Season 6 ===
- Kings of the Future (Chinese: 未来之王; pinyin: Wèi lái zhī wáng)

Music and arrangement: Hēi Hè Butitsolve (Chinese: 黑鹤Butitsolve)
Lyrics: Liáng Shū Chūn (Chinese: 梁抒春)
Singer: Liè Tiān (Chinese: 裂天)

- Paradise of Dreams (Chinese: 梦天堂; pinyin: Mèng Tiān Táng) (Note: The ending song of Infinity Nado Season 6 is in fact the same as the ending song Heaven Dream in Season 2 and 3, using different parts of the song and renaming the English translation name.)

Music: Huáng Wén Guǎng (Chinese: 黄文广)
Lyrics: Sān Běn Mù (Chinese: 三本目)
Singer: Chén Zhuó (Chinese: 陈卓)

== Critical reception ==
On IMDb, Infinity Nado received a score of 7.9, and the series received a score of 8.9 on Douban.
