= Alpha Group Co. =

Chinese animation and toy company

Alpha Group Co., Ltd.
- Native name: 奥飞娱乐股份有限公司
- Formerly: Auldey Toys Co. Ltd. (Chinese: 奥迪玩具实业有限公司), Alpha Animation Co., Ltd. (Chinese: 广东奥飞动漫文化股份有限公司)
- Type: Public
- Traded as: SZSE: 002292
- Industry: Conglomerate
- Founded: December 1993; 32 years ago
- Founder: Cai Dongqing
- Headquarters: Alpha Industrial Park, Middle Section of Wenguan Road, Chenghai District, Shantou, Guangdong Province, China
- Key people: Cai Dongqing (Chairman and General Manager), Li Bin (Secretary), Sun Liang (Financial Controller), He Dehua (Chief Executive Officer)
- Products: Comic book, mass media, entertainment, animation and toy production
- Owner: China Media Capital
- Subsidiaries: Creative Power Entertaining Co., Ltd. Auldey Toys (China); David Toys and Entertainment Inc. (South Korea); Alpha Pictures (Shanghai) Co., Ltd. Alpha Pictures (Hong Kong) Co., Ltd. Alpha Pictures (Beijing) Co., Ltd. Beijing Dazzlings Star Culture Entertainment Company Ltd. Alpha Group Company (Hong Kong)
- Website: gdalpha.com

Alpha Group Co., Ltd. (simplified Chinese: 奥飞娱乐股份有限公司; traditional Chinese: 奧飛娛樂股份有限公司; pinyin: Aòfēi Yúlè Gǔfèng Yǒuxiàngōngsī, in short 奥飞娱乐/ 奧飛娛樂/ Aòfēi Yúlè,) is a Chinese multinational conglomerate with animation, toy, mass media asset and entertainment company headquartered created by Cai Dongqing in 1993. In 2016, it changed its name from Alpha Animation (simplified Chinese: 广东奥飞动漫文化股份有限公司; traditional Chinese: 廣東奧飛動漫文化股份有限公司; pinyin: Guǎngdōng Aòfēi Dòngmàn Wénhuà Gǔfèng Yǒuxiàn gōngsī, in short 奥飞动漫/ 奧飛動漫/ Aòfēi Dòngmàn, English: Guangdong Alpha Animation and Culture Company). The company has a Chinese webcomics site, U17, and also an American film company, Alpha Pictures, and has announced the creation of an animation division also based in the United States.

== History ==
=== Auldey Toys ===
In 1993, Cai Dongqing spent 800,000 RMB to establish Auldey Toys company in Chenghai County, Shantou City, Guangdong Province, China. But the company couldn't develop, so in order to solve this trouble Cai established "Guangzhou Alpha Culture Spread Company".

=== Alpha Animation ===
In 2006, Alpha Animation used ads to sell "yo-yo" ball, and Blazing Teens (Chinese: 火力少年王). In 2007, Alpha was transformed to establish "Guangdong Alpha Animation and Culture Company".

In 2012, Alpha Animation partnered with Hasbro to co-develop brands for China and other global markets. One of the brands selected was Alpha's Blazing Teens series, alongside an unnamed Hasbro property. The first results from this collaboration include Blazing Team and a Kre-O line of toys based on Alpha's Armor Hero franchise, both of which launched in late 2015.

== Subsidiaries ==
=== Creative Power Entertaining ===
Creative Power Entertaining Co., Ltd. (CPE) (Simplified Chinese: 广东原创动力文化传播有限公司, Traditional: 廣東原創動力文化傳播有限公司, Pinyin: Guǎngdōng Yuánchuàng Dònglì Wénhuà Chuánbō Yǒuxiàngōngsī, in short 原创动力/ 原創動力/ Yuánchuàng Dònglì) is a Chinese animation company, established in 2004. It was purchased by Alpha Animation in October 2013.

=== Mingxin Chuangyi Cartoon ===
Guangdong Mingxin Chuangyi Cartoon Co., Ltd. (Simplified Chinese: 广东明星创意动画有限公司, Traditional: 廣東明星創意動畫有限公司, Pinyin: Guǎngdōng Míngxīng Chuàngyì Dònghuà Yǒuxiàngōngsī, in short 明星动画/ 明星動畫/ Míngxīng Dònghuà) (Former Happytoon Computer Entertainment Inc.), in short "MSC Co., Ltd." is a studio created by "the father of Pleasant Goat", Huang Wei-ming, after he left Creative Power Entertaining. In July 2012, he did not have enough money to make animation, so Alpha Group purchased 70% of the shares.

=== Siyue Xinkong ===
Beijing Siyue Xinkong Network Technology Co., Ltd. (Simplified Chinese: 北京四月星空网络技术有限公司, Traditional: 北京四月星空網絡技術有限公司, Pinyin: Běijīng Sìyuè Xīngkōng Wǎngluò Jìshù Yǒuxiàngōngsī) is a Chinese animation website and Cartoon business, established in May 2009, which has a Cartoon website "u17". On the evening of 11 August 2015, Alpha Animation announced it spent 904 million RMB to purchase it 100% of the shares, according "cash and stock".

=== Jia-jia Cartoon Channel ===
Guangdong Radio and Television Jia-jia Cartoon Channel (Simplified Chinese: 广东广播电视台嘉佳卡通频道, Traditional: 廣東廣播電視台嘉佳卡通頻道, Pinyin: Guǎngdōng Guǎngbò Diànshìtái Jiā Jiā Kǎtōng Píndào, in short 嘉佳卡通频道/ 嘉佳卡通頻道/ Jiā Jiā Kǎtōng Píndào) starting broadcasting on September 16, 2006, it was licensed by SARFT, and it belongs to Southern Media Group, Guangdong Radio and Television's Animation TV channels. In 2010, Alpha Animation purchased 60% of the shares, getting 30-year broadcasting rights. In the middle of 2011, Jia-jia started broadcasting to China on satellite.

== Filmography ==
=== Films ===
- Cast Away (2000)
- Armor Hero Atlas (2014)
- The Strange House (2015)
- Balala the Fairies: Princess Camellia (2015)
- Armor Hero Captor King (2016)
- Armor Hero Emperor (2010)
- Armor Hero Hunter Movie (TBA)
- Assassin's Creed (2016) (partial financing)
- Backkom Bear: Agent 008 (2017)
- Balala the Fairies: the Movie (2013)
- Meet the Pegasus (2014)
- Paris Holiday (2015)
- The Mermaid (2016)
- Pleasant Goat and Big Big Wolf – Amazing Pleasant Goat (2015)
- Pleasant Goat and Big Big Wolf - Dunk for Future (2022)
- One Hundred Thousand Bad Jokes 2 (2017)
- The Flash and Dash Movie - 3D Movie (July 12, 2021)
- Agent Backkom: Kings Bear (2021)
- Extinct (2021)
- The Revenant (2015) (partial financing)
- Super Wings Maximum Speed (2023 in China and South Korea) (2024 international)

=== Television series ===
Title	Years	Network	Notes
Super Wings	2014–present	Syndication; EBS (South Korea)	co-production with FunnyFlux Entertainment
Blazing Team: Masters of Yo Kwon Do	2015–2017	IQIYI; Discovery Family (United States)	co-production with Hasbro Studios
Rev & Roll	2019	JiaJia; Family Jr. (Canada)	co-production with DHX Media
Legends of Spark	2021	Cartoonito	
Petronix Defenders	2022	M6 & Gulli; Super RTL (Germany)	co-production with Method Animation and Palomar
Quantum Heroes Dinoster	2023–present	Animax (South Korea)	co-production with FunnyFlux Entertainment
Untitled Bernard reboot	TBA	TBA	co-production with DeAPlaneta Entertainment

- Armor Hero (2008)
- Armor Hero Captor (2015)
- Armor Hero Captor King (2017)
- Armor Hero Hunter (2018–2020)
- Armor Hero Lava (2013)
- Armor Hero XT (2011)
- Battle Strike Team: Giant Saver (2012)
- Battle Strike Team: Railway Vanguard (2020)
- Battle Strike Team: Rescue Engine (2016)
- Battle Strike Team: Space Deleter (2014)
- Balala the Fairies (2008–present)
- Blazing Teens (2006–2015)
- Blazing Teens: Legendary Warriors (Note: Considered season 5 of Blazing Teens)
- Dragon Warrior (2003–2011)
- Electro Boy (2008–2013)
- Flash and Dash (2008–2010)
- Flash and Dash S (Note: Considered season 3 of Flash and Dash) (2012)
- Go For Speed (2008)
- Happy Heroes (2010–present)
- Hover Champs (2011)
- The Family of Greenwood (2006)
- Infinity Nado (2012–present)
- Zinba (2013)
- Brinken
- King of Warrior EX (2007)
- Mask Master (2013)
- Paboo & Mojies (2012–2015)
- Peek a Boo (2021)
- Nana Moon (2013)
- Opti-Morphs/Screechers Wild! (2016)
- Pleasant Goat and Big Big Wolf (2005–present)
- The Legend of Armor Hero (2018)
- The Mechnimals (2011)
- Vary Peri (2012–2013)

== Video game ==
- Monster x Alliance 2 (怪物x联盟2) (2016), collaboration with Luo Tianyi
