= I Love Wolffy =

- Poster
- 我爱灰太狼
- Directed by: Feng Zhu
- Based on: Pleasant Goat and Big Big Wolf by Huang Weiming
- Production companies: Mr. Cartoon Pictures; Creative Power Entertaining; BestTV Media; Beijing Kaku Media; Hunan TV Aniworld Satellite TV; Pearl River Pictures; Shanghai Bright Pictures
- Distributed by: Pearl River Pictures; Mr. Cartoon Pictures; Shanghai Shanxi Entertainment
- Release date: 10 August 2012
- Running time: 91 minutes
- Country: China
- Language: Mandarin
- Box office: CN¥72.2 million

I Love Wolffy (Chinese: 我爱灰太狼) is a 2012 Chinese animated adventure comedy film directed by Feng Zhu based on the animated television series Pleasant Goat and Big Big Wolf. The film was released on 10 August 2012. It was followed by the 2013 film I Love Wolffy 2.

== Plot ==
On a sunny day, on the green grassland, Wolffy (voiced by Zhang Lin) and Pleasant Goat (voiced by Zu Liqing) are engaged in a fierce duel around the captured Lazy Goat (voiced by Liang Ying), with both sides fighting for their wits and courage. However, just as the duel enters a heated stage, the Wolf Castle suddenly shakes violently, and immediately afterward, they are inexplicably transported to an amusement park in the human world.

In order to ensure the safety of the family, the village headman uses a magical looking machine to transform them into human form. This unfamiliar world is both new and panic-filled for them, thus triggering a series of jokes. However, they soon discover a serious problem - their precious son, Little Ash, seems to have been separated from them.

Meanwhile, an evil businessman, Mr. Pi, who masterminded the plot to teleport the Wolf Castle to the human world, is now brewing a series of sinister plans full of ambition.

== Cast ==
- Na Zhao
- Ying Liang
- Qing Zu
- Quansheng Gao
- Yuting Deng
- Hongyun Liu
- Yutong Zhu
- Lin Zhang

== Reception ==
The film earned CN¥72.221 million at the Chinese box office.
