= Creative Power Entertaining =

Chinese animation company

Creative Power Entertaining Co., Ltd.
- Native name: 广东原创动力文化传播有限公司
- Type: Subsidiary
- Industry: Animation
- Founded: October 21, 2004; 22 years ago
- Founder: So Wing Lok; Lou Wing Keng
- Headquarters: 333 Jiu Fo Jian She Road, Sino-Singapore Guangzhou Knowledge City, Huangpu District, Guangzhou, Guangdong, China
- Key people: Cai Xiaodong; Wang Longfeng; He Dehua
- Products: Animation production
- Number of employees: Approx 100 to 200
- Parent: Alpha Group Co., Ltd.
- Website: www.22dm.com/index.html

Creative Power Entertaining Co., Ltd. (Note: Simplified Chinese: 广东原创动力文化传播有限公司, Traditional: 廣東原創動力文化傳播有限公司, Pinyin: Guǎngdōng Yuánchuàng Dònglì Wénhuà Chuánbō Yǒuxiàngōngsī, in short: 原创动力 / 原創動力, Yuánchuàng Dònglì) (CPE) is a Chinese animation company. Its former headquarters was in the Wuzi Block (物资大厦; 物資大廈; Wùzī Dàshà) in Yuexiu District, Guangzhou. Currently, its headquarters is located in the Creative Park at 20 Taihegang Road in the Yuexiu District of Guangzhou. In 2004 CPE released its first cartoon series: "Happy Family". Since 2005 until now, it has produced over 2,500 episodes of "Pleasant Goat and Big Big Wolf", a popular Chinese animated series. CPE's main agent was the Walt Disney Company, and in 2010 it had over 300 agents to sell its products. The company's profit margins "broke even" when Pleasant Goat became a success. In October 2010 the CPE entered in a licensing agreement with Buena Vista to air CPE cartoons in 52 countries and territories in the Asia Pacific region.

== List of Pleasant Goat and Big Big Wolf series ==
=== Television Animations ===
- Pleasant Goat and Big Big Wolf (喜羊羊与灰太狼)
  - Pleasant Goat and Big Big Wolf - Pleasant Goat Sports Game (喜羊羊与灰太狼之羊羊运动会)
  - Pleasant Goat and Big Big Wolf - Joys Of Seasons (喜羊羊与灰太狼之羊羊快乐的一年)
  - Pleasant Goat and Big Big Wolf - Smart Dodging (喜羊羊与灰太狼之奇思妙想喜羊羊)
  - Pleasant Goat and Big Big Wolf - Happy, Happy, Bang! Bang! (喜羊羊与灰太狼之给快乐加油)
  - Pleasant Goat and Big Big Wolf - The Athletic Carousel (喜羊羊与灰太狼之竞技大联盟)
  - Pleasant Goat and Big Big Wolf - The Happy Diary (喜羊羊与灰太狼之开心日记)
  - Pleasant Goat and Big Big Wolf - Happy Formula (喜羊羊与灰太狼之开心方程式)
  - Pleasant Goat and Big Big Wolf - Paddi the Amazing Chef (喜羊羊与灰太狼之懒羊羊当大厨)
  - Pleasant Goat and Big Big Wolf - Dear Little Wish (喜羊羊与灰太狼之羊羊小心愿)
  - Pleasant Goat and Big Big Wolf - The Tailor's Closet (喜羊羊与灰太狼之衣橱大冒险)
  - Pleasant Goat and Big Big Wolf - Love You Babe (喜羊羊与灰太狼之妈妈乐疯狂)
  - Pleasant Goat and Big Big Wolf - Adventures in the Primitive World (喜羊羊与灰太狼之原始世界历险记)
  - Pleasant Goat and Big Big Wolf - Marching to the New Wonderland (喜羊羊与灰太狼之嘻哈闯世界)
  - Pleasant Goat and Big Big Wolf - The Little Detective (喜羊羊与灰太狼之羊羊小侦探)
  - Pleasant Goat and Big Big Wolf - Adventures in the Sea (喜羊羊与灰太狼之深海历险记)
  - Pleasant Goat and Big Big Wolf - War of Invention (喜羊羊与灰太狼之发明大作战)
  - Pleasant Goat and Big Big Wolf - Flying Island: The Sky Adventure (喜羊羊与灰太狼之奇幻天空岛)
  - Pleasant Goat and Big Big Wolf - Mighty Little Defenders (喜羊羊与灰太狼之羊村守护者)
  - Pleasant Goat and Big Big Wolf - Rescue Across Time (喜羊羊与灰太狼之跨时空救兵)
  - Pleasant Goat and Big Big Wolf - The Intriguing Alien Guest (喜羊羊与灰太狼之奇趣外星客)
  - Pleasant Goat and Big Big Wolf - Against the Dark Force (喜羊羊与灰太狼之异国大营救)
  - Pleasant Goat and Big Big Wolf - Dunk for Victories (喜羊羊与灰太狼之筐出胜利)
  - Pleasant Goat and Big Big Wolf - Ultimate Battle: The Next Generation (喜羊羊与灰太狼之决战次时代)
  - Pleasant Goat and Big Big Wolf - The Great Rescue (喜羊羊与灰太狼之奇妙大营救)
- Happy Family (宝贝女儿好妈妈)
  - Happy Family - Family of Joy (宝贝女儿好妈妈之快乐的家庭)
- Cookie Master (小宋当家)
- Planet of 7 Colors (七色战记)
- Legendary Soccer Kid (宋代足球小将)

=== Web Animations ===
- Pleasant Goat and Big Big Wolf series
  - Pleasant Goat and Big Big Wolf - Around the World in 20 Days (喜羊羊与灰太狼之喜羊羊游世博)
  - Pleasant Goat and Big Big Wolf - Everyday Pleasant Goat (喜羊羊与灰太狼之洋洋得意喜羊羊)
  - Pleasant Goat and Big Big Wolf - Man Jing Tou (喜羊羊与灰太狼之漫镜头)
  - Pleasant Goat Fun Class subseries
    - Pleasant Goat Fun Class: Animals & Plants (智趣羊学堂 动植物篇)
    - Pleasant Goat Fun Class: Sports are Fun (智趣羊学堂 运动篇)
    - Pleasant Goat Fun Class: The Earth Carnival (智趣羊学堂之地球嘉年华)
    - Pleasant Goat Fun Class: Travel Around the World (智趣羊学堂之羊羊游世界)
    - Pleasant Goat Fun Class: Idiom World (智趣羊学堂之奇幻成语书)
    - Pleasant Goat Fun Class: Finding Treasures (智趣羊学堂之羊羊来寻宝)
  - Mighty Goat Squad (羊羊趣冒险)
  - Mighty Goat Squad 2 (羊羊趣冒险2)
  - Mr.Wolffy, Mr.Right! (嫁人就嫁灰太狼)
- Fun Alliance (欢乐大联盟)

=== Animated films ===
- Pleasant Goat and Big Big Wolf series
  - Pleasant Goat and Big Big Wolf - The Super Adventure (喜羊羊与灰太狼之牛气冲天)
  - Pleasant Goat and Big Big Wolf – Desert Trek: The Adventure of the Lost Totem (喜羊羊与灰太狼之虎虎生威/喜羊羊與灰太狼之虎膽羊威)
  - Pleasant Goat and Big Big Wolf – Moon Castle: The Space Adventure (喜羊羊与灰太狼之兔年顶呱呱)
  - Pleasant Goat and Big Big Wolf – Mission Incredible: Adventures on the Dragon's Trail (喜羊羊与灰太狼之开心闯龙年)
  - Pleasant Goat and Big Big Wolf – The Mythical Ark: Adventures in Love & Happiness (喜羊羊与灰太狼之喜气羊羊过蛇年)
  - Pleasant Goat and Big Big Wolf – Meet the Pegasus (喜羊羊与灰太狼之飞马奇遇记)
  - Pleasant Goat and Big Big Wolf – Amazing Pleasant Goat (喜羊羊与灰太狼之羊年喜羊羊)
  - Pleasant Goat and Big Big Wolf - Dunk for Future (喜羊羊与灰太狼大电影：筐出未来)
  - Pleasant Goat and Big Big Wolf: The World Guardians (喜羊羊与灰太狼之守护)
  - Pleasant Goat and Big Big Wolf: Bright New Dawn (喜羊羊与灰太狼之异国破晓)
  - Pleasant Goat and Big Big Wolf: Dunk for Future 2 (喜羊羊与灰太狼大电影之筐出未来2)
- Happy Family series
  - Happy Family - Snowball the Memory Gobbler (宝贝女儿好妈妈之吃记忆的大雪球)
- Soccer Kid

==== Live-action animated films ====
- Pleasant Goat and Big Big Wolf series
  - Pleasant Goat and Big Big Wolf - I Love Wolffy (喜羊羊与灰太狼之我爱灰太狼)
  - Pleasant Goat and Big Big Wolf - I Love Wolffy 2 (喜羊羊与灰太狼之我爱灰太狼2)

== Law case ==
In Lianyungang, Jiangsu province, boys tied their friends up the branch, and under it is the fire, like the wolf in the Pleasant Goat and Big Big Wolf. In December 2013, a local court in China's Jiangsu province held the producers of the show partially liable for injuries caused to two five-year-old boys as they were imitating scenes from the show, and ordered them to pay 15% of their medical bills (39 thousand RMB). The verdict sparked debate about the effects of watching cartoon violence on Chinese television.
