= Pleasant Goat and Big Big Wolf: Dunk for Future =

- Poster
- Traditional Chinese: 喜羊羊與灰太狼之筐出未來
- Simplified Chinese: 喜羊羊与灰太狼之筐出未来
- Hanyu Pinyin: Xǐ Yángyáng Yǔ Huī Tàiláng Zhī Kuāng Chū Wèilái
- Jyutping: Héi^{2} Yêng^{4}yêng^{4} Yü^{5} Fui^{1} Tai^{3}long^{4} Zi^{1} Kuang^{1} Cêd^{1} Méi^{6}loi^{4}
- Directed by: Huang Weiming; Huang Junming; Chen Lijin
- Written by: Wu Chaowei; Geng Yimiao; Liu Zemin; Liu Wei
- Based on: Pleasant Goat and Big Big Wolf by Huang Weiming
- Produced by: Huang Xiaoxue; Kinny Choi; Hou Zhiyun
- Starring: Zu Qing; Zhang Lin; Deng Yuting; Liang Ying; Liu Hongyun; Gao Quansheng; Li Tuan; Zhao Na
- Edited by: Sun Caixia; Chen Kaiqi; Wu Xueli; Yu Jieqi; Huang Ziyin; Xian Jingwen; Liu Jialin; Lu Qingli
- Music by: Vicky Fong; Zhan Zhuo'an
- Production companies: Alpha Group; Creative Power Entertaining; Shanghai Tao Piao Piao Movie and TV Culture; Zhejiang Dong Yang Microcosmic Pictures; Youku Information Technology (Beijing); Guangdong Mingxing Chuangyi Cartoon; Universe Century Film Distribution; Beijing Weimeng Chuangke Network Technology
- Distributed by: Zhejiang Dong Yang Microcosmic Pictures; China Film Group Number Film; EISA (Beijing) Culture Media
- Release date: February 1, 2022 (Mainland China)
- Running time: 94 minutes
- Country: China
- Languages: Mandarin; Cantonese
- Budget: CN¥35 million
- Box office: CN¥160.331 million ($25 million)

Pleasant Goat and Big Big Wolf: Dunk for Future (Chinese: 喜羊羊与灰太狼之筐出未来; pinyin: Xǐ Yángyáng Yǔ Huī Tàiláng Zhī Kuāng Chū Wèilái; lit. 'Pleasant Goat and Big Big Wolf: Put Future into the Basket') is a 2022 Chinese animated film based on Dunk for Victories, the thirty-fourth season of the Pleasant Goat and Big Big Wolf television series. It is preceded by Pleasant Goat and Big Big Wolf – Amazing Pleasant Goat (2015).

== Plot ==
Weslie (Voiced by Zu Liqing), Wolffy (Voiced by Zhang Lin) and other goats formed a basketball team called "Team Defenders" and with all the attentions and expectations, "Team Defenders" made their way to the world-class basketball event---The Basketball City Cup. They were the most competitive team to grasp the trophy but they lost it unexpectedly because of the last shot of discord. The team seemed to fall away when Weslie and Wolffy had a dispute after the finals, Wolffy stated that Weslie should have passed the ball to him for the final shot since Weslie's foot injured during the game with "Team Tigers", while Weslie disagreed as he suggested that Wolffy's shots were constant failed shots which makes no difference to the game results. However, their passion for getting the trophy of the basketball game as well as true friendships will not be destroyed easily. Jonie (Voiced by Deng Yuting) decided to assemble the members again and reform the "Team Defenders" to join the next Basketball City Cup. However their opponents were more challenged, if they wanted to get the basketball championship this time, they must face the challenge with even more efforts.

== Voice cast ==
=== Team Defenders ===
- Zu Qing - Weslie
- Zhang Lin - Wolffy
- Deng Yuting - Tibbie / Jonie
- Liang Ying - Paddi
- Liu Hongyun - Sparky
- Gao Quansheng - Slowy
- Li Tuan - Blazey

=== Team Tigers ===
- Deng Yuting - Tiger Wing
- Gao Quansheng - Sierra

=== Team Wolves ===
- Deng Yuting - Victor

=== Other characters ===
- Zhao Na - Wolnie / Leopardess
- Liang Ying - Wilie
- Li Tuan - Tiger Dad / Lion Jay

== Production ==
In an internal interview with the Director of this film as well as the creator of "Pleasant Goat and Big Big Wolf", Huang Weiming stated that despite the low box office earnings of the previous film, Amazing Pleasant Goat in 2015, the production team had not written off investing in more film productions, since the previous films had already covered different types of adventures in different themes. It is hoped that innovation is not the only thing they pursue but a real breakthrough when choosing the theme for a new film.

In 2017, the production team members had a thought of combining the animation with their favorite sport: basketball. In the series "Dunk for Victories" of the Pleasant Goat and Big Big Wolf TV series, which aired in 2021, had proved that this combination was successful, earning an 8.6 out of 10 score on Douban, and caused heated discussion in Hupu, a famous Chinese sports blog. The film's production started soon after that. In order to make the best film, the team made a total of 37 scripts, 74 storyboards, and 2,142 shots for trial and error during the whole film production. The production team hoped that this film would become the best film for families during the Chinese New Year.

== Music ==
Type	Name	Composed by	Lyrics by	Sung by
Theme song	Biekan Wo Zhi Shi Yizhi Yang 2022	Ivy Koo, Chen Yu	Ivy Koo, Wang Zhongqiao	Bibi Zhou
Episode	Jiushi Guanjun	Deng Ziqi	Tan Zihao	Luo Weiluo
Episode	Nifeng Shengzhang	Huang Chengcheng	Cui Shixuan	Lu Shilang
Episode	Guan Lan Qingchun	Lu Shilang	Lu Shilang	Lu Shilang

== Release ==
The film was released on 1 February 2022, the First Day of Chinese New Year in Mainland China, alongside various other highly anticipated films including The Battle at Lake Changjin II, Nice View, Only Fools Rush In, and Too Cool to Kill etc. As a result, the number of showings of the film were less than expected, in which, only 3 to 4 percent of showings were scheduled for this film and the time of showings were also less ideal.

== Reception ==
=== Box office ===
Four days of preview screenings were held in January 2022 in Mainland China, from 15–16 January and 22–23 January. According to "Tao Piao Piao", the film grossed 10.93 million Renminbi from these screenings.

By 31 January 2022, the film grossed more than 20 million Renminbi from the sales of advance tickets. The film had an opening day of CN¥25.87 million (US$4.07 million) ending up 7th under Sniper. The film went on to have a US$9.88 million three-day opening and a US$13.41 million five-day opening. By its first Sunday, the film had grossed CN¥102 million (US$15.36 million), already surpassing the total grossess of the previous two films in the franchise.
