= I Love Wolffy 2 =

- Poster
- 我爱灰太狼2
- Directed by: Kai Ye
- Based on: Pleasant Goat and Big Big Wolf by Huang Weiming
- Production companies: Mr. Cartoon Pictures; Creative Power Entertaining; Beijing Kaku Media; BestTV Media; Nanjing Radio and TV Station; Pearl River Pictures; Beijing Hangmei Entertainment
- Distributed by: Mr. Cartoon Pictures; Pearl River Pictures; Beijing Huaying Kongjian Investment; Zhejiang Hengdian Film Distribution; Shanghai Huayu Film; Golden Harvest Entertainment; ChongQiang Poly WanHe Theater Chain; Shanghai Shanxi Entertainment
- Release date: 1 August 2013
- Running time: 88 minutes
- Country: China
- Language: Mandarin
- Box office: CN¥75.5 million

I Love Wolffy 2 (Chinese: 我爱灰太狼2) is a 2013 Chinese animated comedy film directed by Kai Ye based on the animated television series Pleasant Goat and Big Big Wolf. It was preceded by the 2012 film I Love Wolffy. The film was released on 1 August 2013.

== Cast ==
- Yingjun Zhao
- Zixuan Wang
- Jingsen Cai
- Taneem Mannan

== Reception ==
The film earned CN¥75.509 million at the Chinese box office.
