= Xing Ying =

Chinese-language author (b. 1911, d. 1967)

Yang Fangjie (1911 — 5 January 1967), better known by his pen name Xing Ying, Yang Shoumo and by various other pen names including Gongsun Ze, Liqi and Aiyusheng, was a pioneering writer and prominent editor of several Chinese-language literary supplements in Singapore.

== Early life and education ==
Yang was born in 1911 in Jianyang, Sichuan. His father was Yang Caoxian, a prominent calligrapher. His father brought him to Tokyo, where he completed his secondary and tertiary education. While in Japan, he became proficient in Mandarin, English and Japanese.

== Career ==
Yang moved to Chongqing in 1936, and began publishing articles and translations. In 1941, he moved to India, where he met several writers, including Li Rulin. While there, he published in non-fiction prose in several Chinese-language newspapers. After the end of World War II, he moved to Singapore along with several of the writers that he had met while in India, including Li. In 1947, he was employed at the Nanyang Siang Pau as a translator. In 1949, he became a teacher of The Chinese High School. He published his works in several magazines, including the Saturday Review, the Nanyang Weekly, The Ranks of Literature and Arts, as well as in the literary supplements of the Nanyang Siang Pau. From 1954 to 1967, he served as the editor of the newspaper's supplements. He was also an editor of several literary supplements, including Literary Wind, New Sprouts, Nanyang Park and Youth Literature and Arts. He strongly encouraged younger writers to write more, and several writers later claimed that they had persisted in writing due to his guidance. Among his published works were Reading and Writing, While You Are Still Young, Books and People, The Century of Fools and Random Thoughts and Writings.

== Death ==
Yang died at the Singapore General Hospital on 5 January 1967. Following his death, the publication of the literary supplement Youth Literature and Arts ceased. In 1973, the Literary Wind Series book series was published to commemorate him.
