= Shanghai Film Group =

Chinese production company

Shanghai Film Group Corporation

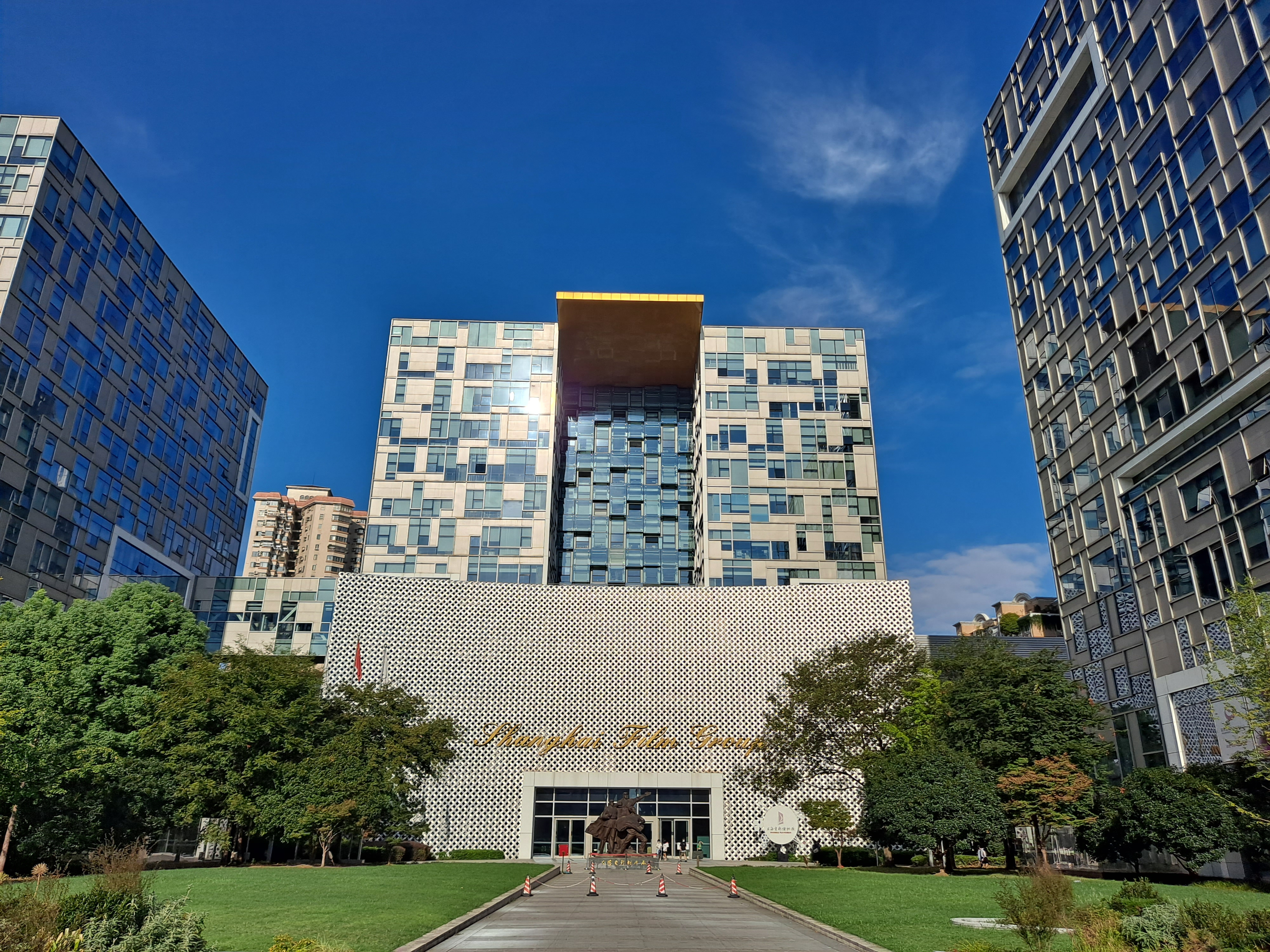
- Traded as: SSE: 601595
- Industry: film production, animations, dubbing
- Founded: 2001
- Headquarters: Shanghai, China
- Key people: Ren Zhonglun (President)
- Products: films, movies, TV series
- Website: http://www.sfs-cn.com/

Shanghai Film Group Corporation (Chinese: 上海電影集團公司) is a film, animation and documentary production company running several studios all of which are located in Shanghai, China. In 2001, it was announced to be part of a combination of a number of companies, operating under the Shanghai Media & Entertainment Group conglomerate until 2014, when it was split again.

== History ==
Many of the individual entertainment production hubs were the center of art and culture for the country going as far back as the 1890s. After the establishment of the People's Republic of China in 1950, numerous studios were established in session all around Shanghai. Many would merge with smaller companies that offer similar functions.

By January 2017, Shanghai Film Group was the second largest film exhibitor in China behind Dalian Wanda Group. On January 19, 2017, Shanghai Film Group Corp. and Huahua Media said they would finance at least 25% of all Paramount Pictures movies over a three-year period. Shanghai Film Group and Huahua Media, in the deal, would help distribute and market Paramount's features in China.

== Studios today ==
While all the studios are located in Shanghai, they do not all function within the same facility. A number of studios have gone through different name changes throughout the years. Shanghai Film Studio has been the main component for the company.

Studio English Name	Studio Chinese Name	Description
Shanghai Film Studio	上海电影制片厂	Responsible for movies and TV productions in China.
Shanghai Animation Film Studio	上海美術電影製片廠	Responsible for Chinese animations.
Shanghai Documentary Film Studio		Responsible for documentaries.
Shanghai Dubbing Studio	上海电影译制厂	Responsible for the translation of foreign programs.

== Properties ==
- SFG owns additional groups to carry out marketing, film rental, tech support, and other hi-tech labs functions.
- SFG owns 5 large film production enterprises, 14 TV-series productions enterprises with a large filming facility as of 2006.
- Owns the East-Movie-Channel.
- They have the largest cinema circuit in China with 75 cinemas and 198 screens, "Shanghai United Circuit's" box office in 2003 and 2004 was topping the list in China.
- Currently SFG owns over 640 feature films, 30,000 mins of animation films, 1,555 documentary films and about 10,000 episodes of TV series.
