= List of highest-grossing animated films =

Included in the list are charts of the top box-office earners, a chart of high-grossing animated films by the calendar year, a timeline showing the transition of the highest-grossing animated film record, and a chart of the highest-grossing animated film franchises and series. All charts are ranked by international theatrical box office performance where possible, excluding income derived from home video, broadcasting rights, and merchandise.

Animated family films have performed consistently well at the box office, with Disney enjoying lucrative re-releases prior to the home video, who have produced films such as The Lion King and Aladdin, both of which were the highest-grossing animated film of all time upon their respective releases. Disney Animation also enjoyed later success with the Zootopia and Frozen films, in addition to Pixar, of which the films from the Toy Story, Inside Out, Finding Nemo, and Incredibles franchises have been the best performers. Beyond Disney and Pixar, other franchises such as Despicable Me, Shrek, Ice Age, the Fengshen Cinematic Universe, Super Mario, Kung Fu Panda, and Madagascar have been met with the most success. Additionally, the current highest-grossing animated film is Ne Zha 2, a Chinese film that has grossed over $2 billion worldwide, the first-ever animated film to reach $2 billion worldwide.

An animated feature film is defined as a motion picture with a running time of more than 40 minutes, in which movement and characters' performances are created using a frame-by-frame technique. Motion capture by itself is not an animation technique. In addition, a significant number of the major characters must be animated, and animation must figure in no less than 75 per cent of the picture's running time.

— Rule Seven – Special Rules for the Animated Feature Film Award: I. Definition

== Highest-grossing animated films ==
The chart below lists the highest-grossing animated films. Figures are given in United States dollars (USD). Many films that were released during the 20th century do not appear on this list as figures have not been adjusted for inflation, and as a result the films on this list have all had a theatrical run (including re-releases) since 2005. Films that have not played since then do not appear on the chart due to ticket price inflation, population size, and ticket purchasing trends not being considered. If inflation were adjusted for, Snow White and the Seven Dwarfs would appear at the top of the chart with an adjusted gross of $2,354,000,000. (Note: Inflation adjustment is carried out using the International Monetary Fund's global Consumer price index for advanced economies. The index is uniformly applied to the grosses in the chart published by Guinness World Records in 2014, beginning with the 2014 index. The figures in the above chart take into account inflation that occurred in 2014, and in every available year since then, with 2024 the most recent year available.) All except the original 1994 version of The Lion King and Demon Slayer: Kimetsu no Yaiba Infinity Castle, which are traditionally animated films, are computer-animated films. Despicable Me is the most represented franchise with five films in the top 50 highest-grossing animated films. 2016 is the most prominent year, with five films released that year occupying spots. The top 17 films on this list have each grossed in excess of $1 billion worldwide, while the top 13 rank among the top 50 highest-grossing films of all time.

† Background shading indicates films playing in the week commencing 20 November 2026 in theaters around the world.

Highest-grossing animated films
Rank	Peak	Title	Worldwide gross	Year	Ref
1	1	Ne Zha 2 (Note: The worldwide total for Ne Zha 2 at Box Office Mojo is incorrect. Box Office Mojo has altered its figure for the Chinese release several times since the film closed, and remains inconsistent (first by low-balling, and now over-shooting) with the figure available from Chinese sources. Box Office Mojo's record of non-Chinese grosses is also incomplete, meaning the true non-Chinese total is higher than the figure Box Office Mojo has down. For this reason the gross here is compiled from alternative sources.)	$2,217,758,382	2025	
2	2	Zootopia 2	$1,870,309,291	2025	
3	1	Inside Out 2	$1,698,863,816	2024	
4	1	The Lion King (Note: Disney, which produced The Lion King (2019), considered the film to be live-action despite the entire film (aside from its opening shot) being computer animated. Others, such as the Hollywood Foreign Press Association (then-presenter of the Golden Globe Awards), deemed it to be animated based on specified criteria.) (Note: An error in Box Office Mojo's gross estimate for the 2020 UK re-release of The Lion King (2019) led to an overestimation of the film's lifetime worldwide gross by approximately $5 million. As of September 1, 2024, BOM removed the mistake, but only amended the total from $1,663,079,059 to $1,662,020,819, which does not fully account for $5 million over-estimate; however, a summation of the individual releases section produces $1,658,058,299. Until this discrepancy is resolved, the gross based on its original theatrical run will be used.)	$1,662,020,819	2019	
5	2	Frozen II	$1,451,651,316	2019	
6	3	The Super Mario Bros. Movie	$1,360,783,214	2023	
7	1	Frozen	$1,290,000,000	2013	(Note: Frozen: "Frozen (2013) – International Box Office Results". Box Office Mojo. Archived from the original on August 9, 2014. "Worldwide – $1,274,219,009 (total as of August 8, 2014; including Japanese gross up to August 3, Spain gross up to July 27 and omitting Nigerian gross)"; "Frozen (2013) – International Box Office Results: Japan". Box Office Mojo. Archived from the original on September 15, 2014.; Total as of August 3, 2014: $219,837,363 Total as of August 31, 2014: $249,036,646: "Frozen (2013) – International Box Office Results: Spain". Box Office Mojo. Archived from the original on October 19, 2014.; Total as of July 27, 2014: $231,668,597 Total as of November 2, 2014: $22,492,845: "Frozen (2013) – International Box Office Results: Nigeria". Box Office Mojo. Archived from the original on September 5, 2014.; Total as of August 17, 2014: $167,333: "Frozen (2013) – International Box Office Results: United Kingdom". Box Office Mojo. Archived from the original on October 19, 2014.; Total as of June 8, 2014: £39,090,985 Total as of November 30, 2014: £40,960,083 ($1 = £0.63866) Total as of December 7, 2014: £41,087,765 ($1 = £0.64136) Total as of December 14, 2014: £41,170,608 ($1 = £0.636) Total as of November 26, 2017: £42,840,559 ($1 = £0.7497) Total as of December 3, 2017: £42,976,318 ($1 = £0.742): "Frozen (2013) – International Box Office Results: Germany". Box Office Mojo. Archived from the original on March 22, 2016.; Total as of March 30, 2014: €35,098,170 Total as of October 18, 2015: €42,526,744 nb. the exact euro-to-dollar conversion rate is unknown for earnings since April 2014, but the euro never fell below parity with the dollar during 2014 and 2015 (as can be verified by comparing the exchange rate on the individual date entries at the provided reference) so an approximate conversion rate of €1:$1 is used here to give a lower bound.)
8	2	Incredibles 2	$1,243,225,667	2018	
9	2	Minions	$1,159,457,503	2015	
10	10	Toy Story 5	$1,149,545,392	2026	
11	5	Toy Story 4	$1,073,841,394	2019	
12	1	Toy Story 3	$1,068,879,522	2010	
13	10	Moana 2	$1,059,269,477	2024	
14	4	Despicable Me 3	$1,034,800,131	2017	
15	4	Finding Dory	$1,029,266,989	2016	
16	4	Zootopia	$1,023,784,195	2016	
17	16	The Super Mario Galaxy Movie	$1,013,286,300	2026	
18	14	Despicable Me 4	$986,706,425	2024	
19	2	Despicable Me 2	$975,216,835	2013	
20	1	The Lion King	$970,707,763	1994	(Note: The Lion King: Total: "The Lion King (1994)". Box Office Mojo. "Worldwide: $970,707,763; Production Budget: $45 million"; Lifetime grosses (US & Canada): "The Lion King (1994) – Release Summary". Box Office Mojo. "Initial: $312,855,561; IMAX: $15,686,215; 3D: $94,242,001"; Lifetime grosses (outside U.S. & Canada): Brevert, Brad (May 29, 2016). "'X-Men' & 'Alice' Lead Soft Memorial Day Weekend; Disney Tops $4 Billion Worldwide". Box Office Mojo. "...the original release of The Lion King made $450.6 million internationally, an additional $3.8 million with the 2002 IMAX reissue, and another $91.3 million from 2011's 3D reissue for an international total of $545.7 million."; As of 2010: Block & Wilson 2010, p. 764. "Production Cost: $79.3 (Unadjusted $s in Millions of $s).")
21	1	Finding Nemo	$941,637,960	2003	
22	14	Minions: The Rise of Gru	$940,482,695	2022	
23	1	Shrek 2	$933,848,612	2004	
24	2	Ice Age: Dawn of the Dinosaurs	$886,686,817	2009	
25	6	Ice Age: Continental Drift	$877,244,782	2012	
26	12	The Secret Life of Pets	$875,698,161	2016	
27	10	Inside Out	$859,076,254	2015	
28	15	Coco	$814,641,172	2017	
29	3	Shrek the Third	$813,367,380	2007	
30	27	Demon Slayer: Kimetsu no Yaiba Infinity Castle	$793,594,078	2025	
31	7	Shrek Forever After	$752,600,867	2010	
32	9	Madagascar 3: Europe's Most Wanted	$746,921,274	2012	
33	11	Monsters University	$743,559,645	2013	
34	23	Ne Zha	$742,718,496	2019	(Note: Ne Zha Gross: China – $723,650,000; United States, United Kingdom, Australia, New Zealand, and Vietnam – $6,307,704)
35	6	Up	$735,099,082	2009	
36	32	Mufasa: The Lion King	$722,631,756	2024	
37	28	Spider-Man: Across the Spider-Verse	$690,824,738	2023	
38	4	Ice Age: The Meltdown	$667,094,506	2006	
39	9	Kung Fu Panda 2	$665,692,281	2011	
40	16	Big Hero 6	$657,870,525	2014	
41	22	Moana	$643,332,467	2016	
42	23	Sing	$634,338,409	2016	
43	6	Kung Fu Panda	$632,091,832	2008	
44	4	The Incredibles	$631,688,498	2004	
45	7	Ratatouille	$623,729,380	2007	
46	19	How to Train Your Dragon 2	$621,537,519	2014	
47	9	Madagascar: Escape 2 Africa	$603,900,354	2008	
48	14	Tangled	$591,806,017	2010	
49	18	The Croods	$587,266,745	2013	
50	2	Monsters, Inc.	$579,770,299	2001	

== Highest-grossing animated films by animation type ==
=== Computer animation ===
The following chart is a list of the highest-grossing computer-animated films. The films on this list have all had a theatrical run (including re-releases) since 2005.

All feature films in the , Finding Nemo, Incredibles, Frozen, Inside Out, Zootopia, Moana, and Super Mario franchises, as well as the main films in the Madagascar franchise are on the list, while the Kung Fu Panda, Shrek, Ice Age and Toy Story franchises feature often.

The top 48 films listed are also among the 50 highest-grossing animated films and the top 12 are among the 50 highest-grossing films, each having grossed in excess of $1.05 billion worldwide.

† Background shading indicates films playing in the week commencing 20 November 2026 in theaters around the world.

Highest-grossing computer-animated films
Rank	Title	Worldwide gross	Year	Ref
1	Ne Zha 2	$2,217,758,382	2025	
2	Zootopia 2	$1,870,309,291	2025	
3	Inside Out 2	$1,698,863,816	2024	
4	The Lion King	$1,662,020,819	2019	
5	Frozen 2	$1,450,026,933	2019	
6	The Super Mario Bros. Movie	$1,360,783,214	2023	
7	Frozen	$1,290,000,000	2013	
8	Incredibles 2	$1,242,805,359	2018	
9	Minions	$1,159,457,503	2015	
10	Toy Story 5	$1,149,545,392	2026	
11	Toy Story 4	$1,073,841,394	2019	
12	Toy Story 3	$1,068,879,522	2010	
13	Moana 2	$1,059,269,477	2024	
14	Despicable Me 3	$1,034,800,131	2017	
15	Finding Dory	$1,029,266,989	2016	
16	Zootopia	$1,023,784,195	2016	
17	The Super Mario Galaxy Movie	$1,013,286,300	2026	
18	Despicable Me 4	$986,706,425	2024	
19	Despicable Me 2	$975,216,835	2013	
20	Finding Nemo	$941,637,960	2003	
21	Minions: The Rise of Gru	$940,482,695	2022	
22	Shrek 2	$933,848,612	2004	
23	Ice Age: Dawn of the Dinosaurs	$886,686,817	2009	
24	Ice Age: Continental Drift	$877,244,782	2012	
25	The Secret Life of Pets	$875,698,161	2016	
26	Inside Out	$859,076,254	2015	
27	Coco	$814,641,172	2017	
28	Shrek the Third	$813,367,380	2007	
29	Shrek Forever After	$752,600,867	2010	
30	Madagascar 3: Europe's Most Wanted	$746,921,274	2012	
31	Monsters University	$743,559,607	2013	
32	Ne Zha	$742,718,496	2019	(Note: Ne Zha Gross: China – $723,650,000; United States, United Kingdom, Australia, New Zealand, and Vietnam – $6,307,704)
33	Up	$735,099,082	2009	
34	Mufasa: The Lion King	$722,631,756	2024	
35	Spider-Man: Across the Spider-Verse	$690,824,738	2023	
36	Ice Age: The Meltdown	$667,094,506	2006	
37	Kung Fu Panda 2	$665,692,281	2011	
38	Big Hero 6	$657,827,828	2014	
39	Moana	$643,332,467	2016	
40	Sing	$634,338,409	2016	
41	Kung Fu Panda	$632,091,832	2008	
42	The Incredibles	$631,688,498	2004	
43	Ratatouille	$623,729,380	2007	
44	How to Train Your Dragon 2	$621,537,519	2014	
45	Madagascar: Escape 2 Africa	$603,900,354	2008	
46	Tangled	$591,806,017	2010	
47	The Croods	$587,204,668	2013	
48	Monsters, Inc.	$579,770,299	2001	
49	Cars 2	$559,853,036	2011	
50	Puss in Boots	$554,987,477	2011	

=== Stop motion animation ===
A total of 41 stop motion films have grossed in excess of $1 million. All feature films in the Wallace & Gromit and Shaun the Sheep franchises are included, with Wallace and Gromit being the most represented franchise on the list, with four films. The films on this list have all had a theatrical run (including re-releases) since 1975.

† Background shading indicates films playing in the week commencing 20 November 2026 in theaters around the world.

Highest-grossing stop motion films
Rank	Title	Worldwide gross	Year	Ref
1	Chicken Run	$224,888,359	2000	
2	Wallace & Gromit: The Curse of the Were-Rabbit	$192,781,882	2005	
3	Coraline	$185,860,104	2009	
4	The Pirates! In an Adventure with Scientists!	$123,069,765	2012	
5	Corpse Bride	$117,237,680	2005	
6	Shaun the Sheep Movie	$110,549,295	2015	
7	The Boxtrolls	$108,255,770	2014	
8	The Nightmare Before Christmas	$107,800,040	1993	
9	ParaNorman	$107,139,399	2012	
10	The Little Prince	$97,571,250	2015	
11	Frankenweenie	$85,613,658	2012	
12	Kubo and the Two Strings	$76,249,438	2016	
13	Isle of Dogs	$72,994,420	2018	
14	Wildwood †	$72,896,623	2026	
15	Fantastic Mr. Fox	$58,092,014	2009	
16	Early Man	$54,629,139	2018	
17	A Shaun the Sheep Movie: Farmageddon	$43,133,089	2019	
18	James and the Giant Peach	$28,946,127	1996	
19	Missing Link	$26,565,710	2019	
20	Shaun the Sheep: The Beast of Mossy Bottom †	$25,396,973	2026	
21	Louis & Luca and the Snow Machine	$12,345,881	2013	
22	Memoir of a Snail	$7,643,123	2024	
23	Monkeybone	$7,622,365	2001	
24	Marcel the Shell with Shoes On	$7,103,547	2022	
25	The Pinchcliffe Grand Prix	$6,439,069	1975	
26	My Life as a Zucchini	$5,873,157	2016	
27	Anomalisa	$5,659,286	2015	
28	In the Forest of Huckybucky	$5,295,452	2016	
29	Louis and Luca – The Big Cheese Race	$5,204,792	2015	
30	Louis & Luca - Mission to the Moon	$4,977,748	2018	
31	Cheburashka	$3,565,391	2010	
32	Max & Co	$2,373,726	2008	
33	The Inventor	$2,061,835	2023	
34	Shaun the Sheep: The Flight Before Christmas	$2,027,525	2022	
35	The Sandman and The Lost Sand of Dreams	$1,767,918	2010	
36	Mary and Max	$1,740,791	2009	
37	Even Mice Belong in Heaven	$1,505,235	2021	
38	No Dogs or Italians Allowed	$1,395,922	2022	
39	Miffy the Movie	$1,371,484	2013	
40	31 Minutos, La Película	$1,254,585	2011	
41	Wallace & Gromit: The Best of Aardman Animation	$1,009,577	1996	

=== Traditional animation ===
The following chart is a list of the highest-grossing traditionally-animated films. The Disaster trilogy is the most frequent franchise thereon, with three films. SpongeBob SquarePants, Demon Slayer: Kimetsu no Yaiba and Detective Conan have two titles each. The top two films on this list are also among the top 50 highest-grossing animated films.

† Background shading indicates films playing in the week commencing 20 November 2026 in theaters around the world.

Highest-grossing traditionally animated films
Rank	Title	Worldwide gross	Year	Ref
1	The Lion King	$970,707,763	1994	
2	Demon Slayer: Kimetsu no Yaiba Infinity Castle	$793,594,078	2025	
3	The Simpsons Movie	$536,414,293	2007	
4	Demon Slayer: Kimetsu no Yaiba Mugen Train	$512,704,063	2020	
5	Aladdin	$504,050,219	1992	
6	Tarzan	$448,191,819	1999	
7	Beauty and the Beast	$438,656,843	1991	
8	Snow White and the Seven Dwarfs	$418,200,000	1937	(Note: Snow White and the Seven Dwarfs: Total prior to 50th anniversary reissue: Culhane, John (July 12, 1987). "'Snow White' At 50: Undimmed Magic". The New York Times. Archived from the original on June 4, 2014. "By now, it has grossed about $330 million worldwide – so it remains one of the most popular films ever made."; 1987 and 1993 grosses from North America: "Snow White and the Seven Dwarfs – Releases". Box Office Mojo. Archived from the original on May 29, 2014. "1987 release – $46,594,212; 1993 release – $41,634,471")
9	Your Name	$405,349,022	2016	
10	Spirited Away	$395,802,070	2001	
11	The Jungle Book	$378,000,000	1967	
12	Pocahontas	$346,079,773	1995	
13	The Hunchback of Notre Dame	$325,338,851	1996	(Note: The Hunchback of Notre Dame: "The Hunchback of Notre Dame (1996)". Box Office Mojo. Archived from the original on September 5, 2014.)
14	The SpongeBob Movie: Sponge Out of Water	$325,186,032	2015	
15	Suzume	$324,432,115	2022	
16	The Boy and the Heron	$304,800,000	2023	
17	Mulan	$304,320,254	1998	
18	One Hundred and One Dalmatians	$303,000,000	1961	
19	The First Slam Dunk	$281,094,722	2022	
20	Lilo & Stitch	$273,144,151	2002	
21	The Princess and the Frog	$270,997,378	2009	
22	Bambi	$267,447,150	1942	
23	Cinderella	$263,591,415	1950	
24	Hercules	$252,712,101	1997	
25	Brother Bear	$250,397,798	2003	
26	Howl's Moving Castle	$241,281,521	2004	
27	Nobody	$235,930,000	2025	
28	The Little Mermaid	$233,000,000	1989	
29	Princess Mononoke	$231,379,818	1997	
30	The Prince of Egypt	$218,613,188	1998	
31	Ponyo	$206,498,543	2008	
32	One Piece Film: Red	$201,387,600	2022	
33	Jujutsu Kaisen 0	$196,436,179	2021	
34	Weathering with You	$193,091,764	2019	
35	The Aristocats	$191,000,000	1970	
36	Lady and the Tramp	$187,000,000	1955	
37	Atlantis: The Lost Empire	$186,053,725	2001	
38	Chainsaw Man – The Movie: Reze Arc	$181,115,803	2025	
39	Pokémon: The First Movie	$172,744,662	1998	
40	The Emperor's New Groove	$169,661,687	2000	
41	The Rescuers	$169,000,000	1977	
42	Detective Conan: One-eyed Flashback	$166,061,012	2025	
43	Pinocchio	$164,000,000	1940	
44	Chiikawa the Movie: The Secret of the Mermaid Island †	$159,000,000	2026	
45	Detective Conan: The Million-dollar Pentagram	$150,008,115	2024	
46	Arrietty	$149,411,550	2010	
47	Home on the Range	$145,358,062	2004	
48	Peter Pan	$145,000,000	1953	
49	The SpongeBob SquarePants Movie	$142,051,255	2004	
50	The Rugrats Movie	$140,894,675	1998	

== Highest-grossing animated films by year ==
The top-grossing animated films in the years 1937, 1940, 1942, 1950, 1953, 1955, 1961, 1967, 1992, 1994, 2003, 2004, 2010, 2013, 2020, 2024, and 2025 were also the highest-grossing films overall those years.

Computer-animated films have been the highest earners in 1995, 1998–2019, and every year since 2021 while 1975 and 1993 are the only years when a stop motion animated feature grossed the highest. Traditional animated films have topped every other year.

The Toy Story and Ice Age franchises have had the most entries be the highest-grossing animated films of the year with four films, while the Rescuers and Finding Nemo all had both films in each respective franchise be the highest-grossing animated films of the year they were released.

Disney films has topped the list the most of any studio topping the list 32 times.

Animal Farm, Out of an Old Man's Head, Fritz the Cat, Demon Slayer: Kimetsu no Yaiba Mugen Train, and Ne Zha 2 were the only five adult animated films on the chart.

The top-grossing animated film of the year has usually been an American film, with a few exceptions. Japanese animated features have topped the list at seven occasions: in 1978, 1979, 1980, 1983, 1984, 1987, and 2020; the list has also been topped by a German film in 1926, Spanish in 1945, French in 1949, British in 1954, Swedish in 1968 and 1974, Norwegian in 1975, Belgian in 1976, Canadian in 1985, and Chinese in 2025.

Year	Title	Worldwide gross	Budget	Ref
1926	The Adventures of Prince Achmed	$100,156^{IT}	—N/a	
1928–36	—N/a	—N/a	—N/a	—N/a
1937	Snow White and the Seven Dwarfs	$418,200,000+ ($8,500,000)^{R}	$1,488,423	(Note: Snow White and the Seven Dwarfs: Monaco, Paul (2010). A History of American Movies: A Film-By-Film Look at the Art, Craft, and Business of Cinema. Scarecrow Press. p. 54. ISBN 978-0-8108-7434-3. Archived from the original on 2023-04-10. "Considered a highly risky gamble when the movie was in production in the mid-1930s, by the fiftieth anniversary of its 1937 premiere Snow White's earnings exceeded $330 million"; Wilhelm, Henry Gilmer; Brower, Carol (1993). The Permanence and Care of Color Photographs: Traditional and Digital Color Prints, Color Negatives, Slides, and Motion Pictures. Preservation Pub. p. 359. ISBN 978-0-911515-00-8. "In only 2 months after the 1987 re-release, the film grossed another $45 million—giving it a total gross to date of about $375 million!"; "Snow White and the Seven Dwarfs (1987 Re-issue)". Boxoffice. "North American box-office: $46,594,719"; "Snow White and the Seven Dwarfs (1993 Re-issue)". Boxoffice. Archived from the original on August 19, 2014. "North American box-office: $41,634,791") (Note: Snow White and the Seven Dwarfs and Pinocchio: Block & Wilson 2010; p. 207. "When the budget rose from $250,000 to $1,488,423 he even mortgaged his own home and automobile. Disney had bet more than his company on the success of Snow White." p. 237. "By the end of 1938, it had grossed more than $8 million in worldwide rentals and was ranked at the time as the second-highest-grossing film after the 1925 epic Ben-Hur". p. 255. "On its initial release Pinocchio brought in only $1.6 million in domestic rentals (compared with Snow White's $4.2 million) and $1.9 million in foreign rentals (compared with Snow White's $4.3 million).")
1938	—N/a	—N/a	—N/a	—N/a
1939	Gulliver's Travels	$3,200,000^{*}	$700,000	
1940	Pinocchio	$87,000,862^{*} ($3,500,000)^{R}	$2,600,000	
1941	Dumbo	$1,600,000^{*}	$950,000	(Note: Barrier, 318)
1942	Bambi	$267,447,150 ($3,449,353)^{R}	$858,000	(Note: Block & Wilson 2010, p. 281. "Worldwide rentals of $3,449,353 barely recouped the film's nearly $2 million production cost.") (Note: Block & Wilson 2010, pp. 712–713.: Bambi: "Worldwide Box Office: $266.8; Production Cost: $1.7 (Millions of $s)"; 101 Dalmatians: "Worldwide Box Office: $215.0; Production Cost: $3.6 (Millions of $s)"; The Jungle Book: "Worldwide Box Office: $170.8"; Production Cost: $3.9 (Millions of $s)"; Aladdin: "Worldwide Box Office: $505.1"; Production Cost: $28.0 (Millions of $s)")
1943	Victory Through Air Power	$799,000^{*}	~$789,000	
1944	The Three Caballeros	$3,355,000^{R}	TBD	
1945	The Enchanted Sword	ES€5,595,283^{ES} (~$90,000)	TBD	
1946	Make Mine Music	$3,275,000^{R}	$1,370,000	
1947	Fun and Fancy Free	$3,165,000^{R}	TBD	
1948	Melody Time	$2,560,000^{R}	$1,500,000	
1949	The Adventures of Ichabod and Mr. Toad	$1,625,000^{R}	TBD	
1950	Cinderella	$263,591,415 ($20,000,000/$7,800,000)^{*}^{R}	$2,200,000	
1951	Alice in Wonderland	$2,400,000^{*}	$3,000,000	(Note: 'The Top Box Office Hits of 1951', Variety, January 2, 1952)
1952	The King and the Mockingbird	$167,451	TBD	
1953	Peter Pan	$145,000,000 ($7,000,000)	$4,000,000	
1954	Animal Farm	$350,000	TBD	
1955	Lady and the Tramp	$187,000,000 ($6,500,000)^{*}^{R}	$4,000,000	
1956	TBD	TBD	TBD	TBD
1957	TBD	TBD	TBD	TBD
1958	TBD	TBD	TBD	TBD
1959	Sleeping Beauty	$51,600,000^{*} ($5,300,000)^{R}	$6,000,000	
1960	TBD	TBD	TBD	TBD
1961	One Hundred and One Dalmatians	$303,000,000	$3,600,000	
1962	TBD	TBD	TBD	TBD
1963	The Sword in the Stone	$22,182,353^{*}^{R} ($13,050,777)^{*}^{R}	$3,000,000	(Note: "Big Rental Pictures of 1964", Variety, January 6, 1965 p 39.)
1964	Hey There, It's Yogi Bear	$1,940,903^{*}–2,438,233^{*} ($1,130,000)^{R}	TBD	(Note: "Big Rental Pictures of 1964", Variety, 6 January 1965 p 39.)
1965	TBD	TBD	TBD	TBD
1966	TBD	TBD	TBD	TBD
1967	The Jungle Book	$378,000,000 ($23,800,000)^{R}	$4,000,000	
1968	Out of an Old Man's Head	SEK1,270,971^{SW} (~$245,000)^{H}	TBD	(Note: Press reaction and comment at the Swedish Film Institute (in Swedish))
1969	A Boy Named Charlie Brown	$12,000,000^{*}	$1,100,000	
1970	The Aristocats	$191,000,000 ($26,462,000)^{R}	$4,000,000	
1971	Daisy Town	SEK1,202,319^{SW} (~$253,000)	TBD	
1972	Fritz the Cat	$90,000,000	$850,000	
1973	Robin Hood	$32,056,467^{*} ($27,500,000)^{R}	$5,000,000	
1974	Dunderklumpen!	SEK5,813,000^{SW} (~$2,675,205)^{H}	TBD	
1975	The Pinchcliffe Grand Prix	$6,439,069^{NW}^{SW}	TBD	
1976	The Smurfs and the Magic Flute	$19,000,000	TBD	
1977	The Rescuers	$169,000,000 ($29,000,000)^{*}	$7,500,000	
1978	Farewell to Space Battleship Yamato	¥4,300,000,000^{JP} ($43,000,000)	$1,711,000	
1979	Galaxy Express 999	¥1,650,000,000^{JP} ($7,610,000)^{R}	TBD	
1980	Doraemon: Nobita's Dinosaur	¥2,640,000,000^{JP} ($11,643,000)	TBD	
1981	The Fox and the Hound	$63,456,988^{*} ($39,900,000)^{*}	$12,000,000	
1982	The Secret of NIMH	$14,665,733^{*}	$7,000,000	
1983	Harmagedon: Genma Wars	¥1,800,000,000^{JP} ($7,600,000)	TBD	
1984	Doraemon: Nobita's Great Adventure into the Underworld	¥2,640,000,000^{JP} ($11,800,000)	TBD	
1985	The Care Bears Movie	$34,000,000 ($22,934,622)^{*}	$2,000,000	(Note: Sources differ as to the actual cost of The Care Bears Movie.: US$2 million: Foley (2003), Stewart (2005); US$3 million: Salamon (1985), Daniell (1985), Stoffman (2002); US$3.5 million: Adilman (1987), Lerch (1988); US$4 million: Harmetz (1985), Canby (1986), Walmsley (1985), Engelhardt (1986), Solomon (1986), Beck (2005); US$4.5 million: Thomas (1986))
1986	An American Tail	$84,542,002	$9,000,000	
1987	Doraemon: Nobita and the Knights on Dinosaurs	¥2,550,000,000^{JP} ($17,630,000)	TBD	
1988	Oliver & Company	$121,000,000+ ($100,000,000)+	$31,000,000	
1989	The Little Mermaid	$233,000,000 ($84,355,863)^{*}	$40,000,000	(Note: Stewart, James B. (2005). DisneyWar, p. 104. ISBN 0-684-80993-1. Simon & Schuster. Retrieved August 4, 2014.)
1990	The Rescuers Down Under	$47,431,461	TBD	
1991	Beauty and the Beast	$438,656,843 ($351,863,363)	$25,000,000	
1992	Aladdin	$504,050,219	$28,000,000	
1993	The Nightmare Before Christmas	$107,522,116 ($50,003,043)^{*}	$18,000,000	
1994	The Lion King	$970,707,763 ($763,455,561)	$45,000,000	
1995	Toy Story	$401,157,969 ($361,958,736)	$30,000,000	(Note: Toy Story: "Toy Story (1995)". Box Office Mojo. Archived from the original on August 15, 2010.; "Toy Story (3D)". Box Office Mojo. Archived from the original on November 29, 2014.)
1996	The Hunchback of Notre Dame	$325,338,851	$70,000,000	
1997	Hercules	$252,712,101	$85,000,000	
1998	A Bug's Life	$363,258,859	$120,000,000	
1999	Toy Story 2	$511,358,276 ($485,015,179)	$90,000,000	(Note: Toy Story 2: "Toy Story 2 (1999)". Box Office Mojo. Archived from the original on September 1, 2012.; "Toy Story 2 3D (2009)". Box Office Mojo. Archived from the original on January 28, 2012.)
2000	Dinosaur	$349,822,765	$127,500,000	
2001	Monsters, Inc.	$579,770,299 ($525,373,250)	$115,000,000	
2002	Ice Age	$383,257,136	$59,000,000	
2003	Finding Nemo	$941,637,960 ($867,893,978)	$94,000,000	
2004	Shrek 2	$933,848,612	$150,000,000	
2005	Madagascar	$543,289,400 ($542,063,846)	$75,000,000	
2006	Ice Age: The Meltdown	$667,094,506 ($660,998,756)	$80,000,000	
2007	Shrek the Third	$813,367,380	$160,000,000	
2008	Kung Fu Panda	$631,744,560	$130,000,000	
2009	Ice Age: Dawn of the Dinosaurs	$886,686,817	$90,000,000	
2010	Toy Story 3	$1,068,879,522	$200,000,000	
2011	Kung Fu Panda 2	$665,692,281	$150,000,000	
2012	Ice Age: Continental Drift	$877,244,782	$95,000,000	
2013	Frozen (Note: Box Office Mojo stopped updating its main total for Frozen in August 2014, while it was still in release. The total listed here incorporates subsequent earnings in Japan, Nigeria, Spain, the United Kingdom and Germany up to the end of 2015, but omits earnings in Turkey, Iceland, Brazil, and Australia (2016) which amount to a few hundred thousand dollars. The total is rounded to $1 million to compensate for the numerical inaccuracy.)	$1,290,000,000 ($1,287,000,000)	$150,000,000	
2014	Big Hero 6	$657,827,828	$165,000,000	
2015	Minions	$1,159,457,503	$74,000,000	
2016	Finding Dory	$1,029,266,989	$200,000,000	
2017	Despicable Me 3	$1,034,800,131	$80,000,000	
2018	Incredibles 2	$1,242,805,359	$200,000,000	
2019	The Lion King	$1,662,020,819	$260,000,000	
2020	Demon Slayer: Kimetsu no Yaiba Mugen Train	$512,704,063	$15,765,750	
2021	Sing 2	$408,897,474	$85,000,000	
2022	Minions: The Rise of Gru	$940,482,695	$80,000,000–100,000,000	
2023	The Super Mario Bros. Movie	$1,360,783,214	$100,000,000	
2024	Inside Out 2	$1,698,863,816	$200,000,000	
2025	Ne Zha 2	$2,217,758,382	$80,000,000	
2026	Toy Story 5	$1,149,545,392	$250,000,000	

- ( ... ) Since grosses are not limited to original theatrical runs, a film's first-run gross is included in brackets after the total if known.
- ^{*}U.S. and Canada gross only
- ^{IT}Italy only
- ^{ES}Spanish only
- ^{SW}Swedish gross only
- ^{NW}Norwegian gross only
- ^{JP}Japanese gross only
- ^{R}Distributor rental
- ^{TBD}To be determined
- ^{N/A}Not applicable; no animated feature length film was released in that year.
- ^{H}Films contain animated/live-action scenes.

== Timeline of highest-grossing animated films ==
At least 10 animated films have held the record of highest-grossing animated film at different times. Four of these were Disney films and three more by Pixar, alongside three more by other studios. All of these films are American with the exception of Ne Zha 2, which was produced in China.

Snow White held the record for the longest, with 55 years, while Inside Out 2 held it for the shortest period of 5 months. The original 1994 version of The Lion King was the most recent non-computer-animated film to hold the record. Shrek 2, Toy Story 3, Inside Out 2, and Ne Zha 2 are the four sequels to hold the record. The 2019 version of The Lion King is the only animated remake to hold this record. Finding Nemo was the first computer-animated film to hold this record.

All of these films are still among the highest-grossing animated films except Snow White, and only Snow White, Aladdin and Shrek 2 are not also among the highest-grossing films. The Lion King is the only franchise to hold the record twice. Ne Zha 2 is the first non-American animated film, as well as the first adult animated film, to hold this record.

The first three films on this list utilize hand-drawn animation, while the remaining seven are computer-animated.

Title	Established	Record-setting gross	Ref
Snow White and the Seven Dwarfs (Note: Snow White earned $8.5 million in gross rental upon its initial release, in the process becoming the highest-grossing sound film. The gross rental is the distributor's share of the box-office gross and was more commonly reported than the exhibition gross up to the 1970s.)	1938	$8,500,000	
Snow White and the Seven Dwarfs	1993	$418,200,000	
Aladdin (Note: It is possible Aladdin never took the record. Aladdin's release (1992–93) coincided with a Snow White reissue, and it is possible that Snow White ended up grossing more. Snow White had grossed a total of $330 million up to 1987, and then added a further $88 million in North America from its 1987 and 1993 reissues; it is unknown how much Snow White made from these reissues outside of North America, but if the foreign gross matched or exceeded the North American gross then Snow White would have earned more.)	1993	$504,050,219	
The Lion King	1994	$768,000,000	
The Lion King	2002	$783,841,776	
Finding Nemo	2003	$867,893,978	
Shrek 2	2004	$928,760,770	
Toy Story 3	2010	$1,068,879,522	
Frozen	2014	$1,287,000,000	
Frozen	2017	$1,290,000,000	
The Lion King	2019	$1,662,020,819	
Inside Out 2	2024	$1,698,863,816	
Ne Zha 2	2025	$2,217,758,382	

=== Computer animation ===
The following is a timeline of highest-grossing computer-animated films.

Toy Story is the only franchise to hold the record on multiple occasions doing so with the first three films. Pixar is the only studio to hold the record on multiple occasions doing so seven times, while A Bug's Life, Finding Nemo and Inside Out 2 held the record the shortest for five months. Shrek 2, made by DreamWorks Animation, and Ne Zha 2, made by Beijing Enlight Media, are the only two films on the list not produced by Disney or Pixar.

Title	Established	Record-setting gross	Ref
Toy Story	1995	$361,958,736	
A Bug's Life	1998	$363,258,859	
Toy Story 2	1999	$485,015,179	
Monsters, Inc.	2001	$525,373,250	
Finding Nemo	2003	$867,893,978	
Shrek 2	2004	$928,760,770	
Toy Story 3	2010	$1,068,879,522	
Frozen	2014	$1,287,000,000	
Frozen	2017	$1,290,000,000	
The Lion King	2019	$1,662,020,819	
Inside Out 2	2024	$1,698,863,816	
Ne Zha 2	2025	$2,217,758,382	

=== Stop motion ===
At least three stop motion animated films have held the record of highest-grossing animated film at different times. Chicken Run currently holds the record for the longest, with 25 years, while The Nightmare Before Christmas held it for the shortest period of seven years.

These films are still among the highest-grossing stop-motion animated films.

Title	Established	Record-setting gross	Ref
The Pinchcliffe Grand Prix	1975	$6,439,069	
The Nightmare Before Christmas	1993	$50,003,043	
The Nightmare Before Christmas	1994	$58,019,461	
Chicken Run	2000	$227,793,915	

== Highest-grossing animated franchises and film series ==
The following chart is a list of the highest-grossing animated film franchises. The top three are among the highest-grossing film franchises of all time and, respectively, are between 13th and 19th of all time. Pixar is the most represented studio with five franchises on this list. Despicable Me is the highest-grossing animated franchise of all time with nearly $6.2 billion; it is also one of five animated franchises (Toy Story, Frozen, Zootopia, and Super Mario) with at least two films grossing over $1 billion worldwide. Frozen, Zootopia, and Super Mario are the only animated franchises where every installment grossed $1 billion, and along with Inside Out and the Fengshen Cinematic Universe, are the only animated franchises to average over $1 billion per film; Zootopia has the highest per-film average, with nearly $1.45 billion unadjusted.

Highest-grossing animated franchises and film series^{[§]}(The films in each franchise can be viewed by selecting "show")

Rank	Series	Total worldwide box office	No. of films	Average of films	Highest-grossing film

1
Despicable Me
$6,172,060,722
7
$881,722,960
Minions ($1,159,457,503)

	Main series	$3,541,430,684	4	$885,357,671	Despicable Me 3 ($1,034,800,131)
1	Despicable Me 3 (2017)	$1,034,800,131			
2	Despicable Me 4 (2024)	$986,706,425			
3	Despicable Me 2 (2013)	$975,216,835			
4	Despicable Me (2010)	$544,707,293			

	Minions series	$2,630,630,038	3	$876,876,679	Minions ($1,159,457,503)
1	Minions (2015)	$1,159,457,503			
2	The Rise of Gru (2022)	$940,482,695			
3	Minions & Monsters (2026)	$530,689,840			

2
Toy Story
$4,431,207,973
6
$738,534,662
Toy Story 5 ($1,149,545,392)

	Main series	$4,204,782,553	5	$840,956,511	Toy Story 5 ($1,149,545,392)
1	Toy Story 5 (2026)	$1,149,545,392			
2	Toy Story 4 (2019)	$1,073,841,394			
3	Toy Story 3 (2010)	$1,068,879,522			
4	Toy Story 2 (1999)	$511,358,276			
5	Toy Story (1995)	$401,157,969			

Lightyear (2022)	$226,425,420

3
Shrek
$4,032,155,345
6
$672,025,891
Shrek 2 ($932,542,741)

	Main series	$2,992,838,731	4	$748,209,683	Shrek 2 ($932,542,741)
1	Shrek 2 (2004)	$932,542,741			
2	Shrek the Third (2007)	$813,367,380			
3	Shrek Forever After (2010)	$752,600,867			
4	Shrek (2001)	$494,327,743			

	Puss in Boots series	$1,039,316,614	2	$519,658,307	Puss in Boots ($554,987,477)
1	Puss in Boots (2011)	$554,987,477			
2	The Last Wish (2022)	$484,329,137			

4
The Lion King
$3,355,361,803
4
$838,840,451
The Lion King (2019) ($1,662,020,819)

	CGI animated series	$2,384,652,575	2	$1,192,326,288	The Lion King (2019) ($1,662,020,819)
1	The Lion King (2019)	$1,662,020,819			
2	Mufasa (2024)	$722,631,756			

	Traditionally animated series	$970,709,228	2	$485,354,614	The Lion King (1994) ($970,707,763)
1	The Lion King (1994)	$970,707,763			
2	The Lion King 1½ (2004)	$1,465			

5	Ice Age	$3,222,862,279	5	$644,572,456	Dawn of the Dinosaurs ($886,686,817)
1	Dawn of the Dinosaurs (2009)	$886,686,817			
2	Continental Drift (2012)	$877,244,782			
3	The Meltdown (2006)	$667,094,506			
4	Collision Course (2016)	$408,579,038			
5	Ice Age (2002)	$383,257,136			

6
Fengshen Cinematic Universe
$3,204,115,556
3
$1,068,038,519
Ne Zha 2 ($2,217,758,382)

	Ne Zha series	$2,960,272,451	2	$1,480,136,226	Ne Zha 2 ($2,217,758,382)
1	Ne Zha 2 (2025)	$2,217,758,382			
2	Ne Zha (2019)	$742,514,069			

Jiang Ziya: Legend of Deification (2020)	$243,843,105

7	Zootopia	$2,894,093,486	2	$1,447,046,743	Zootopia 2 ($1,870,309,291)
1	Zootopia 2 (2025)	$1,870,309,291			
2	Zootopia (2016)	$1,023,784,195			

8	Frozen	$2,740,026,933	2	$1,370,013,467	Frozen 2 ($1,450,026,933)
1	Frozen 2 (2019)	$1,450,026,933			
2	Frozen (2013)	$1,290,000,000			

9	Inside Out	$2,557,940,070	2	$1,278,970,035	Inside Out 2 ($1,698,863,816)
1	Inside Out 2 (2024)	$1,698,863,816			
2	Inside Out (2015)	$859,076,254			

10	Super Mario	$2,374,069,514	2	$1,187,034,757	The Super Mario Bros. Movie ($1,360,783,214)
1	The Super Mario Bros. Movie (2023)	$1,360,783,214			
2	The Super Mario Galaxy Movie (2026)	$1,013,286,300			

11	Kung Fu Panda	$2,366,297,158	4	$591,574,290	Kung Fu Panda 2 ($665,692,281)
1	Kung Fu Panda 2 (2011)	$665,692,281			
2	Kung Fu Panda (2008)	$631,744,560			
3	Kung Fu Panda 4 (2024)	$547,689,492			
4	Kung Fu Panda 3 (2016)	$521,170,825			

12
Madagascar
$2,266,510,065
4
$566,627,516
Europe's Most Wanted ($746,921,274)

	Main series	$1,894,111,028	3	$631,370,343	Europe's Most Wanted ($746,921,274)
1	Europe's Most Wanted (2012)	$746,921,274			
2	Escape 2 Africa (2008)	$603,900,354			
3	Madagascar (2005)	$543,289,400			

Penguins of Madagascar (2014)	$373,015,621

13	Finding Nemo	$1,970,904,949	2	$985,452,475	Finding Dory ($1,029,266,989)
1	Finding Dory (2016)	$1,029,266,989			
2	Finding Nemo (2003)	$941,637,960			

14	Doraemon	$1,922,521,812	47	$40,904,719	Stand by Me Doraemon ($183,442,714)
/ New Generation / $827,212,770 / 20 / $41,360,639 / Nobita's Treasure Island ($81,481,186); 1 / Nobita's Treasure Island (2018) / $81,481,186; 2 / Nobita's Chronicle of the Moon Exploration (2019) / $65,406,606; 3 / Great Adventure in the Antarctic Kachi Kochi (2017) / $61,060,700; 4 / Nobita and the Birth of Japan 2016 (2016) / $50,939,840; 5 / Nobita's Earth Symphony (2024) / $46,704,773; 6 / Nobita and the Island of Miracles (2012) / $46,180,706; 7 / Nobita's Sky Utopia (2023) / $45,525,160; 8 / Nobita's New Dinosaur (2020) / $43,035,655; 9 / Nobita's Secret Gadget Museum (2013) / $42,770,271; 10 / Nobita's Art World Tales (2025) / $39,693,669; 11 / New Nobita's Great Demon-Peko and the Exploration Party of Five (2014) / $35,861,856; 12 / Nobita's Space Heroes (2015) / $34,811,747; 13 / Nobita's Great Battle of the Mermaid King (2010) / $34,701,783; 14 / Nobita's New Great Adventure into the Underworld (2007) / $32,787,846; 15 / Nobita and the Green Giant Legend (2008) / $31,393,786; 16 / Nobita's Dinosaur 2006 (2006) / $30,963,292; 17 / Nobita and the New Steel Troops-Winged Angels (2011) / $29,260,430; 18 / New Nobita and the Castle of the Undersea Devil (2026) / $27,167,194; 19 / The Record of Nobita's Spaceblazer (2009) / $25,422,212; 20 / Nobita's Little Star Wars 2021 (2022) / $22,044,058
/ Original series / $495,825,792 / 25 / $19,833,032 / Nobita's the Legend of the Sun King ($28,300,000); 1 / Nobita's the Legend of the Sun King (2000) / $28,300,000; 2 / Nobita and the Spiral City (1997) / $28,000,000; 3 / Nobita's Great Adventure in the South Seas (1998) / $28,000,000; 4 / Nobita Drifts in the Universe (1999) / $27,700,000; 5 / Nobita in the Robot Kingdom (2002) / $16,076,303; 6 / Nobita in the Wan-Nyan Spacetime Odyssey (2004) / $26,663,978; 7 / Nobita and the Birth of Japan (1989) / $26,600,000; 8 / Nobita and the Galaxy Super-express (1996) / $25,700,000; 9 / Nobita and the Winged Braves (2001) / $25,100,000; 10 / Nobita and the Tin Labyrinth (1993) / $24,100,000; 11 / Nobita's Diary of the Creation of the World (1995) / $23,200,000; 12 / Nobita's Dorabian Nights (1991) / $22,500,000; 13 / Nobita's Three Visionary Swordsmen (1994) / $21,900,000; 14 / Nobita and the Kingdom of Clouds (1992) / $21,700,000; 15 / Nobita and the Animal Planet (1990) / $21,500,000; 16 / Nobita and the Windmasters (2003) / $20,455,511; 17 / The Record of Nobita's Parallel Visit to the West (1988) / $18,200,000; 18 / Nobita and the Knights on Dinosaurs (1987) / $16,600,000; 19 / The Records of Nobita, Spaceblazer (1981) / $14,300,000; 20 / Nobita and the Steel Troops (1986) / $12,500,000; 21 / Nobita's Great Adventure into the Underworld (1984) / $12,500,000; 22 / Nobita's Dinosaur (1980) / $10,600,000; 23 / Nobita and the Haunts of Evil (1982) / $8,640,000; 24 / Nobita's Little Star Wars (1985) / $7,820,000; 25 / Nobita and the Castle of the Undersea Devil (1983) / $7,170,000
/ Stand by Me Doraemon series / $248,644,088 / 2 / $124,322,044 / Stand by Me Doraemon ($183,442,714); 1 / Stand by Me Doraemon (2014) / $183,442,714; 2 / Stand by Me Doraemon 2 (2020) / $65,201,374

15	The Incredibles	$1,874,493,857	2	$937,246,929	Incredibles 2 ($1,242,805,359)
1	Incredibles 2 (2018)	$1,242,805,359			
2	The Incredibles (2004)	$631,688,498			

16
Cars
$1,825,885,245
5
$365,177,049
Cars 2 ($559,853,036)

	Main series	$1,429,313,818	3	$476,437,939	Cars 2 ($559,853,036)
1	Cars 2 (2011)	$559,853,036			
2	Cars (2006)	$485,530,126			
3	Cars 3 (2017)	$383,930,656			

	Planes series	$396,571,427	2	$198,285,714	Planes ($240,171,783)
1	Planes (2013)	$240,171,783			
2	Fire & Rescue (2014)	$156,399,644			

17	Moana	$1,702,601,944	2	$851,300,972	Moana 2 ($1,059,269,477)
1	Moana 2 (2024)	$1,059,269,477			
2	Moana (2016)	$643,332,467			

18
Detective Conan
$1,656,718,829
30
$55,223,961
One-eyed Flashback ($166,061,012)

	Main series	$1,620,170,752	29	$55,867,957	One-eyed Flashback ($166,061,012)
1	One-eyed Flashback (2025)	$166,061,012			
2	The Million-dollar Pentagram (2024)	$150,008,115			
3	The Fist of Blue Sapphire (2019)	$123,009,017			
4	Black Iron Submarine (2023)	$121,879,597			
5	Zero the Enforcer (2018)	$107,918,046			
6	The Bride of Halloween (2022)	$102,599,093			
7	The Scarlet Bullet (2021)	$102,541,282			
8	Fallen Angel of the Highway (2026)	$80,140,895			
9	The Darkest Nightmare (2016)	$66,910,978			
10	Crimson Love Letter (2017)	$63,144,805			
11	The Eleventh Striker (2012)	$44,369,456			
12	Quarter of Silence (2011)	$42,808,578			
13	Dimensional Sniper (2014)	$42,028,116			
14	Sunflowers of Inferno (2015)	$40,417,504			
15	The Raven Chaser (2009)	$39,664,359			
16	The Lost Ship in the Sky (2010)	$36,407,407			
17	Private Eye in the Distant Sea (2013)	$36,324,232			
18	The Private Eyes' Requiem (2006)	$26,251,232			
19	Crossroad in the Ancient Capital (2003)	$24,342,320			
20	Captured in Her Eyes (2000)	$23,800,000			
21	The Phantom of Baker Street (2002)	$23,783,234			
22	Full Score of Fear (2008)	$23,760,176			
23	Countdown to Heaven (2001)	$23,700,000			
24	Magician of the Silver Sky (2004)	$22,618,511			
25	Jolly Roger in the Deep Azure (2007)	$22,118,835			
26	The Last Wizard of the Century (1999)	$22,000,000			
27	Strategy Above the Depths (2005)	$18,723,952			
28	The Fourteenth Target (1998)	$14,100,000			
29	The Time Bombed Skyscraper (1997)	$8,740,000			

Lupin the 3rd vs. Detective Conan: The Movie (2013)	$41,397,727

19	How to Train Your Dragon	$1,640,996,870	3	$546,998,957	How to Train Your Dragon 2 ($621,537,519)
1	How to Train Your Dragon 2 (2014)	$621,537,519			
2	The Hidden World (2019)	$524,580,592			
3	How to Train Your Dragon (2010)	$494,878,759			

20	Boonie Bears	$1,431,895,042	12	$119,324,587	Time Twist ($277,106,954)
1	Time Twist (2024)	$277,106,954			
2	Guardian Code (2023)	$221,300,000			
3	The Hidden Protector (2026)	$154,000,000			
4	Back to Earth (2022)	$152,000,000			
5	Blast into the Past (2019)	$112,369,259			
6	Future Reborn (2025)	$110,700,000			
7	The Wild Life (2021)	$97,225,611			
8	The Big Shrink (2018)	$96,788,929			
9	Entangled Worlds (2017)	$77,151,096			
10	A Mystical Winter (2015)	$47,581,416			
11	The Big Top Secret (2016)	$45,150,390			
12	To the Rescue (2014)	$40,521,387			

== See also ==
- List of animated films by box office admissions
- List of highest-grossing adult animated films
- List of highest-grossing live-action/animated films
- List of highest-grossing Japanese films
- List of highest-grossing openings for animated films
- List of most expensive animated films

=== Per decade ===
- List of highest-grossing animated films of the 1980s
- List of highest-grossing animated films of the 1990s
- List of highest-grossing animated films of the 2000s
- List of highest-grossing animated films of the 2010s
- List of highest-grossing animated films of the 2020s
