= List of highest-grossing animated films of the 2020s =

The following are lists of the highest-grossing animated feature films first released in the 2020s.

== Highest-grossing animated films of the 2020s ==
Figures are given in U.S. dollars (USD).

Top 50
Rank	Title	Country	Distributor	Worldwide gross	Year	Ref
1	Ne Zha 2	China	Beijing Enlight Pictures	$2,228,420,000	2025	
2	Zootopia 2	U.S.	Walt Disney Studios Motion Pictures	$1,870,309,291	2025	
3	Inside Out 2	U.S.	Walt Disney Studios Motion Pictures	$1,698,641,117	2024	
4	The Super Mario Bros. Movie	U.S.	Universal Pictures	$1,361,992,475	2023	
5	Toy Story 5	U.S.	Walt Disney Studios Motion Pictures	$1,149,137,473	2026	
6	Moana 2	U.S.	Walt Disney Studios Motion Pictures	$1,059,719,509	2024	
7	The Super Mario Galaxy Movie	U.S.	Universal Pictures	$1,011,340,658	2026	
8	Despicable Me 4	U.S.	Universal Pictures	$972,021,410	2024	
9	Minions: The Rise of Gru	U.S.	Universal Pictures	$940,203,765	2022	
10	Demon Slayer: Kimetsu no Yaiba – The Movie: Infinity Castle	Japan	Toho/Aniplex	$800,413,549	2025	
11	Mufasa: The Lion King	U.S.	Walt Disney Studios Motion Pictures	$721,705,135	2024	
12	Spider-Man: Across the Spider-Verse	U.S.	Sony Pictures Releasing	$690,897,910	2023	
13	Kung Fu Panda 4	U.S.	Universal Pictures	$549,205,628	2024	
14	Minions & Monsters	U.S.	Universal Pictures	$530,319,698	2026	
15	Demon Slayer: Kimetsu no Yaiba – The Movie: Mugen Train	Japan	Toho/Aniplex	$512,704,063	2020	
16	Elemental	U.S.	Walt Disney Studios Motion Pictures	$496,444,308	2023	
17	Puss in Boots: The Last Wish	U.S.	Universal Pictures	$484,329,137	2022	
18	Sing 2	U.S.	Universal Pictures	$421,285,349	2021	
19	Hoppers	U.S.	Walt Disney Studios Motion Pictures	$389,099,231	2026	
20	The Wild Robot	U.S.	Universal Pictures	$334,537,187	2024	
21	Suzume	Japan	Toho	$324,432,115	2022	
22	All Wishes Come True!	China	Maoyan	$307,784,556	2026	
23	The Boy and the Heron	Japan	Toho	$304,800,000	2023	
24	Migration	U.S.	Universal Pictures	$298,695,400	2023	
25	The First Slam Dunk	Japan	Toei Company	$278,965,560	2022	
26	Boonie Bears: Time Twist	China	Fantawild	$275,866,316	2024	
27	Encanto	U.S.	Walt Disney Studios Motion Pictures	$256,786,742	2021	
28	The Garfield Movie	U.S.	Sony Pictures Releasing	$255,336,328	2024	
29	Wish	U.S.	Walt Disney Studios Motion Pictures	$254,997,360	2023	
30	The Bad Guys	U.S.	Universal Pictures	$250,901,649	2022	
31	One Piece Film: Red	Japan	Toei Company	$246,570,000	2020	
32	Jiang Ziya: Legend Of Deification	China	Beijing Enlight Pictures	$243,883,429	2020	
33	Chang'an	China	Tianjin Maoyan Weiying Culture Media	$241,270,000	2023	
34	The Bad Guys 2	U.S.	Universal Pictures	$239,081,933	2025	
35	Nobody	China	Shanghai Animation Film Studio	$228,700,000	2025	
36	Lightyear	U.S.	Walt Disney Studios Motion Pictures	$226,425,420	2022	
37	Boonie Bears: Guardian Code	China	Fantawild	$221,982,308	2023	
38	The Croods: A New Age	U.S.	Universal Pictures	$215,905,815	2020	
39	Trolls Band Together	U.S.	Universal Pictures	$209,649,761	2023	
40	DC League of Super-Pets	U.S.	Warner Bros. Pictures	$207,457,117	2022	
41	Paw Patrol: The Mighty Movie	Canada	Paramount Pictures	$202,231,360	2023	
42	Jujutsu Kaisen 0	Japan	Toho	$196,436,179	2021	
43	Goat	U.S.	Sony Pictures	$195,359,397	2026	
44	Chainsaw Man – The Movie: Reze Arc	Japan	Toho	$181,115,803	2025	
45	Teenage Mutant Ninja Turtles: Mutant Mayhem	U.S.	Paramount Pictures	$180,513,586	2023	
46	The SpongeBob Movie: Search for SquarePants	U.S.	Paramount Pictures	$169,269,936	2025	
47	Detective Conan: One-eyed Flashback	Japan	Toho	$166,061,012	2025	
48	Paw Patrol: The Dino Movie †	Canada	Paramount	$163,054,296	2026	
49	Chiikawa the Movie: The Secret of Mermaid Island †	Japan	Toho	$159,000,000	2026	
50	Elio	U.S.	Walt Disney Studios Motion Pictures	$154,291,182	2025	

== Highest-grossing film by year ==
Year	Title	Distributor	Worldwide gross	Budget	Ref(s)
2020	Demon Slayer: Kimetsu no Yaiba – The Movie: Mugen Train	Ufotable	$512,704,063	$15,700,000	
2021	Sing 2	Universal Pictures	$408,398,852	$85,000,000	
2022	Minions: The Rise of Gru	Universal Pictures	$940,203,765	$100,000,000	
2023	The Super Mario Bros. Movie	Universal Pictures	$1,362,015,510	$100,000,000	
2024	Inside Out 2	Disney	$1,698,641,117	$200,000,000	
2025	Ne Zha 2	Beijing Enlight Pictures	$2,217,758,382	$80,000,000	
2026	Toy Story 5	Disney	$1,149,137,473	$250,000,000	

== See also ==
- List of animated feature films of the 2020s
