= Boonie Bears: Homeward Journey =

2013 Chinese animated film

- Written by: Fuyuan Liu
- Directed by: Fuyuan Liu
- Starring: Rick Jay Glen; Justin J. Wheeler; Paul "Maxx" Rinehart; Toni Thompson; Siobhan Lumsden
- Country of origin: China
- Original languages: Mandarin; English

Production
- Producers: Fantawild Animation Inc.; Le Vision Pictures
- Running time: 68 minutes
- Production company: Fantawild Animation Inc.

Original release
- Release: 8 February 2013

Bonnie Bears: Homeward Journey is a 2013 Chinese animated adventure family drama TV film based on the animated television series Boonie Bears. The first film Boonie Bears: To the Rescue was released after the TV film in 2014.

== Plot ==
It was nearly New Year's eve and while the animals in the forest were preparing decorations for the Chinese New Year, Vick also realised that it was almost Chinese New Year when he received a call from his parents. He tried to cut down some old trees for Mr. Li, who is his boss, in order to get enough money, but his plans were foiled by Briar, Bramble, and the other animals again. The animals soon started to feel bad for Vick when they realized that he was trying to get home for the Chinese New Year, and constructed a vehicle made from the broken logging machine made by Vick earlier when he was trying to cut down the old trees. The other animals were all supposed to stay in the forest while the Bears get Vick home with the vehicle as they drive off to reach the train station where they could drop him only to be pursued by a police officer and his fellow police cars, but during it Tiki and Babu secretly snuck onto the vehicle.

Vick woke up when they were nearly at the train station and ran away, as he thought that the bears were trying to send him somewhere away from the forest to prevent him from cutting down trees. As the bears chased Vick, he tried to enter the railway station, but he got thrown out by the guard since he didn’t have money to buy a ticket. Vick successfully snuck into the railway station, but didn't notice that the bears secretly helped him to get in. When the train came, Vick tried to sneak into the luggage car, but was captured by the guards. With no other option, the bears tore off their human clothes and distracted the guards, scaring them off but were then captured and put inside an animal control truck; Vick quickly snuck in to save them. Peaking through a tiny gap in the doors, Vick discovered that the bears were about to be sent to a testing facility; he saved the bears just as the train departed. Luckily, the bears successfully got Vick onto the luggage cabin in the train using a handcar, And Vick finally got home for Chinese New Year.

== Reception ==
The film was shown at the Italian Contemporary Film Festival.

The film received reviews from sources including The Dove Foundation and Common Sense Media.
