= Fantastica =

Fantastica can refer to:

- Fantastica (1980 film), a 1980 Canadian film
- Fantastica (2018 film), a 2018 Philippine film
- Fantastica: A Boonie Bears Adventure, the title of the 2019 English release of the 2017 Chinese film
