= Chutti =

Chutti may refer to:

- Chutti TV, Indian television station
- Chutti Chathan, 2010 Indian Tamil-language 3D film written and directed by Jijo
