= Le Vision Pictures =

Chinese film production company

Le Vision Pictures 乐视影业
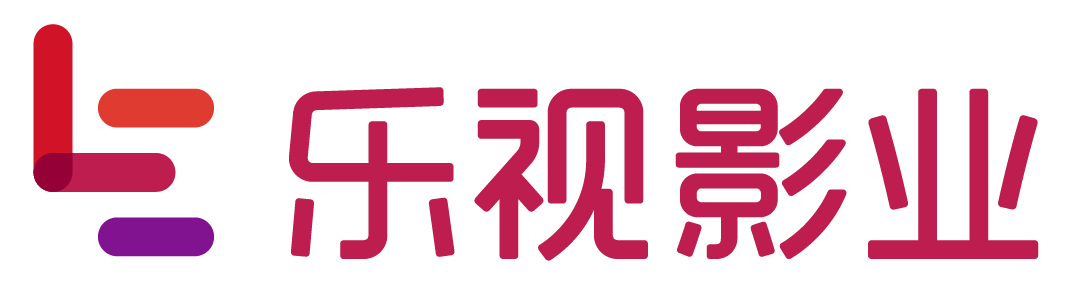
- Type: Private
- Industry: Film Production, Entertainment
- Founded: 2011
- Founder: Zhang Zhao
- Headquarters: Beijing, China
- Number of locations: 4
- Area served: China
- Key people: Zhang Zhao (Chairman & CEO)
- Products: Movies, Television Shows, Web Series
- Net income: ▲CN¥128.2 million (2015)
- Total equity: CN¥2.109 billion (2015)
- Owner: LeEco (28.38%); Sunac China (15%); others (56.62%)
- Footnotes financial data unaudited

Le Vision Pictures is a Chinese film production and distribution company that was founded in 2011 as a subsidiary of LeEco, a Chinese conglomerate established by Jia Yueting. In 2018, the company was acquired by the Chinese property group Sunac and renamed Suniverse Film Entertainment. Its operations encompass film production, publicity, distribution, copyright management, and business development. In 2019, Suniverse Film Entertainment was integrated into the Sunac Culture Group, focusing on family entertainment content. The company has produced and/or distributed films such as The Expendables franchise, The Bullet Vanishes, and Tiny Times. Additionally, it holds the copyrights to several Chinese TV drama series, including Empresses in the Palace, Legend of Mi Yue, and Red Sorghum.

== History ==
In 2011, Zhang Zhao (Chinese: 张昭; pinyin: Zhāng Zhāo), the former president of Enlight Pictures, founded Le Vision Pictures, and is chairman and CEO. Zhang Yimou joined the firm as a contracted movie and creative director in May 2013.

In March 2014, director Lu Chuan joined the company. In its first two years, Le Vision introduced its "O2O Marketing System" business model.

By 2014, the company had become the sixth-largest film distributor in China, holding 4.1% of the market share.

LeEco announced that Le Vision Pictures would be sold to sister company Le.com on 5 December 2015, subject to the approval of the shareholders of the listed company. As of 8 November 2016, the deal had not been completed. In January 2017, the Chinese property group Sunac China acquired a 15% stake in Le Vision Pictures from LeEco.

== Films ==
Le Vision produced and distributed six films in 2012. The Bullet Vanishes was nominated for four Golden Horse Awards (Taiwan), including "Best Picture", and thirteen Hong Kong Film Awards. The Expendables 2, in which Le Vision co-invested and co-distributed in China, grossed over $57 million in China, accounting for 18.5% of global box office revenue.

In 2013, Le Vision released nine films which included Love Will Tear Us Apart, Tiny Times, and Tiny Times 2. Tiny Times earned $78.9 million at the box office that summer.

Boonie Bears: To the Rescue became the highest-grossing domestic animated film at the time of its release. The Cannes Film Festival programmers included Zhang Yimou's Coming Home in the 'OUT OF COMPETITION' section.

== Productions ==
- All's Well, End's Well (2012)
- Fairy Tale Killer
- The Bullet Vanishes
- The Expendables 2
- Conspirators
- Tiny Times franchise
- Hello Babies
- Boonie Bears: To the Rescue! (3D Animation)
- Coming Home
- The Crossing Part I
- The Expendables 3
- Boonie Bears: Mystical Winter (3D Animation)
- You Are My Sunshine (He Yi Sheng Xiao Mo)
- Candle in the Tomb (Gui Chui Deng)
- The Crossing Part II
- Office (Hua Li Shang Ban Zu)
- Boonie Bears III
- Mr. High Heels
- Bounty Hunters
- Time Raiders
- L.O.R.D: Legend of Ravaging Dynasties
- Suddenly Seventeen
- The Great Wall: co-produced with Legendary Pictures, Legendary East , Atlas Entertainment, China Film Group, Dentsu Inc. and Fuji Television Network, Inc.
- GG Bond: Guarding
- Boonie Bears: Entangled Worlds
