= Boonie Bears: The Big Top Secret =

2016 Chinese animated film

- Theatrical release poster
- Directed by: Ding Liang; Lin Yongchang
- Based on: Boonie Bears
- Music by: Qin Zao; Li Zhiping
- Production companies: Shenzhen Huaqiang Shuzi Dongman; You Yang (Tian Jin) Dong Man Culture Media; Le Vision Pictures (Tianjin); Fantawild Holdings; Pearl River Pictures; Dadi Century Films Distribution (Beijing); Tianjin Maoyan Media
- Distributed by: Le Vision Pictures (Beijing); Shenzhen Huaqiang Shuzi Dongman; Mr. Cartoon Pictures; Pearl River Pictures
- Release date: 16 January 2016
- Running time: 96 minutes
- Language: Mandarin
- Box office: CN¥287.7 million (US$45 million)

Boonie Bears: The Big Top Secret is a 2016 Chinese animated adventure comedy film directed by Ding Liang and Lin Yongchang. The film is the third installment in the Boonie Bears film series based on the animated series of the same name, following the 2015 film Boonie Bears: Mystical Winter. It was released in China on 16 January 2016. It will be followed by Boonie Bears: Entangled Worlds, scheduled for release in 2017.

== Plot ==
Every year before the rainy season, Briar would lead the animals to repair and reinforce the Gouxiongling dam, but the small animals were bored and procrastinated, which made Briar increasingly dissatisfied. One day, a heavy rain suddenly fell and the dam collapsed. Briar left his home in anger, but he was unexpectedly washed away by a mudslide. When he woke up, he found himself in a down-and-out circus. An accidental performance saved the day, so Briar was left behind and became a member of the circus. At the same time, the animals in the forest disappeared mysteriously one after another. Briar performed the circus in his own way. Although he had a conflict with a western lowland gorilla Hugo, and an asian elephant Ellie May, the leader of the animals in the circus, the pleasure of success and becoming a big star made him gradually get used to the new life here, and gradually forget the forest and his friends in the forest. One day, the anxious Bramble finally found Briar and hoped that he would go home with him, but Briar refused. Then the gorilla Hugo resolved the accident of Briar and the small animals' performance, and also let Briar understand the difficulties of the gorilla. But at this time, the secrets behind the circus gradually revealed themselves, and Briar was faced with a dilemma: escape and continue his comfortable life as a star; or face it and become who he is again to fight back. After being accidentally rescued by Logger Vick, he was ready to reflect on himself, and become who he used to be again to fight back.

On the stage of the grand carnival circus, Briar led the animals to stage a victory escape, running towards freedom.

== Cast ==
- Zhang Wei
- Zhang Bingjun
- Tan Xiao

== Reception ==
The film grossed CN¥287.7 million at the Chinese box office.
