= Fantawild Adventure Wuhu =

Chinese theme park

- Location: Wuhu, Anhui Province, China
- Status: Defunct
- Opened: 2007
- Closed: 2020
- Operated by: Fantawild Holdings
- Website: Official website

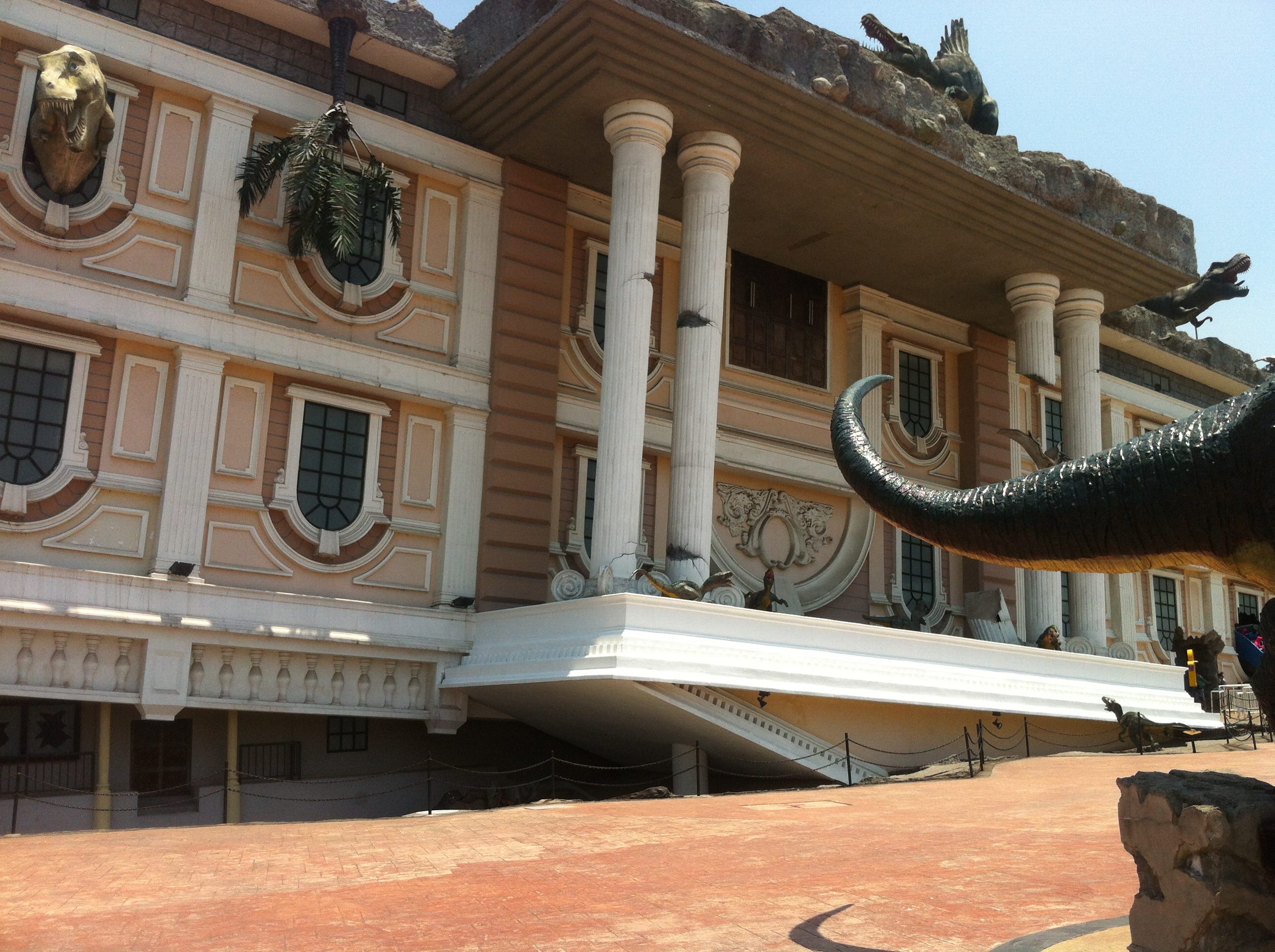
Fantawild Amusement Park

Fantawild Adventure Wuhu (芜湖方特欢乐世界) is a theme park operated by Fantawild (Fangte) in Wuhu, Anhui Province, China. It is the biggest theme park in China with a total area of 125 million square metres. 1.5 billion yuan was invested to build the park.

== Zones ==
The park contains 15 zones:

- Sunshine Plaza (阳光广场)
- Fanta Walk (方特欢乐大道)
- Fisherman’s Wharf (渔人码头)
- Space Journey (太空世界)
- Mystical Valley (神秘河谷)
- Vesuvius (维苏威火山)
- Lost Empire (失落帝国)
- Elf Valley (精灵山谷)
- Wild West (西部传奇)
- Dino-Peninsula (恐龙半岛)
- Conch Bay (海螺湾)
- Duludubi Farm (嘟噜嘟比农庄)
- Kid’s Zone (儿童王国)
- Water Zone (水世界)
- Flare Meteor (火流星)
