= Chutti TV =

Indian TV channel

- Official logo
- Country: India
- Broadcast area: India; Sri Lanka; Malaysia; Singapore
- Network: Sun TV Network
- Headquarters: Chennai, Tamil Nadu, India.

Programming
- Language: Tamil
- Picture format: 576i

Ownership
- Owner: Sun Group
- Sister channels: Kushi TV; Chintu TV; Kochu TV; Sun TV; Gemini TV; Surya TV; Udaya TV

History
- Launched: 29 April 2007

Links
- Website: Official Website

Chutti TV is a 24-hour Tamil cartoon television channel from the Sun TV Network in India. The target audience is children aged between 3 and 17.

== History ==
It was launched on 29 April 2007, making it Sun TV Network's first ever television channel for kids. Initial shows primarily consisted of dubbed versions of popular shows such as Dora the Explorer, Men in Black: The Animated Series, and He-Man and the Masters of the Universe before the channel expanded into creating original animated series and live action shows.

Chutti TV made a partnership with American TV network Nickelodeon until the Tamil audio was added to the Indian channel.

In 2015, the animated series Bommi and Friends was telecast on the channel. That same year, Chutti TV launched a game show called Run Singoo Run on its platform. Run Singoo Run is an interactive game show where participants can control the game using motion capture technology. The Tamil version of the game show was launched on May 30, 2015.

In 2016, the programs Chutti News and Jilinu Oru Summer were hosted by Sinduja.

In 2019, Bommiyum Tirukkuralum hosted by G. Gnanasambandan was telecast.

In 2018, Chutti TV's parent company, Sun TV Network purchased three animated series from the French animation studio Cyber Group Studios for its Tamil kids channel. The three animated series acquired were Tales of Tatonka, G-Fighters, and Animalia.

In 2022, there were false reports that both Chutti TV and the Tamil version of Cartoon Network would stop airing.

In 2023, Jackie Chan Adventures (Tamil: ஜாக்கி சான் சாகசங்கள்) and Dora the Explorer (Tamil: டோராவின் பயணங்கள்) were reaired on the channel.

== List of television series ==
No specified dates

- Lollu
- Nila
- Maanada Mayilada Kids
- Cooking Challenge
- Science Factory
- Tamil Culture
- Little Krishna
- Varupadatha Karadi Sangam
- Bunny Maloney
- Jackie Chanin Sagasangal
- Maha Ganesha
- Little Hakka
- Chutti Raman
- Danger Mouse
- Panchathanthira Kathaigal
- Tiantian

=== Formerly broadcast ===
- Crazy Jessy
- Gloriavin Veedu
- Pei Factory
- Danger School
- Dragon Booster
- World Ahoy
- Avatar
- Super Suji (Bibi Blocksberg)
- Gee Boom Boy
- Cedric
- Greeka Kadhaigal
- All in All Azhagu Raja
- Anna's Tales
- Harry and His Bucket Full of Dinosaurs
- Dragon Tales
- Heidi
- Marsupilami (1993)
- Marsupilami (2000)
- Danny & Daddy
- Bandolero
- Little Sophie
- Bumba
- Sindhubaadhum Arputha Theevum
- Stuart Little
- Vaandu
- Naduvula Konjam Fight Pannuvom
- Max Steel
- SpongeBob SquarePants
- Master Raindrop
- Astro Boy
- Zeke's Pad
- Jumanji
- Godzilla
- Ghostbusters
- Code Lyoko
- W.I.T.C.H.
- Class of the Titans
- Dora the Explorer
- Men in Black: The Series
- He-Man and the Masters of the Universe
- Tales of Tatonka
- G-Fighters
- Animalia
- Bommi and Friends
- Run Singoo Run
- The Jungle Book
- Pocoyo
- Shaktimaan
- Shaka Laka Boom Boom
- The Penguins of Madagascar
- Adventures of the Gummi Bears
- Wolverine and the X-Men
- Teamo Supremo
- Barney & Friends
- Handy Manny
- Little Einsteins
- Paandavum Roosterum
- Famous Five
- 1001 Nights – 1001 Arabian Nights
- Abu the Little Dinosaur
- The Adventures of Hyperman
- The Adventures of Jimmy Neutron, Boy Genius
- Animated Tales of the World
- Adventurers: Masters of Time
- Alex
- Altair in Starland
- Amar Chitra Katha – Chithra Kadhaigal
- Angus & Cheryl
- Animaniacs
- Anne of Green Gables
- Aqua Kids
- Artzooka!
- Atomic Betty – Action Betty
- Ava Riko Teo
- Bumper King Zapper
- Bali
- Barbie Dreamtopia
- BattleClaw
- Beakman's World
- The Beeps
- Timon & Pumbaa
- Bernard
- Bibi & Tina – Super Suji 2
- The Big Guy and Rusty the Boy Robot
- Billy
- Blue's Clues
- Bob Morane
- Bobby and Bill
- Bobby's World
- Bodhi and Friends
- Bonkers
- Brady's Beasts
- Poochi
- Buttercup Wood
- The Buzz on Maggie
- Captain Flamingo
- Casper's Scare School
- Channel Umptee-3
- Chloe's Closet
- Chumballs
- Clifford the Big Red Dog
- The Daltons
- Dark Knights
- Detention
- Dex Hamilton: Alien Entomologist
- Di-Gata Defenders
- The Dick Tracy Show
- Dinky Dog
- Dive Olly Dive!
- Doug
- Dougie in Disguise
- Erky Perky
- Extreme Ghostbusters
- Faireez
- Fairy Tale Police Department
- Fantômette
- Flight Squad
- Flipper and Lopaka
- The Foxbusters
- Frankenstein’s Cat
- Franny’s Feet
- Funky Cops
- Funniest Pets & People
- George of the Jungle
- Geronimo Stilton
- GI Joe: A Real American Hero
- Galaxy Racers
- Hannah Montana
- Harold and the Purple Crayon
- The Harveytoons Show – Casper & Friends
- Hero: 108
- Higglytown Heroes
- Iron Man
- Jack & Marcel
- Jakers! The Adventures of Piggley Winks
- Jim Jam and Sunny
- Mickey Mouse Clubhouse
- Kid Paddle
- Kim Possible
- Kong: The Animated Series
- Kung Fu Panda: Legends of Awesomeness
- Leon
- Lilly the Witch
- Little Bear
- Little Ghosts
- Little Hippo
- The Little Prince
- Little Red Tractor
- Little Vampire
- Lloyd in Space
- Loonatics Unleashed
- Lucky Luke
- Magic Tiger
- Manon
- Martha Speaks
- Maya & Miguel
- Merlin the Magical Puppy
- Mike The Knight
- Mio Mao
- Moby Dick & the Secret of Mu
- Monster Allergy
- My Friend Rabbit
- My Parents are Aliens
- Nanook
- The New Adventures of Hanuman
- The New Adventures of Nanoboy
- The New Lassie – My Friend Lassie
- Noobees
- Nouky & Friends
- Oggy and the Cockroaches
- Ozie Boo!
- Pablo the Little Penguin: The Series
- Patrol 03
- Pearlie
- Peep and the Big Wide World
- Pepper Ann
- Pet Alien
- The Pink Panther Show
- Pinky and the Brain
- The Pinky and Perky Show
- Ralf, the Record Rat
- Rantanplan
- Ratz
- The Real Ghostbusters
- Right on Top
- Ripley’s Believe It or Not!
- The Rocky and Bullwinkle Show
- Ruby Gloom
- SamSam
- Samurai-X
- Scruff
- The Secret World of Benjamin Bear
- She-Ra: Princess of Power
- Shelldon
- Shuriken School
- Sid the Science Kid
- Snorks
- Sonic the Hedgehog
- Space Goofs
- The Spectacular Spider-Man
- Stanley
- Static Shock
- Stunt Dawgs
- Super Buffalo
- Super WHY!
- Talking Tom & Friends
- Teen Titans
- Tiny Toon Adventures
- Titeuf
- Toopy and Binoo
- Tomato Twins
- Tommy & Oscar
- Totally Spies!
- Transformers Academy
- Transformers: Armada
- Transformers: Beast Machines
- Tupu
- Ultimate Book of Spells
- The Weekenders
- What about Mimi?
- The Wiggles Show
- WordWorld
- Worst Best Friends
- X-Calibur
- X-Men: Evolution
- Zorro: Generation Z
- Thenali Raman
- The Garfield Show
- The Grim Adventures of Billy & Mandy
- Super 5

=== Films ===
- Magic Wonderland
- Thalaivar Thimingalam
- The Smurfs
- Boonie Bears: Homeward Journey
- Doctor Strange: The Sorcerer Supreme
- Dragonlance: Dragons of Autumn Twilight
- Gaturro
- The Great Bear
- Here Comes Peter Cottontail
- The Invincible Iron Man
- Jil Jil Genie
- Little Bear: The Movie
- The Littlest Angel
- Next Avengers: Heroes of Tomorrow
- Pinocchio 3000
- Sing to the Dawn
- The Tangerine Bear
- Ultimate Avengers
- Ultimate Avengers 2
- Zorro and Scarlet Whip Revealed
- Zorro: Return to the Future
- Toy Story
- Toy Story 2
- Toy Story 3
- Monsters, Inc.
- Monsters University
- A Bug's Life
- Journey to the Center of the Earth
- Jimmy Neutron: Boy Genius
- Jetsons: The Movie
- The SpongeBob SquarePants Movie
- Good Burger
- Snow White and the Seven Dwarfs
- Cinderella
- Sleeping Beauty
- Lilo and Stitch
- Inside Out
- Cloudy with a Chance of Meatballs
- Cloudy with a Chance of Meatballs 2
- How to Train Your Dragon
- Bruce Almighty
- Evan Almighty
- The Time Machine
- Jumanji
- Zathura: A Space Adventure
- Beauty and the Beast
- The One
- Ghost Rider
- Rob-B-Hood
- Garfield: The Movie
- Mars Needs Moms

=== Fillers ===
- Chutti Seithigal
- Comedy Juniors
- Daddy My Hero
- Rum Bum Bum
- School Savari
- School Singer
- Spell Champ: Power of Words
- Chutti TV Birthday Wishes

== Music ==
Tracklist
No.	Title	Length
1.	"Chutti TV Logo Song"	1:00

== See also ==
- Sun Group
- Sun TV Network
