= Mr. High Heels =

- Poster
- Chinese: 高跟鞋先生
- Directed by: Lu Ke
- Written by: Kim yeon hwa (Korea)
- Production companies: Beijing Xiaoma Danghong Media; Le Vision Pictures (Beijing)
- Distributed by: Le Vision Pictures (Beijing)
- Release date: 14 February 2016
- Running time: 94 minutes
- Country: China
- Language: Mandarin
- Box office: CN¥103.6 million (China)

Mr. High Heels (Chinese: 高跟鞋先生) is a 2016 Chinese romance comedy film directed by Lu Ke. It was released on 14 February 2016, in China by Le Vision Pictures.

== Plot ==
Hang Yuan, a man who's been in love with a friend for a very long time, is willing to do anything to win her over. Even cross-dressing. Otaku game designer Hang Yuan (played by Du Jiang), crushes on fellow student Li Ruo Xin (played by Xue Kai Qi) from an early age; however, each time he decides to confess his love, Ruo Xin declares that she has entered a new romance. Since being betrayed by her ex fiancé, Ruoxin no longer believes in men, and instead she gets closer and closer to Sammi ( played by Li Yuan). As a result, Hang Yuan is in despair. At this juncture, his good friend from a wealthy family, Lin Sen Sen (Chen Xuedeng), offers a solution to his problems. He proposed to Hang Yuan that he cross-dress in an attempt to approach Ruo Xin in his bold pursuit of love. Accidentally, Hang Yuan gains instant internet fame and becomes an internet sensation. However, these good times do not last long, and Ruo Xin soon sees through his disguise.

== Cast ==
- Du Jiang as Hang Yuan
- Fiona Sitas Li Ruoxin
- Yu Xintian
- Cheney Chen as Lin Sensen
- Wong Cho-lam as Sister Jin
- Huo Siyan
- Li Yuan as Sami
- Xiao Xiao
- Li Yu

== Reception ==
The film has grossed CN¥103.6 million in China.
