= Dream Land Isfahan =

Iranian amusement park

Dream land
- Location: Isfahan, Iran
- Status: Operating
- Opened: 2014
- Theme: Electronic simulation Sci-Fi
- Operating season: Year round
- Area: 170,000 m^{2} (1,800,000 sq ft)

Dreamland Isfahan (Persian: شهر رویاها, romanized: Shahr-e Roya-ha) is an amusement park and resort in Isfahan, Iran built in 2014 by Municipality of Isfahan, Chinese company Fantawild for a total cost 60 billion tomans.

== Locations ==
There are three 3D film cinemas, a Worm Around rollercoaster among other rides.
