= Boonie Bears: Back to Earth =

- Chinese theatrical release poster
- Traditional Chinese: 熊出沒·重返地球
- Simplified Chinese: 熊出没·重返地球
- Hanyu Pinyin: Xióng Chūmò: Chóngfǎn Dìqiú
- Directed by: Lin Huida
- Written by: Wan Qin; Xu Yun; Jiang Lin
- Produced by: Zhang Bo; Xiao Yi
- Edited by: Wu Lezhao; Tang Yuanzhi
- Music by: Li Zhiping
- Production company: Fantawild Animation
- Distributed by: Fantawild Animation
- Release date: 1 February 2022
- Running time: 97 minutes
- Country: China
- Language: Standard Chinese
- Box office: RMB 955 million ($152 million USD)

Boonie Bears: Back to Earth is a 2022 Chinese animated science fiction comedy film, the eighth film in the Boonie Bears series and the series' tenth anniversary film. The film is directed by Lin Huida. It was released in China on 1 February 2022.

== Plot ==
Bramble has always dreamed of becoming a great hero in order to gain recognition from everyone, especially his older brother, Briar. A piece of the alien nucleus that fell from the sky broke the peace of Pine Tree Mountain, but unexpectedly, Bramble merged with the alien nucleus and became a bear with alien wisdom and energy. However, this also brought about the pursuit of "alien" Avi who wanted to reclaim the nucleus. In order to do so, Avi deliberately causes trouble to make it look like bramble did it. Just as Avi was about to succeed, an attack by a mysterious high-tech army completely disrupted all plans and put Bramble's team and even the entire Earth in great danger. In the dire situation, Bramble and everyone worked together to defeat the villains and protect Avi's final home.

== Original voice cast ==
- Zhang Bingjun as Bramble
- Zhang Wei as Briar
- Tan Xiao as Vick
- Li Wanyao as Avi
- Cheng Ziyang
- Liu Siqi

== Release ==
Boonie Bears: Back to Earth was released theatrically in China on 1 February 2022 as part of the Chinese New Year slate. Official early screenings began on 15 and 16 January.

== Reception ==
Writing in The Guardian, Phil Hoad awarded the film three stars, and considered the film to be lacking in originality, comparing its visual and plot similarities to the Transformers and Kung Fu Panda, but praised the detail of the animation and comedy, concluding that it was "an incoherent splurge, but it's moving in the right direction". Reviewer Rich Cline commented negatively on the under-developed theme and the "several moments in which all seems desperately lost", but praised the voice work, engagement, and animation, and overall gave the film three and a half stars.

=== Box office ===
The film grossed 106 million RMB on its day of release, the highest-ever single-day gross for an animated Chinese New Year film in China. It was the highest-grossing animated film of the 2022 Chinese New Year period, grossing $563 million RMB (US$89.44 million) over the holiday its first week and earning an opening weekend of $249 million RMB. On 28 March, it passed US$152 million to become the highest-grossing film in the Boonie Bears franchise.
