= Boonie Bears: The Hidden Protector =

2026 Chinese animated film

- Theatrical release poster
- Chinese: 熊出没·年年有熊
- Directed by: Lin Huida
- Written by: Xu Yun; Wan Qin; Jiang Lin; Wang Yifei
- Produced by: Daisy Shang
- Starring: Zhang Bingjun; Tan Xiao; Zhang Wei
- Production company: Fantawild Animation
- Distributed by: Fantawild (China); CMC Pictures (International)
- Release date: February 17, 2026 (China)
- Running time: 118 minutes
- Country: China
- Language: Mandarin
- Box office: $154 million

Boonie Bears: The Hidden Protector (Chinese: 熊出没·年年有熊) is a 2026 Chinese animated fantasy comedy film directed by Lin Huida and produced by Fantawild Animation. It is the twelfth installment in the Boonie Bears film series and was released in mainland China on 17 February 2026, coinciding with the Chinese New Year holiday.

The film represents a creative shift for the franchise, introducing a Chinese fantasy setting rooted in traditional folklore, particularly the legend of the Nian.

== Background ==
The Boonie Bears franchise is one of China's most successful animated series, with over a decade of annual Spring Festival releases and billions in cumulative box office revenue.

By 2026, the series had become the first Chinese animated franchise to accompany audiences through a full Chinese zodiac cycle, establishing itself as a major tradition of holiday family entertainment.

== Plot ==
The film is inspired by the legend of the Nian, a mythical creature associated with the Chinese New Year. In this adaptation, the Nian is reimagined as twin guardian beings who protect humanity from a destructive force known as Sha.

== Production ==
The film marks the franchise's first major shift from science fiction themes to a fantasy setting rooted in traditional Chinese culture and mythology.

According to industry observers, the film emphasizes cultural elements such as Spring Festival customs, including fireworks and symbolic traditions, integrating them into the narrative structure.

== Release ==
International distribution followed in multiple regions, including Australia, New Zealand, Southeast Asia, and North America, with English-dubbed versions produced for global audiences.

== Reception ==
The film was positioned as a family-oriented fantasy feature and continued the franchise's reputation as a reliable holiday release appealing to children and families.

Critics noted its strong incorporation of Chinese cultural themes and its reinterpretation of traditional folklore for modern audiences.
