= Boonie Bears: The Wild Life =

2021 Chinese animated fantasy comedy film

- Promotional poster
- Traditional Chinese: 熊出沒·狂野大陸
- Simplified Chinese: 熊出没·狂野大陆
- Literal meaning: Roaming Bears: The Wild Land
- Hanyu Pinyin: Xióng Chūmò: Kuángyě Dàlù
- Directed by: Leon Ding; Shao Heqi
- Screenplay by: Xu Yun; Cui Tiezhi; Zhang Yu
- Starring: Zhang Bingjun; Tan Xiao; Zhang Wei; Liu Pei; Zhou Ziyu; Zhu Guangzu; Jia Chenlu
- Music by: Roc Chen
- Production companies: Fantawild Animation; HG Entertainment; Sunac Culture; Lian Ray Pictures
- Distributed by: China Film Co., Ltd. Lian Ray Pictures; Maoyan; HG Entertainment; Suniverse; Fantawild Animation
- Release date: 12 February 2021 (China)
- Running time: 99 minutes
- Country: China
- Language: Standard Chinese
- Budget: 250 million RMB (reportedly)
- Box office: 600 million RMB (US$93 million)

Boonie Bears: The Wild Life (Chinese: 熊出没·狂野大陆) is a 2021 Chinese Computer animated science fiction comedy film, and the seventh feature film in the Boonie Bears series. The story follows Logger Vick who participates in a contest with Bramble and Briar, when guests who have been transformed into animals. The film received mixed to positive reviews from critics.

== Synopsis ==
At the Mountain Pine area, Logger Vick visits an amusement park named the Wild Life that he learned from his old friend. The visitors uses bracelets that can transform humans to an animal of your choice upon, as well as a super-transforming version. Contestants then compete with a range of other groups through an elimination round and a finals round. The winner group then receives one million dollars. With the belief that this price will be the solution to his problems, after taking a selfie with a guinea pig-turned visitor, Vick starts to have fun at the place. However, the bear brothers Bramble and Briar also secretly entered the park, and they teamed up together with a mysterious man named Leon. Vick then receives a sample package of the various animal choices he can change into. This choices can range from a bear, a chameleon and a lion.

During the first round, the team struggled to earn their spot at the finals, but succeeded in a down-to-the wire contest. Nevertheless, the team secured the spot and that the 'Wild Life' was originally conceived by Tom and Leon, the latter of which inventing most technologies and constructed the park to bring happiness due to that his deceased daughter Lily who was thrilled by his invention. As a result, Leon attempted to shut the park since that the super-transforming technology is unsafe and results in savage animal states. Hence, those animal states, along with Bramble and Briar, were captured, while Tom is transformed into a chimera and fought Leon debating with him if the park is safe. Subsequently, Vick destroys the artificial intelligence, which resulted in an explosion that ended up killing Tom as Vick, the bears and Leon successfully escaped.

At the end of the day, everybody is freed and Vick talks to a news anchor about happiness, in which he believed that the primitive state drives happiness and uses this to deceive staff of the Wild Life.

== Cast ==
Character Name	Voice actor
Bramble	Zhang Bingjun
Vick	Tan Xiao
Briar	Zhang Wei
Leon	Liu Pei
Tom	Zhu Guangzu

== Production ==
According to the filmmakers, animating the Wild Land contest venue was an extremely complex process that required 3,000 computers to render simultaneously every day. In one three-minute sequence in particular, the average time for a machine to render a frame was 20 hours – equivalent to 120 machines rendering for 30 days, 24 hours a day. Boonie Bears: The Wild Life is the first Chinese animated film in which humans transform into other animals. According to Daisy Shang, president of Fantawild Animation, this required a "special rigging system" to animate realistically.

The producers stated that film is focused on the theme of happiness. It explores the essence of happiness and how happiness influences human behavior. The directors expressed hope that both children and adults watching the movie would think about the question of what happiness is. They hoped the film would make audiences think about their lives and their futures.

The theme song "I Will Always Be Here" is sung by Lala Hsu.

== Release ==
The film was scheduled for a Chinese New Year release on 25 January 2020, but was delayed by the COVID-19 outbreak. It was subsequently screened at the 2020 Shanghai International Film Festival.

It was released on 12 February 2021 (Chinese New Year) in mainland China. Internationally, the film released on 12 February 2021 in Japan, 19 February 2021 in Australia, and 7 May 2021 in Canada. And also released on Netflix on 4 December 2021.

On its first day, the film earned 101 million RMB (US$15.6 million) at the box office. Its three-day gross was 236 million RMB (US$36.5 million), making it the fourth highest-grossing film of the 2021 Chinese New Year weekend.

== Reception ==
The film received mixed to generally positive reviews, with a score of 6.3 out of 10 on Douban and 8.8 out of 10 on Maoyan as of January 2022. Reviewers praised it for its family entertainment value, but criticised its usage of ideas from other established films such as Zootopia. It was also nominated for a Golden Rooster Award for Best Animation at the 2020 Golden Rooster Awards.
