= List of animated feature films before 1940 =

A list of animated feature films released prior to 1940.

Title	Country	Director	Production company	Animation technique	Notes	Release date
1916
Creation	United States	Pinto Colvig	The Animated Film Corporation	Traditional/Cutout	Claimed first animated feature; Lost film	1916
1917
El Apóstol (The Apostle)	Argentina	Quirino Cristiani		Traditional/Cutout	Lost film: first Argentinian animated film	November 9, 1917
1918
Sin dejar rastros (Without a Trace)	Argentina	Quirino Cristiani		Traditional/Cutout	Lost film	1918
1924
Vida y milagros de Don Fausto (The Life and Miracles of Jiggs)	Chile	Carlos EspejoCarlos F. Borcosque		Traditional/Cutout	Possibly Lost film; first Chilean animated film	September 1924
1926
The Adventures of Prince Achmed; Die Abenteuer des Prinzen Achmed	Germany	Lotte Reiniger		Silhouette	The oldest surviving animated feature and the first German animated film.	September 23, 1926
1927
A Look Back into the Prehistoric World; Ein Rückblick in die Urwelt	Germany	N/A		Cutout	Lost film	1927
The Story of the Flag	United Kingdom	Anson Dyer		Cutout	Lost film	1927
1931
Peludópolis (Peludo City); Peludópolis	Argentina	Quirino Cristiani		Traditional/Cutout	Lost film and the first animated feature film with sound.	September 18, 1931
1935
The New Gulliver; Новый Гулливер	Soviet Union	Aleksandr Ptushko	Mosfilm	Stop motion/Live action	Combines live-action with animation, and the first animated feature film to be made in the Soviet Union.	March 25, 1935
1937
The Tale of the Fox; Le Roman de Renard	Germany France	Ladislas Starevich		Stop motion	Although completed in 1930, it remained unreleased for years because of problems with the original French soundtrack. It premiered in Berlin in 1937 with a German soundtrack, and was released with a new French soundtrack in April 1941. It was also the first French animated film.	April 10, 1937
The Academy Award Review of Walt Disney Cartoons	United States	Burt Gillett; Wilfred Jackson; David Hand		Traditional	Package film. The first animated feature film to be presented in Technicolor.	May 19, 1937
The Seven Ravens; Die sieben Raben	Germany	Ferdinand Diehl; Hermann Diehl		Stop motion		December 2, 1937
Snow White and the Seven Dwarfs	United States	David Hand; William Cottrell; Wilfred Jackson; Larry Morey; Perce Pearce; Ben Sharpsteen	Walt Disney Productions	Traditional	Oldest surviving American animated feature overall, and the first to use cels as its medium; the film won a special Academy Award for the first animated feature.	December 21, 1937 (Carthay Circle Theatre) February 4, 1938
1939
The Golden Key; Золотой ключик	Soviet Union	Aleksandr Ptushko	Mosfilm	Stop motion/Live action	Combines live-action with animation; Ptushko's last foray into animation.	July 1, 1939
Gulliver's Travels	United States	Dave Fleischer	Fleischer Studios	Traditional	The first American Technicolor animated feature film not to be made by Disney. Also first Technicolor animated feature film made in World War II.	December 22, 1939

Key: Film considered lost

== Highest-grossing animated films of the Period ==
Rank	Title	Studio	Release Year	Gross	Ref
1	Snow White and the Seven Dwarfs	Walt Disney Productions	1937	$8,000,000	
2	Gulliver's Travels	Fleischer Studios	1939	$3,270,000	
3	Academy Award Review of Walt Disney Cartoons	Walt Disney Productions	1937	$45,472	
