= Boonie Bears =

- Boonie Bears characters. From left to right: Bramble, Warren, Vick & Briar
- Genre: Comedy; Adventure
- Directed by: Ding Liang; Xing Xuhui
- Starring: Rick Jay Glen; Justin J. Wheeler; Paul "Maxx" Rinehart; Toni Thompson; Siobhan Lumsden
- Opening theme: 我还有点小糊涂
- Ending theme: 我的甜蜜
- Country of origin: China
- Original language: Mandarin
- No. of seasons: 15
- No. of episodes: 936

Production
- Producer: Liu Fuyuan
- Running time: 13 minutes
- Production company: Fantawild Animation

Original release
- Network: Aniworld; BRTV Kaku; Central China Television; Beijing Television Network
- Release: 19 January 2012 – present

Boonie Bears (simplified Chinese: 熊出没; traditional Chinese: 熊出沒; pinyin: xióng chūmò, "Roaming Bears"; Bear Hunting) is a Chinese animated television series shown on multiple Chinese platforms and television stations, including Central China Television (CCTV) and Beijing Television Network (BTV). The series features two Asian black bears, Briar and Bramble, who try to stop Logger Vick from destroying their forest home. Some other minor characters, mainly animals, are also shown, such as an owl, a gopher and two monkeys.

The franchise is Fantawild Animation's tentpole and "has been the biggest animation brand in China for many years" according to Variety. As of 2024, the animation brand has developed more than 3,000 products, covering a wide range of categories like food, beverages, clothing, learning supplies and toys.

== Origin ==
Boonie Bears was first shown in January 2012 and became the most popular children's show in China. More than 600 thirteen-minute episodes have been produced so far. The series is produced by Fantawild Holdings Inc.

== Creation and translations ==
Although originally created in China, Boonie Bears has been translated to other languages, such as English, Spanish, French, Russian, Tamil, Malayalam, Bengali, Arabic (as بندق وبرعم on Basma) and Hindi (as Babloo Dabloo on BIG Magic). It has now been distributed to 82 countries worldwide and partnered with Netflix, Sony, and Disney.

== Characters ==
=== Victor "Vick" Von Finkelstein ===
Vick (formerly called Logger Vick) (光头强; 光頭強; Guāngtóu Qiáng) is a logger who often runs into the animals for his misdeeds against the forest. He is considered as the primary antagonist in the earlier seasons, until redeeming himself and eventually becoming one of the main protagonists starting in season 8: Adventure 1. He is bald, usually wearing a hard hat or an Ushanka to conceal it. Vick wears a jacket and jeans. He is often seen carrying a chainsaw which he uses to cut down the trees or a hunting rifle that he uses to try hunt down Briar and Bramble whatever they try to stop him from cutting down the trees. Despite his menacing demeanor, Vick is often stays determined in light of threats from the forest, his superiors and poverty, not wishing to be in conflict with anyone if possible, despite sometimes seeking vengeance as a hunter. Vick later decided to quit logging and becomes a tour guide to preserve the forest with his animal friends. (Voiced by: Toni Thompson (S1), Paul "Maxx" Rinehart (2-14)

=== Mr. Li ===
Mr. Li (李老板; Lǐ láobǎn) is Logger Vick's unseen, merciless boss. He is primarily known for threatening Vick and deducting his salary for providing any benefits. (Voiced by: Rick Jay Glen, Paul "Maxx" Rinehart)

=== Briar ===
Briar (熊大; Xióngdà) is the co-protagonist of the show, he is an Asian black bear (except the color of his fur is reddish brown instead of black) who is Bramble's older brother, and a valiant, kind respected and sometimes arrogant stubborn and hardheaded figure in the forest. His intelligence and leadership allows him to rally other animals and battle whatever antagonist, be it Vick or not. Whenever the forest is not under threat, Briar has a carefree life with his brother inside their tree-like cave. (Voiced by: Rick Jay Glen (S1-4), Paul “Max” Rinehart (S5), Gene E. Hobbs III (S6-8), Kieran Katarey (S9-11), Patrick Freeman (S12-14)

=== Bramble ===
Bramble (熊二; Xióng'èr) is the co-protagonist of the show. Like his brother, he is an Asian black bear (except the color of his fur is light yellowish brown instead of black) and is Briar's younger brother. Bramble is physically slightly robust (more so than his brother though he and his brother are both quite stocky) but brash, dim-witted, naive, kind, hedonistic, also sometimes cowardly, clumsy and childish (though he claims the contrary). He also has a tendency to daydream, much to Briar's annoyance, although he has proven himself on several occasions. He also enjoys eating food of many kinds, specifically fruit, fish and honey. In relation to the character, he is thus similar to Po from Kung Fu Panda. (Voiced by: Justin J. Wheeler (S1-4), Joseph S. Lambert (S5-14)

=== Warren ===
Warren (蹦蹦; Bèngbèng) is a nervous red squirrel and a friend of the bears. He likes pine cones and nuts. Warren's agility allows him to weave through threats and conduct espionage for the bears. He is allergic to snacks. He is also mistaken for a female due to his voice. (Voiced by: Toni Thompson, Siobhan Lumsden)

=== Herbert "Herb" Diggs ===
Herbert Diggs (萝卜头; 蘿蔔頭; Luóbotóu; 'Radish Head') is a gopher who lives in the forest. He is unusually obsessed with radishes, carrots and turnips, attempting to secure them at all ends when given the chance. His expertise in subterranean navigation and excavation gives him the upper hand in many confrontations. His voice is somewhat high-pitched in the Mandarin version. (Voiced by: Toni Thompson, Justin J. Wheeler, Joseph S. Lambert)

=== Hoo Hoo ===
Hoo Hoo (涂涂; Tútu) is a barn owl who lives in the forest. She is very forgetful and lazy, dozing even in her flight. She is only occasionally helpful and refrains to join their conflicts. More often than not she is also mistaken for a male due to her voice which sound like a high-pitched version of Rick Jay Glen’s voice. (Voiced by: Toni Thompson, Rick Jay Glen, Siobhan Lumsden)

=== King Tiki ===
Tiki (吉吉; Jíji) is an arrogant, and greedy monkey. He is the self-proclaimed ruler of the forest that occasionally runs into conflict with other animals and questions Briar's leadership. He and his servant Babu originally came from a jungle along with other monkeys before they were accidentally shipped and transported to the Pine Tree Mountain forest where they currently live. He really loves fruit, especially bananas. He usually keeps a pineapple crown. He also holds a curved stick in his hands containing a hanging pine cone and wears a necklace made of leaves. (Voiced by: Paul "Maxx" Rinehart)

=== Babu ===
Babu (毛毛; Máomao) is a small golden marmoset who is the loyal sidekick servant and best friend of Tiki. He admires Tiki and is like both a son and little brother to him. He likes bananas just as much Tiki does. (Voiced by: Rick Jay Glen, Gene E. Hobbs III, Siobhan Lumsden)

=== Fabian ===
Fabian (肥波; Féibō) is a British Shorthair who became Vick's pet to escape his nomadic life. A fraudulent con artist, he often manipulates Vick and other creatures for private gains. He likes food, particularly fish. Vick officially adopted him in the Boonie Bears Forest Frenzy episode I'm Feline Fine!. (Voiced by: Toni Thompson, Rick Jay Glen, Siobhan Lumsden)

=== Natasha ===
Natasha (翠花; Cuìhuā) is a female Asian black bear (except the color of her fur is light reddish brown instead of black). She lives in the city and works in a circus. Both Briar and Bramble have a crush on her, although she perceives them friends. She also came to the forest for the bears once. (Voiced by: Toni Thompson)

=== Louie ===
Louie (老鳄; 老鱷; Lǎoè; 'Old Alligator') is a Chinese alligator who lives in the city along with his friends. He also works in the circus. He often tells stories to his circus friends and the bears. He laughs very loudly, and has also stolen Vick's mother's ornaments. (Voiced by: Justin J Wheeler)

=== Shao Lin ===
Shao Lin (铁掌大师; 鐵掌大師; Tiězhǎng Dàshī) is a South China tiger who also works in circus and who only appears in Boonie Bears Or Bust. He lives in a cave with his friends in city. He knows martial arts and is often seen practicing. He sometimes saves the bears from Vick. (Voiced by: Rick Jay Glen)

=== Sheldon ===
Sheldon (拖拖; Tuōtuō) is a small tortoise. He is also a worker in the circus and only appears in Boonie Bears or Bust. He has a big iron ball which he likes a lot, usually wears a cap, and walks much slower than the other characters. (Voiced by: Toni Thompson)

=== Carly ===
Carly (赵琳; Zhào Lín) is a teenage girl coming from a small town. Sometimes, she takes foolish decisions. She likes the forest and nature. In the English episodes where she first appeared, she is trying to find her friend Kitty, which happens to be a Siberian Tiger. She wants Logger Vick to help her (who was, at this point, a tour guide and thus in league with the creatures) to find her tiger friend. She was the only female characters to have a main role. She is also the main protagonist of her own spin-off series, titled Adventurer Carly. (Voiced by: Carly Leung)

=== Maurice ===
Maurice (大马猴; Dà mǎ hóu) is a swindler and gangster. He and his partner Arnold have an abundant criminal history, working for many crime lords as henchmen. He is tall and thin, values image and carries a comb all the time. He is also self-indulgent, narcissistic and self-centered. He also has a bit of a French or German accent.(Voiced by: Toni Thompson, Justin J Wheeler, Gene E. Hobbs III)

=== Arnold ===
Arnold (二狗; Ér gǒu) is a pudgy and short criminal and sidekick of Maurice, who he aids in their quest. Though violent, he is often seen more as an annoyance than anything with his reckless tendencies. He also speaks with a lisp. (Voiced by: Rick Jay Glen, Paul "Maxx" Rinehart and Joseph S. Lambert)

=== Rex Vector ===
Rex Vector (天才威; tiān cái wei) was the primary antagonist of the show starting in Adventure 2. He is a proclaimed scientist, an inventor, and an animal poacher. However, his boss Wolfgang ends up firing him because he is unable to catch any animals because of Briar and Bramble. In Monster Plan, he creates a chimeric robotic monster along with special electronics that resemble fruits and beehives to collect the animals' powers. And in Boonie Bears: Monster Plan, he intends to create a far more powerful and improved version of the Monster Robot to win in a science competition. To accomplish his goals, he seeks to find various scattered energy stone fragments across the forest.

=== Mr. Pete ===
Mr. Pete (洞洞幺 dòng dòng yāo) is Rex Vector's animal partner, who is a hamster. He is very loyal to Rex Vector. Before he met Rex Vector, he couldn't walk. He tried a lot to let people buy him, but the employee of the pet store was afraid to sell a customer a lame hamster. However, Rex Vector brought him from the pet store and fixed his leg because he wants the science rewards. After he got a "Most caring award", he let Mr. Pete be his animal assistant and worked for him.

== Songs ==
=== Opening ===
- Seasons 1, 3-7, and films: "A bear's life"
- Season 2: "Universal adventure"
- Seasons 8-9: "Go forward bravely"
- Seasons 10-11: "Rainbow"
- Seasons 12-13: "A small world"
- Seasons 14-15: "Our treasures"

=== Ending ===
- Seasons 1-3: "Good morning forest"
- Seasons 4-7: "My sweetness"
- Seasons 8-9: "Forest time"
- Seasons 10-11: "Guardian"
- Seasons 12-13: "Fantasy adventure"
- Seasons 14-15: "We're not making trouble"

== Series overview ==
Season	Title	Episodes	Originally released	
Season	Title	Episodes	First released	Last released
1	Boonie Bears	104	January 19, 2012	December 29, 2012
2	Boonie Bears or Bust	104	May 31, 2012	September 29, 2012
3	Boonie Bears: Forest Frenzy	104	July 13, 2013	March 29, 2014
4	Boonie Bears: Spring into Action	52	November 27, 2014	
5	Boonie Bears: Snow Daze	52	July 10, 2015	
6	Boonie Bears: Sunsational Summer	52	February 13, 2016	
7	Boonie Bears: Autumn Awesomeness	52	June 9, 2016	
8	Boonie Bears: The Adventurers	52	November 28, 2017	
9	Boonie Bears: The Adventurers 2	52	February 11, 2019	
10	Boonie Bears: Monster Plan	52	October 1, 2020	
11	Boonie Bears: Monster Plan 2	52	August 12, 2022	
12	Boonie Bears: Shrunk	52	August 3, 2024	
13	Boonie Bears: Shrunk 2	52	March 21, 2025	
14	Boonie Bears: The Lost Treasures	52	October 1, 2025	
15	Boonie Bears: The Lost Treasures 2	52	October 1, 2026	
16	Boonie Bears: Back to the Primitive Age	52	TBA	

== Other media ==
=== Feature films ===
Fantawild has produced 2 television films and 10 feature films in the Boonie Bears brand. The first television film Boonie Bears: Homeward Journey was released in 8 February 2013 and the second television film Boonie Bears: Robo-Rumble was released in 2014. The first feature film based on the series titled Boonie Bears: To the Rescue premiered in China on 17 January 2014. A second film, Boonie Bears: Mystical Winter, was released on 30 January 2015. A third installment, Boonie Bears: The Big Top Secret, was released on 16 January 2016. A fourth film, Boonie Bears: Fantastica, was released on 28 January 2017. A fifth film in the series, Boonie Bears: The Big Shrink, was released on 16 February 2018. The sixth installment, Boonie Bears: Blast Into the Past, premiered in China on 5 February 2019 and was later released in international territories. The seventh installment, Boonie Bears: The Wild Life, was released in China on 12 February 2021. Boonie Bears: Back to Earth was released in China on 1 February 2022 as part of the Chinese New Year slate. Boonie Bears: Guardian Code was released in China on 22 January 2023, Boonie Bears: Time Twist was released on 10 February 2024, and Boonie Bears: Future Reborn was released on 29 January 2025. Most of their films are distributed by Viva Pictures in North America.

On 28 February 2026, CMC Pictures announced that the 2026 Chinese New Year film Boonie Bears: The Hidden Protector (released on 17 February in mainland China) would be distributed in an English dubbed version on 5 March 2026 in Australia and New Zealand, and on 13 March 2026 in the US and Canada.

==== Crew ====
Role	Films									
Role	Boonie Bears: To the Rescue	Boonie Bears: A Mystical Winter	Boonie Bears: The Big Top Secret	Boonie Bears: Entangled Worlds	Boonie Bears: The Big Shrink	Boonie Bears: Blast Into the Past	Boonie Bears: The Wild Life	Boonie Bears: Back to Earth	Boonie Bears: Guardian Code	Boonie Bears: Time Twist
Director(s)	Ding Liang	Ding Liang; Liu Fuyuan	Ding Liang; Lin Yongchang	Ding Liang; Lin Yongchang; Lin Huida	Ding Liang; Lin Yongchang; Lin Huida	Ding Liang; Lin Huida	Ding Liang; Shao Heqi	Lin Huida	Lin Yongchang; Shao Heqi	Lin Huida
Producer(s)				Ding Liang; Lin Ning; Liu Daoqiang; Shuai Xiaoqiu; Cai Fuqing; Liu Xiaodong; Jin Zhengwei	Liu Daoqiang; Li Xiaoping; Zeng Maojun; Zheng Zhihao; Cai Fuqing; Cheng Wu; Lei Ying; Xu Tianfu; Liu Rong; Li Xiaodong	Liu Daoqiang; Zhang Zhao; Zeng Maojun; Lei Ying; Xu Tianfu; Liu Rong; Li Xiaodong; Zhou Maofei; Liu Jian	Bai Anwei	Zhang Bo; Xiao Yi	Liu Yanjuan; Li Xiaohong; Wang Qiang; Wang Lei; Peng Mingyu; Li Jinbo; Yang Wen; Han Huimin; Wang Xueke; Mao Chao; Lai Yijie; Liu Ying; Liu Ting	
Writer(s)	Liu Fuyuan	Liu Fuyuan	Liu Fuyuan		Xu Yun; Wan Qin; Jiang Lin	Xu Yun; Wan Qin; Jiang Lin	Xu Yun; Cui Tiezhi; Zhang Yu	Xu Yun; Wan Qin; Jiang Lin	Cui Tiezhi; Liu Zhenjie; Xu Yun	Xu Yun; Wan Qin; Jiang Lin
Composer(s)		Li Zhiping; Rick Jay Glen	Qin Zao; Li Zhiping		Zhao Yingjun	Roc Chen	Roc Chen	Li Zhiping	Qin Zao; Li Zhiping	
Studio(s)	Fantawild Animation	Fantawild Animation	Fantawild Animation	Fantawild Animation	Fantawild Animation	Fantawild Animation	Fantawild Animation	Fantawild Animation	Fantawild Animation	Fantawild Animation
Distributor(s)	Fantawild	Fantawild	Fantawild	Fantawild	Fantawild	Fantawild	Fantawild	Fantawild	Fantawild	Fantawild

==== Box office performance ====
Film	Release date	Chinese opening weekend	Box office gross			Ref(s)
Film	Release date	Chinese opening weekend	China	Other territories	Worldwide	Ref(s)
Boonie Bears: To the Rescue	17 January 2014		$39,910,000	$611,387	$40,521,387	
Boonie Bears: A Mystical Winter	30 January 2015		$47,581,416	$581,416	$47,581,416	
Boonie Bears: The Big Top Secret	16 January 2016	$15,942,975	$44,544,110	$606,280	$45,150,390	
Boonie Bears: Entangled Worlds	28 January 2017	$14,424,419	$76,630,780	$520,316	$77,151,096	
Boonie Bears: The Big Shrink	16 February 2018	$32,499,377	$96,509,976	$278,953	$96,788,929	
Boonie Bears: Blast Into the Past	5 February 2019	$27,894,234	$110,594,549	$1,774,710	$112,369,259	
Boonie Bears: The Wild Life	12 February 2021	$36,500,000	$97,200,000	$432,231	$97,632,231	
Boonie Bears: Back to Earth	1 February 2022		$149,590,000		$149,590,000	
Boonie Bears: Guardian Code	22 January 2023	$55,990,000	$220,210,000		$220,210,000	
Boonie Bears: Time Twist	10 February 2024	$60,800,000	$271,687,212		$271,687,212	
Boonie Bears: Future Reborn	29 January 2025	$43,760,000	$104,372,383	$210,332	$104,582,715	
Boonie Bears: The Hidden Protector	17 February 2026		$68,060,000		$68,060,000	
		$287,811,005	$1,326,890,426	$4,609,005	$1,330,918,015	
List indicator: A dark-grey cell indicates the information is not available for the film.

=== Books ===
- The Universal Adventure of the Bears (Jungle): Tracker
- The Universal Adventure of the Bears (Jungle): Gopher Wars
- The Universal Adventure of the Bears (Jungle): Invincible Fire Tongs
- The Universal Adventure of the Bears (Jungle): Become a Warrior
- The Universal Adventure of the Bears (Jungle): Werewolf Night

== Awards and nominations ==
Year	Award	Result
2012	"Five One Project" Award	Won
2012	First Prize of Excellent Domestic Animation of the Year	Won
2012	Italian "Gulf Cartoon Festival" Puchinella Award	Nominated
2012	The best anime of the 17th Italian Resnia Film Festival	Nominated

== Dubbed versions ==
- Bablu Dablu on Big Magic (Hindi)
- Bablu Dablu on Discovery Kids (Hindi, Tamil, Telugu)
- Varuthapadatha Karadi Sangam on Chutti TV (Tamil)
- Kirik Karadigalu on Chintu TV (Kannada)
- Bear Brothers on Kushi TV (Telugu)
- Boonie Bears on Disney Channel (Mandarin)
- Boonie Bears on Star Chinese Movies (Mandarin)
- Boonie Bears on Star Chinese Channel (Mandarin)
- Boonie Bears on RTV ( (Bangladesh) Bengali)
- Bablu Dablu on Rongeen TV ( (India) Bengali)
- بندق وبرعم on Basma, Jordan TV, and Shehab TV ( (Saudi Arabia) (Iraq) Arabic)
- Boonie Bears on StarTimes Kids (French, Portuguese, Swahili)
- Ayı Kardeşler on Show TV (Turkish)
- Forest Protector Bears (Khers Haye Mohafeze Jangal) on IRIB Pooya & Nahal (Persian)
- Медведи-соседи on Карусель (Carousel) (Russian)
- Мишки-братишки on YouTube (Russian)
- Boonie Bears on MNC TV (Indonesia)
- Boonie Bears on Rajawali Televisi (Indonesia)

== See also ==
- Pleasant Goat and Big Big Wolf, another children's television series in China
- Xingxing Fox, a Chinese cartoon
