= Boonie Bears: Future Reborn =

- Theatrical release poster
- 熊出没·重启未来
- Directed by: Lin Yongchang
- Written by: Xu Yun; Cui Tiezhi; Liu Zhenjie
- Produced by: Shang Linlin
- Production company: Fantawild Animation
- Distributed by: Fantawild
- Release date: 29 January 2025
- Running time: 108 minutes
- Country: China
- Language: Standard Chinese
- Budget: $40 million
- Box office: $101.99 million

Boonie Bears: Future Reborn (simplified Chinese: 熊出没·重启未来; traditional Chinese: 熊出沒·重啟未來) is a 2025 Chinese computer-animated science fiction comedy film, the eleventh film in the Boonie Bears franchise. It was written by Xu Yun (徐芸) and Cui Tiezhi (崔铁志) and directed by Lin Yongchang (林永长).

In the film, Bramble, Briar, and Vick unexpectedly follow time traveller Liang to a time 100 years in the future; they find that Earth is beset by environmental catastrophe, with humanity barely able to survive, and Vick is the culprit. Future Reborn is the last of a set of five science fiction installments in the Boonie Bears series.

The film was released on 29 January 2025 (Chinese New Year).

== Original voice cast ==
- Tan Xiao as Vick
- Zhang Bingjun as Bramble
- Zhang Wei as Briar

== Production ==
Producer Shang Linlin said that the film's postapocalyptic themes reflect a sense of powerlessness in the zeitgeist. According to Shang, the film aims to "show that even in the face of great difficulties, hope endures".

== Release ==
The film's premiere was held in Beijing on 22 January 2025. It was released on 29 January 2025 (Chinese New Year) in China.
