= Boonie Bears: Guardian Code =

- Theatrical release poster
- 熊出没·伴我“熊芯”
- Directed by: Lin Yongchang; Shao Heqi
- Written by: Cui Tiezhi; Liu Zhenjie; Xu Yun
- Produced by: Liu Yanjuan; Li Xiaohong; Wang Qiang; Wang Lei; Peng Mingyu; Li Jinbo; Yang Wen; Han Huimin; Wang Xueke; Mao Chao; Lai Yijie; Liu Ying; Liu Ting
- Starring: Zhang Bingjun; Zhang Wei; Tan Xiao
- Edited by: Tang Jinyang; Huang Yanping
- Music by: Qin Zao; Li Zhiping
- Production company: Fantawild
- Distributed by: Fantawild
- Release date: 22 January 2023
- Running time: 95 minutes
- Country: China
- Language: Mandarin
- Box office: US$222 million

Boonie Bears: Guardian Code is a 2023 Chinese computer animated science fiction comedy film. It is the ninth film in the Boonie Bears series and is directed by Lin Yongchang and Shao Heqi. In the film, Briar and Bramble lose their mother in a forest fire, and many years later, Vick brings them to a robot research institute, where they unexpectedly receive news of their mother.

It was released in China on 22 January 2023 (Chinese New Year). On 5 February, it surpassed US$200 million to become the highest-grossing film in the Boonie Bears franchise.

== Original voice cast ==
- Zhang Bingjun as Bramble
  - Zhang Ming as young Bramble
- Zhang Wei as Briar
- Tan Xiao as Vick
- Miao Yingying
- Jia Chenlu
- Nie Jixuan
- Wang Tianhao
- Wang Siyu

== Soundtrack ==
The film's main theme "Xing Shan Shan Yue Wan Wan" (星闪闪月弯弯) is sung by Yisa Yu.

== Release ==
Boonie Bears: Guardian Code was released in China on 22 January 2023 (Chinese New Year).
