= Boonie Bears: To the Rescue =

2014 Chinese animated film

Boonie Bears to the Rescue
- Theatrical release poster
- Directed by: Leon Ding
- Written by: Fuyuan Liu
- Based on: Boonie Bears
- Produced by: Fantawild Animation Inc. Le Vision Pictures
- Starring: Rick Jay Glen; Justin J. Wheeler; Paul "Maxx" Rinehart; Toni Thompson; Siobhan Lumsden
- Production company: Fantawild Animation Inc.
- Distributed by: Mr. Cartoon Pictures
- Release date: 17 January 2014 (China)
- Running time: 96 minutes
- Country: China
- Languages: Mandarin, English and Russian
- Box office: CN¥248 million (US$40 million)

Boonie Bears to the Rescue (Chinese: 熊出没之夺宝熊兵) is a 2014 Chinese animated adventure comedy film based on the animated television series Boonie Bears. It centers around Vick, Briar and Bramble's lives being intertwined with the fate of orphaned toddler Lola. A second film, Boonie Bears: Mystical Winter, was released one year later in 2015.

== Plot ==
On a stormy Night, thugs Maurice and Arnold crash their car in a tree when monkey lord, Tiki and his servant, Babu forced them to swerve off the road on the mountain, and a yellow suitcase slides out of the wreck. Meanwhile, logger Vick put his new lumbering tools to test, spooking the Bear Brothers - Briar and Bramble - into pursuit, and successfully steal the tool crate from Vick. Maurice and Arnold scramble to recover the case, but are steamrolled by the bears who confuse them with Vick. With his tools destroyed by the bears as well, Vick ends up taking the other suitcase before savagely beating the criminals, believing they are the bears. Vick and the bears then return to their respective homes.

On the next day, Vick discovers that a baby girl in a bear suit was inside instead of his tools. Noticing she was kidnapped from a police alert on TV, he set off to find the authorities and return her. The baby's interference causes Vick's pickup to behave erratically, alerting a police officer and getting his truck stuck. After freeing his truck with a scarecrow and securing her with tape, he was mistaken as the culprit by the officer pursuing him. Attempting to explain his circumstances and cut off the tape, the baby bites Vick, causing him to inadvertently launches his knife into the officer who thinks Vick is a murderer. Now a wanted criminal, Vick barely escapes pursuit in his slightly crippled truck.

Enraged by the trouble, she warranted, Vick seals his house and angrily scolds her for trashing his place. Instead of silencing the baby, her cries penetrate the entire forest. He later successfully pacifies her with a water gun, and learns her nickname "Lola" while washing her suit. Gradually, he becomes a fatherly figure to her. On a bicycle, Vick sets off to procure supplies for Lola when they are running short, only to be arrested by the officer. Maurice and Arnold happen to be illegally attaching missing person posters nearby in an effort to find Lola. Stopping to warn them, the officer is knocked out by the duo and they steal his patrol car. In the ensuing scuffle, Vick sneaks away undetected.

Suspecting Vick in possession of threatening gizmos, Briar invades Vick's house with Bramble, but the mission goes off-course when Bramble insists on acquiring food instead. While they empty Vick's stash, Lola almost reveals herself to Briar, who was jump-scared several times, unable to determine the cause nor convince Bramble. Lola sneaks into Bramble's bag and the brothers depart. At their cave, after Bramble almost mistakes her for an apple, the bears were confused and terrified by her appearance, having almost zero contact with humans other than Vick. They warm up to each other quickly and begin to hang out.

Vick, who was devastated when he discovers his cabin ransacked by bears, was relieved to have Lola gone. His past animosity against them gets the better of him in a nightmare, and he storms off to rescue her after discovering a claw mark on the door thinking that briar and bramble came to kidnapped Lola, unaware of the events occurred in his absence. The bears and Vick have a tense standoff and brief scuffle inside the tree while Lola suddenly succumbs to a fever, forcing Vick to rush her home. The brothers attempt to help Vick also, with Bramble inadvertently thwarting Maurice and Arnold. After repeated failures, Arnold and Maurice' unseen employer decides to take matters into his own hands.

Vick and the Bears come to an alliance with Lola's presence as the three constantly organize activities to entertain her, with the former even constructing an aerial bicycle while the bears follow them around in Vick's truck. Soon, mercenaries appear and attempt to capture Lola. While Vick attempts to dodge them, Briar and Bramble make use of their pyrotechnics and appropriate enemy equipment to fight them off, with Briar even indirectly incinerating a hostile blimp. Despite their best efforts, Vick and Lola were knocked out, snagged by Maurice and Arnold. The bears notice the stolen police car driving away and follow them in Vick's abandoned bike.

Vick was taken to the headquarters of a corporate enterprise, where their leader reveals himself as the mastermind behind Lola's disappearance: Lola was an orphan adopted by his deceased father, his predecessor. He desires to reclaim the inheritance passed to Lola, having sensed the fortune sealed in a vault only unlocked by her. Maurice and Arnold were amongst many working for him. Lola ends up tearing off his toupee, and Vick mocks him for being bald.

Briar and Bramble, having pursued the thugs to company grounds, sneak into a nearby warehouse. While mostly silent, the brothers accidentally alert a group of armed guards playing Majong and barely survive the ensuing pursuit under gunfire. Defeating them with disguises and a duet, the bears discover Vick and Lola's location. Briar sends Bramble to alert the authorities, and a nearby crane catches his eye. Bramble smashes the wrecking ball and Briar into the building, then slides down to assist. The CEO, Maurice and Arnold flee, leaving the bodyguards to stop the trio. Vick frees himself, and the bears easily pummel their opposition.

Briar, Vick and Bramble pursue them to a catwalk. Briar seizes Maurice, but the CEO retakes Lola by collapsing the bridge and an active turbine. Maurice escapes, and Arnold threatens to kill Briar if they approach. Using Briar's aerial advantage point and the turbine's winds keeping him airborne, Vick gets Bramble to launch himself. With the help of air currents fueling his spin, Briar viciously throws Vick at Maurice and Arnold, defeating them instantly.

The CEO eventually reaches the Vault, wanting Lola to unlocking its digital security measures with her hands but she refuses so he distracts her before she letting her do so. However, he is frustrated when he finds nothing but his legacy items from his youth and a letter from his father to Lola (in which he berates and blames her for it and everything). The trio storm the vault, and while the boss makes his escape on a reinforced elevator, Briar finds a window of opportunity to advance.

Still in disbelief, the CEO flees in a helicopter. Briar and Bramble grapple onto its landing skids, with Vick catching up by pole-vaulting. In the cabin, Lola messes with the controls, and the chopper flies erratically, forcing the three to also dodge various hazards ad eventually storm the vehicle. The bears' weight cause the aircraft to tilt, and Vick jumps out to save Lola, while Bramble and Briar grab him, holding onto the left access. In order to rid the intruders, the CEO activates autopilot but fails to evict Briar due to the latter's extreme mass. As they approach a chimney, at Vick's urging, they all bail and land safely in a towering industrial water tank moments before the collision. The CEO, having survived and clinging on a parachute, swears revenge at them but was cornered by a group of responding officers.

With the true mastermind imprisoned and Lola rescued, Vick was exonerated and declared a hero for his part, with everyone returning to their normal lives, though he remains confused to the chain of events that occurred. Disturbed by his boss Mr. Li in a snowy morning, an irritated Vick promises to continue supplying timber. As he hangs up, Vick discovers a parcel mailed to his doorstep. Inside, he discovers various repaired items photographs of Lola with the old man who adopted her, as well the reconstructed letter, in which he proclaims her importance to him as he was dying. Just when Vick finishes the letter with a tear to his eye, he was delighted to see the bears bringing Lola in celebration of the Chinese New Year.

== Characters ==
=== Vick ===
A failing lumberjack, Vick was pressured constantly by work but also pestered by local fauna hostile to his efforts. He strives to survive but often makes little progress.

=== Lola ===
An orphaned, innocent, mute and illiterate toddler adopted by a kind old man.

=== Briar ===
The brains of the bear brothers and protector of the forest. The benevolent Briar leads a peaceful life with his brother, displaying force when his loved ones come under threat.

=== Bramble ===
The brawn of the bear brothers. Though dim-witted and gluttonous, Bramble terrorizes his foes with brute force and works with his older brother in their endeavors.

=== Tiki ===
A self-proclaimed ruler of the forest barely recognized by other creatures.

=== Babu ===
Tiki's loyal monkey servant.

=== Ted Marshall Sr ===
The benevolent deceased father of the current CEO. Implied to seek wealth as much as his son in the past, Lola renewed his perspective and brought benevolence back to him yet again.

=== Ted Marshall Jr ===
The CEO of his corporation and son of his predecessor. Bonding well with his father in the past, their relations deteriorated in the pursuit of fortune. He is bent on retaking his lost fortune with the help of Maurice and Arnold, of which he believed belongs to him rightfully.

=== Policeman ===
A recurring officer who comically and ironically fails at his job.

=== Arnold ===
Maurice' brutish and menacing sidekick that often unsuccessfully helps Maurice.

=== Maurice ===
A cunning gangster roaming with Arnold as henchmen for hire.

== Box office ==
The film had grossed RMB 103 million (US$17 million) at the Chinese box office three days after being released. It had the highest-grossing opening weekend for a Chinese animated film and the third highest-grossing opening day for any animated film at the Chinese box office. More than a week after being released, it had grossed CN¥183 million (US$30.3 million). It is the highest grossing Chinese animated film in the country, beating the record previously held by Mission Incredible: Adventures on the Dragon's Trail.

== English dub ==
- Rick Jay Glen as Briar / Ted Marshall Jr. / Ted Marshall Sr. / Arnold / Babu / Vick's Father / additional voices
- Justin J. Wheeler as Bramble / Policeman / additional voices
- Paul "Maxx" Rinehart as Logger Vick / Tiki / Mr. Lee
- Toni Thompson as Maurice / Vick's Mom / additional voices
- Siobhan Lumsden as additional voices
