= Boonie Bears: A Mystical Winter =

2015 Chinese animated film

- Theatrical release poster
- 熊出没之雪岭熊风
- Directed by: Ding Liang; Liu Fuyuan
- Starring: Rick Jay Glen; Justin J. Wheeler; Paul "Maxx" Rinehart; Siobhan Lumsden; Jenny Ansell; Ethan Kiely; Che Devereux Scott Rinehart; Luc Alexander Mainland Rinehart
- Music by: Zhiping Li and Rick Jay Glen
- Production companies: Shenzhen Huaqiang Shuzi Dongman Co., Ltd; Le Vision Pictures (Tianjin) Co., Ltd; Fantawild Holdings Inc; Pearl River Pictures Co., Ltd; Beijing Iqiyi Co., Ltd; Beijing LeTV Mobile Media & Technology Co. Ltd; He Yi information technology (Beijing) Co., LTD; Tencent Video; TV.SOHU.COM; You Yang (Tian Jin) Dong Man Culture Media Co., LTD
- Distributed by: Le Vision Pictures (Tianjin) Co., Ltd; Mr. Cartoon Pictures Co., Ltd; Pearl River Pictures Co., Ltd; Shenzhen Huaqiang Shuzi Dongman Co., Ltd
- Release date: 30 January 2015
- Running time: 96 minutes approx.
- Country: China
- Languages: Mandarin Chinese; English
- Box office: China¥295.3million (US$47.5 million)

Boonie Bears: A Mystical Winter (Chinese: 熊出没之雪岭熊风) is a 2015 Chinese animated adventure comedy film directed by Ding Liang and Liu Fuyuan. It was released on 30 January 2015.

== Plot ==
Briar and Bramble heard the legend of an antlered polar bear-like creature known as the spirit of winter, who Bramble calls Neva. The spirit comes into the woods in winter, bringing snow and cold. When they were cubs, Bramble saw Neva, but his brother has never believed him.

Now older, they encounter the winter spirit when she brings the snow. She's attacked by winged people, and requires the help of the bear brothers to escape. The brothers attempt to rescue the creature when she's trapped on a train. When the train flies into the sky and crashes the Bear brothers and their monkey friends try to help Neva return to her mountain.

== Voice cast ==
Chinese cast:

- Zhang Wei
- Zhang Bingjun
- Tan Xiao
- Meng Yutian
- Sun Yaodong
- Zhao Xiaoyu
- Xin Yuan
- Wan Danqing

English cast:

- Rick Jay Glen
- Justin J. Wheeler
- Paul (Maxx) Rinehart
- Siobhan Lumsden
- Ethan Kiely
- Jenny Ansell
- Che Devereux Scott Rinehart
- Luc Alexander Mainland Rinehart

== Box office ==
As of 15 February 2015, the film has earned over US$40.13 million in China.

== See also ==
- Boonie Bears, the television series
- Boonie Bears: To the Rescue, the 2014 film based on the television series
