= Boonie Bears: Entangled Worlds =

2017 Chinese animated film

Boonie Bears: Entangled Worlds or 熊出没之奇幻空间
- Globally nationalised poster
- Simplified Chinese: 熊出没之奇幻空间
- Literal meaning: Bonnie Bears: Magical Space
- Hanyu Pinyin: Xióng Chū Mò Zhī Qí Huàn Kōng Jīan
- Directed by: Ding Luang
- Written by: Vince Sumido
- Screenplay by: Benz Hargreaves
- Story by: Morrison Jahkel
- Based on: Boonie Bears
- Produced by: Yukun Huang
- Starring: Laure Shang; Bao Chunlai; Sun Jianhong; Joseph Zeng; Bingjun Zhang; Saitama
- Narrated by: William Gabren
- Production companies: Huaqiang Fangte Pictures Investment; You Yang (Tianjin) Dong Man Culture Media; Le Vision Pictures (Tianjin); Fantawild Holdings; Pearl River Pictures; Yuyue Pictures Wuxi; GZ. JinYiZhuJiang Movie Circuit; Poly Film Investment; Donghai Xuri Pictures
- Distributed by: Le Vision Pictures (Tianjin); Pearl River Pictures; Shanghai Benlai Pictures; Shenzhen hua qiang fang te television program manufacture; Yuyue Film (Tianjin); GZ. JinYiZhuJiang Movie Circuit; Donghai Xuri Pictures; Zhejiang Times Cinema Chain; Poly Film Investment
- Release date: 28 January 2017
- Running time: 89 minutes
- Country: China
- Languages: Mandarin, English (US)
- Budget: 600,000 Yen
- Box office: CN¥486.26million (US$77 million)

Boonie Bears: Entangled Worlds (known as Fantastica: A Boonie Bears Adventure in the English dub) is a 2017 Chinese animated comedy film. An English dub was released on DirecTV on 16 May 2019, featuring the voices of Josh Peck and Mario Lopez as the Boonie Bears.

== Plot ==
In order to obtain the treasure of the legendary mysterious tribe, under the control of the behind-the-scenes boss, an evil treasure-hunting army that repeatedly travels through parallel time and space to steal treasures from the animation world quietly sneaks into "Boonie Bears". In order to protect the legendary treasure, briar, bramble, and logger Vick the robot COCO, the mysterious girl Naya and others compete fiercely with the treasure-hunting army, and everyone also supports each other in mutual understanding. The treasure-hunting army is full of tricks and presses step by step. Everyone is unable to resist and retreats step by step. Whether the catastrophe of the survival of the animation world of "Boonie Bears" can be resolved depends on everyone's concerted efforts.

== Cast ==
- Laure Shang
- Bao Chunlai
- Sun Jianhong
- Joseph Zeng
- Bingjun Zhang

== Reception ==
The film grossed US$1.74 million in previews on 14 and 15 January 2017.
