= Fantawild =

Chinese amusement park chain

- Native name: 华强方特
- Industry: Amusement parks
- Founded: Chongqing, China (2005 or 2007)
- Number of locations: 11
- Area served: China
- Owner: Huaqiang Group
- Website: www.fantawild.com

Fantawild
- Simplified Chinese: 华强方特
- Traditional Chinese: 華強方特
Transcriptions
Standard Mandarin
- Hanyu Pinyin: Huáqiáng Fāngtè

Fantawild (Chinese: 华强方特; pinyin: Huáqiáng Fāngtè) is a chain of amusement parks located in various cities of China. The first park opened in the mid-to-late 2000s in Chongqing. As of May 2020, 16 amusement parks operate under the Fantawild name, with seven currently under construction. The chain is owned by the Huaqiang Group. The mascot of the parks is a blue dinosaur named DuLuDuBi, and is typically used as the public image for the chain.

== Locations ==
Park name	Location	Opening date	Status
Dream Land Isfahan	Isfahan, Isfahan, Iran	2014	Operating
Fantawild	Wenfeng, Anyang, Henan, China	2021	Operating
Fantawild	Jingzhou, Hubei, China	2019	Operating
Fantawild	Jiangyou, Mianyang, Sichuan, China	2020	Operating
Fantawild	Taiyuan, Shanxi, China	2021	Operating
Fantawild	Ganzhou, Jiangxi, China	2021	Operating
Fantawild	Cixi, Ningbo, Zhejiang, China	2019	Operating
Fantawild	Zhongmu, Zhengzhou, Henan, China	2019	Operating
Fantawild Adventure	Jinghu, Wuhu, Anhui, China	2007	Removed
Fantawild Adventure	Shantou, Guangdong, China	2010	Operating
Fantawild Adventure	Taishan, Tai'an, Shandong, China	2010	Operating
Fantawild Adventure	Shenbei, Shenyang, Liaoning, China	2011	Operating
Fantawild Adventure	Shifeng, Zhuzhou, Hunan, China	2011	Operating
Fantawild Adventure	Zhongmu, Zhengzhou, Henan, China	2012	Operating
Fantawild Adventure	Binhai, Tianjin, China	2014	Operating
Fantawild Adventure	Jiayuguan, Gansu, China	2015	Operating
Fantawild Asian Legends	Qingxiu, Nanning, Guangxi, China	2018	Operating
Fantawild Dream Kingdom	Chengyang, Qingdao, Shandong, China	2011	Operating
Fantawild Dreamland	Jiujiang, Wuhu, Anhui, China	2010	Operating
Fantawild Dreamland	Tong'an, Xiamen, Fujian, China	2013	Operating
Fantawild Dreamland	Shifeng, Zhuzhou, Hunan, China	2016	Operating
Fantawild Dreamland	Zhongmu, Zhengzhou, Henan, China	2015	Operating
Fantawild Sci-Fi Theme Park	Jiangbei, Chongqing, China	2006	Removed
Fantawild Theme Park	Nanjiao, Datong, Shanxi, China	2015	Operating
Nantong Adventure Land	Gangzha, Nantong, Jiangsu, China	2013	Operating
Oriental Heritage	Huaiyin, Jinan, Shandong, China	2015	Operating
Oriental Heritage	Jiujiang, Wuhu, Anhui, China	2015	Operating
Oriental Heritage	Cixi, Ningbo, Zhejiang, China	2016	Operating
Oriental Heritage	Tong'an, Xiamen, Fujian, China	2017	Operating
Oriental Heritage	Cixian, Handan, Hebei, China	2018	Operating
Oriental Heritage	Changsha, Hunan, China	2018	Operating
Silk Road Culture Expo Park	Xiongguan, Jiayuguan, Gansu, China	2018	Operating

== Fantawild Animation ==
Fantawild Animation Inc. is a division of Fantawild that creates and produces animated films and shows, including the Boonie Bears franchise.

== See also ==
- Happy Valley, another chain of amusement parks in China
