= China–New Zealand relations =

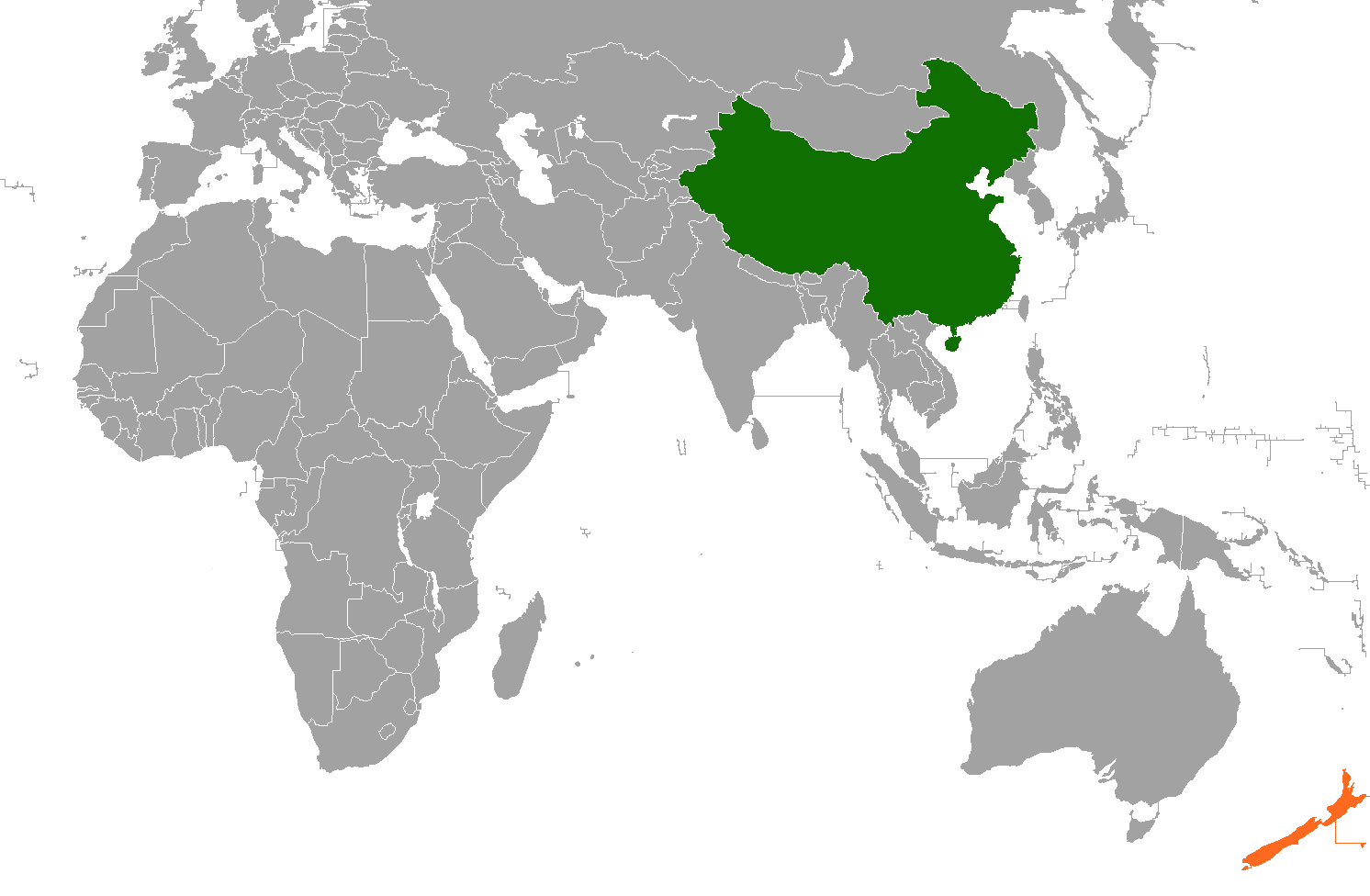

- China: New Zealand

Diplomatic mission
- Chinese Embassy, Wellington: New Zealand Embassy, Beijing

Envoy
- Ambassador Wang Xiaolong: Ambassador Grahame Morton

China–New Zealand relations or Sino–New Zealand relations are relations between the People's Republic of China (PRC) and New Zealand. New Zealand recognised the Republic of China after it lost the Chinese Civil War and retreated to Taiwan in 1949, but switched recognition to the People's Republic of China on 22 December 1972. Since then, economic, cultural, and political relations between the two countries have grown. China is New Zealand's largest trading partner in goods, and second largest trading partner in services. In 2008, New Zealand became the first developed country to enter into a free trade agreement with China. In recent years, New Zealand's extensive economic relations with China have been complicated by influence operations, espionage accusations, and the country's security ties to the United States.

In addition to formal diplomatic and economic relations, there has been significant people-to-people contact between China and New Zealand. Chinese immigration to New Zealand dates back to the gold rushes of the 1860s and has substantially increased since the 1980s.

== History ==
=== Qing dynasty China ===
New Zealand's contact with China started in the mid 19th century. The first records of ethnic Chinese in New Zealand were migrant workers from Guangdong province, who arrived during the 1860s Otago gold rush. Most of the migrant workers were male, with few women migrants. Emigration from China was driven by overpopulation, land shortages, famine, drought, banditry, and peasant revolts, which triggered a wave of Chinese migration to Southeast Asia, Australia, New Zealand, the United States, and Canada.

Early Chinese migrants encountered considerable racial discrimination and prejudice. In 1871, the New Zealand Government imposed a poll tax on Chinese migrants that was not repealed until 1944. Other discriminatory policies included an English literacy test, restrictive immigration measures, denial of old age pensions, and being barred from permanent residency and citizenship (from 1908 to 1952). After the Gold Rush ended in the 1880s, many of the former Chinese miners found work as market gardeners, shopkeepers, and laundry operators. There was some limited intermarriage with White and indigenous Māori women.

=== Republic of China, 1912–1949 ===
In 1903, the Qing dynasty had established a consulate in Wellington to deal with trade, immigration, and local Chinese welfare. Following the Xinhai Revolution in 1912, the Republic of China took over the consulate. The lack of a reciprocal New Zealand mission in China made the Republic of China's mission in Wellington serve as the primary point of contact between both governments until 1972. During the Republican era, New Zealand interests in China were largely represented by British diplomatic and consular missions. However, there were some attempts to establish New Zealand trade commissions in Tianjin and Shanghai.

Between 1912 and 1949, there were over 350 New Zealand expatriates living and working in China, including missionaries for various Christian denominations, medical workers, United Nations Relief and Rehabilitation Administration (UNRRA) workers, teachers, and telegraph workers. Some notable expatriates included the missionaries Annie James and James Huston Edgar, and the communist writer, teacher, and activist Rewi Alley.

During the Second World War, New Zealand society developed a more favourable view of China because of its status as a wartime ally against Japan. Chinese market gardeners were viewed as an important contribution to the wartime economy. New Zealand also eased its immigration policy to admit Chinese refugees and grant them permanent residency. In the postwar years, many Chinese migrants, including women and children, settled in New Zealand since the Communist victory in 1949 made it difficult for many to return home.

=== Cold War, 1949–1972 ===
Following the establishment of the People's Republic of China (PRC) in 1949, New Zealand did not initially recognise the new government. Instead, it joined Australia and the United States in continuing to recognise the Republic of China (ROC) government, which had relocated to Taiwan, as the legitimate government of China. Between 1951 and 1960, New Zealand and Australia consistently supported a US moratorium proposal to block Soviet efforts to seat the PRC as the lawful representatives of China in the United Nations and to expel the ROC representatives. By contrast, the United Kingdom had established diplomatic relations with the PRC in 1949. While the conservative National Party favoured the ROC, the social democratic Labour Party favoured extending diplomatic relations to the PRC. New Zealand and the PRC also fought on opposite sides during the Korean War, with the former supporting the United Nations forces and the latter backing North Korea.

The PRC government also expelled many missionaries and foreigners, including most New Zealand expatriates by 1951. One missionary, Annie James of the New Zealand Presbyterian Church's Canton Villages Mission, was imprisoned and interrogated. However, some pro-communist Westerners, including Rewi Alley, were allowed to remain in China. Alley pioneered a working model for secular "cooperative education" in vocational subjects and rural development. Despite the lack of official relations between the two countries, unofficial relations were conducted through the auspices of the Chinese People's Association for Friendship with Foreign Countries and the New Zealand China Friendship Society (NZCFS). In addition, the Communist Party of New Zealand and some trade unions were sympathetic to the PRC rather than the Soviet Union.

In 1955 Warren Freer (then an opposition Labour MP) was the first Western politician to visit China, against the wishes of Labour leader Walter Nash but with the encouragement of Prime Minister Sidney Holland.

New Zealand photographer Brian Brake was given irregular access to China in 1957 and 1959, photographing Nikita Khrushchev's visit to the country, members of the PRC government like Chairman Mao Zedong, and scenes of life around the country at the time. Brake was the only Western photojournalist who documented the 10th anniversary of the People's Republic of China.

Prime Minister of New Zealand Keith Holyoake visited ROC President Chiang Kai-shek in 1960. Holyoake had a favourable view of the ROC and permitted the upgrading of the ROC consulate to full embassy status in 1962. However, New Zealand declined to establish any diplomatic or trading mission in Taiwan but opted to conduct its relations with the ROC through trade commissioners based in Tokyo and Hong Kong. As pressure for PRC representation at the United Nations grew, the New Zealand Government came to favour dual representation of both Chinese governments, but that was rejected by both the ROC and the PRC. In 1971, New Zealand and other US allies unsuccessfully opposed United Nations General Assembly Resolution 2758 to recognise the PRC as the "only legitimate representative of China to the UN."

=== People's Republic of China, 1971–present ===
In 1971, 78 countries invited Chinese table tennis teams to tour. New Zealand was the sixth nation whose invitation was accepted, for a tour in July 1972. The Chinese delegation arrived in Auckland, then flew to Wellington on 17 July, where they were met by protesters advising them to defect. They played in the Lower Hutt Town Hall. The following day an official afternoon tea reception was attended by the Prime Minister Jack Marshall, half the cabinet, Labour leader Norman Kirk, Wellington Mayor Frank Kitts, and Bryce Harland who was soon to be the first Ambassador to China. A tour followed, to the farm of former All Black Ken Gray at Pauatahanui, where they watched sheep shearing and sheep dogs.

On 22 December 1972 the newly elected Third Labour Government formally recognised the People's Republic of China, with the two governments signing a joint communique to govern bilateral relations. According to former New Zealand diplomat Gerald Hensley, Prime Minister Norman Kirk initially hesitated recognising the PRC until his second term but changed his mind because of the Ministry of Foreign Affairs. Kirk was influenced by his Australian counterpart Gough Whitlam's decision to recognise the PRC. In recognising the PRC, New Zealand adopted a One China policy, by which it acknowledges the PRC's One China principle, which is that there is one China, it is governed by the PRC, and Taiwan is part of its territory. New Zealand did not say it agreed with the principle, just that it acknowledges that the PRC government holds that position. Thus New Zealand adopted a policy of deliberate ambiguity over Taiwan.

Despite ending diplomatic relations with the ROC, the New Zealand Permanent Representative to the UN negotiated an agreement with his ROC counterpart Huang Hua for both countries to continue maintaining trade and other non-official contacts with Taiwan. The last ROC Ambassador to New Zealand was Konsin Shah, the dean of the diplomatic corps in Wellington.

In April 1973 Joe Walding became the first New Zealand government minister to visit China and met Premier Zhou Enlai. In return, Chinese Foreign Trade Minister Bai Xiangguo visited Wellington, seeking to sign a trade agreement in New Zealand. The same year, the PRC established an embassy in Wellington, and Pei Tsien-chang was appointed as the first Chinese ambassador to New Zealand. In September 1973, the New Zealand Embassy was established in Beijing with Bryce Harland serving as the first New Zealand Ambassador to China.

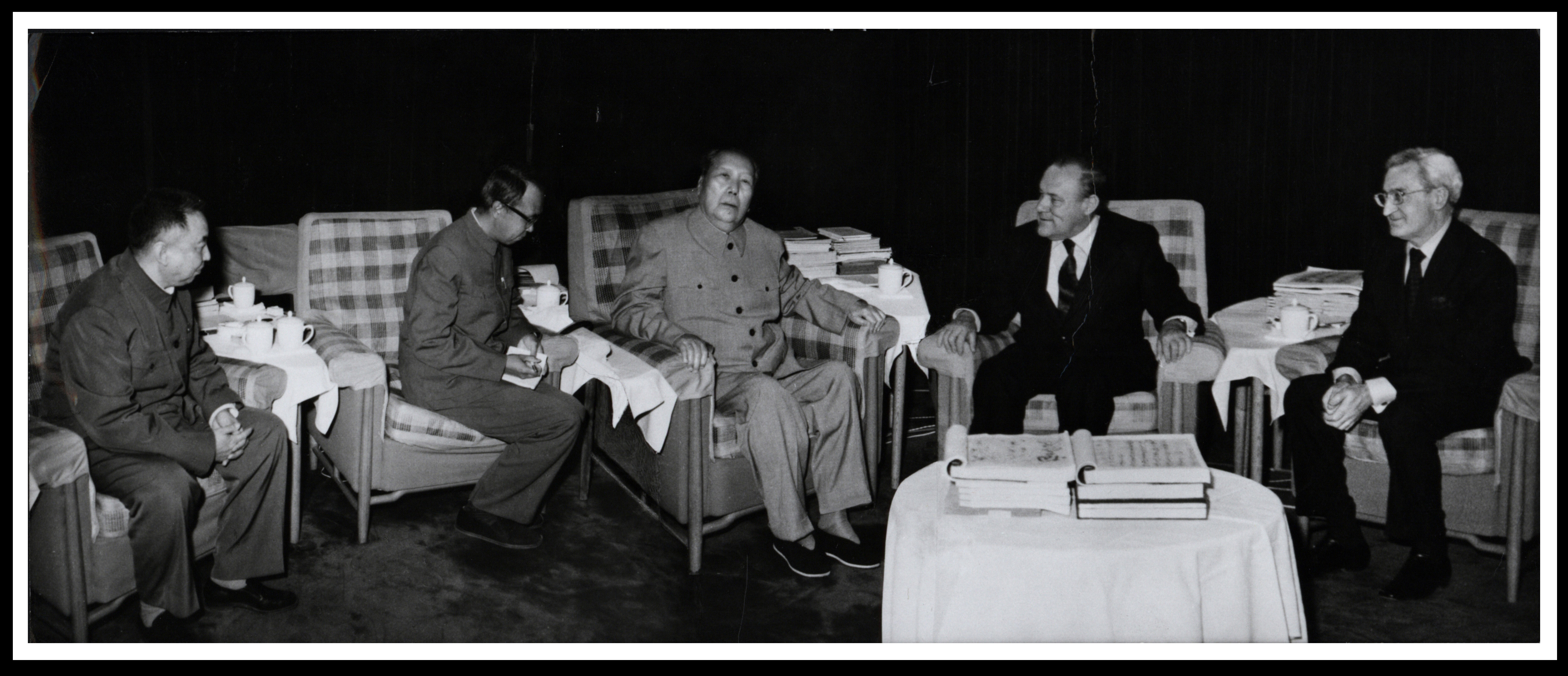
Robert Muldoon meeting Mao Zedong on a state visit to China in April 1976

Following the 1975 general election, the Third National Government abandoned National's support for the "Two Chinas policy" and expanded upon its Labour predecessors' diplomatic and trade relations with the PRC. In April–May 1976, Robert Muldoon became the first New Zealand Prime Minister to visit China. He visited Beijing and met with Premier Hua Guofeng and Mao, being one of the last foreign leaders to meet the chairman before he passed in July. Muldoon's visit served to strengthen diplomatic and trading ties between the two countries, and to reassure the New Zealand public that China did not pose a threat to New Zealand.

Since the end of the Cold War, bilateral relations between New Zealand and China have grown, particularly in the areas of trade, education, tourism, climate change, and public sector co-operation. Bilateral relations have been characterised by trade and economic co-operation. In August 1997, New Zealand became the first Western country to support China's accession to the World Trade Organization by concluding a bilateral agreement. In April 2004, New Zealand became the first country to recognise China as a market economy during a second round of trade negotiations. In November 2004, New Zealand and China launched negotiations towards a free trade agreement in November 2004, with the agreement being signed in April 2008. In November 2016, the two countries entered into negotiations to upgrade their free trade agreement.

In the mid-2020s, New Zealand began to increase defence spending and capabilities, which was recognised by observers to be driven by China's rapid military build-up and growing military exercises in the region. In November 2025 HMNZS Aotearoa transited the Taiwan Strait, with China objecting.

== Cultural and migration relations ==
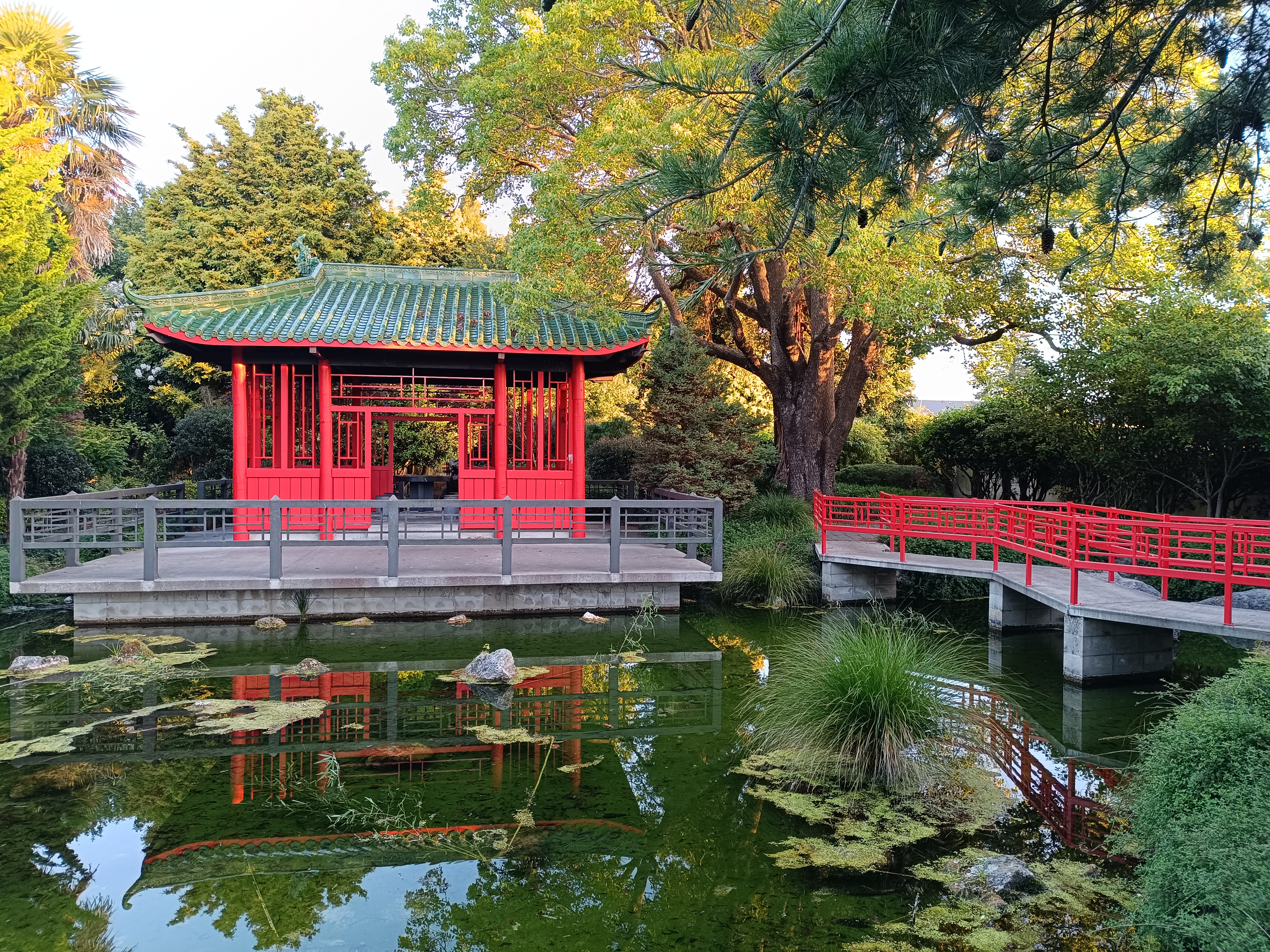
A Chinese garden constructed in Hastings to celebrate the city's friendship with its sister city Guilin

China and New Zealand have a long history of people-to-people contacts. During the 19th century, Chinese migrated to New Zealand to work as miners. Despite racial prejudice and anti-immigrant legislation, a small number settled to work as market gardeners, businessmen, and shopkeepers. Following World War II, official and public attitudes and policies towards Chinese migrants were relaxed and more Chinese women and children were allowed to settle. During the post-war years, the Chinese population in New Zealand increased, with many becoming middle-class professionals and businessmen.

In 1987, the New Zealand Government abandoned its long-standing preference for British and Irish immigrants in favour for a skills-based immigration policy. By 2013, the Chinese New Zealander population had increased to 171,411, comprising 4% of the country's population. Within this group, three-quarters were foreign-born and only one-quarter were locally-born. Of the foreign-born population, 51% came from China, 5% from Taiwan, and 4% from Hong Kong.

In addition, several New Zealand missionaries, businessmen, aid workers, and telegraph workers have lived and worked in China as long-term residents. One notable New Zealand expatriate in China was Rewi Alley, a New Zealand-born writer, educator, social reformer, potter, and member of the Chinese Communist Party (CCP). He lived and worked in China for 60 years until his death in 1987. He came to symbolise the important role of people to people contacts in building good relations and accentuating common ground between countries as different as New Zealand and China. In 1997, the 100th anniversary of Alley's birth was marked by celebrations in Beijing and New Zealand.

In an effort to build cultural relations between Maori and Chinese, New Zealand has increasingly utilised a "taniwha and dragon" framework. In 2013, the Taniwha and Dragon Festival, organised in part by the minister of Māori affairs, Pita Sharples, was held at Orakei Marae in Auckland to commemorate historical interactions between Māori and Chinese migrants in New Zealand. Later, it was used to connect iwi businesses with Chinese counterparts, such as the 'Taniwha Dragon' economic summit that was held in the city of Hastings in 2017. More recently, it has been used by New Zealand's foreign minister, Nanaia Mahuta, to conceptutalise Sino-New Zealand relations more broadly.

In mid-June 2024, China agreed to extend visa-free travel to New Zealanders during a state visit by Chinese Premier Li Qiang. In return, New Zealand agreed to support Chinese language training and cultural exchange programmes provided by local Confucius Institutes.

On 15 June 2025, Prime Minister Christopher Luxon and Immigration Minister Erica Stanford announced that the New Zealand Government would be launching a three-month visa waiver trial for Chinese citizens with valid Australian visitor, work, family or student visas from November 2025. On 18 June, Stanford followed up with an announcement that Chinese nationals would no longer need to apply for transit visas from November 2025 and would be eligible to apply for the New Zealand Electronic Travel Authority (NZETA). On 27 October, Chinese visitors transiting through New Zealand became eligible for the NZETA visa scheme. From 3 November, Chinese nationals travelling from Australia to New Zealand also became eligible for the NZETA visa.

== Economic relations ==
=== Trade ===
Countries that signed cooperation documents related to the Belt and Road Initiative

In 1972, New Zealand's trade relations with mainland China were paltry with NZ exports to China estimated to being less than NZ$2 million per annum. Early New Zealand exports to China included timber, pulp and paper while early Chinese exports to NZ were high-quality printing paper and chemicals. Over the successive decades, trade between the two countries grew. In terms of the Chinese share of New Zealand trade, New Zealand's exports to China rose from about 2% in 1981 to about 4.9% in 1988. In 1990, it dropped to 1% due to the fallout from the 1989 Tiananmen Square protests and massacre. By 2001, NZ exports to China accounted for 7% of China's New Zealand's overseas trade. Meanwhile, New Zealand imports to China rose from below 1% of New Zealand's trade volume in 1981 to 7% by 2001.

Mainland China (i.e. excluding Hong Kong and Macau) is New Zealand's largest trading partner, with bilateral trade between the two countries in 2023 valued at NZ$37.9 billion. Hong Kong SAR is New Zealand's 13th-largest trading partner, with bilateral trade of NZ$2.1 billion.

New Zealand's main exports to China are dairy products, travel and tourism, wood and wood products, meat, fish and seafood, and fruit. China's main exports to New Zealand are electronics, machinery, textiles, furniture, and plastics.

=== Free trade agreement ===
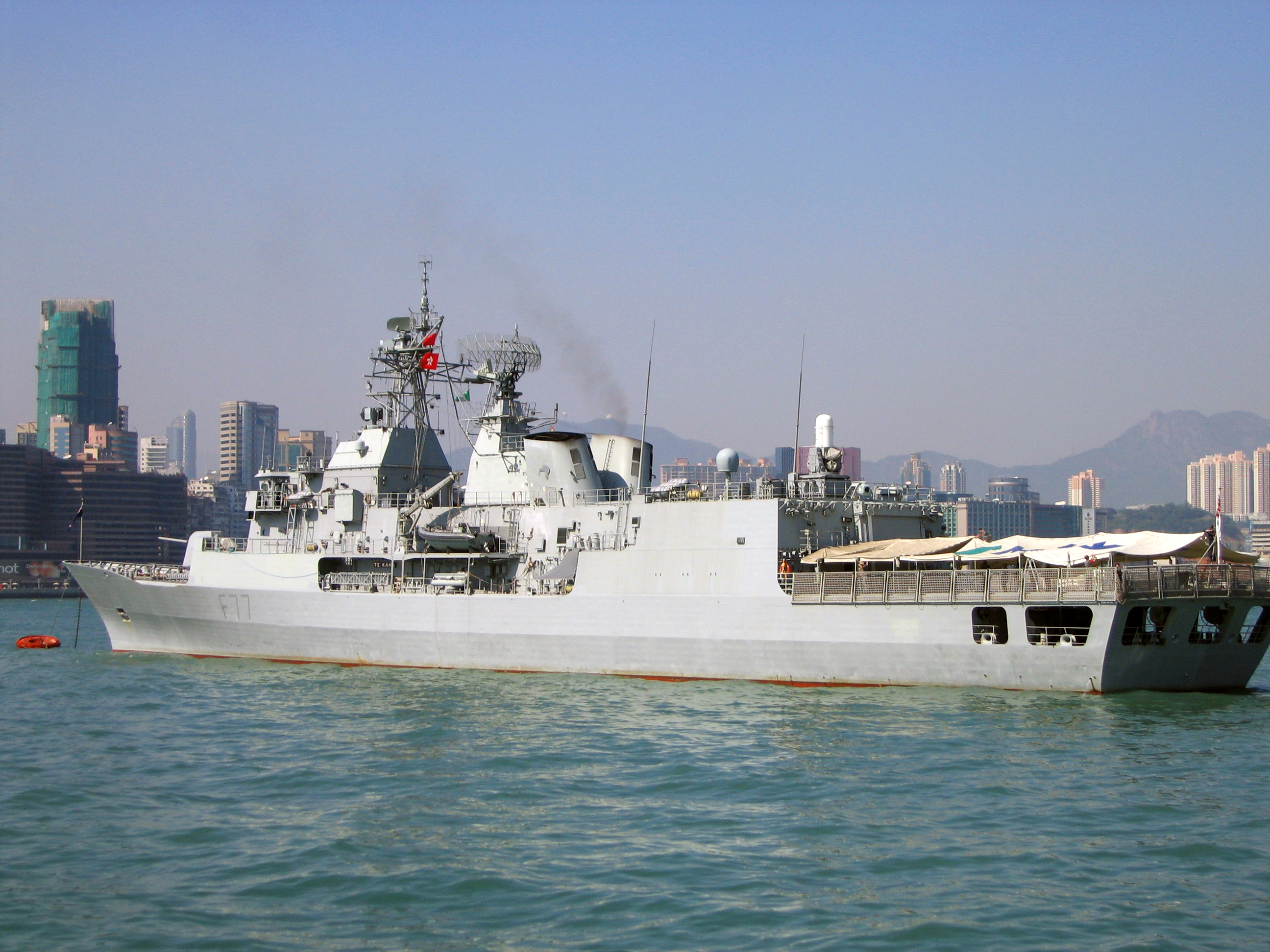
HMNZS Te Kaha docked in Victoria Harbour, Hong Kong, China, in 2004

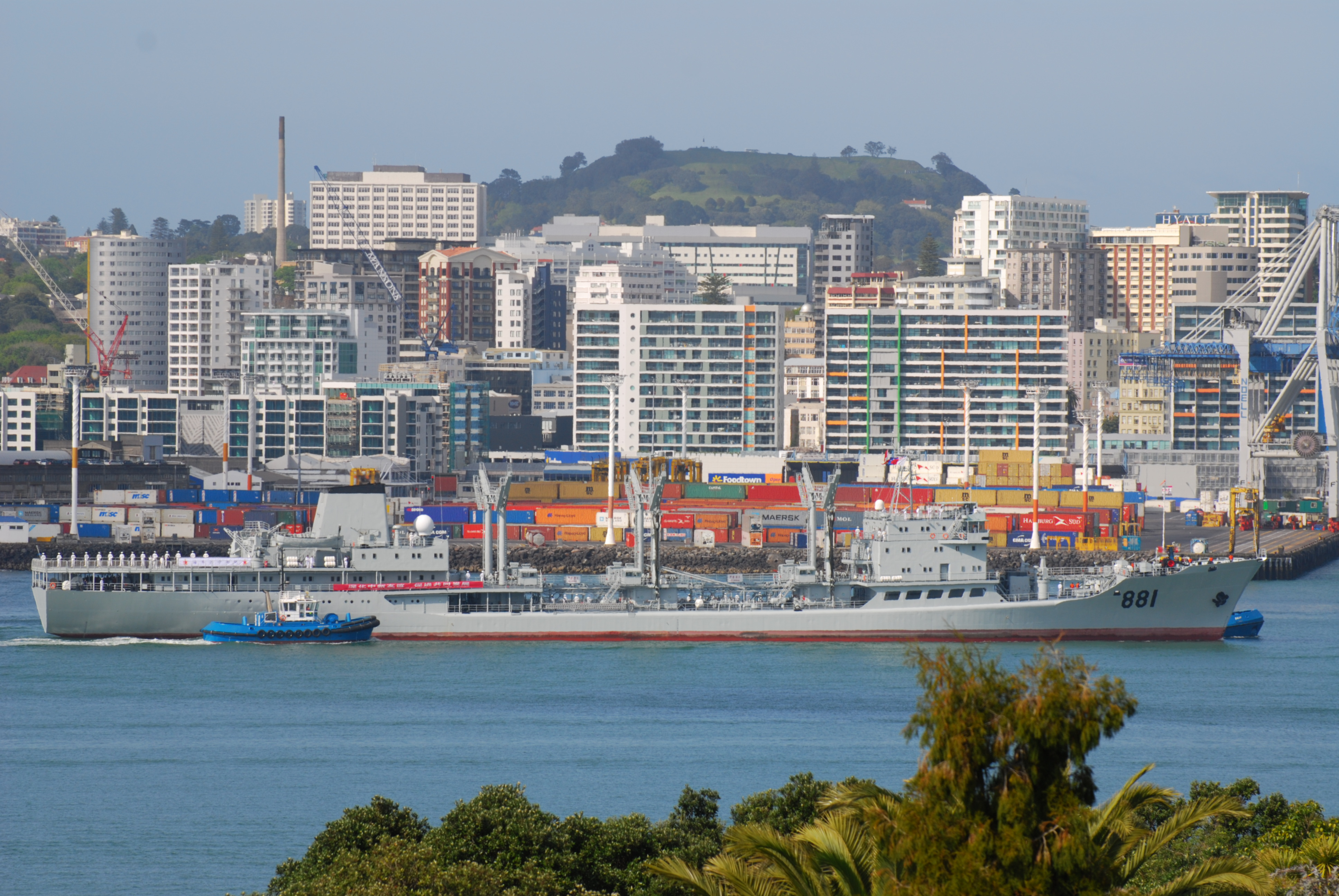
Chinese Navy ship in Auckland, New Zealand

A free trade agreement (FTA) between China and New Zealand was signed on 7 April 2008 by Premier of China Wen Jiabao and Prime Minister of New Zealand Helen Clark in Beijing. Under the agreement, about one third of New Zealand exports to China will be free of tariffs from 1 October 2008, with another third becoming tariff free by 2013, and all but 4% by 2019. In return, 60% of China's exports to New Zealand will become tariff free by 2016 or earlier; more than a third are already duty-free. Investment, migration, and trade in services will also be facilitated.

The free trade agreement with China is New Zealand's most significant since the Closer Economic Relations agreement with Australia was signed in 1983. It was also the first time China has entered into a comprehensive free trade agreement with a developed country.

The agreement took more than three years to negotiate. On 19 November 2004 Helen Clark and President of China, Hu Jintao announced the commencement of negotiations towards an FTA at the APEC Leaders meeting in Santiago, Chile. The first round of negotiations was held in December 2004. Fifteen rounds took place before the FTA was signed in April 2008.

While the FTA enjoys the support of New Zealand's two largest political parties, Labour and National, other parties such as the Green Party and the Māori Party opposed the agreement at the time. Winston Peters was also a vocal opponent of the agreement, but agreed not to criticise it while acting as Minister of Foreign Affairs overseas (a position he held from 2005 to 2008).

New Zealand joined the Belt and Road Initiative (BRI) in 2017. In early November 2019, New Zealand and China agreed to upgrade their free trade agreement. China has eased restrictions on New Zealand exports and given New Zealand preferential access to the wood and paper trade with China. In return, New Zealand agree to lessen visa restrictions for Chinese tour guides and Chinese language teachers.

On 26 January 2021, New Zealand and China signed a deal to upgrade their free trade agreement to give New Zealand exports greater access to the Chinese market, eliminating or reducing tariffs on New Zealand exports such as dairy, timber, and seafood as well as compliance costs.

On 1 January 2024, China lifted all tariffs on New Zealand dairy imports including milk powder as part of the NZ-China free trade agreement. This development was welcomed by Minister of Trade and Agriculture Todd McClay, who said that it would bring NZ$330 million worth of revenue to the New Zealand economy.

=== Film cooperation ===
In May 2015, The Hollywood Reporter reported that several Chinese, New Zealand, and Canadian film companies including the China Film Group, the Qi Tai Culture Development Group, New Zealand's Huhu Studios, and the Canadian Stratagem Entertainment had entered into a US$800 million agreement to produce 17 live-action and animated films over the next six to eight years. As part of the agreement, the China Film Group's animation division China Film Animation would be working with Huhu Studios to produce an animated film called Beast of Burden with a US$20 million budget. This partnership between Huhu Studios and China Film Animation was the first official New Zealand–Chinese film co-production agreement. The film was subsequently released as Mosley on 10 October 2019.

== Education relations and scientific cooperation ==
China and New Zealand have a history of education links and exchanges, including bilateral scholarship programmes and academic cooperation. There was a dramatic expansion in student flows and other engagement in the late 1990s. During the 1990s, the number of Chinese nationals studying at public tertiary institutions in New Zealand rose from 49 in 1994, 89 in 1998, 457 in 1999, 1,696 in 2000, 5,236 in 2001, and 11,700 in 2002. The percentage of full fee paying Asian students from China at public tertiary institutions also rose from 1.5% in 1994 to 56.3% by 2002. The increase in Chinese international students in New Zealand accompanied the increase in the percentage of international students at New Zealand universities and polytechnics.

Between 2003 and 2011, the number of Chinese students studying in New Zealand dropped from 56,000 to about 30,000 by 2011. In 2003, Chinese students accounted for 46% of all international students in New Zealand. By 2011, this figure had dropped to 25%. As of 2017, China was the largest source of international students in New Zealand. In 2017, there were over 40,000 Chinese student enrolments in New Zealand.

In 2019 Chinese Vice Consul General Xiao Yewen intervened at Auckland University of Technology in relation to an event marking the 30th Anniversary of the Tiananmen Square massacre. AUT cancelled the booking for the event and it went ahead at a council-owned facility.

In mid-February 2025, the Otago Daily Times reported that the National Institute of Water and Atmospheric Research (NIWA) and the Chinese Institute of Deep Sea Science and Engineering were collaborating in deep sea marine exploration in the Puysegur Trench, which lies off the south-west coast of Fiordland in the south Tasman Sea.

== Resident diplomatic missions ==
of China in New Zealand

- Wellington (Embassy)
- Auckland (Consulate-General)
- Christchurch (Consulate-General)

of New Zealand in China

- Beijing (Embassy)
- Guangzhou (Consulate-General)
- Hong Kong (Consulate-General)
- Shanghai (Consulate-General)

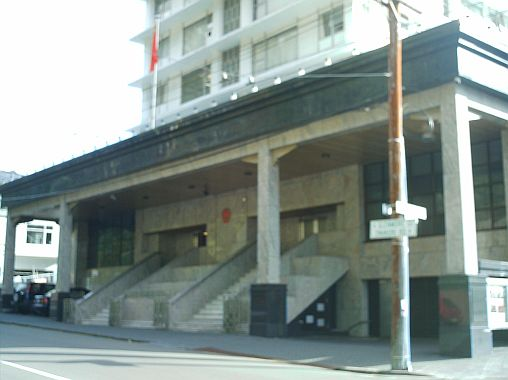
Embassy of China in Wellington

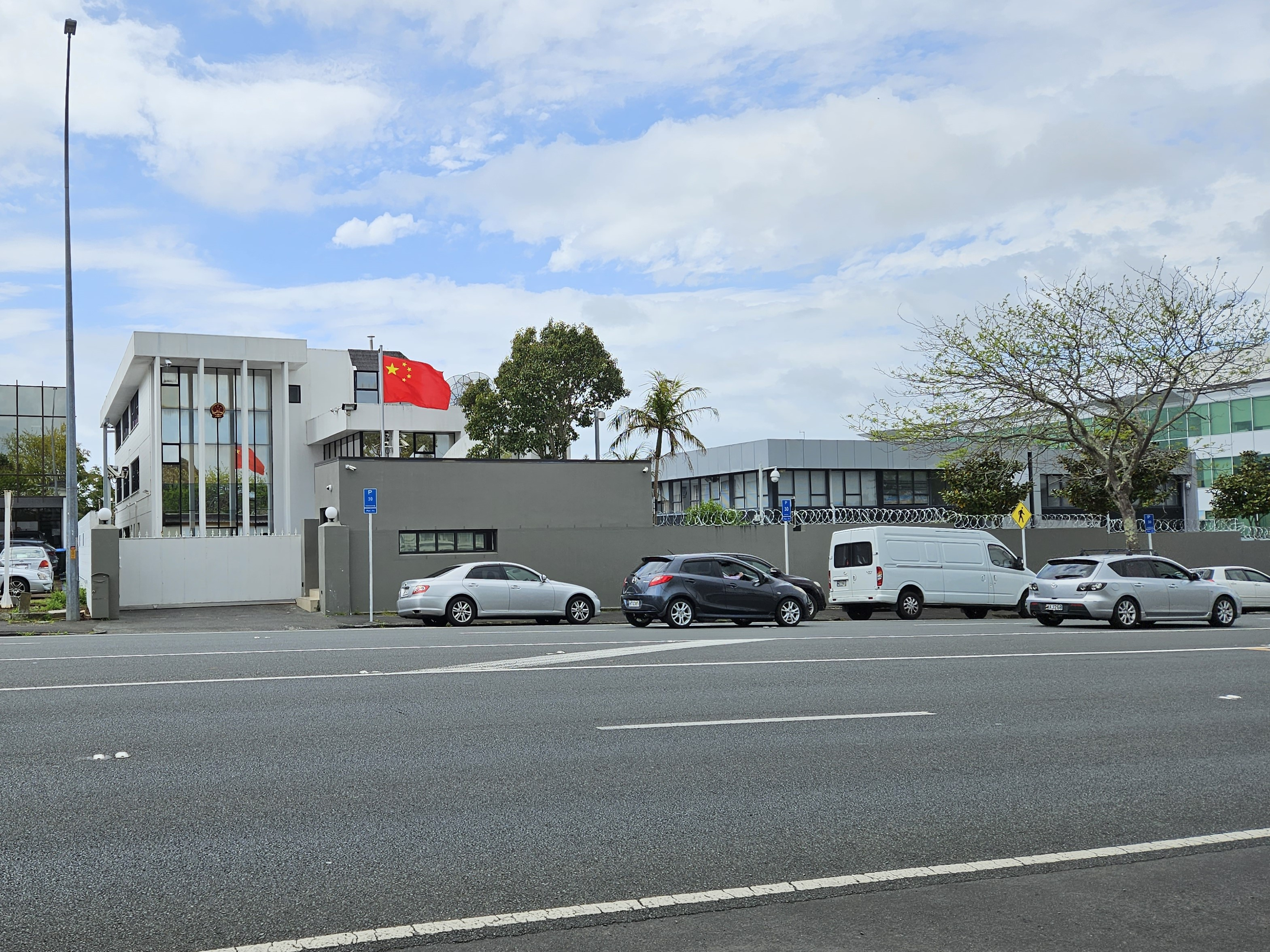
Consulate-General of China in Auckland

== Diplomatic relations ==
=== Hong Kong ===
In addition to its diplomatic relations with mainland of China, New Zealand also maintains diplomatic and economic relations with the Hong Kong Special Administrative Region. In March 2010, New Zealand and Hong Kong entered into a bilateral economic partnership agreement. New Zealand maintains a Consulate-General in Hong Kong, which is also accredited to the Macau SAR. Hong Kong's interests in New Zealand are represented by the Chinese Embassy in Wellington and the Hong Kong Economic and Trade Office in Sydney.

=== Republic of China (Taiwan) ===
Though New Zealand no longer has diplomatic relations with Taiwan, New Zealand still maintains trade, economic, and cultural relations with Taiwan. Taiwan has two Economic and Cultural offices in Auckland and Wellington. New Zealand also has a Commerce and Industry Office in Taipei.

== State visits ==
=== Chinese tours by New Zealand delegates and ministers ===
New Zealand ministerial visits to the People's Republic of China:

Dates	Minister/Delegate	Cities visited	Reason
17–20 June 2025	Prime Minister Christopher Luxon, Tourism Minister Louise Upston and cabinet minister Mark Mitchell	Shanghai, Beijing	Led a business delegation that signed business deals with their Chinese counterparts. Luxon visited Fudan University to promote educational ties and met with Party Secretary of Shanghai Chen Jining to discuss bilateral trade. On 20 June, Luxon and the New Zealand delegation met President Xi Jinping and Chinese Premier Li Qiang to discuss trade and other bilateral and global issues.
26 February 2025	Minister of Foreign Affairs, Winston Peters	Beijing	Peters met with Chinese Foreign Minister Wang Yi to raise New Zealand's concerns about ongoing Chinese naval exercises in the Tasman Sea and China's strategic partnership agreement with the Cook Islands.
25–30 June 2023	Prime Minister, Rt Hon Chris Hipkins	Beijing, Tianjin, Shanghai	Hipkins led a trade delegation and met with Chinese President Xi Jinping and Premier Li Qiang.
Late March 2023	Minister of Foreign Affairs, Nanaia Mahuta	Beijing	Met with Chinese Foreign Minister Qin Gang to discuss issues of bilateral concern to both countries.
1 April 2019	Prime Minister, Rt Hon Jacinda Ardern	Beijing	Ardern met with Chinese President Xi Jinping and Premier Li Keqiang and opened the new Embassy of New Zealand building.
24–27 May 2018	Minister of Foreign Affairs, Winston Peters	Beijing	Ministerial visit
April 2008	Prime Minister, Rt Hon Helen Clark	Beijing	Official visit
November 2007	Minister of Foreign Affairs, Winston Peters		Official visit
September 2007	Deputy Prime Minister, Dr Michael Cullen		Official visit
August 2007	Minister of Customs and Youth Affairs, Nanaia Mahuta		Official visit
July 2007	Minister of State, Dover Samuels		Official visit
May 2007	Minister of Foreign Affairs, Winston Peters		Official visit
April 2007	Minister of Civil Aviation; Minister of Police, Annette King		Official visit
March 2007	Minister of Communications & IT, David Cunliffe		Official visit
December 2006	Minister of Food Safety & Minister of Police, Annette King		Official visit
November 2006	Minister for Trade Negotiations & Minister of Defence, Phil Goff		Official visit
November 2006	Minister of Tourism, Damien O'Connor		Official visit
April 2006	Minister of State, Jim Sutton	Beijing	Official visit
July 2005	Minister for Trade Negotiations, Jim Sutton	Beijing	Official visit
June 2005	Minister for Trade Negotiations, Jim Sutton	Beijing	Official visit
May 2005	Prime Minister of New Zealand, Rt Hon Helen Clark	Beijing	Official visit
February 2005	Minister of Foreign Affairs and Trade, Phil Goff	Beijing	Official visit
September 2004	Minister of Health, Annette King	Beijing	Official visit
August 2004	Minister for Research, Science and Technology, Pete Hodgson	Various	Official visit
February 2004	Minister for Trade Negotiations, Minister of Agriculture, Minister of Forestry, Jim Sutton	Various	Official visit
September 2003	Speaker of the House of Representatives, Jonathan Hunt	Beijing	Led a parliamentary delegation to China
September 2003	Minister of Foreign Affairs and Trade, Phil Goff	Beijing	Official visit
September 2003	Minister of Education, Trevor Mallard	Various	Official visit
December 2002	Minister for Trade Negotiations, Minister of Agriculture, Minister of Forestry, Jim Sutton	Various	Official visit
May 2002	Minister of Education, Trevor Mallard	Various	Official visit
April 2002	Graham Kelly and four other MPs	Tibet	Official visit
March 2002	Minister for Trade Negotiations, Minister of Agriculture, Minister of Forestry, Jim Sutton	Various	Official visit
October 2001	Prime Minister of New Zealand, Rt Hon Helen Clark	Beijing	Official visit
April 2001	Prime Minister of New Zealand, Rt Hon Helen Clark	Beijing	Official visit
November–December 2000	Governor-General of New Zealand, Sir Michael Hardie Boys	Beijing	Official visit
July 1999	Prime Minister of New Zealand, Rt Hon Jenny Shipley	Beijing	Official visit

=== New Zealand tours by Chinese delegates and ministers ===
Chinese dancers welcome the new year in Dunedin

Chinese ministerial visits to New Zealand:

==== President ====
Dates	Minister/Delegate	Cities visited	Reason	Ref.
November 2014	President of the People's Republic of China, Xi Jinping	Auckland and Wellington	Official visit	
October 2003	President of the People's Republic of China, Hu Jintao	Wellington	Official visit	
September 1999	President of the People's Republic of China, Jiang Zemin	Wellington	Official visit	

==== Other top leaders ====
Dates	Minister/Delegate	Cities visited	Reason	Ref.
November 2025	Chairman of the National People's Congress Standing Committee Zhao Leji	Wellington	Official visit	
June 2024	Premier Li Qiang	Wellington	Official visit	
April 2006	Premier Wen Jiabao	Various	Official visit	
May 2005	Chairman of the National People's Congress Standing Committee Wu Bangguo	Wellington	Official visit	
February 2004	Member of the Politburo Standing Committee, He Guoqiang	Wellington	Official visit	
November 2003	Member of the Politburo Standing Committee, Zhang Dejiang	Wellington	Official visit	
July 2003	Member of the Politburo Standing Committee, Li Changchun	Wellington	Official visit	
April 2002	Member of the Politburo Standing Committee, Wu Guanzheng	Wellington	Official visit	
May 2001	Member of the Politburo Standing Committee, Jia Qinglin	Wellington	Official visit	
March 2000	Member of the Politburo Standing Committee, Zeng Qinghong	Wellington	Official visit	

==== State Council ====
Dates	Minister/Delegate	Cities visited	Reason
January 2006	Secretary-General, Hua Jianmin	Wellington	Official visit
September 2006	Member of the Central Military Commission, Vice-chairman, Xu Caihou	Wellington	Official visit
April 2001	Member of the Central Military Commission, Vice-chairman, Zhang Wannian	Wellington	Official visit

==== Ministers ====
Dates	Minister/Delegate	Cities visited	Reason
March 2024	Minister of Foreign Affairs, Wang Yi	Wellington	Official visit
April 2006	Minister of Foreign Affairs, Li Zhaoxing	Wellington	Official visit
April 2006	Minister of Commerce, Bo Xilai	Wellington	Official visit
April 2006	Minister of the National Development and Reform Commission, Ma Kai	Wellington	Official visit
February 2006	Minister of Science and Technology, Xu Guanhua	Wellington	Official visit
November 2004	Chief of General Staff, People's Liberation Army, General Liang Guanglie	Various	Official visit
May 2004	Minister of Commerce, Bo Xilai	Wellington	Official visit
October 2003	Minister of the National Development and Reform Commission, Ma Kai	Wellington	Official visit
October 2003	Minister, General Administration of Quality Supervision, Inspection and Quarantine (AQSIQ), Li Changjiang	Wellington	Official visit
October 2003	Minister of Foreign Affairs, Li Zhaoxing	Wellington	Official visit
July 2003	Minister of Culture, Sun Jiazheng	Various	Official visit
March 2002	Minister of Foreign Affairs, Tang Jiaxuan	Wellington	Official visit
September 2001	Minister of Justice, Zhang Fusen	Wellington	Official visit
September 1999	Minister of Foreign Affairs, Tang Jiaxuan	Wellington	Official visit

== Controversies and disputes ==
China–New Zealand relations have not been without discord. The crackdown by the Chinese Government on the Tiananmen Square demonstrations of June 1989 was strongly condemned in New Zealand and official ministerial contact was suspended for more than a year. Other disagreements between Wellington and Beijing have included the suppression of political liberties, Chinese militarisation, the sale of weapons and nuclear technology to Middle Eastern countries, Chinese nuclear testing, and Chinese policies towards Taiwan, Tibet, and the Uyghur Muslim minority in China's Xinjiang province.

=== Influence operations and espionage ===
In September 2017, the University of Canterbury political scientist and China expert Dr Anne-Marie Brady presented a conference paper entitled "Magic Weapons: China's political influence activities under Xi Jinping" alleging that the Chinese Government was using local Chinese community organisations and ethnic media as part of a "united front" strategy and the One Belt One Road initiative to advance Chinese soft power influence in New Zealand. Alleged Chinese activities have included using "united front" organisations to promote support for Beijing among the Chinese New Zealand community, monitoring Chinese students academics, cultivating relations with New Zealand's political and business elites, and encouraging Chinese diaspora participation in New Zealand politics. Key "united front" organisations have included the New Zealand China Friendship Society, Peaceful Reunification of China Association of New Zealand (PRCANZ), the New Zealand Overseas Chinese Service Centre, and local branches of the Chinese Students and Scholars Association.

According to Brady's research, Chinese state agencies like the Xinhua News Agency had forged cooperation agreements with several NZ Chinese media outlets including the Chinese Herald, FM 90.6, Panda TV, Channel 37, Chinese Times, Kiwi Style, SkyKiwi, World TV, and NCTV, bringing them in line with Beijing's agenda. Brady also raised concerns about Chinese united front efforts to cultivate the support of politicians from the New Zealand National, Labour, and ACT parties including National Member of Parliament Jian Yang, Labour candidate Raymond Huo, and ACT candidate Kenneth Wang. Brady's paper suggested that Yang had once been a Chinese intelligence officer since he had taught at the People's Liberation Army's Air Force Engineering University and Luoyang PLA University of Foreign Language. In addition, Brady's paper noted that several former National MPs and ministers including Ruth Richardson, Chris Tremain, Don Brash, and former Prime Minister Jenny Shipley had joined the boards of several Chinese banks.

Brady's paper coincided with the 2017 New Zealand general election and attracted substantial attention from New Zealand politicians, commentators and the media. The-then Prime Minister Bill English said he had no concerns about the issues raised by the report while Labour leader Jacinda Ardern said that she did not see a need to follow Australia's lead in scrutinising Chinese influence in domestic affairs but vowed to look at the issue further. Don Brash, who was named in the report for his co-directorship of the Industrial Bank of China in New Zealand, stated that China was no different than other great powers in wanting to extend its influence and cultivate allies. Huo, who was named in the report, stated "that there was a fine line between what Brady has alleged and the genuine promotion of the NZ-China relationship." Former Prime Minister Helen Clark responded that New Zealand should engage with major powers in the Asia-Pacific region but "should not be naive in its interaction with them." Shipley denied being a "mouthpiece" of the Chinese government.

Following a 2024 documentary about Chinese government interference in New Zealand by Stuff, the Chinese embassy issued a statement warning New Zealand that further investigative journalism on the issue could "harm" the country.

=== Huawei 5G ban ===
In late November 2018, the New Zealand Government banned the Chinese telecommunications company Huawei from supplying mobile equipment to national telecommunications company Spark New Zealand's 5G network. This was done at the advice of NZ's signals intelligence agency, the Government Communications Security Bureau, which cited a "significant network security risk." The New Zealand ban was linked to similar efforts by other Western governments, including the United States, the United Kingdom, and Australia, to restrict the usage of Huawei products and services in their 5G networks as well as the ongoing China-United States trade war. GCSB Minister Andrew Little defended the ban, citing China's National Intelligence Law, which compels Chinese corporates and citizens to co-operate and collaborate with Chinese intelligence.

Huawei New Zealand managing director Yanek Fan criticised the New Zealand Government for treating the company unfairly, while telecommunications provider 2degrees criticised the ban for harming competition. Chinese Foreign Ministry spokesperson Geng Shuan called on New Zealand to provide a level playing field for Chinese companies. Meanwhile, the CCP-owned tabloid Global Times warned that the Huawei ban would hurt New Zealand's industry and consumers.

In early 2019, various New Zealand media speculated that the Chinese cancellation of the 2019 New Zealand-China Year of Tourism event at Te Papa Museum in Wellington and the decision to deny an Air New Zealand flight landing rights were connected to the Huawei ban. Air New Zealand Flight NZ289 had initially been denied landing rights due to references in the flight plan to Taiwan as an independent state, something at odds with the One China policy. In response to reportage, Prime Minister Jacinda Ardern denied that there had been a breakdown in China–New Zealand relations and said that the denial of the Air New Zealand flight landing rights was the result of administrative errors. Opposition Leader Simon Bridges has criticised the Labour-led coalition government for allegedly damaging China–New Zealand relations. According to clarification posts in Weibo, the plane was never registered in the CCAR part 125 required by Civil Aviation Administration of China, and landing without that registration will result in loss of points, affecting their operations in China. The particular plane registered as ZK-NZQ had a cabin configuration that was not usually used on flights to mainland China, and had never before been to mainland China in its five months of service.

During a press conference held in mid-February 2019, Chinese Foreign Ministry Spokesperson Geng Shuang denied that there was a breakdown in bilateral relations in response to the cancellation of the 2019 China-New Zealand Year of Tourism event and Chinese media reports discouraging Chinese tourists from visiting New Zealand. He clarified that the Chinese Embassy and consulate generals in New Zealand had issued statements advising their nationals to take precautions against theft and robbery while visiting New Zealand. Shuang characterised the Chinese-New Zealand relationship as "sound and steady."

In mid-July 2020, GCSB Minister Little confirmed that New Zealand would not ban Huawei equipment in response to similar decisions by the British and United States governments to exclude Huawei from their 5G networks on national security grounds. Telecommunications Users Association chief executive Craig Young welcomed the Government's announcement, saying that a ban would force companies with Huawei equipment to replace expensive equipment due to the integrated nature of the country's 2G, 3G and 4G networks. In response to the Government's announcement, Huawei NZ's deputy managing director Andrew Bowater emphasised the company's commitment to helping customers deal with the effects of the COVID-19 pandemic in New Zealand.

=== China's Xinjiang policies ===
In July 2019, the UN ambassadors from 22 nations, including New Zealand, signed a joint letter to the UNHRC condemning China's mistreatment of the Uyghurs as well as its mistreatment of other minority groups, urging the Chinese government to close the Xinjiang re-education camps.

On 20 July, Prime Minister Jacinda Ardern criticised China's treatment of Uyghurs, the new Hong Kong national security law, and Chinese opposition to Taiwanese membership of the World Health Organization while addressing the China Business Summit in Auckland. In response, Chinese Ambassador Wu Xi warned New Zealand not to interfere in Chinese internal affairs, stating that "we should not take our relationship for granted and... should make sure that our bilateral relations are immune from various virus in these trying times."

In late April 2021, the libertarian ACT party sponsored motion asking the New Zealand Parliament to debate and vote on whether China's alleged oppression of the Uyghur minority constituted a genocide. This motion was supported by the Green Party and the Māori Party. In response, Minister of Trade Damien O'Connor warned that the Uyghur genocide motion could have significant repercussions for China–New Zealand relations. The Chinese Ambassador Wu Xi also issued a statement warning against foreign interference and dismissed talk of forced labour and genocide as "lies" fabricated by anti-China elements.

On 4 May, the ruling Labour Party successfully revised the motion to discuss concerns about human rights abuses in Xinjiang while omitting the term genocide. On 5 May, the New Zealand Parliament unanimously accepted a motion stating that "severe human rights abuses" were happening in Xinjiang and called on the Government "to work with all relevant instruments of international law to bring these abuses to an end." On 5 May, the Chinese Embassy issued a statement claiming that the motion was based on a "groundless accusation on China over human rights abuse" and interfered in Chinese internal affairs.

=== 2019 Hong Kong protests ===
In early August 2019, the New Zealand government rebuked Chinese diplomats over recent comments and actions in which they sought to suppress freedom of speech and voiced support for violent opposition to Hong Kong protestors in New Zealand. Earlier, the Chinese Consulate-General in Auckland had praised the "patriotic actions" of Chinese students who had confronted a group of pro-Hong Kong democracy student activists at the University of Auckland. The Hong Kong student activists had set up a Lennon Wall to express solidarity with the 2019–20 Hong Kong protests. One of the Chinese students had reportedly assaulted a Hong Kong student during an altercation at the university in late July 2019. Ministry of Foreign Affairs and Trade officials cautioned Chinese officials about their interference in New Zealand affairs, and Prime Minister Ardern reiterated New Zealand's commitment to free speech on university campuses. ACT Party leader David Seymour also sent a letter to the Consulate-General criticising it for interfering in New Zealand internal affairs.

In response, Chinese Foreign Ministry spokesperson Hua Chunying defended the actions of Chinese international students and the Consulate-General in Auckland, blaming "Hong Kong independence" activists for stirring up anti-China sentiments at the University of Auckland. While sympathising with the patriotic feelings of Chinese students, Hua reminded Chinese students to abide by New Zealand law and the regulations of their university. Hua also defended the actions of the Consulate-General as "fulfilling its duty" and "beyond reproach." She also called on certain New Zealanders to stop condoning "anti-China separatist activities" under the guise of free speech. Hua also defended the response of the Chinese Consulate-General in Brisbane following similar clashes between pro-Hong Kong and pro-China students at the University of Queensland.

=== Taiwan ===
Since 1973, New Zealand and Taiwan have maintained unofficial trade and economic relations in accordance with the One China policy. In early May 2020, Foreign Minister Winston Peters expressed support for Taiwan rejoining the World Health Organization during a press conference. Taiwan has been excluded from the international organisation due to the PRC's One China principle. The Taiwanese Government welcomed Peter's remarks, while the Chinese Embassy objected to them, reiterating that New Zealand should abide by the One China principle. The New Zealand Government subsequently backed Taiwan's bid to join the WHO, placing New Zealand alongside Australia and the United States, who took similar positions during the COVID-19 pandemic.

On 12 May 2020 Chinese Foreign Ministry spokesperson Zhao Lijian responded by warning that Peters' remarks violated the One China principle and would hurt bilateral relations between the two countries. He claimed that Beijing had made proper arrangements for Taiwan's participation in global health events and accused Taipei of exploiting the COVID-19 pandemic to seek Taiwanese independence. Peters stood by his remarks.

In mid-April 2025 a cross-party delegation of New Zealand members of Parliament visited Taiwan. The delegation consisted of National Party MPs Stuart Smith, Greg Fleming and Hamish Campbell, New Zealand First MP Jamie Arbuckle, ACT MP Cameron Luxton and Labour Party MPs Tangi Utikere and Helen White. They met with Taiwanese President Lai Ching-Te, who issued a statement thanking the New Zealand Government, "reiterating the importance of peace and stability across the Taiwan Strait." On 24 April 2025 the Chinese Embassy in New Zealand issued a statement expressing "strong dissatisfaction" with the visit and accusing the participants of "colluding with 'Taiwan independence' separatist forces during their trip." The Embassy warned that China "reserved the right to take further measures in response to the visit." In November 2025 HMNZS Aotearoa transited the Taiwan Strait, followed by Chinese naval forces.

In June 2026, China banned four New Zealand lawmakers–Maureen Pugh, David Wilson, Laura McClure and Duncan Webb–from entering the country for one year after they visited Taiwan in May. New Zealand and Taiwan criticised the move, with McClure and Webb defending their actions. The Chinese Foreign Ministry said their visit to Taiwan violated the One China policy and amounted to foreign interference in China's internal affairs. New Zealand Prime Minister Christopher Luxon described the ban on the four lawmakers as "entirely inappropriate" and said that the NZ government would raise the matter with their Chinese counterparts.

=== Hong Kong national security law, 2020 ===
On 9 July, Foreign Minister Winston Peters announced that New Zealand would review "the setting of its relationship" with Hong Kong in response to the introduction of the Hong Kong national security law earlier that month. On 28 July, New Zealand suspended its extradition treaty with Hong Kong, with Foreign Minister Peters stating that the new law "eroded rule-of-law principles" and undermined the "one country, two systems" rule. Prime Minister Ardern also criticised the new law for violating New Zealand's principles of freedom of association and the right to take a political view. In response, the Chinese Embassy criticised the New Zealand Government for violating international law and norms, and interfering in China's internal affairs. On 3 August, China suspended its extradition agreement with New Zealand in retaliation to NZ's suspension of its extradition agreement with Hong Kong. In response, Foreign Minister Peters' office countered that New Zealand lacked an extradition agreement with China.

On 6 October, New Zealand joined a group of 39 mainly US-aligned countries alongside Albania, Bosnia-Herzegovina, Canada, Haiti Honduras, and Japan in issuing a joint statement at the United Nations to denounce China for its treatment of ethnic minorities and for curtailing freedoms in Hong Kong.

On 18 November, the New Zealand Foreign Minister Nanaia Mahuta joined her Australian, Canadian, British and United States counterparts in issuing a joint statement condemning the disqualification of pro-democracy legislators as a breach of Hong Kong's autonomy and rights under the framework of the Sino-British Joint Declaration. In response, the Chinese Foreign Ministry's spokesperson Zhao Lijian issued a warning to the Five Eyes countries, stating that "No matter if they have five eyes or 10 eyes, if they dare to harm China's sovereignty, security and development interests, they should beware of their eyes being poked and blinded." In response, Mahuta defended New Zealand's commitment to free speech, free media, and democracy.

=== Brereton Report ===
On 1 December 2020, Prime Minister Ardern expressed concern about a doctored Chinese Foreign Ministry official Zhao Lijian's Twitter post showing an Australian soldier holding a bloodied knife against the throat of an Afghan child, describing the post as "un-factual." Foreign Minister Nanaia Mahuta had also described the tweet as "inflammatory disinformation" and conveyed New Zealand's concerns to Beijing. The Australian Government had earlier condemned the tweet as "offensive" and "outrageous" and demanded an apology from Beijing. The Chinese post had occurred against the backdrop of the Brereton Report and recent tensions in Australia–China relations. In response, Chinese Foreign Ministry spokesperson Hua Chunying expressed surprise at New Zealand's concern and defended the accuracy of the picture and posts.

=== Disagreements with Five Eyes partners ===
In mid-April 2021, Foreign Minister Nanaia Mahuta stated that New Zealand would not let the United States–led Five Eyes alliance dictate its bilateral relationship with China and that New Zealand was uncomfortable with expanding the remit of the intelligence grouping. In that statement Mahuta also described the relationship between New Zealand and China as the relationship between a taniwha and a dragon. Mahuta's statements came amidst rising disagreements between Wellington and Canberra on how to manage relations with Beijing. The Australian Government has expressed concern about the New Zealand Government's perceived efforts to undermine collective attempts to push back against what it regards as "increasingly aggressive behaviour from Beijing."

In response to Mahuta's remarks, Prime Minister Ardern claimed that New Zealand was still committed to the Five Eyes alliance but would not use the group as its first point for messaging on non-security matters. While The Telegraph's defence editor Con Coughlin criticised New Zealand for undermining the Five Eyes' efforts to put a united front against Beijing, the Global Times praised New Zealand for putting its own national interests over the Five Eyes.

=== Chinese cyber attacks ===
On 20 July 2021, the Minister in charge of the Government Communications Security Bureau (GCSB) Andrew Little confirmed that the spy agency had established links between Chinese state-sponsored actors known as "Advanced Persistent Threat 40" (APT40) and malicious cyber activity in New Zealand. In addition, Little confirmed that New Zealand was joining other Western governments including the United States, United Kingdom, Australia and the European Union in condemning the Chinese Ministry of State Security and other Chinese state-sponsored actors for their involvement in the 2021 Microsoft Exchange Server data breach. In response, the Chinese Embassy in New Zealand rejected these allegations and lodged a "solemn representation" with the New Zealand Government.

On 21 July, Foreign Minister Nanaia Mahuta confirmed that New Zealand Foreign Ministry officials had met with Chinese Embassy officials at the request of the Chinese Embassy in response to the cyber attack allegations. The Embassy urged the New Zealand Government to abandon its so-called "Cold War mentality." New Zealand exporters have expressed concerns that an escalation of diplomatic tensions could have serious implications for China-New Zealand trade.

In March 2024 the GCSB's Director-General Andrew Clark, GCSB Minister Judith Collins, Prime Minister Christopher Luxon and Foreign Minister Winston Peters accused the Chinese government of using hacker group APT40 to breach the New Zealand Parliamentary Service and the Parliamentary Council Office's computer systems in 2021. In response, a Chinese Embassy spokesperson dismissed the complaint as "groundless and irresponsible accusations" and confirmed it would lodge a complaint with New Zealand officials. Reports of the data hack accompanied reports that the United States, British and Australian governments had sanctioned APT40 for similar activities in their countries. Former Prime Minister and Labour leader Chris Hipkins confirmed he had also been briefed about the attempted cyber attacks back in 2021 but had not publicly disclosed the attack due to procedures around protecting sources, navigating loopholes and managing diplomatic relations with China.

=== 2021 Hong Kong legislative election ===
Following the 2021 Hong Kong legislative election held in December 2021, Foreign Minister Mahuta joined New Zealand's Five Eyes partners in issuing a joint statement criticising the exclusion of opposition candidates and urging China to respect human rights and freedoms in Hong Kong in accordance with the Sino-British Joint Declaration. In response, the Chinese Embassy in Wellington issued a statement claiming the elections were "politically inclusive and fair" and urging the Five Eyes alliance to respect Chinese sovereignty over Hong Kong.

=== 2022 Sino-Solomon Islands defence pact ===
In late March 2022, Prime Minister Ardern and Foreign Minister Mahuta joined the Australian Government in voicing concerns about a proposed Solomon Islands security agreement with China. This agreement would allow China to deploy military and security forces in the Solomon Islands and to establish a military base.

=== AUKUS Pillar 2 ===
On 1 February 2024, Australia agreed to brief New Zealand on AUKUS Pillar 2 developments following a joint bilateral meeting between Australian and New Zealand foreign and defence ministers Penny Wong, Winston Peters, Richard Marles and Judith Collins in Melbourne. Australian Defence Minister Marles confirmed that Australia would send officials to brief their New Zealand counterparts on Pillar 2, which would focus on the exchange of non-nuclear military technology. The four ministers also issued a joint statement expressing concerns about human rights violations in Xinjiang, Tibet and Hong Kong. In response to the joint Australian-NZ meeting, the Chinese Embassy in Wellington issued a statement condemning alleged interference in China's domestic affairs and describing AUKUS as inimical to international nuclear non-proliferation efforts. On 12 February, the New Zealand Labour Party also abandoned its previous support for the Pillar Two component of AUKUS, with associate foreign spokesperson Phil Twyford describing AUKUS as an "offensive warfighting alliance against China."

=== 2025 China-Cook Islands partnership agreement ===
In early February 2025, New Zealand Foreign Minister Winston Peters criticised the Cook Islands Prime Minister Mark Brown for not consulting New Zealand about plans to sign a strategic partnership agreement with China in mid-February 2025. As an associated state in a free association relationship with New Zealand, the Cook Islands and New Zealand are obliged to consult each other on foreign policy and security issues. Brown has rejected New Zealand's position on the grounds that the partnership agreement did not involve foreign affairs and defence. Brown's relations with New Zealand had also been strained after Peters blocked his plans to introduce a separate Cook Islands passport while retaining New Zealand citizenship.

On 7 February 2025, the Chinese Embassy in New Zealand issued a statement that China and the Cook Islands "have treated each other as equals and pursued mutually beneficial relations since the establishment of diplomatic relations in 1997." On 10 February, Chinese Foreign Ministry spokesperson Guo Jiakun stated that "the relationship between China and the Cook Islands does not target any third party, and should not be disrupted or restrained by any third party." The Cook Islands and Chinese governments signed the partnership agreement on 14 February. In response, a spokesperson for Peters said that New Zealand would review the agreement in accordance to its national interests and constitutional relationship with the Cook Islands.

=== 2025 Chinese naval exercises ===
On 20 February 2025, New Zealand Defence Minister Judith Collins and Australian Defence Minister Richard Marles confirmed that the Australian and New Zealand Defence Forces were monitoring three Chinese naval warships that were sailing through international waters near Sydney. The Chinese warships carried out three live-fire exercises, disrupting several flights across the Tasman Sea. On 26 February, Foreign Minister Peters met with Chinese Foreign Minister Wang Yi to raise New Zealand's concerns about ongoing Chinese naval exercises in the Tasman Sea and China's recent partnership agreement with the Cook Islands. Wang agreed to consider New Zealand and Australian concerns that its military did not give enough notice before staging live-fire exercises in the Tasman Sea.

=== Censorship by China ===
In July 2025, a diplomatic incident emerged between China and New Zealand after the Chinese Embassy attempted to pressure the DocEdge Festival in Auckland to cancel the screening of a documentary critical of China's activities in the South China Sea. The festival organisers received a formal letter from the embassy objecting to the film's portrayal of maritime disputes and reiterating China's historical claims in the region. In response, DocEdge publicly defended its programming choices, affirmed its commitment to curatorial independence and free expression, and published the embassy's letter in full. The festival encouraged viewers to watch the film and draw their own conclusions. The incident highlighted growing concerns over foreign diplomatic efforts to influence cultural and media events in New Zealand. The Chinese Consulate General in Auckland had requested cancellation of further screenings of the documentary which had already premiered on 30 June. DocEdge published the consulate's statement on its website, citing a "commitment to transparency and fairness". The documentary in question was Food Delivery: Fresh From the West Philippine Seas.

=== Air and maritime operations ===
On 18 April 2026, representatives from the Chinese Ministry of National Defense and Chinese Foreign Ministry lodged a diplomatic complaint with the New Zealand Government. They alleged that an RNZAF Boeing P-8 Poseidon had violated Chinese airspace over the Yellow Sea and East China Sea. The New Zealand Defence Force has denied breaching Chinese airspace, stating that it was monitoring shipping near North Korea for violations of United Nations sanctions as part of the multinational Pacific Security Maritime Exchange. Massey University senior defence and security studies fellow John Battersby attributed the stern Chinese response to tensions in the Pacific over aid, policing agreements and the Chinese-Cook Islands partnership.

== See also ==
- Sino-Pacific relations
- Foreign relations of China
- Foreign relations of New Zealand
