= China Film =

China Film may refer to:

- China Film Group Corporation, founded in 1999.
- China Film Group Co., Ltd., founded in 2010.
