= Alain Mayrand =

Canadian composer

Alain Mayrand is a Canadian composer, orchestrator, and conductor known for his contributions to film music. He served as the lead composer for the animated feature film Mosley and has contributed to the scores of major motion pictures such as Ender's Game and Elysium, among others.

== Career ==
Mayrand holds a bachelor's degree in piano performance and guitar from Bishop's University, as well as a master's degree in composition from The University of British Columbia. In addition to his formal studies, he trained in cello and flute to enhance his compositional skills, with the cello remaining his favorite instrument. Mayrand served as Composer-in-Residence with the Vancouver Metropolitan Orchestra for four years.

Mayrand's concert music has been commissioned, performed, and recorded by ensembles worldwide. Among the orchestras that have performed his music are the Vancouver Metropolitan Orchestra, the Russian Film Music Symphony Orchestra, the Evergreen Symphony Orchestra of Taipei, the Ramat-Gan Orchestra in Israel, and the Troy University Concert Band in Alabama.

Mayrand was twice commissioned by the Dallas Chamber Symphony to compose original scores for their silent film series. In 2013, he wrote an original score for Ask Father, directed by Hal Roach starring Harold Lloyd. The score premiered during a concert screening on November 19, 2013. In 2019, he wrote an original score for The Wind, directed by Victor Sjöström and starring Lilian Gish, which premiered November 23, 2019. Both premieres were held at Moody Performance Hall and conducted by Richard McKay.

== Filmography ==
| Year | Title | Credit(s) | Director(s) |
|---|---|---|---|
| 2023 | The Performance | Composer | Shira Piven |
| 2023 | The Martini Shot | Composer | Stephen Wallis |
| 2021 | Defining Moments | Composer | Stephen Wallis |
| 2020 | The Elephant in the Room | Composer | Jonathan D. Bucari |
| 2018 | Dear Brian | Composer | Tyler Wallach |
| 2017 | Rue: The Short Film | Composer | Derek Franson |
| 2015 | Frog | Composer | Tyler Wallach |
| 2015 | Numb | Composer | Jason R. Goode |
| 2015 | No Letting Go | Composer Orchestrator | Jonathan D. Bucari |
| 2014 | Primary | Composer Conductor Music Preparation | Ross Ferguson |
| 2013 | Denial | Composer | James Sharpe |
| 2011 | Comforting Skin | Composer | Derek Franson |
| 2010 | The Legend of Silk Boy | Composer Conductor Music Editor Music Producer | David Liu |
| 2009 | Lazy Susan | Composer | Nick Peet |
| 2008 | From the Sky | Composer | Ian Ebright |
| 2006 | Echoes of an Epic | Composer | Jeff Richards |
| 2005 | Say Yes | Composer | Stewart Wade |
| 2004 | My Father's an Actor | Composer | Sara McIntyre |
| 2003 | Alexis | Composer | Michael A. Migliore |
| 2003 | Art History | Composer | Nick Bicanic |
| 2019 | Mosley | Music Preparation Conductor Music Supervisor | Kirby Atkins Jun Huang |
| 2017 | What Happened to Monday | Conductor Music Preparation Orchestrator | Tommy Wirkola |
| 2015 | Olympus | Conductor Orchestrator | Nick Willing (creator) |
| 2014 | Dead Snow 2: Red vs. Dead | Conductor Orchestrator | Tommy Wirkola |
| 2013 | Elysium | Conductor Orchestrator | Niel Blomkamp |
| 2006 | The Gutter Diaries | Composer (additional music) | Josh Whittall |
| 2004 | The Man Who Never Had a Girlfriend | Music Recordist | Thomas Lundy |
