= Consulate-General of China, Auckland =

Consulate-General of China in Auckland, New Zealand

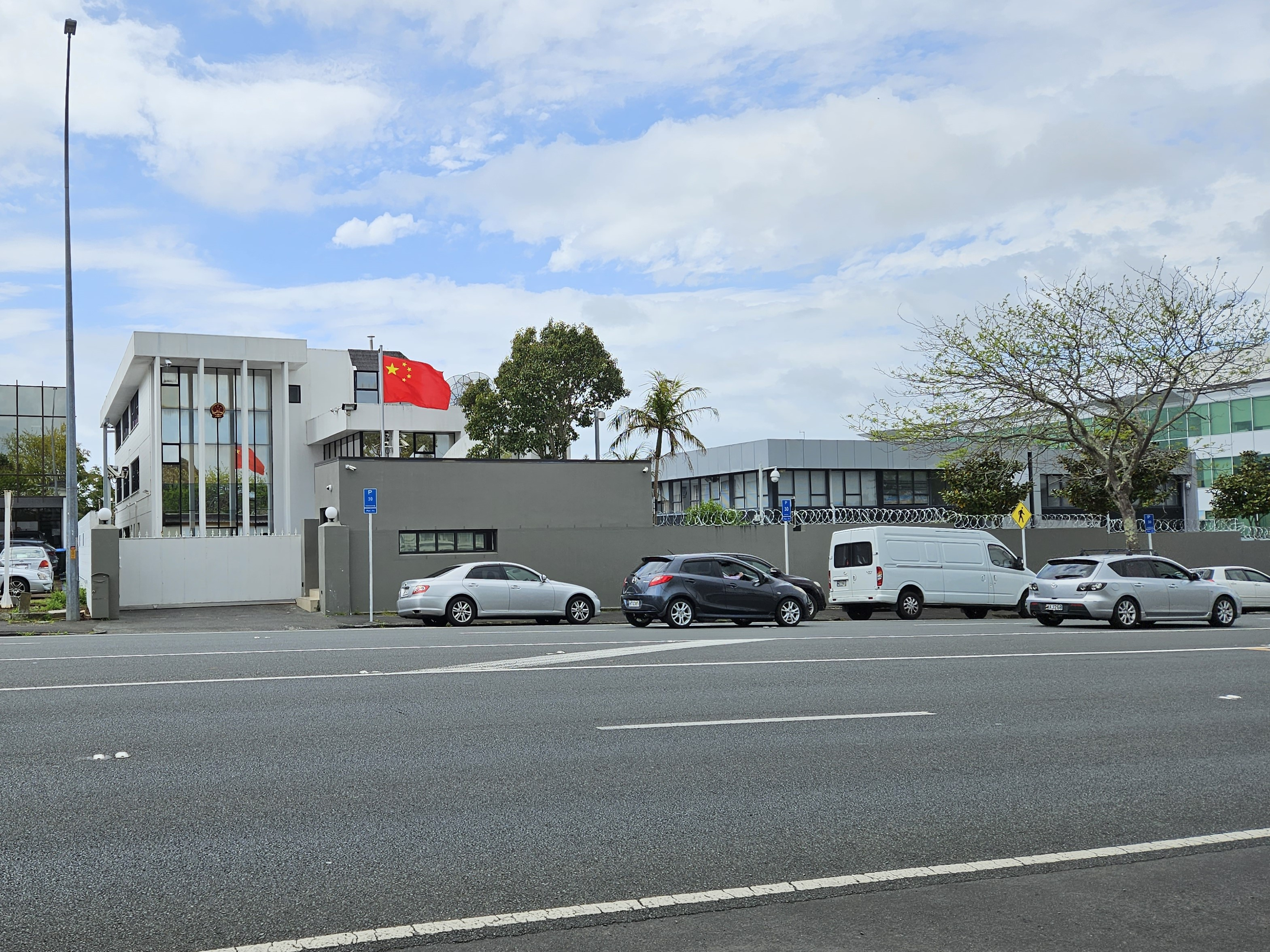
- Location: Ellerslie, Auckland
- Address: 588 Great South Road, Ellerslie, Auckland 1051, New Zealand
- Coordinates: 36.89627°S 174.80175°E
- Consul General: Chen Shijie
- Website: Official website

The Consulate-General of the People's Republic of China in Auckland (Chinese: 中华人民共和国驻奥克兰总领事馆; pinyin: Zhōnghuá Rénmín Gònghéguó Zhù Àokèlán Zǒnglǐngshìguǎn) is a diplomatic mission of the People's Republic of China (PRC) at 588 Great South Road in the suburb of Ellerslie in Auckland, New Zealand. The consulate serves cities in the Auckland Region, Waikato region, and the Northland Region.

== History ==
On 9 May 1991, the People's Republic of China signed the "Agreement on the Establishment of Consulate Generals and the Memorandum on the Consulate Districts of the Consulate General of the People's Republic of China in Auckland and that of New Zealand in Shanghai," which allowed for the establishment of the Consulate-General of the People's Republic of China in Auckland and the Consulate-General of New Zealand in Shanghai and their respective consular districts. New Zealand signed the agreement on 8 June 1992. The Auckland PRC consulate opened in June 1992.

In February 2021, the consulate was affected by a phony bomb threat made by individuals including those with the names of "张卫能 utoyo" and that of “full_discl0sure”, on an Auckland area events website Aucklife that they had taken over via hacking. Their motive was reportedly a punitive response against China due to COVID-19.

== Controversies ==
=== 30th anniversary of the Tiananmen Square protests ===
In late July 2019, the media organisation Newsroom reported that the Vice Consul General Xiao Yewen had lobbied Auckland University of Technology (AUT) into cancelling an event commemorating the 30th anniversary of the Tiananmen Square massacre. Newsroom also reported that the Consulate-General had lobbied AUT and the University of Auckland into dropping the screening of a documentary criticising the Confucius Institutes in 2018. While AUT went ahead with the screening, the University of Auckland cancelled their screening.

=== 2019–20 Hong Kong protests ===
In early August 2019, the Chinese-Consulate General praised what it deemed the "patriotic actions" of Chinese students who confronted a group of pro-Hong Kong democracy student activists at the University of Auckland, who had set up a Lennon Wall commemorating the 2019–2020 Hong Kong protests. One of the Chinese students had struck a Hong Kong student during an altercation at the university in late July 2019. The Consulate-General also condemned pro-Hong Kong activists as separatists. In response, ACT Party leader David Seymour sent a letter to the Consulate-General criticising it for interfering in New Zealand internal affairs. On 7 August 2019, it was reported that New Zealand Ministry of Foreign Affairs and Trade officials had cautioned Chinese officials about their interference in New Zealand affairs. Prime Minister Jacinda Ardern also defended New Zealand's commitment to free speech on university campuses.

In response, the Chinese Foreign Ministry spokesperson Hua Chunying defended the Consulate-General's actions as "fulfilling its duty" and being "beyond reproach." Hua also criticised local "Hong Kong independence" activists for stirring up anti-China sentiment and called on certain New Zealanders to stop condoning "anti-China separatism" under the guise of free speech.

== See also ==
- China-New Zealand relations
- Diplomatic missions of the People's Republic of China
