= The Lost 15 Boys: The Big Adventure on Pirates' Island =

- Directed by: Xiaohan; Mao Qichao; Ba Yunfeng; Zhang Bing; Ryūtarō Nakamura
- Based on: Two Years' Vacation by Jules Verne
- Production companies: China Film Group Corporation; Sichuan Institute Of Media; Zhigengniao Computer Art Co., Ltd; Shanweiduo Media Co., Ltd
- Release dates: November 16, 2013 (Japan); October 1, 2014 (China)
- Running time: 82 minutes
- Countries: China; Japan
- Box office: ¥1.45 million (China)

The Lost 15 Boys: The Big Adventure on Pirates' Island (Chinese: 喵星少年漂流记) is a 2013 Chinese-Japanese animated adventure film directed by Xiaohan, Mao Qichao, Ba Yunfeng, Zhang Bing and Ryūtarō Nakamura. It is based on the novel Two Years' Vacation by Jules Verne. The film was released on November 16, 2013, in Japan and on October 1, 2014, in China.

== Voice cast ==
- Li Miao
- Yu Peixuan
- Zhou Yongxi
- Xiao Kaifei
- Zhang Mingxue

== Reception ==
By October 7, the film had earned ¥1.45 million at the Chinese box office.
