= Mosley (film) =

- Theatrical release poster
- Directed by: Kirby Atkins
- Written by: Kirby Atkins
- Produced by: Bill Boyce; Daniel Story; David Townsend; Yang Uhe; Chen Yengyu
- Starring: Kirby Atkins; Rhys Darby; Lucy Lawless; Temuera Morrison; Leah Atkins; John Rhys-Davies
- Cinematography: Markus Kristensen
- Edited by: Kathy Toon
- Music by: Harry Hansen
- Production companies: Saban Films; Lotus Entertainment; China Film Co., Ltd.; Huhu Studios; China Film Animation
- Distributed by: Rialto Distribution
- Release date: 10 October 2019
- Running time: 97 minutes
- Countries: New Zealand; China
- Language: English
- Budget: US$20 million

Mosley is a 2019 animated fantasy adventure drama film produced by Huhu Studios. It was written and directed by Kirby Atkins, co-directed by Jun Huang, and co-written by Ge Jing. The film stars Atkins and his daughter Leah as Mosley and Rue respectively, with Rhys Darby, Lucy Lawless, Temuera Morrison, and John Rhys-Davies in supporting roles. The film was released in New Zealand on 10 October 2019 by Rialto Distribution. It is the first New Zealand–Chinese co-production.

== Plot summary ==
In ancient times, the thoriphants were creatures that migrated north in response to human encroachment. Those that stayed behind were enslaved by humanity, who used them as beasts of burden. Gradually, their backs became bent and they lost the use of their hands. Some thoriphants believe that their cousins known as the Uprights will return to free them one day.

A young thoriphant named Mosley is auctioned off and sold to a farmer named Simon, who uses him to plough his fields. Twenty five years later, Mosley and his mate Bera have produced a son named Rue. Mosley and his family are also acquainted with Turpin, who serves as a beast of burden to traveling salesman Bemus and his associates Shank and Ollie. Later, Bemus tries to swindle Simon into purchasing a nearby rocky field. Simon agrees to sell Rue after Bera has given birth to her child, much to the dismay of Mosley and Bera.

Later that night Rue, guided by several fireflies, leads Mosley to a cave lined with drawings showing Upright Thoriphants. A dispirited Mosley dismisses them as fairy tales. Mosley and Bera later overhear Simon agreeing to sell Rue to Bemus following the birth of her second child. To save their son, Bera convinces Mosley to escape the following day and return to the caves in order to seek clues on how to find the "Uprights."

Despite being pursued by Simon, Bemus, Shank and Ollie, Mosley manages to escape into the forest. In response, Bemus convinces Simon to hire the services of the ruthless, tattooed bounty hunter Warfield to bring back Mosley alive. Inside the cave, Mosley stumbles into a sinkhole trap planted by Warfield. However, he manages to escape when Shank and Ollie interfere. Following a pursuit, Mosley manages to hide behind a waterfall with the help of several fireflies.

Behind the waterfall, Mosley encounters three "Upright" travelers named Warnie, Deaver, and the elderly Gailin and realizes that the legends of the Uprights were real. Warnie and his companions agree to bring Mosley back to their city Kineserath, under the pretense that the Uprights are a species of great warriors. During their travels, Mosley and the Uprights learns more about his people's history. They also have several adventures including avoiding death at the cursed "Great Orchard" and escaping Warfield with the help of the fireflies, who can communicate with Mosley and Gailin. Warnie realizes that the fireflies are not ordinary creatures but something mystical.

Back at Simon's farm, Rue tries to fill his father's shoes by looking after his heavily pregnant mother. Turpin encourages Rue with stories about the Upright and also teaches him to fetch a bucket. However, Semus sells Turpin, devastating Rue. When Bera enters into labour, she convinces Rue to seek Simon's help. Simon helps Bera to deliver her daughter Rosie.

Meanwhile, Mosley and the Upright reach Kineserath only to discover that the Upright are a dying species, who have not produced any children for a hundred years. Warnie reveals that the Upright are affected by the curse of the devolution, which he fears will cause them to regress into a non-sentient state. Warfield catches up with them, laying siege to Kineserath and killing Gailin with an arrow. To save their people, Queen Agaba convinces Mosley to venture into the cursed Orchard in order to find the Living Tree and eat of its fruit in order to reverse the curse.

With help of the thoriphants, Mosley lures Warfield into the Orchard. He attempts to reach the Living Tree but is mortally wounded by Warfield's arrows. Before Warfield can kill him, the mystical fireflies form a mystical bright being known as the Guardian, who drives Warfield away and heals Mosley. Mosley returns to the Upright with several of the Living Tree's fruits, which he eats and becomes an Upright.

The Upright Mosley returns to Simon's farm where he stops Simon from selling Rue to Bemus. Following a confrontation, he frees his family from servitude. Mosley also gives Bera, Rue, and Rosie fruits from the Living Tree, causing them to become Upright. Together, the family leave Simon's farm to start a new life in Kineserath.

== Cast ==
- Kirby Atkins as Mosley, a thoriphant who was separated from his mother in childhood and resigns himself to a life of servitude. After he and his son Rue discover the Upright cave, he embarks on a quest to find the fabled City of the Uprights.
  - Levi Guyan as a young Mosley
- Rhys Darby as Deaver, Warnie's 104 year old younger brother.
- Lucy Lawless as Bera, Mosley's partner and Rue's protective mother.
- Temuera Morrison as Warfield, a ruthless bounty hunter who specialises in hunting thoriphants.
- Leah Atkins as Rue, Mosley's curious and bubbling five-year old son.
- John Rhys-Davies as Warnie, an Upright and Deaver's older brother. Kindly and stern, he is hesitant to reveal the secret of the Uprights to Mosley.
- John Phillips as Bemus, an unscrupulous salesman who runs "Bemus' Traveling Medicine Show" with his hapless cohorts, Shank and Ollie.
- Curt Cloninger as Simon, a bachelor farmer with an ill temper and the owner of Mosley, Bera, and Rue. He has a tragic past.
- Kendall Hewitt as Shank, one of Bemus' associates
- Ryan Roebuck as Ollie, one of Bemus' associates
- Stephen Gledhill as Gailin, an elderly friend of Warnie and Deaver.
- Irene Wood as Queen Agaba, ruler of the Kineserath.
- Timothy Raby as Turpin, a wise old thoriphant who has spent much of his life in servitude. He is one of the few thoriphants left who believe in legends of the Upright. Raby also voices Rubric and a bouncer.
- Lara Macgregor as Pika.
- Markus Kristensen voices a thoriphant bounty and a postman.
- Caleb Atkins as Enoch Man
- Teuila Blakely as Customer 1
- Adrian Smith as Customer 2
- Daryl Habraken as the Guardian
- Kalo Toon as Rosie
  - Scarlett Sills as additional Rue dialogue

== Production ==
Mosley had been in development by Kirby Atkins since 1997 under the name Beast of Burden. John A. Davis and Keith Alcorn of DNA Productions were initially designated as the film's co-producers. Atkins dedicated the film to his mentor Hollywood animator Pres Romanillos. The two had met while working on the 2006 Warner Bros. animated film The Ant Bully. Atkins and Romanillos traveled to Spain to begin development on "Beast of Burden" but unfortunately, while in Salamanca, Pres was diagnosed with Leukemia, leading to a long battle with the disease. He eventually died after several bone marrow transplants on July 17, 2010. Devastated, Atkins continued privately on his story while working as a screenwriter in a small Tennessee town with his wife, Priscilla, and two young children.

During an interview with the New Zealand Herald's senior entertainment writer Karl Puschmann, Atkins said that he would spend any spare moment working on the film, adding that "I loved the world and the characters and the idea of it so much I couldn't quit playing with it." By the time Atkins' daughter Leah had turned seven years old, he was ready to begin pre-production, having completed a full storyboard treatment of his script and the dialogue. Reflecting on Leah's involvement in the story development, Atkins said

"Leah had seen me writing and drawing these characters and been playing the story out on the floor for years. I recorded [us] playing and you actually hear that performance in the movie. Child actors tend to overdo it, you can tell they're acting, but Leah was just playing. It was a beautiful, unhindered performance...

In October 2014, Huhu Studios sought help from the New Zealand Film Commission in finding co-production and distribution partners for Beasts of Burden. In May 2015, The Hollywood Reporter reported that China Film Animation, the animation division of the China Film Group had entered into a co-production agreement with Huhu Studios to produce Beasts of Burden, which was allocated a budget of US$20 million. The film was initially set for a 2017 release. Huhu Studios CEO Trevor Yaxley and China Film Animation's Jun Huang were designated as producers while Michael Cerenzie of the Toronto–based Strategem Entertainment and Kevin Spivak of SMI Entertainment were also designated as executive producers.

The film was subsequently renamed Mosley, with several New Zealand media describing it as the first official New Zealand–Chinese co-production. In July 2019, Rhys Darby, Lucy Lawless, and Temuera Morrison were identified as cast members. Manuel Aparicio served as animation director, Randy Hayes as lead animator, Markus Kristensen as cinematographer and production designer, Alain Mayrand as music director, Bill Boyce, Daniel Story, David Townsend, and Yang Uhe, and Chen Zhenyu served as producers while Pixar veteran Kathy Toon served as editor.

Chris Omundsen served as the movie's special effects lead while Grant Watkins served as first assistant editor. The film's executive producers have included Tony Bancroft, Ye Changchun, John Dunn, Jeremie Guiraud, Wu Hongling, Deng Jianxin, Wang Jinle, La Peikang, Jack Sheehan, Zhao Yan, Nathan Yang, and Trevoy Yaxley.

== Promotion and release ==
Mosley was theatrically released in New Zealand by Rialto Distributors on 10 October 2019. Cast member Rhys Darby promoted the film during an interview with New Zealand Herald journalist Karl Puschmann in early October 2019. The film is also available on the iTunes Store in Australia.

== Reception ==
Liam Maguren of the New Zealand film and cinema website "Flicks.co.nz" described Mosley as "a worthy all-ages adventure" while warning about a heartbreaking moment in the opening act. While describing the film's visuals as a "mixed bag", Maguren praised story writer and director Kirby Atkins for a compelling story and impressive animation, opining that the Thoriphants' character expressions matched the quality of Pixar's animation. Maguren also praised Mosley for standing out in a children's cinema "clogged up with merchandise tie-ins."

Steve Kopian at unseenfilms.net declared, “Kirby Atkins' two decade labor of love is amazing. A kick-ass film, it will move you to tears. This is not a by the numbers tale by any stretch of the imagination, with the result that we are moved much more deeply than most recent Disney or Pixar films. Told with beautiful images, perfect voices and a magnificent sense of daring do, MOSLEY is the kind of film they don't make anymore, a myth made modern, perfectly modulated to delight, move and inspire its audience. This is a story of growth and hope and exactly the sort of film we need right now.”

James Croot of the news website Stuff gave the film a mixed review, awarding it three stars. While describing Mosley as "slickly animated and impressively rendered," he opined that the film "lacked the narrative sparkle and sheen of a Pixar or Dreamworks feature." Despite its "uneven tone," Croot praised the film for what he regarded as a "decent amount of action", its familiar voices, and a "couple of clever twists and turns."

Francesca Rudkin of the New Zealand Herald gave the film four stars and praised Atkins for presenting Mosley's "hefty themes in a way that people of all ages could relate to." She described the film as a "family affair", praising Atkins and his daughter Leah for their voice work as Mosley and Rue. Rudkin wrote that

Mosley is a family affair, with Atkins voicing Mosley and daughter Leah voicing Rue. It's clear they've lived these characters a long time and they're joined by a cast who take great care as they bring their well-formed characters to life. Charming and heartfelt, hopefully this won't be the last we see of Mosley.

Chris Robinson of Cartoon Brew described the film as a "quiet, poignant and dramatic film (with comic moments) that addresses timeless themes of tolerance, family, and the importance of finding your true self."

On the review aggregator website Rotten Tomatoes, 60% of 5 critics' reviews are positive, with an average rating of 5.3/10.

=== Accolades ===
On 16 October 2019, Mosley was nominated for "Best Animated Feature" at the Twelfth Asia Pacific Screen Awards held in Brisbane, Australia and listed as a "special screening event" at the Annecy Film Festival. In 2020 the film was nominated for "Best Animated Feature" at the Ottawa International Animation Festival, the Burbank International Film Festival, and the Festival of Cinema New York City. The film also won the Golden Dolphin Award for Best Animated Feature Film at China's 13th Xiamen International Animation Festival.
