= Chinese Herald =

New Zealand Chinese-language newspaper

- Owner: Lili Wang
- Founded: 1994; 32 years ago
- Language: Simplified Chinese
- Headquarters: Auckland
- Country: New Zealand
- Website: www.chineseherald.co.nz

The Chinese Herald (Chinese: 新西兰中文先驱网) is a Chinese-language newspaper published in New Zealand. Between 2016 and 2019, it operated the Chinese New Zealand Herald website in a joint venture with New Zealand Media and Entertainment.

== History and management ==
The Chinese Herald was founded in 1994 by Wilson & Horton as the New Zealand Chinese Herald Weekly (Chinese: 新西兰先驱报中文周刊) before changing its name in 1997. It is currently owned by businesswoman Lili Wang, who acquired the newspaper in 2015.

In 2017, academic Anne-Marie Brady wrote that the newspaper "has close personnel links to the [Chinese] consulate and works with the All-China Federation of Overseas Chinese". Personnel from the Chinese Herald have attended media forums in China on multiple occasions; including regular appearances at the state-linked Global Chinese-Language Media Forum. Wang attended the 2018 Media Cooperation Forum in Hainan hosted by its provincial government and the state-run People's Daily.

=== Chinese New Zealand Herald ===
In October 2016, the Chinese Herald and New Zealand Media and Entertainment (NZME, publisher of The New Zealand Herald) launched a joint venture website called the Chinese New Zealand Herald, which was owned equally between the two.

In September 2019, Newsroom reported that the Chinese New Zealand Herald's organizational structure and state permits amounted to supervision and control by Chinese Communist Party (CCP) authorities; for example, the website was operated by a fully owned subsidiary of the state news agency China News Service. Newsroom also cited experts who identified the content as Chinese government propaganda. NZME denied that the website's content was dependent on Chinese government approval. The Chinese New Zealand Herald had earlier that year been the subject of controversy for editing translated New Zealand Herald stories to place the Chinese government in a positive light while omitting stories discussing it negatively, and for retracting a misleading article about the 2019 Hong Kong protests. In December 2019, the joint venture ended after NZME sold its stake to the Chinese Herald.

== Content ==
As of 2019, the newspaper published three times a week on Tuesdays, Thursdays, and Saturdays. In 2022, the outlet stated the newspaper had a readership of over 90,000, and that the website received 200,000 unique visitors per week, 70% of whom from New Zealand and 25% from China. Wang has stated that the main target audience is "people living in New Zealand who speak Mandarin".

The Chinese Herald publishes both original content and content reproduced from other sources, with international stories often sourced from Chinese state media and domestic stories from English-language New Zealand media. Local experts interviewed by State Media Monitor in 2024 and 2025 reportedly assessed the outlet as "functioning as a propaganda tool for the Chinese government".

According to Radio Free Asia, the Chinese Herald won a lengthy defamation lawsuit against another Chinese-language newspaper, New Times Weekly. Chinese Herald sued New Times Weekly for claiming the Chinese Herald had yielded to CCP control after it published articles in 2001 praising the 1989 Tiananmen Square massacre. New Times Weekly closed down in 2011 after paying compensation.

== See also ==
- China–New Zealand relations
