= Vancouver Metropolitan Orchestra =

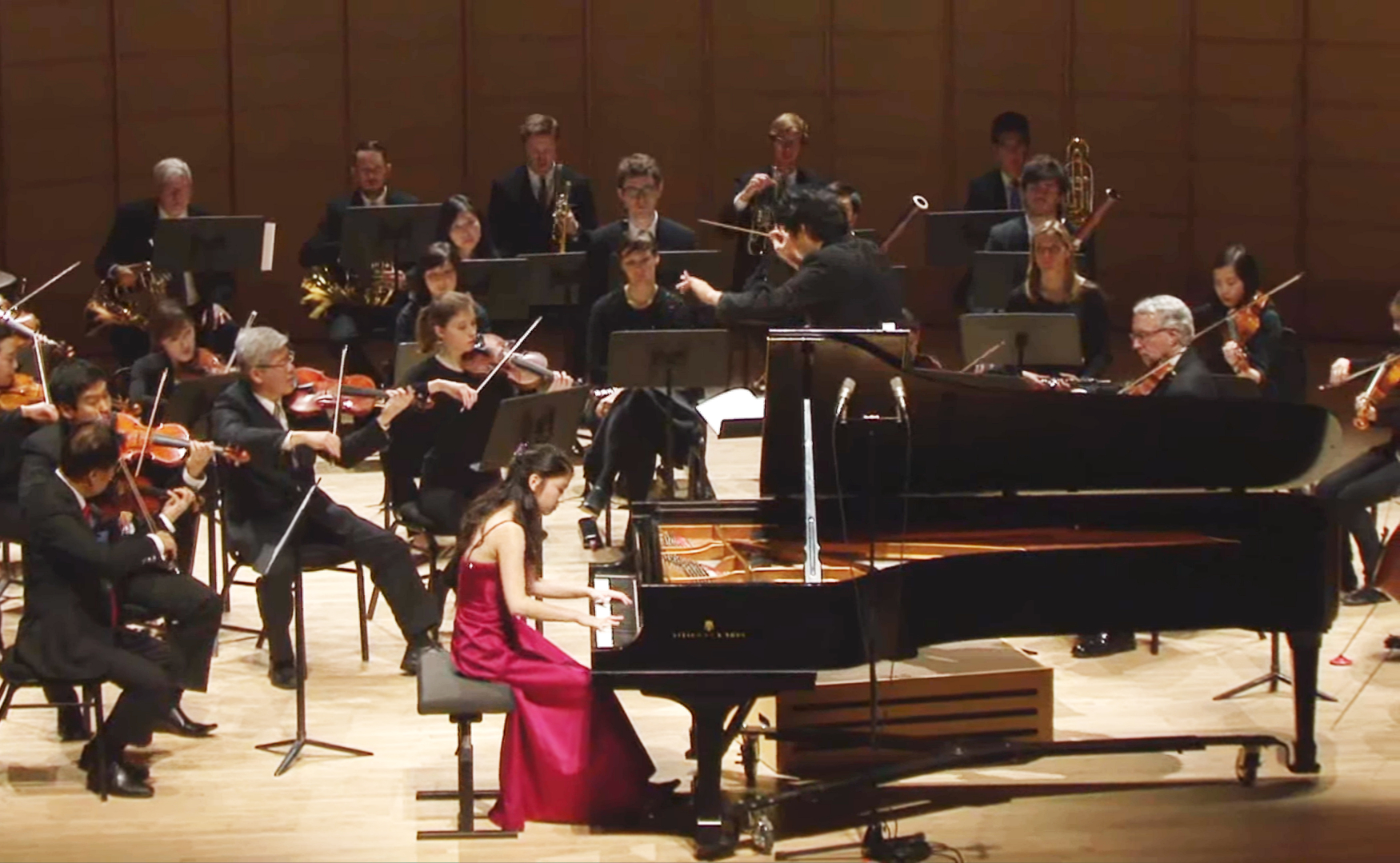
16-year-old Claire An-Ching Lee performs as a soloist with the Vancouver Metropolitan Orchestra at the Chan Centre for the Performing Arts in April 2014.

The Vancouver Metropolitan Orchestra (VMO) is an orchestra based in the Lower Mainland area of Vancouver, British Columbia, Canada. The VMO is a registered not-for-profit charitable organization, and was founded in 2003.

In the decade, the VMO has continually provided job opportunities to the alumni of the Music School of the University of British Columbia, which includes the players, administration staffs and the board of directors.

VMO performs music from the Baroque, Classical, and Romantic periods. Contemporary and popular music is also performed, in concerts with opera companies, choirs, and traditional folk music groups.

Kenneth Hsieh has been the music director since the orchestra's founding, and is the principal conductor.
