= China Film Animation =

Animation studio owned by China Film Group

- Industry: Animation
- Headquarters: China
- Key people: Jun Huang (President, CEO)
- Products: Animated films
- Owner: China Film Group

China Film Animation is the animation division of China Film Group.

== History ==
In 2015, it was part of a deal to produce several feature films, together with Qi Tai Culture Development Group and Huhu Studios, contributing around 55% of the budget.

In October 2019, it was reported that China Film Animation and Huhu Studios had jointly produced the animated New Zealand film Mosley, making the film the first official New Zealand–China co-production.

== Filmography ==
- SXD: Middle Kingdom (2018)
- Mosley (2019)
