= China Film Group (2010) =

Chinese state-owned film corporation owner by China Film Group Corporation

China Film Group Co., Ltd.
- Native name: 中国电影产业集团股份有限公司
- Formerly: China Film Co., Ltd. (2010–2025)
- Type: Public State-owned
- Traded as: SSE: 600977
- ISIN: CNE100002GX0
- Industry: Motion picture
- Founded: December 2010; 15 years ago
- Headquarters: Beijing, China
- Key people: Li Xianzeng (chairman)
- Services: Film production; Film distribution; Television production
- Owner: China Film Group Corporation (67.36%)

Chinese name
- Simplified Chinese: 中国电影产业集团股份有限公司
Transcriptions
Standard Mandarin
- Hanyu Pinyin: Zhōngguó diànyǐng Chǎnyè jítuán Gǔfèn Yǒuxiàn Gōngsī

former Chinese name
- Simplified Chinese: 中国电影股份有限公司
Transcriptions
Standard Mandarin
- Hanyu Pinyin: Zhōngguó diànyǐng Gǔfèn Yǒuxiàn Gōngsī
- Website: zgdygf.com

China Film Group Co., Ltd. (Chinese: 中国电影产业集团股份有限公司), Formerly known as China Film Co., Ltd. (Chinese: 中国电影股份有限公司), is a Chinese state-owned film production and distribution corporation headquartered in Beijing, China. the company was founded in 2010 by China Film Group Corporation and seven strategic investment units.

China Film Group's main business encompasses six major sectors: creation, distribution, exhibition, technology, services, and innovation, covering film and television production; post-film product management; promotion and distribution of domestic and imported films, secondary market distribution; cinema investment and management, cinema chain operation; film technology research and development, film and television equipment production, sales and technical services; film production, ticketing platforms, and financial leasing services.

== History ==
In August 2016, China Film Co., Ltd. was listed on the main board of the Shanghai Stock Exchange, becoming the first state-owned film corporation to be listed on the A-share market.

In June 2025, China Film Co., Ltd. officially changed its name to China Film Group Co., Ltd., its stock abbreviation and stock code remain unchanged.

== Leadership ==
=== Chairman ===
- Han Sanping (2010–2014)
- La Peikang (2014–2019)
- Jiao Hongfen (2019–2022)
- Fu Ruoqing (2022–present)

== Films ==
=== Filmography ===
Release date	Title	Produced by	Distributed by
2013	Man of Tai Chi	China Film Co., Ltd, Wanda Media, Village Roadshow Pictures Asia, Universal Studios	RADiUS-TWC (US), Entertainment One (CA), Roadshow Entertainment (AU/NZ/Singapore), China Film Co., Ltd., Wanda Media (China), Universal Pictures (International)
2014	The Monkey King	Filmko Entertainment, Pegasus Motion Pictures, China Film Co., Ltd, Shenzhen Golden Shores Films, Zhejiang HG Entertainment, Dongguan Boning Entreprise and Investment, Beijing Wen Hua Dong Run Investment Co., Ltd., China Film Co-Production Corporation, Global Star Productions	Filmko Entertainment (Hong Kong; International), Newport Entertainment (Hong Kong), Beijing Anshi Naying Culture Co. (China), China Film Co., Ltd. (China), Wanda Media (China), Global Star Productions
2014	The Crossing	Beijing Gallop Horse Film, Le Vision Pictures, China Film Co., Ltd., Huayi Brothers, Yoozoo Entertainment, Beijing Cultural & Creative Industry Investment Fund Management, Dongyang Mighty Allies Movie & Culture, Huace Pictures, Beijing Phenom Films, China Movie Channel, Galloping Horse Culture & Media, Lion Rock Productions	N/A
2014	Black & White: The Dawn of Justice	Beijing Hualu Baina Entertainment Co., Ltd, Pulajia International Entertainment Co., Ltd, Yinli Entertainment Investment Co, Ltd, China Film Group Corporation, Beijing Yunqi Media Co., Ltd, Dongyang Hualu Baina Entertainment Co., Ltd	N/A
2014	The Deathday Party	Beijing Guanghui Liansheng Entertainment Co., Ltd, China Film Group Corporation, Golden Harvest Entertainment Co. Ltd, HG Entertainment, E Mei Film Group, Sichuan Eying Xinshengli Media Co., Ltd	N/A
2014	The Lost 15 Boys: The Big Adventure on Pirates' Island	China Film Group Corporation, Sichuan Institute of Media, Zhigengniao Computer Art Co., Ltd, Shanweiduo Media Co., Ltd	N/A
2014	One Step Away	Shanghai Film Group Co., Ltd, China Film Group Corporation	N/A
2015	Seventh Son	Legendary Pictures, Thunder Road Pictures, China Film Group Corporation	Universal Studios
2015	Furious 7	Original Film, One Race Films, Media Rights Capital, China Film Co., Ltd., Relativity Media	Universal Studios
2015	Wolf Totem	China Film Co., Ltd., China Movie Channel, Beijing Forbidden City Film Co., Reperage, Beijing Phoenix Entertainment Co., Chinavision Media Group, Mars Films, Wild Bunch Groupe Herodiade	China Film Group Corporation, Mars Distribution, Edko Films
2015	Pixels	Happy Madison Productions, 1492 Pictures, China Film Co., Ltd., Film Croppers Entertainment	Columbia Pictures
2015	Crouching Tiger, Hidden Dragon II: The Green Destiny	China Film Group Corporation, Pegasus Taihe Entertainment, The Weinstein Company, Yucaipa Films	Netflix, The Weinstein Company
2016	The Mermaid	China Film Group, Edko Films, The Star Overseas, Hehe Pictures Co., Ltd, Beijing Enlight Pictures, Shanghai New Culture Media Group Co., Ltd, Alibaba Pictures Group Limited, Shanghai Tianshi Media Co., Ltd, BinGo Group Co., Ltd	Beijing Enlight Pictures, China Film Group Corporation
2016	Air Strike	China Film Group Corporation	N/A
2016	Warcraft	Legendary Pictures, Blizzard Entertainment, Atlas Entertainment	Universal Studios
2016	The Great Wall	Legendary East, Le Vision Pictures, Atlas Entertainment, China Film Group Corporation	Universal Studios Le Vision Pictures
2016	Xuanzang	China Film Group Corporation, Eros International	China Film Group Corporation
2016	Tik Tok	China Film Group Corporation, Beijing Hairun Pictures	China Film Group Corporation
2016	My Best Friend's Wedding	China Film Group Corporation, Columbia Pictures	China Film Group Corporation
2017	The Fate of the Furious	Original Film, One Race Films, China Film Co., Ltd.	Universal Studios
2017	Wolf Warrior 2	Beijing Dengfeng International Media, China Film Group Corporation, Bona Films, Beijing Culture	
2019	The Wandering Earth	China Film Co., Ltd., Beijing Jingxi Culture, Beijing Dengfeng International Culture Communication Co., Ltd., GIFilm Beijing Studio Co., Ltd.	China Film Co., Ltd., Netflix
2019	The Mammals Kingdom	China Film Animation	Aparat Animation Films, Netflix
2019	Mosley	Huhu Studios, China Film Animation	Rialto Distribution
2021	Detective Chinatown 3	Wanda Pictures, Beijing Yitong Legend Films, China Film Co., Ltd.	
2021	Cliff Walkers	China Film Co., Ltd., Emperor Group, Shanghai Film Group, Huaxia Film Distribution	
2021	Chinese Doctors	Bona Film Group, Zhujiang Film Group, Hubei Yangtze River Film Group, China Film Co., Ltd., Huaxia Film Distribution, Alibaba Pictures	
2021	My Country, My Parents	China Film Co., Ltd.	
2021	The Battle at Lake Changjin	Beijing Bona Film Group Co., Ltd., August First Film Studio, Huaxia Film Distribution, China Film Co., Ltd., Shanghai Film Group, Alibaba Pictures, Beijing Dengfeng International Culture Communications Company	
2021	Embrace Again	China Film Co., Ltd.	
2022	The Battle at Lake Changjin II	Beijing Bona Film Group Co., Ltd., August First Film Studio, Huaxia Film Distribution, China Film Co., Ltd., Shanghai Film Group, Alibaba Pictures, Beijing Dengfeng International Culture Communications Company	
2022	Nice View	Dirty Monkeys (Shanghai) Culture Communication Ltd.	
2022	Only Fools Rush In	Shanghai PMF Pictures	
2022	Lighting Up the Stars	Lian Ray Pictures, Hengdian Entertainment Co., Ltd., China Film Co., Ltd.	
2022	Moon Man	Zhejiang FunAge Pictures Co., Ltd., China Film Co., Ltd., Alibaba Pictures, Shanghai Ruyi Film and Television Production Co., Ltd., Tianjin Maoyan Weiying Culture Media, Xihongshi Film and Television Culture (Tianjin) Co., Ltd.	
2022	Home Coming	Shanghai Huace Film Co., Ltd., Shenzhen Yiyi Yiyi Culture Media Co., Ltd., GIFilm Beijing Studio Co., Ltd., Beijing Free Cool Whale Film Co., Ltd.	
2023	The Wandering Earth 2	China Film Co., Ltd., GIFilm Beijing Studio Co., Ltd., Beijing Dengfeng International Culture Communication Co., Ltd., CFC Pictures Limited	
2023	Full River Red	Huanxi Media	Tianjin Maoyan Weiying Culture Media
2023	Boonie Bears: Guardian Code	Fantawild, Hengdian Entertainment Co., Ltd., China Film Co., Ltd., Lian Ray Pictures, Tianjin Maoyan Weiying Culture Media Co., Ltd.	
2023	Fast X	Universal Pictures, Original Film, One Race Films, Roth/Kirschenbaum Films, Perfect Storm Entertainment, China Film Co., Ltd.	Universal Pictures
2023	Chang'an	Light Chaser Animation Studios, Alibaba Pictures, Tianjin Maoyan Weiying Culture Media, China Film Co., Ltd.	
2023	Meg 2: The Trench	Warner Bros. Pictures, CMC Pictures, DF Pictures, di Bonaventura Pictures, Apelles Entertainment, China Film Co., Ltd., Alibaba Pictures	
2023	No More Bets	Dirty Monkeys (Shanghai) Culture Communication Ltd., Shanghai Ticketmaster Film&TV culture Co., Ltd., China Film Co., Ltd., Beijing Shanglion Culture Communication Co.	
2023	Snow Leopard	China Film Co., Ltd., Great Luck Films, OPEN Pictures, Qinghai Manishi Film Co., Ltd., iQIYI Pictures	
2023	The Volunteers: To the War	CFC Pictures Limited, China Film Co., Ltd., August First Film Studio, Beijing Rongyou Film & TV Culture Media, Beijing Bona Film Group Co., Ltd.	
2024	Pegasus 2	Shanghai PMF Pictures, Shanghai Taopiaopiao Film and Television Culture Co., Ltd., Tianjin Maoyan Weiying Culture Media Co., Ltd., Beijing Bona Film Group Co., Ltd., China Film Co., Ltd.	
2024	YOLO	New Classics Pictures, China Film Co., Ltd., Alibaba Pictures, Little M Media, Big Bowl Entertainment Culture Media Company Limited, Tencent Penguin Pictures	
2024	Article 20	Beijing Enlight Pictures, Center for Film & Television of the Supreme People's Procuratorate, Youth Enlight (Yangzhou) Pictures, Shanghai Ruyi Film and Television Production Co., Ltd., China Film Co., Ltd., Beijing Lifeng Culture Development Co., Ltd., Shanghai Guangjing Pictures, Shanghai Mini Enlight Pictures Co., Ltd., Zhejiang FunAge Pictures Co., Ltd., TF Enteralnment, Beijing Qiuhao Pictures Co., Ltd., MetaWay Art & Technology Co., Ltd.	
2024	Boonie Bears: Time Twist	Fantawild, Hengdian Entertainment Co., Ltd., China Film Co., Ltd., Tianjin Maoyan Weiying Culture Media Co., Ltd., Lian Ray Pictures, Shanghai Ruyi Film and Television Production Co., Ltd.	
2025	Dead to Rights	China Film Group Co., Ltd.	
2025	The Volunteers: Peace at Last	CFC Pictures Limited, China Film Group Co., Ltd., August First Film Studio, Beijing Rongyou Film & TV Culture Media, Beijing Bona Film Group Co., Ltd.	
2026	Blades of the Guardians	Woo Ping Pictures; Beijing Damai Entertainment; Beijing Dengfeng International Culture Communications Company; Mengqi Film; Eagle Media; Amazing Box; Huaxia Film; China Film Group Co., Ltd.	

== See also ==
- China Film Group Corporation
- Cinema of China
