= Huhu Studios =

Defunct New Zealand animation studio

Huhu Studios Limited
- Type: Private
- Industry: Animation, computer graphics
- Founded: 1996; 30 years ago
- Defunct: 26 December 2022; 3 years ago
- Fate: Liquidation
- Headquarters: Warkworth, New Zealand
- Key people: Trevor Yaxley (founder and CEO)
- Products: Animated feature films, television series
- Services: CGI, outsourced animation production
- Number of employees: ~100 (at peak)
- Website: huhustudios.com

Huhu Studios Limited was a New Zealand computer animation studio headquartered in Warkworth, in the Auckland Region. Founded in 1996 by Trevor Yaxley, the company provided outsourced CGI animation services for international television shows and direct-to-video franchises—most notably Big Idea Entertainment's VeggieTales and Max Lucado's Hermie and Friends—before pivoting to proprietary feature films.

In 2019, Huhu Studios released Mosley, the first official animated co-production between New Zealand and China under bilateral treaty agreements. Due to production halts, travel bans, and financial constraints triggered by the COVID-19 pandemic, the company ceased operations and entered liquidation in December 2022.

== History ==
=== Formation and service work (1996–2013) ===
Huhu Studios was founded in 1996 by entrepreneur Trevor Yaxley in rural Warkworth, north of Auckland. Initially established as a boutique animation house, the studio built its business model around digital ink-and-paint and emerging 3D computer graphics for overseas family and faith-based media distributors.

Throughout the 2000s and early 2010s, Huhu functioned as a primary subcontracted animation facility for major American direct-to-video productions. Between 2004 and 2005, it animated five direct-to-video episodes of Tommy Nelson's Hermie and Friends. In 2007, Huhu provided character modeling and stage animation for Promenade Pictures' computer-animated feature The Ten Commandments. From 2009 to 2015, the studio completed bulk CG animation on more than a dozen home video releases of Big Idea's flagship franchise VeggieTales, including Pistachio – The Little Boy That Woodn't (2010) and The Little Drummer Boy (2011). During this era, Huhu also co-produced television series including Turbo Dogs (with CCI Entertainment and Scholastic) and Buzz and Poppy.

=== China joint ventures and *Mosley* (2014–2019) ===
In 2014, Huhu sought to transition from work-for-hire contracts to intellectual property development. Capitalising on the official New Zealand–China Film Co-production Agreement signed in 2010, the company established satellite development offices in Beijing and opened a digital production pipeline in Nanning, Guangxi. In May 2015, Huhu signed a strategic multi-picture development agreement alongside China Film Group subsidiary China Film Animation and Canadian co-production partners to fund a slate of animated features.

The studio's flagship co-production, Mosley, was directed and written by animator Kirby Atkins. Co-produced with China Film Animation and financed in part by the New Zealand Film Commission, the film took over two decades of development and five years of active production across Warkworth and China. Featuring voice work by Atkins, Rhys Darby, Lucy Lawless, and John Rhys-Davies, Mosley premiered at the New Zealand International Film Festival in July 2019 and received general theatrical distribution in October 2019. The film was nominated for Best Animated Feature at the 13th Asia Pacific Screen Awards.

=== Pandemic disruptions and liquidation (2020–2022) ===
Following the release of Mosley, Huhu maintained a workforce of approximately 100 animators, technicians, and production staff across its New Zealand and Chinese hubs. However, the onset of the COVID-19 pandemic in early 2020 resulted in prolonged border closures, supply disruptions, and international travel restrictions between New Zealand and mainland China. Collaborative pipelines between Warkworth and Chinese animation facilities stalled, disrupting scheduled film slates and triggering substantial revenue shortfalls.

Management initially attempted to mothball the Warkworth studio facilities with plans to resume operations once border policies normalised. Ongoing pandemic restrictions and debt overheads made reopening unviable, and Huhu Studios Limited was placed into formal liquidation on 26 December 2022.

== Productions ==
=== Feature films ===
Year	Title	Co-producer(s)	Notes
2007	The Ten Commandments	Promenade Pictures	Animation production services
2019	Mosley	China Film Animation	First NZ–China co-production treaty feature

=== Television and direct-to-video series ===
Years	Title	Client / Co-producer	Notes
1999–2001	Buzz and Poppy	Young & Alive Productions	Television series
2003–2008	Life at the Pond	Inland Empire Christian Resources	Direct-to-video series
2004–2005	Hermie and Friends	Tommy Nelson	Direct-to-video series (5 episodes)
2008–2011	Turbo Dogs	CCI Entertainment / Scholastic	Television series
2009–2015	VeggieTales	Big Idea Entertainment	Direct-to-video episodes & television specials
2017	Sindbad & the 7 Galaxies	Creative Media Partners	Television series
