= China Film Group Corporation =

Chinese state-owned film company

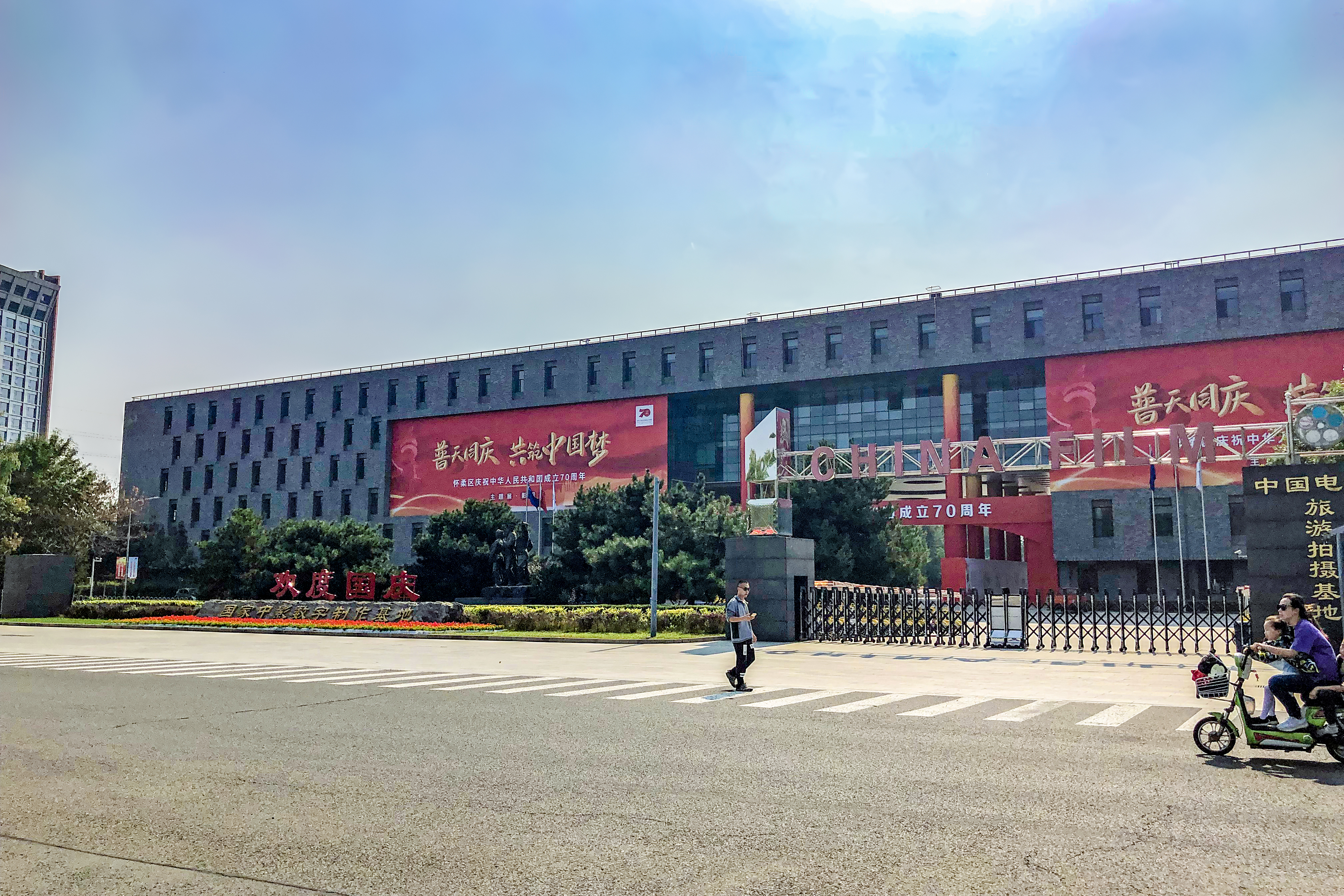
- The studio of China Film Group in Yangsong, Huairou District, Beijing
- Native name: 中国电影集团公司
- Type: Party-owned enterprise
- Traded as: SSE: 600977
- Industry: Cinema
- Founded: February 1999
- Headquarters: Beijing, China
- Key people: Han Sanping, Zhang Qiang
- Products: Films
- Parent: Central Propaganda Department of the Chinese Communist Party
- Subsidiaries: China Film Animation
- Website: chinafilm.com

China Film Group Corporation
- Simplified Chinese: 中国电影集团公司
- Traditional Chinese: 中國電影集團公司
Transcriptions
Standard Mandarin
- Hanyu Pinyin: Zhōngguó diànyǐng jítuán gōngsī
- Wade–Giles: ChungKuoTienYing ChiT'uan KungSsu
- Yale Romanization: JungGwoDyanYing JiTwan GungSz

China Film Group Corporation (CFGC) is a Chinese film production and distribution company. It is the largest, most influential film enterprise in the country, owned by the Central Publicity Department of the Chinese Communist Party. According to Forbes, it is a state monopoly, producing and distributing films while also regulating all imported films. In 2014, the company was the largest film distributor in China, with 32.8% of the market.

== History ==
The predecessor China Film Corporation was established in 1949. For 40 years until the end of 1992, China Film Import & Export Corporation was the only film buyer and distributor in China. From 1 January 1993, 16 other Chinese film studios became responsible for distributing their own films. In March 1994, China Film announced that it was willing to enter into revenue sharing deals with foreign distributors rather than buying a limited number of foreign films for a low, flat fee. In September 1994, the first deal with a US studio, Warner Bros. was announced. In 1999, the corporation became known as the China Film Group Corporation. It remained one of the only importers of foreign films in China besides Huaxia Film Distribution and is a major exporter of Chinese films.

== Businesses ==
China Film Group Corporation is involved in a variety of businesses which include film and television production, film distribution and exhibition, film importation and exportation, cinema circuit management, digital cinema construction, print developing and processing, film equipment management, film and TV CD production, ancillary products, advertising, property management as well as real estate. China Film Group Corporation partnered with Crest Digital in 2007, building a 15,000-square-meter state-of-the-art DVD and CD manufacturing facility outside Beijing.

Along with the China Research Institute of Film Science & Technology, the group created DMAX, a large-screen film format developed to break IMAX's large-screen monopoly in China.

== Subsidiaries ==
For over a decade, China Film Group's subsidiary, China Film Import & Export Corporation, has been the sole government-authorized importer of films. Another CFG subsidiary, China Film Co-production Corporation, is charged by the SARFT to oversee and manage all Sino-foreign co-productions.

China Film Group's film and TV production units include: the former China Film Corporation, Beijing Film Studio, China Youth Film Studio, China Film Co-Production Corporation, China Film Equipment Corporation, Movie Channel Production Center, Beijing Film & Video Laboratory and Huayun Film & TV Compact Disk Co., Ltd. The company has an animation division called China Film Animation.

=== China Film Co-Production Corporation ===
The China Film Co-Production Corporation (Chinese: 中国电影合作制片公司), abbreviated as CFCC, was founded in August 1979.

== Films ==
Each year, China Film Group produces more than 30 feature-length films, 400 TV plays, and 100 telefilms. Its films include The Warlords, Three Kingdoms: Resurrection of the Dragon, Kung Fu Hustle, Golden Bear winner Tuya's Marriage, and Protégé.

=== Filmography ===
Release date	Title	Produced by	Distributed by
2002	Hero	Sil-Metropole Organisation, Elite Group Enterprises, Zhang Yimou Studio, Beijing New Picture Film	Beijing New Picture Film
2007	Four Little Shaolin Kongfu Stars	Henan Film Studio, China Film Group	Razor Digital Entertainment, China Film Group
2017	Animal Crackers	Blue Dream Studios, Storyoscopic Films, Odin's Eye Animation, Mayday Movies, Exit Strategy, Beijing Wen Hua Dongrun Investment Co.	Netflix

== See also ==
- Cinema of China
- Mosfilm
