= List of adventure films of the 2010s =

Below is a list of adventure films released in the 2010s.

== 2010 ==
Title	Director	Cast	Country	Subgenre/notes
13 Assassins	Takashi Miike	Koji Yakusho, Takayuki Yamada, Yusuke Iseya	Japan	
600 kilos d'or pur	Éric Besnard	Clovis Cornillac, Audrey Dana, Patrick Chesnais, Claudio Santamaria	France	
The 7 Adventures of Sinbad	Adam Silver, Ben Hayflick	Patrick Muldoon, Sarah Desage, Bo Svenson	United States	
The Adventures of Fiyah Dog	Jeremy Garza	Jeremy Garza	U.S. Virgin Islands	
Agadez: the Music and the Rebellion	Ron Wyman	Jeremy Keenan, Omara Moctar	Niger	Documentary
Alice In Wonderland	Tim Burton	Johnny Depp, Anne Hathaway, Helena Bonham Carter	United States	
Bruc	Daniel Benmayor	Juan José Ballesta, Vincent Perez, Àstrid Bergès-Frisbey	Spain	
Centurion	Neil Marshall	Michael Fassbender, Olga Kurylenko, Dominic West	United Kingdom; United States	
The Chronicles of Narnia: The Voyage of the Dawn Treader	Michael Apted	Ben Barnes, Skandar Keynes, Georgie Henley	United States	Fantasy adventure
Clash of the Titans	Louis Leterrier	Sam Worthington, Liam Neeson, Ralph Fiennes	United States	Fantasy adventure
The Expendables	Sylvester Stallone	Sylvester Stallone, Jason Statham, Jet Li, Dolph Lundgren, Mickey Rourke	United States	War adventure
The Extraordinary Adventures of Adèle Blanc-Sec	Luc Besson	Louise Bourgoin, Mathieu Amalric, Gilles Lellouche	France	
Gulliver's Travels	Rob Letterman	Jack Black, Jason Segel, Emily Blunt	United States	Fantasy adventure
Harry Potter and the Deathly Hallows – Part 1	David Yates	Daniel Radcliffe, Rupert Grint, Emma Watson	United Kingdom; United States	Fantasy adventure
Inception	Christopher Nolan	Leonardo DiCaprio, Joseph Gordon-Levitt, Elliot Page	United States	
The Karate Kid	Harald Zwart	Jaden Smith, Jackie Chan	United States; China	
The Last Airbender	M. Night Shyamalan	Noah Ringer, Nicola Peltz, Dev Patel	United States	Fantasy adventure
Legend of the Guardians: The Owls of Ga'Hoole	Zack Snyder	Jim Sturgess (voice), Joel Edgerton (voice), Geoffrey Rush (voice), Hugo Weaving (voice)	United States; Australia	Fantasy adventure
The Lost Future	Mikael Salomon	Sean Bean	South Africa; Germany	Science fiction adventure
Nanga Parbat	Joseph Vilsmaier	Florian Stetter, Andreas Tobias, Karl Markovics	Germany	
Percy Jackson & the Olympians: The Lightning Thief	Chris Columbus	Logan Lerman, Brandon T Jackson, Alexandra Daddario	United States	
Prince of Persia: The Sands of Time	Mike Newell	Jake Gyllenhaal, Gemma Arterton, Ben Kingsley	United States	Fantasy adventure
Robin Hood	Ridley Scott	Russell Crowe, Cate Blanchett, William Hurt, Max von Sydow	United States	
Son of Babylon	Mohamed Al-Daradji	Shazada Hussein, Yasser Talib	Iraq	
The Sorcerer's Apprentice	Jon Turteltaub	Nicolas Cage, Jay Baruchel, Alfred Molina	United States	Fantasy adventure
Spear of Destiny	Florian Baxmeyer	Kai Wiesinger, Bettina Zimmermann, Fabian Busch, Jürgen Prochnow	Germany	
Thomas & Friends: Misty Island Rescue	Greg Tiernan	Ben Small, Martin Sherman, Jules de Jongh, William Hope, David Bedella, Glenn Wrage, Keith Wickham, Teresa Gallagher, Togo Igawa, Kerry Shale, Matt Wilkinson, Michael Angelis, Michael Brandon	United Kingdom	Computer-animation
Tomorrow, When the War Began	Stuart Beattie	Caitlin Stasey, Rachel Hurd-Wood, Phoebe Tonkin	Australia	Adventure drama
Toy Story 3	Lee Unkrich	Tom Hanks (voice), Tim Allen (voice), Joan Cusack (voice)	United States	Animated film, family-oriented adventure
Tron: Legacy	Joseph Kosinski	Jeff Bridges, Garrett Hedlund, Olivia Wilde, Bruce Boxleitner	United States	Science fiction adventure
The Way Back	Peter Weir	Colin Farrell, Ed Harris, Jim Sturgess, Saoirse Ronan	United States	

== 2011 ==
Title	Director	Cast	Country	Subgenre/notes
The Adventures of Tintin: The Secret of the Unicorn	Steven Spielberg	Jamie Bell (motion capture), Andy Serkis (motion capture), Daniel Craig (motion capture)	United States	Animated film, family-oriented adventure
Age of the Dragons	Ryan Little	Danny Glover, Vinnie Jones	United States	Fantasy adventure
Águila Roja: la película	José Ramón Ayerra Díaz	David Janer	Spain	
Les Aventures de Philibert, capitaine puceau	Sylvain Fusée	Jérémie Renier, Alexandre Astier, Élodie Navarre, Manu Payet	France	Adventure comedy
Black Gold	Jean-Jacques Annaud	Tahar Rahim, Antonio Banderas, Mark Strong, Freida Pinto, Jan Uddin, Riz Ahmed	Qatar; Tunisia; France; Italy	
El Capitán Trueno y el Santo Grial	Antonio Hernández	Sergio Peris-Mencheta, Natasha Yarovenko	Spain	
Cars 2	John Lasseter	Owen Wilson (voice), Larry the Cable Guy (voice), Michael Caine (voice)	United States	Animated film, family-oriented adventure
Conan the Barbarian	Marcus Nispel	Jason Momoa, Stephen Lang, Rachel Nichols	United States	
Deep Gold	Michael Gleissner	Bebe Pham	Philippines; United States	Sea adventure
Dolphin Tale	Charles Martin Smith	Nathan Gamble, Morgan Freeman, Harry Connick Jr.	United States	Family-oriented adventure
Dragon Crusaders	Mark Atkins	Dylan Jones, Cecily Fay, Feth Greenwood	United States	Fantasy adventure
The Eagle	Kevin Macdonald	Channing Tatum, Jamie Bell, Mark Strong, Donald Sutherland	United Kingdom	
The Grey	Joe Carnahan	Liam Neeson	United States	Adventure drama
Harry Potter and the Deathly Hallows: Part II	David Yates	Daniel Radcliffe, Rupert Grint, Emma Watson	United States	Fantasy adventure
The Hunter	Daniel Nettheim	Willem Dafoe, Frances O'Connor, Sam Neill	Australia	Adventure drama
Immortals	Tarsem Singh	Henry Cavill, Mickey Rourke, Freida Pinto	United States	
Ironclad	Jonathan English	James Purefoy, Brian Cox, Kate Mara, Derek Jacobi, Paul Giamatti, Charles Dance	United Kingdom; United States	
Johnny English Reborn	Oliver Parker	Rowan Atkinson, Dominic West, Gillian Anderson, Rosamund Pike	United Kingdom	
Jungle Child	Roland Suso Richter	Stella Kunkat, Thomas Kretschmann, Nadja Uhl	Germany	
A Lonely Place to Die	Julian Gilbey	Melissa George, Ed Speleers, Sean Harris, Karel Roden, Alec Newman	United Kingdom	
The Lost Medallion: The Adventures of Billy Stone	Bill Muir	Alex Kendrick, James Hong, Mark Dacascos, Sammi Hanratty, Billy Unger	United States	Family-oriented adventure
Machine Gun Preacher	Marc Forster	Gerard Butler	United States	Adventure drama
The Malay Chronicles: Bloodlines	Yusry Kru	Stephen Rahman Hughes, Gavin Stenhouse, Jing Lusi	Malaysia	
Mars Needs Moms	Simon Wells		United States	Animated film, adventure comedy
Mercenaries	Paris Leonti	Billy Zane, Robert Fucilla	United Kingdom	
The Mirror Boy	Obi Emelonye	Trew Sider, Genevieve Nnaji, Osita Iheme	Nigeria; The Gambia; United Kingdom	
Myn Bala	Akan Satayev	Kuralay Anabekova, Aliya Anuarbek, Asylkhan Topelov	Kazakhstan	
Oka!	Lavinia Currier	Kris Marshall, Isaach de Bankolé, Will Yun Lee	United States	
Pirates of the Caribbean: On Stranger Tides	Rob Marshall	Johnny Depp, Penélope Cruz, Geoffrey Rush, Ian McShane	United States	Pirate film
Puss in Boots	Chris Miller	Antonio Banderas (voice), Salma Hayek (voice), Zach Galifianakis (voice)	United States	Animated film, family-oriented adventure
The Rabbi's Cat	Joann Sfar, Antoine Delesvaux		France	Animated film
Rango	Gore Verbinski	Johnny Depp (voice), Abigail Breslin (voice), Alfred Molina (voice)	United States	Animated film, family-oriented adventure
Rio	Carlos Saldanha	Jesse Eisenberg (voice), Anne Hathaway (voice), Jemaine Clement (voice)	United States	Animated film, family-oriented adventure
Rise of the Planet of the Apes	Rupert Wyatt	James Franco, Freida Pinto, Andy Serkis (voice)	United States	
Ronal the Barbarian	Kresten Vestbjerg Andersen, Thorbjørn Christoffersen		Denmark	Animated film
Sanctum	Alister Grierson	Richard Roxburgh, Rhys Wakefield, Ioan Gruffudd	United States	Adventure drama
Saving Private Perez	Beto Gómez	Miguel Rodarte, Jesus Ochoa, Joaquín Cosío	Mexico	
Season of the Witch	Dominic Sena	Nicolas Cage, Ron Perlman, Claire Foy, Christopher Lee	United States	
Shaolin	Benny Chan	Andy Lau, Nicolas Tse, Jackie Chan	China; Hong Kong	
Sinbad and The Minotaur	Karl Zwicky	Manu Bennett, Holly Brisley	Australia	
Smugglers' Songs	Rabah Ameur-Zaïmeche	Jacques Nolot, Christian Milia-Darmezin, Kenji Levan	France	
Spy Kids: All the Time in the World	Robert Rodriguez	Jessica Alba, Joel McHale, Jeremy Piven	United States	
Thor	Kenneth Branagh	Chris Hemsworth, Natalie Portman, Tom Hiddleston, Anthony Hopkins	United States	Fantasy adventure, superhero film
The Three Musketeers	Paul W. S. Anderson	Logan Lerman, Milla Jovovich, Matthew Macfadyen, Christoph Waltz, Orlando Bloom, Mads Mikkelsen, Luke Evans, Ray Stevenson	France	
Treasure Guards	Iain B. MacDonald	Anna Friel, Raoul Bova	Germany; South Africa	
Vicky and the Treasure of the Gods	Christian Ditter	Jonas Hämmerle, Waldemar Kobus	Germany	
The Warring States	Chen Jin	Sun Honglei, Jing Tian	China	
Winnie the Pooh	Don Hall, Stephen Anderson		United States	Animated film, family-oriented adventure
Your Highness	David Gordon Green	Natalie Portman, James Franco, Danny McBride	United States	Adventure comedy

== 2012 ==
Title	Director	Cast	Country	Subgenre/notes
2012: Kurse a di Xtabai	Matthiew Klinck	Miriam Antoinette-Ochaeta, Jim Goodchild Arnold	Belize	
The Avengers	Joss Whedon	Robert Downey Jr., Chris Evans, Scarlett Johansson, Chris Hemsworth, Samuel L. Jackson	United States	Superhero film
Battleship	Peter Berg	Taylor Kitsch, Alexander Skarsgård, Rihanna	United States	War adventure
Big Miracle	Ken Kwapis	John Krasinski, Drew Barrymore, Kristen Bell	United States	
Brave	Brenda Chapman, Mark Andrews	Kelly Macdonald (voice), Emma Thompson (voice), Billy Connolly (voice)	United States	Animated film, family-oriented adventure
Clash of the Empires	Joseph Lawson	Bai Ling, Khom Lyly, Christopher Judge	United States	Fantasy adventure
Dark Tide	John Stockwell	Halle Berry, Olivier Martinez	United States; United Kingdom; South Africa	
The Day of the Siege: September Eleven 1683	Renzo Martinelli	F. Murray Abraham, Enrico Lo Verso, Alicja Bachleda, Jerzy Skolimowski, Piotr Adamczyk	Poland; Italy	
The Deep	Baltasar Kormákur	Ólafur Darri Ólafsson	Iceland	
The Dinosaur Project	Sid Bennett	Richard Dillane, Peter Brooke, Matthew Kane	United Kingdom	
An Enemy To Die For	Peter Dalle	Tom Burke, Allan Corduner, Jeanette Hain, Sven Nordin, Axel Prahl, Richard Ulfsäter	Sweden; Germany	Sea adventure, arctic adventure
Fetih 1453	Faruk Aksoy	Devrim Evin, İbrahim Çelikkol, Dilek Serbest	Turkey	
God Loves Caviar	Yannis Smaragdis	Sebastian Koch, Evgeniy Stychkin, Juan Diego Botto, Olga Sutulova, John Cleese, Catherine Deneuve	Greece; Russia	
The Hobbit: An Unexpected Journey	Peter Jackson	Ian McKellen, Martin Freeman, Richard Armitage	New Zealand; United States	Fantasy adventure
HOUBA! On the Trail of the Marsupilami	Alain Chabat	Jamel Debbouze, Alain Chabat, Lambert Wilson	France; Belgium	
The Hunger Games	Gary Ross	Jennifer Lawrence, Josh Hutcherson, Liam Hemsworth, Woody Harrelson	United States	
The Hunt for the Amber Room	Florian Baxmeyer	Kai Wiesinger, Bettina Zimmermann, Fabian Busch	Germany	
Ice Age: Continental Drift	Michael Thurmeier, Steve Martino	Ray Romano (voice), John Leguizamo (voice), Denis Leary (voice)	United States	Animated film, family-oriented adventure
Inseln vor dem Wind	Dietmar Klein	Muriel Baumeister, Thure Riefenstein, Max Tidof	Germany	Sea adventure
John Carter	Andrew Stanton	Taylor Kitsch, Lynn Collins, Samantha Morton, Willem Dafoe	United States	Fantasy adventure, science fiction adventure
Journey 2: The Mysterious Island	Brad Peyton	Dwayne Johnson, Michael Caine, Josh Hutcherson	United States	Fantasy adventure
Kon-Tiki	Joachim Rønning, Espen Sandberg	Pål Sverre Valheim Hagen	Denmark; United Kingdom; Norway; Sweden; Germany	Sea adventure, adventure drama
Krishna Aur Kans	Vikram Veturi	Om Puri, Juhi Chawla, Prachi Save	India	Animated film
Life of Pi	Ang Lee	Suraj Sharma, Irfan Khan, Ayush Tandon	United States	Adventure drama
Measuring the World	Detlev Buck	Florian David Fitz, Albrecht Schuch	Germany	
The Pirates! In an Adventure with Scientists!	Peter Lord	Hugh Grant, Martin Freeman, Imelda Staunton, David Tennant, Jeremy Piven, Salma Hayek, Russell Tovey, Lenny Henry, Brendan Gleeson, Ashley Jensen, Ben Whitehead	United Kingdom	Animated film, family-oriented adventure
Red Tails	Anthony Hemingway	Terrence Howard, Cuba Gooding Jr., Nate Parker	United States	War adventure
Rise of the Guardians	Peter A. Ramsey	Chris Pine (voice), Alec Baldwin (voice), Hugh Jackman (voice)	United States	Animated film, family-oriented adventure
Snow White and the Huntsman	Rupert Sanders	Kristen Stewart, Charlize Theron, Chris Hemsworth	United States	
The Sound of Crickets at Night (Ainikien Jidjid ilo Bon)	Jack Niedenthal, Suzanne Chutaro	Salome Fakatou, Alson Kelen, Jack Niedenthal, Banjo Joel, Karen Earshaw	Marshall Islands	family-oriented adventure
Tad, The Lost Explorer	Enrique Gato		Spain	Animated film, family-oriented adventure
Wrath of the Titans	Jonathan Liebesman	Sam Worthington, Liam Neeson, Ralph Fiennes	Spain; United States	Fantasy adventure
Zambezia	Wayne Thornley	Jeremy Suarez (voice), Samuel L. Jackson (voice), Abigail Breslin (voice), Leonard Nimoy (voice), Jeff Goldblum (voice)	South Africa	

== 2013 ==
Title	Director	Cast	Country	Subgenre/notes
47 Ronin	Carl Rinsch	Keanu Reeves, Hiroyuki Sanada, Rinko Kikuchi	United States	
After Earth	M. Night Shyamalan	Will Smith, Jaden Smith	United States	Science fiction adventure
The A.R.K. Report	Shmuel Hoffman	Katy Castaldi, Pascal Yen-Pfister, Ayden Crispe	Israel; United States	Short film
The Adventurer: The Curse of the Midas Box	Jonathan Newman	Michael Sheen, Sam Neill, Lena Headey, Aneurin Barnard	United Kingdom; Spain; Belgium	
All Is Lost	J. C. Chandor	Robert Redford	United States	Adventure drama
Angélique	Ariel Zeitoun	Nora Arnezeder, Gérard Lanvin, Tomer Sisley	France	
Captain Phillips	Paul Greengrass	Tom Hanks, Barkhad Abdi	United States	Sea adventure
Collision	David Marconi	Frank Grillo, Jaimie Alexander, Roschdy Zem	France	Adventure drama
The Croods	Kirk DeMicco, Chris Sanders	Nicolas Cage (voice), Ryan Reynolds (voice), Emma Stone (voice)	United States	Animated film, family-oriented adventure
Ender's Game	Gavin Hood	Asa Butterfield, Harrison Ford	United States	
Epic	Chris Wedge	Colin Farrell (voice), Josh Hutcherson (voice), Amanda Seyfried (voice), Christoph Waltz (voice)	United States	Animated film, fantasy adventure
Hammer of the Gods	Farren Blackburn	Charlie Bewley, Alexandra Dowling, Glynis Barber	United Kingdom	Adventure drama
Hansel & Gretel: Witch Hunters	Tommy Wirkola	Jeremy Renner, Gemma Arterton, Famke Janssen, Peter Stormare	United States; Germany	
Heatstroke	Evelyn Purcell	Maisie Williams, Svetlana Metkina, Stephen Dorff, Peter Stormare	United States; South Africa	
The Hobbit: The Desolation of Smaug	Peter Jackson	Ian McKellen, Martin Freeman, Richard Armitage	New Zealand; United States	Fantasy adventure
The Hunger Games: Catching Fire	Francis Lawrence	Jennifer Lawrence, Josh Hutcherson, Liam Hemsworth, Woody Harrelson	United States	
Jack the Giant Slayer	Bryan Singer	Nicholas Hoult, Eleanor Tomlinson, Stanley Tucci	United States	Fantasy adventure
Jonah	Ewa Headley, Kay Headley	Daniel Kaluuya	United Kingdom; Tanzania	
Justin and the Knights of Valour	Manuel Sicilia		Spain	Animated film
The Lone Ranger	Gore Verbinski	Johnny Depp, Armie Hammer	United States	
Man of Steel	Zack Snyder	Henry Cavill, Amy Adams	United States	
Open Desert	Robert Krause	Jennifer Ulrich, August Wittgenstein, Leon Ockenden	Germany	
Oz the Great and Powerful	Sam Raimi	James Franco, Mila Kunis, Michelle Williams	United States	Fantasy adventure
Pacific Rim	Guillermo del Toro	Idris Elba, Charlie Hunnam, Rinko Kikuchi, Clifton Collins Jr.	United States	
The Physician	Philipp Stölzl	Tom Payne, Stellan Skarsgård, Ben Kingsley	Germany	
Return to Nim's Island	Brendan Maher	Bindi Irwin, Toby Wallace, John Waters	Australia	Family-oriented adventure
Richard the Lionheart	Stefano Milla	Malcolm McDowell, Chandler Maness	United States	
The Secret Life of Walter Mitty	Ben Stiller	Ben Stiller, Kristen Wiig, Patton Oswalt	United States	Adventure comedy
Star Trek Into Darkness	J. J. Abrams	Chris Pine, Zachary Quinto, Zoe Saldaña	United States	Space adventure
Tarzan	Reinhard Klooss		Germany; United States	Animated film
The Three Musketeers	Sergey Zhigunov	Rinal Mukhametov, Yuri Chursin, Ekaterina Vilkova	Russia	
Thor: The Dark World	Alan Taylor	Chris Hemsworth, Natalie Portman, Tom Hiddleston	United States	Fantasy adventure, superhero film
Tracks	John Curran	Mia Wasikowska, Adam Driver	Australia	
Turning Tide	Christophe Offenstein	François Cluzet	France	
The Ultimate Task	Sun Lijun	Xie Na (voice), Lu Zhixing (voice), Han Tongsheng (voice)	China	Animated film, adventure comedy drama
Vikingdom	Yusry Abdul Halim	Dominic Purcell	Malaysia; United States	Fantasy adventure
Walking with Dinosaurs	Neil Nightingale and Barry Cook	John Leguizamo, Justin Long, Tiya Sircar, Skyler Stone, Angourie Rice	United Kingdom; United States; Australia; India	Family-oriented adventure
Welcome to the Jungle	Rob Meltzer	Jean-Claude Van Damme, Adam Brody, Megan Boone	United States	Adventure comedy

== 2014 ==
Title	Director	Cast	Country	Subgenre/notes
300: Rise of an Empire	Noam Murro	Sullivan Stapleton, Eva Green, Lena Headey	United States	
The Admiral: Roaring Currents	Kim Han-min	Choi Min-sik	South Korea	
Big Game	Jalmari Helander	Samuel L. Jackson, Onni Tommila	Finland	
Black Sea	Kevin Macdonald	Jude Law, Konstantin Khabensky, Grigoriy Dobrygin	United States; United Kingdom	
Christmas Icetastrophe	Jonathan Winfrey	Victor Webster, Jennifer Spence, Richard Harmon	United States	Television film
Cub	Jonas Govaerts	Stef Aerts, Evelien Bosmans, Ricko Otto	Belgium	Horror adventure
Dracula Untold	Gary Shore	Luke Evans, Sarah Gadon, Dominic Cooper	United States	Fantasy adventure
Exodus: Gods and Kings	Ridley Scott	John Turturro, Christian Bale, Sigourney Weaver, Ben Kingsley, Joel Edgerton	United States	
Farm House II	Kerr Xu	Shen Dawei (voice), Feng Junhua (voice), Cu Cu (voice)	China	Animated film, family adventure comedy
The Grand Budapest Hotel	Wes Anderson	Ralph Fiennes, Tony Revolori	United States; Germany	
Guardians of the Galaxy	James Gunn	Chris Pratt, Zoe Saldaña, Dave Bautista, Vin Diesel (voice), Bradley Cooper (voice)	United States	Space adventure
Hector and the Search for Happiness	Peter Chelsom	Simon Pegg, Rosamund Pike, Toni Collette, Stellan Skarsgård, Christopher Plummer, Jean Reno	United Kingdom	
Hercules	Brett Ratner	Dwayne Johnson	United States	
The Hunger Games: Mockingjay – Part 1	Francis Lawrence	Jennifer Lawrence, Josh Hutcherson, Liam Hemsworth, Woody Harrelson	United States	
Interstellar	Christopher Nolan	Matthew McConaughey, Anne Hathaway, Jessica Chastain	United States	Science fiction adventure
Into the Woods	Rob Marshall	Anna Kendrick, Chris Pine, Emily Blunt, Meryl Streep, Johnny Depp, James Corden	United States	
Ironclad: Battle for Blood	Jonathan English	Tom Austen, Tom Rhys Harries, Michelle Fairley	United Kingdom; Serbia	Adventure drama
Jeff Dunham: All Over the Map	Rob Dipple	Jeff Dunham	United States	
Jilel: The Calling of the Shell	Suzanne Chutaro, Jack Niedenthal	Niten Anni, Tolfina Fakatou, Netha Gideon	Marshall Islands	
Kenau	Maarten Treurniet	Monic Hendrickx, Barry Atsma, Sallie Harmsen	Netherlands; Belgium; Hungary	
Kuiba 3	Wang Chuan, Zhang Gang, Zhou Jie	Liu Jingluo (voice), Yao Shu (voice), Wang Yuteng (voice)	China	Animated film, fantasy action adventure
The Legend of Hercules	Renny Harlin	Kellan Lutz, Gaia Weiss, Scott Adkins	United States	
Lomasankarit	Taavi Vartia	Nuutti Konttinen, Emil Auno, Veikka Vainikka, Laura Malmivaara	Finland; Greece	
The Lost 15 Boys: The Big Adventure on Pirates' Island	Xiaohan, et al.	Li Miao (voice), Yu Peixuan (voice), Zhou Yongxi (voice)	China; Japan	Animated film
Maleficent	Robert Stromberg	Angelina Jolie, Elle Fanning, Sharlto Copley, Imelda Staunton	United States	
The Maze Runner	Wes Ball	Dylan O'Brien, Thomas Sangster	United States	
Mystery	Wu Bing	Ady An, Jiro Wang, Guo Degang	China	Suspense thriller
Noah	Darren Aronofsky	Russell Crowe	United States	
Northmen: A Viking Saga	Claudio Fäh	Tom Hopper, Ryan Kwanten, Ken Duken, Charlie Murphy	Switzerland; South Africa; Germany	
Outcast	Nick Powell	Nicolas Cage, Hayden Christensen	Canada; China	
Pompeii	Paul W. S. Anderson	Kit Harington, Emily Browning, Adewale Akinnuoye-Agbaje, Kiefer Sutherland	United States; Canada; Germany	
The Pirates	Lee Seok-hoon	Son Ye-jin, Kim Nam-gil	South Korea	
The Pyramid	Grégory Levasseur	Ashley Hinshaw, Denis O'Hare, James Buckley	France	
Seventh Son	Sergei Bodrov	Jeff Bridges, Ben Barnes, Julianne Moore	United States; France	
Theeb	Naji Abu Nowar	Jacir Eid, Hassan Mutlag, Hussein Salameh	Jordan; United Kingdom; United Arab Emirates; Qatar	
Tomb Robber	Yu Dao	Michael Tong, Muqi Miya, Li Bingyuan	China	Action adventure suspense thriller
Transformers: Age of Extinction	Michael Bay	Mark Wahlberg, Jack Reynor, Nicola Peltz	United States	
Trash	Stephen Daldry	Wagner Moura, Rooney Mara, Martin Sheen, Selton Mello	Brazil; United Kingdom	Adventure drama
La Vie pure	Jeremy Banster	Stany Coppet, Aurélien Recoing, Elli Medeiros, Daniel Duval	France	
The Water Diviner	Russell Crowe	Russell Crowe, Olga Kurylenko, Yılmaz Erdoğan	Australia; United States	
When the Man Went South	Alex Bernstein	Barnie Duncan, Kevin Keys, Monalisa Tupoi	Tonga; United States	
The Wild Coast: An Exploration of the Guianas	David Whelan	Richard Taylor	United States; Trinidad and Tobago; Venezuela; Guyana; Suriname; French Guiana	
Wildlike	Ryan Darst	Ella Purnell, Bruce Greenwood, Brian Geraghty	United States	Adventure drama

== 2015 ==
Title	Director	Cast	Country	Subgenre/notes
108 Demon Kings	Pascal Morelli	Sylvain Mounier (voice), Melissa Cornu (voice), Hugues Hausma (voice)	France; United States; Luxembourg	Animated family adventure
Alibaba and the Thief	Zheng Chengfeng	Ye Fang (voice), Ding Yan (voice), Zhang Yang (voice)	China	Animated children's film
Avengers: Age of Ultron	Joss Whedon	Robert Downey Jr., Chris Hemsworth, Mark Ruffalo, Chris Evans, Scarlett Johansson	United States	
Bicycle Boy	Liu Kexin	Tang Xiaoxi (voice), Zhang Xueling (voice), Lu Zhixing (voice)	China	Animated fantasy
Boonie Bears: Mystical Winter	Ding Liang, Liu Fuyuan	Zhang Wei (voice), Zhang Bingjun (voice), Tan Xiao (voice)	China	Animated family adventure comedy
Brave Rabbit 2 Crazy Circus	Zeng Xianlin	Xiaoliansha (voice), Dingdang (voice), Hao Xianghai (voice)	China	Animated children's adventure comedy
Cinderella	Kenneth Branagh	Cate Blanchett, Lily James, Richard Madden	United Kingdom; United States	Live-action adaptation of the original animation of the same name
Eden	Shyam Madiraju	Nate Parker, Ethan Peck, Jessica Lowndes, Diego Boneta	United States	
Embrace of the Serpent	Ciro Guerra	Nilbio Torres, Antonio Bolívar, Jan Bijvoet, Brionne Davis	Colombia; Argentina; Venezuela	Adventure drama
Everest	Baltasar Kormákur	Jason Clarke, Jake Gyllenhaal, Josh Brolin, Keira Knightley, Emily Watson	United States; United Kingdom	
Fantastic Four	Josh Trank	Miles Teller, Michael B. Johnson, Kate Mara, Jamie Bell	United States	
The Grow 2	Ha Lei	Yu Li (voice), Wu Tian Hao (voice), Rong Rong (voice)	China	Animated adventure comedy
Happy Little Submarine Magic Box of Time	He Zili	Fan Churong (voice), Hong Haitian (voice), Xie Yuanzhen (voice)	China	Animated adventure
The Hunger Games: Mockingjay – Part 2	Francis Lawrence	Jennifer Lawrence, Josh Hutcherson, Liam Hemsworth	United States	
In the Heart of the Sea	Ron Howard	Chris Hemsworth, Benjamin Walker	United States; Spain	Sea adventure
The Invincible Piglet	Song Zhantao	Cheung Laap Wai, Zhang Zhilu, Norman Chu	China	Live action/animated children's fantasy adventure
Jupiter Ascending	The Wachowskis	Channing Tatum, Mila Kunis, Sean Bean	Australia; United States	Space adventure
Jurassic World	Colin Trevorrow	Chris Pratt, Bryce Dallas Howard	United States	
Kingsman: The Secret Service	Matthew Vaughn	Taron Egerton, Colin Firth, Michael Caine, Samuel L. Jackson	United States; United Kingdom	
Kung Fu Style	Xu Kerr	Huang Ying (voice), Cao Zhen (voice), Zhang Anqi (voice)	China	Animated action adventure comedy
Last Knights	Kazuaki Kiriya	Clive Owen, Morgan Freeman, Aksel Hennie	United States	
The Last Witch Hunter	Breck Eisner	Vin Diesel	United States	Fantasy adventure
Legend of the Moles – The Magic Train Adventure	Li Tingting	Yang Ou (voice), Xia Lei (voice), Xie Tiantian (voice)	China	Animated family adventure
Legend of a Rabbit: The Martial of Fire	Ma Yuan, Dong Dake	Huang Lei (voice), Yang Zishan (voice), He Yunwei (voice)	China	Animated action adventure
Long Way North	Rémi Chayé		France; Denmark	Animated film
Mad Max: Fury Road	George Miller	Tom Hardy, Charlize Theron, Hugh Keays-Byrne	Australia; United States	
Max	Boaz Yakin	Josh Wiggins, Thomas Haden Church, Jay Hernandez, Lauren Graham	United States	Family-oriented adventure
The Martian	Ridley Scott	Matt Damon	United States	Space adventure
Michiel de Ruyter	Roel Reiné	Frank Lammers	Netherlands	War adventure
Monster Hunt	Raman Hui	Bai Baihe, Kai Ko, Sandra Ng	China	Fantasy
The Mystery of Death	Ben Wong	Deric Wan, Huang Zheng, Josephine Yu	China	Adventure suspense thriller
Oddball	Stuart McDonald	Shane Jacobson, Coco Jack Gilles, Sarah Snook, Alan Tudyk	Australia	
Pan	Joe Wright	Levi Miller, Hugh Jackman, Garrett Hedlund, Rooney Mara, Amanda Seyfried	United States	Fantasy adventure
Point Break	Ericson Core	Édgar Ramírez, Luke Bracey, Teresa Palmer	United States; Germany; China	
Queen of the Desert	Werner Herzog	Nicole Kidman, James Franco, Robert Pattinson	United States; Morocco	
The Revenant	Alejandro G. Iñárritu	Leonardo DiCaprio, Tom Hardy	United States	Adventure drama
Secret Treasure	Ronald Cheng, Gordon Chan	Ronald Cheng, Dayo Wong, Fala Chen, Joyce Feng	China	Period piece
Spectre	Sam Mendes	Daniel Craig, Christoph Waltz, Léa Seydoux	United Kingdom	
The SpongeBob Movie: Sponge Out of Water	Paul Tibbitt	Tom Kenny (voice), Mr. Lawrence (voice), Clancy Brown (voice), Bill Fagerbakke (voice), Rodger Bumpass (voice), Carolyn Lawrence (voice), Antonio Banderas	United States	
Star Wars: The Force Awakens	J. J. Abrams	Harrison Ford, Mark Hamill, Carrie Fisher, Daisy Ridley, Adam Driver, John Boyega	United States	Space adventure
Tomorrowland	Brad Bird	George Clooney	United States	Science fiction adventure
The Walk	Robert Zemeckis	Joseph Gordon-Levitt, Ben Kingsley, Charlotte Le Bon	United States	Adventure drama
Xinnian Is Coming – Uproar of Chuxi	Yu Mingliang, Yang Xiaojun, Liang Donglong	Zhao Shuting (voice), Fu Jie (voice), Yi Xiaoyin (voice)	China	Animated fantasy adventure

== 2016 ==
Title	Director	Cast	Country	Subgenre/notes
Alice Through the Looking Glass	James Bobin	Mia Wasikowska, Johnny Depp, Helena Bonham Carter	United States	Fantasy adventure
Assassin's Creed	Justin Kurzel	Michael Fassbender, Marion Cotillard	United States	
Ben-Hur	Timur Bekmambetov	Jack Huston, Morgan Freeman, Toby Kebbell	United States	
Burn Your Maps	Jordan Roberts	Vera Farmiga, Jacob Tremblay	United States	
Cave	Henrik Martin Dahlsbakken	Heidi Toini, Mads Sjøgård Pettersen, Benjamin Helstad	Norway	
Crouching Tiger, Hidden Dragon: Sword of Destiny	Yuen Woo-ping	Michelle Yeoh, Donnie Yen, Jason Scott Lee	United States; China	
Fantastic Beasts and Where to Find Them	David Yates	Eddie Redmayne, Katherine Waterston, Ezra Miller	United Kingdom; United States	Fantasy adventure
The Finest Hours	Craig Gillespie	Ben Foster, Casey Affleck, Chris Pine, Eric Bana	United States	
Gods of Egypt	Alex Proyas	Brenton Thwaites, Nikolaj Coster-Waldau, Gerard Butler	United States; Australia	
Gold	Stephen Gaghan	Matthew McConaughey, Édgar Ramírez, Bryce Dallas Howard	United States	
The Great Wall	Zhang Yimou	Matt Damon	United States; China	
Hunt for the Wilderpeople	Taika Waititi	Julian Dennison, Sam Neill	New Zealand	
The Huntsman: Winter's War	Cedric Nicolas-Troyan	Chris Hemsworth, Charlize Theron, Emily Blunt	United States	Fantasy adventure
Ice Age: Collision Course	Mike Thurmeier and Galen T. Chu	Ray Romano (voice), John Leguizamo (voice), Denis Leary (voice)	United States	Animated film, family-oriented adventure
Independence Day: Resurgence	Roland Emmerich	Jeff Goldblum, Bill Pullman, Jessie Usher, Liam Hemsworth	United States	Science fiction adventure
Inferno	Ron Howard	Tom Hanks	United States	
The Jungle Book	Jon Favreau	Neel Sethi, Bill Murray (voice), Ben Kingsley (voice), Idris Elba (voice)	United States	Family-oriented adventure
Kicks	Justin Tipping	Jahking Guillory, Christopher Jordan Wallace	United States	Adventure drama
Kubo and the Two Strings	Travis Knight	Charlize Theron, Art Parkinson, Ralph Fiennes	United States	Animated fantasy adventure
Last Days in the Desert	Rodrigo García	Ewan McGregor	United States	
The Last King	Nils Gaup	Jakob Oftebro, Kristofer Hivju	Norway	Adventure drama
The Legend of Tarzan	David Yates	Alexander Skarsgård, Margot Robbie, Christoph Waltz, Samuel L. Jackson	United States	
Lion	Garth Davis	Dev Patel, Rooney Mara, Nicole Kidman, David Wenham	Australia; United Kingdom; United States	Adventure drama
The Lost City of Z	James Gray	Charlie Hunnam, Robert Pattinson, Sienna Miller, Tom Holland	United States	
Moana	Ron Clements and John Musker	Auli'i Cravalho (voice), Dwayne Johnson (voice), Alan Tudyk (voice)	United States	Animated film, family-oriented adventure
The Northlander	Benjamin Ross Hayden	Corey Sevier, Roseanne Supernault, Michelle Thrush	Canada	
The Odyssey	Jérôme Salle	Lambert Wilson, Pierre Niney, Audrey Tautou	France; Belgium	
Passengers	Morten Tyldum	Jennifer Lawrence, Chris Pratt	United States	Space adventure
Pee-wee's Big Holiday	John Lee	Paul Reubens	United States	
Risen	Kevin Reynolds	Joseph Fiennes	United States	
Rock Dog	Ash Brannon	Luke Wilson (voice), Eddie Izzard (voice), J.K. Simmons (voice)	China; United States	
Rogue One	Gareth Edwards	Felicity Jones, Riz Ahmed, Diego Luna	United States	Space adventure
Sausage Party	Greg Tiernan and Conrad Vernon	Seth Rogen (voice), Kristen Wiig (voice), Jonah Hill (voice)	United States	Animated film, adventure comedy
Shin Godzilla	Hideaki Anno and Shinji Higuchi	Hiroki Hasegawa, Satomi Ishihara, Akira Emoto	Japan	
Silence	Martin Scorsese	Andrew Garfield, Adam Driver, Ciarán Hinds, Issei Ogata, Liam Neeson	United States; Taiwan; Italy; United Kingdom; Mexico; Japan	
Star Trek Beyond	Justin Lin	Chris Pine, Zachary Quinto, Idris Elba	United States	Space adventure
Swallows and Amazons	Philippa Lowthorpe	Andrew Scott, Rafe Spall, Kelly Macdonald	United Kingdom	Family-oriented adventure
Swiss Army Man	Dan Kwan and Daniel Scheinert	Paul Dano, Daniel Radcliffe	United States	
Till We Meet Again	Bank Tanjaitrong	John Matton, Linnea Larsdotter, Emrhys Cooper, Vithaya Pansringarm, Astrea Campbell-Cobb	Thailand; United States	
The Train of Salt and Sugar	Licínio Azevedo	Matamba Joaquim, Melanie de Vales Rafael, Thiago Justino	Mozambique	
War Dogs	Todd Phillips	Jonah Hill, Miles Teller	United States	
Warcraft	Duncan Jones	Travis Fimmel, Rob Kazinsky, Paula Patton	United States	Fantasy adventure
Zip & Zap and the Captain's Island	Oskar Santos	Jorge Bosch, Toni Gómez, Elena Anaya	Spain	
Zootopia	Byron Howard, Rich Moore	Jason Bateman, Ginnifer Goodwin, Idris Elba	United States	Animated film

== 2017 ==
Title	Director	Cast	Country	Subgenre/notes
47 Meters Down	Johannes Roberts	Mandy Moore, Claire Holt, Chris J. Johnson	United States	
Back to Q82	Ahmed Siddiqui	El Hussein Abd, Jasem al-Nabhan, Nawaaf al-Shimmeri	United States; Kuwait	
Before Your Time	Lucas James McGraw	Landon Kasten, Roni D. Nybo, Erin Black, Janie Wyatt Wilkinson, Rhys Doud, Ryan Boam, Dan Jacobs and Karlie M. Mathews	United States	Family adventure drama
Berangkat!	Naya Anindita	Tarra Budiman, Ayushita, Ringgo Agus Rahman, Tanta Ginting, Reza Nangin, Martin Anugrah, Saykoji, Annisa Pagih and Babe Cabita	Indonesia	Adventure comedy-drama
Blood, Sand and Gold	Gaelan Connell	Aaron Costa Ganis, Monica West	United States	
Blue World Order	Ché Baker, Dallas Bland	Billy Zane, Bruce Spence, Kendra Appleton, Jack Thompson, Stephen Hunter, Jake Ryan	Australia	
Diamond Cartel	Salamat Mukhammed-Ali	Armand Assante, Peter O'Toole, Michael Madsen	Kazakhstan	
A Dog's Purpose	Lasse Hallström	Josh Gad (voice), Dennis Quaid	United States	
Guardians of the Galaxy Vol. 2	James Gunn	Chris Pratt, Zoe Saldaña, Dave Bautista, Vin Diesel (voice), Bradley Cooper (voice)	United States	Space adventure
Hostiles	Scott Cooper	Christian Bale, Rosamund Pike, Wes Studi	United States	
Jumanji: Welcome to the Jungle	Jake Kasdan	Dwayne Johnson, Jack Black, Kevin Hart, Karen Gillan	United States	Fantasy adventure
Jungle	Greg McLean	Daniel Radcliffe	Australia	
Justice League	Zack Snyder	Ben Affleck, Henry Cavill, Gal Gadot	United States	
King Arthur: Legend of the Sword	Guy Ritchie	Charlie Hunnam, Jude Law, Eric Bana	United Kingdom; United States; Australia	
Kingsman: The Golden Circle	Matthew Vaughn	Colin Firth, Julianne Moore, Taron Egerton, Mark Strong	United States	
Kong: Skull Island	Jordan Vogt-Roberts	John Goodman, Samuel L. Jackson, Tom Hiddleston, Brie Larson	United States	Fantasy adventure
The Lego Ninjago Movie	Charlie Bean, Paul Fisher and Bob Logan	Jackie Chan (voice), Justin Theroux (voice), Dave Franco (voice)	Denmark; United States	Animated film, family-oriented adventure
The Mountain Between Us	Hany Abu-Assad	Idris Elba, Kate Winslet	United States	
The Mummy	Alex Kurtzman	Tom Cruise, Russell Crowe	United States	
Okja	Bong Joon-ho	Ahn Seo-hyun, Tilda Swinton, Jake Gyllenhaal	South Korea; United States	
Phoenix Wilder and the Great Elephant Adventure	Richard Boddington	Elizabeth Hurley, Sam Ashe Arnold	Canada; South Africa	
Pilgrimage	Brendan Muldowney	Tom Holland, Jon Bernthal, Richard Armitage	Belgium; Ireland	Adventure drama
Pirates of the Caribbean: Dead Men Tell No Tales	Joachim Rønning and Espen Sandberg	Johnny Depp, Javier Bardem, Geoffrey Rush	United States	Adventure comedy, sea adventure, pirate film
Providence Island	Roger M. Bobb	Vivica A. Fox, Demetria McKinney, Lisa Wu	United States; Liberia	
Renegades	Steven Quale	Sullivan Stapleton, J. K. Simmons, Charlie Bewley	France	
Savage Dog	Jesse V. Johnson	Scott Adkins	United States	
The Space Between Us	Peter Chelsom	Asa Butterfield, Britt Robertson, Gary Oldman	United States	Science fiction adventure
Star Wars: The Last Jedi	Rian Johnson	Mark Hamill, Carrie Fisher, Adam Driver, Daisy Ridley, John Boyega	United States	Space adventure
Storm: Letters van Vuur	Dennis Bots	Davy Gomez, Juna de Leeuw, Yorick van Wageningen, Angela Schijf	Netherlands	
Tad the Lost Explorer and the Secret of King Midas	Enrique Gato, David Alonso		Spain	Animated film
Valerian and the City of a Thousand Planets	Luc Besson	Dane DeHaan, Cara Delevingne, Clive Owen, Rihanna	France	Space adventure
The Veil	Brent Ryan Green	William Levy, William Moseley, Serinda Swan	United States	Science fiction adventure
Voyage of the Southern Sun	Burt Murphy	Michael Geoffrey Smith	Australia	Documentary
War for the Planet of the Apes	Matt Reeves	Andy Serkis (voice), Woody Harrelson, Steve Zahn	United States	
Wolf Warrior 2	Wu Jing	Wu Jing, Celina Jade, Frank Grillo	China	

== 2018 ==
Title	Director	Cast	Country	Subgenre/notes
2036 Origin Unknown	Hasraf Dulull	Katee Sackhoff, Julie Cox, Steven Cree	United Kingdom	
Adrift	Baltasar Kormákur	Shailene Woodley, Sam Claflin	United States	Sea Adventure
Alpha	Albert Hughes	Kodi Smit-McPhee	United States	
Ant-Man and the Wasp	Peyton Reed	Paul Rudd, Evangeline Lilly, Michael Peña	United States	Science fiction adventure
Aquaman	James Wan	Jason Momoa, Amber Heard, Willem Dafoe	United States	
A.X.L.	Oliver Daly	Becky G, Thomas Jane, Alex Neustaedter	United States	
Black Panther	Ryan Coogler	Chadwick Boseman, Michael B. Jordan, Lupita Nyong'o, Danai Gurira, Martin Freeman, Daniel Kaluuya, Letitia Wright, Winston Duke	United States	Science fiction adventure
Early Man	Nick Park	Maisie Williams (voice), Eddie Redmayne (voice), Tom Hiddleston (voice)	France; United Kingdom	Animated film, adventure comedy
Fantastic Beasts: The Crimes of Grindelwald	David Yates	Eddie Redmayne, Katherine Waterston, Dan Fogler	United Kingdom; United States	Fantasy adventure
First Man	Damien Chazelle	Ryan Gosling, Claire Foy	United States	Adventure drama, space adventure
Galactic Battles	Calvin Romeyn	Mark Meer	Canada	
Genghis Khan	Hasi Chaolu	William Chan, Jelly Lin, Hu Jun	China	Fantasy adventure
Incredibles 2	Brad Bird	Craig T. Nelson (voice), Holly Hunter (voice), Samuel L. Jackson (voice)	United States	Animated film, adventure comedy
The Island	Huang Bo	Huang Bo, Shu Qi, Baoqiang Wang, Zhang Yixing	China	
Isle of Dogs	Wes Anderson	Bryan Cranston (voice), Edward Norton (voice), Bill Murray (voice)	United States; Germany	Stop-motion-animated film
Jim Button and Luke the Engine Driver	Dennis Gansel	Solomon Gordon, Henning Baum	Germany	
Jurassic World: Fallen Kingdom	J. A. Bayona	Chris Pratt, Bryce Dallas Howard	United States	
The King's Musketeers	Giovanni Veronesi	Pierfrancesco Favino, Rocco Papaleo, Valerio Mastandrea, Sergio Rubini	Italy	
The Man Who Killed Don Quixote	Terry Gilliam	Adam Driver, Jonathan Pryce	United Kingdom; Belgium; France; Portugal; Spain	Adventure comedy
Maze Runner: The Death Cure	Wes Ball	Dylan O'Brien, Kaya Scodelario, Thomas Brodie-Sangster, Ki Hong Lee	United States	
The Meg	Jon Turteltaub	Jason Statham, Bingbing Li, Rainn Wilson, Cliff Curtis, Winston Chao	United States; China	Sea adventure
The Mercy	James Marsh	Colin Firth, Rachel Weisz	United Kingdom	Sea adventure
Mortal Engines	Christian Rivers	Hera Hilmar, Robert Sheehan, Hugo Weaving	United States; United Kingdom	
Mowgli: Legend of the Jungle	Andy Serkis	Rohan Chand, Matthew Rhys, Freida Pinto, Christian Bale (voice), Benedict Cumberbatch (voice)	United Kingdom; United States	
Pacific Rim Uprising	Steven S. DeKnight	John Boyega, Scott Eastwood, Jing Tian, Cailee Spaeny	United States	
Peter Rabbit	Will Gluck	Domhnall Gleeson, James Corden, Daisy Ridley	United Kingdom	Adventure comedy
Ready Player One	Steven Spielberg	Tye Sheridan, Olivia Cooke, Ben Mendelsohn, T.J. Miller	United States	Family-oriented adventure
Robin Hood	Otto Bathurst	Taron Egerton, Jamie Foxx, Ben Mendelsohn	United States	
Samson	Bruce Macdonald	Jackson Rathbone, Billy Zane, Taylor James, Rutger Hauer	United States	
The Shape of Water	Guillermo del Toro	Cyndy Day, David Hewlitt, Doug Jones, John Kapelos, Lauren Lee Smith, Michael Shannon, Nick Searcy	United States	
Solo: A Star Wars Story	Ron Howard	Alden Ehrenreich, Woody Harrelson, Emilia Clarke, Donald Glover, Joonas Suotamo	United States	Space adventure
A Son of Man	Jamaicanoproblem, Pablo Agüero	Luis Felipe Fernández-Salvador y Bolona	Ecuador	
Tomb Raider	Roar Uthaug	Alicia Vikander	United Kingdom; United States	
White Fang	Alexandre Espigares		France	Animated film
Woman at War	Benedict Erlingsson	Halldóra Geirharðsdóttir	Iceland; France; Ukraine	
A Wrinkle in Time	Ava DuVernay	Storm Reid, Oprah Winfrey, Reese Witherspoon, Zach Galifianakis	United States	Family-oriented adventure

== 2019 ==
Title	Director	Cast	Country	Subgenre/notes
47 Meters Down: Uncaged	Johannes Roberts	Sophie Nélisse, Corinne Foxx, Brianne Tju, Sistine Stallone	United States	Sea adventure
The Aeronauts	Tom Harper	Felicity Jones, Eddie Redmayne	United Kingdom; United States	Balloon adventure
Aladdin	Guy Ritchie	Mena Massoud, Will Smith, Naomi Scott, Marwan Kenzari	United States	
Avengers: Endgame	Anthony Russo, Joe Russo	Robert Downey Jr., Brie Larson, Scarlett Johansson, Chris Evans, Chris Hemsworth	United States	
Dora and the Lost City of Gold	James Bobin	Isabela Moner, Eugenio Derbez, Michael Peña, Eva Longoria	United States	Family-oriented adventure
How to Train Your Dragon: The Hidden World	Dean DeBlois		United States	Animated film
Jumanji: The Next Level	Jake Kasdan	Dwayne Johnson, Jack Black, Kevin Hart, Karen Gillan	United States	
The Kid Who Would Be King	Joe Cornish	Louis Ashbourne Serkis, Rebecca Ferguson	United Kingdom; United States	Family-oriented adventure, fantasy adventure
The Peanut Butter Falcon	Tyler Nilsen, Michael Schwartz	Shia LaBeouf, Dakota Johnson, Bruce Dern, John Hawkes, Thomas Haden Church	United States	
Rocko's Modern Life: Static Cling	Joe Murray, Cosmo Segurson	Carlos Alazraqui (voice), Tom Kenny (voice), Charlie Adler (voice), Mr. Lawrence (voice)	United States	
Star Wars: The Rise of Skywalker	J. J. Abrams	Adam Driver, Daisy Ridley, John Boyega, Oscar Isaac	United States	Space adventure
Triple Frontier	J. C. Chandor	Ben Affleck, Oscar Isaac, Charlie Hunnam, Garrett Hedlund, Pedro Pascal	United States	
