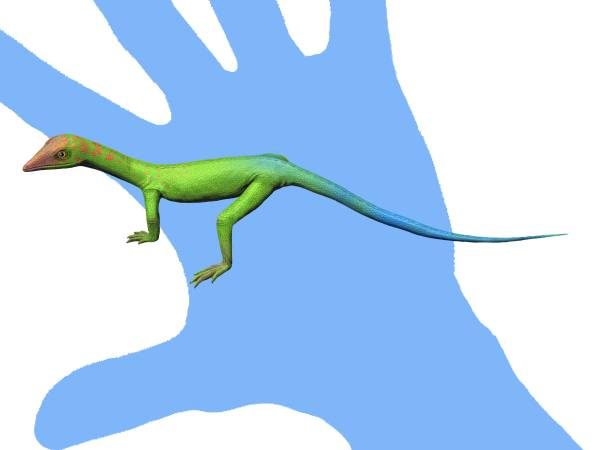
- Life reconstruction of Cosesaurus aviceps

Scientific classification
- Kingdom: Animalia
- Phylum: Chordata
- Class: Reptilia
- Family: †Tanystropheidae
- Genus: †Cosesaurus; Ellenberger & de Villalta 1974
- Species: †C. aviceps

Binomial name
- †Cosesaurus aviceps Ellenberger & de Villalta 1974

= Cosesaurus =

Cosesaurus Temporal range: Middle Triassic, Ladinian

Extinct genus of reptiles

Cosesaurus is a genus of archosauromorph reptiles likely belonging to the family Tanystropheidae. It is known from fossil imprints of a single small skeleton, MGB V1, which was found in Muschelkalk outcrops near the municipalities of Mont-ral and Alcover in Spain. These outcrops are dated to the Ladinian age of the middle Triassic about 242 to 237 million years ago. The specimen is stored at the Museu Martorell (a.k.a. the Museu Geologia de Barcelona), which is now part of the Museu de Ciències Naturals de Barcelona. The poor preservation and likely juvenile nature of the specimen has led to the anatomy of Cosesaurus being misidentified by several different sources. For example, Paul Ellenberger claimed that it was an ancestor to birds in the 1970s, while David Peters claimed that it was a pterosaur ancestor in 2000. Both of these claims contrast with mainstream scientific theories on the origins of either group, and other paleontologists who study the specimen are unable to find the features which Ellenberger or Peters reported to be present. The Ellenberger and Peters hypotheses are thus considered fringe theories with questionable scientific soundness due to their low reproducibility. Mainstream hypotheses for the relations of Cosesaurus generally agree that it is a "protorosaur", specifically a tanystropheid closely related to long-necked reptiles such as Macrocnemus, Tanytrachelos, Tanystropheus, or Langobardisaurus.

== History ==
Due to its poor preservation in grainy sedimentary rock, the fossil has been misinterpreted by many paleontologists in the past. The first describer of the specimen, Paul Ellenberger, erroneously observed bird-like features which could not be confirmed by later studies. He published several analyses of the specimen, in 1974, 1977, and 1993. He hypothesized that it was an ancestor to birds, but this hypothesis was soon abandoned by other paleontologists.

For example, in 1979 Paul Olson briefly discussed the specimen during his description of the small tanystropheid Tanytrachelos. He found difficulty diagnosing the specimen using Ellenberger's photographs, but he did note that it shared many similarities with tanystropheids such as Tanytrachelos and Tanystropheus rather than birds.

Ellenberger's hypothesis fell out of favor in the late 20th century due to the growing evidence for the origin of birds among coelurosaurian dinosaurs. During this time, most comprehensive study of Cosesaurus since Ellenberger's was performed by José Luis Sanz & Nieves López-Martínez in 1984. They found that barely any of the features Ellenberger used to link Cosesaurus to birds were valid. They also studied its proportions and concluded that it was likely a juvenile specimen. Based on this hypothesis, they constructed a skeletal diagram showing what an adult Cosesaurus may look like, considering how the proportions of reptiles change during development. Sanz and López-Martínez found that the closest relative of Cosesaurus was probably a "prolacertid" such as Macrocnemus.

In 2000, a variant of Ellenberger's hypothesis was published by researcher Dave Peters. Peters claimed to have found features in the specimen which resemble those which Ellenberger claimed connected Cosesaurus to birds. However, Peters instead purported that these putative features indicated that Cosesaurus was an ancestor to pterosaurs rather than birds. However, paleontologists who examined the specimen could not find evidence to support Peters' claims, and noted that his link between Cosesaurus and pterosaurs relied on a poorly constructed phylogenetic analysis. The consensus view, as explained and advocated by studies such as Nesbitt (2011) and Ezcurra (2016), is that pterosaurs were not closely related to "protorosaurs" such as Cosesaurus, and instead are advanced archosaurs closely related to dinosaurs. In 2009, Peters published a follow-up to his 2000 study which used a digital tracing algorithm to support his claims for features such as prepubic bones and frill-like skin flaps. However, this method has also been heavily criticized due to its reliance on photographs in the literature rather than personal observation or CT scan evidence.

A doctorate thesis published in 2016 by Franco Saller, although mostly focusing on the musculoskeletal system of Macrocnemus bassanii, also provided a redescription of Cosesaurus. This thesis, written in Italian, debunked certain features of the specimen purported by Ellenberger or Peters, such as the presence of a sternum or more than two vertebrae in the sacrum. It also provided additional implications for the anatomy and biology of members of the genus.

== Description ==
The specimen has an estimated length of 14 centimeters (5.5 inches), although the impressions of the tip of the tail are faint, so this length may have been slightly longer. Due to the poor preservation of the specimen, definitive features are difficult to find. Ellenberger reported webbed feet and feather impressions imprinted among the bone impressions, and Peters (2000) claimed that Ellenberger instead observed skin remnants such as a patagium or actin fibers. However, both of these claims of soft-tissue are dubious, as other paleontologists who have analyzed the specimen explain that the texture of the rock surface near the bones cannot be differentiated from the rest of the rock slab.

=== Skull ===
The snout is moderate in length, not as elongated as the state in early theropod dinosaurs like Coelophysis, but not as short as in early amniotes. Few details of the skull can be identified with absolute confidence. The skull and particularly the eyes were proportionally quite large, although these are likely juvenile features. The dome-like skull roof was thinnest above the eyes before broadening towards the back of the head. Numerous small, pointed teeth were present in the mouth, including an estimated six or seven in the long and pointed premaxilla. A few teeth at the back of the mouth were large, triangular, and blade-like compared to the thinner teeth in the rest of the jaw. Although the skull impression is crushed, a small depression in front of the eye is conspicuous. Ellenberger (1977) claimed that this depression was perforated through the snout and represented an antorbital fenestra, while Peters (2000) argued that it represented a series of fenestrae. Close examination by Saller (2016), however, showed that the depression's depth could not be determined, nor which bones surrounded it. The jaw joint possesses some features which indicate that Cosesaurus was a saurian, similar to modern reptiles such as lizards, dinosaurs, and crocodilians, instead of more primitive amniote groups such as araeoscelidians and weigeltisaurids. These features include the possession of a retroarticular process of the mandible and a quadrate bone which is notched from behind and visible from outside the skull. However, the flexibility of the quadrate (and therefore the potential for cranial kinesis) is unclear.

=== Vertebrae ===
The neck is moderately long, about the same length of the skull and more than half the length of the body. It is formed by 7 or 8 elongated vertebrae as in a variety of other archosauromorphs, such as early dinosaurs, Prolacerta, and Macrocnemus. Like other "protorosaurs", but unlike birds and pterosaurs, the cervicals (neck vertebrae) attached to very long and thin cervical ribs. Although the neck is short compared to other tanystropheids, Sanz & López-Martínez (1984) and Saller (2016) note that the necks of tanystropheids tend to become proportionally longer as they age. Therefore, the short neck of Cosesaurus (by tanystropheid standards) is likely a juvenile feature.

The vertebrae of the body were shorter than the cervicals, about as long as they were tall. The dorsal ribs were short and thin. Ellenberger (1977) supposedly found that Cosesaurus possessed three fused sacral (hip) vertebrae, while Peters (2000) claimed that four were present. However, both of these claims were debunked by Saller (2016). Although he did note that there was room for three sacral vertebrae in the hip region of Cosesaurus, he also showed that only two pairs of sacral ribs were present, and that the quality of preservation was too poor to make out sutures within the sacrum to support the claims of Ellenberger or Peters. Therefore, Cosesaurus likely possessed only two sacral vertebrae, similar to most reptiles.

The tail is long, composed of 40 or more elongated vertebrae. The first few possessed thin ribs which gradually decreased in length. Ellenberger claimed that the vertebrae were fused into a rod-like pygostyle and lacked haemal spines (chevrons), but both of these were later debunked by Sanz & López-Martínez (1984) and Saller (2016).

=== Pectoral girdle and forelimbs ===
The pectoral (shoulder) girdle is one of the most commonly misidentified areas of the Cosesaurus specimen. Ellenberger (1977) claimed that a bird-like sternum (breastplate) and furcula (wishbone) were present, but these features were not found by Sanz & López-Martínez (1984). Saller (2016) elaborated on Ellenberger's misidentification. He explained that the "furcula" was simply a pair of unfused clavicles as in other reptiles, and that the "sternum" was simply the rounded lower portion of the coracoid bones. Peters (2000) also identified Ellenberger's "sternum" as the coracoids, but he was incorrect in assuming that a sternum was present regardless, as Saller could not find any evidence for the bone's existence in Cosesaurus. Olson (1979) drew connections to the shoulder girdle of tanystropheids.

The forelimbs are much smaller than the hindlimbs, but still decently sized by the standards of most reptiles. The humerus (upper arm bone) is long and straight, with flat joint surfaces and a middle which is slightly thinner than the tips of the bone. The radius and ulna (bones of the lower arm) are similar in build. The hand is very long, with five thin fingers. The third finger is the longest, and its length when combined with the hand exceeds the length of the lower arm.

=== Pelvic girdle and hindlimbs ===
The hip region and pelvic girdle are poorly preserved. The ilium, perhaps the only visible portion of the pelvis, is unusually elongated in Cosesaurus. Olson (1979) noted that there may have been large, curved bones at the base of the tail similar to the "heterotopic" bones of Tanytrachelos and Tanystropheus. These bones may have been related to reproductive processes. However, Olson explained that his observations of Cosesaurus were facilitated with Ellenberger's original grainy photographs, and that new observations made using such methods may be dubious. Although Peters identified supposed pterosaur-like "prepubic bones" in Cosesaurus, Darren Naish could find no clear evidence of such features using Peters' photographs, and Saller (2016) made no mention of Peters' claims during his study of the specimen.

The hind limbs were longer than both the forelimbs and the trunk as a whole, features which may have had repercussions on the biology of the animal. The leg bones were long and straight, similar in build to the arm bones. The proximal portion of the femur (thigh bone) was wider than the distal portion, similar to the case in tanystropheids. Four out of the five metatarsals (main foot bones) were long, straight, and closely bundled together. They connected to long toes tipped with pointed claws, with the fourth toe being the longest. The fifth (outermost) metatarsal is much shorter and broader, acquiring a "hooked" shape. According to Olson (1979), the fifth toe of the foot may have had an elongated metatarsal-like first phalanx (toe bone) to counteract the shrunken fifth metatarsal. This feature is unique to most tanystropheids, with the exception of Macrocnemus. Olson's suspicions were later confirmed by Saller (2016)'s study of the specimen.

== Classification ==
In 1977, Ellenberger proposed that Cosesaurus was an ancestor of modern birds. That publication followed the description of the bird-like theropod, Deinonychus, but it appeared long before the theropod ancestry of birds had been widely accepted. In this publication, Ellenberger interpreted the following traits in the fossil: a strap-like scapula, a furcula (wishbone), a keeled sternum, beak-like jaws, a retroverted pubis and tail feathers. However, every other scientific study including Cosesaurus since Ellenberger (1977) has found that many of these traits were incorrectly identified and that it was unlikely to be related to birds.

Studies since Ellenberger (1977) have interpreted Cosesaurus as a "prolacertiform" or "protorosaur". These terms refer to a particular group of reptiles with elongated necks, such as Prolacerta, Macrocnemus, and Tanystropheus. This group has undergone much revision, both internally (which taxa belong to it) and externally (where it belongs on the reptile family tree). Prior to the late 20th century, "prolacertiforms" were shuffled around Reptilia, with some sources positing them as the ancestors to lizards. These sources include the redescribers of Cosesaurus, Sanz & López-Martínez (1984). However, by the late 1980s a consensus was reached which positioned "prolacertiforms" as archosauromorphs, meaning that they were closer to archosaurs such as crocodilians and dinosaurs rather than lepidosaurs such as lizards or snakes.

However, the term "Prolacertiformes" fell apart in 1998, when David Dilkes determined that Prolacerta was not actually a close relative of other "prolacertiformes", instead being a more crown-ward archosauromorph. This revelation has caused the term "Prolacertiformes" to be abandoned by archosauromorph specialists, replaced with "Protorosauria", which encompasses many of the reptiles once considered close to Prolacerta. Cosesaurus was retained among the protorosaurians, although its position within the group is usually not tested by phylogenetic analyses due to its fragmentary nature. Olson (1979) suggested that it lay among the tanystropheids, a group of specialized possibly semi-aquatic protorosaurs including Tanytrachelos and Tanystropheus. This interpretation was also supported by Ezcurra et al. in 2017. Sanz & López-Martínez (1984) identified it as a "prolacertid" such as Macrocnemus and Prolacerta, although this term has mainly been abandoned for similar reasons as "Prolacertiformes". Macrocnemus is now classified as a tanystropheid as well. Tanystropheids are occasionally found to be crown-ward of other "protorosaurs", although not the same extent as Prolacerta.

Although Sanz & López-Martínez (1984) argued that the closest relative of Cosesaurus was Macrocnemus based on their proportional analysis, Olson (1979) and Saller (2016) each placed it among more advanced members of Tanystropheidae. They argued that the metatarsal-like first phalanx of the fifth toe invalidated a connection to Macrocnemus specifically.

Saller (2016)'s thesis used two different phylogenetic analyses from previous authors to study the relations of "protorosaurs". The first of these analyses was from Dilkes (1998), the study which famously dissolved the monophyly of "Prolacertiformes". However, when the analysis was modified to include more tanystropheids and run by Saller, the results were fairly inconclusive. Saller's most parsimonious trees (MPTs) could not agree on the structure of tanystropheids more advanced than Macrocnemus. MPTs are family trees which include the smallest number of "steps" (evolutionary transitions, where traits are gained and lost). Under the guidelines of Occam's razor, MPTs are the most accurate depictions of evolutionary relationships. However, Saller's six MPTs disagreed on the structure of Tanystropheidae. The only result found by all six MPTs was that Macrocnemus was the most basal member of the family.

In an effort to obtain more conclusive results, Saller added the unusual drepanosaur Megalancosaurus to the analysis in the hopes that it would clarify relations. Although certain parts of the analysis were made more conclusive (for example, the structure of Archosauromorpha was close to that found by Ezcurra [2016]), the internal structure of Protorosauria and Tanystropheidae was no more conclusive than when the analysis was performed without Megalancosaurus.

This problem spurred Saller to use a second phylogenetic analysis. This analysis, originally created by Pritchard et al. (2015), focused on tanystropheids specifically. This analysis found three MPTs. Although the structure of Archosauromorpha was once again inconclusive, all three MPTs were in agreement to the structure of Tanystropheidae. One of the most interesting results was that Cosesaurus was placed as the sister taxon to Langobardisaurus, an unusual tanystropheid which may have been bipedal and herbivorous. This connection was informed by three synapomorphies (derived distinguishing traits): cervical and dorsal vertebrae with flat anterior joints, dorsals with low neural spines, and poorly expanded distal condyles of the femur.

Below is the result of Saller (2016)'s usage of the Pritchard et al. (2015) analysis. The following cladogram is a strict consensus tree, meaning that it is a combination of the three MPTs which reduces contested areas into a polytomy in order to not disagree with any particular MPT:

- Archosauromorpha
  - Protorosaurus
  - - Rhynchosauria
      - Mesosuchus
      - - Teyumbaita
        - Rhynchosaurus
    - Tanystropheidae
      - Macrocnemus
      - - - Langobardisaurus
          - Cosesaurus
        - - Tanytrachelos
          - - Amotosaurus
            - Tanystropheus
    - - Prolacerta
      - Trilophosauridae
        - Teraterpeton
        - Trilophosaurus
      - Archosauriformes
        - Batrachotomus
        - Euparkeria
        - Erythrosuchus
        - Proterosuchus

== Paleobiology ==
=== Locomotion ===
The hind legs of the Cosesaurus specimen are longer than the forelimbs, indicating that it was possibly, but not certainly, bipedal. Sanz & López-Martínez (1984) used a proportional tool known as the "Index of Galton" to investigate the possibility. Originated by Peter Galton in a 1976 study on "prosauropods" (basal sauropodomorphs), this index compares the length of the entire hind limb to that of the animal's body (not including the neck or tail). The Cosesaurus specimen was found to have a ratio of 1.21, which was larger than solely quadrupedal eolacertilians (primitive squamate relatives) but smaller than solely bipedal early theropods like Coelophysis. This could indicate some degree of bipedal movement, but the specimen has also been hypothesized to be a juvenile. In modern crocodiles, the Galton index shrinks from 1.06 to .79 between hatchlings and adults. If the ratio shrinks to the same extent in Cosesaurus individuals, they likely passed out of the range allowing for bipedalism by the time they reach adulthood.
