= List of animated feature films of 2011 =

This is a list of animated feature films first released in 2011.

== List ==
Animated feature films first released in 2011
| Title | Country | Director | Production company | Animation technique | Notes | Type | Release date | Duration |
|---|---|---|---|---|---|---|---|---|
| 3 to the rescue | Dominican Republic | Jorge Morillo; Luis Morillo | Raycast Animation Studio; Antena Latina Films | Computer | | | January 6, 2011 | 80 minutes |
| The Adventures of Tintin: The Secret of the Unicorn | United States | Steven Spielberg | Amblin Entertainment / The Kennedy/Marshall Company / Nickelodeon Movies / WingNut Films / Paramount Pictures | Computer | | Theatrical | October 23, 2011 (Belgium); October 25, 2011 (United Kingdom); October 26, 2011 (New Zealand); December 21, 2011 (United States) | 107 minutes |
| Alvin and the Chipmunks: Chipwrecked | United States | Mike Mitchell | 20th Century Fox | Computer / Live action | Theatrical | | December 16, 2011 | 87 minutes |
| A Fairly Odd Movie: Grow Up, Timmy Turner! | United States; Canada | Savage Steve Holland | Billionfold Inc. Frederator Studios; Pacific Bay Entertainment; Nickelodeon Productions | Computer / Live action | | | July 9, 2011 | 48 minutes |
| Alice in the Country of Hearts: Wonderful Wonder World ハートの国のアリス: Wonderful Wonder World (Hāto no Kuni no Arisu: Wonderful Wonder World) | Japan | Hideaki Ōba | Asahi Production | Traditional | | | July 30, 2011 | 85 minutes |
| All-Star Superman | United States | Sam Liu | Warner Bros. Animation, DC Entertainment | Traditional | | Direct-to-video | February 22, 2011 | 78 minutes |
| Alois Nebel | Czech Republic | Tomáš Luňák | Negativ | Traditional | | | September 4, 2011 (Venice Film Festival); September 29, 2011 | 84 minutes |
| Go! Anpanman: Rescue! Kokorin and the Star of Miracles ja:それいけ!アンパンマン すくえ! ココリンと奇跡の星 | Japan | Hiroyuki Yano | Anpanman Production Committee, TMS Entertainment | Traditional | | | July 2, 2011 | 45 minutes |
| Arthur Christmas | United Kingdom; United States | Sarah Smith | Aardman Animations / Sony Pictures Animation / Columbia Pictures | Computer | | Theatrical | November 11, 2011 (United Kingdom); November 23, 2011 (United States) | 97 minutes |
| Barbie: A Fairy Secret | United States | William Lau, Terry Klassen | Rainmaker Entertainment / Universal Pictures / Kidtoon Films | Computer | | Direct-to-video | March 15, 2011 (DVD release) | 75 minutes |
| Barbie: Princess Charm School | United States | Zeke Norton | Rainmaker Entertainment / Universal Pictures / Kidtoon Films | Computer | | Direct-to-video | September 13, 2011 | 81 minutes |
| Barbie: A Perfect Christmas | United States | Mark Baldo | Rainmaker Entertainment / Universal Pictures / Kidtoon Films | Computer | | Direct-to-video | November 8, 2011 | 74 minutes |
| Batman: Year One | United States | Lauren Montgomery, Sam Liu | Warner Bros. Animation, DC Entertainment | Traditional | | Direct-to-video | October 18, 2011 | 64 minutes |
| Berry and Dolly - Gingerbread hu:Bogyó és Babóca 2. - 13 új mese | Hungary | Antonin Krizanics; Géza M. Tóth | Kedd Animation Studio | Traditional | | | June 2, 2011 | 65 minutes |
| Brasil Animado | Brazil | Mariana Caltabiano | Mariana Caltabiano Criações; TeleImage; Globo Filmes; 3D Casablanca | Flash animation Live-action | | | January 21, 2011 | 75 minutes |
| Broken Blade 5: Death's Horizon 死線ノ涯 [しせんのはて] (Shisen no Hate) | Japan | Tetsuro Amino, Nobuyoshi Habara | Production I.G, Xebec | Traditional | | | January 22, 2011 | 47 minutes |
| Broken Blade 6: Bastions of Sorrow 慟哭ノ砦 [どうこくのとりで] (Doukoku no Toride) | Japan | Tetsuro Amino, Nobuyoshi Habara | Production I.G, Xebec | Traditional | | | March 26, 2011 | 52 minutes |
| Buddha: The Great Departure 手塚治虫のブッダ-赤い砂漠よ!美しく- (Tezuka Osamu no Buddha -Akai Sabaku yo! Utsukushiku-) | Japan | Kozo Morishita | Toei Animation / Warner Bros. | Traditional | | | May 28, 2011 | 110 minutes |
| Cars 2 | United States | John Lasseter, Brad Lewis | Walt Disney Pictures / Pixar | Computer | | Theatrical | June 18, 2011 (Hollywood); June 24, 2011 (United States) | 106 minutes |
| Children Who Chase Lost Voices from Deep Below 星を追う子ども (Hoshi o Ou Kodomo) | Japan | Makoto Shinkai | CoMix Wave Inc. | Traditional | | | May 7, 2011 | 116 minutes |
| Chop Kick Panda | United States | Darrell Van Citters | Renegade Animation | Flash animation | | | May 10, 2011 | 41 minutes |
| Crayon Shin-chan: The Storm Called: Operation Golden Spy クレヨンしんちゃん 嵐を呼ぶ黄金のスパイ大作戦 (Kureyon Shinchan Arashi o Yobu Ōgon no Supai Daisakusen) | Japan | Sôichi Masui | Shin-Ei Animation | Traditional | | | April 16, 2011 | 107 minutes |
| Crulic: The Path to Beyond; Crulic – Drumul spre dincolo | Romania; Poland | Anca Damian | Aparte Film | Mixed | | | August 11, 2011 (Locarno Film Festival); October 21, 2011 (Romania); December 1, 2011 (Poland) | 73 minutes |
| Daddy, I'm a Zombie; Papá, soy una zombi | Spain | Ricardo Ramón, Joan Espinach | Abra Producciones | Computer | | | November 25, 2011 (Gijón International Film Festival) | 80 minutes |
| Dead Space: Aftermath | United States | Mike Disa | Starz Media / Film Roman / Pumpkin Studio / Electronic Arts | Traditional; Computer | | Direct-to-video | January 25, 2011 | 90 minutes |
| Detective Conan: Quarter of Silence | Japan | Yasuichiro Yamamoto | TMS Entertainment | Traditional | | | April 16, 2011 | 109 minutes |
| Diary of a Wimpy Kid: Rodrick Rules | United States | David Bowers | 20th Century Fox | Traditional / Live action | | Theatrical | March 25, 2011 | 100 minutes |
| Doraemon: Nobita and the New Steel Troops—Winged Angels 映画ドラえもん 新・のび太と鉄人兵団 〜はばたけ 天使たち〜 (Eiga Doraemon Shin Nobita to Tetsujin Heidan ~Habatake Tenshi Tachi~) | Japan | Yukiyo Teramoto | Shin-Ei Animation | Traditional | | | March 5, 2011 | 108 minutes |
| The Elf Who Stole Christmas; Olentzero y El Iratxo | Spain | Gorka Vázquez | Baleuko S.L. Talope | Computer | | | December 2, 2011 | 69 minutes |
| Emilie Jolie fr:Emile Jolie | Belgium; France | Philippe Chatel, Francis Nielsen | Télé Images Productions, 2d3D Animations | Traditional | | | August 28, 2011 (Festival du Film Francophone d'Angoulême); October 13, 2011 (La Roche-sur-Yon International Film Festival); October 16, 2011 (Valenciennes Film Festival); October 19, 2011 (France) | 72 minutes |
| Eva from Argentina; Eva de la Argentina | Argentina | María Seoane | Illusion Studios | Flash animation | | | October 20, 2011 (Buenos Aires) | 75 minutes |
| Fimfarum – The Third Time Lucky | Czech Republic | Vlasta Pospíšilová, Kristina Dufková, David Súkup | MAUR Film | Stop motion | | | February 10, 2011 | 75 minutes |
| Friends: Naki on Monster Island friends もののけ島のナキ (Friends: Mononoke Shima no Naki) | Japan | Takashi Yamazaki; Ryūichi Yagi | Toho | Computer | | | December 17, 2011 | 87 minutes |
| From up on Poppy Hill コクリコ坂から (Kokuriko-zaka Kara) | Japan | Gorō Miyazaki | Studio Ghibli | Traditional | | | July 16, 2011 | 92 minutes |
| Fullmetal Alchemist: The Sacred Star of Milos (鋼の錬金術師 嘆きの丘(ミロス)の聖なる星) (Hagane no Renkinjutsushi: Mirosu no Sei-naru Hoshi) | Japan | Kazuya Murata | BONES/ Aniplex / Shochiku | Traditional | | | May 2, 2011 (Tokyo); July 2, 2011 (Japan) | 111 minutes |
| George the Hedgehog; Jeż Jerzy | Poland | Wojciech Wawszczyk; Jakub Tarkowski; Tomasz Lew Leśniak | Paisa Films Produkcja | Flash animation | | | March 11, 2011 | 90 minutes |
| Gnomeo & Juliet | United States; United Kingdom | Kelly Asbury | Rocket Pictures | Computer | | Theatrical | January 23, 2011 (El Capitan Theatre); February 11, 2011 (United States and United Kingdom) | 84 minutes |
| The Great Bear; Den kæmpestore bjørn | Denmark | Esben Toft Jacobsen | Copenhagen Bombay / Film i Väst | Computer | | | February 10, 2011 | 75 minutes |
| Green Lantern: Emerald Knights | United States | Christopher Berkeley, Lauren Montgomery, Jay Oliva | Warner Bros. Animation / DC Entertainment | Traditional | | Direct-to-video | June 7, 2011 | 84 minutes |
| The Green Wave | Germany | Ali Samadi Ahadi | Arte | Traditional | | | June 22, 2010 (TV premiere); October 5, 2010 (Hamburg Film Festival); February 24, 2011 (Germany) | 80 minutes |
| Happy Feet Two | Australia; United States | George Miller | Dr. D Studios / Warner Bros. | Computer | | Theatrical | November 13, 2011 (Grauman's Chinese Theatre); November 18, 2011 (United States); December 26, 2011 (Australia) | 100 minutes |
| Hayate the Combat Butler! Heaven Is a Place on Earth 劇場版 ハヤテのごとく! HEAVEN IS A PLACE ON EARTH (Hayate no Gotoku! HEAVEN IS A PLACE ON EARTH) | Japan | Hideto Komori | Manglobe | Traditional | | | August 27, 2011 | 70 minutes |
| Heaven's Lost Property the Movie: The Angeloid of Clockwork 劇場版 そらのおとしもの 時計じかけの哀女神(エンジェロイド) (Gekijōban Sora no Otoshimono: Tokei-jikake no Enjeroido) | Japan | Hisashi Saitō, Tetsuya Yanagisawa | AIC A.S.T.A | Traditional | | | June 25, 2011 | 97 minutes |
| Hoodwinked Too! Hood vs. Evil | United States | Mike Disa | Kanbar Entertainment / The Weinstein Company | Computer | | | April 23, 2011 (Tribeca Film Festival); April 29, 2011 | 87 minutes |
| Hop | United States | Tim Hill | Universal Pictures / Illumination Entertainment | Computer / Live-action | | Theatrical | March 27, 2011 (Universal Sudios Hollywood); April 1, 2011 (United States) | 95 minutes |
| Ivan Tsarevich and the Grey Wolf; Иван Царевич и Серый Волк (Ivan Tsarevich i Seryy Volk) | Russia | Vladimir Toropchin | Melnitsa Animation Studio | Traditional | | | December 29, 2011 | 80 minutes |
| Jensen & Jensen | Denmark | Craig Frank | Miso Film | Computer | | | August 10, 2011 | 90 minutes |
| Jock the Hero Dog aka Jock of the Bushveld | South Africa | Duncan MacNeillie | Jock Animation | Computer | | | July 29, 2011 | 89 minutes |
| Johnny Bravo Goes to Bollywood | United States | Van Partible | Cartoon Network Studios | Traditional | | | November 4, 2011 | 66 minutes |
| The Jungle Bunch: Back to the Ice Floe; Les As de la Jungle – Operation banquise | France | David Alaux; Éric Tosti | TAT Production | Computer | | | December 31, 2011 | 58 minutes |
| Kikoriki. Team Invincible; Смешарики. Начало (Smeshariki. Nachalo) | Russia | Denis Chernov | Petersburg Animation Studio, Riki Group, Bazelevs | Computer | | | December 22, 2011 | 88 minutes |
| The King of Pigs 돼지의 왕 (Dae gi eui wang) | South Korea | Yeon Sang-ho | Studio Dadashow, KT&G Sangsangmadang, | Traditional | | | October 8, 2011 (Busan International Film Festival) | 97 minutes |
| K-On! けいおん! (Keion!) | Japan | Naoko Yamada | Kyoto Animation | Traditional | | | December 3, 2011 | 110 minutes |
| Kuiba | China | | Vasoon Animation | Traditional | | | July 8, 2011 | 90 minutes |
| Kung Fu Panda 2 | United States | Jennifer Yuh Nelson | DreamWorks Animation / Paramount Pictures | Computer | | Theatrical | May 22, 2011 (Hollywood premiere); May 26, 2011 (United States) | 90 minutes |
| La Leyenda de La Llorona | Mexico | Alberto Rodriguez | Videocine / Anima Studios | Flash animation | | | October 21, 2011 | 75 minutes |
| Laura's Star and the Dream Monsters; Lauras Stern und die Traummonster | Germany | Ute von Münchow-Pohl, Thilo Rothkirch | Rothkirch/Cartoon-Film Produktion | Computer / Traditional | | | October 13, 2011 | 65 minutes |
| Leafie, A Hen into the Wild 마당을 나온 암탉 (Madangeul Naon Amtak) | South Korea | Seong-yun Oh | MK Pictures | Computer | | | July 28, 2011 | 93 minutes |
| Legend of the Millennium Dragon 鬼神伝 (Onigamiden) | Japan | Hirotsugu Kawasaki | Studio Pierrot | Traditional | | | April 29, 2011 | 98 minutes |
| Legend of a Rabbit 兔侠传奇 (Tu Xia Chuan Qi) | China | Sun Li Jun | Beijing Film Academy, Tianjin Film Studio | Computer | | | July 11, 2011 | 89 minutes |
| Legend of the Moles: The Frozen Horror | China; Spain | Liu Kexin | | Traditional | | | August 11, 2011 | 95 minutes |
| Legends of Valhalla: Thor; Hetjur Valhallar – Þór | Iceland; Germany; Ireland | Óskar Jónasson, Toby Genkel, Gunnar Karlsson | CAOZ, Ulysses Filmproduktion, Magma Films | Computer | | | October 14, 2011 | 79 minutes |
| A Letter to Momo ももへの手紙 (Momo e no Tegami) | Japan | Hiroyuki Okiura | Production I.G | Traditional | | | September 10, 2011 (TIFF); April 21, 2012 (Japan) | 120 minutes |
| The Light of a Firefly Forest 蛍火の杜へ (Hotarubi no Mori e) | Japan | Takahiro Omori | Brain's Base | Traditional | | | September 17, 2011 | 44 minutes |
| The Lion of Judah | United States | Deryck Broom, Roger Hawkins | Animated Family Films / Rocky Mountain Pictures | Computer | | | June 3, 2011 | 87 minutes |
| Little Big Panda | China; France; Germany; Luxembourg; Spain | Greg Manwaring | China Film Group Corp., ORB Filmproduktion GmbH | Traditional | | | February 3, 2011 | 86 minutes |
| The Little Engine That Could | United States | Elliot M. Bour | Crest Animation Productions / Universal Animation Studios | Computer | | Direct-to-video | March 22, 2011 | 82 minutes |
| The Littlest Angel | United States | Dave Kim | Anchor Bay, Portsmouth Pictures, Cinepix Animation | Computer | | | November 15, 2011 | 84 minutes |
| Lotte and the Moonstone Secret; Lotte ja kuukivi saladus | Estonia; Latvia | Heiki Ernits, Janno Põldma | | Traditional | | | August 25, 2011 | 76 minutes |
| Macross Frontier The Movie: The Wings of Farewell 劇場版 マクロスF 恋離飛翼〜サヨナラノツバサ〜 (Gekijôban Macross F: Sayonara no tsubasa) | Japan | Shoji Kawamori | Satelight | Traditional | | | February 26, 2011 | 115 minutes |
| The Magic Crystal fi:Maaginen kristalli | Finland | Antti Haikala | Cartoon One, Connectoon, Epidem, Nelonen, uFilm | Computer | | | November 18, 2011 | 80 minutes |
| Magic Tree House マジック・ツリーハウス | Japan | Hiroshi Nishikiori | Ajia-do Animation Works | Traditional | | | October 23, 2011 (Tokyo Film Festival); January 7, 2012 (Japan) | 105 minutes |
| Mardock Scramble: The Second Combustion マルドゥック・スクランブル 燃焼 (Marudukku Sukuranburu: Nenshō) | Japan | Susumu Kudo | GoHands | Traditional | | | September 3, 2011 | 64 minutes |
| Mars Needs Moms | United States | Simon Wells | Walt Disney Pictures / ImageMovers Digital | Computer | | Theatrical | March 6, 2011 (El Capitan Theatre); March 11, 2011 (United States) | 88 minutes |
| Marx Reloaded | Germany | Jason Barker | Films Noirs / Arte | Traditional | | | April 11, 2011 (Germany, France); February 10, 2012 (United Kingdom); September 1, 2012 (United States) | 52 minutes |
| A Monster in Paris; Un monstre a Paris | France | Bibo Bergeron | Bibo Films / EuropaCorp Distribution | Computer | | | October 21, 2011 (France); December 26, 2011 (United States) | 90 minutes |
| The Muppets | United States | James Bobin | The Muppets Studio | Puppetry/Live-action | | Theatrical | November 23, 2011 | 103 minutes |
| Naruto: Blood Prison 劇場版 NARUTO-ナルト- ブラッド・プリズン (Gekijōban Naruto: Buraddo Purizun) | Japan | Masahiko Murata | Studio Pierrot | Traditional | | | July 27, 2011 | 103 minutes |
| Orla Frosnapper; Orla Frosnapper | Denmark | Peter Dodd | Crone Film Produktion A/S | Computer | | | June 1, 2011 | 84 minutes |
| Paul | United States; United Kingdom | Greg Mottola | Universal Pictures | Live-Action-CGI | | | 18 March 2011 | 104 minutes |
| The Painting; Le Tableau | Belgium; France | Jean-François Laguionie | Be-Films, Blue Spirit Animation, uFilm | Computer / Traditional | | | November 23, 2011 | 76 minutes |
| Phineas and Ferb: Across the 2nd Dimension | United States | Dan Povenmire, Robert F. Hughes | Walt Disney Studios Home Entertainment / Walt Disney Television Animation | Traditional | | Television film | August 5, 2011 | 78 minutes |
| Pleasant Goat and Big Big Wolf – Moon Castle: The Space Adventure | China | | | Traditional | | | January 21, 2011 | 88 minutes |
| Pokémon the Movie: Black—Victini and Reshiram 劇場版ポケットモンスター ベストウイッシュ ビクティニと白き英雄 レシラム (Gekijōban Poketto Monsutā Besuto Uisshu Bikutini to Shiroki Eiyū Reshiramu) | Japan | Kunihiko Yuyama | OLM, Inc. | Traditional | | | July 16, 2011 | 92 minutes (each), 184 minutes (total) |
| Pokémon the Movie: White—Victini and Zekrom 劇場版ポケットモンスター ベストウイッシュ ビクティニと黒き英雄 ゼクロム (Gekijōban Poketto Monsutā Besuto Uisshu Bikutini to Kuroki Eiyū Zekuromu) | Japan | Kunihiko Yuyama | OLM, Inc. | Traditional | | | July 16, 2011 | 92 minutes (each), 184 minutes (total) |
| Pretty Cure All Stars DX3: Deliver the Future! The Rainbow-Colored Flower That Connects the World プリキュアオールスターズDX3 未来にとどけ!世界をつなぐ☆虹色の花 (PuriKyua Ōru Sutāzu Dirakkusu Surī: Mirai ni Todoke! Sekai o Tsunagu Niji-Iro no Hana) | Japan | Takashi Otsuka | Toei Animation | Traditional | | | March 19, 2011 | 74 minutes |
| The Prodigies | France; Luxembourg; Belgium | Antoine Charreyron | Fidélité Films, Onyx Films, Studio 37 | Computer | | | May 2011 (Cannes); June 8, 2011 (France) | 87 minutes |
| Puss in Boots | United States | Chris Miller | DreamWorks Animation | Computer | | Theatrical | October 16, 2011 (Allure of the Seas); October 28, 2011 (United States) | 90 minutes |
| Puss in Boots: A Furry Tale | United States | Darrell Van Citters | Renegade Animation | Flash animation | | | October 11, 2011 | 41 minutes |
| The Princess and the Pilot とある飛空士への追憶 (To Aru Hikūshi e no Tsuioku) | Japan | Jun Shishido | Madhouse / TMS Entertainment | Traditional | | | October 1, 2011 | 100 minutes |
| Princess Lillifee and the Little Unicorn; Prinzessin Lillifee und das kleine Einhorn | Germany | Ansgar Niebuhr, Hubert Weiland | Caligari Film, WunderWerk | Traditional | | | September 1, 2011 | 72 minutes |
| The Rabbi's Cat; Le Chat du rabbin | France | Joann Sfar; Antoine Delesvaux | Autochenille Production | Traditional | | | June 1, 2011 | 80 minutes |
| Rango | United States | Gore Verbinski | Nickelodeon Movies / Blind Wink / GK Films / Paramount Pictures | Computer | | Theatrical | February 14, 2011 (Westwood premiere); March 4, 2011 (United States) | 107 minutes 112 minutes (Extended Cut) |
| Rio | United States | Carlos Saldanha | 20th Century Fox / 20th Century Fox Animation / Blue Sky Studios | Computer | | Theatrical | March 22, 2011 (World premiere); April 15, 2011 (North America) | 96 minutes |
| Ronal the Barbarian; Ronal Barbaren | Denmark | Thorbjørn Christoffersen, Kresten Vestbjerg Andersen, Philip Einstein Lipski | Einstein Film | Computer | | | September 29, 2011 | 86 minutes |
| The Smurfs | United States | Raja Gosnell | Sony Pictures Animation | Computer / Live action | | Theatrical | July 29, 2011 | 103 minutes |
| Scooby-Doo! Legend of the Phantosaur | United States | David Block | Warner Bros. Animation; Hanna-Barbera | Traditional | | Direct-to-video | September 3, 2011 | 75 minutes |
| SeeFood | Malaysia | Goh Aun Hoe | Silver Ant | Computer | | | October 7, 2011 | 93 minutes |
| Seer | China | | | Computer | | | July 28, 2011 | 90 minutes |
| Sengoku Basara: The Last Party 戦国BASARA (Sengoku Basara) | Japan | Kazuya Nomura | Production I.G | Traditional | | | June 4, 2011 | 95 minutes |
| Super K – The Movie | India | Vijay S. Bhanushali, Smita Maroo | Shemaroo Entertainment | Computer | | | November 11, 2011 | 95 minutes |
| Tales of the Night; Les Contes de la nuit | France | Michel Ocelot | Nord-Ouest Films, Studio O, StudioCanal | Traditional | | | February 13, 2011 (Berlin); July 20, 2011 (France) | 84 minutes |
| Tappy Toes | United States | Darrell Van Citters | Renegade Animation | Flash animation | | | November 1, 2011 | 41 minutes |
| Tatsumi | Singapore | Eric Khoo | Zhao Wei Films | Traditional | | | May 17, 2011 (Cannes Film Festival) | 98 minutes |
| Tekken: Blood Vengeance 鉄拳 ブラッド・ベンジェンス (Tekken Buraddo Benjensu) | Japan | Youichi Mori | Digital Frontier / Asmik Ace Entertainment | Computer | | | July 26, 2011 (Film premiere); September 3, 2011 (Japan) | 92 minutes |
| Thor: Tales of Asgard | United States | Sam Liu | Marvel Animation / MLG Productions 7, Inc. / Lionsgate Home Entertainment | Traditional | | Direct-to-video | May 17, 2011 | 77 minutes |
| The Tibetan Dog チベット犬物語 〜金色のドージェ〜 (Tibet Inu Monogatari: Kin'iro no Dao Jie) | China; Japan | Masayuki Kojima | Madhouse | Traditional | | | July 15, 2011 (China); January 7, 2012 (Japan) | 90 minutes |
| Titeuf | France | Zep | | Traditional animation | | | April 6, 2011 | 87 minutes |
| Tom and Jerry and the Wizard of Oz | United States | Spike Brandt, Tony Cervone | Warner Bros. Animation, Hanna-Barbera, Turner Entertainment | Traditional | | Direct-to-video | August 23, 2011 | 59 minutes |
| Top Cat: The Movie; Don Gato y Su Pandilla | Mexico; Argentina | Alberto Mar | Anima Estudios; Illusion Studios | Computer / Flash animation | | | September 16, 2011 | 91 minutes |
| The Tragedy of Man hu:Az ember tragédiája | Hungary | Marcell Jankovics | Magyar Rajzfilm Kft; Pannónia Filmstúdió | Traditional | | | November 27, 2011 (Anilogue); December 8, 2011 | 160 minutes |
| Transformers: Dark of the Moon | United States | Michael Bay | Hasbro Studios; Di Bonaventura Pictures; Paramount Pictures | Computer; Live-action | | | June 29, 2011 | 154 minutes |
| VeggieTales: Princess and the Popstar | United States | Brian Roberts | Big Idea Productions | Computer | | Direct-to-video | August 13, 2011 | 49 minutes |
| VeggieTales: The Little Drummer Boy | United States | Brian Roberts | Big Idea Productions | Computer | | Direct-to-video | October 4, 2011 | 45 minutes |
| VeggieTales: 'Twas the Night Before Easter | United States | Mike Nawrocki | Big Idea Productions | Computer | | Direct-to-video | March 8, 2011 | 47 minutes |
| Walter & Tandoori's Christmas; Le Noël de Walter et Tandoori | Canada | Sylvain Viau | Corporation Image Entertainment | Traditional | | | November 2011 | 85 minutes |
| Werner – Eiskalt! | Germany | Gernot Roll | Animationsfabrik, Constantin Film Produktion | Traditional | | | June 23, 2011 | 93 minutes |
| Winnie the Pooh | United States | Stephen Anderson, Don Hall | Walt Disney Pictures / Walt Disney Animation Studios | Traditional | | Theatrical | April 6, 2011 (Belgium); July 15, 2011 (United States) | 63 minutes |
| Wrinkles; Arrugas | Spain | Ignacio Ferreras | Perro Verde Films | Traditional | | | September 19, 2011 (San Sebastián Film Festival) | 89 minutes |
| Old Master Q and Little Ocean Tiger 老夫子之小水虎传奇 | China | Fukutomi Hiroshi | Intercontinental Video | Traditional | | | April 19, 2011 | 86 minutes |

== Highest-grossing films ==
The following is a list of the 11 highest-grossing animated feature films first released in 2011.

| Rank | Title | Studio | Gross |
|---|---|---|---|
| 1 | Kung Fu Panda 2 | Paramount Pictures / DreamWorks Animation | $665,692,281 |
| 2 | Cars 2 | Walt Disney Studios Motion Pictures / Pixar | $562,110,557 |
| 3 | Puss in Boots | Paramount Pictures / DreamWorks Animation | $554,987,477 |
| 4 | Rio | 20th Century Fox / Blue Sky Studios | $487,519,809 |
| 5 | The Adventures of Tintin | Paramount Pictures / Columbia Pictures / Nickelodeon Movies | $373,993,951 |
| 6 | Rango | Paramount Pictures / Nickelodeon Movies / Blind Wink / GK Films | $245,724,603 |
| 7 | Gnomeo and Juliet | Walt Disney Studios Motion Pictures / Touchstone Pictures | $193,967,670 |
| 8 | Happy Feet Two | Warner Bros. Pictures / Village Roadshow Pictures | $150,406,466 |
| 9 | Arthur Christmas | Columbia Pictures / Aardman Animations / Sony Pictures Animation | $147,419,472 |
| 10 | From Up on Poppy Hill | Studio Ghibli | $61,459,425 |
| 11 | Winnie the Pooh | Walt Disney Pictures / Walt Disney Animation Studios | $50,145,607 |

== See also ==
- List of animated television series of 2011
