= David Peters (paleoartist) =

American paleoartist and pseudopaleontologist

David Peters (born 1954) is an American author, artist, and paleoartist notable for his fringe views regarding prehistoric animals, particularly pterosaurs, and phylogeny which he promotes via his blog The Pterosaur Heresies and website ReptileEvolution.com.

== Activities ==
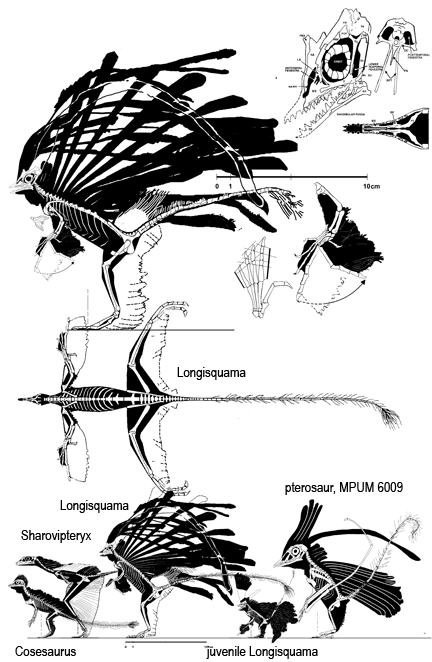
David Peters' restoration of Longisquama (as of 2006) and other reptiles which he claims to be closely related.

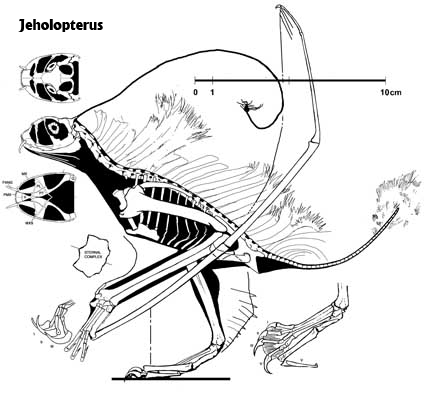
David Peters' interpretation of Jeholopterus (as of 2006)

From the mid-1980s to the late-1990s, Peters authored and illustrated several books on dinosaurs and other prehistoric animals for general audiences. Peters became a regular figure at paleontological conferences during this time and was both well-known and well-regarded in the field for his artwork. In 2003, Peters presented an abstract at the Society of Vertebrate Paleontology annual meeting, during which he proposed that the pterosaur Jeholopterus was hematophagic. Due to the poor reception of the abstract, and further conflicts between Peters and academic paleontologists through the 2000s, appearances at conferences became less frequent and publication in scientific journals more difficult. As a result of these publishing difficulties, Peters started The Pterosaur Heresies WordPress blog in 2011.

Peters has no formal qualifications in paleontology, and does not usually personally examine fossils as do most paleontologists, instead relying on photographs of fossils manipulated in Photoshop. Peters contends that by using image manipulation, specifically a process he refers to as "Digital Graphic Segregation", he can uncover meaningful details in the fossils that paleontologists do not.

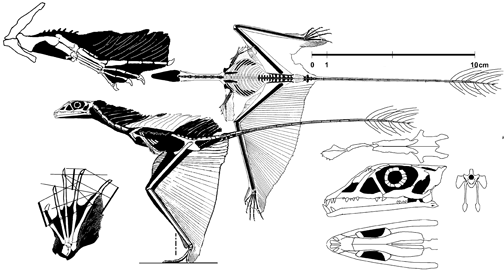
David Peters' interpretation of Sharovipteryx (as of 2006)

== Response by paleontologists ==
The reception of Peters' ideas by academic paleontologists has been universally negative. Dr. S. Christopher Bennett, Professor of Biological Sciences and Associate Curator of Vertebrate Paleontology at Fort Hays State University, described Peters' reconstructions of pterosaurs as "outrageously bizarre like Dr. Seuss's imaginary animals" and described his methodology as flawed and non-reproducible due to its being based on low-resolution photographs, noting in one instance that Peters had interpreted the presence of a baby pterosaur entirely based on marks made during fossil preparation and irregularities in the rock surface, and another in which Peters had interpreted a frill based on a rock surface that had been smoothed and painted.

Brian Andres, a geologist at the University of South Florida who specializes in pterosaur systematics, recalled that Peters had interpreted marks made when he had prepared a fossil as being of biological significance. Paleontologist, author, and science communicator Darren Naish wrote extensive rebuttals to Peters' work in 2012 and 2020. Concern has been raised about Peters' work misleading non-experts.

== In popular culture ==
Director Sid Bennett stated in an interview that the flying creatures in The Dinosaur Project, a 2012 science fiction adventure film, were inspired by Peters' interpretations of Jeholopterus.

== Bibliography ==
As an author and artist:

- Giants of Land, Sea & Air, Past & Present (1986)
- A Gallery of Dinosaurs & Other Early Reptiles (1989)
- From the Beginning: the Story of Human Evolution (1991)
- Strange Creatures (1992)

As an artist:

- Don Lessem's Raptors! The Nastiest Dinosaurs (1996)
- Don Lessem's Supergiants! The Biggest Dinosaurs (1997)

== See also ==
- Chonosuke Okamura
