= Richard Blair-Oliphant =

American composer

- Born: May 28, 1967; U.K.
- Education: Goldsmiths, University of London
- Occupation: Conductor

Richard Blair-Oliphant (born May 28, 1967) is an English film and television composer. He has been a composer on over 40 projects, including the series How the Universe Works and I Shouldn't Be Alive, as well as the televised broadcast of the 62nd Primetime Emmy Awards. His work on the Discovery Channel mini-series, When We Left Earth: The NASA Missions, was nominated for an Emmy award for Outstanding Individual Achievement in a Craft: Music and Sound at the 30th annual News & Documentary Emmy Awards. He is also composer of the music for 2012 movie The Dinosaur Project and the 2004 fantasy/science fiction film The Last Dragon (2004 film) as well as the BBC Election theme used from 2010 until 2017.
