= Trust Fund (film) =

- Directed by: Sandra L. Martin
- Written by: Sandra L. Martin
- Produced by: Isaac Alongi
- Starring: Jessica Rothe; Louise Dylan; Kevin Kilner; Ana Ortiz; Matt Kane
- Cinematography: Isaac Alongi
- Music by: Nathan Matthew David
- Production company: KC Film Office
- Release date: 8 January 2016
- Running time: 107 minutes
- Country: United States
- Language: English

Trust Fund is a 2016 American drama film directed by Sandra L. Martin, starring Jessica Rothe, Louise Dylan and Kevin Kilner. It is also known as Prodigal Girl on some streaming platforms, like Tubi.

== Cast ==
- Jessica Rothe as Reese Donahue
- Louise Dylan as Audrey Donahue
- Kevin Kilner as Grayson Donahue
- Sean Wing as Milo
- Matt Kane as Sam
- Ana Ortiz as Meredith
- Willie Garson as Jerry
- Esther Scott as Gloria
- Louisa Mignone as Sophia
- Rose Abdoo as Angela
- Jordi Caballero as Marcello
- Kosha Patel as Allie
- Matthew Alan as Jonathan

== Reception ==
Renee Longstreet of Common Sense Media rated the film 2 stars out of 5 and wrote that it "lacks logic and depth".

Edwin L. Carpenter of Dove.org called the film "relevant" in "so many ways".
