= Mermaids: The Body Found =

2012 television film directed by Sid Bennett

- Written by: Charlie Foley; Vaibhav Bhatt
- Story by: Charlie Foley; Vaibhav Bhatt
- Directed by: Sid Bennett; Director of Animation - Steve Gomez
- Country of origin: United States
- Original language: English

Production
- Producers: Darlow Smithson, Tom Brisley
- Running time: 90 minutes

Original release
- Network: Animal Planet
- Release: May 27, 2012

Mermaids: The Body Found is a pseudo-documentary television program originally aired on American TV channels Animal Planet (May 27, 2012) and Discovery Channel (June 17, 2012). It tells a story of a scientific team's investigative efforts to uncover the source behind mysterious underwater recordings of an unidentified marine body. The show presents the controversial aquatic ape hypothesis as evidence that mermaids exist, along with a digitally manufactured video. A sequel broadcast called Mermaids: The New Evidence aired May 26, 2013.

Mermaids: The Body Found and its sequel Mermaids: The New Evidence are examples of what is known as docufiction, in which documentary style and programming elements are combined with fictional – or sometimes, less egregiously, speculative – science and fiction. This type of programming receives particular criticism when, as in the original broadcast of Mermaids: The Body Found, there are only a few, easily missed disclaimers to indicate the speculative nature of the programming. On the contrary, the serious tone of the majority of the presentation implied that it was a factual documentary. The first airings of the two Mermaids programs apparently gathered the attention of millions of people and also drew some of Animal Planet's largest audiences ever.

== Ratings ==
Mermaids: The Body Found received 1.9 million views during its US telecast premiere on May 27, 2012. This is the network's most watched telecast since the Steve Irwin memorial special in September 2006.

== Criticism ==
Animal Planet has been criticized for giving the impression that Mermaids was an actual documentary, when in fact much of the material was made up, and the scientists shown were actors. Publicity for the program included a website falsely claiming government seizure of the site's domain, and the US National Oceanic and Atmospheric Administration put up a rebuttal to the program.

== See also ==
- Megalodon: The Monster Shark Lives
- The Last Dragon
