= El Bosquet =

Small settlement in Catalonia, Spain

Coordinates: 41°16′49″N 1°4′54″E

El Bosquet is a populated entity of the municipality of Mont-ral, Alt Camp, province of Tarragona, Catalonia, Spain. In 2005, it had 24 inhabitants.

It is located southwest of the urban center of Mont-ral, near L'Aixàviga, under the rocky wall of els Motllats. It has a dozen houses with rural architecture.
