= Vasoon Animation =

Chinese animation studio

- Type: Private
- Industry: Animation
- Founded: 1992
- Headquarters: Beijing, China
- Key people: Wu Hanqing (Founder and CEO); Stefanie Zhang (Head of Overseas)
- Website: www.vasoon.com

Vasoon Animation is a privately owned Chinese animation studio that was established in Beijing in 1992.

== History ==
Vasoon Animation was officially formed by Wang Chuan, Wu Hanqing, Kuang Yuqi, Zhang Jianwei and Wu Guanying in 1992, making Vasoon Animation China's oldest private animation studio. The 180 employees of Vasoon Animation are involved with all aspects of animations including editing, planning, design, production and direction. The animators of Vasoon enjoy the challenge of experimenting with wide range of animation styles, including modern realism, Chinese modern painting style, and comic realism. The company produces and distributes a complete array of animated entertainment products including animated feature films, animated TV series, artistic short films, illustrated books and animated interactive applications. Organizations including China Film Group Corporation, Shanghai Media Group, CCTV and BTV have collaborated with Vasoon Animation during various television and film projects.

One of Vasoon Animation's most notable features is "Kuiba", also known as 魁拔. The film "Kuiba" tells the story of how a boy saves a fantasy world from an evil monster. The film borrows the Japanese "hot-blooded" style, refreshing the audience's views on Chinese animation. It is the pioneer of Chinese Anime, influential for many late comers in the cinema. "Kuiba" has been critically acclaimed, however it commercially fell below expectations. It was reported that Wu received minority help from a venture capital fund at Tsinghua University to complete "Kuiba." "Kuiba" also holds the distinction of being the first big Chinese animation series to enter the Japanese market. "Kuiba" not only has 156 episodes for television but also five feature-length films. China.org ranked "Kuiba" as one of the top ten Chinese movies made in 2011.

In October 2012, Vasoon Animation signed a co-production deal with French animation studio Folimage Studio. The two sides will work together to determine the future of four co-produced animated features.

Vasoon Animation released Kuiba 2 on May 31, 2013. The film made over 18 Million Yuan the first week. The film was not only the first Chinese animated feature which was viewed in 3D, but also the first Chinese animated feature with Dolby Atmos. "Kuiba 2" won the Magnolia Award at the 19th Shanghai Television Festival.

In 2023, Vasoon Animation partnered with producer Tintin Li from New Zealand to reactivate three feature animation titles "God Hunter",“A Bear in My Family",and "Ksitigarbha".

== Filmography ==
- The Flying Monkid (1995)
- Transparent Shield (1999)
- Scholar Cat (1997 - 2001)
- The Guardian (2000)
- Seven and a Half (2001)
- Trees (2002)
- The Bird (2003)
- Spring Mood (2004)
- Red Scarf (2011)
- Kuiba (2011)
- Kuiba 2 (2013)
- Kuiba 3 (2014)
- Kuiba 4 (2020)

== Awards ==
- Asian TV Animation Association's highest award for animation in Scholar Cat for Chinese Ideogram (1998)
- Beijing Chunyan Cup Award for best script "Scholar Cat for Chinese Ideogram
- Nominee for the 1st China Animation Academy Honorary Award Secret Wars, Xiaoming and his Patron Cat
- Jingying Award of Excellence in Hero 7½ × Heroes 7½ (2003)
- Beijing Chunyan Award of excellence and Excellent Director in Hero 7½ × Heroes 7½ (2004)
- The 1st PUBLIC AWARD FOR BEST SHORT FILM and JURY AWARD FOR BEST SHORT FILM, 10th ASIAN FILM & CULTURE FESTIVAL, Lyon, France, The Bird, The 2nd PUBLIC AWARD FOR BEST SHORT FILM Trees (2004)
- The Nomination of the Best Animated Film of China Film HuaBiao Award The Bird (2004)
- The Best Animation awards of the 3rd CTVA Academy Awards for short animation, China, The Bird, The 2nd Animation awards Trees (2004)
- Selected for the 21st International Short Film Festival Hamburg The Bird (2005)
- Selected for the T I N D I R I N D I S 2005—International Animated Film Festival In Vilnius, Lithuania, The Bird, Trees (2005)
- Selected for the 11th International Short Film Festival in Drama, Athens, The Bird (2005)
- Selected for the Short Film Festival EXPO, Japan The Bird, Trees (2005)
- Selected for the 24th edition of ANIMA 2005, the Brussels Festival of Cartoon and Animated Films, The Bird (2004)
- The Most Popular Film and Nomination of the Best Producing Film of the 3rd Animation Academy Awards, Animation School of Beijing Film Academy, Trees (2003)
- Magnolia Award winner at The 19th Shanghai TV Festival "Kuiba 2" (2013)
