= Kuiba =

- Poster
- Starring: Seira Ryū
- Production company: Vasoon Animation
- Release date: July 8, 2011 (China)
- Running time: 90 minutes
- Country: China
- Language: Mandarin Chinese
- Budget: CNY55 million
- Box office: CNY3.5 million

Kuiba (Chinese: 魁拔) or Greatbug is a 2011 Chinese animated film. It was released on July 8, 2011. The film was followed by Kuiba 2 in 2013 and Kuiba 3 in 2014, with a fourth film, Kuiba 4, scheduled for release in 2020.

== Plot ==
Every 333 years the ultimate universal devil known as Kuiba is reborn. With each rebirth, Kuiba brings absolute destruction. In order to battle Kuiba, deities and people team up to assassinate him just before his revival. In 1664, the year of Kuiba's rebirth, the assassination attempt failed and it was reborn as the child Manji. Manji is unaware of his true identity and is adopted by Man Xiaoman, a mediocre Spirit Warrior, and he is trained in Pulsecraft.

When Manji is physically prevented from joining the armies of Earth because of his poor skills, Kuiba's pulse beast is released from within and they merge. The beast controlled by Manji attacks the combined forces of the Spirit Warriors, but Man Xiaoman rallies them and they destroy the beast. This releases Manji who then joins him and the Earth forces to destroy Kuiba.

== Cast ==
Manji(蛮吉) -

Man Xiaoman(蛮小满) -

Princess Lilia(离离艾) -

Keraschok Pan(卡拉肖克·潘) -

== Reception ==
The film earned CN¥4.987 million at the Chinese box office.
