= Richard Dillane =

English actor

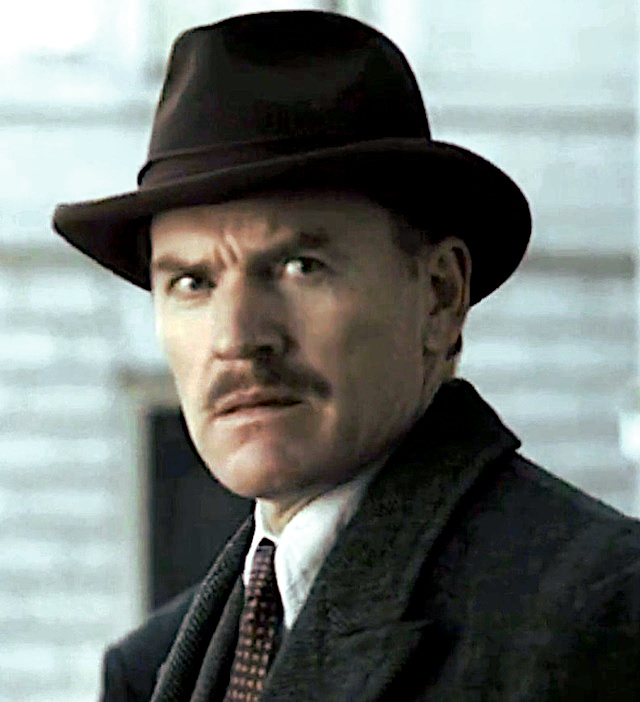
- Richard Dillane in Foyle's War (2013)
- Born: Kent, England
- Occupation: Actor
- Years active: 1995-present
- Spouse: Jayne McKenna
- Children: 3
- Relatives: Stephen Dillane (brother); Frank Dillane (nephew)

Richard Dillane is an English actor. He appears in Soldier Soldier (1995), Cold Feet (2000), Space Race (2005), Tristan & Isolde (2006), Spooks (2007), Casualty (2008-2009), Oranges and Sunshine (2010), Doctor Who (2011), Argo (2012), Dead in Tombstone (2013), Wolf Hall (2015), Peaky Blinders, Poldark (2016), Giri/Haji (2019), Young Wallander (2020), The Crown, and Andor (2022-2025).

== Early life and education ==
Dillane is from Kent, and grew up near London with his brother Stephen (also an actor). Their mother is English and their father was born in Australia to Irish parents. He took a philosophy degree at Manchester University, and lived in Australia for ten years, working in white-water rafting as a guide, also as an actor and director.

== Career ==
In 2020, he appears in a lead role of the Netflix series Young Wallander, based on the character Kurt Wallander created by novelist Henning Mankell. He played British intelligence agent Peter Nicholls in Ben Affleck's Oscar-winning 2012 political thriller Argo, and Merv Humphreys, husband of Margaret Humphreys (played by Emily Watson) in Jim Loach's fact-based movie Oranges and Sunshine.

He was Wernher von Braun in the BBC television docudrama Space Race, Nero in Howard Brenton's play Paul at the National Theatre of Great Britain and appeared several times as Stephen Maturin in the BBC radio adaptations of the Patrick O'Brian Aubrey–Maturin novels and Peter Guillam in three John le Carré adaptations. Dillane's other film work includes The Dark Knight (as Acting Commissioner), Mindscape with Mark Strong, The Dinosaur Project, The Edge of Love, The Jacket, Tristan & Isolde (2006), and as Cole Porter's last lover Bill Wrather (a composite character) in Irwin Winkler's biopic De-Lovely, which starred Kevin Kline.

Recent television work includes Giri/Haji, The Last Kingdom, Peaky Blinders, Counterpart, Outlander, The Last Post, and Star Wars: Andor.

In 2015, he played Duke of Suffolk in the BBC TV series Wolf Hall, and in 2016 he appeared in the lead role of DCI Michael Waite in a double episode of the BBC TV series Silent Witness.

Prior to this, he played the captain of the shape-changing justice robot Teselecta in two episodes of Doctor Who ("Let's Kill Hitler" and "The Wedding of River Song"), rogue spy John Richardson in Spooks (2007), Australian conman Graham Poole in Hustle, photographer and old flame Miles Brodie in Cold Feet, posh drug addict Theodore Platt in the first episode of Lewis and the relationship counsellor Ben in Men Behaving Badly, as well as regular characters Sean Anderson in Casualty, and Australian sergeant Brad Connor in the ITV series Soldier Soldier.

On stage, Dillane has performed at the National Theatre of Great Britain in London and the Royal Shakespeare Company in Stratford-upon-Avon. In 2000, he was the 1st Duke of Suffolk in the Olivier Award-winning Michael Boyd productions of Henry VI parts 1, 2 and 3 in Stratford, London and Michigan. He played Hamlet in Perth, Australia, directed by Ray Omodei.

He is also a regular radio actor and voice-over artist.

== Personal life ==
His essay 'Making Sense of "To be or not to be"', about Hamlet's soliloquy, was published in Shakespeare and Montaigne (eds. Patrick Gray, Lars Engle and William M. Hamlin, Edinburgh University Press, 2021).ISBN 978-1474458238

He is married to Scottish actress Jayne McKenna, and they live in Brighton, East Sussex (in 2015). They were married in 2005 and have three children, all boys: Austin, Murray and Ray.

== Filmography ==
=== Film ===
Year	Title	Role	Notes
1998	Emmerdale: Revenge	D.S. Dan Campbell	Direct-to-Video
1999	Wing Commander	Lieutenant Hunter	
2000	Seeing Red	Steve	TV film
2001	Doc Martin	Tim	TV film
2002	George Eliot: A Scandalous Life	John Cross	TV film
2004	EMR	Victor	
2004	De-Lovely	Bill Wrather	
2005	The Jacket	Captain Medley	
2005	Our Hidden Lives	S	TV film
2006	Tristan & Isolde	Aragon	
2006	One Hundredth of a Second	Connor	Short film
2008	The Edge of Love	Lieutenant Colonel David Talbot Rice	
2008	The Dark Knight	Acting Commissioner	
2009	Free Agents	Theatre Actor	TV film
2009	Moonshot	Tom Stafford	TV film
2009	Mad, Sad & Bad	Roger	
2010	Oranges and Sunshine	Merv	
2012	The Dinosaur Project	Jonathan Marchant	
2012	Argo	OSS Officer Nicholls	
2013	Dead in Tombstone	Jack Sutter	Direct-to-Video
2013	Mindscape	Robert	
2014	United Passions	Larsen	
2014	Altar	Greg	
2014	The Last Hand	John	Short film
2017	Against the Law	Prosecutor Roberts	TV film
2018	Mother's Day	Dr. Tarring	TV film
2019	The Last Vermeer	Colonel Jenkins	
2020	The Show	Flash Avenger	
2020	The Forgotten Battle	Sinclair	
2021	Munich – The Edge of War	Colonel Menzies	

=== Television ===
Year	Title	Role	Notes
1995	Soldier Soldier	Sergeant Brad Connor	Recurring role; 10 episodes
1997	Heartbeat	Terry	Episode: "Peace and Quiet"
1997	Men Behaving Badly	Ben	Episode: "Ten"
1997	Solomon	Jeroboam	Mini-series
1998	The Grand	Sean Villiers	Series 2, Episode 6
1998	Big Women	Brian	Mini-series
1998	Verdict	Robert Horton-Smith	Episode: "Split Second"
1999	An Evil Streak	David Mereday	Mini-series
2000	Cold Feet	Miles Brodie	Recurring role; 2 episodes
2003	Jean Moulin, une affaire française	Anthony Harper	Mini-series
2003	Red Cap	Captain Finbar Glover	Episode: "Cover Story"
2003	Adventure Inc.	Michael Drake	Episode: "Spirit of the Mask"
2004	Spartacus	Julius Caesar	Episode: "Julius Caesar"
2005	Space Race	Wernher von Braun	Series regular
2006	Hustle	Graham Poole	Episode: "Law and Corruption"
2007	Casualty	Anthony Sharman	Episode: "The Silence of Friends"
2007	Waking the Dead	Ricardo Rivelli	Episode: "Mask of Sanity"
2007	Lewis	Theodore Platt	Episode: "Whom the Gods Would Destroy"
2007	Rome	Centurion Vallo	Episode: "De Patre Vostro"
2007	Spooks	John Richardson	Episode: "The Broadcast"
2008	Agatha Christie's Poirot	Major Summerhayes	Episode: "Mrs McGinty's Dead"
2008–2009	Casualty	Sean Anderson	Series regular
2011	Doctor Who	Carter	Recurring role; 2 episodes
2012	DCI Banks	DCI Stuart Burgess	Episode: "Dry Bones That Dream"
2013	Midsomer Murders	Oliver Ordish	Episode: "Schooled in Murder"
2013	Foyle's War	Charles Roper	Series 7 Episode 3: "Sunflower"
2013	Atlantis	Pallos	Episode: "A Boy of No Consequence"
2014	Vera	Will Peyton	Episode: "The Deer Hunters"
2014	New Tricks	Lawrence Devlin	Episode: "Tender Loving Care"
2015	Wolf Hall	Charles Brandon, 1st Duke of Suffolk	Series regular
2015	Partners in Crime	Bulldog	Episode: "The Secret Adversary"
2016	Endeavour	Leo Richardson	Episode: "Arcadia"
2016	Silent Witness	DCI Michael Waite	Episode: "Flight"
2016	Peaky Blinders	General Curran	Episode: "Series 3, Episode 1"
2016	Poldark	Henry Bull	Episode: "Series 2, Episode 2"
2016	Berlin Station	Gerald Ellman	Episode: "Station to Station"
2016	Daye's Work	DI Harry Daye	Episode: "Pilot"
2017	The White Princess	Sir Thomas Stanley	Series regular
2017	The Last Post	Harvey Tilbrook	Series regular
2017	Outlander	Captain Raines	Recurring role; 2 episodes
2018	Counterpart	Ricky Langston	Episode: "Something Borrowed"
2019	West of Liberty	Ron Herriman	Series regular
2019	Twice Upon a Time	David Arron	Recurring role; 2 episodes
2019	Strike Back	Whitehall	Recurring role; 2 episodes
2019	Giri/Haji	Brian	Series 1, Episode 3
2020	The Last Kingdom	Ludeca	Recurring role; 4 episodes
2020	Betaal	Colonel Lynedoch	Series regular
2020	Young Wallander	Hemberg	Series regular
2021	Call the Midwife	Mr. Scarisbrick	Recurring role; 2 episodes
2021	Dalgliesh	Dr. Stephen Courtney-Briggs	Episode: "Shroud for a Nightingale"
2022	Father Brown	Sir Charles Hakeworth	Episode: "The Red Death"
2022	Pennyworth	Patrick Wayne	Recurring role; 5 episodes
2022	The Crown	George V	Episode: "Ipatiev House"
2022–2025	Andor	Davo Sculdun	Recurring role; 5 episodes
2023–present	The Diplomat	Tom Libby	4 episodes

== Theatre credits ==
Year	Title	Role	Venue	Ref
1996	Twelfth Night	Antonio	Royal Shakespeare Theatre, Royal Shakespeare Theatre	
1996	Troilus and Cressida	Diomedes	Royal Shakespeare Theatre, Royal Shakespeare Theatre	
2000	Henry VI	Suffolk	Swan Theatre, Stratford-upon-Avon	
2001	Double Indemnity	Walter Huff	Playhouse, Salisbury & New Wolsey Theatre, Ipswich	
2001	Richard III	Rivers	Young Vic, London	
2002	Measure for Measure Malaya	Angelo	Riverside Studios, London	
2004	Uncle Varick	Dr. Michael	Royal Lyceum Theatre, Edinburgh	
2005	Paul	Nero	Royal National Theatre, London	
2006	The Taming of the Shrew	Petruchio	Theatre Royal, Bristol	
2012	The Lady from the Sea	Arnholm	Rose Theatre, Kingston upon Thames	
