= The Last Dragon (2004 film) =

- Title Screen
- Genre: Fantasy, science fiction
- Created by: Charlie Foley
- Developed by: Charlie Foley; David McNab; Justin Hardy; Kevin Tao Mohs
- Directed by: Justin Hardy
- Starring: Paul Hilton; Katrine Bach; Aiden Woodward
- Narrated by: Ian Holm (English release); Patrick Stewart (U.S. release)
- Original language: English

Production
- Executive producers: John Smithson; David McNab; Alice Keens-Soper
- Producer: Ceri Barnes
- Running time: 99 mins
- Production company: Darlow Smithson Productions

Original release
- Network: Channel 4 Animal Planet
- Release: 1 December 2004

The Last Dragon, known as Dragons: A Fantasy Made Real in the United States, and also known as Dragon's World in other countries, is a 2004 British docufiction made by Darlow Smithson Productions for Channel Four and broadcast on both Channel Four and Animal Planet.

It posits a speculative evolution of dragons from the Cretaceous period up to the 15th century, and suppositions about what dragon life and behaviour might have been like if they had existed and evolved. It uses the premise that the ubiquity of dragons in world mythology suggests that dragons could have existed. They are depicted as a scientifically feasible species of reptile that could have evolved, somewhat similar to the depiction of dragons in the Dragonology series of books. The dragons featured in the show were designed by John Sibbick.

The programme switches between two stories. The first uses CGI to show the dragons in their natural habitat throughout history. The second shows the story of a modern-day scientist at a museum, Dr. Jack Tanner, who believes in dragons. When the frozen remains of an unknown creature are discovered in the Carpathian Mountains, Tanner and two colleagues from the museum undertake the task of examining the specimen to try to save his reputation. Once there, they discover that the creature is a dragon. Tanner and his colleagues set about working out how it lived and died.

== Plot summary ==
The docufiction features two interwoven stories. Jack Tanner, an American paleontologist working for the Natural History Museum in London, suggests the theory that a carbonised Tyrannosaurus rex skeleton on display was killed by a prehistoric dragon, causing him to believe that the legends were more than myth. This ruins Tanner's reputation. As viewed in a flashback, Tanner's theory is proven true, as said Tyrannosaurus battles a female dragon in the Cretaceous but is mortally wounded. The female, with two legs and two wings, dies from her wounds, forcing her son to survive on his own, escaping an aggressive male dragon by learning how to fly for the first time. This is aided by bacteria that can produce hydrogen, aiding buoyancy. A later vignette shows the dragon, now an adult, trying to mate, and successfully challenging a dominant male in a sky duel.

The museum is contacted by Romanians, who discovered the corpse of a dragon in the Carpathian Mountains, along with many carbonised human bodies from the 15th century. Tanner and two colleagues are sent to examine the bodies, which have been moved to a warehouse. The scientists are baffled by the corpse, discovering that despite being 900 pounds (410 kg), it was capable of both flight and breathing fire by storing bacteria and hydrogen inside its body, like the prehistoric dragon.

The prehistoric dragon was a victim of the K-T Event, but he had a cousin, the marine dragon, which was protected by living in the ocean. It eventually evolved into other species, such as the Chinese forest dragon, able to glide with her smaller wings and capable of camouflaging herself in the dappled forest light. The forest dragon hunts the wild boar and the South China tiger, but the arrival of humans in the forest challenges her survival. Another descendant is the mountain dragon, which has four legs and fully-functional wings, and inhabits the Carpathian and Atlas mountains.

By analyzing the dead dragon's reproductive system, Tanner concludes the corpse is actually that of a baby, having been killed by the humans. The scientists travel back to the mountains to explore the caves where the corpses were found. A flashback shows that in 1475, a lone female dragon is living on the verge of extinction within the Carpathian Mountains, looking for a mate. A male arrives from the Atlas Mountains and they perform an airborne courtship ritual. They grasp each other's talons and free-fall from the sky at high speed. Just before touchdown they break free and fly off together, breathing fire and leaving scorch marks on rocks below. While scouring the cave system, Tanner discovers a preserved dragon egg. It is surmised that the male dragon guards the nest, made from a cluster of rocks and the eggs are kept warm for preservation. However, the male is negligent, letting one of the eggs die, and is chased away by the female.

Some time later, the female dragon has had a lone daughter, hunting sheep from the local shepherds, leading to dragon slayers being hired to kill any dragons that get too close to the livestock. The lord and his squire attack, slaying the young female but are in turn killed by the mother. Tanner discovers more human corpses and then that of the mother dragon, twice the size of the baby. In a final flashback, a larger group of dragon slayers approach the cave, leading to the deaths of all involved. Tanner and his team take the dragons to the museum, reuniting mother and daughter. A year later, Tanner receives information of another discovery and sets off to investigate.

== Reception ==
The Scotsman opined that The Last Dragon's computer graphics made it "awesome", but ultimately the show gave the feeling of conveying the message "Do not believe this slice of old hokum" to the viewer. According to The New York Times "it's easy to forget that [the film] isn't a serious documentary" after the fiction disclaimer at the beginning, judging the computer graphics to be well made, sometimes beautiful, but not impressive "to the point of wonder".

== Awards and nominations ==
Year	Award	Category	Result	Ref.
3rd Visual Effects Society Awards	Outstanding Visual Effects in a Broadcast Miniseries, Movie or Special	Sirio Quintavelle, Alex Knox, Neil Glaseby	Nominated	
57th Primetime Emmy Awards	Primetime Emmy Award for Outstanding Animated Program	David McNab, John Smithson, Alice Keens-Soper, Rola Bauer and Tim Halkin, Charlie Foley, Justin Hardy, Kevin Tao Mohs, Aiden Woodward, Mike Milne	Nominated	
57th Primetime Emmy Awards	Primetime Emmy Award for Outstanding Special Visual Effects	Laurent Benhamo, Neil Glasby, Daren Horley, Alec Knox, Dan Lavender, Christian Manz, Catherine Mullan, Sirio Quintavalle, Sarah Tosh	Nominated	

== See also ==
- List of films featuring dinosaurs
- Mermaids: The Body Found (2012), a similar programme airing on Animal Planet, also with Charlie Foley's involvement, which attempted to describe mermaids in a scientific manner
- The Flight of Dragons (1979 book)
