= Femur condyle =

Femur condyle may refer to:

- Lateral condyle of femur
- Medial condyle of femur
