= Matt Kane =

English actor (born 1991)

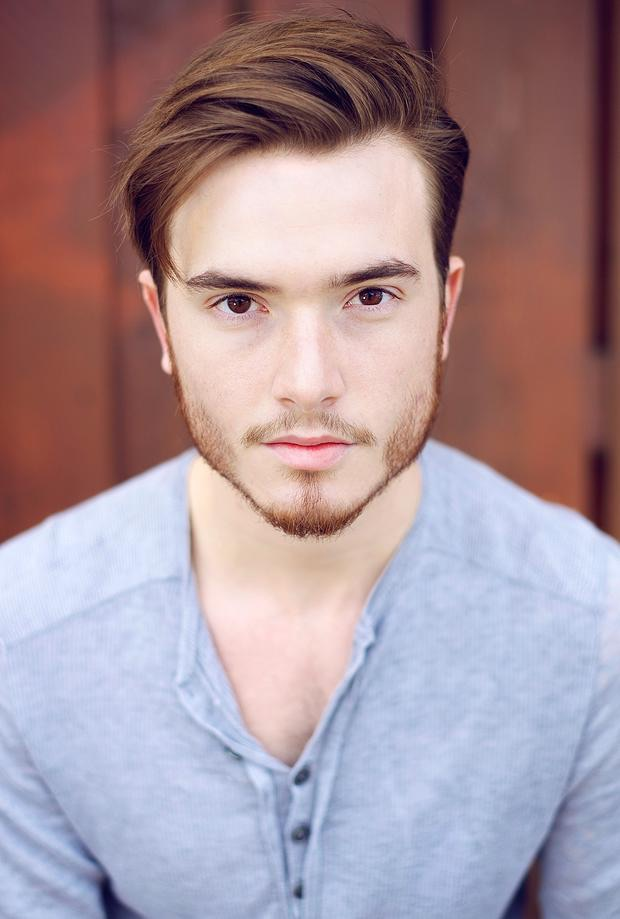
- Kane in 2014
- Born: Matthew Robert Kane; 18 January 1991 (age 35); Bristol, United Kingdom
- Citizenship: Dual United States and British
- Education: The Castle School
- Occupation: Actor
- Years active: 2001–present

Matt Kane (born Matthew Robert Kane, 18 January 1991) is an English-American actor, writer and director with US dual citizenship.

== Early life ==
Kane was born in Bristol and educated at The Castle School, and attended acting classes at the ITV West Television Workshop in Bristol, where he performed in numerous theatre productions and short films.

== Career ==
Kane is best known for playing the main role of 18-year-old Stephen Mackinnon in the BBC teen drama series The Cut, alongside Samuell Benta, Lara Goodison, Connor Scarlett and Tosin Cole. He appeared prominently in the first two seasons of the drama series, but had a less important role in Series 3, appearing in four episodes out of twelve. His acting experience includes appearances in the BBC drama Casualty, Channel 4's Skins, the independent film The Dinosaur Project as Luke, Jace in ABC Family's Switched at Birth and as John Darling in Season 3 of ABC's Once Upon a Time. His feature directorial debut Auggie was released by Samuel Goldwyn Films in 2019.

== Filmography ==
- The Last of Robin Hood (2013)
- Once Upon a Time- John Darling
- Switched at Birth- Jace
- The Dinosaur Project
- Trust Fund (2016)
- Auggie (2019) as director/writer
