= Mont-ral =

- Municipality
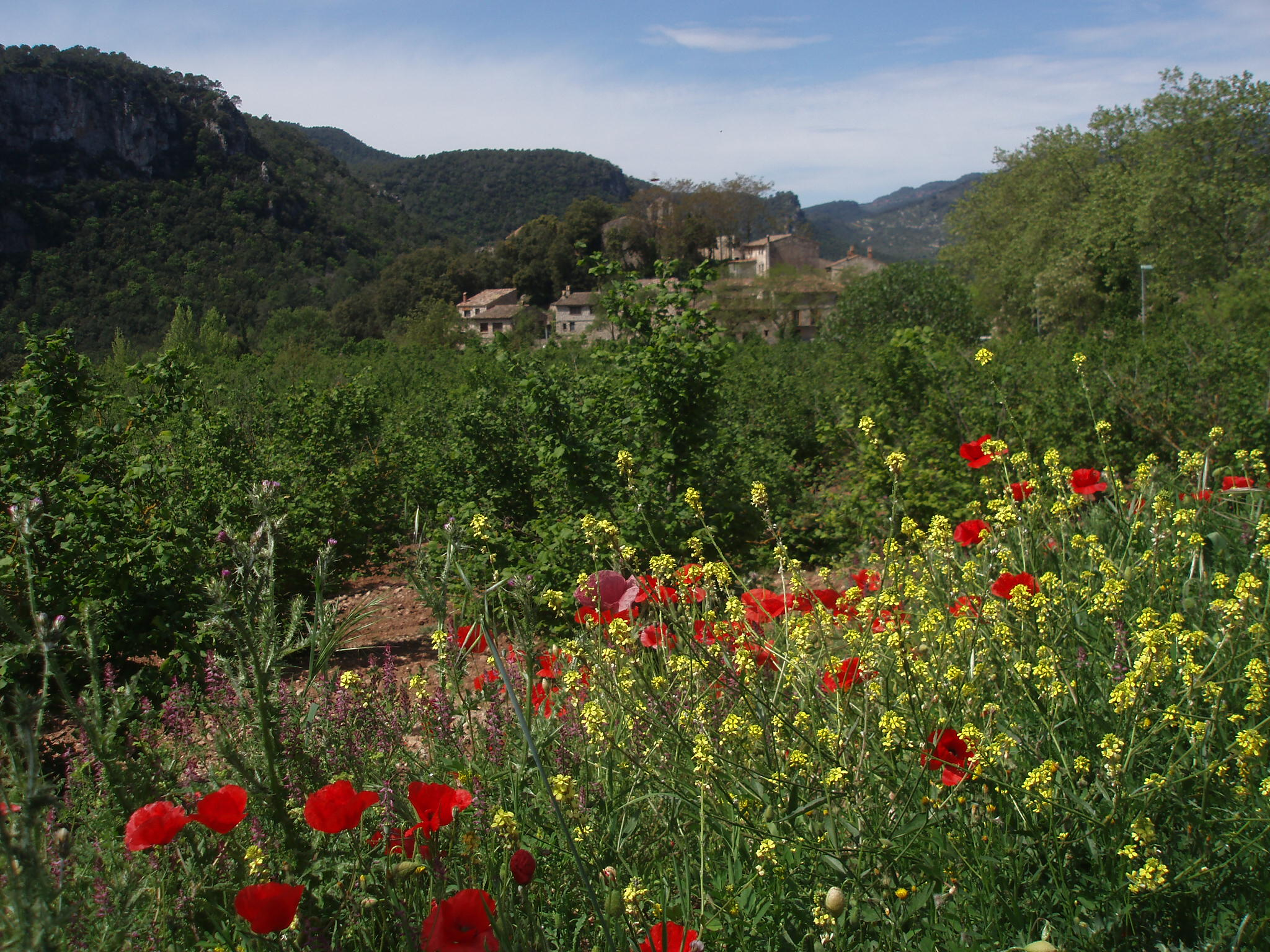
- View of La Farena village

- Coat of arms

- Location in Spain Mont-ral (Spain)
- Coordinates: 41.289°N 1.099°E
- Country: Spain
- Autonomous community: Catalonia
- Province: Tarragona
- Comarca: Alt Camp

Government
  - Mayor: Francesc Xavier Pagès Alonso (2015)

Area
  - Total: 34.7 km^{2} (13.4 sq mi)
- Elevation: 888 m (2,913 ft)

Population (2025-01-01)
  - Total: 174
  - Density: 5.01/km^{2} (13.0/sq mi)
- Demonym: Mont-ralenc
- Postal code: 43364
- Website: www.mont-ral.altanet.org

Mont-ral (Catalan pronunciation: [munˈral]) is a municipality in the comarca of Alt Camp, Tarragona, Catalonia, Spain. It has a population of 174 (register office, 2025).

The Prades Mountains are located within the municipal boundaries.

== History ==
Mont-ral was part of the Montblanc Vegueria until 1716. Later it became part of the Tarragona Corregiment administrative division.

This municipality had over 1,000 inhabitants during the second half of the 19th century, but has lost almost 80% of its population since then.

== Villages ==
- L'Aixàviga, 14
- El Bosquet, 24
- La Cabrera, 3
- La Cadeneta, 12
- Farena 46
- Mont-ral 81
