= Kuiba 2 =

- Poster
- 魁拔之大战元泱界
- Directed by: Chuan Wang
- Release date: May 31, 2013
- Running time: 83 minutes
- Country: China
- Language: Mandarin
- Box office: CN¥25.298 million

Kuiba 2 (Chinese: 魁拔之大战元泱界) is a 2013 Chinese animated fantasy action adventure film directed by Chuan Wang. It was released on May 31, 2013. The film is part of the Kuiba film series, following Kuiba (2011) and preceding Kuiba 3 (2014).

== Plot ==
Manji and friends land on isles. There they face off against Kuiba's servants.

== Voice cast ==
- Jingluo Liu
- Xiaoyu Liu
- Kai Wang
- Lei Ao
- Aohui Qu
- Zhengjian Guo
- Chen Yang

== Reception ==
The film earned CN¥25.298 million at the Chinese box office.
