= Kuiba 3 =

- Directed by: Wang Chuan; Zhang Gang; Zhou Jie
- Production companies: Vasoon Animation; Tianjin Vasoon Animation Co., Ltd
- Release date: October 1, 2014 (China)
- Running time: 90 minutes
- Country: China
- Box office: CN¥24.298 million

Kuiba 3 (Chinese: 魁拔III战神崛起) is a 2014 Chinese animated fantasy action adventure film directed by Wang Chuan, Zhang Gang and Zhou Jie. It was released on October 1 in China. The film is preceded by Kuiba 2 (2013) and will be followed by Kuiba 4, scheduled for release in 2020.

== Voice cast ==
- Liu Jingluo
- Yao Shu
- Wang Yuteng
- Yang Chen
- Liu Xiaoyu
- Wang Kai
- Ao Lei
- Shi Kunkun
- Song Ming
- Ma Haifeng
- Yang Ning
- Jie A
- Fan Zhechen
- Tute Hameng
- Jiang Guangtao

== Reception ==
The film earned CN¥24.298 million at the Chinese box office.
