= Sid Bennett (director) =

British film and television director, producer, and writer

Sid Bennett is a film and television director, producer and writer.

== Career ==
Sid Bennett has written, directed and produced mainstream TV programmes in the US, UK and worldwide. His two-hour film Mermaids: The Body Found, a fantasy drama made in documentary-format, netted one of Discovery Channel/Animal Planet's biggest cross-platform audiences in its history. Sid Bennett's other TV highlights include Predator X, I Shouldn't Be Alive, Man vs. Wild, NASA space documentary Houston, We Have A Problem and Lucy Worsley's Fireworks For A Tudor Queen. He has received over 20 international awards and nominations for his documentaries and drama. He has also written several award-winning screenplays and scripts, drama and documentary, some of which are in pre-production or already produced.

Sid Bennett made his feature film directorial debut with The Dinosaur Project (2012), a found footage science fiction film. The low-budget, high-concept thriller filmed on location in South Africa initially received mixed reviews, but has since acquired cult movie status.

Sid Bennett is also the author of the book Mermaids: Discovery, a conspiracy thriller which follows on from the TV Movie Mermaids: The Body Found.
