= The Dinosaur Project =

2012 British film directed by Sid Bennet

- UK theatrical release poster
- Directed by: Sid Bennett
- Written by: Sid Bennett; Jay Basu
- Story by: Sid Bennett; Tom Pridham
- Produced by: Nick Hill
- Starring: Richard Dillane; Peter Brooke; Matthew Kane; Natasha Loring; Stephen Jennings; Andre Weideman; Abena Ayivor; Sivu Nobongoza
- Cinematography: Tom Pridham
- Edited by: Ben Lester
- Music by: Richard Blair-Oliphant
- Production companies: Moonlighting Films; Kent Films; LoveFilm; Anton Capital Entertainment; Dinosaur Productions
- Distributed by: StudioCanal
- Release date: 10 August 2012 (United Kingdom)
- Running time: 83 minutes
- Country: United Kingdom
- Language: English
- Box office: $2.4 million

The Dinosaur Project is a 2012 British found footage science fiction adventure film directed by Sid Bennett, who also co-wrote the film with Jay Basu. It stars Richard Dillane, Peter Brooke, Matthew Kane, Natasha Loring, Stephen Jennings, Andre Weideman with Abena Ayivor and Sivu Nobongoza.

The Dinosaur Project was shot in South Africa. The visual effects for the film were provided by Jellyfish Pictures. The film received a theatrical release in the United Kingdom on 10 August 2012 by StudioCanal. It garnered mixed reviews from critics and grossed $2.4 million worldwide. StudioCanal released the film on DVD and Blu-ray on 27 February 2013.

== Plot ==
A group of explorers from the British Cryptozoological Society (and two television cameramen) goes on an expedition into the Congo in search of a cryptid—the so-called Mokele-mbembe—which is believed to be a Plesiosaur called Elasmosaurus.

The explorers' leader, Jonathan, discovers during the helicopter flight, that his son Luke sneaked into the chopper as a stowaway. Shortly after that, a flock of large flying reptiles (pterosaurs) called Pteranodons appears next to the helicopter, causing the helicopter to crash. Everyone but the pilot escape just before the chopper explodes. Now lost, they discover that the satellite phone they had with them was broken during the crash, Amara, their local guide, suggests to go to the village they saw while in the helicopter. Upon arriving, the group discovers the village destroyed and the villagers dead. Jonathan chooses a hut to stay in for the night while his son installs a night vision camera outside the hut.

At night, everyone is wakened by a swarm of bat-like reptiles (Jeholopterus) outside. They try to flee the village because it's infested with the animals. Liz, their medic, is attacked and killed while the rest escape in a pair of wooden boats. After the boats get wrecked by an unseen force they arrive on a small island and decide to camp out for the night. As they talk around the fire they encounter a small unknown ornithopod with a frill around its neck (Possibly being a clear homage or reference to the ruff that the Dilophosaurus from Jurassic Park had on its neck) Being identified by Jonathan as a Lesothosaurus specimen. It particularly takes a liking to Luke. Luke names it "Crypto" after the term cryptozoology for short and decides to attach one of his cameras onto Crypto's neck to see where he would go. The broadcast cuts out as the dinosaurs swim into a cave.

When the broadcast returns, Luke and Charlie see that Crypto went straight to some kind of underground gateway, where the camera is dropped. When they try to steer through a whitewater, Luke's and Charlie's boat gets separated. The rest of the explorers rejoin them in a river canyon, where they encounter a magnificent Elasmosaurus. As they view the beast a vicious Pliosaur (Liopleurodon or Pliosaurus) suddenly emerges and attacks the group. The Elasmosaurus flees as well. Believing that the rest of the group died, Charlie and Luke continue to search for the place where the dinosaurs came from. When Charlie learns that Luke has fixed the satellite phone, he pushes Luke down into the gateway to kill him.

On the other side of the underground passageway, Luke speaks into the camera, trying to reach the other survivors via the monitor to no avail. Meanwhile, Amara leaves the other survivors, taking one of the boats. Jonathan and Pete continue the search for Luke and Charlie. In the meantime, Luke meets Crypto and follows him deeper into the jungle, where he is attacked by the bat-like creatures. He is rescued by Pete, who chases the creatures into the jungle, when he is suddenly encircled by them and presumably killed. Charlie is seen, speaking to the camera, when he is interrupted and forced to hide by Jonathan and Luke, continuing through the jungle. They follow a steep cliffway, when they are hit by a rockfall caused by Charlie. Luke tries to help his father who is holding onto a rock, but his father ends up falling down the cliff.

Luke hides in the dense jungle, evading Charlie who is chasing him, when he meets Crypto who leads him to the place where he dropped his camera earlier, when suddenly Charlie emerges in front of him, intending to kill him. Crypto spits fluid into Luke's face, when two adult giant theropods with frills (presumably Crypto's parents) appear. Sniffing at Luke and smelling the fluid, they leave him alone, most likely because he smells like one of their offspring, and they brutally kill Charlie.

Luke proceeds into the jungle and stops at a high cliff, filming himself and Crypto, he says that the satellite phone has been crushed again and that he has to destroy the cameras to use the parts, he waves the camera over the view from the cliff, showing a big valley full of dinosaurs from afar which seems there is a herd of large sauropods, possibly Apatosaurus, just like what it seems to be a Dilophosaurus-like theropod stalking the herd. In the next scene he is seen throwing the backpack down a waterfall into a river. Luke's fate is unknown.

The floating backpack is found by men in a boat, who find video hard drives and tapes labelled "the Dinosaur Project" inside. In a blurry video, Luke says "I think it works" at his father, who survived his fall.

== Cast ==
- Richard Dillane as Jonathan Marchant
- Peter Brooke as Charlie Rutherford
- Matthew Kane as Luke Marchant
- Natasha Loring as Liz Draper
- Stephen Jennings as Dave Moore
- Andre Weideman as Pete Van Aarde
- Abena Ayivor as Amara
- Sivu Nobogonza as Etienne

== Production ==
=== Filming ===
The Dinosaur Project was filmed in South Africa.

== Release ==
=== Theatrical release ===
The film was released in cinemas in the UK on 10 August 2012. It was scheduled for release in cinemas worldwide through 2012–13, starting with South-East Asia on 23 August 2012.

=== Home media ===
The film was released on DVD and Blu-ray on 27 February 2013 by StudioCanal.

== Reception ==
=== Critical reception ===
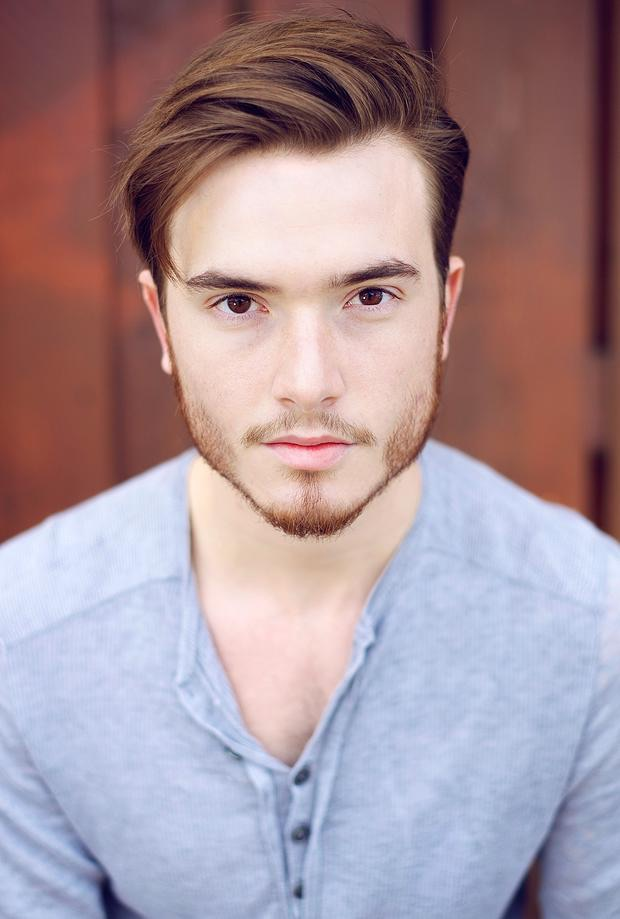
Richard Dillane and Matthew Kane were praised by critics for their performances.

On the review aggregator website Rotten Tomatoes, the film has an approval rating of 29% based on 14 critic reviews, with an average rating of 4.30/10.

Philip French of The Guardian wrote, "The CGI monsters are surprisingly convincing and children will identify with the intrepid 15-year-old lad who stows away on his dad's helicopter and turns up trumps by using his computer wizardry." Nigel Andrews of The Financial Times awarded the film 4 out of 5 stars and called it "rip-roaring fun...Feature debutant Sid Bennett's motion-capture movie also does emotion capture. You will jump, gasp, grimace, just like the characters. The creatures are often very creepy. The Cloverfield-style dependency on "found footage" means everyone on screen must have a camera, but even that is carried off with dash and nonchalance." Digital Spy awarded the movie 3 stars out of 5 and labelled it "Decent found-footage caper...The Dinosaur Project is good and undemanding fun. There are enough sharp claws to overcome the flaws and ensure this is never a dino-bore...

Total Film awarded it three stars out of five and said "Though it's desperate to be the next Jurassic Park, there's little Spielbergian bite to this low-budget Brit flick. Instead we get wobbly cameras and equally wobbly acting from a cast of unknowns as a group of explorers hunt dinos in the Congo....Its money shots generally impress, and the breakneck pace bounds over a multitude of sins – including Park's deadly dilophosaurus getting a makeover as a cute little critter that'll have the nippers cooing." IGN awarded the film 4 out of ten and said "Writer-director Sid Bennett does manage to eek moments of tension out of the premise, and the vast African vistas glimpsed throughout are a joy to behold...a found footage flick that disappoints at just about every turn, and makes you wish the tapes had remained lost." The Independent's Anthony Quinn awarded the film two stars out of five, writing, "The script stinks like dino-poo... but for all the silliness you may find yourself entertained." SFX awarded the film two and a half out of five stars and said "...has just enough charm to be worth a look – particularly if you have kids who like watching giant reptiles eating people...A few unexpected twists that mark it out as interesting (the running order of the deaths isn't quite what you'd expect, for example) and the dinos are a cut above most films of this nature – particularly one little cutie who's basically dino-Lassie. Admirably, the vast majority of the action is shot on location, with some white-water rafting to spice up the scenes with no reptiles in. Despite the plus points, though, it's still a cheesy, childish adventure which tries very hard not to be the TV movie it actually is." Empire's Simon Crook gave the film two stars out of five, calling it "More Terra Nova meets Sanctum 3D than Jurassic Park meets Cloverfield."

=== Retrospective ===
In the years following its release, The Dinosaur Project has featured in a number of recommended genre and horror film lists, reappraising the movie's innovative approach and affording cult status to the work. Bloody Disgusting's "65 Million Years Ago: 6 Underrated Dinosaur Movies to Watch Ahead of the Adam Driver Movie." recognises the film's ambition on a low budget and praises its unique found footage treatment: "...it’s pretty hard to depict a realistic dinosaur onscreen without a Spielbergian budget. That being said, clever filmmakers can always find ways to work around sub-par effects, which is precisely the case with Sid Bennett’s The Dinosaur Project."

The Dinosaur Project also makes the recommendations list in "5 Deep Cut Horror Movies to Seek Out in March 2023," also on the horror genre website Bloody Disgusting.

The August 2025 article "9 Best Movies Like ‘Primitive War’ To Watch If You Loved The Film" featuring on the multimedia database "Cinemablind.com" recommends The Dinosaur Project as a film to watch for fans of the movie Primitive War

The February 2025 article "Forget ‘Jurassic World Rebirth' — This Found Footage Dinosaur Horror From 2012 Has the Dino Death You Crave" on Collider.com goes further, suggesting that the relationship between Luke and the cute Lesothosaurus dinosaur Crypto in The Dinosaur Project may have influenced the subsequent Jurassic World movies, stating "Luke and Crypto pull on the heartstrings, with Crypto functioning as the film’s mascot, an endearing little creature to coo over. It's a smart move on the film's part, one the Jurassic World movies might have been inspired by...while watching Crypto and Luke bond in The Dinosaur Project, one can't help but feel reminded of Blue and Chris Pratt's Owen."

=== Box office ===
The Dinosaur Project grossed $2,412,576 from cinemas worldwide. On its international cinema release, debuting in South East Asia, the movie was a commercial hit, entering the Malaysian box office charts in second position behind The Expendables 2. On its release in Thailand, The Dinosaur Project attained third spot.

== Music ==
Richard Blair-Oliphant scored the music for the film and on its soundtrack.

== See also ==
- List of films featuring dinosaurs
