= List of animated feature films of 2018 =

This is a list of animated feature films that were released in 2018.

== List ==
Animated feature films first released in 2018
Title	Country	Director	Production company	Animation technique	Notes	Release date	Duration
3 Bahadur: Rise of the Warriors	Pakistan	Sharmeen Obaid-Chinoy	Waadi Animations	Computer		December 14, 2018	94 minutes
Alibaba and the Three Golden Hair 阿里巴巴三根金发 (Ali baba sangen jin fa)	China	Jiang Yefeng		Computer		December 30, 2018	85 minutes
Allahyar and the Legend of Markhor	Pakistan	Uzair Zaheer Khan	3rd World Studio	Computer		February 2, 2018	90 minutes
Anemone – Eureka Seven: Hi-Evolution 2	Japan	Tomoki Kyoda	Bones	Traditional		November 10, 2018 (Part 2)	90 minutes (Part 2)
Another Day of Life	Poland; Spain; Germany; Belgium; Hungary	Raúl de la Fuente; Damian Nenow	Kanaki Films; Platige Image; Puppetworks Animation Studio	Computer		May 11, 2018 (Cannes Film Festival)	85 minutes
Anpanman: Shine! Kulun And The Stars Of Life それいけ!アンパンマン かがやけ!クルンといのちの星	Japan	Hiroyuki Yano	Anpanman Production Committee; TMS Entertainment	Traditional		June 30, 2018	62 minutes
Asterix: The Secret of the Magic Potion; Asterix: The Secret Of The Magic Potion	France	Alexandre Astier, Louis Clichy	SND, Mikros Image	Computer		December 5, 2018	87 minutes
Attack on Titan: The Roar of Awakening	Japan	Tetsurō Araki, Masashi Koizuka	Wit Studio	Traditional		January 13, 2018	120 minutes
Bad Boss 나쁜 상사	South Korea	Unknown	CJ ENM	Traditional		August 7, 2018	103 minutes
Bamse and the Thunderbell; Bamse och dunderklockan	Sweden	Christian Ryltenius; Maria Blom	SF Studios	Traditional		December 21, 2018	65 minutes
Batman: Gotham by Gaslight	United States	Sam Liu	Warner Bros. Animation; DC Entertainment	Traditional		January 12, 2018 (Newseum); January 23, 2018 (Digital Download); February 6, 2018 (Blu-ray)	78 minutes
Batman Ninja	United States; Japan	Junpei Mizusaki	Warner Bros. Animation; Kamikaze Douga	Traditional / Computer		April 24, 2018 (United States); June 15, 2018 (Japan)	85 minutes
Big World! Big Adventures! The Movie	United States	David Stoten	HIT Entertainment; Mattel Creations	Computer		July 7, 2018 (London); July 20, 2018 (United Kingdom & Ireland); September 7, 2018 (United States)	85 minutes
Black is Beltza	Spain	Fermín Muguruza	Black is Beltza AIE, Talka Records, Euskal Irrati Telebista, Setmàgic Audiovisual	Traditional		October 5, 2018	88 minutes
Boonie Bears: The Big Shrink	China	Liang Ding		Computer		February 16, 2018	90 minutes
The Boxcar Children: Surprise Island	United States	Anna Chi; Mark A.Z. Dippé; Wonjae Lee	Blueberry Pictures, Legacy Classics Family Entertainment	Computer		May 8, 2018	81 minutes
Bumblebee	United States; China	Travis Knight	Paramount Pictures; Allspark Pictures; Bay Films; Di Bonaventura Pictures; Tencent Pictures	Computer / Live action		December 21, 2018	114 minutes
Bungo Stray Dogs: Dead Apple	Japan	Takuya Igarashi	Bones	Traditional		March 3, 2018	90 minutes
Buñuel in the Labyrinth of the Turtles; Buñuel en el Laberinto de las Tortugas	Spain; Netherlands	Salvador Simó	Sygnatia, Submarine	Traditional		October 20, 2018 (Animation Is Film Festival); April 26, 2019 (Spain)	77 minutes
Capt'n Sharky; Käpt'n Sharky	Germany	Jan Stoltz; Hubert Weiland	Caligari Film; Universum Film	Computer		August 30, 2018	73 minutes
Captain Morten and the Spider Queen; Kapten Morten Lollide Laeval	Estonia; Ireland; United Kingdom; Belgium	Kaspar Jancis	Nukufilm, Telegael, Calon, Grid Animation	Stop Motion		June 5, 2018 (Animafest Zagreb); March 21, 2019 (Estonia)	79 minutes
Cats and Peachtopia	China	Gary Wang	Light Chaser Animation Studios	Computer		April 5, 2018	105 minutes
Cattle Hill; KuToppen	Norway	Lise I. Osvoll	Qvisten Animation; The Lipp; Vigmostad & Bjørke	Computer		October 19, 2018	66 minutes
Charming	United States; Canada	Ross Venokur	Vanguard Animation; 3QU Media; WV Enterprises	Computer		April 20, 2018 (Spain); June 24, 2019 (United States)	85 minutes
Checkered Ninja; Ternet Ninja	Denmark	Thorbjørn Christoffersen; Anders Matthesen	A. Film; Pop Up Production; Sudoku ApS	Computer		December 25, 2018	81 minutes
Chris the Swiss	Switzerland; Germany; Croatia; Finland	Anja Kofmel	Dschoint Ventschr; Ma.Ja.De; Nukleus film	Traditional		May 13, 2018 (Cannes)	90 minutes
Christopher Robin	United States	Marc Forster	Walt Disney Pictures; 2Dux² Productions	Computer / Live action		July 30, 2018 (Burbank); August 3, 2018	104 minutes
Chuck Steel: Night of the Trampires	United Kingdom	Michael Mort	Animortal Studio	Stop Motion		June 12, 2018 (Annecy International Animation Film Festival, France)	89 minutes
Cinderella and the Secret Prince	United States	Lynne Southerland	Gold Valley Films	Computer		2018	90 minutes
Coconut the Little Dragon: Into the Jungle; Der kleine Drache Kokosnuss – Auf in den Dschungel!	Germany	Anthony Power	Caligari Film	Computer		December 27, 2018	80 minutes
Code Geass Lelouch of the Resurrection the Movie: Imperial Path	Japan	Gorō Taniguchi	Sunrise	Traditional		May 26, 2018	
Code Geass Lelouch of the Resurrection the Movie: Rebellion Path	Japan	Gorō Taniguchi	Sunrise	Traditional		February 10, 2018	
Constantine City of Demons: The Movie	United States	Doug Murphy	Warner Bros. Animation; DC Entertainment	Traditional		October 4, 2018 (New York City, New York); October 9, 2018 (DVD and Blu-ray)	90 minutes
Crayon Shin-chan: Burst Serving! Kung Fu Boys ~Ramen Rebellion~	Japan	Wataru Takahashi	Toho	Traditional		April 13, 2018	104 minutes
Dajjal: The Slayer and His Follower	Pakistan	Rana Abrar	WBJ Media	Computer		December 2018	100 minutes
DC Super Hero Girls: Legends of Atlantis	United States	Cecilia Aranovich; Ian Hamilton	Warner Bros. Animation; DC Entertainment	Traditional		July 22, 2018 (San Diego Comic-Con); October 2, 2018 (Digital and DVD)	72 minutes
The Death of Superman	United States	Jake Castorena; Sam Liu	Warner Bros. Animation; DC Entertainment	Traditional		July 20, 2018 (San Diego Comic-Con); July 24, 2018 (Digital)	81 minutes
Detective Conan: Zero the Enforcer	Japan	Tachikawa Yuzuru	Toho Company, Ltd.	Traditional		April 13, 2018	110 minutes
Digimon Adventure tri. Future	Japan	Keitaro Motonaga	Toei Animation	Traditional		May 5, 2018	97 minutes (Part 6)
Dilili in Paris; Dilili à Paris	France; Belgium; Germany	Michel Ocelot	Nord-Ouest FilmsStudio O Arte France Cinéma; Mars Films; Wild Bunch; Artémis Productions; Senator Film Produktion; Mac Guff	Computer / Traditional		June 11, 2018 (Annecy Festival); October 10, 2018 (France); October 24, 2018 (Belgium); May 1, 2019 (Internationales Trickfilm-Festival Stuttgart)	95 minutes
The Donkey King	Pakistan	Aziz Jindani	Talisman Studios	Computer		October 13, 2018	105 minutes
Doraemon the Movie: Nobita's Treasure Island	Japan	Kazuaki Imai	Toho	Traditional		March 3, 2018	108 minutes
Dr. Seuss' The Grinch	United States	Scott Mosier; Yarrow Cheney	Illumination	Computer		October 22, 2018 (Regency Village Theater); November 9, 2018	85 minutes
Dragon Ball Super: Broly	Japan	Tatsuya Nagamine	Toei Animation	Traditional		December 14, 2018	100 minutes
Duck Duck Goose	United States; China	Chris Jenkins	Netflix; GFM Animation; Wanda Pictures; Original Force Animation; Jiangsu Yuandongli Computer Animation Co., Ltd	Computer		March 9, 2018 (China); July 20, 2018 (United States)	91 minutes
Early Man	United Kingdom	Nick Park	Aardman Animations; British Film Institute	Stop-motion		January 20, 2018 (BFI Southbank); January 26, 2018	87 minutes
Eiga Shimajirō: Mahou no Shima no dai Boken	Japan	Hiroshi Kawamata; Takashima Hiro		Traditional		2018	52 minutes
Elliot the Littlest Reindeer	Canada	Jennifer Westcott	Awesometown Entertainment; Double Dutch International; Elgin Road Productions	Computer		October 19, 2018 (Turkey); December 4, 2018	
Enchanted Princess; Чудо-Юдо	Russia	Artyom Lukichev	Karo Premiere	Traditional		January 1, 2018	75 minutes
Foodiverse; Chihuo Yuzhou	China	Liaoyu Chen; Paulette Victor-Lifton	Odin's Eye Entertainment	Computer		June 16, 2018	89 minutes
Funan	France; Belgium; Luxembourg; Cambodia	Denis Do	Les Films d'Ici, Lunanime, Bac Films, Web Spider Production, Ithinkasia	Traditional		June 11, 2018 (Annecy International Animation Film Festival); March 6, 2019 (France); April 24, 2019 (Belgium)	84 minutes
Gekijōban Haikara-san ga Tōru Kōhen – Tokyo Dai Roman	Japan	Kazuhiro Furuhashi, Toshiaki Kidokoro	Nippon Animation	Traditional		October 19, 2018	105 minutes
Girls und Panzer: Dai 63 Kai Sensha-dou Zenkoku Koukousei Taikai Soushuuhen	Japan	Tsutomu Mizushima	Actas	Traditional		November 11, 2017	122 minutes
Godzilla: City on the Edge of Battle	Japan	Hiroyuki Seshita; Kōbun Shizuno	Polygon Pictures	Traditional		May 18, 2018	100 minutes
Goosebumps 2: Haunted Halloween	United States	Ari Sandel	Sony Pictures Animation; Original Film; Scholastic Entertainment; Silvertongue Film	Computer / Live action		October 8, 2018 (Culver City); October 12, 2018	90 minutes
Hanuman vs Mahiravana	India	Ezhil Vendan	Green Gold Animations	Computer		July 6, 2018	96 minutes
Happy Little Submarine: 20000 Leagues under the Sea	China	Yu Shen	Shenzhen GDC	Traditional		June 1, 2018	75 minutes
The Haunted House: The Secret of the Cave 신비아파트: 금빛 도깨비와 비밀의 동굴	South Korea	Kim Byung-gab	CJ ENM; Studio BAZOOKA	Traditional		July 25, 2018	68 minutes
Henchmen	Canada	Adam Wood	Bron Studios	Computer		December 7, 2018	89 minutes
Here Comes the Grump	Mexico; United Kingdom	Andrés Couturier	Ánima Estudios; GFM Animation; Prime Focus World	Computer		March 1, 2018 (Italy); July 26, 2018 (Mexico)	97 minutes
Hoffmaniada	Russia	Stanislav Sokolov	Soyuzmultfilm	Stop-motion		February 18, 2018 (Berlin International Film Festival); June 11, 2018 (AIAFF); October 11, 2018 (Russia)	75 minutes
Hoppi Land; Egy év Hoppifalván	Hungary	Ferenc Rofusz	The Hoppies	Flash	TV movie	March 17, 2018 (M2 TV premiere)	71 minutes
Hotel Transylvania 3: Summer Vacation	United States	Genndy Tartakovsky	Sony Pictures Animation	Computer		June 13, 2018 (AIAFF); July 13, 2018	97 minutes
Howard Lovecraft and the Kingdom of Madness	Canada	Sean Patrick O'Reilly	Arcana Studio	Computer		December 4, 2018	75 minutes
I Want to Eat Your Pancreas; Kimi no Suizō o Tabetai	Japan	Shinichiro Ushijima	Studio VOLN	Traditional		September 1, 2018	108 minutes
Incredibles 2	United States	Brad Bird	Pixar Animation Studios	Computer		June 5, 2018 (Los Angeles); June 15, 2018	118 minutes
Infini-T Force the Movie and Infinimals Forces	Japan	Jun Matsumoto	Tatsunoko Production; Digital Frontier	Computer		February 24, 2018	90 minutes
Isle of Dogs	United States; Japan; Germany; United Kingdom	Wes Anderson	20th Century Fox Animation; Indian Paintbrush; American Empirical Pictures; Studio Babelsberg; Scott Rudin Productions; 3 Mills Studios	Stop-motion		February 15, 2018 (Berlin); March 23, 2018 (United States); May 10, 2018 (Germany)	101 minutes
K: Seven Stories	Japan	Shingo Suzuki	GoHands	Traditional		July 7, 2018; August 4, 2018; September 1, 2018; October 6, 2018; November 3, 2018; December 1, 2018	59–66 minutes
Kase-san and Morning Glories	Japan	Takuya Satō	Zexcs	Traditional		June 9, 2018	58 minutes
Kikoriki: Deja Vu; Смешарики. Дежавю	Russia	Denis Chernov	Petersburg Animation Studio	Computer		April 26, 2018	85 minutes
King Şakir: Oyun Zamani	Turkey	Haluk Can Dizdaroglu, Berk Tokay	Grafi2000; BKM	Computer		May 11, 2018	74 minutes
The Last Fiction	Iran	Ashkan Rahgozar	Hoorakhsh studio	Traditional		June 12, 2018 (Annecy)	100 minutes
The Legend of Muay Thai: 9 Satra	Thailand	Pongsa Kornsri, Nat Yodsawattananon, Gun Phansuwan	M Pictures	Computer		January 11, 2018; December 25, 2019 (Netflix)	102 minutes
Lego DC Comics Super Heroes: Aquaman – Rage of Atlantis	United States	Matt Peters	Warner Bros. Animation, DC Entertainment, The Lego Group	Computer		July 22, 2018 (San Diego Comic-Con); July 31, 2018 (Digital, DVD and Blu-ray)	77 minutes
Lego DC Comics Super Heroes: The Flash	United States	Ethan Spaulding	Warner Bros. Animation, DC Entertainment, The Lego Group	Computer		February 13, 2018 (Digital); March 13, 2018 (DVD and Blu-ray)	78 minutes
Lego DC Super Hero Girls: Super-Villain High	United States	Elsa Garagarza	Warner Bros. Animation, DC Entertainment, The Lego Group	Computer		May 1, 2018 (Digital); May 15, 2018 (DVD)	78 minutes
Leo Da Vinci: Mission Mona Lisa	Italy; Poland	Sergio Manfio	Gruppo Alcuni	Computer		January 11, 2018	85 minutes
La Leyenda del Charro Negro	Mexico	Alberto Rodriguez	Ánima Estudios	Flash		January 19, 2018	85 minutes
Liz and the Blue Bird; Rizu to Aoi tori	Japan	Naoko Yamada	Kyoto Animation	Traditional		April 21, 2018	90 minutes
Louis & Luca – Mission to the Moon; Solan og Ludvig – Månelyst i Flåklypa	Norway	Rasmus A. Sivertsen	Maipo Film, Qvisten Animation	Stop motion		September 21, 2018	80 minutes
Love, Chunibyo & Other Delusions! Take on Me	Japan	Tatsuya Ishihara	Kyoto Animation	Traditional		January 6, 2018	90 minutes
Luis and the Aliens; Luis und die Aliens	Germany; Luxembourg; Denmark	Christoph Lauenstein; Wolfgang Lauenstein	Ulysses FilmsFabrique D'Images; A-Film APS	Computer		March 22, 2018 (Luxembourg City Film Festival); May 24, 2018 (Germany); August 17, 2018 (United States); August 24, 2018 (United Kingdom)	86 minutes
Macross Delta the Movie: Passionate Walkūre	Japan	Kenji Yasuda	Studio Nue; Satelight	Traditional		February 9, 2018	119 minutes
Magic Birds: The Movie	Greece	Nikos Vergitsis	Art Toons	Traditional		January 15, 2018	
Magic Mirror 2	China	Chengfeng Zheng; Yang Li	Huaxia Film Distribution Co., Ltd; Beijing Yingshikong Media Co., Ltd	Traditional		June 1, 2018	
Magical Girl Lyrical Nanoha Detonation	Japan	Takayuki Hamana	Seven Arcs	Traditional		October 19, 2018	111 minutes
Maquia: When the Promised Flower Blooms; Sayonara no Asa ni Yakusoku no Hana o Kazarō	Japan	Mari Okada	P.A. Works	Computer / Traditional		February 24, 2018	115 minutes
Marcianos vs. Mexicanos	Mexico	Gabriel Riva Palacio Alatriste; Rodolfo Riva Palacio Alatriste	Huevocartoon Producciones; Televisa; Cinergistic Films	Traditional		March 9, 2018	87 minutes
Marnie's World; Marnies Welt; Spy Cat	France; Germany; Belgium	Christoph Lauenstein; Wolfgang Lauenstein	Scopas Medien; Grid Animation; Philm CGI; SevenPictures Film GmbH; Schubert International Filmproduktions; UFA Fiction; Lauenstein & Lauenstein; Scope Pictures	Computer		June 13, 2018 (Annecy)	84 minutes
Marvel Rising: Secret Warriors	United States	Alfred Gimeno	Marvel Animation	Traditional		September 30, 2018	80 minutes
Mary Poppins Returns	United States	Rob Marshall	Walt Disney Pictures	Traditional / Live action		November 29, 2018 (Dolby Theatre); December 19, 2018 (United States)	131 minutes
Maya the Bee: The Honey Games	Germany; Australia	Noel Cleary; Sergio Delfino	Studio 100 Film; Buzz Studios; Fish Blowing Bubbles; Flying Bark Productions; Screen Australia	Computer		March 1, 2018 (Germany); May 1, 2018 (United States); July 26, 2018 (Australia)	85 minutes
Memoirs of a Man in Pajamas; Memorias de un hombre en pijama	Spain	Carlos Fernández de Vigo	Dream Team Concept, Ézaro Films, Hampa Studio	Traditional		April 14, 2018 (Málaga Film Festival); November 9, 2018 (Madrid); November 16, 2018 (Barcelona); January 4, 2019 (Spain)	74 minutes
Mirai; Mirai no Mirai	Japan	Mamoru Hosoda	Studio Chizu	Traditional		May 16, 2018 (Directors' Fortnight); July 20, 2018 (Japan)	98 minutes
Mission Kathmandu: The Adventures of Nelly and Simon; Nelly et Simon: Mission Yéti	Canada	Nancy Florence Savard, Pierre Greco	10th Ave. Productions	Computer		October 5, 2017 (FIFF); February 23, 2018 (Québec)	85 minutes
Modest Heroes ちいさな英雄-カニとタマゴと透明人間-	Japan	Hiromasa Yonebayashi, Yoshiyuki Momose, Akihiko Yamashita	Studio Ponoc	Traditional		August 24, 2018	53 minutes
Motel Rose 장미여관 (Jang-mi-yeo-gwan)	South Korea	Yeo Eun-a		Traditional		October 19, 2018	77 minutes
My Hero Academia: Two Heroes	Japan	Kenji Nagasaki	Bones	Traditional		July 5, 2018 (Los Angeles); August 3, 2018 (Japan)	97 minutes
Natsume's Book of Friends the Movie	Japan	Takahiro Omori, Hideaki Itō	Shuka	Traditional		September 29, 2018	104 minutes
Next Gen	Canada; United States	Kevin R. Adams, Joe Ksander	Netflix; Baozou Manhua; Alibaba Pictures; Tangent Animation	Computer		September 7, 2018	105 minutes
Non Non Biyori Vacation	Japan	Shin'ya Kawatsura	Silver Link	Traditional		August 25, 2018	71 minutes
Norm of the North: Keys to the Kingdom	United States	Tim Maltby, Richard Finn (co-director)	Assemblage Entertainment; Discreet Arts Productions; Lionsgate; Splash Entertainment	Computer		August 9, 2018	91 minutes
North of Blue	United States	Joanna Priestley	Joanna Priestley Motion Pictures	Traditional		June 11, 2018 (Annecy)	60 minutes
Okko's Inn; Waka Okami wa Shogakusei!	Japan	Kitarô Kôsaka	Madhouse Inc.	Traditional		June 11, 2018	94 minutes
Pachamama	France; Luxembourg; Canada	Juan Antin	Netflix; Folivari	Computer / Traditional		October 20, 2018 (Animation Is Film Festival); December 12, 2018	72 minutes
Peacemaker Kurogane	Japan	Hiroshi Takeuchi	White Fox	Traditional		June 2, 2018 (Part 1); November 17, 2018 (Part 2)	109 minutes (total)
Penguin Highway	Japan	Hiroyasu Ishida	Studio Colorido	Traditional		July 29, 2018 (Fantasia International Film Festival); August 17, 2018 (Japan)	118 minutes
Peter Rabbit	United States; United Kingdom; Australia	Will Gluck	Sony Pictures Animation	Computer / Live action		February 3, 2018 (The Grove); February 9, 2018 (United States); March 16, 2018 (United Kingdom); March 22, 2018 (Australia)	95 minutes
Ploey: You Never Fly Alone; Lói – Þú flýgur aldrei einn	Iceland	Árni Ásgeirsson	GunHill; Cyborn	Computer		February 2, 2018	82 minutes
Pocoyo and the League of Extraordinary Super Friends	Spain	Andy Yekes	Zinkia Entertainment	Computer		June 22, 2018	49 minutes
Pokémon the Movie: The Power of Us	Japan	Tetsuo Yajima	OLM; Wit Studio	Traditional		July 13, 2018	100 minutes
Pretty Cure Super Stars!	Japan	Yōko Ikeda	Toei Animation	Traditional		March 17, 2018	
The Princess and the Dragon; Принцесса и Дракон	Russia	Marina Nefedova	Licensing Brands; AA Studio	Computer		August 23, 2018	75 minutes
Racetime; La course des Tuques	Canada	Benoit Godbout, François Brisson	CarpeDiem Film	Computer		December 7, 2018	89 minutes
Ralph Breaks the Internet	United States	Rich Moore; Phil Johnston	Walt Disney Animation Studios	Computer		November 5, 2018 (El Capitan Theatre); November 21, 2018	112 minutes
Ready Player One	United States	Steven Spielberg	Warner Bros. Pictures	Computer / Live action		March 29, 2018	140 minutes
Ruben Brandt, Collector hu:Ruben Brandt, a gyűjtő	Hungary	Milorad Krstić	Sony Pictures Classics	Traditional / Computer		August 9, 2018 (Locarno Film Festival)	94 minutes
Sadko; Садко	Russia	Vitaly Mukhametzianov	InlayFilm; CTB Film Company	Computer		May 24, 2018	81 minutes
Samouni Road; La strada dei Samouni	Italy; France	Stefano Savona	Dugong Films; Picofilms; Alterego Productions; Rai Cinema; Arte France Cinéma	Computer / Traditional		May 10, 2018 (Cannes)	128 minutes
Scooby-Doo! & Batman: The Brave and the Bold	United States	Jake Castorena	Warner Bros. Animation; DC Entertainment; Hanna-Barbera Cartoons	Traditional		January 6, 2018 (TCL Chinese Theatre; January 9, 2018 DVD and digital)	75 minutes
Scooby-Doo! and the Gourmet Ghost	United States	Doug Murphy	Warner Bros. Animation; Hanna-Barbera Productions	Traditional	Direct-to-video	July 22, 2018 (San Diego Comic-Con); August 28, 2018 (Digital)	77 minutes
Seder-Masochism	United States	Nina Paley		Flash		June 11, 2018 (Annecy International Animated Film Festival)	78 minutes
The Seven Deadly Sins the Movie: Prisoners of the Sky	Japan	Noriyuki Abe, Yasuto Nishikata	A-1 Pictures	Traditional		August 18, 2018	99 minutes
Sgt. Stubby: An American Hero	United States	Richard Lanni	Fun Academy Media Group; Mikros Image	Computer		March 27, 2018 (Los Angeles); April 13, 2018 (United States and Canada)	84 minutes
Sherlock Gnomes	United Kingdom; United States	John Stevenson	Rocket Pictures; Paramount Animation	Computer		March 23, 2018 (United States); May 11, 2018 (United Kingdom)	86 minutes
Shimajiro the Movie: Adventures on Magic Island	Japan	Hiroshi Kawamata, Hiro Takashima	Benesse; Toho; Sony Music Direct	Computer		March 9, 2018	52 minutes
Smallfoot	United States	Karey Kirkpatrick	Warner Animation Group; Zaftig Films	Computer		September 28, 2018	96 minutes
The Snow Queen: Mirrorlands	Russia	Robert Lence, Aleksey Tsitsilin	Wizart Animation	Computer		December 21, 2018 (Poland, et al.); January 1, 2019	84 minutes
Spider-Man: Into the Spider-Verse	United States	Bob Persichetti; Peter Ramsey; Rodney Rothman	Sony Pictures Animation; Marvel Entertainment; Pascal Pictures; Arad Productions; Lord Miller Productions	Computer / Traditional		December 1, 2018 (Regency Village Theater); December 14, 2018	117 minutes
The Stolen Princess	Ukraine	Oleh Malamuzh	Animagrad Animation Studio; FILM.UA Group	Computer		March 7, 2018	90 minutes
Strike	United Kingdom	Trevor Hardy	Gigglefish	Stop Motion		December 16, 2018 (Carrefour du Cinéma d'Animation); March 16, 2019 (United Kingdom)	100 minutes
Suicide Squad: Hell to Pay	United States	Sam Liu	Warner Bros. Animation; DC Entertainment	Traditional		March 27, 2018 (Digital download) and (Blu-ray and DVD)	86 minutes
The Swan Princess: A Royal Myztery	United States	Richard Rich	Sony Pictures Home Entertainment; Crest Animation Productions	Computer		March 27, 2018	79 minutes
Tabaluga	Germany	Sven Unterwaldt	Awesometown Entertainment, Deutsche Columbia, Tempest Film, Trixter	Computer		December 6, 2018	90 minutes
Teen Titans Go! To the Movies	United States	Aaron Horvath, Peter Rida Michail	Warner Bros. Animation; DC Entertainment	Flash		July 22, 2018 (BFI Southbank); July 27, 2018	84 minutes 105 minutes (Director's cut)
The Testament of Sister New Devil Departures	Japan	Hisashi Saito	Production IMS	Traditional		March 28, 2018	60 minutes
The Three Heroes. The Heiress to the Throne; Три богатыря и наследница престола	Russia	Konstantin Bronzit	Melnitsa Animation Studio	Traditional		December 27, 2018	81 minutes
Tito and the Birds; Tito e os Pássaros	Brazil	Gustavo Steinberg, Gabriel Bitar, André Catoto	Bits Producoes	Traditional		June 11, 2018 (Annecy International Animation Film Festival); February 14, 2019 (Brazil)	73 minutes
The Tower; Wardi	France; Norway; Sweden	Mats Grorud	Les Contes modernes, Cinenic Film, Tenk.tv	Stop-motion / Flash		June 11, 2018 (Annecy); November 30, 2018 (Norway)	74 minutes
Troll: The Tale of a Tail	Canada; Norway	Kevin Munroe	Sagatoon	Computer		December 25, 2018	91 minutes
Two Tails; Два Хвоста	Russia	Victor Azeev	Licensing Brands	Computer		May 31, 2018	77 minutes
Underdog 언더독 (Eon-deo-dok)	South Korea	Lee Chun-baek, Oh Sung-yoon	Odolttogi	Traditional		July 12, 2018 (BIFAN); January 16, 2019 (South Korea)	102 minutes
Up and Away; Hodja fra Pjort	Denmark	Karsten Kiilerich	A film	Computer		February 8, 2018	81 minutes
Ville Neuve	Canada	Félix Dufour-Laperrière	Productions l'Unite Centrale	Traditional		September 7, 2018 (Venice)	76 minutes
Vitello	Denmark	Dorte Bengtson	Ja Film	Traditional		February 1, 2018	72 minutes
Wheely: Fast & Hilarious	Malaysia	Yusry Abd Halim (as Yusry Abdul Halim), Carl Mendez	Kartun Studios Malaysia	Computer		August 16, 2018	90 minutes
White Fang; Croc Blanc	France; Luxembourg; United States	Alexandre Espigares	Superprod	Computer		January 21, 2018 (Sundance); March 28, 2018 (France); July 8, 2018 (United States)	85 minutes
Willy and the Guardians of the Lake hu:Lengemesék 2 - Tél a nádtengeren	Hungary	Zsolt Pálfi	Cinemon Entertainment; Vertigo Média	Flash		December 6, 2018	70 minutes
The Wolf House; La Casa Lobo	Chile	Joaquín Cociña, Cristóbal León	Diluvio, Globo Rojo	Stop Motion		February 22, 2018 (Berlin)	75 minutes
Zokuowarimonogatari	Japan	TBA	Shaft	Traditional		November 10, 2018	148 minutes
ZOOks	Belgium	Dimitri Leue, Kristoff Leue	The Fridge, Potemkino, Sancta Media	Computer		February 4, 2018 (JEF Festival); February 10, 2018 (Anima); July 14, 2018 (BiFan - Bucheon International Fantastic Film Festival)	90 minutes

== Highest-grossing animated films ==
The following is a list of the 10 highest-grossing animated feature films first released in 2018.

Rank	Title	Distributor	Worldwide gross	Ref
1	Incredibles 2	Walt Disney Studios Motion Pictures	$1,242,805,359	
2	Ralph Breaks the Internet	Walt Disney Studios Motion Pictures	$529,161,417	
3	Hotel Transylvania 3: Summer Vacation	Sony Pictures Releasing	$528,583,774	
4	The Grinch	Universal Pictures	$511,565,348	
5	Spider-Man: Into the Spider-Verse	Sony Pictures Releasing	$375,460,612	
6	Smallfoot	Warner Bros.	$214,140,103	
7	Dragon Ball Super: Broly	20th Century Fox	$114,102,821	
8	Detective Conan: Zero the Enforcer	Toho	$108,105,223	
9	Boonie Bears: The Big Shrink	Le Vision Pictures	$96,756,214	
10	Sherlock Gnomes	Paramount Pictures	$90,345,086	

Incredibles 2 became the seventh animated film after Toy Story 3 (2010), Frozen (2013), Minions (2015), Zootopia, Finding Dory (both in 2016), and Despicable Me 3 (2017) to gross over $1 billion, and is currently the fourth-highest-grossing animated film of all time and the 19th-highest-grossing film of all time.

== See also ==
- List of animated television series of 2018
