= List of highest-grossing openings for animated films =

The following is a list of the highest-grossing opening weekends for animated films. The list is dominated by recent films due to steadily increasing marketing budgets, and modern films opening on more screens. Another contributing factor is inflation not being taken into account.

== Biggest worldwide openings for an animated film since 2002 ==
This list charts animated films that had openings in excess of $100 million worldwide. Since animated films do not open on Fridays in many markets, the 'opening' is taken to be the gross between the first day of release and the first Sunday. Figures prior to 2002 are not available.

Figures are given in United States dollars (USD). 2013 is the most represented year, with four films. The Ice Age and Despicable Me franchises are the most represented franchises. Disney is the most represented studio with over 10 films.

This list does not take into account country-by-country variations in release dates. Therefore, in some cases opening weekend grosses from many, or even most countries may not be included.

| Rank | Film | Worldwide opening ($ million) | Year | Ref |
|---|---|---|---|---|
| 1 | Zootopia 2 | 560.3 | 2025 | |
| 2 | Ne Zha 2 | 431.3 | 2025 | |
| 3 | Moana 2 | 389.3 | 2024 | |
| 4 | The Super Mario Bros. Movie | 375.6 | 2023 | |
| 5 | The Super Mario Galaxy Movie | 372.5 | 2026 | |
| 6 | Frozen II | 358.5 | 2019 | |
| 7 | Toy Story 5 | 312 | 2026 | |
| 8 | Inside Out 2 | 294.2 | 2024 | |
| 9 | The Lion King (2019) (Note: Disney, which produced The Lion King (2019), considered the film to be live-action despite most of the film (aside from its opening shot) being made with photorealistic computer animation. Others, such as the Hollywood Foreign Press Association (presenter of the Golden Globe Awards), deemed it to be animated based on specified criteria.) | 245.9 | 2019 | |
| 10 | Toy Story 4 | 244.5 | 2019 | |
| 11 | Minions: The Rise of Gru | 241 | 2022 | |
| 12 | Incredibles 2 | 235.8 | 2018 | |
| 13 | Despicable Me 4 | 229.5 | 2024 | |
| 14 | Ice Age: Dawn of the Dinosaurs | 218.4 | 2009 | |
| 15 | Spider-Man: Across the Spider-Verse | 208.7 | 2023 | |
| 16 | Finding Dory | 185.7 | 2016 | |
| 17 | The Simpsons Movie | 170.9 | 2007 | |
| 18 | Minions & Monsters | 160 | 2026 | |
| 19 | Jiang Ziya: Legend of Deification | 151.7 | 2020 | |
| 20 | Despicable Me 2 | 147.4 | 2013 | |
| 21 | Toy Story 3 | 145.3 | 2010 | |
| 22 | Madagascar 3: Europe's Most Wanted | 137.6 | 2012 | |
| 23 | Monsters University | 136.9 | 2013 | |
| 24 | Shrek the Third | 136.8 | 2007 | |
| 25 | Shrek 2 | 131.1 | 2004 | |

== Timeline of biggest worldwide openings for an animated film since 2001 ==
At least eight animated films have held the record of highest-grossing animated film at different times. Pixar has held the record the most of any time with three films in 2001, 2018, and 2019.

| Film | Established | Record-setting opening ($ million) | Ref |
|---|---|---|---|
| Monsters, Inc. | 2001 | 84.8 | |
| The Simpsons Movie | 2007 | 170.9 | |
| Ice Age: Dawn of the Dinosaurs | 2009 | 218.4 | |
| Incredibles 2 | 2018 | 235.8 | |
| Toy Story 4 | June 2019 | 244.5 | |
| The Lion King (2019) | July 2019 | 245.9 | |
| Frozen II | November 2019 | 358.5 | |
| The Super Mario Bros. Movie | 2023 | 375.6 | |
| Moana 2 | 2024 | 389.3 | |
| Ne Zha 2 | January 2025 | 431.3 | |
| Zootopia 2 | November 2025 | 560.3 | |

== Biggest opening weekend in U.S. and Canada for an animated film ==
This list charts the top 50 highest-grossing opening weekends in the U.S. and Canada for an animated film.

Figures are given in United States dollars (USD). Ninety-eight percent of the films in the top 50 were released after 2000 with 2015 and 2016 being the most represented years, with six films each. Despicable Me is the most represented franchise, with 5 films.

DreamWorks Animation and Pixar are the most represented studios with over 15 films each on the list.

| Rank | Film | Gross ($ million) | Year | Ref |
|---|---|---|---|---|
| 1. | The Lion King (2019) | 191.8 | 2019 | |
| 2. | Incredibles 2 | 182.7 | 2018 | |
| 3 | Toy Story 5 | 159.7 | 2026 | |
| 4 | Inside Out 2 | 154.2 | 2024 | |
| 5 | The Super Mario Bros. Movie | 146.4 | 2023 | |
| 6 | Moana 2 | 139.8 | 2024 | |
| 7 | Finding Dory | 135.1 | 2016 | |
| 8 | The Super Mario Galaxy Movie | 131.7 | 2026 | |
| 9 | Frozen II | 130.3 | 2019 | |
| 10 | Shrek the Third | 121.6 | 2007 | |
| 11 | Toy Story 4 | 120.9 | 2019 | |
| 12 | Spider-Man: Across the Spider-Verse | 120.6 | 2023 | |
| 13 | Minions | 115.2 | 2015 | |
| 14 | Toy Story 3 | 110.3 | 2010 | |
| 15 | Shrek 2 | 108.0 | 2004 | |
| 16 | Minions: The Rise of Gru | 107 | 2022 | |
| 17 | The Secret Life of Pets | 104.3 | 2016 | |
| 18 | Zootopia 2 | 100.3 | 2025 | |
| 19 | Inside Out | 90.4 | 2015 | |
| 20 | Despicable Me 2 | 83.5 | 2013 | |
| 21 | Monsters University | 82.4 | 2013 | |
| 22 | Zootopia | 75.1 | 2016 | |
| 23 | Despicable Me 4 | 75 | 2024 | |
| 24 | The Simpsons Movie | 74 | 2007 | |
| 25 | Despicable Me 3 | 72.4 | 2017 | |
| 26 | Shrek Forever After | 70.8 | 2010 | |
| 27 | The Incredibles | 70.5 | 2004 | |
| 28 | Finding Nemo | 70.3 | 2003 | |
| 29 | The Lorax | 70.2 | 2012 | |
| 30 | The Lego Movie | 69.1 | 2014 | |
| 31 | Up | 68.1 | 2009 | |
| 32 | Ice Age: The Meltdown | 68 | 2006 | |
| 33 | The Grinch | 67.6 | 2018 | |
| 34 | Frozen | 67.4 | 2013 | |
| 35 | Brave | 66.3 | 2012 | |
| 36 | Cars 2 | 66.13 | 2011 | |
| 37 | Madagascar: Escape 2 Africa | 63.11 | 2008 | |
| 38 | WALL-E | 63.10 | 2008 | |
| 39 | Monsters, Inc. | 62.3 | 2001 | |
| 40 | Madagascar 3: Europe's Most Wanted | 60.3 | 2012 | |
| 41 | Kung Fu Panda | 60.2 | 2008 | |
| 42 | Cars | 60.1 | 2006 | |
| 43 | Monsters vs. Aliens | 59.3 | 2009 | |
| 44 | Kung Fu Panda 4 | 57.9 | 2024 | |
| 45 | Toy Story 2 | 57.4 | 1999 | |
| 46 | Moana | 56.6 | 2016 | |
| 47 | Despicable Me | 56.4 | 2010 | |
| 48 | Ralph Breaks the Internet | 56.2 | 2018 | |
| 49 | Big Hero 6 | 56.2 | 2014 | |
| 50 | The SpongeBob Movie: Sponge Out of Water | 55.4 | 2015 | |

== Opening weekend record holders in U.S. and Canada since 1982 ==
These are the films that, when first released, set the opening three-day weekend record after going into wide release.

At least 14 animated films have held the record of highest-grossing animated film at different times since 1982. Two of these were in the DreamWorks animations Shrek franchise. Disney and Pixar held the record five times each as of 2018.

| Film | Established | Record-setting opening ($ million) | Ref |
|---|---|---|---|
| The Secret of NIMH | July 1982 | 1.4 | |
| The Last Unicorn | November 1982 | 2.3 | |
| Snow White and the Seven Dwarfs | 1983 | 6.0 | |
| Snow White and the Seven Dwarfs | 1987 | 7.51 | |
| The Land Before Time | 1988 | 7.52 | |
| Aladdin | 1992 | 19.3 | |
| The Lion King | 1994 | 40.9 | |
| Toy Story 2 | 1999 | 57.4 | |
| Monsters, Inc. | 2001 | 62.6 | |
| Finding Nemo | 2003 | 70.3 | |
| Shrek 2 | 2004 | 108.0 | |
| Shrek the Third | 2007 | 121.6 | |
| Finding Dory | 2016 | 135.1 | |
| Incredibles 2 | 2018 | 182.7 | |
| The Lion King (2019) | 2019 | 191.8 | |

== Biggest opening week in U.S. and Canada for an animated film ==
This list charts animated films that had openings in excess of $70 million in their first week.

Figures are given in United States dollars (USD). 42.8% of the films in the top 35 were released after 2010, 2016 is the most represented year, with four films. Shrek, Madagascar, and Despicable Me are the most represented franchises with three films. All films in Cars, The Incredibles, Finding Nemo, Madagascar main film series, and Despicable Me franchises are on the list. Pixar is the most represented studio with over 10 films on the list.

| rank | film | gross ($) | year | ref |
|---|---|---|---|---|
| 1 | The Lion King (2019) | 275.2 | 2019 | |
| 2 | Incredibles 2 | 269.4 | 2018 | |
| 3 | Inside Out 2 | 255.2 | 2024 | |
| 4 | The Super Mario Bros. Movie | 240.2 | 2023 | |
| 5 | Moana 2 | 239.4 | 2024 | |
| 6 | Toy Story 5 | 227.2 | 2026 | |
| 7 | The Super Mario Galaxy Movie | 222.4 | 2026 | |
| 8 | Finding Dory | 213.3 | 2016 | |
| 9 | Frozen II | 202 | 2019 | |
| 10 | Toy Story 4 | 179 | 2019 | |
| 11 | Spider-Man: Across the Spider-Verse | 170 | 2023 | |
| 12 | Zootopia 2 | 169.9 | 2025 | |
| 13 | Toy Story 3 | 167.6 | 2010 | |
| 14 | Minions | 166.5 | 2015 | |
| 15 | Minions: The Rise of Gru | 164.5 | 2022 | |
| 16 | The Secret Life of Pets | 152.6 | 2016 | |
| 17 | Shrek the Third | 149.4 | 2007 | |
| 18 | Shrek 2 | 143.8 | 2004 | |
| 19 | Inside Out | 132.8 | 2015 | |
| 20 | Despicable Me 2 | 124.9 | 2013 | |
| 21 | Monsters University | 124.8 | 2013 | |
| 22 | The Simpsons Movie | 102.9 | 2007 | |
| 23 | Brave | 97.7 | 2012 | |
| 24 | Finding Nemo | 97.5 | 2003 | |
| 25 | WALL-E | 94.7 | 2008 | |
| 26 | Up | 93.1 | 2009 | |
| 27 | The Incredibles | 93 | 2004 | |
| 28 | Zootopia | 92.6 | 2016 | |
| 29 | Cars 2 | 90.9 | 2011 | |
| 30 | Shrek Forever After | 89.8 | 2010 | |
| 31 | The Grinch | 88.4 | 2018 | |
| 32 | Moana | 87.6 | 2016 | |
| 33 | Despicable Me | 85.6 | 2010 | |
| 34 | Madagascar 3: Europe's Most Wanted | 85 | 2012 | |
| 35 | Kung Fu Panda | 83.7 | 2008 | |
| 36 | Cars | 83.3 | 2006 | |
| 37 | The Lorax | 82.9 | 2012 | |
| 38 | Ice Age: The Meltdown | 81.9 | 2006 | |
| 39 | Madagascar: Escape 2 Africa | 81.8 | 2008 | |
| 40 | Ratatouille | 80.5 | 2007 | |
| 41 | Monsters, Inc. | 80.3 | 2001 | |
| 42 | Minions & Monsters | 77.2 | 2026 | |
| 43 | Frozen | 76.1 | 2013 | |
| 44 | Big Hero 6 | 75.6 | 2014 | |
| 45 | Cars 3 | 74.7 | 2017 | |
| 46 | Madagascar | 72.3 | 2005 | |
| 47 | Monsters vs. Aliens | 72.2 | 2009 | |
| 48 | Kung Fu Panda 2 | 70.3 | 2011 | |

== Biggest opening day in U.S. and Canada for an animated film ==
This list charts animated films that had openings in excess of $16 million on their first day of release in the U.S. and Canada. Figures are given in United States dollars (USD). 64% of the films in this list were released after 2010. 2018 is the most represented year on the list with 4 films.

All films in the main series Cars, Despicable Me, Monsters, Inc., Finding Nemo, and The Incredibles are present on this list and Despicable Me is the most represented franchise with 4 films. Pixar is the most represented studio with over 10 films on the list.

| rank | film | gross ($million) | year | Ref |
|---|---|---|---|---|
| 1 | The Lion King (2019) | 77.95 | 2019 | |
| 2 | Incredibles 2 | 71.3 | 2018 | |
| 3 | Toy Story 5 | 71.1 | 2026 | |
| 4 | Inside Out 2 | 63.5 | 2024 | |
| 5 | Moana 2 | 57.9 | 2024 | |
| 6 | Finding Dory | 54.77 | 2016 | |
| 7 | Spider-Man: Across the Spider-Verse | 51.8 | 2023 | |
| 8 | Minions: The Rise of Gru | 48.23 | 2022 | |
| 9 | Toy Story 4 | 47.42 | 2019 | |
| 10 | Minions | 46.07 | 2015 | |
| 11 | Frozen II | 42.23 | 2019 | |
| 12 | Toy Story 3 | 41.14 | 2010 | |
| 13 | The Secret Life of Pets | 38.5 | 2016 | |
| 14 | Zootopia 2 | 38.5 | 2025 | |
| 15 | Shrek the Third | 38.45 | 2007 | |
| 16 | Despicable Me 2 | 35.005 | 2013 | |
| 17 | The Super Mario Galaxy Movie | 34.5 | 2026 | |
| 18 | Inside Out | 34.3 | 2015 | |
| 19 | The Super Mario Bros. Movie | 31.7 | 2023 | |
| 20 | Monsters University | 30.59 | 2013 | |
| 21 | Despicable Me 3 | 29.02 | 2017 | |
| 22 | Despicable Me 4 | 27.2 | 2024 | |
| 23 | Cars 2 | 25.78 | 2011 | |
| 24 | Brave | 24.7 | 2012 | |
| 25 | WALL-E | 23.26 | 2008 | |
| 26 | Ice Age: The Meltdown | 21.83 | 2006 | |
| 27 | Up | 21.51 | 2009 | |
| 28 | Despicable Me | 21.3 | 2010 | |
| 29 | Shrek Forever After | 20.83 | 2010 | |
| 30 | Madagascar 3: Europe's Most Wanted | 20.77 | 2012 | |
| 31 | The Incredibles | 20.59 | 2004 | |
| 32 | Kung Fu Panda | 20.33 | 2008 | |
| 33 | Finding Nemo | 20.2 | 2003 | |
| 34 | Cars | 19.74 | 2006 | |
| 35 | Cars 3 | 19.66 | 2017 | |
| 36 | Zootopia | 19.5 | 2016 | |
| 37 | Kung Fu Panda 4 | 19.4 | 2024 | |
| 38 | The Grinch | 18.68 | 2018 | |
| 39 | Ralph Breaks the Internet | 18.53 | 2018 | |
| 40 | How to Train Your Dragon 2 | 18.5 | 2014 | |
| 41 | Monsters, Inc. | 17.83 | 2001 | |
| 42 | Madagascar: Escape 2 Africa | 17.69 | 2008 | |
| 43 | Dr. Seuss' The Lorax | 17.55 | 2012 | |
| 44 | The Lego Movie | 17.1 | 2014 | |
| 45 | Hotel Transylvania 3: Summer Vacation | 16.98 | 2018 | |
| 46 | Monsters vs Aliens | 16.82 | 2009 | |
| 47 | Ice Age Continental Drift | 16.77 | 2012 | |
| 48 | Ratatouille | 16.51 | 2007 | |

== Biggest opening weekend outside the United States for an animated film since 2002 ==
This list charts the biggest opening weekends outside the United States for an animated film since 2002. Figures are given in United States dollars (USD). 75% of the films in the top 12 were released after 2010. 2011 are the most represented years on the list with 4 films. Films must exceed $40 million.

Pixar is the most represented studio with over 5 films on the list.

| rank | film | overseas gross ($million) | year | Ref |
|---|---|---|---|---|
| 1 | Ne Zha 2 | 431.3 | 2025 | |
| 2 | Zootopia 2 | 401.5 | 2025 | |
| 3 | Frozen II | 228.2 | 2019 | |
| 4 | The Super Mario Galaxy Movie | 181.7 | 2026 | |
| 5 | The Super Mario Bros. Movie | 171 | 2023 | |
| 6 | Moana 2 | 163.8 | 2024 | |
| 7 | Toy Story 5 | 152.3 | 2026 | |
| 8 | Jiang Ziya: Legend of Deification | 151.7 | 2020 | |
| 9 | Ice Age: Dawn of the Dinosaurs | 151.7 | 2009 | |
| 10 | Inside Out 2 | 140 | 2024 | |
| 11 | Toy Story 4 | 123.6 | 2019 | |
| 12 | Despicable Me 4 | 106.9 | 2024 | |
| 13 | Minions & Monsters | 98 | 2026 | |
| 14 | The Simpsons Movie | 96.9 | 2007 | |
| 15 | Ne Zha | 94.9 | 2019 | |
| 16 | Spider-Man: Across the Spider-Verse | 88.1 | 2023 | |
| 17 | Ice Age: Continental Drift | 80.3 | 2012 | |
| 18 | Madagascar 3: Europe's Most Wanted | 77.3 | 2013 | |
| 19 | Kung Fu Panda 3 | 75.7 | 2016 | |
| 20 | The Adventures of Tintin | 56.2 | 2011 | |

== See also ==
- List of highest-grossing animated films
- List of highest-grossing openings for films
- Most expensive animated films
