= Ashley Tisdale filmography =

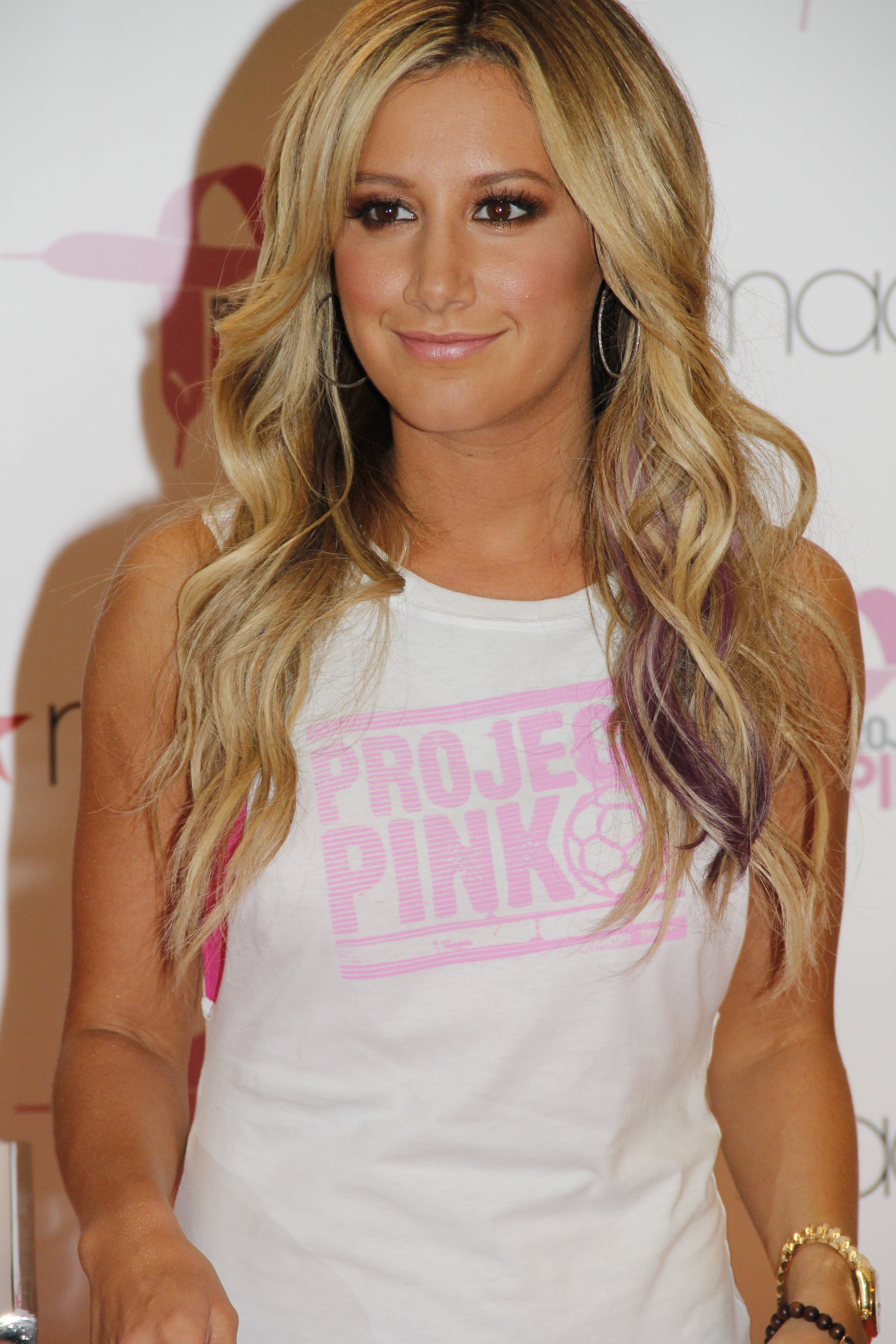
Tisdale at Macy's Herald Square in New York City (July 2012)

American actress Ashley Tisdale has appeared in many motion pictures and television programs since starting her career in 1988. Tisdale made her acting debut at age 12 with small roles in the 1997 television series Smart Guy and 7th Heaven. A year later, she had her first voice role in the feature film A Bug's Life. In the following years, she had small roles in television shows such as Beverly Hills, 90210, The Amanda Show (both 2000), Charmed (1998) in the third season (episode 21), as a runaway teen, The Hughleys (2002), Still Standing (2003) and Boston Public (2000). Her performance in the last earned her a Young Artist Award nomination for "Best Performance in a Television Drama Series." She was eventually cast in her first main role in Disney Channel's The Suite Life of Zack & Cody in 2005, which had three seasons (2005–2008).

Tisdale's breakthrough role came in the 2006 television movie High School Musical, which became Disney Channel's most-watched movie that year. The High School Musical series became a successful franchise which included the second television movie High School Musical 2 (2007), a feature film High School Musical 3: Senior Year (2008), and a spin-off movie Sharpay's Fabulous Adventure (2011).

Tisdale had a main role in Phineas and Ferb (2007–2015; 2025–present), which became television's most-watched animated series among kids and tweens and had very positive reviews, and had guest appearances in Kim Possible (2007), Family Guy, The Cleveland Show, Glenn Martin, DDS (all 2010), Robot Chicken (2014–2021), and American Dad! (2016).

In 2010, Tisdale made her return to broadcast television. She had a leading role in the CW's series Hellcats (2010–2011) and minor roles in Sons of Anarchy, Raising Hope (both 2012), Super Fun Night and The Crazy Ones (both 2013). Tisdale also had a major roles in the sci-fi comedy family film Aliens in the Attic (2009) and the comedy horror parody film Scary Movie 5 (2013). She also provided voice and motion capture performance in the video game The Dark Pictures Anthology: House of Ashes (2021).

She has also worked as an executive producer in films and television shows, including Picture This (2008) and Sharpay's Fabulous Adventure (2011), a television reality show Miss Advised (2012) and the Disney Channel Original Movie, Cloud 9 (2014), among other projects.

== Film ==
=== As an actress ===
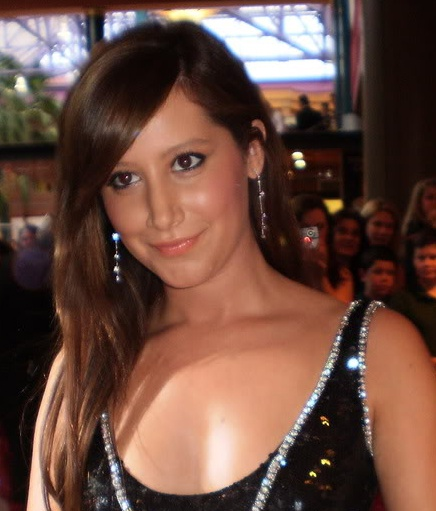
Tisdale at the High School Musical 3: Senior Year premiere in Australia in November 2008

Year	Title (Note: The films are listed in order of release date.)	Role(s)	Director(s)	Notes	Ref.
2001	Donnie Darko	Kim	Richard Kelly		
2002	Nathan's Choice	Stephanie	Robert Berlinger		
2002	The Mayor of Oyster Bay	Jennifer			
2006	High School Musical	Sharpay Evans	Kenny Ortega	Television film	
2007	High School Musical 2	Sharpay Evans	Kenny Ortega	Television film	
2007	Bring It On: In It to Win It	Herself	Steve Rash		
2008	Picture This	Mandy Gilbert	Stephen Herek	Television film; also executive producer	
2008	High School Musical 3: Senior Year	Sharpay Evans	Kenny Ortega		
2009	Aliens in the Attic	Bethany Pearson	John Schultz		
2011	Sharpay's Fabulous Adventure	Sharpay Evans	Michael Lembeck	Television film; also executive producer	
2013	Scary Movie 5	Jody Sanders	Malcolm D. Lee		
2014	Playing It Cool	Herself	Justin Reardon		
2016	Amateur Night	Fallon	Lisa Addario & Joe Syracuse		

=== As a voice actress ===
Year	Title	Role(s)	Director(s)	Notes	Ref.
1997	MGM Sing Alongs	Kate Lionheart	Peter Fitzgerald; Paul Sabella	Direct-to-video	
1998	An All Dogs Christmas Carol	Additional voices	Paul Sabella & Gary Selvaggio	Direct-to-video	
1998	A Bug's Life	Blueberry Scout Leader	John Lasseter		
1995	Whisper of the Heart	Yuko Harada	Yoshifumi Kondō	English dub (produced in 2003, not released until 2006)	
2011	Phineas and Ferb the Movie: Across the 2nd Dimension	Candace Flynn, Candace-2	Dan Povenmire & Robert F. Hughes	Television film	
2013	Saving Santa	Shiny	Leon Joosen	Direct-to-video	
2014	Birds of Paradise	Aurora	Daniel De Felippo & Gustavo Giannini	English dub (originally released in Argentina in 2010)	
2018	Charming	Cinderella	Ross Venokur		
2020	Phineas and Ferb the Movie: Candace Against the Universe	Candace Flynn	Bob Bowen	Disney+ original film	
2023	Baby Shark's Big Movie!	Stariana	Alan Foreman	Nickelodeon original film	
2028	Untitled Third Phineas and Ferb Movie	Candace Flynn	Bob Bowen	Disney+ original film	

== Television ==
=== As an actress ===
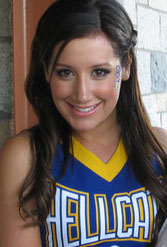
Tisdale on the set of Hellcats in July 2010

Year	Title	Role	Notes	Ref.
1993–1994	Sesame Street	Herself	3 episodes	
1997	Smart Guy	Amy	Episode: "A Little Knowledge"	
1997	7th Heaven	Janice	Episode: "Breaking Up Is Hard to Do"	
2000	Beverly Hills, 90210	Nicole Loomis	Episode: "Fertile Ground"	
2000	Movie Stars	Female student	Episode: "Stand By Me"	
2000	The Amanda Show	Audience Member/ Daphne/ Cold-Curer	3 episodes	
2000	The Geena Davis Show	Tracy	Episode: "Motherly Advice"	
2000	Boston Public	Carol Prader	Episode: "Chapter Five"	
2001	Bette	Jessica	Episode: "The Invisible Mom"	
2001	100 Deeds for Eddie McDowd	Wendy	Episode "Matchmaking Mutt"	
2001	Once and Again	Marni	Episode: "Best of Enemies"	
2001	Kate Brasher	Winona	Episode: "Georgia"	
2001	Charmed	Runaway Teen	Episode: "Look Who's Barking"	
2002	The Hughleys	Stephanie	Guest role (3 episodes) "I Have a Scheme" (Season 4, episode 13) "Bored of the Rings" (Season 4, episode 16) "You've Got Male" (Season 4, episode 18)	
2002	Malcolm in the Middle	Girl outside sewer	Episode "Jury Duty"	
2003	Strong Medicine	Sherry Lowenstein	Episode "Addicted to Love"	
2003	Grounded for Life	Leah	Episode: "Just Like a Woman"	
2003	George Lopez	Olivia	Episode: "I Only Have Eyes for You"	
2003	Still Standing	Bonnie	Guest role (4 episodes) "Still Romancing" (Season 1, episode 15) "Still Hairdressing" (Season 1, episode 16) "Still the Bad Parents" (Season 2, episode 3) "Still Interfering" (Season 2, episode 8)	
2005–2008	The Suite Life of Zack & Cody	Maddie Fitzpatrick	Main role (75 episodes)	
2006	Hannah Montana	Maddie Fitzpatrick	Episode: "On the Road Again"	
2009	The Suite Life on Deck	Maddie Fitzpatrick	Episode: "Maddie on Deck"	
2010–2011	Hellcats	Savannah Monroe	Main role	
2011	Toddlers and Tiaras: Where Are They Now?	Makenzie	Funny or Die online short	
2012	Raising Hope	Mary Louise	Episode: "Jimmy's Fake Girlfriend"	
2012	Sons of Anarchy	Emma Jean	Guest role (2 episodes) "Laying Pipe" (Season 5, episode 3) "Stolen Huffy" (Season 5, episode 4)	
2013	The Crazy Ones	Kelsi Lasker	Episode: "The Intern"	
2013–2014	Super Fun Night	Jazmine Boubier	Guest role (3 episodes) "Engagement Party" (Season 1, episode 4) "Pilot" (Season 1, episode 8) "Dinner Party" (Season 1, episode 11)	
2014	Review	Herself	Episode: "Celebrity; Batman"	
2014–2016	Young & Hungry	Logan Rawlings	Guest role (3 episodes) "Young & Lesbian" (Season 1, episode 3) "Young & Munchies" (Season 2, episode 3) "Young & Sofia" (Season 4, episode 8)	
2015	Clipped	Danni Giordano	Main role	
2016	Truth Be Told	Sam	Episode: "Psychic Chicken"	
2018	MacGyver	Allie Winthrop	Episode: "CO2 Sensor + Tree Branch"	
2019	Merry Happy Whatever	Kayla	Main role	
2019–2020	Carol's Second Act	Jenny Kenney	Main role	

=== As a voice actress ===
Year	Title	Role	Notes	Ref.
1998	Pinky, Elmyra & the Brain	Janson Singer	Episode: "The Girl with Nothing Extra"	
2007	Kim Possible	Camille Leon	3 episodes	
2007–2015, 2025–present	Phineas and Ferb	Candace Flynn, additional voices	Main role	
2010	Glenn Martin, DDS	Katie	Episode: "Dad News Bears"	
2010	The Cleveland Show	Lacey Stapleton	Episode: "The Curious Case of Jr. Working at The Stool"	
2010	Family Guy	Priscilla, Kelly	2 episodes	
2010–2011	Take Two with Phineas and Ferb	Candace Flynn		
2013	Phineas and Ferb: Mission Marvel	Candace Flynn	Television special	
2013–2014	Sabrina: Secrets of a Teenage Witch	Sabrina Spellman	Main role	
2014	Phineas and Ferb: Star Wars	Candace Flynn	Television special	
2014; 2021–2022	Robot Chicken	Various characters	4 episodes	
2016	American Dad!	Amy Reed	Episode: "The Life Aquatic with Steve Smith"	
2016–2018	Skylanders Academy	Stealth Elf	Main role	
2017	Ginger Snaps	Apple	Web series	
2019	Milo Murphy's Law	Candace Flynn, additional voices	Episode: "The Phineas and Ferb Effect"	
2025	Theme Song Takeover	Candace Flynn	Episode: "Candace Theme Song Takeover"	
2025	Cartoonified with Phineas and Ferb	Candace Flynn	Episode: "Brittany Broski"	
2026	Chibiverse	Candace Flynn	Episode: "Candace's Old Year Resolutions"	

=== As herself ===
Year	Title	Notes	Ref.
2006–2007	Disney Channel Games		
2007–2012	Punk'd	Guest role (3 episodes) "Hilary Swank/Ashley Tisdale/Chamillionaire" (Season 8, episode 2) "Evangeline Lilly/Chuck Liddell/Zac Efron" (Season 8, episode 3) "Nick Cannon/New Boyz/Ashley Tisdale/Demi Lovato" (Season 9, episode 6)	
2007	There's Something About Ashley	Also co-executive producer	
2008	Studio DC: Almost Live	Disney Channel special	
2009	Extreme Makeover: Home Edition	Episode: "The Hampton Family" (Season 7, episode 4)	
2009	Walmart Soundcheck	Season 4, episode 17	
2013	Inner Circle	Episode: "Vanessa & Ashley"; also executive producer	
2015	Project Runway	Guest judge; Episode: "It's All in the Cards" (Season 14, episode 2)	
2016	High School Musical: 10th Anniversary	Disney Channel special	
2017	Drop the Mic	Episode: "Mayim Bialik vs. Kunal Nayyar / Ashley Tisdale vs. Nick Lachey"	
2020	The Disney Family Singalong	Disney Channel special	
2020–2021	The Masked Dancer	Panelist	

=== As a producer ===
Year	Title	Role	Notes	Ref.
2012	Miss Advised	Executive producer	Bravo unscripted series	
2014	Cloud 9	Executive producer	Television film	
2014–2018	Young & Hungry	Executive producer	ABC Family series	
2018	Daphne & Velma	Executive producer	Direct-to-video	

== Video games ==
=== As a voice actress ===
Year	Title	Role	Notes	Ref.
2007	The Tuttles: Madcap Misadventures	Jess Tuttle		
2011	Phineas and Ferb: Across the 2nd Dimension	Candace Flynn / Candace 2	Group under Voice Talents	
2013	Phineas and Ferb: Quest for Cool Stuff	Candace Flynn	Group under Voice Talents	
2021	The Dark Pictures Anthology: House of Ashes	Rachel King	Also motion capture	
