= List of most expensive animated films =

The following are lists of animated feature films that were the most expensive to make.

== Definition ==
For purposes of awarding Academy Awards, the Academy of Motion Picture Arts and Sciences defines an animated film as

a motion picture in which movement and characters' performances are created using a frame-by-frame technique, and usually falls into one of the two general fields of animation: narrative or abstract. Some of the techniques of animating films include but are not limited to hand-drawn animation, computer animation, stop-motion, clay animation, pixilation, cutout animation, pinscreen, camera multiple pass imagery, kaleidoscopic effects created frame-by-frame, and drawing on the film frame itself. Motion capture and real-time puppetry are not by themselves animation techniques.

Further, at least 75 percent of the film's running time must contain animation. Narrative animated films must also include a significant number of animated major characters.

The Academy defines a feature film as one with a running time of more than 40 minutes.

== Most expensive animated feature films ==
The years 2007, 2008, 2009, 2010, 2011 and 2016 are the most represented, with three films each.

Pixar is the most represented studio with fourteen films. Shrek is the most represented franchise with three of its four main films on the list, followed by Cars with two of its three main films.

Most expensive animated feature films
Rank	Title	Year	Studio	Budget (est.) (millions)	Ref
1	Tangled	2010	Disney	$260	
2	The Lion King	2019	Disney	$250	
2	Toy Story 5	2026	Pixar	$250	
3	Toy Story 3	2010	Pixar	$200	
3	Cars 2	2011	Pixar	$200	
3	Monsters University	2013	Pixar	$200	
3	Finding Dory	2016	Pixar	$200	
3	Incredibles 2	2018	Pixar	$200	
3	Toy Story 4	2019	Pixar	$200	
3	Lightyear	2022	Pixar	$200	
3	Elemental	2023	Pixar	$200	
3	Inside Out 2	2024	Pixar	$200	
11	Brave	2012	Pixar	$185 (Note: Officially acknowledged figure.)	
12	WALL-E	2008	Pixar	$180	
13	Monsters vs. Aliens	2009	DreamWorks Animation	$175	
13	Up	2009	Pixar	$175	
13	A Christmas Carol	2009	Disney	$175	
13	Inside Out	2015	Pixar	$175	
13	The Good Dinosaur	2015	Pixar	$175	
13	Cars 3	2017	Pixar	$175	
13	Coco	2017	Pixar	$175	
13	Ralph Breaks the Internet	2018	Disney	$175	
19	The Polar Express	2004	ImageMovers	$165	
19	How to Train Your Dragon	2010	DreamWorks Animation	$165	
19	Shrek Forever After	2010	DreamWorks Animation	$165	
19	Wreck-It Ralph	2012	Disney	$165	
19	Big Hero 6	2014	Disney	$165	
25	Shrek the Third	2007	DreamWorks Animation	$160	
26	Shrek 2	2004	DreamWorks Animation	$150	
26	Chicken Little	2005	Disney	$150	
26	Flushed Away	2006	Aardman	$150	
26	Bee Movie	2007	DreamWorks Animation	$150	
26	Meet the Robinsons	2007	Disney	$150	
26	Ratatouille	2007	Pixar	$150	
26	Bolt	2008	Disney	$150	
26	Madagascar: Escape 2 Africa	2008	DreamWorks Animation	$150	
26	Kung Fu Panda 2	2011	DreamWorks Animation	$150	
26	Mars Needs Moms	2011	Disney	$150	
26	Frozen	2013	Disney	$150	
26	Moana	2016	Disney	$150	
26	Zootopia	2016	Disney	$150	
26	Frozen II	2019	Disney	$150	
26	Soul	2020	Pixar	$150	

=== Traditional animation ===
Disney is the most represented studio with 14 films on the list. Winnie the Pooh is the most represented franchise with four films on the list. 2002 is the most represented year with four films.

Title	Year	Studio(s)	Budget (est.)	Ref
Treasure Planet	2002	Disney	$140,000,000	
Tarzan	1999	Disney	$130,000,000	
Atlantis: The Lost Empire	2001	Disney	$120,000,000	
Home on the Range	2004	Disney	$110,000,000	
The Hunchback of Notre Dame	1996	Disney	$100,000,000	
The Princess and the Frog	2009	Disney	$100,000,000	
The Road to El Dorado	2000	DreamWorks Animation	$95,000,000	
Mulan	1998	Disney	$90,000,000	
Hercules	1997	Disney	$80,000,000	
Fantasia 2000	1999	Disney	$80,000,000	
Titan A.E.	2000	Fox Animation	$80,000,000	
Lilo & Stitch	2002	Disney	$80,000,000	
Spirit: Stallion of the Cimarron	2002	DreamWorks Animation	$80,000,000	
The Simpsons Movie	2007	Gracie	$75,000,000	
The SpongeBob Movie: Sponge Out of Water	2015	Nickelodeon Movies	$74,000,000	
The Prince of Egypt	1998	DreamWorks Animation	$70,000,000	
Sinbad: Legend of the Seven Seas	2003	DreamWorks Animation	$60,000,000	
The Boy and the Heron	2023	Studio Ghibli	>$53,300,000	
The Tale of the Princess Kaguya	2013	Studio Ghibli	$53,300,000	
Anastasia	1997	Fox Animation	$50,000,000	
The Iron Giant	1999	WB	$50,000,000	
Curious George	2006	Universal	$50,000,000	
Brother Bear	2003	Disney	$46,000,000	
Piglet's Big Movie	2003	Disneytoon	$46,000,000	
The Lion King	1994	Disney	$45,000,000	
The Little Mermaid	1989	Disney	$40,000,000	
Quest for Camelot	1998	WB	$40,000,000	
The Bob's Burgers Movie	2022	20th Century Studios	$38,000,000	
The Pagemaster	1994	Hanna-Barbera	$34,000,000	
Eight Crazy Nights	2002	Happy Madison	$34,000,000	
Ponyo	2008	Studio Ghibli	$34,000,000	
Cats Don't Dance	1997	WB	$32,000,000	
Oliver & Company	1988	Disney	$31,000,000	
Balto	1995	Amblimation	$31,000,000	
The Wind Rises	2013	Studio Ghibli	$31,000,000	
Pokémon: The First Movie	1998	Oriental Light and Magic (OLM)	$30,000,000	
Pokémon: The Movie 2000	1999	Oriental Light and Magic (OLM)	$30,000,000	
Rugrats in Paris: The Movie	2000	Klasky Csupo	$30,000,000	
The Tigger Movie	2000	Disneytoon	$30,000,000	
The SpongeBob SquarePants Movie	2004	Nickelodeon Movies	$30,000,000	
Winnie the Pooh	2011	Disney	$30,000,000	
Evangelion: 3.0+1.0 Thrice Upon a Time	2021	Studio Khara	$29,992,000	
Aladdin	1992	Disney	$28,000,000	
The Thief and the Cobbler	1993	Completion Bond Company	$28,000,000	
Thumbelina	1994	Don Bluth	$28,000,000	
From Up on Poppy Hill	2011	Studio Ghibli	$28,000,000	
Steamboy	2004	Sunrise / Bandai Visual	$26,000,000	
Asterix and the Vikings	2006	A. Film A/S / M6 Studio / 2d3D Animations	$26,000,000	
Beauty and the Beast	1991	Disney	$25,000,000	
The King and I	1999	Rankin/Bass	$25,000,000	
The Wild Thornberrys Movie	2002	Klasky Csupo	$25,000,000	
Rugrats Go Wild	2003	Klasky Csupo	$25,000,000	
FernGully: The Last Rainforest	1992	Kroyer	$24,000,000	
Howl's Moving Castle	2005	Studio Ghibli	$24,000,000	
Arrietty	2010	Studio Ghibli	$23,000,000	
My Neighbors the Yamadas	1999	Studio Ghibli	$21,000,000	
The Swan Princess	1994	Rich Animation Studios	$21,000,000	
Princess Mononoke	1997	Studio Ghibli	$20,000,000	
Ghost in the Shell 2: Innocence	2004	Production I.G.	$20,000,000	
Recess: School's Out	2001	Disney Television	$20,000,000	
Return to Never Land	2002	Disneytoons	$20,000,000	
The Jungle Book 2	2003	Disneytoons	$20,000,000	
Yu-Gi-Oh! The Movie: Pyramid of Light	2004	Gallop / 4Kids Entertainment	$20,000,000	
Pooh's Heffalump Movie	2005	Disneytoons	$20,000,000	

=== Stop-motion ===
The following films are all stop motion animated films that cost over $10 million to create. 2012 are the most represented years with 3 films each.

Laika is the most represented studio with 5 films. Wallace and Gromit is the most represented franchise with two films on the list.

Title	Year	Studio	Budget (est.)	Ref
Missing Link	2019	Laika	$100,000,000	
Wildwood	2026	Laika	$100,000,000	
The Little Prince	2015	ON Animation Studios	$77,500,000	
Coraline	2009	Laika	$60,000,000	
ParaNorman	2012	Laika	$60,000,000	
The Boxtrolls	2014	Laika	$60,000,000	
Kubo and the Two Strings	2016	Laika	$60,000,000	
The Pirates! In an Adventure with Scientists!	2012	Sony Pictures Animation/Aardman	$55,000,000	
Chicken Run	2000	DreamWorks Animation/Aardman	$45,000,000	
Corpse Bride	2005	Tim Burton	$40,000,000	
Fantastic Mr. Fox	2009	AEP	$40,000,000	
Frankenweenie	2012	Tim Burton	$39,000,000	
James and the Giant Peach	1996	Tim Burton	$38,000,000	
Wallace & Gromit: The Curse of the Were-Rabbit	2005	DreamWorks Animation/Aardman	$30,000,000	
Shaun the Sheep Movie	2015	Aardman/Liongate	$25,000,000	
The Nightmare Before Christmas	1993	Tim Burton	$18,000,000	

=== Anime ===
Title	Year	Studio(s)	Budget (est. ¥)	Budget (est. $)	Ref
The Boy and the Heron	2023	Studio Ghibli	¥5,200,000,000	$53,300,000	
The Tale of the Princess Kaguya	2013	Studio Ghibli	¥5,200,000,000	$53,300,000	
Stand by Me Doraemon	2014	Shirogumi / Robot Communications / Shin-Ei Animation	?	$35,000,000	
Ponyo	2008	Studio Ghibli	¥3,400,000,000	$34,000,000	
Evangelion: 3.0+1.0 Thrice Upon a Time	2021	Studio Khara	¥3,260,000,000	$29,992,000	
Space Pirate Captain Harlock	2013	Toei Animation / Marza Animation Planet	¥3,000,000,000	$31,000,000	
The Wind Rises	2013	Studio Ghibli	¥3,000,000,000	$31,000,000	
Pokémon: The First Movie	1998	Oriental Light and Magic (OLM)	?	$30,000,000	
Pokémon: The Movie 2000	1999	Oriental Light and Magic (OLM)	?	$30,000,000	
Steamboy	2004	Sunrise / Bandai Visual	¥2,400,000,000	$26,000,000	
Howl's Moving Castle	2005	Studio Ghibli	¥2,400,000,000	$24,000,000	
Arrietty	2010	Studio Ghibli	?	$23,000,000	
My Neighbors the Yamadas	1999	Studio Ghibli	¥2,360,000,000	$21,000,000	
Princess Mononoke	1997	Studio Ghibli	¥2,350,000,000	$20,000,000	
From Up on Poppy Hill	2011	Studio Ghibli	¥2,200,000,000	$28,000,000	
Ghost in the Shell 2: Innocence	2004	Production I.G.	¥2,000,000,000	$20,000,000	
Yu-Gi-Oh! The Movie: Pyramid of Light	2004	Gallop / 4Kids Entertainment	?	$20,000,000	
Tales from Earthsea	2006	Studio Ghibli	¥2,200,000,000	$19,000,000	
Spirited Away	2001	Studio Ghibli	¥2,000,000,000	$19,200,000	
Pokémon 3: The Movie	2000	Oriental Light and Magic (OLM)	?	$16,000,000	
When Marnie Was There	2014	Studio Ghibli	¥1,200,000,000	$11,300,000	
Metropolis	2001	Madhouse	¥1,000,000,000	$15,000,000	
Evangelion: 3.0 You Can (Not) Redo	2012	Studio Khara	?	$13,000,000	
Weathering with You	2019	CoMix Wave Films	?	$11,100,000	
The Red Turtle	2016	Studio Ghibli / Why Not Productions / Wild Bunch	?	$11,000,000	
Suzume	2022	CoMix Wave Films	?	$11,000,000	
Akira	1988	Tokyo Movie Shinsha (TMS Entertainment)	¥700,000,000	$5,500,000	
Ninja Scroll	1993	Madhouse	?	$10,000,000	
Evangelion: 2.0 You Can (Not) Advance	2009	Studio Khara	?	$10,000,000	
Dragon Ball Super: Broly	2018	Toei Animation	?	$8,500,000	
Robotech: The Movie	1986	Tatsunoko Production / Harmony Gold USA / AIC	?	$8,000,000	
The End of Evangelion	1997	Gainax, Production I.G.	?	$7,500,000	
Porco Rosso	1992	Studio Ghibli	¥900,000,000	$7,100,000	
Evangelion: 1.0 You Are (Not) Alone	2007	Studio Khara	?	$7,000,000	
Street Fighter II: The Animated Movie	1994	Group TAC / SEDIC / Sony Music Entertainment Japan	?	$6,000,000	
Kiki's Delivery Service	1989	Studio Ghibli	¥800,000,000	$5,800,000	
Royal Space Force: The Wings of Honnêamise	1987	Gainax / Bandai Visual	¥800,000,000	$5,531,000	
Jin-Roh: The Wolf Brigade	1998	Production I.G.	?	$5,000,000	
Dragon Ball Z: Resurrection 'F'	2015	Toei Animation	?	$5,000,000	
Castle in the Sky	1986	Studio Ghibli	¥800,000,000	$4,700,000	
Interstella 5555: The 5tory of the 5ecret 5tar 5ystem	2003	Toei Animation / Daft Life / Wild Bunch / BAC Films	?	$4,000,000	
The Castle of Cagliostro	1979	Tokyo Movie Shinsha	¥500,000,000	$2,300,000	
In This Corner of the World	2016	MAPPA	¥400,000,000	$3,750,000	
Macross: Do You Remember Love?	1984	Studio Nue / Artland / Topcraft / Tatsunoko Production	¥400,000,000	$2,000,000	
Nausicaä of the Valley of the Wind	1984	Studio Ghibli	¥400,000,000	$2,000,000	
Your Name	2016	CoMix Wave Films	¥370,000,000	?	
Farewell to Space Battleship Yamato	1978	Academy Productions / Group TAC	¥360,000,000	$3,600,000	
Paprika	2006	Madhouse	¥300,000,000	$4,000,000	
Tokyo Godfathers	2004	Madhouse	¥300,000,000	$2,400,000	
Millennium Actress	2002	Madhouse	?	$1,200,000	
The Case of Hana & Alice	2015	Steve N' Steven	¥250,000,000	?	
Patlabor 2: The Movie	1993	Production I.G	¥220,000,000	?	
Space Battleship Yamato	1977	Academy Productions / Group TAC	¥200,000,000	$745,000	
Biohazard 4D-Executer	2000	Visual Science Laboratory	¥150,000,000	$1,400,000	
The Garden of Words	2013	CoMix Wave Films	¥150,000,000	?	

Back-to-back film productions
Title(s)	Year(s)	Studio	Budget (est. ¥)	Budget (est. $)	Ref
Fist of the North Star: The Legends of the True Savior	2006–2008	TMS Entertainment	¥2,500,000,000	$24,300,000	
My Neighbor Totoro and Grave of the Fireflies	1988	Studio Ghibli	¥1,200,000,000	$9,400,000	

== Timeline of most expensive animated films ==
The following is a timeline of the most expensive animated films since 1937.

Title	Established	Budget (est.) (millions)	Studio	Ref
Snow White and the Seven Dwarfs	1937	$1.49	Disney	
Pinocchio	1940	$2.29	Disney	
Cinderella	1950	$2.9	Disney	
Peter Pan	1953	$4	Disney	
Sleeping Beauty	1959	$6	Disney	
The Black Cauldron	1985	$44	Disney	
The Lion King	1994	$45	Disney	
Pocahontas	1995	$55	Disney	
The Hunchback of Notre Dame	1996	$100	Disney	
A Bug's Life	1998	$120	Pixar	
Tarzan	1999	$130	Disney	
Final Fantasy: The Spirits Within	2001	$137	Square Pictures	
Treasure Planet	2002	$140	Disney	
Shrek 2	2004	$150	DreamWorks Animation	
The Polar Express	2004	$165	ImageMovers	
WALL-E	2008	$180	Pixar	
Toy Story 3	June 2010	$200	Pixar	
Tangled	November 2010	$260	Disney	

=== Timeline of most expensive computer–animated films ===
Title	Established	Budget (est.) (millions)	Studio	Ref
Toy Story	1995	$30	Pixar	
Antz	October 1998	$42	DreamWorks Animation	
A Bug's Life	November 1998	$120	Pixar	
Dinosaur	2000	$127.5	Disney	
Final Fantasy: The Spirits Within	2001	$137	Square Pictures	
The Polar Express	2004	$165	ImageMovers	
WALL•E	2008	$180	Pixar	
Toy Story 3	June 2010	$200	Pixar	
Tangled	November 2010	$260	Disney	

=== Timeline of most expensive traditionally animated films ===
Title	Established	Budget (est.) (millions)	Studio	Ref
Snow White and the Seven Dwarfs	1937	$1.49	Disney	
Pinocchio	1940	$2.29	Disney	
Cinderella	1950	$2.9	Disney	
Peter Pan	1953	$4	Disney	
Sleeping Beauty	1959	$6	Disney	
The Black Cauldron	1985	$44	Disney	
The Lion King	1994	$45	Disney	
Pocahontas	1995	$55	Disney	
The Hunchback of Notre Dame	1996	$100	Disney	
Tarzan	1999	$130	Disney	
Treasure Planet	2002	$140	Disney	

=== Timeline of most expensive stop-motion animated films ===
The following is a timeline of most expensive stop-motion animated films of all time. Laika is the most represented studio with four films.

Title	Established	Budget (est.) (millions)	Studio	Ref
The Nightmare Before Christmas	1993	$18	Tim Burton	
Chicken Run	2000	$45	Aardman	
Coraline	2009	$60	Laika	
ParaNorman	2012	$60	Laika	
The Boxtrolls	2014	$60	Laika	
The Little Prince	2015	$77.5	ON	
Missing Link	2019	$100	Laika	

== See also ==
- List of highest-grossing animated films
- List of highest-grossing anime films
- List of highest-grossing openings for animated films
- List of most expensive films
