= Alibaba and the Thief =

- 阿里巴巴：大盗奇兵
- Directed by: Zheng Chengfeng
- Release date: May 23, 2015
- Running time: 80 minutes
- Country: China
- Language: Mandarin
- Box office: CN¥10.92 million (China)

Alibaba and the Thief (Chinese: 阿里巴巴：大盗奇兵) is a 2015 Chinese animated children's adventure film directed by Zheng Chengfeng. It was released in China on May 23, 2015.

== Voice cast ==
- Ye Fang
- Ding Yan
- Zhang Yang
- Wu Rui
- Yang Yang
- Wang Qi
- Sun Ke
- Zhang YuanZhong
- Wang Xueqin
- Wang Yalin
- Lu Yao

== Box office ==
By May 23, 2015, the film had earned CN¥10.92 million at the Chinese box office.

== Sequels ==
Alibaba and the Thief was followed by two sequels, Alibaba 2: Seal of Solomon in 2016 and Alibaba and the Three Golden Hair in 2018.
