= List of animated feature films of 2010 =

This is a list of animated feature films first released in 2010.

== List ==
Animated feature films first released in 2010
Title	Country	Director	Production company	Animation technique	Type	Notes	Release date	Duration
AAA - The Movie; AAA, la película: Sin límite en el tiempo	Mexico	Alberto Rodriguez	Promociones Antonio Peña; Ánima Estudios	Flash			January 22, 2010	96 minutes
Alpha and Omega	United States	Anthony Bell; Ben Gluck	Crest Animation Productions	Computer			September 8, 2010 (TIFF); September 17, 2010	88 minutes
Alice in Wonderland	United States	Tim Burton	Walt Disney Pictures; Roth Films; The Zanuck Company; Team Todd	Computer / Live action	Theatrical		March 5, 2010	108 minutes
Animals United; Konferenz der Tiere	Germany	Reinhard Klooss, Holger Tappe	Constantin Film	Computer			October 7, 2010	93 minutes
Anpanman: Blacknose and the Magical Song それいけ!アンパンマン ブラックノーズと魔法の歌	Japan	Jun Kawagoe	Anpanman Production Committee; TMS Entertainment	Traditional			July 10, 2014	52 minutes
Arthur 3: The War of the Two Worlds; Arthur et la guerre des deux mondes	France	Luc Besson	EuropaCorp	Computer / Live action			October 13, 2010 (France); March 22, 2011 (United States)	101 minutes
Barbie: A Fashion Fairy Tale	United States	William Lau	Rainmaker Entertainment	Computer	Direct-to-video		September 14, 2010	79 minutes
Barbie in A Mermaid Tale	United States	Adam L. Wood	Rainmaker Entertainment	Computer	Direct-to-video		March 9, 2010	75 minutes
Batman: Under the Red Hood	United States	Brandon Vietti	Warner Bros. Animation	Traditional	Direct-to-video		July 27, 2010	75 minutes
Berry and Dolly - Friends hu:Bogyó és Babóca - 13 mese	Hungary	Antonin Krizanics; Géza M. Tóth	Kedd Animation Studio	Traditional			August 12, 2010	65 minutes
Bleach: Hell Verse; BLEACH 地獄篇 (Burīchi Jigoku-Hen)	Japan	Noriyuki Abe	Studio Pierrot	Traditional			December 4, 2010	94 minutes
Book Girl 劇場版文学少女 (Gekijōban Bungaku Shōjo)	Japan	Shunsuke Tada	Production I.G	Traditional			May 1, 2010	103 minutes
Bratz: Pampered Petz	United States	Bob Doucette	Mike Young Productions; MGA Entertainment	Computer	Direct-to-DVD		October 5, 2010	70 minutes
Bye-Bye Bin Laden	United States	Scott Sublett	San Jose State University	Traditional			March 28, 2009 (South Beach International Animation Festival) (premiere); February 18, 2010 (Beloit International Film Festival)	73 minutes
Care Bears: Share Bear Shines	United States	Davis Doi	SD Entertainment; American Greetings	Computer			March 10, 2010 (Australia); August 15, 2010	70 minutes
A Cat in Paris; Une vie de chat	France; Switzerland; Netherlands; Belgium	Alain Gagnol, Jean-Loup Felicioli	Folimage	Traditional			December 15, 2010	65 minutes
Cats & Dogs: The Revenge of Kitty Galore	United States; Australia	Brad Peyton	Village Roadshow Pictures; CD2 Pictures; Mad Chance; Polymorphic Pictures	Computer / Live action			July 30, 2010	82 minutes
Chico and Rita	Spain; United Kingdom	Fernando Trueba, Javier Mariscal	Isle of Man Film, Magic Light Pictures	Traditional			November 19, 2010 (United Kingdom); February 25, 2011 (Spain)	94 minutes
Colorful カラフル	Japan	Keiichi Hara	Sunrise	Traditional			August 21, 2010	127 minutes
Crayon Shin-chan: Super-Dimension! The Storm Called My Bride クレヨンしんちゃん 超時空！嵐を呼ぶオラの花嫁 (Kureyon Shinchan: Chōjikū! Arashi o Yobu Ora no Hanayome)	Japan	Akira Shigino	Shin-Ei Animation	Traditional			April 17, 2010	100 minutes
Pet Pals: Marco Polo's Code; Cuccioli Il Codice di Marco	Italy	Sergio Manfio	Gruppo Alcuni Srl	Computer			January 22, 2010	94 minutes (English) (USA); 95 minutes 99 minutes (Italy)
Dante's Inferno: An Animated Epic	United States; Japan; South Korea	Victor Cook; Mike Disa; Sang-Jin Kim; Shuko Murase; Jong-Sik Nam; Lee Seung-Gyu	Production I.G	Traditional	Direct-to-video		February 9, 2010	88 minutes
Daredevils of Sasun; Սասնա ծռեր (Sasna Tsrer)	Armenia	Arman Manaryan		Traditional		First Armenian animated feature	January 25, 2010	80 minutes
Despicable Me	United States	Pierre Coffin; Chris Renaud	Illumination Entertainment	Computer	Theatrical		June 19, 2010 (MIFF); July 9, 2010	95 minutes
Detective Conan: The Lost Ship in the Sky	Japan	Yasuichiro Yamamoto	TMS Entertainment	Traditional			April 17, 2010	102 minutes
The Disappearance of Haruhi Suzumiya 涼宮ハルヒの消失 (Suzumiya Haruhi no Shōshitsu)	Japan	Tatsuya Ishihara; Yasuhiro Takemoto	Kyoto Animation	Traditional			February 6, 2010	162 minutes
Doraemon: Nobita's Great Battle of the Mermaid King ドラえもん のび太の人魚大海戦 (Doraemon Nobita no Ningyo Daikaisen)	Japan	Kozo Kusuba	Vega Entertainment	Traditional			March 6, 2010	99 minutes
Diary of a Wimpy Kid	United States	Thor Freudenthal	Fox 2000 Pictures; Color Force	Traditional / Live action	Theatrical		March 19, 2010	92 minutes
The Drawn Together Movie: The Movie!	United States	Greg Franklin	Comedy Central Films; Double Hemm; 6 Point Harness	Flash	Direct-to-video		March 18, 2010 (South by Southwest); April 20, 2010	71 minutes
Eden of the East – Paradise Lost 東のエデン (Higashi no Eden)	Japan	Kenji Kamiyama	Production I.G	Traditional			March 13, 2010	95 minutes
Elias and the Treasure of the Sea; Elias og jakten på havets gull	Norway	Lise I. Osvoll		Computer			December 10, 2010	77 minutes
Fate/stay night Unlimited Blade Works フェイト/ステイナイト (Feito/sutei naito)	Japan	Yūji Yamaguchi	Studio Deen	Traditional			January 23, 2010	107 minutes
Firebreather	United States	Peter Chung	Cartoon Network Studios	Computer	Television film		November 24, 2010	97 minutes
Frog Paradise; Лягушачий Рай (Lyagushachiy Rai)	Russia	Sergei Bazhenov	BS Graphics Production	Computer			September 5, 2011	87 minutes
Gaturro: The Movie; Gaturro La Pelicula	Argentina; India; Mexico	Gustavo Cova	Toonz Entertainment; Illusion Studios; Ánima Estudios; Voltage Pictures	Computer			September 9, 2010	87 minutes
Godkiller: Walk Among Us	United States	Matt Pizzolo	Halo-8 Entertainment; King's Mob Productions	Traditional			April 20, 2010 (C2E2); May 28, 2010 (United States)	88 minutes
Green Days k소중한 날의 꿈 (Sojunghan Nare Kkum)	South Korea	Han Hye-jin; An Jae-hoon	Studio Yeonpilro Myeongsanghagi	Traditional			November 13, 2010 (London Korean Film Festival); June 23, 2011	98 minutes
Guardians of the Lost Code; Brijes 3D	Mexico	Benito Fernández	Fidecine; Santo Domingo Animation	Traditional			September 16, 2010	89 minutes
Halo Legends	Japan; Germany; United States	Frank O'Connor; Joseph Chou	Studio 4°C; Production I.G; Casio Entertainment; Toei Animation; Bones; Bee Train; Warner Bros. 343 Industries	Traditional			February 16, 2010	120 minutes
HeartCatch PreCure! the Movie: Fashion Show in the Flower Capital... Really?! ハートキャッチプリキュア!花の都でファッションショー・・・ですか!? (HātoKyatchi PuriKyua! Hana no miyako de Fashion Show... desu ka!?)	Japan	Rie Matsumoto	Toei Animation	Traditional			October 30, 2010	71 minutes
Héroes verdaderos	Mexico	Carlos Kuri	Fidecine Instituto Mexicano de Cinematografía (IMCINE) Quality Films	Traditional			September 24, 2010	100 minutes
Hetalia: Axis Powers – Paint it, White!	Japan	Bob Shirohata	Studio Deen	Traditional			June 5, 2010	61 minutes
How Not to Rescue a Princess; Три богатыря и Шамаханская царица (Tri bogatyrya i Shamakhanskaya tsaritsa)	Russia	Sergei Glezin	Melnitsa Animation Studio	Traditional			December 30, 2010	77 minutes
How to Train Your Dragon	United States	Chris Sanders; Dean DeBlois	DreamWorks Animation	Computer	Theatrical		March 21, 2010 (Gibson Amphitheater); March 26, 2010	98 minutes
Hutch the Honeybee 昆虫物語 みつばちハッチ〜勇気のメロディ〜 (Konchū Monogatari: Mitsubachi Hatchi: Yūki no Merodī)	Japan	Tetsurō Amino	Tatsunoko Pro	Traditional			July 31, 2010	101 minutes
The Illusionist; L'Illusionniste	France; United Kingdom	Sylvain Chomet	Pathé; Django Films; Allied Filmmakers	Traditional			June 16, 2010 (France); August 16, 2010 (United Kingdom)	79 minutes
Inazuma Eleven Saikyō Gundan Ōga Shūrai イナズマイレブン 最強軍団オーガ襲来 (Inazuma Eleven Saikyō Gundan Ōga Shūrai)	Japan	Yoshikazu Miyao	Oriental Light and Magic	Traditional			December 23, 2010	90 minutes
A Jewish Girl in Shanghai 猶太女孩在上海	China	Wang Genfa; Zhang Zhenhui	Shanghai Animation Film Studio; Shanghai Film Group Corporation	Traditional			May 2010	80 minutes
Justice League: Crisis on Two Earths	United States	Lauren Montgomery; Sam Liu	Warner Bros. Animation	Traditional	Direct-to-video		February 23, 2010	75 minutes
Kayıp Armağan	Turkey	Kerem S. Hünal	Sobee Studios	Traditional			August 22, 2010	56 minutes
King of Thorn いばらの王 (Ibara no Ō)	Japan	Kazuyoshi Katayama	Kadokawa Pictures	Traditional			October 2009 (Sitges International Film Festival of Cataluna); May 1, 2010	120 minutes
Kung-Fu Magoo	United States; Mexico	Andrés Couturier	Classic Media; Ánima Estudios; Santo Domingo Films; Motion Toons; IMCINE	Flash	Direct-to-video		May 11, 2010	79 minutes
Lava Kusa: The Warrior Twins	India	Dhavala Satyam	Kanipakam Creations; RVML Animation	Traditional			October 8, 2010	120 minutes
Legend of the Guardians: The Owls of Ga'Hoole	Australia; United States	Zack Snyder	Warner Bros. Pictures; Village Roadshow Pictures; Animal Logic; GOG Productions	Computer	Theatrical		September 24, 2010 (United States); September 30, 2010 (Australia)	97 minutes
Lego: The Adventures of Clutch Powers	United States; Denmark	Howard E. Baker	Threshold Animation Studios; Tinseltown Toons; The LEGO Group	Computer			February 23, 2010	82 minutes
Lost Planet; Потерянная Планета	Russia	Dmitry Petrov	21st Century Petrov Productions	Computer			June 23, 2010; September 14, 2010	95 minutes
Loups=Garous ルー=ガルー (Rū Garū)	Japan	Junichi Fujisaku	Production I.G; TransArts	Traditional			August 28, 2010	99 minutes
Luke and Lucy: The Texas Rangers; Suske en Wiske: De Texas-Rakkers	Belgium; Luxembourg; Netherlands	Mark Mertens; Wim Bien	Skyline Entertainment; CoBo Fonds; AVRO; Studio Vandersteen; Standaard Uitgeverij; Cotoon Studio; Flanders Audiovisual Fund (VAF); LuxAnimation	Computer			July 21, 2009 (Belgium); July 23, 2009 (Netherlands); November 5, 2010 (United States)	86 minutes
Magical Girl Lyrical Nanoha The Movie 1st 魔法少女リリカルなのは The MOVIE 1st (Mahō Shōjo Lyrical Nanoha The MOVIE 1st)	Japan	Keizou Kusakawa	Seven Arcs	Traditional			January 23, 2010	130 minutes
Mardock Scramble: The First Compression マルドゥック・スクランブル (Marudukku Sukuranburu)	Japan	Susumu Kudo	GoHands	Traditional			November 6, 2010	69 minutes
Mars	United States	Geoff Marslett	Cinema Lapiniere; Film Science; Marsnaut Films	Rotoscope			March 13, 2010 (South by Southwest Film Festival); December 3, 2010	90 minutes
Marmaduke	United States	Tom Dey	Regency Enterprises; Davis Entertainment; Dune Entertainment	Computer / Live action	Theatrical		June 4, 2010	86 minutes
Megamind	United States	Tom McGrath	DreamWorks Animation; PDI/DreamWorks	Computer	Theatrical		October 28, 2010 (Russia); November 5, 2010	96 minutes
Mobile Suit Gundam 00 the Movie: A Wakening of the Trailblazer 劇場版 機動戦士ガンダム00 -A wakening of the Trailblazer- (Gekijōban Kidō Senshi Gandamu Daburu Ō -A wēkuningu obu za Torēruburēzā-)	Japan	Seiji Mizushima	Sunrise	Traditional			September 18, 2010	120 minutes
Moomins and the Comet Chase	Finland	Maria Lindberg	Stereoscape Ltd.	Stop motion			August 6, 2010; October 22, 2017 (United States)	75 minutes
Naruto Shippuden The Movie: The Lost Tower 劇場版 NARUTO-ナルト-疾風伝 ザ・ロストタワー (Gekijōban Naruto Shippūden: Za Rosuto Tawā)	Japan	Masahiko Murata	Aniplex	Traditional			July 31, 2010	85 minutes
Olsen Gang Gets Polished; Olsen-banden på de bonede gulve	Denmark	Jørgen Lerdam		Computer			October 14, 2010	70 minutes
Open Season 3	United States	Cody Cameron	Sony Pictures Animation; Reel FX Animation Studios	Computer	Direct-to-video		October 21, 2010 (Russia); January 25, 2011	75 minutes
Piercing I	China	Liu Jian		Traditional			June 12, 2010 (Annecy Animation Film Festival)	73 minutes
Planet Hulk	United States	Sam Liu	Marvel Animation	Traditional	Direct-to-video		February 2, 2010	81 minutes
Planzet プランゼット	Japan	Jun Awazu	CoMix Wave	Computer			May 22, 2010	53 minutes
Pleasant Goat and Big Big Wolf – Desert Trek: The Adventure of the Lost Totem 喜羊羊与灰太狼之虎虎生威	China			Traditional			January 29, 2010 (Mainland China); February 13, 2010 (Hong Kong); July 23, 2010 (Taiwan)	88 minutes
Ploddy the Police Car Makes a Splash	Norway	Rasmus A. Sivertsen	Neofilm AS; Qvisten Animation	Computer			December 25, 2009 (Oslo); January 8, 2010	74 minutes
Plumíferos	Argentina	Daniel DeFelippo; Gustavo Giannini	CS Entertainment; Manos Digitales Animation Studio; 100 Bares Producciones; Telefe	Computer			February 18, 2010	80 minutes
Pokémon: Zoroark: Master of Illusions 劇場版ポケットモンスター ダイヤモンド＆パール 幻影の覇者 ゾロアーク (Gekijōban Poketto Monsutā Daiyamondo ando Pāru: Gen'ei no Hasha: Zoroāku)	Japan	Kunihiko Yuyama	OLM, Inc.	Traditional			July 10, 2010	95 minutes
Pretty Cure All Stars DX2: Light of Hope☆Protect the Rainbow Jewel! プリキュアオールスターズDX2 希望の光☆レインボージュエルを守れ! (Precure All Stars DX2: Kibō no Hikari☆Rainbow Jewel o Mamore!)	Japan	Takashi Otsuka	Toei Animation	Traditional			March 20, 2010	74 minutes
Quantum Quest: A Cassini Space Odyssey	United States	Harry Kloor; Daniel St. Pierre	DigiMax Animation; Jupiter 9 Productions	Computer			January 13, 2010	45 minutes
Ramayana: The Epic	India	Chetan Desai	Maya Digital Media	Computer			October 15, 2010	98 minutes
RPG Metanoia	Philippines	Louie Suarez	Star Cinema; Ambient Media; Thaumatrope Animation	Computer			December 25, 2010	103 minutes
Santa's Apprentice; L'Apprenti Père Noël	France; Australia; Ireland	Luc Vinciguerra	Gaumont-Alphanim; Flying Bark Productions Pty. Ltd. Avrill Stark Entertainment; Cartoon Saloon	Traditional			November 24, 2010	77 minutes
Scooby-Doo! Abracadabra-Doo	United States	Spike Brandt	Warner Bros. Animation; Hanna-Barbera	Traditional	Direct-to-video		February 16, 2010	75 minutes
Scooby-Doo! Camp Scare	United States	Ethan Spaulding	Warner Bros. Animation; Hanna-Barbera	Traditional	Direct-to-video		September 14, 2010	72 minutes
The Secret World of Arrietty 借りぐらしのアリエッティ (Kari-gurashi no Arietti)	Japan	Hiromasa Yonebayashi	Studio Ghibli	Traditional			July 17, 2010	95 minutes
Shrek Forever After	United States	Mike Mitchell	DreamWorks Animation	Computer	Theatrical		May 21, 2010	93 minutes
Space Chimps 2: Zartog Strikes Back	United States	John H. Williams	Vanguard Animation	Computer	Direct-to-video		May 28, 2010 (United Kingdom); October 5, 2010	76 minutes
Space Dogs; Белка и Стрелка. Звёздные собаки (Belka i Strelka. Zvyozdnye sobaki)	Russia	Inna Evlannikova; Svyatoslav Ushakov	Centre of National Film	Computer			March 18, 2010; April 2, 2010 (United Kingdom)	85 minutes
Superman/Batman: Apocalypse	United States	Lauren Montgomery	Warner Bros. Animation	Traditional	Direct-to-video		September 28, 2010	78 minutes
Tangled	United States	Nathan Greno; Byron Howard	Walt Disney Animation Studios	Computer	Theatrical		November 14, 2010 (El Capitan Theatre); November 24, 2010	100 minutes
Tigers and Tattoos; Tigre og Tatoveringer	Denmark	Karla von Bengtson	Copenhagen Bombay	Traditional			October 14, 2010	42 minutes
Tinker Bell and the Great Fairy Rescue	United States	Bradley Raymond	Disneytoon Studios	Computer			August 13, 2010 (United Kingdom); September 21, 2010	79 minutes
Tom and Jerry Meet Sherlock Holmes	United States	Spike Brandt, Jeff Siergey	Warner Bros. Animation	Traditional	Direct-to-video		August 16, 2010 (United Kingdom); August 24, 2010	50 minutes
Toy Story 3	United States	Lee Unkrich	Pixar Animation Studios	Computer	Theatrical		June 12, 2010 (Taormina Film Fest); June 18, 2010	103 minutes
The Drawn Together Movie: The Movie!	United States	Dave Jeser; Matt Silverstein	6 Point Harness; Comedy Central Films	Flash	Direct-to-video		April 20, 2010	71 minutes
Trigun: Badlands Rumble 「劇場版TRIGUN Badlands Rumble	Japan	Satoshi Nishimura	Madhouse	Traditional			April 24, 2010	90 minutes
La tropa de trapo en el país donde siempre brilla el sol	Spain	Alex Colls	Anera Films; Continental Animacion; Abano Productions	Computer			June 22, 2010 (Madrid); October 29, 2010	76 minutes
True Heroes: Independence; Heroes Verderos	Mexico	Carlos Kuri	White Knight Creative Productions	Traditional			September 24, 2010	100 minutes
A Turtle's Tale: Sammy's Adventures; Sammy's Avonturen: de geheime doorgang	Belgium; France	Ben Stassen	StudioCanal nWave Pictures; Illuminata Pictures	Computer			June 12, 2010 (California); August 11, 2010 (France)	88 minutes
The Ugly Duckling; Гадкий утёнок (мультфильм) (Gadkiy utyonok)	Russia	Garri Bardin	Stayer	Stop motion			August 11, 2010 (Locarno Film Festival) (premiere); September 16, 2010	75 minutes
Ultramarines: A Warhammer 40,000 Movie	United Kingdom	Martyn Pick	Good Story Productions; Codex Pictures; POP6	Computer	Direct-to-video		December 13, 2010	70 minutes
VeggieTales: It's a Meaningful Life	United States	Brian Roberts	Big Idea Productions	Computer	Direct-to-video		October 5, 2010	48 minutes
VeggieTales: Pistachio - The Little Boy That Woodn't	United States	Mike Nawrocki	Big Idea Productions	Computer	Direct-to-video		February 27, 2010	50 minutes
VeggieTales: Sweetpea Beauty: A Girl After God's Own Heart	United States	Mike Nawrocki	Big Idea Productions	Computer	Direct-to-video		July 31, 2010	50 minutes
Welcome to the Space Show 宇宙ショーへようこそ (Uchū Shō e Yōkoso)	Japan	Koji Masunari	A-1 Pictures	Traditional			February 18, 2010 (Berlinale); June 26, 2010	136 minutes
Winx Club 3D: Magical Adventure; Winx Club 3D: Magica Avventura	Italy	Iginio Straffi	Rainbow CGI Animation Studio	Computer			October 29, 2010	87 minutes
Yu-Gi-Oh!: Bonds Beyond Time; 10thアニバーサリー 劇場版 遊☆戯☆王 ～超融合！時空を越えた絆～ (Tensū Anibāsarī Gekijōban Yū-Gi-Ō: Chō-Yūgō! Toki o Koeta Kizuna)	Japan	Kenichi Takeshita	Studio Gallop	Traditional			January 23, 2010	50 minutes
Yogi Bear	United States	Eric Brevig	De Line Pictures; Sunswept Entertainment	Computer / Live action			December 17, 2010	80 minutes
The Dreams of Jinsha 梦回金沙城 (Meng hui jin sha cheng)	China	Chen Deming	Hangzhou C&L Digital Production	Traditional			July 10, 2010; December 3, 2010 (United States)	85 minutes

== Highest-grossing films ==
The following is a list of the 10 highest-grossing animated feature films first released in 2010.

Highest-grossing animated films of 2010
Rank	Title	Distributor / Studio	Worldwide gross
1	Toy Story 3	Disney/Pixar	$1,068,879,522
2	Shrek Forever After	DreamWorks Animation	$752,600,867
3	Tangled	Disney	$591,794,936
4	Despicable Me	Universal Pictures / Illumination Entertainment	$543,113,985
5	How to Train Your Dragon	Paramount Pictures / DreamWorks Animation	$494,878,759
6	Megamind	Paramount Pictures / DreamWorks Animation	$321,885,765
7	The Secret World of Arrietty	Toho / Studio Ghibli	$149,411,550
8	Legend of the Guardians: The Owls of Ga'Hoole	Warner Bros.	$140,073,390
9	Pokémon: Zoroark: Master of Illusions	Toho / OLM, Inc.	$71,143,529
10	Doraemon: Nobita's Great Battle of the Mermaid King	Toho / Shin-Ei Animation	$38,100,000

Toy Story 3 became the first animated film to reach over $1 billion.

== See also ==
- List of animated television series of 2010
