= Two Tails =

2018 Russian film

- Theatrical release poster
- Russian: Два Хвоста
- Directed by: Victor Azeev
- Screenplay by: Vasily Rovensky (script)
- Production company: Licensing Brands LLC
- Distributed by: CaroProkat; Recreation Media (worldwide)
- Release date: 31 May 2018
- Running time: 77 minutes
- Country: Russia
- Language: Russian
- Box office: $3,390,149

Two Tails (Russian: Два хвоста, romanized: Dva khvosta) is a 2018 Russian animated science-fiction adventure comedy film directed by Victor Azeev and co-directed by Natalia Nilova, from a script by Vasily Rovensky. Produced by Licensing Brands, the film had its world premiere in Russia on 25 May 2018, and was released theatrically in Russia on 31 May to mixed reviews. It had a worldwide gross of $3,390,149.

== Plot ==
Bob is a beaver who lives in a forest, while a cat named Max wishes to become famous. One day, while getting lost in the forest, he discovers Bob's house, and decides to stay there. The next day, the two discover an energy source under a tree. Suddenly, a UFO crashes, and three aliens named Zaca, Zuc, and Zic emerge from the spaceship. The two get to know them, and the aliens convince them that the energy source is needed to power their spaceship.

Later, the group meet a boy named Baz. Explaining that Max has built a hot air balloon earlier at his visit, the group decides to make one to try lift the spaceship, but the aliens are captured by a group of alien hunters named Nick and Vic. The three give chase until the hunters fall into a trap set by Baz, and the group take their truck back to the house.

Meanwhile, another group of aliens named the Scratchers arrive on Earth, and abduct a number of animals, including Max, Nick and Vic. The aliens explain to Bob and Baz that the Scratchers abduct animals and send them to a Space Zoo, and that they followed them while the three were in pursuit of the energy source and that they caused their crash. Max escapes the spaceships lock-up, and returns home, only to find his friends gone. Discovering that the Scratchers abducted his friends, he decides to rescue them. Confronting the Scratchers, he fights and is able to defeat them. Afterwards, he frees all the captives, and they all depart as they send the Scratchers to the Space Zoo.

== Production ==
The film was produced by Licensing Brands LLC. Production began in June 2015, and the film was granted funding from the Cinema Foundation of Russia on 14 June 2016.

== Release and reception ==
Two Tails received its world premiere in Russia on 25 May 2018, before being released theatrically in Russia on 31 May by CaroProkat.

=== Box office ===
In its opening weekend in Russia, the film grossed 44.660 million Russian rubles ($688,933), entering the top five films of that week. By the end of its theatrical run, it grossed 107 million rubles ($1,682,413). The second highest-grossing country was Poland, where it was the fifth highest-grossing film at their box office in its first and second weeks, with 12,371 and 33,955 tickets sold respectively. At the end of its run, it grossed $438,886 from 99,082 total tickets sold, adding to its worldwide total of $3,390,149.

=== Critical reception ===
The film received mixed to average reviews from critics, with particular criticism aimed towards its storyline and clichés, but received positive reviews for its characters and entertainment value for its age demographic.
