= Coconut the Little Dragon 2: Into the Jungle =

2019 German adventure comedy film

- Poster
- German: Der kleine Drache Kokosnuss - Auf in den Dschungel!
- Directed by: Anthony Power
- Screenplay by: Mark Slater; Gabriele Walther
- Produced by: Gabriele Walther
- Music by: Stefan Maria Schneider
- Production company: Caligari Film
- Release date: 27 December 2018
- Running time: 80 minutes
- Countries: Germany; United States; South Korea
- Languages: German; United States; South Korea
- Box office: $1,898,800

Coconut the Little Dragon 2: Into the Jungle (German: Der kleine Drache Kokosnuss - Auf in den Dschungel!; also released worldwide as A Dragon's Tale and A Dragon's Adventure in the UK) is a 2018 German musical adventure comedy film directed by Anthony Power and written by Mark Slater and Gabriele Walther (who also acted as producer). An adaptation of the children's book series of the same name by Ingo Siegner, it is a sequel to the 2014 film Coconut the Little Dragon.

== Premise ==
In an effort to improve dragon harmony, a summer camp is organised to set sail to an island which is believed to be inhabited by Water Dragons. Dragons Coconut and his best friend, Oscar, sail along, and they smuggle their friend Mathilda, a porcupine, in a box. Once they reach the island, they get shipwrecked and the Water Dragons act hostile, leaving them stranded on a desert island.
