= The Dreams of Jinsha =

2010 animated film

- Theatrical release poster

Chinese name
- Traditional Chinese: 梦回金沙城
- Simplified Chinese: 梦回金沙城
Transcriptions
Standard Mandarin
- Hanyu Pinyin: Mèng huí jīnshā chéng
Yue: Cantonese
- Jyutping: mung6 wui4 gam1 sa1 sing4
- Directed by: Chen Deming
- Written by: Xiaohong Su; Wang Fang
- Screenplay by: Xiaohong Su; Wang Fang
- Produced by: Xiaohong Su; Gu Guoqing
- Starring: Zhan Jia; Xu Gang; Cheng Yuzhu; Zhang Xin; Xie Tiantian; Jiang Yuling; Wang Xiaobing; Hu Pingzhi; Wu Lei
- Edited by: Chen Xiaohong
- Music by: Shi Jiayang
- Production companies: Hangzhou C&L Digital Production
- Distributed by: Huaxia Film Distribution Co.
- Release dates: 10 July 2010 (China); 3 December 2010 (United States)
- Running time: 85 minutes
- Country: China
- Language: Mandarin
- Budget: $11 Million (US)
- Box office: $100 million

The Dreams of Jinsha (Chinese: 梦回金沙城; pinyin: Mèng huí jīnshā chéng) is a 2010 animated film released in China. It was directed by Chen Deming and produced by Hangzhou C&L Digital Production. It was China's most expensive animated film ever.

== Plot ==
The plot of this story revolves around the character of Xiao Long, who is whisked back over 3,000 years into the past and ends up in an ancient kingdom known as Jinsha.

== Cast and characters ==
Character	Voice cast
Princess Hua'er	Zhan Jia
Xiao Long	Xu Gang
Xiao Long's Mother	Cheng Yuzhu
Grandma	Zhang Xin
King of Jinsha	Xie Tiantian
Maid	Jiang Yuling
General	Wang Xiaobing
Minister	Hu Pingzhi
The Elephant God	Wu Lei

== Accolades ==
The film was shortlisted for the 2011 Oscar nomination for Best Animated Feature.
