= Happy Little Submarine: 20000 Leagues under the Sea =

- Directed by: Shen Yu
- Screenplay by: Cindy McKay; Liu Qiling; Xia Tianran; Lin Gaofeng
- Production companies: Shenzhen Global Digital Film and Television Culture Co. Ltd.
- Release date: 1 June 2018
- Running time: 75 minutes
- Country: China
- Language: Mandarin
- Box office: CN¥72.616 million

Happy Little Submarine: 20000 Leagues under the Sea (Chinese: 潜艇总动员：海底两万里) is a 2018 Chinese computer-animated adventure film directed by Shen Yu from a screenplay by Cindy McKay, Liu Qiling, Xia Tianran and Lin Gaofeng. It is the sixth film in the Happy Little Submarine film series, following Happy Little Submarine Magic Box of Time (2015). Released in China on 1 June 2018, the filmed grossed CN¥72.616 million.

== Premise ==
Ali, Beibe and Meisha, submarines, have befriended a group of adorable sea creatures at the bottom of the ocean. After they tell Ali about a frightening legend of a mysterious sea monster that supposedly disrupted the ecological balance of the ocean, he leads an expedition team with Beibe and Meisha to find the creature and return the balance.

== Voice cast ==
The submarine characters are:

- Fan Churong as Ali, a courageous submarine who leads the expedition to find the sea monster
- Hong Haitian as Babe, who accompanies Ali on the expedition
- Li Ye as Bobo, Ali's best friend who accidentally gets into the expedition with Ali and Babe

== Release and box office ==
20000 Leagues under the Sea was released in China on 1 June 2018, opening with CN¥32.450 million for an opening week gross of CN¥59.207 million. By the end of its theatrical run, the film had grossed CN¥72.616 million. The film was also released in South Korea on 9 June 2019, where it grossed $318,567.

Critically, the film received positive reviews, with particular praise aimed towards its strong environmental and ecological messages, plot and characters. However, on Douban, the aggregated user rating score for the film is 4.0 out of 10.
