= List of animated feature films of 2016 =

This is a list of animated feature films that were released in 2016.

== List ==
Animated feature films of 2016
Title	Country	Director	Production company	Animation technique	Notes	Type	Release date	Duration
Accel World: Infinite Burst	Japan	Masakazu Obara	Sunrise	Traditional			July 23, 2016	82 minutes
Ajin Part 2: Shōtotsu	Japan	Hiroaki Ando	Polygon Pictures	Computer			May 6, 2016	106 minutes
Ajin Part 3: Shōgeki	Japan	Hiroaki Ando	Polygon Pictures	Computer			September 23, 2016	121 minutes
Albert	United States	Max Lang	Nickelodeon Animation Studios	Computer			December 9, 2016	43 minutes
Alice Through the Looking Glass	United States	James Bobin	Walt Disney Pictures; Roth Films; Team Todd; Tim Burton Productions	Computer / Live action			May 10, 2016 (London); May 27, 2016	113 minutes
Alpha and Omega: Dino Digs	United States; Canada	Tim Maltby	Lionsgate; Crest Animation Productions	Computer		Direct-to-video	May 10, 2016	47 minutes
Alpha and Omega: The Big Fureeze	United States	Tim Maltby	Lionsgate; Crest Animation Productions	Computer		Direct-to-video	November 8, 2016	47 minutes
Anpanman: Nanda and Runda from the Star of Toys それいけ!アンパンマン おもちゃの星のナンダとルンダ	Japan	Jun Kawagoe	Anpanman Production Committee; TMS Entertainment	Traditional			July 2, 2016	62 minutes
The Angry Birds Movie	United States; Finland	Clay Kaytis; Fergal Reilly	Rovio Animation	Computer			May 7, 2016 (Los Angeles); May 13, 2016 (Finland); May 20, 2016 (United States and New York City)	97 minutes
The Ape Story	China	Liu Pan		Computer			January 24, 2016	
Ballerina; Leap!	France; Canada	Éric Summer; Eric Warin	L'Atelier Animation	Computer			October 19, 2016 (Paris); December 14, 2016 (France); February 24, 2017 (Canada)	89 minutes
Bamse and the Witch's Daughter; Bamse och häxans dotter	Sweden; Hungary; Germany; Taiwan	Christian Ryltenius; Maria Blom	SF Studios; Tre Vänner	Traditional			December 25, 2016	65 minutes
Barbie: Spy Squad	United States	Conrad Helten	Universal Studios; Arc Productions; Rainmaker Studios	Computer			January 15, 2016 (DVD); March 20, 2016 (Nickelodeon)	75 minutes
Barbie: Star Light Adventure	United States; Canada	Andrew Tan	Arc Productions; Mattel Creations	Computer			July 30, 2016 (theatrical); August 29, 2016 (home video); October 2, 2016 (television)	79 minutes
Barbie & Her Sisters in A Puppy Chase	United States	Conrad Helten	Universal Studios; Arc Productions; Rainmaker Studios	Computer			October 18, 2016 (DVD); November 13, 2016 (Nickelodeon)	75 minutes
Big Fish & Begonia	China	Liang Xuan; Zhang Chun	Beijing Enlight Media; B&T Studio	Traditional / Computer			July 8, 2016	105 minutes
Bling	South Korea; United States	Kyung Ho Lee; Wonjae Lee	Momentum Pictures; Digiart Productions; Digital Idea	Computer			March 3, 2016	82 minutes
Batman: Bad Blood	United States	Jay Oliva	Warner Bros. Animation; DC Entertainment; The Answer Studio (animation services)	Traditional			January 20, 2016 (digital); February 2, 2016 (physical)	72 minutes
Batman: The Killing Joke	United States	Sam Liu	Warner Bros. Animation; DC Entertainment; The Answer Studio	Traditional			July 22, 2016 (San Diego Comic-Con) (United States)	77 minutes
Batman: Return of the Caped Crusaders	United States	Rick Morales	Warner Bros. Animation; DC Entertainment	Traditional			October 6, 2016 (NYCC); October 10, 2016 (United States)	78 minutes
Batman Unlimited: Mechs vs. Mutants	United States	Curt Geda	Warner Bros. Animation; DC Entertainment	Traditional			July 24, 2016 (San Diego Comic-Con); August 30, 2016 (Digital); September 13, 2016 (DVD)	72 minutes
The BFG	United States; India	Steven Spielberg	Walt Disney Pictures; Amblin Entertainment; Reliance Entertainment; Walden Media; The Kennedy/Marshall Company; The Roald Dahl Story Company	Computer / Live action			May 14, 2016 (Cannes) July 1, 2016 (United States) July 22, 2016 (United Kingdom)	118 minutes
Bobby the Hedgehog	China	Jianming Huang	Beijing Skywheel Entertainment Co. Daysview Animation	Computer			July 22, 2016	94 minutes
BoBoiBoy: The Movie	Malaysia	Nizam Razak	Animonsta Studios	Computer			March 3, 2016; April 13, 2016 (Indonesia)	100 minutes
Boonie Bears: The Big Top Secret	China	Ding Liang; Lin Yongchang	Shenzhen Huaqiang Shuzi Dongman; You Yang (Tian Jin) Dong Man Culture Media; Le Vision Pictures (Tianjin); Fantawild Holdings; Pearl River Pictures; Dadi Century Films Distribution (Beijing); Tianjin Maoyan Media	Computer			January 16, 2016	96 minutes
Chaar Sahibzaade: Rise of Banda Singh Bahadur	India	Harry Baweja	Baweja Movies; Irealities Technology	Computer			November 11, 2016	134 minutes
Chain Chronicle: Light of Haecceitas	Japan	Masashi Kudō	Telecom Animation Film; Graphinica	Traditional			December 3, 2016 (theatrical release); January 7, 2017	24 minutes
Chhota Bheem Himalayan Adventures	India	Rusauro B. Adorable	Green Gold Animation	Computer			January 8, 2016	97 minutes
Code Geass: Boukoku no Akito Final	Japan	Kazuki Akane	Sunrise	Traditional			February 6, 2016	60 minutes
Crayon Shin-chan: Fast Asleep! Dreaming World Big Assault!	Japan	Wataru Takahashi	Shin-Ei Animation	Traditional			April 16, 2016	96 minutes
DC Super Hero Girls: Hero of the Year	United States	Cecilia Aranovich	Warner Bros. Animation; DC Entertainment; Mattel Playground Productions	Traditional			July 24, 2016 (San Diego Comic-Con); August 9, 2016 (Digital); August 23, 2016 (DVD)	76 minutes
Deity Hunt	China			Computer				85 minutes
Detective Conan: Junkoku no Nightmare	Japan	Kobun Shizuno	TMS Entertainment	Traditional			April 16, 2016	112 minutes
Digimon Adventure tri. Determination	Japan	Keitaro Motonaga	Toei Animation	Traditional			March 12, 2016	84 minutes (Part 2)
Digimon Adventure tri. Confession	Japan	Keitaro Motonaga	Toei Animation	Traditional			September 24, 2016	101 minutes (Part 3)
Dōkyūsei	Japan	Shouko Nakamura	A-1 Pictures	Traditional			February 20, 2016; May 6, 2016 (NA)	60 minutes
Dofus, book 1: Julith	France	Anthony Roux; Jean-Jacques Denis	Ankama Animations	Traditional			November 7, 2015 (Arras Film Festival); November 22, 2015 (Paris International Fantastic Film Festival); February 3, 2016	100 minutes
Doraemon: Nobita and the Birth of Japan 2016	Japan	Shinnosuke Yakuwa	Shin-Ei Animation	Traditional			March 5, 2016	104 minutes
The Dragon Spell	Ukraine	Depoyan Manuk	Panama Grand Prix	Computer			October 13, 2016	85 minutes
Eiga Precure All Stars Minna de Utau♪ Kiseki no Mahō	Japan		Toei Animation	Traditional			March 19, 2016	70 minutes
El Americano: The Movie	United States; Mexico	Ricardo Arnaiz; Mike Kunkel	Animex; Anáhuac Films; Olmos Productions; Phil Roman Entertainment	Computer			January 22, 2016 (Mexico); June 13, 2017 (United States)	87 minutes
The Emperor's New Clothes	China	Li Xia		Computer			January 1, 2016	78 minutes
Ethel & Ernest	United Kingdom; Luxembourg	Roger Mainwood	BBC; Lupus Films; Ethel & Ernest Productions; Melusine Productions; Cloth Cat Animation; BFI; Ffilm Cymru Wales; Film Fund Luxembourg	Traditional			October 15, 2016 (London Film Festival); December 28, 2016	94 minutes
Finding Dory	United States	Andrew Stanton	Pixar Animation Studios	Computer			June 8, 2016 (El Capitan Theatre); June 17, 2016	97 minutes
Friends Forever - A Pig's Tale; Mullewapp – Eine schöne Schweinerei	Germany	Theresa Strozyk	MotionWorks; Melusine Productions	Computer			July 14, 2016	72 minutes
The Frog Kingdom 2: Sub-Zero Mission	China	Chang Guang Xi; Peng Fei		Computer			February 19, 2016	87 minutes
Fruity Robo The Great Escape	China	Wang Wei		Computer			January 24, 2016	81 minutes
Gantz: O	Japan	Yasushi Kawamura	Digital Frontier	Computer			October 14, 2016	96 minutes
Garakowa -Restore the World-	Japan	Masashi Ishihama	A-1 Pictures	Traditional			January 9, 2016	67 minutes
Garo: Divine Flame	Japan	Yuichiro Hayashi	MAPPA	Traditional			May 21, 2016	78 minutes
Gekijōban Aikatsu Stars!	Japan			Traditional			August 13, 2016	59 minutes
Gekijōban Tantei Opera Milky Holmes ~Gyakushū no Milky Holmes~	Japan	Hiroaki Sakurai	J.C. Staff	Traditional			February 27, 2016	70 minutes
Gekijoban Shimajiro no Wao! Shimajiro to Ehon no Kuni	Japan	Isamu Hirabayashi	Benesse	Traditional / Live action			March 11, 2016	61 minutes
Get Santa; Den magiske juleæske	Sweden; Denmark	Jacob Ley	Copenhagen Bombay	Stop motion			November 10, 2016	90 minutes
The Girl Without Hands; La Jeune Fille sans mains	France	Sébastien Laudenbach	Les Films Sauvages; Les Films Pelléas	Traditional			May 12, 2016 (Cannes); December 14, 2016	76 minutes
Godbeast Megazord: Return of Green Dragon	China	Zhu Xiaobing; Huang Yiqing	Pearl River Film Group; Guangzhou Dali Animation; Beijing KAKU Cartoon Satellite TV; Pearl River Pictures	Computer			September 15, 2016	87 minutes
Hitler's Folly	United States	Bill Plympton	Plymptoons	Mockumentary			June 3, 2016	67 minutes
Hood's Mad Animals; Бременские разбойники	Russia	Aleksey Lukyanchikov	Central Partnership; Star Media Film	Traditional			November 10, 2016	73 minutes
Howard Lovecraft and the Frozen Kingdom	Canada	Sean Patrick O'Reilly	Arcana Studio	Computer			October 3, 2016	83 minutes
I Am Nezha	China	Shu Zhan		Computer			October 1, 2016	83 minutes
Ice Age: Collision Course	United States	Mike Thurmeier; Galen T. Chu	Blue Sky Studios	Computer			June 19, 2016 (Sydney Film Festival); July 22, 2016	91 minutes
In the Forest of Huckybucky; Dyrene i Hakkebakkeskogen	Norway	Rasmus A. Sivertsen	Qvisten Animation	Stop motion			December 25, 2016	75 minutes
In This Corner of the World; Kono Sekai no Katasumi ni	Japan	Sunao Katabuchi	MAPPA	Traditional			October 28, 2016 (TIFF); November 12, 2016; December 20, 2019 (extended version)	129 minutes (original version); 168 minutes (extended version)
Ivan Tsarévitch et la Princesse Changeante	France	Michel Ocelot	Canal+ Nord-Ouest Films; Studio O				September 28, 2016	57 minutes
Izzie's Way Home	United States	Sasha Burrow	The Asylum	Computer			May 17, 2016	75 minutes
Justice League vs. Teen Titans	United States	Sam Liu	Warner Bros. Animation; DC Entertainment; MOI Animation (animation services)	Traditional			March 26, 2016 (WonderCon); March 29, 2016 (United States)	79 minutes
The Jungle Book	United States	Jon Favreau	Walt Disney Pictures; Fairview Entertainment	Computer / Live action			April 15, 2016	106 minutes
Jak uratować mamę	Poland	Daniel Zduńczyk, Marcin Męczkowski	Virtual Magic	Traditional / Computer			June 5, 2016	86 minutes
Kabaneri of the Iron Fortress Recap 1: Gathering Light	Japan	Tetsurō Araki	Wit Studio	Traditional			December 31, 2016 (part 1)	107 minutes (part 1)
KanColle: The Movie	Japan	Keizō Kusakawa	Diomedéa	Traditional			November 26, 2016	95 minutes
Kikoriki: Legend of the Golden Dragon; Смешарики. Легенда о золотом драконе	Russia	Denis Chernov	Petersburg Animation Studio	Computer			March 17, 2016	80 minutes
King of Prism by PrettyRhythm	Japan	Masakazu Hishida	Tatsunoko Production	Traditional			January 9, 2016	60 minutes
Kingsglaive: Final Fantasy XV	Japan	Takeshi Nozue	Visual Works; Digic Pictures; Image Engine; Marza Animation Planet	Computer			July 9, 2016	110 minutes
Kin-iro Mosaic: Pretty Days	Japan	Tensho	Studio Gokumi; AXsiZ	Traditional			November 12, 2016	50 minutes
Kizumonogatari Part 1: Tekketsu	Japan	Tatsuya Oishi	Shaft	Traditional			January 8, 2016	64 minutes
Kizumonogatari II: Nekketsu-hen	Japan	Tatsuya Oishi	Shaft	Traditional			August 19, 2016	69 minutes
Kubo and the Two Strings	United States	Travis Knight	Laika	Stop motion / Computer			August 13, 2016 (MIFF); August 19, 2016	102 minutes
Kung Fu Panda 3	United States; China	Jennifer Yuh Nelson; Alessandro Carloni	DreamWorks Animation; China Film Co., Ltd. Oriental DreamWorks; Zhong Ming You Ying Film	Computer			January 23, 2016 (China); March 25, 2016	95 minutes
Kunta 2	China	Lian Li					January 1, 2016	
The Land Before Time XIV: Journey of the Brave	United States	Davis Doi	Universal Animation Studios; Universal 1440 Entertainment	Traditional			February 2, 2016	82 minutes
La Leyenda del Chupacabras	Mexico	Alberto Rodriguez	Ánima Estudios	Traditional			October 21, 2016	82 minutes
The Legend of Shankhadhar	Nepal	Sanyukta Shrestha	Yantrakala Studios Pvt Ltd	Flash			December 17, 2016	55 Minutes
Lego DC Comics Super Heroes: Justice League – Cosmic Clash	United States	Rick Morales	Warner Bros. Animation; DC Entertainment	Computer			February 9, 2016 (Digital); March 1, 2016 (Blu-ray and DVD)	78 minutes
Lego DC Comics Super Heroes: Justice League – Gotham City Breakout	United States	Matt Peters; Melchior Zwyer	Warner Bros. Animation; LEGO; DC Entertainment	Computer			June 21, 2016 (Digital); July 12, 2016 (DVD and Blu-ray)	78 minutes
Lego Scooby-Doo! Haunted Hollywood	United States	Rick Morales	Warner Bros. Animation; The Lego Group	Computer			May 10, 2016	75 minutes
Little Door Gods	China	Gary Wang	Light Chaser Animation Studios	Computer			December 25, 2015	107 minutes 86 minutes (United States Version)
Lost in the Moonlight 달빛궁궐 (Dal-bit-gung-gwol)	South Korea	Hyun-Joo Kim	Studio Holhory co Seok-joon	Traditional			September 7, 2016	80 minutes
Louise by the Shore; Louise en hiver	France	Jean-François Laguionie	JPL films	Traditional / Computer			June 15, 2016 (Annecy); November 23, 2016	75 minutes
McDull: Rise of the Rice Cooker	China; Hong Kong	Brian Tse	Sunwah Media	Computer			September 15, 2016	90 minutes
Moana	United States	Ron Clements; John Musker	Walt Disney Animation Studios	Computer			November 14, 2016 (AFI Fest); November 23, 2016	107 minutes
Monster Strike The Movie	Japan	Shinpei Ezaki	Liden Films; Ultra Super Pictures; XFlag Pictures	Traditional			December 10, 2016	103 minutes
Monster Trucks	United States	Chris Wedge	Paramount Animation; Nickelodeon Movies; Disruption Entertainment	Computer / Live action			December 21, 2016	105 minutes
Motu Patlu: King Of Kings	India	Suhas D. Kadav	Viacom 18 Motion Pictures; Cosmos Entertainment; Maya Digital Studios	Computer			October 19, 2016	110 minutes
Mr. Nian	China	Yang Zhang	Tianjin Maoyan Media	Computer			February 8, 2016	97 minutes
My Dogs, JinJin & Akida 우리집 멍멍이 진진과 아키다 (U-li-jip Meong-meong-i Jin-jin-gwa A-ki-da)	South Korea	Jong-Duck Cho	Korean Academy of Film Arts	Traditional			October 22, 2016 (Bucheon International Animation Festival)	67 minutes
My Entire High School Sinking Into the Sea	United States	Dash Shaw	Washington Square Films; Electric Chinoland; Low Spark Films	Traditional			September 11, 2016 (TIFF); April 14, 2017	75 minutes
My Life as a Zucchini; Ma vie de Courgette	France; Switzerland	Claude Barras	Gebeka Films; Blue Spirit Productions	Stop motion			May 15, 2016 (Cannes); September 22, 2016 (Switzerland); October 19, 2016 (France)	65 minutes
My Little Pony: Equestria Girls – Legend of Everfree	Canada; United States	Ishi Rudell; Katrina Hadley	Hasbro Studios; DHX Media	Flash	Television film		September 24, 2016 (Discovery Kids Latin America); October 1, 2016 (Netflix in the United States and Canada)	73 minutes
Naze Ikiru: Rennyo Shounin to Yoshizaki Enjou	Japan	Hideaki Ōba		Traditional			May 21, 2016	86 minutes
Nerdland	United States	Chris Prynoski	Titmouse, Inc.	Flash			April 14, 2016 (Tribeca Film Festival); December 6, 2016	83 minutes
New Happy Dad and Son 2: The Instant Genius	China	He Cheng	Luming Pictures; Zhong Yang Television Station Yang Shi Dong Hua; China Radio, Film & TV Programs Exchanging Center; Beijing E Xi E Entertainment Production; Xi'an Qujiang Film&TV Investment Group; Heyi Information Technology (Beijing); China Film Group Corporation; Beijing E Xi E Entertainment Production; Wuzhou Film Distribution; Eastern Mordor; Sihai Distribution Association; Beijing Weiying Shidai Technology; Tianjin Maoyan Media; Xi'an Qujiang Film&TV Investment Group	Computer			August 19, 2016	85 minutes
Norm of the North	United States; India	Trevor Wall	Assemblage Entertainment; Splash Entertainment; Telegael	Computer			January 15, 2016 (United States); March 18, 2016 (Ireland)	88 minutes
Nova Seed	Japan; Canada	Nick DiLiberto	Gorgon Pictures; House of Cool	Traditional			April 23, 2016 (Toronto Animation Arts Festival International)	64 minutes
The Oddsockeaters; Lichozrouti	Czech Republic; Slovakia; Croatia	Galina Miklínová	T.H.A.	Computer			October 20, 2016	83 minutes
Omnivirtuous Srimanta Sankardeva	India	Manju Borah	AM Television	Computer			November 11, 2016	140 minutes
One Piece Film: Gold	Japan	Hiroaki Miyamoto	Toei Animation	Traditional			July 15, 2016 (Emirates Palace); July 23, 2016	120 minutes
Orange: Future	Japan	Naomi Nakayama; Hiroshi Hamasaki	Telecom Animation Film; TMS Entertainment	Traditional			November 18, 2016	63 minutes
Ozzy	Spain; Canada	Alberto Rodríguez; Nacho La Casa	Arcadia Motion Pictures; Tangent Animation	Computer			October 14, 2016	90 minutes
Pete's Dragon	United States	David Lowery	Walt Disney Pictures; Whitaker Entertainment	Computer / Live action			August 12, 2016	103 minutes
Persona 3 The Movie: No. 4, Winter of Rebirth	Japan	Tomohisa Taguchi	A-1 Pictures	Traditional			January 23, 2016	105 minutes
Pokémon the Movie: Volcanion and the Mechanical Marvel	Japan	Kunihiko Yuyama	OLM	Traditional			July 16, 2016	95 minutes
Pop In Q	Japan	Naoki Miyahara	Toei Animation	Traditional			December 23, 2016	95 minutes
PriPara Mi~nna no Akogare Let's Go PriPari	Japan	Makoto Moriwaki	Tatsunoko Production	Traditional			March 12, 2016	60 minutes
Quackerz; Крякнутые каникулы	Russia	Victor Lakeshow	Asymmetric VFX Studio; ROME Animation & Film Studio	Computer			February 14, 2016	81 minutes
Ratchet & Clank	United States; Canada	Kevin Munroe, Jericca Cleland	Rainmaker Entertainment; Blockade Entertainment; PlayStation Originals; CNHK Media China; Film Financial Services; Original Force; Insomniac Games	Computer			April 29, 2016	94 minutes
The Red Turtle	Japan; France	Michaël Dudok de Wit	Studio Ghibli; Wild Bunch; Prima Linea Productions; Why Not Productions; Arte France Cinéma; CN4 Productions; Belvision	Traditional			May 18, 2016 (Cannes); June 29, 2016 (France); September 17, 2016 (Japan)	80 minutes
Revengeance	United States	Bill Plympton; Jim Lujan	Plymptoons	Traditional			September 15, 2016 (L'Étrange Festival, Paris, France)	76 minutes
Robinson Crusoe; The Wild Life	Belgium; France	Vincent Kesteloot; Ben Stassen	StudioCanal nWave Pictures; Illuminata Pictures	Computer			February 5, 2016 (Brussels Animation Film Festival); March 30, 2016 (Belgium); April 20, 2016 (France)	90 minutes
Rock Dog	United States; China	Ash Brannon	Summit Premiere; H. Brothers; Mandoo Pictures; H. Brothers Entertainment; Eracme Entertainment; Dream Factory Group; Reel FX Animation Studios	Computer			June 15, 2016 (SIFF); July 8, 2016 (China); February 24, 2017 (United States)	80 minutes
Rudolf the Black Cat; Rudorufu to Ippaiattena	Japan	Kunihiko Yuyama; Mikinori Sakakibara	Sprite Animation Studios; OLM, Inc. OLM Digital	Computer			August 6, 2016	90 minutes
Sausage Party	United States; Canada	Greg Tiernan; Conrad Vernon	Annapurna Pictures; Point Grey Pictures	Computer			March 14, 2016 (SXSW); August 12, 2016	89 minutes
Saving Sally	Philippines	Avid Liongoren	Rocketsheep Studios	Flash / Traditional / Live action			December 25, 2016	94 minutes
Scooby-Doo! and WWE: Curse of the Speed Demon	United States	Tim Divar	Warner Bros. Animation; WWE Studios	Traditional			July 23, 2016 (San Diego Comic-Con); July 26, 2016 (Digital); August 9, 2016 (DVD & Blu-ray)	82 minutes
The Secret Life of Pets	United States	Chris Renaud	Illumination Entertainment	Computer			June 16, 2016 (AIAFF); July 8, 2016	86 minutes
The Secret Princess	United Kingdom	Segun Williams	Transtales Entertainment	Computer			February 14, 2016	94 minutes
Selector Destructed WIXOSS	Japan	Takuya Satō	J.C. Staff	Traditional			February 13, 2016	91 minutes
Seoul Station	South Korea	Yeon Sang-ho	Traditional / Computer				August 18, 2016	92 minutes
Sheep and Wolves; Волки и овцы: бееезумное превращение	Russia	Andrey Galat; Maksim Volkov	Wizart Animation; CTB Film Company	Computer			April 28, 2016	85 minutes
Shimajiro In Bookland	Japan	Isamu Hirabayashi	Benesse; The Answer Studio	Traditional / Live action			March 11, 2016	61 minutes
Shinjuku	United States	Robert Valley	Twistory Studios; Picture Rock	Traditional			2013	12 minutes
A Silent Voice	Japan	Naoko Yamada	Kyoto Animation	Traditional			September 17, 2016	130 minutes
Sinbad: Pirates of the Seven Storms	Russia	Vlad Barbe	CTB Film Company	Traditional			October 27, 2016	74 minutes
Sing	United States	Garth Jennings	Illumination Entertainment	Computer			September 11, 2016 (TIFF); December 21, 2016	108 minutes
Smart	United States; China	John A. Davis	Xing Xing Digital; Pelagius Entertainment					
The Snow Queen 3: Fire and Ice; Снежная королева 3: Огонь и лёд	Russia	Aleksey Tsitsilin	Wizart Animation; 3Beep	Computer			December 29, 2016	89 minutes
Sound! Euphonium: The Movie – Welcome to the Kitauji High School Concert Band	Japan	Tatsuya Ishihara	Kyoto Animation	Traditional			April 23, 2016	103 minutes
Spark	United States; Canada; South Korea	Aaron Woodley	RedRover; ToonBox Entertainment; Hoongman Technology; Gulfstream Pictures; Suning Universal Media	Computer			April 22, 2016 (TAAFI); April 14, 2017 (United States); April 28, 2017 (Canada)	90 minutes
Storks	United States	Doug Sweetland; Nicholas Stoller	Warner Animation Group; RatPac-Dune Entertainment; Stoller Global Solutions	Computer			September 17, 2016 (Regency Village Theater); September 23, 2016	87 minutes
Suki ni Naru Sono Shunkan o: Kokuhaku Jikkō Iinkai	Japan	Tetsuya Yanagisawa	Qualia Animation	Traditional			December 17, 2016	63 minutes
The Swan Princess: Princess Tomorrow, Pirate Today	United States; India	Richard Rich	Lionsgate; Crest Animation Productions	Computer		Direct-to-video	September 6, 2016	81 minutes
Tamayura 4	Japan	Jun'ichi Satô	TYO Animations	Traditional			April 2, 2016	58 minutes
The Tayo Movie: Missing: Ace	South Korea	Kim, Min-sung	Iconix Entertainment; EBS; Kl; Studio Gale	Computer			January 21, 2016	47 minutes
Ted Sieger's Molly Monster	Switzerland; Germany; Sweden	Matthias Bruhn; Michael Ekbladh; Ted Sieger	Alexandra Schatz Filmproduktion; Little Monster; Sluggerfilm; TrickStudio Lutterbeck	Traditional			February 15, 2016 (Berlinale); September 8, 2016 (Germany)	72 minutes
Teenage Mutant Ninja Turtles: Out of the Shadows	United States	Dave Green	Paramount Pictures; Nickelodeon Movies; Platinum Dunes; Gama Entertainment; Mednick Productions; Smithrowe Entertainment	Computer / Live action			June 3, 2016	112 minutes
Throne of Elves	China	Yuefeng Song	Beijing Enlight Pictures	Computer			August 19, 2016	104 minutes
Tom and Jerry: Back to Oz	United States	Spike Brandt; Tony Cervone	Warner Bros. Animation; Turner Entertainment; Hanna-Barbera	Traditional			June 21, 2016	81 minutes
Trolls	United States	Mike Mitchell	DreamWorks Animation	Computer			October 8, 2016 (BFI London Film Festival); November 4, 2016	93 minutes
Upin & Ipin: Jeng Jeng Jeng!	Malaysia	Ainon Ariff; Erma Fatima	Les' Copaque Production; KRU Studios; MNC Pictures	Computer / Live action			November 24, 2016	97 minutes
Woozle & Pip in Search of the Scallywagger! Woezel & Pip Op zoek naar de Sloddervos!	Netherlands	Patrick Raats	TDMP; Dreamchaser Europe; Source Investments; KRO-NCRV; Il Luster Productions; Anikey Studios	Flash			January 20, 2016	70 minutes
Yo-kai Watch: Sora Tobu Kujira to Double no Sekai no Daibōken da Nyan!	Japan	Shigeharu Takahashi; Shinji Ushiro	OLM, Inc.	Computer / Live action			December 17, 2016	90 minutes
Your name. Kimi no Na wa	Japan	Makoto Shinkai	CoMix Wave Films	Traditional			July 3, 2016 (Anime Expo); August 26, 2016 (Japan)	107 minutes
Yowamushi Pedal: Spare Bike	Japan	Osamu Nabeshima	TMS/8PAN				September 9, 2016	60 minutes
Yu-Gi-Oh!: The Dark Side of Dimensions	Japan	Satoshi Kuwabara	Studio Gallop	Traditional			April 23, 2016	131 minutes
Yugo & Lala 3	China	Wang Yunfei	Jiangsu Youman Cartoon TV; Beijing Qixinran Entertainment; Cheers Tone; Beijing Qi Cartoon Animation, Eastern Mordor; Sihai Distribution Association; Beijing Weiying Shidai Technology; Gewara; Tao Piao Piao; Tianjin Huayi Brothers Blockbuster Films	Computer			July 29, 2016	82 minutes
Zootopia	United States	Byron Howard; Rich Moore; Jared Bush	Walt Disney Animation Studios	Computer			February 13, 2016 (Belgium); March 4, 2016	108 minutes
Zutto Mae Kara Suki Deshita: Kokuhaku Jikkō Iinkai	Japan	Tetsuya Yanagisawa	Qualia Animation	Traditional			April 23, 2016	63 minutes

== Highest-grossing animated films ==
The following is a list of the 12 highest-grossing animated feature films first released in 2016 as of 1 of August 2017.

Rank	Title	Distributor/Studio	Worldwide gross	Ref
1	Finding Dory	Walt Disney Pictures / Pixar	$1,028,570,889	
2	Zootopia	Walt Disney Pictures / Disney	$1,023,784,195	
3	The Secret Life of Pets	Universal Pictures / Illumination Entertainment	$875,457,937	
4	Moana	Walt Disney Pictures / Disney	$643,331,111	
5	Sing	Universal Pictures / Illumination Entertainment	$634,085,299	
6	Kung Fu Panda 3	20th Century Fox / DreamWorks Animation	$521,170,825	
7	Ice Age: Collision Course	20th Century Fox / Blue Sky Studios	$408,579,038	
8	Your Name	Toho / CoMix Wave Films	$408,335,511	
9	The Angry Birds Movie	Columbia Pictures / Rovio Entertainment	$349,779,543	
10	Trolls	20th Century Fox / DreamWorks Animation	$346,864,462	
11	Storks	Warner Bros. Pictures / Warner Animation Group / RatPac-Dune Entertainment	$183,800,603	
12	Sausage Party	Columbia Pictures / Annapurna Pictures / Point Grey Pictures / Nitrogen Studios	$140,705,322	

Zootopia and Finding Dory became the fourth and fifth animated films after Toy Story 3 (2010), Frozen (2013), and Minions (2015) to gross over $1 billion, and are currently the ninth and eighth highest-grossing animated films of all time and the 42nd and 45th highest-grossing films of all time. Kung Fu Panda 3 passed Monkey King: Hero Is Back to become the highest-grossing animated film of all time in China only to be overtaken by Zootopia. Your Name passed Spirited Away to become the highest-grossing anime film at the time. Zootopia became the highest-grossing original animated film of all time, surpassing Finding Nemo ($940.3 million in 2003). Along with Finding Dory, it became one of two animated films to earn over $1 billion in the same year, a first in cinematic history.

== See also ==
- List of animated television series of 2016
