= Plumíferos =

- Directed by: Daniel DeFelippo; Gustavo Giannini
- Written by: Daniel DeFelippo; Peto Menahem; Diego Reinhold; Claudio Andaur; Gustavo Giannini
- Produced by: Carlos Salvatore
- Starring: Luisana Lopilato; Mariano Martínez; Carla Peterson; Mirta Wons; Luis Machín; Mike Amigorena; Mario Pasik; Fabio Di Tomaso; Esteban Prol
- Music by: Daniel Martin
- Production companies: CS Entertainment; Manos Digitales Animation Studio; 100 Bares Producciones; Telefe
- Distributed by: Sony Pictures Releasing International
- Release date: February 18, 2010
- Running time: 80 minutes
- Country: Argentina
- Language: Spanish
- Box office: $192,485

Plumíferos is a 2010 Argentine animated adventure comedy film directed by Daniel DeFelippo and Gustavo Giannini. The film was completed in 2009 and released in theaters in Argentina on February 18, 2010.

The film's animation was done by Manos Digitales Animation Studio using Blender and other open source software for all 3D models, animation, lighting and render process under Linux operating systems. Plumíferos is the first feature film to be entirely animated in Blender.

== Voice cast ==
- Luisana Lopilato as Feifi, a canary that escapes from the cage of a network tycoon, Mr. Puertas, and starts trying a new life in freedom as a common bird.
- Mariano Martínez as Juan, a house sparrow that feels ordinary and underestimates his own race. Accidentally, he changes the way he looks, and the same reason that will make him feel unique is what is going to put his life in danger.
- Carla Peterson as Clarita, a bat.
- Mirta Wons as Libia, a rock pigeon. The character is portrayed as a man in the English dub.
- Luis Machín as Sr. Puertas, a network tycoon.
- Peto Menahem as Pipo, a blue-chested hummingbird.

== English version ==
English dub poster

Birds of Paradise is the English dub of Plumíferos. It was released direct-to-video in the United States on 1 April 2014 by Lionsgate Home Entertainment.

=== Voice cast ===
- Drake Bell as Jack
- Keith David as Old Buzzard
- Ken Jeong as Vinnie
- Jon Lovitz as Skeeter
- Jane Lynch as Rosie
- Ashley Tisdale as Aurora

=== Reception ===
Barbara Schultz of Common Sense Media awarded the film three stars out of five.
