= Gustavo Giannini =

Argentine filmmaker (born 1968)

Gustavo Giannini (born 21 July 1968, in Buenos Aires, Argentina) is an Argentine filmmaker known for writing and directing the film 5.5.5, winner of Best Foreign Feature at the 2012 Orlando Film Festival; and for directing Plumiferos, the first CGI feature film made with open source software.
