= Alibaba and the Three Golden Hair =

Chinese animated film

- Chinese: 阿里巴巴三根金发
- Directed by: Jiang Yefeng
- Screenplay by: Liu Fei
- Production companies: Shenzhen Global Digital Film and Television Culture Co. Ltd.
- Release date: 30 December 2018
- Running time: 85 minutes
- Country: China
- Language: Mandarin
- Box office: CN¥10.311 million ($1,615,511)

Alibaba and the Three Golden Hair (Chinese: 阿里巴巴三根金发) is a 2018 Chinese computer-animated adventure comedy film directed by Jiang Yefeng from a screenplay by Liu Fei. A sequel to Alibaba 2: Seal of Solomon (2016), it is the second film in the Alibaba film series. It was released in China on 30 December 2018, and grossed 10.311 million Chinese renminbi ($1,615,511) at the box office.

== Release and box office ==
Alibaba and the Three Golden Hair was released in China on 30 December 2018. In its opening week, it grossed 2.998 million Chinese renminbi ($469,714) at the box office, reaching 10.311 million ($1,615,511) by the end of its theatrical run from 270,800 tickets sold.
