= Little Door Gods =

- Poster
- 小门神
- Directed by: Gary Wang
- Written by: Gary Wang
- Produced by: Yu Zhou
- Starring: Dan Fogler; Edward Norton; Bella Thorne; Nicole Kidman; Mel Brooks; Cristina Pucelli; Steven French
- Edited by: Ji Zhao
- Music by: Nathan Wang
- Production companies: Alibaba Pictures; Light Chaser Animation Studios; The Weinstein Company (co-produced with Mizchief) (International Dub only)
- Distributed by: Alibaba Pictures (China); The Weinstein Company; Netflix (International)
- Release date: January 1, 2016
- Running time: 107 minutes 86 minutes (US Version)
- Country: China
- Language: Mandarin
- Budget: around US$12 million (projected)
- Box office: US$11.9 million

Little Door Gods (simplified Chinese: 小门神; traditional Chinese: 小門神), also known as Door Guardians, or The Guardian Brothers in the US, is a 2016 Chinese animated fantasy comedy film directed and written by Gary Wang, produced by Light Chaser Animation Studios and distributed by Alibaba Pictures. It was originally released in China on January 1, 2016 in the Peachtopia trilogy Tea Pets (2017) and Cats and Peachtopia (2018). An English-language version that is 20 minutes shorter premiered on Netflix on September 1, 2017.

It is the last film to be fully co-produced by The Weinstein Company, following a series of sexual assault cases against its founder, Harvey Weinstein and is also the last film to be re-edited by Harvey Weinstein.

== Plot ==
A long time ago, humans placed posters of Guardian spirits on their doors so the spirits can help them with their problems, The Door Gods Shen Tu and Yu Lei are brothers. In recent years, because people no longer pay attention to the immortals, the divine economy is in a slump, and minor deities such as Door Gods, Earth Gods, and the Eight Immortals are facing the danger of being laid off. Therefore, Yu Lei, the Door God, decided to go to the human world to do something earth-shattering to prove the value of the Door Gods. Yu Lei and Shen Cha came to the human world one after another and met a single mother and her daughter, Xiao Ying and Yu Er, in a small town, and then a series of unexpected things happened.

== Voice cast ==
=== Original Chinese cast ===
- Gao Xiaosong as Shen Tu
- Show Joy as Laohu
- White. K as Yu Lei
- Ji Guanlin as Huaxia (Bloom)
- Cindy Yu as Raindrop
- Bi Xiaolan as Ying
- Quangdu Bingba (向杜炳巴) as Tu
- Seth I as himself

=== English dub cast ===
- Dan Fogler as Shen Tu
- Edward Norton as Yu Lei
- Bella Thorne as Raindrop "Rain"
- Nicole Kidman as Luli
- Mel Brooks as Mr. Rogman
- Meryl Streep as The Narrator
- Steven French as Dean/Colossus
- Cristina Pucelli as Bloom (Huaxia)

== Reception ==
The film earned US$754,000 on its opening weekend and finished with a total gross of US$11.9 million.
