= New Gods: Nezha Reborn =

2021 Chinese animated fantasy action film by Zhao Ji

- Promotional poster
- Chinese: 新神榜：哪吒重生
- Literal meaning: League of New Gods: Nezha Reborn
- Hanyu Pinyin: xīn shén bǎng: Nézhā chóngshēng
- Directed by: Zhao Ji
- Screenplay by: Mu Chuan
- Based on: Investiture of the Gods by Xu Zhonglin and Lu Xixing
- Produced by: Lu Xi
- Music by: Guo Haowei
- Production companies: Light Chaser Animation Studios; Alibaba Pictures; Bona Film Group; Bilibili; Pop Mart
- Distributed by: Taopiaopiao; Bona Film Group; Bilibili; Netflix (International)
- Release dates: February 12, 2021 (China); April 12, 2021 (International)
- Running time: 116 minutes
- Country: China
- Language: Chinese
- Box office: RMB 456 million (US$70 million) (China)

New Gods: Nezha Reborn (Chinese: 新神榜：哪吒重生) is a 2021 Chinese 3D animated fantasy action film directed by Zhao Ji and written by Mu Chuan, based on the character of Nezha from the Ming dynasty novel Investiture of the Gods. In the film, a steampunk and cyberpunk take on the story, Nezha is reincarnated as Li Yunxiang in the fictional city of Donghai (loosely based on 1920s Shanghai) and must settle a 3,000-year-old grudge with the Dragon Clan. New Gods: Yang Jian was released in 2022 as a sequel to this film.

The film was released in mainland China on 12 February 2021 (Chinese New Year). Netflix acquired global rights to the film except in China, and it was released on the platform on 12 April 2021.

New Gods: Nezha Reborn is not related to the 2019 film Ne Zha; they came from different production companies and have different distributors. Both films are loosely based on the same Ming Dynasty novel.

== Plot ==
In the city of Donghai, whose lower-class residents are suffering from a major water shortage, Li Yunxiang, an underground motorbike racer, works as a smuggler against the wishes of his father, while secretly providing his fellow residents with water by causing breaches in water plants. One night, Ao Bing, son of Ao Guang, leader of the De Clan, the syndicate ruling the city, arrogantly chases after Yunxiang and his sister Kasha to claim his bike. Left wounded and with Kasha injured, Yunxiang's inner fury unleashes a mysterious power that burns Ao Bing's arm, forcing them to flee.

At a hospital, where a woman he met at one of his races, Su Junzhu, works, Yunxiang awakens to discover his wounds healed and, following the previous night's incident, Kasha having lost her right leg. When Ao Guang appears and personally apologizes to Yunxiang and his brother Jinxuang for his son's actions, even returning his bike and offering a generous amount of money, an embittered Yunxiang rejects it. Recognizing his power, Ao Guang sends his forces to kill Yunxiang, running Jinxuang off the road in the process, while Yunxiang defeats the assassins with his powers.

Yunxiang is rescued by a mysterious masked man, who reveals to him that he is the reincarnation of Nezha. Confused, Yunxiang leaves. Meanwhile, Ao Guang reveals to his son of Yunxiang's true identity and that Ao Bing's past life was nearly killed by Nezha before a steel spine was built to help him survive, spurring Ao Bing to swear his revenge against Nezha. Ao Guang then visits the masked man and offers him a sum of money to kill Yunxiang, which he refuses.

Back at the hospital, seeing his new abilities difficult to control, Yunxiang returns to the masked man, who, in exchange for a brand-new bike, trains him to control his powers; as he learns to master his skills, he creates special armor to control the flames and builds Kasha a prosthesis. During a practice fight, Yunxiang discovers the masked man's identity as the Six-Eared Macaque, while learning more about Nezha's primordial spirit within him. While at the hospital, Ao Guang's right-hand, a frog demon, attacks, but is swiftly defeated by Yunxiang.

However, Liang, one of Yunxiang's former coworkers who envies his newfound power is tipped off by Ao Guang to sabotage his armor. He kills Yunxiang's friend Six and targets Kasha to cover it up, who escapes before the hospital is bombed by more De Clan assassins. Yunxiang dispatches them before being attacked by a one-armed warrioress, Rosy Cloud, although he forces her to flee. Upon returning to the hospital, he finds his father wounded in the aftermath, who apologizes to Yunxiang before succumbing to his wounds. Aggrieved and angered, Yunxiang departs for the De Clan base.

At the De family mansion, the Macaque arrives for a personal discussion with Ao Guang, discovering creatures enslaved by him that have drawn all the city's water before Yunxiang arrives, killing his forces before battling Ao Bing; he transforms into his dragon form, but Yunxiang defeats him by ripping off his metallic spine. Rosy then attempts to strike Yunxiang down, but the Macaque intervenes and restrains her, revealing her as the disciple of the Demoness Shiji. Rosy bitterly explains she seeks revenge against Nezha for him killing a dear friend of hers as an act of amusement. Yunxiang then discovers Nezha's past, where, after killing Ao Bing's previous life, the Dragon King of the East Sea demanded an apology, lest he drowned the entire city. Arrogantly refusing, Nezha killed himself. Disillusioned by this revelation, Yunxiang lets Rosy go.

As Yunxiang lays in shock, the Macaque reveals that he himself is Sun Wukong, the Monkey King. He reveals that Ao Guang's undersea palace holds the city's water, as well as the river dragons living within it being restrained to create an item that he needs to grow in power, a Dragon Pearl. Discouraged, Yunxiang then mourns his father at his grave, but inspiration from Su and Kasha invigorates him, and he heads toward Ao Guang's palace.

Upon infiltrating the palace, Yunxiang attempts to free the lion-like creatures under Ao Guang's enslavement, but Ao Guang intervenes, while having kidnapped Su to distract him. Though he struggles, Yunxiang kills Rosy and overpowers Ao Guang, though he returns in his dragon form, swallowing the Dragon Pearl to force the river dragons to wash the city away in a massive tsunami. Yunxiang attempts to stop the dragons by using the Sky Ribbon, but it breaks, allowing the dragons to scatter. Ao Guang attempts to finish Yunxiang off, but Yunxiang harnesses Nezha's power to kill him, at the cost of his own life.

The dying Yunxiang pleads with Nezha to save the city, and the primordial spirit revives him, unifying them as they use the Sky Ribbon to redirect the dragons from the city, stopping the tsunami. Afterward, Yunxiang settles back into his life, accepting his role as a hero.

== Voice cast ==
Li Yunxiang/Nezha
Voiced by: Yang Tianxiang (Mandarin), Stephen Fu (English)

- He is a smuggler and courier and current reincarnation of Nezha.

The Masked Man
Voiced by: Zhang He (Mandarin), Jason Ko (English)

- A masked monkey who is believed to be the Six-Eared Macaque, but in reality, he is Sun Wukong the Monkey King. He is based on the Monkey King, Sun Wukong, from Journey to the West.

Ao Guang De
Voiced by: Xuan Xiaoming (Mandarin), Andrew Kishino (English)

- He is the leader of the De Clan whose true identity is the Dragon King of the East Sea.

Su Junzhu
Voiced by: Li Shimeng (Mandarin), Nicole Fong (English)

- She is a doctor from Ciji Hospital who enjoys competitive motorbike racing. She is also Yunxiang's love interest.

Kasha
Voiced by: Zhu Ke'er (Mandarin), Victoria Grace (English)

- Yunxiang's childhood friend and a lounge singer.

Ao Bing De
Voiced by: King Zhenhe (Mandarin), Jonny Siew (English)

- The son of Ao Guang and the Dragon Prince who was defeated by Nezha in the past. He controls ice-based powers.

Li Jinxiang
Voiced by: Guo Haoran (Mandarin), Harrison Xu (English)

- Yunxiang's older brother. He supports his brother's job as a courier despite their father's wishes.

Donghai Yaksha
Voiced by: Gao Zengzhi (Mandarin), Ping Wu (English)

- Ao Guang's assistant and a frog demon.

Ms. San
Voiced by: Kim Mai Guest (English)

- A proud and very rich woman.

== Production ==
New Gods: Nezha Reborn expands on the original story of Nezha from the Ming Dynasty novel Investiture of the Gods. It was directed by Zhao Ji and produced by Light Chaser Animation Studios, and it took four years to produce. Zhao Ji and Light Chaser previously collaborated on the 2019 film White Snake, which features some of the same cast and crew.

The cyberpunk city of Donghai was designed based on a mixture of Manhattan in the 1920s and '30s and Republic of China–era Shanghai, according to Zhao.

== Release ==
The film was originally scheduled for a summer 2020 release, but was delayed. In 2020 it was presented as a "work in progress" at the Annecy International Animation Film Festival and released a promotional video. In August 2020, its first official trailer was released. On 10 October 2020, a promotional poster was released and the film's release was announced for 12 February 2021 (Chinese New Year). It was screened at IMAX theaters in China on 6 February 2021, with a second round of screenings on 9 February.

In its opening weekend, the film grossed US$21.3 million.

Netflix has acquired streaming rights for the film outside of mainland China, and it was released on the platform on 12 April 2021.

== Reception ==
Critic Lim Yian Yu called the film "an interesting take" on the classic novel, and said it was "definitely a family-friendly movie that can be enjoyed by children and adults alike".

Sun Jiayin praised the decision to bring the character of Nezha into a setting 3,000 years after the original story, saying that this made the film distinct from the plethora of other Investiture of the Gods adaptations out there.

== Sequel ==
A prequel, New Gods: Yang Jian, was released in 2022.
