= List of highest-grossing animated films of the 2010s =

The following are lists of the highest-grossing animated feature films first released in the 2010s.

== Highest-grossing animated films of the 2010s ==
Figures are given in US dollars. DreamWorks Animation is the most represented studio with 12 films on the list, while Pixar has the highest total of any animation studio in this decade, and is the most represented studio with four films in the Top 10. Distributors listed are for the original theatrical release.

Top 50
Rank	Title	Country	Studio	Distributor	Worldwide gross	Year	Ref
1	The Lion King	U.S.	Walt Disney Pictures/Fairview Entertainment/Moving Picture Company	Walt Disney Studios Motion Pictures	$1,656,943,394	2019	
2	Frozen II	U.S.	Walt Disney Pictures/Walt Disney Animation Studios	Walt Disney Studios Motion Pictures	$1,450,026,933	2019	
3	Frozen	U.S.	Walt Disney Pictures/Walt Disney Animation Studios	Walt Disney Studios Motion Pictures	$1,290,000,000	2013	
4	Incredibles 2	U.S.	Pixar Animation Studios	Walt Disney Studios Motion Pictures	$1,242,693,333	2018	
5	Minions	U.S.	Illumination Entertainment	Universal Pictures	$1,159,398,397	2015	
6	Toy Story 4	U.S.	Pixar Animation Studios	Walt Disney Studios Motion Pictures	$1,073,394,593	2019	
7	Toy Story 3	U.S.	Pixar Animation Studios	Walt Disney Studios Motion Pictures	$1,066,969,703	2010	
8	Despicable Me 3	U.S.	Illumination Entertainment	Universal Pictures	$1,034,799,409	2017	
9	Finding Dory	U.S.	Pixar Animation Studios	Walt Disney Studios Motion Pictures	$1,028,570,889	2016	
10	Zootopia	U.S.	Walt Disney Pictures/Walt Disney Animation Studios	Walt Disney Studios Motion Pictures	$1,023,784,195	2016	
11	Despicable Me 2	U.S.	Illumination Entertainment	Universal Pictures	$970,761,885	2013	
12	Ice Age: Continental Drift	U.S.	20th Century Fox Animation/Blue Sky Studios	20th Century Fox	$877,244,782	2012	
13	The Secret Life of Pets	U.S.	Illumination Entertainment	Universal Pictures	$875,457,937	2016	
14	Inside Out	U.S.	Pixar Animation Studios	Walt Disney Studios Motion Pictures	$857,611,174	2015	
15	Coco	U.S.	Pixar Animation Studios	Walt Disney Studios Motion Pictures	$807,082,196	2017	
16	Shrek Forever After	U.S.	DreamWorks Animation	Paramount Pictures	$752,600,867	2010	
17	Madagascar 3: Europe's Most Wanted	U.S.	DreamWorks Animation/PDI	Paramount Pictures	$746,921,274	2012	
18	Monsters University	U.S.	Pixar Animation Studios	Walt Disney Studios Motion Pictures	$744,229,437	2013	
19	Ne Zha	China	Beijing Enlight Media/Chengdu Coco Cartoon Co., Ltd./Horgos Coloroom Pictures/October Media	Beijing Enlight Pictures	$727,268,172	2019	
20	Kung Fu Panda 2	U.S.	DreamWorks Animation	Paramount Pictures	$665,692,281	2011	
21	Big Hero 6	U.S.	Walt Disney Pictures/Walt Disney Animation Studios	Walt Disney Studios Motion Pictures	$657,818,612	2014	
22	Moana	U.S.	Walt Disney Pictures/Walt Disney Animation Studios	Walt Disney Studios Motion Pictures	$643,331,111	2016	
23	Sing	U.S.	Illumination Entertainment	Universal Pictures	$634,151,679	2016	
24	How to Train Your Dragon 2	U.S.	DreamWorks Animation	20th Century Fox	$621,537,519	2014	
25	Tangled	U.S.	Walt Disney Pictures/Walt Disney Animation Studios	Walt Disney Studios Motion Pictures	$591,794,936	2010	
26	The Croods	U.S.	DreamWorks Animation	20th Century Fox	$587,204,668	2013	
27	Cars 2	U.S.	Pixar Animation Studios	Walt Disney Studios Motion Pictures	$562,110,557	2011	
28	Puss in Boots	U.S.	DreamWorks Animation	Paramount Pictures	$554,987,477	2011	
29	Despicable Me	U.S.	Illumination Entertainment	Universal Pictures	$543,113,985	2010	
30	Brave	U.S.	Pixar Animation Studios	Walt Disney Studios Motion Pictures	$540,437,063	2012	
31	Ralph Breaks the Internet	U.S.	Walt Disney Pictures/Walt Disney Animation Studios	Walt Disney Studios Motion Pictures	$529,009,824	2018	
32	Hotel Transylvania 3: Summer Vacation	U.S.	Sony Pictures Animation/Sony Pictures ImageWorks	Columbia Pictures	$528,583,774	2018	
33	The Boss Baby	U.S.	DreamWorks Animation	20th Century Fox	$527,965,936	2017	
34	Kung Fu Panda 3	U.S./China	DreamWorks Animation/Pearl Studio/China Film Co., Ltd.	20th Century Fox	$521,170,825	2016	
35	How to Train Your Dragon: The Hidden World	U.S.	DreamWorks Animation	Universal Pictures	$519,586,035	2019	
36	Dr. Seuss' The Grinch	U.S.	Illumination Entertainment/Dr. Seuss Enterprises	Universal Pictures	$511,565,348	2018	
37	Rio 2	U.S.	20th Century Fox Animation/Blue Sky Studios	20th Century Fox	$500,101,972	2014	
38	How to Train Your Dragon	U.S.	DreamWorks Animation	Paramount Pictures	$494,878,759	2010	
39	Rio	U.S.	20th Century Fox Animation/Blue Sky Studios	20th Century Fox	$484,635,760	2011	
40	Hotel Transylvania 2	U.S.	Sony Pictures Animation/Sony Pictures Imageworks	Columbia Pictures	$473,226,958	2015	
41	Wreck-It Ralph	U.S.	Walt Disney Pictures/Walt Disney Animation Studios	Walt Disney Studios Motion Pictures	$471,222,889	2012	
42	The Lego Movie	U.S./Australia/Denmark	Lego System A/S/Animal Logic/Village Roadshow Pictures	Warner Bros.	$469,160,692	2014	
43	The Secret Life of Pets 2	U.S.	Illumination Entertainment	Universal Pictures	$430,051,293	2019	
44	Ice Age: Collision Course	U.S.	20th Century Fox Animation/Blue Sky Studios	20th Century Fox	$408,579,038	2016	
45	Home	U.S.	DreamWorks Animation	20th Century Fox	$386,041,607	2015	
46	Spider-Man: Into The Spider-Verse	U.S.	Sony Pictures Animation/Sony Pictures Imageworks/Marvel Studios/Pascal Pictures	Columbia Pictures	$384,298,736	2018	
47	Cars 3	U.S.	Pixar Animation Studios	Walt Disney Studios Motion Pictures	$383,930,656	2017	
48	The Adventures of Tintin^{CP}	U.S.	Nickelodeon Movies/Amblin Entertainment/Weta Digital	Paramount Pictures^{CP}	$373,993,951	2011	
49	Penguins of Madagascar	U.S.	DreamWorks Animation/PDI	20th Century Fox	$373,015,621	2014	
50	Your Name	Japan	CoMix Wave Films	Toho Co., Ltd.	$359,889,749	2016	

== Highest-grossing film by year ==
Year	Title	Studio	Worldwide gross	Budget	Ref(s)
2010	Toy Story 3	Disney/Pixar	$1,066,969,703	$200,000,000	
2011	Kung Fu Panda 2	Paramount/DreamWorks Animation	$665,692,281	$150,000,000	
2012	Ice Age: Continental Drift	20th/Blue Sky Studios	$877,244,782	$95,000,000	
2013	Frozen	Disney/Walt Disney Animation Studios	$1,290,000,000 ($1,287,000,000)	$150,000,000	
2014	Big Hero 6	Disney/Walt Disney Animation Studios	$657,818,612	$165,000,000	
2015	Minions	Universal/Illumination	$1,159,398,397	$74,000,000	
2016	Finding Dory	Disney/Pixar	$1,028,570,889	$200,000,000	
2017	Despicable Me 3	Universal/Illumination	$1,034,799,409	$80,000,000	
2018	Incredibles 2	Disney/Pixar	$1,242,805,359	$200,000,000	
2019	The Lion King	Disney	$1,656,943,394	$260,000,000	

== See also ==
- List of animated feature films of the 2010s

== Notes ==
- ^{CP} Released along with Columbia Pictures internationally.
