= List of animated feature films of 2017 =

This is a list of animated feature films that were released in 2017.

== List ==
Animated feature films first released in 2017
Title	Country	Director	Production company	Animation technique	Notes	Type	Release date	Duration
Alpha and Omega: Journey to Bear Kingdom	United States; India	Richard Rich	Lionsgate; Crest Animation Productions	Computer			May 9, 2017	44 minutes
Ana and Bruno; Ana y Bruno	Mexico	Carlos Carrera	Altavista Films; Lo Coloco Films; Ítaca Films; Ánima Estudios; Discreet Arts Productions	Computer			June 12, 2017 (Annecy); August 31, 2018	96 minutes
Ancien and the Magic Tablet; Hirune Hime: Shiranai Watashi no Monogatari	Japan	Kenji Kamiyama	Signal.MD	Traditional			March 18, 2017 (Japan); March 18, 2017 (New York International Children's Film Festival); August 16, 2017 (United Kingdom & Ireland); June 1, 2017 (Singapore); July 28, 2017 (Malaysia); August 18, 2017 (United Kingdom)	111 minutes
Anchors Up; Elias og Storegaps Hemmelighet	Norway	Simen Alsvik; Karsten Fullu	Animando; Steamheads Studios	Computer			October 6, 2017	75 minutes
The Angel in the Clock; El ángel en el reloj	Mexico	Miguel Ángel Uriegas	Fotosintesis Media	Traditional / Flash			October 22, 2017 (Morelia Film Festival); May 25, 2018 (Mexico)	91 minutes 80 minutes (South Korea)
Animal Crackers	United States; Spain; China	Scott Christian Sava; Tony Bancroft	Blue Dream Studios; Storyoscopic Films; Odin's Eye Animation; Mayday Movies; Exit Strategy; Beijing Wen Hua Dongrun Investment Co. China Film Group Corporation	Computer			June 12, 2017 (Annecy); July 21, 2018 (China); July 24, 2020 (United States)	105 minutes
Go! Anpanman: Bulbul's Big Treasure Hunt Adventure それいけ!アンパンマン ブルブルの宝探し大冒険!	Japan	Hiroyuki Yano	Anpanman Production Committee; TMS Entertainment	Traditional			July 1, 2017	62 minutes
Baba Yaga. Inception; Баба Яга. Начало	Russia	Vladimir Sakov	Art Pictures Studio; Glukoza Production; Films based on Baba Yaga	Computer; Flash			November 8, 2018	63 minutes
Backkom Bear: Agent 008	China	Li Qingfang	Alpha Pictures; Harbin Pinge Media; Pinngo; RG Animation Studios	Computer			January 13, 2017; May 3, 2017 (South Korea)	86 minutes
Barbaricina History	Russia	Yuriy Mamontov	Slyers Animation Studios	Computer			April 13, 2017	60 minutes
Barbie: Video Game Hero	United States	Conrad Helten & Zeke Norton	Universal Studios; Arc Productions; Rainmaker Studios	Computer			January 31, 2017 (DVD); March 26, 2017 (Nickelodeon)	72 minutes
Barbie: Dolphin Magic	Canada	Conrad Helten	Universal Studios; Arc Productions; Rainmaker Studios	Computer			September 18, 2017 (Netflix)	61 minutes
Batman and Harley Quinn	United States	Sam Liu	Warner Bros. Animation; DC Entertainment	Traditional			July 21, 2017 (San Diego Comic-Con); August 14, 2017	74 minutes
Batman vs. Two-Face	United States	Rick Morales	Warner Bros. Animation; DC Entertainment	Traditional			October 8, 2017 (New York Comic Con); October 10, 2017	72 minutes
Battle of Persian Gulf II	Iran	Farhad Azima	Fatima Zahra Animation Studios	Computer			February 18, 2017	80 minutes
Beasts of Burden	China; New Zealand	Kirby Atkins	China Film Animation; Huhu Studios	Computer				
The Big Bad Fox and Other Tales... Le Grand Méchant Renard et autres contes ...	France	Benjamin Renner; Patrick Imbert	Folivari; Panique! Production	Traditional; Flash animation			June 15, 2017 (Annecy); June 21, 2017 (France)	83 minutes
Birds Like Us; Ptice kao mi	Bosnia and Herzegovina; Turkey; United Kingdom; United States; Qatar	Faruk Šabanović; Amela Ćuhara	Prime Time; Turkish Radio & Television; Autonomous; Fork Films	Computer			May 5, 2017 (Stuttgart); August 16, 2017 (Sarajevo); November 30, 2017 (Doha); October 16, 2018 (Turkey); January 25, 2022 (United States)	84 minutes
Black Butler: Book of the Atlantic	Japan	Noriyuki Abe	A-1 Pictures	Traditional			January 21, 2017	100 minutes
Blame!	Japan	Hiroyuki Seshita	Polygon Pictures	Computer			May 20, 2017	106 minutes
Bob the Builder: Mega Machines	United Kingdom	Chris Parker; James Mason	HIT Entertainment	Computer			May 27, 2017	63 minutes
Boonie Bears: Entangled Worlds	China	Ding Liang	Le vision pictures	Computer			28 January 2017	89 minutes
The Boss Baby	United States	Tom McGrath	DreamWorks Animation	Computer			March 12, 2017 (Miami); March 31, 2017	97 minutes
The Breadwinner	Ireland; Canada; Luxemburg	Nora Twomey	Cartoon Saloon; Aircraft Pictures	Traditional			September 8, 2017 (TIFF); November 17, 2017 (United States)	94 minutes
Bunyan and Babe	United States	Louis Ross	Exodus Film Group; Toonz Entertainment	Computer			January 12, 2017	84 minutes
Captain Underpants: The First Epic Movie	United States	David Soren	DreamWorks Animation	Computer			May 21, 2017 (Regency Village Theater); June 2, 2017	88 minutes
CarGo	United States	James Cullen Bressack	The Asylum	Computer			June 6, 2017	96 minutes
Cars 3	United States	Brian Fee	Pixar Animation Studios	Computer			May 23, 2017 (Kannapolis); June 16, 2017	102 minutes
Chain Chronicle Light of Haecceitas: Part 2	Japan	Masashi Kudō	Telecom Animation Film; Graphinica	Traditional			January 14, 2017	89 minutes
Chain Chronicle Light of Haecceitas: Part 3	Japan	Masashi Kudō	Telecom Animation Film; Graphinica	Traditional			February 11, 2017	93 minutes
Cinderella the Cat; Gatta Cenerentola	Italy	Alessandro Rak; Ivan Cappiello; Marino Guarnieri; Dario Sansone	Mad Entertainment	Computer			September 6, 2017 (Venice); September 14, 2017 (Italy)	86 minutes
Coco	United States	Lee Unkrich	Pixar Animation Studios	Computer			October 20, 2017 (Morelia); November 22, 2017	105 minutes
Code Geass Lelouch of the Rebellion: Awakening Path	Japan	Gorō Taniguchi	Sunrise	Traditional			October 21, 2017	135 minutes
Condorito: la película	Chile; Peru; Mexico; Argentina	Alex Orrelle; Eduardo Schuldt	Aronnax Animation Studios; Pajarraco Films, LCC	Computer			October 12, 2017 (Latin America); January 12, 2018 (United States)	88 minutes
Crayon Shin-chan: Invasion!! Alien Shiriri	Japan	Masakazu Hashimoto	Toho	Traditional			April 17, 2017	103 minutes
Da Hu Fa	China	Zhigang Yang (Busifan)	Beijing Enlight Media Co. Horgos Coloroom Pictures; Tianjin Niceboat Culture Communication	Traditional			July 13, 2017	95 minutes
Detective Conan: Crimson Love Letter	Japan	Kobun Shizuno	Toho	Traditional			April 15, 2017	112 minutes
Deep	Spain; Belgium; Switzerland	Julio Soto Gurpide	The Thinklab; Grid Animation; Kraken Films	Computer			August 25, 2017	92 minutes
Despicable Me 3	United States	Pierre Coffin; Kyle Balda	Illumination	Computer			June 14, 2017 (Annecy); June 30, 2017	90 minutes
DC Super Hero Girls: Intergalactic Games	United States	Cecilia Aranovich	Warner Bros. Animation; DC Entertainment	Traditional			May 9, 2017 (Digital); May 23, 2017 (DVD)	77 minutes
Digimon Adventure tri. Loss	Japan	Keitaro Motonaga	Toei Animation	Traditional			February 25, 2017	78 minutes (Part 4)
Digimon Adventure tri. Symbiosis	Japan	Keitaro Motonaga	Toei Animation	Traditional			September 30, 2017	85 minutes (Part 5)
Doraemon the Movie 2017: Great Adventure in the Antarctic Kachi Kochi	Japan	Atsushi Takahashi	Toho	Traditional			March 4, 2017	101 Minutes
Doru	Turkey	Can Soysal	Anibera Animation Studios	Computer			July 7, 2017	91 minutes
Eureka Seven: Hi-Evolution 1	Japan	Tomoki Kyoda	Bones	Traditional			September 16, 2017 (Part 1)	92 minutes
The Elephant King	Iran; Lebanon	Hadi Mohammadian	Honarpooya Group	Computer			May 1, 2017	80 minutes
The Emoji Movie	United States	Tony Leondis	Sony Pictures Animation	Computer			July 23, 2017 (Regency Village Theatre); July 28, 2017	86 minutes
Fairy Tail: Dragon Cry	Japan	Tatsuma Minamikawa	A-1 Pictures	Traditional			May 6, 2017	85 minutes
Fantastic Journey to OZ; Урфин Джюс и его деревянные солдаты	Russia	Vladimir Toropchin	Melnitsa Animation Studio	Computer			April 20, 2017	75 minutes
Fate/kaleid liner Prisma Illya: Vow in the Snow	Japan	Shin Oonuma	Kadokawa Animation; Silver Link	Traditional			August 26, 2017	90 minutes
Fate/stay night: Heaven's Feel I. Presage Flower	Japan	Tomonori Sudou	Ufotable	Traditional			October 14, 2017	120 minutes
Ferdinand	United States	Carlos Saldanha	Blue Sky Studios	Computer			December 10, 2017 (Los Angeles); December 15, 2017	108 minutes
Fireworks; Uchiage hanabi, shita kara miru ka? Yoko kara miru ka?	Japan	Akiyuki Shinbo; Nobuyuki Takeuchi	Shaft	Traditional			August 18, 2017	90 minutes
The Fixies: Top Secret; Фиксики: Большой секрет	Russia	Vasiko Bedoshvili; Andrey Kolpin	Petersburg Animation Studio; Aeroplane Productions	Computer			October 28, 2017	80 minutes
Free! Timeless Medley	Japan	Eisaku Kawanami	Kyoto Animation; Animation Do	Traditional			April 22, 2017	95 minutes
Free! Timeless Medley: Part 2	Japan	Eisaku Kawanami	Kyoto Animation; Animation Do	Traditional			July 1, 2017	98 minutes
Free! -Take Your Marks!-	Japan	Eisaku Kawanami	Kyoto Animation; Animation Do	Traditional			October 28, 2017	100 minutes
GadgetGang in Outer Space; BugiGangue no Espaço	Brazil; United States; India; Hungary	Ale McHaddo	44 Toons! Studio56	Computer			February 23, 2017 (Brazil); July 4, 2017 (United States)	80 minutes
Genocidal Organ	Japan	Shukō Murase	Manglobe; Geno Studio	Traditional			February 3, 2017	115 minutes
Gekijōban Haikara-san ga Tōru Zenpen – Benio, Hana no 17-sai	Japan	Kazuhiro Furuhashi	Nippon Animation	Traditional			November 11, 2017	97 minutes
GG Bond: Guarding	China	Lu Jinming; Zhong Yu	Le vision pictures	Computer			January 7, 2017	91 minutes
Girls und Panzer das Finale: Part 1	Japan	Tsutomu Mizushima	Actas	Traditional			December 9, 2017	47 minutes
Gnome Alone	United States; Canada	Peter Lepeniotis	Vanguard Animation; 3QU Media; Cinesite	Computer			November 2, 2017 (Greece and Cyprus)	85 minutes
Godzilla: Planet of the Monsters	Japan	Kobun Shizuno; Hiroyuki Seshita	Polygon Pictures	Traditional			November 17, 2017	88 minutes
Gordon & Paddy; Gordon och Paddy	Sweden	Linda Hambäck	Film i Väst; Lee Film	Traditional			December 22, 2017 (Sweden); February 12, 2018 (Berlinale)	62 minutes
Hanuman Da' Damdaar	India	Ruchi Narain	R.A.T Films; Percept Picture Company	Traditional			June 2, 2017	105 minutes
Harvie and the Magic Museum; Гурвинек: Волшебная игра Hurvínek a kouzelné muzeum	Russia; Czech Republic; Belgium	Martin Kotík; Inna Evlannikova	KinoAtis; Rolling Pictures; Grid Animation	Computer			August 31, 2017	86 minutes
Have a Nice Day; Hao ji le	China	Liu Jian	Flagship Entertainment Group; Le-Joy Animation Studio	Traditional			February 17, 2017 (Berlin)	75 minutes
Hey Arnold!: The Jungle Movie	United States	Raymie Muzquiz; Stu Livington	Snee-Oosh, Inc. Nickelodeon Animation Studio	Traditional			November 24, 2017	81 minutes
Howard Lovecraft and the Undersea Kingdom	Canada	Sean Patrick O'Reilly	Arcana Studio	Computer			October 1, 2017	89 minutes
I'll Just Live in Bando 반도에 살어리랏다 (Ban-do-e Sal-eo-li-lat-da)	South Korea	Lee Young-sun	AniSEED	Traditional			June 12, 2017 (Annecy International Animation Film Festival); July 16, 2017 (BiFan - Bucheon International Fantastic Film Festival)	85 minutes
The Incredible Story of the Giant Pear; Den utrolige historie om den kæmpestore pære	Denmark	Philip Einstein Lipski; Jørgen Lerdam; Amalie Næsby Fick	Level K	Computer			October 12, 2017	78 minutes
The Jetsons & WWE: Robo-WrestleMania!	United States	Anthony Bell	Warner Bros. Animation; Hanna-Barbera; WWE Studios	Traditional			February 28, 2017 (Digital); March 14, 2017 (DVD)	82 minutes
The Jungle Bunch; Les As de la jungle	France	David Alaux	TAT Productions; SND Groupe M6	Computer			June 13, 2017 (Annecy International Animation Film Festival); July 26, 2017	90 minutes
Journey Beyond Sodor	United Kingdom	David Stoten	HIT Entertainment; Mattel Creations	Computer			June 23, 2017 (Canada); August 22, 2017 (United States); October 16, 2017 (United Kingdom)	73 minutes
Justice League Dark	United States	Jay Oliva	Warner Bros. Animation; DC Entertainment	Traditional			January 24, 2017 (digital); February 7, 2017 (DVD and Blu-ray release)	75 minutes
Kabaneri of the Iron Fortress (part 2)	Japan	Tetsurō Araki	Wit Studio	Traditional			January 7, 2017	104 minutes
Kikoriki: Legend of the Golden Dragon; Смешарики. Легенда о золотом драконе	Russia	Denis Chernov	Petersburg Animation Studio	Computer			March 17, 2017	79 minutes
Kizumonogatari III: Reiketsu-hen	Japan	Akiyuki Shinbo; Tatsuya Oishi	Shaft	Traditional			January 6, 2017	83 minutes
The Kuflis hu:Egy kupac kufli	Hungary	Kristóf Jurik; Szabolcs Pálfi; Géza M. Tóth	KEDD Animation Studio	Flash			August 17, 2017	71 minutes
Kuroko's Basketball The Movie: Last Game	Japan	Shunsuke Tada	Production I.G	Traditional			March 18, 2017	90 minutes
The Legend of King Solomon; Salamon király kalandjai	Hungary; Israel	Albert Hanan Kaminski	Cinemon Entertainment; Eden Productions	Traditional			September 28, 2017	80 minutes
The Lego Batman Movie	United States; Australia; Denmark	Chris McKay	Warner Animation Group; DC Entertainment; RatPac-Dune Entertainment; Lin Pictures; Lord Miller Productions; Vertigo Entertainment	Computer			January 29, 2017 (Dublin); February 9, 2017 (Denmark); February 10, 2017 (United States); March 30, 2017 (Australia)	104 minutes
Lego DC Super Hero Girls: Brain Drain	United States	Todd Grimes	DC Entertainment; Warner Bros. Animation; Mattel; The Lego Group; Warner Bros. Home Entertainment	Computer		Direct-to-video	July 25, 2017 (digital) August 8, 2017 (DVD)	75 minutes
The Lego Ninjago Movie	Denmark; United States; Australia	Charlie Bean	Warner Animation Group; RatPac-Dune Entertainment; Lego System A/S; Lin Pictures; Lord Miller Productions; Vertigo Entertainment; Animal Logic	Computer			September 16, 2017 (Regency Village Theater); September 21, 2017 (Denmark); United States (United States)	101 minutes
Lego Scooby-Doo! Blowout Beach Bash	United States	Ethan Spaulding	Warner Bros. Animation; Hanna-Barbera; The Lego Group	Computer		Direct-to-video	July 11, 2017 (digital) July 25, 2017 (DVD and Blu-ray)	78 minutes
Lila's Book; El libro de Lila	Colombia	Marcela Rincon	Fosfenos Media; Palero Estudio	Traditional; Flash			September 21, 2017 (Sala Zitarrosa); September 28, 2017 (Colombia)	76 minutes
Lino: An Adventure of Nine Lives; Lino: Uma Aventura de Sete Vidas	Brazil	Rafael Ribas	Start Desenhos Animados	Computer			September 7, 2017	94 minutes
Little Heroes; Pequeños héroes	Venezuela	Juan Pablo Buscarini	Orinoco Films; Fundación Villa del Cine	Computer			May 6, 2017 (Golden Kuker Sofia); June 12, 2017 (Annecy International Animation Film Festival)	76 minutes
The Little Vampire 3D; Der kleine Vampir	Netherlands; Germany; Denmark	Richard Claus; Karsten Kiilerich	Ambient Entertainment	Computer			October 5, 2017	82 minutes
Loving Vincent	Poland; United Kingdom	Dorota Kobiela; Hugh Welchman	Trademark Films; Breakthru Films	Oil-painted / Traditional			June 12, 2017 (Annecy); September 22, 2017 (United States); October 6, 2017 (Poland); October 13, 2017 (United Kingdom)	95 minutes
Lu Over the Wall; Yoake Tsugeru Lu no Uta	Japan	Masaaki Yuasa	Science Saru	Traditional; Flash			May 19, 2017	112 minutes
Lupin the Third: Goemon Ishikawa's Spray of Blood	Japan	Takeshi Koike	Telecom Animation Film	Traditional			February 4, 2017	54 minutes
Magical Girl Lyrical Nanoha Reflection	Japan	Takayuki Hamana	Seven Arcs	Traditional			July 22, 2017	111 minutes
Mary and the Witch's Flower; Meari to Majo no Hana	Japan	Hiromasa Yonebayashi	Studio Ponoc	Traditional			July 8, 2017	103 minutes
Mazinger Z: Infinity	Japan	Junji Shimizu	Toei Animation	Traditional			October 27, 2017	95 minutes
Mission Kathmandu: The Adventures of Nelly & Simon; Nelly et Simon: Mission Yéti	Canada	Pierre Greco; Nancy Florence Savard	Productions 10e Ave; Seville Films	Computer			October 5, 2017 (FIFF); February 23, 2018 (Québec)	85 minutes
Monster Family	Germany; United Kingdom	Holger Tappe	Ambient Entertainment GmbH; United Entertainment; Mack Media; Agir; Rothkirch Cartoon Film; Sky Cinema Original Films; VideoBack	Computer			August 24, 2017 (Germany); March 2, 2018 (United Kingdom)	96 minutes
Monster Island; Isla Calaca	Mexico; Spain; India; United States; Bulgaria	Leopoldo Aguilar	Ánima Estudios; Discreet Arts Productions	Computer			September 14, 2017 (Mexico); February 20, 2021 (Spain)	80 minutes
Moomins and the Winter Wonderland; Muumien taikatalvi	Finland; Poland	Ira Carpelan; Jakub Wronski	Filmcompaniet	Stop-motion			December 1, 2017	82 minutes
Mariah Carey's All I Want for Christmas Is You	United States	Guy Vasilovich	Universal 1440 Entertainment; Splash Entertainment; Magic Carpet Productions; Universal Animation Studios	Computer			November 13, 2017	91 minutes
Mutafukaz	France; Japan	Guillaume Renard; Shōjirō Nishimi	Ankama Animations; Studio 4°C	Traditional			June 13, 2017 (Annecy Festival); May 23, 2018 (France); October 12, 2018 (Japan)	93 minutes
My Little Pony: The Movie	United States; Canada	Jayson Thiessen	Allspark Pictures; DHX Media	Traditional; Flash			September 24, 2017 (New York City); October 6, 2017 (United States and Canada)	99 minutes
Next Door Spy; Nabospionen	Denmark	Karla von Bengtson	Copenhagen Bombay; TriCoast Entertainment	Flash			August 10, 2017	77 minutes
The Night Is Short, Walk on Girl; Yoru wa Mijikashi Aruke yo Otome	Japan	Masaaki Yuasa	Science Saru	Traditional; Flash			April 7, 2017	93 minutes
The Nut Job 2: Nutty by Nature	United States; Canada; South Korea	Cal Brunker	ToonBox Entertainment; Redrover Co., Ltd. Gulfstream Pictures	Computer			August 11, 2017	91 minutes
On Happiness Road; Xing Fu Lu Shang	Taiwan	Hsin Yin Sung	Happiness Road Productions	Traditional			October 15, 2017 (BIFF); January 5, 2018 (Taiwan)	110 minutes
Overlord: The Dark Warrior	Japan	Naoyuki Itō	Madhouse	Traditional			February 25, 2017 (Part 1)	117 minutes (Part 1)
Overlord: The Undead King	Japan	Naoyuki Itō	Madhouse	Traditional			March 11, 2017 (Part 2)	108 minutes (Part 2)
The Ox	Greece	Giorgos Nikopoulos	Baubo Productions	Computer / Stop-motion / Live action			November 9, 2017 (TIFF)	67 minutes
Paddington 2	United Kingdom, France	Paul King	StudioCanal	Computer / Live action			10 November 2017	104 minutes
Peppa Pig: My First Cinema Experience	United Kingdom	Mark Baker; Iwan Watson	Astley Baker Davies Ltd; Entertainment One	Flash			April 7, 2017	72 minutes
Pipi, Pupu & Rosemary: the Mystery of the Stolen Notes; Pipì Pupù e Rosmarina in Il Mistero delle Note Rapite	Italy	Enzo D'Alò	Bolero Film	Flash			November 16, 2017	81 minutes
Pokémon the Movie: I Choose You!	Japan	Kunihiko Yuyama	OLM	Traditional			July 6, 2017 (Japan Expo); July 15, 2017 (Japan)	97 minutes
Pretty Cure Dream Stars!	Japan	Hiroshi Miyamoto	Toei Animation	Traditional			March 18, 2017	71 minutes
Rabbit School: Guardians of the Golden Egg; Die Häschenscule – Jagd nach dem Goldenen Ei	Germany	Ute von Münchow-Pohl	Akkord Film Produktion GmbH	Computer			March 16, 2017	76 minutes
Release From Heaven	Iran	Ali Noori-Oskouei	Eshragh Animation; Stunning Media	Traditional			February 1, 2017 (Fajr Film Festival); September 22, 2017 (Isfahan International Festival of Films for Children & Young Adults)	76 minutes
Resident Evil: Vendetta	Japan	Takanori Tsujimoto	Sony Pictures Entertainment Japan; Marza Animation Planet	Computer			May 27, 2017	97 minutes
Richard the Stork; A Stork's Journey	Germany; Luxembourg; Norway; Belgium	Toby Genkel; Reza Memari	Knudsen & Streuber Medienmanufaktur; Ulysses Filmproduktion; Melusine Productions; Den Siste Skilling; Walking the Dog	Computer			February 12, 2017 (BIFF); May 5, 2017 (Norway); June 30, 2017 (United States); May 11, 2017 (Germany); February 7, 2018 (France)	85 minutes
Sahara	France; Canada	Pierre Coré	Netflix; La Station Animation; Mandarin Production; Transfilm International	Computer			January 18, 2017 (L'Alpe d'Huez Film Festival); May 12, 2017 (Netflix)	84 minutes
Seitokai Yakuindomo: The Movie	Japan	Hiromitsu Kanazawa	GoHands	Traditional			July 21, 2017	60 minutes
The Shower 소나기 (So-na-gi)	South Korea	Jae-hoon Ahn	Meditation With a Pencil; EBS	Traditional			August 31, 2017	48 minutes
Si Juki the Movie	Indonesia	Faza Meonk	Falcon Pictures	Traditional			December 28, 2017	110 minutes
Shimajiro and the Rainbow Oasis	Japan	Isamu Hirabayashi	Benesse; The Answer Studio Co., Ltd.	Traditional / Live action			March 10, 2017	71 minutes
Smurfs: The Lost Village	United States	Kelly Asbury	Sony Pictures Animation; The Kerner Entertainment Company	Computer			April 5, 2017 (Belgium and Asia); April 7, 2017	90 minutes
The Son of Bigfoot; Bigfoot Junior	Belgium; France	Jeremy Degruson; Ben Stassen	StudioCanal nWave Pictures; Belga Productions; Illuminata Pictures	Computer			August 16, 2017 (France); February 16, 2018 (United States)	92 minutes
Sound! Euphonium: The Movie – May the Melody Reach You!	Japan	Taichi Ogawa	Kyoto Animation	Traditional			September 30, 2017	105 minutes
Space Battleship Yamato 2202: Warriors of Love	Japan	Nobuyoshi Habara	Xebec	Traditional			February 25, 2017	
Scooby-Doo! Shaggy's Showdown	United States	Matt Peters	Warner Bros. Animation; Hanna-Barbera	Traditional			January 31, 2017	80 minutes
The Star	United States	Timothy Reckart	Sony Pictures Animation; Walden Media; Affirm Films; The Jim Henson Company; Franklin Entertainment	Computer			November 12, 2017 (Regency Village Theater); November 17, 2017	86 minutes
Surf's Up 2: WaveMania	United States	Henry Yu	Sony Pictures Animation; WWE Studios	Computer			January 17, 2017	84 minutes
The Swan Princess: Royally Undercover	United States	Richard Rich	Nest Family Entertainment; StreetLight Animation Productions	Computer			March 28, 2017	79 minutes
Thomas & Friends: Journey Beyond Sodor	United Kingdom	David Stoten	Hit Entertainment	Computer			June 23, 2017 (Canada); August 22, 2017 (United States); October 16, 2017 (United Kingdom)	73 minutes
Sword Art Online The Movie: Ordinal Scale	Japan	Tomohiko Ito	A-1 Pictures	Traditional			February 18, 2017	120 minutes
Tad the Lost Explorer and the Secret of King Midas; Tadeo Jones 2: El secreto del Rey Midas	Spain	Enrique Gato; David Alonso	Lightbox Entertainment; Telecinco Cinema; Telefónica Studios	Computer			June 13, 2017 (Annecy)	85 minutes
The Shonku Diaries: A Unicorn Adventure	United States; India; Turkey	Kamal Bansal	Turtle in Motion Studios	Computer			June 17, 2017 (Shanghai International Film Festival); November 3, 2017 (Turkey); October 4, 2019 (United States)	92 minutes
The Tale of Peter and Fevronia; Сказ о Петре и Февронии	Russia	Yuri Kulakov	Vverh Animation Studio	Traditional			2017	85 minutes
Tales from the Lakeside; Lengemesék	Hungary	Zsolt Pálfi	Cinemon Entertainment	Flash			April 27, 2017	65 minutes
Tall Tales; Drôles de petites bêtes	France; Belgium	Antoon Krings; Arnaud Bouron	Onyx Films	Computer			June 13, 2017 (Annecy International Animation Film Festival); December 13, 2017 (France)	80 minutes
Tea Pets	China	Gary Wang	Light Chaser Animation Studios	Computer			May 20, 2017 (Seattle International Film Festival); July 21, 2017 (Shanghai International Film Festival)	98 minutes 86 minutes (South Korea)
Teen Titans: The Judas Contract	United States	Sam Liu	Warner Bros. Animation; DC Entertainment	Traditional			March 31, 2017 (WonderCon); April 4, 2017 (United States)	84 minutes
Tehran Taboo	Austria; Germany	Ali Soozandeh	Little Dream Entertainment; Coop99 Filmproduktion; Österreichischer Rundfunk	Traditional			May 20, 2017 (Cannes); November 16, 2017 (Germany)	96 minutes
Three Heroes and the King of the Sea; Три богатыря и морской царь	Russia	Konstantin Feoktistov	Melnitsa Animation Studio	Traditional			January 1, 2017	75 minutes
Three Heroes and the Princess of Egypt; Три богатыря и принцесса Египта	Russia	Konstantin Feoktistov	Melnitsa Animation Studio	Traditional			December 28, 2017	75 minutes
Tom and Jerry: Willy Wonka and the Chocolate Factory	United States	Spike Brandt	Warner Bros. Animation	Traditional			June 27, 2017 (Digital); July 11, 2017 (DVD)	79 minutes
Trinity Seven the Movie: The Eternal Library and the Alchemist Girl	Japan	Hiroshi Nishikiori	Seven Arcs Pictures	Traditional			February 25, 2017	55 minutes
Virus Tropical	Colombia; Ecuador	Santiago Caicedo	Ikki Films	Flash			October 21, 2017 (Animation Is Film Festival); May 17, 2018 (Colombia)	97 minutes
Wall	Canada	Cam Christiansen	National Film Board of Canada	Traditional / Computer			September 25, 2017 (CIFF)	82 minutes
Where It Floods	United States	Joel Benjamin	Electricbeard Productions	Computer			May 2, 2017 (Midwest Independent Film Festival) (premiere)	47 minutes
Yowamushi Pedal: Re:GENERATION	Japan	Osamu Nabeshima	TMS/8PAN	Traditional			October 13, 2017	90 minutes
Zombillenium	France; Belgium	Arthur de Pins; Alexis Ducord	Maybe Movies	Computer			May 24, 2017 (Cannes)	78 minutes

== Highest-grossing animated films ==
The following is a list of the 10 highest-grossing animated feature films first released in 2017.

Rank	Title	Distributor	Worldwide gross	Ref
1	Despicable Me 3	Universal Pictures	$1,034,799,409	
2	Coco	Walt Disney Pictures	$807,082,196	
3	The Boss Baby	20th Century Fox	$527,965,936	
4	Cars 3	Walt Disney Pictures	$383,930,656	
5	The Lego Batman Movie	Warner Bros.	$311,950,384	
6	Ferdinand	20th Century Fox	$296,069,199	
7	The Emoji Movie	Columbia Pictures	$217,776,646	
8	Smurfs: The Lost Village	Columbia Pictures	$197,183,546	
9	Captain Underpants: The First Epic Movie	20th Century Fox	$125,506,758	
10	The Lego Ninjago Movie	Warner Bros.	$123,081,555	

Despicable Me 3 became the second non-Disney film and the sixth animated film after Toy Story 3 (2010), Frozen (2013), Minions (2015), Zootopia and Finding Dory (both in 2016) to gross over $1 billion, and is currently the seventh-highest-grossing animated film of all time and the 36th-highest-grossing film of all time. The Despicable Me franchise became the highest-grossing animated franchise of all time, passing the Shrek franchise and the 15th-highest-grossing film series ever. It also has the highest theater count ever for any film (animated or live-action) with 4,536 breaking the record from The Twilight Saga: Eclipse (2010).

== See also ==
- List of animated television series of 2017
