= White Snake: Afloat =

- Theatrical poster
- 白蛇：浮生 (Chinese)
- Directed by: Chen Jianxi; Li Jiakai
- Written by: Gary Wang
- Based on: Legend of the White Snake
- Produced by: Zeng Fanyu
- Music by: Guo Haowei
- Production companies: Light Chaser Animation Studios; Wanda Media; Tianjin Maoyan Weiying Culture Media; Shanghai Tao Piao Piao Film Culture; China Film Co.; Ruyi Film; Zhejiang Hengdian Film
- Distributed by: Wanda Film Media Co., Ltd.
- Release date: August 10, 2024 (China)
- Running time: 133 minutes
- Country: China
- Language: Mandarin
- Box office: ¥424 million

White Snake: Afloat is a 2024 Chinese animated fantasy romance film. It is the sequel to the 2019 film White Snake and the prequel to the 2021 film Green Snake (also known as White Snake 2: The Tribulation of the Green Snake). The film was directed by Chen Jianxi and Li Jiakai, written by Gary Wang, and produced by Light Chaser Animation Studios. It had limited screenings across China starting August 3, 2024, and was officially released on the Qixi Festival (Chinese Valentine's Day) on August 10, 2024. In Japan it was released on January 30, 2026. It has grossed over $53 million worldwide.

== Voice cast ==
Character	Mandarin dub	Japanese dub
Xiaobai (Bianca)	Zhang Zhe	Suzuko Mimori
Xu Xian	Yang Tianxiang	Daisuke Sakuma
Xiaoqing (Verta)	Tang Xiaoxi	Ayane Sakura
Fahai	Liu Cong	Shunsuke Takeuchi
Li Gongfu	Zhang He	Tomokazu Sugita
Baoqingfang's Owner	Zheng Xiaopu	Aoi Yūki
Old Fox	Ma Cheng	
Rat Demon	Lin Qiang	
White Crane Boy	Li Nan	

== Music ==
On July 23, 2024, Light Chaser Animation released the film's theme song, "Afloat and White," performed by Chen Haoyu and Chen Lijun, with lyrics by Da Mao and composed by Guo Haowei, who also served as the music producer.

In Japan, the Japanese theme song was performed by Snow Man.
