= François Bourdrez =

Dutch civil engineer (1901–1939)

François Joseph Martial Bourdrez
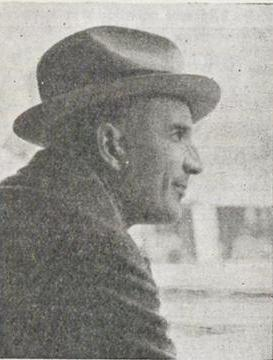
- Born: 18 July 1901; The Hague, Netherlands
- Died: 10 May 1939 (aged 37); Zhaotong, China
- Occupation: Civil engineer

François Joseph Martial Bourdrez (18 July 1901, in The Hague – 10 May 1939, in Zhaotong) was a Dutch civil engineer who worked for the League of Nations in China for seven and a half years. He advised the Chinese Kuomintang government of General Chiang Kai-shek on road construction and hydraulic engineering.

Bourdrez worked on the first network of paved roads in China and helped the Chinese government to manage the major rivers. Together with some Dutch colleagues, he stood at the cradle of a long cooperation between the Netherlands and China in the field of water management. Bourdrez and two Chinese colleagues were killed together on May 10, 1939, when their boat sank while exploring the upper Yangtze River.

== Life and work ==
François Bourdrez was born on July 18, 1901, in The Hague. He studied civil engineering at the TU in Delft. After his studies and military service, he worked for three years in the then Dutch East Indies at Du Croo & Brauns in Surabaya and at the Deli Maatschappij in Medan. From 1928 to 1931, Bourdrez worked for Koninklijke Philips in Eindhoven, where he oversaw the construction of new factories in various European countries. However, the great economic crisis of the 1930s brought Philips into financial difficulties and Bourdrez lost his job. On November 15, 1931, Bourdrez entered the service of the League of Nations. The League of Nations was deeply involved in the reconstruction of greatly impoverished China by the Kuomintang government in the 1930s. The League of Nations sent more than 50 Western experts to China in the 1930s, including dozens of doctors. The relationship between the League of Nations and China was complex, however, because the League of Nations failed to intervene when Japan seized the Northeastern province of Manchuria in 1931.

In China, Bourdrez was mainly involved in road construction from 1931 to 1933. Together with his Polish League of Nations colleague Mieczysław Okęcki, Bourdrez advised the Chinese government on the construction of the first network of paved roads connecting the major cities in eastern China. From 1933 on, Bourdrez became increasingly involved in hydraulic engineering. At the time, China regularly had to deal with massive floods. The flooding in Central China in 1931 was particularly catastrophic, resulting in between 400,000 and 4 million deaths. Chinese Finance Minister Tse-Ven Soong had managed to obtain a loan in kind from the United States, known as the "Cotton and Wheat Loan". The US got rid of its surplus cotton and grain and the Chinese government sold the cotton and grain to its own people or paid workers in kind. This includes financing hydraulic engineering projects. Bourdrez traveled to every corner of China to see the rivers with his own eyes. He advised directly to the Chinese water management service on the implementation of projects, but also on the accumulation of knowledge. On his initiative a course for further training of graduated young Chinese engineers was set up. In addition, Bourdrez contributed to the creation of hydrographic and geodesic departments. The geodesic department was badly needed, because there were no reliable maps for large parts of China. The later Prime Minister, Professor Willem Schermerhorn, was brought to China by Bourdrez in 1936 to help translate the aerial images into maps.

== War ==
Bourdrez lived in Shanghai until the end of 1932, where he experienced up close the brief war between Japan and China known as the Shanghai Incident. From the end of 1932, Bourdrez lived in Nanjing, the then capital of China. When Japan invaded China in 1937 and advanced to Nanjing, Bourdrez intended to stay in Nanjing. He assumed that his status as a diplomat would leave him alone. However, due to the bombing of Nanjing and an acute appendicitis, he decided to flee in September 1937. His house was ransacked twice by Japanese soldiers during the Nanjing Massacre. In 1937 and 1938 Bourdrez worked for some time in the South of China. At the end of 1938, Bourdrez and his family left for Europe for leave.

== Death ==
In January 1939 Bourdrez returned to China. He traveled via Hanoi to the war capital of Chongqing. Chongqing was in danger of being shut in by the advance of the Japanese troops, so the Chinese government was looking for new ways to supply Chongqing. At the request of the Chinese government, Bourdrez set out with two Chinese fellow engineers on an expedition to investigate whether the headwaters of the Yangtze River were navigable. Bourdrez died on May 10, 1939, while exploring the Yangtze River. The boat, with a skipper, the two Chinese engineers and François Bourdrez on board, hit a rock. The boat sank and the three engineers drowned. Only the skipper survived the accident. Frenchman Henri Maux and Scottish doctor Robert Robertson, both colleagues of the League of Nations, immediately began a search along the river from the scene of the accident. In early June, they found his body 140 kilometers downstream. A big farewell ceremony was organized by the Chinese government in Kunming.

== Personal life ==
François Bourdrez was the eldest son of Joseph Jean Leonard Bourdrez (1862-1924) and Henriëtte Petronella Ramaer (1870-1960). In 1934 he married the Swiss Elisabeth Von Meyenburg. They had two sons: Jan Ewout Bourdrez (1936) and Erik Herman Bourdrez (1938-1991).

== Legacy ==
- In 1937, François Bourdrez and Nico van den Heuvel both received an award of the third class of the order of Yu the Great. This included a medal and a certificate signed by Chiang Kai-shek and Tse-Ven Soong, among others.

François Bourdrez has come to symbolize the long cooperation between China and the Netherlands in the field of hydraulic engineering. Some examples:

- Immediately after Bourdrez's death, the Bourdrez Memorial Scholarship Fund was established at the initiative of the Chinese government, with the aim of allowing Chinese students to study in the Netherlands. Due to the outbreak of the Second World War, this ended prematurely.
- In 2005, during a Dutch trade mission led by Minister of Transport, Public Works and Water Management Karla Peijs, attention was paid to the life and work of Bourdrez. For that occasion, the Dutch Embassy in Beijing published a booklet with texts in both English and Chinese: François Bourdrez: a struggle against mighty rivers 1901-1939.
- In 2015 the Nanjing Hydraulic Research Institute commemorated its 80th anniversary and a memorial plaque was unveiled for the three Dutch engineers who were involved in the founding of the NHRI: Bourdrez, Van den Heuvel and Alma. The memorial stone was an initiative of Roland van den Berg, former ambassador of the Netherlands in China (from 1986 to 1992), and is now in the museum of the NHRI.
- In 2016, Minister of Infrastructure and the Environment Melanie Schultz van Haegen mentioned the anniversary of the NHRI and the memorial plaque in a speech.
