= Chinese Dutch =

Chinese(-)Dutch or Dutch(-)Chinese may refer to:

- People's Republic of China–Netherlands relations (cf. "a Chinese Dutch treaty")
- Chinese people in the Netherlands
- Dutch people in China; see also Category:Dutch expatriates in China
- People with dual citizenship of the Netherlands and the People's Republic of China or the Republic of China

== See also ==
- Dutch Indochina, an uncommon alternative name for the Dutch East Indies
