= 2010s in film =

The decade of the 2010s in film involved many significant developments in the motion picture industry as Disney towered all over its competitors. The studio's titles occupy exactly half of the top 50 highest-grossing movies at the worldwide box office of these ten years with solely one of those entries not reaching a billion dollars and the only three features on the entire list to cross the $2 billion mark, while Universal and Warner Bros. share the distant second place at eight titles each. Furthermore, non-Disney films managed to become the top-grosser of a year merely twice during the decade. This domination culminated in the acquisition of 21st Century Fox by Disney.

== Trends ==
- Major film studios attempted to replicate the box office dominance of Disney's Marvel Cinematic Universe (which also had a few releases by Paramount, Universal, and Sony) through establishing their own blockbuster shared universe franchises. Despite not being as lucrative on average, Warner Bros. was able to build multiple such franchises with the likes of the DC Extended Universe, MonsterVerse (co-owned by Legendary), and Wizarding World; while 20th Century Fox's X-Men franchise transitioned into being a shared world and Sony's Spider-Man Universe got off to a promising start. However, some other attempts such as Universal's Dark Universe were immediately unsuccessful or ultimately went unproduced. Overall, this movement especially led the superhero film subgenre to attain monumental heights of prosperity.
- Disney capitalized on nostalgia by producing several live action or photorealistic remakes/re-adaptations of its famous hand-drawn animated films: Alice in Wonderland (2010), Maleficent (2014), Cinderella (2015), The Jungle Book (2016), Beauty and the Beast (2017), Aladdin (2019), The Lion King (2019), et cetera.
- Film series adaptations of popular young adult fiction novels became more prevalent (three of which were distributed or acquired by Lionsgate, and two by 20th Century Fox). After the Harry Potter, Twilight, and Percy Jackson series ended in the early years of the decade, the trend's focus switched from the fantasy genre to dystopian sci-fi with the Hunger Games, Divergent, and Maze Runner series. Other efforts of this kind failed to generate any sequels except for DreamWorks Animation's How to Train Your Dragon series, which took an alternative path by being a non-live action project that was just very loosely based on its source materials and had longer intervals between feature releases (though supported by the likes of short films and TV shows set in the same canon).

== Highest-grossing films ==
The list has more 2019 films in the top 50 than any other year, with nine in total (seven by Disney). It is then followed by 2015, 2016, 2017, and 2018 with six; 2012 with five; 2013 with four; 2010 and 2011 with three; and 2014 with two (the only year in which Disney did not have a billion dollar grosser and failed to make the list). All but three films (two animated and one biopic) are based on another property. Figures are given in United States dollars.

List of worldwide highest-grossing films
Rank	Title	Distributor(s)	Worldwide gross	Year	Ref.
1	Avengers: Endgame	Disney	$2,797,800,564	2019	
2	Star Wars: The Force Awakens	Disney	$2,068,223,624	2015	
3	Avengers: Infinity War	Disney	$2,048,359,754	2018	
4	Jurassic World	Universal	$1,671,713,208	2015	
5	The Lion King	Disney	$1,656,943,394	2019	
6	The Avengers	Disney	$1,518,812,988	2012	
7	Furious 7	Universal	$1,516,045,911	2015	
8	Frozen II	Disney	$1,450,026,933	2019	
9	Avengers: Age of Ultron	Disney	$1,405,403,694	2015	
10	Black Panther	Disney	$1,346,913,161	2018	
11	Harry Potter and the Deathly Hallows – Part 2	Warner Bros.	$1,341,511,219	2011	
12	Star Wars: The Last Jedi	Disney	$1,332,539,889	2017	
13	Jurassic World: Fallen Kingdom	Universal	$1,309,484,461	2018	
14	Frozen	Disney	$1,290,000,000	2013	
15	Beauty and the Beast	Disney	$1,263,521,126	2017	
16	Incredibles 2	Disney	$1,242,808,192	2018	
17	The Fate of the Furious	Universal	$1,236,005,118	2017	
18	Iron Man 3	Disney	$1,214,811,252	2013	
19	Minions	Universal	$1,159,398,397	2015	
20	Captain America: Civil War	Disney	$1,153,304,495	2016	
21	Aquaman	Warner Bros.	$1,147,661,807	2018	
22	Spider-Man: Far From Home	Sony	$1,131,927,996	2019	
23	Captain Marvel	Disney	$1,128,274,794	2019	
24	Transformers: Dark of the Moon	Paramount	$1,123,794,079	2011	
25	Skyfall	Sony / MGM	$1,108,561,013	2012	
26	Transformers: Age of Extinction	Paramount	$1,104,054,072	2014	
27	The Dark Knight Rises	Warner Bros.	$1,084,939,099	2012	
28	Toy Story 4	Disney	$1,073,394,593	2019	
29	Joker	Warner Bros.	$1,072,651,773	2019	
30	Toy Story 3	Disney	$1,066,969,703	2010	
31	Star Wars: The Rise of Skywalker	Disney	$1,065,837,407	2019	
32	Rogue One: A Star Wars Story	Disney	$1,056,057,273	2016	
33	Aladdin	Disney	$1,050,693,953	2019	
34	Pirates of the Caribbean: On Stranger Tides	Disney	$1,045,713,802	2011	
35	Despicable Me 3	Universal	$1,034,799,409	2017	
36	Finding Dory	Disney	$1,028,570,889	2016	
37	Alice in Wonderland	Disney	$1,025,467,110	2010	
38	Zootopia	Disney	$1,023,784,195	2016	
39	The Hobbit: An Unexpected Journey	Warner Bros.	$1,021,103,568	2012	
40	Despicable Me 2	Universal	$970,761,885	2013	
41	The Jungle Book	Disney	$966,550,600	2016	
42	Jumanji: Welcome to the Jungle	Sony	$962,126,927	2017	
43	Harry Potter and the Deathly Hallows – Part 1	Warner Bros.	$960,283,305	2010	
44	The Hobbit: The Desolation of Smaug	Warner Bros.	$958,366,855	2013	
45	The Hobbit: The Battle of the Five Armies	Warner Bros.	$956,019,788	2014	
46	Bohemian Rhapsody	20th Century	$903,655,259	2018	
47	Spectre	Sony / MGM	$880,674,609	2015	
48	Spider-Man: Homecoming	Sony	$880,166,924	2017	
49	Ice Age: Continental Drift	20th Century	$877,244,782	2012	
50	The Secret Life of Pets	Universal	$875,457,937	2016	

=== Highest-grossing film per year ===
Disney releases were the annual top-grossers for the entire latter half of the decade.

Year	Title	Studio(s)	Worldwide Gross	Ref.
2010	Toy Story 3	Disney	$1,066,969,703	
2011	Harry Potter and the Deathly Hallows – Part 2	Warner Bros.	$1,342,511,219	
2012	The Avengers	Disney	$1,518,812,988	
2013	Frozen	Disney	$1,280,802,282	
2014	Transformers: Age of Extinction	Paramount	$1,104,054,072	
2015	Star Wars: The Force Awakens	Disney	$2,068,223,624	
2016	Captain America: Civil War	Disney	$1,153,304,495	
2017	Star Wars: The Last Jedi	Disney	$1,332,539,889	
2018	Avengers: Infinity War	Disney	$2,048,359,754	
2019	Avengers: Endgame	Disney	$2,797,800,564	

== Most acclaimed films ==
On Rotten Tomatoes, the following five films of the 2010s received 100% critics' ratings.

- The Tale of the Princess Kaguya (2013)
- Summer 1993 (2017)
- Leave No Trace (2018)
- Minding the Gap (2018)
- Honeyland (2019)

Metacritic listed the following as the top ten highest rated films (at the time of their release) of the 2010s.

1. Boyhood
2. Moonlight
3. Roma
4. Manchester by the Sea
5. 12 Years a Slave
6. Gravity
7. Parasite
8. Portrait of a Lady on Fire
9. Carol
10. The Social Network

Metacritic also listed the following films as most mentioned on critic's lists of the best films of the 2010s.

1. Mad Max: Fury Road
2. Moonlight
3. The Social Network
4. Get Out
5. Under the Skin
6. The Tree of Life
7. (Tie) Inception and Inside Llewyn Davis
8. Boyhood
9. The Master

Den of Geek listed the following as the top ten best movies of the decade.

1. Parasite
2. Inception
3. Mad Max: Fury Road
4. Get Out
5. Her
6. Ex Machina
7. Spider-Man: Into the Spider-Verse
8. Hereditary
9. The Social Network
10. Star Wars: The Last Jedi

Rolling Stone magazine listed the following as the top ten best movies of the decade.

1. Moonlight
2. The Social Network
3. Holy Motors
4. Boyhood
5. Get Out
6. Toni Erdmann
7. The Master
8. Roma
9. Mad Max: Fury Road
10. Carol

Indiewire listed the following as the top ten best movies of the decade.

1. Moonlight
2. Under the Skin
3. Certified Copy
4. The Act of Killing
5. Inside Llewyn Davis
6. Holy Motors
7. Carol
8. The Master
9. Mad Max: Fury Road
10. Lady Bird

In 2016, BBC's 100 Greatest Films of the 21st Century poll of film critics listed the following as the top ten best films of the 2010s so far.

1. Boyhood
2. The Tree of Life
3. A Separation
4. Inside Llewyn Davis
5. The Act of Killing
6. Holy Motors
7. Mad Max: Fury Road
8. The Grand Budapest Hotel
9. The Master
10. The Social Network

In 2017, The New York Times' list of "The 25 Best Films of the 21st Century So Far" selected the following as the best films of the 2010s so far.

1. A Touch of Sin
2. Inside Out
3. Boyhood
4. Inside Llewyn Davis
5. Timbuktu
6. In Jackson Heights
7. White Material
8. Mad Max: Fury Road
9. Moonlight

=== Awards ===
The following films received the most acclaim at the Academy Awards during the 2010s.

Year	Ceremony	Most nominations	Most awards	Best Picture
2010	83rd	The King's Speech (12)	Inception and The King's Speech (4)	The King's Speech
2011	84th	The Artist (11)	The Artist and Hugo (5)	The Artist
2012	85th	Lincoln (12)	Life of Pi (4)	Argo
2013	86th	American Hustle and Gravity (10)	Gravity (7)	12 Years a Slave
2014	87th	Birdman or (The Unexpected Virtue of Ignorance) and The Grand Budapest Hotel (9)	Birdman or (The Unexpected Virtue of Ignorance) and The Grand Budapest Hotel (4)	Birdman or (The Unexpected Virtue of Ignorance)
2015	88th	The Revenant (12)	Mad Max: Fury Road (6)	Spotlight
2016	89th	La La Land (14)	La La Land (6)	Moonlight
2017	90th	The Shape of Water (13)	The Shape of Water (4)	The Shape of Water
2018	91st	The Favourite and Roma (10)	Bohemian Rhapsody (4)	Green Book
2019	92nd	Joker (11)	Parasite (4)	Parasite

== List of films ==
- 2010 in film
- 2011 in film
- 2012 in film
- 2013 in film
- 2014 in film
- 2015 in film
- 2016 in film
- 2017 in film
- 2018 in film
- 2019 in film

== See also ==
- Film, History of film, Lists of films
- List of animated feature films of the 2010s
- Popular culture: 2010s in music
