= Light Chaser Animation Studios =

Chinese CG animation film studio

- Industry: CGI animation; Motion pictures
- Founded: March 2013; 12 years ago
- Founder: Gary Wang
- Headquarters: Beijing, China
- Website: www.zhuiguang.com

Light Chaser Animation Studios (Chinese: 追光动画; pinyin: Zhuī Guāng Dònghuà) is a Chinese CG animation film studio based in Beijing, China. The studio was founded in early 2013 by Gary Wang, the founder and ex-CEO of the popular Chinese video sharing website Tudou.com.

== History ==
In an interview with the Wall Street Journal on March 12, 2013, Gary Wang announced Light Chaser Animation, a movie studio to produce animated feature films targeting the rapidly growing Chinese movie market, which grew by 30% in 2012 and was widely expected to overtake the U.S. market in size by 2020. He cited the lack of quality domestically produced animation content, a rapidly growing domestic market, and improving environment for movie distribution, promotion and copyrights in China as the main reasons behind his decision.

Light Chaser's website states that its main goal is to "create world-class animated films".

Their first animated feature, Little Door Gods, directed by Wang, opened in China on January 1, 2016. It premiered in the United States on May 20, 2017, at the Seattle International Film Festival.

Light Chaser's second feature film, Tea Pets, was released in China on July 21, 2017. In the United States, Vision Films distributed the film as Toys & Pets. An airline safety video was made for Hainan Airlines starring this film's characters.

Their third feature film, Cats and Peachtopia, was released in China on April 5, 2018. In the United States, Viva Pictures released the movie as "Cats" on DirecTV Pay-per-view in late 2019, and distributed the movie theatrically on January 24, 2020.

Their fourth feature film, White Snake, directed by Amp Wong and Zhao Ji, was released on January 11, 2019, in China. The film received a limited release in the United States and Canada on November 15, 2019, with GKIDS acting as the distributor. It also debuted in France at the Annecy International Animated Film Festival. The film is a co-production with American studio Warner Bros. Warner Bros. has rights in China and is credited as a co-producer due to its significant involvement in the creation of the film. The film won the Golden Angel for "Best Chinese & American Co-Production Animation Film" at the Chinese American Film Festival.

Their fifth film, New Gods: Nezha Reborn, was released in February 2021. A works-in-process feature about the film was to premiere at the Annecy International Animated Film Festival.

The company has been focusing on animation production technology since its establishment, and is building its own render farm and developing technology. In addition, the software has introduced Maya, Houdini, ZBrush, and Arnold.

== Filmography ==
Title	Release date(s)	Budget(s)	Box office gross	Rotten Tomatoes	Metacritic
Little Door Gods	January 1, 2016	$12 million	$11.9 million	N/A	N/A
Tea Pets	July 21, 2017	$12 million	$5 million	N/A	N/A
Cats and Peachtopia	April 5, 2018	$10.5 million	$20.5 million	N/A	N/A
White Snake	January 11, 2019	$11.2 million	$61.6 million	68% (22 reviews)	60 (6 reviews)
New Gods: Nezha Reborn	February 12, 2021	N/A	$70.4 million	N/A	N/A
Green Snake	July 23, 2021	N/A	$90.7 million	N/A	N/A
New Gods: Yang Jian	August 19, 2022	N/A	$82.3 million	N/A	N/A
Chang'an	July 8, 2023	N/A	$258.2 million	N/A	N/A
White Snake: Afloat	August 10, 2024	N/A	$56.4 Million	N/A	N/A
Curious Tales of a Temple	July 12, 2025	N/A	N/A	N/A	N/A
