= Marc van der Chijs =

Dutch businessman

Marc van der Chijs (born 11 October 1972, Arnhem) is a business man and investor. Among others he was the co-founder, with Gary Wang, of the popular Chinese video sharing website Tudou.com. After moving to Canada in 2013 he became active in Bitcoin and blockchain, among others founding First Block Capital, Hut 8 Mining, and FirstCoin.com.

== Career ==
Raised mostly in the Netherlands, he lived in many different countries, including Curaçao, Belgium, France, Germany, Indonesia, China, and Canada. From 1991 Van der Chijs studied business economics in Maastricht, and then took a traineeship at Daimler-Benz; after working at their headquarters in Stuttgart as well as in Indonesia, he moved to Beijing in 1999 to take up a position as senior controller for Daimler-Benz' China operations. Soon after, he resigned from that position and began working as an independent consultant while also studying Chinese on the side.

In 2004, Van der Chijs's wife Grace Wang introduced him to Gary Wang, a former classmate of hers at Insead. The two men established Tudou in Shanghai in 2005; van der Chijs was the one to suggest the name. As of 2008, van der Chijs has left more of the operation of Tudou to Gary Wang, who has taken up the chief executive officer position. Instead, van der Chijs concentrated on his responsibilities as CEO of Spil Games Asia, a Dutch internet games company.

In 2013 Van der Chijs left China and moved to Vancouver, where he became a managing partner in venture capital fund CrossPacific Capital. His main activities were in FinTech, with a focus on cryptocurrencies and blockchain technologies. In early 2017 Van der Chijs founded the first registered cryptocurrency investment fund in Canada, First Block Capital, and launched the first licensed Bitcoin fund in the world (FBC Bitcoin Trust). He also founded Initial Coin Offering investment bank First Coin Capital that he sold to Mike Novogratz in January 2018 and the largest Bitcoin miner in North America Hut 8 Mining that he took public in March 2018.

Since July 2013 he is also on the board of Chinese P2P lending company Dianrong.com (Sinolending) and in 2014 Van der Chijs co-founded the P2P insurance company Uvamo.com. Additionally, he is an advisor for Emercoin.
