= China–Netherlands relations =

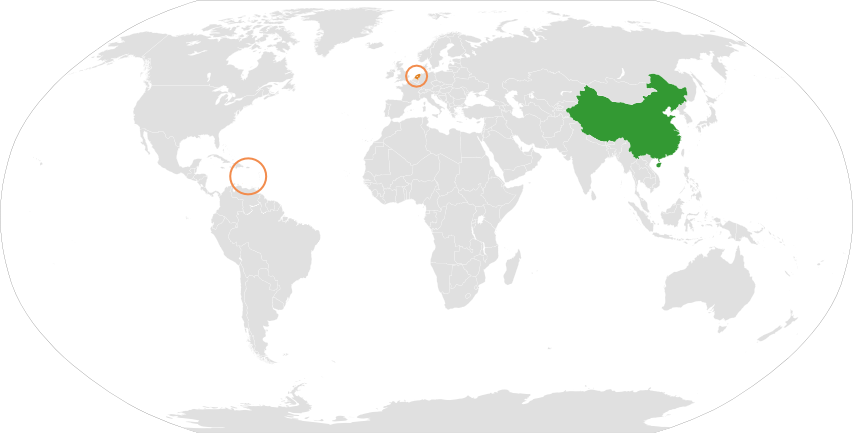
- China: Netherlands

The People's Republic of China (PRC) and the Netherlands commenced official diplomatic relations in November 1954. In May 1972, diplomatic mission was increased to ambassadorial level. On 11 May 1981, the diplomatic relations was downgraded to the charge d'affaires level due to the Dutch government ratifying the construction of two submarines for Taiwan by Dutch companies. Relations remained muted till 1 February 1984, when China and the Netherlands restored ambassadorial diplomatic relations.

== History ==
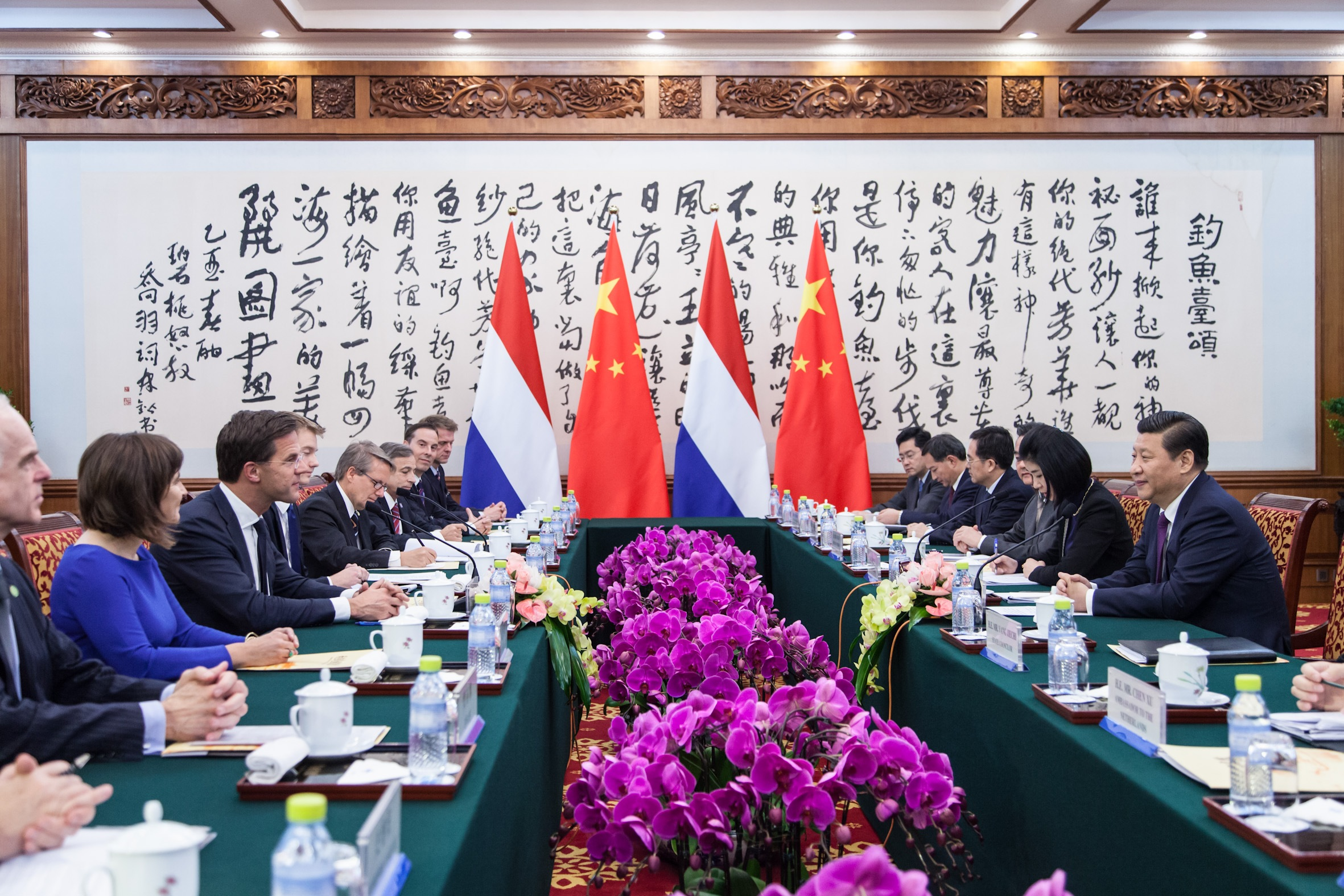
Dutch Prime Minister Mark Rutte with Chinese leader Xi Jinping in December 2013

China-Dutch relations began prior to the founding of the People's Republic of China in the 17th and 18th century when Dutch traders of the Verenigde Oostindische Compagnie (VOC) setup trading post in Canton and also in the western coast of Taiwan. Johan Nieuhof's account of the first VOC embassy to Beijing in 1655–1657—and the objections against it raised by members of the Jesuit China Mission—became the influential and much-translated 1665 Embassy from the East-India Company.

China-Dutch relations contributed to the development of China's first nationality law, Da Qing guoji taoli (Nationality regulations of the Great Qing). In 1907, the Dutch colonial government in the Dutch East Indies planned to institute a nationality law based on the jus soli principle. Relevant to relations with Qing-era China, the Dutch law would mean that all Chinese born in Dutch territory would be Dutch subjects. The Qing government stated to the Dutch government that it would not accept a Dutch decision to treat Chinese in its territory as Dutch citizens. In 1909, the Qing government instituted its nationality law to define its citizenship policy.

=== Cold War ===
During the Korean War, the Netherlands' Regiment van Heutsz under the United Nations Command fought the PRC's People's Volunteer Army in multiple battles.

PRC–Netherlands began in 1954 to establish the diplomatic relations of the charge d'affaires level. On 18 May 1972, Sino-Dutch relations were upgraded to the ambassadorial level. In the 1980s Taiwan ordered two submarines from a Dutch shipyard which were delivered despite tremendous Chinese pressure. China accused the Netherlands of colluding with American President Ronald Reagan and downgraded relations to the charge d'affaires level with the Netherlands on 11 May 1981, while threatening to do the same with the US. In 1984, the Netherlands agreed not to export additional military goods in order to restore relations to the ambassadorial level.

=== 21st century ===
In March 2014, Chinese Communist Party general secretary Xi Jinping made the first state visit of China to the Netherlands.

In July 2019, the UN ambassadors from 22 nations, including Netherlands, signed a joint letter to the UNHRC condemning China's alleged mistreatment of the Uyghurs and other minorities, urging the Chinese government to close the Xinjiang re-education camps. The PRC continues to deny the allegations, with support from several Muslim countries like Saudi Arabia, Burkina Faso, Qatar, UAE, Iraq, Pakistan and Egypt. Many Chinese allies such as Russia, Belarus, DPRK, Cuba, Angola, Vietnam and Laos have strongly supported China on the issue.

In February 2021, the Dutch House of Representatives voted to recognize the Chinese government's treatment of its Uyghur Muslim minority as genocide, becoming the first country in the European Union to do so.

In February 2024, the Netherlands Defence Intelligence and Security Service and the General Intelligence and Security Service stated that Chinese state hackers penetrated a Dutch military network the prior year. The same month, Dutch trade minister Geoffrey van Leeuwen justified export controls on ASML tools to China on the grounds that they would be used for "high-value weapons systems and weapons of mass destruction." In April 2024, the Dutch Military Intelligence and Security Service stated that Chinese spies were actively targeting the Netherlands' semiconductor, aerospace and maritime industries in order to strengthen China's armed forces.

In June 2024, the Dutch Ministry of Defence accused China of creating an "unsafe situation" when its fighter jets encircled Dutch frigate HNLMS Tromp in international waters in the East China Sea. In October 2024, the Dutch National Coordinator for Security and Counterterrorism stated that Chinese state-backed cyberattacks had increasingly moved from cyberespionage to also prepare for sabotage.

In May 2025, Dutch defense minister Ruben Brekelmans stated that Chinese espionage on the Netherlands' semiconductor sector is "intensifying." In October 2025, the Dutch Ministry of Economic Affairs took control of Nexperia's governance using the powers of the Goods Availability Act, citing national security and European economic security. The Chinese government subsequently banned Nexperia from exporting products that it makes in China. In April 2026, the Dutch head of military intelligence stated that Chinese espionage is increasingly targeting Western military industries. In May 2026, China's People's Liberation Army stated that it used electronic warfare attacks on the Dutch frigate De Ruyter to drive it out of disputed areas in the South China Sea near the Paracel Islands.

== Trade ==
Netherlands export to China includes petrochemicals, machinery, transport equipment, food, high technology and fossil fuels. China's export to the Netherlands includes computer and consumer electronics, toys and clothes.

== Resident diplomatic missions ==
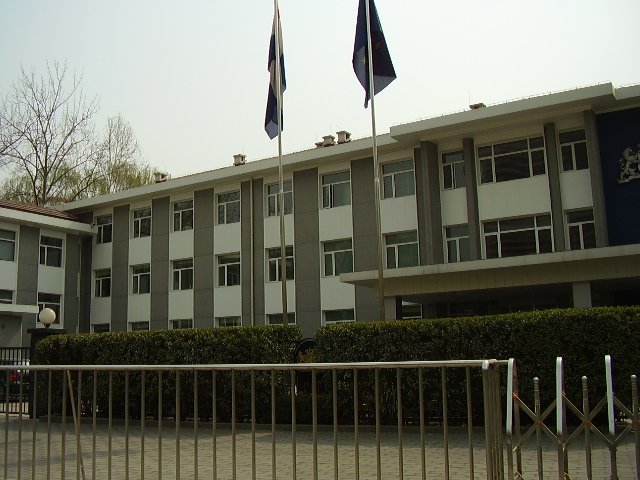
Embassy of the Netherlands in Beijing

- China has an embassy in The Hague.
- the Netherlands has an embassy in Beijing and consulates-general in Guangzhou, Hong Kong and Shanghai.

== Public opinion ==
A survey published in 2026 by the Pew Research Center found that 34% of Dutch people had a favorable view of China, while 59% had an unfavorable view. It also found that 49% of Dutch people in the 18-35 age group had positive opinions of China.

== See also ==
- Chinese people in the Netherlands
- Chinese people in Europe
- Dutch people in China
- China–European Union relations
- Marc van der Chijs, Dutch co-founder of popular Chinese video-sharing website Tudou
