= Steven French (actor) =

American actor

Steve French
- Born: Steven French
- Occupations: Actor, voice-over artist, television announcer
- Years active: 2009–present
- Website: www.stevefrenchvo.com

Steven "Steve" French is an American actor, television announcer and film and television voice-over actor. French is the recipient of a Drama Desk Award for the musical In Transit; and known for his voice-over work in such television shows as Unbreakable Kimmy Schmidt and announcer for Match Game with host Alec Baldwin, along with film The Guardian Brothers. He has appeared on- and off-Broadway. Since 2021, he hosts the weekly podcast version of the television series Unsolved Mysteries.

== Career ==
French first appeared on stage in Barton Bishop’s “Still the River Runs,” at Center Stage Zootopia Theater Company, in New York City. He then went on to appear as a black jack dealer on the television soap opera All My Children.

In 2013, French appeared in an episode on The Michael J. Fox Show. He later went on to provide voice-over credits for such films as The Guardian Brothers, and two episodes on the television series Unbreakable Kimmy Schmidt with Ellie Kemper.

After winning a Drama Desk Award, French became the host for the ‘’Broadway Inspirational Voices’’ podcast; along with the television announcer for the new revived Match Game starring Alec Baldwin. He also voiced promos for Major League Baseball on ESPN.

== Filmography ==
=== Television ===
Year	Title	Role	Notes
2009	All My Children	Black Jack Dealer	Episode: "#1. 10256"
2013	The Michael J. Fox Show	Hockey Dad	Episode: "Hobbies"
2016	Match Game	Announcer	
2016	Unbreakable Kimmy Schmidt	Documentary narrator / Bunny and Kitty Announcer	2 episodes; uncredited
2017	Odd Mom Out	News anchor (voice)	Episode "Homo Erectus"; uncredited
2018	Maniac	Koala (voice)	Episode: "Windmills"; uncredited
2022	Girls5eva	P.B.A.G. Announcer	Episode: "B.P.E."; uncredited
2024	What If...?	Malekith (Voice)	Episode: "What If... Howard the Duck Got Hitched?"; Replaced Christopher Eccleston

=== Film ===
Year	Title	Role
2011	All God's Creatures	Sam
2015	The Final Girls	Bloodbath Trailer VO (voice)
2018	Radium Girls	Radio Announcer

=== Video games ===
Year	Title	Voice role	Notes
2012	The Dark Knight Rises: The Mobile Game	Alfred Pennyworth, Thomas Wayne	
2018	World of Warcraft: Battle for Azeroth	Highmountain Tauren / Undead Drust Monster	Uncredited
2021	The Elder Scrolls Online	Mehrunes Dagon	
2025	Dune Awakening	Barden	

=== Theme park attractions ===
Year	Title	Voice role
2024	Country Bear Jamboree	Max
