= Cats and Peachtopia =

2018 Chinese animated fantasy film

- Chinese theatrical release poster
- 猫与桃花源
- Directed by: Gary Wang
- Written by: Gary Wang
- Produced by: Zhou Yu; Ye Yuan
- Cinematography: Rui Xu
- Edited by: Ji Zhao
- Music by: Haowei Guo
- Production company: Light Chaser Animation Studios
- Distributed by: Beijing Culture
- Release date: 5 April 2018
- Running time: 105 minutes
- Country: China
- Languages: Mandarin; English

Cats and Peachtopia (simplified Chinese: 猫与桃花源; traditional Chinese: 貓與桃花源), released in some regions as Cats, is a 2018 Chinese animated adventure comedy-drama fantasy film directed and written by Gary Wang, produced by Light Chaser Animation Studios. The film follows a cat named Blanket who embarks on an adventure to find his son who's thinking about the cat's paradise.

Cats was originally released in China on 5 April 2018.

== Plot ==
Blanket, a bluish-grey kitten adopted by a girl, is curious about the outside world, having been told stories about it by a stray cat living with him. He leaves his apartment to explore, but after nearly freezing to death and eventually being found by his owner, decides to never go outside again.

Years later, Blanket is an adult cat with an orange and white tabby son named Cape. Cape, curious about the outside world, peppers his dad with questions about what it's like, but Blanket dismisses them. Cape's curiosity about Peachtopia grows even further when Blanket tells him his mom is there. Determined to reach Peachtopia and find his mom, Cape constructs a rocket glider and successfully escapes the apartment, making his way across the city and ending up near a factory where he nearly escapes a gang of raccoons.

Blanket and Mack, a macaw that Blanket's owner adopted after Cape's birth, follow Cape to the mountain where Blanket said Peachtopia was located. Meanwhile, Cape comes across a trailer that houses various animals, including the same stray that Blanket had met as a kitten. The raccoons track Cape to the trailer, where its leader questions the stray. The stray, however, has hidden Cape, and the raccoon leaves. The stray confirms to Cape that Peachtopia exists and says that he gave Blanket a necklace when the latter was a kitten—the same necklace that Cape now wears. Excited, Cape asks more questions about Peachtopia, but the stray discourages him, saying that Peachtopia, and the world beyond it, is too dangerous.

Arriving at the mountain, Blanket and Mack find a compound where they meet a deer, an antelope, and a dog engaged in meditation. The animals tell Blanket and Mack about a glass factory they say is too dangerous for animals, and ask them if they want to stay with them instead. Blanket politely refuses, while Mack's overzealousness gets them both ejected from the compound.

Still wanting to find Peachtopia, Cape is captured and taken to the factory, where he meets a gibbon he met earlier. The gibbon says that on the last day of the month, one of the captured animals is made into a mold of a glass statue. When the workers arrive, they look over the captured animals and finally select Cape, but find he doesn't have the necklace. Frustrated, the owner orders all the animals to be made into glass molds, one at a time.

Meanwhile, having met the stray again, Blanket learns about Cape and relates what happened to Cape's mom. She had fallen off a window ledge at the apartment during a thunderstorm but unfortunately did not survive. Mack manages to locate Cape and lets him know his dad is looking for him. Blanket and Mack leave to find Cape, while Blanket leaves the necklace—which the stray had retrieved from Cape—with the stray.

Arriving at the factory, Blanket is horrified to see his son tossed into an incinerator. Cape escapes just in time to see Blanket and Mack captured. He tries to locate them, but the stray stops him, revealing the truth about his mom. Determined to continue anyway, Cape finds his dad, where they and the stray—along with help from the raccoons' leader—free the animals, sacrificing the necklace in the process. The stray, however, says the only thing special about the necklace was the inspiration it—and he—had initially given the factory's owner to make the sculptures before the stray left.

The group reaches Peachtopia, a lush valley filled with peach trees. As they celebrate around a campfire, Cape runs off. Blanket finds him, saying he wants to return to the apartment but encourages Cape to stay. Even though he knows his mom isn't in Peachtopia, Cape stays, along with the stray and raccoon leader, while Blanket and Mack return.

In the post-credits scene, all the animals move to Blanket and Cape's apartment, while Cape is exploring through a space station.

== Voice cast ==
- Dermot Mulroney as Blanket
- Nicole Tompkins as Cape
- Nick Guerra as Biggie
- Vladimir Caamaño as Antelope
- Jonathan Katz as Gibbon
- Brittany Curran as Goat

== Reception ==
The film earned $1,658,338 on its opening weekend and finished with a total gross of $3,424,207.
