= List of animated feature films of the 2010s =

The following are lists of animated feature films first released in the 2010s.

- List of animated feature films of 2010
- List of animated feature films of 2011
- List of animated feature films of 2012
- List of animated feature films of 2013
- List of animated feature films of 2014
- List of animated feature films of 2015
- List of animated feature films of 2016
- List of animated feature films of 2017
- List of animated feature films of 2018
- List of animated feature films of 2019

== See also ==
- List of highest-grossing animated films of the 2010s
