= Green Snake (2021 film) =

- Theatrical release poster
- Chinese: 白蛇2：青蛇劫起
- Directed by: Amp Wong
- Written by: Damao
- Produced by: Cui Di
- Starring: Tang Xiaoxi; Wai Wai
- Music by: Guo Haowei
- Production companies: Light Chaser Animation Studios; Alibaba Pictures; Tianjin Maoyan Weiying Culture Media; Bilibili
- Distributed by: Alibaba Pictures; Tianjin Maoyan Weiying Culture Media; Netflix
- Release date: 23 July 2021
- Running time: 132 minutes
- Country: China
- Language: Mandarin
- Box office: $90 million

Green Snake, known in China as White Snake 2: The Tribulation of the Green Snake (Chinese: 白蛇二：青蛇劫起; pinyin: Báishé: Qīngshé Jiéqǐ), is a 2021 Chinese adult animated fantasy film directed by Amp Wong, with animation production by Light Chaser Animation, Alibaba Pictures, Tianjin Maoyan Weiying Culture Media and Bilibili. It is the sequel to 2019's White Snake. The film was inspired by the Chinese folktale Legend of the White Snake and was released in China on 23 July 2021.

The third film, White Snake: Afloat, which is a sequel of the first film and a prequel to this film, was released in 2024.

== Synopsis ==
Verta the green snake-demon must find a way to escape from the modern Shura City of mortals, in order to rescue her elder sister Blanca the white snake from the demon-slaying monk Fahai without her demonic abilities.

== Plot ==
At Zhenjiang, the snake-demon sisters, Blanca the white snake and Verta the green snake, challenge the demon-slaying monk, Fahai, to rescue Blanca's husband, Xu Xian. They are defeated, Blanca's hairpin wand gets destroyed and she gets imprisoned under Leifeng Pagoda. Verta blames Xian for being weak and useless, as well as Blanca for not choosing a stronger husband. Verta gets overpowered again and gets sucked into a portal.

Verta wakes up, without her demonic powers, in a modern dystopian city called Asuraville, a place that imprisons creatures from many different eras. She meets a woman named Sun, who helps her adjust to the modern world, and a mysterious masked man with amnesia, who saves them. The main enemies in Asuraville are an army of Ox-Heads & Horse-Faces, led by the Ox Leader who seeks to conquer the city. Sun is killed by the Ox's army, but Verta is saved by the Raksha army, led by a man named Simon, whom Verta gets smitten with.

Simon takes her to All-Good Market to meet the owner, who turns out to be the fox-demon. Verta also meets the masked man again. The fox-demon explains that everyone gets sent here because they have an obsession. The only way to leave is to let it go by discarding their token and jumping into the Pool of Release, but it makes you forget what you cared about and drains your will. Not wanting to forget Blanca, Verta doesn't do it, while the masked man can't remember his obsession. She lets him join them in gratitude for saving her.

Back at Raksha territory, the Ox's army kills Simon's army. While outrunning some evil spirits, the masked man gets stuck and Verta tries to help him, but Simon abandons them upon seeing them as dead weight. The pair survive anyway. Verta learns a lesson that in love strength doesn’t matter, having a good heart does, accepting that her sister was right. The masked man removes his mask, revealing his face resembles Blanca, indicating that he's a reincarnation of her from another era. They go back to the market, with Simon there too, to ask the fox-demon for an alternate way of getting out. She tells them about the Wish Bridge, which is harder, but doesn't cost anything. The Ox's army invades the market. Simon apologizes to Verta and attempts to fight the Ox. He dealt what should have been the decisive blow but it is revealed that the Ox has an impenetrable barrier placed on him by Fahai, and gets killed. Then, the masked man's Blanca face is revealed to be a fake, given by the Ox to use him as a spy. Verta then decides to stop relying on others and focus on getting stronger herself. Despite Verta’s anger, the masked man proves he's still on her side.

On a bus to the Wish Bridge, Verta must first survive the Black Wind Tunnel to make it crossable. In the tunnel, she battles Fahai for 20 years (1 day in Asuraville) until she kills him and destroys the Pagoda, thus ensuring Blanca's freedom in the human world. The pair race to the bridge against the Ox, now without Fahai's protection, who gets bitten and turned into an evil spirit. When they almost don't make it, the masked man lets himself become an evil spirit so he can fly Verta to the exit, sacrificing himself. All she takes with her is his bone flute.

Back in the human world, 1,000 years have passed and Verta still can't find Blanca. She sees the Pagoda has been rebuilt and its treasures have been put in an exhibition. She finds the pieces of Blanca's hairpin with one missing. She reclaims the pieces, puts them together, and adds the bone flute to it, restoring it. Verta realizes the masked man was a reincarnation of Blanca after all and she was his obsession. As she cries, a female voice says her name. Verta happily sees its Blanca.

In the mid-credits scene, the fox-demon meets with the river monster under the same bridge, where he gives her a severed fox tail. She states that her enemy is near and she must plot her revenge.

== Voice cast ==
- Tang Xiaoxi (Mandarin), Vivian Lu (English), Hiroko Watanabe (Japanese) as Verta (Xiao Qing)
- Wai Wai as the Masked Man
- Wei Chao (Mandarin), Jason Jin (English) as Sima (Simon)
- Zhao Mingzhou as Niutou Sect leader
- Xiaopu Zheng (Mandarin), Faye Mata (English), Aoi Yūki (Japanese) as Baoqing Fox
- Song Xuchen as Fahai
- Qiu Qiu as Sister Sun
- Zhang Biyu as the Spider Goblin
- Zhang Zhe (Mandarin), Stephanie Sheh (English), Suzuko Mimori (Japanese) as Blanca (Xiao Bai)
- Yang Tianxiang as Xu Xian
- Lin Qiang as the Scholar
- Baomu Zhongyang as the Muscle Man

== Release ==
Green Snake was released throughout China on 23 July 2021. As of 1 December 2021, it's available on Netflix in the U.S.

== Reception ==
Green Snake earned a total of 200 million yuan ($30.86 million) in its first three days of release.

== Accolades ==
Date	Award	Category	Recipient(s) and nominee(s)	Result	Notes
2021	34th Golden Rooster Awards	Best Animation	Green Snake	Won	
