= White Snake (film) =

- Chinese theatrical release poster

Chinese name
- Traditional Chinese: 白蛇：緣起
- Simplified Chinese: 白蛇：缘起
- Literal meaning: White Snake: The Origin
Transcriptions
Standard Mandarin
- Hanyu Pinyin: Báishé: Yuánqǐ
Yue: Cantonese
- Jyutping: Baak6se4: Jyun4hei2
- Directed by: Amp Wong; Zhao Ji
- Written by: Damao
- Produced by: Gary Wang; Gillian Zhao; Cui Di
- Starring: Zhang Zhe; Yang Tianxiang
- Narrated by: Cheng Yin
- Music by: Guo Haowei
- Production companies: Light Chaser Animation Studios; Warner Bros. Far East
- Distributed by: Warner Bros. Pictures; Joy Pictures
- Release date: January 11, 2019
- Running time: 99 minutes
- Countries: China; United States
- Languages: Mandarin; English
- Budget: CN¥80 million (US$11.2 million)
- Box office: CN¥447 million (US$64.5 million)

White Snake (simplified Chinese: 白蛇：缘起; traditional Chinese: 白蛇：緣起; pinyin: Báishé: Yuánqǐ; Wade–Giles: Pai^{2}shê^{2}: Yüan^{2}ch'ih^{3}; lit. 'White Snake: The Origin') is a 2019 adult animated fantasy film directed by Amp Wong and Zhao Ji, with animation production by Light Chaser Animation. The film was inspired by the Chinese folktale Legend of the White Snake and was released in China on January 11, 2019. A sequel, Green Snake, was announced in 2020, and was released on July 23, 2021.

The protagonist is a young adult white snake-demon Blanca (Bai Suzhen) who has taken on the appearance of a lovely human woman. She loses her memories while on a mission to assassinate a Daoist sorcerer, and is saved by a snake hunter. The two eventually fall in love, which strongly displeases her younger sister, Verta (Xiaoqing), the green snake-demon.

The film has been featured in festivals including Annecy International Animation Film Festival, Fantasia International Film Festival, BFI London Film Festival, Sitges Film Festival, Warsaw International Film Festival, and Animation Is Film.

== Plot ==
The story begins with two sisters in a traditional Chinese bath, where they both speak of immortality. It then shows that same mysterious woman (named Blanca) while she was on a mission to assassinate a Tang general. However, she is caught and is involved in a magical battle which results in her submerging into water and losing her memories. She is rescued by a man, Xuan (Xu Xian), who takes her to his home, Snake Catcher village, where the villagers catch snakes for the general, as snakes were thought to aid in immortality. Reluctant at first, Blanca is skeptical about Xuan. However, after spending some time with him (and with the reveal that she has magic powers) she starts to fall for him.

They find a jade hair pin which brings back some memories when it is then revealed, that the hairpin too is magical. Xuan reads the inscription, which indicates it was made at "special jade workshop". He and Blanca go journey there together.

Meanwhile, there is a cavern of snake-demon people, who are oppressed by the general. It is revealed that Blanca's sister is alive, a soldier for the Snake master. A snake had previously seen the two together, deeming Blanca a traitor as she is with a snake-catcher. Her younger sister Verta argues otherwise and says that she will find and return her, whilst also engaging in an insurance policy- if she is not back with Blanca in three days, then the Death Scales embedded in her will explode and kill her. Back with Xuan and Blanca, after a struggle on sea with another snake-demon- Blanca is forced to reveal her demon form, revealing to Xuan that she is in fact a demon. However he disregards this fact and the two bond.

Later they eventually get to Special Jade Workshop, owned by a fox-demon who makes all types of magical weaponry. The fox-demon explains that Blanca brought her the wand to let her use it instead of the original owner. The fox-demon explains that Blanca was warned that using the jade wand could have consequences, such as the memory loss.

After leaving the workshop, Xuan and Blanca return to the Snake Catcher Villager. Verta confronts Blanca and Xuan and tries to get Blanca to return with her. Verta identifies Xuan as a snake catcher and tries to attack him. Blanca defends him and the two sisters fight. During the fight, Xuan and Blanca fall into a hidden underground temple.

While looking at a Daoist altar in the temple, Blanca's memories are triggered. She is shaken by the events and Xuan comforts her—this leads to a moment of intimacy between them. They start kissing, she takes off her robe, and they fall to the floor kissing. Afterward, Xuan and Blanca leave the temple to find Verta waiting. Blanca reveals that her memories have been returned and says she will return to the snake demon fold. She says to Xuan that their differences (human and demon) are too great. He asks her to wait for him and leaves to find a way for them to be together.

Later at the fox-demon workshop, Xuan agrees to become a low-level demon in order to be with Blanca. Workshop mistress does turn him into a demon with a dog tail, but warns that Xuan will be of the weakest kind and will never grow stronger, and that humans will likely kill him on sight.

In the meantime, the Dark General's second in command attempts to capture Blanca for his master, and nearly succeeds. Out of desperation, Blanca uses the magic wand again, absorbing the daoist's powers and turning into a giant python. Knowing that the General will now march onto the Snake Catcher Village, where the snakes are hiding, she intends to kill him there, fighting through his forts and armies. Xuan barely catches up with her, but Blanca does not heed his call to stop. Verta then warns Xuan that in the battle to come, he, a demon too now, will have to choose a side.

Xuan tries to warn the Village, but the Snake Catchers now see him as a demon and do not listen. The Dark General arrives, eager to conquer the snakes, but hearing of Blanca's acquired power, allows Xuan one final attempt to talk to her. Xuan confesses his love to Blanca and offers her to escape to the lands beyond, living together and without any more humans or wars; she almost subsides, but in the last moment the Dark General's magical trap binds them both to the ground. Dark General intends to harvest their essence, as he has found the secret of immortality: consuming spirits of demons, making them unable to reincarnate, but prolonging his life and fueling his magic.

Verta manages to trick the General into absorbing her soul first, which also transfers the cursed Death Scales onto him. This distracts the General long enough for the Snake Master to join the battle and for snakes to bind the General's soldiers in combat. Eventually, Blanca, Xuan, Verta and Snake Master defeat the General. However, seeing how much power the daoist magic can offer, Snake Master uses it to absorb the spirits of her own army and become the most powerful demon in existence, then attempting to kill Blanca and Verta for betrayal. Xuan tricks the Snake Master by luring her into the General's magical trap, now binding her as the magic saps her soul away. With her strength almost gone and no way out of the trap, Blanca uses the jade wand one last time, saving Xuan's spirit and memories in it and escaping with Verta. In the present, 500 years later, Blanca and Verta, now remembering the story, decide to go out of their cave and search for Xuan's reincarnation so he and Blanca can be together again.

Many years later, a human sees the two sisters at the port, and when Blanca accidentally drops the jade hair pin, picks it up and introduces himself, causing Blanca to recognize him as Xuan's reincarnation. In the mid-credit scene, the fox-demon from the shop arrives to the same port delivering a box to a mysterious river monster under the bridge.

== Cast ==
- Zhang Zhe (Mandarin), Stephanie Sheh (English), Suzuko Mimori (Japanese) as Blanca (Chinese: 小白; pinyin: Xiǎo Bái lit. "Little White" or Bai Suzhen)
- Yang Tianxiang (Mandarin), Paul Yen (English), Daisuke Sakuma (Japanese) as Ah Xuan (Chinese: 阿宣; pinyin: Ā Xuān or Xu Xian)
- Tang Xiaoxi (Mandarin), Vivian Lu (English), Ayane Sakura (Japanese) as Verta (Xiaoqing lit. "Little Green")
- He Zhang (Mandarin), Matthew Moy (English), Tomokazu Sugita (Japanese) as Dudou/Brother-in-law
- Xiaopu Zheng (Mandarin), Faye Mata (English), Aoi Yūki (Japanese) as Baoqing Fox
- Wei Liu (Mandarin), Karen Huie (English), Takako Honda (Japanese) as Snake Master
- Yaohan Zhang (Mandarin), James Sie (English) as Dark General (High Daoist in the original version) and Village Chief
- Boheng Zhang (Mandarin), Vincent Rodriguez III (English) as Little General
- David Chen (English) as Narrator and Boatman
- Kaiji Tang (English) as Chang Pan
- Ewan Chung (English) as Snake Scout

== Production ==
Warner Bros. Far East has rights in China and is credited as a co-producer. The studio is in negotiations for distribution rights in other major territories.

== Release ==
The film was released throughout China on 11 January 2019 and remained in theatres for the 2019 Chinese New Year season.

=== International ===
In France, the film premiered at Annecy International Animation Film Festival.

In the United States and Canada, GKIDS has licensed the film for a fall release, in both Mandarin with English subtitles and an English-language dub.

In Los Angeles, the film won the Golden Angel for "Best Chinese & American Co-Production Animation Film" at the Chinese American Film Festival.

In Japan, the movie was later premiere in 2021 with Japanese dub. Snow Man from Johnny's late provided theme song called Yuan for Japanese version. D4DJ Groovy Mix later including Yuan for limited time.

== Reception ==
The review aggregator website Rotten Tomatoes reported that 70% of critics have given the film a positive review based on 23 reviews, with an average rating of 6.6/10.

On Metacritic, the film has a weighted average score of 60 out of 100 based on 6 critic reviews, indicating "mixed or average reviews".

In its review, Variety states "First-time feature writer Da Mao and debuting feature co-directors Zhao Ji and Amp Wong strike a pleasing balance between thunderous action scenes and appealing romance."

One of Us praised the movie for its visual style however noting that "story doesn't live up to the spectacular animation".

== Sequel ==
The studio announced the sequel in 2020; the sequel was titled White Snake 2: The Tribulation of the Green Snake and with the teaser trailer release in February, the sequel was released on July 23, 2021, in China and was later released on Netflix internationally on December 1, 2021, as Green Snake.

In 2020, the studio announced the sequel, White Snake: Afloat, and the sequel was released in China on August 10, 2024.
