= Tea Pets =

2017 Chinese animated film

- Theatrical release poster
- Chinese: 阿唐奇遇
- Directed by: Gary Wang
- Screenplay by: Gary Wang
- Produced by: Yuan Ye; Yu Zhou
- Production companies: Light Chaser Animation Studios; Dadi Films; Youman Cartoon
- Distributed by: Dadi Films; China Film Group Corporation; Hengdian World Studios; Jinyi Film and Television
- Release dates: 20 May 2017 (Seattle International Film Festival); 16 July 2017 (China)
- Running time: 93 minutes
- Country: China
- Language: Mandarin
- Box office: $5.057 million

Tea Pets (Chinese: 阿唐奇遇), also released as Toys & Pets, is a 2017 Chinese 3D animated comedy film written and directed by Gary Wang, and produced by Yuan Ye and Yu Zhou. It was produced by Wang's studio Light Chaser Animation Studios, in collaboration with Dadi Films and Youman Cartoon. Tea Pets had its world premiere at the 2017 Seattle International Film Festival on 20 May 2017, and was released in Chinese cinemas on 21 July 2017. It grossed $5,057,715 at the worldwide box office.

== Premise ==
A group of ceramic tea pets who live in a tea shop, taking pride in changing colour when tea is poured near them. However, Ah Tang (named Tea Sprout in English dubbing) is the only tea pet who will not change color no matter how the tea is poured. The only main one in the group is a small Squirrel that doesn’t talk, as he’s the only one that doesn’t talk when tea is poured into him. One day, the supply of customers call H Tang junk After he scalded their hands when he is poured with very hot tea.

One day, Xiaolai (named Babou in English dubbing), a magical robot from the future, accidentally crashes into the tea shop. Ah Tang sees this as a glimmer of hope to find a way to make his color beautiful. So, Ah Tang convinces Xiaolai to join him on an adventurous journey to find the future and try to find the secret to changing Ah Tang's colour. The tea pets come along for the ride.

During their Journey, they Encounter a cat named Dragon Bell that Attacks them. After distracting the cat with a mint leaf, Ah Tang sneak into the house with the help from Capper and Humpy, where they journey into the fridge to find tea. During this, Capper sneezes and Humpy falls into a teacup, where he encounters Jake and Pat, two brown rats looking for Xiaolai. They lie that they are professional robot builders, so they are able to find her. Scrubs appears, and the three escape where they reunite with Capper and Ah Tang, Who reluctantly allowed the rats to follow them.

After staying in a sewer where Ah Tang and Xiaolai bond, they continue on the journey. After tricking dragon Bell into jumping into the pool to find his milk, they use towels to land at Chuckles’s place, who is in all the worn out penguin that had never been used. While there, she tricks them into being nice and serving for her. Gerold says to Ah Tang They are more benefits of staying here, causing him to leave, displeased.

After Ciaolai Catches up to him, they fall from a nearby toy plane and into a toy kite. In the kite, they learned it was made from a plane created by the tea, pet store owner. Ah Tang Was born from it, where he was carved, but soon sold after the log cried out in pain. Frustrated thatXiaolai Lie to him about always believing him, Ah Tang Runs away, but ends up captured by the robot builders.

End up, captured by the brown rats, who revealed that their boss was working for them. The boss Was revealed to be chuckles, who is frustrated because tea was never poured into her. As a result, She had tricked the rats into her and forced any pet from the tea pet store To come to her. As a result, she trapped them in our room that will instantly flood with water. Xiaolai Escapes and using a In order to convince Ah Tamg To not give up, the pair work together to reach the room as it is flooding.

Chuckles Tries to end up falling into spinning. After a chain reaction, she ends up falling into a formula And loses the baby bottle that she kept for herself, giving them to the brown rats. The two ways to save the pets as the room has filled to the brim, managing to open The drain because of Ah Tang’s Ability to breathe underwater. The pets are sucked in and chuckles, freeze herself, revealing to be oversized. The drain begins to flood and explodes, making her believe that they are gone. However, they have survived by sneaking into a nearby toybox. They later match to defeat chuckles by making her stuck, and Xiaolai Sacrifices herself by allowing herself to be crushed to launch many of the tea pets safety.

Ah Tang Is miserable over the loss of his favorite robot, but they all managed to build her after learning she had a special chip. Later, tongue now accepts being able to have tea into him and spend time with Xiaolai, While the brown rats end up adopted and sell proteins of money In order to open their first amazing bank.

== Release ==
Tea Pets had its world premiere at the 2017 Seattle International Film Festival on 20 May 2017 as one of ten Chinese feature films that premiered as part of the second China Stars Showcase series. It premiered in China on 16 July, before being released in cinemas nationwide on 21 July. In China, it grossed $4,552,351, and was later released in several other countries, ending with a worldwide box office gross of $5,057,715.
