= Tudou =

Chinese video-sharing website headquartered in Shanghai

Tudou, Inc.

- Screenshot Screenshot of Tudou home page
- Company type: Subsidiary
- Website type: Video hosting service
- Available in: English
- Founded: February 15, 2005; 21 years ago
- Headquarters: Shanghai, China
- Key people: Gary Wang, CEO; Sam Lai, CFO; Grace Wang, CAO; Sarah Jiang, CCO; Evelyn Wang, CSO; Deng Wei, VP; Anita Huang, VP; Yongzhu Song, VP; Yu Bin, VP
- Parent: Youku
- Website: www.tudou.com
- Registration: Optional (required to upload)
- Launched: April 15, 2005; 21 years ago
- Current status: Active

Tudou, Inc. (simplified Chinese: 土豆网; traditional Chinese: 土豆網; pinyin: Tǔdòu Wǎng; lit. 'Potato Net') is a Chinese video-sharing website headquartered in Shanghai, China, where users can upload, view and share video clips. Tudou went live on April 15, 2005 and by September 2007 served over 55 million videos each day.

In 2007 Tudou was one of the world's largest bandwidth users, moving more than 1 Petabyte per day to 7 million users. YouTube serves a larger number of videos per day, but the average Tudou video is longer in duration, meaning the total number of minutes of video being streamed daily from Tudou is significantly larger - about 15 billion minutes vs. 3 billion for YouTube.

The Shanghai-based service uses Adobe Flash technology to publish more than 50,000 new videos each day, including amateur content such as videoblogging and original videos, movie and TV clips, and music videos. Unregistered users can watch videos on the site, while registered users are permitted to upload an unlimited number of videos, using on-line and Windows-based upload tools.

On March 12, 2012, it was announced that Youku reached an agreement to acquire Tudou in a stock-for-stock transaction, with the new company being named Youku Tudou Inc.

== History ==
Tudou was founded by Gary Wang and Dutchman Marc van der Chijs, whom Wang met while at Bertelsmann Media Group in China. The name Tudou is Chinese Pinyin (Romanized Chinese) for Potato. It was previously known as Toodou.com, and changed its domain name to Tudou.com in August 2006 when that domain became available. According to CEO Wang, the name comes from the English idiom "couch potato". He stated that his goal was to move couch potatoes from the television screen to the computer screen.

Prior to Tudou, Wang lived in the United States and returned to China to work for multi-national companies. Tudou was originally conceptualized as a video blogging company and the site launched on April 15, 2005, in its current format, several months after YouTube.

Like many technology startups, Tudou was started on a small budget with a raw technology team. It was initially self-financed at about $100,000, then in 2005 raised a $500,000 seed round. Its first major funding round was in 2006 for $8.5 million from IDG China, GGV Capital (formerly Granite Global Ventures), and JAFCO Asia. Tudou's second funding was in early 2007 for $19 million and was led by Boston-based General Catalyst Partners and Shanghai-based Capital Today, with other existing investors participating. The fourth round of funding was on April 28, 2008, for $57 million from existing investors IDG Technology Venture Investment (IDGVC), Granite Global Ventures and General Catalyst Partners, and also included a member of the Rockefeller family. The most recent funding was announced on August 5, 2010 for $50 million from the Temasek Holdings and existing investors.

=== Rapid growth ===
During the summer of 2007, Nielsen/NetRatings reported that Tudou was one of the fastest growing websites on the Web, growing from 131 million to 360 million video clips per week in just three months. According to a July 16, 2007, survey, 55 million video clips are viewed daily on Tudou, with an additional 20,000 new videos uploaded every 24 hours. Neilsen's measurements indicate the website averages nearly 40 million visitors per month.

According to Chinese tracking service iResearch, as of mid-2007, Tudou has over 50% of the Chinese online video market. iResearch reported Tudou reached 95 million monthly unique visitors as of June 2009, and 170 million as of June 2010.

== Funding ==
Tudou completed its financial fund series A to E between year 2005 to 2010 in November 2005, April 2006, April 2007, April 2008, and August 2010 respectively. A total of US$135 million was raised from a roster of venture capital organizations including IDG Ventures China, Jafco Asia, GGV Capital, General Catalyst Partners, Capital Today, KTB, JAIC, Cyber Agent, Venrock, Crescent Point, and Temasek Holdings.

== Recent events ==
In July 2007, Tudou introduced one of the world's first large-scale video advertising systems for video sites, several months ahead of YouTube. In late September 2007, Intel and Tudou announced a partnership to explore wireless video sharing technologies and video applications for mobile devices. Tudou also agreed to increase its use of Intel CPUs in its rapidly growing video encoder server farms. Intel will also promote its products through the Tudou advertising system.

In December 2007, Tudou introduced videos in the H.264 format, providing higher quality and standards-based video.

In the aftermath of the 2008 Sichuan earthquake on May 12, the service of the website was suspended until May 21 due to the period of national mourning.

On September 10, 2008, Tudou received its license from SARFT.

== Copyright and video review ==
=== Copyright ===
A portion of Tudou's content comes from commercial sources and is not user-generated. The company says that the Chinese often go to Tudou for TV-like saq-media, instead of using their televisions. Starting 2008 Tudou launched licensed content acquisition and partnership programs aggregating selective premium professional contents. Nevertheless, Tudou still comes under criticism for its disregard of some copyright policies.

=== Video review ===
Tudou's in-house reviewers watch, approve, and categorize all uploaded videos. The reviewers screen for inappropriate content such as pornography and categorize / tag each video.

== Technical notes ==
=== Video format ===
Tudou's video playback technology is based on Macromedia's Flash Player. This technology allows the site to display videos with quality comparable to more established video playback technologies (such as Windows Media Player, QuickTime and RealPlayer) that generally require the user to download and install a web browser plugin in order to view video. Flash also requires a plug-in, but the Flash 7 plug-in is generally considered to be present on approximately 90% of online computers. The video can also be played back with gnash(cannot) or VLC. It has pixel dimensions of 320 by 240 (4:3) or 352 by 264 (16:9), depending on the aspect ratio of the source video. Videos run at 25 frames per second with a maximum data rate of 300 kbit/s.

Tudou accepts uploaded videos in a variety of formats, including .WMV, .AVI, .MOV, MPEG and .MP4.

Video can be seen in windowed mode or full screen mode; it is possible to switch the mode during the viewing of any video without reloading it because of the full-screen function of Adobe Systems Flash Player 9.

Because of the copyright and licensing issues, some Tudou videos are blocked to international IP addresses.

=== Bandwidth ===
Tudou reports that it's one of the world's largest bandwidth users, sending over 1PB (Petabyte) of video files per day, which is nearly 100 Gbit/s of sustained traffic. The company uses a variety of proprietary and commercial content distribution networks (CDNs), such as ChinaCache to distribute videos around China.

The domain tudou.com attracted almost 10 million visitors annually by 2008 according to a Compete.com survey.

== See also ==
- QQ Video
- 56.com
- Alternative media
- Comparison of video services
- List of Internet phenomena
- User-generated content
- Viral video
- Youku
