= Gary Wang (Chinese businessman) =

Chinese businessman

- 王微
- Born: May 8, 1973 (age 53); Fuzhou, Fujian, China
- Education: Johns Hopkins University; INSEAD (MBA); Johns Hopkins University (BSc.
- Occupations: Founder and ex-CEO, Tudou.com; Founder of Light Chaser Animation Studios

Gary Wang or Wang Wei (Chinese: 王微; pinyin: Wáng Wēi; born May 8, 1973) is a Chinese businessman. He is the founder of the Chinese video sharing company Tudou.com and served as its CEO until August 2012. He is currently the founder of Light Chaser Animation Studios, an animation studio based in Beijing. Wang is also a novelist, screenwriter, and playwright. He holds a bachelor's degree in computer Science from the Johns Hopkins University, and an MBA from INSEAD.

== Career ==
=== Early professional career ===
Wang's first full-time job out of college was as a salesman of apparel snap fasteners, although he "wore an ill-fitting $90 suit and didn't know how to pronounce Christian Dior." He later moved on to a position at Hughes Electronics, where he worked from 1997 to 2001 through roles in engineering and last held the role of business development manager. After obtaining his MBA at INSEAD in 2002, Wang served as the corporate development director of Bertelsmann Group, an international media company, and also served as the managing director of Bertelsmann Online China, a company operating the e-commerce businesses of Bertelsmann Group in China, from 2003 to 2005.

=== Tudou ===
Wang launched his business career during the mid-2000s, where founded Tudou in January 2005 (a few months before YouTube), citing the tightly regulated nature of television content in China and his hope to "bridge the huge gap between those people who have creative ideas and talent, but cannot get their work out to the audience" as his primary reasons.

Wang formally launched Tudou online on April 15, 2005, and the website soon took off. Tudou started as a website hosting user-generated content (UGC), but soon expanded to include UGC, premium licensed content and content developed in-house, commonly described as a combination of the YouTube, Hulu, and HBO business models. The number of monthly unique visitors to Tudou increased from approximately 50 million in December 2007 to approximately 182 million in December 2010, and to approximately 200 million in May 2011. The number of registered users increased from approximately 35.6 million on December 31, 2008, to approximately 78.2 million as of December 31, 2010 and further to approximately 90.1 million as of June 30, 2011.

Wang took Tudou public on NASDAQ in August 2011. On March 12, 2012, Tudou and competitor Youku.com announced a merger to form Youku Tudou Inc., with Tudou valued at US$1.2 billion. Since the merger was formally completed in August 2012, Wang has retired from the new company's daily operations.

=== Light Chaser Animation Studios ===
In an interview with the Wall Street Journal on March 12, 2013, Wang announced his new project, Light Chaser Animation Studios, to produce animated feature films targeting the rapidly growing Chinese movie market, which grew by 30% in 2012 and is widely expected to overtake the U.S. market in size by 2020. He cited the lack of quality domestically produced animation content, a rapidly growing domestic market, and improving environment for movie distribution, promotion and copyrights in China as the main reasons behind his decision.

Light Chaser Animation Studios is based in Beijing, China.

== Creative career ==
Wang is also a novelist and playwright for stage and ballet. At 24, Wang wrote the novel Waiting for Summer, loosely based on his early experiences studying and living in the United States. Wang published the novel in 2006, first serially in the acclaimed Chinese literary magazine Harvest, and then as an independent work a year later. In 2011, Wang wrote The Residential Compound, a stage play about urban development and relocation in Beijing. In the same year, Wang wrote the libretto for the San Francisco Ballet's critically acclaimed RAkU, a story about a "triangle of obsession" taking place in the Tokugawa Era.

Wang is the screenwriter and director of Light Chaser Animation's first movie, Little Door Gods.
