= Sleepy =

Sleepy means feeling a need for sleep, also known as somnolence. It may also refer to:

== People ==
- Sleepy (rapper) (born 1984), a South Korean rapper part of the hip hop duo Untouchable
- Sleepy Bill Burns (1880–1953), American baseball player
- Sleepy Brown (born 1970), African American musician
- Sleepy John Estes (1899–1977), African American musician
- Sleepy Floyd (born 1960), retired American professional basketball player
- Sleepy LaBeef (1935–2019), American rockabilly musician
- Sleepy Tripp (born 1953), American racecar driver

== Arts and entertainment ==
- Sleepy (character), one of the dwarfs in the film Snow White and the Seven Dwarfs
- Sleepy (novel), by Kate Orman based on the TV series Doctor Who
- "Sleepy" (short story), an 1888 story by Anton Chekhov

== See also ==
- Sleep disorder, a medical disorder of the sleep patterns
- Rheum, the thin mucus discharged from the eyes, nose, or mouth during sleep
- Sleepy Creek, a tributary of the Potomac River, U.S.
- Sleepy Hollow (disambiguation)
- Sleepy time (disambiguation) or Sleepytime
