= Aleksey Lebedev =

Aleksey Lebedev may refer to:

- Aleksey Lebedev (luger)
- Aleksey Lebedev (screenwriter)
- Red Guardian, a Marvel Comics character with the alter ego Aleksey Lebedev
