= Weather or Not (disambiguation) =

Weather or Not is a 2018 album by Evidence.

Weather or Not may also refer to:

== Novels ==
- Weather or Not, the tenth novel in the Out & About With Pooh book series
- Weather or Not, the fifth novel in the Upside-Down Magic book series

== Television episodes ==
- "Weather or Not", season 1, episode 14 of the television series Bonkers
- "Weather or Not", the second part of season 2, episode 21 of the television series The Book of Pooh
- "Weather or Not", season 2, episode 28 of the television series Chip 'n Dale: Rescue Rangers
- "Weather or Not", season 14, episodes 3–4 of the television series Cyberchase
- "Weather or Not", the second part of season 3, episode 19 of the television series Doki
- "Weather or Not", season 1, episode 10c of the television series GoGoRiki
- "Weather or Not", the first part of season 1, episode 12 of the television series Higglytown Heroes
- "Weather or Not", season 2, episode 24 of the television series Hope & Faith
- "Weather or Not", episode 50 of the television series James Bond Jr.
- "Weather or Not", season 8, episode 8 of the television series The Loud House
- "Weather or Not", season 2, episode 7 of the television series Minnie's Bow-Toons
- "Weather or Not", episode 25 of the television series The New Casper Cartoon Show
- "Weather or Not" season 3, episode 8 of the television series Out of the Box
- "Weather or Not", the second part of episode 20 of the television series Pocket Dragon Adventures
- "Weather or Not", episode 5 of the television series Power Rangers Operation Overdrive
- "Weather or Not", an episode of the television series Sabrina the Teenage Witch
- "Weather or Not", season 2, episode 39 of the television series Super Wings
- "Weather or Not", series 2, episode 11 of the television series Thunderbirds Are Go
- "Weather or Not", series 2, episode 4 of the television series The Tony Hancock Show
- "Weather or Not", a segment of season 2, episode 4 of the television series The Tracey Ullman Show
- "Weather or Not", series 2, episode 10 of the 1997 series of The Wombles

== Other ==
- "Weather or Not", a segment on the television news show Aksyon
- "'Weather' or Not", a silent film era cartoon featuring Jerry the Tyke
- "Weather or Not", the theme of the 1986 Tanana Valley State Fair

== See also ==
- "Weather or Not, Here I Come", series 2, episode 19 of the television series Theodosia
- "The Weather or Not Matter", episode 798 of the radio drama Yours Truly, Johnny Dollar
