= Sleepy Time =

Sleepy Time or Sleepytime may refer to:

- "Sleepy Time" (SpongeBob SquarePants)
- "Sleepy Time", an episode of GoGoRiki
- "Sleepytime" (Bluey), an episode of the Australian animated series Bluey
- "Sleepytime" (song), a song from 2026 Bluey soundtrack Up Here
- Sleepytime, a brand of herbal tea blend from Celestial Seasonings
- Sleepytime, a Thoroughbred racehorse
