= List of KikoRiki episodes =

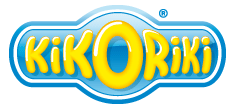

This is a list of KikoRiki episodes that have been broadcast in Russia, the United Kingdom, and the United States.

== Series overview ==
Season	Episodes	Originally released	
Season	Episodes	First released	Last released
1	104	December 22, 2003	June 1, 2008
2	112	June 1, 2008	September 3, 2012
3	71	December 22, 2011	November 8, 2018
Films		December 22, 2011	August 6, 2026
4	112	May 18, 2020	May 25, 2023
5	8	December 22, 2022	February 15, 2024

== Episodes ==
=== Season 1 (2003–08) ===
No.	English dub title (top) Russian title (bottom)	Russian air date	English air date
1	"The Bench" "The Bench! (Studio 100)" (Russian: Скамейка)	May 17, 2004	unknown
2	"A Prince for Rosa" "Pinky's Search for a Prince (Studio 100)" (Russian: Принц для Нюши)	May 20, 2004	unknown
3	"Past Year's Tale" "Happy New Year (4Kids) & Where Does The Old Year Go (Studio 100)" (Russian: Куда уходит старый год)	December 22, 2003	December 27, 2008
4	"The Plywood Sun" "Sun Spots (4Kids)" (Russian: Фанерное солнце)	May 18, 2004	November 7, 2009
5	"The Energy of Snoring" "Snore Energy (4Kids) & Snoring Power! (Studio 100)" (Russian: Энергия храпа)	May 24, 2004	October 31, 2009
6	"The Iron Nanny" "What a Chore (4Kids)" (Russian: Железная няня)	May 19, 2004	November 22, 2008
7	"The Gift of Fortune" "Reach for the Stars (4Kids) & The Unexpected Present (Studio 100)" (Russian: Подарок судьбы)	2004	October 24, 2009
8	"Who's the First" "Time Will Tell (4Kids) & Who will be the first (Studio 100)" (Russian: Кто первый)	2004	December 17, 2009
9	"The Uncultivated" "Quackleaf Blues (4Kids) & The Weed! (Studio 100)" (Russian: Некультурный)	2004	October 10, 2009
10	"The Forgotten Tale" "The Forgotten Memory (4Kids)" (Russian: Забытая история)	2004	December 6, 2008
11	"The Grand Piano" "The Piano (4Kids)" (Russian: Рояль)	2004	November 8, 2008
12	"Fast Friends" "It's About Time (4Kids) & It’s About Time! (Studio 100)" (Russian: Как собрать друзей по-быстрому)	2004	October 18, 2008
13	"The Telegraph" (Russian: Телеграф)	2004	September 27, 2008
14	"The Collection" "The Collector (4Kids) & The Strange Collection! (Studio 100)" (Russian: Коллекция)	2004	March 7, 2009
15	"Lily" "Sweet Lily (4Kids)" (Russian: Лили)	2004	November 8, 2008
16	"Memoirs of an Umbrella" "Security Umbrella (4Kids) & Fluff's Umbrella (Studio 100)" (Russian: Биография зонтика)	2004	August 29, 2009
17	"La" "Wolli's Singing Well (4Kids) & Laa! (Studio 100)" (Russian: Ля)	2004	September 26, 2009
18	"The Path to Decent Society" "Bad Manners (4Kids) & How To Join High Society! (Studio 100)" (Russian: Путь в приличное общество)	2004	October 25, 2008
19	"Rosa's Birthday" "A Gift for Rosariki (4Kids) & Pinky's Birthday (Studio 100)" (Russian: День рождения Нюши)	2004	September 27, 2008
20	"Golf" "Golf! (Studio 100)" (Russian: Гольф)	2004	September 19, 2011
21	"Flying in a Dream and in Reality" "Dreams in the Sky (4Kids) & Pin the Sleeping Pilot! (Studio 100)" (Russian: Полёты во сне и наяву)	2004	October 18, 2008
22	"The Big Event" "The Laughing Room! (Studio 100)" (Russian: Событие века)	2004	unknown
23	"How to Become a Star" "An Imaginary Enemy (Studio 100)" (Russian: Как стать звездой)	2004	unknown
24	"Krash's New Teeth" "The Lost Apology (Studio 100)" (Russian: Новые зубы Кроша)	2004	unknown
25	"BallAst" "Treasure Hunt (4Kids)" (Russian: Балласт)	2004	October 4, 2008
26	"How to Have a Good Rest" "Recipes for Life (4Kids) & Recipe For A Rest! (Studio 100)" (Russian: Рецепт хорошего отдыха)	2004	March 7, 2009
27	"Bath Procedures" "The Right To Solitude (Studio 100)" (Russian: Водные процедуры)	2004	unknown
28	"Beauty" "Pretty as a Picture (4Kids)" (Russian: Красота)	2004	September 19, 2009
29	"The Last Rainbow" "Extra! Extra! (4Kids)" (Russian: Последняя радуга)	2004	October 4, 2008
30	"The Big Race" "The Big Race! (Studio 100)" (Russian: Большие гонки)	2004	September 27, 2008
31	"Magnetism" "Magnetism! (Studio 100)" (Russian: Магнетизм)	2004	October 4, 2008
32	"The Secret Society" "Deep Dark Secrets (4Kids)" (Russian: Тайное общество)	2004	September 26, 2009
33	"What Everybody Needs" "Pyramid Scheme (4Kids) & What Everyone Needs! (Studio 100)" (Russian: Что нужно всем)	2005	October 18, 2008
34	"The Triumph of Reason" "Big Trouble (4Kids) & The Triumphant Intellectual (Studio 100)" (Russian: Торжество разума)	2005	December 6, 2008
35	"The Inner Clock" "The Dream Team (4Kids) & The Body Clock (Studio 100)" (Russian: Живые часы)	June 9, 2005	September 19, 2009
36	"The Sweetness of Honey" "Berry the Honey Bear (Studio 100)" (Russian: Это сладкое слово ‘мёд’)	2005	October 11, 2008
37	"In Sweet Harmony" "Woe is Wolli (4Kids) & Harmony Inspires Creativity (Studio 100)" (Russian: Играй, гармония)	2005	November 1, 2008
38	"Mountains and Candies" "Sweet Temptation (4Kids) & Mountains vs. Candies! (Studio 100)" (Russian: Горы и конфеты)	2005	October 17, 2009
39	"The Lucky Talisman" "The Lucky One (4Kids) & The Lucky Charm (Studio 100)" (Russian: Талисман)	2005	October 11, 2008
40	"A Story for Rosa" "Scary Stories (4Kids) & Frightening Pinky! (Studio 100)" (Russian: Страшилка для Нюши)	2005	November 1, 2008
41	"Little Big Sea" "Pollution Solution (4Kids)" (Russian: Маленькое большое море)	September 28, 2005	October 11, 2008
42	"Operation Santa Claus" "Operation Santa Claus! (Studio 100)" (Russian: Операция ‘Дед Мороз’)	2005	December 20, 2008
43	"Admirers in the Sky" "Star Gazing (4Kids) & Do stars watch us (Studio 100)" (Russian: Думают ли о Вас на звёздах)	November 1, 2005	November 15, 2008
44	"Great News" "Potential Disaster (4Kids) & Good News! (Studio 100)" (Russian: Приятные новости)	October 20, 2005	November 29, 2008
45	"The Butterfly" "Social Butterfly (4Kids)" (Russian: Бабочка)	October 21, 2005	February 28, 2009
46	"Archaeology" "Treasure Stunt (4Kids)" (Russian: Археология)	November 11, 2005	September 19, 2009
47	"Meteorology" "Weather or Not (4Kids)" (Russian: Метеорология)	November 10, 2005	November 29, 2008
48	"The Disco Dancer" "Face the Music (4Kids) & Disco Dancing Champion! (Studio 100)" (Russian: Танцор диско)	October 28, 2005	March 14, 2009
49	"Soap Opera" "Bubble or Nothing (4Kids) & A Soap Opera! (Studio 100)" (Russian: Мыльная опера)	December 8, 2005	September 5, 2009
50	"Fishing Trip" "Gone Fishing (4Kids) & The Long Fishing Expedition... (Studio 100)" (Russian: Долгая рыбалка)	November 30, 2005	August 22, 2009
51	"Remodeling is a Collective Effort" "Home Away from Home (4Kids) & Jumpy's House Remodelling (Studio 100)" (Russian: Ремонт — дело коллективное)	December 14, 2005	October 10, 2009
52	"The Promise" "Promises (4Kids) & The Promise! (Studio 100)" (Russian: Обещание)	December 15, 2005	November 22, 2008
53	"Training for a Nap" "Sleepy Time (4Kids) & The Pedagogical Poem (Studio 100)" (Russian: Педагогическая поэма)	November 22, 2005	March 14, 2009
54	"Bon Voyage, Wally!" "Sinking Feeling (4Kids) & Farewell, Fluff! (Studio 100)" (Russian: Прощай, Бараш)	January 5, 2006	March 7, 2009
55	"Beauty Queen" "The Beauty Within (4Kids) & Miss Universe (Studio 100)" (Russian: Мисс Вселенная)	January 12, 2006	October 25, 2008
56	"The Frozen Surprise" "Ice and Cool (4Kids) & Minus 41 degrees! (Studio 100)" (Russian: -41 °С)	February 27, 2006	December 6, 2008
57	"Soccer Game, 1st Half" "Just for Kicks, Pt. 1 (4Kids) & Tactics vs. Willpower Part 1 (Studio 100)" (Russian: Футбол, первый тайм)	March 29, 2006	March 21, 2009
58	"Soccer Game, 2nd Half" "Just for Kicks, Pt. 2 (4Kids) & Tactics vs. Willpower Part 2 (Studio 100)" (Russian: Футбол, второй тайм)	March 30, 2006	March 28, 2009
59	"The Chill" "Sick and Desired (4Kids) & How to catch a Cold! (Studio 100)" (Russian: ОРЗ)	March 23, 2006	March 21, 2009
60	"Dream Maker" "The Dream Maker... (Studio 100)" (Russian: Снотворец)	2006	October 31, 2009
61	"In the Beginning Was the Word" "History in the Faking (4Kids)" (Russian: В начале было слово)	April 26, 2006	October 17, 2009
62	"Barry's Hives" "Bobo and the Bees (4Kids) & Berry's Beehives (Studio 100)" (Russian: Ульи Копатыча)	April 27, 2006	February 28, 2009
63	"Lucky Stars" "Fireworks (4Kids) & Fireworks! (Studio 100)" (Russian: День справедливости)	May 24, 2006	August 29, 2009
64	"The Flash Mob Boss" "Showtime Showdown (4Kids) & Le Corps de Ballet (Studio 100)" (Russian: Кордебалет)	May 25, 2006	September 12, 2009
65	"The Gift" "From Zero to Hero (4Kids) & Pinky's Gift! (Studio 100)" (Russian: Дар)	May 31, 2006	October 24, 2009
66	"A Big Share" "Scoop (4Kids) & The One-Armed Bandit (Studio 100)" (Russian: Большой куш)	2006	September 19, 2011
67	"The Savage Clone" "Double Doco (4Kids) & The Clone! (Studio 100)" (Russian: Невоспитанный клон)	2006	November 8, 2008
68	"Maternal Instinct" "Girls and Boys (4Kids)" (Russian: Основной инстинкт)	2006	March 14, 2009
69	"Pancake Week" "Pancake Day (Studio 100)" (Russian: Масленица)	2006	September 12, 2009
70	"Enter Chikorini" "Flyin' and Lying (4Kids)" (Russian: Ежидзе)	August 28, 2006	March 28, 2009
71	"Oh, to Be a Great Poet!" "Poetry Emotion (4Kids)" (Russian: Как здорово сочинять стихи)	September 14, 2006	November 7, 2009
72	"Chiko and His Health" "Germs of Endearment (4Kids)" (Russian: Ёжик и здоровье)	September 14, 2006	September 5, 2009
73	"Bye Bye, Bibi" "Friend or Foe (4Kids)" (Russian: Биби и его папа)	2006	March 28, 2009
74	"My Precious" "Scent of a Wolli (4Kids)" (Russian: Моя прелесть)	2006	November 29, 2008
75	"Making Progress..." "A Work in Progress (4Kids)" (Russian: Двигатель прогресса)	2006	October 24, 2009
76	"The Masquerade" "The Costume Party (4Kids)" (Russian: Маскарад)	2006	February 28, 2009
77	"The Boycott" "Silent Treatment (4Kids)" (Russian: Бойкот)	2006	November 14, 2009
78	"Bibi's Vacation" "Robo's Return (4Kids)" (Russian: Каникулы Биби)	2006	December 17, 2009
79	"Space Odyssey, Part 1" "Spaced Out, Part 1 (4Kids)" (Russian: Космическая одиссея-1)	2006	October 10, 2009
80	"Space Odyssey, Part 2" "Spaced Out, Part 2 (4Kids)" (Russian: Космическая одиссея-2)	2006	October 17, 2009
81	"Bad Omens" "Tough Luck (4Kids)" (Russian: Скверная примета)	2006	October 3, 2009
82	"Private Life" "Personal Life (4Kids)" (Russian: Личная жизнь)	November 7, 2006	September 19, 2011
83	"Love Letters" "Tell It Like It Is (4Kids)" (Russian: Роман в письмах)	March 15, 2007	December 18, 2009
84	"Add Snow, Subtract a Fir Tree" "Snow Daze (4Kids)" (Russian: Плюс снег, минус ёлка)	April 17, 2007	December 13, 2008
85	"Her Name Was Rosa" "A Rosariki By Any Other Name (4Kids)" (Russian: Её звали Нюша)	March 15, 2007	September 5, 2009
86	"Chiko in the Fog" "Movie Madness (4Kids)" (Russian: Ёжик в туманности)	August 15, 2007	November 22, 2008
87	"Locked Up" "On a Roll (4Kids)" (Russian: Взаперти)	March 15, 2007	September 26, 2009
88	"Line of Fortune" "Fate Expectations (4Kids)" (Russian: Линии судьбы)	August 15, 2007	September 12, 2009
89	"The Truffle" "Truffle Trouble (4Kids)" (Russian: Трюфель)	August 15, 2007	February 21, 2009
90	"The Realist" "Picture Perfect (4Kids)" (Russian: Реалист)	August 15, 2007	August 22, 2009
91	"The Anonym" "Birthday Bash (4Kids)" (Russian: Аноним)	August 15, 2007	unknown
92	"What Wishes May Come" "Bad Hair Day (4Kids)" (Russian: Куда приводят желания)	August 15, 2007	November 15, 2008
93	"The Ends of the Earth" "Flat Chance (4Kids)" (Russian: Край Земли)	August 15, 2007	August 29, 2009
94	"A Run of Bad Luck" "Down on His Luck (4Kids)" (Russian: Полоса невезения)	November 30, 2007	October 31, 2009
95	"Gastronomy" "Cooking Up a Storm (4Kids)" (Russian: Кулинария)	December 1, 2007	November 7, 2009
96	"Houdini's Secret" "The Magic Trick (4Kids)" (Russian: Секрет Гудини)	December 2, 2007	October 25, 2008
97	"The Room of Melancholy" "Misery Loves Company (4Kids)" (Russian: Комната грусти)	December 3, 2007	March 21, 2009
98	"Out of Balance" "Topsy Turvy (4Kids)" (Russian: Вестибулярный аппарат)	December 4, 2007	November 14, 2009
99	"Hero of Pluto" "Pluto's Hero (4Kids)" (Russian: Герой Плутона)	December 5, 2007	February 21, 2009
100	"The Meaning of Life" "Destination Frustration (4Kids)" (Russian: Смысл жизни)	December 4, 2007	November 14, 2009
101	"Real Values" "A Valuable Lesson (4Kids)" (Russian: Настоящие ценности)	August 23, 2008	December 17, 2009
102	"In Pursuit of Happiness" "Happy Daze (4Kids)" (Russian: Счастьемёт)	April 24, 2008	October 3, 2009
103	"The Labyrinth" "Maze Craze (4Kids)" (Russian: Лабиринт)	April 24, 2008	December 18, 2009
104	"Why Do We Need Friends?" "A Hair Scare (4Kids)" (Russian: Зачем нужны друзья)	June 1, 2008	November 1, 2009

=== Season 2 (2008–12) ===
No.	English dub title (top) Russian title (bottom)	Russian air date	English air date
105 (1)	"House of Mirrors" "The Funhouse (4Kids)" (Russian: Комната смеха)	June 1, 2008	February 21, 2009
106 (2)	"New Year Mail" "Holiday Mail (Studio 100)" (Russian: Новогодняя почта)	December 4, 2007	unknown
107 (3)	"Self Defense" "Tae Kwon Pogo (4Kids)" (Russian: Самооборона без противника)	December 4, 2007	August 22, 2009
108 (4)	"The Most Important Thing" (Russian: Самое главное)	August 30, 2008	unknown
109 (5)	"The Lost Apology" "Who's Sorry Now? (4Kids)" (Russian: Утерянные извинения)	June 1, 2008	October 3, 2009
110 (6)	"The Right to Be Lonely" "Me, Myself, and Island (4Kids)" (Russian: Право на одиночество)	April 24, 2008	November 15, 2008
111 (7)	"It Can't Be True" "That Can't Be (Studio 100)" (Russian: Не может быть)	June 1, 2008	unknown
112 (8)	"April Fool's Day" (Russian: 1 апреля)	June 1, 2008	unknown
113 (9)	"Lullaby for Hedgehog" "Chiko's Lullaby (Studio 100)" (Russian: Колыбельная для Ёжика)	June 1, 2008	unknown
114 (10)	"All Alone" "All By Myself (Studio 100)" (Russian: Без никого)	June 1, 2008	unknown
115 (11)	"Red Letter Days" (Russian: Красный день календаря)	June 1, 2008	unknown
116 (12)	"Forget Everything" (Russian: Забыть всё)	June 1, 2008	unknown
117 (13)	"The Game" "Docoriki Playing Games (4Kids)" (Russian: Игра)	November 7, 2008	August 8, 2012
118 (14)	"The Marathoner" (Russian: Марафонец)	September 11, 2008	unknown
119 (15)	"Olympic Champion" (Russian: Наш олимпийский чемпион)	September 11, 2008	unknown
120 (16)	"The Commentator" (Russian: Комментатор)	November 7, 2008	August 8, 2012
121 (17)	"The Good, the Bad, and the Girls" (Russian: Добро, зло и девочки)	November 6, 2008	unknown
122 (18)	"The End of Days" "The End of the World (Studio 100)" (Russian: Конец света)	March 31, 2009	unknown
123 (19)	"The Cherry Orchard" "The Savage Planet (4Kids)" (Russian: Вишнёвый сад)	November 5, 2008	August 8, 2012
124 (20)	"Fear Room" "The House of Horrors (Studio 100)" (Russian: Комната страха)	October 13, 2008	unknown
125 (21)	"Theater" (Russian: Театр)	March 24, 2009	unknown
126 (22)	"Elixir of Youth" (Russian: Эликсир молодости)	June 2009	unknown
127 (23)	"The Grandmother Effect, Part 1" (Russian: Эффект бабушки)	December 2008	unknown
128 (24)	"The Grandmother Effect, Part 2" (Russian: Эффект Бабушки. Часть 2)	December 2008	unknown
129 (25)	"The Grandmother Effect, Part 3" (Russian: Эффект Бабушки. Часть 3)	December 2008	unknown
130 (26)	"The Red Data Book" "The Red List (Studio 100)" (Russian: Красная книга)	March 27, 2009	unknown
131 (27)	"Only Mountains" "They're Just Mountains (Studio 100)" (Russian: Только горы)	March 30, 2009	unknown
132 (28)	"The Vacuum Cleaner" (Russian: Пылесос)	March 25, 2009	unknown
133 (29)	"The Nightwalker" (Russian: Сомнамбула)	March 23, 2009	unknown
134 (30)	"Forbidden Fruit" (Russian: Запретный плод)	August 20, 2009	unknown
135 (31)	"Day of Quarrels" "Go and Tell (Studio 100)" (Russian: Иди и скажи)	March 26, 2009	unknown
136 (32)	"Indian Tea" (Russian: Индийский чай)	2009	unknown
137 (33)	"Game Till the End" "The Game Must Go On (Studio 100)" (Russian: Партия будет доиграна)	2009	unknown
138 (34)	"Rosa Goes on a Diet" "I'd Rather Diet (Studio 100)" (Russian: Диета для Нюши)	August 20, 2009	unknown
139 (35)	"Ode to a Dresser" (Russian: Ода для комода)	2009	unknown
140 (36)	"The Suitcase" (Russian: Чемодан)	2009	unknown
141 (37)	"Two Magicians" (Russian: Два волшебника)	2009	unknown
142 (38)	"The Sandwich" (Russian: Бутерброд)	2009	unknown
143 (39)	"Runaway Rocket, Part 1" (Russian: Спасение улетающих, часть 1)	August 20, 2009	unknown
144 (40)	"Runaway Rocket, Part 2" (Russian: Спасение улетающих, часть 2)	August 20, 2009	unknown
145 (41)	"Extreme Trust" "Trust Me, Chiko! (Studio 100)" (Russian: Верь в меня, Ёжик!)	2009	unknown
146 (42)	"The Art of Mapping" "Mapmarker (Studio 100)" (Russian: Картография)	2009	unknown
147 (43)	"Dolce Vita" (Russian: Сладкая жизнь)	2009	unknown
148 (44)	"The Creator" (Russian: Создатель)	2009	unknown
149 (45)	"Mystery of Ancient Treasures" (Russian: Тайна древних сокровищ)	October 2009	unknown
150 (46)	"Mystery of Ancient Treasures 2" (Russian: Тайна древних сокровищ)	October 2009	unknown
151 (47)	"Artistic Expression, Part 1" "Less Figures, More Feeling 1 (Studio 100)" (Russian: Слишком фигурное катание)	December 2009	unknown
152 (48)	"Artistic Expression, Part 2" "Less Figures, More Feeling 2 (Studio 100)" (Russian: Слишком фигурное катание 2)	December 2009	unknown
153 (49)	"Hands" (Russian: Руки)	September 16, 2009	unknown
154 (50)	"Order" (Russian: Распорядок)	November 2, 2009	unknown
155 (51)	"New Year Fairytale, Part 1" (Russian: Новогодняя сказка. Серия 1)	November 14, 2009	unknown
156 (52)	"New Year Fairytale, Part 2" (Russian: Новогодняя сказка. Серия 2)	November 14, 2009	unknown
157 (53)	"Constitutional Crisis" (Russian: Неравные условия)	November 30, 2009	unknown
158 (54)	"Ice" (Russian: Лёд)	December 2009	unknown
159 (55)	"Time for Everything" (Russian: Всё успеть)	December 11, 2009	unknown
160 (56)	"Unhealthy Record" (Russian: Нездоровый рекорд)	December 11, 2009	unknown
161 (57)	"Air for Inspiration" (Russian: Воздух для вдохновения)	December 17, 2009	unknown
162 (58)	"Saving Time" (Russian: Экономия времени)	December 17, 2009	unknown
163 (59)	"The Big Push" "Bobsledding - a Matter of Principle (Studio 100)" (Russian: Бобслей - дело принципа)	2009	unknown
164 (60)	"Hockey, Part 1" (Russian: Хоккей. Часть 1)	February 18, 2010	unknown
165 (61)	"Hockey, Part 2" (Russian: Хоккей. Часть 2)	February 18, 2010	unknown
166 (62)	"Coach" (Russian: Тренер)	February 18, 2010	unknown
167 (63)	"Music Therapy" (Russian: Музотерапия)	April 15, 2010	unknown
168 (64)	"Mr. Window Dresser" "Mr. Renovator (Studio 100)" (Russian: Господин оформитель)	April 15, 2010	unknown
169 (65)	"Oh Ye Grateful" "Ever So Grateful (Studio 100)" (Russian: О, благодарная!)	April 15, 2010	unknown
170 (66)	"Drips and Drabs Amid Nature" "When Dealing with Nature (Studio 100)" (Russian: Несколько мелочей на фоне природы)	April 15, 2010	unknown
171 (67)	"The Erudite" "Word Nerd (Studio 100)" (Russian: Эрудит)	September 11, 2010	unknown
172 (68)	"Black and White Movie" (Russian: Чёрно-белое кино)	September 12, 2010	unknown
173 (69)	"Generous Sky" (Russian: Щедрое небо)	September 13, 2010	unknown
174 (70)	"Doctrine of Relativity" "Theory of Relativity (Studio 100)" (Russian: Теория относительности)	September 14, 2010	unknown
175 (71)	"Tourism" (Russian: Туризм)	September 21, 2010	unknown
176 (72)	"Who's Pulling the Strings?" (Russian: Кто дёргает за ниточки?)	September 22, 2010	unknown
177 (73)	"Sun Bunny" "Sunny Bunny (Studio 100)" (Russian: Солнечный зайчик)	September 23, 2010	unknown
178 (74)	"You Exist" "To Be You (Studio 100)" (Russian: Ты - есть)	September 24, 2010	unknown
179 (75)	"Willpower" (Russian: Сила воли)	September 25, 2010	unknown
180 (76)	"The Fatalists" (Russian: Фаталисты)	September 26, 2010	unknown
181 (77)	"Monologues" (Russian: Монологи)	September 27, 2010	unknown
182 (78)	"Medium" (Russian: Мeдиум)	December 20, 2010	unknown
183 (79)	"Shrink" (Russian: Психолог)	December 20, 2010	unknown
184 (80)	"Library" (Russian: Библиотека)	December 20, 2010	unknown
185 (81)	"Paired Macrame" "Macrame for Two (Studio 100)" (Russian: Парное макраме)	December 20, 2010	unknown
186 (82)	"Moon Bunny, Pаrt 1" (Russian: Лунный заяц. Часть 1)	December 9, 2010	unknown
187 (83)	"Moon Bunny, Pаrt 2" (Russian: Лунный заяц. Часть 2)	December 9, 2010	unknown
188 (84)	"The Nannies" (Russian: Няньки)	August 25, 2011	unknown
189 (85)	"What the Wind Will Bring" (Russian: Что принесёт ветер)	December 20, 2010	unknown
190 (86)	"Incognito" (Russian: Инкогнито)	August 25, 2011	unknown
191 (87)	"If You're Going to Cry" (Russian: Реветь так реветь)	August 25, 2011	unknown
192 (88)	"The Test, Part 1" (Russian: Проверка, часть 1)	August 25, 2011	unknown
193 (89)	"The Test, Part 2" (Russian: Проверка, часть 2)	August 25, 2011	unknown
194 (90)	"A Place in History" (Russian: Место в истории)	August 25, 2011	unknown
195 (91)	"Guardian Angels" (Russian: Жмурки и ангелы)	August 25, 2011	unknown
196 (92)	"Foreign Voices" (Russian: Чужие голоса)	August 25, 2011	unknown
197 (93)	"Preventive Measures" (Russian: Профилактика)	December 1, 2011	unknown
198 (94)	"Crunch" (Russian: Хрум)	December 22, 2011	unknown
199 (95)	"The Memento" (Russian: На память)	December 1, 2011	unknown
200 (96)	"Too Close to Heart" (Russian: Близко к сердцу)	December 1, 2011	unknown
201 (97)	"The Longest Night" (Russian: Самая длинная ночь)	December 1, 2011	unknown
202 (98)	"Invisible Me" (Russian: Невидимка)	December 1, 2011	unknown
203 (99)	"Project Africa" (Russian: Проект Африка)	December 1, 2011	unknown
204 (100)	"Australia" (Russian: Австралия)	December 1, 2011	unknown
205 (101)	"The Cold War" (Russian: Холодная война)	December 1, 2011	unknown
206 (102)	"Happy New Crunch, Part 1" (Russian: С Новым Хрумом, часть 1)	December 22, 2011	unknown
207 (103)	"Happy New Crunch, Part 2" (Russian: С Новым Хрумом, часть 2)	December 22, 2011	unknown
208 (104)	"Clean Sport" (Russian: Чистый спорт)	August 23, 2012	unknown
209 (105)	"Six Letter Breakfast" (Russian: Завтрак из 6 букв)	September 3, 2012	unknown
210 (106)	"A Milky Bet" (Russian: Молочное пари)	September 3, 2012	unknown
211 (107)	"The Happiness Recipe" (Russian: Рецепт счастья)	September 3, 2012	unknown
212 (108)	"The Parachute" (Russian: Парашют)	August 23, 2012	unknown
213 (109)	"The Souvenir" (Russian: Сувенир)	September 3, 2012	unknown
214 (110)	"Chess" (Russian: Шахматы)	August 23, 2012	unknown
215 (111)	"The Way It Was" (Russian: Как это было)	September 3, 2012	unknown
216 (112)	"New Year's Mess" (Russian: Сыр-бор Новый-год)	December 31, 2015	unknown

=== Season 3 (2011–13; 2016–18) ===
This season is sub-titled New Adventures, and later Sports. This is the only season to be animated in CGI. "Adulthood Elixir (ru: Эликсир взрослости)" was given a credit to a friend of Smesharikis called "Alexey Bubnov (ru: Бубнов Алексей)"

No.	English dub title (top) Russian title (bottom)	Russian air date	English air date
216 (1)	"No Mercy!" (Russian: Пощады не будет)	October 27, 2012	November 3, 2021
217 (2)	"Punishment" (Russian: Наказуха)	October 27, 2012	November 3, 2021
218 (3)	"Statistics" (Russian: Статистика)	November 5, 2012	November 11, 2021
219 (4)	"The Unforgiven" (Russian: Непрощённый)	December 22, 2011	November 6, 2021
220 (5)	"The Power of Fashion" (Russian: Власть моды)	December 22, 2011	November 9, 2021
221 (6)	"The Art of Sewing" (Russian: Искусство кройки и житья)	November 5, 2012	November 11, 2021
222 (7)	"No One's Jackpot" (Russian: Ничейный выигрыш)	November 17, 2012	November 6, 2021
223 (8)	"Today and Tomorrow" (Russian: Я завтрашний, я вчерашний)	November 24, 2012	November 9, 2021
224 (9)	"Perfect Ear" (Russian: Абсолютный слух)	May 18, 2013	November 13, 2021
225 (10)	"Who Framed Krash the Rabbit" (Russian: Кто подставил кролика Кроша)	December 15, 2012	March 25, 2020
226 (11)	"The Illusionist" (Russian: Иллюзионист)	November 3, 2012	March 25, 2020
227 (12)	"Don't Tell Anyone" (Russian: Только никому не говори)	November 10, 2012	March 25, 2020
228 (13)	"Time Robbers" (Russian: Похитители времени)	December 1, 2012	March 25, 2020
229 (14)	"Pin's Last Mistake" (Russian: Последняя ошибка Пина)	December 8, 2012	March 25, 2020
230 (15)	"Shusha" (Russian: Шуша)	December 17, 2012	March 25, 2020
231 (16)	"The Packers" (Russian: Упаковщики)	January 12, 2013	March 25, 2020
232 (17)	"The Games" (Russian: Спартакиада)	January 5, 2013	March 25, 2020
233 (18)	"The Border" (Russian: Шлагбаум)	January 19, 2013	March 25, 2020
234 (19)	"Mass and Distance" (Russian: Массы и расстояния)	January 26, 2013	March 25, 2020
235 (20)	"Who Laughs the Last" (Russian: Кто смеётся последним)	February 2, 2013	March 25, 2020
236 (21)	"Instead of Me" (Russian: Вместо меня)	February 9, 2013	March 25, 2020
237 (22)	"The Savage" (Russian: Дикарь)	February 16, 2013	March 25, 2020
238 (23)	"Stepanida" (Russian: Степанида)	March 2, 2013	March 25, 2020
239 (24)	"Сyber Rosa" (Russian: Кибернюша)	March 9, 2013	March 25, 2020
240 (25)	"Can't Have It Both Ways" (Russian: Одно из двух)	March 23, 2013	March 25, 2020
241 (26)	"Rosa and the Bear" (Russian: Нюша и медведь)	March 30, 2013	March 25, 2020
242 (27)	"Weird Sense of Humor" (Russian: Мой странный юмор)	April 6, 2013	March 25, 2020
243 (28)	"Rise of the Machine" (Russian: Восстание машин)	April 27, 2013	March 25, 2020
244 (29)	"Complicated Postal Routine" (Russian: Сложные механизмы почты)	April 13, 2013	March 25, 2020
245 (30)	"Pandyosis" (Russian: Пандянка)	April 20, 2013	March 25, 2020
246 (31)	"Time Machine" (Russian: Машина времени)	March 16, 2013	March 25, 2020
247 (32)	"The BibiBest Toys" (Russian: ЛюБибимые игрушки)	May 4, 2013	March 25, 2020
248 (33)	"The Fortune Cookies" (Russian: Печенье судьбы)	June 1, 2013	March 25, 2020
249 (34)	"The Reconstruction" (Russian: Перестройка)	May 25, 2013	March 25, 2020
250 (35)	"The Big Takeover" (Russian: Большой переворот)	May 11, 2013	March 25, 2020
251 (36)	"The Big Trouble" (Russian: Очень большие неприятности)	June 22, 2013	March 25, 2020
252 (37)	"The List" (Russian: Список)	May 18, 2013	November 13, 2021
253 (38)	"Kindergarten" (Russian: Детский сад)	June 29, 2013	September 28, 2021
254 (39)	"The Inheritance" (Russian: Наследство)	July 20, 2013	September 25, 2021
255 (40)	"No Questions Asked" (Russian: Без вопросов)	July 27, 2013	October 6, 2021
256 (41)	"The Adulthood Elixir" (Russian: Эликсир взрослости)	July 27, 2013	October 6, 2021
257 (42)	"Marmaduk" (Russian: Мармадюк)	August 24, 2013	September 23, 2021
258 (43)	"One Way Ticket" (Russian: Билет в один конец)	September 7, 2013	September 30, 2021
259 (44)	"The Tin Cup" (Russian: Жестяной кубок)	September 21, 2013	October 11, 2021
260 (45)	"A Glass of Water" (Russian: Стакан воды)	September 14, 2013	October 10, 2021
261 (46)	"The Duel" (Russian: Дуэль)	October 5, 2013	October 14, 2021
262 (47)	"The New Life" (Russian: Новая жизнь)	October 19, 2013	October 12, 2021
263 (48)	"New Year Broadcast" (Russian: Новогодний эфир)	November 18, 2013	November 5, 2021
264 (49)	"The Caring" (Russian: Заботливые)	October 12, 2013	October 4, 2021
265 (50)	"Smart House" (Russian: Умный дом)	October 26, 2013	October 19, 2021
266 (51)	"The Good Fairy" (Russian: Добрая фея)	November 2, 2013	October 21, 2021
267 (52)	"The Simulators" (Russian: Симулянты)	November 23, 2013	October 15, 2021
268 (53)	"An Unexpected Reaction" (Russian: Нездоровая реакция)	November 16, 2013	October 26, 2021
269 (54)	"The Real Bear" (Russian: Настоящий медведь)	November 9, 2013	March 25, 2020
270 (55)	"The Master of Mess" (Russian: Мастер беспорядка)	December 14, 2013	October 7, 2021
271 (56)	"The Big Plans" (Russian: Большие планы)	December 7, 2013	October 28, 2021
272 (57)	"A Hedgehog in Bear's Skin" (Russian: Ёжик в медвежьей шкуре)	December 21, 2013	November 1, 2021
273 (58)	"Too Fast" (Russian: Слишком быстрый)	January 21, 2016	TBA
274 (59)	"The Tricks" (Russian: Приёмчики)	January 21, 2016	TBA
275 (60)	"What You Do" (Russian: Так и делай)	January 28, 2016	TBA
276 (61)	"For the Sake of Health" (Russian: Ради здоровья)	January 28, 2016	TBA
277 (62)	"The Earth's Gravity" (Russian: Притяжение земли)	February 4, 2016	TBA
278 (63)	"Only the Web that Separates Us" (Russian: Только сеть разделяет нас)	February 4, 2016	TBA
279 (64)	"Badminton" (Russian: Бадминтон)	February 11, 2016	TBA
280 (65)	"SuperMegaExtraProfessional" (Russian: СуперМегаЭкстраПрофи)	February 11, 2016	TBA
281 (66)	"A Lifelong Dream" (Russian: Мечта всей жизни)	March 18, 2017	TBA
282 (67)	"Explain Yourself with Skis!" (Russian: Объясняйтесь лыжами!)	March 18, 2017	TBA
283 (68)	"The Curling Queen" (Russian: Королева кёрлинга)	October 21, 2017	TBA
284 (69)	"Skis, Bullets and Nerves" (Russian: Лыжи, пули, нервы)	October 21, 2017	TBA
285 (70)	"An Exclusive Interview" (Russian: Эксклюзивное интервью)	November 8, 2018	TBA
286 (71)	"Talents and the Fan" (Russian: Таланты и поклонница)	November 8, 2018	TBA

=== Season 4 (2020–23) ===
This season is sub-titled New Season. It consists, to about half, of the old scripts, written for Seasons 1-2, and some for Season 3.

No.	English dub title (top) Russian title (bottom)	Russian air date	English air date
287 (1)	"Natural Property" (Russian: Природное свойство)	May 18, 2020	TBA
288 (2)	"Good Night" (Russian: Спокойной ночи)	May 18, 2020	TBA
289 (3)	"The Master and the Strawberries" (Russian: Мастер и земляника)	May 18, 2020	TBA
290 (4)	"Tattlers" (Russian: Сплетники)	May 18, 2020	TBA
291 (5)	"A Rock Opera and Something Else" (Russian: Рок-опера и что-то ещё)	May 25, 2020	TBA
292 (6)	"Pinland" (Russian: Пинляндия)	May 25, 2020	TBA
293 (7)	"The Great Mimicry" (Russian: Великий мимикрятор)	May 25, 2020	TBA
294 (8)	"Valhalla" (Russian: Вальхалла)	May 25, 2020	TBA
295 (9)	"Favorite Grandson" (Russian: Любимый внук)	June 1, 2020	TBA
296 (10)	"Domestic Pet" (Russian: Домашнее животное)	June 1, 2020	TBA
297 (11)	"Capriette Fan Club" (Russian: Фан-клуб Козетты)	June 1, 2020	TBA
298 (12)	"The Fountain" (Russian: Фонтан)	June 1, 2020	TBA
299 (13)	"The Ash-Foot" (Russian: Ясень-пень)	September 10, 2020	TBA
300 (14)	"The Photo" (Russian: Фотография)	September 10, 2020	TBA
301 (15)	"Taboo" (Russian: Табу)	September 10, 2020	TBA
302 (16)	"You Don't Have Enough Memory" (Russian: У вас недостаточно памяти)	September 10, 2020	TBA
303 (17)	"The Magic Jug" (Russian: Волшебный кувшинчик)	September 10, 2020	TBA
304 (18)	"Imposter Tablecloth" (Russian: Скатерть-самозванка)	September 17, 2020	TBA
305 (19)	"The Lawyers" (Russian: Юристы)	September 17, 2020	TBA
306 (20)	"The Storm Petrel" (Russian: Буревестник)	September 17, 2020	TBA
307 (21)	"1001 Nails" (Russian: 1001 гвоздь)	September 17, 2020	TBA
308 (22)	"The Heart of Steel" (Russian: Стальное сердце)	September 17, 2020	TBA
309 (23)	"Guilty" (Russian: Виноватый)	October 15, 2020	TBA
310 (24)	"The Telepathist" (Russian: Телепат)	October 15, 2020	TBA
311 (25)	"Life on the Cloud" (Russian: Жизнь на облаке)	October 15, 2020	TBA
312 (26)	"The Power of Inaction" (Russian: Сила бездействия)	October 15, 2020	TBA
313 (27)	"The Screws" (Russian: Винтики)	November 19, 2020	TBA
314 (28)	"Repairmen" (Russian: Починили)	November 19, 2020	TBA
315 (29)	"The Heartbreak Club" (Russian: Клуб разбитых сердец)	November 19, 2020	TBA
316 (30)	"The Golden Age" (Russian: Золотой век)	November 19, 2020	TBA
317 (31)	"The Emigrant, Part 1" (Russian: Эмигрант. Часть 1)	December 17, 2020	TBA
318 (32)	"Zag" (Russian: Заг)	December 17, 2020	TBA
319 (33)	"Hitch" (Russian: Загвоздка)	December 24, 2020	TBA
320 (34)	"New Year Custom" (Russian: Старинный новогодний обычай)	December 24, 2020	TBA
321 (35)	"Turkeys" (Russian: Бирюльки)	January 21, 2021	TBA
322 (36)	"The Flight Attendant" (Russian: Стюардесса)	January 28, 2021	TBA
323 (37)	"The Emigrant, Part 2" (Russian: Эмигрант. Часть 2)	February 4, 2021	TBA
324 (38)	"A Woman's Secrets" (Russian: Женские секреты)	February 14, 2021	TBA
325 (39)	"Quarantine" (Russian: Карантин)	February 25, 2021	TBA
326 (40)	"The Reeds" (Russian: Камыши)	March 4, 2021	TBA
327 (41)	"Nervous and Contagious" (Russian: Нервный и заразный)	March 11, 2021	TBA
328 (42)	"Fairytales" (Russian: Сказки)	March 18, 2021	TBA
329 (43)	"A Cure for Everything" (Russian: Лекарство от всего)	March 25, 2021	TBA
330 (44)	"Hello, My Diary!" (Russian: Здравствуй, мой дневничок!)	April 1, 2021	TBA
331 (45)	"The Right Moment" (Russian: Подходящий момент)	April 15, 2021	TBA
332 (46)	"Accurate Arrow" (Russian: Меткая стрела)	April 22, 2021	TBA
333 (47)	"The Oracle" (Russian: Оракул)	April 29, 2021	TBA
334 (48)	"The Information Desk" (Russian: Справочное бюро)	May 6, 2021	TBA
335 (49)	"The Scarlet Flower" (Russian: Аленький цветочек)	May 20, 2021	TBA
336 (50)	"Tradition" (Russian: Традиция)	May 27, 2021	TBA
337 (51)	"A Paranormal Adventure" (Russian: Паранормальное приключение)	June 1, 2021	TBA
338 (52)	"The Best Rest" (Russian: Лучший отдых)	June 10, 2021	TBA
339 (53)	"Honey - to Me, Adventures - to You" (Russian: Мне - мёд, тебе - приключения)	June 17, 2021	TBA
340 (54)	"Simply and Contrary" (Russian: Просто так и вопреки)	September 2, 2021	TBA
341 (55)	"Thirst" (Russian: Жажда)	September 2, 2021	TBA
342 (56)	"Goosenius" (Russian: Гусений)	September 2, 2021	TBA
343 (57)	"The Translator" (Russian: Переводчик)	September 2, 2021	TBA
344 (58)	"The Master of Ceremonies" (Russian: Церемониймейстер)	September 23, 2021	TBA
345 (59)	"The Great Book of Dreams" (Russian: Большая книга снов)	September 30, 2021	TBA
346 (60)	"Teacher's Day" (Russian: День учителя)	October 5, 2021	TBA
347 (61)	"Glasses" (Russian: Очки)	October 14, 2021	TBA
348 (62)	"The Funny Hamster Suit" (Russian: Хомяк - весельчак)	October 21, 2021	TBA
349 (63)	"The Seaweed" (Russian: Морская капуста)	October 28, 2021	TBA
350 (63)	"Involvement" (Russian: Причастность)	November 18, 2021	TBA
351 (64)	"A Winter Tale" (Russian: Зимняя сказка)	December 9, 2021	TBA
352 (65)	"Safety Cushions" (Russian: Подушки безопасности)	December 16, 2021	TBA
353 (66)	"A Hunt for the Tiger" (Russian: Охота на тигра)	December 25, 2021	TBA
354 (67)	"Ping-Pong Rules" (Russian: Правила тенниса)	January 13, 2022	TBA
355 (68)	"The Hot Show" (Russian: Зажигательное шоу)	January 20, 2022	TBA
356 (69)	"The Bird Adaptation" (Russian: Адаптиция)	January 27, 2022	TBA
357 (70)	"Krashoriki" (Russian: Окрошка)	February 10, 2022	TBA
358 (71)	"Rabbit's Palm" (Russian: Кроличья лапка)	February 17, 2022	TBA
359 (72)	"Menagerie" (Russian: Зверинец)	February 24, 2022	TBA
360 (73)	"The Blue Bird" (Russian: Синяя птица)	March 3, 2022	TBA
361 (74)	"Shining of Marzipan" (Russian: Сияние марципанов)	March 10, 2022	TBA
362 (75)	"How Adults Play" (Russian: Игра по-взрослому)	March 24, 2022	TBA
363 (76)	"The Watchman" (Russian: Сторож)	April 7, 2022	TBA
364 (77)	"Super-Con Artist" (Russian: Супержульбист)	April 14, 2022	TBA
365 (78)	"Feedback" (Russian: Обратная связь)	April 28, 2022	TBA
366 (79)	"Of Planes & Butterflies" (Russian: Самолёт и бабочки)	May 12, 2022	TBA
367 (80)	"The Frog House" (Russian: Лягушатник)	May 19, 2022	TBA
368 (81)	"Full Cellar" (Russian: Погребок)	May 26, 2022	TBA
369 (82)	"Taper" (Russian: Тапёр)	June 2, 2022	TBA
370 (83)	"The Stick of Truth" (Russian: Ляпус фикус хряпус)	June 9, 2022	TBA
371 (84)	"Barry and the Wave" (Russian: Копатыч и волна)	June 16, 2022	TBA
372 (85)	"Waterpark" (Russian: Аквапарк)	June 23, 2022	TBA
373 (86)	"The Glorious Tale of the Radiant Knight" (Russian: Славная повесть о лучезарном рыцаре)	June 30, 2022	TBA
374 (87)	"Just in Case" (Russian: Вдруг)	July 7, 2022	TBA
375 (89)	"The Wool" (Russian: Шерсть)	July 14, 2022	TBA
376 (90)	"The Inner Space" (Russian: Внутреннее пространство)	July 28, 2022	TBA
377 (91)	"The Hat" (Russian: Шляпа)	August 4, 2022	TBA
378 (92)	"The Boat" (Russian: Кораблик)	August 18, 2022	TBA
379 (93)	"Quiet Forest Paths" (Russian: Тихие лесные тропинки)	August 25, 2022	TBA
380 (94)	"Rosa the Circus Princess" (Russian: Принцесса цирка)	September 1, 2022	TBA
381 (95)	"The Island" (Russian: Остров)	September 8, 2022	TBA
382 (96)	"Culture" (Russian: Культура)	September 15, 2022	TBA
383 (97)	"The Museum" (Russian: Музей)	September 22, 2022	TBA
384 (98)	"The Clay, Part 1" (Russian: Глина. Часть 1)	October 6, 2022	TBA
385 (99)	"The Clay, Part 2" (Russian: Глина. Часть 2)	October 13, 2022	TBA
386 (100)	"Arrival of the Train" (Russian: Прибытие поезда)	October 20, 2022	TBA
387 (101)	"The Old Men and the Sea" (Russian: Старики и море)	February 16, 2023	TBA
388 (102)	"Lunatics" (Russian: Лунатики)	February 16, 2023	TBA
389 (103)	"Ice Fishing" (Russian: Подлёдный лов)	February 16, 2023	TBA
390 (104)	"Damsel in the Sands" (Russian: Девушка в песках)	March 2, 2023	TBA
391 (105)	"Obsession" (Russian: Наваждение)	March 16, 2023	TBA
392 (106)	"Reason to Live" (Russian: Повод для жизни)	March 23, 2023	TBA
393 (107)	"Amidst the Noisy Dance" (Russian: Среди шумного бала)	April 6, 2023	TBA
394 (108)	"A Cat of Uncertainty in the Box" (Russian: Неизвестный кот в ящике)	April 13, 2023	TBA
395 (109)	"The Pipe" (Russian: Труба)	April 20, 2023	TBA
396 (110)	"The Coast Is THAT Way!" (Russian: Берег там!)	May 11, 2023	TBA
397 (111)	"The Executors" (Russian: Душеприказчики)	May 18, 2023	TBA
398 (112)	"Music" (Russian: Музыка)	May 25, 2023	TBA

=== Spin-off: Kikoriki. Cinema (2022–24) ===
This spin-off is sub-titled Cinema. The namesake pilot episode has premiered on KinoPoisk, tentatively listed in the "New Season". The following 4 episodes of this season were aired in theaters, while the rest were available online. All episodes are longer than average, and their length varies from 13 to 15 minutes, as opposed to the usual 6.5 or 11 minutes. All episodes are based on the common theme—movie parodies.

No.	English dub title (top) Russian title (bottom)	Russian air date	English air date
1	"Cinema" (Russian: Синема)	December 22, 2022	TBA
2	"Krash-Boom-Bang and Tra-la-la" (Russian: Быдыдыщ и труляля)	October 12, 2023	TBA
3	"The Heroic Hero-Chronicles of the Heroes" (Russian: Героические хроники героев)	October 12, 2023	TBA
4	"The Starring Hero" (Russian: Главный герой)	October 12, 2023	TBA
5	"The Star Princess" (Russian: Звёздная принцесса)	October 12, 2023	TBA
6	"Super Aries" (Russian: Супер Овен)	December 21, 2023	TBA
7	"The Great Adventure of Wally" (Russian: Большое приключение Бараша)	December 28, 2023 (Part 1); January 18, 2024 (Part 2)	TBA
8	"Case of the Missing Rake" (Russian: Дело о пропавших граблях)	February 15, 2024	TBA

== Films (2011–29) ==
Title	Directed by	Original release date
"KikoRiki: Team Invincible" (Russian: Смешарики. Начало)	Denis Chernov	December 22, 2011
"KikoRiki: Legend of the Golden Dragon" (Russian: Смешарики. Легенда о золотом драконе)	Denis Chernov	March 17, 2016
"KikoRiki: Déjà Vu" (Russian: Смешарики. Дежавю)	Denis Chernov	April 26, 2018
"KikoRiki through the Universes" (Russian: Смешарики сквозь вселенные)	Denis Chernov	August 6, 2026
"KikoRiki. New Year's universe" (Russian: Смешарики. Новогодняя вселенная)	Denis Chernov	December 9, 2026
"KikoRiki through the Universes 2" (Russian: Смешарики сквозь вселенные 2)	Denis Chernov	December 18, 2029
