= List of GoGoRiki episodes =

This is a list of episodes of the American children's animated television series GoGoRiki that have been broadcast in the United States and Canada. A total of 34 episodes divided into 101 6-minute segments have been broadcast in Russia.

== Series overview ==
Season	Segments	Episodes	Originally released	
Season	Segments	Episodes	First released	Last released
1	54	18	September 27, 2008	March 28, 2009
2	47	16	August 22, 2009	August 8, 2012

== Episodes ==
=== Season 1 (2008–09) ===
No. overall	No. in season	English dub title (top) Russian title (bottom)	English airdate
1a	1a	"The Big Race" (Russian: "Большие гонки")	September 27, 2008
It's the Double Desert Dash, and Pogoriki and Chikoriki run into trouble early when they crash their vehicle into a cactus.
1b	1b	"A Gift for Rosariki" (Russian: "День Рождения Нюши")	September 27, 2008
After Chikoriki looks for a gift for Rosariki's party, he and Pogoriki wind up lost in the desert.
1c	1c	"The Telegraph" (Russian: "Телеграф")	September 27, 2008
Ottoriki's new invention, the telegraph, allows everyone to communicate through instant messaging. However, Pogoriki's telegraph breaks, making him a social outcast.
2a	2a	"Extra! Extra!" (Russian: "Последняя радуга")	October 4, 2008
Pogoriki makes up sensational headlines to generate interest for his new newspaper.
2b	2b	"Magnetism" (Russian: "Магнетизм")	October 4, 2008
The discovery of a magnet turns Rosariki, Wolliriki, Pogoriki, and Chikoriki against each other and Doco must work to bring them back together.
2c	2c	"Treasure Hunt" (Russian: "Балласт")	October 4, 2008
Pogoriki, Chikoriki, Ottoriki and Rosariki go on a top secret submarine mission.
3a	3a	"The Sweetness of Honey" (Russian: "Это сладкое слово «Мёд»")	October 11, 2008
Despite being honey-intolerant, Boboriki can't stop himself from eating the delectable nectar and when his friends force him into quarantine, Bobo decides to break out with the help of Wolliriki.
3b	3b	"The Lucky One" (Russian: "Талисман")	October 11, 2008
Wolliriki is excited about going on a hot air balloon ride with Pogoriki and Chikoriki, until he learns he is afraid of heights. Olgariki gives him a lucky charm, but Wolli must learn to overcome his fears when the ride gets dangerous and he learns Olga gave him the wrong charm.
3c	3c	"Pollution Solution" (Russian: "Большое маленькое море")	October 11, 2008
Ottoriki, Chikoriki, and Pogoriki work to find the source of sewage that is polluting the ocean.
4a	4a	"Pyramid Scheme" (Russian: "Что нужно всем (Пирамидка)")	October 18, 2008
Pogoriki abandons his hardware marketing campaign to join Chikoriki with a potential product of the year, a happiness-including pyramid called the 'Cheeramid'.
4b	4b	"It's About Time" (Russian: "Как собрать друзей по-быстрому")	October 18, 2008
Rosariki pretends to have an injury to alleviate her boredom.
4c	4c	"Dreams in the Sky" (Russian: "Полёты во сне и наяву")	October 18, 2008
Ottoriki promises to fly his plane to help protect Boboriki's harvest, but lands in trouble when he stays up all night reading a comic book and falls asleep while up in the air.
5a	5a	"The Beauty Within" (Russian: "Мисс Вселенная")	October 25, 2008
Rosariki is convinced that her friends are lying to her when she is rejected by an international beauty pageant.
5b	5b	"The Magic Trick" (Russian: "Секрет Гудини")	October 25, 2008
Bigoriki isn't satisfied with his magic act, despite the entire audience loving his tricks, and with the aid of Wolliriki, he attempts to do the greatest trick of all by replicating a dangerous stunt done by Merlioriki the Magnificent.
5c	5c	"Bad Manners" (Russian: "Путь в приличное общество")	October 25, 2008
Olgariki attempts to help Rosa break a bad habit of whistling.
6a	6a	"Woe is Wolli" (Russian: "Играй, гармония")	November 1, 2008
Wolliriki's perfectly poetic state of mind is interrupted by Pogoriki and Chikoriki, who work to help bring back his "creative plizzang".
6b	6b	"Scary Stories" (Russian: "Страшилка для Нюши")	November 1, 2008
Rosariki is frightened by a campfire story told by Pogo and Chiko about the Shadow Prince Lovermore.
6c	6c	"A Hair Scare" (Russian: "Зачем нужны друзья")	November 1, 2008
Chikoriki tells Pogoriki his biggest secret, that he believes he is going bald.
7a	7a	"Double Doco" (Russian: "Невоспитанный клон")	November 8, 2008
Docoriki has found out that his evil clone came back, so Ottoriki and Docoriki have to stop him from making pranks and breaking houses.
7b	7b	"The Piano" (Russian: "Рояль")	November 8, 2008
Rosariki gets herself a piano, but she struggles to find the best spot to put it, much to the annoyance of Pogoriki, Chikoriki, and Wolliriki, who have to do the hard work by carrying it.
7c	7c	"Sweet Lily" (Russian: "Лили")	November 8, 2008
After finding a picture of a pretty female hedgehog floating in the sea, Chikoriki becomes obsessed with finding her and sets off to sea, against the wishes of his friend, Pogoriki.
8a	8a	"Star Gazing" (Russian: "Думают ли о Вас На звёздах?)	November 15, 2008
Boboriki discovers crop circles in his wheat fields and Pogoriki and Ottoriki attempt to solve the mystery, which gets weirder once they realize the circles form an enormous portrait of Chikoriki.
8b	8b	"Me, Myself, and Island" (Russian: "Право на одиночество")	November 15, 2008
Wolliriki's wish for solitude is granted when a storm blows him onto a deserted island; at first he's ecstatic, but after several days of loneliness, he starts to lose his mind.
8c	8c	"Bad Hair Day" (Russian: "Куда приводят желания")	November 15, 2008
After a strong wind ruins her new hairdo, Rosariki creates a magic wand and tries to make everything just right for herself.
9a	9a	"Movie Madness" (Russian: "Ёжик в туманности")	November 22, 2008
Pogoriki and his friends try to make a science fiction movie, but everything goes wrong and Chikoriki ends up all alone in the foggy mist.
9b	9b	"What a Chore" (Russian: "Железная няня")	November 22, 2008
Ottoriki builds a robot maid to do Pogoriki and Chikoriki's chores for them, but the robot starts treating everyone like babies.
9c	9c	"Promises" (Russian: "Обещание")	November 22, 2008
Pogoriki wants Chikoriki to join him in trying a special intelligence increasing plant that only blooms once a year, but Chiko is more focused on committing to his promise to help Rosariki find her missing stuffed toy.
10a	10a	"Potential Disaster" (Russian: "Приятные новости")	November 29, 2008
Pogoriki takes Wolliriki and Chikoriki on a hike in the mountains, where they encounter an avalanche, an earthquake, and an erupting volcano; Pogoriki welcomes the character-building challenges, but the others hate them.
10b	10b	"Scent of a Wolli" (Russian: "Моя прелесть")	November 29, 2008
Hoping to attract Rosariki, Wolliriki puts on a large amount of perfume; the result isn't what he'd expected.
10c	10c	"Weather or Not" (Russian: "Метеорология")	November 29, 2008
Bigoriki apparently ends a rainstorm with a rain dance; Docoriki, who believes in science rather than folklore, is astounded.
11a	11a	"Big Trouble" (Russian: "Торжество разума")	December 6, 2008
Docoriki is self-conscious about the size of his antlers, especially after being invited to a scientific awards ceremony.
11b	11b	"The Forgotten Memory" (Russian: "Забытая история")	December 6, 2008
Bigoriki's friends try to help him retrieve a forgotten memory, first by using hypnotism, then technology.
11c	11c	"Ice and Cool" (Russian: "-41с")	December 6, 2008
In the winter, Pogoriki and Chikoriki find what they believe to be a frozen Rosariki, and try to thaw her out.
12a	12a	"Snow Daze" (Russian: "Плюс снег, минус ёлка")	December 13, 2008
Pogoriki and Chikoriki are getting a tree for Christmas. While the others determine they need snow, Pogoriki and Chikoriki warn that snow is not a certainty.
12b	12b	"Operation Santa Claus" (Russian: "Операция Дед Мороз")	December 20, 2008
Bigoriki, Boboriki, Olgariki, Ottoriki, and Docoriki are on a mission to give out presents to the rest of the villagers while they're asleep, unaware that the real Santa is out and about and that Pogo is trying to catch him to prove to Chiko that he doesn't exist.
12c	12c	"Happy New Year" (Russian: "Куда уходит старый год?")	December 27, 2008
Everybody's having a special new year, but Pogoriki's concerns about getting everything done before the new year leads to his friends trying their best to stop time from passing and letting the "old year" go.
13a	13a	"Truffle Trouble" (Russian: "Трюфель")	February 21, 2009
Boboriki finds what Docoriki believes to be a truffle in his vegetable garden and everyone starts fighting over who gets it, especially Rosariki, who starts a smear campaign against Chiko to make sure she's the one that gets to eat it.
13b	13b	"Pluto's Hero" (Russian: "Герой Плутона")	February 21, 2009
Docoriki is infuriated that the scientific community no longer considers Pluto a planet, and he goes on a hunger strike until they change it back.
13c	13c	"The Funhouse" (Russian: "Комната смеха")	February 21, 2009
Wolliriki has his worst day when he looks in a funhouse mirror and wakes up the next day to find out that he's deformed and keeps changing shape.
14a	14a	"The Costume Party" (Russian: "Маскарад")	February 28, 2009
Everyone is having a costume party, so Wolliriki needs to figure out what to be, taking hints from what the others are doing as he goes on a walk.
14b	14b	"Bobo and the Bees" (Russian: "Ульи Копатыча")	February 28, 2009
While Boboriki is taking a nap, Pogoriki and Chikoriki promise to take care of his beehives for him before he wakes up. But, when the two procrastinate and the bees start coming back, the two have to race against time to make new hives while also keeping Bobo asleep.
14c	14c	"Social Butterfly" (Russian: "Бабочка")	February 28, 2009
Docoriki is convinced that he was a butterfly in a past life, to the point that he's happily jumping around with makeshift wings on his back. So, Olgariki, Wolliriki, and Boboriki try to convince him that he's not a butterfly.
15a	15a	"Recipes for Life" (Russian: "Рецепт хорошего отдыха")	March 7, 2009
Rosariki accidentally destroys a special book Olgariki made, containing cures (or recipes) to everything, leaving her in a catatonic, depressed state. Rosa, alongside Pogoriki and Chikoriki, have to bring her back to normal by using the remaining parts of it to find the cure for her sadness.
15b	15b	"Sinking Feeling" (Russian: "Прощай, Бараш")	March 7, 2009
Bigoriki recruits everyone to help Wolliriki take a sea journey that he doesn't want to take.
15c	15c	"The Collector" (Russian: "Коллекция")	March 7, 2009
Pogoriki and Chikoriki fight over Chiko's seemingly meaningless candy wrapper collection. However, when a storm blows his wrappers away and Pogo ends up missing, Chiko realizes which one of the two is more important to him.
16a	16a	"Face the Music" (Russian: "Танцор диско")	March 14, 2009
Boboriki helps Wolli learn to dance in order to impress Rosa and everyone else at the local disco contest.
16b	16b	"Girls and Boys" (Russian: "Основной инстинкт")	March 14, 2009
Rosariki is convinced by Pogo to play 'girly' games and she becomes obsessed with playing mother with Chikoriki as her 'baby', despite his pleas against it.
16c	16c	"Sleepy Time" (Russian: "Педагогическая поэма")	March 14, 2009
Bigoriki hypnotizes Pogoriki to get him to nap in the day, but his hypnotism works too well and Pogo begins falling asleep when people clap their hands.
17a	17a	"Sick and Desired" (Russian: "ОРЗ")	March 21, 2009
Wolliriki notices his friends' deep care for a sick Doco, so he decides to get sick as well to get attention.
17b	17b	"Misery Loves Company" (Russian: "Комната грусти")	March 21, 2009
Rosariki's room of gloom becomes a hot spot for people wanting to sit in sadness.
17c	17c	"Just for Kicks" (Russian: "Футбол тайм")	March 21, 2009
18a	18a	"Just for Kicks" (Russian: "Футбол тайм")	March 28, 2009
Part 1: A disagreement about how to play soccer leads to Docoriki and Boboriki starting their own teams and having it out on the field. Part 2: The game is now in the second half. Who will win in this finale: Boboriki's team or the Docoriki Destroyers?
18b	18b	"Flyin' and Lying" (Russian: "Ежидзе")	March 28, 2009
Chikoriki lies about being able to do a circus trick to Pogoriki, Rosariki and Wolliriki, and he's so ashamed that he disguises himself as a quirky British hedgehog, so that he doesn't have to leave home and so they won't know it's him.
18c	18c	"Friend or Foe" (Russian: "Биби и его папа")	March 28, 2009
When Ottoriki makes a new friend named Roboriki, Pogoriki thinks Roboriki is a fake.

=== Season 2 (2009–11) ===
No. overall	No. in season	English dub title (top) Russian title (bottom)	English airdate
19a	1a	"Picture Perfect" (Russian: "Реалист")	August 22, 2009
Docoriki is annoyed by Bigoriki's interpretive approach to painting and tries to convince him that art needs to be completely realistic.
19b	1b	"Tae Kwon Pogo" (Russian: "Самооборона без противника")	August 22, 2009
Pogoriki claims that an enemy attack is imminent and tries to show Chikoriki how to defend himself.
19c	1c	"Gone Fishing" (Russian: "Долгая рыбалка")	August 22, 2009
Boboriki gets upset when Docoriki reads his way through a fishing trip and a tussle over their differing beliefs causes the two to be stranded in a tree.
20a	2a	"Fireworks" (Russian: "День справедливости")	August 29, 2009
Ottoriki tries to make a fireworks machine for Rosariki's birthday, but when it's destroyed by a meteor, he's convinced that inventing isn't worth it if the world can simply throw away his hard work at a moment's notice.
20b	2b	"Security Umbrella" (Russian: "Биография зонтика")	August 29, 2009
Pogoriki and Chikoriki give Wolliriki a new umbrella because his umbrella is very old and torn, but the two don't know the original is his 'security umbrella' that he believes keeps him safe from danger.
20c	2c	"Flat Chance" (Russian: "Край земли")	August 29, 2009
Docoriki tries to prove to Pogoriki that the Earth is round and, along with Chikoriki, Pogoriki tries to prove otherwise by rowing to the ends of the Earth.
21a	3a	"Bubble or Nothing" (Russian: "Мыльная опера")	September 5, 2009
Docoriki wins a bet with Bigoriki by eating a bar of soap, gaining his precious piano in the process. But, what happens when Bigoriki wants it back?
21b	3b	"Germs of Endearment" (Russian: "Ёжик и здоровье")	September 5, 2009
After worrying about his health, Chikoriki has a checkup with Olgariki, who convinces him to keep clean if he wants a healthy life. But, what happens when Chikoriki takes this to the extreme and becomes completely obsessed with staying away from germs?
21c	3c	"A Rosariki by Any Other Name" (Russian: "Её звали Нюша")	September 5, 2009
Rosariki decides she wants to be named something else, but can't figure out what her new name should be.
22a	4a	"Fate Expectations" (Russian: "Линии судьбы")	September 12, 2009
Docoriki tries to prove to Olgariki that one event can alter someone's fate, almost ruining Wolliriki and Rosariki's friendship in the process.
22b	4b	"Showtime Showdown" (Russian: "Кордебалет")	September 12, 2009
After being appointed leader of the village's annual shindig, Chikoriki notices that no one is able to make it to the dance rehearsal, causing Pogoriki to begin threatening the others to show up and dance, or else Chiko would write their names on a non-existent list of his. However, Pogo's actions end up ostracizing Chiko, who the others now see as scary.
23a	5a	"Pretty as a Picture" (Russian: "Красота")	September 19, 2009
Docoriki tries to hang up a picture in his house, and Pogoriki and Chikoriki decide that while they're hiding from Rosariki in a game of Hide and Seek, they can assist him with the location of the picture.
23b	5b	"The Dream Team" (Russian: "Живые часы")	September 19, 2009
After Wolliriki sleeps in and doesn't have the energy to join Pogoriki, Rosariki and Chikoriki's trip to the beach, Pogo consults Bigoriki about the difference in their sleep schedules.
23c	5c	"Treasure Stunt" (Russian: "Археология")	September 19, 2009
While Boboriki is gardening, Bigoriki convinces him to trick Pogoriki and Chikoriki into helping him dig by telling them there's buried treasure in the ground. Little do they know that there really is...
24a	6a	"Wolli's Singing Well" (Russian: "Ля")	September 26, 2009
Wolliriki begins practicing his singing voice after a failed lesson with Bigoriki, but after an especially high note causes him to lose his voice and he later falls into a well, how will he get out?
24b	6b	"On a Roll" (Russian: "Взаперти")	September 26, 2009
Boboriki's water tank ends up rolling away into the ocean with him, Pogoriki, Chikoriki, Docoriki, Bigoriki, and Ottoriki trapped inside...
24c	6c	"Deep Dark Secrets" (Russian: "Тайное общество")	September 26, 2009
Chikoriki and Pogoriki decide to start burying things they've collected and start a secret club, but what happens when Wolliriki joins in and begins questioning their motives?
25a	7a	"Tough Luck" (Russian: "Скверная примета")	October 3, 2009
Wolliriki wakes up on the wrong side of the bed and decides to look in a superstition book about it. Then, when similarly unlucky predicaments happen to Docoriki and Chikoriki, he gets them convinced in his superstitions too.
25b	7b	"Happy Daze" (Russian: "Счастьемёт")	October 3, 2009
Ottoriki is convinced that he is a failure and decides to get rid of all his inventions. Wanting to cheer him up, Pogoriki and Chikoriki find a gun that Otto claims will make people smile. However, they have to travel all across the junkyard to find the missing component.
25c	7c	"Who's Sorry Now?" (Russian: "Утерянные извинения")	October 3, 2009
Rosariki tries to clean up Wolliriki's room to make him feel better, but he snaps at her to leave it the way it is and she runs away, upset. She goes to Olgariki to talk about what happened, and Olga tells her a story about a past lover.
26a	8a	"Home Away from Home" (Russian: "Ремонт - дело коллективное")	October 10, 2009
Pogoriki makes 'renovations' on his house and has to move in with his friends, but he ends up proving that he's more than a bad houseguest.
26b	8b	"Quackleaf Blues" (Russian: "Некультурный")	October 10, 2009
After Boboriki finds a bunch of Strawberry Quackleaves, a type of weed, destroying his garden, he, alongside Pogoriki and Chikoriki, have to work together to get rid of the weeds before they take away all of Bobo's hard work.
26c	8c	"Spaced Out" (Russian: "Космическая одиссея")	October 10, 2009
27a	9a	"Spaced Out" (Russian: "Космическая одиссея")	October 15, 2009 (Canada); October 17, 2009 (US)
Part 1: After their communication goes dark on Otto's end, Ottoriki takes off on a trip to space to find and rescue his friend, Roboriki. Unfortunately, Pogoriki and Chikoriki sneak aboard as stowaways... Part 2: After the ship is hit by an asteroid and Ottoriki nearly dies, the three are rescued by Roboriki.
27b	9b	"History in the Faking" (Russian: "В начале было слово")	October 15, 2009 (Canada); October 17, 2009 (US)
After a disagreement between Wolliriki and Bigoriki over his biography of the day, everyone decides to write their own takes on history. Unfortunately, nobody writes a very honest one...
27c	9c	"Sweet Temptation" (Russian: "Горы и конфеты")	October 15, 2009 (Canada); October 17, 2009 (US)
Wolliriki loves to sit and look at the mountains with Rosariki, but she finds them boring and won't do it unless Wolli brings her candy. But, after getting sick from eating too much, she realizes that just being with a friend can be sweet enough.
28a	10a	"A Work in Progress" (Russian: "Двигатель прогресса")	October 16, 2009 (Canada); October 24, 2009 (US)
Wanting progress in his life, Pogoriki decides to become an inventor. Unfortunately for Ottoriki and Chikoriki, he thinks of ideas very late at night and everything he 'invents' already has been.
28b	10b	"From Zero to Hero" (Russian: "Дар")	October 16, 2009 (Canada); October 24, 2009 (US)
After reading a comic book, Rosariki wishes she had super powers. When a bolt of lightning strikes her house and electrifies her, giving her shocking new superpowers, she finds they can be more trouble than they're worth.
28c	10c	"Reach for the Stars" (Russian: "Подарок судьбы")	October 16, 2009 (Canada); October 24, 2009 (US)
After a perfect day of playing in the field, Wolliriki learns from Docoriki that his horoscope says he will get a gift today. However, Wolli ends up ruining his perfect day trying to find it.
29a	11a	"Down on His Luck" (Russian: "Полоса невезения")	October 19, 2009 (Canada); October 31, 2009 (US)
Bigoriki thinks he's been cursed with bad luck, but Boboriki thinks he can use this to his advantage.
29b	11b	"Dream Maker" (Russian: "Снотворец")	October 19, 2009 (Canada); October 31, 2009 (US)
Wolliriki says he never dreams and it is later learned that he writes the dreams of others. After writing everyone else's dreams exhausts him, they decide to make his dream come true.
29c	11c	"Snore Energy" (Russian: "Энергия храпа")	October 19, 2009 (Canada); October 31, 2009 (US)
While helping Chikoriki clean out his house, Pogoriki finds a light bulb. As the village has no electricity, they take it to Ottoriki and he comes up with the idea to use a unique type of energy to make it light up.
30a	12a	"Poetry Emotion"" (Russian: "Как здорово сочинять стихи")	October 20, 2009 (Canada); November 7, 2009 (US)
After a boring day, Rosariki decides she needs a hobby. She visits Wolliriki and decides to become a poet much to his dismay.
30b	12b	"Cooking Up a Storm" (Russian: "Кулинария")	October 20, 2009 (Canada); November 7, 2009 (US)
Docoriki decides to teach the others how to be a chef, but his efforts leave a bad taste in everyone's mouth but Boboriki's.
30c	12c	"Sun Spots" (Russian: "Фанерное солнце")	October 20, 2009 (Canada); November 7, 2009 (US)
It's fall and Wolliriki is depressed since summer is his favorite season. Meanwhile, after Pogoriki and Chikoriki fail to catch up to the sun and get in one last tan before winter, they decide to make their own sun.
31a	13a	"Topsy Turvy" (Russian: "Вестибулярный аппарат")	October 21, 2009 (Canada); November 14, 2009 (US)
After getting up fast from standing on their heads, Pogoriki and Chikoriki get very dizzy. Docoriki trains them how not to get dizzy and they help a miserable Wolli feel better about himself.
31b	13b	"Silent Treatment" (Russian: "Бойкот")	October 21, 2009 (Canada); November 14, 2009 (US)
Rosariki is having a fabulous day, but when she tries to share it with the others, they tell her to stop bothering them while they're working, so she decides to ignore them all and start a boycott.
31c	13c	"Destination Frustration" (Russian: "Смысл жизни")	October 21, 2009 (Canada); November 14, 2009 (US)
Wolliriki starts to wonder if his life has a purpose, so Bigoriki takes him on a journey to find it.
32a	14a	"A Valuable Lesson" (Russian: "Настоящие ценности")	December 17, 2009 (Canada)
Pogoriki has a carrot collection that fills forty crates. Rosariki asks him for help with something and offers him a carrot for his collection as payment. Soon, the entire village is using carrots for currency!
32b	14b	"Robo's Return" (Russian: "Каникулы Биби")	December 17, 2009 (Canada)
Roboriki returns from his voyage in space to visit Ottoriki and the others.
32c	14c	"Time Will Tell" (Russian: "Кто первый?")	December 17, 2009 (Canada)
Rosariki and Wolliriki had planned to meet for a springtime brunch, but Rosa turned her clock ahead too soon and arrives an hour early. Believing that Wolliriki was late, the two start quarreling. When she later learns the mistake was hers, she plans to apologize, but hopes Wolliriki will make the first move.
33a	15a	"The Bench" (Russian: "Скамейка")	December 18, 2009 (Canada)
Pogoriki has made a bench and painted it. While waiting for the painting to dry, he and Chikoriki try to find something to do with the rest of the paint.
33b	15b	"Maze Craze" (Russian: "Лабиринт")	December 18, 2009 (Canada)
Boboriki is planning to plant some hedges to protect his crops from the strong winds. Docoriki decides to make it more interesting and makes a hedge labyrinth. Unfortunately, he makes it so complicated that nobody can get in and Boboriki can't get out...
33c	15c	"Tell It Like It Is" (Russian: "Роман в письмах")	December 18, 2009 (Canada)
Wolliriki decides to admit his love to Rosariki, but can't find the right way to tell her. He decides to use poetry to tell her; how hard can it be? You'd be surprised...
34a	16a	"Scoop" (Russian: "Большой куш")	September 19, 2011 (UK); September 20, 2011 (US)
OttoRiki's gambling machine becomes a huge hit with the villagers, despite their chances to actually win something other than a carrot being very thin.
34b	16b	"Golf" (Russian: "Гольф")	September 19, 2011 (UK); September 20, 2011 (US)
Pogoriki is trying to help Chikoriki to enjoy golf but Chikoriki has a hard time playing it. First he hits the ball into Docoriki's coffee, then he hits Boboriki.
34c	16c	"Personal Life" (Russian: "Личная жизнь")	September 19, 2011 (UK); September 20, 2011 (US)
Strange things start to happen in the valley: Bigoriki is frantically searching for an old box, Olgariki is crazily collecting chamomiles, and Boboriki is building an underground bunker. What's going on in their personal lives?

== See also ==
- List of Kikoriki episodes
