= Petersburg Animation Studio =

Russian animation studio

Computer Animation Studio, Petersburg
- Industry: Animation; Motion pictures
- Founded: March 2003; 23 years ago
- Headquarters: Saint Petersburg, Russia
- Key people: Nadezhda Kuznetsova (Director); Anatoly Prokhorov (founder); Salavat Shaikhinurov; Ilya Popov
- Products: Animated films
- Number of employees: 150+
- Website: skapetersburg.ru

Computer Animation Studio, Petersburg (Russian: Студия компьютерной анимации «Петербург») is a Saint Petersburg-based Russian studio which produces animated films.

== Filmography ==
- KikoRiki (Smešariki) (2003–2024)
  - Teeth, Tail and Ears (Зубы, хвост и уши) (Since 2010)
- KikoRiki: Team Invincible (Смешарики. Начало) (2011)
- Chinti (2011)
- KikoRiki: Legend of the Golden Dragon (2016)
- BabyRiki (2017–present)
- KikoRiki: Deja Vu (2018)
- Finnick (2022)
- Agent Chekhov (2025)

== See also ==
- History of Russian animation
- List of animated feature films
