= KikoRiki: Team Invincible =

- Russian theatrical release poster
- Directed by: Denis Chernov
- Written by: Aleksey Lebedev; Mike de Sève; Michael Mennies
- Screenplay by: Aleksey Lebedev
- Based on: Kikoriki by Denis Chernov & Salavat Shaykhinurov
- Produced by: Ilya Popov; Anatoliy Prohorov; Timur Bekmambetov
- Starring: Mikhail Chernyak; Anton Vinogradov; Vladimir Postnikov; Svetlana Pismechenko; Vadim Bochanov; Sergey Mardar; Mikhail Khrustalyov
- Edited by: Aleksandr Para
- Music by: Marina Landa; Sergey Vasilyev
- Production companies: Petersburg Animation Studio; The Riki Group; Bazelevs; Cinema Foundation
- Distributed by: Karoprokat
- Release date: December 22, 2011
- Running time: 91 minutes
- Country: Russia
- Language: Russian
- Box office: $8.5 million

KikoRiki: Team Invincible (Russian: Смешарики. Начало, translit. Smeshariki Nachalo lit. KikoRiki: the Beginning) is a 2011 Russian animated film which serves as a prequel to the KikoRiki series. The film was released in Russia on December 22, 2011. In the United Kingdom, it was released on February 10, 2012. In the United States, it was released in 2017 along with its sequel by Shout! Factory and Odin's Eye Entertainment.

== Plot ==
Krash and Chiko fall into a cave while finding a place to bury their time capsule. Inside, they find an old TV set, which they take with them. When the Kikoriki gang activate the TV, they discover a superhero show known as Lucien, where the eponymous character, Lucien, fights Dr. Caligari, a villain who aspires to take over the world. Believing the show's events to be true, Carlin and Krash suggest the group should go to the city and help Lucien.

The next day, the Kikoriki gang build a raft and set off, leaving Wally, who considers their idea to be crazy, to watch over the lighthouse. However, he decides to follow and join the group on their mission. After a strong storm that damages the raft, the group eventually reach the city. They are quickly arrested and put into quarantine. Carlin believes that the law enforcement officers are agents of Caligari, and decides to send one of his group members to find Lucien, with Wally being chosen. In the process, Krash and Rosa notice that Chiko was left behind on the raft.

The next day, the rest of the Kikoriki gang are taken to the hospital to be vaccinated, and Wally escapes. In the city, he searches for Lucien and arrives at the city's TV studio, where the Lucien Show is being filmed. There, Wally meets Barry, the actor playing Lucien. In front of Wally, Barry quits the show, and the producer, Boss Nosor, contractually takes away all his property for debts, and gives his role to another actor, renaming the program the Julien Show. An upset Barry, not listening to what Wally is telling him, signs papers certifying that the Kikoriki gang had come to the city to visit him, and leaves. The Kikoriki gang follow Barry around, not knowing that Lucien is a work of fiction.

Meanwhile, Chiko is rescued by Pin, a guard of a museum, and, feeling sorry for him, lets him take shelter. That night, when two robbers break into the museum, Chiko inadvertently helps them rob the museum. He and Pin are eventually accused of being behind the robbery and arrested. The Kikoriki gang ask a depressed Barry to save Chiko, to no avail. Wally, knowing that Barry is just an actor, explains this to the others. They leave Barry's apartment, crestfallen.

The group decides that they will break Chiko out of prison themselves. Barry, who is tormented by how he inadvertently deceived the Kikoriki gang, finds them and suggests that they come up with a plan. He takes them to Gusen, the actor that played the main villain in The Lucien Show, Caligari. Out of old friendship with Barry, he makes up another plan — a plan to save Chiko. The Kikoriki gang infiltrate the prison, with Krash and Barry successfully freeing Chiko and Pin.

During the escape, an advertising blimp flies onto the roof of the prison. Barry jumps into the blimp, which is heading towards the sea. The others chase after him in their ice cream truck and catch up. The Kikoriki gang successfully board the blimp, and sees a light, which turns out to be the lighthouse that Wally left on earlier in the film. The airship then crash-lands into the lighthouse. All the Kikoriki gang survive, but are slightly injured. Wally, who has been trying to confess his love to Rosa throughout the journey, rehearses the confession next to her, thinking that she does not hear him. After a while, the Kikoriki gang surprise Barry by building him the house he always dreamed of.

Meanwhile, during a screening of a new episode of the Julien Show, Boss Nosor's true crimes with the robbers are suddenly exposed to the public. The robbers are then eventually arrested for their crimes with Gusen's help.

== Cast ==
- Mikhail Chernyak as Dokko, Pin and Lucien a.k.a. Barry
- Sergey Mardar as Carlin, Olga and 2nd Robber
- Anton Vinogradov as Krash, 1st Robber, Radio DJ and 2nd TV announcer
- Vladimir Postnikov as Chiko
- Svetlana Pismichenko as Rosa
- Vadim Bochanov as Wally
- Mikhail Khrustalyov as Dr. Caligari a.k.a. Eugene
- Stanislav Kontsevich as Boss
- Kseniya Brzhezovskaya as 1st TV announcer and Maria
- Vladimir Maslakov as Bull Cop and Prison Warden
- Elena Shulman as Nurse
- Alena Polikovskaya as Camel's wife and granny
- Sergey Vasilyev as Crocodile
- Igor Yakovel as Kikostankino's security
- Changir Suleymanov as Camel
- Oleg Kulikovich as Flamingo and Voice of "Jump to the Abyss"
- Valeriy Solovyov as Sheriff
- Andrey Lyovin as the 3rd TV announcer and Judge
- Nastya Pashenkova as Translator
- Denis Chernov as Homeless and Julien

== Production ==
An initial budget of $1 million was given to produce a "test film" to show to international partners. According to Marmelad-media's general director Ilya Popov, the final budget would depend on a number of factors, such as whether it will be sold internationally (in which case the budget would be up to $15 million) or limited to Russia (in which case it will cost around $3–4 million). Popov considered spending anything over $5 million to be unprofitable (the highest-grossing Russian animated film to date, Ilya Muromets and Nightingale the Robber, cost $2.5 million and made just under $10 million; since around half of the profits usually go to the distributors, if it had cost over $5 million it would not have been profitable).

== Release ==
The film was released domestically in December 2011 in Russia, but received a limited release in the UK in February 2012. The film is considered a well thought-through prequel, its plot explaining events that brought the nine animal characters together in the first place. On the RikiGroup YouTube channel, there is a trailer with a different English dub then the one released. (https://youtube.com/nz2b3zS903k?si=rtvsXdOAnSPltOyq) Notably it feature's the voice cast from the third English dub of the TV show.
