= Aleksey Lebedev (screenwriter) =

Russian screenwriter and actor (born 1973)

- Алексе́й Ле́бедев
- Born: Aleksey Vladimirovich Lebedev; 29 May 1973 (age 53); Murmansk, Soviet Union
- Occupations: Actor, screenwriter, playwright, director, film producer
- Years active: 1998–present
- Known for: Main screenwriter of the KikoRiki series

Aleksey Vladimirovich Lebedev (Russian: Алексе́й Влади́мирович Ле́бедев; born 29 May 1973, Murmansk) is a Russian screenwriter, playwright in animation, director, producer and voice actor. He is most notable for being the main screenwriter of the animated series KikoRiki.

== Biography ==
Aleksey Lebedev was born on 29 May 1973 in Murmansk.

He graduated from the Suvorov Military School in Leningrad and the St. Petersburg Humanitarian University of Trade Unions (director department, acting and directing course with Zinovy Korogodsky) in 1997. In 2001, he graduated from the faculty of Mathematics and Mechanics at the Saint Petersburg State University. For some time, he was working as an actor and director of the drama theatre and also as a software developer.

He wrote his first script in 1998 for a comedy film The Biedermeier Wardrobe which was never produced.

In 2003, he was invited to the newly created Petersburg Animation Studio as a candidate for the main screenwriter of the KikoRiki series. He was elected right away after trying different people and that is how he came to be the main screenwriter of the animated series. From 2003 to 2012 he wrote over 230 screenplays for the traditional six-minute episodes of the original series (164 of which were released from 2003 to 2012, and 10 of which were released in their 3D spin-off, and the last seven scripts were dedicated to the seven deadly sins), 12 10-minute screenplays for the 3D spin-off Kikoriki. New Adventures, and the full-length film Kikoriki. Team Invincible. During its time the film was very popular in Russia and abroad. His reaction to the film after he saw it himself was quite negative:

Literally, the script differs from the production in a couple of scenes, but the question is not in the letter, but in the spirit. I wrote a story about the conflict between man and civilization. Not knowing of TV by the main characters was a move that will make this conflict convex and textured. This is a convention, that very convention with which stories begin, such as "Imagine that somewhere good romantic idealists saw TV for the first time and went to save the world." That's Don Quixotic. As you know, the hidalgo also went to save everyone, after reading a lot of novels. But in the production, the story of "Team Invincible" turned out to be "about idiots in the city." So just imagine the production of Don Quixote, where everything will be letter-by-letter like Cervantes had, but, like, a comedy with a fool. It will not be interesting, because you don't worry about a fool, and it will not be funny, because this is not a comedy with a fool, and humor must be shown there by other means.

— Aleksey Lebedev

He also wrote a screenplay for the next film, Kikoriki. The Legend of the Golden Dragon, but was denied. The rest of his six-minute screenplays are being filmed in the new season that is being released since 2020.

In 2012, Aleksey Lebedev left the Petersburg Animation Studio to start production of his new project, The Nuclear Forest, but the series closed in 2014 due to low finances.

In 2015, Lebedev returned to the Kikoriki series for a while to write 11 screenplays for the 3D spin-off Kikoriki. Sport.

Since 2018, Aleksey Lebedev has cooperated with Soyuzmultfilm and is the author of two animated shows, Pirate School and Adventures of Petya and the Wolf.

== Filmography ==
=== Screenwriter ===
- Kikoriki (2003–2012; 2020–2024)
- Kikoriki. Team Invincible (2011)
- Kikoriki. New Adventures in 3D (2012–2013)
- Nuclear Forest (2012–2014)
- Kikoriki. Sport (2015)
- Pirate School (2018–2020)
- Adventures of Petya and the Wolf (2018–present)
- Kikoriki. Operation Santa Claus (2019)

=== Director, producer, and Animator ===
- Nuclear Forest (2012–2014)
- Pirate School (2018–2020)
- Adventures of Petya and the Wolf (2018–present)

=== Voice actor (selected) ===
- Kikoriki (2003–2012) — football commentator, voice (episodes "The Weed!" and "Soccer Game, 1st Half")
- Nuclear Forest (2012–2014) — Mikhail "Michel" Lermontov, voice
