= BabyRiki =

Russian children's animated TV series

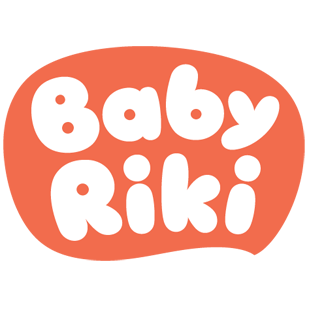
- Genre: Edutainment; Musical
- Created by: Ilya Popov; Maria Bolshakova
- Based on: KikoRiki
- Creative director: Elena Chernova
- Opening theme: "It's BabyRiki time!"
- Country of origin: Russia
- Original languages: Russian; English
- No. of seasons: 6
- No. of episodes: 266

Production
- Producers: Ilya Popov; Yulia Osetinskaya; Alexandra Artemyeva
- Running time: 5 minutes
- Production companies: FUN Union; Petersburg animation studio

Related
- KikoRiki

BabyRiki (Russian: Малышарики) is a Russian CGI children's animated television series that is a preschool spin-off of KikoRiki.

The series aired on Movile's PlayKids and Splash's Kabillion in the United States, and on ITVBe's LittleBe in the United Kingdom.
