= KikoRiki =

Russian animated television series

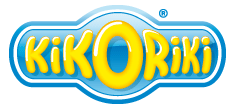
- Also known as: Smeshariki (Смешарики); GoGoRiki; BalloonToons
- Genre: Comedy drama
- Screenplay by: Aleksey Lebedev; Svetlana Mardagolimova; Dmitry Yakovenko
- Directed by: Denis Chernov; Konstantin Biryukov others
- Voices of: (See article)
- Composers: Marina Landa; Sergey Vasilyev
- Country of origin: Russia
- Original language: Russian
- No. of seasons: 5
- No. of episodes: 451 (list of episodes)

Production
- Executive producer: Yuliya Nikolaeva
- Producers: Ilya Popov; Aleksandr Gerasimov; Vyacheslav Mayasov
- Running time: 6 minutes, 30 seconds (seasons 1–2, 4); 10 minutes (season 3); 13 minutes (season 5)
- Production companies: The Riki Group; Petersburg Animation Studio

Original release
- Network: STS; Russia 1 KinoPoisk
- Release: December 22, 2003 – present

Related
- BabyRiki

KikoRiki, sometimes known outside Russia as GoGoRiki or BalloonToons, occasionally referred by the original Russian name: Smeshariki (Russian: Смешарики), is a Russian animated television series consisting of 451 episodes of 6 minutes and 30 seconds (and 11 minutes) each, aimed at children 3 to 8 years old. This series uses mostly both flash animation and computer animation.

The first episode premiered in Russia on December 22, 2003. The KikoRiki are stylized rounded animals. Its Russian name, Smeshariki, is a portmanteau of the words смешные, "funny" and шарики, "little balls". The series includes complex themes and specific cultural references. The series is aired in 60 countries, incl. China and those in the Middle East and the European Union, is translated to 15 languages and has an everyday audience of 50 million people. The audience in China surpassed the audience in Russia. As of 2020, episodes are currently available on KinoPoisk in Russia. After an 8-year hiatus, the show was renewed for a fourth and fifth season, which serve as a continuation for the original three seasons; it was sponsored by Yandex and the 120 new episodes were available exclusively on the Kinopoisk HD streaming service.

Over time, the series gained cult status, with critics praising it for writing, the variety of genres among episodes, including their philosophy, references to other works and the visual style. Some criticize the animation style for artistic primitivism, pointing out certain technical limitations.

== Distribution ==
English-language licensing rights to the series were acquired by 4Kids Entertainment from worldwide distributor Fun Game Media, Munich, with television distribution handled by CBS Television Distribution, and began airing as part of The CW4Kids programming block on The CW on September 27, 2008, under the name GoGoRiki, and continued to air until November 14, 2009, when The CW's broadcasting rights and 4Kids Entertainment's license agreement expired. Fun Game Media was also producing a European version, which began airing on KI.KA on December 8, 2008, which goes under the name "Kikoriki". It was also adapted for European broadcasting by the German company, Studio 100 Media in 2008 under the name "BalloonToons". In February 2017, all rights to KikoRiki and PinCode outside of the CIS territories, including KikoRiki episodes in all languages other than Russian, are owned by a newly formed company FUN Union based in Hong Kong. Since October 2024, worldwide rights to KikoRiki, PinCode, and BabyRiki are now owned by Animotion Media Group.

== Characters ==
- Krash (Russian: Крош, romanized: Krosh), a.k.a. Pogoriki and Jumpy, a male sky-blue-colored rabbit and the main protagonist of Kikoriki, who is eager to jump into new adventures. Krash has a pink nose, cerulean blue eyebrows, buckteeth, and a lighter blue tail on his rear. He was born on December 29. Voice: Anton Vinogradov (Russian) / Dan Green in the 4Kids dub, Peter Linz in the movies, Billy Bob Thompson in the FUN Union dub (English)
- Chiko (Russian: Ёжик, romanized: Yozhik, lit. 'a little hedgehog'), a.k.a. Chikoriki and Joshi, a male magenta-colored hedgehog who is Krash's best friend and has a shy and cautious personality. His hair is dark purple and spiky and wears purple glasses. Chiko also has a violet-red nose and eyebrows. He was born on February 14. While Krash is the brawn, Chiko is the brain. Voice: Vladimir Postnikov (Russian) / Jason Griffith in the 4Kids dub, Marc Thompson in the FUN Union dub (English)
- Rosa (Russian: Нюша, romanized: Nyusha), a.k.a. Rosariki and Pinky, a female light pink-colored pig who is described as a fashionista. Rosa has red hair with a white cherry-blossom on it, a carnation-pink snout, heart-shaped rosy pink cheeks, and red eyelids. She also has hands and feet on the edges of her arms and legs that are pink. She was born on July 13. Voice: Svetlana Pismichenko (Russian) / Kether Donohue in the 4Kids dub, Alyson Leigh Rosenfeld in the FUN Union dub (English)
- Pin (Russian: Пин, romanized: Pin), a.k.a. Ottoriki, a male black-and-white penguin of a German origin, who is a self-taught inventor. Pin wears a brown pilot hat with burgundy glasses attached in the front and his feet and beak are red. He was born on August 9. Voice: Mikhail Chernyak (Russian) / Bryan Fenkart in the 4Kids dub, Mike Pollock in the FUN Union dub (English)
- Barry (Russian: Копатыч, romanized: Kopatych, lit. 'Digych'), a.k.a. Boboriki and Berry, a male orange-colored bear with a southern accent who lives as a farmer. Barry is also a beekeeper and accordion musician. Barry wears a yellow farmer's hat with a round-edged brim, and has a brown nose, round circular cheeks underneath his eyes, black eyebrows, and a beige tail on his rear. He also has occasional honey binges, which isn't good for him, because it makes him sick. He was born on October 8. Voice: Mikhail Chernyak (Russian) / David Wills in the 4Kids dub, Mike Pollock in the FUN Union dub (English)
- Olga (Russian: Совунья, romanized: Sovun'ya, lit. 'Owlnya'), a.k.a. Olgariki, a purple female owl who often helps with her useful advice and wisdom. She acts like a caring grandma. Olga also is darker purple as seen on the top of her head and has bangs on ears and an orange beak. Olga wears a red-violet and orange-striped hat with a puffy ball on top, and has darker purple three-toed feet. She is also the doctor of the Round Country. She was born on September 15. Voice: Sergey Mardar (Russian) / Bella Hudson in the 4Kids dub, Sondra James in the movies, Lisa Flanagan in the FUN Union dub (English)
- Dokko (Russian: Лосяш, romanized: Losyash, lit. 'Mooseyash'), a.k.a. Docoriki and ElDoc, a golden-yellow male moose who is an eccentric and nerdy scientist. He also speaks with a British accent. Dokko has an orange nose and his horns and eyebrows are sepia-brown. He was born on May 25. Voice: Mikhail Chernyak (Russian) / David Wills in the 4Kids dub, Tyler Bunch in the FUN Union dub (English)
- Wally (Russian: Бараш, romanized: Barash, lit. 'Ramash'), a.k.a. Wolliriki and Fluff, a male lavender-colored ram. Wally writes poetry and has an unrequited love for Rosa. Wally has purple eyebrows, horns, a pudgy and ram-like nose, and darker purple hoof-like feet on the top of his hands and feet. He was born on April 29. Voice: Vadim Bochanov (Russian) / Wayne Grayson (English)
- Carlin (Russian: Кар-Карыч, romanized: Kar-Karych, lit. 'Caw Cawson'), a.k.a. Bigoriki and BigBig, a dark blue male raven who is Olga's friend. Carlin is a retired traveler with aristocratic mannerisms. He plays the piano and also enjoys his life as an artist. Carlin wears a navy-blue bow tie. His beak is yellow and his eyelids and feet are pink. Carlin also has a tail on his rear. He was born on March 3. Voice: Sergey Mardar (Russian) / Mike Pollock (English)

== Creators ==
The series of Kikoriki was created as part of the cultural-educational project "World Without Violence" within the Russian federal program "Forming bulwarks of tolerance and preventing extremism in Russian society". It is made with the help of the Ministry of Culture of the Russian Federation and with the participation of the company "Master-Film" at the computer animation studio "Peterburg", which was created in March 2000 specifically for Smeshariki.

- Director of the Series: Denis Chernov
- Other directors: Ilya Maksimov, Cangir Süleymanov, Oleg Musin, Aleksey Minchenok, Natalia Mirzoyan, Konstantin Biryukov, Aleksey Gorbunov, Mikhail Meschaninov, Andrey Kolpin, Artur Tolstobrov, Sergey Gordeev, Anna Borisova, Aleksandra Averyanova, Alexandra Kovtun, Alla Yaroshenko, Darina Schmidt (under the pseudonym «Dmitri Shum»), Svetlana Mardagolimova, Marina Moshkova, Polina Stepanova, Roman Sokolov, Galina Voropay, Daria Melnikova, Inga Korzhnyova, Yekaterina Shturmak, Andrey Bakhurin, Yuri Kutyumov, Elizaveta Perepyolkina
- Main music and song composers: Sergey Vasilyev and Marina Landa (except for episodes 24 and 25)
- Other composers: Aleksey Yakovel (11), Sergey Kiselyov (24–25, 27), Evgeniya Zaritskaya (27)
- Sound operators: Igor Yakovel (every episode except 108), Evgeny Yakovel (40–55), Denis Dushin (starting from episode 56, except for 116)
- Artistic supervisor: Anatoliy Prokhorov, Sergey Vasilyev (starting with 272)
- Storyboarders (according to the IMDb): Lionel Allaix, Yoshimichi Tamura, Marco Allard, Didier Ah-Koon, Denis Chernov, Frédéric Martin, Fabrice Fouquet, Geoffroy de Crécy, Arthur Qwak, Tae-Sik Shin, Alberto Rodriguez, Carlos Zapater, Thomas Szabo, Martial Harivel, Javier Ara, Stéphane Mit, Dominique Debar, Olivier Derynck, Joeri Christiaen
- General producer: Ilya Popov
- Co-producers: Aleksandr Gerasimov, Vyacheslav Mayasov
- Leading director: Denis Chernov
- Animators: Sergey Lyutsenko, Sergey Smirnov, Irina Kolesnikova
- Leading writer: Aleksey Lebedev, Svetlana Mardagolimova, Dmitri Yakovenko
- Other screenwriters: Anastasiya Azeeva, German Molchanov, Oksana Tarabanova, Igor Shevchuk, Mariya Kulidzhanova, Anna Palkina, Tatyana Belova, Vadim Bochanov, Fyodor Shilov, Natalia Pesochinskaya, Jordan Kefalidi
- Art director: Salavat Shaykhinurov

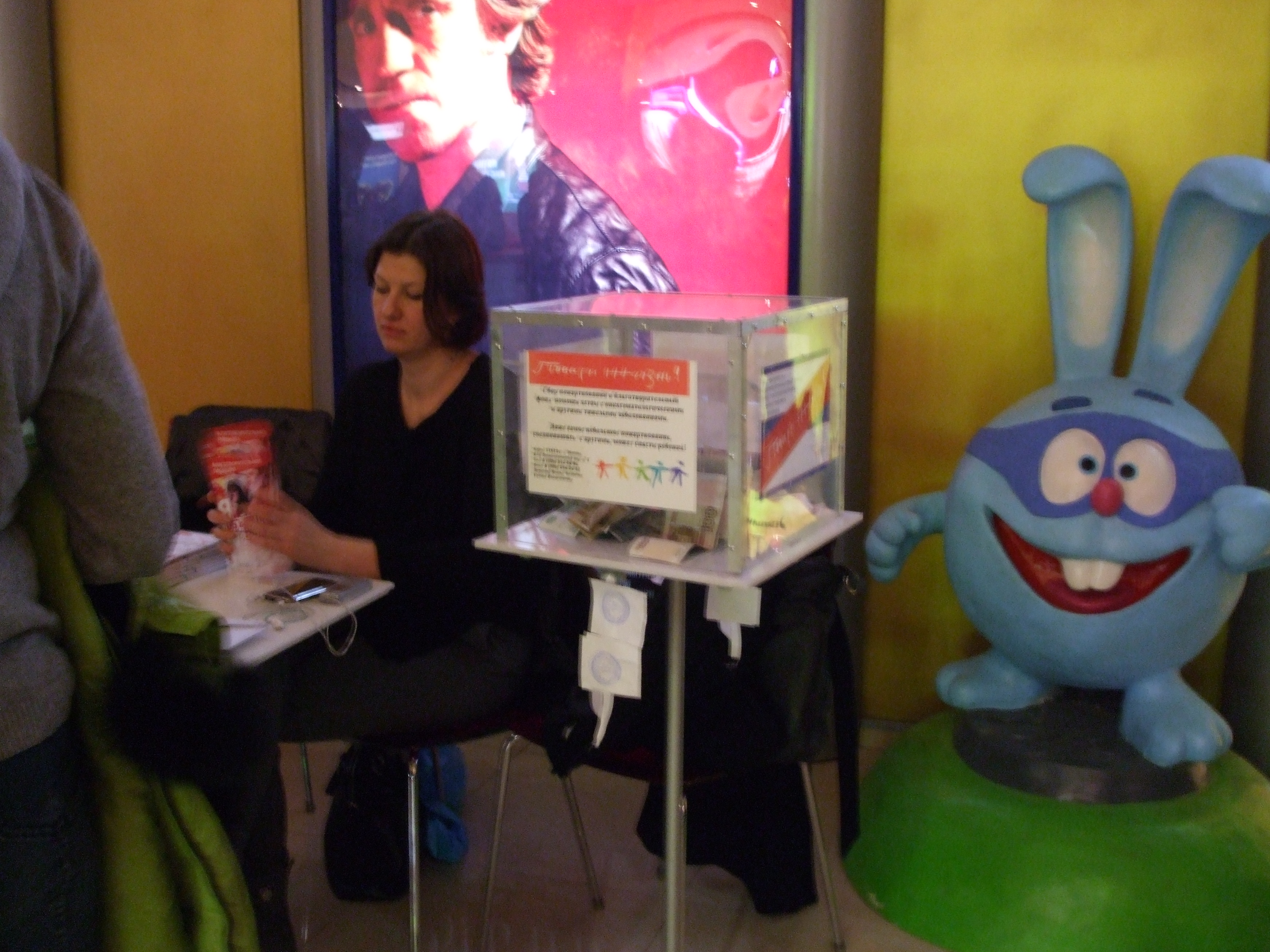
Kikoriki premiere in Moscow and charity box featuring a statue of Krash

== Films ==
On January 24, 2007, it was announced that a Smeshariki/Kikoriki feature film was to be made by the St. Petersburg company "Marmelad-media" (which owns the brand) to be released in December 2011. This film was shot in 3D CGI, unlike the 2D Flash-animated series. An initial budget of $1 million was given to produce a "test film" to show to international partners. According to Marmelad-media's general director Ilya Popov, the final budget would depend on a number of factors, such as whether it will be sold internationally (in which case the budget would be up to $15 million) or limited to Russia (in which case it will cost around $3–4 million). Popov considered spending anything over $5 million to be unprofitable (the highest-grossing Russian animated film to date, Ilya Muromets and Nightingale the Robber, cost $2.5 million and made just under $10 million; since around half of the profits usually go to the distributors, if it had cost over $5 million it would not have been profitable). The film was released domestically in December 2011, but received a limited release in the UK in early 2012. The film was considered a well-thought-through prequel, its plot explaining events that brought the nine animal characters together in the first place.

Two other films entitled Kikoriki: Legend of the Golden Dragon and Kikoriki: Deja Vu were released on March 17, 2016, and April 26, 2018.

== Spinoffs of Kikoriki ==
=== The ABCs of Safety (2006–2012) ===
"The ABCs of Safety of the Kikoriki" (Russian: Азбука безопасности Смешариков) is a series of instructional and educational short cartoons. A total of 73 episodes were issued, lasting either one minute and thirty seconds, or the conventional six minutes and thirty seconds. Each episode was part of several categories: traffic safety, Fundamentals of safety and life, health, morals, reading skills, children's rights, etc.

After a long hiatus, in August 2017, a new category of episodes, titled "ABCs of the Internet" debuted, where the characters are taught to work on the Internet.

=== New Adventures ===
"KikoRiki: New Adventures" (Russian: Смешарики. Новые приключения) is a series of 3D CGI shorts starring the original characters, designed as a continuation of the original 2D shorts, as well as the third season of the series. It was broadcast from October 27, 2012, to December 28, 2013, consisting of 57 episodes. This series was scheduled for November 11, 2011, but the actual premiere on the "Channel One" was held on October 27, 2012.

=== Sport ===
This is a continuation of "Kikoriki. New Adventures" which also uses 3D CG graphics. The premiere is dated September 1, 2017, and took place on the official YouTube channel of this animated series.

=== Pin-Code ===
"Pin-Code" (Russian: Пин-код) is an educational spinoff designed to develop interest in inventing, programming and science in children from 4 to 14 years old. Initially, it was supposed to be done in flash-animation (such as the pilot episode "Runaway Rocket"), but later this idea was abandoned and production began in 3D computer animation instead. The show airs on Channel One on Sundays at 8:45 at Moscow time. From January 18, 2015, to February 7, 2016, the new season of the series aired under the title "Leap to the Future".

In the first season, the characters travel on the Umflier (later renamed to Sphere-Jet), a ship invented by Pin, which can travel through the air, under the water, underground, and even in space. The adventures of the heroes are accompanied by stories of Dokko and Pin about the world around them. Each episode of the season, having the subtitle "Nobel Season", ends with information about Nobel Prize winners (narrated by Andrei Levin).

The plot of the second season "Jump to the Future" is built around time travel, in which the characters are sent using the unique invention, the "Spheroscope-3000" (Russian: Шароскоп-3000), capable of answering any scientific questions. Pin thinks that it is impossible to interfere with the opening of the future, and Dokko, on the contrary, is obsessed with the idea of knowing everything. Now all the Kikoriki are used to the Spheroscope and they learn about the inventions of the future. September 1, 2017, marked the premiere of the new, third season of the "Pin-Code".

=== BabyRiki ===
This is a preschool version of this series and was created with the same company, being named BabyRiki.

=== Panda and Krash ===
In May 2019, in Beijing as part of the talks between Asian civilizations, Russian and Chinese animators have made two agreements regarding cooperation, one of which involves the joint creation of the cartoon entitled Panda and Krash. The Chinese side of this project will be represented by the animation division of the Central Television Agency of China.

== Merchandise ==
Character stickers on bananas depicting a Kikoriki character holding a peeled banana have been used by Russian company Navkus (Навкус) and a banana sticker promoting the show has the line "Poprobuy Mul'tik Na Vkus" ("Taste the Cartoon").

== Video game ==
A Club Penguin-like video game based on the series was released and titled Shararam. An English version of the game was released under the title of RolyPolyLand.

== See also ==
- Timbuctoo, animals by Roger Hargreaves, the creator of Mr. Men
