= List of 3D films (2005–present) =

List of 3D films since 2005

This is a list of 3D films released in theaters and Blu-ray 3D since 2005.

== Feature films ==
Films listed as either "Filmed in 2D" or "Rendered in 2D" in the Camera Systems were converted from 2D to 3D during post-production.

=== 2000s ===
==== 2005 ====
Title	Release date	Prod. country	Camera system	Aspect ratio	Runtime min	Notes
Aliens of the Deep	January 28, 2005	United States	Fusion Camera System	1.78:1	47	Presented in 35mm for Fusion Camera System 3D presentations, and also presented in 70mm as IMAX 3D blow-ups for dual strip presentations.
Wild Safari 3D	April 8, 2005	Belgium	Dual 35mm	1.43:1	40	Released in dual 70mm IMAX 3D blow-ups.
The Adventures of Sharkboy and Lavagirl in 3-D	June 10, 2005	United States	Fusion Camera System	1.85:1	93	Only select scenes in anaglyph 3D, and the rest of the scenes were in 2D.
Magnificent Desolation: Walking on the Moon 3D	September 23, 2005	United States	IMAX 3D	1.43:1	40	Released in IMAX 3D.
Chicken Little	November 4, 2005	United States	Rendered in 2D	1.85:1	81	3D conversion by Industrial Light & Magic (ILM). The first Walt Disney Pictures film to be presented and released in Disney Digital 3-D since Melody and Working for Peanuts.

==== 2006 ====
Title	Release date	Prod. country	Camera system	Aspect ratio	Runtime min	Notes
Deep Sea 3D	March 3, 2006	Canada United States	IMAX 3D	1.43:1	41	Released in IMAX 3D.
Ice Age: The Meltdown	March 31, 2006	United States	Rendered in 2D	1.85:1	91	Originally released in 2006, the film was re-released in 3D exclusively in China.
Superman Returns	June 28, 2006	United States	Filmed in 2D	2.39:1	154	Only 20 minutes of footage were converted from 2D to 3D in post-production for IMAX 3D theaters, and the rest of the scenes were in 2D. The first Legendary Pictures and DC Comics film to be presented and released in stereoscopic 3D.
Monster House	July 21, 2006	United States	Digital 3D	2.39:1	91	The first Columbia Pictures and Amblin Entertainment film to be presented and released in stereoscopic 3D.
The Ant Bully	July 28, 2006	United States	Digital 3D	1.85:1	89	The stereoscopic 3D version is only in IMAX 3D theaters as 70mm blow-ups.
Open Season	September 29, 2006	United States	Digital 3D	1.85:1	86	The stereoscopic 3D version is only in IMAX 3D theaters as 70mm blow-ups. The first Sony Pictures Animation film to be presented and released in stereoscopic 3D.
Tim Burton's The Nightmare Before Christmas	October 20, 2006	United States	Filmed in 2D	1.85:1	76	3D conversion by Industrial Light & Magic (ILM). Originally released in 2D in 1993.
Night of the Living Dead 3D	November 10, 2006	United States	HD3Cam	1.85:1	80	Released in both 35mm anaglyphic and Digital 3D theaters.

==== 2007 ====
Title	Release date	Prod. country	Camera system	Aspect ratio	Runtime min	Notes
Lions 3D: Roar of the Kalahari	January 26, 2007	United States	Filmed in IMAX 2D	1.43:1	40	3D conversion of the 2005 film Roar: Lions of the Kalahari.
Dinosaurs Alive!	March 30, 2007	United States	IMAX 3D	1.43:1	40	
Meet the Robinsons	March 30, 2007	United States	Rendered in 2D	1.85:1	95	3D conversion by Digital Domain. Also presented on 35mm for non-digital 3D theaters.
Dinosaurs: Giants of Patagonia	April 5, 2007	Canada	IMAX 3D	1.43:1	40	
African Adventure: Safari in the Okavango 3D	May 1, 2007	Belgium	Dual 35 mm	1.43:1	40	Animated scenes filmed in 70mm. Released in dual 70mm blow-ups.
Ratatouille	June 29, 2007	United States		2.39:1	111	Originally released in 2D in 2007. Re-rendered in 3D for Blu-ray release.
Harry Potter and the Order of the Phoenix	July 11, 2007	United States	Filmed in 2D	2.39:1	139	Most of the film was shown in 2D as filmed. However, IMAX 3D theaters presented 70mm blow-ups with 20 minutes of footage converted from 2D to 3D
Sea Monsters: A Prehistoric Adventure	October 5, 2007	United States	Digital 3D	1.43:1	40	Released in IMAX 3D.
Beowulf	November 16, 2007	United States	Digital 3D	2.35:1	115	Also released in IMAX 3D and Dolby 3D. The first Paramount Pictures film to be presented and released in stereoscopic 3D.
Oxygène: New Master Recording	November 26, 2007	France Belgium		1.85:1	80	Also screened in theaters in Europe.

==== 2008 ====
Title	Release date	Prod. country	Camera system	Aspect ratio	Runtime min	Notes
U2 3D	January 23, 2008	United States	Fusion Camera System and 3ality Technica 3D Rigs	1.85:1	85	Also released in dual 70mm. Also released in IMAX 3D and Dolby 3D.
Hannah Montana & Miley Cyrus: Best of Both Worlds Concert	February 1, 2008	United States	Fusion Camera System	1.85:1	74	Also released in Dolby 3D.
Dolphins and Whales 3D: Tribes of the Ocean	February 15, 2008	United States	Dual HD	1.43:1	42	Released in IMAX 3D.
3D Sun	March 1, 2008	United States	Dual HD	1.43:1		Released in IMAX 3D.
Grand Canyon Adventure: River at Risk	March 14, 2008	United States	IMAX 3D	1.43:1	44	
Wild Ocean	March 18, 2008	Canada	IMAX 3D, Fusion Camera System, and dual 35mm	1.43:1	45	Released in IMAX 3D.
Scar	April 10, 2008	United States		1.78:1	90	
Kung Fu Panda	June 6, 2008	United States	Rendered in 2D	2.35:1	92	Originally released in 2D in 2008, converted from 2D to 3D during post-production for re-release.
Journey to the Center of the Earth	July 11, 2008	United States	Fusion Camera System	1.85:1	92	Also released in Dolby 3D and 4DX. The first New Line Cinema film to be presented and released in stereoscopic 3D, as well as the first American film to debut a new 4DX format created by CJ 4DPLEX Corporation.
Fly Me to the Moon	August 15, 2008	Belgium	Digital 3D	1.85:1	85	The first Summit Entertainment film to be presented and released in stereoscopic 3D.
Goat Story	October 16, 2008	Czech Republic	Filmed in 2D	2.35:1	80	
Bolt	November 21, 2008	United States	Digital 3D	1.85:1	96	Also released in Dolby 3D.

==== 2009 ====
Title	Release date	Prod. country	Camera system	Aspect ratio	Runtime min	Notes
My Bloody Valentine 3D	January 16, 2009	United States	Red One Cameras and Paradise FX 3D	1.85:1	101	The first Lionsgate film to be presented and released in stereoscopic 3D. Also released in Dolby 3D and 4DX.
Coraline	February 6, 2009	United States	Digital 3D	1.85:1	101	Also released in Dolby 3D and 4DX. The first Focus Features and Laika film to be presented and released in stereoscopic 3D.
Jonas Brothers: The 3D Concert Experience	February 27, 2009	United States	Fusion Camera System	1.85:1	76	Also released in IMAX 3D, Dolby 3D, and 4DX.
Under the Sea 3D	February 13, 2009	United States; Canada	IMAX 3D	1.43:1	40	
Monsters vs. Aliens	March 27, 2009	United States	Digital 3D	2.35:1	94	Also released in IMAX 3D, Dolby 3D, and 4DX. The first DreamWorks Animation film to be presented and released in stereoscopic 3D.
Alien Trespass	April 3, 2009	United States	Filmed in 2D	1.85:1	90	
Battle for Terra	May 1, 2009	United States	Digital 3D	2.35:1	90	
Up	May 29, 2009	United States	Digital 3D	1.85:1	96	Also released in Dolby 3D and 4DX. The first Pixar Animation Studios film to be presented and released in Disney Digital 3-D. The first 3D film to win an Academy Award for Best Animated Feature. Along with James Cameron's Avatar, the first 3D films to be nominated for the Academy Award for Best Picture.
Call of the Wild	June 15, 2009	United States		1.85:1	87	
Ice Age: Dawn of the Dinosaurs	July 1, 2009	United States	Digital 3D	1.85:1	94	Also released in Dolby 3D and 4DX. The first 20th Century Fox Animation and Blue Sky Studios film to be presented and released in stereoscopic 3D.
Harry Potter and the Half-Blood Prince	July 15, 2009	United States	Filmed in 2D	2.39:1	153	Most of the film was shown in 2D as filmed. However, IMAX 3D theaters presented 70mm prints with 15 minutes of footage converted from 2D to 3D.
G-Force	July 24, 2009	United States	Filmed in 2D	2.39:1	88	Also released in Dolby 3D and 4DX.
OceanWorld 3D	August 9, 2009	France	Digital 3D	1.85:1	81	
Samurai Sentai Shinkenger the Movie: The Fateful War	August 8, 2009	Japan			20	
X Games 3D: The Movie	August 21, 2009	United States		1.85:1	92	
The Final Destination	August 28, 2009	United States	Fusion Camera System	2.39:1	82	Also released in Dolby 3D and 4DX.
Garfield's Pet Force	September 11, 2009 (Note: The film was released as direct-to-video on June 16, 2009, in the United States. Internationally, it was theatrically released in select countries.)	United States	Digital 3D	1.85:1	79	
Cloudy with a Chance of Meatballs	September 18, 2009	United States	Digital 3D	2.35:1	90	Also released in IMAX 3D, Dolby 3D, and 4DX.
Haunting of Winchester House	September 29, 2009	United States		1.78:1	86	
Turtle: The Incredible Journey	October 1, 2009	United Kingdom	Digital 3D	1.85:1	81	
Toy Story	October 2, 2009	United States	Re-rendered in 3D	1.85:1	81	Also released in Dolby 3D. Originally released in 2D in 1995; re-rendered as a stereoscopic 3D version in Disney Digital 3-D.
Toy Story 2	October 2, 2009	United States	Re-rendered in 3D	1.85:1	92	Also released in Dolby 3D. Originally released in 2D in 1999; re-rendered as a stereoscopic 3D version in Disney Digital 3-D.
Dark Country	October 6, 2009	United States		1.85:1	88	
The Shock Labyrinth	October 17, 2009	Japan		1.85:1	89	
Boogie	October 22, 2009	Argentina		1.78:1	82	The first Argentinian animated film in 3D.
Michael Jackson's This Is It	October 28, 2009	United States	Fusion Camera System	1.78:1	113	Filmed in 2D with select scenes in 3D.
Disney's A Christmas Carol	November 6, 2009	United States	Digital 3D	2.39:1	96	Also released in IMAX 3D, Dolby 3D, and 4DX.
Larger Than Life in 3D	December 11, 2009	United States			88	
James Cameron's Avatar	December 18, 2009	United States	Fusion Camera System	1.78:1 and 2.39:1	162	Also released in IMAX 3D, Dolby 3D, and 4DX. The first 20th Century Fox and Lightstorm Entertainment film to be presented and released in stereoscopic 3D. 3D conversion and design by Stereo D. IMAX 3D theaters showed an IMAX DMR blow-ups with an aspect ratio of 1.78:1. Presented in both 1.78:1 and 2.39:1 aspect ratios in RealD 3D theaters. Along with Up, the first 3D films to be nominated for the Academy Award for Best Picture.

=== 2010s ===
==== 2010 ====
Title	Release date	Prod. country	Camera system	Aspect ratio	Runtime min	Notes
Yu-Gi-Oh! Bonds Beyond Time	January 23, 2010	Japan	Filmed in 2D	1.85:1	49	Dubbed into English and released in select theaters on February 26, 2011.
True Legend	February 9, 2010 (China) February 11, 2010 (Hong Kong)	China Hong Kong	Filmed in 2D	2.35:1	115 (only around 20 in 3D)	First Chinese film (partially) in 3D.
The Ultimate Wave Tahiti	February 12, 2010	United States	IMAX 3D	1.43:1	45	
Alice in Wonderland	March 5, 2010	United States	Filmed in 2D	1.85:1	109	3D conversion by Legend3D. Also released in IMAX 3D, Dolby 3D, and 4DX.
Space Dogs	March 18, 2010	Russia	Rendered in 2D	1.85:1	85	
Hubble 3D	March 19, 2010	United States	IMAX 3D	1.43:1	45	
How to Train Your Dragon	March 26, 2010	United States	Digital 3D	2.35:1	98	Also released in IMAX 3D, Dolby 3D, and 4DX.
Clash of the Titans	April 2, 2010	United States	Filmed in 2D	2.39:1	106	Also released in Dolby 3D and 4DX. 3D conversion by Prime Focus.
Kenny Chesney: Summer in 3D	April 21, 2010	USA	3ality Technica TS5 3D Rigs	1.78:1	99	
Magic Journey to Africa	May 7, 2010	Spain	Digital 3D	1.85:1	90	
Sea Rex 3D: Journey to a Prehistoric World	May 14, 2010	United Kingdom France		1.78:1	41	
StreetDance 3D	May 21, 2010	United Kingdom	Red One Cameras and Paradise FX 3D	1.85:1	98	Also released in Dolby 3D and 4DX.
Shrek Forever After	May 21, 2010	United States	Digital 3D	2.35:1	93	Also released in IMAX 3D, Dolby 3D, and 4DX.
Arabia 3D	May 24, 2010	United States	IMAX 3D	1.43:1	40	
Une nuit au cirque	May 26, 2010	France	Digital 3D	1.85:1	114	
Legends of Flight	June 11, 2010	Canada	IMAX 3D	1.43:1	42	
Toy Story 3	June 18, 2010	United States	Digital 3D	1.85:1	103	Also released in IMAX 3D, Dolby 3D, and 4DX. Won Academy Award for Best Animated Feature; nominated for Academy Award for Best Picture.
The Last Airbender	July 1, 2010	United States	Filmed in 2D	2.35:1	103	Also released in Dolby 3D and 4DX. 3D conversion by Stereo D. The first Nickelodeon Movies film to be presented and released in stereoscopic 3D.
Despicable Me	July 9, 2010	United States	Digital 3D	1.85:1	95	Also released in Dolby 3D and 4DX. The first Universal Pictures and Illumination Entertainment film to be presented and released in stereoscopic 3D.
Cats & Dogs: The Revenge of Kitty Galore	July 30, 2010	United States	Filmed in 2D	1.85:1	82	
A Turtle's Tale: Sammy's Adventures	August 4, 2010	Belgium	Digital 3D	2.35:1	88	
Step Up 3D	August 6, 2010	United States	Fusion Camera System	1.85:1	107	The first Touchstone Pictures film to be presented and released in stereoscopic 3D.
Moomins and the Comet Chase	August 6, 2010	Finland	Filmed in 2D	1.78:1	77	
Kamen Rider W (Double) Forever: AtoZ/Gaia Memories of Fate	August 7, 2010	Japan		1.78:1	66	Part of the Kamen Rider franchise
Piranha 3D	August 20, 2010	United States	Filmed in 2D	2.39:1	88	
Avatar: Special Edition	August 27, 2010	United States	Fusion Camera System	1.78:1 and 2.39:1	171	3D conversion and design by Stereo D. Also released in IMAX 3D, Dolby 3D, and 4DX.
Gaturro	September 9, 2010	Argentina Mexico	Digital 3D	1.78:1	86	First 3D film by Anima Studios.
Resident Evil: Afterlife	September 10, 2010	United States	Fusion Camera System	2.39:1	97	Also released in IMAX 3D, Dolby 3D, and 4DX. The first Screen Gems film to be presented and released in stereoscopic 3D.
Guardians of the Lost Code	September 16, 2010	Mexico	Filmed in 2D	2.35:1	90	First Mexican 3D film.
Cave of Forgotten Dreams	September 13, 2010	Canada	Fusion Camera System	1.85:1	89	Filmed in stereoscopic 3D.
Alpha and Omega	September 17, 2010	United States	Digital 3D	1.85:1	78	
The Hole	September 22, 2010 (UK) September 28, 2012 (USA)	United States	Red One Cameras and 3ality Technica 3D Rigs	1.85:1	92	Only in selected territories.
Legend of the Guardians: The Owls of Ga'Hoole	September 24, 2010	United States	Digital 3D	2.35:1	97	Also released in IMAX 3D, Dolby 3D, and 4DX.
Animals United	October 7, 2010	Germany	Digital 3D	2.35:1	93	
Dark World	October 7, 2010	Russia	100			
My Soul to Take	October 8, 2010	United States	Filmed in 2D	1.85:1	107	
The Child's Eye	October 14, 2010	Hong Kong	Red One Cameras	1.85:1	97	First Hong Kong 3D film.
The Olsen Gang Gets Polished	October 14, 2010	Denmark		1.85:1	75	
Don Quixote	October 15, 2010 (China) October 28, 2010 (Hong Kong)	China Hong Kong		2.35:1	106	First Chinese 3D film.
Jackass 3D	October 15, 2010	United States	Red One Cameras and Paradise FX 3D	1.85:1	94	3D conversion by Stereo D. Also released in Dolby 3D and 4DX. The first MTV film to be presented and released in stereoscopic 3D.
Saw 3D	October 29, 2010	United States	Silicon Imaging 3D and 3ality Technica Neutron 3D Rigs	1.85:1	90	Also released in Dolby 3D and 4DX.
Winx Club 3D: Magical Adventure	October 29, 2010	Italy	Digital 3D	2.35:1	87	First Italian 3D film.
The Happets	October 29, 2010	Spain		1.85:1	76	
Garo: Red Requiem	October 30, 2010	Japan			97	
Amphibious	November 1, 2010	Indonesia Netherlands		1.85:1	83	
Megamind	November 5, 2010	United States	Digital 3D	2.35:1	96	Also released in IMAX 3D, Dolby 3D, and 4DX.
Harry Potter and the Deathly Hallows – Part 1	November 19, 2010	United States	Filmed in 2D	2.39:1	146	3D conversion by Prime Focus. Warner Bros. Pictures was originally going to release Part 1 of Deathly Hallows in 2D and 3D formats. On 8 October 2010, it was announced that plans for a 3D version of Part 1 had been cancelled. "Warner Bros. Pictures has made the decision to release Harry Potter and the Deathly Hallows – Part 1 in 2D, in both conventional and IMAX theaters because we will not have a completed 3D version of the film within our release date window. Despite everyone's best efforts, we were unable to convert the film in its entirety and meet the highest standards of quality." Part 1 of Deathly Hallows was released on Blu-ray 3D as a Best Buy Exclusive. Part 2 was instead released in 2D, 3D, and IMAX formats.
Battle Royale	November 20, 2010	Japan	Filmed in 2D	1.85:1	114	Originally released in 2D in 2000.
Moby Dick	November 23, 2010	United States		1.78:1	85	
The Nutcracker in 3D	November 24, 2010	United States United Kingdom	Filmed in 2D	2.35:1	110	
Tangled	November 24, 2010	United States	Digital 3D	1.85:1	100	Also released in IMAX 3D, Dolby 3D, and 4DX.
Shrek	December 1, 2010	United States	Rendered in 2D	1.85:1	90	Originally released in 2D in 2001, converted from 2D to 3D during post-production for re-release.
Shrek 2	December 1, 2010	United States	Rendered in 2D	1.85:1	92	Originally released in 2D in 2004, converted from 2D to 3D during post-production for re-release.
Shrek the Third	December 1, 2010	United States	Rendered in 2D	1.85:1	92	Originally released in 2D in 2007, converted from 2D to 3D during post-production for re-release.
The Chronicles of Narnia: The Voyage of the Dawn Treader	December 10, 2010	United States	Filmed in 2D	2.35:1	113	3D conversion by Prime Focus. Also released in Dolby 3D and 4DX.
Tron: Legacy	December 17, 2010	United States	Fusion Camera System	2.35:1	126	Also released in IMAX 3D, Dolby 3D, and 4DX.
Yogi Bear	December 17, 2010	United States	Fusion Camera System	1.85:1	80	Also released in Dolby 3D and 4DX.
Toonpur Ka Superrhero	December 24, 2010	India		2.35:1	95	
Gulliver's Travels	December 25, 2010	United States	Filmed in 2D	2.35:1	85	Also released in Dolby 3D and 4DX. 3D conversion by Stereo D.
RPG Metanoia	December 25, 2010	Philippines	Digital 3D	1.78:1	105	

==== 2011 ====
Title	Release date	Prod. country	Camera system	Aspect ratio	Runtime min	Notes
Daybreakers	November 3, 2011	Germany	Filmed in 2D	2.39:1	98	3D conversion of the 2009 film.
Immortal	August 26, 2011	France	Filmed in 2D	2.39:1	102	3D conversion of the 2004 film.
The Green Hornet	January 14, 2011	United States	Filmed in 2D	2.39:1	119	3D conversion by Stereo D. Also released in IMAX 3D, Dolby 3D and 4DX.
The Best Movie 3-De	January 20, 2011	Russia			97	
Brasil Animado	January 21, 2011	Brazil			78	
Sanctum	February 5, 2011	United States	Fusion Camera System	1.85:1	109	Also released in IMAX 3D, Dolby 3D, and 4DX.
Fimfarum: The Third Time Lucky 3D	February 10, 2011	Czech Republic		1.85:1	75	
Gnomeo & Juliet	February 11, 2011	United States	Digital 3D	1.85:1	84	
Justin Bieber: Never Say Never	February 11, 2011	United States	Fusion Camera System	1.85:1	105	Also released in Dolby 3D and 4DX.
Pina	February 13, 2011	Germany		1.85:1	106	
Drive Angry	February 25, 2011	United States	Red One Cameras and Paradise FX 3D	1.85:1	104	Also released in Dolby 3D and 4DX.
Torrente 4: Lethal Crisis	March 9, 2011	Spain	3ality Technica 3D Rigs	1.85:1	93	
Mars Needs Moms	March 11, 2011	United States	Digital 3D	2.39:1	88	Also released in IMAX 3D, Dolby 3D, and 4DX.
Ghost in the Shell: Stand Alone Complex – Solid State Society	March 26, 2011	Japan	Filmed in 2D	1.78:1	109	The 2006 film is re-rendered in 3D.
Titeuf	April 6, 2011	France			87	
Born to Be Wild 3D	April 8, 2011	United States	Dual 70mm and dual HD	1.43:1	41	The first film to use the IMAX Digital 3D cameras.
3D Sex and Zen: Extreme Ecstasy	April 14, 2011	Hong Kong		2.35:1	128	
Rio	April 15, 2011	United States	Digital 3D	2.39:1	96	Also released in Dolby 3D and 4DX.
TT3D: Closer to the Edge	April 22, 2011	United Kingdom		1.85:1	104	Partially 3D; footage including racing sequences filmed flat, then converted from 2D to 3D for technical reasons.
Deep Gold	April 22, 2011	Philippines		1.78:1	86	
Little Ghostly Adventures of Tofu Boy	April 26, 2011	Japan		1.85:1	86	
Hoodwinked Too! Hood vs. Evil	April 29, 2011	United States	Rendered in 2D	1.85:1	87	
Thor	May 6, 2011	United States	Filmed in 2D	2.35:1	114	3D conversion by Stereo D. Also released in IMAX 3D, Dolby 3D, and 4DX. The first Marvel Studios film to be presented and released in stereoscopic 3D.
Haunted – 3D	May 6, 2011	India	Filmed in 3D	2.35:1	143	3D conversion by EFX Prasad Labs.
Flying Monsters 3D	May 6, 2011	United Kingdom		1.78:1	39	
Priest	May 13, 2011	United States	Filmed in 2D	2.39:1	87	Also released in Dolby 3D and 4DX.
Pirates of the Caribbean: On Stranger Tides	May 20, 2011	United States	Fusion Camera System	2.39:1	137	Also released in IMAX 3D, Dolby 3D, and 4DX.
Kung Fu Panda 2	May 26, 2011	United States	Digital 3D	2.35:1	90	Also released in IMAX 3D, Dolby 3D, and 4DX.
Freddy Frogface	June 1, 2011	Denmark			78	
The Lion of Judah	June 3, 2011	United States	Rendered in 2D	1.85:1	87	
The Prodigies	June 8, 2011	France Belgium; United Kingdom	Rendered in 2D		85	
The Magical Duvet	June 16, 2011	Czech Republic		1.85:1	103	
Green Lantern	June 17, 2011	United States	Filmed in 2D	2.39:1	114	3D conversion by Legend3D and Prime Focus. Also released in Dolby 3D and 4DX.
Rescue 3D	June 17, 2011	Canada	Dual 70mm and dual HD	1.43:1	45	
Kylie 3D: Aphrodite Les Folies	June 19, 2011	United Kingdom			121	
Cars 2	June 24, 2011	United States	Digital 3D	2.39:1	106	Also released in IMAX 3D, Dolby 3D, and 4DX.
Transformers: Dark of the Moon	June 29, 2011	United States	Fusion Camera System	2.39:1	154	Also released in IMAX 3D, Dolby 3D, and 4DX. 3D conversion by Legend3D and Prime Focus. Half of the film was filmed in 2D and converted from 2D to 3D during post-production.
Derrière les murs	July 6, 2011	France	Filmed in 3D	1.85:1	90	
Legend of a Rabbit	July 11, 2011	China			89	
Harry Potter and the Deathly Hallows – Part 2	July 15, 2011	United States	Filmed in 2D	2.39:1	130	3D conversion by Prime Focus. Also released in IMAX 3D, Dolby 3D, and 4DX.
Tales of the Night	July 20, 2011	France	Digital 3D	1.78:1	84	
Captain America: The First Avenger	July 22, 2011	United States	Filmed in 2D	2.35:1	123	Also released in Dolby 3D and 4DX. 3D conversion by Stereo D.
Tekken: Blood Vengeance	July 26, 2011	Japan	Digital 3D	1.85:1	92	Dubbed into English and released in select US theaters on July 26, 2011.
The Smurfs	July 29, 2011	United States	Filmed in 2D	1.85:1	103	Also released in Dolby 3D and 4DX. 3D conversion by Legend3D.
Horrid Henry: The Movie	July 29, 2011	United Kingdom		1.85:1	93	
Jock the Hero Dog	July 29, 2011	South Africa United States	Digital 3D	1.78:1	89	
Sector 7	August 4, 2011	South Korea	Filmed in 2D	1.85:1	104	
Final Destination 5	August 12, 2011	United States	Fusion Camera System	2.39:1	95	Also released in IMAX 3D, Dolby 3D, and 4DX.
Glee: The 3D Concert Movie	August 12, 2011	United States	Fusion Camera System	1.85:1	84	Also released in Dolby 3D and 4DX.
Tormented	August 17, 2011	Japan	1.85:1	83		
Conan the Barbarian	August 19, 2011	United States	Filmed in 2D	2.39:1	113	Also released in Dolby 3D and 4DX. 3D conversion by Legend3D and Gener8.
Jogayya	August 19, 2011	India		2.35:1	136	
Fright Night	August 19, 2011	United States	Red One Cameras and Paradise FX 3D	1.85:1	106	Also released in Dolby 3D and 4DX. The first DreamWorks Pictures film to be presented and released in stereoscopic 3D.
Spy Kids: All the Time in the World	August 19, 2011	United States	Fusion Camera System	1.85:1	88	Also released in Dolby 3D and 4DX.
A Haunting in Salem	August 23, 2011	United States	Red One Cameras	1.78:1	86	
Deep Gold	August 31, 2011	Philippines	Filmed in 2D	1.85:1	86	
Shark Night 3D	September 2, 2011	United States	Fusion Camera System	1.85:1	91	
The Art of Flight	September 8, 2011	United States		16:9	80	
Mayday 3DNA	September 15, 2011	Taiwan China		1.85:1	96	
Top Cat: The Movie	September 16, 2011	Mexico Argentina	Rendered in 2D	1.78:1	90	
The Lion King	September 16, 2011	United States	Filmed in 2D	1.85:1	90	Originally released in 2D in 1994.
Dolphin Tale	September 23, 2011	United States	Red One Cameras and Paradise FX 3D	1.85:1	113	Also released in Dolby 3D and 4DX.
Battle of Warsaw 1920	September 23, 2011	Poland	Fusion Camera System	1.85:1	115	
The Sorcerer and the White Snake	September 28, 2011 (China); September 29, 2011 (Hong Kong)	China Hong Kong	Filmed in 2D	2.35:1	102	Also titled Emperor And The White Snake
Vicky and the Treasure of the Gods	September 29, 2011	Germany	Filmed in 2D	2.35:1	96	
Ronal the Barbarian	September 29, 2011	Denmark	Digital 3D	2.35:1	89	
SeeFood	October 7, 2011	Malaysia			93	
A Monster in Paris	October 12, 2011	France	Digital 3D	1.85:1	90	
Laura's Star and the Dream Monster	October 13, 2011	Germany	Rendered in 2D	1.78:1	65	
Legends of Valhalla: Thor	October 14, 2011	Iceland		2.35:1	79	
El gran milagro	October 14, 2011	Mexico		2.35:1	70	
Hara-Kiri: Death of a Samurai	October 15, 2011	Japan	Digital 3D	2.35:1	128	
The Missing Lynx	August 20, 2011	Spain	Filmed in 2D	2.35:1	80	
The Three Musketeers	October 21, 2011	United States	Fusion Camera System	2.35:1	110	Also released in Dolby 3D and 4DX.
Ra.One	October 24, 2011	India	Filmed in 2D	2.35:1	154	3D conversion by Prime Focus.
The Adventures of Tintin	October 26, 2011	United States	Digital 3D	2.35:1	106	Also released in IMAX 3D, Dolby 3D, and 4DX.
Puss in Boots	October 28, 2011	United States	Digital 3D	2.35:1	90	Also released in IMAX 3D, Dolby 3D, and 4DX.
The Magic Crystal	November 2, 2011	Finland Belgium			80	
Sleepwalker	November 3, 2011	Hong Kong		1.85:1	105	
A Very Harold & Kumar 3D Christmas	November 4, 2011	United States	Panavision Genesis and 3ality Technica Quasar 3D Rigs	2.39:1	90	Also released in Dolby 3D and 4DX.
The Flying Machine	November 4, 2011	United Kingdom		1.85:1	123	
Immortals	November 11, 2011	United States	Panavision Genesis and 3ality Technica Quasar 3D Rigs are used for VFX shots and CGI effects	1.85:1	110	Also released in Dolby 3D and 4DX. 3D conversion by Prime Focus.
Shadowboxing 3: Last Round	November 17, 2011	Russia		2.35:1	125	
Happy Feet Two	November 18, 2011	Australia United States	Digital 3D	2.35:1	99	
Arthur Christmas	November 23, 2011	United Kingdom United States	Digital 3D	1.85:1	97	Also released in Dolby 3D and 4DX.
Hugo	November 23, 2011	United States	Fusion Camera System	1.85:1	126	Also released in Dolby 3D and 4DX. 3D conversion and design by Legend3D.
Nova Zembla	November 24, 2011	Netherlands	Red Epic Cameras and 3ality Technica 3D Rigs	2.35:1	108	
Vicky and the Treasure of the Gods	November 29, 2011	Germany	Arri Alexa and STEREOTEC 3D Midsize Rigs	2.35:1	96	
Friends: Mononoke Shima no Naki	December 17, 2011	Japan		1.85:1	87	
Flying Swords of Dragon Gate	December 18, 2011	China	STEREOTEC 3D Rigs	2.39:1	125	
The Darkest Hour	December 23, 2011	United States	Sony CineAlta and 3ality Technica 3D Rigs	2.35:1	90	Also released in Dolby 3D and 4DX. The first Regency Enterprises film to be presented and released in stereoscopic 3D.
Don 2	December 23, 2011	India	Filmed in 2D	2.39:1	146	
Inazuma Eleven GO: Kyūkyoku no Kizuna Gurifon	December 23, 2011	Japan			90	
Dam 999	November 25, 2011	India		2.39:1	108	
Paranormal Xperience 3D	December 28, 2011	Spain	Red One Cameras	1.85:1	90	

==== 2012 ====
Title	Release date	Prod. country	Camera system	Aspect ratio	Runtime min	Notes
Space Junk 3D	January 13, 2012	United States		1.33:1	38	
Koala Kid	January 12, 2012	South Korea United States			85	
Beauty and the Beast	January 13, 2012	United States	Filmed in 2D	1.85:1	92	Originally released in 2D in 1991.
Underworld: Awakening	January 20, 2012	United States	Red Epic Cameras and 3ality Technica Atom 3D Rigs	2.39:1	89	Also released in IMAX 3D and 4DX, with the entire film opened up to a 1.78:1 aspect ratio.
Always: Sunset on Third Street '64	January 21, 2012	Japan	Digital 3D	2.35:1	142	
Speckles: The Tarbosaurus	January 26, 2012	South Korea			90	
The Illusionauts (a.k.a. Freedom Force)	January 26, 2012	Peru United States			82	First Peruvian film in 3D.
Journey 2: The Mysterious Island	February 10, 2012	United States	Fusion Camera System	1.85:1	94	Also released in IMAX 3D and 4DX.
Star Wars: Episode I – The Phantom Menace	February 10, 2012	United States	Filmed in 2D	2.35:1	136	3D conversion by Industrial Light & Magic (ILM) and Prime Focus. Originally released in 2D in 1999.
Ghost Rider: Spirit of Vengeance	February 17, 2012	United States	Filmed in 2D	2.39:1	95	Also released in 4DX.
Ambuli	February 17, 2012	India		2.39:1	139	First Tamil 3D film.
Dune	February 28, 2012	Germany	Filmed in 2D	2.35:1	136	3D conversion of the 1984 film.
Dr. Seuss' The Lorax	March 2, 2012	United States	Digital 3D	1.85:1	87	Also released in IMAX 3D and 4DX.
Kac Wawa	March 2, 2012	Poland		2.35:1	93	
Feu: Crazy Horse Paris	March 5, 2012	France		1.85:1	90	
John Carter	March 9, 2012	United States	Panavision Panaflex and 3ality Technica 3D Rigs with back plates	2.39:1	132	3D conversion by Stereo D. Also released in IMAX 3D and 4DX.
Dark Flight	March 22, 2012	Thailand		1.78:1	105	
Ultraman Saga	March 24, 2012	Japan			90	
The Pirates! In an Adventure with Scientists!	March 28, 2012	United Kingdom United States	Digital 3D	2.35:1	88	Also released in 4DX.
Wrath of the Titans	March 30, 2012	United States	Filmed in 2D	1.85:1	99	3D conversion by Prime Focus. Also released in IMAX 3D and 4DX.
StreetDance 2	March 30, 2012	United Kingdom	Digital 3D	1.85:1	85	Also released in 4DX.
James Cameron's Titanic	April 4, 2012	United States	Filmed in 2D	2.35:1	194	3D conversion and design by Stereo D. Originally released in 2D in 1997; first winner of Academy Award for Best Picture to be converted to stereoscopic 3D. Also released in IMAX 3D and 4DX, with the entire film opened up to a 1.78:1 aspect ratio.
The Cabin in the Woods	April 13, 2012	United States	Filmed in 2D	2.40:1	95	
To the Arctic 3D	April 20, 2012	United States		1.78:1	40	Also released in IMAX 3D.
Marvel's The Avengers	May 4, 2012	United States	Filmed in 2D	1.85:1	143	3D conversion by Stereo D. Also released in IMAX 3D and 4DX.
Katariveera Surasundarangi	May 10, 2012	India	Filmed in Panasonic 3D Cameras	2.12:50	135	First Kannada 3D movie.
Dangerous Ishhq	May 11, 2012	India			130	
Sadako 3D	May 12, 2012	Japan		1.85:1	96	
Matthew Bourne's Swan Lake	May 15, 2012	United Kingdom		1.78:1	120	
Janosch: Komm, wir finden einen Schatz!	May 24, 2012	Germany			75	
Men in Black 3	May 25, 2012	United States	Filmed in 2D	1.85:1	106	3D conversion by Prime Focus. Also released in IMAX 3D and 4DX.
Piranha 3DD	June 1, 2012	United States	Paradise FX 3D	1.85:1	83	
Madagascar 3: Europe's Most Wanted	June 8, 2012	United States	Digital 3D	1.85:1	93	
Prometheus	June 8, 2012	United States	Red Epic Cameras and 3ality Technica Atom 3D Rigs	2.39:1	123	Also released in IMAX 3D and 4DX, with the entire film opened up to a 1.90:1 aspect ratio.
Brave	June 22, 2012	United States	Digital 3D	2.39:1	93	Also released in 4DX. Won Academy Award for Best Animated Feature.
Abraham Lincoln: Vampire Hunter	June 22, 2012	United States	Filmed in 2D	2.39:1	105	3D conversion by Stereo D. Also released in 4DX.
Painted Skin: The Resurrection	June 28, 2012	China	Digital 3D	2.35:1	131	
The Amazing Spider-Man	July 3, 2012	United States	Red Epic Cameras and 3ality Technica TS5 3D Rigs	2.39:1	136	3D conversion by Gener8 and Legend3D. Also released in IMAX 3D and 4DX, with 20 minutes of footage opened up to a 1.78:1 aspect ratio.
Adventures in Zambezia	July 5, 2012	South Africa	Digital 3D	1.85:1	83	
Katy Perry: Part of Me	July 5, 2012	United States	Red Epic Cameras and 3ality Technica TS5 3D Rigs	1.85:1	93	3D conversion by Stereo D. Also released in 4DX. Some 2D archival footage included. The first Imagine Entertainment film to be presented and released in stereoscopic 3D.
Eega	July 6, 2012	India	Fusion Camera System	2.35:1	133	
Ice Age: Continental Drift	July 13, 2012	United States	Digital 3D	2.39:1	88	
Cendrillon au Far West	July 25, 2012	France			81	
Step Up Revolution	July 27, 2012	United States	Red Epic Cameras and 3ality Technica TS5 3D Rigs	2.39:1	99	Also released in 4DX.
Echo Planet	August 2, 2012	Thailand			81	First Thai 3D film.
Nitro Circus: The Movie	August 8, 2012	United States	3ality Technica Atom 3D Rigs	1.78:1	91	
Adhisaya Ulagam	August 10, 2012	India	Digital 3D	2.35:1	95	
The Monkey King: Uproar in Heaven	August 13, 2012	China		1.78:1	93	Remake of the original 1961 animation.
Storm Surfers 3D	August 14, 2012	Australia	Filmed in 3D	1.78:1	95	
A Turtle's Tale 2: Sammy's Escape from Paradise	August 15, 2012	France Belgium	Digital 3D	2.39:1	92	
Secret of the Wings	August 16, 2012	United States	Digital 3D	1.78:1	92	Also released in 4DX.
ParaNorman	August 17, 2012	United States	Digital 3D	2.39:1	93	Also released in 4DX.
29 Februari	August 30, 2012	Malaysia			104	
Upside Down	August 31, 2012	Canada		2.35:1	103	
Tad: The Lost Explorer	August 31, 2012	Spain	Digital 3D	1.85:1	92	
Raaz 3D	August 31, 2012	India		2.35:1	140	
Bait 3D	September 5, 2012	Australia	Digital 3D	1.85:1	93	
Finding Nemo	September 14, 2012	United States	Re-rendered in 3D	1.85:1	100	Also released in 4DX. Originally released in 2D in 2003; re-rendered as a stereoscopic 3D version in Disney Digital 3-D.
Resident Evil: Retribution	September 14, 2012	United States	Red Epic Cameras and 3ality Technica Atom 3D Rigs	2.39:1	147	Also released in IMAX 3D and 4DX.
Due West: Our Sex Journey	September 20, 2012	Hong Kong	Red Epic Cameras	1.78:1	119	
Dredd	September 21, 2012	United States	Red One Cameras and Paradise FX 3D	2.39:1	95	Also released in 4DX.
Tai Chi 0	September 27, 2012	China	Filmed in 2D	2.35:1	99	
Hotel Transylvania	September 28, 2012	United States	Digital 3D	1.85:1	91	Also released in 4DX.
Frankenweenie	October 5, 2012	United States	Filmed in 2D	1.85:1	87	
Dead Before Dawn	October 11, 2012	Canada		1.85:1	88	
Rodencia y el Diente de la Princesa	October 11, 2012	Peru Argentina	Digital 3D		87	
Little Brother, Big Trouble: A Christmas Adventure	October 12, 2012	Finland	Digital 3D	1.85:1	79	
Bhoot Returns	October 12, 2012	India			85	
Asterix and Obelix: God Save Britannia	October 17, 2012	France	Digital 3D	2.35:1	110	
Gladiators of Rome	October 18, 2012	Italy	Digital 3D	2.35:1	95	
I, Robot	October 23, 2012	United States	Filmed in 2D	2.35:1	115	Originally released in 2D in 2004.
Goat Story 2	October 25, 2012	Czech Republic	Digital 3D	2.35:1	85	First Czech 3D film.
Tai Chi Hero	October 25, 2012	Hong Kong China	Filmed in 2D	2.35:1	102	
Measuring the World	October 25, 2012	Germany Austria	Digital 3D	1.85:1	119	
Silent Hill: Revelation 3D	October 26, 2012	United States France	Red Epic Cameras and 3ality Technica 3D Rigs	2.39:1	95	
009 Re:Cyborg	October 27, 2012	Japan	Digital 3D	1.85:1	103	
Wreck-It Ralph	November 2, 2012	United States	Digital 3D	2.39:1	101	Also released in 4DX.
A Liar's Autobiography: The Untrue Story of Monty Python's Graham Chapman	November 2, 2012	United Kingdom	Digital 3D	1.85:1	85	
The Last Unicorn	November 7, 2012	United States	Filmed in 2D		93	
War of the Worlds: Goliath	November 15, 2012	Malaysia	Filmed in 2D	1.85:1	82	
Rise of the Guardians	November 21, 2012	United States	Digital 3D	1.85:1	97	
Life of Pi	November 21, 2012	United States	Fusion Camera System	1.85:1	123	Also released in IMAX 3D and 4DX. 3D conversion by Stereo D and Reliance MediaWorks. The first stereoscopic 3D film to win an Academy Award for Best Director (Ang Lee); nominated for Academy Award for Best Picture.
3 A.M.	November 22, 2012	Thailand		1.85:1	96	
Saint Dracula 3D	November 23, 2012	United Arab Emirates	Red		80	
The Penguin King	November 24, 2012	United Kingdom			78	
Universal Soldier: Day of Reckoning	November 30, 2012	United States	Red Epic Cameras and 3ality Technica 3D Rigs	2.35:1	113	Also released in 4DX.
Dino Time	November 30, 2012	South Korea			86	
Apartment 1303 3D	December 6, 2012	United States		2.35:1	101	
Chinese Zodiac (CZ12)	December 12, 2012	China	Filmed in 2D	2.35:1	122	Also released in IMAX 3D in China.
The Hobbit: An Unexpected Journey	December 14, 2012	New Zealand	Red Epic Cameras and 3ality Technica TS5 3D Rigs	2.39:1	169	Also released in IMAX 3D and 4DX, with the entire film opened up to a 2.00:1 aspect ratio. Filmed at 48fps (HFR). The first Metro-Goldwyn-Mayer (MGM) film to be presented and released in stereoscopic 3D.
Monsters, Inc.	December 19, 2012	United States	Re-rendered in 3D	1.85:1	93	Also released in 4DX. Originally released in 2D in 2001; re-rendered as a stereoscopic 3D version in Disney Digital 3-D.
Nurse 3D	December 20, 2012	United States	Arri Alexa 3D	2.39:1	84	
The Guillotines	December 20, 2012	China Hong Kong	Digital 3D	2.35:1	112	
CZ12	December 20, 2012	Hong Kong China	Digital 3D	2.35:1	123	
Cirque du Soleil: Worlds Away	December 21, 2012	United States	Fusion Camera System	1.85:1	91	Also released in IMAX 3D and 4DX.
The Pee-Wee 3D: The Winter That Changed My Life	December 21, 2012	Canada			122	
Three Heroes on Distant Shores	December 27, 2012	Russia			71	
The Snow Queen	December 31, 2012	Russia	Rendered in 2D	2.35:1	80	

==== 2013 ====
Title	Release date	Prod. country	Camera system	Aspect ratio	Runtime min	Notes
Saving Santa	November 1, 2013	United States		1.78:1	83	
Clash of the Empires	February 8, 2013	United States		1.78:1	87	Also titled Lord of the Elves
Texas Chainsaw 3D	January 4, 2013	United States	Red Epic Cameras and Technica Atom 3D Rigs	2.39:1	92	
Knight Rusty	January 10, 2013	Germany			84	
Flashback Memories 3D	January 19, 2013	Japan				
Pororo, The Racing Adventure	January 23, 2013	South Korea China			78	
Hansel & Gretel: Witch Hunters	January 25, 2013	United States	50% filmed with STEREOTEC 3D Rigs and 50% filmed in 2D	2.39:1	88	3D rigs and on-set services by STEREOTEC 3D. 3D conversion by Stereo D. Also released in IMAX 3D and 4DX.
The Amazing Safari	January 28, 2013	Malaysia			98	
Pehchaan 3D (Identity)	February 1, 2013	India		1.85:1	108	First 3D Punjabi film.
Journey to the West: Conquering the Demons	February 7, 2013 (Hong Kong) February 10, 2013 (China)	China Hong Kong	Filmed in 2D	2.35:1	110	Also released in IMAX 3D in China.
The Forbidden Girl	February 7, 2013	Germany			99	
Otto the Rhino	February 7, 2013	Denmark		1.85:1	76	
ABCD: Any Body Can Dance	February 8, 2013	India	Red Epic Cameras and 3ality Technica TS5 3D Rigs		143	
Top Gun	February 8, 2013	United States	Filmed in 2D	2.39:1	110	3D conversion by Legend3D. Originally released in 2D in 1986. Also released in IMAX 3D.
Escape from Planet Earth	February 15, 2013	United States	Digital 3D	2.39:1	89	
Spiders 3D	February 8, 2013	United States	Silicon Imaging SI-2K (P+S Freestyle 3D Rigs)	1.78:1	89	Won Best Native 3D Feature Film at the Los Angeles 3D Film Festival in 2012.
Jack the Giant Slayer	March 1, 2013	United States	Red Epic Cameras and 3ality Technica TS5 3D Rigs	2.39:1	114	Also released in IMAX 3D and 4DX. 3D conversion by Gener8.
The Legend of Sarila	March 1, 2013	Canada			80	
Oz the Great and Powerful	March 8, 2013	United States	Red Epic Cameras and 3ality Technica Atom 3D Rigs	2.39:1	130	Black and White opening sequence printed with a 1.33:1 aspect ratio. Also released in IMAX 3D and 4DX.
Bola Kampung: The Movie	March 21, 2013	Malaysia			97	
The Croods	March 22, 2013	United States	Digital 3D	2.35:1	98	Also released in 4DX.
G.I. Joe: Retaliation	March 29, 2013	United States	Filmed in 2D	2.39:1	110	3D conversion by Stereo D. Also released in IMAX 3D and 4DX.
Vigilante 3D	April 5, 2013	Nepal	QubeMaster 3D 2K		105	First Nepal 3D film.
Jurassic Park	April 5, 2013	United States	Filmed in 2D	1.85:1	126	3D conversion and design by Stereo D. Originally released in 2D in 1993. Also released in IMAX 3D and 4DX.
Run	April 19, 2013	United States	Filmed in 2D	1.85:1	90	
Iron Man 3	May 3, 2013	United States	Filmed in 2D	2.39:1	131	3D conversion by Stereo D. Also released in IMAX 3D and 4DX.
All Stars	May 3, 2013	United Kingdom			106	
Transcendence	May 3, 2013	China		1.85:1		
Gingerclown	May 9, 2013	Hungary		2.35:1	83	
The Great Gatsby	May 10, 2013	United States Australia	Red Epic Cameras and 3ality Technica TS5 3D Rigs	2.39:1	143	Also released in 4DX. 3D conversion by Prime Focus.
Star Trek Into Darkness	May 15, 2013	United States	Filmed in 2D	2.39:1	132	3D conversion by Stereo D. Also released in IMAX 3D and 4DX.
Ivan the Incredible	May 15, 2013	Denmark			80	
Legendary	May 17, 2013	United Kingdom China		2.35:1	92	
Epic	May 24, 2013	United States	Digital 3D	2.39:1	102	Also released in 4DX.
Zapatlela 2	June 7, 2013	India			119	
Switch	June 9, 2013 (China) June 12, 2013 (Hong Kong)	China Hong Kong	Filmed in 2D	2.39:1	122	
Man of Steel	June 14, 2013	United States	Filmed in 2D	2.39:1	143	3D conversion by Gener8 and Legend3D. Also released in IMAX 3D and 4DX.
World War Z	June 21, 2013	United States	Filmed in 2D	2.39:1	116	3D conversion by Prime Focus. Also released in IMAX 3D and 4DX.
Monsters University	June 21, 2013	United States	Digital 3D	1.85:1	104	Also released in 4DX.
Despicable Me 2	July 3, 2013	United States	Digital 3D	1.85:1	98	Also released in IMAX 3D and 4DX.
Pacific Rim	July 12, 2013	United States	Filmed in 2D	1.85:1	132	3D conversion by Stereo D. Also released in IMAX 3D and 4DX.
Mr. Go	July 17, 2013 (South Korea) July 18, 2013 (China)	South Korea China		1.85:1	132	First South Korean film to be filmed in stereoscopic 3D.
Turbo	July 17, 2013	United States	Digital 3D	2.35:1	96	Also released in 4DX.
Metegol	July 18, 2013	Argentina	Digital 3D	2.35:1	107	
R.I.P.D.	July 19, 2013	United States	Filmed in 2D	2.35:1	96	3D conversion by Stereo D. Also released in 4DX.
The Wolverine	July 26, 2013	United States	Filmed in 2D	2.39:1	126	3D conversion by Stereo D. Also released in 4DX.
The Smurfs 2	July 31, 2013	United States	Filmed in 3D	1.85:1	105	3D conversion by Legend3D. Also released in 4DX.
Percy Jackson: Sea of Monsters	August 7, 2013	United States	Filmed in 2D	2.35:1	106	3D conversion by Stereo D. Also released in 4DX.
Planes	August 9, 2013	United States	Digital 3D	1.85:1	91	Also released in 4DX.
Zombie Holidays 3D	August 15, 2013	Russia			95	
One Direction: This Is Us	August 30, 2013	United States	Red Epic Cameras and 3ality Technica 3D Rigs	1.85:1	92	
Bloody Date 3D	August 30, 2013	Poland	Sony CineAlta F3 DQ 3D Rigs & AG-3DP1	1.85:1	87	
Sadako 3D 2	August 30, 2013	Japan		1.85:1	96	
Se Puder... Dirija!	August 30, 2013	Brazil		1.85:1	84	
Hidden Universe 3D	September 5, 2013	Australia		1.43:1	45	
Harlock: Space Pirate	September 7, 2013	Japan	Rendered in 2D	2.39:1	115	
Vikingdom	September 12, 2013	Malaysia United States		1.85:1	115	
Battle of the Year	September 13, 2013	United States	Sony CineAlta F3 Cameras and 3ality Technica TS5 3D Rigs	1.85:1	110	
Justin and the Knights of Valour	September 13, 2013	United Kingdom Spain		2.35:1	96	
Lost Place	September 19, 2013	Germany		2.35:1	101	
Jerusalem	September 20, 2013	United States	IMAX 3D	1.43:1	45	
The Wizard of Oz	September 20, 2013	United States	Filmed in 2D	1.37:1	101	Originally released in 2D in 1939. Re-released in IMAX 3D. 3D conversion by Prime Focus.
Rabbit Without Ears and Two-Eared Chick	September 26, 2013	Germany	Digital 3D	1.78:1	75	The German title is Keinohrhase und Zweiohrküken.
Cloudy with a Chance of Meatballs 2	September 27, 2013	United States	Digital 3D	2.39:1	95	Also released in 4DX.
Metallica: Through the Never	September 27, 2013	United States	Red Epic Cameras and 3ality Technica TS5 3D Rigs	2.39:1	94	Also released in IMAX 3D.
Young Detective Dee: Rise of the Sea Dragon	September 28, 2013	China	STEREOTEC 3D Rigs	2.39:1	133	Also released in IMAX 3D in China, with the entire film opened up to a 1.90:1 aspect ratio.
Out of Inferno	September 30, 2013 (China) October 3, 2013 (Hong Kong)	Hong Kong China		1.85:1	107	
Stalingrad	October 3, 2013	Russia	Red Epic Cameras and 3ality Technica TS5 3D Rigs	2.39:1	131	Also released in IMAX 3D in Russia, the Commonwealth of Independent States, and China.
Dracula 3D	October 4, 2013	Italy France; Spain		2.35:1	110	
Gravity	October 4, 2013	United States	Filmed in 2D	2.39:1	90	Also released in IMAX 3D and 4DX. 3D conversion by Prime Focus.
The Young and Prodigious T.S. Spivet	October 16, 2013	France Canada		2.39:1	105	Also released in IMAX 3D.
The Protector 2	October 23, 2013	Thailand		2.35:1	104	
Khumba	October 25, 2013	South Africa	Digital 3D	2.39:1	85	
Cars	October 29, 2013	United States		2.39:1	111	Originally released in 2D in 2006. Re-rendered in 3D for Blu-ray release.
Free Birds	November 1, 2013	United States	Digital 3D	1.85:1	91	
Thor: The Dark World	November 8, 2013	United States	Filmed in 2D	2.39:1	112	3D conversion by Stereo D. Also released in IMAX 3D.
Frozen	November 27, 2013	United States	Digital 3D	2.39:1	102	Also released in 4DX. Won Academy Award for Best Animated Feature.
Amazonia	November 27, 2013	France Brazil			83	
The Four II	December 6, 2013	China Hong Kong	Filmed in 2D	2.39:1	118	
Tarzan	December 12, 2013	Germany United States			94	
The Hobbit: The Desolation of Smaug	December 13, 2013	New Zealand	Red Epic Cameras and 3ality Techinca TS5 3D Rigs	2.39:1	161	Also released in IMAX 3D and 4DX, with the entire film opened up to a 2.00:1 aspect ratio for IMAX 70mm presentations. Filmed at 48fps (HFR).
Predator	December 17, 2013	United States	Filmed in 2D	1.78:1	107	
Firestorm	December 19, 2013	Hong Kong		2.35:1	118	Also released in IMAX 3D in China.
Walking with Dinosaurs	December 20, 2013	United States	Fusion Camera System	2.39:1	87	Also released in 4DX.
Police Story 2013	December 24, 2013	China Hong Kong		2.35:1	108	Also released in IMAX 3D in China.
47 Ronin	December 25, 2013	United States	Fusion Camera System	2.39:1	118	Also released in IMAX 3D and 4DX.
The House of Magic	December 25, 2013	Belgium France	Digital 3D	1.85:1	85	
Mahabharat	December 27, 2013	India			125	
The Frog Kingdom	December 28, 2013	China			86	

==== 2014 ====
Title	Release date	Prod. country	Camera system	Aspect ratio	Runtime min	Notes
The Legend of Hercules	January 10, 2014	United States	Red Epic Cameras and 3ality Technica Atom 3D Rigs	2.39:1	99	Also released in 4DX.
Hype Nation 3D	January 16, 2014	United States South Korea	Red One Cameras and STEREOTEC 3D Live Rigs		84	
The Nut Job	January 17, 2014	United States	Digital 3D	1.85:1	86	
I, Frankenstein	January 24, 2014	United States	Filmed in 2D	2.39:1	92	Also released in IMAX 3D and 4DX, with the entire film opened up to a 1.90:1 aspect ratio.
Minuscule: Valley of the Lost Ants	January 29, 2014	France Belgium	Filmed in 2D	2.35:1	89	
The Monkey King	January 30, 2014 (Hong Kong) January 31, 2014 (China)	Hong Kong China		2.39:1	120	
Viy 3D	January 30, 2014	Russia China; Ukraine; Germany; Czech Republic	Arri Alexa and STEREOTEC 3D Midsize Rigs	1.85:1	146	
The Lego Movie	February 7, 2014	United States	Digital 3D	2.39:1	100	Live-action sequence of 3D conversion by Legend3D. Also released in 4DX.
RoboCop	February 12, 2014	United States	Filmed in 2D	2.39:1	118	Only in China.
Pompeii	February 21, 2014	United States	Red Epic Cameras and 3ality Technica Atom 3D Rigs	2.39:1	105	Also released in 4DX. The first TriStar Pictures film to be presented and released in stereoscopic 3D.
300: Rise of an Empire	March 7, 2014	United States	Filmed in 2D	2.39:1	102	3D conversion by Gener8. Also released in IMAX 3D and 4DX.
Mr. Peabody & Sherman	March 7, 2014	United States	Digital 3D	1.85:1	92	Also released in 4DX.
Need for Speed	March 14, 2014	United States	Filmed in 2D	2.39:1	130	3D conversion by Stereo D. Also released in IMAX 3D and 4DX in selected territories.
Beyond Beyond	March 21, 2014	Sweden		2.35:1	78	
Noah	March 26, 2014	United States	Filmed in 2D	1.85:1	132	3D conversion by Stereo D. Also released in IMAX 3D and 4DX in selected territories.
Naked Ambition 2	April 3, 2014	Hong Kong	Digital 3D	2.39:1	107	
Captain America: The Winter Soldier	April 4, 2014	United States	Filmed in 2D	2.39:1	136	3D conversion by Stereo D. Also released in IMAX 3D and 4DX.
Island of Lemurs: Madagascar	April 4, 2014	United States			39	Also released in IMAX 3D.
Rio 2	April 11, 2014	United States	Digital 3D	2.39:1	101	Also released in 4DX.
Make Your Move	April 17, 2014	South Korea United States	Digital 3D	1.85:1	110	
Transcendence	April 18, 2014	United States	Filmed in 2D	2.39:1	119	3D conversion by Stereo D. Also released in IMAX 3D in China.
Iceman	April 25, 2014	Hong Kong China	Filmed in 2D	2.39:1	104 (Hong Kong) 91 (China)	
The Amazing Spider-Man 2	May 2, 2014	United States	Filmed in 2D	2.39:1	142	3D conversion by Legend3D. Also released in IMAX 3D and 4DX.
Legends of Oz: Dorothy's Return	May 9, 2014	United States	Digital 3D	1.78:1	87	Also released in 4DX.
Godzilla	May 16, 2014	United States	Filmed in 2D	2.39:1	123	3D conversion by Stereo D. Also released in IMAX 3D and 4DX.
X-Men: Days of Future Past	May 23, 2014	United States	Arri Alexa and 3ality Technica TS5 3D Rigs	2.39:1	131	3D conversion by Stereo D. Also released in IMAX 3D and 4DX.
Goodbye to Language	May 28, 2014	France Switzerland		1.78:1	69	
Under the Electric Sky	May 29, 2014	United States			85	
Maleficent	May 30, 2014	United States	Filmed in 2D	2.39:1	97	3D conversion by Gener8, Legend3D, and Prime Focus. Also released in IMAX 3D and 4DX.
Edge of Tomorrow	June 6, 2014	United States	Filmed in 2D	2.39:1	113	3D conversion by Prime Focus. Also released in IMAX 3D and 4DX.
How to Train Your Dragon 2	June 13, 2014	United States	Digital 3D	2.35:1	102	Also released in IMAX 3D and 4DX.
Transformers: Age of Extinction	June 27, 2014	United States	Red Epic Dragon Cameras and 3ality Technica TS5 3D Rigs	2.39:1	165	Also released in IMAX 3D and 4DX. 3D conversion by Prime Focus and Legend3D. Scenes filmed with IMAX 3D cameras opened up to a 1.90:1 aspect ratio for IMAX 3D presentations.
Aztec Blood	July 4, 2014	United States	Ultra3D	16:9	82	
Dawn of the Planet of the Apes	July 11, 2014	United States	Arri Alexa and 3ality Technica TS5 3D Rigs	1.85:1	131	Also released in 4DX.
Planes: Fire & Rescue	July 18, 2014	United States	Digital 3D	2.39:1	84	Also released in 4DX.
The House That Never Dies	July 18, 2014	China		2.35:1	90	
Pizza	July 18, 2014	India	Filmed in 3D	2.40:1	107	3D conversion by Prime Focus, SkyWorks Studio, and RAYS 3D.
Hercules	July 25, 2014	United States	Filmed in 2D	2.39:1	98	3D conversion by Stereo D. Also released in IMAX 3D and 4DX.
Lucy	July 25, 2014	France	Filmed in 2D	2.39:1	89	Also released in IMAX 3D. Only in China.
Dragon Nest: Warriors' Dawn	July 31, 2014	China	Rendered in 2D	1.85:1	88	
The White Haired Witch of Lunar Kingdom	July 31, 2014	China	Filmed in 2D	2.39:1	103	Also released in IMAX 3D in China.
Guardians of the Galaxy	August 1, 2014	United States	Filmed in 2D	2.39:1	122	3D conversion by Stereo D and Prime Focus. Also released in IMAX 3D and 4DX, with select scenes opened up to a 1.90:1 aspect ratio.
Step Up: All In	August 8, 2014	United States	Fusion Camera System	1.85:1	112	Also released in 4DX.
Teenage Mutant Ninja Turtles	August 8, 2014	United States	Filmed in 2D	2.39:1	101	3D conversion by Prime Focus and Stereo D. Also released in IMAX 3D and 4DX.
Stand by Me Doraemon	August 8, 2014	Japan	Digital 3D	1.85:1	95	
Darker than Night	August 14, 2014	Mexico	Digital 3D	1.85:1	110	First Mexican 3D film.
Shockwave, Darkside	August 21, 2014	United States	Digital 3D	1.85:1	92	
The Four III	August 22, 2014	China Hong Kong	Filmed in 2D	2.35:1	107	
Sin City: A Dame to Kill For	August 22, 2014	United States	Arri Alexa 3D	1.85:1	102	
Ap Bokto	September 1, 2014	Bhutan			53	First fully 3D film in Bhutan.
Ribbit	September 4, 2014	Malaysia			88	
Creature 3D	September 12, 2014	India			134	
The Seventh Dwarf	September 25, 2014	Germany	Digital 3D	1.85:1	87	
The Boxtrolls	September 26, 2014	United States	Digital 3D	1.85:1	96	
Black & White: The Dawn of Justice	October 1, 2014	China Taiwan	Filmed in 2D	2.39:1	126	
The Hero of Color City	October 3, 2014	United States			77	
The Frogville	October 3, 2014	Taiwan	Digital 3D	1.78:1	85	
Bugs	October 10, 2014	China		2.35:1	82	
The Book of Life	October 17, 2014	United States	Digital 3D	2.39:1	95	Also released in 4DX.
Mumbai 125 KM	October 17, 2014	India	Digital 3D	2.35:1	99	
Ouija	October 24, 2014	United States	Digital 3D	2.35:1	89	Also released in 4DX.
Maya the Bee	November 1, 2014	Australia	Digital 3D	1.85:1	87	
Yellowbird	November 6, 2014	France Belgium			90	
Chaar Sahibzaade	November 6, 2014	India	Digital 3D		128	
Big Hero 6	November 7, 2014	United States	Digital 3D	2.39:1	102	Won Academy Award for Best Animated Feature. Also released in IMAX 3D and 4DX.
The Hunger Games: Mockingjay – Part 1	November 21, 2014	United States	Filmed in 2D	2.39:1	123	Only in China.
Rise of the Legend	November 21, 2014 (China) November 27, 2014 (Hong Kong)	Hong Kong China	Filmed in 2D	2.39:1	131	
Penguins of Madagascar	November 26, 2014	United States	Digital 3D	1.85:1	92	Also released in IMAX 3D and 4DX in selected territories.
Asterix: The Mansions of the Gods	November 26, 2014	France Belgium	Digital 3D	1.85:1	85	
Mortadelo and Filemon: Mission Implausible	November 28, 2014	Spain	Digital 3D	1.85:1	91	
The Crossing	December 2, 2014 (Part 1) July 30, 2015 (Part 2)	China Hong Kong	Filmed in 2D	2.39:1	128 (Part 1) 131 (Part 2)	Also released in IMAX 3D in China for part 1 only.
Exodus: Gods and Kings	December 12, 2014	United States	Red Epic Dragon Cameras and 3ality Technica TS5 3D Rigs	2.39:1	150	3D conversion by Stereo D. Also released in IMAX 3D and 4DX.
The Hobbit: The Battle of the Five Armies	December 17, 2014	New Zealand	Red Epic Dragon Cameras and 3ality Technica TS5 3D Rigs	2.39:1	144	Also released in IMAX 3D and 4DX, with the entire film opened up to a 2.00:1 aspect ratio. Filmed at 48fps (HFR).
Gone with the Bullets	December 18, 2014	China		2.39:1	140	Also released in IMAX 3D in China.
The Taking of Tiger Mountain	December 24, 2014	China Hong Kong		1.85:1	141	

==== 2015 ====
Title	Release date	Prod. country	Camera system	Aspect ratio	Runtime min	Notes
Taken 3	January 9, 2015	France	Filmed in 2D	2.39:1	109	Also released in IMAX 3D. Only in China.
Paper Planes	January 15, 2015	Australia	Filmed in 2D	2.35:1	96	
Outcast	February 6, 2015	United States	Filmed in 2D	2.35:1	99	Only in China.
Seventh Son	February 6, 2015	United States	Filmed in 2D	2.39:1	105	3D conversion by Stereo D. Also released in IMAX 3D and 4DX, with the opening sequence opened up to a 1.90:1 aspect ratio.
Jupiter Ascending	February 6, 2015	United States	Filmed in 2D	2.39:1	127	3D conversion by Gener8 and Legend3D. Also released in IMAX 3D and 4DX.
The SpongeBob Movie: Sponge Out of Water	February 6, 2015	United States	Filmed in 3D	1.85:1	93	Also released in 4DX. 3D conversion by Stereo D.
Wolf Totem	February 13, 2015 (China) February 25, 2015 (France)	China France	Filmed in 3D	2.39:1	121	Also released in IMAX 3D in selected territories.
Yellowbird	February 18, 2015	France	Digital 3D	1.85:1	90	
Dragon Blade	February 19, 2015	China Hong Kong	Filmed in 2D	2.39:1	127	Also released in IMAX 3D in China.
From Vegas to Macau II	February 19, 2015	Hong Kong China	Filmed in 2D	2.39:1	110	
Zhong Kui: Snow Girl and the Dark Crystal	February 19, 2015	China Hong Kong; United States		2.39:1	118	
The Divergent Series: Insurgent	March 20, 2015	United States	Filmed in 2D	2.39:1	119	Also released in IMAX 3D.
Home	March 27, 2015	United States	Digital 3D	1.85:1	94	Also released in 4DX.
Jean-Michel Cousteau's Secret Ocean 3D	March 31, 2015	United States			40	Also released in IMAX 3D.
Every Thing Will Be Fine	April 2, 2015	Germany		2.35:1	118	
Star Wars: Episode II – Attack of the Clones	April 17, 2015	United States	Filmed in 2D	2.35:1	136	3D conversion by Industrial Light & Magic (ILM) and Prime Focus. Originally released in 2D in 2002.
Star Wars: Episode III – Revenge of the Sith	April 17, 2015	United States	Filmed in 2D	2.35:1	136	3D conversion by Industrial Light & Magic (ILM) and Prime Focus. Originally released in 2D in 2005.
Wolf Warrior	April 2, 2015	China	Filmed in 2D	2.39:1	90	
Furious 7	April 3, 2015	United States	Filmed in 2D	2.39:1	140	3D conversion by Stereo D. Also released in IMAX 3D and 4DX.
Animal Kingdom: Let's Go Ape	April 8, 2015	France		1.85:1	101	
Ooops! Noah Is Gone...	April 9, 2015	Germany	Digital 3D	1.85:1	87	
Guardians of Oz	April 10, 2015	Mexico India			86	
Mr. X	April 17, 2015	India			134	
Dragon Ball Z: Resurrection 'F'	April 18, 2015	Japan	Filmed in 2D	1.85:1	93	Also released in IMAX 3D in Japan.
Avengers: Age of Ultron	May 1, 2015	United States	Filmed in 2D	2.39:1	141	3D conversion by Stereo D and Prime Focus. Also released in IMAX 3D and 4DX.
Mad Max: Fury Road	May 15, 2015	Australia United States	Filmed in 2D	2.39:1	120	3D conversion by Stereo D. Also released in IMAX 3D and 4DX in selected territories.
Fighters 7	May 21, 2015	Malaysia	Filmed in 2D	2.39:1	140	
Poltergeist	May 22, 2015	United States	Filmed in 2D	2.39:1	93	3D conversion by Legend3D.
3 Bahadur	May 22, 2015	Pakistan			94	First Pakistani 3D film.
San Andreas	May 29, 2015	United States	Filmed in 2D	2.39:1	114	3D conversion by Stereo D. Also released in IMAX 3D and 4DX.
Lost in Wrestling	June 5, 2015	China Hong Kong		1.85:1	98	
Jurassic World	June 12, 2015	United States	Filmed in 2D	2.00:1	124	3D conversion by Stereo D. Also released in IMAX 3D and 4DX.
SPL II: A Time for Consequences	June 18, 2015	Hong Kong China	Filmed in 2D	2.39:1	120	
Inside Out	June 19, 2015	United States	Digital 3D	1.85:1	94	Won Academy Award for Best Animated Feature. Also released in IMAX 3D and 4DX.
ABCD 2	June 19, 2015	India			154	
Get Squirrely	June 20, 2015	United States			83	
Northern Limit Line	June 24, 2015	South Korea		2.39:1	130	
Terminator Genisys	July 1, 2015	United States	Filmed in 2D	2.39:1	126	3D conversion by Stereo D and Prime Focus. Also released in IMAX 3D and 4DX.
Monk Comes Down the Mountain	July 3, 2015	China	Filmed in 2D	2.39:1	123	Also released in IMAX 3D in China.
Baahubali: The Beginning	July 10, 2015	India		1.78:1	159	
Dear, Don't Be Afraid	July 10, 2015	China		2.35:1	88	
Minions	July 10, 2015	United States	Digital 3D	1.85:1	91	Also released in IMAX 3D and 4DX.
Love	July 15, 2015	France	Red Epic Dragon Cameras	2.39:1	135	
Monster Hunt	July 16, 2015	China Hong Kong	Filmed in 2D	2.39:1	118	Also released in IMAX 3D in China.
Ant-Man	July 17, 2015	United States	Filmed in 2D	1.85:1	117	3D conversion by Stereo D and Prime Focus. Also released in IMAX 3D and 4DX.
Aura Star: Attack of the Temple	July 23, 2015	China		2.39:1	92	
Pixels	July 24, 2015	United States	Filmed in 2D	2.39:1	105	3D conversion by Gener8 and Prime Focus. Also released in IMAX 3D and 4DX.
The Strange House	July 24, 2015	China		2.35:1	87	
The Little Prince	July 29, 2015	France		2.35:1	108	
Un Gallo Con Muchos Huevos	August 20, 2015	Mexico	Digital 3D	1.85:1	98	
Aikatsu! Music Award: Minna de Shō o MoraimaSHOW!	August 22, 2015	Japan				
Capture the Flag	August 25, 2015	Spain	Rendered in 2D	2.35:1	94	
Office	September 2, 2015 (China) September 24, 2015 (Hong Kong)	Hong Kong China	Filmed in 2D	2.39:1	117	
Blinky Bill: The Movie	September 17, 2015	Australia	Digital 3D	1.85:1	91	
Everest	September 18, 2015	United States	Filmed in 2D	2.39:1	121	3D conversion by Stereo D. Also released in IMAX 3D and 4DX.
Maze Runner: The Scorch Trials	September 18, 2015	United States	Filmed in 2D	2.39:1	131	3D conversion by Stereo D. Also released IMAX 3D and 4DX in selected territories.
Hotel Transylvania 2	September 25, 2015	United States	Digital 3D	1.85:1	89	Also released in 4DX.
The Mirror	September 25, 2015	China South Korea		2.39:1	101	
Chronicles of the Ghostly Tribe	September 30, 2015	China	Filmed in 2D	2.39:1	115	
The Martian	October 2, 2015	United States	Red Epic Dragon Cameras and 3ality Technica TS5 Rigs	2.39:1	141	3D conversion by Prime Focus. Also released in IMAX 3D and 4DX.
Pan	October 9, 2015	United States	Filmed in 2D	2.39:1	111	3D conversion by Gener8 and Prime Focus. Also released in 4DX.
The Walk	October 9, 2015	United States	Filmed in 2D	2.39:1	123	3D conversion by Legend3D. Also released in IMAX 3D and 4DX.
Rudhramadevi	October 9, 2015	India		1.78:1	157	First Telugu 3D film.
Air Bound	October 10, 2015	Japan	Digital 3D	2.35:1	92	
Mune: Guardian of the Moon	October 14, 2015	France	Rendered in 2D	2.39:1	86	
Goosebumps	October 16, 2015	United States	Filmed in 2D	2.39:1	103	Also released in 4DX. 3D conversion by Legend3D.
Paranormal Activity: The Ghost Dimension	October 23, 2015	United States	Filmed in 2D	1.85:1	88	
Where's the Dragon?	October 23, 2015	China Hong Kong		2.35:1	97	
Agent F.O.X.	October 30, 2015	China	Digital 3D	1.78:1	90	
Top Cat Begins	October 30, 2015	Mexico	Digital 3D	1.78:1	90	The Spanish title is Don Gato: El Inicio de la Pandilla.
The Peanuts Movie	November 6, 2015	United States	Digital 3D	1.85:1	93	Also released in 4DX.
A Warrior's Tail	November 12, 2015	Russia		2.39:1	85	
The Hunger Games: Mockingjay – Part 2	November 20, 2015	United States	Filmed in 2D	2.39:1	137	3D conversion by Gener8 and Legend3D. Also released in IMAX 3D and 4DX in selected territories.
The Good Dinosaur	November 25, 2015	United States	Digital 3D	2.39:1	100	Also released in 4DX.
He's a Dragon	December 3, 2015	Russia	Red Epic Cameras	2.35:1	110	
Impossible	December 4, 2015	China		2.35:1	99	
In the Heart of the Sea	December 11, 2015	United States	Filmed in 2D	1.85:1	122	3D conversion by Stereo D. Also released in IMAX 3D and 4DX.
Mojin: The Lost Legend	December 18, 2015	China		2.35:1	127	Also released in IMAX 3D in China, with select scenes opened up to a 1.90:1 aspect ratio.
Star Wars: The Force Awakens	December 18, 2015	United States	Filmed in 2D	2.39:1	135	3D conversion by Stereo D. Also released in IMAX 3D and 4DX, with select scenes opened up to 1.43:1 and 1.90:1 aspect ratios for IMAX Laser GT presentations.
Ip Man 3	December 24, 2015	Hong Kong	Filmed in 2D	2.35:1	105	
Point Break	December 25, 2015	United States	Filmed in 2D	2.39:1	113	3D conversion by Stereo D. Also released in IMAX 3D.

==== 2016 ====
Title	Release date	Prod. country	Camera system	Aspect ratio	Runtime min	Notes
Mafia: The Game of Survival	January 1, 2016	Russia			91	
Bogatyrsha	January 1, 2016	Russia			79	
El Americano: The Movie	January 22, 2016 (Mexico) June 13, 2017 (USA)	Mexico	Digital 3D	1.85:1	98	
Kung Fu Panda 3	January 29, 2016	United States	Digital 3D	2.35:1	95	Also released in IMAX 3D and 4DX in selected territories.
The Finest Hours	January 29, 2016	United States	Filmed in 2D	2.39:1	117	Also released in IMAX 3D and 4DX.
The Monkey King 2	February 6, 2016 (Hong Kong) February 8, 2016 (China)	Hong Kong China	Filmed in 3D	2.35:1	120	Also released in IMAX 3D in China.
The Mermaid	February 8, 2016	China	STEREOTEC 3D Rigs	2.35:1	94	
Toys in the Attic	February 12, 2016	Czech Republic	Filmed in 2D	2.35:1	78	
Quackerz	February 18, 2016	Russia China; Canada		1.78:1	81	
Crouching Tiger, Hidden Dragon: Sword of Destiny	February 19, 2016 (China) February 26, 2016 (USA)	United States China	Filmed in 2D	2.39:1	103	Also released in IMAX 3D and 4DX.
Gods of Egypt	February 26, 2016	United States	Filmed in 2D	2.39:1	127	Also released in IMAX 3D and 4DX. 3D conversion by Legend3D.
BoBoiBoy: The Movie	March 3, 2016	Malaysia	Digital 3D	2.39:1	90	
Zootopia	March 4, 2016	United States	Digital 3D	2.39:1	108	Won Academy Award for Best Animated Feature. Also released in IMAX 3D and 4DX.
The Divergent Series: Allegiant	March 18, 2016	United States	Filmed in 2D	2.39:1	121	Also released in IMAX 3D and 4DX in selected territories.
Batman v Superman: Dawn of Justice	March 25, 2016	United States	Filmed in 2D	2.39:1	151	3D conversion by Gener8. Also released in IMAX 3D and 4DX, with select scenes opened up to a 1.43:1 and 1.90:1 aspect ratios for IMAX Laser GT presentations.
Robinson Crusoe	March 30, 2016 (Belgium) April 20, 2016 (France)	Belgium France	Digital 3D	2.39:1	90	
The Jungle Book	April 15, 2016	United States	Fusion Camera System	1.85:1	106	Also released in IMAX 3D and 4DX.
Flight Crew	April 21, 2016	Russia		2.35:1	140	Also released in IMAX 3D in Russia and China.
The Huntsman: Winter's War	April 22, 2016	United States	Filmed in 2D	2.39:1	114	Only in selected territories.
Sheep and Wolves	April 28, 2016	Russia		2.35:1	85	
Ratchet & Clank	April 29, 2016	United States Canada	Rendered in 2D	2.39:1	94	
Phantom of the Theatre	April 29, 2016	China Hong Kong			104	
A Beautiful Planet	April 29, 2016	United States	Digital 3D	1.85:1	46	Also released in IMAX 3D.
Captain America: Civil War	May 6, 2016	United States	Filmed in 2D	2.39:1	147	3D conversion by Stereo D and Prime Focus. Also released in IMAX 3D and 4DX, with select scenes opened up to a 1.90:1 aspect ratio.
The Angry Birds Movie	May 20, 2016	United States Finland	Digital 3D	1.85:1	97	Also released in 4DX.
Alice Through the Looking Glass	May 27, 2016	United States	Filmed in 2D	1.85:1	113	3D conversion by Gener8, Legend3D, and Prime Focus. Also released in IMAX 3D and 4DX.
X-Men: Apocalypse	May 27, 2016	United States	Red Epic Dragon Cameras and 3ality Technica TS5 3D Rigs	2.39:1	144	3D conversion by Stereo D, Legend3D, and Prime Focus. Also released in IMAX 3D and 4DX.
Teenage Mutant Ninja Turtles: Out of the Shadows	June 3, 2016	United States	Filmed in 2D	2.39:1	112	3D conversion by Prime Focus. Also released in IMAX 3D and 4DX.
Warcraft	June 10, 2016	United States	Filmed in 2D	2.39:1	123	3D conversion by Prime Focus. Also released in IMAX 3D and 4DX.
Finding Dory	June 17, 2016	United States	Digital 3D	1.85:1	97	Also released in IMAX 3D and 4DX.
Independence Day: Resurgence	June 24, 2016	United States	Filmed in 2D	2.39:1	129	3D conversion by Legend3D and Stereo D. Also released in IMAX 3D and 4DX.
The BFG	July 1, 2016	United States	Filmed in 2D	2.39:1	117	3D conversion by Stereo D. Also released in IMAX 3D and 4DX.
The Legend of Tarzan	July 1, 2016	United States	Filmed in 2D	2.39:1	110	3D conversion by Prime Focus World. Also released in IMAX 3D and 4DX.
The Secret Life of Pets	July 8, 2016	United States	Digital 3D	1.85:1	98	Also released in IMAX 3D and 4DX.
Rock Dog	July 8, 2016	United States	Digital 3D	1.85:1	80	Only in China.
Cold War 2	July 8, 2016	Hong Kong China	Filmed in 2D	2.39:1	110	Also released in IMAX 3D in China and Taiwan.
Big Fish & Begonia	July 8, 2016	China	Digital 3D	2.35:1	105	
Ghostbusters	July 15, 2016	United States	Filmed in 2D	2.39:1	116	3D conversion by Legend3D and Gener8. Also released in IMAX 3D and 4DX, with the emotional "Into the Portal" scene presented in 1.43:1 and 1.90:1 aspect ratios for IMAX Laser GT presentations.
Ice Age: Collision Course	July 22, 2016	United States	Digital 3D	2.39:1	94	Also released in IMAX 3D and 4DX in selected territories.
Star Trek Beyond	July 22, 2016	United States	Filmed in 2D	2.39:1	120	3D conversion by Stereo D. Also released in IMAX 3D and 4DX.
Skiptrace	July 22, 2016	United States	Filmed in 2D	2.39:1	120	Also released in IMAX 3D in China.
Jason Bourne	July 29, 2016	United States	Filmed in 2D	2.39:1	123	3D conversion by Stereo D. Also released in IMAX 3D and 4DX in selected territories.
League of Gods	July 29, 2016	Hong Kong China	Filmed in 2D	2.39:1	109	3D conversion by Gener8. Also released in IMAX 3D in China.
Suicide Squad	August 5, 2016	United States	Filmed in 2D	2.39:1	123	3D conversion by Gener8. Also released in IMAX 3D and 4DX.
Time Raiders	August 5, 2016	China	Filmed in 2D	2.39:1	123	Also released in IMAX 3D in China.
Rudolf the Black Cat	August 6, 2016	Japan		1.78:1	90	Only in selected territories.
Pete's Dragon	August 12, 2016	United States	Filmed in 2D	2.39:1	102	
Call of Heroes	August 18, 2016	Hong Kong China	Filmed in 2D	2.35:1	120	
Ben-Hur	August 19, 2016	United States	Filmed in 2D	2.39:1	123	3D conversion by Legend3D. Also released in IMAX 3D and 4DX.
Kubo and the Two Strings	August 19, 2016	United States	Digital 3D	2.39:1	102	Also released in 4DX.
Throne of Elves	August 19, 2016	China		2.35:1	104	
One More Time with Feeling	September 8, 2016	United Kingdom			112	
Bilal: A New Breed of Hero	September 8, 2016	United Arab Emirates		2.35:1	105	First Emirati 3D film.
My War	September 15, 2016	China	Filmed in 2D	2.39:1	124	Also released in IMAX 3D in China.
Storks	September 23, 2016	United States	Digital 3D	2.39:1	92	Also released in IMAX 3D and 4DX.
The Duelist	September 29, 2016	Russia			110	
Miss Peregrine's Home for Peculiar Children	September 30, 2016	United States	Filmed in 2D	1.85:1	127	Also released in 4DX. 3D conversion by Stereo D.
L.O.R.D: Legend of Ravaging Dynasties	September 30, 2016	China		2.39:1	117	Also released in IMAX 3D in China.
Heartfall Arises	October 20, 2016 (Hong Kong) October 21, 2016 (China)	China Hong Kong	Filmed in 2D	2.39:1	108	
Doctor Strange	November 4, 2016	United States	Filmed in 2D	2.39:1	115	3D conversion by Legend3D and Stereo D. Also released in IMAX 3D and 4DX, with select scenes opened up to a 1.90:1 aspect ratio.
Trolls	November 4, 2016	United States	Digital 3D	2.35:1	93	Also released in 4DX.
Billy Lynn's Long Halftime Walk	November 11, 2016	United States	Sony CineAlta F65 with STEREOTEC 3D Lightweight Rigs	1.85:1	113	Filmed at 120FPS and 4K HDR resolution.
Fantastic Beasts and Where to Find Them	November 18, 2016	United States	Filmed in 2D	2.39:1	133	3D conversion by Legend3D, Prime Focus, and Stereo D. Also released in IMAX 3D and 4DX, enhanced framing technique known as "Frame-Break" used to enhance 3D effects, making effects travel "outside" the frame.
The Warriors Gate	November 18, 2016	China France	Filmed in 2D	2.39:1	108	
Moana	November 23, 2016	United States	Digital 3D	2.39:1	103	Also released in 4DX
Sword Master	December 2, 2016	China		1.85:1	108	
Ballerina	December 14, 2016	France Canada	Digital 3D	2.35:1	89	
The Great Wall	December 15, 2016 (China) February 17, 2017 (USA)	United States China	Filmed in 2D	2.39:1	104	3D conversion by Stereo D. Also released in IMAX 3D and 4DX.
3 Bahadur: The Revenge of Baba Balaam	December 15, 2016	Pakistan			107	
Rogue One: A Star Wars Story	December 16, 2016	United States	Filmed in 2D	2.39:1	133	3D conversion by Stereo D. Also released in IMAX 3D and 4DX.
Assassin's Creed	December 21, 2016	United States	Filmed in 2D	2.39:1	115	3D conversion by Stereo D. Also released in IMAX 3D and 4DX.
Passengers	December 21, 2016	United States	Filmed in 2D	2.39:1	116	Also released in 4DX.
Sing	December 21, 2016	United States	Digital 3D	1.85:1	110	Also released in IMAX 3D and 4DX.

==== 2017 ====
Title	Release date	Prod. country	Camera system	Aspect ratio	Runtime min	Notes
Underworld: Blood Wars	January 6, 2017	United States	Filmed in 2D	2.39:1	91	Also released in 4DX. 3D conversion by Legend3D.
Monster Trucks	January 13, 2017	United States	Filmed in 2D	2.39:1	104	Also released in 4DX. 3D conversion by Prime Focus, Legend3D, and Stereo D.
Knight Rusty 2: Full Metal Racket	January 19, 2017	Germany			87	
xXx: Return of Xander Cage	January 20, 2017	United States	Filmed in 2D	2.39:1	107	3D conversion by Stereo D. Also released in IMAX 3D.
Attraction	January 26, 2017	Russia	Filmed in 2D	2.39:1	130	Also released in IMAX 3D in Russia and the CIS.
Resident Evil: The Final Chapter	January 27, 2017	United States	Filmed in 2D	2.39:1	106	3D conversion by Legend3D. Also released in IMAX 3D and 4DX.
Journey to the West: The Demons Strike Back	January 28, 2017	China		1.85:1	108	Also released in IMAX 3D in China.
The Lego Batman Movie	February 10, 2017	United States	Digital 3D	2.39:1	104	Also released in IMAX 3D and 4DX in selected territories.
The Game Changer	February 10, 2017	China			140	
Kong: Skull Island	March 10, 2017	United States	Filmed in 2D	2.39:1	118	3D conversion by Prime Focus. Also released in IMAX 3D and 4DX.
Beauty and the Beast	March 17, 2017	United States	Filmed in 2D	2.39:1	129	3D conversion by Prime Focus. Also released in IMAX 3D and 4DX, with the entire film opened up to a 1.90:1 aspect ratio.
Ghost in the Shell	March 31, 2017	United States	Filmed in 2D	1.85:1	106	3D conversion by Prime Focus. Also released in IMAX 3D and 4DX.
The Boss Baby	March 31, 2017	United States	Digital 3D	2.35:1	97	Also released in 4DX.
The Age of Pioneers	April 6, 2017	Russia	Digital 3D	2.35:1	140	
Smurfs: The Lost Village	April 7, 2017	United States	Digital 3D	1.85:1	90	Also released in 4DX.
The Fate of the Furious	April 14, 2017	United States	Filmed in 2D	2.39:1	136	3D conversion by Stereo D. Also released in IMAX 3D and 4DX in selected territories.
Guardians of the Galaxy Vol. 2	May 5, 2017	United States	Filmed in 2D	2.39:1	137	3D conversion by Stereo D and Southbay. Also released in IMAX 3D and 4DX, with select scenes opened up to a 1.90:1 aspect ratio.
King Arthur: Legend of the Sword	May 12, 2017	United States	Filmed in 2D	2.39:1	126	3D conversion by Legend3D, Prime Focus, and Stereo D. Also released in 4DX.
Sahara	May 12, 2017	France Canada		2.35:1	86	
Pirates of the Caribbean: Dead Men Tell No Tales	May 26, 2017	United States	Filmed in 2D	2.39:1	129	3D conversion by Legend3D and Prime Focus.
Wonder Woman	June 2, 2017	United States	Filmed in 2D	2.39:1	141	3D conversion by Gener8. Also released in IMAX 3D and 4DX.
Captain Underpants: The First Epic Movie	June 2, 2017	United States	Digital 3D	1.85:1	89	Also released in 4DX.
The Mummy	June 9, 2017	United States	Filmed in 2D	2.39:1	110	3D conversion by Stereo D. Also released in IMAX 3D and 4DX.
Cars 3	June 16, 2017	United States	Digital 3D	2.39:1	102	Also released in IMAX 3D and 4DX.
Transformers: The Last Knight	June 21, 2017	United States	Arri Alexa IMAX, Red Epic, Red Weapon	2.39:1	149	3D conversion by Prime Focus. Also released in IMAX 3D and 4DX. Scenes filmed with IMAX 3D cameras opened up to a 1.90:1 aspect ratio.
Despicable Me 3	June 30, 2017	United States	Digital 3D	2.39:1	90	Also released in IMAX 3D and 4DX in selected territories.
Spider-Man: Homecoming	July 7, 2017	United States	Filmed in 2D	2.39:1	133	3D conversion by Stereo D and Legend3D. Also released in IMAX 3D and 4DX.
Wu Kong	July 13, 2017	China	Filmed in 2D	2.39:1	130	Also released in IMAX 3D in China.
War for the Planet of the Apes	July 14, 2017	United States	Filmed in 2D	2.39:1	140	3D conversion by Stereo D and Prime Focus. Also released in 4DX.
Valerian and the City of a Thousand Planets	July 21, 2017	France	Filmed in 2D	2.39:1	137	3D Conversion by Southbay. Also released in IMAX 3D and 4DX in selected territories.
The Son of Bigfoot	July 26, 2017 (Netherlands) August 16, 2017 (France)	Belgium France	Digital 3D	2.39:1	92	
The Jungle Bunch	July 26, 2017	France		2.35:1	97	
Wolf Warrior 2	July 27, 2017	China	Filmed in 2D	2.35:1	123	
The Emoji Movie	July 28, 2017	United States	Digital 3D	2.39:1	86	
Once Upon a Time	August 4, 2017	China	Filmed in 2D	2.39:1	109	
The Nut Job 2: Nutty by Nature	August 11, 2017	United States	Digital 3D	1.85:1	91	
Legend of the Naga Pearls	August 11, 2017	China		1.85:1	108	Also released in IMAX 3D in China.
Monster Family	August 24, 2017	United Kingdom Germany		2.35:1	93	
Deep	August 25, 2017	United States Spain	Digital 3D	1.85:1	92	
Terminator 2: Judgment Day	August 25, 2017	United States	Filmed in 2D	2.35:1	137	Also released in 4DX. 3D conversion by Stereo D. Originally released in 2D in 1991.
Tad the Lost Explorer and the Secret of King Midas	August 25, 2017	Spain	Digital 3D	2.39:1	85	
Harvie and the Magic Museum	August 31, 2017	Czech Republic			86	
Kingsman: The Golden Circle	September 20, 2017 (UK) September 22, 2017 (USA)	United States	Filmed in 2D	2.39:1	141	3D conversion by Stereo D. Also released in IMAX 3D and 4DX in selected territories, with select scenes opened up to a 1.90:1 aspect ratio.
The Lego Ninjago Movie	September 22, 2017	United States	Digital 3D	2.39:1	101	Live-action sequence of 3D conversion by Legend3D.
The Foreigner	September 30, 2017 (China) October 13, 2017 (USA)	China United Kingdom	Filmed in 2D	2.39:1	114	Also released in IMAX 3D in China.
The Little Vampire 3D	October 4, 2017	Netherlands		2.35:1	83	
Salyut-7	October 5, 2017	Russia	Filmed in 2D	2.35:1	111	Also released in IMAX 3D in Russia and the CIS.
Blade Runner 2049	October 6, 2017	United States	Filmed in 2D	2.39:1	163	3D conversion by Stereo D. Also released in IMAX 3D and 4DX, with the entire film opened up to a 1.90:1 aspect ratio.
Condorito: La Película	October 12, 2017	Chile Peru			88	
Dino King 3D: Journey to Fire Mountain	October 14, 2017	South Korea			95	
Geostorm	October 20, 2017	United States	Filmed in 2D	2.39:1	109	3D conversion by Stereo D. Also released in IMAX 3D and 4DX.
Into the Rainbow	November 1, 2017	China New Zealand		2.39:1	88	
Lajka	November 2, 2017	Czech Republic			85	
The Treasure	November 2, 2017	Hong Kong China				
Thor: Ragnarok	November 3, 2017	United States	Filmed in 2D	2.39:1	130	3D conversion by Stereo D and Legend3D. Also released in IMAX 3D and 4DX, with select scenes opened up to a 1.90:1 aspect ratio.
Justice League	November 17, 2017	United States	Filmed in 2D	1.85:1	120	3D conversion by Gener8. Also released in IMAX 3D and 4DX.
Coco	November 22, 2017	United States	Digital 3D	2.39:1	105	Won Academy Award for Best Animated Feature. Also released in IMAX 3D and 4DX.
Star Wars: The Last Jedi	December 15, 2017	United States	Filmed in 2D	2.39:1	152	3D conversion by Stereo D. Also released in IMAX 3D and 4DX.
Ferdinand	December 15, 2017	United States	Digital 3D	2.39:1	108	Also released in 4DX.
The Thousand Faces of Dunjia	December 15, 2017 (China) December 21, 2017 (Hong Kong)	China Hong Kong		1.85:1	113	Also released in IMAX 3D in China.
Jumanji: Welcome to the Jungle	December 20, 2017	United States	Filmed in 2D	2.39:1	119	3D conversion by Gener8. Also released in IMAX 3D and 4DX.
Wonders of the Sea 3D	December 21, 2017	United Kingdom France		1.85:1	82	
Bleeding Steel	December 22, 2017	China	Filmed in 2D	2.39:1	110	Also released in IMAX 3D in China.

==== 2018 ====
Title	Release date	Prod. country	Camera system	Aspect ratio	Runtime min	Notes
Padmaavat	January 25, 2018	India	Filmed in 2D	2.39:1	163	3D conversion by Prime Focus.
Maze Runner: The Death Cure	January 26, 2018	United States	Filmed in 2D	2.39:1	142	Also released in IMAX 3D and 4DX in selected territories, with the entire film opened up to a 1.90:1 aspect ratio.
Black Panther	February 16, 2018	United States	Filmed in 2D	2.39:1	134	3D conversion by Stereo D, DNEG, and Legend3D. Also released in IMAX 3D and 4DX, with select scenes opened up to a 1.90:1 aspect ratio.
Operation Red Sea	February 16, 2018	China	Filmed in 2D	2.39:1	138	Also released in IMAX 3D in China.
Monster Hunt 2	February 16, 2018	China; Hong Kong	Digital 3D	2.39:1	110	
A Wrinkle in Time	March 9, 2018	United States	Filmed in 2D	2.39:1	109	3D conversion by Gener8, and Legend3D. Also released in IMAX 3D and 4DX in selected territories.
Tomb Raider	March 16, 2018	United States	Filmed in 2D	2.39:1	118	3D conversion by Southbay. Also released in IMAX 3D and 4DX.
Pacific Rim Uprising	March 23, 2018	United States	Filmed in 2D	2.39:1	111	3D conversion by Prime Focus. Also released in IMAX 3D and 4DX.
Sherlock Gnomes	March 23, 2018	United States	Digital 3D	2.39:1	86	
Ready Player One	March 29, 2018	United States	Filmed in 2D	2.39:1	140	3D conversion by Stereo D. Also released in IMAX 3D and 4DX.
Just a Breath Away	April 4, 2018	France Canada		2.39:1	89	
Rampage	April 13, 2018	United States	Filmed in 2D	2.39:1	107	3D conversion by Stereo D. Also released in IMAX 3D and 4DX.
Avengers: Infinity War	April 27, 2018	United States	Filmed in 2D	2.39:1	149	3D conversion by Stereo D and DNEG. Also released in IMAX 3D and 4DX, with the entire film opened up to a 1.90:1 aspect ratio.
Solo: A Star Wars Story	May 25, 2018	United States	Filmed in 2D	2.39:1	135	3D conversion by Stereo D. Also released in IMAX 3D and 4DX.
Incredibles 2	June 15, 2018	United States	Digital 3D	2.39:1	118	Also released in IMAX 3D and 4DX.
Race 3	June 15, 2018	India	Filmed in 2D	2:39:1	160	3D conversion by DNEG.
Jurassic World: Fallen Kingdom	June 22, 2018	United States	Filmed in 2D	2.39:1	128	3D conversion by Stereo D. Also released in IMAX 3D and 4DX.
Animal World	June 29, 2018	China	Filmed in 2D	2.66:1	132	Also released in IMAX 3D.
Ant-Man and the Wasp	July 6, 2018	United States	Filmed in 2D	2.39:1	118	3D conversion by Stereo D, DNEG, and Legend3D. Also released in IMAX 3D and 4DX, with select scenes opened up to a 1.90:1 aspect ratio.
Hotel Transylvania 3: Summer Vacation	July 13, 2018	United States	Digital 3D	1.85:1	97	
Skyscraper	July 13, 2018	United States	Filmed in 2D	2.39:1	102	3D conversion by Stereo D. Also released in IMAX 3D and 4DX.
Mission: Impossible – Fallout	July 27, 2018	United States	Filmed in 2D	2.39:1	147	3D conversion by DNEG. Also released in IMAX 3D and 4DX in selected territories, with select scenes opened up to a 1.90:1 aspect ratio.
Detective Dee: The Four Heavenly Kings	July 27, 2018	China	STEREOTEC 3D Rigs	2.39:1	132	Also released in IMAX 3D in China, with the entire film opened up to a 1.90:1 aspect ratio.
The Meg	August 10, 2018	United States	Filmed in 2D	2.39:1	113	3D conversion by Legend3D. Also released in IMAX 3D and 4DX.
Alpha	August 17, 2018	United States	Filmed in 2D	2.39:1	96	3D conversion by Legend3D and Stereo D. Also released in IMAX 3D and 4DX.
The Predator	September 14, 2018	United States	Filmed in 2D	2.39:1	107	Also released in IMAX 3D and 4DX in selected territories.
Smallfoot	September 28, 2018	United States	Digital 3D	2.39:1	98	Also released in 4DX.
Venom	October 5, 2018	United States	Filmed in 2D	2.39:1	112	3D conversion by DNEG. Also released in IMAX 3D and 4DX.
The Nutcracker and the Four Realms	November 2, 2018	United States	Filmed in 2D	1.85:1	99	3D conversion by DNEG and Gener8. Also released in 4DX.
Dr. Seuss' The Grinch	November 9, 2018	United States	Digital 3D	2.39:1	86	Also released in IMAX 3D and 4DX.
They Shall Not Grow Old	November 9, 2018	New Zealand	Digital 3D	1.85:1	99	
Fantastic Beasts: The Crimes of Grindelwald	November 16, 2018	United States	Filmed in 2D	2.39:1	134	3D conversion by Stereo D, Gener8 and DNEG. Also released in IMAX 3D and 4DX, Enhanced framing technique known as "Frame-Break" used to enhance 3D effects, making effects travel "outside" the frame.
Ralph Breaks the Internet	November 21, 2018	United States	Digital 3D	2.39:1	112	Also released in IMAX 3D and 4DX in selected territories.
2.0	November 29, 2018	India	Fusion Camera System	2.39:1	147	Select 3D Conversion by Rays 3D.
Mowgli: Legend of the Jungle	November 29, 2018	United States	Filmed in 2D	2.39:1	104	Also released in IMAX 3D in selected territories.
Asterix: The Secret of the Magic Potion	December 5, 2018	France Belgium	Digital 3D	1.85:1	85	
Mortal Engines	December 14, 2018	New Zealand United States	Filmed in 2D	2.39:1	128	3D conversion by Stereo D. Also released in IMAX 3D and 4DX.
Spider-Man: Into the Spider-Verse	December 14, 2018	United States	Digital 3D	2.39:1	117	Won Academy Award for Best Animated Feature. Also released in IMAX 3D and 4DX.
Aquaman	December 21, 2018	United States	Filmed in 2D	2.39:1	143	3D conversion by DNEG and Gener8. Also released in IMAX 3D and 4DX, with 100 minutes of footage opened up to a 1.90:1 aspect ratio.
Bumblebee	December 21, 2018	United States	Filmed in 2D	1.85:1	114	3D conversion by Stereo D. Also released in IMAX 3D and 4DX.
Mojin: The Worm Valley	December 29, 2018	China		2.35:1	110	Also released in IMAX 3D.
Long Day's Journey into Night	December 31, 2018	China France	First half filmed in 2D and the second half filmed in 2D and converted from 2D to 3D.	1.85:1	138	

==== 2019 ====
Title	Release date	Prod. country	Camera system	Aspect ratio	Runtime min	Notes
Sheep and Wolves: Pig Deal	January 24, 2019	Russia	Digital 3D	2.35:1	85	
Minuscule 2: The Mandibles from Far Away	January 30, 2019	France	Digital 3D	2.35:1	92	
The Wandering Earth	February 5, 2019	China	Filmed in 2D	2.55:1	125	Also released in IMAX 3D in China, New Zealand, and a limited three-day release in North America.
The Lego Movie 2: The Second Part	February 8, 2019	United States	Digital 3D	2.39:1	107	Live-action sequence of 3D conversion by Legend3D. Also released in IMAX 3D and 4DX.
The Queen's Corgi	February 13, 2019	United States	Digital 3D	1.85:1	85	
Alita: Battle Angel	February 14, 2019	United States	Fusion Camera System	2.39:1	122	3D conversion by Stereo D. Also released in IMAX 3D and 4DX, with select scenes opened up to a 1.90:1 aspect ratio.
How to Train Your Dragon: The Hidden World	February 22, 2019	United States	Digital 3D	2.35:1	104	Also released in IMAX 3D and 4DX in selected territories.
Birds of a Feather	February 28, 2019	Germany	Digital 3D	1.85:1	90	
Captain Marvel	March 8, 2019	United States	Filmed in 2D	2.39:1	124	3D conversion by Stereo D and Legend3D. Also released in IMAX 3D and 4DX in selected territories, with select scenes opened up to a 1.90:1 aspect ratio.
Wonder Park	March 15, 2019	United States	Digital 3D	2.39:1	93	
Dumbo	March 29, 2019	United States	Filmed in 2D	1.85:1	112	3D conversion by DNEG. Also released in IMAX 3D and 4DX in selected territories.
Shazam!	April 5, 2019	United States	Filmed in 2D	2.39:1	132	3D conversion by DNEG. Also released in IMAX 3D and 4DX.
Astro Kid	April 5, 2019	France	Digital 3D	2.39:1	90	
Missing Link	April 12, 2019	United States	Digital 3D	2.39:1	98	
The Big Trip	April 12, 2019	Russia United States	Digital 3D	2.35:1	84	
Avengers: Endgame	April 26, 2019	United States	Filmed in 2D	2.39:1	181	3D conversion by Stereo D, DNEG, and Legend3D. Also released in IMAX 3D and 4DX, with the entire film opened up to a 1.90:1 aspect ratio.
Pokémon: Detective Pikachu	May 3, 2019	United States Japan	Filmed in 2D	2.39:1	104	3D conversion by Legend3D. Also released in IMAX 3D and 4DX.
Aladdin	May 24, 2019	United States	Filmed in 2D	2.39:1	128	3D conversion by DNEG. Also released in IMAX 3D and 4DX.
Godzilla: King of the Monsters	May 31, 2019	United States	Filmed in 2D	2.39:1	132	3D conversion by DNEG. Also released in IMAX 3D and 4DX.
Dark Phoenix	June 7, 2019	United States	Filmed in 2D	2.39:1	114	3D conversion by Stereo D. Also released in IMAX 3D and 4DX in selected territories.
The Secret Life of Pets 2	June 7, 2019	United States	Digital 3D	1.85:1	86	Also released in 4DX.
Men in Black: International	June 14, 2019	United States	Filmed in 2D	1.85:1	115	3D conversion by DNEG. Also released in IMAX 3D and 4DX in selected territories.
Toy Story 4	June 21, 2019	United States	Digital 3D	2.39:1	100	Also released in IMAX 3D and 4DX in selected territories.
Spider-Man: Far From Home	July 2, 2019	United States	Filmed in 2D	2.39:1	129	3D conversion by Stereo D and Legend3D. Also released in IMAX 3D, with select scenes opened up to a 1.90:1 aspect ratio.
Pokémon: Mewtwo Strikes Back—Evolution	July 12, 2019	Japan	Digital 3D	1.85:1	98	Only in selected territories.
The Lion King	July 19, 2019	United States	Fusion Camera System	1.85:1	118	Also released in IMAX 3D and 4DX, with select scenes opened up to a 1.43:1 aspect ratio for IMAX Laser GT presentations.
Dragon Quest: Your Story	July 16, 2019	Japan	Digital 3D	2.39:1	103	Only in selected territories.
Ne Zha	July 26, 2019	China	Digital 3D	2.39:1	110	Also released in IMAX 3D in China.
Fast & Furious Presents: Hobbs & Shaw	August 2, 2019	United States	Filmed in 2D	2.39:1	136	3D conversion by Stereo D. Also released in IMAX 3D and 4DX in selected territories.
The Angry Birds Movie 2	August 2, 2019	United States	Digital 3D	1.85:1	97	Also released in 4DX.
Playmobil: The Movie	August 7, 2019	United States	Digital 3D	2.39:1	99	
BoBoiBoy Movie 2	August 8, 2019	Malaysia			110	Also released in IMAX 3D in Malaysia.
Kurukshetra	August 9, 2019	India			185	
Viy 2: Journey to China	August 16, 2019	Russia China	STEREOTEC 3D Rigs	1.90:1	124	Also released in IMAX 3D in selected territories.
Abominable	September 27, 2019	United States China	Digital 3D	1.85:1	97	Also released in 4DX.
Mosley	October 10, 2019	New Zealand		2.35:1	96	
Gemini Man	October 11, 2019	United States	Arri Alexa and STEREOTEC 3D Rigs	1.85:1	117	3D conversion and design by Stereo D. Also released in IMAX 3D, 4DX, and HFR "3D+" in select theaters. Filmed at 120FPS and 4K HDR resolution.
The Addams Family	October 11, 2019	United States Canada	Rendered in 2D	1.85:1	87	Also released in 4DX. 3D conversion by DNEG.
Maleficent: Mistress of Evil	October 18, 2019	United States	Filmed in 2D	2.39:1	119	3D conversion by DNEG. Also released in 4DX.
Arctic Dogs	November 1, 2019	United Kingdom United States; Canada	Digital 3D	2.39:1	93	Also released in IMAX 3D.
Pets United	November 8, 2019	Germany China; United Kingdom	Digital 3D	1.85:1	89	
Frozen 2	November 22, 2019	United States	Digital 3D	2.39:1	103	Also released in IMAX 3D and 4DX in selected territories.
StarDog and TurboCat	December 6, 2019	United Kingdom	Digital 3D	1.85:1	90	
Jumanji: The Next Level	December 13, 2019	United States	Filmed in 2D	2.39:1	123	3D conversion by DNEG. Also released in IMAX 3D and 4DX.
Star Wars: The Rise of Skywalker	December 20, 2019	United States	Filmed in 2D	2.39:1	142	3D conversion by Stereo D. Also released in IMAX 3D and 4DX.
Spies in Disguise	December 25, 2019	United States	Digital 3D	2.39:1	102	The final 20th Century Fox and Blue Sky Studios film to be presented and released in stereoscopic 3D.

=== 2020s ===
==== 2020 ====
Title	Release date	Prod. country	Camera system	Aspect ratio	Runtime min	Notes
Tanhaji	January 10, 2020	India	Filmed in 2D	2.35:1	135	3D conversion by DNEG.
Dolittle	January 17, 2020	United States	Filmed in 2D	1.85:1	101	3D conversion by Stereo D. Also released in IMAX 3D and 4DX.
Onward	March 6, 2020 (Note: Due to movie theaters closures because of the COVID-19 pandemic, the film was released digitally in the United States and Canada through Premium VOD on the night of March 20, 2020 and became available for Disney+ subscribers on April 3, 2020 in the United States and Canada. This affected the number of projections and the box office performance of the 3D screenings. As the pandemic receded, the film was released back in regular theaters.)	United States	Digital 3D	2.39:1	102	Also released in IMAX 3D and 4DX.
Trolls World Tour	April 10, 2020 (Note: The film was originally planned to be released theatrically in the United States on this date. However, on March 16, Universal Pictures announced that the film would be released simultaneously in drive-in theaters, as regular movie theaters closed due to the restrictions caused by the COVID-19 pandemic, and through Premium VOD in the United States, Canada, United Kingdom, South Korea and Italy. This affected the number of projections and the box office performance of the 3D screenings. As the pandemic receded, the film was released back in regular theaters.)	United States	Digital 3D	2.35:1	91	Also released in IMAX 3D and 4DX.
Bigfoot Family	August 5, 2020	Belgium France	Digital 3D	2.39:1	90	
Harry Potter and the Philosopher's Stone	August 14, 2020	United States	Filmed in 2D	2.39:1	152	3D conversion by DNEG. Also released in 4DX. Originally released in 2001.
Cosmoball	August 27, 2020	Russia	Filmed in 2D	2.39:1	118	Also released in IMAX 3D.
Mulan	September 11, 2020 (Note: On August 4, 2020, Disney announced that due to the COVID-19 pandemic the film's wide theatrical release was cancelled in the United States and would instead premiere the film for a premium fee on Disney+ on September 4, 2020. However, the film was still released theatrically in select countries where theaters had re-opened, and where Disney+ isn't available.)	United States	Filmed in 2D	2.39:1	115	3D conversion by DNEG. Also released in IMAX 3D and 4DX.
Space Dogs: Return to Earth	September 24, 2020	Russia	Digital 3D	1.85:1	80	
Jiang Ziya: Legend of Deification	October 1, 2020	China	Digital 3D	2.39:1	110	Also released in IMAX 3D.
Dragon Rider	October 1, 2020	Germany	Digital 3D	2.39:1	92	
Sea Level 2: Magic Arch	October 29, 2020	Russia	Digital 3D	2.39:1	84	
Stand by Me Doraemon 2	November 20, 2020	Japan	Digital 3D	1.85:1	96	
The Croods: A New Age	November 25, 2020	United States	Digital 3D	2.35:1	95	Also released in IMAX 3D in China.
Monster Hunter	December 3, 2020	United States	Filmed in 2D	2.39:1	103	3D conversion by Stereo D. Also released in IMAX 3D in China, the Netherlands and Japan.
Wonder Woman 1984	December 25, 2020 (Note: Theatrically released in international markets that don't have HBO Max on December 16 and on HBO Max on December 25, 2020 in the United States.)	United States	Filmed in 2D	2.39:1	151	3D conversion by DNEG. Also released in IMAX 3D and 4DX, with select scenes opened up to a 1.90:1 aspect ratio.
Soul	December 25, 2020 (Note: On October 8, 2020, Disney announced that due to the COVID-19 pandemic the film's wide theatrical release was cancelled in the United States and would instead premiere the film on Disney+ on December 25, 2020. However, the film was still released theatrically in select countries where theaters had re-opened, and where Disney+ isn't available. Unlike Mulan, the film was not released as a "Premier Access" release, and is free to all subscribers. It was later released in 3D theaters in the United States on January 12, 2024.)	United States	Digital 3D	2.39:1	100	Also released in IMAX 3D and 4DX.

==== 2021 ====
Title	Release date	Prod. country	Camera system	Aspect ratio	Runtime min	Notes
Iron Mask	June 3, 2021	Russia China	STEREOTEC 3D Rigs	1.85:1	120	Filmed native on STEREOTEC 3D Rigs. Also titled Viy 2: Journey to China and Iron Mask Mystery Of The Dragon Seal
Maya the Bee: The Golden Orb	January 7, 2021	Australia	Digital 3D	1.85:1	88	
Wish Dragon	January 15, 2021	United States China	Digital 3D	1.85:1	98	Also released in IMAX 3D and 4DX in selected territories.
Extinct	February 11, 2021	Canada United States China	Digital 3D	2.39:1	84	
New Gods: Nezha Reborn	February 12, 2021	China	Filmed in 2D	2.39:1	116	Also released in IMAX 3D.
A Writer's Odyssey	February 12, 2021	China	Filmed in 3D	2.39:1		Also released in IMAX 3D.
Boonie Bears: The Wild Life	February 12, 2021	China	Digital 3D	2.35:1	99	
Ainbo: Spirit of the Amazon	March 3, 2021	Netherlands Peru	Digital 3D	2.39:1	89	
Raya and the Last Dragon	March 5, 2021	United States	Digital 3D	2.39:1	107	Also released in IMAX 3D and 4DX.
Godzilla vs. Kong	March 24, 2021	United States	Filmed in 2D	2.39:1	113	3D conversion by DNEG. Also released in IMAX 3D and 4DX.
F9	June 25, 2021	United States	Filmed in 2D	2.39:1	145	3D conversion by DNEG. Also released in IMAX 3D and 4DX.
The Boss Baby: Family Business	July 2, 2021	United States	Digital 3D	2.39:1	107	
Black Widow	July 9, 2021	United States	Filmed in 2D	2.39:1	134	3D conversion by Stereo D and Legend3D. Also released in IMAX 3D and 4DX, with select scenes opened up to a 1.90:1 aspect ratio.
Jungle Cruise	July 30, 2021	United States	Filmed in 2D	2.39:1	127	3D conversion by DNEG. Also released in IMAX 3D and 4DX.
Free Guy	August 13, 2021	United States	Filmed in 2D	2.39:1	115	3D conversion by Stereo D. Also released in IMAX 3D and 4DX.
Bell Bottom	August 19, 2021	India	Filmed in 2D	2.39:1	123	3D conversion by DNEG.
Shang-Chi and the Legend of the Ten Rings	September 3, 2021	United States	Filmed in 2D	2.39:1	132	3D conversion by Stereo D and Legend3D. Also released in IMAX 3D and 4DX, with the entire film opened up to a 1.90:1 aspect ratio.
Venom: Let There Be Carnage	September 14, 2021	United States	Filmed in 2D	1.85:1	97	3D conversion by DNEG. Also released in IMAX 3D and 4DX.
No Time to Die	September 30, 2021	United Kingdom United States	Filmed in 2D	2.39:1	163	3D conversion by DNEG. Also released in IMAX 3D and 4DX.
The Curse of Turandot	October 15, 2021	China			111	
Ron's Gone Wrong	October 9, 2021 (65th BFI London Film Festival); October 15, 2021 (United Kingdom); October 22, 2021 (United States)	United Kingdom; United States	Rendered in 2D	2.35:1	107	3D conversion by DNEG.
Dune	October 22, 2021	United States	Filmed in 2D	2.39:1	156	3D conversion by DNEG. Also released in IMAX 3D and 4DX, with select scenes opened up to 1.43:1 and 1.90:1 aspect ratios for IMAX Laser GT presentations.
Monster Family 2	November 4, 2021	Germany		2.39:1	103	
Eternals	November 5, 2021	United States	Filmed in 2D	2.39:1	157	3D conversion by Stereo D and Legend3D. Also released in IMAX 3D and 4DX, with select scenes opened up to 1.43:1 and 1.90:1 aspect ratios for IMAX Laser GT presentations.
Encanto	November 24, 2021	United States	Digital 3D	1.85:1	109	Also released in 4DX.
Spider-Man: No Way Home	December 17, 2021	United States	Filmed in 2D	2.39:1	149	3D conversion by Stereo D. Also released in IMAX 3D and 4DX, with the entire film opened up to a 1.90:1 aspect ratio.
Sing 2	December 22, 2021	United States	Digital 3D	1.85:1	110	Also released in 4DX.
83	December 24, 2021	India	Filmed in 2D	1.78:1	161	3D conversion by DNEG.

==== 2022 ====
Title	Release date	Prod. country	Camera system	Aspect ratio	Runtime min	Notes
Ireland	February 11, 2022				43	
Chickenhare and the Hamster of Darkness	February 16, 2022	Belgium France		2.35:1	91	
RRR	March 24, 2022	India	Filmed in 2D	2.39:1	182	3D conversion by DNEG. Also released in IMAX 3D and 4DX.
The Bad Guys	April 22, 2022	United States	Rendered in 2D	2.39:1	100	3D Conversion by Stereo D.
Doctor Strange in the Multiverse of Madness	May 6, 2022	United States	Filmed in 2D	2.39:1	126	3D conversion by Stereo D. Also released in IMAX 3D and 4DX, with the entire film opened up to a 1.90:1 aspect ratio.
Secrets of the Sea	June 8, 2022					
Jurassic World Dominion	June 10, 2022	United States	Filmed in 2D	2.00:1	146	3D conversion by DNEG. Also released in IMAX 3D and 4DX.
Lightyear	June 17, 2022	United States	Digital 3D	2.39:1	105	Also released in IMAX 3D and 4DX, with 50 minutes of footage opened up to 1.43:1 and 1.90:1 aspect ratios for IMAX Laser GT presentations.
Minions: The Rise of Gru	July 1, 2022	United States	Digital 3D	2.39:1	87	Also released in IMAX 3D and 4DX in selected territories.
Thor: Love and Thunder	July 8, 2022	United States	Filmed in 2D	2.39:1	119	3D conversion by Stereo D. Also released in IMAX 3D and 4DX in selected territories, with select scenes opened up to a 1.90:1 aspect ratio.
Vikrant Rona	July 28, 2022	India	Filmed in 2D	2.39:1	167	3D Conversion by Rays 3D.
Jaws	September 2, 2022	United States	Filmed in 2D	2.39:1	124	3D conversion and design by SDFX Studios. Originally released in 2D in 1975. Also released in IMAX 3D and 4DX.
Brahmāstra: Part One – Shiva	September 9, 2022	India	Filmed in 2D	2.39:1	167	3D conversion by DNEG. Also released in IMAX 3D and 4DX.
Black Panther: Wakanda Forever	November 11, 2022	United States	Filmed in 2D	2.39:1	161	3D conversion by SDFX Studios. Also released in IMAX 3D and 4DX in selected territories, with select scenes opened up to a 1.90:1 aspect ratio.
Strange World	November 23, 2022	United States	Digital 3D	2.39:1	102	Also released in 4DX.
Avatar: The Way of Water	December 16, 2022	United States	Fusion Camera System	1.85:1 and 2.39:1	192	Also released in IMAX 3D and 4DX. 3D Conversion by SDFX Studios.
Puss in Boots: The Last Wish	December 21, 2022	United States	Rendered in 2D	2.39:1	102	3D Conversion by SDFX Studios.

==== 2023 ====
Title	Release date	Prod. country	Camera system	Aspect ratio	Runtime min	Notes
The Amazing Maurice	February 16, 2023	United Kingdom	Digital 3D	2.35:1	93	
Ant-Man and the Wasp: Quantumania	February 17, 2023	United States	Filmed in 2D	2.39:1	124	3D Conversion by SDFX Studios. Also released in IMAX 3D and 4DX in selected territories, with select scenes opened up to a 1.90:1 aspect ratio.
Scream VI	March 10, 2023	United States	Filmed in 2D	2.39:1	123	3D conversion by DNEG. Also released in 4DX.
The Super Mario Bros. Movie	April 5, 2023	United States	Digital 3D	2.39:1	92	Also released in IMAX 3D and 4DX.
Guardians of the Galaxy Vol. 3	May 5, 2023	United States	Filmed in 2D	2.39:1 on 2.39:1 screens. Select scenes opened up to a 1.85:1 aspect ratio on 1.85:1 screens.	149	3D Conversion by SDFX Studios. Also released in IMAX 3D and 4DX in selected territories, with the entire film opened up to a 1.90:1 aspect ratio.
Fast X	May 19, 2023	United States	Filmed in 2D	2.39:1	141	3D conversion by DNEG. Also released in IMAX 3D and 4DX.
The Little Mermaid	May 26, 2023	United States	Filmed in 2D	2.39:1	135	3D conversion by DNEG. Also released in IMAX 3D and 4DX, with select scenes opened up to a 1.90:1 aspect ratio.
Transformers: Rise of the Beasts	June 9, 2023	United States	Filmed in 2D	2.39:1	117	3D conversion by DNEG. Also released in IMAX 3D and 4DX.
Elemental	June 16, 2023	United States	Digital 3D	1.85:1	101	Also released in 4DX.
Teenage Mutant Ninja Turtles: Mutant Mayhem	August 2, 2023	United States	Rendered in 2D	2.39:1	100	Also releases in 4DX. 3D conversion by SDFX Studios.
Meg 2: The Trench	August 4, 2023	United States	Filmed in 2D	2.39:1	116	3D conversion by DNEG. Also released in IMAX 3D and 4DX.
The Inseparables (2023 film)	August 10, 2023	Belgium	Digital 3D	2.39:1	TBA	
The Marvels	November 10, 2023	United States	Filmed in 2D	2.39:1	103	3D Conversion by SDFX Studios and SEECUBIC. Also released in IMAX 3D and 4DX in selected territories, with select scenes opened up to a 1.90:1 aspect ratio.
Trolls Band Together	November 17, 2023	United States	Rendered in 2D	2.39:1	91	3D conversion by SDFX Studios.
Wish	November 22, 2023	United States	Digital 3D	2.55:1	92	Also released in 4DX.
Migration	December 22, 2023	United States	Digital 3D	2.39:1	82	Also released in 4DX.
Aquaman and the Lost Kingdom	December 22, 2023	United States	Filmed in 2D	1.78:1 and 2.39:1	124	3D conversion by SDFX Studios. Also released in IMAX 3D and 4DX.

==== 2024 ====
Title	Release date	Prod. country	Camera system	Aspect ratio	Runtime min	Notes
Fighter	January 25, 2024	India	Filmed in 2D	2.39:1	166	3D conversion by DNEG.
Kung Fu Panda 4	March 8, 2024	United States	Rendered in 2D	2.39:1	94	Also released in 4DX. 3D conversion by SDFX Studios.
Godzilla x Kong: The New Empire	March 29, 2024	United States	Filmed in 2D	2.39:1	115	3D conversion by DNEG. Also released in IMAX 3D and 4DX, with select scenes opened up to a 1.90:1 aspect ratio.
The Garfield Movie	May 24, 2024	United States	Rendered in 2D	1.85:1	101	3D conversion by DNEG. Also released in 4DX.
Kalki 2898 AD	June 27, 2024	India	Filmed in 2D	2.39.1	181	3D conversion by DNEG.
Inside Out 2	June 14, 2024	United States	Digital 3D	2.39:1	96	Also released in IMAX 3D and 4DX.
Despicable Me 4	July 3, 2024	United States	Digital 3D	1.85:1	95	Also released in IMAX 3D and 4DX.
Deadpool & Wolverine	July 26, 2024	United States	Filmed in 2D	2.39:1	127	3D conversion by SDFX Studios and SEECUBIC. Also released in IMAX 3D and 4DX.
Gammera	August 1, 2024	Japan	Filmed in 2D	2.35:1	86	3D Conversion by EYEPOP-3D.
Twittering Soul	September 9, 2024	Norway	Filmed in 3D	1.85:1	70	
A.R.M.	September 3, 2024	India	Filmed in 2D	2.39:1	142	3D conversion by RAYS 3D.
Transformers One	September 20, 2024	United States	Rendered in 2D	2.39:1	104	3D conversion by SDFX Studios. Also released in IMAX 3D and 4DX.
The Wild Robot	September 27, 2024	United States	Rendered in 2D	2.39:1	103	3D conversion by SDFX Studios. Also released in IMAX 3D and 4DX.
Venom: The Last Dance	October 25, 2024	United States	Filmed in 2D	2.39:1	110	3D conversion by DNEG. Also released in IMAX 3D and 4DX, with select scenes opened up to a 1.90:1 aspect ratio.
Kanguva	November 13, 2024	India	Filmed in 2D	2.39:1	154	3D Conversion by Rays 3D.
Wicked	November 22, 2024	United States	Filmed in 2D	2.39:1	160	3D conversion by SDFX Studios. Also released in IMAX 3D and 4DX.
Moana 2	November 27, 2024	United States	Digital 3D	2.00:1	100	Also released in IMAX 3D and 4DX.
Pushpa 2: The Rule	December 13, 2024	India	Filmed in 2D	2.39:1	200	3D Conversion by Rays 3D.
Mufasa: The Lion King	December 20, 2024	United States	Digital 3D	1.85:1	118	Also released in IMAX 3D and 4DX.
Barroz 3D	December 25, 2024	India	Filmed in 3D	2.39:1	145	

==== 2025 ====
Title	Release date	Prod. country	Camera system	Aspect ratio	Runtime min	Notes
The Cocoanuts	January 1, 2025	United States	Filmed in 2D	1.33:1	93	3D Conversion by EYEPOP-3D.
Ne Zha 2	January 19, 2025	China	Digital 3D	2.39:1	144	
Captain America: Brave New World	February 14, 2025	United States	Filmed in 2D	2.39:1	118	3D conversion by SDFX Studios and SEECUBIC. Also released in IMAX 3D and 4DX, with select scenes opened up to a 1.90:1 aspect ratio.
A Minecraft Movie	April 4, 2025	United States	Filmed in 2D	1.85:1	101	Also released in IMAX 3D and 4DX. 3D Conversion by DNEG.
Thunderbolts*	May 2, 2025	United States	Filmed in 2D	2.39:1	126	3D Conversion by SDFX Studios and SEECUBIC. Also released in IMAX 3D and 4DX, with select scenes opened up to a 1.90:1 aspect ratio.
Lovely	May 2, 2025	India	Filmed in 2D	2.39:1	145	
The Universal Hero and the Otherworldly Beauty	May 9, 2025	India	Filmed in 2D	2.39:1	145	
Lilo & Stitch	May 23, 2025	United States	Filmed in 2D	2.39:1	108	Also released in 4DX. 3D Conversion by Outsyders Technology Inc. First film to be converted to stereoscopic 3D using artificial intelligence (A.I.).
How to Train Your Dragon	June 13, 2025	United States	Filmed in 2D	2.39:1	125	3D Conversion by DNEG. Also released in IMAX 3D and 4DX, with select scenes opened up to a 1.90:1 aspect ratio.
Elio	June 20, 2025	United States	Digital 3D	2.39:1	99	Also released in 4DX.
Jurassic World Rebirth	July 2, 2025	United States	Filmed in 2D	2.39:1	133	3D Conversion by DNEG. Also released in 4DX.
Superman	July 11, 2025	United States	Filmed in 2D	1.85:1	129	3D Conversion by DNEG. Also released in IMAX 3D and 4DX.
The Fantastic Four: First Steps	July 25, 2025	United States	Filmed in 2D	2.39:1	114	3D conversion by SDFX Studios and SEECUBIC. Also released in IMAX 3D and 4DX, with the entire film opened up to a 1.90:1 aspect ratio.
Mahavatar Narsimha	July 25, 2025	India	Rendered in 2D	2.39:1	131	3D Conversion by Kleem Productions.
The Bad Guys 2	August 1, 2025	United States	Rendered in 2D	2.39:1	104	3D Conversion by SDFX Studios.
Tron: Ares	October 10, 2025	United States	Filmed in 2D	2.39:1	119	3D Conversion by Outsyders Technology and DNEG. Also released in IMAX 3D and 4DX, with select scenes opened up to a 1.90:1 aspect ratio.
Chainsaw Man - The Movie: Reze Arc	October 24, 2025	Japan	Filmed in 2D	2.35:1	100	3D Conversion by Redmond 3D. First anime film to be converted to stereoscopic 3D using artificial intelligence (A.I.).
Predator: Badlands	November 7, 2025	United States	Filmed in 2D	2.39:1	107	3D conversion by SDFX Studios, SEECUBIC and Outsyders Technology. Also released in IMAX 3D and 4DX.
Wicked: For Good	November 21, 2025	United States	Filmed in 2D	2.39:1	137	3D Conversion by SDFX Studios. Also released in IMAX 3D and 4DX.
Zootopia 2	November 26, 2025	United States	Digital 3D	2.39:1	108	Also released in IMAX 3D and 4DX.
The SpongeBob Movie: Search for SquarePants	December 19, 2025	United States	Rendered in 2D	1.85:1	88	3D Conversion by SDFX Studios.
Avatar: Fire and Ash	December 19, 2025	United States	Fusion Camera System	1.85:1 and 2.39:1	197	Also released in IMAX 3D, 4DX, and ScreenX. Select 3D Conversion by SDFX Studios and Outsyders Technology.

==== 2026 ====
Title	Release date	Prod. country	Camera system	Aspect ratio	Runtime min	Notes
Mercy	January 23, 2026	United States	Filmed in 2D	2.20:1	100	3D conversion by DNEG. Also released in IMAX 3D and 4DX, with select scenes opened up to a 1.90:1 aspect ratio.
Send Help	January 30, 2026	United States	Filmed in 2D	2.39:1 and 1.85:1	113	3D conversion by SEECUBIC and Outsyders Technology. Also released in 4DX and ScreenX.
Goat	February 13, 2026	United States	Rendered in 2D	2.39:1	100	Also released in 4DX. 3D conversion by Redmond 3D. First CGI-animated film to be converted to stereoscopic 3D using artificial intelligence (A.I.).
Blue Angels 3D	February 14, 2026	United States	Filmed in 3D	2.35:1	45	
Boonie Bears: The Hidden Protector	February 17, 2026	China	Digital 3D	2.39:1	118	
Hoppers	March 6, 2026	United States	Digital 3D	1.85:1	105	Also released in IMAX 3D and 4DX.
The Super Mario Galaxy Movie	April 1, 2026	United States	Digital 3D	2.39:1	98	Also released in IMAX 3D, 4DX, and ScreenX.
Biker	April 3, 2026	India	Filmed in 2D	2.39:1	98	
Billie Eilish – Hit Me Hard and Soft: The Tour (Live in 3D)	May 8, 2026	United States	Fusion Camera System	1.85:1	114	
Star Wars: The Mandalorian and Grogu	May 22, 2026	United States	Filmed in 2D	2.39:1	132	Also released in IMAX 3D, 4DX, and ScreenX. 3D conversion by SDFX Studios.
Haunted 3D: Echoes of the Past	June 12, 2026	India	Filmed in 2D	1.85:1	102	
Toy Story 5	June 19, 2026	United States	Digital 3D	1.85:1	102	Also released in IMAX 3D, 4DX, and ScreenX.
Supergirl	June 26, 2026	United States	Filmed in 2D	2.39:1	110	3D conversion by DNEG. Also released in IMAX 3D, 4DX, and ScreenX.
Minions & Monsters	July 1, 2026	United States	Digital 3D	2.39:1	90	Also released in IMAX 3D, 4DX, and ScreenX.
Moana	July 10, 2026	United States	Filmed in 2D	2.39:1	115	3D conversion by DNEG and Outsyders Technology. Also released in IMAX 3D, 4DX, and ScreenX.
All Wishes Come True!	July 24, 2026	China		2.39:1	144	
Spider-Man: Brand New Day	July 31, 2026	United States	Filmed in 2D	2.39:1	145	3D conversion by SDFX Studios, SeeCubic and DNEG. Also released in IMAX 3D, 4DX, and ScreenX with the entire film opened up to a 1.90:1 aspect ratio.
Cars	September 4, 2026	United States	Re-rendered in 3D	2.39:1	108	
Forgotten Island	September 25, 2026	United States	Rendered in 2D	2.39:1	108	3D conversion by SDFX Studios.
Avengers Endgame: Encore	September 25, 2026	United States	Filmed in 2D	2.39:1	184	3D conversion by SDFX Studios.
Pan's Labyrinth	October 9, 2026	United States	Filmed in 2D	2.39:1	120	3D conversion by SDFX Studios.
Dr. Seuss' The Cat in the Hat	November 6, 2026	United States	Rendered in 2D	2.00:1	107	3D conversion by DNEG.
Ramayana: Part 1	November 6, 2026	India	Filmed in 2D	2.00:1	195 (India) & 167 (overseas)	3D conversion by DNEG.
The Hunger Games: Sunrise on the Reaping	November 20, 2026	United States	Filmed in 2D	2.39:1	158	3D conversion by DNEG.
Hexed	November 25, 2026	United States	Digital 3D	1.85:1	103	
Avengers: Doomsday	December 18, 2026	United States	Filmed in 2D	2.39:1	165	
The Angry Birds Movie 3	December 23, 2026	United States	Rendered in 2D	1.85:1	96	3D conversion by DNEG.
Jumanji: Open World	December 25, 2026	United States	Filmed in 2D	2.39:1	TBA	

==== 2027 ====
Title	Release date	Prod. country	Camera system	Aspect ratio	Runtime min	Notes
Ice Age: Boiling Point	February 5, 2027	United States	Digital 3D	1.85:1	TBA	Also released in IMAX 3D and 4DX.
Star Wars	February 19, 2027	United States	Filmed in 2D	2.39:1	TBA	Originally released in 2D in 1977.; also released in IMAX 3D and 4DX.
Gatto	March 5, 2027	United States	Digital 3D	2.39:1	TBA	Also released in 4DX.
Sonic the Hedgehog 4	March 19, 2027	United States	Filmed in 2D	2.39:1	TBA	Also released in 4DX.
Godzilla x Kong: Supernova	March 26, 2027	United States	Filmed in 2D	2.39:1	TBA	Also released in 4DX.
Not Alone	April 16, 2027	United States	Digital 3D	1.85:1	TBA	Also released in 4DX.
A Place in Hell	April 23, 2027	United States	Filmed in 2D	1.85:1	TBA	Also released in 4DX.
The Legend of Zelda	April 30, 2027	United States	Filmed in 2D	2.39:1	TBA	Also released in 4DX.
Bad Fairies	May 21, 2027	United States	Rendered in 2D	2.39:1	TBA	Also released in 4DX.
Star Wars: Starfighter	May 28, 2027	United States	Filmed in 2D	2.39:1	TBA	Also released in 4DX.
How To Train Your Dragon 2	June 11, 2027	United States	Filmed in 2D	2.39:1	TBA	Also released in 4DX.
Spider-Man: Beyond the Spider-Verse	June 18, 2027	United States		2.39:1	TBA	Also released in 4DX.
Shrek 5	June 30, 2027	United States	Rendered in 2D	2.39:1	TBA	Also released in IMAX 3D and 4DX.
Man of Tomorrow	July 9, 2027	United States	Filmed in 2D	2.39:1	TBA	Also released in 4DX.
The Minecraft Movie Squared	July 23, 2027	United States	Filmed in 2D	2.39:1	TBA	Also released in 4DX.
The Bluey Movie	August 6, 2027	United States	Digital 3D	2.39:1	TBA	Also released 4DX.
Untitled Teenage Mutant Ninja Turtles: Mutant Mayhem sequel	August 13, 2027	United States	Rendered in 2D	2.39:1	TBA	Also released in 4DX.
The Haunting of Hotel Transylvania	October 8, 2027	United States	Rendered in 2D	2.39:1	TBA	Also released in 4DX.
Margie Claus	November 12, 2027	United States	Rendered in 2D	2.39:1	TBA	Also released in 4DX.
Frozen 3	November 24, 2027	United States	Digital 3D	2.39:1	TBA	Also released in 4DX.
Avengers: Secret Wars	December 17, 2027	United States	Filmed in 2D	2.39:1	TBA	Also released in 4DX.

==== 2028 ====
Title	Release date	Prod. country	Camera system	Aspect ratio	Runtime min	Notes
Ghost Market	March 10, 2028	United States	Digital 3D	2.39:1	TBA	Also released in 4DX.
Tangled	March 31, 2028	United States	Filmed in 2D	2.39:1	TBA	Also released in 4DX.
Ghost Rider	July 28, 2028	United States	Filmed in 2D	1.85:1	TBA	Also released in IMAX 3D and 4DX.

== Short films ==
Title	Release date	Prod. country	Camera system	Aspect ratio	Runtime min	Notes
Reminiscence	2008	France	SI2K and Mirror Rig	1.85:1	6	First French live-action short film.
Delusion 3D	2008	Germany			30	
Tokyo Mater	December 12, 2008	United States		1.85:1	5	Released with Bolt.
Partly Cloudy	May 29, 2009	United States		1.85:1	6	Released with Up.
Dead Boring 3D	2009	Australia	SI-2K and Speedwedge BS	1.85:1	17	
Grand Canyon: The Hidden Secrets	2009	United States	Filmed in IMAX 70mm	1.43:1	35	Originally released in 1984. Converted to 3D in 2009.
Lichtmond Moonlight	2010	Germany		1.78:1	50	3D re-release of 2010 film
Day & Night	June 18, 2010	United States		1.85:1	6	Released with Toy Story 3; blend of traditional ("2D") animation and computer animation.
Coyote Falls	July 30, 2010	United States		2.35:1	3	Released with Cats & Dogs: The Revenge of Kitty Galore.
Fur of Flying	September 24, 2010	United States		2.35:1	3	Released with Legend of the Guardians: The Owls of Ga'Hoole.
Rabid Rider	December 17, 2010	United States		2.35:1	3	Released with Yogi Bear.
Breathe 3D	2010	United Kingdom	Redcode RAW Dual HD	1.85:1	9	
FourPlay (3D)	2010	United Kingdom		1.77:1	3	Experimental animation
A to A (Kreis Wr.Neustadt)	2011	Austria	Arriflex 16SRII	1.66:1	6	parallel motion of camera creates stereo image
Bloodrop 3D	March 21, 2011	Russia	Arri Alexa and STEREOTEC 3D Midsize Rigs		7	3D rigs and on-set services by STEREOTEC 3D.
Star Tours – The Adventures Continue	May 20, 2011	United States				Theme park attraction
Toy Story Toons: Hawaiian Vacation	June 24, 2011	United States		1.85:1	5	Released with Cars 2.
Najwa Karam – Ma Fi Noum	July 25, 2011	Lebanon				Music video
Air Mater	November 1, 2011	United States		1.85:1	5	Released with Cars 2 3D
I Tawt I Taw a Puddy Tat	November 18, 2011	United States		2.35:1	4	Released with Happy Feet Two.
Cycle (3D)	2011	United Kingdom	Sony HXR-NX3D1	1.77:1	9	Supernatural drama. First Scottish live-action 3D short.
Zuma Vs. Filth (3D)	2011	Canada	Panasonic 3D-A1	1.85:1	12	Master's Thesis of Ryerson graduate Jacob D. Stein.
Lichtmond 2: Universe of Light	2012	Germany		1.78:1	52	
Tangled Ever After	January 13, 2012	United States		1.85:1	6	Released with Beauty and the Beast 3D.
Daffy's Rhapsody	February 10, 2012	United States		2.35:1	4	Released with Journey 2: The Mysterious Island.
Skeleton Girl	April 10, 2012	Canada	MoCo slider w/ Nikon D90	1.85:1	7	Canada's first stop-motion animated short in 3D.
La Luna	June 22, 2012	United States		2.39:1	7	Released with Brave.
Despicable Me Minion Mayhem	July 2, 2012	United States		1.85:1	8	HD 3D CGI-animated motion simulator ride.
The Longest Daycare	July 13, 2012	United States		1.85:1	5	Released with Ice Age: Continental Drift.
Toy Story Toons: Partysaurus Rex	September 14, 2012	United States		1.85:1	7	Released with Finding Nemo 3D and Monsters, Inc. 3D
Paperman	November 2, 2012	United States		1.85:1	7	Released with Wreck-It Ralph; blend of traditional ("2D") animation and computer animation. First stereoscopic 3D short film to win an Academy Award for Best Animated Short Film.
Out of Screen! 3D	December 6, 2012	Russia	Panasonic HDC SD800 Dual HD	1.77:1	20	Film-attraction
The Shadower 3D	2012	United States	AG-3DA1 Dual HD			Experimental art film
Ora	2012	Canada	Thermographically filmed		15	Experimental dance film.
ATM (3D)	2012	United Kingdom	Sony HXR-NX3D1	1.77:1	2	Romantic comedy.
The Collection (3D)	2012	United Kingdom	Sony HXR-NX3D1	1.77:1	6	Short horror film.
Hidden (3D)	2012	United Kingdom	Sony HXR-NX3D1	1.77:1	7	Police drama.
RECONNAISSANCE	2012	Austria	Panasonic GH3	1.78:1	5	
The Blue Umbrella	June 21, 2013	United States		2.39:1	6	Released with Monsters University.
Get a Horse!	November 27, 2013	United States		2.39:1	7	Released with Frozen; blend of traditional ("2D") animation and computer animation.
Kuku 3D	December 21, 2013	Slovakia	Panasonic Z10000	1.77:1	8	Short horror film.
Lichtmond 3: Days Of Eternity	2014	Germany		1.78:1	53	
Twelve Tales Told	2014	Austria	Found Footage	2.35:1	3	
Almost Home	March 7, 2014	United States		1.85:1	4	
Call Her Lotte	May 2014	Germany	Arri Alexa M and STEREOTEC 3D Rigs		17	3D rigs and on-set services by STEREOTEC 3D.
Feast	November 7, 2014	United States		2.39:1	6	Released with Big Hero 6; blend of traditional ("2D") animation and computer animation. Won Academy Award for Best Animated Short Film.
Lava	June 19, 2015	United States		2.39:1	7	Released with Inside Out.
Cosmic Scrat-tastrophe	November 6, 2015	United States		2.39:1	5	Released with The Peanuts Movie.
Sanjay's Super Team	November 25, 2015	United States		1.85:1	7	Released with The Good Dinosaur.
Lichtmond 4: The Journey	2016	Germany		1.78:1		
Piper	June 17, 2016	United States		1.85:1	6	Released with Finding Dory.
Mower Minions	July 8, 2016	United States		1.85:1	4	Released with The Secret Life of Pets.
The Master	September 23, 2016	United States		2.35:1	5	Released with Storks.
Inner Workings	November 23, 2016	United States		2.39:1	7	Released with Moana.
Lou	June 16, 2017	United States		1.85:1	6	Released with Cars 3.
Puppy!	July 28, 2017	United States		1.85:1	5	Released with The Emoji Movie.
Olaf's Frozen Adventure	November 22, 2017	United States		1.85:1	21	Released with Coco.
Walking In Your Footsteps	June 15, 2018	France	MinhiRig 3D	2:38	8	
Bao	June 15, 2018	United States		1.85:1	8	Released with Incredibles 2.
My Life Rehearsed in One Leg	September 1, 2018	Romania	Arri Alexa SXT and STEREOTEC 3D Midsize Rigs	1.85:1	60	
Michael Jackson's Thriller	September 21, 2018	United States		1.33:1	14	Originally released in 1983. Released with The House with a Clock in Its Walls for the first week of its North American IMAX run.
Cavalcade	January 26, 2019	Austria	Dual 35mm	1.37/1.66/1.85:1	5	
Hair Love	August 13, 2019	United States		2.39:1	5	Released with The Angry Birds Movie 2.
Marooned	September 27, 2019	United States		2.35:1	7	Released with Abominable.
Playdate with Destiny	March 6, 2020	United States		1.85:1	7	Released with Onward.
Jeanne	January 15, 2021	France	MinhiRig 3D	2.0	29	
Us Again	March 5, 2021	United States		2.39:1	7	Released with Raya and the Last Dragon.
Monster Pets	April 3, 2021	United States		1.85:1	6	Released with Various films in 3D.
Far from the Tree	November 24, 2021	United States		2.39:1	7	Released with Encanto.
Carl's Date	June 16, 2023	United States		1.85:1	8	Released with Elemental.
Mooned	December 22, 2023	United States		2.39:1	4	Released with Migration.
Revolving Rounds	August 16, 2024	Austria	Dual 36mm & Dual 16mm	1.37/1.66/1.85:1	11	
Teenage Mutant Ninja Turtles: Chrome Alone 2 – Lost in New Jersey	December 19, 2025	United States		2.39:1	7	Released with The SpongeBob Movie: Search for SquarePants.
Optimus Prime: Awakening	September 8, 2026	United States		2.39:1	12	Released with Transformers 40th Anniversary.
Daffy Season	November 6, 2026	United States		2.00:1	7	Released with The Cat in the Hat.

== TV series ==
Title	Release date	Prod. country	Camera system	Network	Episodes	Aspect ratio	Notes
Ice Age: A Mammoth Christmas	November 24, 2011	United States	Digital 3D	Fox	26	1.78:1	
Elf On The Shelf: An Elf's Story	November 26, 2011	United States	Digital 3D	CBS	27	1.78:1	
Doctor Who	2013	United Kingdom	Filmed in 3D	BBC	The Day of the Doctor	1.78:1	
Doctor Who	2014	United Kingdom	Filmed in 2D	BBC	Dark Water/Death in Heaven	1.78:1	Converted to 3D for theatrical and home media release.

== Cancelled releases ==
Title	Release date	Notes
Vincent	October 1, 1982	The short was planned to be converted to 3D and shown with the 2007 3D re-release of "The Nightmare Before Christmas", this conversion was abandoned due to production issues.
Independence Day	July 3, 1996	A 3D re-release was cancelled in 2013.
The Room	June 27, 2003	Wiseau first announced plans in April 2011 for a 3D version of The Room, scanned from the 35mm negative. Later, in 2018, he revealed his intentions to reshoot the film in 3D, citing cost-effectiveness reasons.
The Incredibles	November 5, 2004	In March 2014, Disney CEO and chairman Bob Iger announced that the film would be reformatted and re-released in 3D.
Happy Feet	November 17, 2006	The studio had hinted that a future IMAX 3D release was a possibility. However, Warner Bros., the film's production company, was on too tight of a budget to release Happy Feet in IMAX digital 3D. However an edited 12-minute version of the movie known as Happy Feet 4-D Experience was in 3D.
Glago's Guest	June 10, 2008	Animated in stereoscopic 3D, originally expected to be released theatrically preceding the Disney animated feature film Bolt. The short is believed not to have tested well with audiences, and the spot with Bolt was eventually taken by Pixar's Cars Toons short Tokyo Mater.
Transformers: Revenge of the Fallen	2009	Although screenwriter Roberto Orci suggested that the IMAX footage would be 3-D, Bay later said he found 3D too "gimmicky". Bay added that shooting in IMAX was easier than using IMAX stereoscopic 3-D cameras.
Planet 51	November 20, 2009	A 3D version of the movie was planned but was scrapped.
Sucker Punch	March 25, 2011	Warner Bros. announced earlier that Sucker Punch would be released in 3D format. Snyder describes the conversion into 3D as a completely different process. However, it was later announced that the film would not be presented in 3D. Snyder filmed a "Maximum Movie Mode" interactive Blu-ray commentary for the film's home media release.
Alvin and the Chipmunks: Chipwrecked	December 16, 2011	It was originally planned to be released in 3D, which never came to fruition.
Fantastic Four	August 7, 2015	Simon Kinberg stated that the film would be converted to 3D in post-production, but those plans were canceled, with Trank stating that he wanted "the viewing experience of Fantastic Four to remain as pure as possible for the audience, which means in 2D".
