= Dear, Don't Be Afraid =

- Poster
- Chinese: 亲，别怕之鬼宅凶灵
- Directed by: Yu Dange; Cao Anjun
- Starring: Du Yuchen; Ren Peng; Wang Qianhang; Yin Guiyong; Liu Jingyi; Han Xuantong
- Production companies: Wuhan Digisea Film Science and Technology; Beijing Shuzi Linghai Films Technology; Beijing Sailunwei Technoledge Development
- Distributed by: Aiweixiao Culture Media (Beijing); Guangdong Dadi Theatre Circuit; HG Entertainment; Zhejiang Star Lights Cinema Chain
- Release date: July 10, 2015
- Running time: 88 minutes
- Country: China
- Language: Mandarin
- Box office: CN¥2.26 million

Dear, Don't Be Afraid (Chinese: 亲，别怕 or Chinese: 亲，别怕之鬼宅凶灵) is a 2015 3D Chinese suspense horror thriller film directed by Yu Dange and Cao Anjun. The film was released on July 10, 2015.

== Cast ==
- Du Yuchen
- Ren Peng
- Wang Qianhang
- Yin Guiyong
- Liu Jingyi
- Han Xuantong

== Reception ==
The film earned CN¥2.261 million at the Chinese box office.
