= Fusion Camera System =

Digital movie camera system developed by James Cameron and Vince Pace

Fusion Camera System (a.k.a. Reality Camera System) is a digital movie camera system developed by James Cameron and Vince Pace. It was developed as a way to shoot features in stereoscopic 3D. The Fusion Camera System made first use of Sony HDC-F950 and later of Sony HDC-1500 HD cameras when they became available. The cameras are equipped with Fujinon lenses from Fujifilm.

== Films which used the Fusion Camera System ==
| Film | Release date | Notes |
|---|---|---|
| U2 3D | February 22, 2008 | Also released in IMAX 3D. |
| Journey to the Center of the Earth | July 11, 2008 | |
| Jonas Brothers: The 3D Concert Experience | February 27, 2009 | Also released in IMAX 3D. |
| The Final Destination | August 28, 2009 | |
| Avatar | December 18, 2009 | Released in IMAX 3D and re-released in IMAX 3D in 2010 and 2022. |
| Step Up 3D | August 6, 2010 | |
| Resident Evil: Afterlife | September 10, 2010 | Also released in IMAX 3D. |
| Yogi Bear | December 17, 2010 | |
| Tron: Legacy | December 17, 2010 | 40 minutes rendered in 1.78:1 aspect ratio in IMAX 3D and home release versions. |
| Sanctum | February 4, 2011 | Also released in IMAX 3D. |
| Pirates of the Caribbean: On Stranger Tides | May 20, 2011 | Also released in IMAX 3D. |
| Transformers: Dark of the Moon | June 29, 2011 | Also released in IMAX 3D. |
| Final Destination 5 | August 12, 2011 | Also released in IMAX 3D. |
| Spy Kids: All the Time in the World | August 19, 2011 | |
| Shark Night | September 2, 2011 | |
| Hugo | November 23, 2011 | |
| Journey 2: The Mysterious Island | February 10, 2012 | Also released in IMAX 3D. |
| Life of Pi | November 21, 2012 | Also released in IMAX 3D. |
| Cirque du Soleil: Worlds Away | December 21, 2012 | |
| Walking with Dinosaurs | December 20, 2013 | |
| 47 Ronin | December 25, 2013 | |
| 2.0 | November 29, 2018 | |
| Alita: Battle Angel | February 14, 2019 | Also released in IMAX 3D. |
