= Meg: Hell's Aquarium =

2009 science fiction novel by Steve Alten

- First edition
- Author: Steve Alten
- Language: English
- Series: Meg
- Genre: Science fiction horror
- Publisher: Headline Publishing Group
- Publication date: May 19, 2009
- Publication place: United States
- Media type: Print (paperback and hardback) and Audiobook
- Pages: 512 pp (paperback)
- ISBN: 1-2507-8605-3 (paperback)
- Preceded by: Meg: Primal Waters
- Followed by: Meg: Origins; Vostok; Meg: Nightstalkers

Meg: Hell's Aquarium (known digitally as Meg⁴: Hell's Aquarium) is a 2009 science fiction horror novel by American author Steve Alten. It is the sequel to Meg: Primal Waters and the fourth book in the MEG series. Described by Alten as "the pinnacle of the series", the novel continues the adventure of Jonas Taylor and his family, as his son David, hired as a handler for two megalodons (megs) being sold to a royal prince of Dubai, is tricked into overseeing an expedition to capture a Liopleurodon (Lio) from the remains of the Panthalassa, while Jonas, Terry, and Dani deal with a terrorist group seeking to unleash the remaining megs unto the oceans of the world. The novel's audiobook was narrated by Keith Szarabajka, with Lana Wood, a self-professed fan of the series, licensing her image for Alten to write in a fictionalised version of herself, promoting the novel then-after, Alten attributing the novel's delay to the development hell of The Meg.

A prequel novella, titled Meg: Origins, was released in 2011, a crossover sequel with the Alten's The Loch series, Vostok, was released in 2015, and a direct sequel novel, titled Meg: Nightstalkers, was released in 2016.

== Plot summary ==
Hidden beneath the primordial crust of the Philippine Sea Plate, the most unexplored realm on the planet, is discovered the remains of the Panthalassa, a secret vast and isolated ocean dating back 220 million years inhabited by nightmarish sea creatures long believed extinct. Four years since the birth of the megalodon (meg) Angel's new litter of pups in Meg: Primal Waters, they have grown far too numerous and aggressive to keep in one pen of California's Tanaka Institute, Monterey, and a Dubai royal prince seeking to build the largest aquarium in the world seeks to purchase two of the "runts" (named after Belle Gunness)―if Jonas Taylor's twenty-one year-old son, David, will be their handler, under Captain Timon Singh. Jonas reluctantly agrees, and David heads off to Dubai for "the summer of his life", unaware that he is being set up to lead an expedition that will hunt down and capture the most dangerous creature ever to inhabit the Earth.

== Reception ==
Critical reception for Hell's Aquarium was mixed-to-positive, meeting with praise from most reviewers. Publishers Weekly criticised the novel for "recycl[ing] plot lines from earlier books in the series", calling the characters' "numerous close encounters with death in setups [to] be fresh only to those who haven't read the three previous Meg books". Bloody Flicks called the novel "a riveting tale that feels fresh but still part of the overall series", with its "two storylines help[ing] to break things up and add some tension to more intense scenes as both our heroes are put in perilous situations. Alten as always goes into lots (sometimes too much) detail about the megalodons and other beasts that debut in this novel, but you can’t doubt his attention to detail which borders on fascinating at times", concluding to call the novel "a superior sequel to its predecessor [which] will certainly whet the appetite of fans looking forward to [the film adaptation]. Creature From the Black Lagoon called Hell’s Aquarium "a fast, exciting ride [which] opens up the series for even more creatures [besides megs] to make appearances", calling it "one of the best books in the series".

== Sequel ==
A prequel novella, Meg: Origins, was released in 2011, while a crossover sequel with the Alten's The Loch series, Vostok, was released in 2015, and a direct sequel novel "pick[ing] up right where Hell's Aquarium left off", Meg: Nightstalkers, was released in 2016.

== Adaptation ==
Following first interest expressed by Steve Alten to a film adaptation of Hell's Aquarium to follow the then-in-development hell The Meg in December 2015, in April 2019, Lorenzo di Bonaventura revealed that the Meg 2: The Trench film and subsequent sequels would take influence from Hell's Aquarium and later Meg novels instead of solely The Trench on its own, with director Ben Wheatley expressing interest in Meg 3 also exploring aspects of the novel in July 2023.

== See also ==
- Meg: A Novel of Deep Terror
- List of underwater science fiction works
