= List of underwater science fiction works =

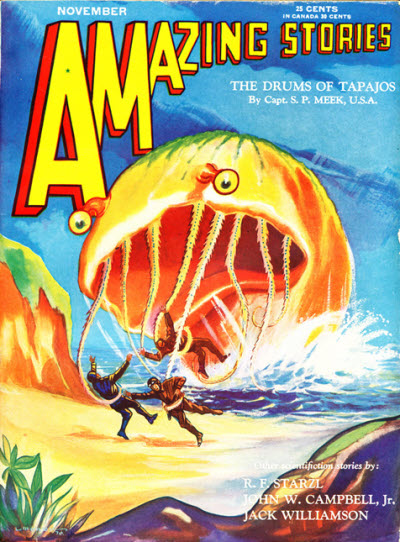
The magazine cover of Amazing Stories vol. 5 #8 (November 1930). Art by Leo Morey.

This is a collection of science fiction novels, comic books, films, television series and video games that take place either partially or primarily underwater. They prominently feature maritime and underwater environments, or other underwater aspects from the nautical fiction genre, as in Jules Verne's classic 1870 novel Twenty Thousand Leagues Under the Seas.

== Literature ==
- Twenty Thousand Leagues Under the Seas by Jules Verne (1870)
- The Mysterious Island by Jules Verne (1875)
- "In the Abyss" by H. G. Wells (1896 short story)
- Master of the World by Jules Verne (1904)
- The Scarlet Empire by David M. Parry (1906)
- Der Tunnel by Bernhard Kellermann (1913)
- Beyond Thirty by Edgar Rice Burroughs (1916)
- The Sunken World by Stanton A Coblentz (1928)
- The Maracot Deep by Arthur Conan Doyle (1929)
- Attack from Atlantis by Lester del Rey (1953)
- The Deep Range by Arthur C. Clarke (1953 short story; 1957 novel)
- The Kraken Wakes by John Wyndham (1953)
- The Dragon in the Sea by Frank Herbert (1956)
- Dolphin Island by Arthur C. Clarke (1963)
- The Drowned World by J. G. Ballard (1966)
- The Watch Below by James White (1966)
- Tunnel Through the Deeps by Harry Harrison (1972)
- The Godwhale by T. J. Bass (1974)
- The Illuminatus! Trilogy by Robert Anton Wilson and Robert Shea (1975)
- Startide Rising by David Brin (1983)
- Deep Wizardry by Diane Duane (1985)
- Sphere by Michael Crichton (1987)
- Rocheworld by Robert L. Forward (1990)
- Undersea Trilogy by Frederik Pohl and Jack Williamson (1992, omnibus edition)
- Animorphs by K.A. Applegate (1996–2001; only books 4, 15, 27, and 36)
- Rifters Trilogy by Peter Watts (1999-2004)
- Meg: A Novel of Deep Terror by Steve Alten (1997)
- The Trench by Steve Alten (1999)
- Goliath by Steve Alten (2002)
- The Scar by China Mieville (2002)
- Meg: Primal Waters by Steve Alten (2004)
- The Swarm by Frank Schätzing (2004)
- Camouflage by Joe Haldeman (2004)
- The Loch by Steve Alten (2005)
- Meg: Hell's Aquarium by Steve Alten (2009)
- Low comics series by Rick Remender and Greg Rocchini (2014–2020)
- Meg: Nightstalkers by Steve Alten (2016)
- Meg: Generations by Steve Alten (2018)
- Daughter of the Deep by Rick Riordan (2021)

== Films ==
- The Impossible Voyage (1904)
- Under the Seas (1907)
- The Tunnel (1915)
- 20,000 Leagues Under the Sea (1916)
- The Mysterious Island (1929)
- Der Tunnel (1933)
- Le Tunnel (1933)
- The Tunnel (1935)
- 20,000 Leagues Under the Sea (1954)
- It Came from Beneath the Sea (1955)
- Invention for Destruction (1958)
- The Atomic Submarine (1959)
- On the Beach (1959)
- Voyage to the Bottom of the Sea (1961)
- Atragon (1963)
- City Under the Sea (1965)
- Around the World Under the Sea (1966)
- Destination Inner Space (1966)
- Captain Nemo and the Underwater City (1969)
- Hello Down There (1969)
- Latitude Zero (1969)
- City Beneath the Sea (1971)
- The Neptune Factor (1973)
- Warlords of Atlantis (1978)
- The Amazing Captain Nemo (1978)
- 20,000 Leagues Under the Sea (1985)
- The Abyss (1989)
- DeepStar Six (1989)
- Leviathan (1989)
- Lords of the Deep (1989)
- The Rift (1990)
- Waterworld (1995)
- 20,000 Leagues Under the Sea (1997, Hallmark)
- Sphere (1998)
- Deep Blue Sea (1999)
- A.I. Artificial Intelligence (2001)
- Atlantis: The Lost Empire (2001, animated)
- Deep Shock (2003)
- Thunderbirds (2004)
- Journey 2: The Mysterious Island (2012)
- Pacific Rim (2013)
- Justice League: Throne of Atlantis (2015, animated)
- Deep (2017, animated)
- Deep Blue Sea 2 (2018)
- Aquaman (2018)
- Lego DC Comics Super Heroes: Aquaman – Rage of Atlantis (2018, animated)
- DC Super Hero Girls: Legends of Atlantis (2018, animated)
- The Meg (2018), based on the Steve Alten novel series
- Deep Blue Sea 3 (2020)
- Underwater (2020)
- Avatar: The Way of Water (2022)
- Black Panther: Wakanda Forever (2022)
- The Black Demon (2023)
- Meg 2: The Trench (2023)
- Aquaman and the Lost Kingdom (2023)
- Avatar: Fire and Ash (2025)
- Iron Lung (2026)

== Television ==
- Tales of Adventure (1952)
- Stingray (1964 series)
- Voyage to the Bottom of the Sea (1964–1968 series)
- Captain Fathom (1965)
- Sealab 2020 (1972 series)
- Captain Nemo (1975 miniseries)
- The Undersea Adventures of Captain Nemo (1975)
- Man from Atlantis (1977–1978 series)
- The Return of Captain Nemo (1978)
- Nadia: The Secret of Blue Water (1990–1991 series)
- Willy Fog 2 (1993)
- seaQuest DSV (1993–1996 series, episodes)
- Ocean Girl (1994–1997 series, episodes)
- 20,000 Leagues Under the Sea (1997 miniseries)
- The New Adventures of Ocean Girl (2000 series)
- Sealab 2021 (2000–2005 series, episodes)
- Daphne in the Brilliant Blue (2004)
- The Deep (2010 miniseries)
- The Deep (2015–2022 series)
- Thunderbirds Are Go (2015–2020 series)
- Yakamoz S-245 (2022)
- Nautilus (2024)
- The War Between the Land and the Sea (2025 miniseries)

== Play ==
- Journey Through the Impossible (1882)

== Video games ==
- Ecco the Dolphin franchise (1992–2000)
- Subwar 2050 (1993)
- seaQuest DSV (1994)
- X-COM: Terror from the Deep (1995)
- Archimedean Dynasty (1996)
- Deadly Tide (1996)
- Sub Culture (1997)
- The Abyss: Incident at Europa (1998)
- Deep Fear (1998)
- Submarine Titans (2000)
- AquaNox franchise (2001–2020)
- The Secret of the Nautilus (2002)
- Ever 17: The Out of Infinity (2002)
- BioShock (2007)
- BioShock 2 (2010)
- BioShock Infinite: Burial at Sea (2013–14)
- SOMA (2015)
- Subnautica (2018)
- In Other Waters (2020)
- Subnautica: Below Zero (2021)
- Iron Lung (2022)
- Barotrauma (2023)
- Under the Waves (2023)
- Still Wakes the Deep: Siren's Rest (2025)
- Subnautica 2 (2026)

== Toys ==
- Lego Aquazone (1995–1998)
- Lego Aqua Raiders (2007–08)
- Lego Atlantis (2010–11)

== See also ==
- Nautical fiction
- Adaptations of Twenty Thousand Leagues Under the Seas
- Captain Nemo, Jules Verne character
- Nautilus, Verne's fictional submarine
- Atlantis in popular culture
- Aquaman, a DC Comics character
  - Aquaman in other media
- Mermaids in popular culture
