= Meg: A Novel of Deep Terror =

Science-fiction horror novel by Steve Alten

- First edition
- Author: Steve Alten
- Language: English
- Genre: Science fiction horror
- Publisher: Headline Publishing Group (United Kingdom); Doubleday (United States)
- Publication date: July 1997
- Publication place: United States
- Media type: Print (paperback and hardback)
- Pages: 337 pp (paperback)
- ISBN: 0-9761659-1-0 (paperback)
- OCLC: 64574002
- LC Class: CPB Box no. 2426 vol. 1
- Followed by: The Trench

Meg: A Novel of Deep Terror is a 1997 science fiction horror novel by American author Steve Alten, and the first in the MEG series of novels. The novel follows the underwater adventures of a Navy deep-sea diver named Jonas Taylor.

In 2018, a film adaptation titled The Meg was released. A revised and expanded version of the novel (also containing the prequel Meg: Origins) was also released to coincide with the film's debut. A graphic novel adaptation was also released in 2019 by Steve Alten, J. S. Earls, and Mike Miller.

== Plot (expanded version) ==
In the prologue, during the Late Cretaceous Period, a Tyrannosaurus rex stumbles into the ocean while pursuing a herd of Shantungosaurus and is attacked and devoured by a 60 ft (18 m), 20 t (44,000 lb) megalodon ("meg"). The sequence is part of a slideshow by Jonas Taylor, a paleontologist and marine biologist, for his presentation on megalodons.

Jonas works in the Mariana Trench with the United States Navy. His mission is top secret and involves the study of hydrogen nodules to solve future energy crises using nuclear fission. However, after his third dive in 8 days, he is exhausted and is checked out by the Navy's top medical officer, Doctor Heller. While on the dive, Jonas watches in horror as a meg rises from the depths. Jonas panics, surfaces quickly, and escapes, causing the death of the scientists as a result. The Navy does not believe his claims, labeling him a madman and ruining his career while covering up Doctor Heller's misjudgment. Years later, Jonas still tries to prove that what he saw was real. His actions have also led Jonas to push away his estranged and separated wife, Maggie, and lead to her having an affair with his billionaire friend, Bud Harris. He is later approached by an old friend, marine biologist Masao Tanaka, who lost a remote submersible that monitors seismic activity in the Mariana Trench and hopes to retrieve it. Seeing this as an opportunity to prove that the meg still exists, Jonas agrees to help Tanaka over the objection of Tanaka's daughter, Terry.

At the Trench, Jonas and Tanaka's son, DJ, dive in small submersibles. A male meg rises from the depths and kills DJ despite Jonas' attempts to distract it. Jonas watches in horror as the meg is trapped in the steel cables connecting DJ's sub to the ship. As the meg is pulled to the surface, having its organs and flesh ripped apart by the cables, Jonas watches a much larger female meg, attracted by the struggles of her dying mate, rise out of the Trench. She attacks the male and feeds on him as he is pulled to the surface, his heated blood protecting her from the cold water layer that has previously kept them from entering the ocean.

Jonas and Tanaka are worried about the imbalance in the ocean's ecosystem that might result from a meg returning after an absence of millions of years as they try to track it down. The female surfaces off the coast of Maui and kills several surfers. She also attacks a helicopter that Jonas uses at night after discovering that thousands of years of living in the depths of the Trench has led the sharks to develop bioluminescent hides and destroys a military submarine led by Taylor's commanding officer from his time in the Navy.

Jonas and Tanaka realize that the meg is pregnant and want to capture her before she gives birth. Maggie seizes this opportunity to advance her career and films the shark from within a cage as it swims to California to give birth. During her sojourn north, the shark gives birth to three pups, one of which she devours and the second of which is killed by orcas. At the Farallon Islands, Maggie uses a dead whale to attract the shark, successfully filming it, but inadvertently causes it to attack her cage. Despite Jonas's best efforts to stop the shark, the creature devours Maggie.

Jonas and Tanaka track down the female after she attacks a whale-watching boat shortly after. After tranquilizing the shark and capturing her, Taylor's vengeful superiors and Maggie's lover try to kill it with a homemade depth charge, causing the creature to awaken and rampage, killing dozens of witnesses and bystanders, including Taylor's superiors themselves. Jonas pilots a submersible down the meg's throat and into her stomach. There, he uses the hydrogen supply from his sub to ignite the nearby whale blubber, burning the meg from the inside out. After escaping from his pod, Jonas is rescued by Terry and a passing tourist vessel. Jonas and Tanaka's remaining crew capture the surviving meg pup as Jonas is taken away to be treated for decompression sickness. They are excited about the opportunity to study this believed-extinct creature. It is later named Angel: The Angel of Death.

== Sequels ==
The novel spawned a series with these sequels:

- The Trench (1999)
- Meg: Primal Waters (2004)
- Meg: Hell's Aquarium (2009)
- Meg: Origins (2011)
- Meg: Nightstalkers (2016)
- Meg: Generations (2020)
- Meg: Purgatory (2022)

Additionally, a crossover novel, Vostok, described as a "sequel to The Loch and prequel to Meg: Nightstalkers", was released in 2015.

== Film ==
A film based on the novel had been mired in development hell since 1997. At one point, reports surfaced that the film was slated for a 2008 release date and was to be made by New Line Cinema, which had recently bought the rights from Alten. Names that were attached to the project included Jan de Bont and Guillermo del Toro. However, in July 2007, New Line canceled the production. Steve Alten had said that once his relationship with New Line was finally over, he would be taking the property elsewhere. The rights eventually reverted to Alten, but the film remained in development hell.

In 2011, Alten commented on his sparsely updated website. Along with the announcement that he would be releasing a prequel novella titled Meg: Origins, Alten indicated that he was holding back the release of his next entry in the series Meg: Night Stalkers to time with the release of the film. On January 2, 2015, Alten appeared on Coast to Coast AM radio with George Noory and said that a film based on Meg was back on track.

On June 16, 2015, Eli Roth was announced to direct the film adaptation. He left the project due to creative differences. On March 3, 2016, ComingSoon.net reported that director Jon Turteltaub (National Treasure) has since been in talks to helm the movie adaptation of Steve Alten's Meg.

On April 14, 2016, various media outlets reported that action star Jason Statham would be taking the lead role of Jonas Taylor in the upcoming film. In July 2016, Jessica McNamee and Ruby Rose also joined the cast of the film.

The film was initially due to be released on March 2, 2018, but was ultimately released on August 10, 2018. The novel's opening scene, in which a T. rex is eaten by a meg during the Cretaceous period, was ultimately adapted to the science fiction action film Meg 2: The Trench, released on August 4, 2023.

== See also ==
- List of underwater science fiction works
