= Aquanaut (disambiguation) =

An aquanaut is a diver who remains at depth underwater for longer than 24 hours.

Aquanaut may also refer to:

- The Aquanauts, a 1960–1961 American adventure TV series
- Aquanauts (film), a 1979 Soviet science fiction film
- Lego Aquazone, Lego toys
