= Meg: Primal Waters =

2004 science fiction novel by Steve Alten

- First edition
- Author: Steve Alten
- Language: English
- Series: Meg
- Genre: Science fiction horror
- Publisher: Headline Publishing Group
- Publication date: July 2004
- Publication place: United States
- Media type: Print (paperback and hardback) and Audiobook
- Pages: 361 pp (paperback)
- ISBN: 0-7653-0890-8 (paperback)
- OCLC: 1036685396
- Preceded by: The Trench: Meg 2
- Followed by: Meg: Hell's Aquarium

Meg: Primal Waters (known digitally as Meg³: Primal Waters) is a 2004 science fiction horror novel by American author Steve Alten. It is the sequel to The Trench: Meg 2 and the third book in the MEG series. The novel continues the adventure of Jonas Taylor, now a middle-aged father of two, eighteen years after the previous novel, as he is hired as a consultant for the reality television series Daredevils, which comes to be plagued by megalodons (megs). The novel's audiobook was narrated by Keith Szarabajka.

A sequel, titled Meg: Hell's Aquarium, was released in 2009.

== Plot summary ==
18 years after the events of the previous novel, in 2019, Jonas Taylor is now living in Tampa, Florida with his wife Terry and two children. Overwhelmed with past due bills and his rebellious teenage daughter Danielle and suffering from a mid-life crisis, Jonas accepts a job as a consultant from Hollywood television producers on the top-rated reality television series Daredevils, providing his "expert commentary" on a contest being held in the South Pacific Ocean. As Jonas proceeds to the series' set aboard a Spanish galleon with Danielle, as his wife Terry investigates beached whales off of Vancouver Island, both learned they have entered the latest feeding zones of megalodons (megs), as Angel has been lured to surface waters from the trench and is being pursued by nefarious individuals. Terry attempts to capture the meg responsible for the whale beachings, while her and Jonas' son David attempts to capture the real Angel along with Mac. Meanwhile, on the set of Daredevils, Jonas' archenemy Michael Maren plans to get revenge on Jonas using his pet meg "Scarface", Angel's son, whose brother is the meg Terry is pursuing (both born at the conclusion of the previous book). Ultimately, Jonas tricks Michael into feeding himself to Scarface, while Megalodon returns to the trench with his dead master's remains, where-in a much larger being is revealed to reside, while the pregnant Angel is returned to the Institute.

== Reception ==
Critical reception for Primal Waters was positive, meeting with praise from most reviewers. Publishers Weekly noted "the novelty of an aging action hero [to have added] general interest" to the novel's narrative, along with plot points fans of the series would gleefully "devour".

Writers Write called Primal Waters Steve Alten's "best novel yet", doing "a great job of creating fully-realized and interesting characters who are put into horrifying situations" for its audience of "those that love a good shark attack scene [with] enough action and shark attacks for three books here; the pace is absolutely relentless. Alten tap[ping] right into the primal terror that anyone with a grain of sense feels when a shark the size of a house is heading your way. Neatly woven into the plot [with] commentary on everything from baseball, family dynamics [to] ocean ecology".

LIT Reactor, comparing the first novel to Primal Waters, called "the energy [of Primal Waters to be] propulsive and the [premise as] undeniably compelling", with the characterisation of Jonas being "undeniably compelling [and] terse, grizzly antihero.

CBS Sports criticised Alten's decision to have a fictionalised version of Pat Burrell break Barry Bonds' home run record over the course of Primal Waters.

In a 2018 retrospective of the franchise, Bernard "The Klute" Schober of Nerdvana Media praised Primal Waters as their "favorite" of the six Meg novels then-published.

== Sequel ==
A sequel, Meg: Hell's Aquarium, was released in 2009.

== Adaptation ==
In April 2019, Lorenzo di Bonaventura revealed that the Meg 2: The Trench film and subsequent sequels would take influence from Primal Water and later Meg novels instead of solely The Trench on its own, with director Ben Wheatley in July 2023 expressing interest in Meg 3 also exploring aspects of the novel.

== See also ==
- Meg: A Novel of Deep Terror
- List of underwater science fiction works
