= Meg: Nightstalkers =

2016 science fiction novel by Steve Alten

- First edition
- Author: Steve Alten
- Language: English
- Series: Meg
- Genre: Science fiction horror
- Publisher: Headline Publishing Group
- Publication date: June 14, 2016
- Publication place: United States
- Media type: Print (paperback and hardback) and Audiobook
- Pages: 448 pp (paperback)
- ISBN: 978-0-7653-8796-7 (paperback)
- Preceded by: Meg: Hell's Aquarium; Vostok
- Followed by: Meg: Generations

Meg: Nightstalkers (known digitally as Meg⁵: Nightstalkers) is a 2016 science fiction horror novel by American author Steve Alten. It is the sequel to Vostok and Meg: Hell's Aquarium, and the fifth book in the MEG series. Continuing the adventures of Jonas Taylor and his family following the cliffhanger ending of the previous novel, as Jonas and his best friend Mac search for two rogue megalodons (megs), while Jonas' son David continues working with the royal prince of Dubai to search for the Liopleurodon that killed his girlfriend, the novel also continues the premise Meg series as being set in the same fictional universe as Alten's The Loch established in the preceding 2015 crossover novel Vostok, with the return of Zachary Wallace. The novel's audiobook was narrated by Keith Szarabajka, with Erik Hollander designing the cover.

A sequel, titled Meg: Generations, was released in 2018.

== Plot summary ==
Picking up immediately where Meg: Hell's Aquarium left off, Bela and Lizzy, the dominant Megalodon siblings from Angel's brood, have escaped the Tanaka Institute to roam the Salish Sea in British Columbia. While Jonas Taylor and his friend Mac attempt to either recapture or kill the sisters, Jonas' son, David, embarks on his own adventure, motivated by revenge. Having witnessed his girlfriend's gruesome death, David has joined a Dubai Prince's ocean expedition, tracking the 120-foot, hundred-ton Liopleurodon that escaped from the Panthalassa Sea. Haunted by night terrors, David repeatedly risks his life to lure the Lio and other prehistoric sea creatures into the fleet's nets, while battling his own suicidal demons.

== Reception ==
Critical reception for Nightstalkers was mixed-to-positive, meeting with praise from most reviewers. Publishers Weekly criticised the novel for "continu[ing] to be less than careful about scientific details (centipedes aren't insects) and usage (the liopleurodon at one point sweeps prey into its “vacuous gullet”) while still serving as "fun" for fans of Jaws". The BiblioSanctum lauded the "laughably absurd" plot of the novel as "a helluva fun time", felling like a "book version" of creature features.

Wicked Horror praised the novel as "another astounding adventure that makes for perfect summer reading", calling it to have been "wonderful to witness just how much the world of MEG has grown with each new entry. Steve Alten know[ing] how to continually raise the stakes for our favorite characters by putting them in these unbelievably terrifying situations, so much so that I was always afraid that one of them might not make it out alive this time.", in addition to complimenting the novel's crossover with Alten's The Loch in the return of Zachary Wallace.

BioGamer Girl complimented "Steve Alten [for] once again [having] delivered an action-packed storyline written in such a colorfully vivid way that every word seems to pop off the pages. The well-developed characters manag[ing] to draw you in and keep you reading [and] vividly narrated in such a way that anyone that picks it up can jump into the exquisitely written pages and feel like they are a part of the story", concluding that "All-in-all, if you have been wanting an action-packed story full of monsters and excitement then look no further with MEG: Nightstalkers."

== Sequel ==
A sequel, Meg: Generations, was released in 2018.

== See also ==
- Meg: A Novel of Deep Terror
- List of underwater science fiction works
