= Legend Films =

American home video distributor

Legend Films, Inc.
- Company type: Private
- Industry: Film and television
- Founded: August 2001
- Founder: Barry B. Sandrew
- Headquarters: San Diego, California, United States
- Key people: Brian Robertson, CEO; Barry B. Sandrew, CCO/CTO; Ian Gessel, President; Thomas Sinnott, COO; Matt Akey, Executive Producer; Jared Sandrew, Creative Officer/VFX Supervisor; Tony Baldridge, VFX Supervisor; Matt DeJohn, VFX Supervisor
- Products: Library of colorized and restored films and RiffTrax audio commentaries
- Services: 3D conversion of new release and catalog feature films, trailers, and commercials
- Number of employees: 290
- Website: legendfilms.com

Legend Films is a San Diego–based company founded in August 2001 which originally provided restoration and colorization of classic black-and-white films for TV, theatrical and home video release via Legend Films Home Entertainment Distribution. They also distributed RiffTrax until it was spun off on July 3, 2012. RiffTrax is a business from the stars of Mystery Science Theater 3000 offering humorous audio commentaries on MP3 files, DVDs and Blu-rays for titles in the Legend Films library.

Sister company Legend3D specializes in the conversion of feature films, both new release and catalog titles, and commercials from their native 2D format into 3-D film format utilizing proprietary technology and software. They performed 3D conversion on a number of high-profile projects including feature film work for Disney, DreamWorks Animation, Warner Bros. and Sony Pictures Imageworks, as well as commercial work for HP, Fanta, New Balance and M&M/Mars, television work on television show Chuck and for MTV and special feature work for Michael Jackson's "This Is It" concerts.

== Company history ==
Legend Films' founder, Barry Sandrew, Ph.D. pioneered and patented the first all-digital colorization technology in 1987 and then reinvented the process in 2000 by patenting the most advanced colorization technology that largely automates the process (Image sequence enhancement system and method – US Patent 7181081 [12]). Some of the works being colorized by Legend are films that have fallen into the public domain and are now copyrighted only in their colorized form in the United States, while their original copyright on the black-and-white version is still in force. Other movies in the Legend Films library are titles color produced in revenue sharing partnerships with the original copyright holder. Legend has colorized films owned by 20th Century Fox, Sony Pictures Entertainment, Universal Pictures and Paramount Home Entertainment. In less than three years, Legend Films has restored and colorized over 100 feature films in high definition or film resolution.

In 2006, comedian and former Mystery Science Theater 3000 host Michael J. Nelson was appointed Chief Content Producer and established the RiffTrax business.

Legend Films now does most of its work in Carlsbad, California, and Patna, India.

== Notable releases ==
Legend Films has collaborated with Shirley Temple, Jane Russell, Terry Moore and Ray Harryhausen on independent releases. A colorized version of Holiday Inn was met by positive response from the family of Bing Crosby.

On April 20, 2004, Legend Films released a colorized version of Reefer Madness featuring intentionally unrealistic color schemes, playing up on the film's camp appreciation. A colorized version of Plan 9 from Outer Space was screened at the Castro Theatre in San Francisco.

With the cooperation of director Richard Elfman, Legend released a colorized version of the 1982 film Forbidden Zone on July 29, 2008. This version was also made available online at Rifftrax, however without any commentary as Rifftrax creative felt the film was weird enough.

In December 2008, it was announced that Legend will release a colorized 3-D version of Night of the Living Dead co-produced by PassmoreLab. The 3-D version will receive a full theatrical release in Europe, and a limited theatrical release in the United States. According to Barry Sandrew, the film was the first entirely live action 2-D film to be converted to 3-D.

In late 2008, Legend colorized part 3 of the Doctor Who story Planet of the Daleks; the remaining episodes exist in color, but part 3 was wiped and only a black-and-white film version remained. The resultant colorized footage was combined with color information that was recovered from the Chroma Crawl color recovery process, and was released on DVD in November 2009.

According to founder Barry Sandrew, Legend Films does not plan to colorize titles that were shot in black-and-white for artistic purposes, unless the original creators of the works participated in the color design.

In 2021, Legend released an abridged version of the film It's a Wonderful Life which omitted the "Potterville" sequence for copyright reasons. This version drew criticism for omitting such a pivotal part of the film.

== See also ==
- Film preservation
- Mystery Science Theater 3000
- Cult film
