= Goliath (Alten novel) =

2002 novel by Steve Alten

- First edition
- Author: Steve Alten
- Language: English
- Genre: Science fiction
- Publisher: Forge Books
- Publication date: July 1, 2002
- Publication place: United States
- Media type: book
- Pages: 512
- ISBN: 0765340240

Goliath is a science fiction novel by Steve Alten. It was released on July 1, 2002.

== Plot summary ==
The story chronicles ex-Army Ranger Gunnar Wolfe escaping from being falsely imprisoned after attempting to wipe data from a computer in efforts to construct a new futuristic type of military submarine called Goliath. The Chinese government, however, has been building a version of the submarine using stolen plans. The Chinese craft is stolen by Simon Covah, the antagonist who wants to use it as leverage over the world's governments and the CIA. Goliath is also equipped with an artificial intelligence program known as SORCERESS.

== See also ==
- List of underwater science fiction works
