= Sphere (novel) =

1987 novel by Michael Crichton

- First edition cover
- Author: Michael Crichton
- Language: English
- Genre: Science fiction
- Publisher: Knopf
- Publication date: May 12, 1987
- Publication place: United States
- Media type: Print (hardcover)
- Pages: 385
- ISBN: 0-394-56110-4
- OCLC: 15198625
- Dewey Decimal: 813/.54 19
- LC Class: PS3553.R48 S6 1987
- Preceded by: Congo
- Followed by: Jurassic Park

Sphere is a 1987 novel by Michael Crichton, his sixth novel under his own name and his sixteenth overall. It was adapted into the film Sphere in 1998.

The story follows Norman Johnson, a psychologist engaged by the United States Navy, who joins a team of scientists assembled to examine a spacecraft of unknown origin discovered on the bottom of the Pacific Ocean. The novel begins as a science fiction story but quickly transforms into a psychological thriller, developing into an exploration of the nature of the human imagination.

== Plot summary ==
A group of scientists (psychologist Norman Johnson, mathematician Harry Adams, zoologist Beth Halpern, astrophysicist Ted Fielding, and marine biologist Arthur Levine), along with U.S. Navy personnel, travel to a deep sea habitat at the bottom of the Pacific Ocean, where a 1/2 mile (800 m) long spacecraft has been discovered.

During the descent, Levine becomes claustrophobic and is returned to the surface. The other scientists arrive safely at Habitat DH-8. After their arrival and subsequent pressurization to the habitat's exotic-gas environment, the Navy sends a robot to enter the spacecraft first, which locates and opens a panel near the spacecraft door.

As the robot's cameras focus on the opened panel, labels in English indicate the spacecraft is actually a U.S. spacecraft constructed in the future and sent through time, appearing on the seabed at least 300 years before its creation. The robot is unable to open a hatch leading further inside, forcing the team to don pressure suits and explore the spacecraft. In a large cargo hold, the team discovers a mysterious spherical object that is clearly of extra-terrestrial origin.

Reasoning the ship's future builders were apparently unaware that it had already been found in their past, Adams becomes convinced that the team will not survive to report their discovery. Remaining behind after the rest of the team returns to the habitat, Adams succeeds in opening and entering the sphere. Meanwhile, on the surface, a Pacific cyclone forces the supporting Naval ships to evacuate, trapping and isolating the scientists on the ocean floor for five days. Adams is found and returned to the DH-8 Habitat where he awakens with a terrible headache and little-to-no memory of how he opened the sphere or what occurred while he was inside. Immediately afterwards, the team is contacted by an intelligent, seemingly friendly alien entity that calls itself "Jerry".

At first, Jerry communicates with the scientists using a numeric code transmitted to the habitat's computer. While the team struggles to communicate with Jerry, increasingly bizarre and deadly events occur, including the appearance of impossible sea creatures that Halpern claims cannot exist (such as shrimp with no digestive organs), confirmed when Jerry informs them he is "manifesting" the creatures.

At this point, members of the team are killed during attacks by a giant squid, and the dwindling band of survivors struggle in their dealings with the unthinkably powerful, childlike, and temperamental alien entity. Johnson realizes he must use psychology to keep the remaining survivors (Johnson, Adams, and Halpern) alive.

After re-translating the original code, Johnson realizes by transposition the entity's name is "Harry". Johnson hypothesizes that the sphere is an object which allows a person's subconscious thoughts to manifest in reality, and Harry Adams has acquired the power through entering it. This is confirmed by his childhood fear of squid, especially the giant squid in the novel Twenty Thousand Leagues Under the Seas, manifesting in the form of a vast number of small squid and later a giant squid that attacks the DH-8 Habitat.

Johnson and Halpern sedate Adams and wait for contact to be re-established with the surface, but the manifestations continue. Halpern accuses Johnson of having entered the sphere and gaining access to the power. When he is unable to recall this incident, Johnson comes close to yielding, until he watches a security video of Halpern entering the sphere herself. Rejecting the notion, Halpern decides that Johnson is an imminent threat and defends herself by planting powerful explosives around the spacecraft and habitat, and then attempts to suffocate Johnson by manipulating the habitat's life-support system.

Escaping from the habitat, Johnson goes to the spacecraft and enters the presence of the sphere, then the sphere itself. Inside the sphere, he finds a large sea of translucent "foam," and has a conversation in his thoughts with some sort of entity that speaks in cryptic riddles, who eventually tells Johnson that the greatest power humans possess is the ability to imagine things. After leaving the sphere, Johnson decides to escape using the submarine docked at Habitat DH-7, a nearby habitat for Navy personnel, but cannot abandon the other survivors. Now empowered in the same way as Adams and Halpern, Johnson returns to DH-8, and using the submarine the trio escape before the explosives set by Halpern count down and destroy the spaceship, research habitat, and surrounding site.

On the surface, confined to a decompression chamber, the trio ponder on what version of their story to tell the Navy. Realizing they could not control the power granted them by the sphere, they decide its knowledge to be too dangerous to be communicated, and resolve to use its power to remove it from themselves and alter their memories, replacing the fantastical experiences with more mundane memories of a technical failure, though it is hinted that Halpern has kept her power.

== Main characters ==
- Norman Johnson—the protagonist and a psychologist who, years earlier, was responsible for defining the operational procedures should the US ever come into contact with alien life, although he admits that he treated the request to do so as a joke at the time. These procedures were outlined in a report entitled Recommendations for the Human Contact Team to Interact With Unknown Life Forms, often abbreviated ULF. Despite being the least physically fit team member in the context of an underwater habitat, he is arguably the most level-headed of the group. Nonetheless, Johnson takes time and trouble to convince the group to collaborate.
- Harold "Harry" Adams—a young, intelligent, African-American mathematician. While intellectually gifted and professionally secure, he is arrogant, unsympathetic, disdainful, and often uncooperative with the others, as a legacy of growing up as a mathematical prodigy who was often picked on as a child because of his lack of athletic talent.
- Elizabeth Halpern—a biochemist who is muscular, sometimes gentle and caring while simultaneously fierce, combative, and confrontational. She perceives herself as being dominated by the male scientists.
- Theodore Fielding—an astrophysicist and an enthusiastic opportunist, whose pretensions tend to cause conflict in his relationships with the others, despite his good intentions. It is later revealed his ambition is driven by anxiety and a conviction that he has to achieve fame and do so fast, as he believes that the time for him to do so is running out.
- Arthur Levine—a marine biologist and the sole member of the team not chosen by Norman. He is also the only team member who does not make the descent to the crash site.
- Harold C. Barnes—a retired Navy captain who has charge of the underwater scientific investigation. He is brusque, impatient, and distrustful, possibly as a result of his military background. This leads to conflicts with the other main characters. He withholds crucial information from the team and his crew, following his own agenda at the expense of the others with tragic consequences.
- Alice "Teeny" Fletcher—a Navy chief petty officer in charge of maintaining the habitat. She is friendly and competent, despite Norman's initial skepticism. It is not specifically explained how she dies, but the survivors find a trail of blood and one of her shoes after the second giant squid attack.
- Tina Chan—a Navy petty officer and electronics technician who is in charge of communications. She develops a friendship with Halpern, and is one of the longest surviving Navy personnel killed by the manifestations.
- Rose Levy—a Navy seaman who serves as the habitat's cook.
- Jane Edmunds—a Navy petty officer and data processing technician who serves as the operation's archivist. She is responsible for recording events and transferring the tapes to the submarine at DH-7, which is pre-programmed to return to the surface if not reset before a failsafe 12-hour countdown reaches 0, intended to ensure that at the very least a partial record will survive in case of catastrophe.

== Background ==
Crichton began writing the novel in 1967 as a companion piece to The Andromeda Strain. His initial storyline began with American scientists discovering a 300-year-old spaceship underwater with stenciled markings in English. However, Crichton later realized that he "didn't know where to go with it" and put off completing the book until a later date.

The idea of doing a story about contact with superior intelligence, a time-honored theme, is that it's very hard if you stop and think about it. Most writers evade the issue by making the aliens recognizably human. It's 9 feet tall with spiky teeth and it wants to eat you. Or its 3 feet tall and it wants to hug you. In either case its humanlike... What's more likely about first contact with an extraterrestrial is that the alien wouldn't look humanlike at all. You might not even be able to see it or detect it. And its behavior would be absolutely inexplicable. Trouble is, it gets hard to dream up a story where at the center there is something inexplicable.

== Adaptations ==
=== Film ===
The book was made into the film Sphere (1998), directed by Barry Levinson, with a cast including Dustin Hoffman (Norman Johnson, renamed Norman Goodman), Samuel L. Jackson (Harry Adams), Peter Coyote (Harold Barnes), Liev Schreiber (Ted Fielding), and Sharon Stone (Beth Halpern, renamed Beth Halperin).

The film largely follows the novel, although there are differences. The film received negative reviews from critics and has been described as having "bombed" at the box office. It was rated 12% by Rotten Tomatoes with the consensus opinion: "Sphere features an A-level cast working with B-grade material, with a story seen previously in superior science-fiction films". Film critic Roger Ebert described Sphere as "a watered-down take on the sci-fi classic Solaris by Stanislaw Lem, which was made into an immeasurably better film by Andrei Tarkovsky".

=== Planned television series ===
In August 2020, Entertainment Weekly reported that HBO would be developing a television series based on the novel.

== Reception ==
Reviews were mostly positive for the novel in contrast to its film adaptation. For example, The New York Times' Robin McKinley wrote, "Part of the fun of Sphere is that it keeps you going even when you're pretty sure of what will happen next."

== See also ==
- List of underwater science fiction works
- Forbidden Planet – 1956 science fiction film by Fred M. Wilcox
- "The Red One", a short story by Jack London
- Roadside Picnic – 1972 novel by Arkady and Boris Strugatsky
- Solaris – 1961 novel by Stanisław Lem
