= Sphere (1998 film) =

American science fiction film by Barry Levinson

- Theatrical release poster
- Directed by: Barry Levinson
- Screenplay by: Stephen Hauser; Paul Attanasio
- Adaptation by: Kurt Wimmer
- Based on: Sphere by Michael Crichton
- Produced by: Barry Levinson; Michael Crichton; Andrew Wald
- Starring: Dustin Hoffman; Sharon Stone; Samuel L. Jackson; Peter Coyote; Liev Schreiber
- Cinematography: Adam Greenberg
- Edited by: Stu Linder
- Music by: Elliot Goldenthal
- Production company: Baltimore Pictures
- Distributed by: Warner Bros.
- Release date: February 13, 1998
- Running time: 134 minutes
- Country: United States
- Language: English
- Budget: $73–80 million
- Box office: $73.4 million

Sphere is a 1998 American science fiction psychological thriller film directed and produced by Barry Levinson, adapted by Kurt Wimmer and starring Dustin Hoffman, Sharon Stone and Samuel L. Jackson. The film centers on a large mysterious underwater object discovered by Navy divers. It is based on Michael Crichton's novel of the same name.

The film was released by Warner Bros. in the United States on February 13, 1998, to negative reviews and was a box office failure, grossing $73.4 million against a $73–80 million budget.

== Plot ==
A spacecraft presumed to be of alien origin is discovered on the floor of the Pacific Ocean, estimated to have been there for nearly 300 years. A team of experts, including marine biologist Dr. Beth Halperin, mathematician Dr. Harry Adams, astrophysicist Dr. Ted Fielding, psychologist Dr. Norman Goodman and U.S. Navy Captain Harold Barnes, is assembled and taken to the Habitat, a state-of-the-art underwater living environment located near the spacecraft.

Examining the spacecraft, the team is perplexed to learn it is not alien at all but rather American in origin. However, its technology far surpasses any in the present day. The ship's computer logs cryptically suggest a mission that originated either in the distant past or future but the team deduces that the long-dead crew was tasked with collecting an item of scientific importance.

Norman and Beth discover the ship's logs, with the last entry noting an "unknown event". A holographic reenactment of the event reveals that hundreds of years in the future, the ship encountered a black hole, which apparently led to a crash landing in the ocean, back in the 1700s. Soon after, Norman and the others stumble on a large, yet perfect sphere hovering in the cargo bay. They cannot find any way to probe the inside of the sphere, as the fluid surface seems to be impenetrable. On observation, Norman ominously notes that the sphere reflects everything in the room, except them.

When they return to the Habitat, Harry hypothesizes that everyone on this team is fated to die. Harry notes that the black hole is referred to as an "unknown event" in the future logs. However, here in the present, they have knowledge of the historic event, yet it is unable to be explained later on. During the night, Harry returns to the spacecraft and is able to enter the sphere. Norman follows Harry, where he finds him unconscious next to the sphere, and returns him to the Habitat.

The next day, the crew discovers a series of numerically encoded messages appearing on the computer screens. The crew is able to decipher them, and comes to believe they are speaking to "Jerry", an alien intelligence from the sphere. They find that Jerry is able to see and hear everything that happens on the Habitat.

A powerful typhoon strikes the surface and the Habitat crew is forced to stay in the Habitat several more days. During that time, a series of tragedies strikes the crew, including attacks from aggressive jellyfish and a giant squid and equipment failures in the base that kill Ted, Barnes and the team's support staff. The survivors, Beth, Harry and Norman, believe Jerry is responsible. Norman discovers that they had misinterpreted the initial messages from Jerry, and that the entity speaking to them through the computers is actually Harry himself, transmitted from his mind while he is asleep. Norman and Beth eventually realize that when Harry entered the sphere, he gained the ability to make anything he imagines a reality, and they conclude that all the horrors that have befallen the Habitat were manifestations of Harry's fears.

Norman and Beth sedate Harry with enough sleeping drugs to put him into a dreamless sleep to prevent him from doing any further damage. However, when Norman is attacked by a snake, Beth realizes that Harry alone could not have been responsible for everything that had happened on the Habitat and she confronts Norman, accusing him of entering the sphere when he went to retrieve Harry. Beth's suspicions prove to be correct but after experiencing her own nightmarish vision, she confesses to Norman that she too entered the sphere.

When rejoined by Harry, the group realizes that the crew of the ship must have also entered the sphere and they ended up killing each other after being driven mad by their fears. Under the stress of the situation, Beth has suicidal thoughts, which causes the detonation mechanisms on a store of explosives to engage, threatening to destroy the base and the spacecraft. They race to the Habitat's mini-sub but their combined fears cause them to reappear back in the spacecraft. As a psychologist, Norman is able to see through the illusion. He triggers the mini-sub's undocking process and overrides the others' fears that they will not escape the destruction of the Habitat and spacecraft. The sphere is untouched by the explosions.

The mini-sub makes it to the surface as the surface ships return. As Beth, Harry and Norman begin safe decompression, they realize that they will be debriefed and their newfound powers discovered. Fearing humans are not ready for this ability they agree to erase their memories of the event using their powers, to ensure the "unknown event" paradox is resolved. The sphere then rises from the ocean and accelerates away into distant space.

== Cast ==
- Dustin Hoffman as Dr. Norman Goodman
- Sharon Stone as Dr. Elizabeth "Beth" Halperin
- Samuel L. Jackson as Dr. Harry Adams
- Liev Schreiber as Dr. Ted Fielding
- Peter Coyote as Capt. Harold C. Barnes
- Queen Latifah as Alice "Teeny" Fletcher
- Marga Gómez as Jane Edmunds
- Huey Lewis as Helicopter Pilot
- Bernard Hocke as Seaman
- James Pickens, Jr. as OSSA Instructor
- Michael Keys Hall as OSSA Official
- Ralph Tabakin as OSSA Official

== Production ==
Dustin Hoffman joined the cast because of Barry Levinson's involvement. Hoffman and Levinson had collaborated on several prior projects and Hoffman had faith that Levinson could raise the project beyond its script. Due to budgetary concerns, pre-production stopped in October 1996 and the script was revised. In the interim, Levinson directed Wag the Dog, which also starred Hoffman.

Shooting on Sphere began in March 1997 with a budget that Variety estimates was $80 million. Shooting took place at a naval base on Mare Island in Vallejo, California. Principal photography ended in July 1997 after 68 days.

== Release ==
Sphere initially had a Christmas 1997 release date but was moved forward to avoid competition. Warner Bros. Pictures released the film theatrically in the U.S. February 13, 1998, where it debuted in third place and grossed $37 million in total. Sphere performed on-par internationally, grossing $73.4 million worldwide. The film was a box office failure.

== Reception ==
Sphere received mostly negative reviews from critics. On Rotten Tomatoes, the film has an approval rating of 12%, based on 57 reviews. The site's critical consensus states: "Sphere features an A-level cast working with B-grade material, with a story seen previously in superior science-fiction films." On Metacritic, the film has a score of 35 out of 100, based on 21 critics, indicating "generally unfavorable reviews". Audiences surveyed by CinemaScore gave the film a "C−" on scale of A+ to F.

Todd McCarthy of Variety said that it was derivative of classic science fiction films and devoid of suspense. Janet Maslin of The New York Times wrote: "While this is no quick-witted treat on a par with Mr. Levinson's Wag the Dog, it's a solid thriller with showy scientific overtones." The Los Angeles Times characterized it as a flop. Kenneth Turan wrote: "The more the movie explains itself, the more ordinary it becomes." Roger Ebert of the Chicago Sun-Times gave the film one-and-a-half stars out of four, and stated: "Sphere feels rushed. The screenplay uses lots of talk to conceal the fact that the story has never been grappled with."

== Soundtrack ==
Sphere

Soundtrack album by Elliot Goldenthal
- Released: February 25, 1998
- Genres: Classical, avant-garde, modernist
- Length: 35:36
- Labels: Varèse Sarabande, Cat. VSD-5913
- Producer: Elliot Goldenthal

Elliot Goldenthal chronology
The Butcher Boy (1997)	Sphere (1998)	In Dreams (1998)

Soundtrack
Review scores
Source	Rating
Allmusic	link
Filmtracks	link

The score for Sphere was composed by Elliot Goldenthal.

Crew credits

- Music composed and produced by Elliot Goldenthal
- Orchestrated by Robert Elhai and Elliot Goldenthal
- Conducted by Stephen Mercurio and Jonathan Sheffer
- Recorded and mixed by Joel Iwataki
- Electronic music produced by Richard Martinez
- Film music editor: Curtis Roush
- Additional orchestrations by Deniz Hughes

== Legacy ==
Barry Levinson said he had been inspired to write the basic plot line for his subsequent film, Liberty Heights, based on a review of Sphere for Entertainment Weekly. Its critic, Lisa Schwarzbaum, specified that Hoffman played "the empathetic Jewish psychologist. Okay, so he's not officially Jewish; he's only Hoffman, who arrives at the floating habitat and immediately announces, noodgey and menschlike, 'I'd like to call my family.' You do the math." Levinson remarked:

If I do the math, I will discover what? That he is officially Jewish? What does that have to do with the movie? Do we need to know the math of Mel Gibson or Tom Cruise? Why would an actor in a sci-fi film be singled out as Jewish? For days it troubled me. Negative reviews are part of filmmaking, but what did this comment mean? Suddenly, I remembered my childhood impression that everyone in the world was Jewish, and the subsequent realization: Not only wasn't the world Jewish, but 99 percent of the world wasn't! And that led to memories of a time when Jews were denied access to a swim club, and not allowed to live in certain parts of Baltimore, just as blacks were excluded. School integration didn't happen until 1954. Finally, there was a reason to revisit Baltimore once again, not to indulge nostalgia, but to examine race, religion and class distinction. With the story of the friendship between a Jewish boy and a black girl who find themselves classmates in a newly integrated high school, I wanted to examine not the anger among Baltimore's different populations but the lack of understanding -- because with misunderstanding comes humor, humor from character.

== See also ==
- List of underwater science fiction works
