= Meg: Generations =

2018/2020 science fiction novel by Steve Alten

- First edition
- Author: Steve Alten
- Language: English
- Series: Meg
- Genre: Science fiction horror
- Publisher: Headline Publishing Group
- Publication date: January 30, 2018 (digital); July 21, 2020 (paper/hardback)
- Publication place: United States
- Media type: Print (paperback and hardback) and Audiobook
- Pages: 384 pp (paperback)
- ISBN: 978-1-5047-7124-5 (paperback)
- Preceded by: Meg: Nightstalkers
- Followed by: Meg: Purgatory

Meg: Generations (known digitally as Meg^{6}: Generations) is a 2018 science fiction horror novel by American author Steve Alten. It is the sequel to Meg: Nightstalkers and the sixth book in the MEG series. Continuing the adventures of Jonas Taylor and his family following the cliffhanger ending of the previous novel, as Jonas and his best friend Mac search the Panthalassa Sea for the cure for cancer, as megalodons (megs) also roam the Salish Sea, and a liopleurodon (lio) escapes into the coasts of the Middle East. The novel's audiobook was narrated by Keith Szarabajka, with Erik Hollander designing the cover. Digitally released in 2018, the novel saw physical release in 2020.

== Plot summary ==
Picking up immediately where Meg: Nightstalkers left off, the Liopleurodon offspring has been moved to a holding tank aboard the Dubai-Land transport ship Tonga for its journey to the Middle East. While the Crown Prince's investors gawk at the creature, below deck in the tanker's hold, another captured beast is awakened from its drug-induced state and goes on a rampage. The vessel sinks, the Lio escapes... and three distinct plots emerge:

- The hunt to recapture the Lio.
- The hunt to capture and pen any surviving Megalodon pups birthed by Lizzy and Bela in the Salish Sea.
- A Stage-IV death sentence of cancer that will force Jonas Taylor to return to the most frightening location on Earth – the Panthalassa Sea.

== Reception ==
Critical reception for Generations was mixed-to-positive, meeting with praise from most reviewers. Publishers Weekly complimented the "predictable" nature of the novel, stating that "Series fans who won't mind more of the same will be pleased.". CannonballRead complimented "the most memorable character in MEG: Generations [as] the meg Luna, the albino granddaughter of Angel, who has the bizarre habit of rising out of the water to stare at the full moon", stating that "If Alten pivoted and wrote a children's book about Luna and her adventures I would totally buy it because she is adorable and at this point the only character I don't want to see get eaten.", while otherwise criticising "spending about 200 pages wrapping up the previous [novel's] plot arc and introducing character after character after character who serves no purpose whatsoever other than to get eaten or supply exposition and contribute to the word count.".

The Book Shark praised the "back to basics" approach of the novel in "eliminating a lot of the craziest science fiction stuff [from previous novels] in favor of giant sea monster moments", ending up "an average entry in the series and not one of the standouts", with the "chief complaint with this book continu[ing] to be the over reliance of the Liopleurodon storyline which has never seemed as interesting to me as the megalodon stuff." Creature From the Black Lagoon meanwhile criticised the novel as "just a hot mess[...] a difficult, and not very enjoyable, book to read. Too much was going on, too much of it felt like either filler or shoe horned into the plot. The book started off solid but just rockets straight off the rails and never gets back on.".

== Sequel ==
A sequel, Meg: Purgatory, is available for pre-order from the author's website.

== See also ==
- Meg: A Novel of Deep Terror
- List of underwater science fiction works
