= Legend3D =

American stereoscopic animation studio and multimedia company

Legend 3D
- Type: Public
- Industry: Film, television
- Founded: August 2001; 25 years ago
- Defunct: December 2021; 4 years ago (bankruptcy)
- Fate: Defunct
- Headquarters: Los Angeles, California, United States
- Number of locations: 3
- Key people: Jeremy Novak, CEO; Shamitha Kattukandy, COO
- Products: stereoscopic conversion
- Website: legend3d.com

Legend 3D was an American stereoscopic conversion studio and multimedia company.

Founded in 2001, the company produced 3D conversion and visual effects work. In November 2016, Legend 3D moved into its facility on the Columbia Square campus in Hollywood, CA. In October 2017, the company announced it was expanding its presence with a new facility in Pune, India. In February 2018, Toronto Star reported that the Toronto division of Legend3D has downsized its work force to about 100 employees. The government had previously announced that it will allocate provincial government fund for $3.1 million to the L.A firm to create 271 new jobs while retaining 280 positions in its Toronto office. When the government announced the funds for Legend, the company also pledged to invest $27 million in the Toronto office. The Ontario government says its officials are now “working with Legend 3D to confirm that they are following the terms of our contract."

As of March 2019, The Toronto office has been silently shuttered and staff have been laid off after finding more cost effective labour in India. The executive team has also been replaced once again.

As of December 2021, Legend has filed for bankruptcy.

== Company history ==
Barry Sandrew, Ph.D., founded Legend Films in 2001, originally as a colorization studio, building on the patents from American Film Technologies where he served as CTO from 1986-1991. In 1985, Barry left his position as staff neuroscientist at Harvard and Mass General Hospital and pioneered the first all-digital technology and process for colorizing black and white films. The company produced colorized product for Fox Home Entertainment, Universal Pictures, Turner, Paramount, Sony, Japan's Tsuburaya, BBC and several other major global media and distribution companies. In 2010, following the release of Alice in Wonderland, he changed the name of Legend Films to Legend 3D, and colorization took on a low priority in order for the company to focus entirely on the stereoscopic conversion of feature films and commercials.

The stereoscopic conversion industry went through a Wild West of development with each of the 3 big conversion studios developing their own proprietary software to get through the incredible amount of content delivered in the peak of 3D. Legend was known for having incredibly high quality and low margins due to sales executives underbidding each other between the competing studios. Legend was known for doing a lot of work with Disney and Sony, while their main rival StereoD, was known for capturing all market around Universal, Legendary Pictures, Marvel, and ILM. In late 2014, the company expanded to create two additional lines of business: Legend VFX, providing visual effects, and Legend VR, offering pre- and post-production services for the creation of virtual reality experiences. Late 2014 is when a temporary studio was built up out of the Sheridan College's rentable conferences room ON, Canada. This led to the downsizing of the Carlsbad branch. This temporary location was strategically placed to recruit college students. This along with many other reasons caused key executives at the studio to depart the studio due to disagreements with investors over where the industry should go.

In September 2017, the company opened a facility in Pune, India. In December 2017, the company opened another facility in Luoyang, China, which hosts over 100 members.

In December 2021, Legend3D holdings has closed all locations and filled for bankruptcy.

== Visual Effects Services ==
Legend's teams in Asia Pacific allow for plate preparation & augmentation. The RPM department's work allows for streaming episodics and feature films.

== Downsizing and closing of Toronto Facility ==
In February 2018, Toronto Star reported that the Toronto division of Legend3D has downsized its work force to about 100 employees. The liberal government had previously announced that it will allocate provincial government fund for $3.1 million to the L.A firm to create 271 new jobs while retaining 280 positions in its Toronto office. When the government announced the funds for Legend, the company also pledged to invest $27 million in the Toronto office. The Ontario government says its officials are now “working with Legend 3D to confirm that they are following the terms of our contract."

The terms of the contract were never fulfilled and the office was closed March 2019.

== Notable releases ==
=== Films converted to 3D ===
- RRR (2022) - theatrical release
- Pushpa: The Rise (2021) - theatrical release
- Pelli SandaD (2021) - theatrical release
- Eternals (2021) - theatrical release
- Shang-Chi and the Legend of the Ten Rings (2021) - theatrical release
- Black Widow (2021) - theatrical release
- Vakeel Saab (2021) - theatrical release
- Gaddalakonda Ganesh (2019) - theatrical release
- Bigil (2019) - theatrical release
- Gemini Man (2019) - theatrical release
- Maharshi (2019) - theatrical release
- NTR: Kathanayakudu (2019) - theatrical release
- Spider-Man: Far From Home (2019) - theatrical release
- Detective Pikachu (2019) - theatrical release
- Avengers: Endgame (2019) - theatrical release
- Captain Marvel (2019) - theatrical release
- Zero (2018) - theatrical release
- Ant-Man and the Wasp (2018) - theatrical release
- The Meg (2018) - theatrical release
- Alpha (2018) - theatrical release
- A Wrinkle in Time (2018) - theatrical release
- Black Panther (2018) - theatrical release
- My Little Pony: The Movie (2017) - theatrical release
- Spider-Man: Homecoming (2017) - theatrical release
- Pirates of the Caribbean: Dead Men Tell No Tales (2017) - theatrical release
- King Arthur: Legend of the Sword (2017) - theatrical release
- Ghostbusters: Answer the Call (2016) - theatrical release
- Suicide Squad (2016) - theatrical release
- Pete's Dragon (2016) - theatrical release
- Passengers (2016) - theatrical release
- The Hunger Games: Mockingjay - Part 2 (2015) - theatrical release
- Goosebumps (2015) - theatrical release
- The Walk (2015) - theatrical release
- Enchanted Kingdom (2015) - theatrical release
- Ant-Man (2015) - theatrical release
- Poltergeist (2015) - theatrical release
- Insurgent (2015) - theatrical release
- Jupiter Ascending (2015) - theatrical release
- Maleficent (2014) - theatrical release
- Transformers: Age of Extinction (2014) - theatrical release
- The Amazing Spider-Man 2 (2014) - theatrical release
- The Lego Movie (2014) - theatrical release
- Metallica Through the Never (2013) - theatrical release
- Man of Steel (2013) - theatrical release
- The Smurfs 2 (2013) - theatrical release
- The Little Mermaid 3D (2013) - theatrical release
- Oz: The Great and Powerful (2013) - theatrical release
- Top Gun 3D (2013) - theatrical 3D re-release and Blu-ray 3D release
- 3D Classics: March of the Wooden Soldiers in 3D (2012) - Blu-ray 3D release
- 3D Classics: The Little Rascals in 3D (2012) - Blu-ray 3D release
- 3D Classics: The Three Stooges in 3D (2012) - Blu-ray 3D release
- Life of Pi (2012) - theatrical release
- The Amazing Spider-Man (2012) - theatrical release
- Ghost Rider: Spirit of Vengeance (2012) - theatrical release
- Hugo (2011) - theatrical release
- The Smurfs (2011) - theatrical release
- Transformers: Dark of the Moon (2011) - theatrical release
- Green Lantern (2011) - theatrical release
- Pirates of the Caribbean: On Stranger Tides (2011) - theatrical release
- Priest (2011) - theatrical release
- The Green Hornet (2011) - theatrical release
- Shrek, Shrek 2 and Shrek the Third (2010) - Blu-ray 3D release
- Alice in Wonderland (2010) - theatrical release

=== Commercials ===
In 2008, Legend converted a commercial for Skittles candy for the M&M/Mars Company

=== Special events ===
Legend performed 3D conversion of large-screen video material for the This Is It concerts.
