= The Trench (novel) =

1999 science fiction novel by Steve Alten

- First edition
- Author: Steve Alten
- Language: English
- Series: Meg
- Genre: Science fiction horror
- Publisher: Headline Publishing Group
- Publication date: May 1999
- Publication place: United States
- Media type: Print (paperback and hardback) and Audiobook
- Pages: 432 pp (paperback)
- ISBN: 0-7860-1114-9 (paperback)
- OCLC: 44529502
- Preceded by: Meg: A Novel of Deep Terror
- Followed by: Meg: Primal Waters

The Trench (known digitally as The Trench: Meg 2) is a 1999 science fiction horror novel by American author Steve Alten. It is the sequel to Meg: A Novel of Deep Terror and the second book in the MEG series. The book continues the adventure of Jonas Taylor, a paleobiologist studying the megalodon, who now discovers another prehistoric monster, Kronosaurus, also thought to have been extinct. A sequel titled Meg: Primal Waters was released in 2004.

== Plot summary ==
4 years after the events of the previous novel, a deep sea submersible, Proteus, is attacked by unknown creatures and destroyed while on a geological survey of the Mariana Trench's sea floor.

In Monterey, California, paleobiologist and former deep sea pilot Jonas Taylor is now working for his father-in-law Masao Tanaka at the Tanaka Oceanographic Institute studying the lone surviving Megalodon offspring alongside his friend Mac. The shark, named Angel, has grown into a 72 ft (22 m), 31 t (68,000 lb) monster who draws crowds from all over the world to get a glimpse of its incredible size. In the 4 years since the opening of the institute, lawsuits filed by the survivors of the people Angel's mother killed has crippled the institute financially, forcing Masao to sell controlling interest to energy mogul Benedict Singer. Jonas and his wife, Terry Tanaka, are struggling with their marriage as Jonas is obsessed with trying to make sure Angel doesn't escape her tank as well as the strain of their first child being stillborn.

After the Proteus implodes in the trench, Singer insists on Jonas joining him aboard the Goliath, Singer's research ship, and help with the investigation of the accident. Jonas, plagued by nightmares where he and Terry die in the Trench, refuses the request, insisting that he remain at the institute to determine what damage Angel is doing to the steel doors keeping her in the lagoon. Masao is forced to go in Jonas' place and Terry joins him, finally confronting Jonas about her unhappiness with their marriage. Aboard the Goliath, Masao and Terry meet Singer and his protege Celeste, agreeing to stay until Singer's deep water laboratory, The Benthos, is able to send the sonar records of the accident. Back at the institute, 3 teen boys break into the underwater viewing gallery and pound on the glass, enraging Angel and causing her to ram the glass, flooding the gallery and devouring the boys.

After receiving news of the attack, Masao and Celeste return to Monterey to handle the fallout while Terry remains aboard the Goliath to finish the accident report. Unable to sleep one night, Terry goes for a walk and discovers a research lab hidden within the ship. She sneaks inside to explore it discovering an experimental fusion reactor. Terry is nearly caught, but manages to escape detection, wondering what Singer's true intentions in the Trench really are.

Back in Monterey, Jonas and Mac finally examine the gates and realize that Angel's head on collisions have nearly destroyed the hinges. While Jonas dives in the canal, he is attacked by several great white sharks. Angel rams the gate again, this time escaping into open ocean, but not before Mac is able to tag her with a homing device. While recuperating at the hospital, Jonas realizes that Angel is ovulating, explaining her more aggressive nature and the male great whites swimming outside the lagoon doors. Celeste asks Jonas to join her in following Angel and help recapture her. Jonas agrees and works out a deal for him and Mac, but Jonas really wants to get close to Angel so he can kill her with a grenade rifle. Jonas and Mac join Celeste aboard the William Beebe where they are accompanied by first mate, Harry Moon, submersible pilot Richard Diefendorf, and Michael Maren, a marine biologist who constantly antagonizes Jonas. The team follows Angel as she heads north along the Pacific coast following whales on their summer migration to the Bering Sea.

Aboard the Goliath, Benedict Singer, knowing Terry discovered his lab, manipulates her into joining him aboard the Benthos so she can analyze the records of the Proteus accident. While in the underwater lab, Singer allows his megalomania to take hold and he begins tormenting Terry, allowing his henchman, Sergei, to attempt to rape her, though Terry is able to fight him off. She finds an ally in paleobiologist Heath Williams, who promises to do his best to protect her from Sergei. While analyzing the sonar records, Terry realizes that the tapes have been edited, but submits a report saying the sub went down due to pilot error, knowing it's her only hope of Singer letting her off the Benthos. Terry accepts Singer's invitation to join the research sub Prometheus, but the sub is attacked by the same creatures that destroyed the Proteus, narrowly escaping when the Benthos arrives, the creatures being fearful of the size of the research lab.

Masao, having found out that Terry has entered the Trench against his and Jonas' wishes, suffers a heart attack.

While tracking Angel, Jonas and his team see an opportunity to trap the meg in Grays Harbor knowing she would go after a gray whale calf named Tootie, a whale that Sea World saved and released before Angel escaped. Sea World helps trying to coordinate Tootie's rescue with Angel's recapture. However, after netting Tootie, Angel closes in and eats her, disabling the trawler's winch, which also causes the helicopter Mac and Jonas are in to crash. Angel attempts to escape the bay, but the gill nets put in place across the inlet have her trapped. Enraged by this, Angel attacks the Lady Washington, a replica 18th century tall ship and terrorizing the wedding party using the ship. Jonas, realizing that Angel is angry she's confined again, urges Celeste to retract the nets. Diefendorf enters the Abyss Glider to try and lure Angel away from the tall ship and back to the William Beebe to be harpooned, but Angel kills him and escapes back into the ocean. Following this, Celeste begins to attempt to seduce Jonas and tries to get him to disclose the top secret location, Devil's Purgatory, where he first encountered the Megalodon 11 years previously, but Jonas refuses to give the location.

Back on board the Benthos, the mysterious creatures grow more bold in their attacks, disabling the Prometheus' engines after the sub unearths an immense fossil from the ocean floor. Heath inspects the fossil and discovers it is a subspecies of Kronosaurus, a marine reptile that has escaped extinction and the same creatures that are attacking the Prometheus and destroyed the Proteus. The Prometheus is ordered to the surface to be repaired and have bright underwater lights attached to the hull to repel the Kronosaurs. Its sister ship, the Epimetheus taking its place in the Trench. Terry tries to escape via the Prometheus, but is prevented by Sergei. Terry senses a possible ally in the Benthos' captain and pleads with him to help save her life. He agrees and promises to meet her later that night. When Terry goes to meet him at the hangar, she discovers his throat has been cut by Sergei, who ambushes her. As he attempts to rape her, she fights back and knocks him out with a metal pipe. Securing the doors, Terry enters the hangar control room and starts flooding the chamber killing Sergei. Unfortunately, this results in a Kronosaurus swimming into the hangar to feed on Sergei's corpse and erasing any hopes of Terry's to steal the Epimetheus and escape.

In the Gulf of Alaska, the William Beebe uses sea lions baited with drugs to try and lure Angel. Jonas and Mac are on watch at night when they decide to enact their plan to kill Angel. Mac takes to the air in his helicopter while Jonas is towed in a life raft ahead of the bait and uses underwater speakers to ensure Angel appears. When she finally does, Jonas takes his shot, but his rifle won't fire. Suddenly his raft stops in the water, the line having been cut by someone Mac sees rushing back inside the ship. With the bait now on a collision course with him, Jonas jumps onto the bait and tries to maneuver it away from Angel. Mac lands back on the ship and reels in the bait, saving Jonas, but Angel attacks the ships winch and disables it before disappearing. Jonas goes into shock from hypothermia and awakens in a hospital. Jonas finds out he momentarily died on the operating table and decides he is done with megalodons, refusing Celeste's pleas to rejoin the hunt saying Angel is too big to recapture and wanting to start life anew with Terry. Celeste again tries to coax the location of Devil's Purgatory from him, but Jonas, remembering Mac's words of warning against trusting Celeste, again refuses.

Aboard the William Beebe, Mac kidnaps Dr. Maren believing he is responsible for Jonas' accident. Mac takes Maren in his helicopter and drops Maren off in the Alaskan wilderness, intending to leave him there. Maren pleads his case, admitting to removing the firing pin from the rifle, but insists he didn't cut the rope, revealing he was sleeping with Celeste at the time. Mac believes his story, but still leaves him in the wilderness miles from civilization. Back at the hospital, Celeste drugs Jonas and manipulates him into revealing the location of Devil's Purgatory. When Mac picks up Jonas, he tells Jonas about Maren's story and that there is still someone onboard who has it out for Jonas. He also reveals that Celeste left the ship after she returned from the hospital. When they are back on the ship, Jonas pleads with the captain and Harry Moon to take him to the Mariana Trench. An earthquake has made Jonas realize that Angel hasn't been following the whales, she's been using the Pacific Rim to navigate her way back to the Mariana Trench in order to breed. Later, Jonas and Mac confront Harry, deducing that he was responsible for cutting the line to his raft. Harry reveals that he is with the CIA and was assigned to make sure Jonas didn't reveal the location of Devil's Purgatory.

Finally determined to figure out what exactly Singer is up to, Terry uses Sergei's keycard to access the high security laboratory aboard the Benthos. She is quickly caught by Singer and he reveals that he's really after helium-3, a rare isotope he hopes to use to create the world's first fusion reactor. Terry deduces that because of the unique economic zoning the Mariana Trench falls into, Singer couldn't legally mine the gas, so he used the Tanaka Institute and built his fleet of submersibles to legally enter the trench under the guise of establishing unmanned drones to use as an earthquake detection system. However the problem Singer had been facing was he didn't know where to look for the manganese nodules that contained the isotope. He reveals that the true purpose of the Navy dives that Jonas was part of was to find the isotope. Now, with Celeste having gotten the location from him, the Benthos is finally on its way to the Devil's Purgatory.

Masao, having checked himself out of the hospital, flies to Naval Base Guam and finds out that the U.S. government helped ensure the lawsuits against the Tanaka Institute went through and made sure they went bankrupt and were desperate enough to go to Benedict Singer for help. The CIA knew what Singer was up to and worked to plant agents within Singer's operation. One was killed aboard the Proteus as well as Heath Williams aboard the Benthos. They ask Masao to step in to get Terry back as well as their agent. Meanwhile, Angel arrives at the Mariana Trench and mates with a male.

Having arrived in the Devil's Purgatory, Singer sends the Epimetheus into the Trench to dig for the nodules, Terry joining the trek. Once again the ship is attacked by Kronosaurs, continuing to attack even when the ship is docked. Terry manages to escape the sub, but Singer orders the nodules brought on board. The Kronosaurs continue attacking, denting the hull of the Epimetheus enough to cause it to implode and the docking station to lose pressure, killing several of the crew. Singer orders the Benthos to ascend into the cold waters above, out of reach of the Kronosaurs, but the creatures attack the habitat's ballast tanks stranding it on the sea floor.

Jonas and Mac arrive on the Goliath, greeted by Masao and Celeste who reveal that Terry was killed during the destruction of the Epimetheus. Jonas is shown security footage of the accident, but refuses to believe that Terry was killed. Celeste reveals their plan to use the Prometheus to rescue Benedict and the remaining crew. Jonas leaves with Mac and Masao, taking the video to the William Beebe. Back aboard the ship, Jonas watches the video over and over and he and Mac see where the footage had been edited. Jonas concludes that Terry is alive and that he has to rescue her, using the deep water Abyss Glider.

On the Benthos, Terry, now locked in her room, desperately tries to figure out a way to escape the ship. Using an air duct, she sneaks into the adjoining room and dresses into a man's shirt, pants, and lab coat. Using locks of her hair, she fashions a disguise of sideburns and a mustache and makes her way to the docking station planning to hide in the bathroom utility closet. Her plan is thwarted by Celeste who catches her and has Terry sent to the hangar. Celeste joins Benedict on the observation deck where she drugs him and ties him to a chair. Celeste reveals that she knows Benedict murdered her mother when she was a child and bided her time, learning everything she could from Benedict. She leaves him tied to the chair in front of the window baiting in one of the Kronosaurs who attacks and destroys the glass killing itself and Benedict in the process. Knowing the Benthos doesn't have much longer, Celeste goes to the hangar and radios Jonas in his Abyss Glider that she is setting the hangar doors on automatic so they will open when he arrives. She also finds out that Angel is closing in.

Jonas enters the Trench in his Abyss Glider and is quickly attacked by the pack of Kronosaurs. The Prometheus makes a slow getaway, overloaded with crew and the nodules. Angel arrives and goes after the sub. Celeste radios Jonas and begs him to lure Angel away long enough for them to escape. Terry, knowing she's only minutes from death, undoes her bonds, but is unable to get back into the Benthos or into the control room. She attempts to climb into one of the sensor drones, but discovers the mutilated corpse of Heath. Jonas passes by the hangar sensors and the room begins filling with water. Terry manages to get inside the robot and seal the lid. Jonas leads Angel on a chase, but when Celeste mockingly tells him that Terry is still alive, he takes revenge by leading Angel right back to the sub. She attacks and rips off the observation pod causing the sub to implode.

Jonas makes it into the hangar. After it drains, he looks for Terry and realizes Celeste's plan. He finds the circuits that Terry ripped out of the robot to fit inside and discovers her still alive. Jonas and Terry are able to pry open the control room doors enough for her to slip inside and start the flooding process again. They get inside the Abyss Glider and escape just as the Benthos is destroyed. As they rise slowly in the escape pod, Jonas is faced again with his nightmare. As Angel rises to engulf the pod, a Kronosaur suddenly snatches the pod. Before it can escape, Angel attacks the marine reptile allowing Jonas and Terry to escape.

Months later, Angel gives birth to 2 male offspring.

== Sequel ==
A sequel titled Meg: Primal Waters was released in 2004.

== Adaptation ==
A film adaptation titled Meg 2: The Trench began filming at Warner Bros. Studios, Leavesden in February 2022. The film is a sequel to the 2018 film, The Meg. British director Ben Wheatley was announced to direct in October 2020, with Statham stating in April 2021 that filming would begin in 2022. The film released on August 4, 2023.

== See also ==
- Meg: A Novel of Deep Terror
- List of underwater science fiction works
