= Page Kennedy =

American actor

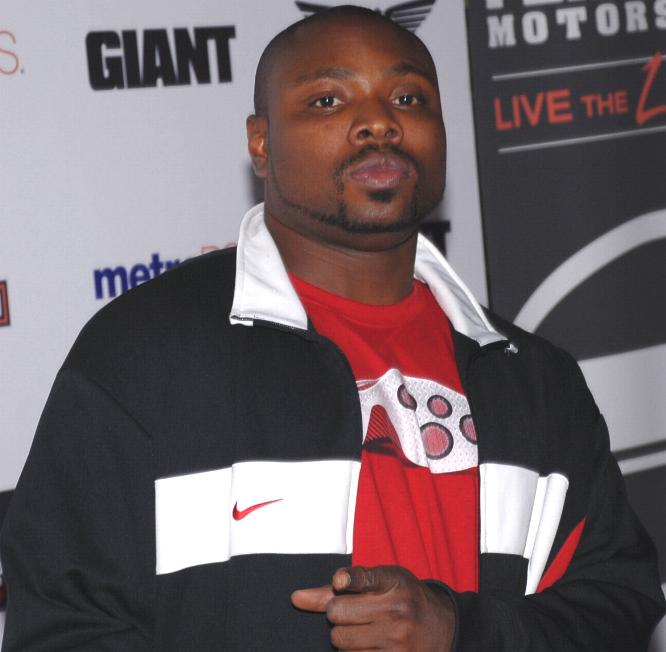
- Kennedy at the 2007 American Music Awards
- Born: Felton Eugene Kennedy II; November 23, 1976 (age 49); Detroit, Michigan, U.S.
- Occupations: Actor; rapper
- Children: 4

Page Kennedy (born Felton Eugene Kennedy II; November 23, 1976) is an American actor and rapper. In television, he is known for portraying Radon Randell in the Spike sports comedy series Blue Mountain State and "U-Turn" in the Showtime series Weeds. He has also appeared in film, with roles in S.W.A.T. and The Meg. Outside of acting, Kennedy is active on social media, best known for being a popular Viner. On March 10, 2017, he released his first full-length rap album titled Torn Pages featuring Royce da 5'9", Crooked I, Trick Trick and more.

== Early life and education ==
Felton Eugene Kennedy II was born in Detroit, but grew up in Los Angeles with his mother until he was six years of age. He then moved back to Detroit to reunite with his father, who died after ten years.

Kennedy attended Western Michigan University (WMU), before transferring to the University of Delaware (UD), and majored in theatre and acting. Kennedy's father was a doctor and encouraged his son to study medicine, but Kennedy gained a passion for acting after being introduced to the works of William Shakespeare at WMU. Kennedy subsequently chose to attend UD after performing with high distinction at Western Michigan.

== Career ==
Kennedy soon moved to Los Angeles and began to guest star on several shows including Six Feet Under, Blind Justice, Barbershop, Love, Inc., NYPD Blue, The Shield, Weeds and CSI: Crime Scene Investigation.

In 2005, Kennedy won a recurring role on the popular ABC primetime soap opera, Desperate Housewives where he played Caleb Applewhite, a fugitive who was being held captive in his mother Betty's (Alfre Woodard) basement. However shortly after in November 2005, Kennedy was fired from Desperate Housewives as the result of an internal investigation by the studio into an allegation of misconduct; Kennedy himself claimed that Touchstone Television, the producers of the show, wanted to take a new direction with the character and bought out his contract. He was replaced by NaShawn Kearse.

Kennedy joined the cast of Showtime's hit series Weeds during its second and third season. He played "U-Turn", a drug-dealer and self-described "thug".

Kennedy played Radon Randell, a quarterback starting over the main character, Alex Moran, in the Spike television series Blue Mountain State. Because Alex Moran does not want to start, he must keep Radon happy during the whole second season (the only season Radon was in). Radon's season ends in the championship game of his lone season when he aggravates a previous shoulder injury. Kennedy reprised his role in the 2016 feature-length film follow-up to the series.

Kennedy had a guest appearance whereas he played a burglar in the new 2013 TV series Legit. He also made an appearance in an episode of Robot Chicken as Kirby and Cal Zapata. Kennedy played a gay inmate and gang leader in My Name Is Earl and a married inmate and ex-con in Raising the Bar. In 2016, he starred in the YouTube Red original show Rhett & Link's Buddy System.

Kennedy played Gerald, the cousin of main character James Carter, on the CBS show Rush Hour. He appeared in all episodes of the show before its cancellation in 2016. In 2018, he had a prominent role in the blockbuster film The Meg, alongside Jason Statham, Ruby Rose, and Rainn Wilson.

== Filmography ==
=== Film ===
| Year | Title | Role | Notes |
|---|---|---|---|
| 2003 | S.W.A.T. | Travis | |
| 2003 | Leprechaun: Back 2 tha Hood | Jamie Davis | Video |
| 2005 | Shackles | Page | Video |
| 2005 | In the Mix | Twizzie | |
| 2007 | 4 Life | Sam | Video |
| 2009 | Dough Boys | Aub | |
| 2009 | Dance Flick | Security Guard | |
| 2009 | A Day in the Life | Ali | |
| 2009 | Janky Promoters | House DJ | |
| 2009 | See Dick Run | Craig | |
| 2012 | Freaky Deaky | Booker | |
| 2013 | Movie Date | Jealous Boyfriend | Short |
| 2014 | The Divorce Party | Landlord | |
| 2015 | Bad Roomies | Bud | |
| 2016 | Blue Mountain State: The Rise of Thadland | Radon Randell | |
| 2016 | FML | Lou | |
| 2018 | The Meg | DJ | |
| 2019 | Same Difference | Steve | |
| 2020 | Enjoy the Disco | Dancer | Short |
| 2022 | Hip Hop Family Christmas Wedding | Himself | TV movie |
| 2023 | Meg 2: The Trench | DJ | |
| 2024 | Roberta's Rules | Casey Washington | Short |
| 2024 | A Hip Hop Story | Pastor Simons | |
| 2025 | New Jack Fury | Silkwaan Styles | |
| 2025 | Code 3 | Officer Taggert | |
| 2025 | A Breed Apart | Big Farmer Jay | |

=== Television ===
| Year | Title | Role | Notes |
|---|---|---|---|
| 2002 | Six Feet Under | Josh Langmead | Episode: "Out, Out, Brief Candle" |
| 2002 | Philly | Davey Mink | Episode: "San Diego Padre" |
| 2002 | The Shield | Lamar Tilton | Episode: "Pilot" & "Cupid & Psycho" |
| 2003 | NYPD Blue | Corey Mack | Episode: "Shear Stupidity" |
| 2004 | 10-8: Officers on Duty | Trent Osbourne | Episode: "Love Don't Love Nobody" |
| 2004 | Medical Investigation | Gordon Kraft | Episode: "Team" |
| 2005 | Blind Justice | Mike Dawson | Episode: "Under the Gun" |
| 2005 | Love, Inc. | Jeff | Episode: "Pilot" |
| 2005 | Desperate Housewives | Caleb Applewhite | Recurring Cast: Season 2 |
| 2005–06 | Barbershop | Big Trickey | Recurring Cast |
| 2006 | Pepper Dennis | Ron Ashmore | Episode: "Pilot" |
| 2006 | CSI: Crime Scene Investigation | Jessie "Dollar" Cleveland | Episode: "Poppin' Tags" |
| 2006 | Boston Legal | Dennis Pryor | Episode: "Race Ipsa" |
| 2006–07 | Weeds | Louis "U-Turn" Wardell | Guest: Season 2, Main Cast: Season 3 |
| 2007 | CSI: Miami | Ron Cramer | Episode: "Burned" |
| 2007 | My Name Is Earl | Jamal | Episode: "The Gangs of Camden County" |
| 2008 | Raising the Bar | Sherron Nettles | Episode: "Hang Time" |
| 2008 | Cold Case | Michael 'Beamer' Hyacinth '08 | Episode: "Triple Threat" |
| 2010 | Justified | Curtis Mims | Episode: "Fixer" |
| 2010 | Bones | Stewart Bonder | Episode: "The Bones on the Blue Line" |
| 2010–11 | Blue Mountain State | Radon Randell | Main Cast: Season 2 |
| 2011 | The Closer | DeAndre Harmon | Episode: "Unknown Trouble" |
| 2012 | The Game | Jamel | Episode: "There's No Place Like Home" |
| 2012 | Puppet Cop | Police Academy Teacher | Episode: "Episode #1.3" |
| 2013 | Robot Chicken | Kirby/Cal Zapata (voice) | Episode: "Choked on a Bottle Cap" |
| 2013 | Legit | Machete | Episode: "Justice" |
| 2013 | Second Generation Wayans | William Stokes | Episode: "Independence Day" |
| 2013 | Southland | Katrell | Episode: "Babel" |
| 2014 | Chosen | Andre | Episode: "Downward Spiral" |
| 2014 | Bad Teacher | Coach Ed | Episode: "Found Money" |
| 2015 | The Soul Man | Jameel | Episode: "Oh Snow You Didn't" |
| 2015 | Backstrom | Officer Frank Moto | Main Cast |
| 2015 | Booze Lightyear | Guest Star | Episode: "The News on Drugs" |
| 2016 | Rush Hour | Gerald Page | Main Cast |
| 2018 | Unsolved | Corey Edwards | Recurring Cast |
| 2019 | Angel City Heroes | Gerald | Episode: "Down but not out" |
| 2021–23 | The Upshaws | Duck | Recurring Cast: Season 1–3, Guest: Season 4 |
| 2023 | Snowfall | Percy | Episode: "Concrete Jungle" |

=== Video games ===
| Year | Title | Role |
|---|---|---|
| 2006 | 24: The Game | Additional USA VO (voice) |
| 2006 | Marc Ecko's Getting Up: Contents Under Pressure | Cuda the Ferocious (voice) |
| 2023 | Starfield | Chanda Banda (voice) |

=== Web series ===
| Year | Title | Role | Notes |
|---|---|---|---|
| 2013 | "Thrift Shop" PARODY | Wanz | Body actor |
| 2013 | "Blurred Lines" PARODY | T.I. | Voice |
| 2016–17 | Rhett & Link's Buddy System | Maxwell | Main Cast |

== Discography ==
=== Studio albums ===
- Torn Pages (2017)
- Same Page, Different Story (2018)
- Page (2021)
- " Front Page" (2022)
- "Page Kennedy" (2025)

=== Collaborative albums ===
- N-Idea (with Timothy Kennedy) (2017)

=== Mixtapes ===
- Straight Bars (2017)
- Straight Bars 2 (2018)
- Straight Bars III (2019)
- Straight Bars 4 (2022)
- Straight Bars V (2024)
