= Flagship Entertainment Group =

Film production company based in Hong Kong

- Type: Joint venture
- Industry: Film
- Predecessor: Warner China Films HG
- Headquarters: Hong Kong
- Number of locations: 3
- Area served: Worldwide
- Key people: Richard Fox; Elaine Feng (president)
- Owners: Skydance Corporation (49%); China Media Capital (41%); TVB (10%)

Flagship Entertainment Group is a film production company based in Hong Kong and a joint venture between Skydance Corporation and a China Media Capital–led consortium established in 2015 that includes TVB.

Previously, Warner Bros. Entertainment was in a joint venture, the production and distribution company Warner China Film HG, with state-owned China Film Group and Hengdian Group, owner of Hengdian World Studios from 2006 to 2009.

== History ==
Flagship Entertainment Group's establishment was announced in September 2015. Talks to form the joint venture were confirmed to be under way in August 2015. The company announced its first slate of 12 films in March 2016, with the first film scheduled for release in 2016.

== Filmography ==
- When Larry Met Mary (Wen Zhang, 2016)
- Mission Milano (Wong Jing, 2016)
- The Adventurers (Stephen Fung, 2017)
- Paradox (Wilson Yip, 2017)
- The Meg (Jon Turteltaub, 2018)
- Wish Dragon (Chris Appelhans, 2021)
- Meg 2: The Trench (Ben Wheatley, 2023)
