= SeaQuest DSV (video game) =

1994 video game

seaQuest DSV
- Developer: Sculptured Software
- Publishers: Super NES: Malibu Games; Sega Genesis: NA: Black Pearl Software; EU: THQ
- Platforms: Super NES, Sega Genesis, Game Boy
- Release: Super NES: NA/EU: 1994; Sega Genesis: NA: February 1995; EU: June 30, 1995
- Genres: Action, strategy

seaQuest DSV is an action/strategy video game depiction of the seaQuest DSV television series for developed by Sculptured Software. A Super Nintendo Entertainment System version was published in 1994 and a Sega Genesis port in 1995. The player captains the submarine seaQuest DSV 4600 to carry out a series of missions in a scrolling, underwater environment.

The seaQuest DSV game for the Game Boy is completely different from the console versions.

== Gameplay ==
The game is divided into two parts; one in which the player controls the seaQuest in an isometric perspective overworld and is able to buy equipment and weapons and travel the ocean quadrant, and scrolling shooter style missions in which the player must achieve various objectives using a complement of mini-subs, robots, and a trained dolphin wearing an aqua-lung. Some of the missions are simplistic and require the player to make use of only one of the seaQuest's vessels; others have the player make use of several of them in succession. For example, there is a mission in the first ocean quadrants where the player must rescue the crew of an exploration vessel trapped in a caved-in underwater cave, and has to use armed subs to clear several cave-ins before they can bring in the only mini-sub that is equipped to rescue personnel from other subs. The missions also typically involve combat between the player's mini-subs and the units of pirates, eco-terrorists, and other foes, but also more often than not require the player to perform some sort of non-combat task such as the aforementioned rescue operation.

The other part of the game is the overworld where the player controls the seaQuest herself. These areas give the player access to several menus in which they can replace lost equipment, buy new weapons for the seaQuest, and read up on the various missions received while in that quadrant. While traveling a quadrant, the player comes across minefields, automated torpedo launchers and hostile submarines, many of which the player needs to destroy in order to achieve missions. For example, there is a mission in which the player is to seal the leaks in an oil tanker sunk by ecological terrorists. In addition to accomplish this objective with the mini-subs, the player needs to not only complete the mission itself, but also to use the seaQuest herself to sink every terrorist submarine near the oil tanker wreck.

The player receives money for destroying enemy targets and completing objectives. The player can lose money for destroying underwater settlements and killing animals present in some missions. Money is spent on weapons, countermeasures and mines for the player's seaQuest submarine, as well as replacements for lost vessels in missions. The player has no need to spend money on repairs, though, as the seaQuest and her complement subs repair themselves over time.

== Development ==
The various designs from oldest (left) to newest (right) as used in the game

THQ worked with the computer graphics team at Amblin Entertainment to make the seaQuest DSV game accurate and realistic to the designs seen in the series. Several of the original unused concept designs for the seaQuest (seen right), as well as concepts for the renegade pirate Delta IV submarine that was featured in the series pilot movie, were used in the game as enemy capital ships.

== Reception ==
Reception

Review scores
Publication	Score		
Publication	Game Boy	Sega Genesis	SNES
AllGame	N/A	N/A	4/5
Computer and Video Games	N/A	N/A	77/100
Game Players	N/A	82%	88/100
GamePro	15/20	N/A	16/20
Hyper	N/A	N/A	84%
Mean Machines Sega	N/A	77/100	N/A
Mega Fun	N/A	N/A	72%
Next Generation	N/A	4/5	N/A
Nintendo Power	11/20	N/A	12.7/20
Official Nintendo Magazine	N/A	N/A	83/100
Total!	N/A	N/A	83/100
Video Games (DE)	37%	69%	78%
VideoGames & Computer Entertainment	6/10	N/A	6/10
Entertainment Weekly	N/A	N/A	C+

Nintendo Power featured the SNES version in the "Classified Information" section of issue 75 and 82 of Nintendo Power. GamePro gave the SNES version a positive review, praising the intellectual challenge, the variety in how each of the five vehicles has different controls and purposes, and the 3D graphics effects on the ships.

Next Generation reviewed the Genesis version of the game, rating it four stars out of five, and stated that "If you have both systems, the SNES version is far superior. But Genesis owners won't be disappointed (unless they play the SNES first like we did)."

== See also ==
- List of underwater science fiction works
