= Lego Atlantis =

Lego theme

- Subject: Underwater exploration
- Availability: 2010–2011
- Total sets: 24
- Characters: Captain Ace Speedman; Dr. Jeff Fisher; Professor Sam Rhodes; Lance Spears; Axel Storm; Bobby Buoy; Shark Warrior; Manta Warrior; Squid Warrior; Portal Emperor

Lego Atlantis is a discontinued product range of the construction toy Lego, themed around the underwater world of Atlantis. The range was launched in early 2010 and discontinued by the end of 2011. The toy sets included models of buildable underwater vehicles, as well as "heroic diver" and "shark warrior" minifigures. A ride based on the range was operated at Legoland Windsor Resort.

== Development and launch ==
Designer William Thorogood commented that from design focus groups, "it emerged that there were certain key icons the product simply had to include: propellers, dome cockpits, big lights, helmets, harpoons, torpedo-like weapons, tridents, giant squid, and evil sharks."

The theme was revealed in the Lego Club Magazine in September 2009. The associated toy sets were released from December 2009.

== Story and characters ==
The Lego Atlantis theme backstory was described on the Lego website and in the Lego catalogue. The Atlantis Crew were described as a deep sea salvage crew who searched the ocean for shipwrecks and treasure. The crew finds a clue to the location of the long lost Atlantis city, and then makes it their mission to search it out and uncover its mysteries.

The sets introduced two groups of good and evil characters. The first was the Atlantis salvage crew of "heroic divers", led by Captain Ace Speedman. Also in the crew was marine biologist Dr. Jeff Fisher, First Mate Lance Spears, "Tech Expert" Axel Storm, and apprentice Bobby Buoy. Professor Samantha Artesia Rhodes was also part of the team, but was described as having "not initially been part of the crew, so she tricks them into helping look for Atlantis". She is the protagonist of the Atlantis Movie.

The evil characters were described as "Atlantis Warriors", and had human-like bodies with the heads of a sea creature. The three warriors were the "Squid Warrior" (with tentacles as well as a squid-like head), "Manta Warrior" (with the head of a manta ray), and "Shark Warrior'" who performed a shark attack. Finally, there was the "Portal Emperor", who resided over the portal to Atlantis.

== Sets and products ==
According to BrickLink, The Lego Group released a total of 24 Lego sets and promotional polybags as part of the Lego Atlantis theme. It was discontinued by the end of 2011. The largest, Portal of Atlantis (set number: 8078) contained 1007 pieces, and instructions to build a portal to Atlantis, as well as six minifigures: three divers, a shark warrior, a squid warrior, and the portal emperor. Others included Seabed Scavenger (set number: 8059), Typhoon Turbo Sub (set number: 8060), Gateway of the Squid (set number: 8061), Atlantis Exploration HQ (set number: 8077), Shadow Snapper (set number: 8079) and Temple of Atlantis (set number: 7985).

As well as the Lego models, a number of other products were created to tie-in with the theme. These included wearable items such as a water gun, a "harpoon blaster", a trident, a shield, a collections of minifigure magnets, and keyring accessories. The Atlantis theme also produced a board game for two to four players titled "Atlantis Treasure", which was released in 2010.

== Attractions ==
In 2010, Lego Summer Camp was located in Atlantis, on Paradise Island on the Bahamas. The attraction was opened by Frankie Jonas (younger brother of the Jonas Brothers). It also included a life-sized figure of a SCUBA diver from the Lego Atlantis line of toys called L.A.N.S.E. (Lego Atlantis Navigational SCUBA Explorer) and Atlantis Kids Adventures (AKA) is an 8,000-square-foot club that takes the idea of personalization to the kids' level, allowing them to choose their own adventure.

In 2011, a ride based on the Atlantis theme was introduced at Legoland Windsor Resort. Atlantis Submarine Voyage combined a dark submarine ride with Sea Life exhibits and was located in the Adventure Land area of the park. The attraction housed a 1 million litre tank that was home to 50 marine species. The ride was refurbished in 2019 and renamed Lego City Deep Sea Adventure.

== Other media ==
In 2010, three books based on the Lego Atlantis theme were released. Lego Atlantis: The Quest for the Lost City and Lego Atlantis: The Menace from the Deep Activity Book were released on 1 April 2010 by Penguin Random House Children's UK. Lego Atlantis Brickmaster was released on 16 August 2010 by DK.

Lego Atlantis: The Movie is a 22-minute animated film that was produced for the Lego Atlantis theme. The storyline follows a group of treasure hunters looking for the lost city of Atlantis. The film was first shown on the Cartoon Network website on January 15, 2010. It was directed by Mark Baldo.

== See also ==
- Lego Legends of Chima
- Nexo Knights
- Lego Ninjago
- Lego Monkie Kid
- Lego Aquazone
- Lego Aqua Raiders
