= Steve Alten =

American science-fiction author

- Born: Steven Robert Alten; August 21, 1959 (age 67); Philadelphia, Pennsylvania, U.S.
- Education: Pennsylvania State University; University of Delaware; Temple University
- Occupation: Author
- Writing career
- Genre: Science fiction
- Website: stevealten.com

Steven Robert Alten (born August 21, 1959) is an American science-fiction author. He is best known for his Meg series of novels set around the fictitious survival of the megalodon, a giant, prehistoric shark.

== Biography ==
Alten holds a bachelor's degree from the Pennsylvania State University, a master's in sports medicine from the University of Delaware, and a doctorate in sports administration from Temple University. Alten is the founder and director of Adopt-An-Author, a nationwide secondary-school free-reading program promoting works from six authors, including his own.

== Bibliography ==
=== Novels ===
Meg series:

1. Meg: Origins (E-Book, 2011)
2. Meg: A Novel of Deep Terror (1997), revised and expanded edition published by Tsunami books in 2005, republished in 2015 as an anniversary edition with the addition of Meg: Origins by Viper Press
3. Meg, Angel of Death: Survival (2020), novella
4. The Trench or The Trench: Meg 2 (1999)
5. Meg: Primal Waters (2004)
6. Meg: Hell's Aquarium (2009)
7. Meg: Nightstalkers (2016)
8. Meg: Generations (2018)
9. Meg: Purgatory (TBA)

Domain or The Mayan trilogy:

1. Domain or The Mayan Prophecy (2001)
2. Resurrection or The Mayan Resurrection (2004)
3. Phobos: Mayan Fear or The Mayan Destiny (2009)

The Loch series:

1. The Loch (2005)
2. Vostok (2015)
3. Heaven's Lake (October 2025)

Stand-alones:

- Fathom (1998)
- Goliath (2002)
- The Shell Game (2007)
- Grim Reaper: End of Days (2010)
- The Omega Project (2013)
- Dog Training the American Male (2013)
- Sharkman (2014)
- Undisclosed (2017)

=== Comics ===
- Meg: The Graphic Novel (2018), with J.S. Earls and Mike S. Miller

=== Screenplays ===
- Mr. Irrelevant

== Adaptations ==
- The Meg, a film adaptation of Meg: A Novel of Deep Terror was released August 10, 2018, after years spent in development hell. It is directed by Jon Turteltaub and stars Jason Statham as Jonas Taylor.
- Meg 2: The Trench is a sequel to the first film and is an adaptation of The Trench. It was released on August 4, 2023, and is directed by Ben Wheatley.
