= Lego Aqua Raiders =

Lego theme

Aqua Raiders
- Subject: Treasure hunting and underwater exploration
- Availability: 2007–2008
- Total sets: 7

Lego Aqua Raiders is a discontinued Lego theme that was launched by The Lego Group in 2007 and discontinued the same year. The theme focused on a team of divers searching for treasure in the Bermuda Triangle. The product line consisted of seven construction toy sets released in the same year.

== Overview ==
The Aqua Raiders product line was based on an original backstory that focused on a team of divers that was sent on a mission to explore hidden treasures on the ocean floor. The Aqua Raiders team was described as the only team that was brave enough to fight the depths of the Bermuda Triangle. Equipped with the latest technology, the team explored the ocean while being attacked by numerous dangerous sea creatures during their underwater descent, including sharks, lobsters and octopuses.

== Background ==
The Aqua Raiders theme originated in an earlier subtheme called Aquazone. The Aquazone theme had been in production from 1995 to 1998 and one of its sub-themes was named Aquaraiders, which consisted of three sets that were released in 1997. Aqua Raiders reappeared ten years later in 2007 as a reinvented standalone theme.

== Construction sets ==
Lego Aqua Raiders released seven toy sets in 2007. The largest set was Aquabase Invasion, the Aqua Raiders' underwater base. The base and underwater vehicles mainly featured a yellow and black colour scheme, while the divers were designed with blue and black wetsuits and blue goggles over black helmets. The Aqua Raiders logo was a blue forked trident.

- (7770) Deep Sea Treasure Hunter - Included two sea snakes, diver, rocks, and sea scooter.
- (7771) Angler Ambush - Included angler fish, two divers, sea scooter, and rock formation.
- (7772) Lobster Strike - Included giant lobster, two divers, and a rover.
- (7773) Tiger Shark Attack - Included tiger shark, two divers, submarine, and large harpoon gun.
- (7774) Crab Crusher - Included giant crab, two divers, large submarine, one mini sub, and a robotic exploration device.
- (7775) Aquabase Invasion - Included giant squid, submarine, sea scooter, four divers, and the aquabase.
- (7776) The Shipwreck - Included two sea snakes, shipwreck, two divers, a skeleton and submarine.

== See also ==
- Lego Atlantis
- Lego Aquazone
- Lego Pirates
