= The Loch (novel) =

Book by Steve Alten

- First edition
- Author: Steve Alten
- Language: English scottish accent
- Genre: Science fiction, Drama, Legal thriller mystery
- Publisher: Tsunami Books
- Publication date: May 2005
- Publication place: United States
- Media type: hardback & paperback
- Pages: 496
- ISBN: 0-9761659-0-2 (Hardback)
- OCLC: 58676841
- Dewey Decimal: 813/.54 22
- LC Class: PS3551.L764 L63 2005
- Followed by: Vostok: Sequel to The Loch; Meg: Nightstalkers

The Loch is a science fiction novel and legal thriller by Steve Alten, and was first published in 2005. The novel is the story of marine biologist Zachary Wallace. A crossover sequel with Alten's Meg series, Vostok, was released in 2015, with a further crossover occurring in Meg: Nightstalkers in 2016. A third book, The Loch: Heaven's Lake is currently unreleased.

== Plot summary ==
This synopsis is told in chronological order, as opposed to the order events happen in the novel.

Shortly after the death of William Wallace, a group of Templar Knights bring his heart to Loch Ness with the intent to hide it in a deep cavern. They are aware that monstrous aquatic creatures use the cavern as a path between the loch and the ocean, so they deliberately block the creatures' path so they can serve as guardians. Each year the Knights will raise and lower a gate that allows several adult creatures to enter but not leave. Believing the monsters are the spawn of Satan and using them makes them complicit, the Knights rename themselves the Black Knights. During the construction of the gate, the monsters kill all but one of the Knights, Wallace's cousin Adam, who escapes and vows to protect the relic.

Hundreds of years later, Scottish-born marine biologist Zachary Wallace, one of Adam's descendants, leads an expedition into the Sargasso Sea in search of a giant squid. However, the expedition meets with disaster when their submersible is attacked by an unseen creature Zachary identifies as the source of the mysterious phenomenon "The Bloop", resulting in the loss of the submersible and its pilot. Left struggling with PTSD and a fear of the water, Zachary is then forced to return to his home on Loch Ness to reconnect with his father Angus, who has been accused of murdering wealthy land developer Johnny Cialino. Once in Scotland, Zachary reunites with his childhood friend True MacDonald and his sister Brandy, with whom Zachary is immediately smitten. During the trial, Angus claims that Johnny was actually killed by the Loch Ness Monster and that Zachary himself was attacked by one as a child. Zachary vehemently denies the claims, but experiences visions of his childhood attack while under scrutiny.

In the following days, several mysterious attacks on Loch Ness eventually force Zachary to admit that although Nessie herself is folklore, he was attacked by a monstrous creature as a child. During his investigations into the loch, Zachary learns that True's father Alban is part of the Black Knights and that his former boss David, who was quick to blame him for the Sargasso incident, is going to lead teams of monster hunters in an expedition to find and capture Nessie. David hires Brandy and her boat to lead his search, which Brandy uses as a means to get even with Zachary for not being open with her about his phobias and feelings. As the search progresses, Zachary learns that the monster has become more violent due to environmental changes in the loch, including an oil leak, and that prior attempts to find it were futile due to active sonar, which aggravates it and sends it deep underwater. Zachary correctly surmises that using passive sonar will find the monster, information he gives to David in exchange for access to the hunters' sonar arrays. David manages to locate the monster, but is killed while trying to trap it in Urquhart Bay, although Zachary is able to save Brandy.

Zachary realizes that the monster is actually a gigantic eel, a distant cousin and predecessor to the Anguilla eel, which was trapped in the loch when bridge construction damaged the Black Knights' gate many years ago. This in turn causes the realization that the Sargasso incident was caused by other giant eels that remained outside the loch. He decides to free the monster after Angus is found guilty of murder, as this would provide the needed evidence to clear his name. Using a dive suit provided by True, Zachary descends into the loch and follows an underground river to the gate, where he discovers the source of the oil leak and is confronted by the monster. Zachary is able to clear the gate blockage successfully and discovers Cialino's corpse, proving Angus's testimony, but is ultimately forced to battle the monster using his ancestor's sword, which he discovers nearby. With help from Angus, True and Alban, Zachary manages to kill the monster, and returns to the surface with enough evidence to overturn Angus's conviction. In the following days, Zachary discovers additional evidence implying that his father did murder Cialino, but keeps it to himself after Angus implies that this was done because Cialino was abusive to his wife and was responsible for polluting the loch.

The novel ends with Zachary and Brandy, now married, leading a successful investigation to find the surviving population of giant eels in the Sargasso Sea. His night terrors have not resurfaced and the two are expecting a child.

== Development ==
While researching the book Alten spent time in Scotland. He consulted cryptozoologists and experts on the legend of the Loch Ness Monster such as Bill McDonald, whose study of Loch Ness prompted Alten to delay the book so he could change some portions to better reflect his findings.

Alten also ran a contest on his website where the winner's name would be used for a character in the novel.

== Release ==
Prior to publishing The Loch Alten had released four books through Tor Books. The books had received middling sales, which Alten had attributed to a lack of promotion. He chose to instead release The Loch through an independent publisher, Tsunami Books, as they promised better publicity. The Loch was first published in hardback in May 2005 through Tsunami Books, and per Alten, received better sales. This was followed up by a paperback edition in 2006, also through Tsunami Books.

In 2009 an illustrated mass market paperback was published, this time through Tor Books, which also published an ebook edition in 2013. An audiobook adaptation narrated by P. J. Ochlan was released in 2016 through Blackstone Audio, and in 2018 Alten published a re-edited collector's edition of the novel that was accompanied by photos, maps, 3D images, and a report on the Loch Ness Monster.

== Reception ==
Ron Bernas of the Detroit Free Press gave the novel 3 stars, noting that while he had some "quibbles" with the book such as the motives of Zach's father Angus and the romance between Zach and Brandy, that its pacing and science made up for this.

== Sequels ==
A crossover sequel with the Alten's Meg series, Vostok, was released in 2015, with a further crossover occurring in Meg: Nightstalkers in 2016. A third book, The Loch: Heaven's Lake, will be published in 2026 or later.

== Film adaptation ==
Film rights to The Loch were purchased in 2007 by Belle Avery, who had also purchased the rights for Alten's The Meg.

== See also ==
- List of underwater science fiction works
