= Lego Aquazone =

Lego theme

Aquazone
- Sub‑themes: Aquanauts, Aquasharks, Aquaraiders, Stingrays, Hydronauts
- Subject: Treasure hunting and underwater exploration
- Availability: 1995–1998
- Total sets: 37

Lego Aquazone is a discontinued Lego theme that was launched by The Lego Group in 1995 and discontinued in 1998. It centred on undersea miners and their enemies searching for crystals. It consisted of submarine vehicles and aquatic animals, with minifigures designed for submarine adventures.

== Overview ==
Aquazone was a Lego product line that focused on undersea adventures. It launched in 1995 with two sub-themes named Aquanauts and Aquasharks, which were released simultaneously. This was followed by the release of three additional sub-themes: Aquaraiders in 1997, Hydronauts in 1998 and Stingrays in 1998. Aqua Raiders was launched later in 2007 as a standalone theme.

== Sub-themes ==
=== Aquanauts (1995–1996) ===
The Aquanauts were the heroes of this sub-theme, which launched in 1995 and continued production until 1996. They were defined as a group of undersea miners. The backstory of the theme focused on the Aquanauts exploring the ocean in search of crystals to investigate their properties. Their base was called the Neptune Discovery Lab. They also used underwater vehicles, such as the Crystal Explorer Sub and the Crystal Crawler to do their work.

- 1728/6145 Crystal Crawler/Aquanaut Turbo Amphi
- 1749/1806 Hydronaut Paravane
- 1822 Sea Claw 7
- 6125 Sea Sprint 9/Aquanaut Octopod
- 6175 Crystal Explorer Sub/Aquanaut DSRV II
- 6195 Neptune Discovery Lab/Aqua Dome 7

=== Aquasharks (1995–1996, 1998) ===
The Aquasharks sub-theme was launched alongside Aquanauts in 1995 and continued until 1998. The Aquasharks were described as a group of scuba-diving bandits that attempted to steal the crystals. They used a variety of underwater vehicles, including the Spy Shark and Deep Sea Predator, which were designed to resemble sharks. The Aquasharks hid their stolen crystals in a cave instead of a base.

- 6100 Aquashark Dart
- 6115 Shark Scout/Aquashark Dart
- 6135 Spy Shark/Aquashark Sneaker
- 6155 Deep Sea Predator/Aquashark Barracuda
- 6190 Shark's Crystal Cave/Aquashark Sea Wolf

=== Aquaraiders (1997) ===
In 1997, the third sub-theme was launched called Aquaraiders. This sub-theme only released three toy sets. The Aquaraiders were designed as a group that searched the ocean floor looking for the crystals with their Scavenger and collecting them with the Aqua Dozer. Their ships were mainly designed with a green and black colour scheme.

- 2160 Crystal Scavenger
- 2161 Aqua Dozer
- 2162 Hydro Reef Wrecker

=== Hydronauts (1998–1999) ===
In 1998, the last year of Aquazone, the Aquanauts and Aquasharks sub-themes were replaced by two additional sub-themes named Hydronauts and Stingrays. The Hydronauts were given a bright colour scheme and were portrayed as the good guys. Their largest ship was the Hydro Search Sub. They also used a ground vehicle to search for crystals.

- 6110 Solo Sub
- 6150/6159 Crystal Detector
- 6180 Hydro Search Sub
- 6199 Hydro Crystalation Station

=== Stingrays (1998) ===
The Stingrays were the enemies of the Hydronauts and had a large underwater vessel called Stormer, which was shaped like a stingray. Their other vessels included the Sea Scorpion and Sea Creeper.

- 6107 Recon Ray
- 6109 Sea Creeper
- 6140 Sea Creeper
- 6160 Sea Scorpion
- 6198 Sting Ray Stormer

=== Aquazone Accessories ===
- 6104 Aquacessories/Aquanauts & Aquasharks

== See also ==
- Lego Atlantis
- Lego Aqua Raiders
- List of underwater science fiction works
