= Meg 2: The Trench =

2023 film by Ben Wheatley

- Theatrical release poster
- Directed by: Ben Wheatley
- Screenplay by: Jon Hoeber; Erich Hoeber; Dean Georgaris
- Story by: Dean Georgaris; Jon Hoeber; Erich Hoeber
- Based on: The Trench by Steve Alten
- Produced by: Lorenzo di Bonaventura; Belle Avery
- Starring: Jason Statham; Wu Jing; Sophia Cai; Page Kennedy; Sergio Peris-Mencheta; Skyler Samuels; Cliff Curtis
- Cinematography: Haris Zambarloukos
- Edited by: Jonathan Amos
- Music by: Harry Gregson-Williams
- Production companies: Flagship Entertainment Group; CMC Pictures; DF Pictures; China Film Co., Ltd.; Alibaba Pictures; Hauser Entertainment; di Bonaventura Pictures; Apelles Entertainment
- Distributed by: Warner Bros. Pictures
- Release dates: June 9, 2023 (SIFF); August 4, 2023 (United States)
- Running time: 116 minutes
- Countries: China; United States
- Language: English · Mandarin
- Budget: $129–139 million
- Box office: $398.5 million

Meg 2: The Trench (Chinese: 巨齿鲨2：深渊; titled Shark 2 in some territories) is a 2023 science fiction action film directed by Ben Wheatley and a sequel to The Meg (2018), based on the 1999 novel The Trench by Steve Alten. Jon Hoeber, Erich Hoeber, and Dean Georgaris all return as writers from the first film, with Jason Statham, Sophia Cai, Page Kennedy, and Cliff Curtis reprising their roles alongside Wu Jing, Sergio Peris-Mencheta, and Skyler Samuels. Like the previous film, it follows a group of scientists who must outrun and outswim the megalodons when a malevolent mining operation threatens their mission and forces them into a high-stakes battle for survival.

Plans for the sequel were announced to be in early development in October 2018 after the box office success of the first film. Principal photography began in February 2022 and lasted until May, occurring in various locations in Asia and Warner Bros. Studios, Leavesden, in Watford, Hertfordshire, England.

Meg 2: The Trench had its premiere at the Shanghai International Film Festival on June 9, 2023, and was released in the United States on August 4, by Warner Bros. Pictures. The film received mixed reviews but was a box office success, grossing $397.8 million worldwide.

== Plot ==
Five years after the events of the first film, Jonas Taylor has been involved in fighting environmental crimes while helping Mana One explore the Mariana Trench, where the Megalodon had been found. Following the death of Jonas' wife Suyin Zhang, he has been raising her teenage daughter Meiying alongside her uncle, Suyin's brother, Jiuming Zhang, who acquired his father's company with financial backing from wealthy industrialist Hillary Driscoll. Mana One has been studying an 80 ft (24 m) female Meg called Haiqi who was discovered as a pup and trained by Jiuming in a reserve in Hainan.

Jonas and Jiuming lead a routine submersible exploration to the Trench. Fellow Meg survivors DJ and Mac observe them from Mana One. On the way down, the subs are pursued by Haiqi, who escaped captivity the previous night. The subs dive through the thermocline in an attempt to escape but Haiqi forces her way down through it anyway. Down below, they encounter two much larger Megs, a massive alpha male and a beta male, who mate with Haiqi. Jiuming realizes that Haiqi had been acting strange because it is mating season; she was calling the other Megs to mate. Venturing further down, the team stumbles across an illegal oceanic mining operation captained by mercenary Montes, who has a vendetta against Jonas for his imprisonment some time before. Montes' crew was hired by the corrupt Driscoll to use Mana One's access to the Trench to mine rare-earth minerals that could earn them billions. Montes kills his crew in an explosion to cover up their activities, which causes a rupture in the Trench and grounds the team's ships.

DJ, Mac, and Mana One analyst Jess discover that the rescue pod has been sabotaged, forcing the crew to use exosuits to walk toward Montes' station, with only four of them surviving the journey. Jess reveals herself as a traitor and attempts to remotely kill the four, but they escape in a submersible. As the crew surfaces, they discover that the rupture from earlier has caused several Trench creatures, including the three Megs, lizard-like creatures known as Snappers and a giant octopus to escape to the surface.

Jess is devoured by a Meg; Jonas’ team escapes to a nearby resort, Fun Island. Driscoll, Montes, and the mercenaries arrive at Fun Island to kill Jonas' crew, but are attacked by the Snappers, who eat Driscoll. As the Megs and octopus attack, Jonas kills the beta Meg and knocks Montes into the mouth of the alpha Meg to be eaten when Montes attacks him.

Jiuming injures the octopus, attracting Haiqi, who kills the octopus. Jonas uses a helicopter rotor from Driscoll's crashed helicopter to fatally impale the alpha Meg. Haiqi heads towards Jonas, Jiuming, and Mac, but Jiuming uses his training signals to redirect her. As the group celebrates their survival, they realize the possibility that Haiqi is pregnant.

== Cast ==
- Jason Statham as Jonas Taylor, Meiying's stepfather and the husband of the late Suyin Zhang
- Wu Jing as Jiuming Zhang, Meiying's uncle
- Sophia Cai as Meiying, Jiuming's niece and Jonas's stepdaughter
- Cliff Curtis as Mac, Mana One operations manager
- Page Kennedy as DJ, an engineer at Mana One
- Sergio Peris Mencheta as Montes, a mercenary in charge of illegal mining operations
- Skyler Samuels as Jess, a Mana One worker
- Melissanthi Mahut as Rigas, a security officer at Mana One
- Whoopie Van Raam as Curtis, a diver at Mana One
- Kiran Sonia Sawar as Sal, a diver at Mana One
- Felix Mayr as Lance, a diver at Mana One
- Sienna Guillory as Hilary Driscoll, a billionaire investor who is financing Jiuming's efforts in the Mana One

== Production ==
=== Development ===
In April 2018, Jason Statham said a sequel to The Meg (2018) would happen if the film did well with the public, saying: "I think it's like anything in this day and age – if it makes money, there's an appetite to make more money. And if it doesn't do well, they'll soon sweep it under the carpet--but that's the way Hollywood works." In August 2018, Steve Alten said, "My feeling has always been that this is a billion dollar franchise if it were done right. But to be done right you had to get the shark, get the cast right, get the tone. And Warner Bros. has nailed it completely. The producers have nailed it." In October 2018, executive producer Catherine Xujun Ying announced a sequel was in the early stages of development.

=== Pre-production ===
In March 2019, it was announced that a script for the film was in the works, with screenwriters Dean Georgaris and Jon and Erich Hoeber returning. In his September 2020 newsletter, Alten confirmed the script, titled Meg 2: The Trench, to be complete, and expressed interest in its "dark" tone. In October 2020, British genre filmmaker Ben Wheatley was announced to direct.

=== Filming ===
In April 2021, Statham said filming was set to begin in January 2022. Filming commenced as planned at the end of January at the Warner-owned Leavesden Studios outside London, with principal photography starting on February 4, 2022. It continued there until May before switching to outdoor locations, presumably in Asia. While the production was ongoing, Sienna Guillory, Skyler Samuels, Sergio Peris-Mencheta, and Wu Jing were announced as part of the cast. The Fun Island scenes were filmed at Paradise Beach in Phuket, Thailand, where the crew built a wooden pier that juts out into the sea 200 m (660 ft). Some scenes were also filmed at Than Bok Khorani National Park in Krabi and a studio in Samut Prakan.

=== Post-production ===
DNEG, Scanline VFX and Milk VFX provided the visual effects for the sequel (with DNEG also handling the 3D conversion). Pete Bebb and Gavin Round served as production visual effects supervisor and production visual effects producer respectively.

== Music ==
Harry Gregson-Williams composed the score for the sequel, returning from the first film. WaterTower Music released a score album on July 28, in addition to the Bankay Ojo's remix version of Page Kennedy's song "Chomp."

All music is composed by Harry Gregson-Williams.

No.	Title	Length
1.	"Into the Trench"	6:14
2.	"Rescue Approach"	4:25
3.	"Fun Island"	4:11
4.	"Fighting Montes"	2:23
5.	"Sea Dino Attack"	5:22
6.	"Octopus Attack"	2:49
7.	"Across the Four Seas"	6:26
8.	"Monster vs. Monster"	3:22
9.	"All Systems Down"	3:48
10.	"Close Call"	4:14
11.	"Shark Kill"	1:53
12.	"Reunited with Meiying"	2:29
13.	"Chomp (Bankey Ojo Remix) (Page Kennedy)"	3:39
Total length:		51:15

== Release ==
=== Theatrical ===
Meg 2: The Trench was released by Warner Bros. Pictures in the United States on August 4, 2023. The film had its world premiere at the Shanghai International Film Festival on June 9, 2023.

=== Home media ===
Meg 2: The Trench was released on digital download on August 25, 2023, on the streaming service Max on September 29, and was released on Ultra HD Blu-ray, Blu-ray and DVD on October 24, 2023, by Warner Bros. Home Entertainment.

== Reception ==
=== Box office ===
Meg 2: The Trench grossed $82.6 million in the United States and Canada, and $315.2 million in other territories, for a worldwide total of $397.8 million.

In the United States and Canada, Meg 2: The Trench was projected to gross $20–30 million from 3,503 theaters in its opening weekend. It made $12 million on its first day, including $3.2 million from Thursday night previews. It went on to debut to $30 million, finishing second behind holdover Barbie. The film made $12.8 million and $6.7 million in its second and third weekends, finishing in fourth and sixth, respectively.

=== Critical response ===
On the review aggregator website Rotten Tomatoes, 27% of 184 critics' reviews are positive, with an average rating of 4.5/10. The website's consensus reads: "It isn't without its fun moments, but Meg 2: The Trench suffers from a disjointed story that drifts for too long before finally delivering a few campy thrills." Metacritic, which uses a weighted average, assigned the film a score of 40 out of 100, based on 38 critics, indicating "mixed or average" reviews. Audiences surveyed by CinemaScore gave the film an average grade of "B–" on an A+ to F scale, while those polled at PostTrak gave it an 72% overall positive score, with 55% saying they would definitely recommend the film.

In a negative review, RogerEbert.com's Brian Tallerico gave one out of four stars, and wrote, "At least until the final half-hour, when he's finally free to unleash some monstrous chaos, this is one of the dullest films of the year, a plodding, poorly made giant shark movie that inexplicably lets the giant shark take a backseat to an evil underwater drilling operation." Robbie Collin of The Daily Telegraph earned a two out of five rating, stating that "Meg 2, by design, is a completely anonymous bag of lukewarm McDonald's – it's hard to be mad at it, but only because nothing in it stands out enough to get mad at."

Richard Lawson wrote in Vanity Fair, "Meg 2 is confident in its schlock, piling on one ridiculous conceit after another at such a pace that the audience can't help but be swept up in it. That is a harder needle to thread than many filmmakers seem to think — it's not enough to just be stupid."

=== Accolades ===
At the 44th Golden Raspberry Awards, the film was nominated for Worst Picture, Worst Actor for Statham and Worst Director for Wheatley.

== Future ==
In July 2023, Wheatley stated there had been internal discussions about a potential third installment. While its development depends on the success of Meg 2: The Trench, he hopes to continue the story as outlined in the novels, by Steve Alten.

== See also ==
- List of underwater science fiction works
