= The Meg =

2018 film by Jon Turteltaub

- Theatrical release poster
- Directed by: Jon Turteltaub
- Screenplay by: Dean Georgaris; Jon Hoeber; Erich Hoeber
- Based on: Meg by Steve Alten
- Produced by: Lorenzo di Bonaventura; Belle Avery; Colin Wilson
- Starring: Jason Statham; Li Bingbing; Rainn Wilson; Ruby Rose; Winston Chao; Cliff Curtis
- Cinematography: Tom Stern
- Edited by: Steven Kemper; Kelly Matsumoto
- Music by: Harry Gregson-Williams
- Production companies: Gravity Pictures; Di Bonaventura Pictures; Apelles Entertainment; Hauser Entertainment; Maeday Productions; Flagship Entertainment Group
- Distributed by: Warner Bros. Pictures
- Release date: August 10, 2018 (United States)
- Running time: 113 minutes
- Countries: United States; China
- Languages: English; Mandarin
- Budget: $130–178 million
- Box office: $529 million

The Meg is a 2018 science fiction action film directed by Jon Turteltaub from a screenplay by Dean Georgaris, Jon Hoeber, and Erich Hoeber, loosely based on the 1997 novel Meg: A Novel of Deep Terror by Steve Alten. The film stars Jason Statham, Li Bingbing, Rainn Wilson, Ruby Rose, Winston Chao, and Cliff Curtis. In the plot, a group of scientists encounters a 75-foot-long (23 m) megalodon while on a rescue mission on the floor of the Pacific Ocean.

Walt Disney Studios originally purchased the film rights to the novel in the 1990s, but the film spent years in development hell. The rights eventually landed at Warner Bros. Pictures, and the film was green-lit in 2013. Turteltaub and much of the cast joined by September 2014. Principal photography began in October 2016 and lasted until January 2017, occurring in New Zealand and China.

The Meg was released in the United States on August 10, 2018. The film received mixed reviews from critics and grossed $529 million worldwide against a production budget of $130–178 million. A sequel, Meg 2: The Trench, was released in 2023.

== Plot ==
Jonas Taylor is a rescue diver who attempts to save the crew of a damaged nuclear submarine as the hull is being rammed by an unidentified creature. Two of his crew members become trapped in the sub, and Jonas sees that attempting rescue would result in the deaths of everyone they have already saved, so at the cost of the loss of two of his colleagues, he leads them to safety. When he tells his story later, it is dismissed by another survivor, Dr. Heller, who denounces him, saying that he was psychotic.

Five years later, billionaire Jack Morris meets Dr. Minway Zhang at the underwater research facility Mana One, which Morris is funding. Zhang and his oceanographer daughter Suyin supervise a mission to explore a deeper section of the Mariana Trench, previously concealed by a thermocline of hydrogen sulfide. The submersible is piloted by Japanese scientist Toshi, American scientist "The Wall," and Jonas' ex-wife Lori. They are attacked and trapped by a large creature.

Zhang and Jonas' old friend and Mana One operations manager, James "Mac" Mackreides, venture to Thailand to recruit Jonas, now a loner. Suyin attempts the rescue but is attacked by a giant squid that is subsequently killed by an enormous shark. Jonas goes down to save the crew; Toshi sacrifices himself to help the others escape.

The Mana One crew discovers that the giant shark is a Megalodon or "Meg", a prehistoric species of shark previously believed to be extinct for over two million years. When they realize Meg has escaped the thermocline, they resolve to kill it, knowing modern humans are unequipped to deal with such an ancient, powerful creature. After Jonas marks it with a tracker, Suyin enters a shark-proof tank to shoot the Meg with poison, which succeeds in killing the creature.

However, a second, larger Meg (revealed to be the one they encountered in the trench) emerges, devouring The Wall and the dead Meg. It critically wounds Zhang, and Dr. Heller sacrifices himself to save another crew member. Zhang dies on the way to rescue.

Morris tells the crew that he has informed all neighboring governments about the Meg and they are sending military units to handle the Meg. However, hoping to keep the Meg a secret, he instead enlists a mercenary team to kill the Meg with depth charges. The team fails, and the Meg eats Morris.

Jonas and the surviving crew members learn that Morris lied - no military ships are coming to help them. They decide to kill the Meg themselves and with apprehension plot the destination of Megs's route of travel, Sanya Bay, a China beach crowded with swimmers.

The Meg attacks swimmers at Sanya Bay. The crew lures it away with recorded whale sounds, An undersea fight ensues and Jonas wounds the Meg with his submersible and stabs it in the eye, crippling it. Its blood attracts a shiver of modern sharks that devour the dying Meg. Jonas and the crew celebrate their survival.

== Cast ==
- Jason Statham as Jonas Taylor, a diver who specializes in deep sea search and rescue
- Li Bingbing as Suyin, an oceanographer aboard the research vessel Mana
- Rainn Wilson as Morris, a billionaire funding the Mana
- Cliff Curtis as Mac, the managing researcher of the Mana
- Winston Chao as Zhang, Suyin's father and Meiying's grandfather
- Sophia Cai as Meiying, Suyin’s 8-year-old daughter and Minway's granddaughter
- Ruby Rose as Jaxx, an engineer aboard the Mana
- Page Kennedy as DJ, an engineer aboard the Mana
- Robert Taylor as Heller, a medical doctor aboard the Mana
- Ólafur Darri Ólafsson as The Wall, a member of Lori's crew
- Jessica McNamee as Lori, a diver and submarine pilot aboard the Mana, and Jonas' ex-wife
- Masi Oka as Toshi, a member of Lori’s crew

== Production ==
Disney's Hollywood Pictures initially acquired the rights to the novel in 1996. Around that time, Tom Wheeler was hired to adapt the book into a screenplay, but, having decided that his script was not good enough, the studio hired Jeffrey Boam to write a new draft. Boam's script was later rejected for the same reason. By 1999, the project had stalled, and the rights reverted to Steve Alten, the book's author.

In 2005, reports surfaced that the project was being developed by New Line Cinema, with an estimated budget of $75 million and a slated release of summer 2006. Names attached to the production included Jan de Bont as director, Guillermo del Toro as producer, and Shane Salerno as a screenwriter. However, New Line later canceled the project due to budgetary concerns. The rights reverted to Alten again, but the film remained in development hell.

In 2015, it was announced that the film was now moving forward at Warner Bros., with a new script written by Dean Georgaris. By June of that year, Eli Roth was reported to be in talks to direct, but due to creative differences, Roth was replaced by Jon Turteltaub in early 2016. Jason Statham and much of the cast joined in August and September 2016.

The film is an American and Chinese co-production. It was considered a full co-production under Chinese regulations, and it was not subject to the same quota system and revenue sharing agreements usually applied to imported films.

Principal photography on the film began on October 13, 2016, in West Auckland, New Zealand. Filming ended on January 4, 2017, in Sanya City of Hainan, China. Visual effects were done by Sony Pictures Imageworks, Image Engine, and Scanline VFX. The visual effects team was challenged with designing a previously undiscovered prehistoric giant shark and designing the underwater environments and atmospherics, including realistic coral reefs, bubbles, and other sea life. The film was converted to 3D in post-production by Legend3D. Harry Gregson-Williams's score was recorded at Synchron Stage in Vienna, Austria.

== Release ==
Released by Gravity Pictures in China and Warner Bros. Pictures in the United States, the film was initially scheduled to be released on March 2, 2018. Warner and Gravity then said that the film would be released during the 2018 Chinese New Year period in China, a week-long annual holiday on February 16, 2018. The film was later pushed back from its original release date of March 2, 2018, to August 10, 2018. The studio spent $140 million on global prints and advertisements for the film.

== Home media ==
The Meg was released for digital download on October 30, 2018, and on Ultra HD Blu-ray, Blu-ray 3D, Blu-ray, and DVD on November 13. As of August 2020, it is available to stream on Amazon Prime in the United Kingdom as well as Hulu in the United States as of May 2023. It is also available on Amazon Prime in the United States.

== Reception ==
=== Box office ===
The Meg grossed $145 million in the United States and Canada and $384 million in other territories, for a total worldwide gross of $529 million, against a production budget between $130–178 million. Deadline Hollywood reported the film needed to gross around $400 million in order to break even.

In the United States and Canada, it was initially projected to gross $20–22 million from 4,119 theaters in its opening weekend. The film made $4 million from Thursday night previews, leading analysts to predict it would outperform its low $20 million projections. After making $16.5 million on its first day, weekend estimates were raised to $40 million. It went on to debut at $45.4 million, topping the box office and marking the best solo opening of Statham's career, as well as Turteltaub's. It made $21.5 million in its second weekend and $13 million in its third, finishing second behind Crazy Rich Asians both times.

The film debuted to $101.5 million from 96 countries in other territories, for a worldwide opening of $146.9 million. In China, a co-producer of the film grossed $50.3 million from 12,650 screens and ranked 3 in the opening weekend. Other top openings were Mexico ($6.2 million), Russia ($5 million), the United Kingdom ($4.4 million), Spain ($2.4 million), and the Philippines ($2 million).

=== Critical response ===
On Rotten Tomatoes, the film holds an approval rating of 47% based on 311 reviews, with an average rating of 5.3/10. The site's critics consensus reads, "The Meg sets audiences up for a good old-fashioned B-movie creature feature, but lacks the genre thrills—or the cheesy bite—to make it worth diving in." On Metacritic, the film has a weighted average score of 46 out of 100, based on 46 critics, indicating "mixed or average reviews". Audiences surveyed by CinemaScore gave the film an average grade of "B+" on an A+ to F scale, while those polled by PostTrak gave it an average 3 out of 5 stars.

Owen Gleiberman of Variety gave the film a mixed review, calling it "neither good enough—nor bad enough," and writing, "The Meg, a rote sci-fi horror adventure film that features a shark the size of a blue whale, comes on like it wants to be the mother of all deep-sea attack movies. But it's really just the mother of all generically pandering, totally unsurprising Jaws ripoffs."

Scott Mendelson of Forbes was impressed by the film's special effects and called it "a polished B movie that delivers the goods." At the same time, IGN's William Bibbiani praised the performances of the cast, particularly Statham.

Writing for The Hollywood Reporter, Simon Abrams said the film was "refreshingly unpretentious" and "a breath of fresh air" compared with the Sharknado series.

=== Accolades ===
The Meg won Golden Fleece at the 2018 Golden Trailer Awards, and received nominations for Best Home Ent Horror/Thriller and Best Billboard the following year. It was nominated for a Golden Raspberry Award in Worst Prequel, Remake, Rip-off, or Sequel (as a ripoff of Jaws).

== Sequel ==
In April 2018, Jason Statham said a Meg sequel would happen if the film did well with the public saying, "I think it's like anything in this day and age—if it makes money, there's an appetite to make more money. And if it doesn't do well, they'll soon sweep it under the carpet. But that's the way Hollywood works." That August, Steve Alten said, "My feeling has always been that this is a billion-dollar franchise if it was done right. But to be done right, you had to get the shark right, get the cast right, get the tone right. And Warner Bros. has nailed it completely. The producers have nailed it."

In October 2018, executive producer Catherine Xujun Ying said a sequel was in the early stages of development. In March 2019, a script for the film was in the works. In his September 2020 newsletter, Steve Alten confirmed the script, titled Meg 2: The Trench, was complete, and expressed interest in its "dark" tone. British director Ben Wheatley signed on to direct. In April 2021, Statham said that he believed that filming would begin in January 2022. Production officially began at Warner Bros. Studios in Leavesden in February 2022, with screenwriters Dean Georgaris, Erich Hoeber, and Jon Hoeber returning, and Statham and Li reprising their roles from the first film. In March 2022, it was announced that the film would be released on August 4, 2023.

== See also ==
- List of natural horror films
- List of underwater science fiction works
- The Meg (soundtrack)
