= Transatlantic tunnel =

Proposals for a tunnel between Europe and North America

A transatlantic tunnel is a theoretical tunnel that would span the Atlantic Ocean between North America and Europe possibly for such purposes as mass transit. Some proposals envision technologically advanced trains reaching speeds of 300 to 5,000 miles per hour (500 to 8,000 km/h). Most conceptions of the tunnel envision it between the United States and the United Kingdom ‒ or more specifically between New York City and London.

== Proposed tunnels ==
Many variations of the concept exist, including a tube above the seabed, a tunnel beneath the ocean floor, or some combination of the two.

=== Vactrain ===
A 1960s proposal has a 3,100-mile (5,000 km) near-vacuum tube with vactrains, a theoretical type of maglev train, which could travel at speeds up to 5,000 miles per hour (8,000 km/h). At this speed, the travel-time between New York City and London would be less than one hour. Another modern variation, intended to reduce costs, is a submerged floating tunnel about 160 feet (50 m) below the ocean surface, in order to avoid ships, bad weather, and the high pressure associated with a much deeper tunnel near the sea bed. It would consist of 54,000 prefabricated sections held in place by 100,000 tethering cables. Each section would consist of a layer of foam sandwiched between concentric steel tubes, and the tunnel would also have reduced air pressure.

=== Jet propulsion ===
Ideas proposing rocket, jet, scramjet, and air-pressurized tunnels for train transportation have also been put forward. In the proposal described in an Extreme Engineering episode, trains would take 18 minutes to reach top speed, and 18 minutes at the end to come to a halt. During the deceleration phase, the resultant 0.2 g acceleration would lead to an unpleasant feeling of tilting downward, and it was proposed that the seats would individually rotate to face backwards at the midpoint of the journey, in order to make the deceleration more pleasant.

== History ==
=== Early interest ===
Suggestions for such a structure go back to Michel Verne, son of Jules Verne, who wrote about it in 1888 in a story entitled Un Express de l'avenir (An Express of the Future). This story was published in English in Strand Magazine in 1895, where it was incorrectly attributed to Jules Verne, a mistake frequently repeated today. 1913 saw the publication of the novel Der Tunnel by German author Bernhard Kellermann. It inspired four films of the same name: one in 1915 by William Wauer, and separate German, French, and British versions released in 1933 and 1935. The German and French versions were directed by Curtis Bernhardt, and the British one was written in part by science fiction writer Curt Siodmak. Perhaps suggesting contemporary interest in the topic, an original poster for the American release of the British version (renamed Transatlantic Tunnel) was, in 2006, estimated for auction at $2,000–3,000.

=== Modern research ===
Robert H. Goddard, the father of rocketry, was issued 2 of his 214 patents for the idea. Arthur C. Clarke mentioned intercontinental tunnels in his 1946 short story Rescue Party and again in his 1956 novel The City and the Stars. Harry Harrison's 1975 novel Tunnel Through the Deeps (also published as A Transatlantic Tunnel, Hurrah!) describes a vacuum/maglev system on the ocean floor. The April 2004 issue of Popular Science suggests that a transatlantic tunnel is more feasible than previously thought, and without major engineering challenges. It compares it favorably with laying transatlantic pipes and cables, but with a cost of $88 to 175 billion. In 2003, the Discovery Channel's show Extreme Engineering aired a program, titled "Transatlantic Tunnel", which discussed the proposed tunnel concept in detail.

== Obstacles ==
In the United States, nativist groups expressed opposition to a Transatlantic tunnel in 1929 during the Roman Question. Groups including the Ku Klux Klan spread rumors that the tunnel was really planned to be used to bring the "Imprisoned" Pope to the United States, where he would rule the country, ban Bible reading except in Latin (which most Americans couldn't read), close public schools, and transform the Protestant nation into a Catholic one via mass immigration from Ireland, Italy, Poland and elsewhere.

Anti-Catholic rumors persisted after the Pope was granted sovereignty over Vatican City in 1929. During John F. Kennedy's 1960 presidential campaign, it was reported that people in West Virginia still found these rumors credible, despite the decline of 19th and 20th century Romanism panic.

== See also ==
- Gravity train
