= Tunnel Through the Deeps =

1972 novel by Harry Harrison

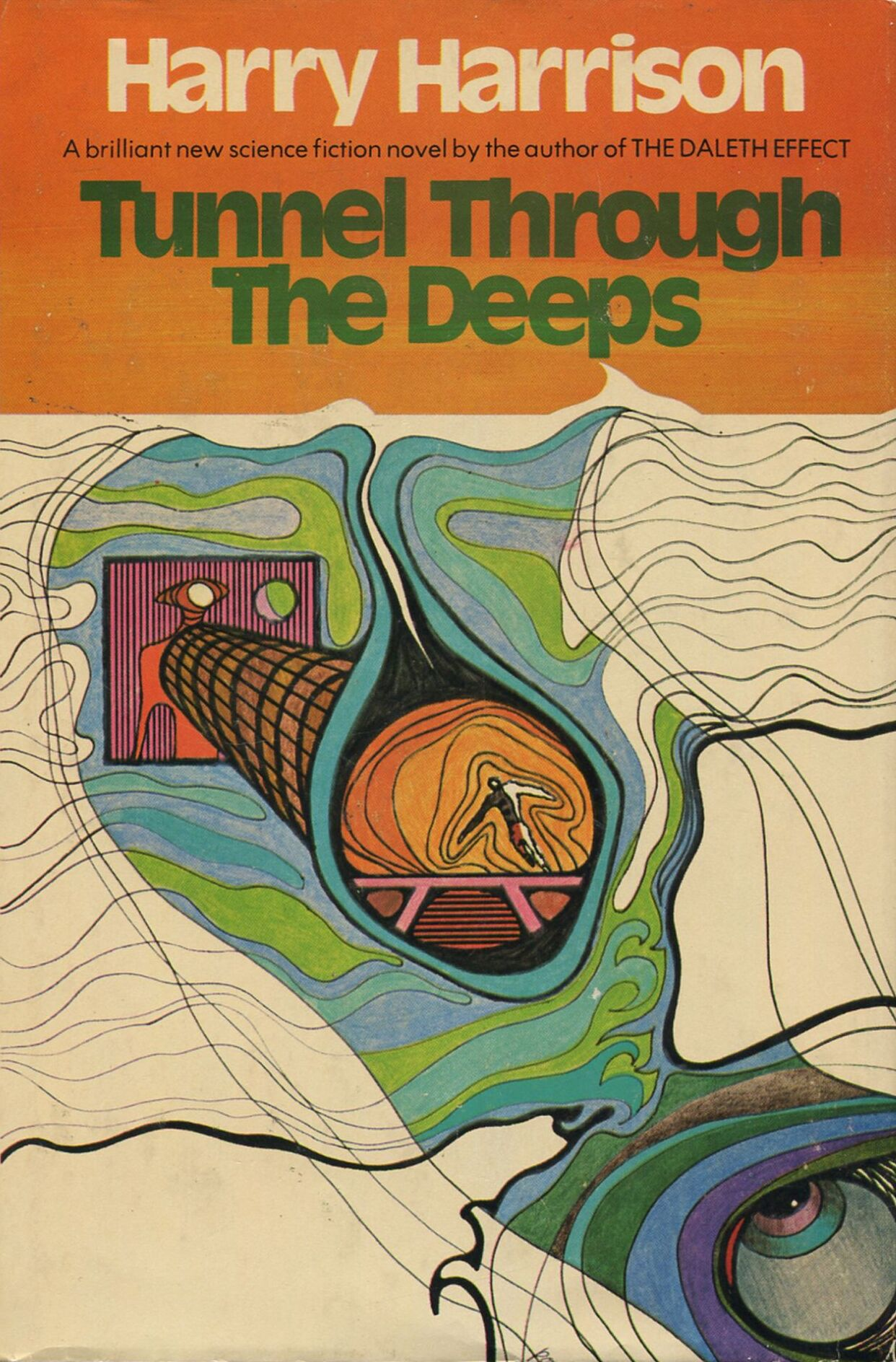
- First book edition
- Author: Harry Harrison
- Cover artist: Richard M. Powers
- Language: English
- Genre: Alternate history/Science fiction
- Set in: United States, England
- Publisher: Putnam
- Publication date: 1972
- Publication place: United States
- Media type: print
- Pages: 174
- ISBN: 0425025659

Tunnel Through the Deeps (also published as A Transatlantic Tunnel, Hurrah!) is a 1972 alternate history/science fiction novel by American writer Harry Harrison. It was serialized in Analog magazine beginning in the April 1972 issue.

The title refers to the construction of a submerged floating-tube pontoon bridge/tunnel across the Atlantic Ocean in the novel.

== Plot summary ==
In an alternative history, the United States lost the American Revolutionary War and George Washington was executed for treason. Thus, America in 1973 is still under the control of the British Empire. The divergence point between this world and our own occurred far earlier, however, when the Moors won the Battle of Las Navas de Tolosa on the Iberian Peninsula, on July 16, 1212. Thus it was that Spain was unable to become unified, owing to the survival of an Islamic presence in its territory, and therefore could not finance the expedition of Christopher Columbus in 1492. Instead, it was John Cabot who discovered America, just a few years later.

The protagonist, Captain Augustine Washington, is a direct descendant of George Washington, and labors in his 'traitorous' shadow. Captain Washington and Sir Isambard Brassey-Brunel (descendant of Isambard Kingdom Brunel) get together to link the heart of the British Empire with its far-flung Atlantic colony in North America, although they fall out over Augustine's wooing of Isambard's young daughter, Iris, and as a result of disputes over engineering techniques. However, after a number of adventures the two are reconciled on Sir Isambard's deathbed, and the lovers later marry. After the completion of the tunnel, the American colonies are granted their independence.

Detective Richard Tracy also makes an appearance, as do 'Lord' Amis and 'Reverend' Aldiss. An appearance in connection with a suborbital rocket is also made by an expert (who prefers a mechanical Babbage machine for computing to the electronic kind) named Arthur C. Clarke.

== Reception ==
The novel received numerous reviews:

- Review by Richard E. Geis in Science Fiction Review (then titled Richard E. Geis), August 1972
- Review by Lester del Rey in Worlds of If, September–October 1972
- Review by P. Schuyler Miller in Analog Science Fiction/Science Fact, October 1972
- Review by John Bowles in Vector, no. 64
- Review by George Hay in Foundation, no. 4, July 1973
- Review by Lynne Holdom in Science Fiction Review, November 1975
- Review by David Wingrove in Vector, no. 78
- Review by Ben Ostrander in The Space Gamer, December 1975–January 1976
- Uncredited review in Vector, no. 214 (2000)
- Review by Armin Möhle in Phantastisch!, no. 62 (in German)
- Review by Christian Hoffmann in Phantastisch!, no. 72 (in German)
- Review by Marek Łacisz (1998) in Talizman #4-5 1998, p. 140-141 (in Polish)

== See also ==
- List of underwater science fiction works
- Pontoon bridge
- Transatlantic tunnel
- Der Tunnel, a novel on the same subject published in April 1913 by Bernhard Kellermann
