= The Tunnel (1935 film) =

1935 British film by Maurice Elvey

- Poster for the American release
- Directed by: Maurice Elvey
- Written by: Curt Siodmak; L. du Garde Peach; Clemence Dane
- Based on: The Tunnel; 1913 novel by Bernhard Kellermann
- Produced by: Michael Balcon
- Starring: Richard Dix; Leslie Banks; Madge Evans; Helen Vinson; C. Aubrey Smith; Basil Sydney
- Cinematography: Günther Krampf
- Edited by: Charles Frend
- Music by: Hubert Bath (uncredited)
- Distributed by: Gaumont British
- Release dates: 27 October 1935 (United States); 11 November 1935 (United Kingdom)
- Running time: 94 minutes
- Country: United Kingdom
- Language: English

The Tunnel (U.S. title: Transatlantic Tunnel) is a 1935 British science fiction film directed by Maurice Elvey and starring Richard Dix, Leslie Banks, Madge Evans, Helen Vinson, C. Aubrey Smith and Basil Sydney. It is based on the 1913 novel The Tunnel by Bernhard Kellermann, about the building of a transatlantic tunnel between New York and London. The script was written by Curt Siodmak, L. du Garde Peach and Clemence Dane. The film, produced at a time when the threat of war loomed in Europe, emphasized international cooperation between the United States and the United Kingdom.

== Plot ==
A group of wealthy industrialists gather at the home of Mr. Lloyd, a millionaire who introduces them to Richard "Mack" McAllan, the engineer who successfully spearheaded the construction of the Channel Tunnel (the story takes place in the unspecified near-future, though it is noted in the film that the Channel Tunnel is built "in 1940") and so is the Bahamas-Miami tunnel. McAllan informs the group that the "Allanite steel" he developed, along with a "radium drill" developed by his friend Frederick "Robbie" Robbins, makes it possible to construct an undersea tunnel linking England with the United States. Though the group is initially skeptical, the backing of Lloyd and his associate Mostyn convinces the group to buy shares in the project.

Three years into construction of the tunnel, McAllan is a worldwide celebrity, but his work keeps him from his devoted wife Ruth and their young son Geoffrey. Called away to New York, he is informed that the people are losing faith in the project. Lloyd needs to have him use his fame to get support. Lloyd's attractive daughter Varlia, who is secretly in love with McAllan, keeps him company to intensify the attention of the press.

The photos of the couple add to Ruth's sense of isolation, and she decides to work in the tunnel as a nurse. There she is affected by an unknown gas afflicting the workers and loses her eyesight. Worried that her husband no longer loves her and not wanting him to stay with her out of pity, Ruth leaves McAllan, taking their son with her. Heartbroken at her unexplained departure, McAllan throws himself into the project, alienating Robbins in the process.

Years pass. Though the cost of the tunnel in lives and money continues to mount, the British prime minister and American president eagerly anticipate its completion and the unity and peace they promise it will bring. Ruth lives in the countryside with her now-grown son, who lobbies Robbins to find him a job working in the tunnel. The tunnel is nearing completion, but the workers encounter a submarine volcano that will necessitate a detour. McAllan needs more money to establish a detour, but is opposed by Grellier, an arms manufacturer, and Mostyn. The two men earlier manipulated the stock market to become the controlling shareholders in the company. Lloyd suspects that Grellier and Mostyn plan to use the delay to depress stock prices again, and this time gain total ownership of the tunnel. However, Varlia convinces Mostyn to fund further construction by promising him the one thing he has always wanted, but never gotten: her hand in marriage. Though the project goes forward, Grellier has Mostyn killed for backing out of their deal.

Despite the renewed effort, samples indicate the volcano may be too large to drill around. The drill breaks through to volcanic gases that kill hundreds of workers, including Geoffrey. The project seems on the verge of collapse. Determined to see the project through and fortified by the reappearance of Ruth (who came to the tunnel site to discover Geoffrey's fate), McAllan vows to continue. With three volunteers, McAllan and Robbins man the radium drill, and despite near-fatal temperatures, break through to the American side of the tunnel.

== Cast ==
- Richard Dix as Richard "Mack" McAllan
- Leslie Banks as Frederick "Robbie" Robbins
- Madge Evans as Ruth McAllan
- Helen Vinson as Varlia Lloyd
- C. Aubrey Smith as Lloyd
- Basil Sydney as Mostyn
- Henry Oscar as Grellier
- Hilda Trevelyan as Mary
- Walter Huston as President of the United States
- Cyril Raymond as Harriman
- George Arliss as Prime Minister of Great Britain
- Jimmy Hanley as Geoffrey McAllan

== Production ==
Bernhard Kellermann's 1913 novel The Tunnel previously had been filmed three times: once as the German silent Der Tunnel (1915), and then as two sound films Der Tunnel (German) and Le Tunnel (French), both released in 1933 and directed by Curtis Bernhardt. The Tunnel used footage extensively from the 1933 German version.

A first draft of the screenplay written by Sidney Gilliat was discarded. Clemence Dane, who provided additional dialogue, was the pseudonym of Winifred Ashton, an English novelist and playwright who later won an Academy Award for Best Story for Perfect Strangers (1945).

The New York City opening of The Tunnel took place on 27 October 1935.

== Critical reception ==
The Monthly Film Bulletin wrote: "It is a sound film-subject, acceptably if not perfectly treated. The futuristic settings are chiefly limited to house-interiors with television as freely employed as the modern telephone and to various parts of the interior of the tunnel. On the whole they are good; the mistake of putting a crude over-emphasis on spectacular detail has been for the most part avoided. Model-shots have been used with effect and the photography and lighting throughout are first-class. ...In the story, however, the love-interest bulks much too large, moving heavily and without conviction along conventional lines. The dialogue, too, is often feeble and unnatural; and the continuity is not without its notable loose ends. Much is said incidentally about the value of the tunnel in bringing about world-peace, but how it will actually do so is left vague. ...Nevertheless the film deserves attention; it is an interesting and measurably successful experiment in a genre which deserves to be further explored, though with care."

The New York Times called it an "arresting and strikingly mounted British film," and "An imaginative drama in the best Jules Verne tradition."

== See also ==
- List of underwater science fiction works
- Transatlantic tunnel
- Tatra 77, an advanced Czechoslovak automobile used in the film by director Maurice Elvey, who was taken with its then-futuristic look
