= List of Thunderbirds Are Go episodes =

Thunderbirds Are Go is an animated science fiction television programme produced by ITV Studios and Pukeko Pictures. It is a reboot of the series Thunderbirds created by Gerry and Sylvia Anderson which follows the exploits of International Rescue (IR), a rescue organisation run by the Tracy family out of their secret island base in the Pacific Ocean. They use technologically advanced craft for land, sea, air and space rescues in their operations, the most important of which are a set of vehicles called the Thunderbirds, piloted by the five Tracy brothers.

The programme premiered on 4 April 2015 and concluded on 22 February 2020, running for 78 episodes across three series.

== Series overview ==
| Series | Episodes | | Originally released | |
| Series | Episodes | | First released | Last released |
|---|---|---|---|---|
| 1 | 26 | 13 | 4 April 2015 | 20 June 2015 |
| 1 | 26 | 13 | 31 October 2015 | 23 January 2016 |
| 2 | 26 | 13 | 22 October 2016 | 7 January 2017 |
| 2 | 26 | 13 | 30 September 2017 | 16 December 2017 |
| 3 | 26 | 9 | 31 March 2018 | 26 May 2018 |
| 3 | 26 | 9 | 18 May 2019 | 13 July 2019 |
| 3 | 26 | 8 | 4 January 2020 | 22 February 2020 |

== Episodes ==
=== Series 1 (2015–16) ===
| No. overall | No. in series | Title | Directed by | Written by | Original release date | Prod. code |
|---|---|---|---|---|---|---|
Part 1
| 1 | 1 | "Ring of Fire" | David Scott | Rob Hoegee | 4 April 2015 (UK) (Note: Parts 1 and 2 of "Ring of Fire" premiered in omnibus. Repeats air as two singular episodes.); 12 April 2015 (AUS) | 2-2131-6 |
| 2 | 2 | "Ring of Fire" | David Scott | Rob Hoegee | 4 April 2015 (UK); 12 April 2015 (AUS) | 2-2131-7 |
Part 1: A busy day for International Rescue turns into a perilous one when a powerful submarine earthquake causes a research team to be trapped in their undersea lab. Thunderbirds 1, 2 and 4 are launched. As they attempt to rescue them, they discover a seismic de-stabiliser to be the source of the quake, and with Lady Penelope's help, learn the person responsible for this is the phantom figure known only as the Hood, who soon puts the world in danger, triggering more quakes along the notable feature of the Pacific Ocean, "The Ring of Fire." Part 2: With more quakes occurring, John and Brains must track down the control source for the seismic de-stabilisers, in a race against time, after the Hood orders International Rescue and the World Council to give up the Thunderbirds. Meanwhile, Scott and Virgil race to Taiwan when one of the undersea quakes destabilises a solar collector dish in Taipei, causing the dish to be positioned in such a way that when the sun rises, it will reflect on the city and burn it to the ground. This episode features elements adapted from the Thunderbirds episode "Lord Parker's 'Oliday".
| 3 | 3 | "Space Race" | Theo Baynton | Ian Carney | 11 April 2015 (UK); 19 April 2015 (AUS) | 2-2131-8 |
Alan is on "space junk duty" but things take a turn for the dangerous when one of the pieces of debris he attempts to clear away, turns out to be a heat-seeking SAT-MINE that activates and locks onto Thunderbird 3's heat signature. While Alan is forced to keep the mine locked onto his craft to safeguard other ships in orbit, Lady Penelope and Parker attempt to sneak into a top-secret storage facility and find the final digit to the mine's deactivation code, having only thirty minutes until the mine's nuclear charge detonates. Guest star: Reggie Yates as Ellis the Security Guard.
| 4 | 4 | "Crosscut" | David Scott | Mark Huckerby and Nick Ostler | 18 April 2015 (UK); 26 April 2015 (AUS) | 2-2131-3 |
When Thunderbird 5 picks up an unusual radiation spike from a remote corner of Africa, John discovers a former uranium mine has reopened, leading to Scott rushing there in Thunderbird 1 to investigate, with Virgil following. When Scott arrives and enters the mine, he discovers a source of unstable uranium, and is attacked by a mysterious woman, who claims that the mine belongs to her family. During their confrontation the mine soon begins to crumble, and she and Scott must work together to escape and reseal the mine, before a storm spreads the leaking radiation to the nearest city with serious consequences.
| 5 | 5 | "Fireflash" | David Scott | Andrew Robinson | 25 April 2015 (UK); 3 May 2015 (AUS) | 2-2131-4 |
Kayo is riding aboard Fireflash, a supersonic airliner that was recently improved by Brains, unaware that the Hood is planning to hijack it in mid-flight. While International Rescue notices the plane has suddenly vanished from their monitors and attempt to locate it, Kayo manages to avoid a powerful gas attack that has knocked out both the passengers and the crew, and is forced to not only confront the Hood, but also safely land the airliner when the craft is accidentally damaged and the landing gear fails to deploy. This episode is an adaptation of the Thunderbirds pilot episode "Trapped in the Sky".
| 6 | 6 | "Unplugged" | Theo Baynton | Scott Sonneborn | 2 May 2015 (UK); 10 May 2015 (AUS) | 2-2131-10 |
An anti-technology group calling themselves The Luddites power up an electromagnetic pulse device underneath London, crippling everything that uses electricity, including Thunderbird 2, which is forced to make an emergency landing. Both Virgil and Grandma Tracy, along with Lady Penelope and Parker, must stop the Luddites' plan to cause a worldwide blackout, while at the same time rescuing a construction worker from a damaged crane.
| 7 | 7 | "Runaway" | David Scott | Stan Berkowitz | 9 May 2015 (UK); 17 May 2015 (AUS) | 2-2131-1 |
A high-speed test train on a Japanese Maglev line suddenly goes out of control, and is in danger of running into the back of a passenger train. Only Brains can stop it, so he sets out with Scott on Thunderbird 1 to board the train. But in doing so, he discover the train is under the control of an Artificial Intelligence program, which John determines is playing a game. Scott and Brains must find a way of stopping it before it crashes into a station terminal. This episode features elements adapted from the Thunderbirds episode "Brink of Disaster"
| 8 | 8 | "EOS" | Theo Baynton | Ken Pontac | 16 May 2015 (UK); 24 May 2015 (AUS) | 2-2131-5 |
The childlike A.I. encountered in Japan suddenly takes control of Thunderbird 5, trapping John outside of it. The program, created by John as a game, believes it is defending itself from being shut down and is sending false monitor images to Tracy Island to deceive the others. Running out of air, John finds a way to reach Lady Penelope, who warns his brothers. Alan and Thunderbird 3 are soon sent to rescue John, with instructions to destroy Thunderbird 5 if the A.I. cannot be stopped.
| 9 | 9 | "Slingshot" | David Scott | Rob Hoegee | 23 May 2015 (UK); 31 May 2015 (AUS) | 2-2131-2 |
A large solar flare causes a malfunction at a mining operation on an asteroid, sending it careening towards the sun and endangering its only crewman, Ned Tedford and his Geranium plant, Gladys. Alan and Kayo deploy Thunderbird 3, but another solar flare knocks out their sensors and communications. Although they land in the mine, using the asteroid (now too close to the Sun) as a shield, they soon have to find a way to alter the asteroid's trajectory so that it slingshots around the Sun instead of crashing into it - which is further complicated by the discovery that Thunderbird 3's low fuel supply from the second flare, could make it impossible to return to Earth. This episode is a loose adaptation of the Thunderbirds episode "Sun Probe".
| 10 | 10 | "Tunnels of Time" | Theo Baynton | Dan Berlinka | 24 May 2015 (UK); 7 June 2015 (AUS) | 2-2131-12 |
A few months after International Rescue uncover an ancient temple in South America, Lady Penelope, as a representative of World Heritage, visits it along with Parker, Gordon, and Professor Harold, an archaeologist of a dubious reputation whom Penelope suspects of stealing artefacts. On entering the temple, everyone become trapped inside except for Harold, who manages to escape but refuses to call for help, not wishing the temple to be destroyed. Suspecting something is wrong, Scott and Virgil head to the scene to provide assistance, as Gordon, Penelope and Parker attempt to escape from the temple's many traps. Guest star: Matt Zimmerman as Professor Harold. Zimmerman also voiced the original Alan Tracy in Thunderbirds.
| 11 | 11 | "Skyhook" | David Scott | Paul Giacoppo | 6 June 2015 (UK); 14 June 2015 (AUS) | 2-2131-11 |
CIRRUS (Climate Research of the Upper Stratosphere), a weather station built cheaply with a lack of safety features, has a sudden failure in its stabilising fans, causing its balloons to lift the station higher into the atmosphere. Attempts at rescuing the crew by Thunderbirds 1 and 2 are thwarted by both the station's lack of protective equipment and it rising above the limits of the Thunderbirds' working altitude. Thunderbird 3 also fails when it is damaged by the station's fans breaking away, leaving John in Thunderbird 5, using the space elevator as a fishing hook, as the weather station's last hope. Guest star: Rhys Darby as Langstrom Fischler.
| 12 | 12 | "Under Pressure" | David Scott | Danny Stack | 13 June 2015 (UK); 21 June 2015 (AUS) | 2-2131-9 |
A giant heavy metal extraction plant, moving along the Pacific seabed and collecting toxic waste, has a sudden compartment fire, leaving it out of control and heading for an undersea chasm. Thunderbird 2 is dispatched with Thunderbird 4 to effect the rescue of the only crewman, Ned Tedford and his plant Gladys once again, and safeguard the toxic waste it is carrying. Meanwhile, Lady Penelope investigates the company that owns the extraction plant, when both John and Gordon suspect the owner was more concerned for the cargo than the crew, and soon has trouble from the Hood. This episode features elements adapted from the Thunderbirds episode "Path of Destruction".
| 13 | 13 | "Heavy Metal" | Theo Baynton | Benjamin Townsend | 20 June 2015 (UK); 28 June 2015 (AUS) | 2-2131-14 |
Brains and Alan visit the Quantum Research Center, adjacent to New Geneva in Switzerland, to visit Brains' old friend Professor Moffat and the Supreme Hadron Collider. Disaster soon strikes when the collider suddenly creates a gravity well of extreme power which soon pulls a satellite down towards New Geneva. International Rescue quickly mobilises when both an aircraft and the World Wide Space Station are also drawn into the gravity well, threatening the city. The only craft that can withstand the gravitational pressure is Thunderbird 4, which Gordon must pilot out of its normal undersea environment.
Part 2
| 14 | 14 | "Falling Skies" | Theo Baynton | Rob Hoegee | 31 October 2015 (UK); 1 November 2015 (AUS) | 2-2131-15 |
Designed by Brains, the Estrella Grand is a self-constructing luxury hotel in Earth orbit. During a visit by Lady Penelope and Parker, the hotel suffers a mysterious hull breach that will not repair itself, sending the hotel plummeting to Earth. Thunderbirds 2 and 3 are quickly launched to rescue the guests, while Kayo boards the hotel in search of a saboteur. This episode features elements adapted from the Thunderbirds episode "Ricochet".
| 15 | 15 | "Relic" | David Scott | Patrick Rieger | 7 November 2015 (UK); 8 November 2015 (AUS) | 2-2131-17 |
When a meteor shower is projected to hit the decommissioned Shadow Alpha One Moon base, concern arises with the discovery the base is still inhabited by a lone crew member - Captain Lee Taylor, an old friend of Jeff Tracy. Scott and Alan take Thunderbird 3 on a rescue mission after attempts to warn him fail, but when Scott boards the base, he's surprised to find Taylor attempting to maintain its defence system against meteors. After initial attempts to defend the base against continuing waves of meteors start to fail, both Scott and Taylor are forced to abandon the base to meet Thunderbird 3 at a rendezvous on the Moon's surface that is itself threatened by the meteor shower. Guest star: Rich Hall as Captain Lee Taylor. The name of the base alludes to locations from two previous Gerry Anderson productions – SHADO Moonbase from UFO and Moonbase Alpha from Space:1999.
| 16 | 16 | "Breakdown" | David Scott | Benjamin Townsend | 14 November 2015 (UK); 15 November 2015 (AUS) | 2-2131-13 |
While everyone is organising a surprise birthday party for Virgil, John directs his brother in Thunderbird 2 to a glacial ice shelf to investigate a 'breakdown' emergency call. Virgil quickly discovers that the lone figure he finds on arrival is part of a larger expedition trapped in a cavern beneath the ice. The expedition's leader, a scientist seeking a rare bacterium he desperately needs to cure his daughter of a serious disease, refuses to leave as the glacier begins to crumble, leaving Virgil no choice but to assist before time runs out. Guest star: Ramon Tikaram as Doctor Peck.
| 17 | 17 | "Heist Society" | Theo Baynton | Peter Briggs | 21 November 2015 (UK); 22 November 2015 (AUS) | 2-2131-16 |
On an underwater hyper loop train, Lady Penelope and Parker are escorting Professor Moffat to a rendezvouses with the Global Defence Force in Iceland in order to safely deliver a particle born from the Supreme Hadron Collider disaster - Centurium 21. However, the Hood is keen to get his hands on the particle and plots an elaborate robbery in order to steal it for himself. Thunderbirds 1, 2, and 4 are soon dispatched to not only rescue the trapped train and its passengers, but also attempt to foil the Hood's plan. This episode features elements adapted from the Thunderbirds episode "The Perils of Penelope".
| 18 | 18 | "Recharge" | David Scott | Amy Wolfram | 28 November 2015 (UK); 29 November 2015 (AUS) | 2-2131-19 |
High in the Arctic, a machine designed to harness the energy of the Aurora Borealis has gone haywire, and could permanently disrupt the magnetic field protecting the Earth if not repaired. Despite Virgil's insistence that they both need a break, Scott answers the call with Virgil and MAX in tow. Complicating matters are both the machine's interference with Thunderbird 1 and 2's flight capabilities (forcing Scott and Virgil to configure pods with skis to cross the treacherous ice), and Scott's alarming displays of impatience which are leading him to recklessly cast safety aside to complete the mission.
| 19 | 19 | "Extraction" | Karl Essex | Matt Wayne | 5 December 2015 (UK); 6 December 2015 (AUS) | 2-2131-20 |
Seismologist Robert Williams and his son Aidan alert the authorities to the presence of a rogue hydromethane mining vehicle, only for the machinery to trigger an earthquake that swallows both them and the equipment. Gordon must attempt a daring underground rescue of the boy and his injured father while Virgil must find a way to shut down the out-of-control rig. Guest star: Paterson Joseph as Robert Williams. This episode features elements adapted from the Thunderbirds episodes "Cry Wolf" and "Terror in New York City".
| 20 | 20 | "The Hexpert" | Andrew McCully | Kevin Rubio and Charlotte Fullerton | 12 December 2015 (UK); 13 December 2015 (AUS) | 2-2131-23 |
A scientist accidentally locks herself inside a vault housing a destabilizing anti-matter reactor. There is only one person who has successfully broken into a vault like this before - Parker. Colonel Casey of the GDF recruits Parker for the job, but moments after getting through the outer vault door, both he and Lady Penelope become trapped as well. Virgil and Scott must transport the vault to an isolated area on Thunderbird 2, while Parker and Penelope must try and free themselves and the scientist before the anti-matter explodes. This episode features elements adapted from the Thunderbirds episode "Vault of Death".
| 21 | 21 | "Comet Chasers" | David Scott | Randolph Heard | 19 December 2015 (UK); 20 December 2015 (AUS) | 2-2131-22 |
Halley's Comet is passing close to Earth, and businessman Francois Lemaire goes on an ego trip with his unimpressed wife Melanie aboard his space yacht Solar Wind, so as to send live pictures back to Earth. Disaster strikes when Francois flies into the comet's tail, damaging his ship and causing it to lose contact with Earth. Thunderbird 3 is dispatched for search and rescue with Alan and Scott on board, Alan being particularly keen to see Halley's comet as it will be another 75 years before the comet passes Earth again. Guest star: Jack Whitehall as Francois Lemaire.
| 22 | 22 | "Designated Driver" | David Scott | David Baddiel | 26 December 2015 (UK); 27 December 2015 (AUS) | 2-2131-21 |
Parker gives Alan driving lessons at the Creighton-Ward estate in FAB 0, the car in which Parker had taught the other brothers, while Lady Penelope has tea with her Great Aunt Sylvia. Progress is slow until a pair of bumbling intruders attempt to kidnap the ladies in FAB 1. A chaotic chase involving the two cars ensues round the estate with Alan at the wheel, as Parker has broken his arm earlier in Alan's lesson. When the vehicles take to the air, Alan has the advantage until FAB 0 runs out of petrol, and a teapot is needed to save the situation. Guest star: Sylvia Anderson as Great Aunt Sylvia. Anderson also voiced the original Lady Penelope in Thunderbirds. FAB 0 is modelled after the original FAB 1 from Thunderbirds.
| 23 | 23 | "Chain of Command" | David Scott | Joe Kuhr | 2 January 2016 (UK); 3 January 2016 (AUS) | 2-2131-24 |
During a joint operation between International Rescue and the Global Defence Force, a series of mishaps nearly end in disaster. In the wake of the botched mission, Colonel Martin Janus takes over the GDF, imposing a strict set of restrictions on International Rescue. As the Tracys become increasingly frustrated at being kept from rescuing innocents, Lady Penelope and Parker attempt to reason with the colonel, and begin to realize that he is not quite what he seems. This episode features elements adapted from the Thunderbirds episode "The Impostors".
| 24 | 24 | "Touch and Go" | David Scott | Jim Krieg | 9 January 2016 (UK); 10 January 2016 (AUS) | 2-2131-25 |
A facility known as CATCH, responsible for controlling all air traffic in the USA, is sabotaged. Scott and Virgil launch a rescue mission to thwart a mid-air plane collision while Kayo infiltrates CATCH using Thunderbird Shadow. Kayo soon discovers that the crisis is a diversion from a larger plan by the Hood, and endangers herself by disobeying Scott and John's instructions regarding International Rescue's mission to save people and not act as the police.
| 25 | 25 | "Undercover" | Tim Gaul | Benjamin Townsend | 16 January 2016 (UK); 17 January 2016 (AUS) | 2-2131-18 |
An undercover operation involving Lady Penelope and Parker to recover a stolen Repulser Magnetic Array for the Global Defence Force gets blown prematurely. Parker is taken prisoner by the thief aboard a stolen GDF flyer, with Kayo in pursuit in Thunderbird Shadow. The flyer crash lands on a factory roof and International Rescue must intervene to help save Parker and a factory worker. Kayo confronts the thief to find he knows her secret relationship with the Hood, and must weigh letting him escape against her secret coming out in the open.
| 26 | 26 | "Legacy" | David Scott | Rob Hoegee | 23 January 2016 (UK); 24 January 2016 (AUS) | 2-2131-26 |
A range of equally timed disasters involve everyone at International Rescue. Kayo deduces that the Hood is behind these acts in an attempt to capture the Thunderbird crafts and Tracy Island. As the Hood and his men take the island and Brains and Grandma Tracy retreat to a bunker, Kayo arranges with Lady Penelope the activation of W.A.S.P. (Wide Area Safety Protocol) from Creighton Ward Manor, before going to confront the Hood. As his plan unravels the Hood openly states his relationship to Kayo and proclaims that she is working for him, in an attempt to undermine the Tracy's trust in her. This episode features elements adapted from the film Thunderbirds (2004).

=== Series 2 (2016–17) ===
| No. overall | No. in series | Title | Directed by | Written by | Original release date | Prod. code |
|---|---|---|---|---|---|---|
Part 1
| 27 | 1 | "Earthbreaker" | Tim Gaul | Rob Hoegee | 22 October 2016 (UK); 13 November 2016 (AUS) | 2-2131-34 |
A geological survey team becomes trapped when a huge earth-breaking vehicle, controlled by a villain known only as the Mechanic, causes them to fall into a narrow crevice. International Rescue launches Thunderbirds 1, 2 and Shadow while the Global Defence Force attempt to tackle the Mechanic. When Thunderbird 2 is badly damaged and must return to Tracy Island, and the GDF is neutralised by the Mechanic, Kayo is left to stop him and his drones while Scott must rescue the survey team. Meanwhile Lady Penelope and Parker visit the Hood in solitary confinement in Parkmoor Scrubs prison, as they believe he is behind the mysterious Mechanic. Guest star: Jenna Coleman as Baines.
| 28 | 2 | "Ghost Ship" | Theo Baynton | Joseph Kuhr | 22 October 2016 (UK); 13 November 2016 (AUS) | 2-2131-27 |
A distress call is received from Captain Ridley O'Bannon, a GDF astronaut, on the abandoned interstellar ship Eden orbiting between the Earth and the Moon. John attempts a rescue from Thunderbird 5 wearing an exo-pod, but is trapped with O'Bannon by mysterious spider-like robots. Alan attempts a rescue in Thunderbird 3, and they discover two salvage workers are posing as pirates. Guest star: Vas Blackwood as Reece. The name "Ridley O'Bannon" alludes to Ridley Scott and Dan O'Bannon, respectively the director and screenwriter of the film Alien (1979).
| 29 | 3 | "Deep Search" | David Scott | Rich Fogel | 29 October 2016 (UK); 20 November 2016 (AUS) | 2-2131-28 |
On Jupiter's moon Europa, the stars of Gordon's favourite explorer program (Buddy and Ellie Pendergast) are searching for extra-terrestrial life. When they begin drilling into the ice, pressure from geysers cause the ice to crack and they plunge into an underground ocean ten miles below. Alan (in command) and Gordon blast off to the rescue in Thunderbird 3, with Thunderbird 4 stored aboard and modified with skis, powerful engines and a heat drill to penetrate the ice, which they lose due to strong underwater currents. They find the Pendergasts, who have taken shelter in their rover, but before they leave they detect a life form in the sea. Guest star: Adam Hills as Buddy Pendergast. This episode uses elements adapted from the TV Century 21 comic story "Solar Danger".
| 30 | 4 | "City Under the Sea" | Simon Godsiff | Jim Krieg and Jeremy Adams | 5 November 2016 (UK); 27 November 2016 (AUS) | 2-2131-33 |
At Bay City, a town that was flooded due to global warming, the Mechanic, in a crab-like submarine, searches through the ruins of the Creighton-Ward building for a safe containing the plans for Parkmoor Scrubs prison so he can break the Hood out. As he smashes his way through some of the debris he collides with a rental sub hired by the Sullivan family causing it to crash onto the seabed. While Gordon and Kayo work together to rescue the family, Lady Penelope and Parker, using FAB 1's submarine mode, must reach the safe before the Mechanic gets there first. Guest star: Sanjeev Bhaskar as Ethan Sullivan.
| 31 | 5 | "Colony" | David Scott | Patrick Rieger | 12 November 2016 (UK); 4 December 2016 (AUS) | 2-2131-33 |
A proton storm causes a systems malfunction aboard the Helius, a space vehicle transporting families to a colony base on Mars. The ship overshoots the red planet and heads straight for the asteroid belt. Kayo recruits Captain Lee Taylor to join Alan and Scott aboard Thunderbird 3 to fend off the asteroids. The Helius is damaged further and International Rescue must find a way to land the ship on Mars, even though it was only designed to orbit the planet. Guest star: Rich Hall as Captain Lee Taylor. This episode uses elements adapted from the film Thunderbirds Are Go (1966).
| 32 | 6 | "Up from the Depths" | Andrew McCully | Benjamin Townsend | 19 November 2016 (UK); 11 December 2016 (AUS) | 2-2131-29 |
| 32 | 7 | "Up from the Depths" | Andrew McCully | Benjamin Townsend | 26 November 2016 (UK); 18 December 2016 (AUS) | 2-2131-30 |
Part 1: Deep in the Mariana Trench a survey team encounter the TV-21, a prototype Thunderbird vehicle designed and flown by Jeff Tracy. When a systems failure causes the survey sub to be stranded on the seabed, International Rescue arrives to rescue the crew, but the Mechanic suddenly takes control of the surveyor and uses it to crush Thunderbird 4. Gordon escapes just as his ship is destroyed and must find another way to rescue the crew. Meanwhile, Lady Penelope and Parker investigate into how the Hood is communicating with the Mechanic. Part 2: The Mechanic's remotely operated ship flees the scene with the TV-21. Scott pursues in Thunderbird 1 but is unable to capture the enemy ship and suffers damage. The Mechanic then steals a GDF vault containing iridium, with Ned Tedford and Gladys inside, and sends his ship into space. With two Thunderbirds out of commission Thunderbird 3 is modified with weapons so that Alan, with help from MAX, can fight the ship while Scott tries to recover the vault and the TV-21. Meanwhile, Kayo, Penelope and Parker head for Scotland to search for the Mechanic.
| 34 | 8 | "Lost Kingdom" | Theo Baynton | Elly Brewer | 3 December 2016 (UK); 25 December 2016 (AUS) | 2-2131-39 |
After a seaquake near the coast of Greece reveals the lost city of Atlantis, Francois Lemaire ignores International Rescue's warning about aftershocks and with his wife, Melanie, venture below the depths to explore the area. When their submarine becomes stuck, Virgil and Gordon are called to assist. Brains and MAX go with them so that they could see the Solar Kythera, an ancient device used to view the stars. Guest star: Jack Whitehall as Francois Lemaire.
| 35 | 9 | "Impact" | Theo Baynton | Len Uhley | 10 December 2016 (UK); 1 January 2017 (AUS) | 2-2131-36 |
Using a remote controlled rocket booster Langstrom Fischler tries to bring a comet into Earth's orbit so he can mine it. When the rocket doesn't fire the comet ends up on a collision course with both the Earth and Globe One, a GDF space station with Captain Ridley O'Bannon aboard. While Alan and Virgil take Thunderbird 3 up to the comet and find a way to destroy it John must use Thunderbird 5 to help O'Bannon move Globe One out of the comet's path. Guest star: Rhys Darby as Langstrom Fischler.
| 36 | 10 | "High Strung" | Andrew McCully | Mark Huckerby and Nick Ostler | 17 December 2016 (UK); 8 January 2017 (AUS) | 2-2131-37 |
John detects a high altitude balloon heading straight for the Southern Alps in New Zealand and is unable to contact the pilot. At first everyone suspects that Francois Lemaire is at the controls but when Scott boards the craft he discovers that the pilot is a teenager named Brandon Berrenger, who works for Lemaire. When the balloon crashes on top of a mountain Scott and Brandon have to use Brains' new invention, Rapid All-terrain Descender, to get down. Guest star: Tom Rosenthal as Brandon Berrenger.
| 37 | 11 | "Weather or Not" | Chad Moffitt | Len Uhley | 24 December 2016 (UK); 15 January 2017 (AUS) | 2-2131-31 |
Langstrom Fischler has invented some weather drones, designed to fire supercharged ions to created storm clouds. During a demonstration the drones malfunction and concentrate the storm around the observation tower, which is in danger of collapsing due to getting zapped by the drones. Thunderbirds 2 and Shadow race to the danger zone to rescue Fischler and his guests, while Parker's flying skills are put to the test as he uses FAB 1's flight mod to lure the drones away from the tower. Guest star: Rhys Darby as Langstrom Fischler. This episode features elements adapted from the Thunderbirds episode "Edge of Impact".
| 38 | 12 | "Fight or Flight" | Karl Esses | Dan Berlinka | 31 December 2016 (UK); 22 January 2017 (AUS) | 2-2131-38 |
A cargo zeppelin called Baross suffers damage and is on a collision course with a city. To make matters worse two crew members are unable to abandon ship because one of the ship's loading claws has malfunctioned and has started to attack anything that moves in the cargo bay. Scott and Virgil must try and pull the ship up from its crash course while Kayo takes on the claw and rescues the crew.
| 39 | 13 | "Escape Proof" | Theo Baynton | Rich Fogel | 7 January 2017 (UK); 29 January 2017 (AUS) | 2-2131-35 |
A tunneling vehicle belonging to the Mechanic leaves a plumber trapped in its wake and it is up to Virgil and Gordon to get him out. Lady Penelope and Parker track down the Mechanic's vehicle and discover that he's heading straight for Parkmoor Scrubs prison, where the Hood is being held. Although the breakout is successful the Hood double crosses the Mechanic and leaves him to be arrested by the GDF while he slips away. The Mechanic also escapes and programs his vehicle to self-destruct. Guest star: Omid Djalili as Horse Williams. This episode uses elements adapted from the TV Century 21 comic story "Operation Earthquake".
Part 2
| 40 | 14 | "Volcano!" | Karl Essex | Benjamin Townsend | 30 September 2017 (UK); 1 October 2017 (AUS) | 2-2131-34 |
Professor Quentin Questa has inaccurately predicted the eruption of a volcano in Iceland for the last decade. This time however, he invokes a special science code of honour (Newton's Fourth Law) that brings Brains and MAX out to his location. Brains discovers that Questa is right: the volcano is going to blow and it's threatening to destroy a local hot spring resort. Guest star: Mark Gatiss as Professor Quentin Questa.
| 41 | 15 | "Power Play" | Ben Milsom | Rob Hoegee | 7 October 2017 (UK); 8 October 2017 (AUS) | 2-2131-42 |
The Mechanic takes over the Grand Sequoia Dam in North America and steals power for a project the Hood abandoned because he considered it to be too extreme. When the turbines are pushed to the limit the dam starts to break up. Scott crawls inside to rescue the trapped workers while Virgil, Alan and Gordon attempt to seal a growing crack.
| 42 | 16 | "Bolt from the Blue" | Theo Baynton | Elly Brewer | 14 October 2017 (UK); 15 October 2017 (AUS) | 2-2131-49 |
An orbiting solar energy station malfunctions and fires plasma bolts towards the North Pacific ocean. A cargo plane, carrying a rare animal, is struck by the bolts and International Rescue is called to rescue the crew and cargo. At the same time Lady Penelope and Parker are on board the station and must find a way to shut it down. Guest star: Ruby Wax as Hayley Edmonds. This episode uses elements adapted from the Thunderbirds episode "Operation Crash-Dive".
| 43 | 17 | "Attack of the Reptiles" | Theo Baynton | Patrick Rieger | 21 October 2017 (UK); 22 October 2017 (AUS) | 2-2131-48 |
Buddy and Ellie Pendergast venture into the Mulokamba valley in Africa to search of an elusive creature. When they fail to return, Scott and Gordon fly out in Thunderbird 1 to look for them. After Gordon parachutes down into the valley he finds Ellie and both get chased by giant lizards. They also discover giant fruits and they find Buddy at an abandoned research complex, which had been developing a growth serum. They must now find a way to get out of the valley without getting eaten by the reptiles. Guest star: Adam Hills as Buddy Pendergast. This episode uses elements adapted from the Thunderbirds episode "Attack of the Alligators!".
| 44 | 18 | "Grandma Tourismo" | Andrew McCully | Amy Wolfram | 28 October 2017 (UK); 5 November 2017 (AUS) | 2-2131-46 |
Virgil and Grandma are out resupplying the island when they receive a distress call from the Sahara Desert. A rockfall at a granite quarry has trapped three workers in the main office and it's in danger of collapsing. When Virgil goes to help the workers he gets caught in a massive sandstorm and it is up to Grandma to save the day, but can she fly Thunderbird 2? Guest star: Kathryn Drysdale as Kate.
| 45 | 19 | "Clean Sweep" | Theo Baynton | David Baddiel | 4 November 2017 (UK); 12 November 2017 (AUS) | 2-2131-51 |
An Oxy-Baker atmospheric scrubber malfunctions and a helijet with a crew of two is trapped inside. Scott, Virgil and John go to rescue but the only way to save the crew is to shut down the machine using a digi-key. The scrubber's operator, a former companion of Parker's misspent youth known as Light-Fingered Fred, refuses to break the rules. Guest stars: Sinéad Keenan as Dolly and Alan Ford as Light-Fingered Fred.
| 46 | 20 | "The Man from TB5" | Theo Baynton | Paul Giacoppo | 11 November 2017 (UK); 19 November 2017 (AUS) | 2-2131-45 |
Lady Penelope brings John as her guest to a charity event at the Chateau Traverse. John is out of his element in the large social setting but his obscurity pays off when the Hood crashes the party when he threatens to destroy the chateau unless the guests allow him to rob them. Meanwhile, Alan and Gordon take over the watch aboard Thunderbird 5 despite the fact that EOS doesn't trust them. The episode title is a homage to the Thunderbirds episode "The Man from MI.5".
| 47 | 21 | "Inferno" | Tim Gaul | Benjamin Townsend | Unaired (UK) (Note: This episode was not transmitted in the UK due to the premise bearing similarities to the Grenfell Tower fire. It remains available from streaming platforms and as a bonus episode on the Series 3 Volume 2 DVD release.); 26 November 2017 (AUS) | 2-2131-41 |
In London, the Crystal Spire, the tallest building in the world, catches fire due to an electrical overload and the local firefighters are rendered helpless. Virgil and Alan are called in Thunderbird 2 to extinguish the flames and rescue everyone trapped inside. Guest star: Sharon D. Clarke as Fire Chief Cass McCready. This episode features elements adapted from the Thunderbirds episode "City of Fire".
| 48 | 22 | "Home on the Range" | Andrew McCully | Rob Hoegee and Patrick Rieger | 18 November 2017 (UK); 3 December 2017 (AUS) | 2-2131-47 |
All of International Rescue take a retreat for training at their family ranch off the main island. During training, the equipment malfunctions, MAX goes crazy and both the Thunderbird ships and FAB 1 stop working. John, Brains and EOS work together to trace the fault and discover that they have an intruder, The Mechanic!
| 49 | 23 | "Long Haul" | Karl Essex | Dan Berlinka | 25 November 2017 (UK); 10 December 2017 (AUS) | 2-2131-50 |
An emergency space docking goes wrong and the reactor of the orbiting Spacehub transit terminal goes into meltdown. A young traffic controller named Conrad is trapped inside and Alan is unable to reach him. With Thunderbird 3 being used to keep Conrad alive International Rescue's only hope is to modify Thunderbird 2 for space flight in order to transport a new cooling system to the hub. Guest star: Asa Butterfield as Conrad.
| 50 | 24 | "Rigged for Disaster" | Chad Moffitt | Patrick Rieger | 2 December 2017 (UK); 17 December 2017 (AUS) | 2-2131-43 |
Lady Penelope, Parker and Kayo arrive at a massive semi-submersible ocean oil rig to decommission the polluting relic. However, supervisor Malloy has other plans. After starting a fire and locking the rest of the crew below decks he escapes. International Rescue now have their hands full trying to stop the rig from fulling apart and causing an oil leak. Guest star: Emilia Clarke as Doyle. This episode features elements adapted from the Thunderbirds episode "Atlantic Inferno".
| 51 | 25 | "Hyperspeed" | Simon Godsiff | David Slack | 9 December 2017 (UK); 24 December 2017 (AUS) | 2-2131-40 |
On the maiden journey of his brand new hyper-car, Tycho Reeves and his passengers are horrified when the vehicle begins to speed up. As Brains tries to work out where the problem is Scott uses another hyper-car to reach the speeding vehicle. Guest star: David Tennant as Tycho Reeves.
| 52 | 26 | "Brains vs. Brawn" | Chad Moffitt | Benjamin Townsend | 16 December 2017 (UK); 31 December 2017 (AUS) | 2-2131-52 |
The Mechanic finally completes Project Sentinel and puts its destructive capabilities to the test by making The Hood his first target. As the International Rescue team scrambles to save an old foe Brains and MAX, using Thunderbird 5's space elevator, embarks on a dangerous mission to shut down the satellite and neutralise the Mechanic once and for all.

=== Series 3 (2018–20) ===
| No. overall | No. in series | Title | Directed by | Written by | Original release date | Prod. code |
|---|---|---|---|---|---|---|
Part 1
| 53 | 1 | "Chaos" | Karl Essex | Rob Hoegee | 31 March 2018 (UK); 2 June 2018 (AUS / NZ) | 2-2131-53 |
| 54 | 2 | "Chaos" | Karl Essex | Rob Hoegee | 7 April 2018 (UK); 3 June 2018 (AUS / NZ) | 2-2131-54 |
Part 1: Since the Hood's escape from GDF custody, he has employed the help of Havoc and Fuse, criminal siblings who together make up the Chaos Crew. Providing them with tools and vehicles, he tasks them with causing terrorist attacks across the world, leaving International Rescue overwhelmed. The GDF reveal plans to launch a fleet of machines called Rescue Operation Bots (R.O.Bots) to handle low priority rescues, despite some doubts from IR. Virgil and Gordon successfully test out one of the bots in an Arctic rescue, allowing the GDF to deploy the rest of the fleet. Meanwhile, Kayo is assigned to track down Havoc with GDF Captain Rigby. Despite an initial dislike towards one another, they overcome their differences and work together to arrest Havoc. Part 2: Two days have passed since Havoc's arrest and the fleet of R.O.BOTS are deployed, leaving International Rescue with very little to do. However, when a flying platform for a commercial space elevator breaks down the R.O.BOTS are unable to assist and Thunderbirds 1, 2 and 3 blast off to the rescue. To make matters worse, Havoc escapes from the GDF, steals a remote control device and uses it to cause the R.O.BOTS to malfunction.
| 55 | 3 | "Path of Destruction" | Ben Milsom | Patrick Rieger | 14 April 2018 (UK); 4 June 2018 (AUS / NZ) | 2-2131-55 |
A truck carrying Nutrezine, a highly volatile fuel, is trapped by a rock slide and International Rescue are called to assist. They soon discover that the rock slide was not an accident and that Fuse is trying to hijack the truck. Virgil and Gordon must escort the truck through the treacherous mountain pass to its destination and stop Fuse from causing more chaos. Guest stars: Ruth Jones as Road Hog Renee and Karla Crome as Sophie.
| 56 | 4 | "Night and Day" | Theo Baynton | Jonathan Callan | 21 April 2018 (UK); 5 June 2018 (AUS / NZ) | 2-2131-56 |
On the dark side of the planet Mercury the Houseman and Gray mining crawler breaks down after a rocket capsule explodes. The crew are unable to evacuate and if the crawler fails to get moving again it will be destroyed by the sun's blazing heat. Alan and Brains arrive in Thunderbird 3 to help with the repairs but one problem leads to another and it's a race against time before the sun rises. Guest star: Richard Ridings as Bob Gray.
| 57 | 5 | "Growing Pains" | Theo Baynton | Patrick Rieger | 28 April 2018 (UK); 6 June 2018 (AUS / NZ) | 2-2131-57 |
Ned Tedford along with Gladys is now the caretaker of the Global Seed Vault, a GDF complex at the North Pole that stores millions of seeds should the world ever have a food shortage. Havoc infiltrates the vault and intends to steal the Orchard Industries growth serum from Gordon's Mulokamba mission. John, Kayo and Rigby respond along with a portable drive for EOS, but things take a turn when a computer virus infects EOS and the serum touches Gladys, turning her into Giant Gladys.
| 58 | 6 | "Life Signs" | Ben Milsom | Jonathan Callan | 5 May 2018 (UK); 7 June 2018 (AUS / NZ) | 2-2131-58 |
Deep in a cavern on the planet Mars Captain Taylor and runaway scientist, Professor Karim, are trapped after a cave in. Karim's space suit is damaged and moving the rocks on top of him would make the tear worse. Alan and Virgil fly to the red planet and assist with the aid of a space POD and a modified exo-suit. However, the POD is crushed by another cave in and the only way to save Karim is for Virgil to seal himself in the tunnel and fill it full of air using oxygen tanks. This leaves Alan very little time for him to dig them out with Thunderbird 3's drill. Guest stars: Rich Hall as Captain Lee Taylor and Nabil Elouahabi as Professor Karim.
| 59 | 7 | "Rally Raid" | Theo Baynton | Benjamin Townsend | 12 May 2018 (UK); 8 June 2018 (AUS / NZ) | 2-2131-59 |
Lady Penelope and Parker compete in a desert motor race with FAB 1 and a racer named Jensen Hunt. All seems well until the Chaos Crew steal a turbo computer from the leading car known as the BR2. The team must rescue the BR2 driver, steal back the BR2 engine and outrace the Chaos Crew's Spoiler. Guest star: Ben Bailey Smith as Jensen Hunt. This episode features elements adapted from the Thunderbirds episode "Move – and You're Dead". It is also dedicated to the memory of Sylvia Anderson, co-creator of the original series and voice actress of the original Lady Penelope.
| 60 | 8 | "Crash Course" | Theo Baynton | Amy Wolfram | 19 May 2018 (UK); 9 June 2018 (AUS / NZ) | 2-2131-60 |
When two space freighters crash in low Earth orbit, Alan and John must evacuate the hotheaded pilots before the ships burn in Earth's spearhead or collide with a dangerous debris field. Guest star: Adam Howden as Barrett Bell.
| 61 | 9 | "Flame Out" | Karl Essex | Benjamin Townsend | 26 May 2018 (UK); 10 June 2018 (AUS / NZ) | 2-2131-61 |
When gas from a dangerous hydro-methane reserve begins to leak, fire-fighter expert and Virgil's hero Kip Harris asks International Rescue to assist. While Virgil plugs the leak, Gordon follows an illegal pipeline out to sea and soon discovers that the Chaos Crew are siphoning off the hydro-methane. Guest star: Ramon Tikaram as Kip Harris. This episode features elements adapted from the Thunderbirds episode "The Mighty Atom".
Part 2
| 62 | 10 | "Deep Water" | Karl Essex | Len Uhley | 18 May 2019 (UK); 10 August 2019 (AUS / NZ) | 2-2131-62 |
When two scientists notice a huge section of coral reef bleaching from acidic waters their submarine breaks down and they take refuge in an air pocket in the reef. Gordon launches in Thunderbird 4 to rescue them. With help from Lady Penelope's new solar powered rig they discover the cause, a sunken cargo ship containing dangerous acidic materials. Guest star: Jennifer Saunders as Helen Shelby.
| 63 | 11 | "Endgame" | Shinji Dawson | Patrick Rieger | 25 May 2019 (UK); 11 August 2019 (AUS / NZ) | 2-2131-63 |
The Chaos Crew infiltrate Cavern Quest, a futuristic holographic game park, where they plan to steal a powerful piece of holographic technology - the Holotrix. When Fuse accidentally sets off a sonic grenade the park starts to crumble. Kayo, with the help of the game creator who only talks like a wizard, must play through the game in order to stop the Chaos Crew and escape before the park collapses. Guest star: Sylvester McCoy as Aezethril the Wizard.
| 64 | 12 | "SOS" | Karl Essex | Rob Hoegee | 1 June 2019 (UK); 17 August 2019 (AUS / NZ) | 2-2131-64 |
| 65 | 13 | "SOS" | Karl Essex | Rob Hoegee | 8 June 2019 (UK); 18 August 2019 (AUS / NZ) | 2-2131-65 |
Part 1: International Rescue receives a distress call from the Calypso, a deep space vessel returning from a long mission. Scott and Brains get aboard the plummeting ship and locate the two astronauts in suspended animation along with an old robot named Braman, who sent the original distress call. They wake up the astronauts and take them and the ship's computer data back to Thunderbird 3. Braman stays aboard to pilot the Calypso away from a crash course with a major city in Africa and into the sea. Meanwhile, Gordon borrows Thunderbird 1 to help Parker find Lady Penelope's dog, Sherbert. Part 2: Braman survives the Calypso's crash and is still transmitting the distress call from under the sea. The Hood picks it up and travels with the Chaos Crew to investigate. When Gordon arrives an underwater battle results in the Chaos Crew stealing Braman, Thunderbird 4 being crushed and Gordon badly injured. Luckily his brothers and Lady Penelope rescue him and take him to hospital. Kayo pursues the Chaos Crew, who ditch Braman in order to lose her. She takes the robot to Tracy Island, where Brains uses it to decipher the Calypso's data and they discover that Jeff Tracy originally sent Braman's distress call from deep space. Guest star: Nina Sosanya as Asher.
| 66 | 14 | "Signals" | Theo Baynton | Rob Hoegee | 15 June 2019 (UK); 24 August 2019 (AUS / NZ) | 2-2131-66 |
| 67 | 15 | "Signals" | Theo Baynton | Rob Hoegee | 22 June 2019 (UK); 25 August 2019 (AUS / NZ) | 2-2131-67 |
Part 1: Through the use of 8 year old archive footage of the Zero-X incident, Brains informs the members of International Rescue of his shocking theory. But in order to gather more information, the heroes split into groups to search for an escape pod that has been missing since Jeff Tracy's crash. Scott, Virgil and Lady Penelope take Thunderbird 2 and the re-built Thunderbird 4 to search the area where the pod might have landed in the ocean. Meanwhile, Alan and Kayo take Thunderbird 3 to a space junkyard between the Earth and the Moon, where they meet the space pirates from the Eden ship, but Havoc is spying on them. Part 2: Scott locates the Zero-X’s escape pod but it's stuck in sea sludge. When he tries to extract it, the pod starts to sink into the seabed, taking Thunderbird 4 with it. Despite Brains warning about using Thunderbird 2 as a submarine, Virgil and Lady Penelope take the ship down so that the magnetic grabs can reach Scott. Meanwhile, Havoc hijacks Thunderbird 3 with Alan and Kayo and the space pirates must use the Chaos Cruiser to get it back. After returning to Tracy Island, the family find out that the explosion of the Zero-X was actually a successful launch into deep space which means Brains was right, Jeff Tracy is alive. They now plan to build a new Zero-X to bring Jeff Tracy home. Guest star: Vas Blackwood as Reece.
| 68 | 16 | "Chain Reaction" | Karl Essex | Anne Mortensen-Agnew | 29 June 2019 (UK); 31 August 2019 (AUS / NZ) | 2-2131-68 |
A young GDF officer gets trapped inside a lift shaft in Shackleton, a haunted nuclear power station that was abandoned after a meltdown. Scott takes Thunderbird 1 in to assist, along with help from GDF Lieutenant and nuclear expert Marion Van-Arkel. They soon discover that Fuse is trying to steal uranium but when he puts himself in mortal danger, Scott has no choice but to rescue him. Fuse escapes just in time but the power plant goes into lock down, trapping Scott and the GDF officers inside along with the Shackleton Beast! Guest star: Navin Chowdhry as Cameron.
| 69 | 17 | "Getaway" | Chad Moffitt | Richard Dinnick | 6 July 2019 (UK); 1 September 2019 (AUS / NZ) | 2-2131-69 |
Two of Parker's old acquaintances, Light-Fingered Fred and Gomez, hijack FAB 1 and use it as a getaway car after robbing a building that sorts diamonds. The building is damaged by old explosives known as sonic wave devices and a woman is trapped in the sub-basement. While Virgil teams up with Chief McCready to rescue her, Lady Penelope and Parker commandeer a taxi and chase after FAB 1. Guest stars: Alan Ford as Light-Fingered Fred, Larry Lamb as Gomez and Sharon D. Clarke as Fire Chief Cass McCready. This episode features elements adapted from the Thunderbirds episode "Brink of Disaster".
| 70 | 18 | "Avalanche" | Karl Essex | Benjamin Townsend | 13 July 2019 (UK); 7 September 2019 (AUS / NZ) | 2-2131-70 |
Popular vlogger Brandon Berrenger and his friend Goose get trapped during an avalanche at Pincushion Mountain. Scott, Virgil & Alan must find a way to carefully dig them out without triggering off another avalanche. Alan is hoping that he'll get to be in Brandon's vlog, but is he cool enough? Guest star: Tom Rosenthal as Brandon Berrenger.
Part 3
| 71 | 19 | "Upside Down" | Ben Milsom and Tim Gaul | Lisa Kettle | 4 January 2020 (UK); 7 March 2020 (AUS / NZ) | 2-2131-71 |
Lady Penelope and Parker are testing their new luxury yacht, FAB 2, when they receive a distress call from a broken down tanker. A tsunami has formed and is heading right for the tanker's location. When FAB 2 arrives Penelope tries to persuade the crew to abandon ship, but the tsunami strikes and the tanker is flipped upside down trapping Penelope and the crew inside. Guest star: Sacha Dhawan as Stew
| 72 | 20 | "Icarus" | Karl Essex | Benjamin Townsend | 11 January 2020 (UK); 14 March 2020 (AUS / NZ) | 2-2131-72 |
Lady Penelope invites the Tracy brothers and Kayo with their Thunderbird vehicles to a prestigious global airshow. One part of the show involves test pilot, Professor Kwark, hoping to break the world airspeed record using the ultra fast Icarus superjet. Although she succeeds, the Icarus' speed increases and International Rescue must find a way to get Kwark out before the jet runs out of fuel and crashes. Guest stars: Gemma Chan as Professor Kwark and Cel Spellman as Announcer.
| 73 | 21 | "Break Out" | Shinji Dawson | Benjamin Townsend | 18 January 2020 (UK); 21 March 2020 (AUS / NZ) | 2-2131-73 |
Brains is having trouble building the T-Drive engine for the new Zero-X. The only person who can help is the man who built the original engine - The Mechanic! But to avoid the Hood's mind control he's locked up inside a space prison called the HEX. After convincing Colonel Casey, Alan and Kayo take Thunderbird 3 up to the HEX and rendezvous with Captain Rigby who would oversee the transfer. However, through his GDF spy, the Hood discovers this and sends the Chaos Crew to pick up his old friend. Havoc and Fuse destroy the HEX but the Mechanic, who refuses to go with them, escapes and agrees to build another T-Drive for International Rescue, if Brains keeps his promise to free him from the Hood.
| 74 | 22 | "Buried Treasure" | Ben Milsom | Kevin Burke and Chris "Doc" Wyatt | 25 January 2020 (UK); 28 March 2020 (AUS / NZ) | 2-2131-74 |
An urban explorer named Scraps gets trapped in an underground trash mine. Scott, Virgil and Gordon must pull off a rescue without becoming buried treasure themselves. Meanwhile, back on Tracy Island, Brains attempts a dangerous operation to free the Mechanic from the Hood's control. Guest star: Sheridan Smith as Scraps.
| 75 | 23 | "Venom" | Ben Milsom | Dan Berlinka | 1 February 2020 (UK); 4 April 2020 (AUS / NZ) | 2-2131-75 |
An arachnologist is bitten by a rare spider in a dense rainforest, and a carrier drone containing anti-venom goes off course. Scott, Virgil and Kayo fly to the scene in Thunderbird 2 to find the drone before it's too late. Meanwhile, Lady Penelope and Parker visit Professor Moffat to collect some Centurium 21, which is needed as fuel for the T-Drive engine. But someone has stolen the entire supply. Guest star: Peter Davison as Higgins.
| 76 | 24 | "Firebreak" | Tim Gaul and Ben Milsom | Patrick Rieger | 8 February 2020 (UK); 11 April 2020 (AUS / NZ) | 2-2131-76 |
In the Anasta Forest, two rescue scouts, Bee and Henry, get locked inside an antiquated Crablogger vehicle in the middle of the forest fire. All five Tracy brothers respond, and assist both on land and in the sky to rescue the scouts and put out the fires. This episode uses elements adapted from the Thunderbirds episode "Path of Destruction".
| 77 | 25 | "The Long Reach" | Karl Essex | Rob Hoegee | 15 February 2020 (UK); 18 April 2020 (AUS / NZ) | 2-2131-77 |
| 78 | 26 | "The Long Reach" | Karl Essex | Rob Hoegee | 22 February 2020 (UK); 25 April 2020 (AUS / NZ) | 2-2131-78 |
Part 1: All five Thunderbirds are combined into the Zero-XL as International Rescue begin their deep-space search for Jeff Tracy, only for the Chaos Crew to attempt to disrupt the craft's launch. While Havoc and Fuse hide soon afterwards, waiting to strike, the Tracy boys finally reach their father's current position and achieve their long sought-after reunion with him. Part 2: Havoc and Fuse attempt to cause chaos on Tracy Island, leading to Kayo, Grandma Tracy and the Mechanic working together to thwart their schemes. Meanwhile, with Jeff Tracy recovered, the rest of International Rescue find themselves dealing with one more problem - the sudden attempt by the Hood to steal the Zero-XL, having stowed away on it. Guest star: Lee Majors as Jeff Tracy. These episodes uses elements adapted from the TV Century 21 comic story "Brains is Dead".
