= The Tunnel (1933 German-language film) =

- Directed by: Curtis Bernhardt
- Written by: Bernhard Kellermann (novel); Reinhart Steinbicker; Henry Koster; Curtis Bernhardt
- Produced by: Ernst Garden
- Starring: Paul Hartmann; Attila Hörbiger; Olly von Flint; Gustaf Gründgens
- Cinematography: Carl Hoffmann
- Edited by: Gottlieb Madl
- Music by: Walter Gronostay
- Production companies: Bavaria Film; Vandor Film
- Distributed by: Bavaria Film
- Release date: 3 November 1933
- Running time: 81 minutes
- Country: Germany
- Language: German

The Tunnel (German: Der Tunnel) is a 1933 French-German science fiction film directed by Curtis Bernhardt and starring Paul Hartmann, Attila Hörbiger and Olly von Flint. The film was made by Bavaria Film, and shot at the company's Emelka Studios in Munich. It is an adaptation of Bernhard Kellermann's 1913 novel Der Tunnel about the construction of a vast tunnel under the Atlantic Ocean connecting Europe and America. It premiered at the Capitol Theatre in November 1933.

A separate French version was also produced. In 1935 the film was remade in Britain with the same title. The 1935 British film was released in the United States as Transatlantic Tunnel.

== Cast ==
- Paul Hartmann as Mac Allen
- Attila Hörbiger as Hobby
- Olly von Flint as Mary Allen
- Gustaf Gründgens as Mr. Woolf, tunnel syndicate director
- Otto Wernicke as Bärmann
- Max Weydner as Mr. Lloyd, financier
- Elga Brink as Ethel Lloyd
- Richard Ryen as Gordon
- Georg Henrich as Vandrstyfft
- Max Schreck as Chesterfield
- Magda Lena as Miss Brown
- Will Dohm as Brooce
- Ferdinand Marian as The Agitator
- Josef Eichheim as Harris, a journalist
- Günther Vogdt
- Erna Fentsch
- Beppo Brem
- Otto Brüggemann
- Friedrich Ulmer

== See also ==
- List of underwater science fiction works

== Bibliography ==
- Koepnick, Lutz. The Dark Mirror: German Cinema Between Hitler and Hollywood. University of California Press, 2002.
