= Brink of Disaster (Thunderbirds) =

- Thunderbirds episode
- Episode no.: Series 1 Episode 11
- Directed by: David Lane
- Written by: Alan Fennell
- Cinematography by: Paddy Seale
- Editing by: Harry MacDonald
- Production code: 11
- Original air date: 24 February 1966

Guest character voices
- Ray Barrett as; Selsden Joe (Helijet Pilot) Syndicate Member Villain in Convertible: Peter Dyneley as; Hugo (Syndicate Member): David Graham as; Warren Grafton Harry Malloy: Matt Zimmerman as; Stan (Helijet Pilot) Doolan (Syndicate Member) Helijet Patrol Base

Episode chronology
← Previous "Martian Invasion"	Next → "The Perils of Penelope"

"Brink of Disaster" is an episode of Thunderbirds, a British Supermarionation television series created by Gerry and Sylvia Anderson and filmed by their production company AP Films (later Century 21 Productions) for ITC Entertainment. Written by Alan Fennell and directed by David Lane, it was first broadcast on 24 February 1966 on ATV Midlands as the 22nd episode of Series One. It is the 11th episode in the official running order.

Set in the 2060s, Thunderbirds follows the missions of International Rescue, a secret organisation which uses technologically advanced rescue vehicles to save human life. The lead characters are ex‑astronaut Jeff Tracy, founder of International Rescue, and his five adult sons, who pilot the organisation's primary vehicles: the Thunderbird machines. In "Brink of Disaster", an entrepreneur goes to criminal lengths to fund his latest project: an automated monorail of questionable safety. While his associates break into Creighton-Ward Mansion to steal Lady Penelope's jewellery collection, the entrepreneur takes Jeff, Brains and Tin-Tin on a monotrain ride in a bid to secure funding from Jeff. When a helicopter crash destroys part of a bridge and cripples the monorail's automatic signals, a lack of fail-safes leaves the train speeding towards the breach, out of control.

In 1967, Century 21 released an audio adaptation of "Brink of Disaster" on EP record (catalogue number MA 124) narrated by voice actor David Graham as Parker. In 1992, Young Corgi Books published a novelisation by Dave Morris. The same year, a comic strip adaptation by Fennell was serialised in Fleetway Publications' Thunderbirds: The Comic. The episode had its first UK‑wide network broadcast on 13 March 1992 on BBC2.

== Plot ==
American entrepreneur Warren Grafton arrives at Creighton-Ward Mansion to approach Lady Penelope as a potential investment partner in his new venture: the fully-automated Pacific Atlantic suspended monorail. The meeting is delayed while Penelope, driving home in FAB 1, deals with two criminals who are tailing her – first deploying her car's smoke screen and oil slick, then using its machine guns to blast the villains' convertible off the road.

Grafton exploits Penelope's absence to locate her jewellery safe and conceal a burglar alarm-jamming device in the mansion. Parker recognises Grafton's chauffeur as Harry Malloy, an ex-mobster. On meeting Grafton, Penelope declines to invest in the monorail and refers Grafton to her industrialist friend and secret employer, Jeff Tracy. Although Grafton has clashed with the United States government over inadequate safety measures, Jeff agrees to ride the monorail before making up his mind about the project, joined by Brains and Tin-Tin as technical advisors.

Unknown to Penelope and Jeff, Grafton is the head of a crime syndicate. Meeting his associates, Grafton outlines his plan to fill a gap in the monorail's funding: Malloy and fellow syndicate member Selsden will break into Penelope's mansion and steal her multi-million-pound jewellery collection.

The next day, Grafton and his guests set off in the monotrain. Jeff is unimpressed by his host's penny-pinching attitude to safety, especially on hearing that without train staff, the passengers' only non‑automated lifeline is a fleet of patrolling helijets. Jeff's concerns prove well founded when one of the helijets is struck by lightning, forcing its pilot to eject before it crashes into a bridge. The explosion destroys a section of track and knocks out the monorail's automatic signals. No manual override exists to stop the train, so Brains and Tin-Tin devise a brake switch by modifying the power unit. Meanwhile, Jeff radios International Rescue for help, taking care not to address his sons by name to maintain secrecy. Scott and Virgil take off in Thunderbirds 1 and 2.

The switch works and the train grinds to a halt on the bridge, just feet from the break in the line. The Thunderbirds arrive. As the bridge buckles under the weight of the train, Scott directs the occupants to the middle carriage, which Virgil airlifts away using Thunderbird 2's grabs. The bridge collapses, taking the train with it. Jeff warns Grafton that he faces a lengthy jail term for his negligence.

In England, Malloy and Selsden wait until the middle of the night and launch their raid on the mansion, gaining entry undetected thanks to Grafton's jammer. However, they are unaware that the jewellery safe has its own alarm and inadvertently wake Penelope and Parker. Armed with a machine gun, Parker moves to a window and shoots out the tyres on the criminals' car to stop them getting away. Malloy and Selsden try to escape in FAB 1 but Penelope activates a remote control which locks the steering wheel, leaving them driving in circles. Malloy and Selsden are arrested and imprisoned with Grafton and the rest of the syndicate.

== Regular voice cast ==
- Sylvia Anderson as Lady Penelope
- Ray Barrett as John Tracy
- Peter Dyneley as Jeff Tracy
- Christine Finn as Tin-Tin Kyrano
- David Graham as Brains and Parker
- David Holliday as Virgil Tracy
- Shane Rimmer as Scott Tracy
- Matt Zimmerman as Alan Tracy

== Production ==
The 11th episode in the production and ITC-recommended viewing orders, "Brink of Disaster" is one of several early episodes that were extended from 25 to 50 minutes after Lew Grade – the owner of APF, who had been impressed by the 25-minute version of the first episode, "Trapped in the Sky" – ordered the runtime doubled so the series would fill an hour-long timeslot. In the case of "Brink of Disaster", the story was expanded by adding a subplot revealing Grafton to be a crime boss, culminating in Malloy and Selsden's burglary of Creighton-Ward Mansion.

"Brink of Disaster" was filmed in January 1965 at APF's studios on the Slough Trading Estate. The monotrain model's suspension rail was adapted from a curtain rail bought from a local retailer. According to effects assistant Mike Trim, the suspension configuration was difficult to film, which is why miniature monorails in later APF productions were designed to run on model railway tracks. Some of the model shots from "Brink of Disaster" were reused in "The Perils of Penelope" to represent the Paris-Anderbad monorail.

== Broadcast and reception ==
When BBC Two began a Thunderbirds re-run in 2000, "Brink of Disaster" was one of two episodes (the other being "The Perils of Penelope") that were postponed from their November broadcast dates due to concerns that their plots involving trains might cause offence in the wake of the Hatfield rail crash. Both episodes were eventually transmitted in April 2001.

=== Critical response ===
Rating the episode three out of five, Tom Fox of Starburst magazine calls the Pacific Atlantic monotrain a "great prop" and likens Grafton and his associates to "pantomime bad guys". He considers Penelope's handling of Malloy and Selsden to be the highlight of the episode.

Marcus Hearn suggests that put together, the episode's two distinct storylines (the monorail disaster and the mansion burglary) are too "thinly connected" to remain truly credible. However, he argues that either premise could service an entire episode on its own, adding that parts of the story "[remind] us that Thunderbirds can be just as entertaining when it breaks from its rescue format." He compares FAB 1's gadgets to those on the Aston Martin DB5 in the James Bond films Goldfinger and Thunderball.

Richard Farrell praises the editing of the scenes showing the runaway monotrain. He comments that the episode highlights the dangers of increased automation, describing the monotrain as a "literal representation of technology running out of control". According to Farrell, parts of the plot are reminiscent of the German science fiction novel Der Tunnel, in which the building of a transatlantic tunnel is halted when the construction company goes bankrupt. On the characterisation, he argues that Warren Grafton and Jeff Tracy represent two sides of capitalism – the former being portrayed as a greedy, criminal entrepreneur, the latter an honest industrialist.
