= Kainer =

Kainer is a surname. Notable people with it include:

- Don Kainer (born 1955), American former professional baseball player
- Lene Schneider-Kainer (1885–1971), Jewish-Austrian painter
- Ludwig Kainer (1885–1967), German graphic artist, draftsman, painter, illustrator, film architect and costume designer
