= Comet Chasers =

- Thunderbirds Are Go episode
- Episode no.: Series 1 Episode 21
- Directed by: David Scott
- Written by: Randolph Heard
- Cinematography by: Simon Godsiff
- Editing by: Louise Pattinson
- Original air date: 19 December 2015
- Running time: 22 minutes

Guest voice cast
- Jack Whitehall as Francois Lemaire; Taj Atwal as Madeline Lemaire

Episode chronology
← Previous "The Hexpert"	Next → "Designated Driver"

"Comet Chasers" is an episode of Thunderbirds Are Go. The episode aired in the UK on CITV and ITV on 19 December 2015. The episode features a guest appearance from comedian Jack Whitehall. Main characters Kayo Kyrano, Virgil Tracy and Gordon Tracy appear at the beginning but do not speak.

== Plot ==
The episode begins with Alan Tracy talking about flying to Halley's Comet in his sleep. He is woken by Scott and Grandma. Grandma informs him about a broadcast to do with Halley's comet. Alan starts to state facts about the comet – something that, according to Scott, he has done before. The broadcast begins with Francois Lemaire and his wife Madeline visiting the comet, during which Lemaire decides to go inside the comet's tail. Scott yells at the broadcast about it being a bad idea, and John pops up stating that they have a situation.

John briefs Alan and Scott on the details of the emergency and they launch in Thunderbird 3. In space, Scott tells Alan that Lemaire's ship is still intact, but Alan is more interested in the comet. Scott reminds Alan that they are on a mission and have to remain focused on that.

On Lemaire's ship, Lemaire is checking his ship's controls. Madeline fires the emergency beacon, which Thunderbird 3 picks up. Alan informs Scott. Lemaire mentions all the times he has had to be rescued. Alan and Scott are unable to establish communication with the Lemaires, so Scott takes a pod vehicle to go and rescue them. He finds it hard to avoid the rocks until Alan tells him to imagine that he is playing a game. When Scott reaches the ship, he still cannot raise the Lemaires, so he decides to dock. Finally making contact, he orders the Lemaires to put on their spacesuits and prepare to abandon ship. Suddenly a large rock hits the ship. Alan becomes worried when he loses contact with Scott, but Scott is able to reach Alan, informing him that they are on the comet.

Scott enters the ship to assess the damage. Lemaire remembers Scott from the last time he was rescued. Unimpressed when Scott begins tearing the ship apart to try to get it running again, Lemaire threatens to sue International Rescue for damages. Scott contacts Alan to collect them. Scott and the Lemaires jump over bits of the comet until they see the ship destroyed by the comet. Alan lands near them and exits Thunderbird 3 so that he can stand on the comet. The comet shakes, throwing Lemaire into space, and Alan goes to rescue him. Scott sends Alan his space board. Alan surfs back to Thunderbird 3 and they take off. During the departure, Thunderbird 3 takes damage, preventing it from return to Earth for 36 hours. When Lemaire complains about there being no food, Scott informs them that Brains made ration bars for long journeys and that they are in the bin.

== Reception ==
Fred McNamara, writing for Screen Relish, stated that "'Comet Chasers' will surely be brushed aside as one of the few bland episodes of Thunderbirds Are Go there's been so far, but sadly this is an episode where what goes wrong outweighs what goes right." He added that the episode "has next to no fire in its belly, and whatever flames may be stirring just don't know how to blaze away. This is a crying shame, because it starts off as an interesting development on Alan's character and his fascination with outer space, but any sense of development is sidelined thanks to a rescue we'd rather not see and a script that has more debris floating around inside than Halley's Comet itself."

Paul Simpson, writing for Sci-Fi Bulletin, gave the episode a 7 out of 10 rating. He stated that Whitehall "gives a spot-on vocal performance as the exceptionally irritating and self-absorbed explorer at the heart of this tale, Francois Lemaire, which sees Scott and Alan take Thunderbird 3 (and its pod) through an asteroid field – with a nicely done reference to gaming a moment or two after the thought strikes the viewer that that's what is going on." Simpson added: "It's quite a simple linear episode but there's nothing wrong with the occasional "straightforward" rescue!"

Ian Cullen of scifipulse.net praised the "fantastic" space visuals as well as the music, calling the latter "as thrilling as the action". Adding that the rescue of the Lemaires seemed "a little too easy", he commented that the story "could have been a little more interesting had [it] had been a two-part episode with a few more problems thrown the way of Alan and Scott."
