= The Devil in the Bottle =

- Directed by: Heinz Hilpert; Reinhart Steinbicker; Raoul Ploquin
- Written by: Philipp Lothar Mayring; Georges Neveux; Ludwig von Wohl
- Produced by: Raoul Ploquin; Karl Ritter
- Starring: Käthe von Nagy; Pierre Blanchar; Gina Manès
- Cinematography: Fritz Arno Wagner
- Music by: Theo Mackeben
- Production company: UFA
- Distributed by: L'Alliance Cinématographique Européenne
- Release date: 5 April 1935
- Running time: 95 minutes
- Countries: France; Germany
- Language: French

The Devil in the Bottle (French: Le diable en bouteille) is a 1935 French-German drama film directed by Heinz Hilpert, Reinhart Steinbicker and Raoul Ploquin. It stars Käthe von Nagy, Pierre Blanchar and Gina Manès. It was made by the German studio UFA as a French-language remake of its 1934 film Liebe, Tod und Teufel. Both films are based on Robert Louis Stevenson's story The Bottle Imp. The film's sets were designed by the art directors Otto Hunte and Willy Schiller.

== Cast ==
- Käthe von Nagy as Kolua
- Pierre Blanchar as Keave
- Gina Manès as Rubby
- Paul Azaïs as Lopaka
- Gabriel Gabrio as Mounier
- Roger Karl as Le marchand
- Marguerite de Morlaye as La comtesse
- Suzy Pierson as Bertie - La femme de chambre
- Georges Malkine as Vikhom
- Roger Legris as Tirill
- Daniel Mendaille as Jerry
- Bill Bocket as Balmez
- Léon Roger-Maxime as Hein
- Philippe Richard as Macco
- Gaston Dubosc as Le comte
- Henri Richard as Le notaire
- Gaston Mauger as Collins
- Henri Bosc as Le gouverneur

== Bibliography ==
- Goble, Alan. The Complete Index to Literary Sources in Film. Walter de Gruyter, 1999.
