= Love, Death and the Devil =

1934 German drama film

- Directed by: Heinz Hilpert; Reinhart Steinbicker
- Written by: Liselotte Gravenstein; Kurt Heuser; Josef Pelz von Felinau
- Based on: The Bottle Imp by Robert Louis Stevenson
- Produced by: Karl Ritter
- Starring: Käthe von Nagy; Albin Skoda; Brigitte Horney
- Cinematography: Fritz Arno Wagner
- Edited by: Wolfgang Becker
- Music by: Theo Mackeben
- Production company: UFA
- Distributed by: UFA
- Release date: 21 December 1934
- Running time: 105 minutes
- Country: Germany
- Language: German

Love, Death and the Devil (German: Liebe, Tod und Teufel) is a 1934 German drama film directed by Heinz Hilpert and Reinhart Steinbicker and starring Käthe von Nagy, Albin Skoda and Brigitte Horney. It is based on Robert Louis Stevenson's story The Bottle Imp.

The film's sets were designed by the art director Otto Hunte and Willy Schiller. The following year UFA's French subsidiary released a French-language version of the film The Devil in the Bottle.

== Main cast ==
- Käthe von Nagy as Kokua
- Albin Skoda as Kiwe
- Brigitte Horney as Ruby
- Karl Hellmer as Lopaka
- Aribert Wäscher as Mounier
- Erich Ponto as The Old Man
- Paul Dahlke as The Governor
- Rudolf Platte as Spunda
- Josef Dahmen as Macco
- Hans Kettler as Balmer
- Karl Hannemann as Hein
- Oskar Sima as Kiano
- Albert Florath as The Notary

== Bibliography ==
- Bock, Hans-Michael; Bergfelder, Tim, eds. (2009). The Concise Cinegraph: Encyclopaedia of German Cinema. New York: Berghahn Books. ISBN 978-1-57181-655-9.
- Hull, David Stewart (1973). Film in the Third Reich: Art and Propaganda in Nazi Germany. New York: Simon and Schuster. ISBN 978-0-671-21486-9.
