= Reinhart Steinbicker =

German screenwriter and film director

- Born: 3 September 1904; Lemgo, Principality of Lippe
- Died: August 1935 (aged 30–31); Berlin, Germany
- Occupations: Writer, Director
- Years active: 1932-1935 (film)

Reinhart Steinbicker (1904–1935) was a German screenwriter and film director.

== Selected filmography ==
- Invisible Opponent (1933)
- The Oil Sharks (1933)
- The Tunnel (1933, French)
- The Tunnel (1933, German)
- The Prodigal Son (1934)
- Love, Death and the Devil (1934)
- The Devil in the Bottle (1935)

== Bibliography ==
- Goble, Alan. The Complete Index to Literary Sources in Film. Walter de Gruyter, 1999.
