= Nameless Heroes (film) =

1925 film

- Directed by: Curtis Bernhardt
- Written by: Curtis Bernhardt; Stephan Lorant; Hans Székely
- Produced by: Willi Münzenberg
- Cinematography: Marius Holdt
- Production company: Prometheus Film
- Release date: 1925
- Country: Germany
- Languages: Silent; German intertitles

Nameless Heroes (German:Namenlose Helden) is a 1925 German silent film directed by Curtis Bernhardt. Only a fragment of the film still survives. It was made by the Communist-controlled Prometheus Film.

== Cast ==
In alphabetical order

- Marga Becker
- Max Grünberg
- Annemarie Hase
- Heinz Hilpert as Munitionsfabrikant
- Hermann Hoffmann
- Erwin Kalser as Scholz
- Ernst Pittschau
- Lili Schoenborn-Anspach as Frau Scholz
- Karl Siebrecht
- Martha Tiedt
- Irma von Cube
- Max von Schwarzenberg

== Bibliography ==
- Ashkenazi, Ofer. Weimar Film and Modern Jewish Identity. Palgrave Macmillan, 2012.
