= The Brothers Schellenberg =

1926 film directed by Karl Grune

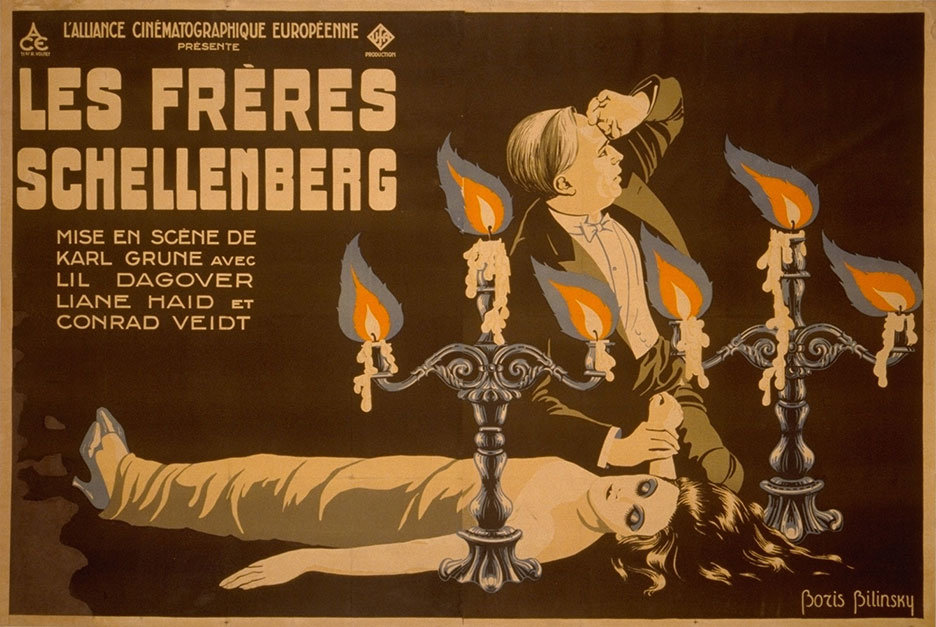
- Poster by Boris Bilinsky
- Directed by: Karl Grune
- Written by: Willy Haas; Karl Grune
- Based on: The Brothers Schellenberg by Bernhard Kellermann
- Produced by: Erich Pommer
- Starring: Conrad Veidt; Lil Dagover; Liane Haid; Henri De Vries
- Cinematography: Curt Courant; Karl Hasselmann
- Music by: Werner R. Heymann; Erno Rapee
- Production company: Universum Film AG
- Distributed by: Universum Film AG
- Release date: 22 March 1926
- Running time: 113 minutes
- Country: Germany
- Languages: Silent; German intertitles

The Brothers Schellenberg (German: Die Brüder Schellenberg) is a 1926 German silent drama film directed by Karl Grune and starring Conrad Veidt, Lil Dagover and Liane Haid. It was shot at the Babelsberg Studios in Berlin with sets designed by the art director Karl Görge. It was based on a novel by Bernhard Kellermann. It premiered at the Palast-am-Zoo.

== Cast ==
- Conrad Veidt as Wenzel Schellenberg / Michael Schellenberg
- Lil Dagover as Esther
- Liane Haid as Jenny Florian
- Henri De Vries as Der alte Rauchenstein
- Werner Fuetterer as Georg Weidenbach
- Bruno Kastner as Kaczinsky
- Julius Falkenstein as Erster Verehrer Esthers
- Wilhelm Bendow as Sweiter Verehrer Esthers
- Erich Kaiser-Titz as Dritter Verehrer Esthers
- Paul Morgan as Schieber
- Jaro Fürth as Wucherer
- Frida Richard as Verarmte Witwe

== Bibliography ==
- Kreimeier, Klaus. The Ufa Story: A History of Germany's Greatest Film Company, 1918-1945. University of California Press, 1999.
