= Heinz Hilpert =

German actor, screenwriter and film director

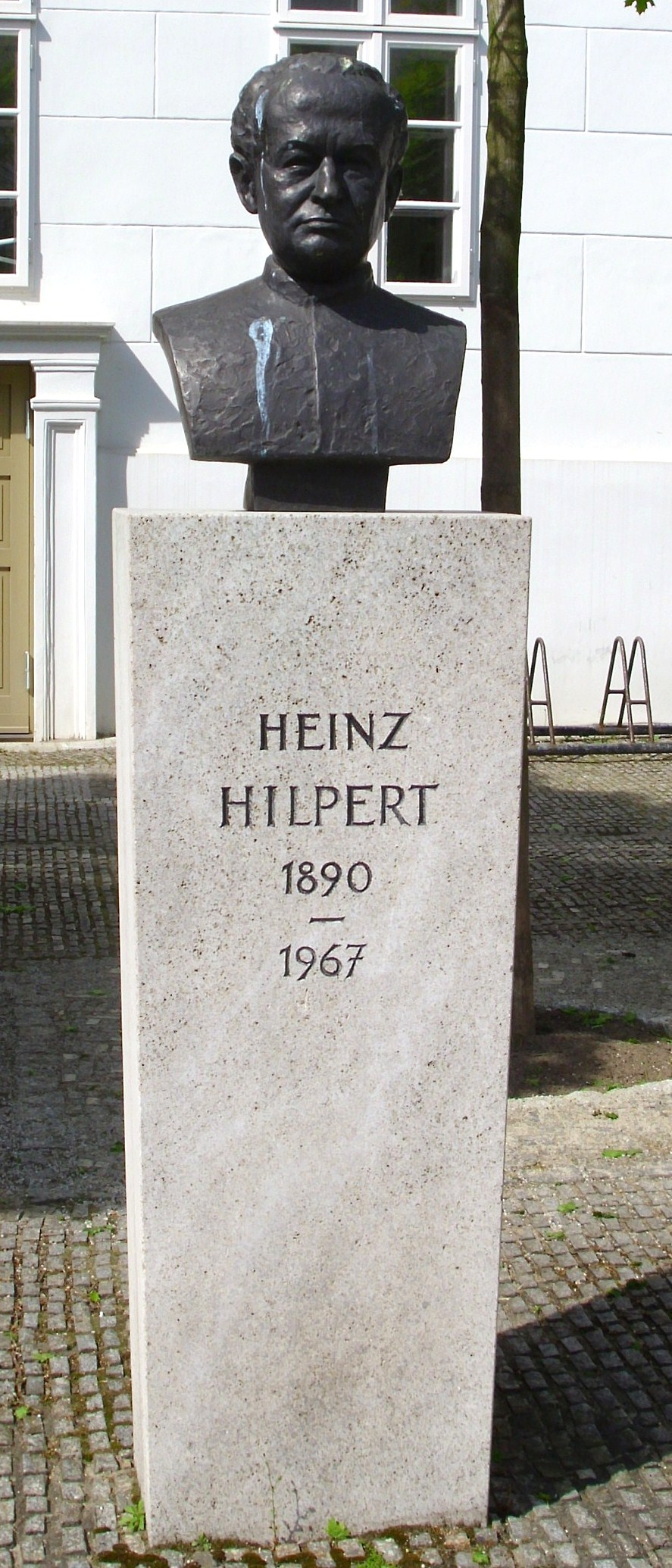
- Bust of Heinz Hilpert at the Deutsches Theater in Berlin
- Born: 1 March 1890; Berlin, German Empire
- Died: 25 November 1967 (aged 77); Göttingen, West Germany
- Occupations: Actor, screenwriter, director

Heinz Hilpert (1 March 1890 – 25 November 1967) was a German actor, screenwriter and film director. He was head of the Deutsches Theater during the Third Reich.

== Life and work ==
After training as a primary school teacher in Berlin, Hilpert studied German, philosophy and art history at the Friedrich Wilhelm University and began working as an actor at the Berliner Volksbühne in 1919 playing in the film Brothers. Max Reinhardt brought him to the Deutsches Theater Berlin in 1926 and made him his senior director. There he staged the premiere of Der Hauptmann von Köpenick on March 5, 1931, achieving one of his greatest successes. In the same year he staged the premiere of Tales from the Vienna Woods. After his brief return to the Volksbühne in 1932 as director, the National Socialists made him director of the Deutsches Theater in 1934 and thus the direct successor to Max Reinhardt, who had been driven into exile. He remained director until the Berlin theaters closed on September 1, 1944.

In 1935, Joseph Goebbels appointed him a member of the Reich Cultural Senate. After the annexation of Austria, Hilpert was also director of the Theater in der Josefstadt from 1938 to 1945. During the Nazi era, Hilpert stood up for the persecuted and was able to maintain a certain artistic freedom in his theaters. Hilpert also occasionally worked as an actor and director for films.

After the Second World War, Hilpert initially had great problems continuing his theater work because of his career under the Nazis. He lived in Zurich for a time and staged performances in Vienna, Salzburg and Zurich, where he premiered Zuckmayer's Des Teufels General at the Schauspielhaus on December 14, 1946. In 1947 he became director of the theater in Frankfurt am Main for one season. After the successful re-establishment of the theater in Konstanz in 1949, he became director in Göttingen in 1950. He stayed here until 1966 and made the Deutsches Theater Göttingen one of the leading theaters in the young Federal Republic. As a close friend of Zuckmayer, he premiered his works The Song in the Fire Furnace (1950) and Ulla Winblad (1954. He is also responsible for the German premiere of the drama Conflict in Assyria (September 15, 1957), a political-satirical allegory of Nazi rule in the guise of the biblical Esther myth, by Walter Hasenclever, which was only released in London under the title Trouble in Assyria was staged in English (April 30, 1939). After 1966 he worked as a freelance director.

== Selected filmography ==
Actor

- Nameless Heroes (1925)
- Prinz Louis Ferdinand (1927)
- His Royal Highness (1953)
- The Golden Plague (1954)
- Die Barrings (1955)
- Roses in Autumn (1955)
- Three Girls from the Rhine (1955)

Director

- Three Days of Love (1931)
- Love, Death and the Devil (1934)
- Lady Windermere's Fan (1935)
- The Devil in the Bottle (1935)

== Bibliography ==
- Hortmann, Wilhelm & Hamburger, Michael. Shakespeare on the German Stage: The Twentieth Century. Cambridge University Press, 1998.
