= The Tunnel (1933 French-language film) =

- A poster advertising the film
- Directed by: Curtis Bernhardt
- Written by: Reinhart Steinbicker; Alexandre Arnoux; Curtis Bernhardt
- Based on: The Tunnel by Bernhard Kellermann
- Starring: Jean Gabin; Madeleine Renaud; Robert Le Vigan; Edmond Van Daële
- Cinematography: Carl Hoffmann
- Edited by: Rudi Fehr
- Music by: Walter Gronostay
- Production companies: Bavaria Film; Vandor Film
- Distributed by: Ciné France Films
- Release date: 15 December 1933
- Running time: 72 minutes
- Countries: France; Germany
- Language: French

The Tunnel (French: Le Tunnel) is a 1933 French-German science fiction film directed by Curtis Bernhardt and starring Jean Gabin, Madeleine Renaud and Robert Le Vigan. It was the French language version of the German film The Tunnel, with a different cast and some changes to the plot. Both were followed in 1935 by an English version. Such Multiple-language versions were common in the years immediately following the introduction of sound, before the practice of dubbing had come to dominate international releases. Germany and France made a significant number of films together at this time.

The film is an adaptation of Bernhard Kellermann's 1913 novel Der Tunnel about the construction of a vast tunnel under the Atlantic Ocean connecting Europe and America. The film's Jewish director Bernhardt had fled Germany following the Nazi takeover, but returned briefly to shoot exterior scenes after being granted special permission by the German government.

== Cast ==
- Jean Gabin as Allan Mac Allan
- Madeleine Renaud as Mary Mac Allan
- Robert Le Vigan as Brooce, un ouvrier félon
- Edmond Van Daële as Le contremaître
- André Nox as Lloyd
- Pierre Nay as Hobby
- Gustaf Gründgens as Woolf
- André Bertic as Gordon
- Philippe Richard as Harryman
- Raymonde Allain as Ethel Lloyd
- Victor Vina as L'orateur
- Henri Valbel as Un ouvrier
- Alexandre Arnoux
- William Burke
- Henry Trévoux

== See also ==
- 1933 in science fiction
- List of underwater science fiction works

== Bibliography ==
- Phillips, Alastair. City of Darkness, City of Light: Émigré Filmmakers in Paris, 1929-1939. Amsterdam University Press, 2004.
