= The Tunnel (1915 film) =

1915 film

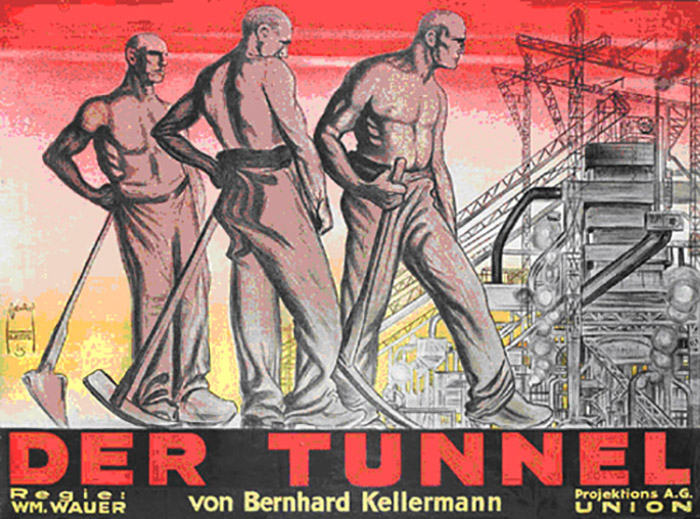
- Directed by: William Wauer
- Written by: Bernhard Kellermann (novel); William Wauer
- Produced by: Paul Davidson
- Starring: Friedrich Kayssler; Fritzi Massary; Hermann Vallentin; Felix Basch
- Cinematography: Axel Graatkjær
- Production company: PAGU
- Distributed by: Imperator-Film
- Release date: 1915
- Running time: 97 minutes
- Country: Germany
- Languages: Silent; German intertitles

The Tunnel (German:Der Tunnel) is a 1915 German silent drama film directed by William Wauer and starring Friedrich Kayssler, Fritzi Massary and Hermann Vallentin. It is the first of several film adaptations of Bernhard Kellermann's 1913 novel The Tunnel about the construction of a vast tunnel under the Atlantic Ocean connecting Europe and America. The film was made by Paul Davidson's PAGU production company, with sets designed by art director Hermann Warm.

It still survives, unlike many films from the era, and was restored in 2010.

Adolf Hitler was reported to be affected by both the film and the novel, finding that the power of oratory could influence masses and change the course of human events.

== Cast ==
- Friedrich Kayssler
- Fritzi Massary
- Hermann Vallentin
- Felix Basch
- Hans Halden
- Rose Veldtkirch

== Bibliography ==
- Hake, Sabine. Popular Cinema of the Third Reich. University of Texas Press, 2001.
- Domarus, Max. "Hitler, Speeches and Proclamations1932–1945 - The Chronicle of a Dictatorship, Volume One: The Years 1932 to 1934." BOLCHAZY-CARDUCCI Publishers, 1990.
