= The Tunnel (Kellermann novel) =

1913 novel by Bernard Kellermann

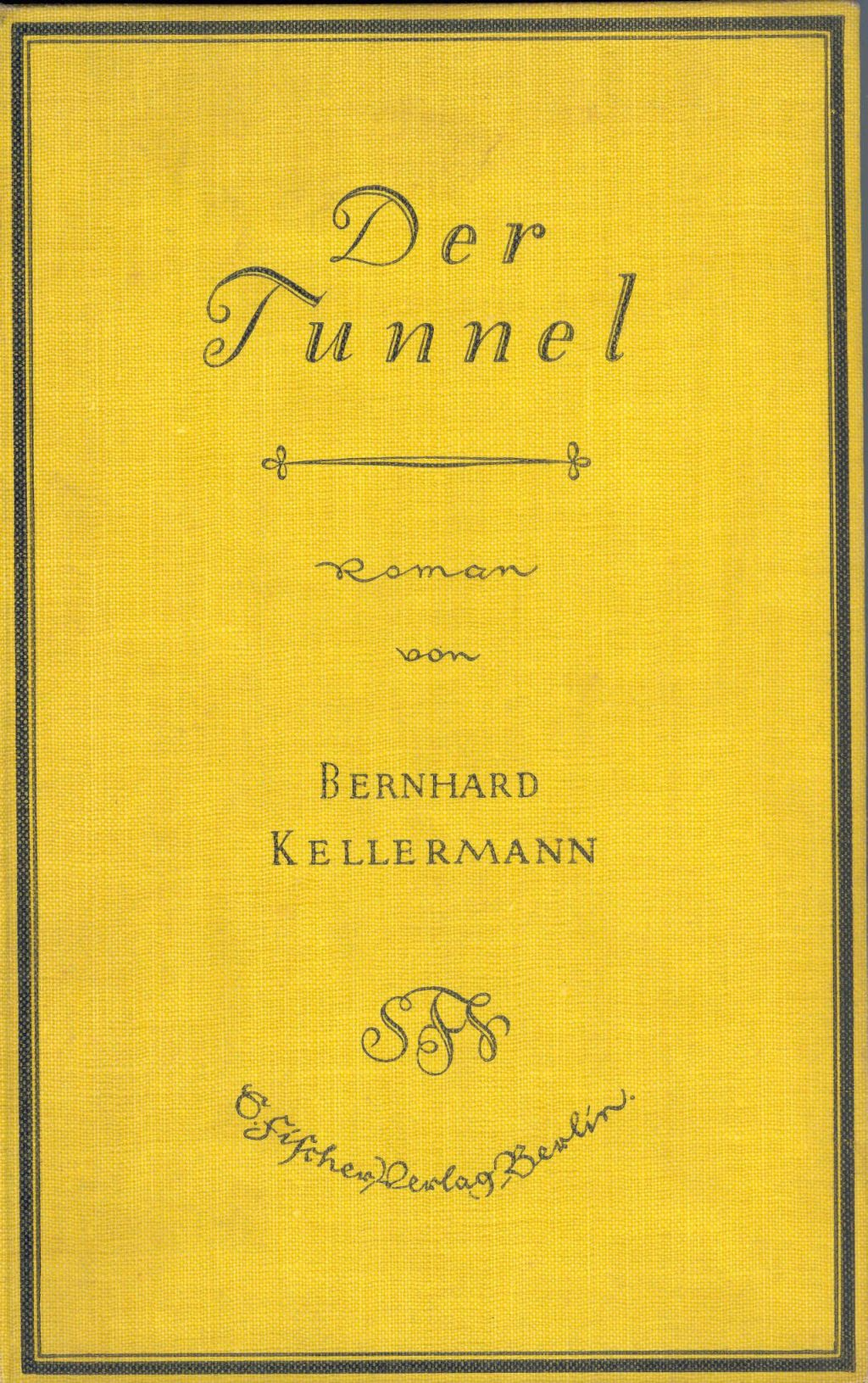
- Author: Bernhard Kellermann
- Original title: Der Tunnel
- Language: German
- Publisher: S. Fischer Verlag
- Publication date: 1913
- Publication place: German
- English publication date: 1915
- Pages: 402

The Tunnel (German: Der Tunnel) is a novel by Bernhard Kellermann published in April 1913. The novel sold 100,000 copies in the six months after its publication, and it became one of the most successful books of the first half of the 20th century. By 1939 its circulation had reached millions. The main theme of the novel is social progress, particularly with respect to modern technology. It was published in English in 1915 through Hodder and Stoughton in the United Kingdom and Macaulay and Co. in the United States.

== Plot ==
Allan, an idealistic engineer, wants to build a tunnel at the bottom of the Atlantic Ocean connecting North America with Europe within a few years. The idealist's scheme is thwarted for financial reasons, and the tunnel construction (in particular a segment dug under a mountain) experiences several disasters. A fiasco seems inevitable, the army of workers revolt, and Allan becomes a figure of universal hatred throughout the world. After 26 years of construction, the tunnel is finally completed; however, the engineering masterpiece is outdated as soon as it opens, as aeroplanes now cross the Atlantic in a few hours.

== Reception ==
The reception of the book and its sentiments was extremely positive, and was on its publication a success for Kellermann. The story anticipated important social events as the Great Depression, and had the charm of a parallel world history of a 1920s and 1930s in which the First World War never occurred. It also made the critical observation that technology always becomes outdated with its application.

== Film adaptations ==
A scene from Der Tunnel (1933)

Four films have been based on the book. The first was The Tunnel in 1915, a silent film directed by William Wauer. Rudolf Olden, in his book Hitler the Pawn, says that Adolf Hitler saw this film in Vienna, talked about it for days and was mesmerized by the lead character "who rouses the working masses by his speeches". Three films were released in 1933 and 1935, one version each in German (Der Tunnel), French (Le Tunnel) and English (The Tunnel, renamed Transatlantic Tunnel in the US). The French and German versions were directed by Curtis Bernhardt and the English by Maurice Elvey. At the time it was not unusual to release a film in separate versions in different languages, each using different actors or directors, but utilising the same sets and locations.

== See also ==
- Transatlantic tunnel
- List of underwater science fiction works
