= Lene Schneider-Kainer =

- Born: Lene Schneider; May 16, 1885; Vienna, Austria
- Died: June 15, 1971 (aged 86); Cochabamba, Bolivia
- Known for: Painting
- Style: Erotic art
- Spouse: Ludwig Kainer (1910-1926)

Lene Schneider-Kainer, born Lene Schneider (1885 – 1971), was a Jewish-Austrian painter, daughter of the painter Sigmund Schneider, noted for her illustration of "Lukian:Hetärengespräche. Mit Illustrationen von Lene Schneider-Kainer und einem Nachwort von Sabine Dahmen".

== Life and art ==
She started her art studies in Vienna, and continued in Munich, Paris and Amsterdam. During a stay in Paris she met her future husband, Ludwig Kainer, a doctor, painter, graphic designer, poster artist and stage designer from Munich, whom she married in 1910. From about 1911 the couple belonged to a circle of artists and intellectuals that included Arnold Schönberg, Franz Werfel, Herwarth Walden and his wife, Else Lasker-Schüler. Between 1912 and 1926 she lived in Berlin at 78 Niebuhrstraße in Charlottenburg. In 1914/15 Schneider-Kainer produced a strong and expressive oil painting of the poet and playwright Else Lasker-Schüler.

Schneider-Kainer made her debut as an artist in 1917 with an exhibition of some 50 oil paintings and drawings at the Galerie Gurlitt, shocking the art world of Berlin. There was an uproar over 30 erotic images, illustrating Wieland's 1788 German translation of the "Dialogues of the Courtesans (Hetaerae)" by Lucian.

The artistic highpoint of Schneider-Kainer's career was in the years from 1919 to 1922 with the production of lithographic erotic portfolios with titles such as "Ten female acts" and "Before the Mirror." In the 1920s Schneider-Kainer became renowned as painter and illustrator, enjoying great acclaim in Berlin and selling her works abroad.

In 1926, Schneider-Kainer left Berlin after her divorce and for two years accompanied the poet Bernhard Kellermann on an extended odyssey, often by donkey or caravan, visiting Russia, Persia, India, Burma, Thailand, Vietnam, Tibet, Hongkong and China. In her memoirs, she wrote:

We travelled through many countries and regions, which had never seen a camera, where the inhabitants either fled from the camera or became nuisances through their insatiable curiosity.... they found it astounding that a woman could draw and write.

She painted, photographed and sketched her impressions, and these contributions appeared regularly in the Berliner Tageblatt. On her return via the Trans-Siberian Railway, she presented a selection of her works from Asia in Berlin, Magdeburg, Stuttgart, Kiel, London and Rome, and produced illustrations for the magazine, "Die Dame". She did not return to Germany after a 1932 trip to the Balearic Islands because of the power takeover by the National Socialists. After this she settled on Mallorca, and later on Ibiza, where she started an artists' colony. With the outbreak of the Spanish Civil War, she left for New York. Under a pseudonym she published washable fabric children's books.

She had successful exhibitions in Mallorca, Barcelona, Copenhagen, New York City and Philadelphia. In 1954 she settled in Bolivia, where she assisted her son in establishing a textile factory producing Native American designs for export to the United States.

== Bibliography ==
- Dahmen, Sabine: Leben und Werk der jüdischen Künstlerin Lene Schneider-Kainer im Berlin der 20er Jahre. Dortmund: Ed. Ebersbach, 1999
