= Curtis Bernhardt =

German film director (1899–1981)

- Born: Kurt Bernhardt; April 15, 1899; Worms, Germany
- Died: February 22, 1981 (aged 81); Pacific Palisades, Los Angeles, California, US
- Occupation: Film director
- Spouse: Pearl Argyle (1937–1947; her death)
- Children: 2

Curtis Bernhardt (15 April 1899 – 22 February 1981) was a German film director born in Worms, Germany, under the name Kurt Bernhardt.

== Career ==
He trained as an actor in Germany, and performed on the stage, before starting as a film director in 1924, with Nameless Heroes. Other films include A Stolen Life (1946) and Sirocco (1951).

Bernhardt made films in Germany from 1925 until 1933, when he was forced to flee the Third Reich — which briefly had him arrested — because he was Jewish. Bernhardt directed films in France and England before moving on to Hollywood to work for Warner Brothers in 1940. He produced and directed his last Hollywood picture, Kisses for My President (1964), about the nation's first female Chief Executive starring Polly Bergen and Fred MacMurray.

He is interred at Glendale's Forest Lawn Memorial Park Cemetery, near his wife, Pearl Argyle Wellman Bernhardt.

== Filmography ==
- Nameless Heroes (short) (as Kurt Bernhardt) (1924)
- Torments of the Night (as Kurt Bernhardt) (1926)
- Orphan of Lowood (as Kurt Bernhardt) (1926)
- Children's Souls Accuse You (as Kurt Bernhardt) (1927)
- The Girl with the Five Zeros (as Kurt Bernhardt) (1927)
- The Prince of Rogues (as Kurt Bernhardt) (1928)
- The Last Fort (as Kurt Bernhardt) (1929)
- The Woman One Longs For aka The Woman Men Yearn For (as Kurt Bernhardt) (1929)
- The Last Company (as Kurt Bernhardt) (1930)
- L'Homme qui assassina (as Kurt Bernhardt) (1930)
- The Man Who Murdered (as Kurt Bernhardt) (1931)
- The Rebel (as Kurt Bernhardt) (1932)
- The Tunnel (as Kurt Bernhardt) (1933)
- Le tunnel (as Kurt Bernhardt) (1933)
- Gold in the Street (1934)
- The Beloved Vagabond (as Kurt Bernhardt) (1936)
- Chaste Susanne (1937)
- The Girl in the Taxi (1937)
- Le vagabond bien-aimé (as Kurt Bernhardt) (1937)
- Crossroads (as Kurt Bernhardt) (1938)
- Night in December (as Kurt Bernhardt) (1940)
- My Love Came Back (as Kurt Bernhardt) (1940)
- Lady with Red Hair (as Kurt Bernhardt) (1940)
- Million Dollar Baby (1941)
- Juke Girl (1942)
- Happy Go Lucky (1943)
- Conflict (1945)
- My Reputation (1946)
- Devotion (1946)
- A Stolen Life (1946)
- High Wall (1947)
- Possessed (1947)
- The Doctor and the Girl (1949)
- Sirocco (1951)
- Payment on Demand (1951)
- The Blue Veil (1951)
- The Merry Widow (1952)
- Miss Sadie Thompson (1953)
- Beau Brummell (1954)
- Interrupted Melody (1955)
- Gaby (1956)
- Stefanie in Rio (1960)
- Damon and Pythias (1962)
- Kisses for My President (1964)
