= Bernhard Kellermann =

German author and poet (1879–1951)

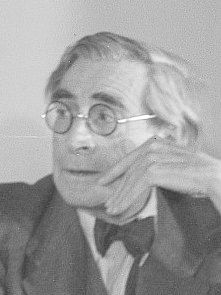
Bernhard Kellermann (1949)

Bernhard Kellermann (4 March 1879, Fürth, Kingdom of Bavaria – 17 October 1951) was a German author and poet.

== Life ==
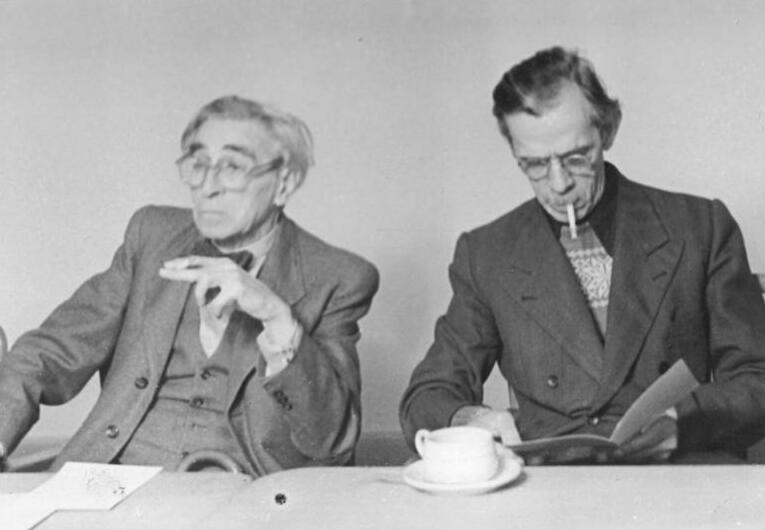
Bernhard Kellermann and Professor Otto Nagel, Painter, president of the Academy of Arts

Bernhard Kellermann enrolled in 1899 at the Technical University of Munich initially in general studies, but later focused on German literature and painting. Beginning in 1904 he built a reputation as a novelist with early works such as Yester and Li, and reached extraordinary success through 1939 with 183 printings.

The novel Ingeborg (1906) achieved an impressive 131 printings (until 1939).

In the years before World War I his novels were published following journeys in the United States and Japan. His novel Das Meer (The Sea) was made into film by Peter Paul Felner and Sofar-Film-Produktion GmbH, featuring prominent film stars. His main work was Der Tunnel in 1913. It was highly successful for both him and his publisher, S. Fischer Verlag: circulation exceeded one million, and the work was translated into 25 languages. Kellermann's works became more critical of society and directly related to real-world events; his previous writings were marked with impressionism and prose. During World War I, Kellermann worked as a correspondent for the Berliner Tageblatt [Berlin's Daily Journal], one of Berlin's most influential newspapers, and published several war reports.

In 1920, his novel Der 9. November (The Ninth of November) appeared, which argued critically against the behavior of soldiers and officers in relation to the people. This book doomed Kellermann during the Nazi era.

Beginning in 1922, he produced numerous novellas and short stories. In 1926 Kellermann became a member of the Prussian poet academy, from which he was excluded 1933. In 1926, he divorced Lene Schneider-Kainer while on an extended odyssey of two years, often traveling by donkey or caravan visiting Russia, Persia, India, Burma, Thailand, Vietnam, Tibet, Hongkong and China.

His novel The Ninth November was banned and burned publicly. Kellermann did not flee the country and offered no resistance, but wrote dime novels. After the collapse of the Nazi dictatorship, Kellermann worked with Johannes R. Becher in the Cultural Association of the GDR. He was a member of East Germany's Volkskammer as well as chairmen of the Society for German-Soviet Friendship. His commitment in the postwar years to East Germany caused a boycott of West German booksellers. His name was forgotten. Even shortly before his death in 1951 he rallied the writers of both German states to push for unified deliberations.

Bernhard Kellermann is buried in the New Cemetery at Potsdam. His grave is preserved.

== Works ==
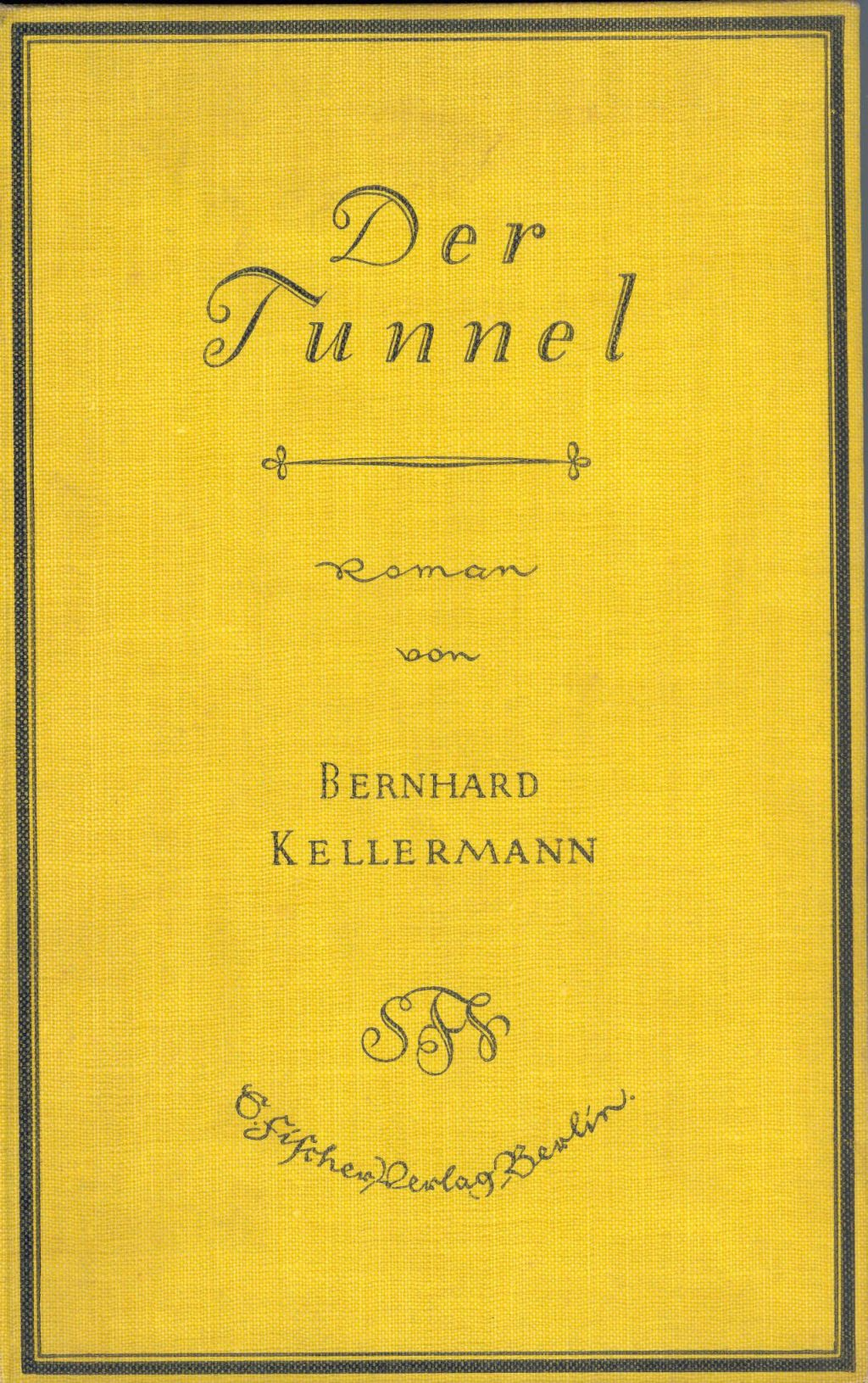
Bernhard Kellermann's most popular work sold millions in 25 languages and was made into four movies

- Yester und Li, novel (1904)
- Ingeborg, novel (1906)
- Der Tor, novel (1909)
- Das Meer [The Sea], novel (1910)
- Ein Spaziergang in Japan, Reisebericht [A Walk in Japan], travelogue (1910)
- Sassa yo Yassa. Japanische Tänze [Japanese Dances] (1911)
- Der Tunnel [The Tunnel], novel (1913)
- Der Krieg im Westen, Kriegsbericht [The war in the West, War Report] (1915)
- Krieg im Argonnerwald, Kriegsbericht [War in the Argonner Forest, War Report] (1916)
- Der 9. November [The Ninth of November], novel (1920)
- Die Heiligen [The Saints], novel (1922)
- Schwedenklees Erlebnis [Swedish Clover Experience] (1923)
- Die Brüder Schellenberg [The Brothers Schellenberg], novel (1925)
- Die Wiedertäufer von Münster [The Anabaptists of Muenster], drama (1925)
- Auf Persiens Karawanenstraßen [Persian Caravan Roads], travelogue (1928)
- Der Weg der Götter. Indien, Klein-Tibet, Siam [The Path of the Gods. India, Little Tibet, Siam], travelogue (1929)
- Die Stadt Anatol (City of Anatol), novel (1932)
- Jang-tse-kiang (1934)
- Lied der Freundschaft [Songs of Friendship] (1935)
- Das blaue Band [The Blue Band] (1938)
- Meine Reisen in Asien [My travels in Asia] (1940)
- Georg Wendlandts Umkehr [George Wendlandt's Reversal] (1941)
- Was sollen wir tun? [What are we to do?], essay (1945)
- Totentanz (1948)
- "Wir kommen aus Sowjetrußland" [We come from Soviet Russia], report (1948)

=== Posthumously ===
- Bernhard Kellermann zum Gedenken. Aufsätze, Briefe, Reden 1945-1951 [Bernhard Kellermann in memory: Essays, letters, speeches] (1952)

== See also ==
- The Brothers Schellenberg (1926 film)
- The Tunnel (1935 film)
- German science fiction literature
