= List of films: G =

indexed lists of films
0–9	A	B	C	D	E	F
G	H	I	J–K	L	M	N–O
P	Q–R	S	T	U–V–W	X–Y–Z	

This is an alphabetical list of film articles (or sections within articles about films). It includes made for television films. See the talk page for the method of indexing used.

== G ==
- G: (2002 & 2004)
- G-Force (2009)
- G-Men from Hell (2000)
- G-SALE (2003)
- G.I. Blues (1960)
- G.I. Jane (1997)
- G.I. Joe: The Movie (1987)
- G.I. Joe: The Rise of Cobra (2009)
- G.I. Joe: Retaliation (2013)
- G.O.R.A. (2005)
- G@me (2003)
- G Men (1935)

=== Ga ===
==== Gaa–Gal ====
- Gaadi (2019)
- Gaai Aur Gori (1973)
- Gaali (1944)
- Gaali Gopura (1962)
- Gaali Maathu (1981)
- Gaali Medalu (1962)
- Gaali Sampath (2021)
- Gaalipata (2008)
- Gaalipata 2 (2022)
- Gaana Bajaana (2010)
- Gaanam (1982)
- Gaandharvam (1978)
- Gaane Ki Aane (2016)
- Gaatho (2016)
- Gaayam (1993)
- Gaayam 2 (2010)
- Gaayathri (1977)
- Gaayathridevi Ente Amma (1985)
- Gaban (1966)
- Gabbar Is Back (2015)
- Gabbar Singh (2012)
- Gabbeh (1997)
- Gabbia (2003)
- Gabby's Dollhouse: The Movie (2025)
- Gabi (2012)
- Gabriel: (1976 & 2007)
- Gabriel Over the White House (1933)
- Gabriel's Passion (2009)
- Gabrielle: (1954, 2005 & 2013)
- Gaby (1956)
- Gacaca, Living Together Again In Rwanda? (2002)
- Gachchi (2017)
- Gacy (2003)
- Gada Meilin (2002)
- Gaddar: The Traitor (2015)
- Gaga (2022)
- Gagak Item (1939)
- Gagamboy (2004)
- Gagarin's Grandson (2007)
- Gagetown (2009)
- Gai Shanxi and Her Sisters (2007)
- Gaia (2021)
- Gaiji Keisatsu (2012)
- Gaijin: Roads to Freedom (1980)
- Gaijin 2: Love Me as I Am (2005)
- Gail Daughtry and the Celebrity Sex Pass (2026)
- Gainsbourg: A Heroic Life (2010)
- Gair (1999)
- Gair Kanooni (1989)
- Gaja (2008)
- Gajaar: Journey of the Soul (2011)
- Gajab Thai Gayo! (2022)
- Gajakesari (2014)
- Gajakesariyogam (1990)
- Gajanana and Gang (2022)
- Gajapathi Garvabhanga (1989)
- Gaku: Minna no Yama (2011)
- Gal Basara: Sengoku Jidai wa Kengai Desu (2011)
- Gala (1982)
- Galactic Gigolo (1987)
- Galang (2022)
- Galapagos (1955)
- Galata (2014)
- Galaxina (1980)
- The Galaxy on Earth (2014)
- Galaxy Express 999 (1979)
- Galaxy of Horrors (2017)
- Galaxy Invader (1985)
- Galaxy Quest (1999)
- Galaxy of Stars (1936)
- Galaxy of Terror (1981)
- Galaxy Turnpike (2015)
- Gale: Yellow Brick Road (2026)
- The Gallant Hours (1960)
- Gallipoli: (1981 & 2005)
- The Galloping Major (1951)
- Galloping Thunder: (1927 & 1946)
- Galveston (2018)

==== Gam ====
- Gam Gam Ganesha (2024)
- Gaman (1978)
- Gamanam: (1994 & 2021)
- Gamani (2011)
- Gamba: Gamba to Nakama-tachi (2015)
- Gambia: Take Me to Learn My Roots (2019)
- Gambit: (1966, 2012 & unreleased)
- The Gamble: (1916, 1971 & 1988)
- Gambler (1971)
- The Gambler: (1919, 1938, 1958, 1974, 1995, 1997, 2013 & 2014)
- The Game: (1997 & 2010)
- Game 6 (2005)
- Game of Death (1978)
- Game of Death II (1981)
- Game Night (2018)
- Game Over: (2003 TV, 2013 & 2019)
- Game Over, Man! (2018)
- Game Over: Kasparov and the Machine (2003)
- The Game Plan (2007)
- The Game of Their Lives: (2002 & 2005)
- Gamer: (2009 & 2011)
- Gamera vs. Guiron (1969)
- Gamera vs. Gyaos (1967)
- Gamera vs. Zigra (1971)
- Gamera: Guardian of the Universe (1995)
- Gamera 2: Attack of Legion (1996)
- Gamera 3: The Revenge of Iris (1999)
- Gamers (2006)
- The Gamers (2002)
- Gamma Rays (2023)
- Gamyam (2008)

==== Gan ====
- Gana (2025)
- Ganadevata (1978)
- Ganagandharvan (2019)
- Ganam Courtar Avargale (1988)
- Ganamela (1991)
- Ganapathy Vanthachi (2006)
- Ganbare! Gian!! (2001)
- Gandahar (1987)
- Ganavim Ba Hok (2010)
- A Gander at Mother Goose (1940)
- Gandhi (1982)
- The Gandhi Murder (2019)
- Gandhi, My Father (2007)
- The Gang (2000)
- Gang in Blue (1996)
- The Gang Buster (1931)
- The Gang of Eight (1962)
- The Gang of Oss (2011)
- Gang Related (1997)
- The Gang Show (1937)
- A Gang Story (2011)
- The Gang That Couldn't Shoot Straight (1971)
- The Gang That Sold America (1979)
- The Gang's All Here: (1939, 1941 & 1943)
- Gangaajal (2003)
- Gangs of New York (2002)
- Gangs of Wasseypur (2012)
- The Gangster: (1947, 1965 & 2012)
- Gangster No. 1 (2000)
- Gangster Payday (2014)
- Gangster Squad (2013)
- The Gangster, the Cop, the Devil (2019)
- A Gangstergirl (1966)
- The Gangsters (1913)
- Ganja and Hess (1973)
- Gantz: O (2016)
- Ganvesh (2016)
- Ganwaar (1970)

==== Gao–Gaz ====
- Gaon (2018)
- Gaon Hamara Shaher Tumhara (1972)
- Gaon Ki Gori (1945)
- Gaon Tasa Changla Pan Veshila Tangla (1985)
- Gaon Thor Pudhari Chor (2017)
- Gapa Hele Bi Sata: (1976 & 2015)
- Gappa: The Triphibian Monster (1967)
- Garage Days (2002)
- Garagouz (2010)
- Garakowa: Restore the World (2016)
- Garbo (1992)
- Garden of Eden (1954)
- The Garden of Eden: (1928, 1984, 1998 & 2008)
- The Garden of Evening Mists (2019)
- Garden of Evil (1954)
- The Garden of the Finzi-Continis (1970)
- Garden of Heaven (2003)
- Garden Party: (2008 & 2017)
- Garden State (2004)
- The Garden of Words (2013)
- The Gardener: (1912, 1974, 1987 & 2012)
- Gardens of Stone (1987)
- The Garfield Movie (2024)
- Garfield: The Movie (2004)
- Garfield: A Tale of Two Kitties (2006)
- Garm Wars: The Last Druid (2014)
- The Garment Jungle (1957)
- Garōden (1995)
- Gas Food Lodging (1992)
- Gas! (1971)
- Gaslight: (1940 & 1944)
- Gasoline (2001)
- A Gasoline Wedding (1918)
- The Gate: (1987 & 2014)
- The Gate II: Trespassers (1990)
- Gate of Flesh (1964)
- The Gate of Heavenly Peace (1995)
- Gate of Hell (1953)
- Gates of Heaven (1980)
- The Gathering: (1977 TV & 2002)
- A Gathering of Eagles (1963)
- A Gathering of Old Men (1987) (TV)
- Gator (1976)
- Gattaca (1997)
- The Gauntlet (1977)
- Gawain and the Green Knight (1973)
- Gay Blades (1946)
- Gay Days (2009)
- The Gay Deceiver (1926)
- The Gay Deceivers (1969)
- Gay and Devilish (1922)
- The Gay Divorcee (1934)
- The Gay Falcon (1941)
- Gay Meets Girl (2013)
- Gay Purr-ee (1962)
- Gay Sex in the 70s (2005)
- Gay USA (1977)
- Gayathri (1973)
- Gayathri (1977)
- Gayathri Maduve (1983)
- Gayatri (2018)
- Gayatri Mahima (1977)
- Gayby (2012)
- Gaydar (2002)
- Gaza (2019)
- Gaza: Doctors Under Attack (2025) (TV)
- Gaza: How to Survive a Warzone (2025) (TV)
- Gaza mon amour (2020)
- Gaza: Still Alive (2019) (TV)
- Gaza Strip (2002)
- A Gaza Weekend (2022)
- Gazal (1964)
- Gazelle (2025)
- Gazalles (2014)
- Gazer (2024)
- Gazzara (2012)

=== Ge ===
==== Gea–Gem ====
- Geared to Go (1924)
- Gebo and the Shadow (2012)
- Gedda Maga (1983)
- Gee Whiz-z-z-z-z-z-z (1956)
- Geechee (unreleased)
- Geeft ons kracht (1920)
- Geek Charming (2011)
- Geek Maggot Bingo (1983)
- Geeks (2004)
- Geet: (1944, 1970, 1992 & 2007)
- Geet Gaata Chal (1975)
- Geet Gaya Patharon Ne (1964)
- Geeta (1940)
- Geetaa Mera Naam (1974)
- Geetanjali (1993)
- Geetha: (1981 & 2019)
- Geetha Bangle Store (2015)
- Geetha Gandhi (1949)
- Geetha Govindam (2018)
- Geethaanjali (2013)
- Geethaiyin Raadhai (2016)
- Geetham (1986)
- Geethanjali: (1985, 1989 & 2014)
- Geethanjali Malli Vachindi (2024)
- Geez & Ann (2021)
- GeGeGe no Nyōbō (2010)
- Geharha: The Dark and Long Haired Monster (2009 TV)
- Gehenna (1938)
- Gehenna: Where Death Lives (2016)
- Gehra Daag (1963)
- Gehra Zakhm (1981)
- Gehraiyaan (2022)
- Gehrayee (1980)
- Gehri Chaal (1973)
- A Geisha (1953)
- The Geisha: (1914 & 1983)
- The Geisha Boy (1958)
- Geisha Girl (1952)
- The Geisha and the Samurai (1919)
- Gejagt bis zum Morgen (1957)
- Gejje Naada (1993)
- Gejje Pooje (1969)
- Gekijōban Dōbutsu no Mori (2006)
- Gekijōban Meiji Tokyo Renka: Hana Kagami no Fantasia (2016)
- Gekijōban Meiji Tokyo Renka: Yumihari no Serenade (2015)
- Gekijōban Shiritsu Bakaleya Kōkō (2012)
- Gekijōban Zero (2014)
- Gekkō no Kamen (2012)
- Gelo (2016)
- Gelosia (1915)
- Gemeni (2002)
- Gemini: (1999, 2002 & 2017)
- Gemini Man (2019)
- Gemini Rising (2013)
- Gemma Bovery (2014)

==== Gen ====
- Gen: (2006 & 2025)
- Gen13 (1998)
- Gen-X Cops (1999)
- Gen-Y Cops (2000)
- The Gene Generation (2006)
- Gene-X (2006)
- Genealogies of a Crime (1997)
- The General: (1926, 1992 & 1998)
- General della Rovere (1959)
- The General Died at Dawn (1936)
- General Idi Amin Dada: A Self Portrait (1974)
- The General Line (1929)
- General Spanky (1936)
- The General's Daughter (1999)
- A Generation (1955)
- Generation X (1996) (TV)
- Genesis: (1986, 1999, 2018 Canadian & 2018 Hungarian)
- Genesis: The Creation and the Flood (1994) (TV)
- Genevieve (1953)
- Genghis Blues (1999)
- Genghis Khan: (1950, 1965, 1998 & 2018)
- Genghis Khan: To the Ends of the Earth and Sea (2007)
- A Genius, Two Partners and a Dupe (1975)
- Genova (1953)
- Genova (2008)
- The Gentle Art of Burglary (1916)
- A Gentle Creature (2017)
- The Gentle Rain (1966)
- A Gentle Woman (1969)
- Gentleman: (1989, 1993 & 2016)
- The Gentleman (1994)
- Gentleman Jim (1942)
- Gentleman's Agreement (1947)
- Gentlemen (2014)
- The Gentlemen: (1965 & 2019)
- Gentlemen Broncos (2009)
- Gentlemen of Fortune (1971)
- Gentlemen Marry Brunettes (1955)
- Gentlemen Prefer Blondes: (1928 & 1953)
- Genuine (1920)

==== Geo–Gep ====
- Geo Sar Utha Kay (2017)
- The Geographer Drank His Globe Away (2013)
- Geographies of Solitude (2022)
- Geography Club (2013)
- Geometria (1987)
- Geordie (1955)
- Georg (2007)
- George and A.J. (2009)
- George and the Dragon (2004)
- George and Georgette (1934)
- George Harrison: Living in the Material World (2011)
- George the Hedgehog (2011)
- George of the Jungle (1997)
- George of the Jungle 2 (2003)
- George Lopez Why You Crying? (2004)
- George Lucas in Love (1999)
- George and Margaret (1940)
- The George McKenna Story (1986 TV)
- George and Mildred (1980)
- The George Raft Story (1961)
- George and Rosemary (1987)
- George Wallace (1997) (TV)
- George Washington (2000)
- George Washington Slept Here (1942)
- George White's 1935 Scandals (1935)
- George's Island (1989)
- Georgetown (2019)
- Georgia: (1988 & 1995)
- The Georgia Peaches (1980 TV)
- Georgia Rule (2007)
- Georgica (1998)
- Georgy Girl (1966)
- Geostorm (2017)
- Geppetto (2000) (TV)
- Geppo il folle (1978)

==== Ger–Ges ====
- Gerak Khas The Movie (2001)
- Gerald (2010)
- Gerald Cranston's Lady (1924)
- Gerald McBoing-Boing (1951)
- Gerald's Game (2017)
- Geraldine: (1929, 1953 & 2000)
- Geraldine's First Year (1922)
- Geraldine's Fortune (2004)
- Geran (2019)
- Gerda (2021)
- Geri's Game (1997)
- Germ (2010)
- German Hearts on the German Rhine (1926)
- Germany 09: 13 Short Films About the State of the Nation (2009)
- Germany in Autumn (1978)
- Germany Pale Mother (1980)
- Germany Year 90 Nine Zero (1991)
- Germany, Year Zero (1948)
- Germinal: (1913, 1963 & 1993)
- Geronimo: (1939, 1962, 1993 TV & 2014)
- Geronimo: An American Legend (1993)
- Geronimo's Last Raid (1912)
- Gerrie & Louise (1997)
- Gerry: (2002 & 2011)
- Gerrymandering (2010)
- Gert and Daisy Clean Up (1942)
- Gertie the Dinosaur (1914)
- Gertrud (1964)
- Gervaise (1956)
- Gesetze der Liebe (1927)
- Gestapo's Last Orgy (1977)
- Gestern und heute (1938)
- Gestoorde hengelaar (1896)
- Gesualdo: Death for Five Voices (1995 TV)

==== Get–Gey ====
- Get Away (2024)
- Get Away, Get Away (1993)
- Get Away If You Can (2022)
- Get Back (1991)
- Get Big (2017)
- Get Bruce (1999)
- Get on the Bus (1996)
- Get Carter: (1971 & 2000)
- Get Christie Love! (1974) (TV)
- Get a Clue (2002) (TV)
- Get Cracking (1943)
- Get Crazy (1983)
- Get Duked! (2019)
- Get 'Em Young (1926)
- Get Going (1943)
- Get Gone (2019)
- Get the Gringo (2012)
- Get Hard (2015)
- Get Hep to Love (1942)
- Get Her... If You Can (2019)
- Get Him Girl! (2021)
- Get Him to the Greek (2010)
- Get In (2009)
- Get Low (2009)
- Get Lucky (2013)
- Get Married (2007)
- Get Married 2 (2009)
- Get Married 3 (2011)
- Get Me Roger Stone (2017)
- Get Mean (1975)
- Get My Son Dead or Alive (1982)
- Get Off My Foot (1935)
- Get On Up (2014)
- Get Out (2017)
- The Get Out (2026)
- Get Out Alive (2013)
- Get Out and Get Under (1920)
- Get Out of My Room (1985)
- Get Out Your Handkerchiefs (1978)
- Get Outta Town (1960)
- Get Over It (2001)
- Get Ready to Be Boyzvoiced (2000)
- Get Real (1998)
- Get Rich or Die Tryin' (2005)
- Get Rollin' (1980)
- Get Santa (2014)
- Get Shorty (1995)
- Get Smart (2008)
- Get Smart, Again! (1989 TV)
- Get Smart's Bruce and Lloyd: Out of Control (2008)
- Get Squirrely (2016)
- Get Up! (2003)
- Get-Rich-Quick Wallingford: (1916 & 1921)
- Get-Set Baby (2025)
- Getaway (2013)
- The Getaway: (1972 & 1994)
- Gettin' Square (2003)
- Getting Any? (1995)
- Getting Away with Murder (1996)
- Getting Away with Murder: The JonBenet Ramsey Story (2000)
- Getting Even with Dad (1994)
- Getting Home (2007)
- Getting In (1994)
- Getting Lucky (1999)
- Getting My Brother Laid (2001)
- Getting There (2002)
- The Getting of Wisdom (1977)
- Gettysburg: (1993 & 2011 TV)
- Geulimja (1935)
- Geumbungeo (1927)
- Geylang (2022)

=== Gg ===
- GG Bond series:
  - GG Bond Hatching (2012)
  - GG Bond 2 (2014)
  - GG Bond: Ultimate Battle (2015)
  - GG Bond: Guarding (2017)
  - GG Bond: Lollipop in Fantasy (2019)
  - GG Bond: Diary of Dinosaur (2021)
  - GG Bond: Ocean Mission (2022)
  - GG Bond: Racing 72H (2023)
  - GG Bond: Interstellar Mission (2024)
  - GG Bond: Race Through Time (2026)

=== Gh ===
==== Gha–Ghi ====
- Ghaath: (2000 & 2023)
- Ghaati (2025)
- Ghaav: The Wound (2002)
- Ghaazee Bandaarain (1982)
- Ghabrana Nahi Hai (2022)
- Ghadi (2013)
- Ghajini: (2005 & 2008)
- Ghalib (1961)
- Ghana Must Go (2016)
- Ghanchakkar (2013)
- Ghani: (2006 & 2021)
- Ghar (1978)
- Ghar Banduk Biryani (2023)
- Ghar Basake Dekho (1963)
- Ghar Ek Mandir (1984)
- Ghar Ghar Ki Kahani: (1970 & 1988)
- Ghar Ho To Aisa (1990)
- Ghar Jamai (1992)
- Ghare Baire (1984)
- Gharsallah, la semence de Dieu (2007)
- Ghetto (1997)
- Ghetto Freaks (1970)
- Ghetto Stories (2010)
- Ghidorah, the Three-Headed Monster (1965)
- Ghilli (2004)

==== Gho–Ghu ====
- Gholamreza Takhti (2019)
- Ghoom (2006)
- Ghore Pherar Gaan (2023)
- Ghost: (1990, 1998, 2012, 2015, 2019 & 2020)
- The Ghost: (1963, 1982, 2004, 2008 & 2010)
- Ghost Bird (2009)
- A Ghost and the Boy with a Box on His Head (2017)
- The Ghost Breakers (1940)
- Ghost Brigade (1993)
- Ghost Cat (2003) (TV)
- Ghost Cat of Yonaki Swamp (1957)
- Ghost Catchers (1944)
- Ghost Child (2013)
- Ghost Dad (1990)
- The Ghost and the Darkness (1996)
- Ghost Day (2012)
- Ghost Diver (1957)
- Ghost Dog: The Way of the Samurai (1999)
- Ghost Fever (1987)
- The Ghost of Frankenstein (1942)
- The Ghost Galleon (1974)
- Ghost Game (2004)
- The Ghost Goes West (1935)
- Ghost Graduation (2012)
- Ghost House: (2004 & 2017)
- The Ghost Hunt (1918)
- Ghost Hunting (2017)
- The Ghost Inside (2005)
- The Ghost in the Invisible Bikini (1966)
- Ghost Lab (2021)
- Ghost Light (2018)
- Ghost in Love (1998)
- Ghost in the Machine (1993)
- The Ghost and Mr. Chicken (1966)
- The Ghost and Mrs. Muir (1947)
- Ghost in the Noonday Sun (1974)
- Ghost Rider: (1982 & 2007)
- The Ghost Rider: (1935 & 1943)
- Ghost Rider: Spirit of Vengeance (2011)
- Ghost of Saga Mansion (1953)
- Ghost in the Shell: (1995 & 2017)
- Ghost in the Shell 2: Innocence (2004)
- The Ghost Ship (1944)
- Ghost Ship: (1952 & 2002)
- The Ghost of Sierra de Cobre (1964) (TV)
- Ghost Soldier (2026)
- Ghost Station (2007)
- Ghost Story: (1974 & 1981)
- A Ghost Story (2017)
- Ghost Town (2008)
- Ghost Train: (1927 & 2006)
- The Ghost Train: (1931 & 1941)
- Ghost Train International (1976)
- Ghost Tropic (2019)
- Ghost Valley (1932)
- Ghost Valley Raiders (1940)
- The Ghost Valley's Treasure Mysteries (1974)
- A Ghost Waits (2020)
- Ghost World (2001)
- The Ghost Writer (2010)
- Ghost: Mouichido Dakishimetai (2010)
- Ghostbusters series:
  - Ghostbusters: (1984 & 2016)
  - Ghostbusters II (1989)
  - Ghostbusters: Afterlife (2021)
  - Ghostbusters: Frozen Empire (2024)
- Ghostheads (2016)
- Ghosthouse (1988)
- Ghosthunters (2016)
- Ghosthunters: On Icy Trails (2015)
- Ghosting: The Spirit of Christmas (2019)
- Ghostkeeper (1981)
- Ghostland (2018)
- Ghostlight (2024)
- Ghostline (2015)
- Ghostquake (2012) (TV)
- Ghosts: (1915, 2005, 2006 & 2014)
- Ghosts of the Abyss (2003)
- Ghosts Before Breakfast (1928)
- The Ghosts of Buxley Hall (1980) (TV)
- Ghosts Can't Do It (1990)
- Ghosts of Chosun (1970)
- Ghosts of Girlfriends Past (2009)
- Ghosts of Mars (2001)
- Ghosts of Mississippi (1996)
- Ghosts of Our Forest (2017)
- Ghosts of Rome (1961)
- Ghosts of War (2020)
- Ghosts… of the Civil Dead (1988)
- Ghostwatch (1992) (TV)
- Ghoulies series:
  - Ghoulies (1985)
  - Ghoulies 2 (1987)
  - Ghoulies III: Ghoulies Go To College (1991)
  - Ghoulies IV (1994)
- Ghroob Wa Shrooq (1970)
- Ghudchadi (2024)
- Ghuddi (1980)
- Ghulam (1998)
- Ghulami: (1985 Hindi & 1985 Punjabi)
- Ghund Kadh Le Ni Sohreyan Da Pind Aa Gaya (2022)
- Ghunda Raj (1994)
- Ghundi Run (2007)
- Ghunghat: (1960, 1962 & 1996)
- Ghungroo Ki Awaaz (1981)
- Ghutan (2007)

=== Gi ===
==== Gia–Gim ====
- Gia (1998)
- Gia mia choufta Touristries (1971)
- Gia mia houfta touvla (1987)
- Giacomo Casanova: Childhood and Adolescence (1969)
- Giacomo the Idealist (1943)
- Giallo: (1933 & 2009)
- Giallo a Venezia (1979)
- Giant: (1956, 2009, 2017 & 2025)
- Giant Bear (2019)
- The Giant Claw (1957)
- Giant of the Evil Island (1965)
- Giant God Warrior Appears in Tokyo (2012)
- Giant Little Ones (2018)
- The Giant of Marathon (1959)
- Giant Mine (1992 TV)
- The Giant Spider Invasion (1975)
- Giant from the Unknown (1957)
- Giant's Kettle (2023)
- Giants of Africa (2016)
- Giants Being Lonely (2019)
- Giants of Rome (1964)
- Giants and Toys (1958)
- Giants vs. Yanks (1922)
- Giarabub (1942)
- Gib Gas – Ich will Spass (1983)
- Gibraltar: (1938 & 1964)
- Giddap! (1925)
- Giddh (1984)
- Giddha (1983)
- Gideon (1998)
- Gideon and Samson: Great Leaders of the Bible (1965)
- Gideon's Army (2013)
- Gideon's Day (1958)
- Gideon's Trumpet (1980) (TV)
- Gidget (1959)
- Gidget Gets Married (1972 TV)
- Gidget Goes Hawaiian (1961)
- Gidget Goes to Rome (1963)
- Gidget Grows Up (1969 TV)
- Gie (2005)
- Gierek (2022)
- Gift: (1966 & 1993)
- The Gift: (1979 TV, 1994 TV, 2000, 2003, 2014, 2015 American & 2015 Scottish)
- A Gift from Bob (2020)
- Gift of Gab (1934)
- Gift from the Heart (2014)
- Gift Horse (1952)
- Gift Wrapped (1952)
- Gifted Hands: The Ben Carson Story (2009 TV)
- Gigantic (2009)
- Gigantic (A Tale of Two Johns) (2002)
- Gigi: (1949 & 1958)
- Gigli (2003)
- Gigolo (1926)
- The Gigolo: (1960 & 2015)
- The Gigolo 2 (2016)
- The Gigolos (2005)
- Gigot (1962)
- Gilaneh (2004)
- Gilbert Dying to Die (1915)
- Gilbert Gets Tiger-It is (1915)
- Gilda (1946)
- Gilded Lies (1921)
- The Gilded Lily: (1921 & 1935)
- Gildersleeve on Broadway (1942)
- Gildersleeve's Bad Day (1943)
- Gildersleeve's Ghost (1944)
- Giliap (1975)
- Gilles (2008)
- Gilles' Wife (2004)
- Gilly in Prague for the First Time (1920)
- Gimme (1923)
- Gimme Danger (2016)
- Gimme the Loot (2012)
- Gimme the Power (2000)
- Gimme the Power (2012)
- Gimme Shelter (1970)
- Gimme Shelter (2013)
- Gimme an 'F' (1984)
- Gimmick (2019)
- Gims: On the Record (2020)

==== Gin–Gir ====
- Ginger and Fred (1986)
- Ginger Mick (1920)
- Ginger in the Morning (1974)
- Ginger Snaps series:
  - Ginger Snaps (2000)
  - Ginger Snaps 2: Unleashed (2004)
  - Ginger Snaps Back: The Beginning (2004)
- The Gingerbread Man (1998)
- Gingerclown (2013)
- The Gingerdead Man (2005)
- Gingerdead Man 2: Passion of the Crust (2008)
- Gingerdead Man 3: Saturday Night Cleaver (2011)
- Gingerdead Man vs. Evil Bong (2013)
- Gintama series:
  - Gintama: The Movie (2010)
  - Gintama: The Movie: The Final Chapter: Be Forever Yorozuya (2013)
  - Gintama (2017)
  - Gintama 2: Rules are Made to be Broken (2018)
  - Gintama: The Very Final (2021)
- Giovanni Falcone (1993)
- Giovanni's Island (2014)
- Gipsy Blood (1911)
- Giran (2009)
- The Girl: (1987, 2000, 2012 TV & 2014)
- Girl 6 (1996)
- Girl Asleep (2015)
- The Girl in the Bathtub (2018)
- Girl on a Bicycle (2013)
- Girl on the Bridge (1999)
- The Girl Can't Help It (1956)
- Girl Crazy: (1932 & 1943)
- A Girl and a Dolphin (1979)
- The Girl with the Dragon Tattoo: (2009 & 2011)
- A Girl in Every Port: (1928 & 1952)
- Girl Friends (1936)
- Girl in Gold Boots (1969)
- The Girl of the Golden West: (1915, 1922, 1923, 1930 & 1938)
- Girl Happy (1965)
- A Girl from Hunan (1986)
- Girl Lost (2016)
- The Girl from Monday (2005)
- Girl Most Likely (2012)
- The Girl on a Motorcycle (1968)
- The Girl Next Door: (2004 & 2007)
- The Girl in the Park (2007)
- Girl with a Pearl Earring (2003)
- Girl Picture (2022)
- Girl in the Picture (2022)
- The Girl in the Picture: (1957 & 1985)
- Girl from Rio: (1939 & 2001)
- The Girl from Rio: (1927 & 1969)
- The Girl in Room 20 (1949)
- The Girl in Room 2A (1974)
- Girl Shy (1924)
- The Girl and the Spider (2021)
- The Girl in the Spider's Web (2018)
- Girl Stroke Boy (1971)
- The Girl in the Taxi: (1921 & 1937)
- Girl on the Third Floor (2019)
- The Girl on the Train: (2013 & 2016)
- A Girl Walks Home Alone at Night (2014)
- The Girl Who Believes in Miracles (2021)
- The Girl Who Kicked the Hornets' Nest (2009)
- The Girl Who Knew Too Much (1969)
- The Girl Who Leapt Through Time (2006)
- The Girl Who Played with Fire (2009)
- Girl, Interrupted (1999)
- Girl, Positive (2007) (TV)
- Girlfight (2000)
- Girlfriend: (2004, 2010 & 2018)
- The Girlfriend Experience (2009)
- Girlfriend From Hell (1989)
- Girlfriends: (1978, 2006 & 2009)
- Girlfriend's Day (2017)
- Les Girls (1957)
- The Girls: (1961 & 1968)
- Girls Just Want to Have Fun (1985)
- Girls Like Girls (2026)
- Girls Lost (2015)
- Girls Nite Out (1982)
- The Girls of Pleasure Island (1953)
- Girls of the Sun (2018)
- Girls Town: (1959 & 1996)
- Girls Trip (2017)
- Girls und Panzer der Film (2015)
- Girls Will Be Girls (2003)
- Girls! Girls! Girls! (1962)
- Girls' Night Out (1998)
- Girls' School: (1938 & 1950)
- Girls' Town (1942)

==== Gis–Giz ====
- Giselle (2013)
- Gising Na ang Higanteng Natutulog (1995)
- Gising Na si Adan (2002)
- Git Along Little Dogies (1937)
- Gitmo: The New Rules of War (2005)
- Gito, l'ingrat (1992)
- Gitta Discovers Her Heart (1932)
- Giulia Doesn't Date at Night (2009)
- Giuseppe Makes a Movie (2014)
- Giuseppe Verdi (1938)
- Giuseppe Verdi's Rigoletto Story (2005)
- Giv Gud en chance om søndagen (1970)
- Give the Devil His Due (1985)
- Give 'Em Hell, Malone (2009)
- Give a Girl a Break (1953)
- Give 'em Hell, Harry! (1975)
- Give Her a Ring (1934)
- Give It All (1998)
- Give Love (2009)
- Give a Man a Job (1933)
- Give Me an A (2022)
- Give Me a Book of Complaints (1965)
- Give Me Liberty: (1936 & 2019)
- Give Me Life (1928)
- Give Me Moonlight (2001)
- Give Me My Chance (1957)
- Give Me Pity! (2022)
- Give My Regards to the Blonde Child on the Rhine (1926)
- Give My Regards to Broad Street (1984)
- Give My Regards to Broadway (1948)
- Give Me a Sailor (1938)
- Give Me the Stars (1945)
- Give and Take (1928)
- Give or Take (2020)
- Give Me Ten Desperate Men (1962)
- Give Me Your Hand (2008)
- Give Me Your Heart (1936)
- Give Out, Sisters (1942)
- Give a Paw, Friend! (1967)
- Give Seven Days (2014)
- Give Them Wings (2021)
- Give Us the Money (2012)
- Give Us the Moon (1944)
- Give Us Our Skeletons (1999)
- Give Us This Day: (1943 & 1949)
- Give Us This Night (1936)
- Give Us Tomorrow (1978)
- Given the Movie: (2020 & 2024)
- The Giver (2014)
- Giving Becky a Chance (1917)
- Giving Birth to a Butterfly (2021)
- Giving Them Fits (1915)
- Giving Voice (2020)
- Gizmo! (1977)

=== Gj ===
- Gjest Baardsen (1939)

=== Gl–Gn ===
- Glad Rag Doll (1929)
- Glad Tidings (1953)
- The Gladiator: (1938 & 1986)
- Gladiator: (1992 & 2000)
- Gladiator II (2024)
- The Gladiators (1969)
- Gladiators of Rome (2012)
- Gladiola (1915)
- Glago's Guest (2008)
- Glamorous Night (1937)
- Glamour Boy (1941)
- Glass: (1958 & 2019)
- The Glass Bottom Boat (1966)
- The Glass Castle: (1950 & 2017)
- The Glass House: (1972, 2001 & 2009)
- Glass House: The Good Mother (2006)
- Glass Houses: (1922 & 1972)
- The Glass Key (1935 & 1942)
- The Glass Menagerie: (1950, 1966 TV, 1973 TV & 1987)
- Glass Onion: A Knives Out Mystery (2022)
- The Glass Slipper (1955)
- The Glass Web (1953)
- Glasshouse (2021)
- Glassland (2014)
- Glastonbury (2006)
- Glastonbury Fayre (1972)
- Gleaming the Cube (1989)
- The Gleaners and I (2000)
- Glee: The 3D Concert Movie (2011)
- Gleich (2023)
- Glen Campbell: I'll Be Me (2014)
- Glen or Glenda (1953)
- Glengarry Glen Ross (1992)
- The Glenn Miller Story (1954)
- The Glimmer Man (1996)
- A Glimpse Inside the Mind of Charles Swan III (2013)
- A Glitch in the Matrix (2021)
- Glitter (2001)
- A Global Affair (1964)
- Gloomy Sunday (1999)
- Gloria: (1980, 1999 American, 1999 Portuguese, 2013 & 2014)
- Glorifying the American Girl (1929)
- Glorious 39 (2009)
- Glorious Betsy (1928)
- Glory: (1956, 1989 & 2016)
- Glory Road (2006)
- Glow of the Firefly (2014)
- Glue (2006)
- Glue Sniffer (1999)
- Glumov's Diary (1923)
- Gnanambika (1940)
- Gnome Alone (2017)
- A Gnome Named Gnorm (1990)
- The Gnome-Mobile (1967)
- Gnomeo & Juliet (2011)
- Gnomes: (1980 TV & 2022)
- Gnomes and Trolls: The Secret Chamber (2008)
- The Gnomes' Great Adventure (1987)

=== Go ===
- Go: (1999, 2001 & 2007)
- Go Away (2023)
- Go Away from Me (2006)
- Go Back to China (2019)
- Go Chase Yourself (1938)
- Go Down, Death! (1944)
- Go Figure (2005 TV)
- Go Fish (1994)
- Go for Broke! (1951)
- Go Further (2003)
- Go Gorilla Go (1975)
- Go Karts (2019)
- Go Lala Go! (2010)
- Go Lala Go 2 (2015)
- Go Man Go (1954)
- Go Naked in the World (1961)
- Go North (2017)
- Go Now (1995)
- Go Tell It on the Mountain (1985 TV)
- Go Tell the Spartans (1978)
- Go West: (1925, 1940 & 2005)
- The Go-Between: (1971 & 2015 TV)
- The Go-Go's (2020)

==== Goa–Gob ====
- Goa: (2010 & 2015)
- Goa Dalli CID 999 (1968)
- Goal: (1936, 2007 Hindi, 2007 Malayalam & 2018)
- The Goal (1999)
- The Goal (2023)
- Goal! series:
  - Goal! The Dream Begins (2005)
  - Goal! 2: Living the Dream... (2007)
  - Goal III: Taking on the World (2009)
- Goal! Another Goal! (1968)
- Goal of the Dead (2014)
- Goalie (2019)
- The Goalkeeper (1936)
- The Goalkeeper (2000)
- The Goalkeeper (2018)
- The Goalkeeper's Fear of the Penalty (1972)
- Goat: (2015, 2016 & 2026)
- The Goat (1917)
- The Goat (1918)
- The Goat (1921)
- A Goat in the Garden (1958)
- Goat Getter (1925)
- Goat Girl (2025)
- The Goat Horn (1972)
- The Goat Life (2024)
- Goat Story (2008)
- Goat Story 2 (2012)
- A Goat's Tail (2006)
- Goats (2012)
- The Goats of Monesiglio (2022)
- Goaway and Twobriefcases (1974)
- Goblin (2010 TV)
- Gobs and Gals (1952)
- Gobseck (1924)

==== God ====
- God on the Balcony (2020)
- God Bless America (2011)
- God Bless the Broken Road (2018)
- God Bless the Child (1988)
- God Bless You (1948)
- The God Boy (1976) (TV)
- God Calling (2018)
- The God of Clay (2011)
- The God Committee (2021)
- The God of Cookery (1996)
- God & Country (2024)
- God Created Them (1953)
- God Didn't Give Me a Week's Notice (2001)
- God Exists, Her Name Is Petrunija (2019)
- God Father (2016)
- God Father (2020)
- God Forbid a Worse Thing Should Happen (2002)
- God Forgives... I Don't! (1967)
- God of Gamblers (1989)
- God of Gamblers II (1990)
- God of Gamblers III: Back to Shanghai (1991)
- God of Gamblers Returns (1994)
- God of Gamblers 3: The Early Stage (1996)
- The God in the Garden (1921)
- God Gave Me Twenty Cents (1926)
- God Grew Tired of Us (2006)
- God and Gun (1995)
- God of Happiness (2015)
- God in Heaven... Arizona on Earth (1972)
- God Help the Girl (2014)
- God Help Me (2006)
- God Is American (2007)
- God Is the Bigger Elvis (2012)
- God Is Brazilian (2003)
- God Is a Bullet (2023)
- God Is Great and I'm Not (2001)
- God Is My Co-Pilot (1945)
- God Is My Colt .45 (1972)
- God Is My Partner (1957)
- God Is a Woman (2023)
- The God King (1974)
- God Knows Where I Am (2016)
- God of Love (2010)
- God Loves Caviar (2012)
- God Loves Uganda (2013)
- God Made Them... I Kill Them (1968)
- God and the Man (1918)
- God, Man and Devil (Got, mentsh un tayvl) (1950)
- God Man Dog (2007)
- God on My Side (2006)
- God Needs Men (1950)
- God Only Knows (2019)
- The God of Ramen (2013)
- God Reward You (1948)
- God Rides a Harley (1987)
- God Rot Tunbridge Wells! (1985) (TV)
- God Said Ha! (1998)
- God for Sale (2013)
- God Say (2017)
- God, Sex & Apple Pie (1998)
- God, Sex and Truth (2018)
- God Sleeps in Rwanda (2005)
- God Speed You! Black Emperor (1976)
- God Told Me To (1976)
- God Tussi Great Ho (2008)
- God, the Universe and Everything Else (1988)
- God Vulture and Human (2023)
- God of War (2017)
- God of War (2025)
- The God Who Wasn't There (2005)
- The God of Wealth (2020)
- God Went Surfing with the Devil (2010)
- God Will Forgive (2021)
- God Will Not Help (2025)
- God Willing (2006)
- God Willing (2015)
- The God Within (1912)
- God's Angry Man (1980 TV)
- God's Army (2000)
- God's Clay (1918)
- God's Clay (1928)
- God's Comedy (1995)
- God's Country (1946)
- God's Country (1985)
- God's Country (2011)
- God's Country (2022)
- God's Country and the Law (1921)
- God's Country and the Man (1931)
- God's Country and the Man (1937)
- God's Country and the Woman (1937)
- God's Creatures (2022)
- God's Crooked Lines (2022)
- God's Crucible (1917)
- God's Crucible (1921)
- God's Doorkeeper: St. André of Montreal (2010 TV)
- God's Faithful Servant: Barla (2011)
- God's Gift (2006)
- God's Gift to Women (1931)
- God's Good Man (1919)
- God's Great Wilderness (1927)
- God's Gun (1976)
- God's Inn by the Sea (1911)
- God's Lake Narrows (2011)
- God's Law and Man's (1917)
- God's Left Hand, Devil's Right Hand (2006)
- God's Little Acre (1958)
- God's Man (1917)
- God's Money (1959)
- God's Neighbors (2012)
- God's Nightmares (2019)
- God's Not Dead series:
  - God's Not Dead (2014)
  - God's Not Dead 2 (2016)
  - God's Not Dead: A Light in Darkness (2018)
  - God's Not Dead: We the People (2021)
  - God's Not Dead: In God We Trust (2024)
- God's Outlaw (1919)
- God's Outlaw (1986)
- God's Own Country (2014)
- God's Own Country (2017)
- God's Pocket (2014)
- God's Puzzle (2008)
- God's Sentence (unreleased)
- God's Smile or The Odessa Story (2008)
- God's Step Children (1938)
- God's Thunder (1965)
- God's Time (2023)
- God's Will Be Done (1936)
- Godavari (2006)
- Godavari (2021)
- Godbeast Megazord: Return of Green Dragon (2016)
- Goddamned Asura (2021)
- Godday Godday Chaa (2023)
- Goddess (2013)
- The Goddess (1934)
- The Goddess (1958)
- The Goddess of 1967 (2002)
- The Goddess Bunny (1994)
- Goddess of the Fireflies (2020)
- The Goddess of Fortune (2019)
- Goddess: How I fell in Love (2004)
- The Goddess of Lost Lake (1918)
- Goddess of Love (1988) (TV)
- The Goddess of Love (1957)
- Goddess Remembered (1989)
- The Goddess of Rio Beni (1950)
- The Goddess of Sagebrush Gulch (1912)
- Goddess of Slide (20240
- The Goddess of Spring (1934)
- Godfather (1991)
- Godfather (2007)
- Godfather (2012)
- Godfather (2022)
- The Godfather series:
  - The Godfather (1972)
  - The Godfather Part II (1974)
  - The Godfather Part III (1990)
- The Godfather of Green Bay (2005)
- Godfather Mendoza (1934)
- The Godfather's Daughter Mafia Blues (1991)
- Godforsaken (2003)
- Godha (2017)
- Godhi Banna Sadharana Mykattu (2016)
- Godland (2022)
- Godless: The Eastfield Exorcism (2023)
- The Godless Girl (1928)
- Godless Men (1920)
- The Godman (1999)
- Godmonster of Indian Flats (1973)
- Godmother (1999)
- Godmothered (2020)
- The Godmothers (1973)
- The Godparents (1973)
- Gods (2014)
- Gods Behaving Badly (2013)
- Gods of Egypt (2016)
- Gods and Generals (2003)
- Gods of Metal (1982)
- Gods and Monsters (1998)
- The Gods Must Be Crazy (1980)
- The Gods Must Be Crazy II (1989)
- Gods of the Plague (1970)
- Gods of Youth (2000)
- Godse (2022)
- Godsend (2004)
- Godsend (2014)
- The Godsend (1980)
- The Godson (1998)
- Godspeed (2016)
- Godspell (1973)
- Godzilla series:
  - Godzilla: (1954, 1998 & 2014)
  - Godzilla Raids Again (1955)
  - King Kong vs. Godzilla (1962)
  - Mothra vs. Godzilla (1964)
  - Ghidorah, the Three-Headed Monster (1964)
  - Invasion of Astro-Monster (1965)
  - Ebirah, Horror of the Deep (1966)
  - Son of Godzilla (1967)
  - Destroy All Monsters (1968)
  - All Monsters Attack (1969)
  - Godzilla vs. Hedorah (1971)
  - Godzilla vs. Gigan (1972)
  - Godzilla vs. Megalon (1973)
  - Godzilla vs. Mechagodzilla (1974)
  - Terror of Mechagodzilla (1975)
  - The Return of Godzilla (1984)
  - Godzilla 1985 (1985)
  - Godzilla vs. Biollante (1989)
  - Godzilla vs. King Ghidorah (1991)
  - Godzilla vs. Mothra (1992)
  - Godzilla vs. Mechagodzilla II (1993)
  - Godzilla vs. SpaceGodzilla (1994)
  - Godzilla vs. Destoroyah (1995)
  - Godzilla 2000 (1999)
  - Godzilla vs. Megaguirus (2000)
  - Godzilla, Mothra and King Ghidorah: Giant Monsters All-Out Attack (2001)
  - Godzilla Against Mechagodzilla (2002)
  - Godzilla: Tokyo S.O.S. (2003)
  - Godzilla: Final Wars (2004)
  - Shin Godzilla (2016)
  - Godzilla: Planet of the Monsters (2017)
  - Godzilla: City on the Edge of Battle (2018)
  - Godzilla: The Planet Eater (2018)
  - Godzilla: King of the Monsters (2019)
  - Godzilla vs. Kong (2021)
  - Godzilla Minus One (2023)
  - Godzilla x Kong: The New Empire (2024)
  - Godzilla Minus Zero (2026)

==== Goe–Gok ====
- Goemon (2009)
- Goetz von Berlichingen (1955)
- Goetz von Berlichingen of the Iron Hand (1925)
- Goetz von Berlichingen of the Iron Hand (1979)
- Gog (1954)
- Goggle Fishing Bear (1949)
- Gogita's New Life (2016)
- Gohatto (1999)
- Gohin Baluchor (2017)
- Gohine Shobdo (2010)
- Gohiner Gaan (2019)
- Goin' Coconuts (1978)
- Goin' Down the Road (1970)
- Goin' Fishin' (1940)
- Goin' South (1978)
- Goin' Straight (1917)
- Goin' to Town (1935)
- Goin' to Town (1944)
- Going All the Way (1997)
- Going to America (2014)
- Going Ape! (1981)
- Going Away 2013)
- Going Back (1983)
- Going Bananas (1987)
- Going to Bed Under Difficulties (1900)
- Going Berserk (1983)
- Going to Blazes (1933)
- Going Blind (2010)
- Going Bongo (2015)
- Going by the Book (2007)
- Going for Broke (1977)
- Going for Broke (2003) (TV)
- Going Bye-Bye! (1934)
- Going Cardboard (2012)
- Going Clear (2015)
- Going Crooked (1926)
- Going the Distance (1979)
- Going the Distance (2004)
- Going the Distance (2010)
- Going Down (1982)
- Going Equipped (1990)
- Going Furthur (2016)
- Going Gay (1933)
- Going! Going! Gone! (1919)
- Going! Going! Gosh! (1952)
- Going to Heaven (2015)
- Going Highbrow (1935)
- Going Hollywood (1933)
- Going to Kansas City (1998)
- Going the Limit (1925)
- Going the Limit (1926)
- Going to Mars: The Nikki Giovanni Project (2023)
- Going to the Mat (2004 TV)
- Going My Way (1944)
- Going Overboard (1989)
- Going to Pieces: The Rise and Fall of the Slasher Film (2006)
- Going Places (1938)
- Going Places (1974)
- Going to Press (1942)
- Going Sane (1987)
- Going Shopping (2005)
- Going Some (1920)
- Going South (1992)
- Going South (2009)
- Going South Shopping (1989)
- Going Spanish (1934)
- Going Steady (1958)
- Going Steady (1979)
- Going Straight (1916)
- Going Straight (1933)
- Going in Style: (1979 & 2017)
- Going Under (1991)
- Going Under (2004)
- Going Up (1923)
- Going Upriver: The Long War of John Kerry (2004)
- Going Vertical (2017)
- Going Wild (1930)
- Goitaca (2021)
- Gokaiger Goseiger Super Sentai 199 Hero Great Battle (2011)
- Gokarna (2003)
- Goke, Body Snatcher from Hell (1968)
- Gokula (2009)
- Gokuladasi (1948)
- Gokulam (1993)
- Gokulamlo Seetha (1997)
- Gokulathil Seethal (1996)
- Gokusen: The Movie (2009)

==== Gol–Gom ====
- Gol Gappe (2023)
- Gol Maal (1979)
- Gola Barood (1989)
- Golak Bugni Bank Te Batua (2018)
- Golam (2024)
- Golanthara Vartha (1993)
- Golapi Ekhon Bilatey (2010)
- Golapi Ekhon Traine (1978)
- Golapi Golapi (2014)
- Gold: (1932, 1934, 1955, 1974, 2013, 2014, 2016, 2017, 2022 Australian, 2022 Indian & 2024)
- Gold Coins (2017)
- Gold Diggers series:
  - Gold Diggers of Broadway (1929)
  - Gold Diggers of '49 (1935)
  - Gold Diggers of 1933 (1933)
  - Gold Diggers of 1935 (1935)
  - Gold Diggers in Paris (1938)
- Gold Dust Gertie (1931)
- Gold Fever (1952)
- Gold Heels (1924)
- Gold Lust (2024)
- A Gold Medal Winning Tramp Dog (2014)
- Gold Mine in the Sky (1938)
- Gold Raiders (1951)
- The Gold Rush (1925)
- Gold Rush Daze (1939)
- Gold Train (1965)
- Golda (2023)
- Golda's Balcony (2019)
- Golden Age (2006)
- Golden Apples of the Sun (1973)
- Golden Arm (2020)
- Golden Arrow: (1935 & 1949)
- The Golden Arrow: (1936 & 1962)
- Golden Balls (1993)
- Golden Beak (1928)
- The Golden Bowl (2000)
- Golden Boy: (1925 & 1939)
- A Golden Boy (2014)
- The Golden Boys (2008)
- Golden Brother (2014)
- The Golden Chance (1915)
- Golden Chicken (2002)
- Golden Chicken 2 (2003)
- Golden Chicken 3 (2014)
- The Golden Child (1986)
- A Golden Christmas (2009) (TV)
- The Golden Coach (1953)
- The Golden Compass (2007)
- Golden Dawn (1930)
- Golden Dawn Girls (2017)
- The Golden Doll (2016)
- Golden Earrings (1947)
- Golden Eighties (1986)
- Golden Girl (1951)
- The Golden Girls (1995)
- The Golden Lotus (1974)
- Golden Needles (1974)
- Golden Swallow (1968)
- The Golden Voyage of Sinbad (1974)
- Golden Yeggs (1950)
- GoldenEye (1995)
- Goldengirl (1979)
- The Goldfinch (2019)
- Goldfinger (1964)
- Goldie (1931)
- Golddigger (1914)
- Goldwyn Follies (1938)
- Golem: (1979 & 2000)
- The Golem: (1915 & 2018)
- Le Golem (1936)
- The Golem and the Dancing Girl (1917)
- The Golem: How He Came into the World (1920)
- Goliath Against the Giants (1961)
- Goliath Awaits (1981 TV)
- Goliath and the Barbarians (1959)
- Goliath at the Conquest of Damascus (1965)
- Goliath and the Dragon (1960)
- Goliath and the Rebel Slave (1963)
- Goliath and the Sins of Babylon (1963)
- Goliath and the Vampires (1961)
- GomBurZa (2023)
- Gomorrah (2008)

==== Gon ====
- Gon Shein Pyin Tae Chit Chin Thake Khar (2006)
- Gonarezhou (2019)
- Gondi (2020)
- Gondola (2023)
- Gone (2007)
- Gone (2012)
- Gone (2021)
- Gone in 60 Seconds (1974)
- Gone in 60 Seconds (2000)
- Gone Are the Dayes (1984)
- Gone Are the Days (2018)
- Gone Are the Days! (1963)
- Gone Baby Gone (2007)
- Gone Batty (1954)
- Gone with the Bullets (2014)
- Gone, But Not Forgotten (2003)
- Gone Dark (2003)
- Gone to the Dogs (1939)
- Gone to the Dogs (2006)
- Gone to Earth (1950)
- Gone Fishin' (1997)
- Gone Fishing (2008)
- Gone Fishing (2012)
- Gone Girl (2014)
- Gone, Gone Forever Gone (1996)
- Gone to Ground (1977) (TV)
- Gone Is the One Who Held Me Dearest in the World (2002)
- Gone Kesh (2019)
- Gone Missing (2013) (TV)
- Gone to the Mountain (1974)
- Gone in the Night (1996) (TV)
- Gone in the Night (2022)
- Gone Nutty (2002)
- Gone with the Pope (1976)
- Gone with the River (2015)
- Gone Shopping (2007)
- Gone to Texas (1986) (TV)
- Gone Too Far! (2013)
- Gone Too Soon (2010)
- Gone Up North for a While (1972)
- Gone with the West (1975)
- Gone with the Wind (1939)
- Gone with the Woman (2007)
- Gonin Saga (2015)
- Gonjiam: Haunted Asylum (2018)
- Gonks Go Beat (1965)
- Gonza the Spearman (1986)
- Gonzo Girl (2023)
- Gonzo: The Life and Work of Dr. Hunter S. Thompson (2008)

==== Goo ====
- Good (2008)
- Good Advice (2001)
- The Good Boss (2021)
- Good Boy! (2003)
- Good Boys (2019)
- Good Burger (1997)
- Good Burger 2 (2023)
- Good Bye, Lenin! (2003)
- The Good Catholic (2017)
- A Good Day to Die Hard (2013)
- Good Deeds (2012)
- Good Dick (2008)
- The Good Dinosaur (2015)
- The Good Doctor: (1939 & 2011)
- The Good Earth (1937)
- The Good Father (1985)
- Good Fortune (2025)
- The Good German (2006)
- The Good Girl: (2002 & 2004)
- The Good Girls (2018)
- Good Guys Wear Black (1978)
- Good Hair (2009)
- A Good Lawyer's Wife (2003)
- The Good Liar (2019)
- The Good Lie (2014)
- The Good Life: (1996, 1997, 2007 & 2008)
- Good Luck Charlie, It's Christmas! (2011 TV)
- Good Luck Chuck (2007)
- Good Luck to You, Leo Grande (2022)
- Good Manners (2017)
- Good Men, Good Women (1995)
- Good Morning (1955)
- Good Morning (1959)
- Good Morning and... Goodbye! (1967)
- Good Morning, Babylon (1987)
- Good Morning, Boys (1937)
- Good Morning, Vietnam (1987)
- Good Mourning (2022)
- The Good Neighbor (2016)
- Good Neighbor Sam (1964)
- Good Neighbours (2010)
- Good News: (1930 & 1947)
- Good Night, and Good Luck (2005)
- Good Night, Paul (1918)
- The Good Nurse (2022)
- A Good Old Fashioned Orgy (2011)
- Good One (2024)
- Good on Paper (2021)
- Good People (2014)
- Good Scouts (1938)
- The Good Shepherd (2006)
- The Good Son (1993)
- The Good Thief (2002)
- Good Time (2017)
- Good Times (1967)
- Good Will Hunting (1997)
- A Good Woman (2004)
- A Good Year (2006)
- The Good, the Bad and the Ugly (1966)
- The Good, the Bad, the Weird (2008)
- Goodbye Again: (1933 & 1961)
- Goodbye Casanova (2000 TV)
- Goodbye Christopher Robin (2017)
- The Goodbye Girl (1977)
- Goodbye Lover (1999)
- Goodbye South, Goodbye (1996)
- Goodbye Uncle Tom (1971)
- Goodbye Youth: (1918, 1927 & 1940)
- Goodbye, Columbus (1969)
- Goodbye, Dragon Inn (2003)
- Goodbye, Mr. Chips: (1939 & 1969)
- Goodfellas (1990)
- Goodnight Mister Tom (1998 TV)
- Goodnight Mommy (2014)
- The Goods: Live Hard, Sell Hard (2009)
- A Goofy Movie (1995)
- Goofy and Wilbur (1939)
- Goon (2011)
- The Goonies (1985)
- The Goose Steps Out (1942)
- Goosebumps (2015)
- Goosebumps 2: Haunted Halloween (2018)

==== Gop–Goz ====
- Gopal Krishna: (1929, 1938 & 1979)
- Gopaludu Bhoopaludu (1967)
- Gopi: (1970, 2006 & 2019)
- Gopi – Goda Meeda Pilli (2006)
- Gopi Gopika Godavari (2009)
- Gopi Kishan (1994)
- Gopi Krishna (1992)
- Gopura Vasalile (1991)
- Gopurangal Saivathillai (1982)
- Gor (1987)
- Gora Aur Kala (1972)
- Gora Automatikoa (2021)
- Goran (2016)
- Goransson's Boy (1941)
- Gorantha Deepam (1978)
- Gordon of Ghost City (1933)
- Gordon Lightfoot: If You Could Read My Mind (2019)
- Gordon's War (1973)
- Gordonia (2010)
- The Gore Gore Girls (1972)
- Gore, Quebec (2014)
- Gore Orphanage (2015)
- Gore Vidal: The United States of Amnesia (2013)
- Goree (2019)
- The Gorge (2025)
- Gorgeous (1999)
- A Gorgeous Girl Like Me (1972)
- The Gorgeous Hussy (1936)
- Gorgo (1961)
- Gori Tere Pyaar Mein (2013)
- Gorilla (2019)
- Gorilla at Large (1954)
- Gorillas in the Mist (1988)
- Gorky Park (1983)
- Gorosthaney Sabdhan (2010)
- Gosford Park (2001)
- Gosnell: The Trial of America's Biggest Serial Killer (2018)
- The Gospel (2005)
- The Gospel According to St. Matthew (1964)
- The Gospel of John (2003)
- Gospel Road: A Story of Jesus (1973)
- Gossip: (1923, 2000 American, 2000 Swedish & unreleased)
- Gotcha! (1985)
- Goth: (2003 & 2008)
- Gotham (1988 TV)
- Gothic (1986)
- Gothika (2003)
- Goti Lo (2025)
- Goto, Island of Love (1968)
- Gotta Kick It Up! (2002 TV)
- Gotti (2018)
- Gour Hari Dastaan (2015)
- Gouravam (2013)
- Goutte d'Or (2013)
- The Governess (1998)
- Govinda Govinda: (1994 & 2021)
- Govinda Naam Mera (2022)
- Gow the Headhunter (1931)
- Gowli (2023)
- Gowramma (2005)
- Gowravargal (2010)
- Gowri: (1963, 2004 & 2024)
- Gowri Ganda (1968)
- Gowri Kalyanam (1966)
- Gowri Putra (2012)
- Gowrisankaram (2003)
- Goya (2022)
- Goya or the Hard Way to Enlightenment (1971)
- Goya, a Story of Solitude (1971)
- Goya's Ghosts (2006)
- Goyescas (1942)
- Goyo (2024)
- Goyo: The Boy General (2018)
- Goyokin (1969)
- Gozu (2003)

=== Gr ===
==== Gra ====
- Grace: (2009 & 2014)
- Grace Is Gone (2008)
- Grace of Monaco (2014)
- Grace of My Heart (1996)
- Grace Quigley (1984)
- Gracie's Choice (2004)
- Graciela (1956)
- The Graduate (1967)
- The Graduates of Malibu High (1983)
- Graduation Day (1981)
- Graffiti (2006)
- Graffiti Bridge (1990)
- Grahan (2001)
- Grahana (1978)
- Grahanam (2004)
- Grahasti (1963)
- The Grail (1923)
- Grain (2017)
- Grain in Ear (2005)
- Grama Kanya (1936)
- Gramathu Athiyayam (1980)
- Gramatthu Minnal (1987)
- Gramavrikshathile Kuyil (2022)
- Grambling's White Tiger (1981) (TV)
- Grampy's Indoor Outing (1936)
- Gran Casino (1947)
- Gran Torino (2008)
- Gran Turismo (2023)
- The Grand (2008)
- Grand Avenue (1996) (TV)
- The Grand Budapest Hotel (2014)
- Grand Canyon: (1958 & 1991)
- Grand Canyon Adventure: River at Risk (2008)
- Grand Champion (2002)
- A Grand Day Out with Wallace and Gromit (1990)
- The Grand Duel (1972)
- Grand Exit (1935)
- Grand Hotel: (1927 & 1932)
- Grand Illusion (1937)
- Grand Prix: (1934, 1966 & 2010)
- Grand Slam: (1933, 1967 & 1978)
- Grand Theft Auto (1977)
- Grand Theft Parsons (2003)
- Le Grand Voyage (2004)
- Grand-Daddy Day Care (2019)
- Granddaughter of Ice (1980)
- Grande École (2004)
- La Grande Vadrouille (1966)
- Grandhotel (2006)
- Grandma: (1979 & 2015)
- Grandma's Boy: (1922 & 2006)
- Grandma's Reading Glass (1900)
- Grandma's Wedding (2019)
- The Grandmaster (2013)
- Grandmother’s House (1988)
- Grandview, U.S.A. (1984)
- Granny Get Your Gun (1940)
- The Grapes of Wrath (1940)
- Grass: (1925, 1999 & 2018)
- The Grass Is Greener (1960)
- Grass Roots (unreleased)
- Grasshopper (2015)
- The Grasshopper and the Ants (1934)
- Grassland (2022)
- Grassroots (2012)
- The Grave: (1996 & 2020)
- Grave Encounters (2011)
- Grave Encounters 2 (2012)
- Grave of the Fireflies (1988)
- Grave Halloween (2012) (TV)
- Grave Intentions (2021)
- Grave Robbers (1989)
- Grave of the Vampire (1972)
- The Gravedancers (2008)
- Graverobbers (1988)
- Graves Without a Name (2018)
- Gravesend (1996)
- Graveyard of Honor: (1975 & 2002)
- Graveyard Keeper's Daughter (2011)
- Graveyard Shift: (1987, 1990 & 2005)
- Gravity: (2009 & 2013)
- Gravy (2015)
- The Gravy Train (1974)
- Gray Lady Down (1978)
- The Gray Man: (2007 & 2022)
- Gray Matters: (2006 & 2014)
- Gray's Anatomy (1996)
- Grayson (2004)

==== Gre ====
- Grease (1978)
- Grease 2 (1982)
- Grease Live! (2016)
- Greased Lightning (1977)
- The Great Adventures of Captain Kidd (1953)
- The Great Alibi (2008)
- The Great Alligator River (1979)
- The Great Alone (1922)
- A Great Awakening (2026)
- Great Balls of Fire! (1989)
- The Great Beauty (2013)
- The Great Buck Howard (2009)
- The Great Buster: A Celebration (2018)
- The Great Caruso (1951)
- A Great Day in Harlem (1994)
- The Great Debaters (2007)
- The Great Detective (2017)
- The Great Dictator (1940)
- The Great Ecstasy of Robert Carmichael (2005)
- The Great Ecstasy of Woodcarver Steiner (1974)
- The Great Escape (1963)
- Great Expectations: (1917, 1934, 1946, 1974 TV, 1998, 1999 TV & 2012)
- The Great Flood (2025)
- Great Freedom (2021)
- The Great Gabbo (1929)
- The Great Game: (1930, 1953 & 2015)
- The Great Gatsby: (1926, 1949, 1974, 2000 TV & 2013)
- The Great Hack (2019)
- The Great Kidnapping (1973)
- The Great Lie (1941)
- The Great Locomotive Chase (1956)
- The Great Love: (1918, 1925, 1931, 1942 & 1969)
- The Great Lover: (1920, 1931 & 1949)
- The Great Madcap (1949)
- The Great Man (1956)
- The Great Man's Whiskers (1972) (TV)
- The Great McGinty (1940)
- The Great Moment: (1921 & 1944)
- The Great Morgan (1946)
- The Great Mouse Detective (1986)
- The Great Muppet Caper (1981)
- The Great Mystical Circus (2018)
- The Great New Wonderful (2006)
- The Great Outdoors (1988)
- The Great Pretender (2018)
- The Great Race (1965)
- The Great Raid (2005)
- The Great Rupert (1950)
- The Great Santini (1979)
- The Great Silence (1968)
- The Great St. Trinian's Train Robbery (1966)
- The Great Train Robbery: (1903, 1941 & 1978)
- The Great Waldo Pepper (1975)
- The Great Wall (2016)
- The Great War: (1959, 2007 TV, 2017 & 2019)
- Great White: (1981 & 2021)
- The Great White Hope (1970)
- The Great White Hype (1996)
- The Great Yokai War (2005)
- The Great Yokai War: Guardians (2021)
- The Great Ziegfeld (1936)
- Greater (2016)
- The Greatest: (1977 & 2009)
- The Greatest Beer Run Ever (2022)
- The Greatest Game Ever Played (2005)
- The Greatest Show on Earth (1952)
- The Greatest Showman (2017)
- The Greatest Story Ever Told (1965)
- Greed: (1924 & 2019)
- Greedy (1994)
- Greedy People (2024)
- The Greek Tycoon (1978)
- The Green Berets (1968)
- Green Book (2018)
- Green Card (1990)
- Green Card Fever (2003)
- The Green Cockatoo (1937)
- Green for Danger (1946)
- Green Dolphin Street (1947)
- Green Fire (1954)
- Green Fish (1997)
- The Green Goddess: (1923 & 1930)
- Green Grass of Wyoming (1948)
- The Green Hornet: (1940, 1994, 2006 & 2011)
- The Green Hornet Strikes Again! (1941)
- Green Ice (1981)
- The Green Inferno (2013)
- The Green Knight (2021)
- Green Lantern series:
  - Green Lantern: First Flight (2009)
  - Green Lantern: Emerald Knights (2011)
  - Green Lantern (2011)
- Green Mansions (1959)
- The Green Mile (1999)
- The Green Ray (1986)
- Green Room (2016)
- The Green Slime (1969)
- Green Snake (1993)
- Green Street Hooligans (2005)
- Green Tea (2003)
- The Green Years (1946)
- Green Zone (2010)
- Greenberg (2010)
- Greener Grass (2019)
- Greenfingers (2000)
- Greenland (2020)
- Greenland 2: Migration (2026)
- Greetings (1968)
- Greetings from Tim Buckley (2012)
- Gregory's Girl (1981)
- Gregory's Two Girls (1999)
- Gremlins (1984)
- Gremlins 2: The New Batch (1990)
- Grendel Grendel Grendel (1981)
- Greta (2018)
- Gretel & Hansel (2020)
- The Grey (2012)
- The Grey Fox (1982)
- Grey Gardens: (1975 & 2009 TV)
- Grey Matter (2011)
- Grey Owl (1999)
- The Grey Zone (2001)
- Greyhound (2020)
- Greystoke - The Legend of Tarzan, Lord of the Apes (1984)

==== Gri ====
- Gribiche (1926)
- Gribouille (1937)
- The Gribushin Family (1923)
- Gridiron Flash (1934)
- Gridiron Gang: (1993 & 2006)
- Gridlock'd (1997)
- Gridlocked (2015)
- Il Grido (1957)
- Grief (1993)
- The Grief of Others (2015)
- Grief Street (1931)
- Grierson (1973)
- Grievous Bodily Harm (1988)
- Griff the Invisible (2010)
- Griffin & Phoenix (2006)
- Griffin and Phoenix (1976)
- The Grifters (1990)
- Grill Point (2002)
- Grilled (2006)
- A Grim Becoming (2014)
- The Grim Comedian (1921)
- The Grim Game (1919)
- Grim Reaper (2007)
- Grimm (2003)
- Grimsby (2016)
- A Grin Without a Cat (1977)
- The Grinch (2018)
- Grind: (1997 & 2003)
- The Grind: 1915 & 2012)
- Grindhouse (2007)
- The Gringa & the Musician (2024)
- Gringo (2018)
- A Gringo Girl in Mexico (1951)
- El Gringo (2012)
- The Grinning Granger (1920)
- Das grinsende Gesicht (1921)
- The Griot (2021)
- The Grip of Evil (1916)
- The Grip of Iron (1920)
- The Grip of Jealousy (1916)
- The Grissom Gang (1971)
- The Grit of a Jew (1917)
- The Grizzlie Truth (2022)
- The Grizzlies (2018)
- Grizzly (1976)
- Grizzly II: Revenge (2020)
- Grizzly Man (2005)
- The Grizzly and the Treasure (1975)

==== Gro–Gry ====
- The Grocer's Son (2007)
- The Grocer's Wife (1991)
- The Grocery Clerk (1919)
- Grock (1931)
- Groenten uit Balen (2011)
- Grog (1982)
- The Groom (2016)
- Groom Lake (2002)
- A Groom from the Other World (1958)
- The Groom Wore Spurs (1951)
- Groomed (2021)
- The Groomsmen (2006)
- The Groomsmen: Second Chances (2024)
- Groove (2000)
- The Groove Tube (1974)
- Gross Anatomy (1989)
- Grosse Pointe Blank (1997)
- Grotesqqque (2026)
- Grotesque: (1988 & 2009)
- The Grotesque (1995)
- Ground (2024)
- The Ground (2001)
- The Ground Beneath My Feet (2019)
- Ground Control (1998)
- The Ground Truth (2006)
- Ground Zero: (1973, 1987 & 2025)
- Groundhog Day (1993)
- Grounding (2006)
- Grounds for Divorce: (1925 & 1960)
- Grounds for Marriage (1951)
- The Groundsman (2013)
- The Groundstar Conspiracy (1972)
- The Group (1966)
- Group Marriage (1973)
- Group Portrait with a Lady (1977)
- Group Sex (2010)
- Groupie Girl (1970)
- Grow (2025)
- The Grow (2012)
- The Grow 2 (2015)
- Grow Up, Tony Phillips (2013)
- Grow Your Own (2007)
- Growing Artichokes in Mimongo (1996)
- Growing the Big One (2010) (TV)
- Growing Down (2025)
- Growing Leg, Diminishing Skirt (1970)
- Growing Pains (1928)
- The Growing Pains Movie (2000 TV)
- Growing Pains: Return of the Seavers (2004 TV)
- Growing Up: (1971 & 1983)
- Growing Up in America (1988)
- Growing Up Brady (2000) (TV)
- Growing Up Female (1971)
- Growing Up and Other Lies (2015)
- Growing Up Smith (2017)
- Grown Up (1993)
- Grown Up Movie Star (2010)
- Grown Ups (2010)
- Grown Ups 2 (2013)
- Growth (2010)
- Growth of the Soil (1921)
- Große Freiheit Nr. 7 (1944)
- Grrr (2024)
- Grub Girl (2006)
- Grudge (2021)
- The Grudge series:
  - The Grudge: (2004 & 2020)
  - The Grudge 2 (2006)
  - The Grudge 3 (2008)
- Grudge Match (2013)
- Gruesome School Trip (2005)
- A Gruesome Twosome (1945)
- The Gruesome Twosome (1967)
- The Gruffalo (2009) (TV)
- The Gruffalo's Child (2011) (TV)
- Gruha Pravesam (1982)
- Gruhalakshmi (1938)
- Gruhalakshmi (1955)
- Gruhalakshmi (1967)
- Gruhalakshmi (1992)
- Gruhapravesam (1976)
- The Grump series:
  - The Grump (2014)
  - Happier Times, Grump (2018)
  - The Grump: In Search of an Escort (2022)
  - Long Good Thursday (2024)
- Grumpier Old Men (1995)
- Grumpy (1923)
- Grumpy (1930)
- Grumpy Cat's Worst Christmas Ever (2014) (TV)
- Grumpy Christmas (2021)
- Grumpy Old Men (1993)
- Grunt! The Wrestling Movie (1985)
- Gruppa krovi (2025)
- Gryphon (2007) (TV)
- Gryr i Norden (1939)

=== Gu ===
- Gu (2024)

==== Gua ====
- The Gua Sha Treatment (2001)
- Guadalcanal Diary (1943)
- Guadalupe Reyes (2019)
- Guai ai vinti (1954)
- Guang (2018)
- Guantanamera (1995)
- Guantanamera Boxe (2000)
- Guantanamo Circus (2013)
- The Guantanamo Trap (2011)
- Guantanamo's Child (2015)
- The Guarantee (2014)
- Guarany (1950)
- Guard (2019)
- The Guard: (1990, 2001 & 2011)
- Guard 13 (1946)
- Guard Dog (2004)
- Guard Me, My Talisman (1986)
- Guard No. 47 (2008)
- The Guard Post (2008)
- Guard That Girl (1935)
- The Guard from Underground (1992)
- The Guarded Village 1944 (1978)
- Guardia, guardia scelta, brigadiere e maresciallo (1956)
- Guardian: (2021 & 2024)
- The Guardian: (1917, 1984 TV, 1990, 2006 & 2026)
- Guardian Angel: (1994 & 2014)
- The Guardian Angel: (1934, 1942, 1978 & 1990)
- Guardian of the Field (2025)
- Guardian of the Wilderness (1976)
- Guardians (2012)
- Guardians (2017)
- The Guardians (2017)
- Guardians of the Clouds (2004)
- Guardians of the Formula (2023)
- Guardians of the Galaxy series:
  - Guardians of the Galaxy (2014)
  - Guardians of the Galaxy Vol. 2 (2017)
  - The Guardians of the Galaxy Holiday Special (2022)
  - Guardians of the Galaxy Vol. 3 (2023)
- Guardians of the Lost Code (2010)
- Guardians of Oz (2015)
- Guardians of the Tomb (2018)
- Guardians of the Wild (1928)
- Guarding Tess (1994)
- Guards of the North (1941)
- The Guardsman: (1925 & 1931)
- The Guatemalan Handshake (2006)

==== Gub–Gui ====
- Gubbi (2010)
- Gubbi Mele Brahmastra (2019)
- Gubeer (2014)
- Gudachari 116 (1966)
- Gudachari 117 (1989)
- Gudachari No.1 (1983)
- Guddi: (1961 & 1971)
- Guddi Gudda (1956)
- Guddiyan Patole (2019)
- Guddu (1995)
- Guddu Ki Gun (2015)
- Guddu Rangeela (2015)
- Gudgudee (1997)
- Gudhurathuge Niyaa (1993)
- Gudi Gantalu (1964)
- Gudia (1947)
- Gudia (1997)
- Gudrun (1992)
- Gudu Gudu Gunjam (2010)
- Gudumba Shankar (2004)
- Guernica (2016)
- Guerrero (2016)
- The Guerrilla: (1908 & 1973)
- Guerrilla: (1985 & 2011)
- Guerilla Marketing (2005)
- Guerilla from the North (1983)
- Guerillas in Pink Lace (1964)
- Guernica (1950)
- Guernica (2016)
- Guerrilla: The Taking of Patty Hearst (2004) (TV)
- Guess What We Learned in School Today? (1970)
- Guess Who (2005)
- Guess Who's Calling! (2025)
- Guess Who's Coming for Christmas? (2013)
- Guess Who's Coming to Dinner (1967)
- Guess Who's Sleeping in My Bed? (1973) (TV)
- Guest (2019)
- Guest (2020)
- The Guest: (2014 American, 2014 Chilean & 2017)
- Guest Artist (2019)
- Guest from the Future: 1985 TV & 2024)
- Guest iin London (2017)
- Guest of Honour: (1934 & 2019)
- Guest House: (1980 & 2020)
- Guest in the House (1944)
- Guest House Paradiso (1999)
- Guest House Room Number:201 (2008)
- Guest at One's Own Home (1957)
- The Guest Room (2021)
- Guest Wife (1945)
- Gugu and Andile (2008)
- Gugu's World (2026)
- Gugusse and the Automaton (1897)
- Guha (1981)
- Guidance (2014)
- Guidance Patrol (2012)
- Guide (1965)
- The Guide (2014)
- A Guide for the Married Man (1967)
- A Guide to Recognizing Your Saints (2006)
- Guidelines (2014)
- Guile of Women (1921)
- Guilt Is My Shadow (1950)
- The Guilt Trip (2012)
- Guilty: (1916, 1928, 1953, 2011 & 2020)
- The Guilty: (1947, 1975, 2000, 2018 & 2021)
- Guilty Bystander (1950)
- Guilty Hearts (2011)
- Guilty of Romance (2011)
- Guilty as Sin (1993)
- Guilty by Suspicion (1991)
- Guilty?: (1930 & 1951)
- Guimoon: The Lightless Door (2021)
- The Guinea Pig (1948)
- Guinea Pig series:
  - Guinea Pig: Devil's Experiment (1985)
  - Guinea Pig 2: Flower of Flesh and Blood (1985)
- Guinevere: (1994 TV & 1999)

==== Gul–Gum ====
- Gul-e-Bakavali (1924)
- Gul-E-Bakawali (1939)
- Gulaab Gang (2014)
- Gulaal (2009)
- Gulaam Chor (2023)
- Gulabi (1995)
- Gulabi (2014)
- Gulabi Gang (2012)
- Gulabi Talkies (2008)
- Gulag (1985)
- Guldasta (2011)
- Guldasta (2020)
- Gulebakavali (1955)
- Gulebakavali Katha (1962)
- Gulf (2017)
- The Gulf Between (1917)
- Gulf Stream Under the Iceberg (2012)
- Gulfam (1961)
- Gulkand (2025)
- Gullfjellet (1941)
- Gulliver en el país de los Gigantes (1903)
- Gulliver Mickey (1934)
- Gulliver Returns (2021)
- Gulliver's Travels: (1924, 1939, 1977, 1996 TV & 2010)
- Gulliver's Travels Among the Lilliputians and the Giants (1902)
- Gulliver's Travels Beyond the Moon (1965)
- The Gulls (2015)
- The Gullspång Miracle (2023)
- Gully (2019)
- Gulmohar (2009)
- Gulmohar (2023)
- Gulp (2011)
- Gultoo (2018)
- Gulumaal: The Escape (2009)
- Gulu Gulu (2022)
- Gumapang Ka sa Lusak (1990)
- Gumastha (1953)
- Gumasthan (2024)
- Gumasthavin Magal (1974)
- Gumasthavin Penn (1941)
- The Gumball Rally (1976)
- Gumby: The Movie (1995)
- Gumm (2019)
- Gummalam (2002)
- Gummibär & Friends: Operation Cotton Candy (2027)
- Gummibärchen küßt man nicht (1989)
- Gummo (1997)
- Gumnaam (1954)
- Gumnaam (1965)
- Gumnaam – The Mystery (2008)
- Gumnaami (2019)
- Gumnutz: A Juicy Tale (2007)
- Gump: The Dog That Taught People How to Live (2021)
- Gumraah (2023)
- Gumrah (1963)
- Gumrah (1993)
- Gumshoe (1972)

==== Gun–Guz ====
- Gun Crazy (1950)
- Gun Crazy: A Woman from Nowhere (2002)
- Gun Shy: (2000 & 2017)
- Gun Woman (2014)
- Guncrazy (1992)
- Gunfight in Abilene (1967)
- Gunfight at the O.K. Corral (1957)
- The Gunfighter (1950)
- A Gunfighter's Pledge (2008) (TV)
- Gung Ho (1986)
- Gung Ho! (1943)
- Gunga Din (1939)
- Gunjan Saxena: The Kargil Girl (2020)
- The Gunman: (1952 & 2015)
- Gunman (1983)
- Gunman in the Streets (1950)
- Gunpowder Milkshake (2021)
- Gunpowder, Treason & Plot (2004) (TV)
- Guns of El Chupacabra (1997)
- Guns and Guitars (1936)
- Guns for Hire (2015)
- The Guns of Navarone (1961)
- Guns for San Sebastian (1968)
- Guns Up (2025)
- Gunsight Ridge (1957)
- Gupt: The Hidden Truth (1997)
- Gurgaon (2016)
- Guri: (1986 & 2004)
- Gurkha (2019)
- Gurov and Anna (2014)
- Gurrumul (2018)
- The Guru: (1969 & 2002)
- Guru: (1980, 1989, 1997, 2007, 2012, 2016, 2017 & 2025)
- Guru Bangsa: Tjokroaminoto (2015)
- Guru Brahma (1992)
- Guru Dakshina: (1983 & 1987)
- Guru En Aalu (2009)
- Guru Geethaya (2015)
- Gus: (1976 & 2011)
- Gus and the Anarchists (1915)
- Gustaf Wasa (1928)
- Gustav Adolf's Page (1960)
- Gustave (2007)
- Gut zu Vögeln (2016)
- Guvva Gorinka (2020)
- Guy: (1996 & 2018)
- Guy and Madeline on a Park Bench (2009)
- A Guy Named Joe (1943)
- Guy Ritchie's The Covenant (2023)
- A Guy Thing (2003)
- Guyana: Crime of the Century (1979)
- Guyana Tragedy: The Story of Jim Jones (1980) (TV)
- Guys from the Army Band (1960)
- Guys and Balls (2004)
- Guys and Dolls (1955)
- Guys from Mars (2011)
- The Guyver (1991)
- Guyver: Dark Hero (1994)
- Guzaarish (2010)

=== Gw–Gy ===
- Gwen (2018)
- Gwen, or the Book of Sand (1985)
- Gwiaździsta eskadra (1930)
- Gwyneth of the Welsh Hills (1921)
- Gyakuryu (1924)
- Gyara Hazar Ladkian (1962)
- Gyeongju (2014)
- Gylne ungdom (1956)
- Gym Teacher: The Movie (2008)
- Gymkata (1985)
- The Gymnast (2006)
- Gyokairui Yamaoka Maiko (2011)
- Gypo (2005)
- Gypped in Egypt (1930)
- Gypped in the Penthouse (1955)
- Gypsies (1922)
- Gypsies Are Found Near Heaven (1975)
- Gypsies of the Night (1932)
- The Gypsies of Svinia (1998)
- Gypsy: (1937, 1962, 1993 TV, 2011 & 2020)
- The Gypsy (1975)
- Gypsy 83 (2001)
- Gypsy Blood: (1920 & 1934)
- Gypsy Colt (1954)
- Gypsy Curse (1953)
- Gypsy Davy (2011)
- The Gypsy and the Gentleman (1958)
- Gypsy Happiness (1981)
- Gypsy Love (1922)
- Gypsy Magic (1997)
- Gypsy Melody (1936)
- The Gypsy Moths (1969)
- Gypsy Wildcat (1944)
- The Gyurkovics Boys (1941)

Previous: List of films: F Next: List of films: H

== See also ==
- Lists of films
- Lists of actors
- List of film and television directors
- List of documentary films
- List of film production companies
