= Gharsallah =

Gharsallah (غرس الله, lit. "plant of God; seed of God"), is a Tunisian surname.

- Gharsallah, la semence de Dieu, 2007 documentary about a Tunisian man of this name
- Disappearance of Georgina Gharsallah, 2018 disappearance case in West Sussex, UK
- Karim Gharsallah, Tunisian Paralympics table tennis player, see Tunisia at the 2020 Summer Paralympics
- Amin Gharsallah, Tunisian rugby player, see 2009 end-of-year rugby union internationals
- Kadir Gharsallah, character in a 20098 Dutch movie, see Cahit Ölmez (actor)
