= Goutte d'Or (disambiguation) =

Goutte d'Or is an administrative quarter in Paris, France.

Goutte d'Or may also refer to:

- Goutte d'Or (2013 film), animated short film
- Sons of Ramses, 2022 film by Clément Cogitore
- The Golden Droplet (French: La Goutte d'Or), 1985 novel by Michel Tournier
