= Ghost of the forest =

Ghost(s) of the forest may refer to:

- Kagu (Rhynochetos jubatus), a bird species native to New Caledonia
- Ghosts of the Forest, a band fronted by Trey Anastasio of Phish
  - Ghosts of the Forest (album), a 2019 self-titled album
- "Ghosts of the Forest", an episode of the Beastmaster TV series
- The Berenstain Bears and the Ghost of the Forest, a 1988 book in the Berenstain Bears series

== See also ==
- Ghosts of Our Forest, a 2017 documentary film
