= The Goal =

The Goal may refer to:

- The Goal (novel), a management-oriented novel by Eliyahu M. Goldratt
- The Goal (1999 film), a Hindi drama film
- The Goal (2023 film), a Namibian film
- The Goal, a song by Leonard Cohen from Thanks for the Dance

== See also ==
- Goal (disambiguation)
