= Give Us This Day =

Give Us This Day may refer to "Give us this day our daily bread" from the Lord's Prayer.

Give Us This Day may also refer to:

- Give Us This Day (1943 film), a 1943 Australian propaganda documentary short film from Ken G. Hall
- Give Us This Day (1949 film), a 1949 British drama film directed by Edward Dmytryk
- Give Us This Day (Australian TV program), a 1956–1958 Australian religious television short program that aired on TCN-9
- Give Us This Day (Philippine TV program), a Philippine two-hour religious television program that has aired on SMNI TV 43 Davao since 2003
- Give Us This Day, a devotional magazine published by Liturgical Press
