= Golden Apples of the Sun =

"The golden apples of the sun" is the last line of the 1899 poem "The Song of Wandering Aengus" by W. B. Yeats.

Golden Apples of the Sun may also refer to:

== Music ==
- "Golden Apples of the Sun", a 1960 song setting the Yeats poem to music, by folk music duo Bud & Travis, from their album Naturally: Folk Songs for the Present
- Golden Apples of the Sun (album), a 1962 album by Judy Collins, which included the Bud & Travis song
- The Golden Apples of the Sun (album), a 2004 folk music compilation

== Other ==
- The Golden Apples of the Sun, a 1953 short story and anthology by Ray Bradbury
- Golden Apples of the Sun (film), a 1973 Canadian horror film
- The Golden Apples of the Sun : Twentieth Century Australian Poetry, a 1980 Australian poetry anthology

== See also ==
- Silver Apples of the Moon (disambiguation)
