= Silver Apples of the Moon =

"The silver apples of the moon" is a line from the 1899 poem "The Song of Wandering Aengus" by W. B. Yeats.

"Silver Apples of the Moon" can also refer to:

- Silver Apples of the Moon (Morton Subotnick album), 1967
- Silver Apples of the Moon (Laika album), 1994

== See also ==
- Silver Apples
- Golden Apples of the Sun (disambiguation)
