= Peruanos en el Mundo =

Travel documentary television series about Peruvian immigrants

Peruanos en el Mundo (English: Peruvians Around the World) is a weekly travel documentary television series that premiered on February 7, 2015, on SUR Peru TV. The series is hosted and created by Roberto Pazos, a journalist from Lima, Peru. The program documents the lives and experiences of Peruvian immigrants residing in various countries around the world. The series has continued airing continuously on SUR Peru TV since its premiere.

== Background ==
Pazos arrived in the United States as an immigrant from Peru and initially worked various jobs, including selling newspapers and magazines at a newsstand in New York City. He later held positions as a television reporter in Oklahoma and as an assignment editor for major news networks including CNN and Univision. According to Pazos, the television series was created as the first program dedicated entirely to documenting the stories of Peruvian immigrants.

== Format and scope ==
According to CNN Español, the show follows Pazos traveling with a backpack and camera across multiple continents to document the experiences of Peruvians living abroad. Each weekly episode features a different country and presents interviews, vignettes, and cultural segments about individual Peruvian immigrants and their communities.

As of 2017, the program had interviewed approximately 200 Peruvian immigrants across more than 120 cities in over 50 countries. Pazos told El Diario NY: "The best takeaway I got from my travels while filming my show is how despite the language barriers, the cultural challenges and even the economic difficulties, Peruvians around the world have managed to make it through."

== Production ==
Steve Hunsicker serves as Executive Producer of the series.

== Broadcasting and reach ==
The series premiered on SUR Peru TV on February 7, 2015, and has broadcast continuously on the network since that date in the United States and Canada. Through SUR Peru TV, the program reaches approximately 1.2 million subscribers via DIRECTV and 600,000 subscribers via cable providers throughout the United States.

From 2018 to 2020, the program was also broadcast on TV Perú, Peru's public national broadcaster, extending its reach to audiences throughout Peru's coastal, mountain, and Amazon regions through approximately 300 television stations nationwide.

== Publications ==
Pazos has authored two books related to the series:

Peruanos en el mundo (Spanish language), published 2016, ISBN 1511856394

Peruanos en el Mundo: Bicentenario 2021 (Spanish language e-book), published in 2021, ASIN B08XY82G58

== Related work ==
Pazos is also founder of "Filmed in Peru," a showcase of Peruvian cinema held in New York and other cities. He also directed the film The Gringa & the Musician.

== Reception and cultural context ==
According to government data, approximately 3.5 million Peruvians live outside their country of origin, representing a significant diaspora audience for the program. Media research indicates that diaspora television programs support cultural preservation and identity maintenance in migrant communities.
