= Lavinia Kapewasha =

Namibian director, producer, writer and actress

- Born: Namibia
- Education: East 15 Acting School, Essex
- Occupations: Director, producer, writer, actor
- Family: Marten Kapewasha, father
- Website: olafnamibia.com.na

Lavinia Kapewasha is a Namibian director, producer, writer and actor. She is an organiser of Windhoek-based Otjomuise Live Arts Festival (OLAF) and director of 2023 film The Goal.

== Personal life and education ==
As the youngest daughter of diplomat, Marten Kapewasha, Lavinia Tukuhole Kapewasha lived in India, South Africa and Russia as a child. In 2015 she graduated in theatre studies from the East 15 Acting School, Essex, UK. She has been based in Windhoek, Namibia since 2016.

== Work ==
Kapewasha co-founded Dark Crown Productions with Jenny Kadenge. She is production coordinator at the National Theatre of Namibia. As a writer she is inspired by screenwriters who direct, including Donald Glover, Rungano Nyoni and Wanuri Kahiu.

=== Film/TV director ===
Year	Title	Role	Ref
2019	litandu web series	Writer, director, actor	
2019	Untitled web series	Director	
2022	Hers, Yours, Mine	Director	
2022	Grootman	Director	
2023	The Goal	Director	

=== Actor ===
Year	Title	Director	Ref
2015	Moxie	Philip James McGoldrick	
2016	The Slow Knife	Fernando Lazzari	
2017	Silly Wits	Improvisational sketch comedy	
2017	Ominous	Jenny Kandenge	
2019	Every Woman	Senga Brockerhoff	
2019	The Date	Mikiros Garoes	

=== Producer ===
- Die Rooftop

== Nominations and festivals ==
- 2017 – nominated for Best Actress and Best Newcome Director at the Namibian Theatre and Film Awards
- 2020 – 'litandu' featured in the 27th Pan African Film Festival (PAFF)
