= The Gringa & the Musician =

- Promotional release poster
- Directed by: Roberto Pazos
- Written by: Roberto Pazos; Steve Hunsicker
- Produced by: Steve Hunsicker
- Cinematography: Steve Hunsicker; Roberto Pazos
- Edited by: Roberto Barba
- Production company: Pazos TV
- Release date: October 23, 2024 (Amazon Film Festival)
- Running time: 63 minutes
- Country: Peru
- Language: Spanish

The Gringa & the Musician (Spanish: La Gringa y el Músico) is a 2024 Peruvian documentary film co-written, filmed and directed by Roberto Pazos. It follows the life and murder of German environmentalist Aune Hartmann. The Executive Producer is Steve Hunsicker.

== Synopsis ==
The film tells the story and the crime without justice that involved Aune Hartmann, a German lawyer and environmentalist who was murdered in Copacabana in front of Lake Titicaca, Peru, allegedly at the hands of her partner Olguín Pacompía. On April 10, 2026, Peruvian police arrested Pacompia after 18 years in hiding. He was convicted and sentenced on August 5, 2026 to 35 years in prison.

== Release ==
It had its world premiere on October 23, 2024, at the 3rd Amazon Film Festival, then was screened on November 21, 2024, at the 11th Huánuco Film Festival. It then screened at the Festival de Cine Incontrastable in Huancayo and at the Festival Hanan Cine - Puno Peru. On Friday, December 20, 2024, it was presented in a special screening at the Metropolitan Museum of Lima. It premiered in Europe on May 16, 2025, in Karlsrule, Germany. During the screening, producer Steve Hunsicker announced that the police in Peru had reopened the search for the suspect following the release of the documentary. Director Roberto Pazos, in a newspaper interview before the screening, acknowledged his frustration with the lack of progress with the investigation after 16 years.

On April 16, 2025 the film had its North American Premiere at Filmed in Peru in New York City. On July 25, the movie premiered in Canada at the Peruvian Film Festival Toronto.

The film was selected to play in the 7th Ibero-American Film Festival in Miami on November 21, 2025. It was an official selection of the 40th Fort Lauderdale International Film Festival.

== Distribution ==
On November 11, 2025, the Peruvian Ministry of Culture awarded $100,000.00 Peruvian Soles for distribution of the film in Peru. In its award, it said the film was socially and culturally relevant.
