= Snehal R Nair =

Indian filmmaker

- Occupation: Filmmaker
- Known for: Germ
- Awards: Two National Film Awards

Snehal R Nair (also known as Shekhar Nair) is an Indian filmmaker based in Ahmedabad, Gujarat. He is best known for his film Germ for which he was given two National Film Awards Snehal Radhakrishnan Nair has also been awarded best experimental film for his directed film germ at tel aviv University film festival, which has also been screened at 30th Busan short film festival and has been a part of iffi Indian panorama at Goa India and also screened at 40th International film festival Rotterdam Netherlands Snehal R Nair that is Shekhar Nair is also the writer of a published book namely "A.i. text: a prequel to absurd" and also is writer of yet unpublished work 'matters of the cosmos" and "matter as information". Snehal R. Nair has his own rock band namely "Shekhar" snehal that is Shekhar Nair is the writer of an ongoing film documentary namely "A hypothesis concerning visual images: Thought as an edifice". ca.
