= Roberto Pazos =

Peruvian television journalist and documentary filmmaker

Roberto Pazos is a Peruvian television journalist, documentary filmmaker, and television producer, best known as the director of the documentary film The Gringa & the Musician, the creator and host of the travel documentary series Peruanos en el Mundo, and the co‑founder and programmer of the Peruvian film festival Filmed in Peru alongside Executive Producer Steve Hunsicker.

== Career ==
Pazos began his career as a television journalist in Peru before relocating to the United States, where he worked as an assignment editor for CNN en Español and Univision.

== The Gringa & the Musician ==
Pazos directed The Gringa & the Musician (Spanish: La Gringa y el Músico), a true-crime documentary recounting the 2008 murder of German environmentalist Aune Hartmann (portrayed by Marie Laure Beck) on Amantaní Island near Lake Titicaca, with Edson Mamani as the musician suspect Olguín Pacompía, who remains fugitive. Filmed in Puno with collaboration from regional filmmaker Henry Vallejo, the four-year investigation also shot on location in Bolivia, Germany and Brazil. The film exposes police incompetence and corruption in Peru and Bolivia. Premieres include the Festival de Cine Amazónico in Pucallpa, Huánuco, Huancayo, VI Festival Hanan Cine in Puno (where Pazos attended), and Lima on December 20, 2024. On November 11, 2025, the Peruvian Ministry of Culture awarded $100,000.00 Peruvian Soles for distribution of the film in Peru. In its award, it said the film was socially and culturally relevant.

== Duke ==
Pazos is the writer and director of the short film Duke (short film)

The film was selected to premiere at the OutShine LGBTQ Film Festival in Miami on October 19, 2026. It was also selected for the Fort Lauderdale International Film Festival's Savoir-faire Shorts on November 7, 2026.

== Peruanos en el Mundo ==
Pazos created and hosts Peruanos en el Mundo (Peruvians Around the World), a weekly travel documentary series profiling Peruvian diaspora stories, which premiered February 7, 2015, on Sur Perú TV. It also aired on TV Peru from 2018 to 2020. CNN en Español interviewed Pazos about the series on April 12, 2018. Steve Hunsicker serves as executive producer.

== Filmed in Peru ==
Pazos co-founded Filmed in Peru, an annual U.S. festival showcasing Peruvian cinema in New York City, Miami, and Long Island expanding from 5 films in early years to 20 films by 2025.

== Filmography ==
Year	Title	Role	Notes
2024	The Gringa & the Musician	Director	Documentary film
2015–present	Peruanos en el Mundo	Creator, host	Television series
2023–present	Filmed in Peru	Co-founder, programmer	Film festival
2026	Duke	Director, writer	Short Film

== See also ==
The Gringa & the Musician

Peruanos en el Mundo

Filmed in Peru

Steve Hunsicker

Cinema of Peru
