= A Moment of Happiness =

2020 Malaysian Mandarin-language comedy film

- Directed by: Tai Min Hwee
- Produced by: JY Teng, Lomo Pictures, Sunstrong Entertainment
- Starring: Lin Min Chen; Tul Pakorn; Chan Fong; Mimi Chu; Danny One; Richard Ng; Thian Siew Kim; Susan Shaw; Happy Polla
- Edited by: kenzir leow , hamster low
- Distributed by: MM2 Entertainment
- Release dates: 25 January 2020 (Malaysia, Singapore)
- Running time: 86 minutes
- Country: Malaysia
- Languages: Mandarin some Thai

A Moment of Happiness (Chinese: 新年泰疯狂) is a 2020 Malaysian Mandarin-language comedy film. In the film, a fake social media celebrity's relationship with a Thai boy goes online and becomes sensation. To keep their popularity, now her family have to hide the secret from the boyfriend and his family.

The film is released on 25 January 2020 in Malaysia and Singapore. It is one of the four 2020 Malaysian Chinese New Year films, including The God of Wealth, Fight Lah! Kopitiam, and Good Wealth 2020.

== Synopsis ==
Zhen wants to be internet famous, so she works with friends to create a pretty rich girl version of herself online. It turns out to be successful, now Zhen becomes a popular social media celebrity. One day, she meets and falls in love with Nat, a Thai tourist. Their romance quickly becomes internet sensation. In reality, Nat is from a rich family, but the real Zhen is from an average family only. To maintain her popularity, Zhen have to continue acting. Zhen's father feels it is not right, but now the whole family will have to help her keeping the reality as a secret, from her boyfriend and the whole internet, how far can it goes?

== Cast ==
- Lin Min Chen, as Zhen
- Tul Pakorn, as Nat
- Chan Fong, as Zhen's father
- Mimi Chu
- Danny One
- Richard Ng
- Thian Siew Kim
- Susan Shaw
- Happy Polla
