= Marten Kapewasha =

Namibian diplomat and politician

- Born: 19 December 1949; Oshinyadhila, Oshana Region
- Education: Ongwediva Training College; Mikhail Lomonosov Academy, Moscow
- Children: Lavinia Kapewasha, actor, director

Marten Nenkete Kapewasha (born 19 September 1949) is a Namibian diplomat and politician. A member of the SWAPO Central Committee since 1991, Kapewasha was appointed Namibia's High Commissioner to India in September 2005 following a six-year stint in the same position in Russia.

== Education ==
Born in Oshinyadhila, Oshana Region, Kapewasha graduated from Ongwediva Training College in 1970. He earned his Senior Certificate in Economics, Geography and History via correspondence in 1981. In 2003, he earned a diploma in Security, Defence and Law Enforcement at the Mikhail Lomonosov Academy in Moscow.

== Namibian War of Independence ==
Kapewasha was a SWAPO youth activist until his arrest alongside Jerry Ekandjo and Jacob Nghidinwa in 1973. He then served eight years on Robben Island, being released in 1981. He then began teaching at an independent school in Gibeon in the Hardap region. Following release, he rejoined political activism with the SWAPO Youth League and was elected Deputy Secretary of the organization in 1989.

== Political career ==
Kapewasha won a seat in the 1992 Regional Council elections in Wanaheda, which led to his representation of Khomas region in the National Council. From 1994 to 1996, he served as Namibia's Deputy Minister of Youth and Sport. From 1996 to 1999, he served as Minister of Lands, Resettlement and Rehabilitation.

== Sources ==
- Namibian Institute for Democracy Guide to Namibian Politics, 2007
