= GG Bond =

Chinese animated TV series

- Chinese: 猪猪侠
- Genre: Action; Comedy; Fairy tale; Adventure
- Created by: Gu Zhibin
- Directed by: Gu Zhibin; Lu Jinming
- Voices of: Lu Shuang; Zu Qing; Xu Jingwei
- Opening theme: "GG Bond Theme Song"
- Countries of origin: China; United States (seasons 18–present)
- Original languages: Mandarin; English (seasons 18–present)
- No. of seasons: 18
- No. of episodes: 1,812

Production
- Producers: Gu Yanmei; Liu Ziqun
- Running time: 15 minutes; 20 minutes (season 2-3); 10 minutes (season 4); 13 minutes (season 17)
- Production company: Guang Dong Winsing Company Limited

Original release
- Network: CCTV 14; JIA JIA Cartoon; Aniworld TV; Shanghai Toonmax TV; CCTV 1; Heilongjiang Satellite TV; Jiangsu Satellite TV; Children's channel of Zhejiang Television Station
- Release: October 1, 2005 – present

GG Bond (simplified Chinese: 猪猪侠; traditional Chinese: 豬豬俠) is a Chinese animated fantasy television show created by Zhibin "Ben" Gu and produced by WinSing Animation. The series began in 2005 and has aired for 18 seasons. The production company has distributed one season of episodes yearly since 2005.

For the 18th season, the show was completely redesigned and the characters were given new names. This revamp was developed with the help of Al Kahn, the former CEO of 4Kids Entertainment, who brought in some American writers. Starting with this season, the show was given the new English title Kung Fu Pork Choppers.

There are currently eleven theatrical films based on the TV series: GG Bond Hatching (2012), GG Bond 2 (2014), GG Bond Movie: Ultimate Battle (2015), GG Bond: Guarding (2017),GG Bond: Lollipop in Fantasy (2019), GG Bond: Diary of Dinosaur (2021), GG Bond: Ocean Mission (2022), GG Bond: Racing 72H (2023), GG Bond: Interstellar Mission (2024), I'm Bond, GG Bond (2025) and GG Bond: Race Through Time (2026).

== Plot ==
The show follows the titular GG Bond, an intelligent, immature, and mischievous humanoid pig living in a world where the magic of fairy tales has coalesced with modern society. He retains a close circle of acquaintances in the fellow pigs Phoebe (菲菲), Super Q (超人强), Bobby (波比), S-Daddy (小呆呆), and Dr. Mihoo (迷糊博士). Each season follows a different iteration of this team in the series' multiverse, with only their names and broad personalities remaining consistent. These universes occasionally cross over with each other in central story arcs.

Most episodes of GG Bond are comedies with moral lessons regarding the values of courage, friendship, harmony, integrity, perseverance, and respect for elders. Environmental issues often discussed include environmental damage, deforestation, and pollution. Episodes of the series often include humorous takes on classic fairy tales with modern technology.

=== Kung Fu Pork Choppers ===
- Hampton is the leader of the Kung Fu Pork Choppers. His superpower is super speed.
- Hamgelina is the smartest member of the team. Her superpower is the manipulation of gravity.
- Pigcasso is the fun-loving trickster of the team. His superpower is multiplying himself into clones.
- La Puerca is the tallest and strongest member of the team. Her superpower is super strength.
- Glorious P.I.G. is the team's pompous jock. His superpower is invisibility.

=== Villains ===
- Blort is a hotheaded robot who is the commander of the Stormfront Troopers.
- Carl is Blort's sidekick, a neurotic bat-like creature who wears metal armor.
- Karnage is an eagle who is the strategist of the Stormfront Troopers.
- Foggy is a bat-like creature with the ability to create fog.

=== Supporting characters ===
- Ziglet is a martial artist pig who trains the Kung Fu Pork Choppers.
- Swinestyn is a scientist pig who helps the Kung Fu Pork Choppers.
- Mr. Spork is Swinestyn's mechanical helper.

== Reception and awards ==
- Winner of "Domestic Animation Golden Award" of the 17th Shanghai TV Festival.
- Nominated for the 2009 "Best Domestic Animation" at Shanghai TV Festival.
- Winner of the 2009 KAKU Annual "Best Animated Series" as reported by Beijing Review.
