= Fight Lah! Kopitiam =

2020 Malaysian Cantonese-language comedy film

- Directed by: Matt Lai
- Starring: Jack Lim; Cedric Loo; Wan Wai Fun; Uncle Frankie; Steve Yap; Jaspers Lai; Chang Yong; Han Xiiao Aii
- Production company: Asia Tropical Films
- Distributed by: GSC Movies
- Release date: 30 January 2020
- Running time: 97 minutes
- Country: Malaysia
- Languages: Cantonese some Hakka some Mandarin

Fight Lah! Kopitiam (Chinese: 作战啦！茶室总动员) is a 2020 Malaysian Cantonese-language comedy film. It tells the story of a Kopitiam family, who has to fight and win in a boxing match, in order to keep their shop and bring glory back to the business.

The film is released on 30 January 2020 in Malaysia. It is one of the four 2020 Malaysian Chinese New Year films, including A Moment of Happiness, The God of Wealth, and Good Wealth 2020.

== Synopsis ==
Kopitiam Ada Bukit Ada Air is very famous for its white coffee. But after the founder suffers from Alzheimer's disease, the white coffee's secret recipe has since lost. Now his son Bao Li Jin and wife try hard to maintain the kopitiam business and declining customers. But things got worse when an arrogant developer, Tao wants to acquire the kopitiam lot. Bao is forced to sell the shop, but he refuses. Bao ends up accepting a boxing match challenge by Tao. Now Bao will have to fight and win Tao in the match to keep the shop, can he win the match? Can their traditional kopitiam business return to its glory?

== Cast ==
- Jack Lim
- Cedric Loo
- Wan Wai Fun
- Uncle Frankie
- Steve Yap
- Jaspers Lai
- Chang Yong
- Han Xiiao Aii
- Shir Chong
- Kenny Gan
- Chew Kuan Mei
- Mike Chua

== Reception ==
=== Box office ===
Despite the impact of the COVID-19 pandemic on cinema during January 2020, the movie still able to earn RM2 million in Malaysia alone in the first 10 days since the premiere.
