= Filmed in Peru =

International film festival showcasing Peruvian cinema in the United States

Filmed in Peru is an annual international film festival that showcases Peruvian cinema and filmmakers in the United States, with principal screenings in New York City, Miami, and recently Long Island.

== Overview ==
The festival is held primarily in April each year at venues such as Village East Cinema in Manhattan, SilverSpot Cinema in Miami, Cinema Arts Centre in Huntington (Long Island) and the King Juan Carlos Center at New York University.

In 2025, Filmed in Peru expanded for the first time to Long Island, presenting its program at Huntington Cinema Arts Centre with strong audience turnout and local Peruvian American community involvement.

Programming includes a wide variety of genres—drama, comedy, documentary, and true crime—showcasing authentic stories that reflect Peru's diverse culture and society. The festival often features Q&A sessions with filmmakers to foster interaction between creators and audiences.

== Notability and impact ==
Filmed in Peru is recognized in U.S. and international media as a key cultural event highlighting the richness of Peruvian cinema. Independent news coverage praises it as an essential showcase that brings authentic Peruvian narratives to wider audiences and spotlights emerging and established talent from Peru.

Latincolors magazine notes the festival's importance in connecting Latino communities and fostering cultural pride in the U.S. Northeast.

Collaboration with local organizations such as the Peruvian American Chamber of Commerce Alliance (PACCALLIANCE) has broadened its reach and cultural impact in Long Island.

== Notable films ==
The 2025 edition featured several prominent Peruvian films:

Mistura, directed by Ricardo de Montreuil, explores cultural diversity and social perseverance in Peru, with references to Peruvian poet César Vallejo. It was highly praised at the festival's Long Island debut.

This is the U (Esta es la U) by Daniel Farfán Salazar presents localized cultural narratives.

Family Album, directed by Joel Calero, known for intimate storytelling about Peruvian life.

Diógenes, directed by Leonardo Barbuy, tells the story of two brothers raised in isolation within an Andean community; it received critical acclaim during the festival.

Past festival years have also included box office hits like Queens (Reinas), which won Best Film at the 2025 Swiss Film Awards.

== Cultural elements ==
The 2025 Long Island festival included traditional Peruvian dance performances such as the marinera, featuring champion dancers Ashley Misaray, Brayan Medina, and Christopher Sánchez.

Event attendees also enjoyed Peruvian gastronomy with traditional pisco and culinary fusions, deepening the cultural experience.

== Festival guests and industry role ==
The festival annually attracts notable filmmakers, actors, and industry professionals from Peru and the U.S., serving as a cultural ambassador and platform for networking and exchange.

Prominent guests include director Ricardo de Montreuil, director Francisco Lombardi and actor Juana Burga.

The festival was created in 2023 by Roberto Pazos with Steve Hunsicker as Executive Producer.

== See also ==
Cinema of Peru

List of film festivals in North America
