= Going Blind =

- Directed by: Joseph Lovett
- Produced by: Joseph Lovett; Hilary Klotz Steinman
- Edited by: Jason Szabo; Jamie Hogan
- Release date: 2010
- Country: United States
- Language: English

Going Blind is a feature-length documentary about vision loss in the United States. Directed by Joseph Lovett, produced by Joseph Lovett and Hilary Klotz Steinman and edited by Jason Szabo and Jamie Hogan. Going Blind premiered at the World Ophthalmology Congress in Berlin in June 2010 and opened in New York at the Quad Cinema in October 2010.

The film interweaves Lovett's struggle to keep his glaucoma at bay with the stories of six people he meets who are dealing with different levels of sight loss. The film shows that losing vision is not death but a different perspective and shows how much is available in terms of vision enhancement techniques, low vision therapy such as at Lighthouse International, and new technology to keep people with sight loss engaged in their lives.

Going Blind is in educational distribution. An evaluation report of the film's effectiveness and an outreach toolkit on how organizations can best use the film can be downloaded from the homepage of the website as well. Going Blind is also available for streaming and downloading at Amazon.com. The film has been financed through grants from the Reader's Digest Partners for Sight Foundation, Pfizer Ophthalmics, the National Institutes of Health and others. The film was released to limited theatres on October 8, 2010.
