= GG Bond 2 =

2014 Chinese animated adventure comedy film

- The poster for the movie. From left to right: S-Daddy, GG Bond and Phoebe. On the back: Super Q and Bobby.
- Directed by: Gu Zhibin; Lu Jinming
- Based on: GG Bond by Zhibin Gu
- Starring: Lu Shuang; Zu Qing; Chen Zhirong; Xu Jingwei
- Production company: WinSing
- Release date: 31 May 2014
- Running time: 88 minutes
- Country: China
- Language: Mandarin
- Box office: US$6.67 million

GG Bond 2, also known as GG Bond and the Beanstalk (Chinese: 猪猪侠之勇闯巨人岛), is a 2014 Chinese animated adventure comedy film directed by Gu Zhibin and Lu Jinming. The film is part of the GG Bond film series, following GG Bond Hatching (2012) and followed by GG Bond Movie: Ultimate Battle (2015).

The films is an adaptation of Jack and the Beanstalk. In the film, the robber Jack steals the Goose that Laid the Golden Eggs, and an angry giant attempts to retrieve it.

== Plot ==
When Fairy World residents are in trouble, they usually turn to Ready-To-Help Office for help. GG Bond, Phoebe and SDaddy have been on the go all day, trying to deal with all sorts of trifles. GG Bond accidentally gets a treasure which was actually stolen from Titan Island by robber Jack. To get the treasure back, Jack plays some tricks which drag them all into a dangerous journey.

After innumerable hardships, they finally arrive at Titan Island. However, Jack brings them another trouble that he insists to take away the Giant's goose which lays golden eggs. The Giant is furious and starts in hot pursuit. The moment they are flying away from the Titan Island, Jack smugly tells GG Bond the truth. Hearing that, GG Bond decides to help the Giant to get his goose back. And Jack deserves his penalty in the end.

== Cast ==
- Lu Shuang
- Zu Qing
- Chen Zhirong
- Xu Jingwei

== Box office ==
The film has grossed US$6.67 million at the Chinese box office.
