= Germ (film) =

2010 Hindi film

- Directed by: Snehal R Nair
- Produced by: Satyajit Ray Film and Television Institute
- Release date: 2010
- Country: India
- Language: Hindi

Germ is a 2010 Hindi language film directed by Snehal R Nair and produced by Satyajit Ray Film and Television Institute. The film won two National Film Awards for Best Non-Feature Film and Best Editing at the 58th National Film Awards. It was among the 21 non-features selected to be screened as part of the Indian Panorama section at the International Film Festival of India in Panaji, Goa.

The film uses abstract visuals and a black-and-white style to depict the human experience, including the effects of cancer, in a subtle and moving way. It explores themes of growth and perception, showing how our view of the world changes as we grow up, using a collection of passport photos to tell the story effectively.

== Awards ==
58th National Film Awards
Year	Award	Category	Recipient	Ref
2010	National Film Awards	Best Non-Feature Film	Snehal R Nair	
2010	National Film Awards	Best Editing	Tinni Mitra	
