= Disappearance of Georgina Gharsallah =

Unsolved 2018 disappearance of 30 year-old British woman from Sussex

Georgina Gharsallah
- Born: 29 October 1987; Brighton, Sussex, England
- Disappeared: 7 March 2018 (aged 30); Worthing, West Sussex, England
- Status: Missing for 8 years, 3 months and 12 days
- Parents: Gassem Gharsallah (father); Andrea Gharsallah (mother)

Georgina Gharsallah (born 29 October 1987) is an English woman who went missing after leaving her mother's house in Worthing, West Sussex, on 7 March 2018.

== Background ==
Georgina Gharsallah was born in Brighton, Sussex in 1987. Her parents were Andrea and Gassem Gharsallah. Gassem was a Libyan national who attended university in Brighton where he met Andrea who was English. The couple had four daughters of whom Georgina ('Gina') was the second-eldest. Shortly after Georgina was born, the family relocated to Libya where they lived until 1998. Gharsallah spoke Arabic. After returning to the UK, the family settled in Worthing.

It was reported that Georgina suffered from mental health issues including bulimia and social anxiety. At the time of her disappearance, she was unemployed and was recently estranged from her partner. She had two children from a previous relationship. Gharsallah had moved back in with her mother, although she was still meeting her former partner regularly. She would sometimes stay with friends in Brighton. Family members reported that she was prone to binge-drinking. Although intelligent and articulate, Gharsallah did not develop a stable lifestyle or career.

A Channel 4 TV documentary show investigated Gharsallah’s case in 2025. The investigation paid significant attention to Gharsallah’s associations in the Brighton area. She had worked for a time in a kebab shop, then-owned and used as a front by an Albanian crime family. This family reportedly supplied Class A drugs in the Brighton and Worthing area. The family gang enjoyed a reputation for violence. Gharsallah appeared to be well-acquainted with members of this family. The father of her two children had also worked in the kebab shop.

== Disappearance ==
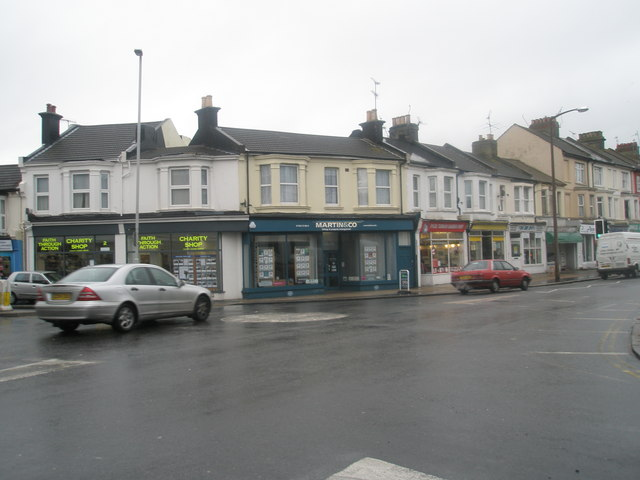
Clifton Road, Worthing, Sussex where Georgina Gharsallah was last confirmed as sighted

=== Last known movements ===
Gharsallah left her mother's house on Wednesday, 7 March 2018 at around 09:30. She told her mother that she was having problems with her mobile phone and that she would visit a phone shop to seek advice. She also said that she would visit the Jobcentre Plus in Worthing town centre and would meet her father later in the morning. She asked for and received a small loan from her mother to pay for having her phone repaired. She was recorded on CCTV at around 09:50 entering the nearby Clifton Food and Wine shop in Clifton Road, Worthing. The shop manager would later recall that Gharsallah had asked him for help with her phone and that he had directed her to a specialist phone shop. This would be the last confirmed sighting of Gharsallah. She did not visit the local Jobcentre as planned and did not keep her appointment with her father. There is no record or recollection of her entering any of the phone shops in Worthing that day. Subsequent tracking of her mobile phone indicated its last use at 03:00 on the day and that it had left the network shortly after 11:30 while still connected to a local mast in Worthing. It never reconnected to the network. Gharsallah's bank accounts and bank cards have not been used since.

=== Reported missing ===
Andrea was not initially disturbed when Gharsallah did not return to her house later that day since she was familiar with her daughter's lifestyle. She assumed that Gharsallah had either gone to stay with friends or had returned to her ex-partner. It was only the following week that Andrea became alarmed. Gharsallah failed to make arrangements to host her two sons for the weekend as was normal. Her ex-partner telephoned to say that he had not heard from Gharsallah for several days and was concerned about her. Andrea spent several days attempting to contact her daughter without success. She contacted Sussex Police on Saturday, 17 March 2018 to report Gharsallah as a missing person.

== Investigation ==
=== Progress of the enquiry ===
The Sussex Police investigation of Gharsallah's disappearance was significantly slow to get started. In recent years, an average of around 350,000 people per year are reported missing in England and Wales. The large majority of these cases are quickly resolved within 48 hours when the missing person reappears or is traced. Police do not prioritise cases where the missing person is not vulnerable and where there is no evidence of violence. The homes of Gharsallah's mother Andrea and ex-partners were searched and checks were initiated on her mobile phone and bank accounts. CCTV recordings from the immediate vicinity of Andrea's house were checked and this disclosed the recording of Gharsallah at a shop in Clifton Road. A public appeal for information was made. After three weeks, the disappearance was considered suspicious and the investigation was upgraded. However, it made little progress. Various theories for Gharsallah's disappearance were considered including :

- That she had gone away voluntarily to escape problem issues in her life. This was plausible given issues in her life history. She was known to have associations in Brighton, London, and with a wider Arab circle who might have assisted in such an escape, but she never subsequently contacted friends or family members. Given Gharsallah's closeness to her two young children, this theory is improbable.
- That she had committed suicide in a manner that did not allow her body to be found. This was plausible given aspects of her personal history, although that history contained no suggestion of suicidal intent.
- That she had been abducted and murdered. A variation on this is that she suffered a misadventure and people she was with found it expedient to conceal her body rather than report the matter. In the absence of evidence to the contrary, this is considered the most likely explanation of her fate.

Gharsallah's family sought information via appeals over social media. Notably, Andrea set up a Facebook page and this attracted many reported sightings, offers of information and comments. Andrea passed much of this on to the police who did not find all of it to be credible. Potential witnesses would often withdraw or modify information when approached by detectives. Some of the reported sightings were determined to be cases of mistaken identity. Two men were briefly arrested as a result of such a report, but were quickly released without charge.

=== Sighting ===
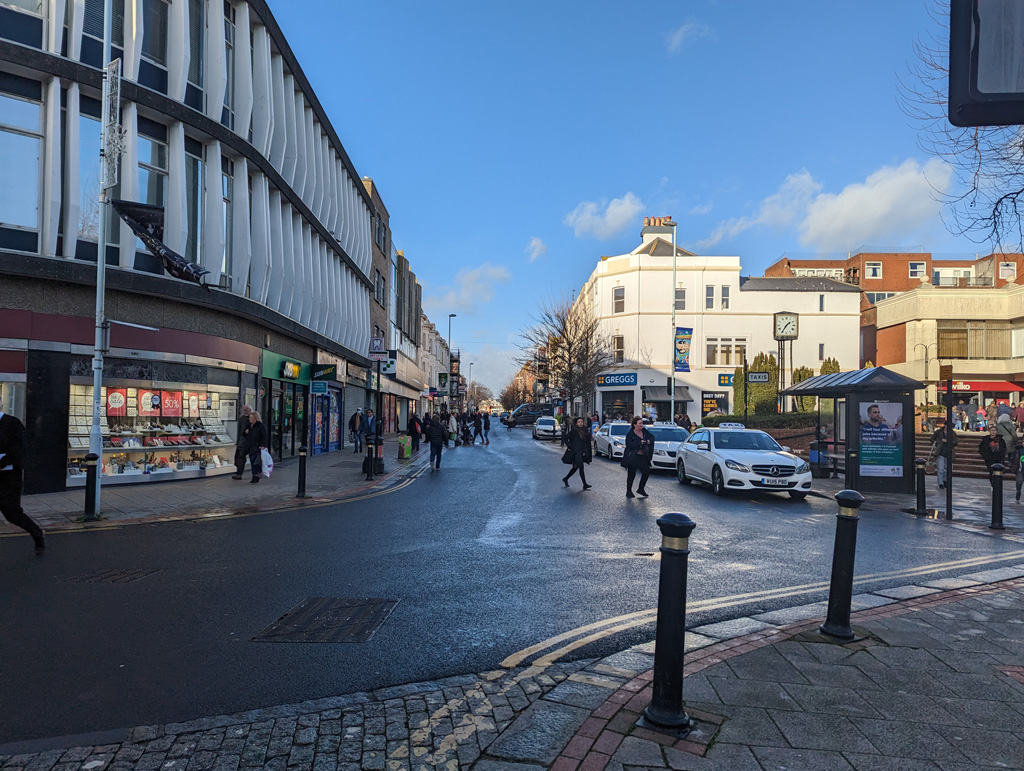
Chapel Road, Worthing, looking north where CCTV of the afternoon of the disappearance showed two unidentified women walking together, one resembling Gharsallah

CCTV footage was obtained by police from many sites in Worthing and one item was judged relevant. At around 15:30 on 7 March 2018, two women were recorded together in Worthing town centre and one of them resembled Gharsallah. The video footage was circulated by the police in August 2019 with a request for information, but the two women were never identified. Some observers questioned whether the woman in the afternoon video was actually Gharsallah. One obvious discrepancy is that Gharsallah was wearing black high-heeled boots in the morning video at Clifton Road but the woman in the town centre that afternoon was wearing tan coloured flat-heeled boots. For the two sightings to be the same person, it would require that Gharsallah had changed her footwear during the day.

The case was featured on the BBC Crimewatch TV programme in October 2018. The Crimestoppers charity offered a £5,000 reward for information leading to the conviction of Gharsallah's abductor. In August 2019, the police finally upgraded the investigation to that of a murder enquiry at which point the Crimestoppers reward was raised to £10,000.

=== Dissatisfaction with the police enquiry ===
Gharsallah's family quickly became dissatisfied with the pace of the police investigation and started their own crowd-funded enquiry. In addition to a dedicated Facebook page, an actress was engaged in order to film a reconstruction of Gharsallah's last known movements. Family members and volunteers searched sites around the Worthing area where they considered it possible that her body had been concealed. The family also brought in retired detectives to review the police enquiry. Information generated through social media was passed on to the police who were not always as responsive as the family wished. In particular, the police declined to arrest and question people without what they considered to be good reason. The police similarly declined to search sites without evidence that anything was concealed there. Most notably, the family requested that work on the Teville Gate development site in Worthing was stopped while a full search of the site was made. The police refused to comply with the request.

In July 2020, Gharsallah's family asked for an independent review of police failings in the case. The family submitted a list of those claimed failings to Jo Shiner, the newly appointed Sussex Police chief constable. The substance of the failings was that the police enquiry had been slow to start, poorly resourced and lacking in commitment. Particular issues included: a failure to collect CCTV evidence from town centre premises until a time at which much relevant footage was no longer available. Some of the footage collected was lost and it took over a year for the police to review the rest.

The seemingly low key police approach to Gharsallah's disappearance was contrasted with police enquiries into the similar cases of Claudia Lawrence and Madeleine McCann. In these two cases, extended enquiries were made which included arrests, interrogations and site excavations. Some observers suggested that race may have been a factor; Lawrence and McCann were both White, while Gharsallah was mixed-race. It was also pointed out that the initial Crimestoppers reward for information on Gharsallah had been £5,000 while at a similar stage in the 2009 Lawrence enquiry the equivalent reward had been £10,000. The Sussex police denied any racial bias.

== Aftermath ==
External videos
- YouTube videos
- Sussex police appeal
- Chapel Road CCTV of two unidentified women, one resembling Gharsallah
- In the Footsteps of Killlers Series 3 Episode 2

The investigation was distinguished by a mutual lack of confidence between the Gharsallah family and the Sussex Police. The police did not welcome the family's parallel investigation. For example, a police spokesman was critical of the family's filmed crime reconstruction of Gharsallah's last movements. The reconstruction showed Gharsallah alive and well in Worthing town centre around 3:30pm on the day of her disappearance. However, CCTV footage of a person resembling her being there is unconfirmed and disputed. The spokesman stated that the reconstruction could therefore be misleading. He argued that there was good quality video of her at the Clifton Food and Wine store so there was little point in staging a reconstruction. The spokesman also argued that an economic and targeted use of police resources was critical, and that there was little point in undertaking searches, excavations and arrests unless prompted by credible evidence. Gharsallah's fate remains unknown. In 2025 the case was the subject of Series 3 episode 2 of In the Footsteps of Killers on Channel 4.

== See also ==
- List of people who disappeared mysteriously: post-1970
- Disappearance of Claudia Lawrence – Unsolved 2009 disappearance of 35-year-old woman from York, England
- Disappearance of Suzy Lamplugh – 1986 disappearance of woman in London
