= George Lopez Why You Crying? =

George Lopez Why You Crying? is a 2004 stand-up comedy film starring George Lopez. It was recorded February 2004 at the Terrace Theater in Long Beach, California. An hour long, the film aired on Showtime on May 29, 2004. It was executive produced by Lopez, Ron DeBlasio, Kimber Rickabaugh, and Paul Miller. RickMill Production was the special's production company.

The show takes its name from his maternal grandmother who said to him "Why you crying?" after she hit his ears and psychologically wore him down. The DVD version was released in September 2005 and had additional content including a Lopez interview and English and Spanish subtitles.

== Reception ==
Ray Richmond, a television critic for The Hollywood Reporter, penned a mixed review of the special. He liked that Lopez has a "genuine stage presence", is "relaxed and confident", and "does a better-than-average white guy impression". But the reviewer found that there was "too little [material] strking a truly universal chord" and thought Lopez "relies too often on easy stereotypes rather than pushing the comedic envelope". According to William Larue of The Post-Standard, the show has "funny recollections and observations about Mexican-American culture, family relationships, drinking and language".

The Deseret News reviewer Chris Hicks praised Lopez for being "pretty funny with observations on everyday life" and for his "particular insight into the Latino community" but did not like how many "four-letter words" there were which he found "tiresome". David Kronke of the Los Angeles Daily News called the show "funny, if familiar stuff", while Bill Griffith of The Boston Globe found it to be "great TV material" that "hits you so hard you'll gasp". At its 11th yearly Vision Awards, the National Association for Multi-ethnicity in Communications (NAMIC) gave the special a best comedy nomination.
