= Garagouz =

Garagouz (The Puppeteer)
- Directed by: Abdenour Zahzah
- Written by: Abdenour Zahzah
- Screenplay by: Abdenour Zahzah
- Produced by: Yacine Laloui
- Starring: Mahmed Irki Farouk Irki Youcef Abbas Tahar Benayachi
- Cinematography: Sofian El Fani
- Edited by: Franssou Prenant
- Music by: Toti Basso
- Release date: 2010
- Running time: 22'
- Country: Algeria
- Language: Arabic

Garagouz is a 2010 film.

== Synopsis ==
Mokhtar earns his living as a puppeteer, aided by his son who is learning the job. Using his old van, he goes to schools scattered all over the Algerian countryside, encountering prejudice and obstacles on the way.

== Awards ==
- Dubai 2010
- Cinemed 2010
- Fespaco 2011
- Milan 2011
- Busan 2011
- Limassol 2011
- Saguenay 2011
- Ischia 2011
