= Gaza: Still Alive =

- Directed by: Harry Fear
- Starring: Harry Fear; Hasan Zeyada
- Narrated by: Harry Fear
- Original language: English

Production
- Cinematography: Sam Henderson; Sami Shehada
- Running time: 53 min

Original release
- Network: RT (TV network)
- Release: 28 June 2019

Gaza: Still Alive is a 2019 RT (TV network) documentary film, written and narrated by Harry Fear. The film revisits people who experienced the 2014 war, following up on how they’re coping physically and mentally. It revealed an unseen mental health catastrophe among Palestinians in the Gaza Strip after a decade of isolation from the world and amid ongoing war trauma.

== Content ==
The British journalist Harry Fear returns to Gaza in 2019 to see how civilians he had met during the 2014 war are coping with ongoing trauma. The documentary is told through the voices of ordinary Gazans and the psychologists struggling to support them. It focuses on invisible suffering: trauma, anxiety, PTSD, especially among children, and what “living under siege” does to everyday life. Fear interviews several children, psychologists, and doctors affected by Israel and Egypt's blockade of Gaza.

The documentary presents a broader humanitarian and socioeconomic conditions of the Gaza Strip, a territory of around 2 million residents, nearly 67% of whom are registered Palestinian refugees. Since 2007, Gaza has been under an Israeli–Egyptian blockade, described by Israel as a security measure targeting Hamas, while the United Nations has characterised it as a form of collective punishment. The film examines life under these conditions, including widespread poverty and youth unemployment estimated at around 60% and the dependence of nearly half the population on food assistance, primarily from UNRWA, which faced major U.S. funding cuts in 2018. The documentary also situates personal stories within the aftermath of repeated armed conflicts. Gaza has experienced three major wars since 2008, with the 2014 conflict damaging or destroying more than 18,000 homes, including several UN-run shelters hit by shelling. Research cited in relation to the film highlights the psychological impact of prolonged conflict and restricted movement: peer-reviewed studies report that 66–94% of children in Gaza exhibit symptoms of post-traumatic stress and the World Health Organization has warned that chronic insecurity and lack of opportunity contribute to severe long-term mental-health burdens in the territory. Events depicted or referenced in the documentary also unfold amid the 2018–2019 Great March of Return protests, during which Gaza’s health authorities report that over 250 Palestinians were killed, and which a 2019 UN Commission of Inquiry said likely involved violations of international human rights and humanitarian law, though Israel maintains they were violent riots threatening border security.

== Reception ==
"The film wisely avoids focusing too much on the blockade itself and an examination of the dysfunctional nature of Palestinian leadership. That in itself is a weighty topic that has been addressed at length in any number of films and documentaries.", wrote John Lyman of IntPolicyDigest.

Gaza: Still Alive was said to "decidedly overlook[...] the politics of Palestinian in-fighting and Israeli occupation. Rather, it focuses on the scars and craters inside ordinary civilians’ minds."; and to capture the deep pain and hardship of ordinary life in Gaza for those who have endured war, loss, trauma, and confinement. The film was mentioned on different news websites.

== Screenings ==
The film was the first film screened in the Voices from the Holy Land online salon, in 2022. The same year it was screened as part of the Saturday Documentary Series of San Jose.

== Awards ==
- 2019 Bronze Independent Short Award (Los Angeles)
- Finalist of the London International Motion Picture Awards in 2019
- 2020 Best Documentary MiraBan UK Film Awards
- 2021 Best Documentary MiraBan UK Film Awards
