= Gai Shanxi and Her Sisters =

2007 film by Ban Zhongyi

Gai Shanxi and her Sisters
- Directed by: Ban Zhongyi
- Distributed by: dGenerate Films
- Release date: 2007
- Running time: 80 minutes
- Country: China
- Languages: Chinese, Japanese, English subtitles

Gai Shanxi and her Sisters (Chinese: 盖山西和她的姐妹们; pinyin: gai shan xi he ta de jie mei men), directed by Ban Zhongyi, is a 2007 independent Chinese documentary about a Chinese woman's ordeal as a "comfort woman" for the Japanese Army during World War II.

Zhongyi also wrote a related book of the same name.

== Plot ==
Li Dong‘e is a young woman living in a village in Yu County, Shanxi province during the Sino-Japanese War. Because of her beauty she was nicknamed "Gai Shanxi" ("The most beautiful in whole Shanxi Province). In 1941 she and other women from her village are captured by Japanese soldiers. The women are taken to a Japanese stronghold, raped and used as sex slaves.

Gai Shanxi twice rescues other women by offering herself to the Japanese. The continual rapes damage her both physically and mentally. After the war she is shunned by her husband and the villagers and commits suicide.

== Festivals ==
The film was shown at the Amnesty International Film Festival and the Yunnan Multi Culture Visual Festival (YUNFEST).

== Bibliography ==
- Cheng, Jim (20 June 2015). "Chinese Independent Films from 1987-2013". C.V. Starr East Asian Library, Columbia University. doi:10.7916/D89S20K4.
- Chu, Yingchi (2007). Chinese Documentaries: From Dogma to Polyphony. Routledge. ISBN 978-1-134-18603-7.
- Kimura, Maki (2016). Unfolding the 'Comfort Women' Debates: Modernity, Violence, Women's Voices. Springer. ISBN 978-1-137-39251-0.
- Nishino, Rumiko; Kim, Puja; Onozawa, Akane, eds. (2018). Denying the Comfort Women: The Japanese State's Assault on Historical Truth. Routledge. ISBN 978-1-351-69063-8.
- Warner, Judith Ann (2012). Women and Crime: A Reference Handbook. ABC-CLIO. ISBN 978-1-59884-424-5.
- Yukinori, Shibata (15 April 2007). "Book Review Gai Shanxi And Her Sisters". www.jesuitsocialcenter-tokyo.com. Jesuit Social Center, Tokyo. Archived from the original on 7 December 2019.
