= Gambia: Take Me to Learn My Roots =

2019 British–Gambian Documentary

- Directed by: Bacary Bax
- Written by: Bacary Bax; Susan Lister
- Cinematography: Christopher Fenton
- Edited by: Bacary Bax; Lans Lister; Cam Pexton
- Music by: Endoflevelbaddie; Lans Lister; Bud Sugar
- Distributed by: Vibe Tribe
- Release date: 16 May 2019 (UK)
- Running time: 104 min.
- Country: Sudan
- Language: English
- Budget: GBP 10,000

Gambia: Take Me to Learn My Roots, is a 2019 British–Gambian documentary film directed by Bacary Bax and produced by Bud Sugar. The film is about a single mother who wants to teach her mixed-race sons about their West African roots.

The film was shot in both England (Kingston upon Hull, East Riding of Yorkshire) and The Gambian (Brikama) locations. The film received positive reviews from critics.

== Cast ==
- Bacary Bax
- Stan Hill
- Lans Lister
- Rob Mills
- Wes Eluda
- Luncher Jatta
- Jatta Kunda
- Susan Lister
