= GG Bond: Guarding =

- Poster
- Chinese: 猪猪侠之英雄猪少年
- Directed by: Lu Jinming; Zhong Yu
- Based on: GG Bond
- Production companies: Guangdong Yongsheng Animation; Le Vision Pictures (Beijing); Hu Na Kuai Le Yang Guang Hu Dong Yu Le Media; Shenzhen Jiaqi Entertainment; Shenzhen Weibian Technology Development
- Distributed by: Le Vision Pictures (Beijing)
- Release date: 7 January 2017
- Running time: 91 minutes
- Country: China
- Language: Mandarin
- Box office: CN¥30 million

GG Bond: Guarding (simplified Chinese: 猪猪侠之英雄猪少年; traditional Chinese: 豬豬俠之英雄豬少年) is a 2017 Chinese computer-animated fantasy adventure comedy film directed by Lu Jinming and Zhong Yu. The film is part of the GG Bond film series, following 2015's GG Bond Movie: Ultimate Battle. It was released in China by Le Vision Pictures on 7 January 2017.

== Plot ==
The legendary G-Watch has the magical power to protect the world. However, it chooses GG Bond as its master, who is regarded as nobody by everyone. Just at that time, Mysterio shows up, aiming to destroy all G-Watches. GG Bond fights against Mysterio fearlessly with his wit and courage, but finds that Mysterio is the grown-up himself coming from the future world!

== Cast ==
- Jackson Yee
- Chen Yi
- Zhang Zikun
- Rong Yan
- Zhuang Chengsong
- Li Taicheng
- Liu Qingyang
- Chan Chi Wing

== Reception ==
The film has grossed CN¥30 million in China.
