= A Ghost and the Boy with a Box on His Head =

A Ghost and the Boy [with a Box on His Head]
- Official poster
- Directed by: Philip Blue
- Written by: Philip Blue
- Produced by: Heather Lynn
- Cinematography: Philip Blue
- Production company: Blue Line Pictures
- Distributed by: The Orchard
- Release date: September 19, 2015 (Toronto)

A Ghost and the Boy [with a Box on His Head] is a 2017 independent drama film written and directed by Philip Blue. The film received 35 awards in film festivals. The film was released in partnership with The Orchard.

== Release and reception ==
For A Ghost and the Boy [with a Box on His Head], Philip Blue won Talented New Director 2015 at the International Film Fest Filmmaker Awards in St. Tropez. At the International Movie Awards in 2015, the film won Gold Awards for Feature Film, Directing, Cinematography, Editing, and Sound. Blue received the Best Risk Taker Award at the 2015 Columbia Gorge International Film Festival. A Ghost and the Boy also won Best Narrative Feature at the 2015 Frozen Film Festival in Minnesota.

The film appeared on Netflix in May 2017, and iTunes, Amazon, Google Play, Vudu, and other VOD platforms on May 9, 2017.
