= Geharha: The Dark and Long Haired Monster =

2009 Television film directed by Kiyotaka Taguchi

- Film's poster
- Written by: Maya Nemoto
- Screenplay by: Jun Miura
- Directed by: Kiyotaka Taguchi
- Starring: Kanji Tsuda; Mark Chinnery; Mina Fujii; Kazuhiro Yoshida
- Music by: Akira Ifukube (stock)
- Country of origin: Japan
- Original language: Japanese

Production
- Producers: Takuyuki Matsuno; Shinji Higuchi
- Cinematography: Satoshi Murakawa
- Editor: Atsuki Sato
- Running time: 20 minutes
- Production company: NHK Productions

Original release
- Release: February 24, 2009

Geharha: The Dark and Long Haired Monster (Japanese: 長髪大怪獣ゲハラ, Hepburn: Chōhatsu Daikaijū Gehara; lit. 'Giant Long Haired Monster Geharha') is a 2009 Japanese made-for-television short kaiju film directed by Kiyotaka Taguchi. The film stars Kanji Tsuda, Mark Chinnery, Mina Fujii and Kazuhiro Yoshida as Geharha.

== Plot ==
A gigantic, hairy monster attacks a fishing boat at sea. Dr Murakami suspects that the only survivor of the assault, who has lost all his hair, may be a Keukegen spectre, a shaggy supernatural creature based on Japanese folklore. Hideo Akihara discovers several worshippers and learns that an ancient seal containing the monster has been broken after hearing the announcement at a forest shrine dedicated to the Keukegen Geharha.

While Hideo continues his investigation, Geharha strikes a number of locations in Ishikawa Prefecture, gradually closing in on Kanazawa, the capital. While the Japanese Self Defense Force moves into the city to confront the monster, civilians are evacuated. Geharha's long hair cushions the blows of the armed forces when they attack with tanks and guns. The few wounds that the creature does receive emit a noxious gas that quickly overwhelms the military, forcing the JSDF commander to call for a retreat. A foreign consultant offers a new superweapon to use against Geharha... the Gas Vortical Device "Fujin".

== Cast ==
- Kanji Tsuda as Fisherman Kubo
- Jiji-Boo as Doctor
- Kazuhiro Yoshida as Geharha
- Ken Osawa as Hideo Hagiwara
- Mina Fujii as Momoko Hagiwara
- Mark Chinery as Dr. Anderson
- Wakana Matsumoto as Signalman
- Keisaku Kimura as Signalman
- Mitsuko Oka as Tsuruko Hagiwara
- Shiro Sano as Dr. Murakami
- Tomorowo Taguchi as Shinto priest
- Kanji Tsuda as Fisherman Kubo
- Hiroyuki Watanabe as JSDF commander
- Pierre Taki as Tank Corps captain
- Terry Ito as Alien
- Akane Oshawa
- Yuri Morishita
- Yukihide Benny

== Home media ==
On September 30, 2009, King Records released the director's cut on DVD and Blu-ray in Japan.
