= Ghost Bird =

2009 documentary film

- Ghost Bird's theatrical release poster
- Directed by: Scott Crocker
- Produced by: Scott Crocker
- Production company: Small Change Productions Inc.
- Release date: 2009
- Running time: 85 mins
- Country: United States
- Language: English

Ghost Bird is a 2009 documentary film centered on the small town of Brinkley in Arkansas, United States. It deals with the ivory-billed woodpecker, a species that is possibly extinct but whose continued existence remains highly debated.

== Synopsis ==
After a birdwatcher videotaped a white-winged bird believed to be the Ivory-billed woodpecker, many birdwatchers came to visit Brinkley to see it for themselves. In February 2004, woodpecker gift shops opened in Brinkley. Filmmaker Scott Crocker gives a detailed look at each side of the argument in Brinkley, with interviews from both the locals and the tourists.

== Critical reception ==
Ghost Bird has received highly positive critical reception from all around North America. In 2010, The New York Times called it a "multilayered story that will fascinate practically everyone" and a "witty, wistful documentary". On Rotten Tomatoes it has a rating of 91% based on 11 reviews, and was selected at the 2009 Hot Docs International Film Festival.
