= The God of Wealth =

2020 Malaysian Chinese-language comedy film

- Directed by: Jon Art
- Starring: Eddy Ko; Jacky Kam; Frost Yaw; James Wong; Benny Sii Tuong Kai; PB Kuang
- Distributed by: Mega Films Distribution
- Release date: 25 January 2020 (Malaysia)
- Running time: 83 minutes
- Country: Malaysia
- Languages: Mandarin; Cantonese

The God of Wealth (Chinese: 大财神) is a 2020 Malaysian Chinese-language comedy film. In the film, three bad guys from the sea bring chaos to a small, peaceful fishing village, and the God of Wealth is sent down from heaven to save the village and restore peace.

The film was released on 25 January 2020 in Malaysia. It was one of four 2020 Malaysian Chinese New Year films, along with A Moment of Happiness, Fight Lah! Kopitiam, and Good Wealth 2020.

== Synopsis ==
Long time ago, there is a peaceful fishing village called Batu Village. But one day, a big wave washed up the coast and brought three guys ashore, Lai, Haha and Mao Mao. They are saved by a kind elderly couple. Instead of repaying them with good deeds, these three wicked "Lai Ha Mao" do much harm to the village, even pretending to be fortune tellers. So, the Heaven has sent down the God of Wealth to go under cover as a human to save the village. Can he save the village and bring back peace?

== Cast ==
- Eddy Ko
- Jacky Kam
- Frost Yaw
- Freddie Wong
- Eliza Wong
- James Wong
- Benny Sii Tuong Kai

== Production ==
Filming took place in Bagan Sungai Lima and Batu Pahat in Malaysia. Actor Gan Jiaqi was initially nervous to shoot his scenes, as he worried that he was not fit enough to look good in a scene where his character fell naked from the sky, and followed a strict diet regimen for the part.
