= Ghosts of Our Forest =

- Directed by: Daniel Roher
- Produced by: Daniel Roher, Isis Essery, Lisa Trogisch
- Cinematography: Marianna Margaret
- Edited by: Richard Jay (Music), Zoe Gordon (Sound) Edmund Stenson (picture)
- Music by: Richard Jay, Zoe Gordon
- Release date: February 20, 2017

Ghosts of Our Forest is a 2017 documentary about the removal of the Batwa people by the Government of Uganda in 1992. It follows the survivors reconciling with their heritage.

== Release ==
Ghosts of Our Forest premiered on February 20, 2017, at the Big Sky Documentary Film Festival.

== Reception ==
P. Judkins Wellington reviewed Ghosts of Our Forest for Ethnomusicology, stating that it was "not an explicitly ethnomusicological film, but its interrelated themes of cultural preservation, human rights, and political struggle are salient to ethnomusicologists writ large." Library Journal also rated the film favorably.
