= The Goal (2023 film) =

2023 Namibian film

- Directed by: Lavinia Kapewasha
- Starring: Ngunde Maziengo, Otja Kooper, Adriano Paulus, Mikiros Garoes
- Release date: 2023
- Country: Namibia
- Language: English

The Goal is a 2023 Namibian film, directed by Lavinia Kapewasha and written by Jenny Kandenge. It follows a young girl from an underprivileged background who has the desire to secure a spot in the Namibian football team.

== Aired ==
The Goal is film premiered on KykNET and DSTV.

== Cast ==
- Otja Kooper
- Ngunde Maziengo
- Andriano Paulus
- Mikoros Garoes
- Hazel Hind-a
- Mervin Uahupirapi
