= Golden Apples of the Sun (film) =

- DVD Cover featuring alternative title
- Directed by: Barrie McLean; Kristen Weingartner
- Written by: Barrie McLean; Kristen Weingartner
- Produced by: Barrie McLean; John Ross; Kristen Weingartner
- Starring: Elizabeth Suzuki; Percy Harkness; Leon Morenzie; Derek Lamb
- Cinematography: Roger Moride
- Edited by: Barrie McLean; Kristen Weingartner
- Music by: Galt MacDermot
- Distributed by: Cine Qua Non Films; New World Pictures
- Release date: 6 June 1973
- Running time: 86 mins
- Country: Canada
- Language: English

Golden Apples of the Sun (also known as Caged Terror and Ever After All) is a 1973 independent Canadian film. It was directed by NFB-trained directors Barrie McLean and Kristen Weingartner, who also produced, wrote and edited the film. The film stars Elizabeth Suzuki and Percy Harkness.

== Synopsis ==
An office worker named Richard decides to invite his co-worker Janet to go on a camping trip with him to a secluded forest, and she accepts his offer. As soon as they arrive at the forest, Richard begins to show off his woodman's prowess by catching a fish and killing a rabbit. Janet isn't particularly impressed, but still she lets him rip her clothes off and throw her into the lake, where they frolic for a while before coming ashore to make love, during which Richard inexplicably smears blood all over her. As they continue their journey, they talk about their lives, the beauty and cruelty of nature, and make allusions to classical literature.

Janet and Richard arrive at the cabin, that Richard knew about, they enjoy a picnic, while Janet had some insights about her life and begins to weep. Almost an hour of talking, two strange and suspicious men, Jarvis and the Troubadour, show up at the cabin to sing hippy folk songs to the travelers. The two men begin to torture Janet and Richard, they rape Janet and put her in an ice box and imprison Richard in a chicken coop to watch them finish the job. What is strange by the ending is that Richard wakes in the morning, still caged in the chicken coop, to see Janet saying goodbye to the men as they leave.

== Cast ==
- Elizabeth Suzuki - Janet
- Percy Harkness - Richard
- Leon Morenzie - Jarvis
- Derek Lamb - Troubadour

== Reception ==
Critical reception for the film has been overwhelmingly negative, particularly amongst contemporary reviewers. In a review for the website, Canuxploitarion!, the film has been described as "one of the most insufferable Canadian films of all time, a testament to the indigenous struggle between art and commerce that seems to rip apart many Canadian B-movie productions." For the website, Fantastic Movie Musings and Ramblings, a reviewer commented that "potential viewers should be warned that there’s a whole lot of nothing going on in this one, and that nothing is pretty pretentious."
