= Give Us This Day (1943 film) =

- Directed by: Ken G. Hall
- Produced by: Ken G. Hall
- Production company: Cinesound Productions
- Distributed by: Department of Information
- Release date: 1943
- Running time: 9 minutes
- Country: Australia
- Language: English

Give Us This Day is a 1943 Australian propaganda documentary short film about food rationing from Ken G. Hall.
