= Goutte d'Or (2013 film) =

- Film poster
- Directed by: Christophe Peladan
- Screenplay by: Christophe Peladan
- Produced by: Søren Fleng
- Music by: Les Primitives du Futur
- Distributed by: YouTube
- Release date: February 9, 2013
- Running time: 11 minutes
- Countries: Denmark; France
- Budget: €430,000 (estimated)

Goutte d'Or (English: A Drop of Gold) is a 2013 French short film written and directed by Christophe Peladan. It was released onto YouTube on February 6, 2013, and received more than 3,000,000 views. The film tells the story of a dead pirate who falls for a beautiful queen.

== Synopsis ==
As a pirate enters the Kingdom of the Dead he encounters its beautiful Queen. She captures his heart, but hers is not so easily won.

== Awards ==
The film was nominated for Best Short Fiction/Animation at the 2014 Robert Festival.
