= Gharsallah, la semence de Dieu =

- Directed by: Kamel Laaridhi
- Screenplay by: Kamel Laaridhi
- Produced by: Gsara
- Cinematography: Kamel Laaridhi
- Edited by: Nadia Touijer
- Release date: 2007
- Running time: 56 minutes
- Countries: Belgium; Tunisia

Gharsallah, la semence de Dieu is a 2007 documentary film.

== Synopsis ==
At the beginning of the 19th century, a man called Gharsallah dies and is buried in a mausoleum in the village of Dhibet, in the center of Tunisia. The film tries to evoke how Gharsallah affected other lives: Was he Saint? A madman? Possessed? Unjust? The story of a man that marked everything around him, even dreams.
