= GG Bond Movie: Ultimate Battle =

- Poster
- 猪猪侠之终极决战
- Directed by: Jinming Lu; Jinhui Lu
- Starring: Shuang Lu; Zhirong Chen; Qing Zu; Jingwei Xu; Yi Chen; Ping Wang; Bo Sun
- Production companies: Guangdong Winsing Animation; Toonmax Media; Pearl River Pictures; Guangdong TV Jiajia Cartoon; Beijing Dongfang Huamian Film
- Release date: 10 July 2015
- Running time: 90 minutes
- Country: China
- Language: Mandarin
- Box office: CN¥45.4 million

GG Bond Movie: Ultimate Battle (Chinese: 猪猪侠之终极决战) is a 2015 Chinese animated adventure comedy film directed by Jinming Lu and Jinhui Lu. The film was released on July 10, 2015. The film is part of the GG Bond film series, following GG Bond 2 (2014), and followed by GG Bond: Guarding (2017).

== Voice cast ==
- Shuang Lu
- Zhirong Chen
- Qing Zu
- Jingwei Xu
- Yi Chen
- Ping Wang
- Bo Sun

== Main characters ==
GG Bond, the main character, wears a red suit with a yellow pig snout icon in the middle.

Super Q, the muscular pig with a blue suit with yellow.

Phoebe, The pig with short blond hair and a pink dress and bow.

SDaddy, the one in green and white with a snot out of his nose.

Bobby, the pig in blue and shiny violet sunglasses. Super Q's sidekick.

== Reception ==
The film earned CN¥45.425 million at the Chinese box office.
