= Game (disambiguation) =

A game is a recreational activity with a set of rules.

Game or Games may also refer to:

== People ==
=== People with the surname ===
- Abram Games (1914–1996, London), British graphic designer
- Philip Game (1876–1961), British military leader and Governor of New South Wales, Australia
- William Game (1853–1932), first batsman to score a century for Oxford against Cambridge

=== People with the stagename ===
- The Game (rapper) (born 1979), or Game, an American rapper

== Animals ==
- Game (dog), a quality of fighting dogs that are selectively bred and trained to fight
- Game (hunting), any non-domesticated animal hunted for food or sport

== Arts, entertainment, and media ==
=== Films ===
- Game (1993 film), a Hindi film
- Game (2002 film), a Tamil film
- Game (2003 film), a Japanese film
- Game (2006 film), a Telugu film
- Game (2011 film), an action Hindi-language film
- Game (2014 film), a Bengali film
- Game (2016 film), a Kannada-language film
- Game (2017 film), an American sport drama film
- Games (film), a 1967 film starring James Caan

=== Literature ===
- Game (play), a 2015 British play by Mike Bartlett
- "Game", a short story by Donald Barthelme
- Games, a 1967 novel by Hal Ellson

=== Music ===
==== Groups ====
- Ford & Lopatin, formerly known as Games, an American band

==== Albums ====
- G.A.M.E., a 2006 album by Game
- Game (KHM album), 2002
- Game (Perfume album), 2008
- Game (Flow album), 2004
- Game (Nikolay Baskov album), 2016
- Games (Leo Ku album), 2003
- Games (University of Northern Iowa Jazz Band One album)
- Game, an album by Piano Squall
- Games, an album by Larry Fast
- Games, an EP by Claire, or the title song

==== Songs ====
- "Games" (Chuckii Booker song), 1992
- "Games" (Luke Bryan song), 2015
- "Games" (New Kids on the Block song), 1991
- "Game", a song by BoA from the 2010 album Hurricane Venus
- "Game", a song by Adonxs from the 2022 album Age of Adonxs
- "Game", a song by Ayumi Hamasaki, the B-side of the single Inspire
- "Game", a song by Doja Cat from the 2018 album Amala
- "Game", a song by Jme from the 2015 album Integrity
- "Games", a song by Demi Lovato from the 2017 album Tell Me You Love Me
- "Games", a song by The Strokes from the 2011 album Angles
- "Games", a song by Cher from the 1982 album I Paralyze, later covered by Tina Turner
- "Games", a song by the Jonas Brothers from Jonas Brothers
- "Games", a song by Tessa Violet from the 2019 album Bad Ideas
- "Games", a song by Lennon Stella from the 2020 album Three. Two. One.

=== Periodicals ===
- Games (magazine), an American game and puzzle magazine
- GamesTM, a magazine

=== Television ===
- MBC Game, a defunct South Korean television channel
- "Games" (House), a 2007 episode of House
- "Games" (seaQuest DSV), a 1993 episode of seaQuest DSV
- "Games", a Series G episode of the television series QI (2009)

== Brands and enterprises ==
- Game (British retailer), a major British video game retailer
- Game (South African retailer), a retailer, operated by Massmart (a subsidiary of Wal-Mart)

== Mathematics and science ==
- Game theory, the study of mathematical models of strategic interactions
- Game form, a strategic interaction between individuals in game theory
- Games, a mathematical superset of surreal numbers
- Game, a common counterproductive social interaction in transactional analysis

== Sports ==
- Game, a segment of a pickleball match
- Game, a segment of a tennis match

== Other uses ==
- Game (grape), also known as Gamé, another name for the wine grape Blaufränkisch
- game – The German Games Industry Association
- Georgia Academy of Mathematics, Engineering and Science, an early college entrance program
- Ludi Romani, or Roman Games, a religious festival in ancient Rome
- Mind games, a form of covert psychological influence

== See also ==
- I'm Game (disambiguation)
- Gamble (disambiguation)
- Game Over (disambiguation)
- Gamer (disambiguation)
- Gaming (disambiguation)
- Gaming the system
- Let the Game Begin
- Let the Games Begin (disambiguation)
- Summer Games (disambiguation)
- The Game (disambiguation)
- Video game
- Video Games (disambiguation)
- Winter games (disambiguation)
