= Gamer (disambiguation) =

A gamer is one who plays and/or devises games, especially role-playing or video games.

Gamer(s) may also refer to:

== People ==
- Gambler, a person who gambles
- esports competitor, a person who competes in eSports
- Cheater, a person who cheats (games) the system

Surnamed

- Carlton Gamer (1929–2023), American composer and music theorist

== Film ==
- Gamer (2011 film), a 2011 Ukrainian film
- Gamer (2009 film), a 2009 science fiction thriller
- The Gamers (film), a 2002 low-budget cult film, followed by the sequels, The Gamers: Dorkness Rising and The Gamers: Hands of Fate
- Gamers: The Movie, a 2006 mockumentary

== Television ==
- G@mers (TV series)
- Gamer.tv, a UK video-game programme

== Literature ==
- The Gamer, a Korean comic
- Gamers!, a 2015 Japanese light novel series

== Companies ==
- The Gamers, a wargaming company
- Gamers, a retail chain operated by the Japanese media company Broccoli
- TheGamer, a video game website owned by the Canadian digital media company Valnet

== Music ==
- Gamer (album), 2026 album by CG5
- Gamers (album), a 1996 album by The Conscious Daughters

== See also ==
- Game (disambiguation)
- Gaming (disambiguation)
- Gambling (disambiguation)
