= Gamble (disambiguation) =

To gamble is to participate in gambling.

Gamble may also refer to:

== Places in the United States ==
- Gamble Township, Lycoming County, Pennsylvania
- Gamble Creek, a stream in Florida
- Gamble Run, a stream in West Virginia
- Gamble Field, a former outdoor sports stadium on the campus of the University of Colorado in Boulder
- Gamble Sands, a golf course and resort in Brewster, Washington

== People ==
- Gamble (surname)
- Gamble Rogers (1937–1991), American folk artist musician and storyteller

== Other uses ==
- USS Gamble, a United States Navy destroyer
- Gamble Montessori High School, Cincinnati, Ohio, United States, a public high school
- Gamble baronets, a title in the Baronetage of the United Kingdom
- "Gamble", a song by Shiina Ringo from Ze-Chyou Syuu

== See also ==
- Gamble House (disambiguation), various historic houses in the United States
- Gamble Mill, Bellefonte, Pennsylvania, United States, a grist mill on the National Register of Historic Places
- Gamble-Skogmo, an American business conglomerate
- The Gamble (disambiguation)
- Gambles (disambiguation)
- The Gambler (disambiguation), including uses of Gambler
- The Gamblers (disambiguation)
- Gambling (disambiguation)
