= OLG =

The acronym OLG may refer to:

- Oberlandesgericht, a higher regional court of appeals in Germany
- Online gaming
- Ontario Lottery and Gaming Corporation, a Canadian provincial government agency which operates lottery games and casinos.
- Our Lady of Guadalupe
- Overlapping gene in genomes
- Overlapping generations in population genetics
- Overlapping generations model in economics
