= Sociality =

Form of collective animal behaviour

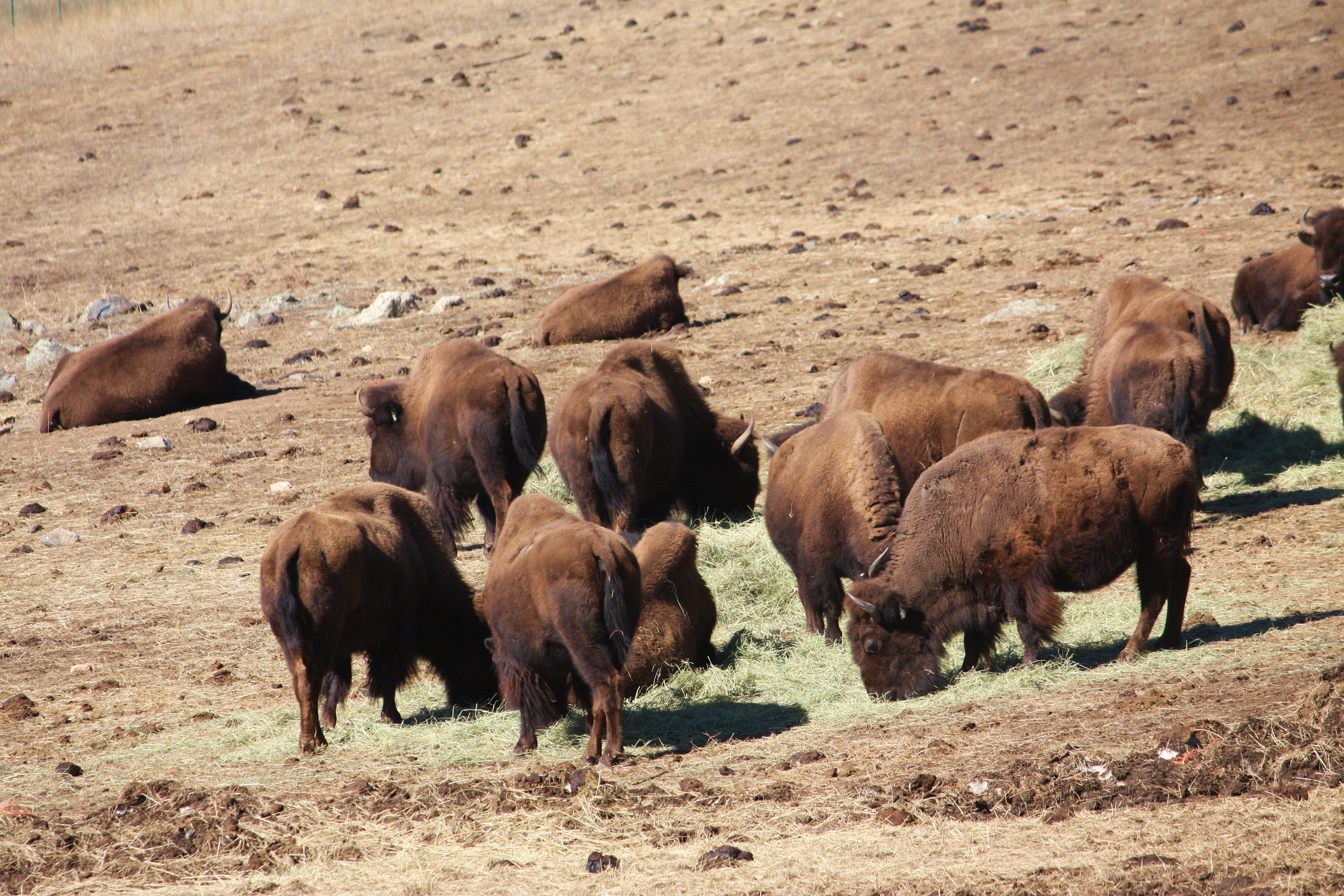
Herd of American bison at Genesee Park

Sociality is the degree to which individuals in an animal population tend to associate in social groups (for which, the desire or inclination is known as gregariousness) and form cooperative societies.

Sociality is a survival response to evolutionary pressures. For example, when a mother wasp stays near her larvae in the nest, parasites are less likely to eat the larvae. Biologists suspect that pressures from parasites and other predators selected this behavior in wasps of the family Vespidae.

This wasp behaviour demonstrates the most fundamental characteristic of animal sociality: parental investment. Parental investment is any expenditure of resources (time, energy, social capital) to benefit one's offspring. Parental investment detracts from a parent's capacity to invest in future reproduction and aid to kin (including other offspring). An animal that cares for its young but shows no other sociality traits is said to be subsocial.

An animal that exhibits a high degree of sociality is called a social animal. The highest degree of sociality recognized by sociobiologists is eusociality. A eusocial taxon is one that exhibits overlapping adult generations, reproductive division of labor, cooperative care of young, and—in the most refined cases—a biological caste system.

One characteristic of social animals is the relatively high degree of cognitive ability. Social mammal predators such as spotted hyenas and lions have been found to be better than non-social predators such as leopards and tigers at solving problems that require the use of innovation.

== Presociality ==
Solitary animals such as the jaguar do not associate except for courtship and mating. If an animal taxon shows a degree of sociality beyond courtship and mating, but lacks any of the characteristics of eusociality, it is said to be presocial. Although presocial species are much more common than eusocial species, eusocial species have disproportionately large populations.

The entomologist Charles D. Michener published a classification system for presociality in 1969, building on the earlier work of Suzanne Batra (who coined the words eusocial and quasisocial in 1966). Michener used these terms in his study of bees, but also saw a need for additional classifications: subsocial, communal, and semisocial. In his use of these words, he did not generalize beyond insects. E. O. Wilson later refined Batra's definition of quasisocial.

=== Subsociality ===
Subsociality is common in the animal kingdom. In subsocial taxa, parents care for their young for some length of time. Even if the period of care is very short, the animal is still described as subsocial. If adult animals associate with other adults, they are not called subsocial, but are ranked in some other classification according to their social behaviours. If occasionally associating or nesting with other adults is a taxon's most social behaviour, then members of those populations are said to be solitary but social. Wilson (1971), Choe & Crespi (1997) and Costa (2006) discuss subsociality.

Subsociality is widely distributed among the winged insects, and has evolved independently many times. Insect groups that contain at least some subsocial species are shown in bold italics on a phylogenetic tree of the Neoptera (note that many non-subsocial groups are omitted):

- Neoptera
  - - - Idioprothoraca
        **Embioptera** (webspinners)
      - Rhipineoptera
        - Dictyoptera
          - **Blattodea** (cockroaches, inc. eusocial termites)
          - Mantodea (mantises)
        - - **Orthoptera** (grasshoppers, crickets)
          - **Dermaptera** (earwigs)
    - Eumetabola
      - Parametabola
        - **Zoraptera** (angel insects)
        - Paraneoptera
          - Condylognatha
            - **Thysanoptera** (thrips)
            - **Hemiptera** (bugs) many families
              - **Membracidae** (treehoppers, thorn bugs)
              - - **Pentatomidae** (shield bugs)
                - - **Reduviidae** (predatory bugs)
                  - **Tingidae** (lace bugs)
          - **Psocoptera** (bark lice)
      - Endopterygota
        - - **Coleoptera**
            - - - **Staphylinidae** (rove beetles)
                - **Silphidae** (carrion beetles)
              - - **Passalidae** (bessbugs)
                - Scarabaeidae (scarabs)
            - - **Tenebrionidae** (leaf/flower beetles)
              - - **Erotylidae** (pleasing fungus beetles)
                - **Chrysomelidae** (leaf beetles)
          - Neuropteroidea
            - Raphidioptera (snakeflies)
            - Neuroptera (lacewings, alderflies, and allies)
        - - - Antliophora (true flies, scorpionflies, fleas)
            - - Trichoptera (caddisflies)
              - **Lepidoptera** (butterflies and moths)
          - **Hymenoptera** (sawflies, wasps, ants, bees) (apart from eusocial species)

=== Solitary but social ===
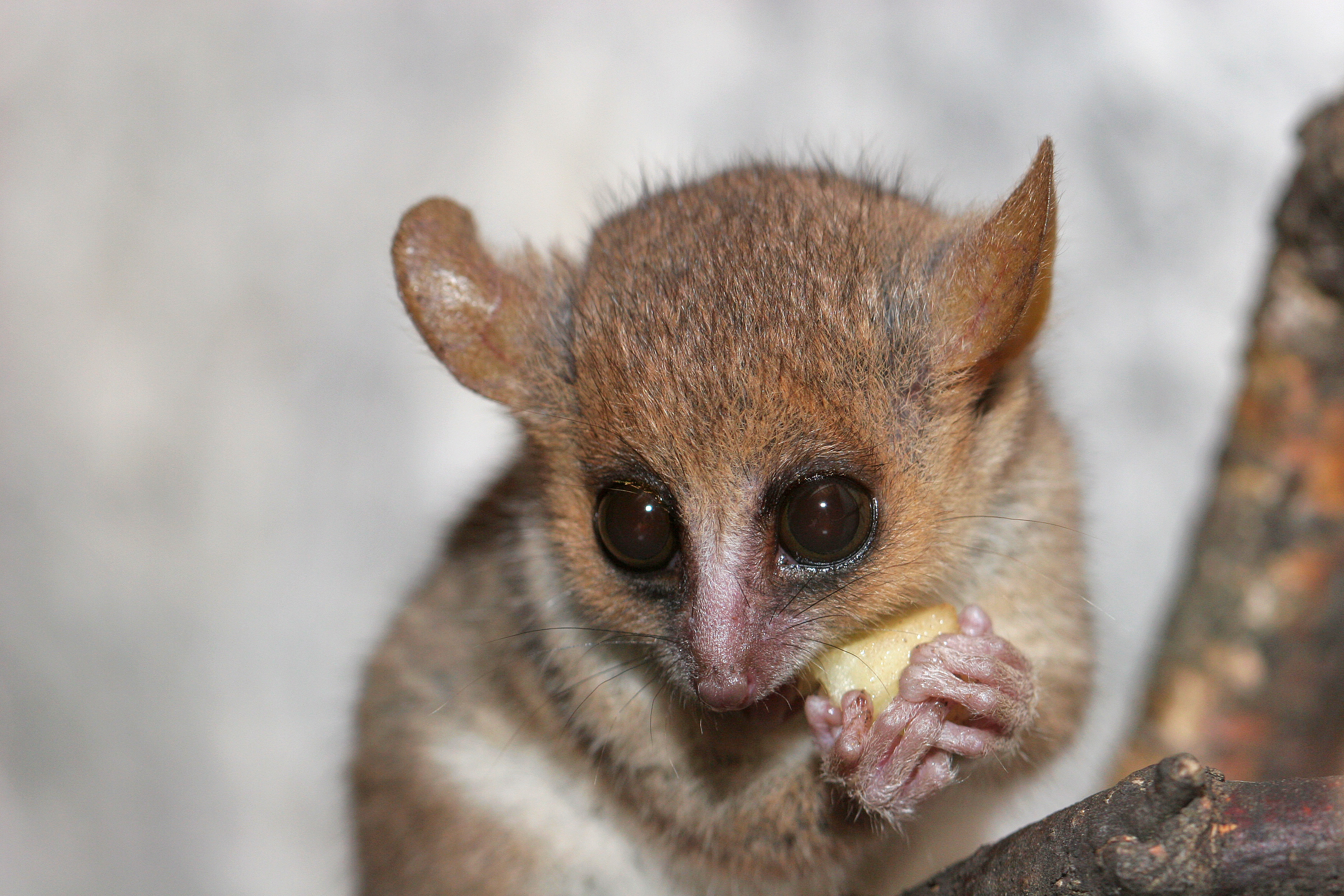
The mouse lemur is a nocturnal, solitary-but-social lemur native to Madagascar.

Solitary-but-social animals forage separately, but some individuals sleep in the same location or share nests. The home ranges of females usually overlap, whereas those of males do not. Males usually do not associate with other males, and male offspring are usually evicted upon maturity. However, this is opposite among cassowaries, for example. Among primates, this form of social organization is most common among the nocturnal strepsirrhine species and tarsiers. Solitary-but-social species include mouse lemurs, lorises, and orangutans.

Some individual cetaceans adopt a solitary but social behavior, that is, they live apart from their own species but interact with humans. This behavior has been observed in species including bottlenose dolphin, common dolphin, striped dolphin, beluga, Risso's dolphin, and orca. Notable individuals include Pelorus Jack (1888–1912), Tião (1994–1995), and Fungie (1983–2020). At least 32 solitary-sociable dolphins were recorded between 2008 and 2019.

=== Parasociality ===
Sociobiologists place communal, quasisocial, and semisocial animals into a meta-class: the parasocial. The two commonalities of parasocial taxa are the exhibition of parental investment, and socialization in a single, cooperative dwelling.

Communal, quasisocial, and semisocial groups differ in a few ways. In a communal group, adults cohabit in a single nest site, but they each care for their own young. Quasisocial animals cohabit, but they also share the responsibilities of brood care. (This has been observed in some Hymenoptera and spider taxa, as well as in some other invertebrates.) A semisocial population has the features of communal and quasisocial populations, but they also have a biological caste system that delegates labor according to whether or not an individual is able to reproduce.

Beyond parasociality is eusociality. Eusocial insect societies have all the characteristics of a semisocial one, except overlapping generations of adults cohabit and share in the care of young. This means that more than one adult generation is alive at the same time, and that the older generations also care for the newest offspring.

== Eusociality ==
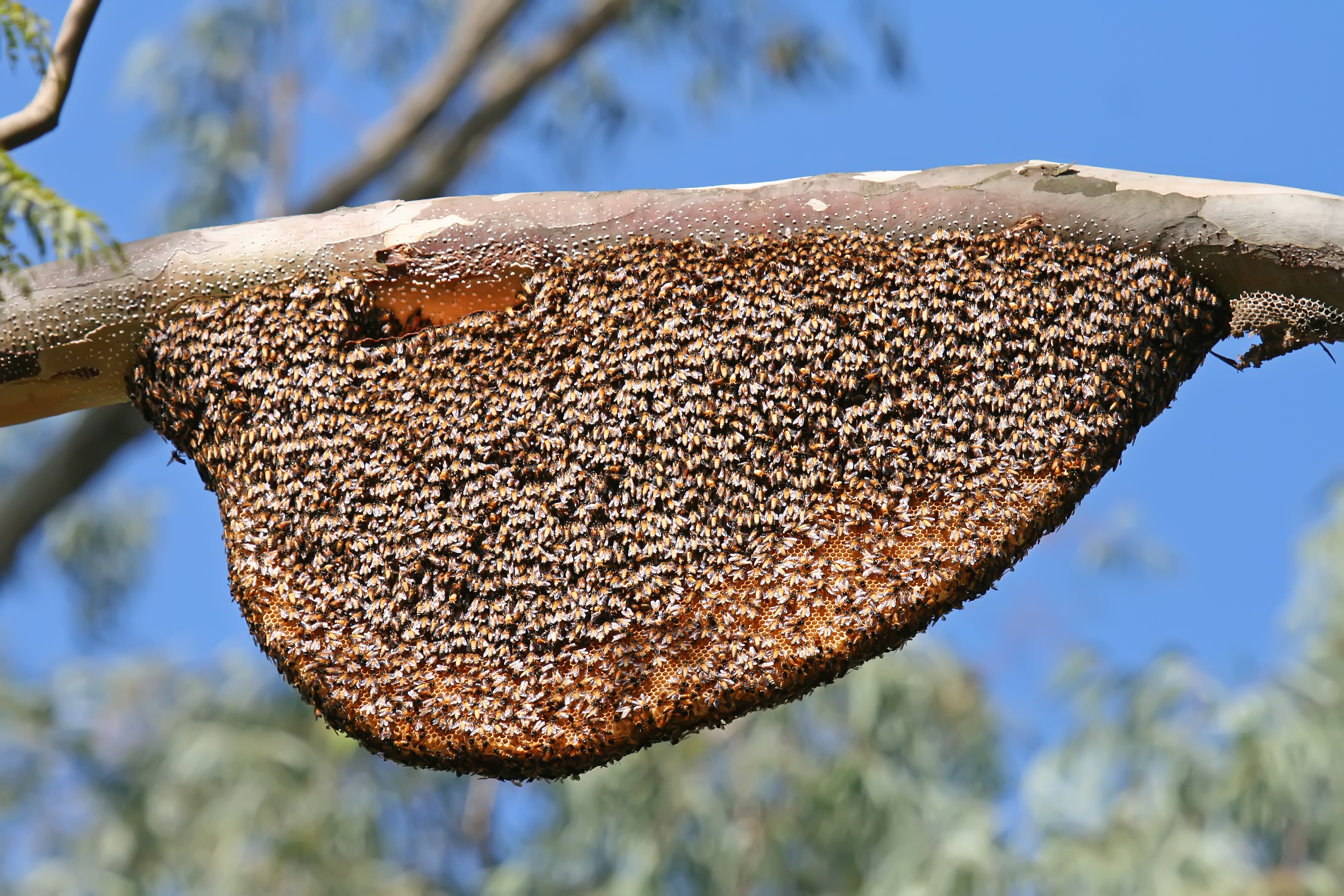
Giant honey bees cover the honeycomb of their nest.

Eusocial societies have overlapping adult generations, cooperative care of young, and division of reproductive labor. When organisms in a species are born with physical characteristics specific to a caste which never changes throughout their lives, this exemplifies the highest acknowledged degree of sociality. Eusociality has evolved in several orders of insects. Common examples of eusociality are from Hymenoptera (ants, bees, sawflies, and wasps) and Blattodea (infraorder Isoptera, termites), but some Coleoptera (such as the beetle Austroplatypus incompertus), Hemiptera (bugs such as Pemphigus spyrothecae), and Thysanoptera (thrips) are described as eusocial. Eusocial species that lack this criterion of morphological caste differentiation are said to be primitively eusocial.

Two potential examples of primitively eusocial mammals are the naked mole-rat and the Damaraland mole-rat (Heterocephalus glaber and Fukomys damarensis, respectively). Both species are diploid and highly inbred, and they aid in raising their siblings and relatives, all of whom are born from a single reproductive queen; they usually live in harsh or limiting environments. A study conducted by O'Riain and Faulkes in 2008 suggests that, due to regular inbreeding avoidance, mole rats sometimes outbreed and establish new colonies when resources are sufficient.

Eusociality has arisen among some crustaceans that live in groups in a restricted area. Synalpheus regalis are snapping shrimp that rely on fortress defense. They live in groups of closely related individuals, amidst tropical reefs and sponges. Each group has one breeding female; she is protected by a large number of male defenders who are armed with enlarged snapping claws. As with other eusocial societies, there is a single shared living space for the colony members, and the non-breeding members act to defend it.

It remains debated whether a species needs to have an irreversibly sterile caste to be considered "eusocial". In such a narrowed definition, the two mammals mentioned above as well as humans cannot be considered eusocial.

=== Human eusociality ===
E. O. Wilson and Bert Hölldobler controversially claimed in 2005 that humans exhibit sufficient sociality to be counted as a eusocial species.

== See also ==
- Aggregation (ethology)
- Collectivism and individualism
- Dominance hierarchy
- Group cohesiveness
- Group selection
- Individualism
- Interdependence
- Nesting instinct
- Prosocial behavior
- Reciprocal altruism
- Social behavior
- Stigmergy
