= The Gambler =

The Gambler may refer to:

- Gambler, a person who gambles

== Film and television ==
=== Films ===
- The Gambler (1919 film), a German silent film
- The Gambler (1938 film), a German film
- The Gambler (1947 film), an Argentine film directed by León Klimovsky
- The Gambler (1958 film), a French-Italian film
- Gambler (film), a 1971 Indian Bollywood film directed by Amarjeet
- The Gambler (1974 film), an American film starring James Caan and Paul Sorvino
- The Gambler (film series), a 1980–1994 American TV movie series starring Kenny Rogers, based on his song "The Gambler"
  - Kenny Rogers as The Gambler, the first film in the series, also known as The Gambler
- The Gambler (1989 film), a Russian film directed by Sergei Bodrov
- The Gambler (1995 film), a Bollywood film directed by Dayal Nihalani
- The Gambler (1997 film), a Dutch-Hungarian-British film about Dostoyevsky writing his novella, directed by Károly Makk
- The Gambler (2013 film), a Lithuanian film directed by Ignas Jonynas
- The Gambler (2014 film), an American remake of the 1974 film
- The Gambler (2019 film), an Indian Malayalam-language superhero film

=== Television episodes ===
- "The Gambler", ALF season 1, episode 23 (1987)
- "The Gambler", Angie season 2, episode 12 (1979)
- "The Gambler", Big Timber season 2, episode 7 (2021)
- "The Gambler", Clipped episode 8 (2015)
- "The Gambler", Colditz series 2, episode 8 (1974)
- "The Gambler", Dead Man's Gun season 1, episode 19 (1998)
- "The Gambler", Echo 3 episode 3 (2022)
- "The Gambler", Family Ties season 3, episode 1 (1984)
- "The Gambler", Festival season 3, episode 4 (1962)
- "The Gambler", Forensic Files season 11, episode 10 (2006)
- "The Gambler", Gold Rush season 7, special 1 (2016)
- "The Gambler", Hardcore Pawn season 5, episode 6 (2011)
- "The Gambler", Hart of Dixie season 2, episode 15 (2013)
- "The Gambler", He-Man and the Masters of the Universe season 2, episode 42 (1984)
- "The Gambler", In the House season 2, episode 3 (1995)
- "The Gambler", King of Kensington season 1, episode 10 (1975)
- "The Gambler", Long Island Medium season 4, episode 5 (2013)
- "The Gambler", Matlock season 2, episode 12 (1987)
- "The Gambler", Pawnography season 1, episode 6 (2014)
- "The Gambler", Spin City season 5, episode 13 (2001)
- "The Gambler", Sue Thomas: F.B.Eye season 2, episode 9 (2004)
- "The Gambler", Tales of Wells Fargo season 3, episode 1 (1958))
- "The Gambler", The Big Easy season 1, episode 7 (1996)
- "The Gambler", The Flintstones season 2, episode 16 (1962)
- "The Gambler", The Life and Legend of Wyatt Earp season 1, episode 7 (1955)
- "The Gambler", The Transformers season 2, episode 31 (1985)
- "The Gambler", Trump: An American Dream episode 2 (2017)

== Literature ==
=== Novels ===
- The Gambler (novel), an 1867 short novel by Fyodor Dostoyevsky
- The Gambler, a 1905 novel by Katherine Cecil Thurston
- The Gambler, a 1924 novel by Max Brand
- The Gambler, a 1937 novel by Anne Meredith
- The Gambler, a 1950 novel by William Krasner
- The Gambler: An Autobiography 1920-1939, a 1973 non-fiction book by Stuart Cloete
- The Gambler, a 1996 novel by Christine Dwyer Hickey
- The Gambler, a 1998 novel by J. R. Roberts
- "The Gambler" (Bacigalupi story), a 2008 novelette by Paolo Bacigalupi
- The Gambler, a. k. a. Tyler O'Neill's Redemption, a 2010 novel by Molly O'Keefe

=== Plays ===
- The Gambler (Betti), a 1950 play by Ugo Betti
- The Gambler (Il giocatore), a 1950 play by Ugo Betti

=== Magazines ===
- Gambler (comics), two DC Comics supervillains
- Gambler (magazine), a 1993–1999 Polish video game monthly

== Music ==
- The Gambler (Prokofiev), a 1917 opera by Prokofiev based on Dostoyevsky's novella
- The Gambler (album), by Kenny Rogers, 1978
  - "The Gambler" (song), the title song
- Gambler (album), a musical by Eric Woolfson, 1996
- The Gambler (EP), by Mike Doughty, 2005
- "Gambler" (song), by Madonna, 1985
- "Gambler", a song by Monsta X from One of a Kind, 2021
- "The Gambler", a song by Fun from Aim and Ignite, 2009
- "The Gambler", a song by Ray Manzarek from The Whole Thing Started with Rock & Roll Now It's Out of Control, 1974

== People ==
- The Gambler (wrestler), Jeffrey Gann, American professional wrestler
- Kenny Rogers (1938–2020), country singer
- Kenny Rogers (baseball) (born 1964)

== Other uses ==
- Gambler (board game), a 1975 Parker Brothers game
- The Gambler (custom car), winner of the 1988 Detroit Autorama Ridler Award

== See also ==
- The Gamblers (disambiguation)
- Gamblerz, a South Korean b-boy crew, formerly known as Gambler Crew
- Gamble (disambiguation)
- The Mississippi Gambler (disambiguation)
- Gamer (disambiguation)
