= Game Over (disambiguation) =

"Game over" is a message often displayed at the end of a video game.

Game Over may also refer to:

== Books ==
- Game Over (Sheff book), a 1993 book about the history of Nintendo by David Sheff
- Game Over: Jerry Sandusky, Penn State, and the Culture of Silence a 2012 book by Bill Moushey and Bob Dvorchak
- Game Over: How You Can Prosper in a Shattered Economy, a 2009 nonfiction book by Stephen Leeb
- Daniel X: Game Over, the fourth book in James Patterson's Daniel X novel series

== Film ==
- Atari: Game Over, a 2014 documentary about the 1983 Atari video game burial
- Deadly Games (1989 film), a French horror film also known as Game Over
- Game Over (2003 film), an American television film
- Game Over (2013 film), an Iranian animated short film
- Game Over (2019 film), an Indian Tamil/Telugu bilingual film
- Game Over: Kasparov and the Machine, a 2003 chess documentary
- Spy Kids 3-D: Game Over, the 2003 third film of the Spy Kids trilogy

== Music ==
=== Albums ===
- Game Over (Nuclear Assault album), 1986
- Game Over (P-Square album) or the title song, 2007
- Game Over (EP) or the title song, by Dave, 2017
- Game Over, by Blanco and The Jacka, 2013
- Game Over, by Ska-P, 2018
- Game Over, by Tempo, 1999

=== Songs ===
- "Game Over" (Josie Zec song), representing Croatia at Junior Eurovision 2014
- "Game Over" (Martin Garrix and Loopers song), 2018
- "Game Over" (Tinchy Stryder song), 2010
- "Game Over" (Vitaa song), 2013
- "Game Over (Flip)", by Lil' Flip, 2003
- "Game Over", by Alexa Vega, 2003
- "Game Over", by Avenged Sevenfold from Life Is But a Dream..., 2023
- "Game Over", by Brandon Yates from Death Battle, 2024
- "Game Over", by Destiny's Child from Destiny Fulfilled, 2004
- "Game Over", by Falling in Reverse from Fashionably Late, 2013
- "Game Over", by G.E.M., 2009
- "Game Over", by Lost Society from Terror Hungry, 2014
- "Game Over", by Machine Head from Bloodstone & Diamonds, 2014
- "Game Over", by Nightingale from I, 2000
- "Game Over", by Scarface from The Untouchable, 1997
- "Game Over", by Upon a Burning Body from Red. White. Green., 2012
- "Game Over", by VV Brown from Travelling Like the Light, 2009
- "Computer-Reign (Game Over)", by Ayreon from The Final Experiment, 1995

== Television ==
- Game Over (TV series), a 2004 American animated sitcom
- Game Over, a British video-game magazine show on .tv
- Game Over, a character in the video-game segment of the game show Nick Arcade

=== Episodes ===
- "Game Over" (30 Rock)
- "Game Over" (Ben 10)
- "Game Over" (CSI: Miami)
- "Game Over" (Dexter's Laboratory)
- "Game Over" (Heroes Reborn)
- "Game Over" (Most Dangerous Game)
- "Game Over" (Ninjago)
- "Game Over" (Ultimate Spider-Man)
- "Game Over" (YuYu Hakusho)

== Other ==
- Game Over or #GameOver, campaign focused on the treatment of asylum seekers in Australia headed by Craig Foster
- Game Over (video game), a 1987 computer game
- Iris Kyle (born 1974), nicknamed Game Over, American professional bodybuilder
- Mike Green (ice hockey, born 1985), former NHL player nicknamed "Game Over" while playing for the Washington Capitals

== See also ==
- The Game Is Over, a 1966 French drama film
- Game Over, Man!, a 2018 American action comedy film
