= Game Over (2013 film) =

- Film poster
- pe: بازی تمام شد
- Directed by: Seyed Mohsen Pourmohseni Shakib
- Written by: Seyed Mohsen Pourmohseni Shakib
- Produced by: Seyed Mansour Pourmohseni Shakib; Seyed Ebrahim Pourmohseni Shakib
- Release date: 2013
- Running time: 4 minutes
- Country: Iran
- Language: English

Game Over (Persian: بازی تمام شد) is 2013 Iranian animated short film directed by Seyed Mohsen Pourmohseni Shakib. It is the director's second animated short film. Game Over currently has distribution with IndieFlix online video streaming service. Although the film has no dialogue, it was nominated at the Cambridge student film festival for its soundtrack; it addresses the topics of children and peace.

Game Over was screened at numerous festivals, including FreeNetWorld International Film Fest, Seoul International Youth Film Festival and Tehran International Short Film Festival.

== Plot ==
In a war videogame, where even the sun is evil, four missiles fired from a military airplane decide to destroy the world. But fortunately the children who live inside that game find a way to stop them.

== Screenings ==
=== 2013 ===
- National Student Film Festival - Iran
- Watersprite: Cambridge International Student Film Festival - UK / Nominated For " Soundtrack Award "
- International Motion Festival - Cyprus
- Chilemonos International Animation Festival - Chile
- International Student Film Festival - Mexico
- Diversity In Animation Festival - Brasil
- Open International Festival of Multimedia Art «Multimatograf» - Russia
- Digital Graffiti Festival - USA
- Vagrant Film Festival - Belarus
- Seoul International Youth Film Festival - South Korea
- Film Festival della Lessinia - Italy
- Electric Lantern Festival - UK
- Ecologico International Film Festival - Italy
- No Gloss Film Festival - UK
- 48,40 Frames - Kurzfilmfestival - Austria
- South Texas Underground Film Festival - USA
- Tehran International Short Film Festival - Iran
- Festival Internacional de Cine, Arte y Cultura - Paraguay
- Isfahan International Festival of Films for Children & Young Adults - Iran
- Northern Wave International Film Festival - Iceland
- Simultan Festival - Romania
- FreeNetWorld International Film Fest - Serbia

=== 2014 ===
- Montréal International Children's Film Festival - Canada
- Basij Honarmandan Provincial Film Festival - Guilan, Iran
- Image Of The Year Festival - Iran
- Athens Animation Festival - Greek
- Golden Kuker: Sofia International Animation Film Festival - Bulgaria
- Gothenburg Independent Film Festival - Sweden
- Ordibehesht National Festival - Iran
- BornShorts Film Festival - Denmark
- Ekotopfilm - International Festival of Sustainable Development Films - Slovakia
- YOUKI International Youth Media Festival - Austria
- Anim!Arte - International Student Animation Festival - Brazil
- Karama Human Rights Film Festival - Jordan

=== 2015 ===
- CSM International Children's Film Festival - India
- Karama Gaza Human Rights Film Festival - Palestine

=== 2019 ===
- Bay Area Children's film International festival

== Broadcast ==
- IRIB 4 - Iran / Tehran
- Transit TV (Out The Window) - USA / Los Angeles
- Namayesh TV - Iran / Tehran
- 0 to 100 Television
- Okto TV (Delete) - Asturia / Vienna

== Project ==
- Side Street Projects by ArtNight Pasadena (CA - USA)
