= Online gaming =

Online gaming may refer to:

- Online game, a game played over a computer network
- Online gambling, gambling using the Internet

== See also ==
- Gamble (disambiguation)
- Game (disambiguation)
- Gamer, a person who plays games, especially video games
- Gaming (disambiguation)
