= White Paper (film) =

2010 short film by Seyed Mohsen Pourmohseni Shakib

- Official poster
- Directed by: Seyed Mohsen Pourmohseni Shakib
- Written by: Seyed Mohsen Pourmohseni Shakib
- Produced by: Seyed Mohsen Pourmohseni Shakib
- Release date: 2010
- Running time: 4 minutes
- Country: Iran
- Language: English

White Paper (Persian: کاغذ سفید, romanized: Kaghaz-e Sefid) is a 2010 Iranian animated short film about LGBT rights and homophobia, directed by Seyed Mohsen Pourmohseni Shakib. It is director's debut short animation.

== Premise ==
In a monochromatic world, six colored children are isolated and driven out by their families for being different. Grouping together the young outcasts become a community and change their world from a bleak and persecuted world to a bright, colorful and tolerant one that accepts people of all colors.

== Festivals & TV ==
Festivals

2010

- Student National Film Festival - Iran

2011

- FiLUMS - International LUMS Film Festival - Pakistan
- Out Film Festival - USA
- Frameline: San Francisco International LGBT Film Festival - USA
- Seoul International Youth Film Festival - South Korea
- Pikes Peak Lavender Film Festival - USA
- Eau Queer Film Festival - USA
- Sacramento International LGBT Film Festival - USA
- South Texas Underground LGBT Film Festival - USA
- Seattle Lesbian & Gay Film Festival - USA
- Roshd International Film Festival - Iran
- Reeling: Chicago International LGBT Film Festival - USA
- Soore National Short Film Festival - Iran
- Mix Brasil Film Festival - Brasil

2012

- Reelout Queer Film + Video Festival - Canada
- Zinegoak International Film Festival - Spain
- Sekanse Bidari National Film Festival - Iran
- Diversity in Animation Festival - Brasil
- Pink Apple Film Festival - Switzerland
- London Lesbian Film Festival - Canada
- Out Twin Cities Film Festival - USA
- Kashish-Mumbai International Queer Film Festival - India
- Campfire Film Festival - Australia
- The Xposed International Queer Film Festival - Germany
- Louisville LGBT Film Festival - USA
- North Carolina Gay & Lesbian Film Festival - USA
- Hamburg International Queer Film Festival - Germany

2013

- Out in the Desert: Tucson's International LGBT Film Festival - USA
- Malmo Queer Film Festival - Sweden
- Torino LGBT Film Festival - Italy
- Queer Film Festival - Identities Vienna - Asturia
- Festival Internacional de Cine en Guadalajara - Mexico
- 48,40 Frames - Kurzfilmfestival - Austria
- Festival Internacional de Cine, Arte y Cultura - Paraguay

2015

- CSM International Children's Film Festival - India

TV

- 2010 - December - IRIB 4 - Iran
- 2011 - July - Itzon TV - Online
- 2011 - November - Shoma TV - Iran

Project

- 2014 - 2 March - Art For Freedom's secretprojectrevolution by Madonna

== Awards ==
- 2011 – Emerging Filmmaker Award: South Texas Underground LGBT Film Festival

== Credits ==
- Producer: Seyed Mohsen Pourmohseni Shakib
- Screenwriter: Seyed Mohsen Pourmohseni Shakib
- Designer: Mojtaba Gheybie
- Animator: Seyed Ali Sayah
- Sound: Hamidreza Yasouri
- Edit: Seyed Mohsen Pourmohseni Shakib
