= Gaming industry =

Gaming industry, game industry, or games industry may refer to:

- Gambling industry
  - Especially in reference to casinos
  - Online gambling industry
- GamesIndustry, subsidiary of Eurogamer
- Industry related to games
- Tabletop game industry
- Video game industry

== See also ==
- Gaming
