= Winter games =

Winter games may refer to:

- Winter Games (1985 videogame), videogame by Epyx
- "Winter Games" (2PM song), 2013 song
- "Winter Games" (Olympic theme song), theme song of 1988 Winter Olympics
- Winter sports
- Winter Olympic Games
- Winter Paralympic Games
- Winter X Games
- Nordic Games
- Winter Games (album), an album by Chris Garneau
- "Winter Games", an episode of the TV series Pocoyo

== Other uses ==
- Game2: Winter, 2017 Russian reality television series
- Winter Universiade (Winter University Games)
- Winter Military World Games, see Military World Games
- World Scout Winter Games
- Winter Youth Olympics
- Special Olympics World Winter Games, see Special Olympics World Games
- Alberta Winter Games
- Asian Winter Games
- Arctic Winter Games
- BC Winter Games
- Canada Winter Games
- National Winter Games of China
- Commonwealth Winter Games
- Empire State Winter Games, see Empire State Games
- New Zealand Winter Games
- Quebec Winter Games, see Quebec Games
- Winter X Games Europe

== See also ==
- Summer Games (disambiguation)
- Games (disambiguation)
