= SpoCon =

- Status: Active
- Genre: Multi-genre, Scifi/Fantasy
- Venue: The Davenport Hotel
- Location: (Washington (state)) Spokane, Washington
- Country: United States
- Inaugurated: 2008 (recurring), 1984 (inaugural).
- Attendance: 500 - 1000
- Filing status: Non-profit

SpoCon was a full-spectrum science fiction and fantasy convention held annually in Spokane, Washington, USA. SpoCon is a non-profit organization that supports literacy and the public schools through annual events and donations. In 2022, the event had its last convention, citing low attendance as the reason for discontinuing.

== History ==
The first SpoCon was held in 2008 at Gonzaga University. Attendance was far more than anticipated, in large part because the Guest of Honor was Timothy Zahn.

The second SpoCon, with the theme "Are You Fan Enough?", was held July 31 - August 2, 2009 at Gonzaga.

The third SpoCon, with the theme of "The Year Fans Make Contact," ( From 2001: A Space Odyssey ) was held July 30 to August 1, 2010. The Guest of Honor was artist Michael Whelan.

The 2011 convention had "The Power of Fandom" as the theme and featured best-selling author Patricia Briggs as Guest of Honor. This was the first SpoCon to leave the college campus and make a new home in the Spokane Doubletree Hotel. It was held August 12–14, 2011 and drew record numbers of attendees.

In 2012, SpoCon changed from the traditional convention-committee style of leadership and operation to a business model, with the aim of creating a more efficient, forward-thinking and productive organization.

In 2016 SpoCon changed back from a business model to a 501c3 non profit organization and the convention-committee style of leadership was reinstated.

In 2017 SpoCon returned with a new convention committee and returned to the Doubletree Hotel.

The 2018 convention had "Shoot for the Stars" as the theme.

In 2019 the convention moved from the Spokane Doubletree Hotel to the Historic Davenport Hotel. The theme was "All Hail the Goblin King" with goblin-related programming and guests.

== Location and dates ==
Dates	Location	Attendees	Notable guests	Notes
August 1–3, 2008	Gonzaga University; Spokane, WA	700	Timothy Zahn, Mark Ferrari, Steve Perrin, Vixy & Tony,	
July 31-August 2, 2009	Gonzaga University; Spokane, WA	730	L. E. Modesitt, Jr., Steve Long, Alan Boyle, John Picacio, Kathy Mar	
July 30-August 1, 2010	Gonzaga University; Spokane, WA	874	Michael Whelan, Tanya Huff, Dead Gentlemen Productions, Seanan McGuire	
August 12–14, 2011	Doubletree Hotel; Spokane, WA	109	Patricia Briggs, Dragon Dronet, Dead Gentlemen Productions, Dan Dos Santos	
August 10–12, 2012	Doubletree Hotel; Spokane, WA	900	Peter S. Beagle, Mira Grant, Rob Alexander, Dead Gentlemen Productions	
August 9–11, 2013	Doubletree Hotel; Spokane, WA	500	Brandon Sanderson, Mark Osier, Chub Chub Maximus	
August 11–13, 2017	Doubletree Hotel; Spokane, WA	300	Kat Richardson, Betsy Mott, Epic Gaming	
August 10–12, 2018	Doubletree Hotel; Spokane, WA	300	Dr. James C. Glass, Dave Anderson of the 501st Legion, Jim Humble, William C. Dietz, The Grammar Club	
August 9–11, 2019	The Historic Davenport Hotel, Spokane, WA	300	Ellipsis Hana Stephens, Alan M. Clark, Dr. Kempe Ames	
