= The Game =

The Game or The Games may refer to:

== Sports and games ==
=== College sports ===
- Hampden–Sydney vs. Randolph–Macon rivalry, an annual American college football game
- Harvard–Yale football rivalry, an annual American college football game
- Michigan–Ohio State football rivalry, an annual American college football game

=== Other uses in sports and games ===
- The Game (dice game) (German: Das Spiel), a dice game designed by Reinhold Wittig
- The Game (mind game), a mind game, the objective of which is to avoid thinking about The Game itself
- The Game (treasure hunt), a 24- to 48-hour treasure hunt / puzzlehunt / road rally
- The Game Headwear, a sports apparel and equipment company
- Triple H (born 1969), American professional wrestler

== Literature ==
- The Game (Dryden book), a 1983 memoir by ice hockey player Ken Dryden
- The Game (London novel), 1905, by Jack London
- The Game (Hughes novel), or Invitation to the Game, a 1990 novel by Monica Hughes
- The Game (King novel), 2004, by Laurie R. King
- The Game (Jones novel), a 2007 novella by Diana Wynne Jones
- The Game (play), 1916, by Harold Brighouse
- The Game: Penetrating the Secret Society of Pickup Artists, a book by Neil Strauss
- The Game, a novel by A. S. Byatt
- The Game, a novel by Hans Ruesch
- The Game, a novel by Michael Hastings
- The Games, a 1968 novel by Hugh Atkinson
- Sherlockian game, or the Game, a pastime among readers of the Sherlock Holmes stories

== Films and television ==
=== Film ===
- The Games (film), 1970, directed by Michael Winner
- The Game (1997 film), directed by David Fincher, starring Michael Douglas and Sean Penn
- The Game (1998 film), a Scottish TV movie set during the 1978 World Cup, directed by Haldane Duncan
- The Game (2010 film), a Ghanaian film
- The Game (2022 film), a Sri Lankan film
- The Game (Highlander), the series of battles to become "the one" among the Immortals, in the Highlander film and television franchise

=== TV shows ===
- The Game (Australian TV series), a TV program covering the Australian Football League
- The Game (2006 TV series), a comedy-drama series on The CW and BET
- The Game (2021 TV series), a revival of the 2006 American series on Paramount+
- The Game (2014 TV series), a 2014 British spy thriller series on BBC Two
- The Game (2025 TV series), a British thriller series on Channel 5
- The Games (Australian TV series), a mockumentary about the 2000 Sydney Olympics
- The Games (British TV series), a celebrity athletics competition
- The Game: Towards Zero, a 2020 South Korean TV series
- The Game, a 1991 British series covering Sunday league football, hosted by Danny Baker

=== Episodes ===
- "The Game" (The Amazing World of Gumball)
- "The Game" (Desperate Housewives)
- "The Game" (Girlfriends)
- "The Game" (Lucky Feller)
- "The Game" (Recess)
- "The Game" (Saved by the Bell)
- "The Game" (Star Trek: The Next Generation)
- "The Game" (Stargate Atlantis)
- "The Games" (Sir Arthur Conan Doyle's The Lost World)

== Music ==
=== Perfomers ===
- The Game (band), from England
- The Game (rapper) (born 1979), American rapper

=== Albums ===
- The Game (Alyssa Reid album)
- The Game (Chico DeBarge album)
- The Game (Queen album)
- The Game (Richie Rich album)
- The Game (Sham 69 album)

=== Songs ===
- "The Game" (Alyssa Reid song)
- "The Game" (Common song)
- "The Game" (Disturbed song)
- "The Game" (DragonForce song)
- "The Game" (Echo & the Bunnymen song)
- "The Game" (Red Flag song)
- "The Game", by The Agonist from Five
- "The Game", by Amaranthe from Manifest
- "The Game", by Code Orange from The Above
- "The Game", by Cold Chisel from Twentieth Century
- "The Game", by Dive Dive
- "The Game", by Drowning Pool from WWF Forceable Entry
- "The Game", by End of Fashion from End of Fashion
- "The Game", by Jurassic Five from Quality Control
- "The Game", by Lacuna Coil from Karmacode
- "The Game", by The Levellers from Levelling the Land
- "The Game", by Mary Hopkin from Post Card
- "The Game", by Masterplan from Novum Initium
- "The Game", by Motörhead from Hammered
- "The Game", by New Order from Music Complete
- "The Game", by Nightingale from I
- "The Game", by Pain from Nothing Remains the Same
- "The Game", by Smash Mouth from Magic
- "The Game", by Soul Asylum from Candy from a Stranger
- "The Game", by Starbenders
- "The Game", by Trapt from Trapt
- "The Game", from Clue The Musical
- "The Game", from Damn Yankees
- "Fame (The Game)", by Donna Summer

== Other media ==
- The Game (audio drama), a 2005 Doctor Who audio drama
- The Game (podcast), an association football podcast
- KGMZ-FM or 95.7 FM, "The Game", an all-sports FM radio station in San Francisco, California
- KXTG or 95.5 FM, "The Game", an all-sports FM radio station in Portland, Oregon

== Other uses ==
- The Game, in Synanon, a truth-telling session
- "The game", a principle espoused by the 20th-century Greek philosopher Kostas Axelos

== See also ==
- Game (disambiguation)
- Big Game (disambiguation)
- The Game of the Century (disambiguation)
- The game of their lives (disambiguation)
- Don 2: The Game, a 2013 action video game based on the Indian film Don 2
