= FNW =

FNW may refer to:

- Fairy Meadow railway station, in New South Wales, Australia
- Farnworth railway station, in England
- First North Western, a defunct English train operator
- FreeNetWorld International Film Fest
- French New Wave, an art film movement from the 1950s
- Frum News Wire, an American news hotline
