= Purple Ninja =

Purple Ninja may refer to:

- Nelson (Ninjago), also known as the "Purple Ninja" a character in Ninjago
- The Purple Ninja, a character appearing in several Dead Gentlemen Productions films
