= Gamble House =

Gamble House may refer to:

- Gamble House (Pasadena, California), an Arts and Crafts style masterpiece that is a U.S. National Historic Landmark
- Gamble Plantation Historic State Park, Ellenton, Florida, listed on the NRHP in Manatee County, Florida as Robert Gamble House
- James Gamble House, Le Claire, Iowa, listed on the NRHP in Scott County, Iowa
- Dillard-Gamble Houses, Durham, North Carolina, listed on the NRHP in Durham County, North Carolina
- Gamble House (Williamsburg County, South Carolina), near Nesmith, South Carolina, listed on the National Register of Historic Places in Williamsburg County, South Carolina
