= Seyed Mohsen Pourmohseni Shakib =

Iranian film director

- سید محسن پورمحسنی شکیب
- Born: 1988 (age 37–38); Rasht, Iran
- Occupations: Film director, screenwriter
- Years active: 2010–present
- Notable work: It's A Gray, Gray World

Seyed Mohsen Pourmohseni Shakib (Persian: سید محسن پورمحسنی شکیب, born 1988) is an Iranian film director and screenwriter who began his art career at age 17 by becoming a member of the Iranian Youth Cinema Society. His focus as a filmmaker has been elevating the voices of marginalized people through his art. His fifth animated short film The Boot was the first Iranian-produced short film that received a nomination for the best animation at the 49th Student Academy Awards in 2022. The animation story was about a bird struggling to find food for its hungry chicks in a city ravaged by war and famine where there is nothing but wreckage and corpses. Furthermore, He won the 6th WIA Diversity Award for his short animation It's A Gray, Gray world! in 2022. The award was created by Women in Animation to recognize and celebrate projects and people that have made a substantial impact in broadening the diversity of voices in the animation industry- whether it be through their own creativity, by fostering the creativity of others, or by driving diversity initiatives that enrich animation industry and communities. It's A Gray, Gray World! won the Best Animated Short Jury Award at the 47th Cleveland Film Festival and was longlisted for the Short Film Animated category at 96th Academy Awards. The story is set in a completely gray world. People are terrified when a playful boy accidentally reveals the colorful identity of a conservative young man.

== Filmography ==
As director:

- 2010 - White Paper
- 2012 - Game Over
- 2016 - Oracle
- 2018 - Ballsy: Story of A Revolution
- 2021 - The Boot
- 2022 - It's A Gray, Gray World

== See also ==
- Cinema of Iran
