= Summer Games =

Summer Games can refer to:

- The Summer Olympic Games
- Summer Games (video game), a 1984 video game
- Summer Games II, a 1985 sequel to the above game
- Summer Games (1984 film), a 1984 Italian film
- Summer Games (2011 film), a 2011 Swiss film
- Overwatch seasonal events#Summer Games, a seasonal event appearing in Overwatch

== See also ==
- Winter games (disambiguation)
- Games (disambiguation)
