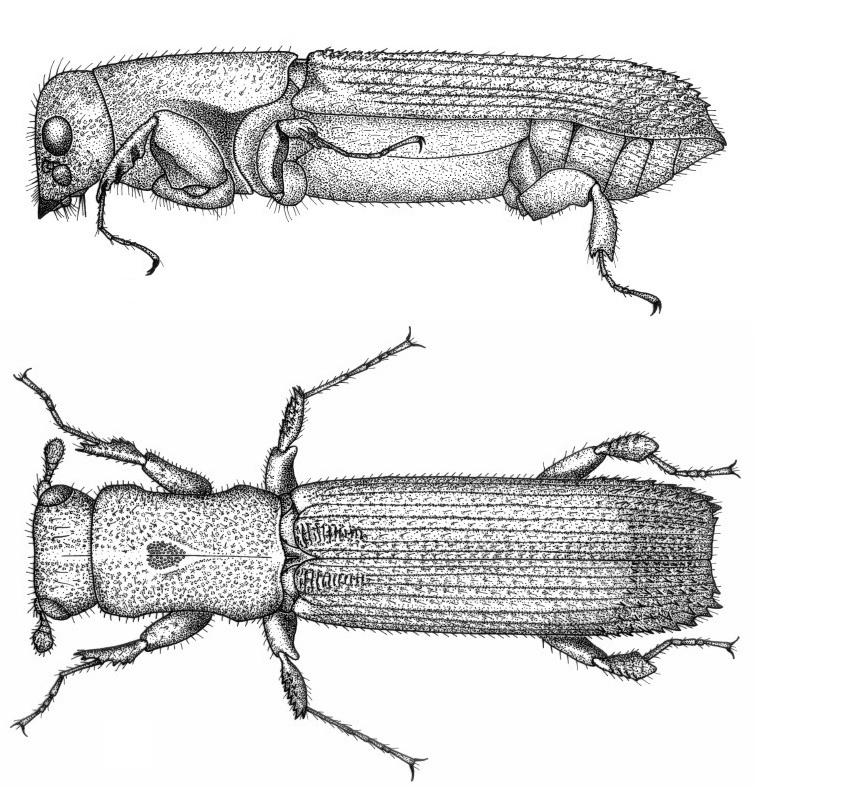

Scientific classification
- Kingdom: Animalia
- Phylum: Arthropoda
- Clade: Pancrustacea
- Class: Insecta
- Order: Coleoptera
- Suborder: Polyphaga
- Infraorder: Cucujiformia
- Superfamily: Curculionoidea
- Family: Curculionidae
- Subfamily: Platypodinae
- Tribe: Platypodini
- Genus: Austroplatypus
- Species: A. incompertus

Binomial name
- Austroplatypus incompertus (Schedl, 1968)

= Austroplatypus incompertus =

Species of beetle

Austroplatypus incompertus, a type of ambrosia beetle, is endemic to Australia. They are found in mesic forests, and subtropical and tropical ecosystems along the east coast of Australia. There are many unique characteristics attributable to A. incompertus, like their gallery excavation in several Eucalyptus species, their obligate eusocial behavior, their relationship with fungi, and their unusual sexual dimorphism with males smaller than females, the reverse of the pattern seen in other ambrosia beetles. These beetles are among the few insects outside of Hymenoptera and Isoptera that are obligately eusocial.

== Taxonomy ==
A. incompertus has been subject to extensive taxonomic reshuffling, with the species being misidentified by classifying female and male A. incompertus as different species (given the sexual dimorphism). Characterization of the mitochondrial cytochrome oxidase 1 gene showed that there was substantial genetic divergence between southern and northern populations in Australia. Upon constructing a phylogenetic analysis of A. incompertus, it was discovered that their lineage is younger than eusocial termites but older than eusocial bees.

With the use of genome-wide markers, one study shows that the genus Austroplatypus is dispersal limited but resilient to extinction despite low levels of heterozygosity and gene flow. This characteristic of the genus is similar to other eusocial insect lineages. Another species is newly identified as A. incostatus, which would represent a second eusocial species in the genus.

== Geographic range ==
A. incompertus is endemic to Australia, extending from Omeo in Victoria and Eden in NSW north to Dorrigo and west to the Styx River State Forest in Northern NSW.

== Habitat ==
Like other ambrosia beetles, A. incompertus lives in nutritional symbiosis with ambrosia fungi. They excavate tunnels in living trees in which they cultivate fungal gardens as their sole source of nutrition. New colonies are founded by fertilized females that use special structures called mycangia to transport fungi to a new host tree. The mycangia of A. incompertus and the specific manner in which the species acquires fungal spores for transport have been studied and compared with the mechanisms used by other ambrosia beetles. Fertilized females begin tunneling into trees in the autumn and take about seven months to penetrate 50 to 80 mm deep to lay their eggs.

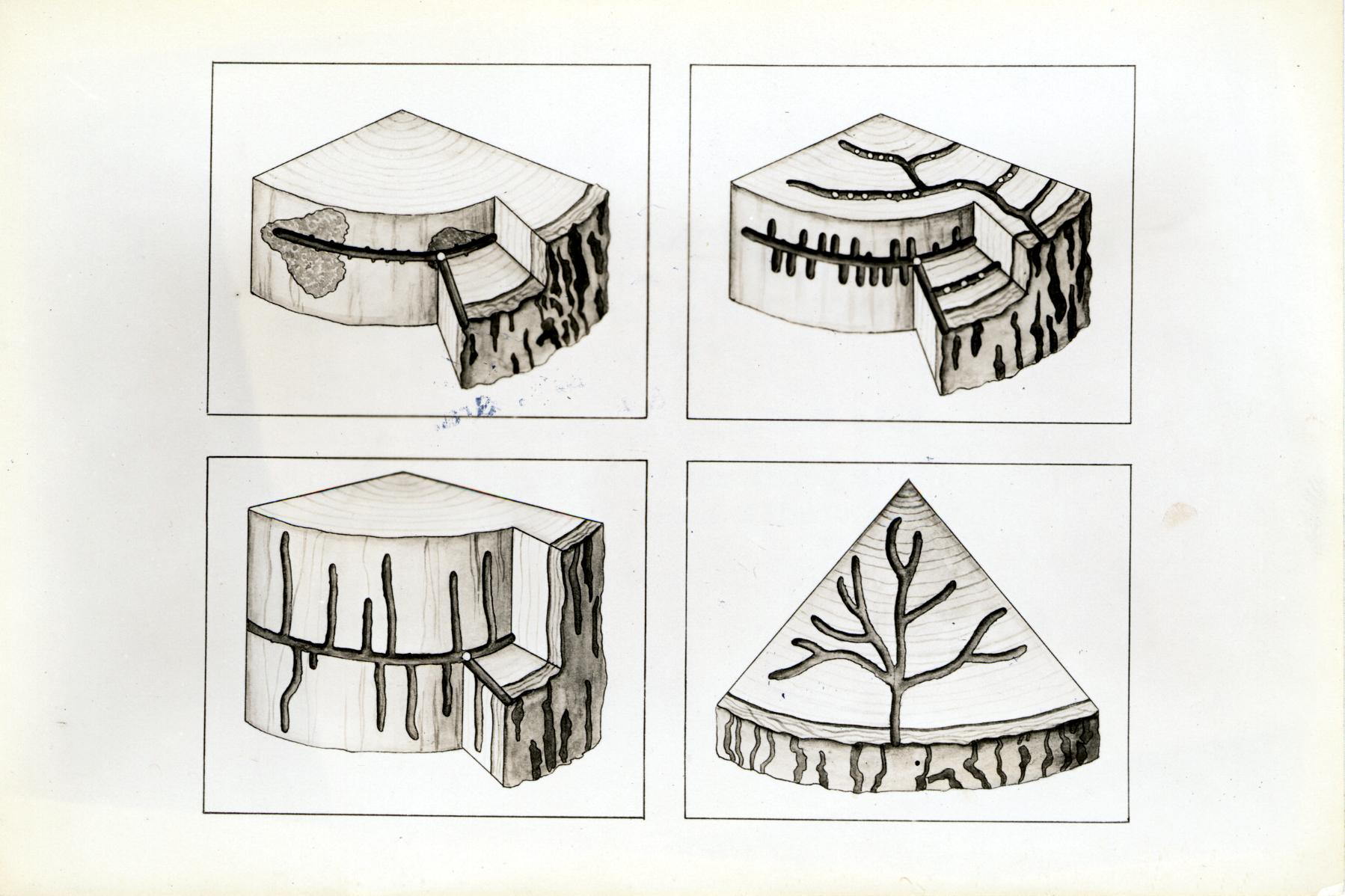

=== Host trees ===
An assessment by the United States Department of Agriculture (USDA) on unprocessed logs and chips of 18 eucalypt species from Australia discovered A. incompertus in most of them, including: Eucalyptus baxteri, E. botryoides, E. consideniana, E. delegatensis, E. eugenioides, E. fastigata, E. globoidea, E. macrorhyncha, E. muelleriana, E. obliqua, E. pilularis, E. radiata, E. scabra, E. sieberi, and Corymbia gummifera. Unlike most ambrosia beetles, it infests healthy, undamaged trees, and its symbiotic fungi do not kill the host tree.

In Australia, A. incompertus is a pest, given its life cycle, its habit of excavating galleries into timber, and its relationship with Raffaelea fungi. The Raffaelea found on these beetles cause a pencil streaking effect on timber, which degrades timber quality.

== Food resources ==
=== Fungal symbiosis ===
Four main fungal families found with A. incompertus are Cladosporiaceae, Phaeomoniellacae, Herpotrichiellaceae and Aspergillaceae, although many more fungi are present but remain unidentified to the family level. Austroplatypus incompertus is one of the few ambrosia beetles that develop in living trees without affecting the health of the tree itself. The primary fungal symbiont, which is a fungus that takes upon a host organism for its resources, for this species is an undescribed species of Raffaelea. Females of A. incompertus have specialized pronotal mycangial plates. These plates contained 70 pits meant to house symbionts like Raffaelea. One study showed that the composition of the fungal species seen on the mycangial plates varied with geographic location.

==== Parasites ====
Bacteria may grow as parasites upon the fungi carried by A. incompertus. One major parasite of these fungi are bacteria in the genus Escovopsis. However, beetles often carry bacteria such as Streptomyces that inhibit the growth of these bacterial parasites.

== Morphology and life cycle ==
The egg of A. incompertus is about 0.7 mm in length and 0.45 mm wide. It develops through five instars and its head grows from around 0.3 mm wide in the first instar to 0.9 mm wide in the fifth instar. It then pupates and emerges as an adult - 6 mm long and 2 mm wide.

Using electron micrography, the fifth instar larval stage can be diagnosed from larval Dendroplatypus species on the basis of pronotal shape.

The adult has an elongated, cylindrical body typical of other platypodines, and displays sexual dimorphism, with males being the significantly smaller sex, an atypical arrangement among platypodine beetles. Females have elytral declivity adapted for cleaning of galleries and defense. Also, only females possess mycangia. Female A. incompertus are believed to require a longer and more robust thorax, as they use their elytral declivity and reinforced central and peripheral spines to guard gallery entrances from predators (phragmosis) and aid in waste shoveling.

The adult's maxillary palps, sensory olfactory organs, are three segmented. Prior research had incorrectly described A. incompertus with four segmented maxillary palps, which contributed to the frequent taxonomic misidentification of the species.

Size variation in A. incompertus is consistent with Bergmann's rule, which states individuals of a species/clade at higher altitudes or latitudes will be larger than those at lower ones. A significant variation in beetle sizes was seen between different eucalyptus species, with the largest beetles being seen in Eucalyptus delegatensis in the southern ranges of New South Wales and eastern Victoria, and the smallest being seen in Eucalyptus andrewsii in the Northern tablelands of New South Wales and adjacent areas of Queensland.

== Behavior ==
=== Social system ===
A fertilized female attempts to start a new colony by burrowing deep into the heart of a living tree, eventually branching off and depositing her fungal spores and larvae. When these larvae grow to adulthood, the males leave some time before the females, with an average of five females remaining behind, which quickly lose the last four tarsal segments on their hind legs. The sole entrance to the colony shortly thereafter is sealed by the tissues of the tree, enclosing the colony. This physical barrier traps the newly-emerged females, and they remain unfertilized, participating in maintenance, excavation, and defense of the galleries, but without reproducing, thereby forming and maintaining a social hierarchy.

Founding A. incompertus females have been observed to create galleries in over 19 different species of Eucalyptus trees. The galleries of mature colonies hold up to 100 larvae and eggs, and up to 13 adult females. Upon dissection of beetles found in the galleries, it was found that only one female had developed ovaries, visible oocytes, and a filled sperm storage organ, implying that the remaining females did not reproduce. A. incompertus invests equally in males and females, producing a 1:1 sex ratio.

=== Parenting behavior ===
The roles and behaviors of A. incompertus beetles between sexes are believed to have evolved over time. The role of guarding the gallery was presumably transferred from males to females. More importantly, analyses indicate that this species transitioned from biparental monogamy to exclusive maternal care complemented with lifetime sperm storage. This behavior likely evolved due to the facilitation of securing lifetime monogamy.

Mating occurs when a single female excavates a nest founding gallery. After mating, the female continues the excavation of her gallery, with her mate assisting in gallery maintenance, entrance blocking, and microclimate regulation for stable fungal growth. Founding females of this species remain inseminated through the entirety of their lifetime. The secondary purpose of males blocking the gallery entrance is to prevent mobile larvae from rolling/leaving the gallery.

=== Eusociality ===
A. incompertus is one of the few eusocial organisms outside of Hymenoptera (bees and ants) and Isoptera (termites). Eusocial insects develop large, multigenerational cooperative societies that assist each other in the rearing of young, often at the cost of an individual's life or reproductive ability. As a result, sterile castes within the colony perform nonreproductive work. This altruism is explained because eusocial insects benefit from giving up reproductive ability of many individuals to improve the overall fitness of closely related offspring. For an animal to be considered eusocial, it must satisfy the three criteria defined by Charles D. Michener in 1969: (1) the species must have reproductive division of labor. A. incompertus contains a single fertilized female that is guarded by a small number of unfertilized females that also do much of the work excavating galleries in the wood, satisfying the first criterion. (2) the group must have overlapping generations, a phenomenon found in A. incompertus. (3) A. incompertus also exhibits cooperative brood care, the third criterion for eusociality.

Generally, it is assumed that the helpers in cooperative breeding groups arise through the need for ‘fortress defense’ or ‘life insurance’. However, this theory can not explain the behavior of this ambrosia beetle, because workers are not present at the initial and very risky period of colony foundation; instead, the perceived benefit is that a worker is born into a colony that has already survived the risky initial phase, and a female is better off with a very high likelihood of helping to produce numerous siblings than dispersing and having a high likelihood of failing to reproduce at all. Helper A. incompertus may live for 10 to 30 years after their first sibling is born, almost as long as their mother. This contrasts the eusocial norm, where workers live only a matter of weeks or months while queens live for a year or more.

==== Hypotheses for evolution of eusociality ====
The reasons behind the evolution of eusociality in these weevils are disputed. Theoretically, the benefits to sacrificing one's own reproduction come in two ecological modes: “life insurers” and “fortress defenders”. Most Hymenoptera, the large majority of social insects, are life insurers, where eusociality is adapted as a safeguard from decreased life expectancy of offspring. Most termites, as fortress defenders, benefit from working together to best exploit a valuable ecological resource.

From A. incompertus' ecology, fortress defense is likely considering they excavate wood galleries in host trees with just a single entrance. Fortress defense is sufficient to evolve eusociality when three criteria are met: food coinciding with shelter, selection for defense against intruders and predators, and the ability to defend such a habitat. The female that begins the colony brings the weevils' source of food, its symbiotic fungi, to grow in the wood galleries that it excavates. This satisfies the first criterion. Females exhibit noticeably prominent spines on their elytra, and females are the only sex to defend the galleries, possibly satisfying the second criterion. The third criterion is insufficiently studied and demonstrated. The single entrance could potentially show ability to defend, though several commensals and at least one predator have been found residing in colonies. At least one study refutes this theory, in that the colony only requires defense in the time interval before workers are present, because the colony remains sealed off by tree tissue after that point.

A. incompertus inhabiting a live tree as opposed to a dead one may be the crucial difference that led to the evolution of social behavior. Success of colonies in this species is relatively low (12%) because it is difficult to occupy the living tissue of the trees and initial success of the fertilized female is challenged by an arduous period trying to overcome the tree's defenses while also warding off parasites and predators. Successful eusocial A. incompertus colonies do better reproductively than non-social groups in related lineages of ambrosia beetles. This could represent the "life insurer" model, in that benefits to a female from assisting her mother are substantial, giving a better chance of gene propagation through kin selection. While A. incompertus is a diploid species, meaning that the relatedness of siblings is only 50%, the odds of survival as a nest-founding female are considered to be so low that the option of helping to produce a large number of siblings is a viable strategy. It has been suggested that given the difficulty of colony founding, helper females may remain in hopes of inheriting the colony, but the data do not support this.

It is suggested that this organism evolved eusociality and altruistic behaviors in a somewhat different manner from those seen in other species, as it is the first known in the order Coleoptera to show such behavior. Understanding sociality in this group is of great importance in the study of the evolution of such systems, given its unique nature.

== See also ==
- Passalidae, an unrelated family of beetles that also live in wood and show parental care and group living
