= Gambling (disambiguation) =

Gambling is wagering something of value in the hope of winning. It may also refer to:

- Gambling (surname)
- Gambling (play), a 1929 play by George M. Cohan
- Gambling (film), a 1934 American adaptation of Cohan's play

== See also ==
- Gamble (disambiguation)
