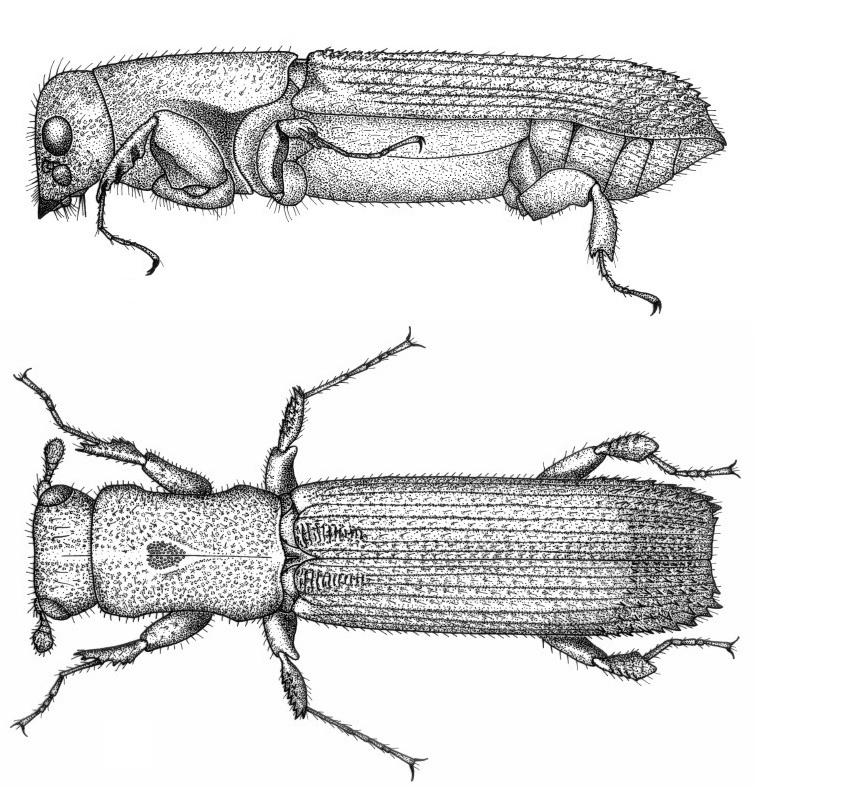

Scientific classification
- Domain: Eukaryota
- Kingdom: Animalia
- Phylum: Arthropoda
- Class: Insecta
- Order: Coleoptera
- Suborder: Polyphaga
- Infraorder: Cucujiformia
- Family: Curculionidae
- Subfamily: Platypodinae
- Tribe: Platypodini
- Genus: Austroplatypus; Browne, 1971

= Austroplatypus =

Genus of beetles

Austroplatypus is a genus of weevils native to Australia that includes Austroplatypus incompertus, the first beetle to be recognized as a eusocial insect. Members of the genus live in eucalypt trees and their fungal galleries can persist for decades because the host tree is not being killed.
