= The Gamble =

The Gamble may refer to:

- The Gamble (1916 film), an American short silent film
- The Gamble (1971 film), an Iranian film
- The Gamble (1988 film), an Italian comedy film
- "The Gamble" (The O.C.), a 2003 television episode
- "The Gamble" (The Onedin Line), a 1976 television episode
- The Gamble (book), a 2009 book by Thomas E. Ricks about the Iraq War

== See also ==
- Gamble (disambiguation)
