= Gamble (surname) =

Gamble is a surname of English origin. It is the 943rd most common surname in the United Kingdom. Notable people with the surname include:

- Bobby Gamble, English-Irish cricketer
- Cheryl Gamble (born 1970), American singer
- Chris Gamble (born 1983), American football player
- Clarence Gamble, American heir of the Procter and Gamble soap company fortune
- Clarence Gamble (tennis player)
- David Gamble (film editor) (born June 24, 1955), British film editor
- Donte Gamble (born 1978), American football player
- Ed Gamble, British comedian
- Frances Gamble (1949–1997), South African climatologist and speleologist
- Fred Gamble (actor) (1868–1939), actor
- Fred Gamble (racing driver) (born 1932), Formula One racer
- Frederick William Gamble (1869–1926), English zoologist
- James Gamble (industrialist) (1803–1891), co-founder of Procter & Gamble
- James Sykes Gamble (1847–1925), botanist
- Jim Gamble, British police officer
- John A. Gamble (1933–2009), Canadian politician
- John M. Gamble (1791–1836), United States Marine Corps officer
- Julian Gamble (born 1989), American basketball player in the Israeli Basketball Premier League
- Kane Gamble (born 1999), British hacker
- Kenneth Gamble (born 1943), songwriter and producer
- Kevin Gamble (born 1965), American professional basketball player
- Kevin Gamble (netcaster) (born 1973), filmmaker, animation producer, and podcaster
- Mason Gamble (born 1986), child actor who went on to become a marine biologist
- Miriam Gamble (born 1980), poet
- Nathan Gamble (born 1998), American child actor
- Oscar Gamble (1949–2018), former outfielder in Major League Baseball
- Peter Gamble (naval officer) (1793–1814), United States Navy officer
- Ryan Gamble (born 1987), Australian rules footballer
- Troy Gamble (born 1967), American hockey player
- William Gamble (business) (1805–1881), Canadian businessman
- William Gamble (general) (1818–1866), civil engineer and Union cavalry officer in the American Civil War

== See also ==
- Gambles (disambiguation), including people with the surname
