= The Gamblers =

The Gamblers may refer to:

== Film ==
- The Gamblers, a 1919 American drama film directed by Paul Scardon
- The Gamblers (1929 film), an American drama film directed by Michael Curtiz
- The Gamblers (1950 film), a French film based on the play by Nikolai Gogol
- The Gamblers (1970 film), an American film directed by Ron Winston based on the Gogol play
- The Gamblers (1990 film), a German film directed by Dominik Graf

== Literature ==
- The Gamblers, a 1901 novel by William Le Queux
- The Gamblers, a 1997 novel by Matt Braun
- The Gamblers, a 2018 photo book by Martin Amis

== Music ==
- The Gamblers (British band), primarily backing band of Billy Fury on Decca then Parlophone
- The Gamblers (surf band), an American surf rock band

== Stage works ==
- The Gamblers (Gogol), an 1840 play by Nikolai Gogol
- The Gamblers (Shostakovich), or Igroki, an unfinished opera by Dmitri Shostakovich

== Other ==
- Houston Gamblers, US Football League team

== See also ==
- The Gambler (disambiguation)
