= Computer game (disambiguation) =

A computer game is an electronic game, used as a synonym for a video game in some regions.

Computer game may also refer to:

- PC game, a video game played on a personal computer
- Console game, a video game played on a video game console
- Arcade video game, a video game housed in an arcade cabinet
- Mobile game, a video game played on a mobile phone

== Publications ==
- Computer and Video Games, a British video games magazine published in print form from 1981 to 2004, and as a website from 1999 to 2015
- Computer Games Magazine, a British video games magazine published from 1988 to 2007, known at various times as Games International, Strategy Plus, and Computer Games Strategy Plus
- Computer Games, an American video games magazine edited by Dan Gutman, published from 1982 to 1985, originally known as Video Games Player

== Music ==
- "Computer Game" (song), 1978 song by Yellow Magic Orchestra
- "Computer Games" (song), 1979 song by Mi-Sex
- Computer Games (album), 1982 album by George Clinton
- Computer Games, reissue title of the album Graffiti Crimes by Mi-Sex

== See also ==
- Video Games (disambiguation)
