= Gambles =

Gambles is a surname. Notable people with the surname include:

- Joe Gambles (born 1982), Australian triathlete
- Martin Gambles (born 1980), Irish rugby league footballer

== See also ==
- Gambles, Pennsylvania, United States, an unincorporated community
- Gamble (disambiguation)
