= I'm Game (disambiguation) =

I'm Game may refer to:

- I'm Game (film), a 2026 Indian film
  - I'm Game (soundtrack), the 2026 soundtrack to the film
- "I'm Game", a single by Ian McNabb

== See also ==
- Game (disambiguation)
- In-game
