= Game2: Winter =

Russian reality television series

- Russian: Гаме2Винтер
- Genre: Reality
- Created by: Yevgeny Pyatkovsky
- Developed by: Natalia Sharonova
- Starring: Oksana Shiganova; Irina Agisheva; Natalya Korneva
- Theme music composer: Stanislav Koksharov
- Opening theme: "Main Theme"
- Composer: Stanislav Koksharov
- Country of origin: Russia
- Original languages: Russian, English, Chinese, French, German, Spanish and Arabic

Production
- Executive producer: Yevgeny Pyatkovsky
- Producers: Nikolay Ginzburg; Natalia Sharonova; Maria Kazantseva
- Production locations: Ob River region, Western Siberia, Russia
- Camera setup: 2000 fixed cameras
- Running time: 24/7

Game2: Winter (Russian: Гейм2Уинтер) was a social experiment and media stunt promoted as a Russian survival reality television program produced by Novosibirsk entrepreneur Yevgeny Pyatkovsky that was set to premiere in July 2017. The show caught the attention of the press when the show stated that its rules would allow crimes such as rape and murder which sparked outrage online. The show has been compared to a "real-life Hunger Games".

The project was revealed to be a social experiment used for marketing research purposes on 31 May 2017.

== Background ==
30 participants, half men and half women, were expected to compete on a remote Siberian island in the Ob River for a 100 million rouble ($1.7 million) prize on a nine-month survival mission. All contestants were said to have signed death waivers and agreed not to hold the organisers accountable for criminal activity.

We will refuse any claim of participants even if they were to be killed or raped. We will have nothing to do with this. This will be spelled out in a document to be signed by the participant before the start of the show. We will not intervene into relations between participants nor monitor their sexual life either, and our cameras will not be able to follow every move in every corner of the island.

— Yevgeny Pyatkovsky, executive producer

However, Snopes found that 'Despite multiple misleading headlines, the waiver described by news outlets explicitly stated that contestants on the show would be obliged to "obey the laws of the Russian Federation".'

== Production ==
=== Location ===
The production's home base was in Western Siberia, with the Ob River area proposed as the main filming location.

=== Casting call ===
On November 16, 2016, the production team posted a casting call via their VK account. Registration was closed on April 18, 2017 with over 340 applications.

As of May 2017, 120 people had qualified for runoff voting. The 30 finalists were set to be revealed that June.

=== Broadcasting ===
According to The Guardian, "five countries have already expressed the desire to broadcast [the show] for their audiences".
