= Video Games =

Video games are electronic games that involve interaction with a user interface.

(The) Video Game or Video Games may also refer to:

== Music ==
- Video Games Live, concerts by Tommy Tallarico
- "Video Game" (song), 2020, by Sufjan Stevens
- "Video Games" (Lana Del Rey song), 2011
- "Video Games" (Tenacious D song), 2023
- "Video Games", 1980, by Ronnie Jones

== Other media ==
- The Video Game, an American game show
- Video Games: The Movie, a 2014 documentary film
- VideoGames - The Ultimate Gaming Magazine, a defunct American periodical, 1988–1996
- Computer and Video Games, a British magazine

== See also ==
- Computer game (disambiguation)
