= Gamble Run =

Stream in West Virginia, U.S.

Coordinates: 39°35′32″N 80°54′33″W

Gamble Run is a stream in the U.S. state of West Virginia. It was named after John Gamble, a pioneer settler. John Gamble was murdered on this stream in 1850 after visiting a friend's house.

== See also ==
- List of rivers of West Virginia
