= The Gamers (film) =

- Film poster
- Directed by: Matt Vancil
- Written by: Matt Vancil
- Produced by: Various
- Starring: Matt Cameron; Chris Duppenthaler; Justin McGregor; Emily Olson; Phil M. Price; Nathan Rice
- Edited by: Ben Dobyns
- Music by: Ben Dobyns; Phil M. Price
- Distributed by: Dead Gentlemen Productions
- Release date: 2002
- Running time: 48 mins
- Country: United States
- Language: English
- Budget: $1,000

The Gamers is a 2002 film written and directed by Matt Vancil and produced by independent movie company Dead Gentlemen Productions. It is an affectionate spoof of role-playing games, and often shown at gaming conventions.

A sequel, The Gamers: Dorkness Rising, was released in 2008, with a second sequel, The Gamers: Hands of Fate, being released in 2013.

== Plot ==
The movie flips between following a group of gamers in a dorm immersed in a role-playing game, and their characters (played by the same actors) as they journey through a world of fantasy and wonder to defeat a being known as "The Shadow" and rescue a princess. The latter is theoretically a heroic quest, but while the game master attempts to foster in a narrative, the players tend to be more interested in their characters' tolerance for ale, trying to apply the sneak attack damage multiplier to siege weaponry, et cetera.

The movie both makes fun of gamer stereotypes and plays the discrepancy between an optimal RPG plot and the events of an actual RPG session for maximum absurdity. Characters attempting something dangerous freeze as dice clatter in the distance. The party thief picks the pocket of a bystander, then steals that bystander's pants—not because he wants the pants in any way, but solely to see if his skill statistics allow it. One character, while present, does not interact with the others for most of the game, as his player is absent. When an unlucky dice roll causes the death of one character, the other players' characters mourn him for a moment, and then immediately start squabbling over the items he was carrying. Characters spring to action, then keel over as their players forget and are reminded that the characters are asleep, players argue or cheer, and their game is frequently interrupted by a girl from the same dorm who demands they keep quiet so that she can study.

The Shadow is eventually defeated, after a long quest, and the characters find themselves in a strange tunnel. On the other side of the door, they hear voices—the voices of their players, who are narrating the action in the hallway outside. Bursting into the room (as dictated by the players), the characters slaughter the gamers, then begin picking over the room for treasure. They discover that their entire adventure has been documented by the "strange sorcerers" they have just slain via their character sheets. In the midst of these revelations, the "Princess" (the girl who needs to study and is constantly interrupted by the gamers' noise) bursts in and reads them the riot act, thinking their outfits to be mere costumes; after she leaves, the adventurers seem quite stunned that their beloved Princess has such a foul mouth and temper.

== Sequels and spin-offs ==
A sequel, The Gamers: Dorkness Rising, was set to be released in 2006, but was delayed due to problems finding a distributor. It was eventually released in August 2008.

A second sequel, The Gamers: Hands of Fate, funded via Kickstarter was revealed in segments via YouTube and released in its entirety in 2013.

In 2013, Zombie Orpheus Entertainment in cooperation with Dead Gentlemen Productions and Lynnvander Inc produced two miniseries, Natural One and Humans & Households, set in the Gamers universe. Both series mirror the structure of The Gamers by showing both players of a role-playing game and the fictitious characters they are playing.

Natural One features the characters Leo and Gary (the main characters in Dorkness Rising and Hands of Fate). The plot revolves around Monica, Gary's sister, who wants to marry her fiancé, Ryan. However, since Ryan is not a geek and an old agreement between Gary and Monica states that both of them may only marry geeks, Ryan has to prove his geekiness by beating a role-playing game scenario before Gary gives his blessing to the wedding. The fictitious role-playing game featured in the film is an homage to the popular cyberpunk role-playing game Shadowrun.

Humans & Households (the title is a reference to Dungeons & Dragons) turns the concept of The Gamers on its head: Characters in the fantasy world of The Gamers play a role-playing game set in our world.

In April 2015, a web series continuation of the plot of The Gamers was announced. It was intended to lead directly into the events of the next movie in the series and would chronicle exploits of the protagonists' characters who are now lost in the modern world. The project was funded via Kickstarter, much like The Gamers: Hands of Fate. The first installment of the series dubbed The Shadow Menace was released in August 2017.
