= Let the Games Begin =

Let the Games Begin may refer to:

- "Let the Games Begin" (song), by AJR
- "Let the Games Begin", a song by Anarbor from Free Your Mind
- "Let the Games Begin", an episode of the TV series Drive
- "Let the Games Begin" (Gilmore Girls)
- "Let the Games Begin" (Hercules: The Legendary Journeys)
- "Let the Games Begin" (Kid vs. Kat)
- "Let the Games Begin" (Under the Dome)
