= Martin Amis (photographer) =

British photographer

Martin Amis (born 1973) is a British landscape and documentary photographer, living in Whitstable, Kent.

== Work ==
The Gamblers (2018) is documentary photography about horse-racing enthusiasts in the south of England. It was made over 13 years from 2005, in colour and black and white.

This Land (2021) is black and white landscape photography made in the North Kent Marshes on the Thames Estuary in southeast England. It was begun in 2011, but the majority of the work is from 2020 and 2021.

Closed (2022) is a study of closed retail premises across Kent, mostly photographed straight-on. It was made over three years from 2018, in black and white, with a handheld camera.

== Personal life ==
Amis lives in Whitstable, Kent, where he runs an online photobook shop.

== Publications ==
- The Gamblers. Bristol: RRB, 2018. ISBN 978-1999727529.
- This Land. Whitstable: self-published / Photo Editions, 2021.
- Closed. Whitstable: self-published / Photo Editions, 2022.
