= Stephen Leeb =

American economist

- Born: July 14, 1946 (age 80)
- Spouse: Donna Leeb

Academic work
- Discipline: Economics, Psychology
- Institutions: Wharton School of Business; University of Illinois Urbana-Champaign
- Website: http://www.stephenleeb.com

Stephen Leeb (born July 14, 1946, in Chicago) is a money manager and investment adviser. For more than 45 years he has been guiding investors via newsletters, books, blogs, and appearances on financial news networks including CNN, Fox News, NPR and Bloomberg TV.

n 2003, Leeb founded the investment letter The Complete Investor, which he continued to produce through the end of 2024. Within its first year of publication, it won an award for editorial excellence from the Newsletter and Electronic Publishers Foundation, winning the award again in 2005. Leeb is currently in the process of launching a new online investment letter, Turbulent Times Investor.

Leeb is the author of nine books on finance, investing, and geopolitical trends, starting with "Getting in on the Ground Floor" (1986) through his most recent, “China’s Rise and the New Age of Gold” (2020).

He has been called one of the country's foremost financial experts by Business journalist Charlie Gasparino and one of the greatest long term strategists of his generation by American billionaire businessman Thomas Kaplan which can be summarized by Kaplan's statement and foreword in Leeb's 2012 release of Red Alert saying "I would caution readers to dismiss Stephen Leeb's warnings only at their peril."

Leeb is married to Donna Leeb, also an author, and lives in New York City, New York.

== Education ==
Leeb earned a B.S. in Economics from the Wharton School of Business, and a Masters in Mathematics and a PhD in Psychology from the University of Illinois Urbana-Champaign. He authored research papers on psychology and statistics in the peer-reviewed journal Psychological Reports. His graduate degrees were obtained in three years.

== Career ==
Leeb has written nine books on macroeconomic trends, Finance, and investing, including the New York Times business bestseller The Coming Economic Collapse: How You Can Thrive When Oil Costs $200 a Barrel. Leeb's earlier book Defying the Market, which predicted the dot.com bubble's collapse, was named one of the best business books of 1999 by the Library Journal. His book Red Alert has been called "a much needed shot in the arm for American complacency" by Publishers Weekly. Red Alert was awarded the 2012 Axiom Business Book Awards silver medal in the International Business/Globalization category.

Leeb is Head of the advisory board of Leor Exploration & Production LLC (since 2006) and a member of the advisory boards of Electrum USA Ltd. (since 2007) and Sunshine Silver Mines. Both companies explore for natural resources, especially precious metals and energy. In 2007 Leor sold assets to Canadian-based Encana Cp. for over $2.5 billion. He is also a member of the board and managing director of the PlainSight Group, an innovation company centered at Yale University.

== Predictions ==
Leeb accurately predicted $100-a-barrel oil, the Dow's secular rise above 4000, the collapse of the dot.com bubble, and the current bull market in precious and industrial metals. In Defying the Market, published in 1999, he also predicted the inadequacy of computers for solving the major challenges of the subsequent decade, in particular resource scarcity.

In The Coming Economic Collapse, published in 2006, Leeb wrote that a decline in nominal home prices would be "the vicious circle to end all vicious circles……..It would be a far greater challenge than rescuing the economy in the wake of the tech bubble... It would take massive amounts of money. Interest rates would likely fall to zero. Government spending would need to reach unimaginably high levels." Because of the potential consequences Leeb argued the Fed would prefer inflation rather than trying to cool an economy already stung by deflationary effects of high oil. In his subsequent book Red Alert, Leeb acknowledged he had been wrong to assume that the Federal Reserve "had the situation under control" and would "do whatever it took to assure that prices remained on an even keel."

Leeb's book Red Alert argues that the Chinese understand the issue of resource scarcity much better than the West and as a result of their accumulation of vital resources may leave the West in a nearly untenable position within the next decade.

Leeb is bullish on the price of gold. On King World News, he stated that "China, as I’ve repeatedly outlined, loves gold, is accumulating gold, and is proceeding with long-term initiatives, including a new monetary system, that will elevate gold in furtherance of China’s own interests".

In his latest book, China’s Rise and the New Age of Gold: How Investors Can Profit from a Changing World, published in 2020, Leeb chronicles and analyzes the global events, fluctuations in international currencies, market forces and economic trends which he predicts will result in a meteoric rise in the gold market.

== Books ==
- China's Rise and the New Age of Gold: How Investors Can Profit from a Changing World, with Donna Leeb (2020)
- Red Alert: How China's Growing Prosperity Threatens the American Way of Life, with Gregory Dorsey (2011)
- Game Over: How You Can Prosper in a Shattered Economy, with Glen Strathy (2009)
- The Coming Economic Collapse: How You Can Thrive When Oil Costs $200 a Barrel, with Glen Strathy (2006)
- The Oil Factor: Protect Yourself and Profit from the Coming Energy Crisis, with Donna Leeb (2004)
- Defying the Market: Profiting in the Turbulent Post-Technology Market Boom, with Donna Leeb (1999)
- The Agile Investor: Profiting from the End of Buy and Hold, with Roger S. Conrad (1997)
- Market Timing for the Nineties: The Five Key Signals for When to Buy, Hold and Sell, with Roger S. Conrad (1993)
- Getting in on the Ground Floor: How to Make Money Now - and From Now On - in the New Bull Market, with Donna Leeb (1986)
