= The Game of Their Lives =

The Game of Their Lives may refer to:

- The Game of Their Lives (2002 film), a documentary about the North Korean national football team that competed in the 1966 FIFA World Cup
- The Game of Their Lives (2005 film), a 2005 feature film about the United States national soccer team that competed in the 1950 FIFA World Cup
