= Martin Gambles =

Irish rugby league footballer

Personal information
- Full name: Martin Gambles
- Born: 8 March 1980 (age 46)

Playing information
Club
Years	Team	Pld	T	G	FG	P
2001	Gateshead Thunder	17	3	0	0	12
2002–04	Chorley Lynx	60	28	1	0	114
2005–08	Blackpool Panthers	87	19	19	0	114
	Total	164	50	20	0	240
Representative
Years	Team	Pld	T	G	FG	P
2005	Ireland	2	0	0	0	0

Martin Gambles is a professional rugby league footballer who played in the 2000s. He played at representative level for Ireland, and at club level for Gateshead Thunder, Chorley Lynx and Blackpool Panthers.

== International honours ==
Martin Gambles won caps for Ireland while at Blackpool Panthers 2005 2-caps.

Martin Gambles is currently leading try scorer for Great Britain Tag Rugby and captains the Wigan Wizards Tag Rugby Team.
