= Gamble Creek =

River in Florida, United States

Coordinates: 27.549865°N 82.391967°W

Gamble Creek is a stream in Manatee County, Florida, in the United States.

Gamble Creek derives its name from Major Robert Gamble Jr.

== See also ==
- List of rivers of Florida
