= Gaming =

Gaming may refer to:

== Games and sports ==
The act of playing games, as in:

- Legalized gambling, playing games of chance for money, often referred to in law as "gaming"
- Playing a role-playing game, in which players assume fictional roles
- Playing a tabletop game, any game played on a flat surface
- Playing a video game, an electronic game with a video interface
  - Esports, competitive video gaming
  - Video game culture
- Yip Gaming, a character in 2020 video game Genshin Impact

== Other uses ==
- Gaming, Austria, an Austrian market town and municipality
- Gaming the system, manipulating a system's rules to achieve a desired outcome
- "Gaming" (The Apprentice), a 2022 television episode

== See also ==
- Gamble (disambiguation)
- Game (disambiguation)
- Gamer, a person who plays games, especially video games
- History of games
- Online gaming (disambiguation)
