= The Gamers: Hands of Fate =

- Directed by: Matt Vancil, Ben Dobyns
- Written by: Matt Vancil, Nathan Rice
- Produced by: Rennie Araucto
- Starring: Brian Lewis; Trin Miller; Samara Lerman; Jesse Lee Keeter; Nathan Rice; Carol Roscoe; Scott C. Brown; Christian Doyle; Jennifer Page; Matt Shimkus; Conner Marx; Ahren Buhmann
- Cinematography: Jeremy Mackie, Nick Montgomery
- Edited by: Aubrey Kehres, Ben Dobyns
- Music by: Steve Wolbrecht
- Distributed by: Dead Gentlemen Productions
- Release date: 2013
- Running time: 125 min
- Country: United States
- Language: English

The Gamers: Hands of Fate is a 2013 gaming film written by Aubrey Kehres and Ben Dobyns and directed by Matt Vancil and Ben Dobyns. It is the second sequel of the 2002 film The Gamers by Dead Gentlemen Productions and was successfully funded via Kickstarter. It is produced by Zombie Orpheus Entertainment.

== Plot ==
The movie begins with a team of players playing the Pathfinder RPG (a tabletop role-playing game based on Dungeons and Dragons). Though the team experiences problems in its schedule and it is unable to meet for more than a year partially because one of the players, Leo, a hobby store owner, spends a lot of time on a fictionally old card game, Romance of the Nine Empires (R9E), by selling cards and organizing tournaments. At that point, the main character of the film, Cass, who dislikes collectible card games because of the amount of money the player has to spend and the lack of narrative, meets a veteran female player Natalie and quickly develops a crush on her. In order to approach her, he pretends to be a player and takes part in the tournament.

Players choose one of the nine mighty empires of Countermay to support in R9E, and both their decisions and the results of the tournaments have an impact on how the game develops. At the time a group called The Legacy, playing the role of the undead army Ixhasa, dominates the game's scene and through unpopular choices drives the players away from the game. Natalie plays for Holden, a small, peaceful agrarian kingdom.

Initially Natalie rejects Cass, but after she loses the tournament to one of the Legacy players and while she is frustrated with the outcome challenges him that if he wins the national tournament at Gen Con and puts her Queen on the God Head seat of Countermay, she will date him. While Natalie said ironically, Cass takes it literally and accepts the challenge.

While all this happens in the real world, an alternative narratative with painted scenery tells the story of Countermay and how the outcome of the game matches played by the real-world characters affects it.

Cass starts seriously learning the game and while at the beginning he is at a low level, he later discovers that his friend Leo is also an old player of the game who has now quit and is willing to teach him. Cass becomes a skilled player and meets Natalie again at Gen Con. While she is still mad at him, when she discovers his effort, and the skills he has acquired, she partially accepts him. Later on Cass makes his way through the Swiss to the finals, where he meets for the second time the best player of the game Meach. While the first time Cass was easily beaten and he is again overpowered, Meach, knowing that he can't beat the Legacy, proposes an alliance. He will concede the match and in exchange if Cass wins he will choose Meach's king to seat in the God Head Seat. Cass accepts the offer and wins the tournament, using a much discussed card - The Biggest Turnip. Later Natalie says that now she owes him a date. Cass argues that he didn't actually put her queen on the throne so she doessn't owe him. They agree to meet up at a future tournament.

== Cast ==
Cast overview, first billed only:

- Brian Lewis as Cass and Silence
- Trin Miller as Natalie
- Samara Lerman as Myriad
- Jesse Lee Keeter as Dundareel
- Nathan Rice as Lodge and Osric
- Carol Roscoe as Joanna and Daphne
- Scott C. Brown as Leo and Flynn
- Christian Doyle as Gary and Luster
- Jennifer Page as Penelope and Luster
- Matt Shimkus as The Shadow
- Conner Marx as Jase
- Ahren Buhmann as Byron
- M.J. Sieber as Hunter
- Jessica Avellone as Coeli Quando (The Messenger)
- Anne Allgood as The Queen

== Reception ==
The Gamers: Hands of Fate was reviewed by Becky Chambers for The Mary Sue, who described it as "a flawed-but-charming comedy that highlights the bad, embraces the good, and does both out of love. Watch it with your friends. Think about it. Pick it apart. [...] The filmmakers' intent, as I understand it, was to keep people talking, and to have fun doing it. In that, at the very least, they succeeded."

Holger Christiansen, of the German website Teilzeithelden, noted that The Gamers: Hands of Fate has little in common with its predecessors, which "doesn't make the film bad per se, but the title just raises completely wrong expectations." Christiansen was irritated that the minor storyline about Gary takes up too much screentime, and also found the many obvious product placements were distracting. He concluded on an ambiguous note, saying, "the film is successful, but not outstanding. If you have two hours to spare, you can watch it and be entertained. If you don't look at it, you haven't missed much either. It's actually a shame, because I had hoped for a lot more than that."

In the Introduction of The Role-Playing Society: Essays on the Cultural Influence of RPGs, editors Andrew Byers and Francesco Crocco bring up the use of role-playing games in films, including The Gamers: Hands of Fate, characterizing them as "mostly comedic but generally providing positive views of gamers while gently poking fun at their foibles." Byers and Crocco say these films "all tend to depict gamers as infantilized, socially awkward outcasts struggling to diffentiate their tabletop role-playing game interests from reality, a common trope in popular depictions of gamers."

== See also ==
- The Gamers (2002)
- The Gamers: Dorkness Rising (2008)
- Knights of Badassdom (2013)
