= Game Over: Jerry Sandusky, Penn State, and the Culture of Silence =

2012 book by Bill Moushey and Bob Dvorchak

- Author: Bill Moushey; Bob Dvorchak
- Language: English
- Genre: Non-fiction
- Publisher: William Morrow
- Publication date: April 17, 2012
- Pages: 224 pages
- ISBN: 978-0062201133

Game Over: Jerry Sandusky, Penn State, and the Culture of Silence is a 2012 book written by Bill Moushey and Bob Dvorchak about Jerry Sandusky and the Penn State child sex abuse scandal. Moushey in an investigative journalist, formerly with the Pittsburgh Post-Gazette, and a professor at the school of Communications at Point Park University. He won National Press Club's Freedom of Information Award in 1997. Dvorchak is a 40-year veteran journalist.

In the book, the authors reviewed the grand jury findings, focusing on the alleged sexual assaults, and investigated claims of a coverup by Penn State University officials in order to protect the reputation of the football program. The book was written over the course of 10 weeks.

The book alleged that Joe Paterno "had to know" of the sexual abuse allegations happening under his watch. The isolated nature of State College, Pennsylvania is used as a metaphor for the isolated nature of the football program.

During the publicity phase, an excerpt was published on the sports gossip website Deadspin.

The Paterno family immediately denounced the book. The family's lawyers called the book an "unprofessional and irresponsible rehash from clip files and anonymous interviews," specifically disputing the authors' claims that Paterno forced Sandusky's 1999 retirement to coverup abuse claims. In regard to the quick publication of the book, the Paterno family said that "The price of their obsession with speed over accuracy is a book that distorts the truth and offers conclusions and theories for which the authors have no evidence," he said.
