= The Mississippi Gambler =

The Mississippi Gambler may refer to:

- The Mississippi Gambler (1929 film), featuring Joseph Schildkraut and Joan Bennett
- Mississippi Gambler (film), a 1942 film directed by John Rawlins
- The Mississippi Gambler (1953 film), starring Tyrone Power and Piper Laurie
- Mississippi Gambler (album), a 1972 album by Herbie Mann
