= Gambling (surname) =

Gambling is a surname. Notable people with the surname include:

- John B. Gambling (1897–1974), host of the radio show "Rambling With Gambling" from 1925 to 1959
- John A. Gambling (1930–2004), host of the radio show "Rambling With Gambling" from 1959 to 1991
- John R. Gambling (born 1950), host of the radio show "Rambling With Gambling" from 1991 to 2000
- William Alexander Gambling (1926-2021), electrical engineer and pioneer of optical fibre communication
