= Dillard-Gamble Houses =

Historic houses in North Carolina, United States

- U.S. National Register of Historic Places
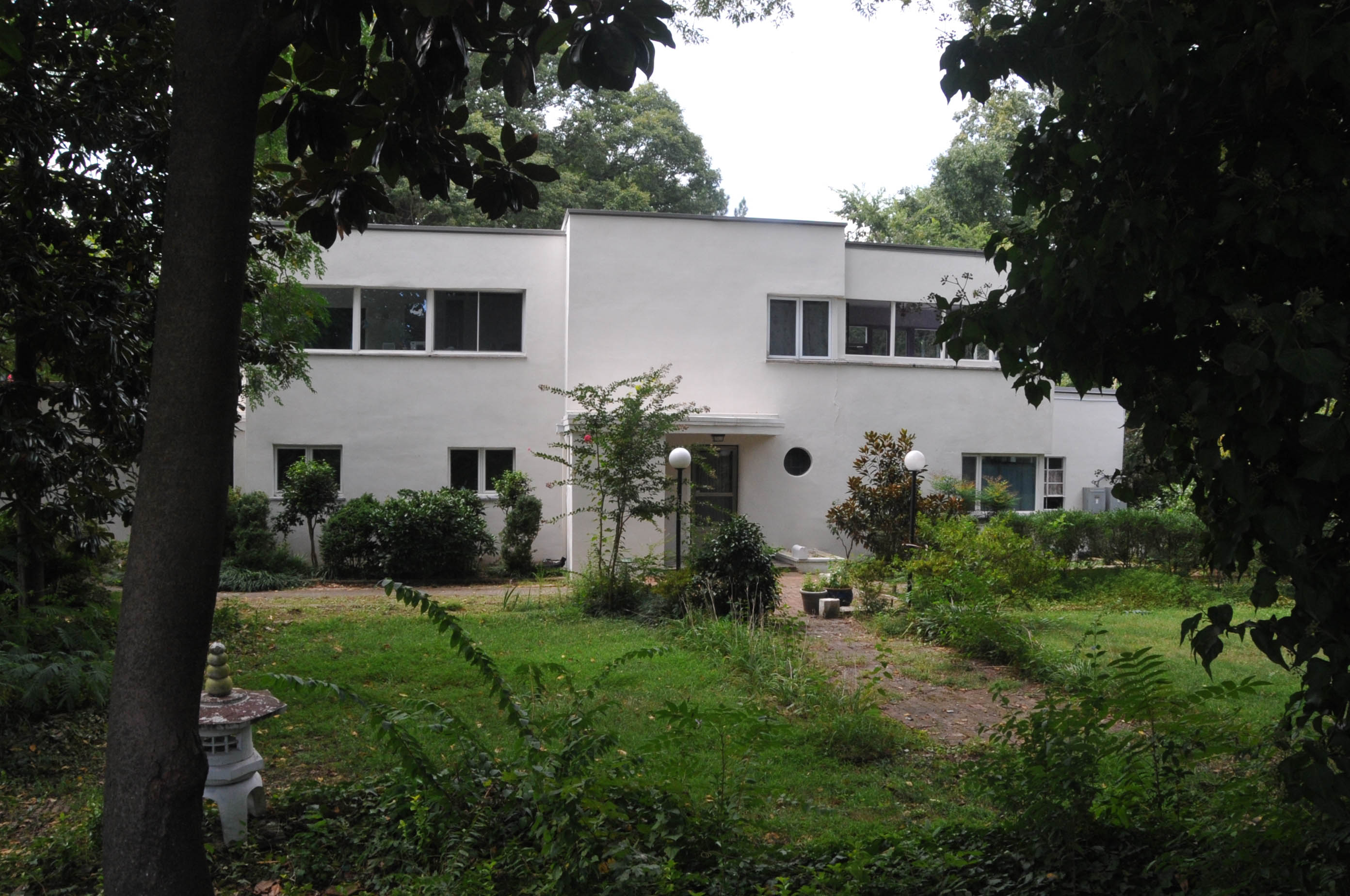
- March 2007

- Location within North Carolina Location within the United States
- Location: 1311 and 1307 N. Mangum St., Durham, North Carolina
- Coordinates: 36°0′32″N 78°53′38″W
- Area: 1.1 acres (0.45 ha)
- Built: 1917
- Architect: Milburn, Heister & Company; Greene & Rogers
- Architectural style: Colonial Revival, International Style
- NRHP reference No.: 79003333
- Added to NRHP: January 19, 1979

Dillard-Gamble Houses are two historic homes located at Durham, Durham County, North Carolina. One house is in the Colonial Revival style and the other is in the International Style.

It was listed on the National Register of Historic Places in 1979.
