= Dead Gentlemen Productions =

American independent film company

- Type: Independent
- Industry: Film
- Founded: 1998
- Headquarters: Tacoma, Washington, US
- Products: motion pictures, film distribution
- Website: http://www.deadgentlemen.com/

Dead Gentlemen Productions is an independent film company based in Seattle, Washington.

They have released a number of films, including the award-winning cult classic The Gamers, The Gamers: Dorkness Rising and The Gamers: Hands of Fate.

All of the films have featured "The Purple Ninja", a ninja wearing purple garbs who is mostly brutally killed during a fight scene. The character is credited as playing himself. While the website implies that The Purple Ninja is a real person of superhuman qualities, the special features for Gamers: Dorkness Rising reveal The Purple Ninja to be Nathan Rice.

== Filmography ==
- Demon Hunters (1999)
- Demon Hunters: Dead Camper Lake (2000)
- The Gamers (2002)
- The Gamers: Dorkness Rising (2008)
- JourneyQuest (2010)
- S.J. Tucker “Playing D&D” Music Video (2011)
- JourneyQuest: Season 2: City of the Dead (2012)
- The Gamers: Hands of Fate (2013)
- The Gamers: Natural One (2013)
- The Gamers: Households & Humans (2013)
- JourneyQuest: Season 3: The Pale Lady (2016)
- The Gamers: The Series (2016)
- The Gamers: The Shadow Menace (2017)
- JourneyQuest Season 3.5 (2018)
