= Seoul International Youth Film Festival =

South Korean film festival

Coordinates: 37°34′N 126°59′E

Seoul International Youth Film Festival (SIYFF) 서울국제청소년영화제
- Location: Seoul, South Korea
- Founded: 1999
- Language: International
- Website: official website

The Seoul International Youth Film Festival (SIYFF) is held annually in Seoul, South Korea, during the summer, and is one of the six major international film festivals in Korea. It has provided a venue for youths to share their culture via films and media education since 1999. It aims to promote broader international exchanges among talented cine kids and establish network to improve their competitiveness in the film industry.

== History ==
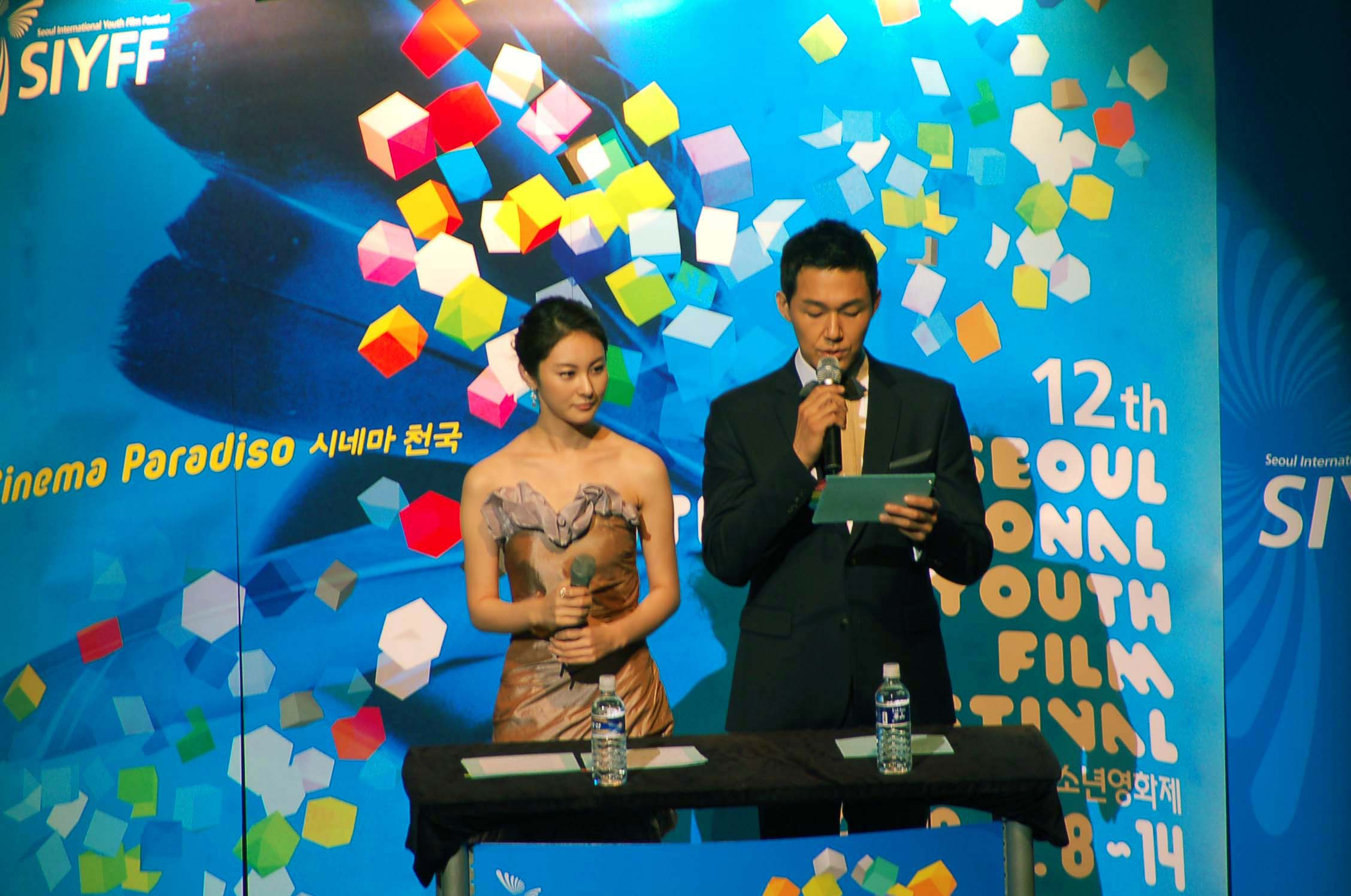
The 12th Seoul International Youth Film Festival hosted by Son Eun-seo and Park Sung-woong

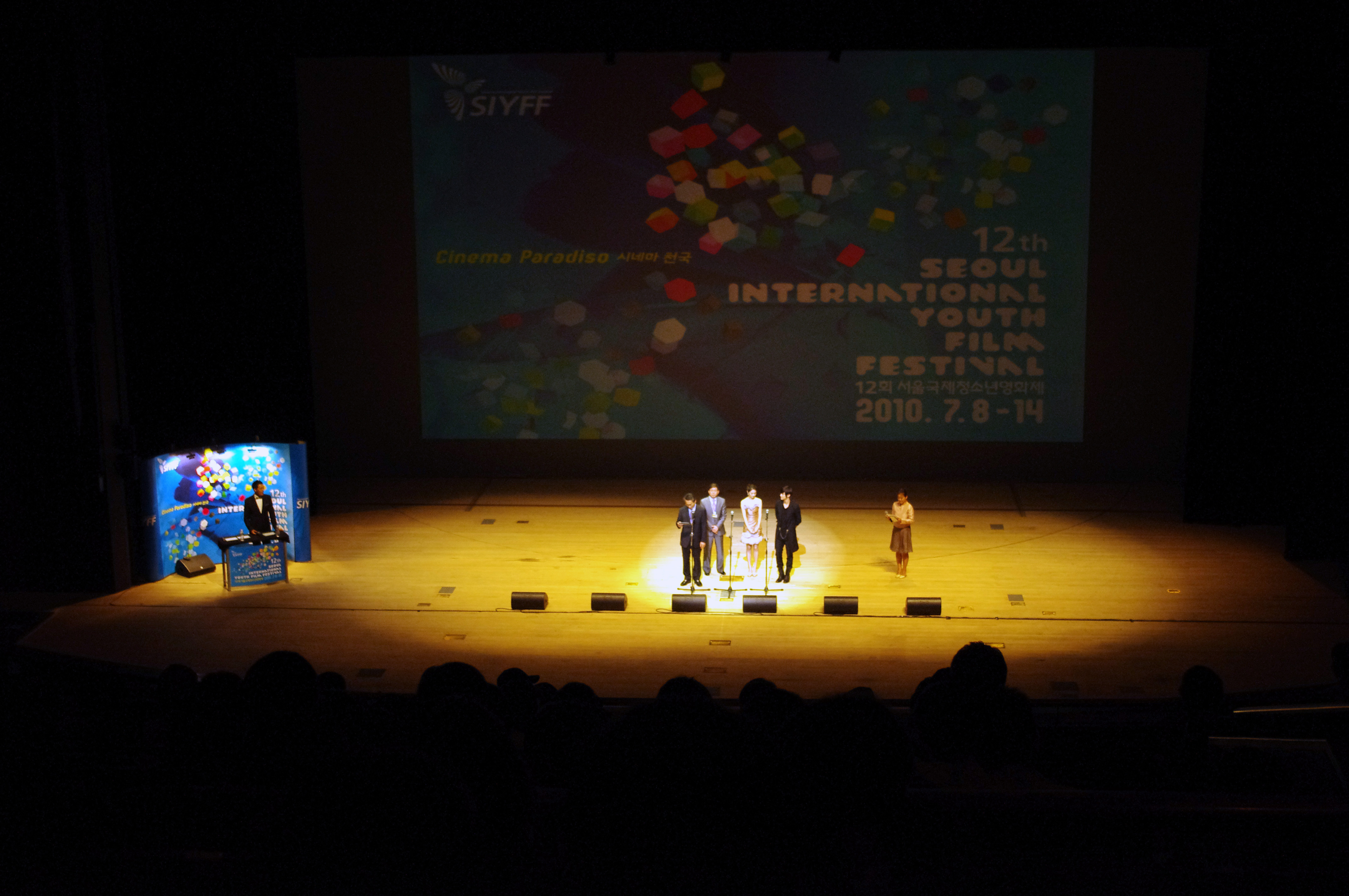
12th SIYFF Opening Ceremony in 2010

Beginning with the inaugural "Video Kids Gather" in 1999, the festival celebrated its 17th anniversary in 2015 and is hosted by the Seoul International Youth Film Festival (SIYFF). It has grown into the largest film festival in Asia, and is a non-competitive festival with a partial competition system, with short films for both adults and youth in the competition section. Through close collaboration with film festivals around the world, the festival introduces excellent international short, coming-of-age, and family films. During the festival, it hosts camps and other events to provide opportunities for youth from around the world to understand and produce films. It also serves to help international youth gain a deeper understanding of Korean culture.

== Competition Section ==
=== Competition 9+ ===
Target
An award given to the best work among the works screened in the children's competition section.
Art Experiment Award
Awarded to works that demonstrate progressive and experimental talent in the visual arts.
Reality Challenge Award
Awarded to works that maintain a sharp perspective on reality and stand out for their challenging spirit.

=== Competition 13+ ===
Target
An award given to the best work among the works screened in the Youth Competition section.
Art Experiment Award
Awarded to works that demonstrate progressive and experimental talent in the visual arts.
Reality Challenge Award
Awarded to works that maintain a sharp perspective on reality and stand out for their challenging spirit.
International Youth Jury Award
Awarded to the best work (competition 13+) selected by the International Youth Jury

=== Competition 19+ ===
Target
An award given to the best work among the works screened in the adult competition section.
Art Experiment Award
Awarded to works that demonstrate progressive and experimental talent in the visual arts.
Reality Challenge Award
Awarded to works that maintain a sharp perspective on reality and stand out for their challenging spirit.

=== Dream Theater ===
This is the section where non-competitive works are screened.

== Related Event ==
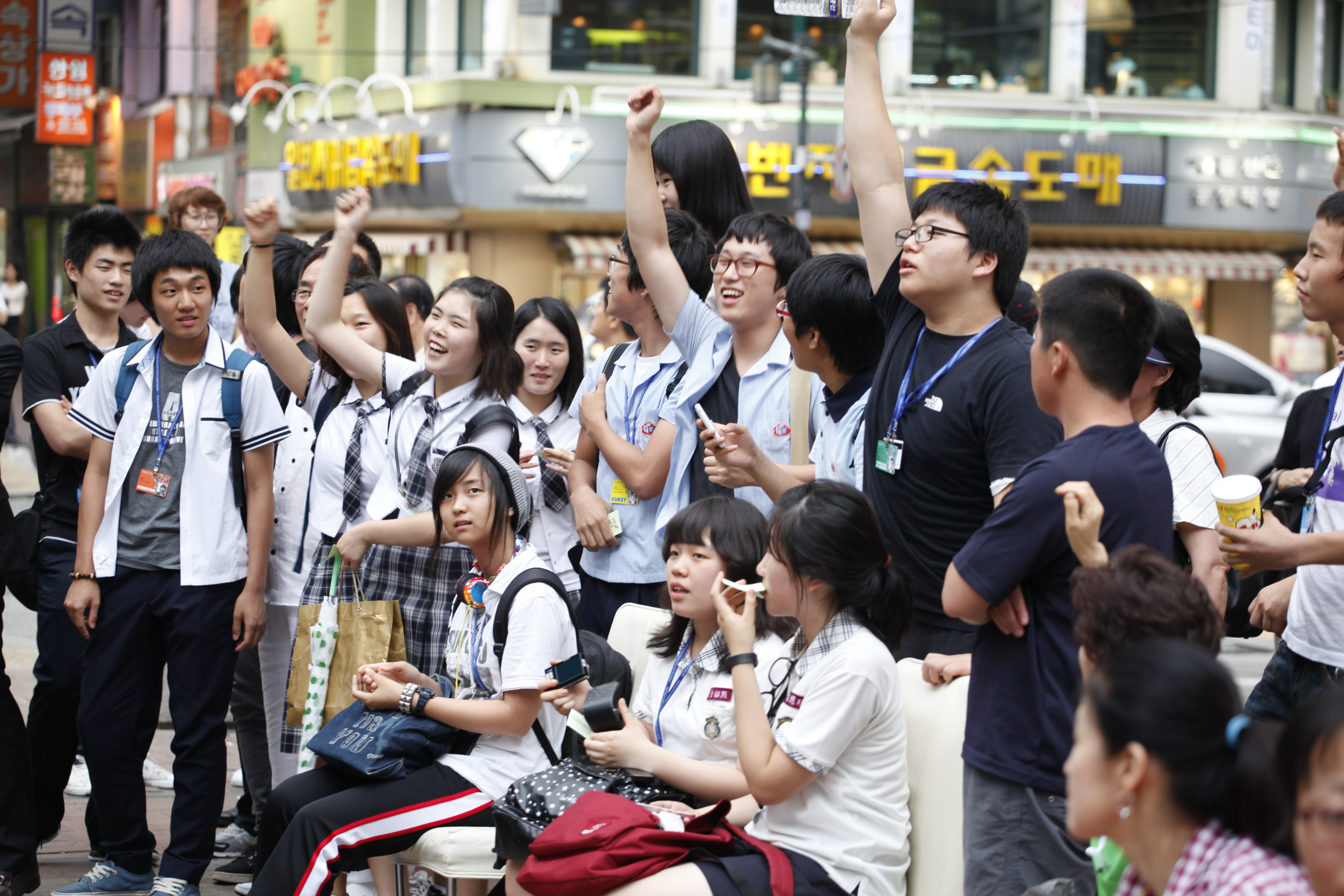
SIYFF side events

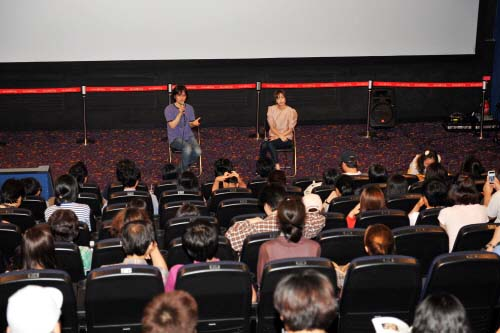
Seoul International Youth Film Festival Cine Talk Talk

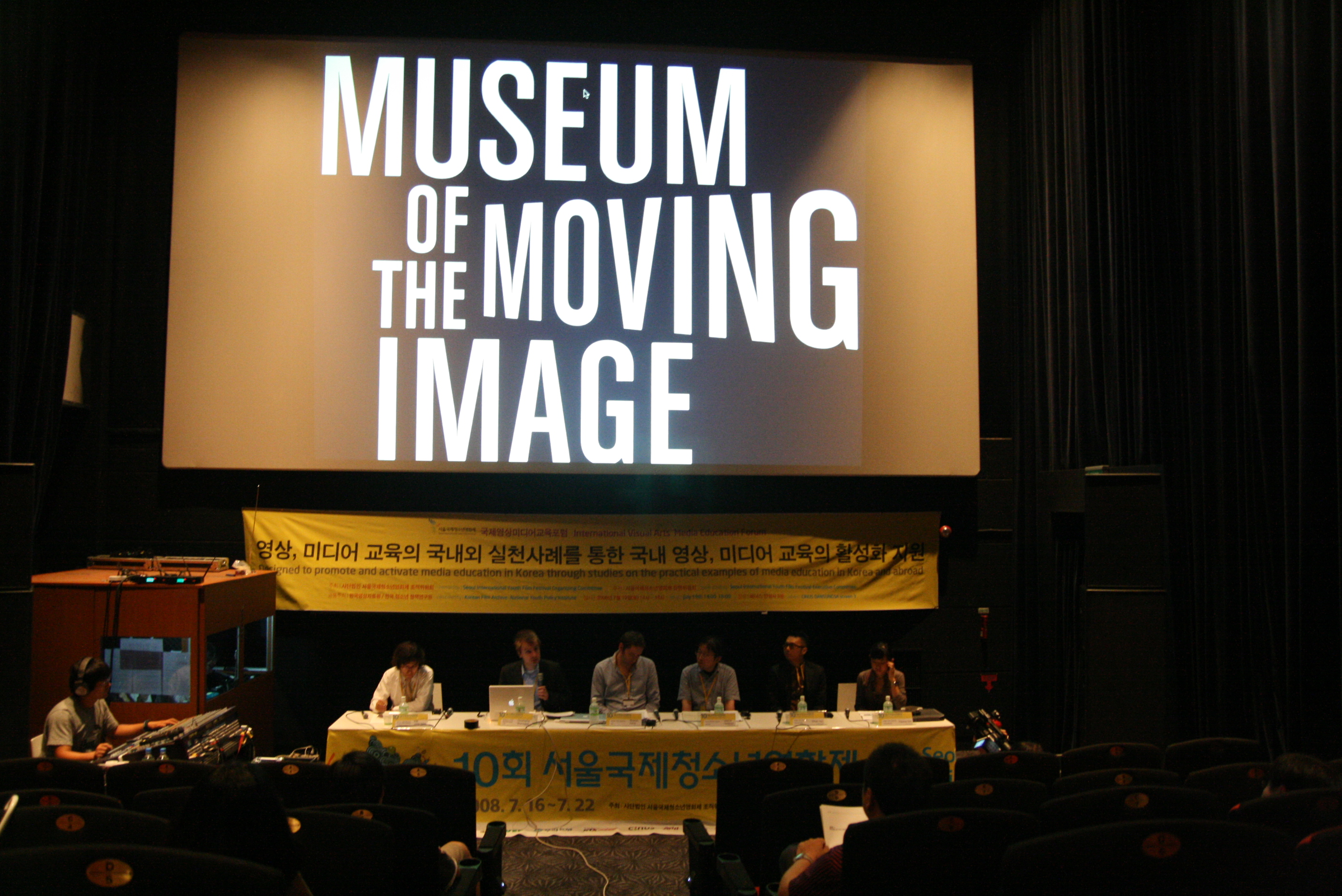
10th Seoul International Youth Film Festival Forum

- International Youth Film Camp: During the festival, youth from around the world gather to attend lectures on practical film theory, watch films, and participate in discussions. Each group gathers ideas, writes a screenplay, and then films the film in various locations around Seoul, with the final film screening in theaters on the final day. All sessions are conducted simultaneously in Korean and English.
- International Media Education Seminar: Inviting practitioners from the film and video education field around the world to share youth media education programs and current status in each region and seek development.
- GV (Guest Visit): Directors and cast members of films screened at the Seoul International Youth Film Festival come on stage to engage in conversations with the audience. After watching a film, you'll hear behind-the-scenes stories, the film's creative intent, and ask questions, deepening your appreciation. Beyond simply watching a film, this is an opportunity to connect with and connect with the original creator. GVs, where you can meet and chat with the director and cast, are a particularly compelling event for film enthusiasts.
- Cine Talk Talk: Chatter from the audience! Unlike the Seoul International Youth Film Festival's Guest Visit (GV) program, where the director, actors, and audience members meet after a film screening, "Cine Talk Talk" features two to three filmmakers, not the director or actors, who watch the film with the audience and engage in a free-spirited "talk show."
- Reading Movie: The Seoul International Youth Film Festival introduced the first Barrier-Free film program in Korea (a movement to eliminate physical and social barriers that hinder the social lives of the socially vulnerable, such as the disabled and the elderly), which garnered an explosive response from parents and children. Now, it's back with an even more enriching program. For the visually impaired, preschoolers, and the elderly who struggle to read the fast-moving subtitles, a professional storyteller accompanies the film from beginning to end, providing an easy and entertaining narration of the film's content. Through Reading Movie, we aim to deliver a joy that goes beyond simply watching a film.
- Street Festival: A festival unique to SIYFF held on the streets during the film festival period.

== See also ==
- List of festivals in South Korea
- List of festivals in Asia
