= FreeNetWorld International Film Fest =

Serbian film festival

FreeNetWorld is an international short film festival held annually in Niš, Niš Fortress, Serbia.

== Awards ==
=== 2012 ===
- The best experimental film of the FNW fest 2012: HAIR – Joao Seica (UK)
- The best animated film of the FNW fest 2012: Howl – Natalie Bettelheim & Sharon Michaeli (ISRAEL)
- The best documentary film of the FNW fest 2012: Bremec – Svetlana Dramlic (SLOVENIA)
- The best fiction film of the FNW fest 2012: 4”13 to KATOWIC – Andrzej Stopa (POLAND)
- The Film of the Festival - FNW Award: Ludzie Normalni - Piotr Zlotorowicz (POLAND)

=== 2011 ===
- FNW Audience award is Dulce by Iván Ruiz Flores.
- The best FNW documentary film is: Machine man by Roser Corella and Alfonso Moral
- The best FNW fiction film is: The Piano by Levon Minasian
- The best FNW animation film is: Amar by Isabel Herguera
- The best experimental film is: Das Heimweh der Feldforscher by Markus Kaatsch
- The best FNW film is: Porque hay cosas que nunca se olvidan by Lucas M. Figueroa

=== 2010 ===
- Special jury award: Ahate pasa - Koldo Almandoz, Spain
- The best fiction: Zwischen licht und schaten– Fabian Giessler, Germany
- The best experimental film: Goodbye Mrs. Ant– Rick Niebe, Italy
- The best documentary film: Dirty Martini - Iban del Campo, Spain
- The best animated film: The Piece - Goran Radovanovanovic, Serbia
- The best FNW film award: ONA- Pau Camarasa, Spain
- Audience award: 5 recuerdos (fiction)- Oriana Alcaine Alejandra Márquez, Spain

=== 2009 ===
- The best documentary film: Asamara - Jon Garaño and Raul Lopez, Spain
- The best animated film: Solitude - Mehrdad Sheikhan, Iran
- The best fiction: So deep in your room - Jacob Mendel, USA
- The best music video: After lie - Velibor Stanojevic and Miodrag Ignjatovic, Serbia
- The most technically innovative film award: The tale of little puppetboy - Johannes Nyholm, Sweden
- The best FNW film award: Asamara - Jon Garaño and Raul Lopez, Spain
- Audience award: Maiden's well (Serbian: Devojački bunar) - Marko Backovic, Serbia

=== 2008 ===
Open Movie Award: David Jakubovic - Joined at the Head, USA

== See also ==
- List of film festivals in Europe
