= Overlapping generations =

In population genetics overlapping generations refers to mating systems where more than one breeding generation is present at any one time. In systems where this is not the case there are non-overlapping generations (or discrete generations) in which every breeding generation lasts just one breeding season. If the adults reproduce over multiple breeding seasons the species is considered to have overlapping generations. Examples of species which have overlapping generations are many mammals, including humans, and many invertebrates in seasonal environments. Examples of species which consist of non-overlapping generations are annual plants and several insect species.

Non-overlapping generations is one of the characteristics that needs to be met in the Hardy–Weinberg model for evolution to occur. This is a very restrictive and unrealistic assumption, but one that is difficult to dispose of.

== Overlapping versus non-overlapping generations ==
In population genetics models, such as the Hardy–Weinberg model, it is assumed that species have no overlapping generations. In nature, however, many species do have overlapping generations. The overlapping generations are considered the norm rather than the exception.

Overlapping generations are found in species that live for many years, and reproduce many times. Many birds, for instance, have new nests every (couple of) year(s). Therefore, the offspring will, after they have matured, also have their own nests of offspring while the parent generation could be breeding again as well. An advantage of overlapping generations can be found in the different experience levels of generations in a population. The younger age group will be able to acquire social information from the older and more experienced age groups. Overlapping generations can, similarly, promote altruistic behaviour.

Non-overlapping generations are found in species in which the adult generation dies after one breeding season. If a species for instance can only survive winter in the juvenile state the species will automatically consist of non-overlapping generations.

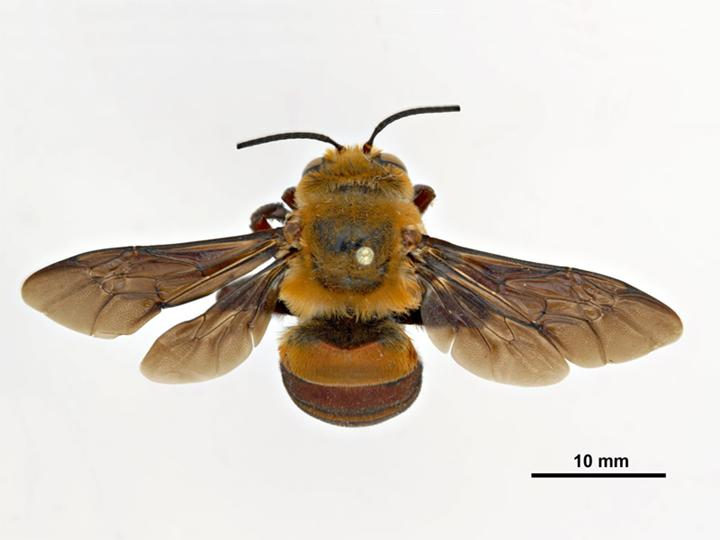
The bee Amegilla dawsoni, an example of a species with non-overlapping generations

The group of species lacking overlapping generations mostly consists of univoltine insects, and some annual plants. One example of univoltine insects, only breeding once a year, is Dawson's burrowing bee, Amegilla dawsoni.

Although annual plants die after one season, not all annual plants truly lack overlapping generations. Many annual plants have seed banks containing dormant seeds that remain dormant for at least one year. This makes overlapping generations possible in annual plants.

N.B domestication of annual plants has led to a reduction of seed dormancy. These domesticated annual plants, therefore, have non-overlapping generations.

== Effects of overlapping generations ==
=== Genetic diversity ===
Whether a species has overlapping generations or not can influence the genetic diversity in the new generation. Changes in the genetic variance in populations due to genetic drift have been shown to be twice as great when there are overlapping generations as opposed to when generations do not overlap.

=== Assumptions in population genetic models ===
Effective population size is an essential concept in evolutionary biology and notoriously hard to estimate. In models estimating this figure, it is often assumed that the species has non-overlapping generations. This can bias the estimate of the effective population size, because temporal fluctuations in allele frequencies follow complicated patterns when generations overlap.

In the Neutral theory of molecular evolution, it is shown that the rate of evolution (substitution rate) in neutral genes is not influenced by fluctuations in population size. This, however, is only true for species having discrete generations. In this case, the substitution rate is equal to the mutation rate. When generation overlapping is incorporated in this model, the substitution rate does change with population size fluctuations. The substitution rate increases when the population size transits from small to large, with a high survival probability and when the population size transits from large to small, with a low survival probability.

=== Experimentation ===
In many experiments species are assumed to only consist of non-overlapping generations. For instance, when a scientist wants to look at genetic mutations in a strain of bacteria. He will look at all the offspring (F1) of the current generation (P). For a further look into genetic mutations in the strain he will then look at the next generation (F2) which consists only of offspring from generation F1 while the first generation P will not be used in the experiment any longer.
