= List of films: N–O =

indexed lists of films
0–9	A	B	C	D	E	F
G	H	I	J–K	L	M	N–O
P	Q–R	S	T	U–V–W	X–Y–Z	

This is an alphabetical list of film articles (or sections within articles about films). It includes made for television films. See the talk page for the method of indexing used.

== N ==
- N. a pris les dés... (1971)
- N - The Madness of Reason (2014)
- N is a Number: A Portrait of Paul Erdős (1993)
- N!ai, the Story of a !Kung Woman (1980)
- NASCAR 3D: The IMAX Experience (2004)
- NCR: Not Criminally Responsible (2013)
- N.G.O (1967)
- NH-8 Road to Nidhivan (2015)
- NH 47 (1984)
- NN (2014)
- NOTA (2018)
- N.T.R: Kathanayakudu (2019)
- N.T.R: Mahanayakudu (2019)
- N.U. (1948)
- NVA (2005)
- NWF Kids Pro Wrestling: The Untold Story (2005)
- The N-Word (2004)
- NY77: The Coolest Year in Hell (2007)
- NYC: Tornado Terror (2008)
- N.Y.H.C. (1999)
- N.Y., N.Y. (1957)

=== Na ===
- Na Band Na Baraati (2018)
- Na białym szlaku (1962)
- Na Bolona (2006)
- Na Ghar Ke Na Ghaat Ke (2010)
- Na Hannyate (2012)
- Na istarski način (1985)
- Na konci města (1955)
- Na Maloom Afraad series:
  - Na Maloom Afraad (2014)
  - Na Maloom Afraad 2 (2017)
- Na Ninna Preetisuve (1986)
- Na odsiecz Wiedniowi (1983)
- Na pytlácké stezce (1979)
- Na růžích ustláno (1935)
- Na Svatém Kopečku (1934)
- Na svoji zemlji (1948)
- Na Tum Jaano Na Hum (2002)
- Na Wewe (2010)

==== Naa ====
- Naa Alludu (2005)
- Naa Autograph (2004)
- Naa Bangaaru Talli (2013)
- Naa Desam (1982)
- Naa Illu (1953)
- Naa Ishtam (2012)
- Naa Mechida Huduga (1972)
- Naa Ninna Bidalaare (1979)
- Naa Ninna Mareyalare (1976)
- Naa... Nuvve (2018)
- Naa Peru Surya (2018)
- Naach (2004)
- Naach Govinda Naach (1992)
- Naach Uthe Sansaar (1976)
- Naache Mayuri (1986)
- Naachiyaar (2018)
- Naadan Pennu (1967)
- Naadan Premam (1972)
- Naadi Aada Janme (1965)
- Naadodigal series:
  - Naadodigal (2009)
  - Naadodigal 2 (2019)
- Naadodikal (1959)
- Naadu Adhai Naadu (1991)
- Naag Nagin (1990)
- Naag aur Nagin (2005)
- Naaga (2003)
- Naaga Nandhini (1961)
- Naagam: (1985 & 1991)
- Naagamalai Azhagi (1962)
- Naagarahaavu (1972)
- Naagu (1984)
- Naai Kutty (2009)
- Naaigal Jaakirathai (2014)
- Naajayaz (1995)
- Naakaa (2018)
- Naal (2018)
- Naalaaga Endaro (1978)
- Naalai (2006)
- Naalai Manithan (1989)
- Naalai Namadhe: (1975 & 2009)
- Naalai Unathu Naal (1984)
- Naalaiya Pozhuthum Unnodu (2007)
- Naalaiya Theerpu (1992)
- Naalaya Seidhi (1992)
- Naale Ennundengil (1990)
- Naale Njangalude Vivaham (1986)
- Naalkavala (1987)
- Naalo Unna Prema (2001)
- Naalu Pennungal (2007)
- Naalu Peruku Nalladhuna Edhuvum Thappilla (2017)
- Naalu Policeum Nalla Irundha Oorum (2015)
- Naalu Veli Nilam (1959)
- Naalum Therindhavan (1968)
- Naalumanippookkal (1978)
- Naalvar (1953)
- Naam: (1953, 1986, 2003 & 2018)
- Naam Gum Jaayega (2005)
- Naam Iruvar: (1947 & 1985)
- Naam Iruvar Namakku Iruvar (1998)
- Naam Moovar (1966)
- Naam O Nishan (1987)
- Naam Pirandha Mann (1977)
- Naam Shabana (2017)
- Naamcheen (1991)
- Naami Chor (1977)
- Naan: (1967 & 2012)
- Naan Aanaiyittal (1966)
- Naan Adimai Illai (1986)
- Naan Aval Adhu (unreleased)
- Naan Avalai Sandhitha Pothu (2019)
- Naan Avanillai: (1974 & 2007)
- Naan Avanillai 2 (2009)
- Naan Kadavul (2009)
- Naan Kanda Sorgam (1960)
- Naan Mahaan Alla: (1984 & 2010)
- Naan Paadum Paadal (1984)
- Naan Pesa Ninaipathellam (1993)
- Naan Petha Magane (1995)
- Naan Petra Selvam (1956)
- Naan Potta Savaal (1980)
- Naan Rajavaga Pogiren (2013)
- Naan Sigappu Manithan: (1985 & 2014)
- Naan Sollum Ragasiyam (1959)
- Naan Sonnathey Sattam (1988)
- Naan Thaan Siva (2013)
- Naan Than Bala (2014)
- Naan Ungal Thozhan (1978)
- Naan Valartha Thangai (1958)
- Naan Vanangum Dheivam (1963)
- Naan Vazhavaippen (1979)
- Naan Yen Pirandhen (1972)
- Naanal (1965)
- Naanayam: (1983 & 2010)
- Naandhi (2021)
- Naandi (1964)
- Naane Bhagyavati (1968)
- Naane Ennul Illai (2010)
- Naane Raja: (1956 & 1984)
- Naane Raja Naane Mandhiri (1985)
- Naane Varuven (1992)
- Naanga (2012)
- Naanga Romba Busy (2020)
- Naangal (1992)
- Naangu Killadigal (1969)
- Naangu Suvargal (1971)
- Naani (2004)
- Naanna Nenu Naa Boyfriends (2016)
- Naanu Avanalla...Avalu (2015)
- Naanu Mattu Varalakshmi (2016)
- Naanu Naane (2002)
- Naanu Nanna Hendthi (1985)
- Naanu Nanna Kanasu (2010)
- Naanum Indha Ooruthan (1990)
- Naanum Oru Penn (1963)
- Naanum Oru Thozhilali (1986)
- Naanum Rowdy Dhaan (2015)
- Naaraayam (1993)
- Narappa (2021)
- Naari (1963)
- Naariya Seere Kadda (2010)
- Naatak (1947)
- Naattiya Rani (1949)
- Naatukoru Nallaval (1959)
- Naaummeedhu (2001)
- Naavadakku Paniyedukku (1985)
- Naayak (2013)
- Naayattu (1980)
- Naayi Neralu (2006)
- Naayika (2011)
- Naayudamma (2006)

==== Nab–Naf ====
- Nabab (2016)
- Nabab LLB (2020)
- Nabab Nandini (2007)
- Nabat (2014)
- Nabbie's Love (1999)
- Nabi (2001)
- Nabin Jatra (1953)
- The Nabob Affair (1960)
- Nabonga (1944)
- Nace un campeón (1952)
- Nachavule (2008)
- Nache Nagin Gali Gali (1989)
- Nacher Putul (1971)
- Nacho Libre (2006)
- Nacholer Rani (2006)
- Nachom-ia Kumpasar (2015)
- Nachtrit (2006)
- Nachtvlinder (1999)
- Nacidos para cantar (1965)
- Nad Niemnem (1986)
- Nada: (1947 & 1974)
- Nada más que amor (1942)
- Nada Sōsō (2006)
- Nada Untuk Asa (2015)
- Nada's Revolution (2015)
- Nadaan: (1943 & 1971)
- Nadakame Ulakam (2011)
- Nadan (2013)
- Nadan Pennum Natupramaniyum (2000)
- Nadhi Karaiyinile (2003)
- Nadhiyai Thedi Vandha Kadal (1980)
- Nadi Theke Sagare (1978)
- Nadi Vahate (2017)
- Nadia (1984)
- Nadia, Butterfly (2020)
- Nadia and the Hippos (1999)
- Nadia's Friends (2006)
- Nadie dijo nada (1971)
- Nadie oyó gritar (1973)
- Nadie oyó gritar a Cecilio Fuentes (1965)
- Nadie te querra como yo (1972)
- Nadigai (2008)
- Nadigan (1990)
- Nadina Bhagya (1970)
- Nadine (1987)
- Nadiya Ke Paar: (1948 & 1982)
- Nadiya Kollappetta Rathri (2007)
- Nadja (1994)
- Nadodi (1966)
- Nadodi Mannan: (1958 & 1995)
- Nadodi Pattukkaran (1992)
- Nadodi Raja (1982)
- Nadodi Thendral (1992)
- Nadodikkattu (1987)
- Nadodimannan (2013)
- Nadu Iravil (1970)
- Nadunisi Naaygal (2011)
- Naduvazhikal (1989)
- Naduve Antaravirali (2018)
- Naduvula Konjam Pakkatha Kaanom (2012)
- Nae Pasaran (2018)
- Nafrat Ki Aandhi (1989)
- Nafrathu (1994)
- Nafrathuvumun (2019)

==== Nag ====
- Naga Kala Bhairava (1981)
- Naga Kanya (2007)
- Naga Panjami (1956)
- Naga Story: The Other Side of Silence (2003)
- Nagabonar (1987)
- Nagabonar Jadi 2 (2007)
- Nagai Go no Kowai Zone: Kaiki (1989)
- Nagai Go no Kowai Zone 2: Senki (1990)
- Nagai Go World: Maboroshi Panty VS Henchin Pokoider (2004)
- Nagalingam (2000)
- Nagalit ang Buwan sa Haba ng Gabi (1983)
- Nagamadathu Thampuratti (1982)
- Nagamandala (1997)
- The Nagano Tapes: Rewound, Replayed & Reviewed (2018)
- Nagara Varidhi Naduvil Njan (2014)
- Nagaradalli Nayakaru (1992)
- Nagarahavu: (2002 & 2016)
- Nagarahole (1977)
- Nagaram: (2007 & 2008)
- Nagaram Marupakkam (2010)
- Nagaram Nidrapotunna Vela (2009)
- Nagaram Sagaram (1974)
- Nagarame Nandi (1967)
- Nagarangalil Chennu Raparkam (1990)
- Nagarathil Samsara Vishayam (1991)
- Nagaravadhu (2001)
- Nagarjuna (1961)
- Nagasaki: Memories of My Son (2015)
- Nagavalli (2010)
- Nagesh Thiraiyarangam (2018)
- Nagin: (1954, 1976 & 2010)
- Nagin Aur Lootere (1992)
- Nagin Aur Suhagin (1979)
- Nagina (1986)
- Naglalayag (2004)
- Nagmoti (1983)
- Nagna Sathyam (1979)
- Naguva Hoovu (1971)

==== Nah–Naj ====
- Nahanni (1962)
- Nahid (2015)
- Nahla (1979)
- Nahuel and the Magic Book (2020)
- Nai Duniya (1942)
- Nai Duniya Naye Log (1973)
- Nai Kahani (1943)
- Nai Maa (1946)
- Nai Nabhannu La (2014)
- Nai Nabhannu La 4 (2016)
- Nai Nabhannu La 5 (2018)
- Nai Roshni: (1941 & 1967)
- Nai Umar Ki Nai Fasal (1966)
- Nai Zindagi (1943)
- The Nail (1944)
- The Nail: The Story of Joey Nardone (2009)
- Nail in the Boot (1931)
- Nail Gun Massacre (1985)
- Nail Polish (2021)
- Nailbiter (2013)
- Nails: (1979, 1992, 2003 & 2017)
- Naina: (1973, 2002 & 2005)
- Nainsukh (2010)
- Nair Saab (1989)
- Nairu Pidicha Pulivalu (1958)
- Naiyaandi (2013)
- Najangalude Kochu Doctor (1989)
- Najma: (1943 & 1983)

==== Nak ====
- Nak (2008)
- Nakagawa Jun Kyōju no Inbina Hibi (2008)
- Naked: (1993, 2002, 2013 & 2017)
- Naked Africa (1957)
- Naked Alibi (1954)
- Naked Amazon (1954)
- Naked Ambition (2003)
- Naked Ambition 2 (2014)
- Naked Ambition: An R Rated Look at an X Rated Industry (2009)
- Naked Among Wolves: (1963 & 2015)
- Naked Angel (2011)
- The Naked Angel (1946)
- Naked Angels (1969)
- The Naked Ape (1973)
- Naked Blood (1996)
- Naked Boys Singing! (2007)
- The Naked Brigade (1965)
- The Naked Brothers Band: The Movie (2005)
- The Naked Bunyip (1970)
- The Naked Cage (1986)
- Naked Campus (1982)
- Naked Childhood (1968)
- The Naked City (1948)
- Naked City: Justice with a Bullet (1998)
- The Naked Civil Servant (1975)
- The Naked Country (1985)
- The Naked Dawn (1955)
- The Naked and the Dead (1958)
- The Naked DJ (2014)
- The Naked Earth (1958)
- The Naked Edge (1961)
- Naked Evil (1966)
- The Naked Eye: (1956 & 1998)
- The Naked Face (1984)
- Naked Fame (2005)
- The Naked Feminist (2004)
- Naked Fury (1959)
- Naked Girl Killed in the Park (1972)
- Naked Gun (1956)
- Naked Gun series:
  - The Naked Gun: From the Files of Police Squad! (1988)
  - The Naked Gun 2½: The Smell of Fear (1991)
  - Naked Gun 33 1/3: The Final Insult (1994)
  - The Naked Gun (2025)
- Naked Harbour (2012)
- The Naked Heart (1950)
- Naked Hearts: (1916 & 1966)
- The Naked Hills (1956)
- The Naked Hours (1964)
- The Naked Island (1962)
- The Naked Jungle (1954)
- Naked Killer (1992)
- The Naked Kiss (1964)
- The Naked Kitchen (2009)
- Naked Lunch (1991)
- The Naked Maja (1958)
- The Naked Man: (1923 & 1998)
- Naked Massacre (1976)
- The Naked Monster (2005)
- Naked in New York (1992)
- Naked Obsession (1990)
- Naked Paradise (1957)
- The Naked Prey (1965)
- The Naked Proof (2003)
- The Naked Runner (1967)
- Naked Sea (1954)
- Naked Soldier (2012)
- Naked Souls (1996)
- The Naked Spur (1953)
- The Naked Street (1955)
- Naked Sun (1958)
- Naked in the Sun (1957)
- Naked Tango (1991)
- Naked Therapy (1975)
- The Naked Truth: (1914, 1932, 1957 & 1992)
- Naked Vengeance (1985)
- Naked Violence (1969)
- Naked Weapon (2002)
- The Naked Witch (1964)
- The Naked Woman and the Gun (1957)
- The Naked World of Harrison Marks (1967)
- Naked Yoga (1974)
- Naked Youth (1961)
- The Naked Zoo (1970)
- Naken (2000)
- Nakhakshathangal (1986)
- Nakhangal: (1973 & 2013)
- Nakharam (2011)
- Nakhuda (1981)
- Nakili Manishi (1980)
- Nakkare Ade Swarga (1967)
- Nakom (2016)
- Nakshathragal Parayathirunnathu (2000)
- Nakshathrakkannulla Rajakumaran Avanundoru Rajakumari (2002)
- Nakshathrangale Kaaval (1978)
- Nakshatra (2010)
- Nakshatram (2017)
- Nakshatratharattu (1998)
- Naku Penta Naku Taka (2014)

==== Nal ====
- Nala Damayanthi: (1959 & 2003)
- Nalanum Nandhiniyum (2014)
- Nalayak (1978)
- Nalini by Day, Nancy by Night (2005)
- Nalla (2004)
- Nalla Idathu Sammandham (1958)
- Nalla Kaalam Porandaachu (1990)
- Nalla Manasukkaran (1997)
- Nalla Naal (1984)
- Nalla Neram (1972)
- Nam's Angels (1970)
- Namak Haraam (1973)
- Nalla Thambi (1985)
- Nalla Thangai (1955)
- Nalla Thangal (1955)
- Nalla Thanka (1950)
- Nalla Theerpu (1959)
- Nalla Veedu (1956)
- Nallakalam (1954)
- Nallathai Naadu Kekum (1991)
- Nallathambi (1949)
- Nallathe Nadakkum (1993)
- Nallathoru Kudumbam (1979)
- Nallavan: (1955, 1988 & 2010)
- Nallavan Vazhvan (1961)
- Nallavanukku Nallavan (1984)
- Nalugu Stambhalata (1982)
- Nalvaravu (1964)

==== Nam ====
- Nam Duniya Nam Style (2013)
- Nam Kuzhandai (1955)
- Nam Naadu: (1969 & 2007)
- Nam's Angels (1970)
- Namak (1996)
- Namak Halaal (1982)
- Namak Haraam (1973)
- Namaste England (2018)
- Namaste Madam (2014)
- Namastey London (2007)
- Namasthe Bali (2015)
- Namath: From Beaver Falls to Broadway (2012)
- Namatjira the Painter (1947)
- Nambinar Keduvathillai (1986)
- Nambiyaar (2016)
- Nambugun (1990)
- Namdev Bhau: In Search of Silence (2018)
- A Name for Evil (1973)
- Name the Man (1924)
- The Name of the Rose (1986)
- Nameless (1923)
- The Nameless (1999)
- A Nameless Band (1982)
- Nameless Gangster: Rules of the Time (2012)
- Nameless Heroes (1925)
- The Nameless Knight (1970)
- Nameless Men (1928)
- Nameless Star (1979)
- Nameless Woman (1927)
- The Names of Love (2010)
- Names in Marble (2002)
- The Namesake (2006)
- Nami (1951)
- Namibia: The Struggle for Liberation (2007)
- Namitha I Love You (2011)
- Namiya (2017)
- Namkeen (1982)
- Namma Annachi (1994)
- Namma Basava (2005)
- Namma Kuzhandaigal (1970)
- Namma Makkalu (1969)
- Namma Ooru Mariamma (1991)
- Namma Ooru Nalla Ooru (1986)
- Namma Ooru Nayagan (1988)
- Namma Ooru Poovatha (1990)
- Namma Ooru Raasa (1996)
- Namma Preethiya Ramu (2003)
- Namma Samsara (1971)
- Namma Veettu Lakshmi (1966)
- Namma Veetu Kalyanam (2002)
- Nammal (2002)
- Nammal Thammil (2009)
- Nammanna (2005)
- Nammanna Don (2012)
- Nammavar (1994)
- Namme (2017)
- Nammina Bantu (1960)
- Nammoora Hammera (1990)
- Nammoora Mandara Hoove (1997)
- Nammoora Raja (1988)
- Nammude Naadu (1990)
- Namo Bhootatma (2014)
- Namo Venkatesa (2010)
- Namte Namte (2013)
- Namu, the Killer Whale (1966)
- Namukku Parkkan (2012)
- Namukku Parkkan Munthirithoppukal (1986)
- Namus (1925)

==== Nan ====
- Nan Hendthi Chennagidale (2000)
- Nan Love Track (2016)
- Nan of Music Mountain (1917)
- Nan of the North (1922)
- Nan O' the Backwoods (1915)
- Nana: (1926, 1934, 1944, 1955, 1985 & 2005)
- Nana 2 (2006)
- Nana - A Tale of Us (2017)
- Nana to Kaoru series:
  - Nana to Kaoru (2011)
  - Nana to Kaoru: Chapter 2 (2012)
- Nana Means King (2015)
- Nana, the True Key of Pleasure (1982)
- Nanak Nam Jahaz Hai (1969)
- Nanak Shah Fakir (2018)
- Nanayam (1983)
- Nanba Nanba (2002)
- Nanban: (1954 & 2012)
- Nanbanin Kadhali (2007)
- Nanbargal (1991)
- Nance (1920)
- Nancy (2018)
- Nancy Bikin Pembalesan (1930)
- Nancy Drew: (2002 TV & 2007)
- Nancy Drew... Detective (1938)
- Nancy Drew and the Hidden Staircase: (1939 & 2019)
- Nancy Drew... Reporter (1939)
- Nancy Drew... Trouble Shooter (1939)
- Nancy Goes to Rio (1950)
- Nancy from Nowhere (1922)
- Nancy, Please (2012)
- Nanda (2009)
- Nanda Deepa (1963)
- Nanda Gokula (1972)
- Nanda Loves Nanditha (2008)
- Nandakumar (1938)
- Nandalala (2010)
- Nandanam (2002)
- Nandanar (1942)
- Nandanavanam 120km (2006)
- Nandeeswarudu (2012)
- Nandhaa (2001)
- Nandhavana Theru (1995)
- Nandhi: (2002 & 2011)
- Nandhini (1997)
- Nandi Veendum Varika (1986)
- Nandini I Love U (2008)
- Nandini Oppol (1994)
- Nandito Ako Nagmamahal Sa'Yo (2009)
- Nandri (1984)
- Nandri, Meendum Varuga (1982)
- Nandu (1981)
- Nanendu Nimmavane (1993)
- Nanette (1940)
- Nanette Makes Everything (1926)
- Nanette of the Wilds (1916)
- Nang Iniwan Mo Ako (1997)
- Nang Mahawi ang Ulap (1940)
- Nang Nak (1999)
- Nanga Parbat (2010)
- Nangal Puthiyavargal (1990)
- Nangna Kappa Pakchade (2013)
- Nangna Nokpa Yengningi (2015)
- Nangoku no hada (1952)
- Naniruvude Ninagagi (1979)
- Nanjundi (2003)
- Nanjundi Kalyana (1989)
- Nanjupuram (2011)
- Nankana (2018)
- Nanking: (1938 & 2007)
- Nanma (2007)
- Nanna Kartavya (1965)
- Nanna Ninna Prema Kathe (2016)
- Nanna Prathigne (1985)
- Nanna Prayaschittha (1978)
- Nanna Preethiya Hudugi (2001)
- Nanna Rosha Nooru Varusha (1980)
- Nanna Shathru (1992)
- Nanna Thamma (1970)
- Nannaku Prematho (2016)
- Nannambikkai (1956)
- Nannavanu (2010)
- Nannbenda (2015)
- Nannu Dochukunduvate (2018)
- Nanny (2022)
- The Nanny: (1965 & 1999)
- A Nanny for Christmas (2010)
- The Nanny Diaries (2007)
- Nanny McPhee (2005)
- Nanny McPhee and the Big Bang (2010)
- Nanny and the Professor (1972)
- Nanobba Kalla (1979)
- Nanon: (1924 & 1938)
- Nanook of the North (1922)
- Nanou (1986)
- Nanu Ki Jaanu (2018)

==== Nao–Naq ====
- Naomi and Ely's No Kiss List (2015)
- Naomi & Wynonna: Love Can Build a Bridge (1995)
- The Napa Boys (2026)
- Naples in Green and Blue (1935)
- Naples of Olden Times (1938)
- Naples is a Song (1927)
- Naples Sings (1953)
- Naples Will Never Die (1939)
- Napló apámnak, anyámnak (1990)
- Napoleon: (1927, 1951, 1955, 1995, 2007 TV & 2023)
- Napoléon II l'Aiglon (1961)
- Napoleon Bunny-Part (1956)
- Napoleon Dynamite (2004)
- Napoleon Is to Blame for Everything (1938)
- Napoleon and Josephine: A Love Story (1987)
- Napoleon and Me (2006)
- Napoleon Road (1953)
- Napoleon and Samantha (1972)
- Napoleon and the Little Washerwoman (1920)
- Napoleon at Saint Helena (1929)
- Napoleon's Barber (1928)
- Napoleon's Daughter (1922)
- Napoli, Napoli, Napoli (2009)
- Napoli piange e ride (1954)
- Napoli velata (2017)
- Napoli violenta (1976)
- Nappily Ever After (2018)
- Napping Princess (2017)
- Naqaab: (2007 & 2018)
- Naqab (1955)
- Naqoyqatsi (2002)

==== Nar ====
- Narada Vijaya (1980)
- Naradhan Keralathil (1987)
- Naragasooran (TBD)
- Narakasuran (2006)
- Naram Garam (1981)
- Naramsimha (1991)
- Naran (2005)
- Naranathu Thampuran (2001)
- Narasimha: (2001 & 2012)
- Narasimha Naidu (2001)
- Narasimham (2000)
- Narasimhudu (2005)
- Narasinha Avatar (1949)
- Narathan (2016)
- Narayana Saw Me (2015)
- Narc (2002)
- Narciso's Hard Luck (1940)
- Narcissus: (1983, 2012 & 2015)
- Narcissus and Psyche (1980)
- Narco (2004)
- Narco Cultura (2013)
- Narcopolis (2015)
- Narcotics (1932)
- The Narcotics Story (1958)
- Narendran Makan Jayakanthan Vaka (2001)
- Nargess (1992)
- Nargis (1946)
- Nari (1942)
- Nari Munidare Mari (1972)
- Nari Nari Naduma Murari (1990)
- Nariman (2001)
- Narito ang Puso Ko (1992)
- Narmada: A Valley Rises (1994)
- A Narmada Diary (1995)
- Narradores de Javé (2003)
- The Narrow Corner (1933)
- Narrow Margin (1990)
- The Narrow Margin (1952)
- The Narrow Path: (1918 & 2006)
- The Narrow Road: (1912 & 2022)
- The Narrow Street (1925)
- The Narrow Trail (1917)
- The Narrow Valley (1921)
- The Narrowing Circle (1956)
- The Narrows (2008)
- Narsi Bhagat (1940)
- Narsimha (1991)
- Narsinh Mehta (1932)
- Nartaki: (1940 & 1963)
- Nartanasala: (1963 & 2018)
- Narthagi (2011)
- Naruda Donoruda (2016)
- Naruto series:
  - Naruto the Movie: Ninja Clash in the Land of Snow (2004)
  - Naruto the Movie: Legend of the Stone of Gelel (2005)
  - Naruto the Movie: Guardians of the Crescent Moon Kingdom (2006)
  - Naruto Shippuden the Movie (2007)
  - Naruto Shippuden the Movie: Bonds (2008)
  - Naruto Shippuden the Movie: The Will of Fire (2009)
  - Naruto Shippuden the Movie: The Lost Tower (2010)
  - Naruto the Movie: Blood Prison (2011)
  - Road to Ninja: Naruto the Movie (2012)
  - The Last: Naruto the Movie (2014)
  - Boruto: Naruto the Movie (2015)
- Narvik (2023)

==== Nas ====
- Nas: Time Is Illmatic (2014)
- Nasaan si Francis? (2006)
- Nasaan Ka Man (2005)
- Nasbandi (1978)
- Naseeb: (1981 & 1997)
- Naseeb Apna Apna: (1970 & 1986)
- Naseem (1995)
- Naseem (2023)
- Nasha (2013)
- Nashebaaz (2016)
- Nashibvaan (2019)
- Nashville (1975)
- Nashville Girl (1976)
- Nashville Rebel (1966)
- Nashville Rises (2011)
- Nasi Lemak 2.0 (2011)
- Nasib Si Labu Labi (1963)
- Nasrani (2007)
- Nasser 56 (1996)
- Nastasja (1994)
- Nastik: (1954 & 1983)
- Nasty Baby (2015)
- Nasty Boys (1989 TV)
- Nasty Burgers (1993)
- The Nasty Girl (1990)
- Nasty Habits (1977)
- Nasty Love (1995)
- Nasty Old People (2009)
- Nasty Quacks (1945)
- The Nasty Rabbit (1964)
- Nasu: Summer in Andalusia (2003)

==== Nat ====
- Nat Khat Mhar Tae Tite Pwal (2015)
- Nat Phat Tae Sone Twal Myar (2010)
- Nat Pinkerton in the Fight (1920)
- Nat Turner: A Troublesome Property (2003)
- Nata Sarvabhouma (1968)
- Natacha Atlas, la rose pop du Caire (2007)
- Natakala Rayudu (1969)
- Natakam (2018)
- Natale a Beverly Hills (2009)
- Natale a Londra – Dio salvi la regina (2016)
- Natale a Miami (2005)
- Natale a New York (2006)
- Natale sul Nilo (2002)
- Natale a Rio (2008)
- Natale a cinque stelle (2018)
- Natale col Boss (2015)
- Natale da chef (2017)
- Natale in India (2003)
- Natale in Sudafrica (2010)
- Natale in crociera (2007)
- Natalee Holloway (2009)
- Natalia (1988)
- Natalie (2010)
- Natalie Wood: What Remains Behind (2020)
- Natannethuwa Dinna (2016)
- Natasaarvabhowma (2019)
- Natasha: (1974, 2001 & 2015)
- Natchathira Nayagan (1992)
- Natchathiram (1980)
- Natchathiram Nagargiradhu (2022)
- Natchatra Kadhal (2001)
- Natchez Trace (1960)
- Nate and the Colonel (2003)
- Nate and Hayes (1983)
- Nate & Margaret (2012)
- Nathalie (1957)
- Nathalie... (2003)
- Nathalie, Secret Agent (1959)
- Nathan the Wise (1922)
- Nathayil Muthu (1973)
- Nathi Bari Tarzan (2019)
- Nathi Muthal Nathi Vare (1983)
- Nathicharami (2018)
- Natholi Oru Cheriya Meenalla (2013)
- Nathoon (1974)
- Nati (2014)
- Nati stanchi (2002)
- Nation Aflame (1937)
- Nation and Destiny series (1992–2002)
- Nation Estate (2013)
- A Nation Is Built (1938)
- Nation Under Siege (2013)
- National Anthem: (2003 & 2023)
- The National Anthem (1999)
- The National Barn Dance (1944)
- National Bird (2016)
- National Bomb (2004)
- National Champions (2021)
- National Customs (1935)
- The National Health (1973)
- National Lampoon series:
  - National Lampoon Presents Dorm Daze (2003)
  - National Lampoon: Drunk Stoned Brilliant Dead (2015)
  - National Lampoon's Adam & Eve (2005)
  - National Lampoon's Animal House (1978)
  - National Lampoon's Bag Boy (2007)
  - National Lampoon's Barely Legal (2003)
  - National Lampoon's Christmas Vacation (1989)
  - National Lampoon's Christmas Vacation 2: Cousin Eddie's Island Adventure (2003) (TV)
  - National Lampoon's Class Reunion (1982)
  - National Lampoon's Dorm Daze 2 (2006)
  - National Lampoon's European Vacation (1985)
  - National Lampoon's Gold Diggers (2003)
  - National Lampoon's Golf Punks (1998)
  - National Lampoon's Last Resort (1994)
  - National Lampoon's Loaded Weapon 1 (1993)
  - National Lampoon's Movie Madness (1982)
  - National Lampoon's Pledge This! (2006)
  - National Lampoon's Pucked (2006)
  - National Lampoon's Senior Trip (1995)
  - National Lampoon's Thanksgiving Family Reunion (2003)
  - National Lampoon's TV: The Movie (2006)
  - National Lampoon's Vacation (1983)
  - National Lampoon's Van Wilder (2002)
  - National Lampoon's Van Wilder: The Rise of Taj (2006)
  - National Lampoon's Van Wilder: Freshman Year (2009)
  - Vegas Vacation (1997)
- National Mechanics (1972)
- National Security: (2003 & 2012)
- National Treasure series:
  - National Treasure (2004)
  - National Treasure: Book of Secrets (2007)
- The National Tree (2009)
- National Velvet (1944)
- Natir Puja (1932)
- Native (2016)
- Native Land (1942)
- Native New Yorker (2006)
- Native Son: (1951, 1986, 2010 & 2019)
- Nativity series:
  - Nativity! (2009)
  - Nativity 2: Danger in the Manger (2012)
  - Nativity 3: Dude, Where's My Donkey? (2014)
  - Nativity Rocks! (2018)
- The Nativity (1978 TV)
- The Nativity Story (2006)
- Natkhat (2020)
- Natpadhigaram 79 (2016)
- Natpe Thunai (2019)
- Natpu (1986)
- Natpukkaga (1998)
- Natpuna Ennanu Theriyuma (2019)
- Natsamrat: (2016 & 2018)
- Natsume's Book of Friends: The Waking Rock and the Strange Visitor (2021)
- Natsume's Book of Friends the Movie: Tied to the Temporal World (2018)
- Nattamai (1994)
- Nattami Army (2023)
- Nattbuss 807 (1997)
- Nattuchakkeruttu (1980)
- Nattukku Oru Nallavan (1991)
- Nattupura Nayagan (1997)
- Nattupura Pattu (1996)
- Natturajavu (2004)
- Natura contro (1988)
- The Natural (1984)
- A Natural Born Gambler (1916)
- Natural Born Killers (1994)
- Natural Born Pranksters (2016)
- Natural Causes: (1985 & 1994)
- Natural City (2003)
- Natural Enemies (1979)
- The Natural History of Parking Lots (1990)
- Natural Justice: Heat (1996 TV)
- Natural Light (2021)
- A Natural Man (1915)
- Natural Selection: (2011 & 2016)
- Naturally Free (1974)
- Naturally Native (1998)
- Naturally Obsessed (2009)
- Nature of the Beast (2007)
- The Nature of the Beast: (1919 & 1995)
- Nature Calls (2012)
- Nature Law (2014)
- Nature Unleashed: Earthquake (2005)
- Nature's Gentleman (1918)
- Nature’s Grave (2008)
- Nature's Half Acre (1951)
- Nature's Touch (1914)
- Nature's Warrior (1997)
- Natutulog Pa Ang Diyos (1988)
- Natyam (2021)
- Natyarani (1949)

==== Nau ====
- Nau Do Gyarah (1957)
- Naug Ma Kja Kyay (2004)
- Naughty 40 (2017)
- Naughty @ 40 (2011)
- Naughty Baby (1928)
- Naughty Boy (1962)
- Naughty Boys & Soldiers (1996)
- Naughty but Nice (1927)
- Naughty Cinderella (1933)
- Naughty Dallas (1964)
- The Naughty Duchess (1928)
- The Naughty Flirt (1931)
- Naughty Girl (1956)
- Naughty Grandma (2017)
- Naughty Jatts (2013)
- The Naughty List (2016)
- Naughty Marietta (1935)
- Naughty Martine (1947)
- Naughty but Mice (1939)
- Naughty Nanette (1927)
- Naughty, Naughty (1974)
- Naughty, Naughty! (1918)
- Naughty Neighbors (1939)
- Naughty but Nice (1939)
- Naughty or Nice (2014)
- The Naughty Nineties (1945)
- The Naughty Otter (1916)
- Naughty Professor (2012)
- Naujawan (1951)
- Naukar (1943)
- Naukar Biwi Ka (1983)
- Naukar Ki Kameez (1999)
- Naukar Wohti Da (1974)
- Nauker (1979)
- Naulakha Haar (1953)
- Nausicaä of the Valley of the Wind (1984)
- Nautanki Saala! (2013)

==== Nav ====
- Nava Vasantham (2007)
- Navagatharkku Swagatham (2012)
- Navagraha (2008)
- Navagraha Nayagi (1985)
- Navagraham (1970)
- Navajeevana (1964)
- Navajeevanam (1949)
- Navajeros (1980)
- Navajo (1952)
- Navajo Blues (1996)
- Navajo Joe (1966)
- Navajo Kid (1945)
- Navajo Run (1964)
- Navajo Trail Raiders (1949)
- The Navajo's Bride (1910)
- The Naval Commandos (1977)
- Navalny (2022)
- Navarasa (2005)
- The Navigator (1924)
- The Navigator: A Medieval Odyssey (1988)
- The Navigators (2001)
- The Navy (1930)
- The Navy Aviator (1914)
- Navy Blue Days (1925)
- Navy Blue and Gold (1937)
- Navy Blues: (1929, 1937 & 1941)
- The Navy Comes Through (1942)
- The Navy Lark (1959)
- The Navy vs. the Night Monsters (1966)
- Navy Nurse (1945)
- Navy SEALs (1990)
- Navy Seals vs. Zombies (2015)
- Navy Secrets (1939)
- Navy Spy (1937)
- The Navy Way (1944)
- Navy Wife: (1935 & 1956)

==== Naw–Nay ====
- Nawab Naarkali (1972)
- Nawab Sirajuddaula (1967)
- Naxal (2015)
- The Naxalites (1980)
- Naya Andaz (1956)
- Naya Daur: (1957 & 1978)
- Naya Din Nai Raat (1974)
- Naya Kadam (1984)
- Naya Kanoon (1965)
- Naya Khoon (1990)
- Naya Legend of the Golden Dolphin (2022)
- Naya Legend of the Golden Dolphins (2010)
- Naya Nasha (1973)
- Naya Pata (2014)
- Naya Raasta (1970)
- Naya Safar (1982)
- Naya Sansar (1941)
- Naya Tarana (1943)
- Naya Zaher (1991)
- Naya Zamana (1971)
- Nayagan (2008)
- Nayak: (1966, 2001 Assamese & 2001 Hindi)
- Nayakan: (1985, 1987 & 2010)
- Nayakudu Vinayakudu (1980)
- Nayaki (2016)
- Nayam Vyakthamakkunnu (1991)
- Nayee Padosan (2003)
- Nayyapudai (2016)

==== Naz ====
- Naz & Maalik (2015)
- Nazar: (1991 & 2005)
- Nazar the Brave (1940)
- Nazar Ke Samne (1995)
- Nazareno Cruz and the Wolf (1975)
- Nazarín (1968)
- Nazhikakkallu (1970)
- Nazi Agent (1942)
- Nazi Hunter: The Beate Klarsfeld Story (1986 TV)
- Nazi Love Camp 27 (1977)
- The Nazi Plan (1945)
- Nazi Pop Twins (2007)
- Nazis at the Center of the Earth (2012)
- The Nazis Strike (1943)
- Nazis: The Occult Conspiracy (1998)
- Nazrana: (1942, 1961 & 1987)
- That Nazty Nuisance (1943)

=== Nd ===
- Ndeyssaan (2001)
- Ndoto Za Elibidi (2010)

=== Ne ===
- Ne čakaj na maj (1957)
- Ne daj se, Floki (1986)
- The Ne'er-Do-Well: (1916 & 1923)
- Ne jouez pas avec les Martiens (1967)
- Ne m'abandonne pas (2016 TV)
- Ne parliamo Lunedi (1990)
- Ne quittez pas ! (2004)
- Ne Zha (2019)
- Ne Zha 2 (2025)

==== Nea–Neb ====
- Neal of the Navy (1915)
- Neal 'n' Nikki (2005)
- The Neanderthal Man (1953)
- Neang Champameas (1970)
- Neapolitan Carousel (1954)
- Neapolitan Mouse (1954)
- Neapolitan Mystery (1979)
- A Neapolitan Spell (2002)
- Neapolitan Turk (1953)
- Neapolitans in Milan (1953)
- Near Dark (1987)
- Near Death Experience (2014)
- Near Dublin (1924)
- Near to Earth (1913)
- Near and Far Away (1976)
- The Near Future (2012)
- Near the Rainbow's End (1930)
- Near the Trail's End (1931)
- Nearer My God to Thee (1917)
- Nearest and Dearest (1972)
- Nearest to Heaven (2002)
- Nearing Grace (2005)
- The Nearly Complete and Utter History of Everything (1999 TV)
- A Nearly Decent Girl (1963)
- Nearly a Deserter (1916)
- Nearly Eighteen (1943)
- Nearly a King (1916)
- Nearly a Lady (1915)
- Nearly Married (1917)
- Nearly a Nasty Accident (1961)
- The Nearsighted School Teacher (1898)
- Neberte nám princeznú (1981)
- Nebeski odred (1961)
- Nebeští jezdci (1968)
- Nebo Zovyot (1959)
- Nebraska (2013)
- The Nebraskan (1953)

==== Nec–Ned ====
- Necessary Evil (2008)
- The Necessary Evil (1925)
- Necessary Evil: Super-Villains of DC Comics (2013)
- Necessary Love (1991)
- Necessary Roughness (1991)
- The Necessities of Life (2008)
- Neck (2010)
- Neck and Neck (1931)
- A Necklace for My Beloved (1971)
- The Necktie (2008)
- Necrofobia (2014)
- Necromancer: (1988 & 2005)
- Necromancy (1972)
- Necromentia (2009)
- Necronomicon (1993)
- Necropolis (1970)
- Necropolis Awakened (2002)
- Necropolis, They Will Be Ashes But Still Will Feel (2016)
- Necrosis (2009)
- Ned (2003)
- Ned Blessing: The True Story of My Life (1992 TV)
- Ned Kelly: (1970 & 2003)
- Ned McCobb's Daughter (1928)
- Ned Rifle (2014)
- Nederland en Oranje (1913)
- Neds (2010)
- Ned's Project (2016)
- Nedunalvaadai (2019)
- Nedunchaalai (2014)

==== Nee ====
- Nee! (1965)
- Nee Bareda Kadambari (1985)
- Nee Enthan Vaanam (2000)
- Nee Illadhe (2011)
- Nee Jathaga Nenundali (2014)
- Nee Ko Njaa Cha (2013)
- Nee Kosam (1999)
- Nee Manasu Naaku Telusu (2003)
- Nee-Na (2015)
- Nee Naan Nila (2007)
- Nee Nanna Gellalare (1981)
- Nee Pathi Naan Pathi (1991)
- Nee Premakai (2002)
- Nee Sneham (2002)
- Nee Sukhame Ne Koruthunna (2008)
- Nee Tata Naa Birla (2008)
- Nee Thanda Kanike (1985)
- Nee Thodu Kavali (2002)
- Nee Unnai Arindhaal (2009)
- Nee Varuvai Ena (1999)
- Nee Varuvolam (1997)
- Nee Venunda Chellam (2006)
- Neecha Nagar (1946)
- Need for Speed (2014)
- Needful Things (1993)
- Needhi (1972)
- Needhi Pizhaithathu (1981)
- Needhi Singh (2016)
- Needhikku Thalaivanangu (1976)
- Needhikkuppin Paasam (1963)
- Needhipathi (1955)
- Needhiyin Nizhal (1985)
- Needi Naadi Oke Katha (2018)
- Needing You... (2000)
- Needle (2010)
- The Needle (1988)
- Needle in the Haystack (1953)
- Needle in a Timestack (2021)
- Neeku Naaku Dash Dash (2012)
- Neeku Nenu Naaku Nuvvu (2003)
- Neel Akasher Chandni (2009)
- Neel Akasher Neechey (1958)
- Neel Kamal: (1947 & 1968)
- Neel Rajar Deshe (2008)
- Neela (2001)
- Neela Aakash (1965)
- Neela Kurinji Poothappol (1987)
- Neela Kuyil (1995)
- Neela Malargal (1979)
- Neela Parbat (1969)
- Neela Ponman (1975)
- Neela Sari (1976)
- Neela Vaanam (1965)
- Neelagiri (1991)
- Neelagiri Express (1968)
- Neelakannukal (1974)
- Neelakanta (2006)
- Neelakasham Pachakadal Chuvanna Bhoomi (2013)
- Neelakuyil (1954)
- Neelam (2013)
- Neelamalai Thirudan (1957)
- Neelathamara: (1979 & 2009)
- Neelavukku Neranja Manasu (1958)
- Neeli (2018)
- Neelkanth (2012)
- Neelmani (1957)
- Neem Annapurna (1979)
- Neenade Naa (2014)
- Neend Hamari Khwab Tumhare: (1966 & 1971)
- Neenello Naanalle (2006)
- Neenga Nalla Irukkanum (1992)
- Neengadha Ninaivu (1963)
- Neengal Kettavai (1984)
- Neenu Nakkare Haalu Sakkare (1991)
- Neer Dose (2016)
- Neeraba Jhada (1984)
- Neerali (2018)
- Neerja (2016)
- Neerkumizhi (1965)
- Neermaathalathinte pookkal (2006 TV)
- Neerparavai (2012)
- Neerum Neruppum (1971)
- Neethaane En Ponvasantham (2012)
- Neethi (1971)
- Neethi Devan Mayakkam (1982)
- Neethibathi (1983)
- Neethikku Thandanai (1987)
- Neethipeedam (1977)
- Neethiyin Marupakkam (1985)
- Neetho (2002)
- Neeti-Nijayiti (1972)
- Neevevaro (2018)
- Neeya? (1979)
- Neeya 2 (2019)
- Neeyallengil Njan (1987)
- Neeyat (1980)
- Neeye Nijam (2005)
- Neeyethra Dhanya (1987)
- Neeyo Njaano (1979)
- Neeyum Naanum (2010)
- Neeyum Njanum (2019)

==== Nef–Nek ====
- Nefarious (2023)
- Nefarious: Merchant of Souls (2011)
- Nefertiti, figlia del sole (1994)
- Nefertiti, Queen of the Nile (1961)
- Negadon: The Monster from Mars (2005)
- Negar (2017)
- Negative Space (2017)
- Negatives: (1968 & 1988)
- Neglected (2026)
- The Neglected Wife (1917)
- The Negotiation (2018)
- The Negotiator (1998)
- The Negro (2002)
- Negro Colleges in War Time (1943)
- Negro es mi color (1951)
- The Negro Sailor (1945)
- The Negro Soldier (1944)
- Negroes with Guns: Rob Williams and Black Power (2004)
- Nehle Pe Dehla (1976)
- Nehlle Pe Dehlla (2007)
- Neige (1981)
- Neighbor (2009)
- The Neighbor: (1993, 2012 & 2018)
- The Neighbor No. Thirteen (2005)
- The Neighbor's Wife and Mine (1931)
- Neighborhood House (1936)
- Neighborhood Watch (2025)
- The Neighborhood Watch (2014)
- Neighboring Sounds (2012)
- Neighbors: (1920, 1981 & 2014)
- Neighbors 2: Sorority Rising (2016)
- Neighbours: (1952 & 1966)
- Neighbours: They Are Vampires (2014)
- Neil Gaiman: Dream Dangerously (2013)
- Neil Simon's I Ought to Be in Pictures (1982)
- Neil Young: Heart of Gold (2006)
- Neil Young Journeys (2011)
- Neil Young Trunk Show (2009)
- Neil's Party (2005)
- Neither Are We Enemies (1970 TV)
- Neither Blood nor Sand (1941)
- Neither by Day nor by Night (1972)
- Neither at Home or Abroad (1919)
- Neither Rich nor Poor (1953)
- Neither Seen Nor Recognized (1958)
- Nejlepší člověk (1954)
- Nejlepší ženská mého života (1968)
- Největší z Čechů (2010)
- Nekabborer Mohaproyan (2014)
- Nekro (1997)
- Nekromancer (2018)
- NEKRomantik series:
  - NEKRomantik (1987)
  - NEKRomantik 2 (1991)

==== Nel–Nem ====
- Nel blu dipinto di blu (1959)
- Nel sole (1967)
- Nela (2018)
- Nelavanka (1983)
- Nell (1994)
- Nell Gwyn (1926)
- Nell Gwynn (1934)
- Nella città l'inferno (1959)
- Nellie, the Beautiful Cloak Model (1924)
- Nelligan (1991)
- Nell's Eugenic Wedding (1914)
- Nellu: (1974 & 2010)
- Nelly: (2004 & 2016)
- Nelly, the Bride Without a Husband (1924)
- Nelly and Mr. Arnaud (1995)
- Nelly's Folly (1961)
- Nelly's Version (1983)
- Nelson: (1918 & 1926)
- The Nelson Affair (1973)
- Nema aviona za Zagreb (2012)
- Nema problema: (1984 & 2004)
- Nemesis: (1920, 1992 & 2010)
  - Nemesis 2: Nebula (1995)
  - Nemesis 3: Prey Harder (1996)
  - Nemesis 4: Death Angel (1996)
- Nemesis Game (2003)
- Nemir (1982)
- Nemo's Bank (1934)
- Nemoda Boolya (2017)
- Nemtsov (2016)
- Nemuranai Machi: Shinjuku Same (1993)
- Nemuri Kyōshirō manji giri (1969)
- Nemuri no Mori (2014 TV)
- Nemuritorii (1974)

==== Nen–Nep ====
- Nena (2014)
- Nenante Nene (1968)
- Nenapina Doni (1986)
- Nenapirali (2005)
- Nenè (1977)
- Nene Monaganni (1968)
- Nene Raju Nene Mantri (2017)
- Nenem...Chinna Pillana? (2013)
- Neneh Superstar (2022)
- Neninthe (2008)
- Nenjai Thodu (2007)
- Nenjam Marappathillai: (1963 & 2021)
- Nenjamundu Nermaiyundu Odu Raja (2019)
- Nenjangal (1982)
- Nenjathai Allitha (1984)
- Nenjathai Killadhe (2008)
- Nenjathai Killathe (1980)
- Nenjil Jil Jil (2006)
- Nenjil Or Aalayam (1962)
- Nenjil Thunivirundhal (2017)
- Nenjile Thunivirunthal (1981)
- Nenjinile (1999)
- Nenjirukkum Varai: (1967 & 2006)
- Nentaro Gantu Kallaro (1979)
- Nenu Local (2017)
- Nenu Meeku Telusa? (2009)
- Nenu Naa Rakshasi (2011)
- Nenu Premisthunnanu (1998)
- Nenu Sailaja (2016)
- Nenunnanu (2004)
- Neo Ned (2005)
- Neo Rauch – Gefährten und Begleiter (2016)
- Neo Tokyo (1987)
- The Neon Bible (1995)
- Neon Bull (2015)
- The Neon Ceiling (1971 TV)
- Neon City (1991)
- The Neon Demon (2016)
- The Neon Empire (1989 TV)
- Neon Maniacs (1986)
- Nepal Forever (2013)
- Nepali (2008)
- The Nephew (1998)
- The Nephews of Zorro (1968)
- Neptune Bewitched (1925)
- The Neptune Factor (1973)
- Neptune Frost (2021)
- Neptune Mission (1958)
- Neptune's Daughter: (1914 & 1949)

==== Ner ====
- Neram Nadi Kadu Akalidi (1976)
- Neram Pularumbol (1986)
- Neram Vandhachu (1982)
- Neramu Siksha (1973)
- Neranja Manasu (2004)
- Nerariyan CBI (2005)
- Nerariyum Nerathu (1985)
- Nerd Prom: Inside Washington's Wildest Week (2015)
- Nerd Wars! (2011)
- Nerdcore for Life (2008)
- Nerdcore Rising (2008)
- Nerdland (2016)
- Neria (1993)
- Nerkonda Paarvai (2019)
- Nero: (1909, 1922 & 2004)
- Nero and the Burning of Rome (1953)
- Nero Wolfe (1977 TV)
- Nerone: (1930 & 1977)
- Nerrukku Ner (1997)
- Nertsery Rhymes (1933)
- Neruda (2016)
- Nerungi Vaa Muthamidathe (2014)
- Neruppu Da (2017)
- Nerupukkul Eeram (1984)
- Nerve: (2013 & 2016)
- Nerves (1919)
- Nervous Night (1986)
- Nervy Nat Kisses the Bride (1904)

==== Nes–Neu ====
- Nesam Pudhusu (1999)
- Neshoba (2010)
- Nesimi (1973)
- Nessie & Me (2017)
- Nessun Dorma (2016)
- Nessuno è perfetto (1981)
- Nessuno ha tradito (1952)
- Nessuno mi può giudicare (1966)
- The Nest: (1927, 1980, 1988, 2002, 2018 & 2020)
- The Nest of the Turtledove (2016)
- A Nest Unfeathered (1914)
- Nest of Wasps (1927)
- The Nesting (1981)
- Nešto između (1983)
- The Net: (1923, 1953, 1975, 1995 & 2016)
- The Net 2.0 (2006)
- Net Worth: (1995 & 2000)
- Netaji (2019)
- Netaji Palkar (1927)
- NetForce (1999)
- Netherbeast Incorporated (2007)
- Netherland Dwarf (2008)
- Netherworld (1991)
- Nethraa (2019)
- Neti Bharatam (1983)
- Neti Siddhartha (1990)
- Netrikkan (1981)
- Netru Indru Naalai: (1974 & 2008)
- Nets of Destiny (1924)
- Nettippattam (1991)
- Netto (2005)
- Network: (1976 & 2019)
- Netz über Bord – Heringsfang auf der Nordsee (1955)
- Netzwerk (1970)
- Neuilly sa mère, sa mère! (2018)
- Neuilly Yo Mama! (2009)
- Neurons to Nirvana (2013)
- Neurosia: 50 Years of Perversity (1995)
- Neurotypical (2013)
- Neutral Port (1940)
- Neutrality (1949)

==== Nev ====
- Nevada: (1927, 1935, 1944 & 1997)
- Nevada Badmen (1951)
- The Nevada Buckaroo (1931)
- Nevada City (1941)
- Nevada Smith: (1966 & 1975 TV)
- The Nevadan (1950)
- Never (2014)
- Never Again: (1916 & 2001)
- Never Back Down series:
  - Never Back Down (2008)
  - Never Back Down 2: The Beatdown (2011)
  - Never Back Down: No Surrender (2016)
- Never Back Losers (1961)
- Never a Backward Step (1966)
- Never Been Kissed (1999)
- Never Been Thawed (2005)
- Never Cry Werewolf (2008)
- Never Cry Wolf (1983)
- Never Die Alone (2004)
- Never Die Young (2013)
- Never a Dull Moment: (1943, 1950 & 1968)
- Never Ending Story (2012)
- Never Ever: (1996 & 2016)
- Never Fear (1950)
- Never on the First Night (2014)
- Never Forever (2007)
- Never Forget (1991 TV)
- Never Forget Me (1976)
- Never Give a Sucker an Even Break (1941)
- Never Give Up (1978)
- Never Give Up: The 20th Century Odyssey of Herbert Zipper (1995)
- Never Goin' Back (2018)
- Never Gone (2016)
- Never Gonna Snow Again (2020)
- Never Grow Old (2019)
- Never Have I Ever (2009)
- Never Here (2017)
- Never Leave Me (2017)
- Never Let Go (1960 & 2024)
- Never Let Me Go: (1953 & 2010)
- Never Look Away (2018)
- Never Look Back (1952)
- Never Love a Stranger (1958)
- Never Met Picasso (1996)
- Never Mind the Quality Feel the Width (1973)
- Never My Soul! (2001)
- Never Never Land (1980)
- Never Not Love You (2018)
- Never Put It in Writing (1964)
- Never Quite the Same (2008)
- Never Rarely Sometimes Always (2020)
- Never Said Goodbye (2016)
- Never Say Die: (1939, 1988 & 2017)
- Never Say Goodbye: (1946 & 1956)
- Never Say Never Again (1983)
- Never Say Never Mind: The Swedish Bikini Team (2001)
- Never Say Quit (1919)
- Never Sleep Again: The Elm Street Legacy (2010)
- Never So Few (1959)
- Never Steady, Never Still (2017)
- Never Steal Anything Small (1959)
- Never Stop (2021)
- Never on Sunday (1960)
- Never Surrender (2009)
- Never Take No for an Answer (1951)
- Never Take Sweets from a Stranger (1960)
- Never Talk to Strangers (1995)
- Never Too Late: (1935, 1965 & 1996)
- Never Too Old (1914)
- Never Touched Me (1919)
- Never Trouble Trouble (1931)
- Never Trust a Gambler (1951)
- Never Trust a Woman (1930)
- Never on Tuesday (1989)
- Never the Twain (1926)
- Never the Twain Shall Meet: (1925 & 1931)
- Never Wave at a WAC (1953)
- Never Weaken (1921)
- The Neverending Story series:
  - The Neverending Story (1984)
  - The NeverEnding Story II: The Next Chapter (1990)
  - The NeverEnding Story III (1994)
- Neverlake (2013)
- Neverland (2003)
- Nevermore: (2006 & 2007)
- Neverwas (2005)
- Nevidni bataljon (1967)
- Nevíte o bytě? (1947)

==== New ====
- New (2004)
- The New Adventures of Aladdin (2015)
- The New Adventures of Cinderella (2017)
- The New Adventures of the Elusive Avengers (1968)
- New Adventures of Get Rich Quick Wallingford (1931)
- The New Adventures of Heidi (1978 TV)
- The New Adventures of J. Rufus Wallingford (1915)
- The New Adventures of Little Toot (1992)
- The New Adventures of Pinocchio (1999)
- The New Adventures of Pippi Longstocking (1988)
- The New Adventures of Snow White (1969)
- The New Adventures of Spin and Marty: Suspect Behavior (2000 TV)
- New Adventures of a Yankee in King Arthur's Court (1988)
- The New Age (1994)
- The New Babylon (1929)
- The New Barbarians (1983)
- The New Bell (1950)
- New Best Friend (2002)
- The New Bremen Town Musicians (2000)
- The New Centurions (1972)
- The New China (1950)
- The New Clown (1916)
- The New Commandment (1925)
- The New Corporation: The Unfortunately Necessary Sequel (2020)
- The New Country (2000)
- A New Cure for Divorce (1912)
- The New Daughter (2009)
- A New Day in Old Sana'a (2005)
- The New Deal Show (1937)
- New Dragon Gate Inn (1992)
- The New Dress (1911)
- New Frontier (1939)
- The New Frontier (1935)
- The New Gentlemen (1929)
- The New Girlfriend (2014)
- The New Gladiators (2002)
- The New Godfathers (1979)
- New Gods: Nezha Reborn (2021)
- The New Gulliver (1935)
- The New Guy (2002)
- New Happy Dad and Son 2: The Instant Genius (2016)
- The New Hotel (1932)
- The New Interns (1964)
- New Jack City (1991)
- The New Janitor (1914)
- New Jersey Drive (1995)
- The New Kids (1985)
- A New Kind of Love (1963)
- The New King of Comedy (2019)
- The New Klondike (1926)
- The New Land: (1924 & 1972)
- A New Leaf (1971)
- The New Legend of Shaolin (1994)
- A New Life (1988)
- The New Life of Paul Sneijder (2016)
- The New Lot (1943)
- A New Love Ishtory (2013)
- The New Man (2007)
- The New Maverick (1978 TV)
- New Moon: (1930 & 1940)
- The New Moon (1919)
- The New Moscow (1938)
- The New Mutants (2020)
- The New One-Armed Swordsman (1971)
- The New Paradise (1921)
- New Pillow Fight (1897)
- New Police Story (2004)
- The New Pupil (1940)
- The New Radical (2017)
- The New Relative (1934)
- The New Romantic (2018)
- New Rose Hotel (1998)
- The New Spirit (1942)
- The New Superintendent (1911)
- The New Swiss Family Robinson (1998 TV)
- The New Teacher (1939)
- The New Ten Commandments (2008)
- The New Tenants (2009)
- New in Town (2009)
- New Waterford Girl (1999)
- A New Wave (2006)
- New Women (1935)
- The New World: (1957, 2005 & 2011)
- New World Order (2009)
- New World Order: The End Has Come (2013)
- New Year: (1924 & 1989)
- The New Year (2010)
- New Year Blues (2021)
- The New Year Parade (2008)
- New Year's Day: (1989 & 2001)
- New Year's Eve: (1924, 1929, 2002 & 2011)
- The New Year's Eve of Old Lee (2016)
- New Year's Evil (1980)
- New York Doll (2005)
- The New York Hat (1912)
- The New York Idea (1920)
- New York Minute (2004)
- New York New York (2016)
- New York Ninja (2021)
- The New York Peacock (1917)
- The New York Ripper (1982)
- New York Stories (1989)
- New York, I Love You (2009)
- New York, New York (1977)
- Newark Athlete (1891)
- Newborn (2026)
- The Newburgh Sting (2014)
- The Newcomers (2020)
- The Newer Way (1915)
- The Newest Pledge (2012)
- The Newest Star of Variety (1917)
- The Newman Shame (1977 TV)
- Newness (2017)
- The News (1989)
- News Is Made at Night (1939)
- The News Parade of the Year 1942 (1942)
- News of the World (2020)
- A Newsboy Hero (1911)
- Newsfront (1978)
- The Newsie and the Lady (1938)
- Newsies (1992)
- A Newspaper Nemesis (1915)
- The Newspaperman (2017)
- Newton (2017)
- The Newton Boys (1998)

==== Nex–Nez ====
- Next: (1990 & 2007)
- The Next 365 Days (2022)
- Next: A Primer on Urban Painting (2005)
- Next Aisle Over (1919)
- The Next Best Thing (2000)
- The Next Big Thing (2001)
- The Next Corner (1924)
- Next Day Air (2009)
- Next Door: (1975 & 1994)
- Next Enti? (2018)
- Next Floor (2008)
- Next Friday (2000)
- Next Gen (2018)
- Next Goal Wins: (2014 & 2023)
- Next to Her (2014)
- The Next Karate Kid (1994)
- The Next of Kin (1942)
- Next of Kin: (1982, 1984 & 1989)
- The Next Man (1976)
- Next to Me (2015)
- Next to No Time (1958)
- Next Nuvve (2017)
- The Next One (1984)
- Next, Please! (1930)
- The Next Race: The Remote Viewings (2007)
- Next Stop, Greenwich Village (1976)
- Next Stop Paradise: (1980 & 1998)
- Next Stop Wonderland (1998)
- Next Summer (1985)
- The Next Three Days (2010)
- Next Time the Fire (1993)
- Next Time I Marry (1938)
- Next Time I'll Aim for the Heart (2014)
- Next Time Ned (2008)
- Next Time We Love (1936)
- The Next Voice You Hear... (1950)
- Next Year in Argentina (2005)
- Nextdoor to the Velinskys (2011)
- Neydhen Vakivaakah (2017)
- Neyngi Yaaru Vakivee (2016)
- Neythukaran (2002)
- Nezha (2014)
- Nezlobte dědečka (1934)
- Nezulla the Rat Monster (2002)

=== Ng–Nh ===
- Nga mesi i errësirës (1978)
- Ngayong Nandito Ka (2003)
- Ngwe Pay Lo Ma Ya (1932)
- Nhamo (2011)

=== Ni ===
- Ni Jing: Thou Shalt Not Steal (2013)
- Ni na nebu ni na zemlji (1994)
- Ni Noma (2016)

==== Nia–Nie ====
- Niagara (1953)
- Niagara Falls: (1932 & 1941)
- Niagara Fools (1956)
- Niagara: Miracles, Myths and Magic (1986)
- Niagara Motel (2005)
- Niagara, Niagara (1997)
- Nibbles (2003)
- Nice Bombs (2006)
- Nice Dreams (1981)
- Nice Girl? (1941)
- A Nice Girl Like Me (1969)
- A Nice Girl Like You (2020)
- Nice Girls Don't Explode (1987)
- Nice Guy Johnny (2010)
- The Nice Guys (2016)
- Nice Guys Sleep Alone (1999)
- A Nice Indian Boy (2024)
- A Nice Little Bank That Should Be Robbed (1958)
- A Nice Neighbor (1979)
- Nice Package (2013)
- Nice People (1922)
- Nice Time (1957)
- Nice View (2022)
- Nice Witch (2018)
- Nice Women (1931)
- Nichaya Thaamboolam (1962)
- Nichiren to Mōko Daishūrai (1958)
- Nichiyobi wa Owaranai (2000)
- Nicholas and Alexandra (1971)
- Nicholas' Gift (1998)
- Nicholas Nickleby: (1912 & 2002)
- Nick Carter, Master Detective (1939)
- Nick Fury: Agent of S.H.I.E.L.D. (1998 TV)
- Nick, King of the Chauffeurs (1925)
- Nick Nolte: No Exit (2008)
- Nick & Norah's Infinite Playlist (2008)
- Nick Offerman: American Ham (2014)
- Nick of Time (1995)
- The Nickel-Hopper (1926)
- Nickel Mountain (1984)
- Nickel Queen (1971)
- The Nickel Ride (1974)
- Nickelodeon (1976)
- Nicky's Game (2005)
- Nico the Unicorn (1998)
- Nicole (1978)
- Nidhiyude Katha (1986)
- Nidi Yahana Kelabei (2011)
- Nidra: (1981 & 2012)
- Nie Er (1959)
- Niel Lynne (1985)
- Niespotykanie spokojny człowiek (1975 TV)

==== Nif–Nih ====
- The Nifty Nineties (1941)
- Nigakute Amai (2016)
- A Nigger in the Woodpile (1904)
- Night: (1930 & 2008)
- The Night: (1992 & 2020)
- The Night of the 12th (2022)
- Night Accident: (1980 & 2017)
- Night Across the Street (2012)
- Night of Adventure (2014)
- A Night of Adventure (1944)
- Night After Night (1932)
- Night Alarm (1934)
- Night Alone (1938)
- The Night Angel (1931)
- Night Angels (1987)
- Night Arrival (1949)
- Night Beat: (1931 & 1947)
- The Night Before: (1988 & 2015)
- The Night Before Christmas: (1905, 1913, 1933, 1941, 1951 & 1961)
- The Night Before the Divorce (1942)
- The Night Before the Premiere (1959)
- The Night Belongs to Us (1929)
- Night of the Big Heat (1967)
- The Night Bird (1928)
- Night Birds (1930)
- Night of the Blood Beast (1958)
- Night of the Bloody Apes (1972)
- Night of Bloody Horror (1969)
- Night Boat to Dublin (1946)
- Night Boats (2012)
- The Night Brings Charlie (1990)
- Night of the Burglar (1921)
- Night Bus: (2007 & 2017)
- The Night Bus (2007)
- Night Call (2024)
- Night Call Nurses (1972)
- The Night Caller (1998)
- Night Caller from Outer Space (1965)
- A Night in Casablanca (1946)
- Night Catches Us (2010)
- Night and the City: (1950 & 1992)
- Night in the City (1933)
- The Night Clerk (2020)
- Night Club: (1952 & 2011)
- The Night Club (1925)
- Night Club Girl (1945)
- The Night Club Lady (1932)
- The Night Club Queen (1934)
- Night Club Scandal (1937)
- The Night Coachman (1928)
- Night of the Cobra Woman (1972)
- Night Comes On (2018)
- Night Comes Too Soon (1948)
- The Night Comes for Us (2018)
- Night of the Comet (1984)
- Night Convoy (1932)
- Night Court (1932)
- Night Creatures (1962)
- Night of the Creeps (1986)
- The Night Crew (2015)
- Night Crossing (1982)
- Night at the Crossroads (1932)
- The Night Cry (1926)
- Night of Dark Shadows (1971)
- Night and Day: (1946, 1991 & 2008)
- Night of the Day of the Dawn (1991)
- Night of the Dead (2006)
- Night in December (1940)
- Night of Decision (1956)
- Night of the Demon: (1957 & 1980)
- Night of the Demons series:
  - Night of the Demons: (1988 & 2009)
  - Night of the Demons 2 (1994)
  - Night of the Demons 3 (1997)
- The Night Digger (1971)
- Night Drum (1958)
- Night Duty (1974)
- Night of the Eagle (1962)
- Night on Earth (1991)
- The Night Eats the World (2018)
- Night Editor (1946)
- The Night Evelyn Came Out of the Grave (1971)
- Night Eyes series:
  - Night Eyes (1990)
  - Night Eyes 2 (1992)
  - Night Eyes 3 (1993)
  - Night Eyes 4: Fatal Passion (1996)
- Night Fairy (1986)
- The Night Falls (1952)
- Night Falls on Manhattan (1996)
- Night Fare (2015)
- Night of Fear (1972)
- Night Fire (1994)
- Night Fishing (2011)
- The Night Flier (1997)
- Night Flight: (1933 & 2014)
- Night Flight from Moscow (1973)
- Night of the Flood (1996)
- The Night Flyer (1928)
- Night and Fog: (1956 & 2009)
- Night and Fog in Japan (1960)
- Night and Fog in Zona (2015)
- The Night of the Following Day (1969)
- Night of the Fox (1990)
- Night Freight (1955)
- Night Friend (1987)
- Night Fright (1967)
- A Night Full of Rain (1978)
- Night on the Galactic Railroad (1985)
- Night Gallery (1969) (TV)
- Night Game (1989)
- Night Games: (1966 & 1980)
- A Night at the Garden (2017)
- Night of the Garter (1933)
- The Night of the Generals (1967)
- Night of the Ghouls (1957)
- The Night God Screamed (1971)
- Night at the Golden Eagle (2001)
- The Night of the Grizzly (1966)
- The Night Has Eyes (1942)
- Night Has Settled (2014)
- Night Has a Thousand Eyes (1948)
- The Night Hawk: (1924 & 1938)
- A Night in Heaven (1983)
- Night of the Hell Hamsters (2006)
- Night of Henna (2005)
- The Night House (2020)
- Night Hunter: (1996 & 2018)
- The Night of the Hunter (1955)
- The Night of the Iguana (1964)
- Night Inn (1947)
- Night Is Day (2012)
- The Night Is Short, Walk On Girl (2017)
- Night in Jinling (1985)
- Night Journey (1987)
- Night of the Juggler (1980)
- Night Kaleidoscope (2017)
- Night Key (1937)
- Night Killer (1990)
- Night of the Kings (2020)
- A Night of Knowing Nothing (2021)
- Night of the Lepus (1972)
- Night Life (1989)
- Night Life of the Gods (1935)
- Night Life Hero (1992)
- Night Life in Hollywood (1922)
- Night Life of New York (1925)
- Night Life in Reno (1931)
- A Night Like This (1932)
- The Night Listener (2006)
- Night of the Living Bread (1990)
- Night of the Living Dead: (1968 & 1990)
- Night of the Living Dead 3D (2006)
- Night of the Living Dead 3D: Re-Animation (2012)
- Night of the Living Dead: Darkest Dawn (2015)
- Night of the Living Dead: Resurrection (2012)
- Night of the Living Deb (2015)
- Night of the Living Dorks (2004)
- Night Lodgers (2007)
- Night in London (1967)
- Night Magic (1985)
- Night Mail: (1935, 1936 & 2014)
- Night in Manhattan (1937)
- Night Market Hero (2011)
- Night in May (1934)
- Night Mayor (2009)
- Night of Miracles (1954)
- Night Monster (1942)
- Night into Morning (1951)
- Night Moves: (1975 & 2013)
- Night at the Museum series:
  - Night at the Museum (2006)
  - Night at the Museum: Battle of the Smithsonian (2009)
  - Night at the Museum: Secret of the Tomb (2014)
  - Night at the Museum: Kahmunrah Rises Again (2022)
- Night Must Fall: (1937 & 1964)
- Night of Mystery: (1927 & 1937)
- Night of the Naked Dead (2013)
- Night in New Orleans (1942)
- Night and No Morning (1921)
- Night Nurse: (1931, 1979 & 2026)
- Night Nurse Ingeborg (1958)
- A Night at the Opera (1935)
- Night of the Orangutan (1992)
- Night Out (1989)
- A Night Out: (1915 & 1961)
- Night Over Chile (1977)
- Night Owl (1993)
- Night Owls: (1930 & 2015)
- Night Parade (1929)
- Night in Paradise: (1946 & 2020)
- A Night in Paradise: (1919 & 1932)
- Night Partners (1983)
- Night Passage (1957)
- Night Pastor (1998)
- Night Patrol (1984)
- Night Peacock (2016)
- Night of the Pencils (1986)
- Night People: (1954 & 2015)
- Night Plane from Chungking (1943)
- The Night Porter: (1930 & 1974)
- Night of the Prowler (1962)
- Night of the Quarter Moon (1959)
- Night Raiders: (1952 & 2021)
- Night Rehearsal (1983)
- A Night to Remember: (1942 & 1958)
- Night Ride: (1930 & 1937)
- Night Ride Home (1999)
- Night Riders (1981)
- The Night Riders: (1916, 1920 & 1939)
- Night Riders of Montana (1951)
- Night Round (1949)
- A Night at the Roxbury (1998)
- Night of the Running Man (1995)
- Night of the Scarecrow (1995)
- Night School: (1956, 1981 & 2018)
- Night Screams (1987)
- Night of the Seagulls (1975)
- Night by the Seashore (1981)
- Night of the Sharks (1988)
- Night Shift: (1982 & 2018)
- Night Shifts (2020)
- The Night of the Shooting Stars (1982)
- A Night in the Show (1915)
- Night Sights (2011)
- Night Skies (2006)
- Night Slaves (1970)
- Night Song: (1948 & 2016)
- Night Spot (1938)
- Night Stage to Galveston (1952)
- The Night Stalker: (1972, 1987 & 2016)
- The Night Strangler (1973)
- Night of the Strangler (1972)
- Night Stream (2013)
- Night Swim (2024)
- Night Tales (2016)
- The Night of Taneyamagahara (2006)
- Night Taxi (1950)
- Night Teeth (2021)
- Night of Temptation (1932)
- Night of Terror (1933)
- A Night of Terror (1911)
- Night Terrors (1993)
- The Night That Panicked America (1975) (TV)
- The Night They Came Home (2024)
- The Night They Killed Rasputin (1960)
- The Night They Raided Minsky's (1968)
- The Night They Saved Christmas (1984) (TV)
- The Night They Took Miss Beautiful (1977) (TV)
- Night Tide (1961)
- Night Time in Nevada (1948)
- Night Train: (1959, 1998, 1999, 2007 & 2009)
- Night Train for Inverness (1960)
- Night Train to Lisbon (2013)
- Night Train to Memphis (1946)
- Night Train to Milan (1962)
- Night Train to Munich (1940)
- Night Train to Murder (1985)
- Night Train to Paris (1964)
- Night Train to Terror (1985)
- Night Train to Venice (1993)
- Night Trap (1993)
- Night of Truth (2004)
- Night of the Twelve (1949)
- Night of the Twisters (1996)
- Night Unto Night (1949)
- Night of Violence (1965)
- Night Visions (1990)
- Night Visitor (1989)
- The Night Visitor (1971)
- Night Waitress (1936)
- Night Walk (2019)
- The Night Walker (1964)
- Night Warning (1946)
- Night Was Our Friend (1951)
- The Night Watch: (1925, 1926 & 2011)
- Night Watch: (1928, 1973 & 2004)
- The Night Watchman: (1938 & 2008)
- The Night We Called It a Day (2003)
- Night of the Werewolf (1980)
- The Night of the White Pants (2006)
- Night of the Wild (2015)
- Night Will Fall (2014)
- Night Without Pity (1961)
- Night Without Sleep (1952)
- Night Without Stars (1951)
- Night Work: (1930 & 1939)
- Night World (1932)
- The Night the World Exploded (1957)
- Night of the Zombies (1981)
- Night Zoo (1987)
- Nightbeast (1982)
- Nightbitch (2024)
- Nightbooks (2021)
- Nightbreaker (1989)
- Nightbreed (1990)
- Nightclub Hostess (1940)
- Nightclub School Hospital (2012)
- The Nightcomers (1971)
- Nightcrawler (2014)
- Nightfall: (1956, 1988, 2000 & 2012)
- Nightflyers (1987)
- Nighthawks: (1978, 1981 & 2019)
- The Nightingale: (1914, 1936, 1979, 2013, 2018)
- The Nightingale's Prayer (1959)
- Nightjohn (1996)
- Nightkill (1980)
- Nightlight: (2003 & 2015)
- Nightmare: (1942, 1956, 1964, 1981, 2000 & 2011)
- Nightmare on the 13th Floor (1990)
- Nightmare Alley: (1947 & 2021)
- Nightmare in Badham County (1976)
- Nightmare Beach (1988)
- The Nightmare Before Christmas (1993)
- Nightmare at Bittercreek (1988) (TV)
- Nightmare in Blood (1978)
- Nightmare Castle (1965)
- Nightmare Cinema (2018)
- Nightmare City (1983)
- Nightmare in Chicago (1964) (TV)
- Nightmare in the Daylight (1992)
- Nightmare Detective (2006)
- Nightmare Detective 2 (2008)
- A Nightmare on Elm Street series:
  - A Nightmare on Elm Street (1984)
  - A Nightmare on Elm Street 2: Freddy's Revenge (1985)
  - A Nightmare on Elm Street 3: Dream Warriors (1987)
  - A Nightmare on Elm Street 4: The Dream Master (1988)
  - A Nightmare on Elm Street 5: The Dream Child (1989)
  - A Nightmare on Elm Street (2010)
- Nightmare Factory (2011)
- Nightmare Honeymoon (1974)
- Nightmare Man (2006)
- Nightmare at Noon (1987)
- Nightmare Nurse (2016)
- Nightmare Sisters (1988)
- Nightmare in the Sun (1965)
- Nightmare in Wax (1969)
- Nightmare Weekend (1986)
- Nightmares: (1980 & 1983)
- Nightmares in the Makeup Chair (2018)
- Nightmares in Red, White and Blue (2009)
- Nightmaster (1988)
- A Night's Adventure (1923)
- Nights in Andalusia (1938)
- Nights of Cabiria (1957)
- Nights and Days (1975)
- Nights of Farewell (1965)
- Nights of Fire (1937)
- Nights on the Nile (1949)
- Nights in Port Said (1932)
- Nights on the Road (1952)
- Nights in Rodanthe (2008)
- Nights of Terror (1921)
- Nights and Weekends (2008)
- Nightshapes (1999)
- Nightside (1980)
- Nightstalker (2002)
- Nightstick (1987)
- Nightveil: Witch War (2005)
- Nightwalking (2008)
- Nightwatch: (1994 & 1997)
- Nightwatching (2007)
- Nightwatchman (2000)
- Nightwing (1979)
- Nightwish (1989)
- Nightworld (2017)
- The Nihilist (1905)
- Nihon no Fixer (1979)

==== Nij–Nim ====
- Nijangal Nilaikkindrana (1980)
- Nijinsky (1980)
- Nikaah (1982)
- Nikah (1998)
- Nikah Halala (1971)
- Nikdo nic neví (1947)
- Niki and Flo (2003)
- Nikini Vassa (2013)
- Nikita (1990)
- Nikka Zaildar series:
  - Nikka Zaildar (2016)
  - Nikka Zaildar 2 (2017)
- Nikki and the Perfect Stranger (2013)
- Nikki, Wild Dog of the North (1961)
- Nikodem Dyzma (1956)
- Nikolai Vavilov (1990)
- Nikolaikirche (1995 TV)
- Nikos the Impaler (2003)
- Nikto, krome nas... (2008)
- Nikyho velebné dobrodružství (1920)
- Nil Akasher Niche (1969)
- Nil Battey Sannata (2015)
- Nil Diya Yahana (2008)
- Nil Gavani Kadhali (1969)
- Nil Gavani Sellathey (2010)
- Nil by Mouth (1997)
- Nil Nirjane (2003)
- Nila (1994)
- Nila Kaalam (2001 TV)
- Nila Pennae (1990)
- Nilaave Vaa (1998)
- Nilaavinte Naattil (1986)
- Nilachaley Mahaprabhu (1957)
- Nilacholey Kiriti (2018)
- Nilalang (2015)
- Nilam (1949)
- Nilanjana (2017)
- Nilave Malare (1986)
- Nilave Mugam Kaattu (1999)
- Nilavu (2010)
- Nilavu Suduvathillai (1984)
- The Nile Hilton Incident (2017)
- Niloofar (2007)
- Nim Him (2020)
- Nim's Island (2008)
- Nimbe (2019)
- Nimed marmortahvlil (2002)
- Nimirndhu Nil (2014)
- Nimishangal (1986)
- Nimki (2019)
- Nimmo (1984)
- Nimnayaka Hudekalawa (2017)
- Nimona (2023)
- Nimrods (2025)

==== Nin ====
- Nina: (2004, 2016 & 2017)
- Nina Forever (2015)
- Nina Takes a Lover (1994)
- Nina Wu (2019)
- Nina, the Flower Girl (1917)
- Nina's Heavenly Delights (2006)
- Nina's House (2005)
- Nina's Journey (2005)
- Nina's Tragedies (2003)
- Nine (2009)
- The Nine Ages of Nakedness (1969)
- Nine Days (2020)
- Nine Days that Changed the World (2010)
- Nine Dead (2009)
- Nine to Five (1980)
- Nine Forty-Five (1934)
- Nine Girls (1944)
- Nine Guests for a Crime (1977)
- Nine Hours to Rama (1963)
- Nine Legends (2016)
- Nine from Little Rock (1964)
- Nine Lives: (1957, 2002, 2005 & 2016)
- Nine Lives Are Not Enough (1941)
- The Nine Lives of Fritz the Cat (1974)
- The Nine Lives of Marion Barry (2009)
- The Nine Lives of Tomas Katz (2000)
- Nine Men (1943)
- Nine Miles Down (2009)
- Nine Months (1995)
- A Nine O'Clock Town (1918)
- Nine Queens (2000)
- The Nines (2007)
- Ninja (2009)
- Ninja Academy (1990)
- Ninja Assassin (2009)
- Ninja III: The Domination (1984)
- Ninja Kids!!! (2011)
- A Ninja Pays Half My Rent (2003)
- Ninja Scroll (1993)
- Ninja: Shadow of a Tear (2013)
- Ninjas vs. Zombies (2008)
- Ninnistham Ennishtam (1986)
- Ninnishtam Ennishtam 2 (2011)
- Ninotchka (1939)
- The Ninth Configuration (1980)
- The Ninth Day (2004)
- The Ninth Gate (1999)
- The Ninth Heart (1979)

==== Nio–Nir ====
- Niobe (1915)
- Nion in the Kabaret de La Vita (1986)
- Nipped (1914)
- The Nipper (1930)
- Nipples & Palm Trees (2012)
- Nippu (2012)
- Nippu Ravva (1993)
- Nippulanti Manishi: (1974 & 1986)
- Nipputo Chelagaatam (1982)
- Nirahua Hindustani (2014)
- Nirahua Hindustani 2 (2017)
- Nirahua Hindustani 3 (2018)
- Nirai Kudam (1969)
- Nirakazhcha (2010)
- Nirakkoottu (1985)
- Nirakudam (1977)
- Nirala (1950)
- Nirali Duniya (1940)
- Niram (1999)
- Niram Maaratha Pookkal (1979)
- Niram Marunna Nimishangal (1982)
- Niramaala (1975)
- Niramulla Ravulkal (1986)
- Nirantharam (1995)
- Niraparaadhi (1984)
- Nirbaak (2015)
- Nirbachana (1994)
- Nirbashito (2014)
- Nirbhay (1996)
- Nirdoshi: (1951 & 1967)
- Nirmala: (1938 & 1948)
- Nirmalyam (1973)
- Nirnayakam (2015)
- Nirupedalu (1954)
- Nirvana (1997)
- Nirvana Street Murder (1990)
- Nirvanna the Band the Show the Movie (2025)

==== Nis–Niz ====
- Nisabdham (2017)
- Nisala Gira (2007)
- Nise: The Heart of Madness (2015)
- Nisekoi (2018)
- Nishaan (1983)
- Nishabd (2007)
- Nishabdham (2020)
- Nishad (2002)
- Nishagandhi (1970)
- Nishan: (1965 & 1978)
- Nishana: (1980 & 1995)
- Nishane Bazi (1989)
- Nishant (1975)
- Nishedhi (1984)
- Nishi Ginza Station (1958)
- Nishi Padma (1970)
- Nishi Trishna (1989)
- Nishkarsha (1993)
- Nishpap Asami (1997)
- Nishpap Munna (2013)
- Nit-Witty Kitty (1951)
- Nitchevo: (1926 & 1936)
- Nite Tales: The Movie (2008)
- Nithyaharitha Nayakan (2018)
- Nithyakanyaka (1963)
- Nitram (2021)
- Nitrate Kisses (1992)
- Nitro (2007)
- Nitro Circus: The Movie (2012)
- Nitti: The Enforcer (1988 TV)
- The Nitwits (1935)
- Niuma (2010)
- Nivedyam (1978)
- Nivuru Gappina Nippu (1982)
- Nix on Dames (1929)
- Nixchen: (1920 & 1926)
- Nixon (1995)
- Nixon's China Game (2000)
- Niyamam Enthucheyyum (1990)
- Nizhal Moodiya Nirangal (1983)
- Nizhal Nijamagiradhu (1978)
- Nizhal Thedum Nenjangal (1982)
- Nizhal Yudham (1981)
- Nizhalattam (1970)
- Nizhalgal (1980)
- Nizhalkuthu (2002)

=== Nj-Nn ===
- Njaan (2014)
- Njaan Njaan Maathram (1978)
- Njai Dasima: (1929 & 1932)
- Njan Ekananu (1982)
- Njan Gandharvan (1991)
- Njan Kathorthirikkum (1986)
- Njan Kodiswaran (1994)
- Njan Marykutty (2018)
- Njan Ninne Premikkunnu (1975)
- Njan Ninnodu Koodeyundu (2015)
- Njan Piranna Nattil (1985)
- Njan Prakashan (2018)
- Njan Samvidhanam Cheyyum (2015)
- Njan Steve Lopez (2014)
- Njandukalude Nattil Oridavela (2017)
- Njangal Santhushtaranu (1999)
- Njangalude Veettile Athidhikal (2014)
- Njanum Ente Familiyum (2012)
- Njattadi (1979)
- Njavalppazhangal (1976)
- Njësiti guerril (1969)
- Njinga: Queen Of Angola (2013)
- Nna Thaan Case Kodu (2022)
- Nneka the Pretty Serpent: (1994 & 2020)

=== No ===
- No: (1998 & 2012)
- No Address (2025)
- No Babies Wanted (1928)
- No Bears (2022)
- No Bed of Roses (2017)
- No Bigger than a Minute (2006)
- No Blade of Grass (1970)
- No Blood No Tears (2002)
- No Boyfriend Since Birth (2015)
- No Breathing (2013)
- No Burqas Behind Bars (2013)
- No Census, No Feeling (1940)
- No Child of Mine (1997)
- No Clue (2013)
- No Code of Conduct (1998)
- No Contest (1995)
- No Contest II (1997)
- No Country for Old Men (2007)
- No Crossover: The Trial of Allen Iverson (2010)
- No Date, No Signature (2017)
- No Day Without You (1933)
- No Defense (1929)
- No Deposit (2015)
- No Deposit, No Return (1976)
- No Dessert, Dad, till You Mow the Lawn (1994)
- No Direction Home (2005)
- No Distance Left to Run (2010)
- No Dough Boys (1944)
- No Down Payment (1957)
- No Drums, No Bugles (1972)
- No End (1985)
- No End in Sight (2007)
- No Entrance (1960)
- No Entry (2005)
- No Entry Pudhe Dhoka Aahey (2012)
- No Escape: (1934, 1936, 1953, 1994 & 2015)
- No Evidence of Disease (2013)
- No Exit: (1930, 1962, 1995 & 2022)
- No Fathers in Kashmir (2019)
- No Fear, No Die (1990)
- No Filter (2016)
- No Funny Business (1933)
- No Game, No Life Zero (2017)
- No God, No Master (2012)
- No Gold for a Dead Diver (1974)
- No Good Deed: (2002, 2014 & 2017)
- No Greater Glory (1934)
- No Greater Law (2018)
- No Greater Love: (1952, 1960, 1996 & 2010)
- No Hair Day (1999)
- No Hands on the Clock (1941)
- No Hard Feelings (2023)
- No Highway in the Sky (1951)
- No Holds Barred: (1952 & 1989)
- No Home Movie (2015)
- No Hunting (1955)
- No Impact Man (2009)
- No Joke (2013)
- No Kidding (1960)
- No Lady (1931)
- No Land's Song (2014)
- No Leave, No Love (1946)
- No Letting Go (2015)
- No Lies (1973)
- No Limit: (1931, 1935, 2006 & 2011)
- No Limit Kids: Much Ado About Middle School (2010)
- No Lonely Angels (2002)
- No Longer 17 (2003)
- No Looking Back (1998)
- No Love for Johnnie (1961)
- No Man of God (2021)
- No Man of Her Own: (1932 & 1950)
- No Man Is an Island (1962)
- No Man's Gold (1926)
- No Man's Land: (1918, 1939, 1984, 1985, 1987, 2001 & 2013)
- No Man's Law (1927)
- No Man's Range (1935)
- No Man's Woman (1955)
- No Manches Frida (2016)
- No Manches Frida 2 (2019)
- No Maps for These Territories (2000)
- No Marriage Ties (1933)
- No Me Digas Solterona (2018)
- No Men Beyond This Point (2015)
- No Mercy: (1986, 2010 & 2019)
- The No Mercy Man (1973)
- No Mercy for the Rude (2006)
- No Minor Vices (1948)
- No Money Needed (1932)
- No Monkey Business (1935)
- No More Easy Life (1979)
- No More Hiroshima (1984)
- No More Ladies (1935)
- No More Love (1931)
- No More Love, No More Death (1993)
- No More Mr. Nice Guy (1993)
- No More Orchids (1932)
- No More Sunsets (2006)
- No More Tears Sister (2005)
- No More Women (1934)
- No Mother to Guide Her (1923)
- No My Darling Daughter (1961)
- No Name on the Bullet (1959)
- No Names on the Doors (1997)
- No Night Is Too Long (2002)
- No No Sleep (2015)
- No No: A Dockumentary (2014)
- No Noise (1923)
- No Nukes (1980)
- No One Gets Out Alive (2021)
- No One Killed Jessica (2011)
- No One Lives (2013)
- No One Will Play with Me (1976)
- No One Will Save You (2023)
- No One Would Tell (1996)
- No Orchids for Miss Blandish (1948)
- No Other Land (2024)
- No Regret (2006)
- No Regrets for Our Youth (1946)
- No Reservations (2007)
- No Retreat, No Surrender (1986)
- No Retreat, No Surrender 2 (1988)
- No Right Turn (2009)
- No Rules (2005)
- No Skin Off My Ass (1991)
- No Small Affair (1984)
- No Smoking: (1951 & 2007)
- No sos vos, soy yo (2004)
- No Strings Attached (2011)
- No Such Thing (2002)
- No Sudden Move (2021)
- No Surgery Hours Today (1948)
- No Surrender (1985)
- No Tears for the Dead (2014)
- No Time for Love (1943)
- No Time for Nuts (2006)
- No Time for Sergeants (1958)
- No Through Road (2008)
- No Way Back: (1949, 1953, 1976 & 1995)
- No Way Home (1996)
- No Way Out: (1950, 1973 & 1987)
- No Way to Treat a Lady (1968)
- No Way Up (2024)

==== Noa–Nob ====
- Noa at 17 (1982)
- Noah: (1998, 2013 & 2014)
- The Noah (1975)
- Noah's Arc: Jumping the Broom (2008)
- Noah's Arc: The Short Film (2004)
- Noah's Ark: (1928, 1999 TV & 2007)
- The Noah's Ark Principle (1984)
- Nob Hill (1945)
- Nobel Son (2006)
- Nobel's Last Will (2012)
- Nobelity (2006)
- The Noble Family (2013)
- Noble Savage (2018)
- A Noble Spirit (2014)
- Noblemen (2017)
- Nobleza baturra (1935)
- Nobleza gaucha: (1915 & 1937)
- Nobleza ranchera (1977)
- Nobody: (1921 & 2021)
- Nobody 2 (2025)
- Nobody Dies Twice (1953)
- Nobody Gets Out Alive (2012)
- Nobody Home (1919)
- Nobody Knows: (1920, 1970 & 2004)
- Nobody Knows About Sex (2006)
- Nobody Knows Anybody (1999)
- Nobody Lives Forever (1946)
- Nobody, Nobody But... Juan (2009)
- Nobody Ordered Love (1972)
- Nobody Owns Me (2013)
- Nobody Runs Forever (1968)
- Nobody Sleeps in the Woods Tonight (2020)
- Nobody Speak: Trials of the Free Press (2017)
- Nobody Walks (2012)
- Nobody Waved Good-bye (1964)
- Nobody Will Know (1953)
- Nobody Will Speak of Us When We're Dead (1995)
- Nobody's Baby: (1937 & 2001)
- Nobody's Boy (1913)
- Nobody's Darling (1943)
- Nobody's Daughter (1976)
- Nobody's Daughter Haewon (2013)
- Nobody's Fool: (1921, 1936, 1986, 1994 & 2018)
- Nobody's Money (1923)
- Nobody's Perfect: (1968, 1990 & 2004)
- Nobody's Perfekt (1981)
- Nobody's Son (1917)
- Nobody's Widow (1927)
- Nobody's Wife: (1937 & 1950)
- Nobunaga Concerto (2016)

==== Noc–Nom ====
- Noc Walpurgi (2015)
- Nocebo (2023)
- Una Noche (2012)
- La noche del pecado (1933)
- Una Noche en El Relámpago (1950)
- Nocturama (2016)
- Nocturna (2007)
- Nocturna Artificialia (1979)
- Nocturna: Granddaughter of Dracula (1979)
- Nocturnal Animals (2016)
- Nocturnal Butterfly (1941)
- Nocturne: (1946, 2019 & 2020)
- Nocturne 29 (1968)
- Nocturne Indien (1989)
- Nocturne of Love: (1919 & 1948)
- Nøddebo Præstegård: (1934 & 1974)
- Nodi Swamy Navirodu Hige (1983)
- Nodir Naam Modhumoti (1996)
- Nodo jimankyō jidai (1949)
- Noel (2004)
- Noël Noël (2003)
- Noel's Fantastic Trip (1983)
- Noelle (2019)
- Noëlle (2007)
- Noi the Albino (2003)
- Noi credevamo (2010)
- Noi peccatori (1953)
- Noi siamo due evasi (1959)
- Noi siamo le colonne (1956)
- Noi uomini duri (1987)
- Noir (2015)
- Noir et Blanc (1986)
- Noir Drive (2008)
- Noirs et blancs en couleur (1976)
- Noise: (2007 American & 2007 Australian)
- A Noise from the Deep (1913)
- The Noiseless Dead (1946)
- Noises Off (1992)
- A Noisy Household (1946)
- Noisy Noises (1929)
- Noita palaa elämään (1952)
- Noites Cariocas (1936)
- Nokas (2010)
- Nokkethadhoorathu Kannum Nattu (1985)
- Nokkukuthi (1983)
- Nola (2003)
- Nola and the Clones (2016)
- Nollywood Babylon (2008)
- Nolok (2019)
- The Noltenius Brothers (1945)
- Nomad: (1982 & 2005)
- Nomad: In the Footsteps of Bruce Chatwin (2019)
- Nomad: The Warrior (2005)
- Nomadland (2020)
- Nomads: (1986 & 2010)
- Nomads of the North (1920)
- Nombarathi Poovu (1987)
- The Nomi Song (2004)
- Nommara 17 (1989)
- Nomu (1974)
- Nomugi Pass (1979)

==== Non ====
- Non-chan Kumo ni Noru (1955)
- Non ci resta che il crimine (2019)
- Non-Fiction (2018)
- Non è vero... ma ci credo (1952)
- Non ho paura di vivere (1952)
- Non me lo dire! (1940)
- Non pensarci (2007)
- Non perdiamo la testa (1959)
- Non son degno di te (1965)
- Non-Stop (2014)
- The Non-Stop Flight (1926)
- The Non-Stop Fright (1927)
- The Non-Stop Kid (1918)
- Non-Stop New York (1937)
- Non ti pago! (1942)
- The Nona Tapes (1995)
- Nonchan Noriben (2009)
- None but the Brave: (1928, 1960 & 1965)
- None Less Than Heroes: The Honor Flight Story (2011)
- None but the Lonely Heart (1944)
- None Shall Escape (1944)
- The Nonentity (1922)
- Nongjungjo (1926)
- Nonnie & Alex (1995)
- Nonsense Revolution (2008)

==== Noo–Nop ====
- Noo Hin: The Movie (2006)
- Noobz (2012)
- Noodle (2007)
- Nool Veli (1979)
- Noon (1968)
- The Noon of the 10th Day (1988)
- The Noon Gun (2004)
- Noon at Ngayon: Pagsasamang Kay Ganda (2003)
- Noon Sunday (1970)
- The Noon Whistle (1923)
- Noor Jahaan (2018)
- Noor Jehan (1967)
- Noor pensionär (1972)
- Nooravathu Naal (1984)
- Noored kotkad (1927)
- Noorondu Nenapu (2017)
- Nooru Janmaku (2010)
- Noose: (1948 & 1958)
- The Noose (1928)
- A Noose for Django (1969)
- Noose for a Gunman (1960)
- The Noose Hangs High (1948)
- Noose for a Lady (1953)
- Noothi Lo Kappalu (2015)
- Nootrukku Nooru (1971)
- Nope (2022)

==== Nor ====
- Nor the Moon by Night (1958)
- Nora: (1923, 1944, 2000 & 2008)
- Nora Prentiss (1947)
- Nora's Hair Salon (2004)
- Nora's Hair Salon 2: A Cut Above (2008)
- Norbit (2007)
- Noriega: God's Favorite (2000 TV)
- The Norliss Tapes (1973 TV)
- Norm of the North (2016)
- Norma Jean & Marilyn (1996)
- Norma Jean, Jack & Me (1998)
- Norma Rae (1979)
- Normais, Os – O Filme (2003)
- Normal: (2003, 2007, 2009 & 2026)
- Normal Adolescent Behavior (2007)
- The Normal Heart (2014)
- Normal Life (1996)
- Normal Love (1963)
- The Normals (2012)
- Norman... Is That You? (1976)
- The Norman Rockwell Code (2006)
- Norman Rockwell's World... An American Dream (1972)
- Noroi: The Curse (2005)
- The Norseman (1978)
- El Norte (1983)
- Norte, the End of History (2013)
- North: (1994 & 2009)
- North 24 Kaatham (2013)
- North to Alaska (1960)
- The North Avenue Irregulars (1979)
- North Country (2005)
- North Dallas Forty (1979)
- North East Past: Po Ma Zhang Fei (2017)
- North by Northwest (1959)
- North Shore: (1949 & 1987)
- North Star: (1925 & 1996)
- The North Star: (1943 & 2016)
- North West Mounted Police (1940)
- The North Wind (2021)
- Northanger Abbey: (1987 TV & 2007 TV)
- The Northbound Limited (1927)
- A Northern Affair (2014)
- Northern Lights (2009)
- The Northerners (1992)
- Northfork (2003)
- The Northlander (2016)
- The Northman (2022)
- Northwest Passage (1940)
- Norwegian Wood (2010)
- The Norwood Necklace (1911)

==== Nos ====
- Nos 18 ans (2008)
- À Nos Amours (1983)
- Nos dicen las intocables (1964)
- Nos lleva la tristeza (1965)
- Nos miran (2002)
- Nos vemos, papá (2011)
- The Nose (1977 TV)
- The Nose or the Conspiracy of Mavericks (2020)
- Nose, Iranian Style (2005)
- Nosey Parker (2003)
- Nosferatu: (1922 & 2024)
- Nosferatu the Vampyre (1979)
- Noson Lawen (1949)
- Nosotras las Taquígrafas (1950)
- Nosotros los feos (1973)
- Nosotros los Pobres (1948)
- Nostalghia (1983)
- Nostalgia: (1971 & 2018)
- Nostalgia for the Light (2011)
- The Nostalgist (2014)
- Nostradamus: (1925 & 1994)
- The Nostradamus Kid (1992)

==== Not ====
- Not Afraid of Big Animals (1953)
- Not Angels But Angels (1994)
- Not Another Church Movie (2024)
- Not Another Happy Ending (2013)
- Not Another Not Another Movie (2011)
- Not Another Teen Movie (2001)
- Not Any Weekend for Our Love (1950)
- Not Bad for a Girl (1995)
- Not Cool (2014)
- Not Damaged (1930)
- Not a Drum Was Heard (1924)
- Not Easily Broken (2009)
- Not Everybody's Lucky Enough to Have Communist Parents (1993)
- Not Evil Just Wrong (2009)
- Not Exactly Gentlemen (1931)
- Not Fade Away (2012)
- Not a Feather, but a Dot (2012)
- Not For, or Against (2003)
- Not Forgotten (2009)
- Not Going Quietly (2021)
- Not Guilty: (1908, 1910, 1919 & 1947)
- Not Here to Be Loved (2005)
- Not Human (2013)
- Not a Ladies' Man (1942)
- Not Like Everyone Else (2006)
- Not Like Us (1995)
- Not on the Lips (2003)
- Not Love, Just Frenzy (1996)
- Not a Love Story (2011)
- Not a Love Story: A Film About Pornography (1982)
- Not Me! (1996)
- Not Much Force (1915)
- Not My Day (2014)
- Not My Kid (1985)
- Not My Life (2006)
- Not My Life (2011)
- Not My Sister (1916)
- Not My Type (2014)
- Not with My Wife, You Don't! (1966)
- Not Negotiable (1918)
- Not Now (1936)
- Not Now, Comrade (1976)
- Not Now, Darling (1973)
- Not Okay (2022)
- Not One Less (1999)
- Not Only But Always (2004)
- Not Only Mrs. Raut (2003)
- Not like Others (2008)
- Not for Ourselves Alone (1999)
- Not a Photograph: The Mission of Burma Story (2006)
- Not for Publication: (1927 & 1984)
- Not a Pretty Picture (1976)
- Not Quite Decent (1929)
- Not Quite Hollywood: The Wild, Untold Story of Ozploitation! (2008)
- Not Quite Human (1987)
- Not Quite Human II (1989)
- Not Quite a Lady (1928)
- Not Quite Paradise (1985)
- Not Reconciled (1965)
- Not Safe for Work (2014)
- Not for Sale (1924)
- Not Since You (2009)
- Not So Dumb (1930)
- Not So Dusty: (1936 & 1956)
- Not So Long Ago (1925)
- Not So Quiet (1930)
- Not So Quiet on the Western Front (1930)
- Not as a Stranger (1955)
- Not So Stupid: (1928 & 1946)
- Not Suitable for Children (2012)
- Not of This Earth: (1957, 1988 & 1995)
- Not Three (1964)
- Not Tonight Henry (1960)
- Not Under the Jurisdiction (1969)
- Not Wanted (1949)
- Not Wanted on Voyage (1957)
- Not Waving but Drowning (2012)
- Not Without Gisela (1951)
- Not Without Hope (2025)
- Not Without My Daughter (1991)
- Not Without My Handbag (1993)
- Not of the Woman Born (1918)
- Not a Word About Love (1937)
- Not of this World (1999)
- Not Worth a Fig (2009)
- Not Your Typical Bigfoot Movie (2008)
- Notch Number One (1924)
- Note (2015)
- The Note (2007)
- Note by Note: The Making of Steinway L1037 (2007)
- Note Out (2011)
- A Note of Triumph: The Golden Age of Norman Corwin (2005)
- Notebook: (2006, 2013 & 2019)
- The Notebook: (2004 & 2013)
- The Notebooks of Memory (2009)
- Notes (2013)
- Notes on Blindness (2016)
- Notes to Eternity (2016)
- Notes for a Film About Donna and Gail (1966)
- Notes of Love (1998)
- Notes for My Son (2020)
- Notes on the Port of St. Francis (1951)
- Notes on a Scandal (2007)
- Notes Towards an African Orestes (1970)
- Notes to You (1941)
- Notfilm (2015)
- Nothing (2004)
- Nothing Bad Can Happen (2013)
- Nothing Barred (1961)
- Nothing but the Blues (1995)
- Nothing But Coincidence (1949)
- Nothing But Lies (1991)
- Nothing But Pleasure (1940)
- Nothing But the Truth: (1929, 1941, 2008 American & 2008 South African)
- Nothing but the Best (1964)
- Nothing by Chance (1975)
- Nothing in Common (1986)
- Nothing to Declare (2010)
- Nothing Else Matters (1920)
- The Nothing Factory (2017)
- Nothing Funny (1995)
- Nothing Has Ever Happened Here (2016)
- Nothing to Hide: (1981 & 2018)
- Nothing like the Holidays (2008)
- Nothing Lasts Forever (1984)
- Nothing Left to Do But Cry (1984)
- Nothing Left to Fear (2013)
- Nothing Left Unsaid: Gloria Vanderbilt & Anderson Cooper (2016)
- Nothing Less Than an Archangel (1960)
- Nothing Less Than a Real Man (1972)
- Nothing but Life (2004)
- Nothing Like a Dame (2018)
- Nothing Like Experience (1970)
- Nothing Like Publicity (1936)
- Nothing to Lose: (1997 & 2002)
- Nothing but a Man (1964)
- Nothing More (2001)
- Nothing More Than a Woman (1934)
- Nothing but the Night (1973)
- Nothing Personal: (1980, 1995, 2007 & 2009)
- Nothing in Return (2015)
- Nothing Sacred (1937)
- Nothing Shall Be Hidden (1912)
- Nothing So Strange (2002)
- Nothing but Trouble: (1918, 1944 & 1991)
- Nothing but the Truth: (1929, 1941, 2008 American & 2008 South African)
- Nothing Underneath (1985)
- Nothing Venture (1948)
- Nothing to Wear (1928)
- Nothing's All Bad (2010)
- The Notice of the Day (2001)
- Notizie degli scavi (2010)
- Notoriety (2013)
- Notorious: (1946 & 2009)
- Notorious but Nice (1933)
- Notorious Gallagher (1916)
- A Notorious Affair (1930)
- The Notorious Bettie Page (2005)
- The Notorious Elinor Lee (1940)
- The Notorious Lady (1927)
- The Notorious Landlady (1962)
- The Notorious Lone Wolf (1946)
- The Notorious Mr. Bout (2014)
- The Notorious Mr. Monks (1958)
- The Notorious Mrs. Carrick (1924)
- The Notorious Mrs. Sands (1920)
- The Notorious Sophie Lang (1934)
- Notre Dame van de sloppen (1940)
- Notre musique (2004)
- Notre Paradis (2011)
- Notre univers impitoyable (2008)
- Nottam (2006)
- La Notte (1961)
- Una notte, un sogno (1988)
- Le Notti Bianche (1957)
- Notting Hill (1999)
- Notturno (2020)

==== Nou–Nov ====
- Noukadubi: (1947 & 2011)
- Nous aurons toute la mort pour dormir (1977)
- Nous, princesses de Clèves (2011)
- À Nous la Liberté (1931)
- Nousukausi (2003)
- Nouvelle Vague (1990)
- Nova Zembla (2011)
- Novel (2008)
- Novel with a Double Bass (1911)
- Novel Romance (2006)
- A Novel Romance (2011)
- The Novel of Werther (1938)
- The Novelist's Film (2022)
- Novelle licenziose di vergini vogliose (1973)
- November: (2004, 2017 & 2021)
- November 1st (2019)
- November Christmas (2010 TV)
- November Criminals (2017)
- The November Man (2014)
- Novemberinte Nashtam (1982)
- November Rain: (2007 & 2014)
- The Novena (2005)
- Novia a la medida (1949)
- Novia, esposa y amante (1980)
- A Novice at X-Rays (1898)
- Noviembre (2003)
- Novio, marido y amante (1948)
- Novitiate (2017)
- Novocaine (2001 & 2025)

==== Now–Noz ====
- Now Add Honey (2015)
- Now Barabbas (1949)
- Now Do You Get It Why I'm Crying? (1969)
- Now and Ever (2019)
- Now & Forever (2002)
- Now and Forever: (1934, 1956, 1983 & 2006)
- Now Hare This (1958)
- Now Hear This (1963)
- Now I Am Rich (1952)
- Now I'll Tell (1934)
- Now I'll Tell One (1927)
- Now Is Everything (2019)
- Now Is Good (2012)
- Now Is the Time (2019)
- Now or Never: (1921, 1935, 1998 & 2003)
- Now That April's Here (1958)
- Now That I Have You (2004)
- Now That Summer is Gone (1938)
- Now — The Peace (1945)
- Now and Then (1995)
- Now You Know (2002)
- Now You See Love, Now You Don't (1992)
- Now You See Him, Now You Don't (1972)
- Now You See Me series:
  - Now You See Me (2013)
  - Now You See Me 2 (2016)
  - Now You See Me: Now You Don't (2025)
- Now, Forager (2012)
- Now, Voyager (1942)
- Now's the Time (1932)
- Nowhere (1997)
- Nowhere in Africa (2001)
- Nowhere Boy (2009)
- Nowhere Boys: The Book of Shadows (2016)
- Nowhere to Go (1958)
- Nowhere to Hide: (1987, 1994 TV & 1999)
- The Nowhere Inn (2020)
- Nowhere Left to Run (2010)
- Nowhere to Run: (1978 TV, 1989, 1993 & 2015)
- The Nowhere Son (2013)
- Nowhere Special (2020)
- Noy (2010)
- Noy Number Bipod Sanket (2007)
- Noyonmoni (1976)
- Nozoki Ana (2014)

=== Nr ===
- Nrithasala (1972)

=== Nu ===
- Nu går den på Dagmar (1972)
- Nu-Meri: Book of the New Spawn (2008)

==== Nua–Nul ====
- Nua Bou (1962)
- Nuan (2003)
- Nuba Conversations (2000)
- Nubes de humo (1958)
- Nucingen House (2008)
- Nuclear Tipping Point (2010)
- Nude: (2017 & 2018)
- Nude Actress Murder Case: Five Criminals (1957)
- The Nude Bomb (1980)
- Nude in Charcoal (1961)
- Nude Fear (1998)
- Nude on the Moon (1961)
- Nude Nuns with Big Guns (2010)
- The Nude Restaurant (1967)
- Nude for Satan (1974)
- Nude with Violin (1964)
- The Nude Woman: (1922, 1926 & 1932)
- Nudist Colony of the Dead (1991)
- The Nudist Story (1960)
- Nueba Yol (1995)
- Nueve reinas (2000)
- Nugam (2013)
- The Nugget (2002)
- Nugget Nell (1919)
- The Nuisance: (1921 & 1933)
- Nuit 1 (2010)
- Nuit d'ivresse (1986)
- Nuit de chien (2008)
- Nuit noire 17 octobre 1961 (2005)
- Nuits Rouges (1974)
- Nukie (1987)
- Nulli Novikkathe (1985)

==== Num–Nun ====
- Numa Numa (2005)
- Numafung (2004)
- Numb: (2007 & 2015)
- Numba Nadan Apita Pissu (2003)
- The Number (2017)
- Number 1 Cheerleader Camp (2010)
- Number 13 (1922)
- Number 13 (2006) (TV)
- Number 17: (1928 & 1949)
- The Number 23 (2007)
- Number 55 (2014)
- Number 111: (1919 & 1938)
- The Number on Great-Grandpa's Arm (2018)
- Number One: (1969, 1973, 1994 & 2017)
- Number One with a Bullet (1987)
- Number One Fan (2014)
- Number One Shakib Khan (2010)
- Number Our Days (1976)
- Number, Please (1931)
- Number, Please? (1920)
- Number Seventeen (1932)
- Number Ten Blues (1975)
- Number Two (1975)
- Numbered Men (1930)
- Numbered Woman (1938)
- The Numbers Start with the River (1971)
- The Numbers Station (2013)
- Numbri Aadmi (1991)
- Numm (2013)
- The Nun: (1966, 2005, 2013 & 2018)
- The Nun II (2023)
- The Nun and the Bandit (1992)
- A Nun at the Crossroads (1967)
- The Nun and the Devil (1973)
- The Nun and the Harlequin (1918)
- The Nun and the Sergeant (1962)
- The Nun's Night (1967)
- The Nun's Story (1959)
- Nunca pasa nada (1963)
- Nungambakkam (2020)
- Nungshi Feijei (2015)
- Nungshit Mapi (2015)
- Nunnunarvu (2016)
- Nuns on the Run (1990)
- Nunzio (1978)

==== Nuo–Nuv ====
- Nuovomondo (2006)
- Nur eine Frau (1958)
- Nur Kasih The Movie (2011)
- Nurayum Pathayum (1977)
- Nuregami kenpō (1958)
- Nuremberg (2000)
- Nuremberg: The Nazis Facing their Crimes (2006)
- Nuremberg Trials (1947)
- Nurit (1972)
- Nurmoo: Shout from the Plain (2009)
- Nurse (1969)
- The Nurse: (1912 & 2017)
- Nurse 3D (2013)
- Nurse Betty (2000)
- The Nurse from Brooklyn (1938)
- Nurse Cavell (1916)
- Nurse Edith Cavell (1939)
- Nurse.Fighter.Boy (2008)
- Nurse Marjorie (1920)
- The Nurse in the Military Madhouse (1979)
- Nurse Report (1972)
- Nurse Sherri (1978)
- Nurse on Wheels (1963)
- The Nurse's Secret (1941)
- The Nursemaid Who Disappeared (1939)
- The Nurses (1984)
- Nursie! Nursie! (1916)
- Nursing a Viper (1909)
- The Nut (1921)
- The Nut Farm (1935)
- The Nut Job (2014)
- The Nut Job 2: Nutty by Nature (2017)
- Nutcase (1980)
- Nutcracker (1982)
- The Nutcracker: (1967, 1973 & 1993)
- The Nutcracker in 3D (2010)
- Nutcracker Fantasy (1979)
- The Nutcracker and the Four Realms (2018)
- Nutcracker: The Motion Picture (1986)
- The Nutcracker Prince (1990)
- The Nutcracker Story (2017)
- The Nuthouse (1951)
- Nuts: (1987, 2012 & 2018)
- Nuts! (2016)
- Nuts & Bolts (2003)
- Nuts for Love (2000)
- Nuts in May: (1917 & 1976)
- Nuts and Volts (1964)
- The Nutt House (1992)
- The Nuttiest Nutcracker (1999)
- Nutty, Naughty Chateau (1963)
- Nutty News (1942)
- Nutty but Nice (1940)
- The Nutty Professor: (1963, 1996 & 2008)
- Nutty Professor II: The Klumps (2000)
- Nuummioq (2009)
- Nuvva Nena (2012)
- Nuvvala Nenila (2013)
- Nuvvante Naakishtam (2005)
- Nuvve Kavali (2000)
- Nuvve Nuvve (2002)
- Nuvvekkadunte Nenakkadunta (2012)
- Nuvvila (2011)
- Nuvvostanante Nenoddantana (2005)
- Nuvvu Leka Nenu Lenu (2002)
- Nuvvu Naaku Nachav (2001)
- Nuvvu Nenu (2001)
- Nuvvu Thopu Raa (2019)
- Nuvvu Vastavani (2000)

=== Ny–Nz ===
- Nya (2017)
- Nya hyss av Emil i Lönneberga (1972)
- Nyay Anyay (1990)
- Nyaya Ellide (1982)
- Nyaya Gedditu (1983)
- Nyaya Neethi Dharma (1980)
- Nyaya Tharasu (1989)
- Nyayam Kavali (1981)
- Nyayam Ketkirom (1973)
- Nyayam Meere Cheppali (1985)
- Nyayave Devaru (1971)
- Nyayavidhi (1986)
- Nyaydaata (1999)
- Nyaay: The Justice (2021)
- Nyad (2023)
- Nyay Anyay (1990)
- Nyaya Ellide (1982)
- Nyaya Gedditu (1983)
- Nyaya Neethi Dharma (1980)
- Nyaya Tharasu (1989)
- Nyayam Kavali (1981)
- Nyayam Ketkirom (1973)
- Nyayam Meere Cheppali (1985)
- Nyayangal Jayikkattum (1990)
- Nyayave Devaru (1971)
- Nyayavidhi (1986)
- Nyfes (2004)
- Nymph: (1973 & 2009)
- The Nymph (1996)
- Nymphomaniac (2013)
- Nzambi Mpungu (1928)

== O ==
- O (2001 & 2022)
- O21 (2014)
- O Amor Natural (1996)
- O Baby (1926, 2019, & 2020)
- O-Bi, O-Ba: The End of Civilization (1985)
- O Bobo (1987)
- O, Brazen Age (2015)
- O Brother, Where Art Thou? (2000)
- O Canada! (1981)
- O Cangaceiro (1953)
- O Carnaval Cantado de 1932 (1932)
- O Carteiro (2011)
- O Casamento de Romeu e Julieta (2005)
- O Chinadana (2002)
- O Circo das Qualidades Humanas (2000)
- O.C. and Stiggs (1987)
- O... Çocuklari (2008)
- O Concurso (2013)
- O'Dessa (2025)
- O Ébrio (1946)
- O Fantasma (2000)
- O Friend, This Waiting! (2012)
- O.G. (2018)
- O Garimpeiro (1920)
- OHMS (1980)
- O.H.M.S. (1937)
- O Homem Que Copiava (2003)
- O Horizon (2026)
- O' Horten (2007)
- O.J.: Made in America (2016)
- The O. J. Simpson Story (1995)
- O Jogo da Vida (1977)
- o.k. (1970)
- OK Baytong (2003)
- OK Connery (1967)
- OK Garage (1998)
- OK, Good (2012)
- O.K. ... Laliberté (1973)
- O.K. Nerone (1951)
- The O'Kalems Visit Killarney (1912)
- O-Kay for Sound (1937)
- O Lucky Man!: (1973 & 2009)
- O'Malley of the Mounted: (1921 & 1936)
- OMG, I'm a Robot! (2015)
- OMG – Oh My God! (2012)
- OMG... We're in a Horror Movie!!! (2015)
- O, more, more! (1983)
- O, My Darling Clementine (1943)
- O Nanna Nalle (2000)
- The O'Neill (1912)
- O Noviço Rebelde (1997)
- O Pagador de Promessas (1962)
- Ó Paí, Ó (2007)
- O Pioneers! (1992)
- O'Shaughnessy's Boy (1935)
- O.S.S. (1946)
- OSS 117 series:
  - OSS 117 Is Not Dead (1957)
  - OSS 117 Is Unleashed (1963)
  - Shadow of Evil (1964)
  - OSS 117 Mission for a Killer (1965)
  - Atout cœur à Tokyo pour OSS 117 (1966)
  - OSS 117 – Double Agent (1968)
  - OSS 117 Takes a Vacation (1970)
  - OSS 117: Cairo, Nest of Spies (2006)
  - OSS 117: Lost in Rio (2009)
  - OSS 117: From Africa with Love (2021)
- OSS 77 – Operazione fior di loto (1965)
- O Shaolin do Sertão (2016)
- O'Shaughnessy's Boy (1935)
- O-Solar Meow (1967)
- OT: Our Town (2002)
- O-Town (2015)
- O, Vrba (1945)

=== Oa–Ob ===
- The Oak (1992)
- The Oak Room (2020)
- Oasis: (1955 & 2002)
- The Oasis (2008)
- Oasis of Fear (1971)
- Oasis of the Zombies (1981)
- The Oath: (1921 American, 1921 British, 2010, 2016 & 2018)
- Oath-Bound (1922)
- The Oath and the Man (1910)
- The Oath of Peter Hergatz (1921)
- The Oath of Pierre (1913)
- The Oath of Stephan Huller (1921)
- The Oath of Tsuru San (1913)
- Oath of Vengeance (1944)
- Oba: The Last Samurai (2011)
- Oba Koheda Priye (2001)
- Oba Nathuwa Oba Ekka (2012)
- Obaltan (1960)
- Obeah! (1935)
- Oberst Redl (1985)
- Obey Giant (2017)
- Obey the Law: (1926 & 1933)
- Obhishopto Nighty (2014)
- Obit (2016)
- The Object of Beauty (1991)
- The Object of My Affection (1998)
- Objectified (2009)
- The Objective (2008)
- Objective, Burma! (1945)
- The Obligin' Buckaroo (1927)
- Obliging Young Lady (1942)
- Oblique (2008)
- Oblivion: (1994 & 2013)
- Oblivion 2: Backlash (1996)
- Oblivion Island: Haruka and the Magic Mirror (2009)
- Oblivion, Nebraska (2006)
- Oblivious (2001)
- The Oblong Box (1969)
- Obon Brothers (2015)
- Oboreru Knife (2016)
- Obselidia (2010)
- Observe and Report (2009)
- Obsessed: (1987, 1992, 2009 & 2014)
- The Obsessed of Catule (1965)
- Obsession: (1949, 1954, 1976, 1997 & 2025)
- Obsession: Radical Islam's War Against the West (2005)
- Obsessive Love (1984 TV)
- An Obsolete Altar (2013)
- The Obtrusive Wife (1953)
- Obvious Child (2014)
- An Obvious Situation (1930)

=== Oc ===
- Ocaña, an Intermittent Portrait (1978)
- El ocaso del socialismo mágico (2016)
- The Ocarina (1919)
- Occhio, malocchio, prezzemolo e finocchio (1983)
- Occident (2002)
- Occult (2009)
- Occupant (2011)
- Occupation (2018)
- Occupation in 26 Pictures (1978)
- Occupation 101 (2006)
- Occupation: Dreamland (2005)
- Occupation: Rainfall (2020)
- Occupied Minds (2006)
- An Occurrence at Owl Creek Bridge (1962)
- Ocean (2002)
- The Ocean (2006)
- Ocean Breakers (1935)
- Ocean of Fear (2007 TV)
- Ocean Heaven (2010)
- Ocean of Pearls (2008)
- Ocean of Tears (2012)
- Ocean Waves (1993)
- Oceans (2009)
- Ocean's series:
  - Ocean's Eleven: (1960 & 2001)
  - Ocean's Twelve (2004)
  - Ocean's Thirteen (2007)
  - Ocean's 8 (2018)
- Ocean's Deadliest (2007)
- Oceans of Fire (1986 TV)
- Oceanus: Act One (2015)
- OceanWorld 3D (2009)
- Oconomowoc (2013)
- The Octagon (1980)
- Octaman (1971)
- Octane (2003)
- Octavia (1984)
- Octavio Is Dead! (2018)
- October: (2010 & 2018)
- October 22 (1998)
- October Days (1958)
- October Gale (2014)
- The October Man (1947)
- October Moon (2005)
- October November (2013)
- October Sky (1999)
- October: Ten Days That Shook the World (1928)
- Octopus 2: River of Fear (2001)
- Octopussy (1983)
- The Octoroon: (1909 & 1912)
- Oculus (2013)

=== Od ===
- Odaruthammava Aalariyam (1984)
- Odayil Ninnu (1965)
- The Odd Angry Shot (1979)
- Odd Couple (1979)
- The Odd Couple (1968)
- The Odd Couple II (1998)
- The Odd Family: Zombie On Sale (2019)
- Odd Girl Out (2005 TV)
- Odd Job (2016)
- The Odd Job (1978)
- Odd Jobs (1986)
- The Odd Life of Timothy Green (2012)
- Odd Man Out (1947)
- Odd Thomas (2013)
- The Odd Way Home (2013)
- Oddball (2015)
- Oddball Hall (1991)
- The Odds Against (1966)
- The Odds Against Her (1919)
- Odds Against Tomorrow (1959)
- The Oddsockeaters (2016)
- The Ode (2008)
- Ode to Joy (2019)
- Odette: (1916, 1928, 1934 & 1950)
- Odette Toulemonde (2006)
- The Odessa File (1974)
- Odongo (1956)
- Odor of the Day (1948)
- Odor-able Kitty (1945)
- Odour of Chrysanthemums (2002)
- Odysseus and the Isle of the Mists (2008)
- Odysseus' Gambit (2011)
- The Odyssey: (2016 & 2026)
- An Odyssey of the North (1914)

=== Oe–Og ===
- Oedipus the King (1968)
- Oedipus Mayor (1996)
- Oedipus Orca (1977)
- Oedipus Rex: (1957 & 1967)
- Of All the Things (2012)
- Of Cash and Hash (1955)
- Of Course, the Motorists (1959)
- Of Dolls and Murder (2012)
- Of Fathers and Sons (2017)
- Of Feline Bondage (1965)
- Of Fox and Hounds (1940)
- Of Freaks and Men (1998)
- Of Gods and Men (2010)
- Of Horses and Men (2013)
- Of Human Bondage: (1934, 1946 & 1964)
- Of Human Hearts (1938)
- Of Mice and Men: (1939, 1968 TV & 1992)
- Of Time and the City (2008)
- Off the Grid (2025)
- The Off Hours (2011)
- Off Limits: (1953 & 1988)
- Off the Map (2007)
- Off the Ropes: (1999 & 2011)
- Off Season: (1992 & 2012)
- The Off Season (2004)
- Off Sides (Pigs vs. Freaks) (1984 TV)
- Off-Balance (2000)
- The Off-Shore Pirate (1921)
- The Offence (1973)
- The Offenders (1921)
- The Offering (2023)
- Office: (2015 Hong Kong & 2015 South Korean)
- The Office (1966)
- Office Christmas Party (2016)
- Office Girls (2011)
- Office Killer (1997)
- The Office Manager (1931)
- The Office Party (1976)
- The Office Picnic (1972)
- Office Romance: (1977 & 2026)
- The Office Scandal (1929)
- Office Space (1999)
- The Office Wife: (1930 & 1934)
- Officer: (2001 & 2018)
- Officer 444 (1926)
- Officer 666 (1916)
- An Officer and a Car Salesman (1988 TV)
- Officer Down (2013)
- Officer Downe (2016)
- Officer Duck (1939)
- An Officer and a Gentleman (1982)
- An Officer and a Murderer (2012 TV)
- An Officer and a Spy (2019)
- Officer Thirteen (1932)
- The Officer's Swordknot (1915)
- Officers (1971)
- The Officers' Mess (1931)
- The Officers' Ward (2001)
- Official Competition (2021)
- Official Secrets (2019)
- The Official Story (1985)
- OffOn (1972)
- Offside: (2000, 2005, 2006 Iranian, 2006 Swedish & 2009)
- Offspring: (1996 & 2009)
- Oggi sposi: (1952 & 2009)
- Oggy and the Cockroaches: The Movie (2013)
- Ogo Bodhu Shundori (1981)
- Ograblenie po... (1978)
- Ogre (2008 TV)
- The Ogre: (1989 & 1996)
- The Ogre of Athens (1956)
- Ogu and Mampato in Rapa Nui (2002)

=== Oh ===
- Oh Billy, Behave (1926)
- Oh Boy!: (1938 & 1991)
- Oh Dad, Poor Dad, Mamma's Hung You in the Closet and I'm Feelin' So Sad (1967)
- Oh Doctor!: (1917 & 1925)
- Oh! Heavenly Dog (1980)
- Oh Johnny, How You Can Love (1940)
- Oh La La! (2006)
- Oh Lucy!: (2014 & 2017)
- Oh Mabel (1924)
- Oh Mary Be Careful (1921)
- Oh Mong-nyeo (1937)
- The Oh in Ohio (2006)
- Oh My God: (2009 & 2015)
- Oh! My God (2006)
- Oh, My Nerves (1935)
- Oh! My Zombie Mermaid (2004)
- Oh No Doctor! (1934)
- Oh Olsun (1973)
- Oh Sailor Behave (1930)
- Oh Schuks... I'm Gatvol (2004)
- Oh Teacher (1927)
- Oh! What a Lovely War (1969)
- Oh Yaara Ainvayi Ainvayi Lut Gaya (2015)
- Oh, God! (1977)
- Oh, God! Book II (1980)
- Oh, God! You Devil (1984)
- Oh, Hi! (2025)
- Oh, Men! Oh, Women! (1957)
- Oh, Mr. Porter! (1937)
- Oh, Saigon (2007)
- Oh, Susanna! (1936)
- Oh, What a Night: (1935, 1944 & 1992)
- Oh, You Women! (1919)
- Oh... Rosalinda!! (1955)
- Oha! Ako Pa?! (1994)
- Ohan (1984)
- Ohileshwara (1956)
- Ohm Krüger (1941)
- Ohm Shanthi Oshaana (2014)
- Ohne Pass in fremden Betten (1965)
- Ohoma Harida (2004)
- Ohtlikud mängud (1974)

=== Oi–Oj ===
- Oi kyries tis avlis (1967)
- Oi paranomoi (1958)
- Oi Thalassies oi Hadres (1967)
- Oil (2009)
- The Oil, the Baby and the Transylvanians (1981)
- Oil Extraction (1907)
- The Oil Factor (2005)
- Oil Gobblers (1988)
- The Oil Gush in Balakhany (1898)
- The Oil Gush Fire in Bibiheybat (1898)
- The Oil-Hell Murder (1992)
- Oil on Ice (2004)
- Oil Lamps (1971)
- Oil for the Lamps of China (1935)
- The Oil Prince (1965)
- The Oil Raider (1934)
- Oil Sands Karaoke (2013)
- The Oil Sharks (1933)
- Oil Storm (2005)
- Oil and Water (1913)
- Oil's Well (1929)
- Oil's Well That Ends Well (1958)
- Oily to Bed, Oily to Rise (1939)
- Oily Hare (1952)
- Oink (1995)
- Oisin (1970)
- Ojarumaru the Movie: The Promised Summer - Ojaru and Semira (2000)
- Ojuju (2014)

=== Ok ===
- Ok Jaanu (2017)
- Ok-nyeo (1928)
- Oka Chinna Maata (1997)
- Oka Criminal Prema Katha (2014)
- Oka Laila Kosam (2014)
- Oka Manasu (2016)
- Oka Oori Katha (1977)
- Oka Oorilo (2005)
- Oka Pellam Muddu Rendo Pellam Vaddu (2004)
- Oka Radha Iddaru Krishnula Pelli (2003)
- Oka Radha Iddaru Krishnulu (1986)
- Oka Raju Oka Rani (2003)
- Oka V Chitram (2006)
- Okafor's Law (2016)
- Okāsan no Ki (2015)
- Okay, America! (1932)
- Okay Bill (1971)
- Oke Kutumbham (1970)
- Oke Maata (2000)
- Oki's Movie (2010)
- Okie Noodling (2001)
- Okinawa (1952)
- Okinawa Rendez-vous (2000)
- Okja (2017)
- Okka Ammayi Thappa (2016)
- Okka Kshanam (2017)
- Okka Magaadu (2008)
- Okkade (2005)
- Okkadine (2013)
- Okkadu (2003)
- Okkadunnadu (2007)
- Oklahoma Annie (1952)
- Oklahoma Badlands (1948)
- Oklahoma Blues (1948)
- An Oklahoma Cowboy (1929)
- Oklahoma Crude (1973)
- Oklahoma Cyclone (1930)
- Oklahoma Frontier (1939)
- Oklahoma John (1965)
- Oklahoma Justice (1951)
- The Oklahoma Kid (1939)
- Oklahoma Raiders (1944)
- Oklahoma Renegades (1940)
- Oklahoma Territory (1960)
- Oklahoma Terror (1939)
- The Oklahoma Woman (1956)
- Oklahoma!: (1955 & 1999)
- The Oklahoman (1957)
- Oko proroka (1982)
- Okoge (1992)
- Okouzlená (1942)
- Okraina: (1933 & 1998)
- Oktoberfest (1987)
- Okul (2004)

=== Ol ===
- The Ol' Gray Hoss (1928)

==== Ola ====
- Olaf—An Atom (1913)
- Olaf's Frozen Adventure (2017 TV)
- Olave Jeevana Lekkachaara (2009)
- Olave Mandara (2011)
- Olavina Aasare (1988)
- Olavina Udugore (1987)
- Olavu Geluvu (1977)
- Olavu Moodidaga (1984)
- Olavum Theeravum (1970)

==== Old ====
- Old (2021)
- Old 37 (2015)
- Old Acquaintance (1943)
- Old Age Handicap (1928)
- The Old Army Game (1943)
- The Old Bachelor's Dream (1913)
- The Old Ballroom (1925)
- Old Barge, Young Love: (1957 & 1973)
- The Old Barn (1929)
- The Old Barn Dance (1938)
- Old Beast (2017)
- Old Bill and Son (1941)
- Old Bill Through the Ages (1924)
- Old Bones of the River (1938)
- The Old Bookkeeper (1912)
- Old Boyfriends (1979)
- Old Boys (2010)
- Old Boys: The Way of the Dragon (2014)
- Old Boys of Saint-Loup (1950)
- The Old Bus (1934)
- The Old Chisholm Trail (1942)
- The Old Cinderella (2014)
- The Old Cobbler (1914)
- The Old Code (1928)
- The Old Corral (1936)
- The Old Country (1921)
- The Old Country Where Rimbaud Died (1977)
- The Old Curiosity Shop: (1911, 1914, 1921, 1934, 1984 & 2007)
- Old Dads (2023)
- The Old Dark House: (1932 & 1963)
- The Old Doctor's Humanity (1912)
- Old Dog (2011)
- Old Dogs (2009)
- The Old Donkey (2010)
- Old English (1930)
- Old Enough (1984)
- Old Faithful (1935)
- Old Fashioned (2015)
- An Old Fashioned Boy (1920)
- An Old-Fashioned Girl (1949)
- An Old Fashioned Thanksgiving (2008)
- The Old Fashioned Way (1934)
- An Old-Fashioned Young Man (1917)
- The Old Folks at Home (1916)
- The Old Fool (1923)
- The Old Footlight Favorite (1908)
- The Old Forester House (1956)
- The Old Fritz (1928)
- The Old Frontier (1950)
- The Old Garden (2006)
- Old Glory (1939)
- The Old Grey Hare (1944)
- Old Gringo (1989)
- The Old Guard: (1934 & 1960)
- The Old Guard series:
  - The Old Guard (2020)
  - The Old Guard 2 (2025)
- Old Guy (2024)
- Old Heidelberg: (1915, 1923, & 1959)
- Old Henry (2021)
- Old Home Week (1925)
- The Old Homestead: (1915, 1922, 1935, & 1942)
- Old Ironsides (1926)
- The Old Jar Craftsman (1969)
- Old Joy (2007)
- Old King Cole (1933)
- The Old Lady (1932)
- The Old Lady and the Pigeons (1997)
- The Old Lady Who Walked in the Sea (1991)
- An Old Love (1959)
- Old Loves and New (1926)
- Old MacDonald Duck (1941)
- Old MacDonald Had a Farm (1946)
- The Old Maid: (1939 & 1972)
- The Old Maid's Valentine (1900)
- The Old Man: (1931 & 2012)
- The Old Man of Belem (2014)
- The Old Man & the Gun (2018)
- The Old Man of the Mountain (1933)
- The Old Man and the Sea: (1958, 1990 TV & 1999)
- The Old Man and the Seymour (2009)
- The Old Man Who Cried Wolf (1970)
- The Old Man Who Read Love Stories (2001)
- The Old Mill (1937)
- The Old Mill on Mols (1953)
- The Old Mill Pond (1936)
- Old Monk (2022)
- The Old Monk's Tale (1913)
- Old Mother Riley (1937)
- Old Mother Riley in Business (1941)
- Old Mother Riley Detective (1943)
- Old Mother Riley Headmistress (1950)
- Old Mother Riley at Home (1945)
- Old Mother Riley Joins Up (1940)
- Old Mother Riley Overseas (1943)
- Old Mother Riley in Paris (1938)
- Old Mother Riley in Society (1940)
- Old Mother Riley, MP (1939)
- Old Mother Riley's Circus (1941)
- Old Mother Riley's Ghosts (1941)
- Old Mother Riley's Jungle Treasure (1951)
- Old Mother Riley's New Venture (1949)
- The Old Nest (1921)
- The Old New Year (1981)
- The Old Oak (2023)
- The Old Oak Blues (2000)
- An Old, Old Tale (1968)
- The Old Oregon Trail (1928)
- The Old People (2011)
- Old San Francisco (1927)
- Old School (2003)
- The Old School of Capitalism (2009)
- Old School New School (2011)
- The Old Scoundrel (1932)
- Old Shatterhand (1964)
- The Old Skinflint (1942)
- The Old Soak (1926)
- Old Soldiers Never Die (1931)
- The Old Song (1930)
- An Old Sweetheart of Mine (1923)
- The Old Swimmin' Hole: (1921 & 1940)
- The Old Testament (1962)
- The Old Texas Trail (1944)
- An Old-Time Nightmare (1911)
- The Old Wallop (1927)
- The Old Way (2023)
- Old Well (1987)
- The Old West (1952)
- The Old Wives' Tale (1921)
- The Old Wyoming Trail (1937)
- Old Yeller (1957)
- The Old and the Young King (1935)
- The Old Young People (1962)
- Oldboy: (2003 & 2013)
- Older than America (2008)
- Oldest Living Confederate Widow Tells All (1994 TV)
- The Oldest Profession (1967)

==== Ole–Oly ====
- Olé Olé Olé!: A Trip Across Latin America (2016)
- Ole Rex (1961)
- Oleanna (1994)
- Oleg (2019)
- Olesya (1971)
- Olga: (2004 & 2021)
- Olga, la hija de aquella princesa rusa (1972)
- Oli Vilakku (1968)
- Le olimpiadi dei mariti (1960)
- Olive (1988 TV)
- The Olive Harvest (2003)
- Olive Juice (2001)
- Olive Oyl for President (1948)
- The Olive Tree: (1975 TV & 2016)
- Oliver! (1968)
- Oliver and the Artful Dodger (1972)
- Oliver & Company (1988)
- Oliver the Eighth (1934)
- Oliver Twist: (1909, 1912 American, 1912 British, 1916, 1919, 1922, 1933, 1948, 1974, 1982 Australian, 1982 American-British, 1997 TV & 2005)
- Oliver Twist, Jr. (1921)
- Oliver's Story (1977)
- Olives and Their Oil (1914)
- Olivia: (1951 & 1983)
- Olivier, Olivier (1992)
- Ollie Hopnoodle's Haven of Bliss (1988)
- Olly Olly Oxen Free (1978)
- Olmo (2025)
- Oloibiri (2016)
- Olsen's Big Moment (1933)
- Los Olvidados (1950)
- Olympia: (1938, 1998 & 2011)
- Olympia 52 (1952)
- The Olympic Champ (1942)
- Olympic Dreams (2019)
- The Olympic Elk (1952)
- Olympic Games (1927)
- The Olympic Hero (1928)
- Olympic Honeymoon (1940)
- Olympics 40 (1980)
- Olympus Has Fallen (2013)
- Olympus Inferno (2008)

=== Om ===
- Om: (1995, 2003 & 2018)
- Om 3D (2013)
- Om Allah (2012)
- Om-Dar-B-Dar (1988)
- Om Jai Jagadish (2002)
- Om Namo Venkatesaya (2017)
- Om Shakti (1982)
- Om Shanthi Om (2015)
- Om Shanti (2010)
- Om Shanti Om (2007)

==== Oma–Omp ====
- Oma Irama Penasaran (1976)
- Omagh (2004)
- Omaha (2026)
- The Omaha Trail (1942)
- Omana (1972)
- Omanakkunju (1975)
- Omanakuttan (1964)
- Omar (2013)
- Omar Gatlato (1976)
- Omar Khaiyyam (1946)
- Omar Khayyam (1957)
- Omar Killed Me (2011)
- Omar & Salma (2007)
- Omar the Tentmaker (1922)
- Ombak Rindu (2011)
- Ombattane Dikku (2022)
- Ombre (1980)
- Ombre su Trieste (1952)
- Ombre sul Canal Grande (1951)
- Ombyte av tåg (1943)
- The Omega Code (1999)
- Omega Cop (1989)
- Omega Doom (1996)
- The Omega Man (1971)
- Omen (2003)
- The Omen series:
  - The Omen: (1976 & 2006)
  - Omen II (1978)
  - Omen III: The Final Conflict (1981)
  - Omen IV: The Awakening (1991 TV)
- Omer Dadi Aur Gharwale (2012)
- Omertà (2012)
- Omerta (2017)
- Omicidio all'italiana (2017)
- Omicidio per appuntamento (1966)
- Omicron (1963)
- The Omission (2018)
- Omkara: (2004 & 2006)
- Omkaram (1997)
- Omme Nishyabda Omme Yuddha (2019)
- Omniboat: A Fast Boat Fantasia (2020)
- Omnibus (1992)
- Omnipresent (2017)
- Omo Child: The River and the Bush (2015)
- Omo Elemosho (2012)
- Omo Ghetto (2020)
- Omo Ghetto: The Saga (2020)
- Omoi, Omoware, Furi, Furare (2020 live-action & 2020 anime)
- Omoo-Omoo, the Shark God (1949)
- Omphalos (2014)
- Ompong Galapong: May Ulo, Walang Tapon (1988)

=== On ===
- Ön (1966)
- On the 2nd Day of Christmas (1997 TV)
- On Again-Off Again (1937)
- On the Air (1934)
- On the Air Live with Captain Midnight (1979)
- On All Floors (2002)
- On Any Sunday (1971)
- On Any Sunday: Motocross, Malcolm, & More (2001)
- On Approval: (1930, 1944 & 1964)
- On aura tout vu (1976)
- On the Avenue (1937)
- On the Banks of Allan Water (1916)
- On the Banks of the River Weser (1927)
- On the Banks of the Wabash (1923)
- On the Basis of Sex (2018)
- On the Beach: (1959 & 2000 TV)
- On the Beach at Night Alone (2017)
- On the Beach by the Sea (1971)
- On the Beat: (1962 & 1995)
- On Beauty (2014)
- On the Black Hill (1987)
- On Board (1998)
- On Body and Soul (2017)
- On the Border (1930)
- On Borrowed Time (1939)
- On the Bowery (1956)
- On the Brink of Paradise (1920)
- On the Broad Stairway (1913)
- On Broadway (2006)
- On the Buses (1971)
- On Chesil Beach (2018)
- On a Clear Day (2005)
- On a Clear Day You Can See Forever (1970)
- On the Comet (1970)
- On the Corner (2003)
- On the Count of Three (2021)
- On the Count of Zero (2007)
- On with the Dance (1920)
- On Dangerous Ground: (1915, 1917 & 1952)
- On a Day of Ordinary Violence, My Friend Michel Seurat... (1996)
- On Deadly Ground (1994)
- On the Divide (1928)
- On the Doll (2010)
- On the Double (1961)
- On the Downlow (2004)
- On - drakon (2015)
- On Dress Parade (1939)
- On the Edge: (1986, 2001 & 2011)
- On the Edge of Innocence (1997)
- On the Far Side of the Tunnel (1994)
- On the Fiddle (1961)
- On the Fire (1919)
- On the Friendly Road (1936)
- On the Fringe (2022)
- On the Front Page (1926)
- On Golden Pond: (1981 & 2001 TV)
- On the Great White Trail (1938)
- On the Green Carpet (2001)
- On Guard (1997)
- On the Heights (1916)
- On Her Majesty's Secret Service (1969)
- On Her Shoulders (2018)
- On the High Seas (1922)
- On Hostile Ground (2000 TV)
- On Ice (1935)
- On the Ice (2011)
- On the Inside (2010)
- On an Island with You (1948)
- On the Isle of Samoa (1950)
- On the Job (2013)
- On the Job Training (2008)
- On the Jump (1918)
- On a Knife Edge (2017)
- On the Level: (1917 & 1930)
- On Line: (2002 & 2015)
- On the Line: (1984, 2001, 2007, 2011 & 2021)
- On the Loose: (1931, 1951, 1984 & 1985)
- On a Magical Night (2019)
- On the Milky Road (2016)
- On Moonlight Bay (1951)
- On the Mountain of Tai Hang (2005)
- On Murder Considered as One of the Fine Arts (1964)
- On My Own (1991)
- On My Skin: (2003 & 2018)
- On My Way (2013)
- On My Way to the Crusades, I Met a Girl Who... (1967)
- On My Way Out: The Secret Life of Nani and Popi (2017)
- On the Nameless Height (2003)
- On Native Soil (2006)
- On Next Sunday (2009)
- On the Nickel (1980)
- On the Night of the Fire (1939)
- On the Night Stage (1915)
- On the Nose (2001)
- On the Occasion of Remembering the Turning Gate (2002)
- On the Old Spanish Trail (1947)
- On the Other Hand, Death (2008)
- On the Other Side (2016)
- On the Other Side of the Tracks (2012)
- On Our Merry Way (1948)
- On Our Own Land (1948)
- On Our Selection: (1920 & 1932)
- On the Outs (2004)
- On the Path (2010)
- On the Point of Death (1971)
- On Probation: (1935, 1983 & 2005)
- On purge bébé (1931)
- On the Quiet (1918)
- On Record (1917)
- On the Red Cliff (1922)
- On the Red Front (1920)
- On the Reeperbahn at Half Past Midnight: (1929, 1954 & 1969)
- On the Right Track (1981)
- On the Riviera (1951)
- On the Road: (1936 & 2012)
- On the Road: A Document (1964)
- On the Road to Emmaus (2001)
- On the Rocks (2020)
- On the Roofs (1897)
- On the Run: (1958, 1982, 1988, 1999 & 2002)
- On se calme et on boit frais à Saint-Tropez (1987)
- On Secret Service (1933)
- On with the Show! (1929)
- On the Silver Globe (1988)
- On Stage Everybody (1945)
- On Such a Night: (1937 & 1955)
- On Suffocation (2013)
- On the Sunny Side: (1942 & 1962)
- On Swift Horses (2024)
- On Their Own (1940)
- On Thin Ice: (1925, 1933 & 1966)
- On a Tightrope (2017)
- On Time (1924)
- On Tiptoe: Gentle Steps to Freedom (2000)
- On Top (1982)
- On the Top of the Cherry Tree (1984)
- On Top of Old Smoky (1953)
- On Top of the Whale (1982)
- On Top of the World (1936)
- On Tour: (1990 & 2010)
- On the Town (1949)
- On the Trail of the Bremen Town Musicians (1973)
- On Trial: (1928 & 1939)
- On Valentine's Day (1986)
- On Velvet (1938)
- On War (2008)
- On the Waterfront (1954)
- On Wings of Fire (1986)
- On Wings of Love (1957)
- On the Wrong Trek (1936)
- On Your Back (1930)
- On Your Mark (2021)
- On Your Wedding Day (2018)
- On Ze Boulevard (1927)

==== Ona–Onc ====
- Onaaigal Jakkiradhai (2018)
- Onaayum Aattukkuttiyum (2013)
- Onan (2009)
- Onappudava (1978)
- Onbadhu Roobai Nottu (2007)
- Onbadhule Guru (2013)
- Once (2007)
- Once Aboard the Lugger (1920)
- Once Again (2012)
- Once Around (1991)
- Once Before I Die (1966)
- Once Bitten: (1932 & 1985)
- Once Brothers (2010)
- Once a Cop (1993)
- Once Fallen (2010)
- Once I Loved a Girl in Vienna (1931)
- Once I Was a Beehive (2015)
- Once I Will Return (1953)
- Once in the Life (2000)
- Once in a Lifetime: The Extraordinary Story of the New York Cosmos (2006)
- Once More: (1988 & 1997)
- Once Is Never (1955)
- Once Is Not Enough (1975)
- Once a Thief: (1935, 1950, 1965, 1991 & 1996 TV)
  - Once a Thief: Brother Against Brother (1997 TV)
  - Once a Thief: Family Business (1998 TV)
- Once Upon a Brothers Grimm (1977)
- Once Upon a Christmas (2000)
- Once Upon a Crime (1992)
- Once Upon a Dog (1982)
- Once Upon a Dream (1949)
- Once Upon a Forest (1993)
- Once Upon a Girl (1976)
- Once Upon a Halloween (2005)
- Once Upon a Honeymoon: (1942 & 1956)
- Once Upon a Line (2016)
- Once Upon a Mirage (1982)
- Once Upon a Mouse (1981)
- Once Upon a Scoundrel (1974)
- Once Upon a Texas Train (1988)
- Once Upon a Time: (1918, 1933, 1944, 1973, 1994, 2008, 2013 & 2017)
- Once Upon a Time in America (1984)
- Once Upon a Time in Amritsar (2016)
- Once Upon a Time in Anatolia (2011)
- Once Upon a Time in a Battlefield (2003)
- Once Upon a Time in Bihar (2015)
- Once Upon a Time in Bolivia (2012)
- Once Upon a Time in Brooklyn (2013)
- Once Upon a Time in China series:
  - Once Upon a Time in China (1991)
  - Once Upon a Time in China II (1992)
  - Once Upon a Time in China III (1993)
  - Once Upon a Time in China IV (1993)
  - Once Upon a Time in China V (1994)
  - Once Upon a Time in China and America (1997)
- Once Upon a Time, Cinema (1992)
- Once Upon a Time in the East: (1974 & 2011)
- Once Upon a Time in High School (2004)
- Once Upon a Time in Hollywood (2019)
- Once Upon a Time in Hong Kong: (2021 & 2023)
- Once Upon a Time in Kolkata (2014)
- Once Upon a Time in Manila (1994)
- Once Upon a Time in Mexico (2003)
- Once Upon a Time in the Midlands (2002)
- Once Upon a Time in Mumbaai (2010)
- Once Upon a Time in the Northeast (2017)
- Once Upon a Time in the Oued (2005)
- Once Upon a Time in Phuket (2012)
- Once Upon a Time in the Provinces (2008)
- Once Upon a Time in Queens (2013)
- Once Upon a Time in Rio (2008)
- Once Upon a Time in Seoul (2008)
- Once Upon a Time in Shanghai: (1998 & 2014)
- Once Upon a Time in Tibet (2010)
- Once Upon a Time in Triad Society (1996)
- Once Upon a Time in Venice (2017)
- Once Upon a Time in Vietnam (2013)
- Once Upon a Time Was I, Verônica (2012)
- Once Upon a Time in the West (1968)
- Once Upon a Time...When We Were Colored (1996)
- Once Upon a Time in the Woods (2006)
- Once Upon a Wheel (1971)
- Once Upon Another Time (2000)
- Once Upon ay Time in Mumbai Dobaara! (2013)
- Once Upon a Time There Was a Singing Blackbird (1970)
- Once Were Brothers: Robbie Robertson and the Band (2019)
- Once Were Warriors (1994)

==== Ond ====
- Ond Chance Kodi (2015)
- Ondagi Balu (1989)
- Ondagona Baa (2003)
- Ondalla Eradalla (2018)
- Ondanondu Kaladalli (1978)
- Onde (2005)
- Onde Balliya Hoogalu (1967)
- Onde Estás Felicidade? (1939)
- Onde Guri (1983)
- Onde Raktha (1985)
- Onde Roopa Eradu Guna (1975)
- Ondine (2010)
- Ondre Kulam (1956)
- Ondrupattal Undu Vazhvu (1960)
- Ondu Cinema Kathe (1992)
- Ondu Hennu Aaru Kannu (1980)
- Ondu Kshanadalli (2012)
- Ondu Motteya Kathe (2017)
- Ondu Muttina Kathe (1987)
- Ondu Premada Kathe (1977)

==== One ====
- One: (2009, 2013, & 2017)
- The One: (2001 & 2003)
- One 2 Ka 4 (2001)
- One Against All (1927)
- One A.M. (1916)
- One Angry Man (2010)
- One Arabian Night (1923)
- One Armed Boxer (1971)
- One Armed Swordsman Against Nine Killers (1976)
- One Away (1976)
- One Bad Knight (1938)
- One Battle After Another (2025)
- One Big Affair (1952)
- One Big Hapa Family (2010)
- One Big Holiday (2011)
- One Body Too Many (1994)
- One Breath: (2015 & 2020)
- One Brief Summer (1970)
- One Bright Shining Moment: The Forgotten Summer of George McGovern (2005)
- One Bullet Is Enough (1954)
- One Cab's Family (1952)
- One Can't Always Tell (1913)
- One Chance (2013)
- One Christmas (1994)
- One Clear Call (1922)
- One Colombo Night (1926)
- One Crazy Ride (2009)
- One Crazy Summer (1986)
- One Crowded Night (1940)
- One Cut of the Dead (2017)
- One Cut Two Cut (2022)
- One Dark Night (1983)
- One Day in Europe (2005)
- One Day in September (1999)
- One Deadly Summer (1983)
- One Direction: This Is Us (2013)
- One Dollar, The Price of Life (2002)
- One & Done (2016)
- One Down, Two to Go (1982)
- One and Eight (1983)
- One Eight Seven (1997)
- One False Move (1992)
- One Fine Day (1996)
- One Fine Morning (2022)
- One Fine Spring Day (2001)
- One Flew Over the Cuckoo's Nest (1975)
- One Foot in Heaven (1941)
- One Froggy Evening (1955)
- One Good Cop (1991)
- One Good Turn: (1931, 1936, 1951 & 1955)
- One from the Heart (1982)
- One Heavenly Night (1931)
- One Hour Photo (2002)
- One Hour in Wonderland (1950 TV)
- One Hour with You (1932)
- One Hundred Men and a Girl (1937)
- One Hundred and One Dalmatians (1961)
- One Hundred Years of Evil (2010)
- One Last Dance: (2003 & 2006)
- One Last Thing... (2006)
- One Leg Kicking (2001)
- One Little Indian (1973)
- The One I Love (2014)
- One Magic Christmas (1985)
- One Man Band (2005)
- One Man and His Cow (2016)
- The One-Man Band (1900)
- One Mile (2026)
- One Million B.C. (1940)
- One Million Years B.C. (1966)
- One Minute to Nine (2007)
- One Missed Call: (2003 & 2008)
- One for the Money (2012)
- One More Chance (2023)
- One More River (1934)
- One More Shot: (2024 & 2025)
- One More Time: (1931, 1970 & 2015)
- One More Tomorrow (1946)
- One More Train to Rob (1971)
- One Night Husband (2003)
- One Night with the King (2006)
- One Night of Love (1934)
- One Night at McCool's (2001)
- One Night Only: (2008, 2016 & 2026)
- One Night Stand: (1984, 1997 & 2016)
- One Night Stud (2015)
- One Night in Miami... (2020)
- One Night in the Tropics (1940)
- One Night with You: (1932 & 1948)
- The One and Only (1978, 1999 & 2002)
- The One and Only, Genuine, Original Family Band (1968)
- The One and Only Ivan (2020)
- One of Our Aircraft Is Missing (1942)
- One of Our Dinosaurs is Missing (1975)
- One Perfect Day: (2004 & 2013)
- One Piece films:
  - One Piece: The Movie (2000)
  - One Piece The Movie: Clockwork Island Adventure (2001)
  - One Piece The Movie: Chopper's Kingdom on the Island of Strange Animals (2002)
  - One Piece The Movie: Dead End no Bōken (2003)
  - One Piece: The Cursed Holy Sword (2004)
  - One Piece Movie: The Desert Princess and the Pirates: Adventures in Alabasta (2007)
  - One Piece Film: Strong World (2009)
  - One Piece Film: Z (2012)
  - One Piece Film Gold (2016)
  - One Piece: Stampede (2019)
- One Potato, Two Potato (1964)
- One for the Road: (2003, 2009, 2014 & 2021)
- One Russian Summer (1973)
- One Second (2020)
- One Shot (2005)
- One Song a Day Takes Mischief Away (1970)
- One Spoon of Chocolate (2026)
- One Step Away (2014)
- One of Them Days (2025)
- One Touch of Venus (1948)
- One True Thing (1998)
- One & Two (2015)
- One Way (2006)
- One Way Street (1950)
- One Way Ticket: (1935, 1988, 1997 TV, & 2008)
- One Week: (1920 & 2008)
- One Week and a Day (2016)
- One Week Friends (2017)
- One Wonderful Sunday (1947)
- One, Two, Three (1961)
- One: The Movie (2005)
- One-Armed Swordsman (1967)
- One-Eyed Jacks (1961)
- One-Eyed Monster (2008)
- One-Trick Pony (1980)
- One-Way Ticket to Mombasa (2002)
- OneChanbara (2008)
- Onegin (2000)
- The Ones Below (2015)

==== Ong–Onl ====
- Ong-Bak series:
  - Ong-Bak: Muay Thai Warrior (2003)
  - Ong Bak 2 (2008)
  - Ong Bak 3 (2010)
- Ongka's Big Moka (1974)
- Ongole Gittha (2013)
- Oni Ise Owo (2007)
- Onibaba (1964)
- Onibi (1997)
- Onibi Kago (1957)
- Onimasa (1982)
- The Onion Field (1980)
- Onion From the Boot of a Benz (2015)
- The Onion Movie (2008)
- Onionhead (1958)
- Onkel Bill fra New York (1959)
- Onks' Viljoo näkyny? (1988)
- Only 38 (1923)
- Only Angels Have Wings (1939)
- Only the Animals (2019)
- Only the Brave: (1930, 1994, 2006 & 2017)
- Only Clouds Move the Stars (1998)
- Only Fools Rush In (2022)
- The Only Game in Town (1970)
- The Only Girl (1933)
- Only God Forgives (2013)
- Only God Knows (2006)
- The Only Good Indian (2009)
- Only Human: (2004 & 2010)
- The Only Living Boy in New York (2017)
- The Only Living Pickpocket in New York (2026)
- Only the Lonely (1991)
- Only Lovers Left Alive (2013)
- Only with Married Men (1974 TV)
- The Only One: (1952 & 2006)
- Only One Night: (1922, 1939 & 1950)
- Only People (1957)
- The Only Road (1918)
- Only Saps Work (1930)
- The Only Son: (1914, 1936 & 2016)
- Only the Strong (1993)
- The Only Thing (1925)
- The Only Thing You Know (1971)
- The Only Thrill (1997)
- Only Two Can Play (1962)
- Only the Valiant: (1940 & 1951)
- The Only Way: (1927, 1970 & 2004)
- Only When I Larf (1968)
- Only When I Laugh (1981)
- The Only Witness (1990)
- The Only Woman (1924)
- Only Yesterday: (1933 & 1991)
- Only You: (1992, 1994, 2011, & 2015)

==== Onm–Ony ====
- Onmyoji (2004)
- Onmyōji 2 (2003)
- Onna no Ana (2014)
- Onna Babo (2002)
- Onna Gokuakuchō (1970)
- Onna no Hosomichi: Nureta Kaikyo (1980)
- Onna Irukka Kathukanum (1992)
- Onna Keirin-ō (1956)
- Onna no Koyomi (1954)
- Onna Tachiguishi-Retsuden (2006)
- Onnaam Muhurtham (1991)
- Onnam Prathi Olivil (1985)
- Onnaman (2002)
- Onnanam Kunnil Oradi Kunnil (1985)
- Onnanu Nammal (1984)
- Onninu Purake Mattonnu (1988)
- Onnelliset leikit (1964)
- Onningu Vannengil (1985)
- Onnu Chirikku (1983)
- Onnu Muthal Poojyam Vare (1986)
- Onnu Randu Moonnu (1986)
- Onnum Mindatha Bharya (1984)
- Onnum Mindathe (2014)
- Onnum Onnum Moonu (2015)
- Onoda: 10,000 Nights in the Jungle (2021)
- Ononto Prem (1977)
- Onsdagsväninnan (1946)
- Onslaught (2026)
- Ontari (2008)
- Ontari Poratam (1989)
- Onti (2019)
- Onti Salaga (1989)
- Ontmaskerd (1915)
- Ontrouw (1911)
- Onward (2020)
- Onward Christian Soldiers (1918)
- Onye Ozi (2013)

=== Oo ===
- Oo Na, Mahal Na Kung Mahal (1999)

==== Ood–Ooz ====
- Oodi Oodi Uzhaikanum (2020)
- The Oogieloves in the Big Balloon Adventure (2012)
- Ooh... diese Ferien (1958)
- Ooh La La La (2012)
- Ooh... You Are Awful (1972)
- Ooha (1996)
- Oohakachavadam (1988)
- Oohalu Gusagusalade (2014)
- Oolkatal (1979)
- Oollo Pelliki Kukkala Hadavidi (2018)
- Oomai Vizhigal (1986)
- Oomakkuyil (1983)
- Oomakkuyil Padumbol (2012)
- Oomana Thinkal (1983)
- Oomappenninu Uriyadappayyan (2002)
- Oonch Neech Beech (1989)
- Oonche Log: (1965 & 1985)
- Oonga (2013)
- Oonjaal (1977)
- Ooops! Noah is Gone... (2015)
- Ooparwala Jaane (1977)
- Oops! (2003)
- Oor Mariyadhai (1992)
- Oorantha Sankranthi (1983)
- Oorige Upakari (1982)
- Oorkavalan (1987)
- Oorlog en vrede (1918)
- Oormakale Vida Tharu (1980)
- Ooru Vittu Ooru Vanthu (1990)
- Ooruki Monagadu (1981)
- Oorukichchina Maata (1981)
- Oorukku Oru Pillai (1982)
- Oorukku Uzhaippavan (1976)
- Ooruku Nooruper (2003)
- Oorum Uravum (1982)
- Oorummadi Brathukulu (1976)
- Oos Raat Ke Baad (1969)
- Oosaravelli (2011)
- Oothikachiya Ponnu (1981)
- Oottyppattanam (1982)
- Ooty (1999)
- Ooty Varai Uravu (1967)
- Ooyala (1998)
- Oozham (2016)

=== Op ===
- Op een Avond in Mei (1937)
- Op Hoop van Xegen: (1918, 1924 & 1934)
- Op Stap (1935)
- Op stap door Amsterdam (1919)

==== Opa–Ope ====
- Opa! (2005)
- Opal Dream (2006)
- Opasniye Povoroty (1962)
- Open: (2011 & 2019)
- Open All Night: (1924 & 1934)
- Open City (2008)
- Open Doors (1990)
- The Open Doors (2004)
- Open Fire: (1989 & 1994)
- Open Grave (2013)
- Open Heart (2012)
- An Open Heart (2012)
- Open Hearts (2002)
- Open House (1987, 2004 & 2010)
- The Open House (2018)
- Open Range: (1927 & 2003)
- Open Season (1974)
- Open Season series:
  - Open Season (2006)
  - Open Season 2 (2008)
  - Open Season 3 (2010)
  - Open Season: Scared Silly (2015)
- An Open Secret (2014)
- Open Water (2003)
- Open Water 2: Adrift (2006)
- Open Windows (2014)
- Open Your Eyes: (1919 & 1997)
- Open Your Window (1953)
- Opened by Mistake (1940)
- Opening Day of Close-Up (1996)
- Opening of the Kiel Canal (1895)
- The Opening of Misty Beethoven (1965)
- Opening Night: (1977 & 2016)
- Opera (1987)
- Opera Ball: (1939 & 1956)
- Opera House (1961)
- Opera Jawa (2006)
- Operacja Himmler (1979)
- Operation Agneepath (TBD)
- Operation Alamelamma (2017)
- Operation Amsterdam (1959)
- Operation Antha (1995)
- Operation Arapaima (TBD)
- Operation Atlantis (1965)
- Operation Autumn (2012)
- Operation Avalanche (2016)
- Operation Bikini (1963)
- Operation Bottleneck (1961)
- Operation Bullshine (1959)
- Operation Chromite (2016)
- Operation C.I.A. (1965)
- Operation Concrete (1955)
- Operation Counterspy (1965)
- Operation Crossbow (1965)
- Operation Cupid (1960)
- Operation Dames (1959)
- Operation Daybreak (1975)
- Operation Delilah (1967)
- Operation Delta Force series:
  - Operation Delta Force (1997 TV)
  - Operation Delta Force 2: Mayday (1997 TV)
  - Operation Delta Force 3: Clear Target (1999)
  - Operation Delta Force 4: Deep Fault (1999)
  - Operation Delta Force 5: Random Fire (2000)
- Operation Diamond Racket (1978)
- Operation Diplomat (1953)
- Operation Duryodhana (2007)
- Operation Duryodhana 2 (2013)
- Operation Dumbo Drop (1995)
- Operation E (2012)
- Operation Edelweiss (1954)
- Operation Eichmann (1961)
- Operation Finale (2018)
- Operation Fortune: Ruse de guerre (2022)
- Operation Gold Fish (2019)
- Operation Gold Ingot (1962)
- Operation Hadal (2025)
- Operation Happy New Year (1996)
- Operation Haylift (1950)
- Operation Homecoming: Writing the Wartime Experience (2007)
- Operation Jackpot Nalli C.I.D 999 (1969)
- Operation Leopard (1980)
- Operation Mad Ball (1957)
- Operation Malaya (1953)
- Operation Manhunt (1954)
- Operation Mata Hari (1968)
- Operation Mekong (2016)
- Operation Mincemeat (2021)
- Operation Mitra (1951)
- Operation Murder (1957)
- Operation Nam (1986)
- Operation Pacific (1951)
- Operation Petticoat (1959)
- Operation Poker (1965)
- Operation Red Sea (2018)
- Operation Secret (1952)
- Operation Shmenti Capelli (2011)
- Operation Snatch (1962)
- Operation St. Peter's (1967)
- Operation Stadium (1977)
- Operation Stogie (1959)
- Operation Swallow: The Battle for Heavy Water (1948)
- Operation Taco Gary's (2026)
- Operation Teutonic Sword (1958)
- Operation Thunderbolt (1977)
- Operation Valkyrie: The Stauffenberg Plot to Kill Hitler (2008)
- Operation Vittles (1948)
- Operation Warzone (1988)
- Operation Y and Shurik's Other Adventures (1965)
- Operation: Endgame (2012)
- Operation: Rabbit (1952)
- Operator (2015 & 2016)
- The Operator (2000)

==== Opf–Opu ====
- Opfergang (1944)
- Ophelia: (1963 & 2018)
- Opie Gets Laid (2005)
- Opium: (1919 & 1949)
- Opium: Diary of a Madwoman (2007)
- Opium and the Kung-Fu Master (1984)
- Opium War (2008)
- The Opium War (1997)
- Oppai Volleyball (2009)
- Oppam (2016)
- Oppam Oppathinoppam (1986)
- Oppanda (2022)
- Oppenheimer (2023)
- Oppol (1981)
- The Opponent: (1988 & 2000)
- The Opportunists (1960)
- Opportunity (1918)
- Opportunity Knocks (1990)
- Opposite Day (2009)
- The Opposite Sex: (1956 & 2014)
- The Opposite Sex and How to Live with Them (1993)
- The Opposite of Sex (1998)
- Opposites Attract (1990 TV)
- Oprah Winfrey Presents: Mitch Albom's For One More Day (2007)
- The Opry House (1929)
- Optical Illusions (2009)
- An Optimistic Tragedy (1963)
- The Optimists (2006)
- The Optimists of Nine Elms (1974)
- Opus (2025)
- Opus IV (1925)
- Opus Zero (2017)

=== Or ===
- Or Iravu (1951)
- Or (My Treasure) (2004)

==== Ora–Orc ====
- Ora (2011)
- Ora Charjon (1988)
- Ora Egaro Jon (1972)
- Ora Pro Nobis (1917)
- Ora Thake Odhare (1954)
- Oraalppokkam (2014)
- The Oracle (1953)
- Orage (1938)
- Oral Koodi Kallanayi (1964)
- Oral Mathram (1997)
- Oram Po (2007)
- Orang Ikan (2024)
- Orange: (2010, 2012, 2015 & 2018)
- Orange Blossom (1932)
- Orange County (2002)
- Orange Mittai (2015)
- Orange Revolution (2007)
- The Orange Sky (2006)
- Orange Valley (2018)
- Orange Winter (2007)
- The Oranges (2011)
- Oranges and Sunshine (2010)
- Oranje Hein: (1925 & 1936)
- Orayiram Kinakkalal (2018)
- Orbis Pictus (1997)
- Orca (1977)
- The Orchard End Murder (1980)
- Orchestra Wives (1942)
- Orchids and Ermine (1927)
- Orchids, My Intersex Adventure (2010)
- Orchids and My Love (1966)
- Orchids to You (1935)

==== Ord–Org ====
- The Ordeal (2005)
- Ordeal in the Arctic (1993 TV)
- Ordeal by Innocence (1984)
- The Ordeal of Rosetta (1918)
- The Order: (2001, 2003 & 2024)
- The Order of the Black Eagle (1987)
- The Order of Myths (2008)
- Order Order Out of Order (2019)
- Orders Are Orders (1955)
- Orders Is Orders (1933)
- Orders to Kill (1958)
- Ordet (1955)
- Ordinary (2012)
- Ordinary Guys (2017)
- Ordinary Decent Criminal (2000)
- Ordinary Heroes: (1986 TV & 1999)
- Ordinary Love (2019)
- An Ordinary Love Story (2012)
- Ordinary Magic (1993)
- An Ordinary Man (2017)
- An Ordinary Miracle: (1964 & 1978)
- Ordinary People: (1980 & 2009)
- The Ordinary Radicals (2008)
- Ordinary World (2016)
- Ore 10: lezione di canto (1955)
- Ore Kadal (2007)
- Ore Mukham (2016)
- Ore Oru Gramathiley (1989)
- Ore Raththam (1987)
- Ore Thooval Pakshikal (1988)
- Ore Vaanam Ore Bhoomi (1979)
- Oregon Passage (1957)
- Oregon Trail (1945)
- The Oregon Trail: (1936 & 1959)
- Oregon Trail Scouts (1947)
- The Oregonian (2011)
- Les Oreilles (2008)
- Oresama (2004)
- Organ (1996)
- The Organization (1971)
- Organized Crime & Triad Bureau (1994)
- The Organizer (1963)
- Orgasm Inc. (2009)
- Orgasmic Birth: The Best-Kept Secret (2008)
- Orgasmo (1969)
- Orgazmo (1997)
- Orgy of the Dead (1965)

==== Ori ====
- Oriana (1985)
- Oridathoru Phayalvaan (1981)
- Oridathoru Postman (2010)
- Oridathoru Puzhayundu (2008)
- Oridathu (1987)
- Orient: (1924 & 1928)
- Orient Express: (1927, 1934, 1943, 1944, 1954 & 2004)
- Orient Fever (1923)
- Oriental Nights (1960)
- Oriental Port (1950)
- Orientation: A Scientology Information Film (1996)
- Oriented (2015)
- The Origin of Evil (2022)
- Origin: Spirits of the Past (2006)
- Original (2009)
- Original Gangstas (1996)
- The Original Kings of Comedy (2000)
- Original Sin: (1992 & 2001)
- The Original Sin (1948)
- The Originals (2017)
- Orikkal Koodi (1981)
- Orikkal Oridathu (1985)
- Orion (2015)
- Orion's Belt (1985)
- Orissa (2013)
- Oriundi (2000)
- Oriyan Thoonda Oriyagapuji (2015)
- Oriyardori Asal (2011)
- Orizuru Osen (1935)

==== Ork–Orr ====
- Orkkappurathu (1988)
- Orkkuka Vallappozhum: (1978 & 2009)
- Orlando (1992)
- Orlean (2015)
- Orma Mathram (2011)
- Ormakal Marikkumo (1977)
- Ormakalundayirikkanam (1995)
- Ormakkayi (1982)
- Ormayil Nee Maathram (1979)
- Ormayundo Ee Mukham (2014)
- Ormen (1966)
- Ornette: Made in America (1985)
- Oro (2016)
- Oro Diablo (2000)
- Oro, Plata, Mata (1982)
- Oro rojo (1978)
- Oro Viliyum Kathorthu (1998)
- Orochi (1925)
- Orochi, the Eight-Headed Dragon (1994)
- Orosia (1944)
- Orozco the Embalmer (2001)
- Orphan (2016)
- Orphan series:
  - Orphan (2009)
  - Orphan: First Kill (2022)
  - Orphans (TBD)
- The Orphan (1960)
- The Orphan of Anyang (2001)
- Orphan of the Ghetto (1954)
- Orphan of Lowood (1926)
- Orphan of the Pecos (1937)
- Orphan of the Sage (1928)
- Orphan Train (1979 TV)
- Orphan of the Wilderness (1936)
- Orphan's Benefit (1934)
- An Orphan's Tragedy (1955)
- The Orphanage: (2007 & 2019)
- The Orphanage of Iran (2016)
- Orphans (1987 & 1998)
- Orphans of Apollo (2008)
- Orphans of the Genocide (2014)
- Orphans of Happiness (1922)
- Orphans of the Storm (1922)
- Orphans of the Street (1938)
- Orpheus (1949)
- Orpheus Descending (1990)
- Orquesta Típica (2005)
- Orr Eravuu (2010)

==== Oru–Orw ====
- Oru Abhibhashakante Case Diary (1995)
- Oru Adaar Love (2019)
- Oru Black and White Kudumbam (2009)
- Oru CBI Diary Kurippu (1988)
- Oru Cheru Punchiri (2000)
- Oru Cinemakkaran (2017)
- Oru Indhiya Kanavu (1983)
- Oru Indian Pranayakadha (2013)
- Oru Iyakkunarin Kadhal Diary (2017)
- Oru Kadankatha Pole (1993)
- Oru Kaidhiyin Diary (1985)
- Oru Kal Oru Kannadi (2012)
- Oru Kalluriyin Kathai (2005)
- Oru Kanniyum Moonu Kalavaanikalum (2014)
- Oru Katha Oru Nunakkatha (1986)
- Oru Kidayin Karunai Manu (2017)
- Oru Kochu Bhoomikulukkam (1992)
- Oru Kochu Swapnam (1984)
- Oru Kochukatha Aarum Parayatha Katha (1984)
- Oru Kudakeezhil (1985)
- Oru Kudumba Chithram (2012)
- Oru Kuppai Kathai (2018)
- Oru Kuprasidha Payyan (2018)
- Oru Kuttanadan Blog (2018)
- Oru Madapravinte Katha (1983)
- Oru Malarin Payanam (1985)
- Oru Maravathoor Kanavu (1998)
- Oru Marubhoomikkadha (2011)
- Oru Maymasa Pulariyil (1987)
- Oru Mexican Aparatha (2017)
- Oru Minnaminunginte Nurunguvettam (1987)
- Oru Modhal Oru Kadhal (2014)
- Oru Mugathirai (2017)
- Oru Mukham Pala Mukham (1983)
- Oru Murai Vanthu Parthaya (2016)
- Oru Mutham Manimutham (1997)
- Oru Muthassi Gadha (2016)
- Oru Muthassi Katha (1991)
- Oru Naal Innoru Naal (1985)
- Oru Naal Iravil (2015)
- Oru Naal Koothu (2016)
- Oru Naal Oru Kanavu (2006)
- Oru Naal Varum (2010)
- Oru Nadigai Natakam Parkiral (1978)
- Oru Nadigaiyin Vaakkumoolam (2012)
- Oru Nalla Naal Paathu Solren (2018)
- Oru Nokku Kanan (1985)
- Oru Odai Nadhiyagirathu (1983)
- Oru Oodhappu Kan Simittugiradhu (1976)
- Oru Oorla (2014)
- Oru Oorla Oru Rajakumari (1995)
- Oru Oorla Rendu Raja (2014)
- Oru Painkilikatha (1984)
- Oru Pakka Kathai (2020)
- Oru Pazhaya Bomb Kadha (2018)
- Oru Penninte Katha (1971)
- Oru Pennum Randaanum (2008)
- Oru Poi (2016)
- Oru Ponnu Oru Paiyan (2007)
- Oru Raagam Pala Thaalam (1979)
- Oru Sandesam Koodi (1985)
- Oru Sayahnathinte Swapnam (1989)
- Oru Second Class Yathra (2015)
- Oru Sindoora Pottinte Ormaykku (1987)
- Oru Small Family (2010)
- Oru Sumangaliyude Katha (1984)
- Oru Sundariyude Katha (1972)
- Oru Swakaryam (1983)
- Oru Thaai Makkal (1971)
- Oru Thalai Ragam (1980)
- Oru Thayin Sabhatham (1987)
- Oru Thira Pinneyum Thira (1982)
- Oru Vadakkan Selfie (2015)
- Oru Vadakkan Veeragatha (1989)
- Oru Varsham Oru Maasam (1980)
- Oru Vasantha Geetham (1994)
- Oru Veedu Oru Ulagam (1978)
- Oru Velladu Vengaiyagiradhu (1980)
- Oru Vidukadhai Oru Thodarkadhai (1979)
- Oru Vilippadakale (1982)
- Oru Viral (1965)
- Oru Visheshapetta Biriyani Kissa (2017)
- Oru Yaathrayude Anthyam (1991)
- Oru Yamandan Premakadha (2019)
- Oru Yathramozhi (1997)
- Oru Yathrayil (2013)
- Oru Yugasandhya (1986)
- Orukkam (1990)
- Orun Mooru (1982)
- Oruththi (2003)
- Oruvar Vaazhum Aalayam (1988)
- Orwell Rolls in His Grave (2003)

=== Os ===
- Os Dias Com Ele (2013)
- Os Famosos e os Duendes da Morte (2009)
- Os Faroleiros (1920)
- Os Homens São de Marte... E é pra Lá que Eu Vou! (2014)
- Os Maias (2014)
- Os Olhos da Ásia (1996)
- Os Trapalhões series:
  - Os Trapalhões e o Mágico de Oróz (1984)
  - Os Trapalhões e o Rei do Futebol (1986)
  - Os Trapalhões na Guerra dos Planetas (1978)
  - Os Trapalhões no Reino da Fantasia (1985)
- Os Verdes Anos (1963)
- Osa kryvei i nychta (1964)
- Osadeni Dushi (1975)
- Osai (1984)
- Osaka Elegy (1936)
- Osaka Story (1999)
- An Osaka Story (1957)
- Osaka Tough Guys (1995)
- Osama (2003)
- The Oscar (1966)
- Oscar: (1967 & 1991)
- Oscar and Lucinda (1997)
- Oscar and the Lady in Pink (2009)
- Oscar Shaw (2026)
- Oscar Wilde (1960)
- Oscuro Animal (2016)
- Oscuros Rinocerontes Enjaulados (1990)
- Osean: (1990 & 2003)
- Osiris (2025)
- Oslo, August 31st (2011)
- The Oslo Diaries (2018)
- Osmosis Jones (2001)
- Un Oso Rojo (2002)
- Osru Diye Lekha (1972)
- Ossessione (1943)
- Ossos (1997)
- The Osterman Weekend (1983)
- Ostia (1970)
- Osuofia in London (2003)

=== Ot ===
- Otaku Unite! (2004)
- Otan leipei i gata (1962)
- Otello: (1906 & 1986)
- Otesánek (2000)
- Othello: (1922, 1951, 1956, 1965 Australian, 1965 British, 1980, 1990, 1995, 2001 & 2017)
- The Other: (1913, 1930, 1972 & 1999)
- The Other Boleyn Girl: (2003 TV & 2008)
- The Other End of the Line (2008)
- The Other F Word (2011)
- The Other Final (2003)
- The Other Guys (2010)
- The Other Half: (1919, 2006 & 2016)
- The Other Half of the Sky: A China Memoir (1975)
- The Other Hell (1981)
- The Other Kind of Love (1924)
- The Other Lamb (2019)
- The Other Love (1947)
- The Other Lover (1985)
- The Other Man: (1916 & 2008)
- Other Men's Shoes (1920)
- Other Men's Wives (1919)
- Other Men's Women (1931)
- Other Mommy (2026)
- The Other One (2008)
- The Other One: The Long Strange Trip of Bob Weir (2015)
- Other People (2016)
- The Other People (1968)
- Other People's Children (1958)
- Other People's Relatives (1956)
- Other People's Money (1991)
- Other People's Sins (1931)
- The Other Shoe (2001)
- The Other Side: (1931, 2006, 2012 & 2015)
- The Other Side of AIDS (2004)
- The Other Side of the Bed (2002)
- The Other Side of Heaven (2001)
- The Other Side of Heaven 2: Fire of Faith (2019)
- The Other Side of Hope (2017)
- The Other Side of Midnight (1977)
- The Other Side of the Mirror (2007)
- The Other Side of the Mountain (1975)
- The Other Side of the Mountain Part 2 (1978)
- The Other Side of Paradise (1953)
- The Other Side of Sunday (1996)
- The Other Side of the Underneath (1972)
- The Other Side of the Wind (2018)
- The Other Sister (1999)
- Other Voices: (1970 & 2000)
- The Other Woman: (1921, 1924, 1931, 1954, 1983 TV, 1995 TV, 2009 & 2014)
- Other Women's Husbands (1926)
- Otherhood (2019)
- The Others: (1974 & 2001)
- Otis (2008)
- Otley (1968)
- Otogirisō (2001)
- Otoko no Isshō (2014)
- Otomo (1999)
- Otōto (2010)
- Ott Tänak: The Movie (2019)
- Otta Nanayam (2005)
- Ottaal (2015)
- Ottakkayyan (2007)
- Ottamuri Velicham (2017)
- Ottayadipathakal (1993)
- Ottayal Pattalam (1991)
- An Otter Study (1912)
- Otto – Der Film (1985)
- The Ottoman Lieutenant (2017)

=== Ou ===
==== Oua–Oui ====
- Ouaga-Saga (2004)
- Oui (1996)
- Ouija: (2003, 2007, 2014 & 2015)
- Ouija: Origin of Evil (2016)
- Ouija 4 (2015)
- Ouija House (2018)

==== Our ====
- Our Agent Tiger (1965)
- Our Barrio (2016)
- Our Beautiful Days (1955)
- Our Beloved (2018)
- Our Beloved Month of August (2008)
- Our Better Selves (1919)
- Our Betters (1933)
- Our Blood Will Not Forgive (1964)
- Our Blushing Brides (1930)
- Our Body (2018)
- Our Boy (1936)
- Our Brand Is Crisis: (2005 & 2015)
- Our Children (2012)
- Our Country (2006)
- Our Country Cousin (1914)
- Our Crazy Aunts (1961)
- Our Crazy Aunts in the South Seas (1964)
- Our Crazy Nieces (1963)
- Our Curse (2013)
- Our Daily Bread: (1929, 1934, 1949 & 2005)
- Our Dancing Daughters (1928)
- Our Daughter (1981)
- Our Day (1938)
- Our Day Out (1977, TV)
- Our Day Will Come (2010)
- Our Diary (2017)
- Our Disappeared (2008)
- Our Doctor is the Best (1969)
- Our Earthmen Friends (2006)
- Our Emden (1926)
- Our Enemy — The Japanese (1943)
- Our Everyday Life (2015)
- Our Family (2014)
- Our Family Wedding (2010)
- Our Father: (1953, 2015 & 2016)
- Our Fathers (2005, TV)
- Our Feature Presentation (2008)
- Our Fighting Navy (1937)
- Our Forbidden Places (2008)
- Our Fragrance (2003)
- Our Friend (2019)
- Our Friend Tili (1981)
- Our Friend, Martin (1999)
- Our Friends, the Hayseeds (1917)
- Our Futures (2015)
- Our Gang (1922)
- Our Gang Follies of 1936 (1935)
- Our Gang Follies of 1938 (1937)
- Our Generation (2010)
- Our Girl Friday (1953)
- Our Grand Despair (2011)
- Our Happy Lives (1999)
- Our Hearts Were Growing Up (1946)
- Our Hearts Were Young and Gay (1944)
- Our Heavenly Bodies (1925)
- Our Hero, Balthazar (2026)
- Our Homeland (2012)
- Our Hospitality (1923)
- Our House: (2006 TV & 2018)
- Our House in Cameroon (1961)
- Our Huff and Puff Journey (2014)
- Our Huge Adventure (2005, direct-to-video)
- Our Idiot Brother (2011)
- Our Italian Husband (2004)
- Our Kind of Traitor (2016)
- Our Lady of the Assassins (2000)
- Our Lady of Sorrows (1934)
- Our Land (2006)
- Our Leading Citizen: (1922 & 1939)
- Our Lips Are Sealed (2000)
- Our Little Sister (2015)
- Our Love (2000)
- Our Man Flint (1966)
- Our Man in Havana (1960)
- Our Man in Tehran (2013)
- Our Men in Bagdad (1966)
- Our Miss Brooks (1956)
- Our Mother's House (1967)
- Our Relations (1936)
- Our School (2009)
- Our Shining Days (2017)
- Our Son, the Matchmaker (1996, TV)
- Our Song (2000)
- Our Sons (1991, TV)
- Our Souls at Night (2017)
- Our Story (1984)
- Our Time: (1974 & 2018)
- Our Times (2015)
- Our Town: (1940, 2003 & 2007)
- Our Twisted Hero (1992)
- Our Very Own: (1950 & 2005)
- Our Wife: (1931 & 1941)
- Ouran High School Host Club (2012)
- Ourselves Alone (1936)

==== Out–Ouw ====
- Out: (1957, 1982, 2002 & 2017)
- Out 1 (1971)
- Out of Africa (1985)
- Out All Night: (1927 & 1933)
- Out of the Blue: (1931, 1947, 1980, 2002 & 2006)
- Out of the Blue: Live at Wembley (1980)
- Out California Way (1946)
- Out Cold: (1989 & 2001)
- Out of Control: (1985, 2002, 2003 & 2017)
- Out of the Darkness: (1971 & 1985)
- Out of Death (2021)
- Out of the Furnace (2013)
- Out for Justice (1991)
- Out for a Kill (2003)
- Out of My Intention (2008)
- Out of Order: (1987 & 1997)
- Out of the Past (1947)
- Out of Reach (2004)
- Out to Sea (1997)
- Out of Sight (1998)
- Out of Time: (1988 & 2003)
- Out West: (1918 & 1947)
- Out of the Wilderness (2001 TV)
- The Out-Laws (2023)
- The Out-of-Towners: (1970 & 1999)
- Outback Revenge (2012)
- Outback Vampires (1987)
- Outbreak (1995)
- Outcast: (1917, 1922, 1928, 1937, 2010 & 2014)
- The Outcast: (1934 & 1954)
- An Outcast Among Outcasts (1912)
- The Outcasts: (1982, 2007 & 2017)
- Outerlands (2025)
- The Outfield (2015)
- The Outfit: (1973 & 2022)
- Outfoxed: Rupert Murdoch's War on Journalism (2004)
- The Outing (1987)
- Outkast (2001)
- Outland (1981)
- Outlander (2008)
- Outlaw: (1999 & 2007)
- The Outlaw: (1939, 1943 & 2010)
- The Outlaw Josey Wales (1976)
- Outlaw King (2018)
- Outlaw Posse (2024)
- Outlaws and Angels (2016)
- The Outlaws Is Coming (1965)
- Outpost: (1944, 1959 & 2008)
- Outpost: Black Sun (2012)
- Outpost: Rise of the Spetsnaz (2013)
- The Outpost: (1995 & 2020)
- Outrage: (1950, 1973 TV, 1998 TV, 2009 & 2010)
- The Outrage: (1964 & 2011)
- Outrageous! (1977)
- Outside (2004)
- Outside the Law: (1920, 1930, 1937, 1956, 2002 & 2010)
- The Outside Man (1972)
- Outside Providence (1999)
- Outside the Wall (1950)
- Outside the Wire (2021)
- Outsider: (1997 & 2012)
- The Outsider: (1917, 1926, 1931, 1939, 1948, 1961, 1980, 1981, 1998 TV, 2002, 2005, 2014, 2018, 2019 & 2021)
- The Outsiders (1983)
- Outsourced (2006)
- The Outwaters (2022)
- Ouw Peh Tjoa (1934)

=== Ov ===
- Over 21 (1945)
- Over the Border: (1922, 1950 & 2006)
- Over the Brooklyn Bridge (1984)
- Over the Dark Water (1992)
- Over Drive (2018)
- Over the Edge (1979)
- Over-Exposed (1956)
- Over the Fence: (1917, 2009, & 2016)
- Over the Garden Wall: (1919, 1934 & 1950)
- Over the Goal (1937)
- Over the Hedge (2006)
- Over Her Dead Body (2008)
- Over the Hill: (1917, 1931 & 1992)
- The Over the Hill Band (2009)
- Over the Hill to the Poorhouse (1920)
- The Over-the-Hill Gang (1969 TV)
- The Over-the-Hill Gang Rides Again (1970 TV)
- An Over-Incubated Baby (1901)
- Over the Moon: (1939 & 2020)
- Over My Dead Body: (1942, 1995, 2012 Canadian & 2012 South Korean)
- Over the Odds (1961)
- Over da Rainbow (2008)
- Over the Rainbow (2002)
- Over the River...Life of Lydia Maria Child, Abolitionist for Freedom (2007)
- Over Run Over (2016)
- Over the Santa Fe Trail (1947)
- Over She Goes (1937)
- Over stork og stein (1994)
- Over There (1917)
- Over Tissa (1958)
- Over the Top: (1918 & 1987)
- Over the Wall (1938)
- Over the Waves (1950)
- Over Your Cities Grass Will Grow (2010)
- Over Your Dead Body: (2014 & 2026)
- Overboard: (1987 & 2018)
- The Overbrook Brothers (2009)
- The Overcoat: (1926, 1952, 1959 & unfinished)
- Overcomer (2019)
- Overdrawn at the Memory Bank (1983 TV)
- Overdrive: (1997 & 2017)
- The Overeater (2003)
- Overexposed (1990)
- Overheard series:
  - Overheard (2009)
  - Overheard 2 (2011)
  - Overheard 3 (2014)
- Overhill (2013)
- Overland Adventure (1954)
- Overland to Deadwood (1942)
- Overland with Kit Carson (1939)
- The Overland Limited (1925)
- Overland Mail (1942)
- Overland Mail Robbery (1943)
- Overland Pacific (1954)
- Overland Red (1920)
- Overland Riders (1946)
- The Overland Stage (1927)
- Overland Stage Raiders (1938)
- Overland Stagecoach (1942)
- Overland Telegraph (1951)
- The Overland Telegraph (1929)
- Overland Trails (1948)
- The Overlanders (1946)
- Overlord: (1975 & 2018)
- Overman (2015)
- Overnight: (1985 & 2003)
- The Overnight (2015)
- Overnight Delivery (1998)
- Overnight Sensation (1932)
- The Overnighters (2014)
- Overpass (2015)
- Override (1994)
- An Oversimplification of Her Beauty (2012)
- The Overtaxed (1959)
- Overture: (1958 & 1965)
- The Overture (2004)
- Overture to The Merry Wives of Windsor (1953)
- Overvallers in de Dierentuin (1984)
- Ovunque sei (2004)
- Ovy's Voice (2017)

=== Ow–Oz ===
- Owd Bob: (1924, 1938 & 1998)
- Owl (2003)
- The Owl: (1927 & 1991)
- The Owl vs Bombo (1984)
- The Owl and the Pussycat (1970)
- Owl and the Sparrow (2007)
- The Owl Who Married a Goose: An Eskimo Legend (1974)
- The Owner (2012)
- Owners (2019)
- The Owners (2014)
- The Owners (2020)
- Owning Mahowny (2003)
- Owzat (1997)
- The Ox (1991)
- The Ox-Bow Incident (1943)
- The Oxbow Cure (2013)
- Oxford Blues (1984)
- The Oxford and Cambridge University Boat Race (1895)
- Oxford Gardens (2015)
- The Oxford Murders (2008)
- Oxhide (2005)
- Oxyana (2013)
- Oxygen: (1999, 2009, 2010, 2017, 2020 & 2021)
- Oy! (2009)
- Oy Vey! My Son Is Gay!! (2009)
- Oy! (2009)
- Oye Ninne (2017)
- Oye Hoye Pyar Ho Gaya (2013)
- Oye Kuch Kar Guzar (2016)
- Oye Lucky! Lucky Oye! (2008)
- Oyee (2016)
- The Oyster Dredger (1915)
- Oyster Farmer (2004)
- The Oyster Princess (1919)
- Oyster Village (1972)
- Oysters at Nam Kee's (2002)
- Oz (1976)
- Oz the Great and Powerful (2013)
- An Ozark Romance (1918)
- Ozark Sharks (2016 TV)
- Ozhivudivasathe Kali (2015)
- Ozhivukaalam (1985)
- OzLand (2014)
- Ozzy (2016)

Previous: List of films: M Next: List of films: P

== See also ==
- Lists of films
- Lists of actors
- List of film and television directors
- List of documentary films
- List of film production companies
