= Ouija (disambiguation) =

The Ouija is a flat board purportedly used to communicate with spirits.

Ouija or Ouija Board may also refer to:

== Film ==
- Ouija (2003 film), a 2003 Spanish horror film
- Ouija (2007 film), a 2007 Philippine horror film
- Ouija (2014 film), a 2014 American horror film
  - Ouija: Origin of Evil, a 2016 American horror
- Ouija (2015 film), a 2015 Indian horror film
- Ouija 4, a 2015 Hong Kong horror film

== Horse racing ==
- Ouija Board (horse) (2001–2022), British Thoroughbred racehorse
- Ouija Board Handicap, an American Thoroughbred horse race

== Music ==
- Ouija pop a musical genre created by Bambie Thug
- "Ouija Board, Ouija Board", a 1989 song by Morrissey

== Other uses ==
- Ouija board, a scale model of an aircraft carrier's flight and hangar decks used in modern United States Navy carrier air operations

== See also ==
- Ouida (1839–1908), English novelist
- Weegee (1899–1968), American photojournalist
