= Ouija: Origin of Evil =

2016 film by Mike Flanagan

- Theatrical release poster
- Directed by: Mike Flanagan
- Written by: Mike Flanagan; Jeff Howard
- Based on: Ouija by Hasbro; Characters by Juliet Snowden Stiles White
- Produced by: Michael Bay; Jason Blum; Stephen Davis; Andrew Form; Bradley Fuller; Brian Goldner
- Starring: Elizabeth Reaser; Lulu Wilson; Annalise Basso; Henry Thomas
- Cinematography: Michael Fimognari
- Edited by: Mike Flanagan
- Music by: The Newton Brothers
- Production companies: Universal Pictures; Platinum Dunes; Blumhouse Productions; Allspark Pictures
- Distributed by: Universal Pictures
- Release date: October 21, 2016 (United States)
- Running time: 99 minutes
- Country: United States
- Language: English
- Budget: $9–12 million
- Box office: $81.7 million

Ouija: Origin of Evil is a 2016 American supernatural horror film directed, and edited by Mike Flanagan, who co-wrote the script with Jeff Howard. The film is a prequel to the 2014 film Ouija, and stars Elizabeth Reaser, Lulu Wilson, Annalise Basso, and Henry Thomas. It follows a widow and her family who introduce a Ouija board into their phony seance business, thereby inviting a spirit that possesses the youngest daughter.

Ouija: Origin of Evil was released in the United States on October 21, 2016, by Universal Pictures. The film grossed $81.7 million worldwide and received positive reviews from critics, with many praising it as a significant improvement over its predecessor. Lin Shaye was the only cast member to have returned from the first film, appearing in a post-credit cameo.

== Plot ==
In 1967 Los Angeles, a widow named Alice Zander works out of her suburban home as a fake spiritual medium, accompanied by her daughters, 15-year-old Paulina "Lina" and 9-year-old Doris. The family is reeling over the recent death of Roger, Alice's husband and the children's father. Alice incorporates a Ouija board into her readings and unknowingly contacts a spirit named Marcus that begins to possess Doris.

After Alice receives notice of foreclosure on their home, Doris contacts the board for help, believing she is communicating with her dead father. The spirit leads Doris to a secret compartment in the basement wall containing a pouch of cash. When she gives her mother the money, the family has a Ouija session. When the board answers a question only Roger would know the answer to, a thrilled Alice begins believing that they are in contact with him.

Soon, Doris becomes fully possessed by the spirit and throws tantrums when told she must go to school, since she wants to stay home with the Ouija board. Lina, disturbed by the changes in her sister, finds papers written by Doris in fluent Polish, a language she does not know, and brings them to Father Tom Hogan, her school principal. Troubled, Father Tom visits them for a Ouija session under the pretense of contacting his dead wife, Gloria. He later explains to them that Doris did not contact Gloria. Instead, for every question he asked, she read his thoughts and repeated the answers he was thinking in his mind. (Note: For instance, Father Tom asks the spirit what Gloria's middle name was, and he mentally concentrates on "Lynn," his mother's middle name. The Ouija board answers "Lynn," instead of Gloria's middle name, Catherine.) The pages are entries written by a Polish immigrant named Marcus, who was taken captive during World War II by a sadistic Nazi doctor who conducted experiments on him and other captives in the house's basement. These spirits have been watching the family since the day they moved in. When asked what the spirits want from them, Doris replies, "Voice."

Doris kills Lina's new boyfriend, Mikey, when he comes to visit. Father Tom, Alice, and Lina burn the Ouija board in the basement furnace (shortly afterward, they find it untouched on its table upstairs). Beside the furnace, Father Tom finds the secret room where the experiments were conducted, and is possessed by the spirits, only to be killed later by Doris. Alice is captured, while Roger's spirit carries an unconscious Lina to her bed. Recalling earlier when her doll's mouth was stitched shut by her father's spirit "to shut out the voices" for Doris, Lina realizes she must sew Doris' mouth shut to quiet the spirits' voices. She sews Doris' mouth shut, but kills Doris in the process.

Doris wakes up as a ghost and is happily reunited with her father. The spirits possess Lina, who stabs Alice, who tells Lina with her dying breaths that it was not Lina's fault, leaving Lina devastated and orphaned. Lina is admitted into a mental hospital for the murder of her mother and disappearance of her sister. Alone in her room, she creates a Ouija board on the floor with her own blood and tries to summon Doris, but summons an evil spirit in Doris' form instead.

In a post-credits scene, 46 years later, a now elderly and still institutionalized Lina receives a visit from someone claiming to be her niece, greeting them with a wide smile.

== Cast ==
- Elizabeth Reaser as Alice Zander
- Annalise Basso as Paulina "Lina" Zander
  - Lin Shaye as older Paulina "Lina" Zander
- Lulu Wilson as Doris Zander
- Henry Thomas as Father Thomas "Tom" Hogan
- Parker Mack as Michael "Mikey" Russell
- Kate Siegel as Jenny Browning
- Doug Jones as Ghoul Marcus
- Halle Charlton as Ellie
- Alexis G. Zall as Betty
- Sam Anderson as Mr. Browning
- Ele Keats as Ellie's Mom
- Nicholas Keenan as Walter
- Michael Weaver as Roger Zander
- Umran Mustafa as Keith Hemmingway

== Production ==
Although the first film in the Ouija series was a success commercially, it was not well-received by critics. As a result, Jason Blum wanted to make a film that was significantly different from the original. This appealed to director Mike Flanagan who stated in an interview that he has an "allergy to sequels". Blum let Flanagan work on the type of horror film he wanted which was a period piece that dealt with a family dynamic. There was some talk from the beginning about whether or not the film should have any connections at all to the original, but Flanagan himself was opposed to this, and instead opted to make subtle references to the original to welcome new viewers while also entertaining fans of the original.

Regarding it as an influence, Flanagan screened the 1980 film The Changeling for his director of photography "like ten times". Flanagan also watched such horror classics as The Exorcist and The Watcher in the Woods. It was then that the pair hit off the idea to film the movie as if it were made during the 1970s, using only technology that would only have been available at the time.

Production in Los Angeles commenced in September 2015 and wrapped in October 2015. The main cast was announced in September 2015 with principal photography beginning that same month, which ran to October 21, 2015. Post-production on the film began on October 31, 2015.

Universal Pictures used its 1963–1990 logo, designed by Universal Title and Optical for MCA Inc., to open and promote the film.

=== Soundtrack ===
The Newton Brothers (replacing Anton Sanko, who composed the first film) composed the prequel. The soundtrack was released by Back Lot Music on October 21, 2016.

== Release ==
In April 2015, it was announced that the film would be released on October 21, 2016.

=== Box office ===
Ouija: Origin of Evil grossed $35.1 million in North America and $46.6 million in other territories for a worldwide total of $81.7 million, against a budget of $12 million.

The film opened alongside Boo! A Madea Halloween, Keeping Up with the Joneses, Jack Reacher: Never Go Back, and I'm Not Ashamed, and was expected to gross around $15 million from about 3,168 theaters in its opening weekend. It ended up grossing $14.1 million (compared to its predecessor's $19.9 debut), finishing third at the box office.

=== Critical response ===
On the review aggregator website Rotten Tomatoes, 83% of 126 critics' reviews are positive, with an average rating of 6.5/10. The website's consensus reads: "Ouija: Origin of Evil swerves its franchise's planchette unexpectedly to YES with a surprisingly scary and dramatically satisfying follow-up to its lackluster predecessor." It was one of the highest-rated films to date produced by either Hasbro Studios or Platinum Dunes. Metacritic, which uses a weighted average, assigned the film a score of 65 out of 100, based on 26 critics, indicating "generally favorable" reviews. Audiences polled by CinemaScore gave the film an average grade of "C" on an A+ to F scale, the same as its predecessor.

Katie Rife for The A.V. Club gave the film a B and wrote that compared to its predecessor "It is better, though, in every conceivable way, from casting to story to atmosphere." Odie Henderson for RogerEbert.com gave the film three stars and called it "one overstuffed horror movie recipe, with a dash of The Exorcist and a spritz of Ghost among its tasty ingredients." Adam Dileo of IGN said "Ouija: Origin of Evil may just be the latest entrant into that small category of sequels and prequels that manage to improve upon their predecessors in every way." Kate Erbland of IndieWire called the film "genuinely frightening and smart, the rare horror prequel able to stand on its own merits and deliver a full-bodied story that succeeds without any previous knowledge or trappings."

Jimmy Champagne of Bloody Disgusting called it "easily Flanagan's best film yet" and said "Ouija: Origin of Evil is a heartfelt and genuinely frightening experience."

== Unofficial sequels ==
In 2015 and 2016 respectively, two unofficial sequels to Ouija and Ouija: Origin of Evil were released, titled Ouija 3: The Charlie Charlie Challenge and Ouija 4. The former was made in the United States while the latter was made in Hong Kong and advertised in the United States as such.
