= Rabbit Hole (2010 film) =

2010 film directed by John Cameron Mitchell

- Theatrical release poster
- Directed by: John Cameron Mitchell
- Screenplay by: David Lindsay-Abaire
- Based on: Rabbit Hole by David Lindsay-Abaire
- Produced by: Gigi Pritzker; Nicole Kidman; Per Saari; Leslie Urdang; Dean Vanech
- Starring: Nicole Kidman; Aaron Eckhart; Dianne Wiest; Tammy Blanchard; Miles Teller; Giancarlo Esposito; Jon Tenney; Sandra Oh
- Cinematography: Frankie DeMarco
- Edited by: Joe Klotz
- Music by: Anton Sanko
- Production companies: Olympus Pictures; Blossom Films; OddLot Entertainment
- Distributed by: Lionsgate
- Release dates: September 13, 2010 (TIFF); December 17, 2010 (United States)
- Running time: 91 minutes
- Country: United States
- Language: English
- Budget: $3 million
- Box office: $6.2 million

Rabbit Hole is a 2010 American drama film directed by John Cameron Mitchell and adapted by David Lindsay-Abaire from his 2006 play. The film stars Nicole Kidman (who also co-produced) and Aaron Eckhart as a grieving couple coping with the death of their four-year-old son. It also stars Dianne Wiest, Tammy Blanchard, Giancarlo Esposito, Jon Tenney, Sandra Oh and Miles Teller in his film debut.

Rabbit Hole had its world premiere at the 35th Toronto International Film Festival on September 13, 2010. The film received a limited theatrical release in the United States on December 17, 2010, before a wide release on January 28, 2011, by Lionsgate Films. Kidman's performance was critically acclaimed; she was nominated for the Academy Award for Best Actress, the Critics' Choice Movie Award for Best Actress, the Golden Globe Award for Best Actress in a Motion Picture – Drama and the Screen Actors Guild Award for Outstanding Performance by a Female Actor in a Leading Role.

== Plot ==
Rebecca "Becca" and Howard "Howie" Corbett's four-year-old son Danny is killed in a car accident when he runs out into the street after his dog. Eight months on, Becca wants to give away Danny's clothes, remove Danny's things, and sell their house. Howie is angry at Becca's elimination of anything that reminds them of their child. Howie wants to have another child, but Becca doesn't.

Becca's mother, Nat, has also lost a son, Arthur (Becca's brother), who died of a drug overdose when he was 30. Becca states the two deaths are different situations, and thus not comparable. Becca's sister Izzy is pregnant, and Becca keeps giving Izzy passive-aggressive advice about becoming a mother, which Izzy resents.

Becca and Howie attend group therapy, where Becca is irritated by some of the other members – particularly by one couple who attribute their own child's death to "God's will". Becca stops going to therapy, while Howie continues to attend the meetings without Becca. Meanwhile, long-time member Gabby starts coming to group alone, telling Howie that her husband also refuses to come to group therapy, but later she admits that he left her. One night, he sees her high in her car, and asks to join her. They both start smoking pot in her car before the group therapy meetings. Eventually, they ditch meetings in favor of going to do things like bowling, where they almost begin an affair. However, Howie pulls away, stating that he is in love with his wife.

Meanwhile, Becca starts meeting with Jason, the teenage driver of the car that hit Danny. She discovers he feels guilty and tells him she does not blame him for the accident. Jason tells her about a comic book he is writing called Rabbit Hole, which is about parallel universes. She asks to see it, and he tells her that she can see it when he is finished.

Becca tries to cope with her grief in non group therapy ways, first with getting her garden back into shape, but her intruding neighbor arrives, and later damages a new annual. She later when Howie is at work, takes the train into downtown New York City, and visits her old workplace, Sotheby's auction. She is flummoxed when the receptionist treats her like a sales person, until a former coworkers recognizes her.

"Good to see you're still doing the coffee runs," Becca says, to this younger coworker.

"Oh, not normally, I'm in Scott's old job. Hey, how's the family?"

Unable to find understanding from her coworkers about her loss, Becca leaves the workplace abruptly. She almost collides with a revolving door on her way out.

A birthday party for her sister offers some light hearted family time, until the mother starts talking about the untimely death of Kennedy Jr, and this leads to another Segway into the death of Danny, Arthur.

Becca and Howie put their house on the market. The day of the open house, Howie decides to stay at the home for it. During the open house, he is in Danny's bedroom with an interested couple, who ask about his son. He tells them that his son died and they react awkwardly. Becca spends the open house on various girl bonding outings, with her sister, and a key scene in the grocery store, has Becca scolding a mother for not offering a treat for her young son. After words are exchanged, Becca slaps the mother.

"Go to the car, Becca," says the sister, to an emotional Becca.

Becca and the sister return to the house, to find Howie discouraged without a prospective buyer. The dog barks, and Jason enters, thinking he would find Becca to bring her his now finished comic book.

Howie, is stunned, and asks Jason why he is in his house. A meltdown ensues, and Jason drops the comic book with Becca, and leaves.

Becca and Jason meet again, and talk about the content of the comic book – parallel lives. She realizes that at this moment, she is living her "sad" self. There are many other versions of her that exist in other ways, and are not consumed by grief. Howie and Becca begin to have new activities, such as bowling and playing games, and they start to accept their son's death. Becca also comes to realize that her grief is like her mother's, in that it will never end.

Howie and Becca decide to have a garden lunch. The scene begins with Howie telling Becca how the lunch would take place, subtly and incrementally interacting with a small group of trusted friends while life begins to feel normal again. Simultaneously, the screen fades into the lunch as Howie continues to speak in the background. The film ends with Becca and Howie sitting in their garden alone, after all their guests have left, staring into space. Becca reaches out to Howie and touches his hand. They hold hands affectionately as they continue to sit and stare into space.

== Cast ==
- Nicole Kidman as Rebecca "Becca" Corbett
- Aaron Eckhart as Howard "Howie" Corbett
- Dianne Wiest as Nat
- Miles Teller as Jason
- Tammy Blanchard as Izzy
- Sandra Oh as Gabby
- Giancarlo Esposito as Auggie
- Jon Tenney as Rick
- Stephen Mailer as Kevin
- Mike Doyle as Craig
- Roberta Wallach as Rhonda
- Patricia Kalember as Peg
- Ali Marsh as Donna
- Yetta Gottesman as Ana
- Colin Mitchell as Sam
- Deidre Goodwin as Reema
- Julie Lauren as Debbie
- Rob Campbell as Bob

== Production ==
Rabbit Hole was filmed primarily in the Douglaston neighborhood of the borough of Queens, New York City. The $3.2 million production had a 28-day shoot.

Due to a scheduling conflict, Kidman declined a role in Woody Allen's You Will Meet a Tall Dark Stranger in favor of this film. In a 2014 interview on The Howard Stern Show, Eckhart said that he researched his role by pretending in a support group to have lost a child.

Owen Pallett was initially scheduled to compose the score, but then Abel Korzeniowski was announced. Ultimately, the position went to Anton Sanko.

== Release ==
Rabbit Hole premiered at the 2010 Toronto International Film Festival in September 2010, then played at three other film festivals (Mill Valley Film Festival in October, and both Denver Film Festival, and Rome Film Festival in November). The film opened in Canada and the United States on December 17, 2010, in a limited release in 5 theaters and grossed $53,778 averaging $10,756 per theater and ranking 38th at the box office. The widest release domestically for the film was 131 theaters and it ended up earning $2,229,058 in the U.S. and $2,914,096 internationally for a total of $5,143,154.

== Reception ==
Rabbit Hole received positive reviews and has a rating of 86% on Rotten Tomatoes based on 198 reviews with an average score of 7.60/10. The consensus states: "It's often painful to watch, but Rabbit Hole's finely written script and convincing performances make it worth the effort." The film also has a score of 76 out of 100 on Metacritic based on 39 reviews.

Festival and other advance showings of the film garnered good reviews, particularly for Kidman and Wiest. The film received a standing ovation at the 2010 Toronto International Film Festival. Kirk Honeycutt of The Hollywood Reporter said: "Kidman grabs the central focus of the story as the more distraught of the two. The performance is riveting because she essentially plays the entire film at two levels, the surface everyday life and then what is turning over and over again in her mind." Peter Debruge of Variety found it "a refreshingly positive-minded take on cinema's ultimate downer: overcoming the death of a child", and called it "[a]droitly expanded" from the stage play, "with Nicole Kidman and Aaron Eckhart delivering expert, understated performances". Roger Ebert gave it 3.5 stars out of four, calling it "... entertaining and surprisingly amusing, under the circumstances. The film is in a better state of mind than its characters. Its humor comes, as the best humor does, from an acute observation of human nature. We have known people something like this. We smile in recognition. Apart from anything else, Rabbit Hole is a technical challenge. It is simple enough to cover the events in the story, not so simple to modulate them for humor and even warmth. I knew what the movie would be about, but I was impressed by how it was about it."

Richard Corliss of Time named it one of the Top 10 Movies of 2010.

== Differences from the play ==
The play has a cast of five roles, while a few other characters such as Gabby are only mentioned in dialogue. In contrast, the film has a cast of over a dozen actors. While the entire play takes place in the home of Becca and Howie, the film has a variety of locations. Past incidents, such as Becca's bad experience in the grief support group, are referred to in the play's dialogue but are depicted on screen in the film. The videos that Howie obsesses over are actually seen in the film, though not in the play. The two subplots of Howie's relationship with a woman from the grief support group and Becca's relationship with Jason, the driver of the car that hit Danny, have both been expanded. The film also adds new characters who do not appear in the play: sister Izzy's boyfriend and Howie's best friend.

Jason is an aspiring science fiction writer in the play, but an aspiring comic book artist in the film.

In the play, Becca's brother Arthur commits suicide by hanging. In the movie, Arthur dies of a heroin overdose.

In the opinion of critic Jim Lane, the film is more focused on the husband and wife and less of an ensemble piece. Lane writes

On stage, Rabbit Hole is a tightly focused five-character drama punctuated with sharp, surprising flashes of aching humor. In the movie, however, supporting roles are trimmed into near irrelevance, elbowed into the background by the spotlight focused on Becca and Howie—or, more bluntly, on Nicole Kidman and Aaron Eckhart. Here’s what David Lindsay-Abaire seems not to understand about his own play: It’s like an atom in which the five characters are electrons revolving around the missing nucleus that was Danny.... Without their nucleus, these electrons wobble and flail in their orbits, by turns clutching at and repelling one another.... In the movie, Rabbit Hole's symmetrical stage design is torn between the age-old pitfall of “opening up” a play and the Hollywood urge to focus on Kidman and Eckhart (who are, after all, the stars).....The movie orbits Becca and Howie instead of the lost Danny.

The director of a 2010 stage production of Rabbit Hole, Robert A. Norman, declared: "The 2010 movie version starring Nicole Kidman lacked the humor and hopefulness of the stage script. Our production will have plenty of both of those things." However, Abaire, who wrote both the stage play and screenplay, believes: "For the film, we cut so much that worked in the play that I worried we had cut all the laughs. But there were all these other laughs I didn't know were there."

== Accolades ==
Award / Film Festival	Date of ceremony	Category	Recipient(s)	Result	Ref.
Academy Awards	February 27, 2011	Best Actress	Nicole Kidman	Nominated	
Alliance of Women Film Journalists	January 10, 2011	Best Actress	Nicole Kidman	Nominated	
Alliance of Women Film Journalists	January 10, 2011	Best Adapted Screenplay	David Lindsay-Abaire	Nominated	
Chicago Film Critics Association	December 20, 2010	Best Adapted Screenplay	David Lindsay-Abaire	Nominated	
Critics' Choice Movie Awards	January 14, 2011	Best Actress	Nicole Kidman	Nominated	
Dallas–Fort Worth Film Critics Association	December 17, 2010	Best Actress	Nicole Kidman	3rd place	
Denver Film Festival	November 14, 2010	Excellence in Acting Awards	Aaron Eckhart	Won	
Detroit Film Critics Society	December 16, 2010	Best Actress	Nicole Kidman	Nominated	
Golden Globe Awards	January 16, 2011	Best Actress in a Motion Picture – Drama	Nicole Kidman	Nominated	
Heartland Film Festival	2010	Truly Moving Picture Award	Rabbit Hole	Won	
Houston Film Critics Society	December 18, 2010	Best Actress	Nicole Kidman	Nominated	
Independent Spirit Awards	February 26, 2011	Best Director	John Cameron Mitchell	Nominated	
Independent Spirit Awards	February 26, 2011	Best Female Lead	Nicole Kidman	Nominated	
Independent Spirit Awards	February 26, 2011	Best Male Lead	Aaron Eckhart	Nominated	
Independent Spirit Awards	February 26, 2011	Best Screenplay	David Lindsay-Abaire	Nominated	
Online Film Critics Society	January 3, 2011	Best Actress	Nicole Kidman	Nominated	
San Diego Film Critics Society	December 14, 2010	Best Actor	Aaron Eckhart	Nominated	
Satellite Awards	December 19, 2010	Best Actress – Motion Picture	Nicole Kidman	Nominated	
Satellite Awards	December 19, 2010	Best Supporting Actress – Motion Picture	Dianne Wiest	Nominated	
Screen Actors Guild Awards	January 30, 2011	Outstanding Performance by a Female Actor in a Leading Role	Nicole Kidman	Nominated	
St. Louis Film Critics Association	December 20, 2010	Best Actress	Nicole Kidman	Nominated	
Washington D.C. Area Film Critics Association	December 6, 2010	Best Actress	Nicole Kidman	Nominated	

== See also ==
- Rabbit Hole (soundtrack)
- Rabbit Hole (play)
- Dream House
- Talaash
