= Rabbit Hole (soundtrack) =

Rabbit Hole (Original Motion Picture Soundtrack)

Film score by Anton Sanko
- Released: December 14, 2010
- Recorded: 2010
- Genre: Film score
- Length: 22:00
- Label: Lionsgate Records
- Producer: Anton Sanko

Anton Sanko chronology
Handsome Harry (2010)	Rabbit Hole (2010)	The Possession (2012)

Rabbit Hole (Original Motion Picture Soundtrack) is the film score to the 2010 film Rabbit Hole directed by John Cameron Mitchell starring Nicole Kidman and Aaron Eckhart. The original score is composed by Anton Sanko and released through Lionsgate Records on December 14, 2010.

== Development ==
In January 2010, it was reported that musician-cum-multi-instrumentalist Owen Pallett would write the score for Rabbit Hole. However, Pallett declined on working on the film, despite completing much of the score written for three months. He described that he had to tour for his band and as the producers had not locked the picture, which might lead to his dates overlap with the film's post-production. Pallett described the working process in Hollywood being difficult as he had to satisfy every member from the production and music team, and the producers had brought him only during the post-production time, which was also one of his concerns on leaving the project.

Later, that March, Abel Korzeniowski was announced to write the film score. But, by that July, composer Anton Sanko was announced to replace Korzeniowski. Sanko considered Rabbit Hole as one of his important scores, as he worked on several horror films, this film being a drama was much different from his other ventures. He also considered it much difficult owing to the challenges to match David Lindsay-Abaire's original play on which the film is based on, where he did not want the melancholy to overdo the film's plot. With each aspect of the film being incredibly well done, he wanted the music to follow the same route.

== Release ==
Lionsgate Records released the film's soundtrack on December 14, 2010, three days prior to the film's release.

== Reception ==
Nadine Whitney of The Curb considered the score as "melancholic". Ella Taylor of NPR wrote "Anton Sanko's minimalist score sustains the tact". Peter Debruge of Variety wrote "Anton Sanko’s Arvo Part-esque score, all introspective pianos and strings, encourages us to feel without forcing a reaction". Bill Graham of Collider wrote "Another small touch that is utilized brilliantly is the music by Anton Sanko and how it can disappear in the middle of intense scenes. A quiet moment in the park is accented by chirping birds and breezes. Additionally, after a few explosive scenes there is a notable lack of score, emphasizing the ups and downs of the journey. All of these tiny details are what round out the experience of Rabbit Hole, and while based on a play, the film never feels like anything less than a well-funded drama." CBC News wrote "Composer Anton Sanko, who used to play with Suzanne Vega, provides a poignant score filled with delicately plucked guitar."

== Track listing ==
No.	Title	Length
1.	"Cleaning"	1:28
2.	"World Lines"	0:59
3.	"Opening Titles"	2:01
4.	"The Accident"	4:29
5.	"Drawing"	0:32
6.	"Toys"	0:33
7.	"Tire Swing"	1:25
8.	"Sotheby's"	1:08
9.	"Open House"	1:49
10.	"Walk in the Park"	0:43
11.	"Walking the Dog"	1:52
12.	"The Cookout"	1:43
13.	"Driving Home"	0:46
14.	"Goodwill"	1:57
15.	"An Uncomfortable Silence"	0:35
Total length:		22:00
