= Ana Coto =

American actress

- Born: October 17, 1990 (age 35); San Juan, Puerto Rico
- Occupation: Actress
- Years active: 2010–present

Ana Cristina Coto (born October 17, 1990) is an American actress, best known for playing the lead role of Sarah Morris in the film Ouija.

== Life and career ==
Coto was born in Puerto Rico, to Cuban parents. She later moved to Miami with her parents, and was raised there.

In 2014, Coto played the lead role of Sarah Morris in the supernatural horror film Ouija along with Olivia Cooke. Stiles White directed the film, which released on October 24, 2014, by Universal Pictures.

In 2015, Coto appeared as a guest in the comedy television series Comedy Bang! Bang! as Kelly Mulligan.

Coto plays the titular role in the upcoming dramatic short film, "The Sleeping Life Of Sofia." In the film, Coto plays Sofia Morales, a lonely painter who sleeps to escape her depression.

=== TikTok ===
As of April 2021, Coto has 2.1 million followers on the short video sharing platform TikTok. In late April 2020, she gained fame on the platform for a viral video of her roller skating to the song "Jenny from the Block" by Jennifer Lopez. The video is credited for reviving the hobby of roller skating, as TikTok users made use of empty parking lots and streets left by the decreased traffic of the COVID-19 pandemic to join the trend.

== Filmography ==
=== Film ===
Year	Title	Role	Notes
2010	Reality of Tomorrow	—N/a	Short film
2011	Viral	—N/a	Short film
2011	DisCONNECTED	Lisa	
2014	Ouija	Sarah Morris	
2015	Actress	Abby Reed	Short film
2015	Finlay Rogers and the Toxic Megacolon	Meyers	Short film
2017	His Lover	Linda Joyce	Short film
2017	Can't Take It Back	Kristen Shaw	
2018	Blue Lips	Kit	Short film
2019	Don't Let Me Be Your Nobody	Birthday Girl	Short film
2019	Wingmen	Jane	Short film
2020	The Sleeping Life Of Sofia	Sofia Morales	Short Film

=== Television ===
Year	Title	Role	Notes
2015	Comedy Bang! Bang!	Kelly Mulligan	Episode: "Simon Helberg Wears a Sky Blue Button Down Jeans"
2016	True Fiction	Susan	Unaired television series
