= Da Boom Crew =

Canadian-American animated television series

- Genre: Action; Science fiction; Comedy
- Created by: Bruce W. Smith; John Patrick White; Stiles White
- Starring: Jordan Francis; Jascha Washington; Melanie Tonello; Mitchell Eisner; Walter Borden; Jamie Watson
- Countries of origin: Canada; Germany; United States
- Original language: English
- No. of episodes: 13 (9 aired only in UK)

Production
- Executive producers: Bruce W. Smith; Rainer Sohnlein; Willard Carroll; Tom Wilhite
- Producer: Michael Hefferon
- Running time: 22 minutes
- Production companies: Berliner Film Companie; Jambalaya Studios

Original release
- Network: The WB (episodes 1-4); Cartoon Network UK (episodes 5-13)
- Release: September 11 – October 2, 2004

Da Boom Crew is an animated television series created by Bruce W. Smith, John Patrick White, and Stiles White. The series premiered on The WB as part of the Kids' WB! schedule in September 2004. Unusual for an animated series, it was pulled from the Kids' WB! line-up after only four out of thirteen episodes had aired.

== Plot ==
Four foster kids create a video game about heroes going up against space alien terrorists. Then a portal appears and pulls them into a dimension which is just like the world in their game. They embark on a quest to find their missing video game cartridges and stop the sadistic extraterrestrial emperor Zorch from taking control of this intergalactic dimension.

== Characters ==
- Justin – The leader and general of the crew who wears shoulder pads, and elbow pads. His weapons are two laser pistols and an arm slingshot. Voiced by Jordan Francis.
- Nate – The gang's ship pilot, Justin's younger brother, and his right hand man. The shortest and youngest in the group, he has short brown hair and wears a light blue top and blue jeans. He refers to himself as 'big daddy Nate' and has a fear of heights. His arsenal is a laser sword given to him as a reward by the yo-diggians for helping save commander Blurp. Voiced by Jascha Washington.
- Jubei – A hoverboard rider. He's Justin's friend who wears a visor cap armed with a laser shotgun, and is an accurate sharp shooter. However, when he misses a shot, he calls it the "kiki popo". He is apparently of Japanese descent. Voiced by Mitchell Eisner.
- Ricki – A whiz kid gadget creator, making her the gang's genius. She is a ginger-haired girl who wears a red track jacket with matching jogging pants, grey hiking boots, a blue wristband on her left wrist, and has ginger hair up positioned in two pigtails. She is an expert with anything mechanical, uses a vast scientific knowledge when describing things, attacks using a metal staff, has a fear of water, and even romantic feelings for her superior Justin. Voiced by Melanie Tonello.
- Dent – A sentient robot which has been given to Ricki as a gift after she helped save commander Blurp. He resembles a flat screen computer with a hollow, metal, cylindrical body, has two robotic arms and moves around on a small set of wheels. He does not talk, but shows above-average human intelligence and uses a series of beeps to communicate. A digital face portraying his mood is shown on the screen.
- "Great Commander" Blurp – Former War Commander of Planet Yodiggity in the war against Zorch. He says he is a brave commander, but his actions say otherwise. Voiced by Jamie Watson.
- Xorch – He wishes to conquer the galaxy by gathering the Boom Cards. Voiced by Walter Borden.
- Headlock – Cohort of Zorch. He wears a dome on his head because it is abnormally small. His assistant's name is Gerone. Voiced by Morris Day.
- Etra – Headlock's evil older sister. She and Commander Blurp were trained by the same mentor. Voiced by Raven Dauda.
  - Young Etra voiced by Tajja Isen and also Dauda.

== Episodes ==
No.	Title	Original release date	Prod. code
1	"Droppin' Da Bomb"	September 11, 2004	101
Justin, his younger brother, and his two friends are transported inside a video game world where they discover a parallel universe.
2	"Statue of Limitations"	September 18, 2004	102
Da Boom Crew arrives at a village and meet an alien. He says that the once fertile land is turning to dust. Da Boom Crew take a fruit basket to the Protector to save the planet.
3	"Junk Planet"	September 25, 2004	103
The Da Boom Crew travel to a planet filled with junk.
4	"Frogday Afternoon"	October 2, 2004	104
The Da Boom Crew are suspended for intruding on a frog festival.
5	"Wanted!"	September 5, 2005 (on Cartoon Network UK)	105
The Da Boom Crew are mistaken for the notorious "Grargon Gang."
6	"Boom vs. Doom"	2005 (on Cartoon Network UK)	106
A mad inventor traps the Boom Crew inside his massive ship in order to use the Boom Carts to power his ultimate doom weapons.
7	"Planet of Lost Lives"	2005 (on Cartoon Network UK)	107
The Boom Crew encounter a friend from Earth on a creepy new planet.
8	"Baby Boom"	2005 (on Cartoon Network UK)	108
The Boom Crew become workers in Hedlok's outer space mine when they try to reunite an alien baby with its parents.
9	"Ice Ice Planet"	2005 (on Cartoon Network UK)	109
The Da Boom Crew land on an Ice planet but end up damaging a shield protecting villagers from the sheer cold and attempt to fix it.
10	"The Crimson Raider"	2005 (on Cartoon Network UK)	110
Commander Blurp joins the Boom Crew on a mission to explore an ocean planet where a Boom Cart is suspected of creating havoc with the sea life. But things are complicated when the gang encounters a villainous space pilot known as the "Crimson Raider."
11	"The Legendary Meemawzaza"	2005 (on Cartoon Network UK)	111
The Boom Crew encounters a legendary warrior and must complete a series of chores in order to procure a Boom Cart. But the kids' skills are put to the test when Hedlok and Etra arrive along with a villainous new weapon.
12	"The Hour of the Clipse: Part 1"	2005 (on Cartoon Network UK)	112
As Planet Yodiggity prepares to celebrate Freedom Day, the Boom Crew embarks on a mission to retrieve supposedly the last Boom Cart where they encounter a group of young alien orphans and their mysterious leader, DEXX ARBOLEAN. In their absence Zorch manages to steal all the Boom carts they were saving.
13	"The Hour of the Clipse: Part 2"	2005 (on Cartoon Network UK)	113
As Yodiggity celebrates Freedom Day, the Boom Crew embarks on their most dangerous mission yet. They infiltrate Zorch's ship and retrieve the stolen Boom Carts. The Boom Crew realize that the alien orphans' parents are still alive and are being kept captive by Zorch. As Zorch finally takes control of Yodiggity the Boom Crew meet up with DEXX and the other orphans requesting their help. The episode ends with DEXX stating he knows where they can find one final Boom Cart.

== Production ==
The series was produced by Berliner Film Companie, in association with Jambalaya Studios in Los Angeles, California. Unusual for an animated series targeted at children, Da Boom Crew was pulled from the Kids' WB! line-up and cancelled after only four episodes due to low ratings and negative viewer reception.

Animation Magazine had reported that a second season was in production. However, following the show's cancellation, the second season was never produced, most likely due to the lack of popularity and negative reception.

== Broadcast and release ==
The series premiered on The WB as part of the Kids' WB! schedule in September 2004. In the United Kingdom, all 13 episodes were broadcast on Cartoon Network UK in 2005.

The entire series is streaming on Tubi in the United States, as well as Amazon Prime Video with the Ameba addon.
