= Keith Reddin =

American actor and playwright (born 1956)

- Born: July 7, 1956 (age 70); Hackensack, New Jersey
- Education: Northwestern University (BS); Yale University (MFA)
- Occupations: Stage, film, television actor, playwright
- Spouse(s): Leslie Lyles (1986–2003), Meg Gibson (2007-present)

Keith Reddin (born July 7, 1956) is an American actor and playwright. He received his B.S. in 1978 from Northwestern University and then went on to attend Yale School of Drama until he received his M.A. in 1981.

Reddin was born in 1956 in Hackensack, New Jersey. He grew up in Englewood, New Jersey, and attended Dwight Morrow High School.

His plays Life and Limb, Rum and Coke, Highest Standard of Living, and But Not for Me all received their world premieres at South Coast Repertory. SCR also produced his adaptation of Alexander Buravsky's The Russian Teacher. Other plays include Nebraska, Life During Wartime, Brutality of Fact, All the Rage, The Prophets of Nature, and Frame 312. Adaptations include: Bulgakov's Black Snow, Shatrov's Maybe, Molière's The Imaginary Invalid, Anouilh's Antigone, and Thornton Wilder’s Heaven’s My Destination. Film and television include Big Time (American Playhouse), The Heart of Justice (TNT), Milken (TNT), The Alarmist, and All the Rage.

== Personal life ==
Reddin married actress Meg Gibson in 2007.

== Awards ==
- 1992 Whiting Award in Drama
- 1993 Joseph Jefferson Award for Best New Work for Black Snow
- 1997 Joseph Jefferson Award for Best New Work for All the Rage

== Plays ==
- Life and Limb (1984)
- Rum and Coke (1985)
- Big Time (1987)
- Nebraska (1989)
- The Doors (1991)
- Life During Wartime (1990)
- Brutality of Fact (1993)
- Almost Blue (1994)
- You Belong to Me (1995)
- All the Rage (1997)
- But Not for Me (1998)
- Synergy (2000)
- Frame 312 (2003)
- Human Error (2004)
- The Missionary Position (2006)
- The Will to Art (2008)
- Cleveland Heights (2008)
- HmatrixH (2010)
- Acquainted with the Night (2011)
