= Leslie Lyles =

American film actress

- Occupations: Actress; Dramatist
- Spouse: Keith Reddin (m. 1986; div. 2003)

Leslie Lyles is an American stage and screen actor, and a playwright. She also wrote the film Me and Veronica.

Her play Cleveland and Half-Way Back played at Ensemble Studio Theatre in February 1987, directed by James Hammerstein. It starred Cynthia Nixon and Keith Reddin as patients who escape from an inpatient mental institution. Critic Mel Gussow described the play as "derivative."

Lyles's play A Lifetime of Reasons was presented by All Seasons Theatre Group in the Art-Mart in New York City in January 1999, directed by Shirley Kaplan. The two-act play is about three sisters in a well-off family growing up in Ossining, New York. The first act features the sisters as children, the second act as adults.

== Personal life ==
Lyles was married to playwright and actor Keith Reddin.

== Filmography ==
=== Film ===
Leslie Lyles film credits
Year	Title	Role	Notes	Ref.
1987	Wall Street	Natalie		
1995	My Teacher's Wife	Elaine Boomer		
1999	Man on the Moon	Janice Kaufman		
1999	The Waiting Game	Therapist		
2000	The Photographer	Zora		
2003	Particles of Truth	Mrs. Wiley		
2004	Speak	Hairwoman		
2006	Slippery Slope	Judy Black		
2007	Gracie	Chairwoman Connie Bowsher		
2008	Side by Each	Patty		
2009	Landlocked	Martha Hall		
2011	We Need to Talk About Kevin	Smash Lady		
2013	Blue Jasmine	Hal and Jasmine's Friend		
2013	The Harvest	Grandmother		
2014	Fall to Rise	Ina Renwick		
2015	Louder Than Bombs	Principal		
2017	Marjorie Prime	Mrs. Salveson		

=== Television ===
Leslie Lyles television credits
Year	Title	Role	Notes	Ref.
1987	The Equalizer	Woman	Episode: "A Place to Stay"	
1987	Kate & Allie	Dr. Mitchell	1 episode	
1991	Law & Order	Reberty's Ex-Wife	Episode: "Sonata for Solo Organ"	
1992	Law & Order	Sharon Sacks	Episode: "Wedded Bliss"	
1994	Law & Order	Tennis Coach	Episode: "Doubles"	
1999	Law & Order: Special Victims Unit	Dr. Chatman	Episode: "A Single Life"	
2001	Law & Order	Karin	Episode: "Formerly Famous"	
2002	The Education of Max Bickford	Clarissa Elkins	1 episode	
2002	Law & Order: Criminal Intent	Mrs. Hagman	Episode: "Dead"	
2007	Law & Order: Criminal Intent	Mrs. Trebay	Episode: "Renewal"	
2010, 2011	The Good Wife	Judge Jane Moretti	2 episodes	
2011	Blue Bloods	Mrs. Freelander	Episode: "Thanksgiving"	
2014	Orange Is the New Black	Louise	1 episode	
2015	Jessica Jones	Maureen Denton	1 episode	
2017	Doubt	Gail Meyers	1 episode	
2017	Law & Order: Special Victims Unit	Sylvia Williams	Episode: "No Surrender"	
