= The Oranges (film) =

- Theatrical release poster
- Directed by: Julian Farino
- Written by: Ian Helfer; Jay Reiss
- Produced by: Anthony Bregman; Leslie Urdang; Dean Vanech
- Starring: Hugh Laurie; Catherine Keener; Oliver Platt; Allison Janney; Alia Shawkat; Adam Brody; Leighton Meester
- Cinematography: Steven Fierberg
- Edited by: Jeffrey M. Werner; Carole Kravetz Aykanian
- Music by: Klaus Badelt; Andrew Raiher
- Production companies: FilmNation Entertainment; Olympus Pictures; Likely Story
- Distributed by: ATO Pictures
- Release dates: September 10, 2011 (TIFF); October 5, 2012 (United States)
- Running time: 92 minutes
- Country: United States
- Language: English
- Budget: $7 million
- Box office: $1.9 million

The Oranges is a 2011 American romantic comedy-drama directed by Julian Farino and starring Hugh Laurie, Leighton Meester, Catherine Keener, Oliver Platt, Allison Janney, Alia Shawkat, and Adam Brody. The film chronicles how two families deal with a scandal involving a married man and his friend's daughter. Set in The Oranges area of Essex County, New Jersey, The Oranges was primarily filmed in New Rochelle, New York. It premiered at the Toronto International Film Festival on September 10, 2011, and was released in the United States on October 5, 2012, by ATO Pictures. The film received mostly negative reviews upon its release and criticism and attacks for its ageist themes and tropes.

== Plot ==
The story is narrated from the perspective of aspiring furniture designer Vanessa Walling, whose plan to stay at home for a few months after college has turned into years. She witnesses the heartache between her parents as their marriage falls apart. Their best friends, Terry and Cathy Ostroff, live across the street in their suburb of West Orange, New Jersey.

When the Ostroffs' prodigal 24-year-old daughter Nina returns home after a failed engagement, Vanessa is unhappy to see her back. The mothers of both families would like to see Nina form a relationship with the Wallings' jet-setting son Toby, but Nina herself is more interested in Toby's father David. Cathy discovers the affair after following Nina to a motel and seeing David there as well. Thus begins the meltdown of both families.

== Cast ==
=== The Wallings ===
- Hugh Laurie as David (father)
- Catherine Keener as Paige (mother)
- Adam Brody as Toby (son)
- Alia Shawkat as Vanessa (daughter)

=== The Ostroffs ===
- Oliver Platt as Terry (father)
- Allison Janney as Cathy (mother)
- Leighton Meester as Nina (daughter)

=== The Others ===
- Aya Cash as Maya
- Sam Rosen as Ethan
- Tim Guinee as Roger
- Cassidy Gard as Samantha
- Hoon Lee as Henry
- Heidi Kristoffer as Meredith
- Jennifer Bronstein as Amy
- Stephen Badalamenti as Taxi Driver
- John Srednicki as Waiter
- Betsy Aidem as Anne Allen

== Production ==
=== Writing and casting ===
"This is not a relationship that's meant to be lusty and inappropriate. It is a connection that the two of them have felt probably for some time; they've just never acted on it. He brings out the adult, grown, mature, developed side of her, and she brings out the free-spirited, happy-go-lucky kid in him."

— Meester on David and Nina's relationship

The script, by Jay Reiss and Ian Helfer, appeared on 2008's Black List of best unproduced work; that list also featured The Beaver and Inglourious Basterds. Reiss and Helfer wrote the spec script, inspired by a story they heard from friends, during the Writers Guild of America strike. The film marks Julian Farino's debut as motion picture director; he had previously directed episodes of Entourage.

Richard Gere's agent Ed Limato called Farino to tell him Gere was interested in the script, but Farino wanted only Hugh Laurie to play David because he had "that innate decency that could carry this thing". On February 8, 2010, Laurie was reported to be in talks to play his first feature lead role. Leighton Meester and Mila Kunis were also said to be under consideration for Nina. On February 28, it was confirmed that Meester had won the role and that Adam Brody, Alia Shawkat, Catherine Keener and Allison Janney were in negotiations.

Meester and Laurie had previously worked together when she guest-starred in two episodes of House, which had plot elements somewhat similar to those of The Oranges. In the 2006 House episode "Lines in the Sand", Meester's character is a 17-year-old who relentlessly pursues Laurie's character, flirting with him and insisting that they should have sex. He eventually diagnoses that a fungal spore in her brain has caused her loss of inhibition and judgment. Farino knew Meester from Entourage; he directed her in the show's first season. He approached her while she was in the dressing room, preparing for a Gossip Girl episode shooting, and they had a "rushed audition". Of her role, Meester said: "It's a complete 180-degree turn from anything I've ever done. This fulfills something within myself that I could never find in my series [Gossip Girl]." Alia Shawkat's name was the first mentioned by the casting director, but Farino met with many actresses for the role of Vanessa. Shawkat met Farino a year before she auditioned and he told her they were considering Elliot Page for the part. After Page turned it down, Shawkat auditioned twice and was cast. Allison Janney and Oliver Platt had also worked together before, on the television series The West Wing, while Catherine Keener and Platt had co-starred in the movie Please Give.

=== Filming ===
The ending was rewritten before shooting. During filming, Laurie, Meester, Janney, Platt, and Brody shared a house. While the film is set in the fall, from Thanksgiving to Christmas in New Jersey, principal filmography started at the end of March 2010 in the upscale Beechmont section of New Rochelle in Westchester County, New York, and lasted 29 days. Scenes were also shot in the neighboring Westchester communities of Mamaroneck and Bronxville, and at the Tropicana Casino in Atlantic City, New Jersey. The film was shot with Red cameras. Shawkat's character, Vanessa, narrates the film. Her voice-over was recorded in post-production. ATO Pictures acquired the distribution rights in September 2011.

== Release ==
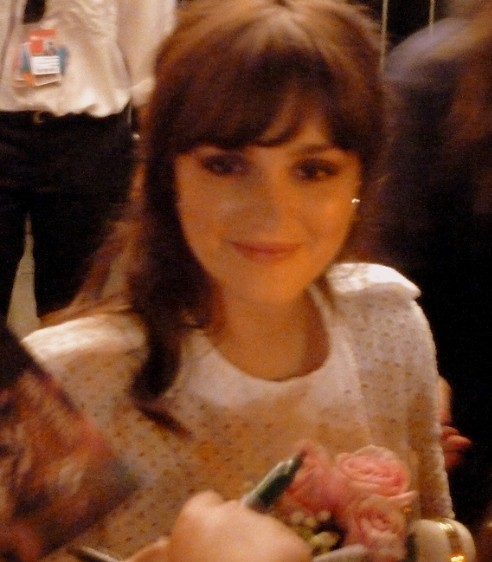
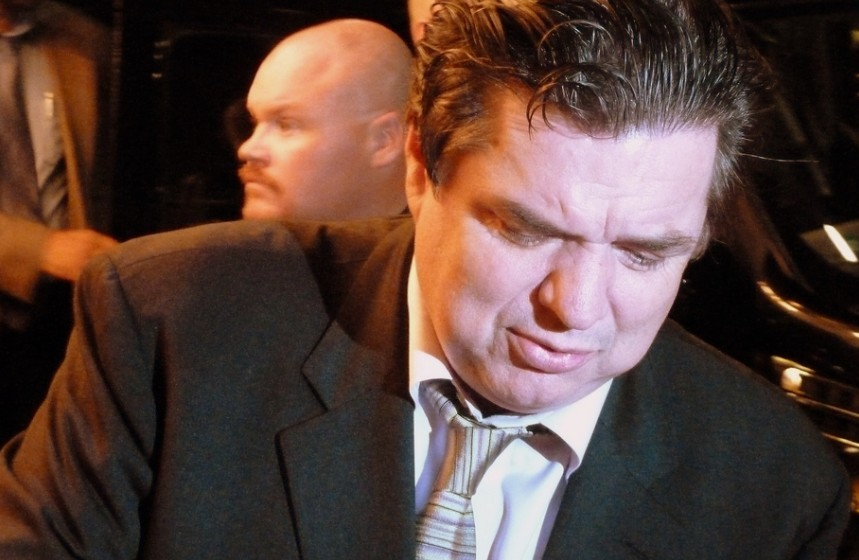
Leighton Meester (left) and Oliver Platt (right) at the Toronto Film Festival premiere in September 2011.

The film premiered at the Toronto International Film Festival on September 10, 2011, and opened the Montclair Film Festival on May 1, 2012. It received a limited release in the U.S. on October 5, 2012, screened in 110 theaters. The film was released in the UK on December 7, 2012.

=== Critical response ===
On Rotten Tomatoes, the film has a 30% approval rating based on 76 reviews, with an average rating of 4.9/10. The site's consensus is: "Despite the efforts of its accomplished cast, The Oranges suffers from a mediocre script that fails to deliver well-rounded characters, dramatic tension, or sufficient laughs." On Metacritic, it has a weighted score of 46 out of 100, based on 23 critics, indicating "mixed or average reviews".

Giving it 3 stars out of 4, Moira Macdonald of The Seattle Times called The Oranges "a superbly cast dark comedy; it's a familiar story made fresh by actors who know how to make each breath matter." She found the film funny. The San Francisco Chronicle reviewer Mick LaSalle wrote that despite feeling sometimes "inauthentic", the film "breaks formula; its concerns are not the usual movie concerns, and it takes what might have been a standard plot in some unexpected directions. [...] The film just examines the interpersonal dynamics in an honest way. This leads to conflicts but also to unexpected and effective moments of tenderness between various characters." He wrote that Laurie and Platt "stand out" because of the good writing for their characters and that Meester embodies her role well. Rafer Guzman of Newsday gave the film a 2-star rating out of 4 and wrote: "The Oranges hits and misses at random. Meester's Nina is absolutely radiant, but Laurie's David is a dour dullard. There are some genuinely moving moments, but the mayhem-in-suburbia slapstick falls flat. The film is certainly unpredictable, but that's partly because it doesn't know its own mind."

The Chicago Tribune critic Michael Phillips called the film "a comedy rueful but tidy and safe" and "a placid tale of impulses running wild" that sparked little interest in him, but called the ensemble "excellent". The Star-Ledger's writer Stephen Witty said the film "has a few good lines, and a fine cast." He found Laurie "particularly good", Keener "amusing", and Platt "charming", but expected more of the film: "You want something that plays a little sharper, and cuts a little deeper. You want something that demands more of its performers, and delivers more to its audience." The Hollywood Reporter critic David Rooney praised members of the cast "who manage to hit a sweet spot even in this mediocre material", noting that the film "runs out of juice" when it becomes serious and that its "cathartic moments feel fabricated", concluding that the cast "deserves better."

Stephen Holden of The New York Times said the film's problem is that its creators did not decide what genre The Oranges would be, "a dangerous comic satire or a serious dramatic downer", and instead occupied "a wishy-washy middle ground. As a comedy, it isn't funny; as serious drama, it lacks a moral and emotional center." The Los Angeles Times's reviewer called Vanessa "the most interesting character", praising her "sardonic perspective", but wrote that the film "never fully comes to life". Entertainment Weekly reviewer Owen Gleiberman found Meester "charming", but The Washington Post's Michael O'Sullivan felt that her performance lacked lightness and brightness and that she took the film too seriously.

=== Home media ===
The Oranges was released on DVD and Blu-ray on May 7, 2013.
