= Great Migrations =

- Genre: Documentary television
- Developed by: David Hamlin
- Directed by: David Hamlin
- Starring: Migratory animals
- Narrated by: Alec Baldwin; Latin America: Diego Luna/Thiago Lacerda; United Kingdom: Stephen Fry
- Composer: Anton Sanko
- Original language: English
- No. of seasons: 1
- No. of episodes: 7

Production
- Executive producer: Char Serwa
- Producers: David Hamlin; James Byrne
- Production location: Worldwide
- Cinematography: Bob Poole
- Production company: National Geographic

Original release
- Network: National Geographic Channel
- Release: 7 November – 20 November 2010

Great Migrations is a seven-episode nature documentary television miniseries that airs on the National Geographic Channel, featuring the great migrations of animals around the globe. The seven-part show is the largest programming event in the ten-year history of the channel and is part of the largest cross-platform initiative since the founding of the National Geographic Society. It was filmed in HD, and premiered on November 7, 2010 with accompanying coverage in the National Geographic magazine and an official companion book.

== Episodes ==
Great Migrations debuted on November 7, 2010 worldwide. The series airs on the Sundays of the same month, spread across four hour-long chapters, excluding three supplemental hours which run on other dates. The National Geographic Channel estimated that the show's premiere would be accessible in 330 million homes across the globe.

No.	Title	Original release date
1	"Born to Move"	November 7, 2010
Witness the dramatic migration of Christmas Island's red crabs as they travel from interior forests to mate on the beaches, braving battles with ferocious yellow ants; the monarch butterfly's annual journey that takes four generations to complete; and the sperm whale, who may travel more than a million miles in a lifetime.
2	"Need to Breed"	November 7, 2010
Witness awe-inspiring stories of species'need to reproduce such as stunning footage of flying foxes soaring across the skies with their young wrapped in their wings and the remarkable breeding behaviours of elephant seals in the Falkland Islands. For the first time in nearly 30 years, see the white-eared kob performing a deadly mating ritual in Sudan.
3	"Race to Survive"	November 14, 2010
Documented as never before, see hundreds of zebras make a desperate 240km slog so their bodies can take in much-needed minerals in Botswana. Next, witness the heartbreaking struggle of Pacific walruses that have become victims of Earth's changing climate. Watch a herd of pronghorn antelope follow its ancient migration through Wyoming. Then, journey alongside the mysterious whale shark.
4	"Feast or Famine"	November 14, 2010
Witness the fortitude of Mali elephants as they undertake the longest elephant migration on Earth. See the great white sharks that cover thousands of miles of ocean each year from Hawaii to Mexico to reach an abundant feast, and witness close-up the rarely filmed attack on a seal by a great white. Also, follow the golden jellyfish of Palau on a race to follow the sun.
5	"Science of Migrations"	November 20, 2010
6	"Behind the Scenes"	November 20, 2010
7	"Rhythm of Life"	November 20, 2010
The series' finale, this episode was entirely unnarrated, and instead mixed nature footage with original music in what the producers called a "visual concert". The episode received limited commercial interruption, unlike the four main chapters, although the breaks in those were regarded to be relatively unobtrusive. This episode was excluded from the 2010 3-Disc DVD set.

== Production ==
The production team traveled 420,000 miles (680,000 km) over two and a half years tracking multiple species ranging from army ants to Mali elephants. Cinematographers went to great lengths to film the species and their migratory habits, although none were hurt in the process. Filming provided rare footage of various animal scenes, including the documentation of an elephant's funeral for the first time outside East Africa. Various technologies were used to film the show, such as the use of high-tech tags on monarch butterflies and elephant seals.

The Cineflex Heligimbal gyrostabilized cameras was widely utilized in the production. It allows rock-solid closeups to be shot from a kilometer up, a height that does not disturb the animals being filmed. The series also uses the ultra-slow motion Phantom HD camera by Vision Research and the "beyond high-def" Red camera.

== Reception ==
Great Migrations was acclaimed, with considerable praise its cinematography and photography. The Washington Post remarked on the show's "compelling grandeur"; reviewer Tom Shales noted how contemporary nature films would inevitably be compared with the BBC classics, Planet Earth and Life. Great Migrations, he felt, superseded both in its narration and score. The Edmonton Journal went to the extent of praising the show's photography as being "so magnificent that there will be a boomlet in sales of high-definition televisions".

== Awards ==
Won Primetime Emmy as Best Documentary Film
