= Leslie Urdang =

American film producer and theatre executive

Urdang in 2026

Leslie R. Urdang Tenney is an American film producer and theatre executive.

== Education ==
Urdang attended Forest Hills High School in New York City, where she was Chairman of Senior SING! 1972 during her senior year, and at which she was the graduation speaker in 2016. She originally aspired to become a US senator, earning a B.A. in political science from the University of Pennsylvania. In 1977, after her graduation, Urdang interned for U.S. Senator John A. Durkin (D-N.H.), assisting with constituent communications and issue research.

In 1978, Urdang decided not to apply to the John F. Kennedy School of Government and instead sought and won entry to the Yale School of Drama, graduating in 1981. Her thesis there explored integrating the development of plays and films, which inspired her professional work.

== Career ==
Urdang began dancing professionally as a child in George Balanchine's staging of The Nutcracker, a chapter of her life documented in the 2006 film The Nutcracker Family: Behind the Magic.

After graduating from Yale's drama school in 1981, she, Mark Linn-Baker and Max Mayer co-founded New York Stage and Film as an institution for professional playwrights, directors, actors, and designers, as well apprentices, to live and work together to move their plays to Broadway and theaters throughout the nation. Projects have included the Tony Award-winning plays Side Man and Tru, John Patrick Shanley's Pulitzer Prize for Drama and Tony Award winning Doubt, and most notably the epochal, multiple-award-winning musical Hamilton. Urdang continues to be a Producing Director of the institution.

Urdang was a producer for Robert Redford's company Wildwood Enterprises and for Gary Ross' Larger Than Life Productions. At both companies she developed several projects including the Walter Salles directed The Motorcycle Diaries. With Michael Nozik and Michael Hoffman, Urdang founded Serenade Films as an independent film company designed to produce a slate of low budget production. Serenade produced Michael Cuesta's Twelve and Holding (2006 Independent Spirit Awards nominee), The Great New Wonderful with Maggie Gyllenhaal, Tony Shalhoub, Edie Falco, and Stephen Colbert, Michael Hoffman's Game 6 with Michael Keaton and Robert Downey, Jr., and The Narrows.

Some of her other producing credits include A Midsummer Night's Dream starring Michelle Pfeiffer and Kevin Kline, Me and Veronica starring Elizabeth McGovern and Patricia Wettig, People I Know starring Al Pacino, and Olympus Pictures' Adam starring Hugh Dancy and Rose Byrne. In March 2009, Urdang became president of Olympus Pictures, producing such films as Rabbit Hole, Beginners, Thanks for Sharing, The Oranges, and Mr. Pip. She is now President of Mar-Key Pictures and most recently produced The Family Fang and The Seagull.

== Personal life ==
In the early 1990s, Urdang shared a New York City brownstone with then-boyfriend actor Rob Morrow, during the years in which he was seen on television as the protagonist of the series Northern Exposure. In June 2012, Urdang married actor Jon Tenney.

== Filmography ==
- Me and Veronica (1993)
- A Midsummer Night's Dream (1999)
- People I Know (2002)
- Game 6 (2005)
- The Great New Wonderful (2005)
- Twelve and Holding (2005)
- The Narrows (2008)
- Adam (2009)
- Beginners (2010)
- Rabbit Hole (2010)
- The Oranges (2011)
- Mister Pip (2012)
- The Family Fang (2015)
- The Seagull (2018)
- Wild Mountain Thyme (2020)

== Recognition ==
=== Awards and nominations ===
- 2007, nominated for John Cassavetes Award at Independent Spirit Awards for Twelve and Holding
- In 2011 her film Beginners won the Gotham Award for Best Picture and the Oscar, Golden Globe and SAG award for Best Supporting Actor for Christopher Plummer.
- Her 2010 film Rabbit Hole won an Oscar and Golden Globe Best Actress nomination for Nicole Kidman.
