= Me and Veronica =

1993 American drama film

- Directed by: Don Scardino
- Written by: Leslie Lyles
- Produced by: Mark Linn-Baker; Max Mayer; Nellie Nugiel; Leslie Urdang
- Starring: Elizabeth McGovern; Patricia Wettig; Michael O'Keefe
- Cinematography: Michael F. Barrow
- Edited by: Jeffrey Wolf
- Music by: David Mansfield
- Production company: True Pictures
- Distributed by: Arrow Releasing
- Release dates: September 9, 1992 (Venice); September 24, 1993 (United States)
- Running time: 97 minutes
- Country: United States
- Language: English

Me and Veronica is a 1992 American drama film directed by Don Scardino (in his feature directorial debut), written by Leslie Lyles, and starring Elizabeth McGovern, Patricia Wettig and Michael O'Keefe.

== Cast ==
- Elizabeth McGovern as Fanny
- Patricia Wettig as Veronica
- Michael O'Keefe as Michael
- John Heard as Frankie
- Will Hare as "Red"
- Robert Leeshock as Jimmy
- Scott Renderer as Boner
- John Mazzello as Tommy
- Jessica Nanney as Carol
- Mike Starr as Vinnie
- Lola Pashalinski as Mabel
- William Preston as Old Man
- Sam Scardino as Fisherman
- Gareth Williams as Bartender
