= Jon Tenney =

American actor (born 1961)

- Tenney in 2026
- Born: Jonathan Frederick Tenney; December 16, 1961 (age 64); Princeton, New Jersey, U.S.
- Education: Vassar College (AB); Juilliard School
- Occupation: Actor
- Years active: 1986–present
- Spouses: Teri Hatcher (m. 1994; div. 2003); Leslie Urdang (m. 2012)
- Children: 1

Jonathan Frederick Tenney (born December 16, 1961) is an American actor. He played Special Agent Fritz Howard in TNT's The Closer and continued in its spin-off Major Crimes.

== Early life ==
Tenney was born in Princeton, New Jersey. His mother, Lillian Sandra Baum, was a psychiatrist, and his father, Frederick Haworth Tenney, was a research physicist. His maternal grandparents were Polish Jewish immigrants, while his paternal forebears were of English ancestry. He received his B.A. degree from Vassar College in 1984, where he majored in drama and philosophy. He later attended The Juilliard School's Drama Division as a member of Group 19 (1986–1990).

== Career ==
Tenney made his acting debut in a touring production of Mike Nichols' The Real Thing. He worked steadily on and off-Broadway, and in regional theater. In New York City, his stage credits include Biloxi Blues, The Substance of Fire and The Heiress. He began working on television, starring in a number of series, including Steven Bochco's Brooklyn South, Kristin Chenoweth's sitcom Kristin, and guest appearances on Cybill, Will & Grace, Murphy Brown, Spenser: For Hire and Get Real. Series with Tenney as a regular were canceled on all four major networks.

From 2005 to 2012, Tenney played Special Agent Fritz Howard, the husband of Deputy Chief Brenda Leigh Johnson (Kyra Sedgwick) in TNT's The Closer. For the 4th season of Lifetime's The Division in 2004, he played Hank Riley. When The Closer ended he continued to act in its spin-off, Major Crimes, from 2012 to 2018, with Howard becoming an LAPD deputy chief in the third season. Later, he portrayed Dr. Simon Craig, a love interest of Nora Walker (Sally Field) in Brothers & Sisters. In 2013, he starred with Rebecca Romijn in TNT's King & Maxwell, as Sean King, a former Secret Service agent and lawyer who works as a private investigator. The series was canceled after one season. In 2014, he was cast in a recurring role on Shonda Rhimes' drama series Scandal.

Tenney appeared in several films, including the villainous CEO of Benbrook Oil Company in Free Willy 2: The Adventure Home and the friend of Alex Whitman (Matthew Perry) in Fools Rush In. He also starred in small roles for some films, including Tombstone, Beverly Hills Cop III, Nixon, Music from Another Room and the 2009 horror film remake of The Stepfather. He also appeared in John Cameron Mitchell's film, Rabbit Hole. He portrayed Martin Jordan in the 2011 superhero film Green Lantern.

== Personal life ==
From 1994 to 2003, Tenney was married to Teri Hatcher, with whom he has a daughter. He married producer Leslie Urdang on June 16, 2012.

== Filmography ==
=== Film ===
Year	Title	Role	Notes
1991	Guilty by Suspicion	Shopper Husband	
1993	Watch It	Michael	
1993	Tombstone	Johnny Behan	
1994	Beverly Hills Cop III	Levine	
1994	Lassie	Steve Turner	
1995	Free Willy 2: The Adventure Home	John Milner	
1995	Nixon	Reporter #1	
1996	The Phantom	Jimmy Wells	
1996	The Twilight of the Golds	Rob Stein	
1997	Fools Rush In	Jeff	
1997	Lovelife	Alan	
1998	Homegrown	Helicopter Pilot	
1998	Music from Another Room	Eric	
1998	With Friends Like These...	Dorian Mastandrea	
1999	Entropy	Kevin	
1999	Advice from a Caterpillar	Suit	
2000	You Can Count on Me	Bob Steegerson	
2002	Buying the Cow	Andrew Hahn	
2005	Looking for Comedy in the Muslim World	Mark	
2009	The Stepfather	Jay	
2010	Legion	Howard Anderson	
2010	Rabbit Hole	Rick	
2010	Radio Free Albemuth	FBI Agent #1	
2011	Green Lantern	Martin Jordan	
2011	Hide Away	The Divorced Man	
2013	As Cool As I Am	Bob	
2014	The Best of Me	Harvey Collier	
2015	Love the Coopers	Dr Morrissey	
2018	The Seagull	Dorn	
2019	I See You	Greg Harper	
2020	Wild Mountain Thyme	Pub MC	

=== Television ===
Year	Title	Role	Notes
1986	Spenser: For Hire	Garrett	Episode: "Shadowsight"
1988	Alone in the Neon Jungle	Todd Hansen	Television film
1989	Murphy Brown	Josh Silverberg	Episode: "The Brothers Silverberg"
1990–1991	Equal Justice	Peter Bauer	25 episodes
1993	Tales from the Crypt	Alex	Episode: "Half-Way Horrible"
1993	Crime & Punishment	Det. Ken O'Donnell	6 episodes
1995	Almost Perfect	Adams / Tony Madden	2 episodes
1996	Good Company	Will Hennessey	6 episodes
1996	Lois & Clark: The New Adventures of Superman	Lt. Ching	2 episodes
1996	Cybill	Jack	2 episodes
1997	The Outer Limits	Aidan Hunter	Episode: "Bits of Love"
1997–1998	Brooklyn South	Patrol Sgt. Francis 'Frank' Xavier Donovan	22 episodes
1999–2000	Get Real	Mitch Green	22 episodes
2001	Kristin	Tommy Ballantine	13 episodes
2001	Will & Grace	Paul Truman	Episode: "Moveable Feast"
2004	The District	Dan Lustig	Episode: "Family Values"
2004	Without a Trace	Mr. Benjamin Palmer	Episode: "Bait"
2004	The Division	Hank Riley	9 episodes
2004	CSI: Crime Scene Investigation	Charlie Macklin	Episode: "Formalities"
2005	Masters of Horror	David Murch	Episode: "Homecoming"
2005–2012	The Closer	FBI Special Agent Fritz Howard	109 episodes
2009	American Dad!	Father Carrington / Lawyer #2 / Man (voices)	3 episodes
2009–2010	Brothers & Sisters	Dr. Simon Craig	5 episodes
2012	The Newsroom	Wade Campbell	3 episodes
2012–2016	Major Crimes	FBI Special Agent/LAPD Deputy Chief Fritz Howard	29 episodes
2013	King & Maxwell	Sean King	10 episodes
2014–2016	Scandal	Andrew Nichols	15 episodes
2015–2017	Hand of God	Nick Tramble	9 episodes
2017	Longmire	FBI Agent Vance	Episode: "Running Eagle Challenge"
2017	Story of a Girl	Ray Lambert	Television film
2018	The Romanoffs	Eric Ford	Episode: "Expectation"
2019	True Detective	Alan Jones	5 episodes
2020	Next	Special Agent Brian Farrell	Episode: "FILE #8"
2022–2024	The Lincoln Lawyer	Mickey Haller Sr.	3 episodes
2022	And Just Like That...	Peter	3 episodes
2024	Cruel Intentions	Congressman Russell	3 episodes
2026	American Classic	Jon Bean	
