= Ouija 4 =

2015 Hong Kong film by Jill Wong

- DVD Cover Artwork
- Directed by: Jill Wong
- Written by: Patrick Kong
- Starring: Jacquelin Ch'ng
- Cinematography: Siuki Yip
- Distributed by: Cinedigm
- Release date: 15 October 2015
- Running time: 85 minutes
- Country: Hong Kong
- Language: Cantonese

Are You Here (Chinese: 碟仙碟仙; Jyutping: Dip^{6} Sin^{1} Dip^{6} Sin^{1}), also known as Ouija 4 in its DVD release, is a 2015 Hong Kong supernatural horror film directed by Jill Wong. It is an unofficial sequel to Ouija and Ouija: Origin of Evil made by Blumhouse Productions (also following the re-titled horror film Ouija 3: The Charlie Charlie Challenge distributed by Cinedigm). This film is completely unrelated to the official Blumhouse Ouija film series. Unlike Ouija 3: The Charlie Charlie Challenge, this entry does feature a Ouija board.

== Plot ==
Business partners get caught up in a game of supernatural horror when playing an online Ouija board.

== Release ==
Released on DVD 3 April 2018 by Cinedigm.
