= Jessabelle =

2014 film by Kevin Greutert

- Theatrical release poster
- Directed by: Kevin Greutert
- Written by: Robert Ben Garant
- Produced by: Jason Blum
- Starring: Sarah Snook; Mark Webber; David Andrews; Joelle Carter; Ana de la Reguera
- Cinematography: Michael Fimognari
- Edited by: Kevin Greutert
- Music by: Anton Sanko
- Production companies: Lionsgate; Blumhouse Productions
- Distributed by: Lionsgate
- Release date: November 7, 2014 (United States)
- Running time: 90 minutes
- Country: United States
- Language: English
- Budget: $4 million
- Box office: $7 million

Jessabelle is a 2014 American supernatural horror film directed and edited by Kevin Greutert and written by Ben Garant. The film stars Sarah Snook, Mark Webber, David Andrews, Joelle Carter, and Ana de la Reguera. The film was released by Lionsgate on November 7, 2014.

== Plot ==
Jessie Laurent, who is pregnant, is about to move to her fiancé, Mark's house when their car is hit by a truck just when they are backing up their car from the driveway, killing Mark and causing Jessie's miscarriage. Two months afterward, Jessie, who now uses a wheelchair, moves in with her estranged father, Leon, in St. Francisville, Louisiana. She resides in her mother's former bedroom. Her mother, Kate, died due to a brain tumor shortly after she was born, with Leon subsequently leaving her to be raised by her aunt.

One day, Jessie finds a box containing four videotapes shot by Kate. Addressing Jessie by her full name, she congratulates her on her 18th birthday and gives a tarot reading about Death that tells of a transition, taught to her by a friend whom she met at a local church. Kate warns that an unwanted presence is haunting Jessie, a reading that turns out to be true, as Jessie feels that a gaunt black-haired woman is haunting her ever since she moved back into her father's house. Jessie also has a vivid dream where she is strapped to a bed by her mother and witnesses a voodoo ritual being conducted, where blood flowing into a breathing machine chokes her. Leon repeatedly tries to dissuade Jessie from watching the tapes by breaking the first one and throwing Jessie's wheelchair into the bayou.

One day, Jessie has a frightening encounter in the bathtub with the same woman during a physical therapy session. After lifting Jessie onto Kate's old wheelchair, Leon coerces her physical therapist into leaving the house. After telling Jessie that the Kate in the tapes is not her mother due to the tumors she had, Leon attempts to burn all of the tapes, but a supernatural force burns him alive inside the yard shed.

During Leon's funeral, Jessie reunites with her high school friend, Preston, but collapses after she sees a severely burned man (Vaughan Wilson). After Preston leaves from tending to Jessie, she watches the third tape, which was focused on Leon and Kate in an outing and their Christmas party with the announcement of the latter's pregnancy, and the fourth tape, in which it focused on the foretold tarot readings and Kate tearfully shouting "You're dead!" before the footage cut off. After watching the tape, Jessie notices the woman behind her in the mirror. The mirror then shatters, and Jessie discovers a small secret compartment holding a tape (that wasn't found in the box) with no label on it that she opts not to watch. The next day, Jessie and Preston head across a nearby bayou, which Jessie has been suspicious of since observing glittering light and flames appearing there. The two discover voodoo icons and effects, as well as a grave of "Jessabelle" with a baby's skeleton, dated on Jessie's birthday, which they turn over to Sheriff Pruitt for DNA testing. Jessie and Preston then visit the house of Mrs. Davis, the mother of one of their friends and the Laurents' former family cook, who speaks about Moses Harper, Kate's aforementioned friend from her church mentioned in the second tape. Thinking that Moses may be involved in supernatural occurrences, the two head to Moses' voodoo shrine in a ruined church, but are attacked by a group of men who force them to leave.

The two return to Jessie's home where Preston confesses that, despite being married, he is in love with Jessie. Preston offers to let Jessie live with his mother, which she accepts. Just before Jessie can finish her packing; Preston is attacked by the ghostly woman and knocked unconscious.

Now left alone, Jessie conducts a ritual to summon the woman. After the ritual, Jessie is called by Pruitt, who informs her that the baby was Kate's daughter, but not Leon's. She plays the blank tape which presents Kate casting a voodoo enchantment on a newborn white girl and committing suicide by gunshot, not before tearfully shouting that Jessabelle and her father Moses are dead, attempting to suffocate the infant girl with a pillow, and changing her mind to conduct the incantation. Jessie is confronted by Kate's spirit and realizes the truth that her "father" was hiding from her: the videotapes filmed were for Jessabelle, who was the daughter of Kate and Moses as the product of an interracial affair at the same church mentioned in the second tape. Jessabelle was killed on the night of her birth, along with her father, by Leon. On that night, Leon scolded Kate for being unfaithful, picked up Jessabelle from her crib, and snapped her spine in half. After Kate laments as she holds her daughter's now-lifeless body, Leon pushed a baby carriage carrying her lifeless body and a porcelain doll inside into the bayou, weighing it down with stones to prevent it from resurfacing. Leon then drove up to Kate and Moses' church where he shot Moses and set the building ablaze, leaving Moses for dead in the burning church. Jessie realizes that she is the unwanted presence, being the newborn white girl adopted by Leon on that same night to cover up the murders.

Swearing revenge, Kate and Moses planned to transfer Jessabelle's spirit to Jessie. Jessie is pushed by Kate and Moses' spirits towards the bayou and into it, where the biracial spirit of Jessabelle swims up and takes her mother's bracelet, resurfacing back in the same white physical body of Jessie. Preston jumps in to save her and she kisses him and asks him to take her home. When Pruitt asks "Miss Laurent" if she is all right, she replies "It's Jessabelle".

== Cast ==
- Sarah Snook as Jessie
- Joelle Carter as Kate
- Mark Webber as Preston
- David Andrews as Leon
- Ana de la Reguera as Rosaura
- Amber Stevens as Dead Girl
- Chris Ellis as Sheriff Pruitt
- Brian Hallisay as Mark
- Vaughn Wilson as Moses
- Larisa Oleynik as Sam
- Lucius Baston as Mr. Woods
- Karen Strassman as additional Dead Girl vocals

== Production ==
Greutert was approached to direct Jessabelle a year after the release of Saw 3D and, after reading through the script, agreed to direct. Filming was initially meant to take place in Louisiana, where the film is set, but was forced to move to Wilmington, North Carolina after no appropriate filming location could be located. in April 2012, it was reported Amber Stevens, Ana de la Reguera, Sarah Snook and Mark Webber had all been cast in the film.

== Release ==
Greutert edited the film on his own and initially, the film was slated to release on January 10, 2014, The film was later pushed back to an August 29 release date before it was given a limited release and video on demand release on November 7.

== Reception ==
Review aggregator Rotten Tomatoes reports that 29% of 35 critics have given the film a positive review, with an average rating of 4.7 out of 10. The website's critical consensus reads "Jessabelle hints at a bright future for star Sarah Snook, but clouds her performance with a clichéd—and tasteless—storyline". Metacritic gives the film a weighted average rating of 37 out of 100, based on 14 reviews, indicating "generally unfavorable" reviews.

Justin Chang wrote in Variety, "Making atmospheric use of the Louisiana locations, Michael Fimognari’s digital lensing alternates nicely between pleasingly sun-drenched exteriors and sewer-toned nighttime interiors," but concluded, "novel twists and effective scares prove few and far between in this ludicrous bayou gothic." Sheila O'Mally wrote, "Steeped in Southern Gothic melodrama, Jessabelle is interesting in some of the small details, and in its strong sense of the Louisiana bayou atmosphere, and then it completely falls apart when it starts being a horror film. In The New York Post, Sarah Stewart called the film, " occasionally shivery, (but) overly familiar. Slant Magazine and IGN both panned the film, with IGN stating that "Jessabelle's familiar trickery and repetitive screams sucks the life out of a promising Southern bayou atmosphere." Jordan Hoffman wrote in The New York Daily News, "There are few scares here, but plenty of mild grossness. The absurd ending ties up the mystery in a way that’s sure to annoy both supernaturalists and realists." Alan Scherstuhl wrote in Village Voice, "There's a couple fine (but gratingly shriek-y) ghost scares, and some grandly ripe (and dopily predictable) VHS messages from beyond the grave. But the mystery drags, its clues never really registering — they just accumulate, along with hints of backstory, a laundry-like pile you would prefer not to deal with but will have to sort through eventually."

Fangoria was more positive in their review, writing "If the buildup is more satisfying than the payoff, Jessabelle remains a creditable attempt to do something a little different and down-to-Earth on the paranormal scene."
