= The Seagull (2018 film) =

- Theatrical release poster
- Directed by: Michael Mayer
- Screenplay by: Stephen Karam
- Based on: The Seagull by Anton Chekhov
- Produced by: Jay Franke; David Herro; Robert Salerno; Tom Hulce; Leslie Urdang
- Starring: Annette Bening; Saoirse Ronan; Corey Stoll; Elisabeth Moss; Mare Winningham; Jon Tenney; Glenn Fleshler; Michael Zegen; Billy Howle; Brian Dennehy
- Cinematography: Matthew J. Lloyd
- Edited by: Annette Davey
- Music by: Nico Muhly; Anton Sanko
- Production companies: Mar-Key Pictures; KGB Media
- Distributed by: Sony Pictures Classics
- Release dates: April 21, 2018 (Tribeca); May 11, 2018 (United States)
- Running time: 98 minutes
- Country: United States
- Language: English
- Box office: $1.5 million

The Seagull is a 2018 American historical drama film directed by Michael Mayer with a screenplay by Stephen Karam, based on the 1896 play of the same name by Anton Chekhov. The film stars Annette Bening, Saoirse Ronan, Corey Stoll, Elisabeth Moss, Mare Winningham, Jon Tenney, Glenn Fleshler, Michael Zegen, Billy Howle and Brian Dennehy. Filming began in June 2015 in New York City, much of it shot in Monroe, New York, 50 miles north of New York City, and the world premiere took place at the Tribeca Film Festival on April 21, 2018, prior to general release on May 11, 2018, through Sony Pictures Classics.

== Synopsis ==
Set in Russia in the early 1900s, an aging actress named Irina Arkadina pays summer visits to her brother Pjotr Nikolayevich Sorin and her son Konstantin at a country estate. On one occasion, she brings her lover Boris Trigorin, a successful novelist. Nina, a free and innocent girl on a neighboring estate, who is in a relationship with Konstantin, falls in love with Boris.

== Cast ==
- Annette Bening as Irina Arkadina, an actress. Mother to Konstantin and Boris' lover.
- Saoirse Ronan as Nina Zarechnaya, young actress and lover of Konstantin.
- Corey Stoll as Boris Trigorin, a successful author and Irina's lover.
- Elisabeth Moss as Masha, daughter of Polina and Shamrayev.
- Mare Winningham as Polina, wife to Shamrayev.
- Jon Tenney as Dr. Sergeyevich Dorn
- Glenn Fleshler as Shamrayev, father of Masha and husband to Polina.
- Michael Zegen as Semyon Medvedenko, a young schoolteacher in love with Masha.
- Billy Howle as Konstantin Treplyov, a playwright in a tumultuous relationship with Nina.
- Brian Dennehy as Sorin Arkadin, Irina's aging brother.

== Production ==
On May 13, 2015, it was announced that Michael Mayer would direct the adaptation of Anton Chekhov's play The Seagull, scripted by Stephen Karam. Saoirse Ronan and Annette Bening would star along with Corey Stoll and Billy Howle. Producers are Leslie Urdang, Tom Hulce and Robert Salerno.

Filming began on June 29, 2015, in New York City, with much of the film shot on location at Arrow Park in Monroe, NY.

== Release ==
In October 2017, Sony Pictures Classics acquired distribution rights to the film in North and Latin America, Germany, Scandinavia, Greece, Eastern Europe and Asia excluding China, Korea and Japan. The film had its world premiere at the Tribeca Film Festival on April 21, 2018. It was released on May 11, 2018.

=== Critical response ===
On review aggregator website Rotten Tomatoes, the film holds an approval rating of 68%, based on 125 reviews, with an average of 6.1/10. The website's critical consensus reads, "The latest iteration of The Seagull does little to distinguish itself from other Chekhov adaptations but provides a pleasing showcase for its sterling cast." On Metacritic, the film has a weighted average score of 58 out of 100, based on 31 critics, indicating "mixed or average reviews".

A.O. Scott reviewing the film for The New York Times found the cast for the film to be very well selected for their roles but the film as a whole to be disappointing stating: "Ms. Bening, Ms. Moss and Ms. Ronan in particular are superb, as you also probably didn’t need me to tell you. Each one finds the individuality that Chekhov, with uncanny sympathy and sly gallantry, imparted to his female characters. The cast is great. The play is great. But this is still a bad movie, because it has no clear or coherent idea of how to be one".

=== Accolades ===
| Award | Date of ceremony | Category | Recipient(s) | Result | Ref. |
|---|---|---|---|---|---|
| Sant Jordi Awards | April 30, 2019 | Best Actress in a Foreign Film | Annette Bening (also for Film Stars Don't Die in Liverpool) | Nominated | |
| Women's Image Network Awards | February 22, 2019 | Outstanding Film Produced by a Woman | Leslie Urdang | Won | |
| Chlotrudis Awards | March 19, 2019 | Best Production Design | Jane Musky | Nominated | |
| CineLibri International Book and Movie Festival | October 24, 2018 | Grand Prize for the Best Literary Adaptation | The Seagull | Nominated | |
