= Jackals (2017 film) =

2017 film by Kevin Greutert

- Film poster
- Directed by: Kevin Greutert
- Written by: Jared Rivet
- Produced by: Tommy Alastra
- Starring: Deborah Kara Unger; Ben Sullivan; Chelsea Ricketts; Nick Roux; Johnathon Schaech; Stephen Dorff
- Cinematography: Andrew Russo
- Edited by: John Coniglio; Kevin Greutert
- Music by: Anton Sanko
- Production company: Tommy Alastra Pictures
- Distributed by: Shout! Factory
- Release dates: August 11, 2017 (Popcorn Frights Film Festival); September 1, 2017 (United States)
- Running time: 85 minutes
- Country: United States
- Language: English
- Box office: $85,410

Jackals is a 2017 American horror thriller film directed and co-edited by Kevin Greutert and produced by Tommy Alastra. The film is written by Jared Rivet and stars Deborah Kara Unger, Ben Sullivan, Chelsea Ricketts, Nick Roux, Johnathon Schaech, and Stephen Dorff.

== Plot ==
In 1983, deprogrammer Jimmy Levine has been hired by a family to retrieve their estranged son, Justin Powell, from a murderous cult. Levine, along with the boy's father, Andrew Powell, forcibly remove Justin from the cult's clutches during what was staged to look like a kidnapping. The family, consisting of father, Andrew, mother, Kathy, older brother, Campbell, and Justin's former girlfriend, Samantha, along with her and Justin's baby, Zoey, had gathered for an intervention at Andrew’s cabin in the woods. Levine, who has either been in a cult himself or had a family member in a cult, attempts to reach Justin by various confrontational methods with no apparent success as Justin continues to appear brainwashed and insists that his real "family" is coming and will kill them all.

With Justin unmoved by pleas made by his mother and Samantha, frustrations mount as Justin's brother and father clash over the effectiveness of Jimmy's methods and prior family issues resurface, such as why the parents had really separated. While still attempting to deprogram Justin, the family find themselves surrounded by Justin’s cult who silently appear to demand that their captive member be returned to them.

First, “Fox Girl” appears near the cabin and can be seen carving the cult’s symbol into a rock, which prompts Jimmy to confront her. After asking her repeatedly to leave, Jimmy walks into a trap which ties his hands, causing him to drop his gun, and soon after, his stomach slashed while his body is mutilated. A short time later as the family struggles to understand what is happening, more cultists silently appear. Several attempts to kill the family and retrieve Justin follow, with Justin's brother and father defending the family and alternatively arguing as the cultist's attacks increase. They manage to kill or incapacitate those cultists who invade the cabin, while Kathy manages to burn one with scalding oil and wounds another's hands while he was trying to push through the door.

Justin, bound, remains unfazed at his family's struggles and continues to taunt them, insisting that the cultists will not stop until he is set free to return to them. Jimmy is used as bait and a distraction by the cultists—he is rescued by the Powells but dies shortly afterwards from his injuries. During a botched attempt to get help, Justin's brother Campbell is captured. He is tied onto a swing set on the cabin grounds and his hands are set afire, one after the other, by the Lead Cultist. His mother Kathy, horrified, struggles not to go help Campbell, but then in her grief rushes out to meet the cultists, who easily capture her. Samantha, who tried to stop Kathy, then focuses on trying to convince Justin to communicate with the cultists and stop their threatening the family. Andrew rushes out with a pickaxe in an attempt to fight off the cultists and rescue his wife and son when he is outnumbered, outflanked, and stabbed several times until he collapses. Kathy is horrified, then her throat is slit by Fox Girl. Both parents die looking across from one another on the ground in the dirt at the feet of the cultists, and Campbell seems to succumb to his injuries while still tied to the swing set.

Justin seems at last to show some recovery and asks that Samantha trust him and release him; she does with some trepidation. Justin suggests a desperate escape to Samantha while he meets the cultists. Samantha takes her baby and attempts to escape via a back door to the cabin and makes it to a road in the middle of the night. Justin appears to supplicate himself before the Lead Cultist, kneeling and pressing his head to the Leader's hand. Just as help via a vehicle seems possible, the headlights of the vehicle reveal that a cultist is behind Samantha.

== Cast ==
- Stephen Dorff as Jimmy Levine
- Johnathon Schaech as Andrew Powell
- Deborah Kara Unger as Kathy Powell
- Ben Sullivan as Justin Powell
- Chelsea Ricketts as Samantha
- Rxchie as Jackal
- Nick Roux as Campbell Powell
- Cassie Hernandez as Luisa
- Alex Castillo as Eloy
- Carol Abney as Mariana
- Alex Kingi as Mateo
- Jason Scott Jenkins as Lead Cultist
- Alyssa Julya Smith as Fox Girl

== Production ==
In May 2013, the film was officially announced under the title Sacrilege with Darren Lynn Bousman directing and with Rick Dugdale and Sean E. DeMott attached to produce. Red Sea Media acquired the rights to distribute the film internationally. Bousman would quietly depart the project with Kevin Greutert taking over directing duties and Jared Rivet writing the script. By December 2016, production had wrapped, along with the confirmation of Stephen Dorff joining the cast.

== Release and distribution ==
Jackals was sold at Marché du Film, introduced by Highland Film Group, where Shout! Factory purchased the rights to distribute the film throughout North America. The film has made multiple appearances at horror film festivals, including Fright Fest at Leicester Square in London, and the Popcorn Frights Film Festival in Miami, Florida.

== Critical reception ==
Jackals received mostly negative reviews from critics. On review aggregator Rotten Tomatoes, the film has an approval rating of 40%, based on 15 reviews, with an average score of 5.2/10. On Metacritic, the film has a score of 33 out of 100, based on 4 critics, indicating "generally unfavorable" reviews.

Chuck Bowen of Slant Magazine gave the film 1.5 stars out of 4, writing, "there's a reference to Straw Dogs, but Jackals doesn't have the Sam Peckinpah film's sense of give and take, in which characters on both sides of the moral equator are allowed to surprise us with their ingenuity." Rick Bentley wrote in The Miami Herald, "Jackals can't scare up anything original," adding, "each scene in Jackals echoes similar moments in The Purge, Wrong Turn, House of the Dead, Green Room, and so many other titles. Adding to the horror flashbacks are the masks the cult members wear that look a lot like those worn in You're Next." John DeFore of The Hollywood Reporter called it "a competent but completely forgettable cult-versus-family flick."

Noel Murray of The Los Angeles Times gave the film a mildly positive review, stating "Greutert’s new horror film Jackals (written by Jared Rivet) feels disappointingly derivative of the movie he worked on a decade ago, but at least he knows how to shape this kind of material into something relatively jolting."
