= Boogeyman (film) =

2005 film by Stephen Kay

- Theatrical release poster
- Directed by: Stephen Kay
- Screenplay by: Eric Kripke; Juliet Snowden; Stiles White
- Story by: Eric Kripke
- Produced by: Sam Raimi; Rob Tapert
- Starring: Barry Watson; Emily Deschanel; Skye McCole Bartusiak; Lucy Lawless
- Cinematography: Bobby Bukowski
- Edited by: John Axelrad
- Music by: Joseph LoDuca
- Production companies: Senator International; Ghost House Pictures; Pacific Renaissance Pictures Ltd.
- Distributed by: Sony Pictures Releasing (through Screen Gems; North America); Universal Pictures (New Zealand and Germany, through United International Pictures)
- Release date: February 4, 2005
- Running time: 89 minutes
- Countries: United States; New Zealand; Germany
- Language: English
- Budget: $20 million
- Box office: $67.2 million

Boogeyman is a 2005 supernatural horror film directed by Stephen Kay and starring Barry Watson, Emily Deschanel, Skye McCole Bartusiak, Tory Mussett, Charles Mesure, and Lucy Lawless. Written by Eric Kripke, Juliet Snowden, and Stiles White, from a story by Kripke, the film is a new take on the classic "boogeyman", or monster in the closet, who is the eponymous antagonist of the film. The plot concerns a young man who returns to the house he grew up in to confront the childhood terror that has affected his life. It’s an international co-production between the United States, New Zealand and Germany.

The film was panned by critics, often citing a generic and unoriginal plot as the main criticism. Despite receiving negative reviews from critics, it was a financial success and was followed by two direct-to-video sequels, Boogeyman 2 (2007) and Boogeyman 3 (2008).

== Plot ==
During his childhood, Tim Jensen witnesses his father being taken by the Boogeyman, an evil creature which lives in all closets worldwide. Since then, he has taken precautions to ensure that the Boogeyman cannot get to him, such as sleeping on a mattress on the floor, and removing all closets from his home, and keeping all his clothes in a dresser drawer.

After a Thanksgiving trip with his girlfriend Jessica to her parents' house, Tim has a premonition in which his mother tells him to return to the family home. Soon after, he receives a call from his uncle informing him that his mother has died. Upon returning to the psychiatric ward, where he grew up after his father died, he discovers that one of the patients, a young girl, is being terrorized by something hiding in the ceiling of her room.

Upon a suggestion by his psychiatrist that returning to his family home to spend the night in that house would be a good idea, Tim returns to his old Victorian style house in the open country, where he relives memories of his mother telling his father that the Boogeyman does not exist and therefore cannot possibly harm Tim. Tim is briefly attacked by the Boogeyman when he enters the downstairs closet.

Tim meets a young girl named Franny in his woodshed; she wants to know if it's true that the Boogeyman murdered Tim's father. Searching the woodshed, he discovers a file of Missing Person lists and documents left by Franny, and upon flicking through them, he discovers a disturbing collection of missing children who were all taken by the Boogeyman.

Tim panics and attempts to leave, but Jessica abruptly shows up and takes Tim out of the house for a night to a quiet motel, where she is murdered by the Boogeyman, dragging her into the bath.

Tim returns from getting ice and preparing drinks and enters the bathroom, where he finds that Jessica is missing. He realizes what has occurred, and stumbles blindly into a closet, and then walks out into his family home, just as Kate, his childhood friend, has returned to his home and, upon hearing noises from the closets, was about to open the door herself. Tim drags Kate back to the hotel, where they find the empty bath; this time with blood on the side. Kate begins thinking that Tim might've harmed Jessica, but Tim angrily denies it. Frustrated at Tim's refusal to tell her what is really wrong with him, Kate drives them back to her house where Tim spots something in the window. Kate claims that the person Tim saw was in fact her father. She then calls Tim's Uncle Mike to have him check on Tim. But he is captured and taken away by the Boogeyman.

Tim returns to his house and meets Franny once more, who leads him to a house full of proclamations describing the Boogeyman. There is a chair in the middle of the room facing a closet. Tim remembers this house as being the home of a doctor who everyone thought was insane. Franny then reveals herself to be the doctor's daughter and one of the kids the Boogeyman took, telling Tim he'd best go to the place where it all started. The Boogeyman pulls Tim through various portals in time through the closet, eventually depositing him in his childhood room. Realizing its true weakness, Tim smashes various toys the Boogeyman uses to give itself form, eventually defeating it, and vanishing into the void.

With the Boogeyman gone, Tim hopes that his and Kate's lives will be safer. Morning dawns and Tim already feels better, thinking he's finally safe. However, a post-credits scene reveals a young girl being tormented by the monster, revealing that the Boogeyman has resurfaced out of the closet.

== Cast ==
- Barry Watson as Tim "Timothy" Jensen
  - Aaron Murphy as Young Tim Jensen
- Emily Deschanel as Kate Houghton
- Skye McCole Bartusiak as Franny Roberts
- Tory Mussett as Jessica
- Andrew Glover as Boogeyman
- Charles Mesure as Rob Jensen
- Lucy Lawless as Mary Jensen
- Phil Gordon as Uncle Mike
- Jennifer Rucker as Pam "Pamela"
- Scott Wills as Co-Worker
- Michael Saccente as Jessica's Father
- Louise Wallace as Jessica's Mother
- Brenda Simmons as Jessica's Grandmother
- Josie Tweed as Jessica's Sister
- Ian Campbell as Mr. Roberts
- Robyn Malcolm as Dr. Matheson
- Olivia Tennet as Terrified Girl
- Edward Campbell as Priest
- Andrew Eggleton as Jessica's Brother-in-law

== Production ==
In May 2002, it was reported Sam Raimi and Rob Tapert would be producing The Boogeyman written by Eric Kripke which would follow a young man traumatized by memories of childhood encounters with the Bogeyman who following the death of his father returns home to confront his fears.

== Release ==
=== Theatrical ===
Boogeyman was released on February 4, 2005, by Screen Gems.

=== Home media ===
The film was released on VHS and DVD by Sony Pictures Home Entertainment on May 31, 2005, with the DVD release being both on UMD and Special Edition. Universal Pictures released the film on DVD in select international territories later that same year. It was later released by Sony Pictures in 2006 and 2010, both times as a double feature, with the first release pairing it with When a Stranger Calls and the second with The Fog. Boogeyman debuted on Blu-ray in the United Kingdom on August 21, 2012, where it was released by Universal. There are currently no plans for an American Blu-ray release.

== Reception ==
=== Box office ===
In its opening weekend, the film ranked at #1, grossing $19,020,655 and nearly equaling its production budget. The film grossed $46,752,382 domestically and $20,440,477 internationally, for a worldwide total of $67,192,859.

=== Critical reception ===
On the review aggregator website Rotten Tomatoes, 11% of 84 critics' reviews are positive, with an average rating of 3.3/10. The website's consensus reads: "The plot is been-there done-that generic, and none of the shock effects can do anything to build up suspense." Metacritic, which uses a weighted average, assigned the film a score of 32 out of 100, based on 19 critics, indicating "generally unfavorable" reviews. Audiences polled by CinemaScore gave the film an average grade of "C−" on an A+ to F scale.

Anita Gates from The New York Times gave the film a negative review, writing, "The filmmakers are smart enough to keep the monster out of sight for a long time and then to show only glimpses, but a similar tactic of providing only glimpses of plot and character is disastrous. Moviegoers never learn who or what the boogeyman is, what his particular beef with Tim is, what his powers are and what has stirred up his wrath after all these years," summarizing, "The house is very creaky, but then so is the movie." Marc Savlov from The Austin Chronicle awarded the film one out of five stars, panning the film's pacing, under-lit sets, computer-generated effects, and overuse of horror clichés. Frank Wilkins from Reel Talk gave the film a negative review, stating, "Although Boogeyman starts out with a stylishly depicted premise that promises a nightmarish ride into terror, after about twenty minutes the movie falls flat with its cheap terror tactics, its abysmal dialogue and its shamelessly tawdry script." Tom Meek from the Boston Phoenix gave the film one and a half out of four stars, saying, "Director Stephen T. Kay knows how to get under your skin, and Watson nails the internal-turmoil bit, but it's still just a one-trick pony that comes up lame long before the insipid climax." Jeremy Wheeler from AllMovie complimented Barry Watson and Emily Deschanel's performances, and promising start, but criticized the design of the film's title monster, and the finale, which he called "ridiculous" and "downright embarrassing". Film critic Leonard Maltin awarded the film a mixed two out of four stars, writing, "Despite its predictable blueprint there are a couple of pretty decent scares to be had here... [though] you might consider chapter-skipping on your DVD to get to the good stuff."

== Sequel ==
A sequel titled Boogeyman 2 was released in 2007.
