= Visions (2015 film) =

- Official poster
- Directed by: Kevin Greutert
- Written by: Lucas Sussman
- Produced by: Jason Blum; Matthew Kaplan; Robyn Marshall; Seth William Meier
- Starring: Isla Fisher; Anson Mount; Gillian Jacobs; Jim Parsons; Joanna Cassidy; Eva Longoria
- Cinematography: Michael Fimognari
- Edited by: Kevin Greutert
- Music by: Anton Sanko
- Production companies: Blumhouse Productions; Chapter One Films
- Distributed by: Universal Pictures (United States); Blumhouse International (International)
- Release dates: August 28, 2015 (Turkey); January 19, 2016 (United States)
- Running time: 82 minutes
- Country: United States
- Language: English
- Box office: $1 million

Visions is a 2015 American supernatural horror film directed and edited by Kevin Greutert. It is written by Lucas Sussman. Jason Blum serves as a producer through his production company Blumhouse Productions. The film stars Isla Fisher, Anson Mount, Gillian Jacobs, Jim Parsons, Joanna Cassidy, and Eva Longoria. It was released by Universal Pictures through video on demand on January 19, 2016, prior to being released through home media formats on February 2, 2016.

== Plot ==
David Maddox consoles his wife Eveleigh as she regains consciousness in a hospital. Eveleigh recalls being in a fatal car accident that killed a child in the other vehicle. A year later, Eveleigh – now three months pregnant – and David prepare to reopen a vineyard they purchased in Paso Robles, California. The area's top wine distributor, Helena Knoll, attends a party thrown for the couple. During the party, Eveleigh finds Helena muttering in a strange trance while alone inside their house.

Eveleigh begins suffering from nightmares and hallucinations and comes to believe something supernatural may be haunting her or the house. She begins attending a yoga class where she makes friends with another pregnant woman named Sadie. Sadie accompanies Eveleigh on a visit to the realtor, Glenn Barry. Glenn reports that the vineyard house has no horrible history, but tells Eveleigh that she may wish to research prior owners – the Porters – for answers regarding possible paranormal activity.

Eveleigh's visions intensify. Worried that her PTSD has returned and is to blame for her hallucinations, David and Eveleigh's OB/GYN Dr. Mathison insist that she resume taking the anti-depressants she previously stopped due to pregnancy. Eveleigh reluctantly relents and the visions finally cease. Several months later, Eveleigh reconnects with Sadie, who convinces Eveleigh to stop taking her medication. Eveleigh's haunting visions return and she also begins suspecting a secret conspiracy against her, with David possibly being involved.

After learning that she has been researching ghosts and poltergeists, Eveleigh contacts Jane Porter. Jane leads Eveleigh back to Helena to ask about the trance she had at the party. Also sensitive to supernatural phenomena, Helena accompanies Eveleigh to the ruins of a destroyed home that previously existed on the vineyard's property. Both women experience a vision. Helena tells Eveleigh that psychic violence can echo throughout time and some kinds of paranormal activity imprinted itself on the land. Helena collapses suddenly. Before dying, Helena says to Eveleigh: "It's not what you think. It's you."

Eveleigh visits vintner Victor Napoli, whose family owned her vineyard a century earlier. Victor tells Eveleigh that his great-grandmother burned down the old house on the property because of paranormal activity. He then shows her sketches from when a medium tried contacting spirits in the home. Eveleigh is shocked to see that the sketches depict her and David.

Eveleigh comes home to an intervention staged by David, Dr. Mathison, Eveleigh's friend Eileen, and family therapist Victoria Lambert. Eveleigh tries explaining that she was not being haunted, but rather having premonitions that also haunted the past. The Porter and Napoli families were experiencing premonitions of a future tragedy that Eveleigh realizes is about to take place that night.

Sadie arrives at the front door with her husband Ben. Both of them are armed with guns. Victoria tries to run, but Ben shoots her. Sadie shoots Dr. Mathison as the room erupts in commotion. Eveleigh realizes that every vision she had was showing her a glimpse of events currently taking place. David discovers Sadie is not actually pregnant when he stabs her stomach. Sadie turns the knife on David and he falls to the floor. Eveleigh pushes Sadie through a glass door and flees. Ben kills Eileen before running after Eveleigh. He then kills a neighboring farmer before confronting Eveleigh, who is then attacked from behind and knocked unconscious.

Eveleigh wakes to find herself being held captive by Ben and Sadie. It is revealed that Sadie is the woman who lost her child in the fatal car wreck. Holding Eveleigh responsible, Sadie plans to cut out Eveleigh's baby. Eveleigh wrestles free of her restraints and slashes Sadie's throat. Ben moves to attack, but David arrives and shoots Ben dead. In the aftermath, the vineyard house stands empty as Glenn shows the property to a new couple.

== Cast ==
- Isla Fisher as Eveleigh Maddox
- Anson Mount as David Maddox
- Gillian Jacobs as Sadie
- Joanna Cassidy as Helena Knoll
- Jim Parsons as Dr. Mathison
- Eva Longoria as Eileen
- Michael Villar as Leo Cottrell
- Bryce Johnson as Ben
- John de Lancie as Victor Napoli
- Annie Tedesco as Victoria Lambert
- Roberto Sanchez as Emilio
- Jeff Branson as Glenn Barry
- Elizabeth Rowin as Betty Sayles

== Production ==
In November 2013, it was announced that Isla Fisher, Ellen Barkin and Jim Parsons had joined the cast of the film, with Kevin Greutert directing the film, from a screenplay by Lucas Sussman, with Jason Blum producing under his Blumhouse Productions banner. In January 2014, it was announced that Anson Mount and Gillian Jacobs had joined the cast of the film, with Jacobs portraying a woman who befriends Fisher's character, while Mount will portray the role of Isla Fisher's character's husband. It was also announced that Matt Kaplan would be executive producing the film. In February 2014, it was announced that Eva Longoria had been cast in the film, portraying the role of a friend who disapproves of Eveleigh's life choices.

== Marketing and release ==
In November 2013, it was announced that Blumhouse International would be handling international sales on the film. It was later announced that Universal Pictures would distribute the film as part of their first look deal with Blumhouse. In August 2015, the first trailer for the film was released. The film was released internationally first in Turkey on August 28, 2015. The film was also released theatrically in Singapore on September 17, 2015. The film grossed $723,348 at the international box office.

=== Critical response ===
Review aggregator Rotten Tomatoes reports a positive score of 19% based on 16 reviews, with an average of 4.4/10.

Boon Chan of The Straits Times gave the film a rating of three out of five stars, stating "It is not quite as gripping as The Gift, but Visions is still worth watching. Sometimes, it pays to play by the book."

== Home media ==
The film was released straight-to-video in Canada on October 27, 2015, and in France on November 25, 2015. The film was released through video on demand in the United States on January 19, 2016, before being released on home media formats on February 2, 2016.
