= Knowing (film) =

2009 film by Alex Proyas

- Theatrical release poster
- Directed by: Alex Proyas
- Screenplay by: Ryne Douglas Pearson; Juliet Snowden; Stiles White
- Story by: Ryne Douglas Pearson
- Produced by: Alex Proyas; Todd Black; Jason Blumenthal; Steve Tisch
- Starring: Nicolas Cage; Rose Byrne; Chandler Canterbury
- Cinematography: Simon Duggan
- Edited by: Richard Learoyd
- Music by: Marco Beltrami
- Production companies: Summit Entertainment; Escape Artists; Mystery Clock Cinema
- Distributed by: Summit Entertainment (United States); Contender Entertainment (United Kingdom); Icon Film Distribution (Australia)
- Release date: March 20, 2009
- Running time: 121 minutes
- Countries: United States; United Kingdom; Australia
- Language: English
- Budget: $50 million
- Box office: $186.5 million

Knowing (stylized as KNOW1NG) is a 2009 science fiction thriller film directed and co-produced by Alex Proyas and starring Nicolas Cage. The film, conceived and co-written by Ryne Douglas Pearson, was originally attached to a number of directors under Columbia Pictures, but it was placed in turnaround and eventually picked up by Escape Artists. Production was financially backed by Summit Entertainment. Knowing was filmed in Docklands Studios Melbourne, Australia, using various locations to represent the film's Boston-area setting. The film centers on the discovery of a strange paper filled with numbers and the possibility that they somehow predict the details of various disasters.

Knowing was released on March 20, 2009, in the United States, while the DVD and Blu-ray media were released on July 7. The film grossed $186.5 million at the worldwide box office, plus $27.7 million with home video sales, against a production budget of $50 million, but was met with mixed-to-negative reviews, with praise for the acting performances, visual style and atmosphere but criticism over some implausibilities and the ending.

== Plot ==
In October 1959, an elementary school in Lexington, Massachusetts, celebrates its opening with a competition in which students draw what they believe will happen in the future. Lucinda Embry fills her paper with numbers while being guided by whispering voices. Her teacher, Miss Taylor, collects the drawing before she can write the final numbers. During the ceremony, Lucinda engraves the remaining numbers into a closet door with her fingernails. The works are stored in a time capsule and opened 50 years later.

In 2009, Lucinda's paper is given to Caleb Koestler, the 9-year-old son of widowed MIT astrophysics professor John Koestler. John discovers that Lucinda's numbers are dates, death tolls, and geographical coordinates of major disasters over the past 50 years, including the Oklahoma City bombing, September 11 attacks, and Hurricane Katrina, as well as three more yet to happen. He visits Miss Taylor who, despite showing signs of Alzheimer's, tells him of the scratching on the door left by Lucinda. The next day, John leaves to pick up his son where he witnesses a plane crash that takes 81 lives and realizes that it was the first future event on the list. John becomes convinced that his family has a significant role in these incidents: his wife died in an earlier event, while Caleb received Lucinda's message. Caleb begins hearing the same whispering voices as Lucinda.

John locates Lucinda's daughter Diana and her granddaughter Abby in New York, where he witnesses a train derailment caused by a faulty siding. He requests their help in preventing the final event. Diana goes with him to Lucinda's abandoned mobile home. They find a copy of Matthäus Merian's engraving of Ezekiel's "chariot vision", in which a great Sun is represented. They also discover that the final two digits of Lucinda's message are not numbers but two reversed letter E's, matching the message left by Lucinda under her bed: "Everyone Else," implying an extinction-level event. Caleb and Abby, who were left asleep in the car, have an encounter with the beings who are the source of the whispers. Diana tells John that her mother had always told her the date she would die.

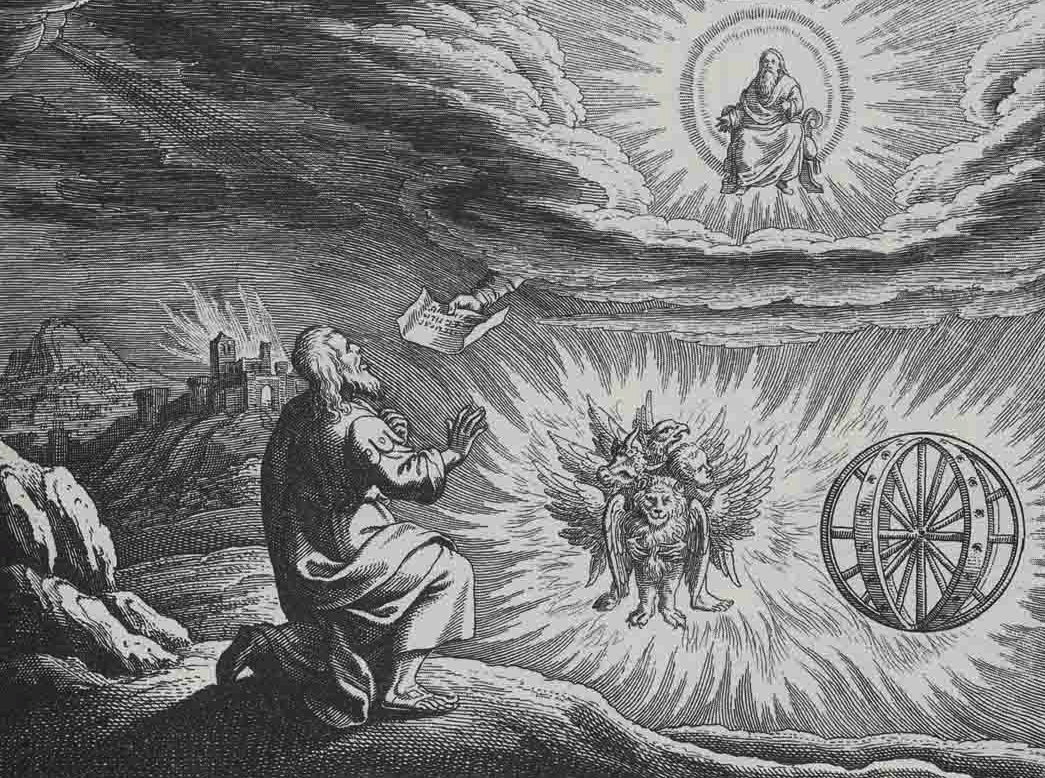
A copy of Matthäus Merian's engraving of Ezekiel's "chariot vision" (1670), which the film's protagonists interpret as an announcement of the end of the world

The next day, Abby colors in the Sun on the engraving, which gives John a revelation. He rushes to the MIT observatory and learns that a massive solar flare with the potential to destroy all life will strike the Earth on the last date indicated by the message. As Diana and Abby prepare to take refuge in nearby caves, John goes to the school and finds the door on which Lucinda engraved the final numbers. He identifies them as coordinates of a place where he believes they may find salvation from the solar flare. After John reveals that the caves will not protect them, the skeptical and now frantic Diana loads Caleb and Abby into her car and flees.

At a gas station, the whispering beings steal Diana's car with Caleb and Abby. Diana pursues them in a stolen SUV but is killed in a crash, dying at midnight on October 19 as Lucinda had predicted. The beings take Caleb and Abby to Lucinda's mobile home, where John encounters them. The beings, acting as extraterrestrial angels, are leading children to safety on interstellar arks. John is told he cannot go with them because he never heard the whispering, so he convinces a grief-stricken Caleb to leave with Abby. The two are taken away and the ark, along with many others, leaves the Earth.

The following morning, John decides to be with his family when the flare strikes and drives to his parents' house, where he reconciles with his estranged father. The solar flare vaporizes New York City, then destroys the Earth. The ark deposits Caleb and Abby on another world resembling an earthly paradise and departs, as do other arks. The two run barefoot through a field towards a large white mysterious tree resembling the tree of life.

== Cast ==
- Nicolas Cage as John Koestler
- Rose Byrne as Diana Wayland
- Chandler Canterbury as Caleb Koestler
  - Joshua Long as Young Caleb Koestler
- Ben Mendelsohn as Phil Beckman
- Lara Robinson as Abby Wayland / Lucinda
- D.G. Maloney as The Stranger
- Nadia Townsend as Grace Koestler
- Angelo Montano as Frank Nicholls
- Alan Hopgood as Reverend Koestler
- Adrienne Pickering as Allison Koestler
- Alethea McGrath as Miss Priscilla Taylor
  - Danielle Carter as 1959 Miss Priscilla Taylor
- Tamara Donnellan as Mrs. Wayland, Lucinda's Mother
- Travis Waite as Mr. Wayland, Lucinda's Father
- Liam Hemsworth as Spencer
- Gareth Yuen as Donald
- Ra Chapman as Jessica
- Terry Camilleri as Cashier
- Benita Collings as Mrs. Koestler, John's Mother
- Blair Venn as Paramedic

== Production ==
=== Development ===
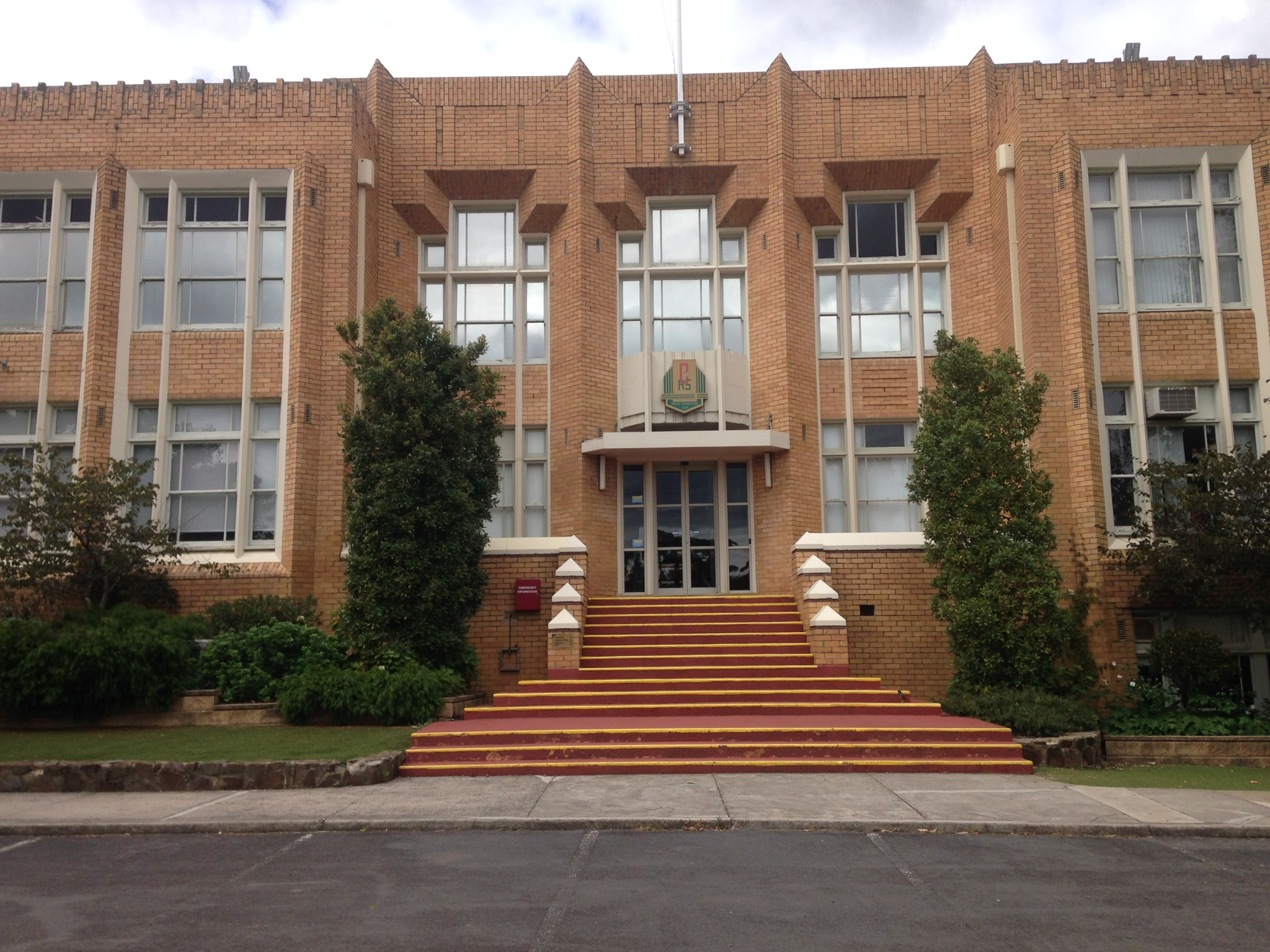
Camberwell High School, a public secondary school in Victoria, was used as the filming location for William Dawes Elementary.

In 2001, novelist Ryne Douglas Pearson approached producers Todd Black and Jason Blumenthal with his idea for a film, where a time capsule from the 1950s is opened revealing fulfilled prophecies, of which the last one ended with 'EE' – "everyone else". The producers liked the concept and bought his script. The project was set up at Columbia Pictures. Both Rod Lurie and Richard Kelly were attached as directors, but the film eventually went into turnaround. The project was picked up by the production company Escape Artists, and the script was rewritten by Stiles White and Juliet Snowden. Director Alex Proyas was attached to direct the project in February 2005. Proyas said the aspect that attracted him the most was the "very different script" and the notion of people seeing the future and "how it [shapes] their lives". Summit Entertainment took on the responsibility to fully finance and distribute the film. Proyas and Stuart Hazeldine rewrote the draft for production, which began on March 25, 2008 in Melbourne, Australia. The director hoped to emulate The Exorcist in melding "realism with a fantastical premise".

=== Filming ===
The film is set primarily in the town of Lexington with some scenes set in the nearby cities of Cambridge and Boston. However, it was shot in Australia, where director Proyas resides. Locations included the Geelong Ring Road; the Melbourne Museum; "Cooinda", a residence in Mount Macedon which was the location for all of the "home and garden" scenes; and Collins Street in Melbourne. Filming also took place at Camberwell High School, which was converted into the fictional William Dawes Elementary, located in 1959 Lexington. Interior shots took place at the Australian Synchrotron to represent an observatory. Filming also took place at the Haystack Observatory in Westford, Massachusetts. In addition to practical locations, filming also took place at the Melbourne Central City Studios in Docklands. The plane crash, which was mostly shown in one take in the film, was done in a nearly-finished freeway outside Melbourne, the Geelong Ring Road, mixing practical effects and pieces of a plane with computer-generated elements. The scenographic rain led to the usage of a new gel for the flames so the fire would not be put out, and semi-permanent make-up to make them last the long shooting hours. The solar flare destruction sequence is set in New York City, showing notable landmarks such as the Metlife Building, Times Square and the Empire State Building being obliterated as the flare spreads across the Earth's surface, destroying everything in its path.

Proyas used a Red One 4K digital camera. He sought to capture a gritty and realistic look to the film, and his approach involved a continuous two-minute scene in which Cage's character sees a plane crash and attempts to rescue passengers. The scene was an arduous task, taking two days to set up and two days to shoot. Proyas explained the goal, "I did that specifically to not let the artifice of visual effects and all the cuts and stuff we can do, get in the way of the emotion of the scene."

=== Music ===
The music for the film was written by Marco Beltrami, but also features classical works such as Symphony No. 7 (Beethoven) – Allegretto, which is played without any accompanying sound effects in the final Boston disaster scene of the film. Beltrami released the soundtrack as a CD with 22 tracks.

== Reception ==
=== Box office ===
Knowing was released in 3,332 theaters in the United States and Canada on March 20, 2009, and grossed US$24,604,751 in its opening weekend, placing first at the box office. According to exit polling, 63% of the audience was 25 years old and up and evenly split between genders. On the weekend of March 17, 2009, Knowing ranked first in the international box office, grossing US$9.8 million at 1,711 theatres in ten markets, including first with US$3.55 million in the United Kingdom. The film had grossed US$80 million in the United States and Canada and US$107 million in other territories for a worldwide total of US$186.5 million, plus US$27.7 million with home video sales, against a production budget of US$50 million.

=== Critical reception ===
On the review aggregator website Rotten Tomatoes, 35% of 182 critics' reviews are positive, with an average rating of 4.8/10. The website's consensus reads: "Knowing has some interesting ideas and a couple good scenes, but it's weighted down by its absurd plot and over-seriousness." Metacritic, which uses a weighted average, assigned the film a score of 41 out of 100, based on 27 critics, indicating "mixed or average" reviews.

A. O. Scott of The New York Times gave the film a negative review and wrote, "If your intention is to make a brooding, hauntingly allegorical terror-thriller, it's probably not a good sign when spectacles of mass death and intimations of planetary destruction are met with hoots and giggles ... The draggy, lurching two hours of Knowing will make you long for the end of the world, even as you worry that there will not be time for all your questions to be answered." In the San Francisco Chronicle, Peter Hartlaub called the film "an excitement for fans of Proyas" and "a surprisingly messy effort". He thought Nicolas Cage "borders on ridiculous here, in part because of a script that gives him little to do but freak out or act depressed".

Writing for The Washington Post, Michael O'Sullivan thought the film was "creepy, at least for the first two-thirds or so, in a moderately satisfying, if predictable, way ... But the narrative corner into which this movie... paints itself is a simultaneously brilliant and exciting one. Well before the film neared its by turns dismal and ditzy conclusion, I found myself knowing—yet hardly able to believe—what was about to happen." Betsy Sharkey of the Los Angeles Times found it to be "moody and sometimes ideologically provocative" and added, "Knowing has its grim moments—and by that I mean the sort of cringe- (or laugh-) inducing lines of dialogue that have haunted disaster films through the ages ... So visually arresting are the images that watching a deconstructing airliner or subway train becomes more mesmerising than horrifying."

Roger Ebert of the Chicago Sun-Times was enthusiastic, rating it four stars out of four and writing, "Knowing is among the best science-fiction films I've seen—frightening, suspenseful, intelligent and, when it needs to be, rather awesome." He continued, "With expert and confident storytelling, Proyas strings together events that keep tension at a high pitch all through the film. Even a few quiet, human moments have something coiling beneath. Pluck this movie, and it vibrates." Ebert later listed it as the sixth best film of 2009.

Peter Bradshaw of The Guardian suggested Knowing was saved by its ending, concluding that "the film sticks to its apocalyptic guns with a spectacular and thoroughly unexpected finish." Philip French's review in The Observer suggested the premise was "intriguing B-feature apocalypse, determinism versus free will stuff" and that the ending has something for everyone: "A chosen few will apparently be swept away by angels to a better place. If you're a Christian fundamentalist who believes that Armageddon is nigh, you'll have a family hug and wake up to be greeted by St Peter at the Pearly Gates. On the other hand, Darwinists will be gratified to see Gaia and her stellar opposite numbers sock it to an unconcerned mankind." Richard von Busack of Metroactive derided the striking similarity between the film and the Arthur C. Clarke novel Childhood's End.

== Accolades ==
The film was nominated at the 8th Visual Effects Society Awards in the category of "Best Single Visual Effect of the Year" for the plane crash sequence.

== Home media ==
Knowing was released on DVD on July 7, 2009, opening in the United States at No. 1 for the week and selling 773,000 DVD units for US$12.5 million in revenue. In total, 1.4 million DVD units were sold in the United States for a US$21.1 million and US$25 million worldwide. From Blu-ray sales, the film also earned US$1.6 million in the United States and a total of US$2.6 million worldwide. The estimated gross for global domestic video sales is US$27.6 million.

== Lawsuit ==
On November 25, 2009, Global Findability filed a patent infringement lawsuit against Summit Entertainment and Escape Artists in the U.S. District Court for the District of Columbia, claiming that a geospatial entity object code was used in the film Knowing which infringed Patent US 7107286 Integrated information processing system for geospatial media. The case was dismissed on January 10, 2011.

== Scientific accuracy ==
Regarding the film's grounding in science, director Alex Proyas said at a press conference: "The science was important. I wanted to make the movie credible. So of course we researched as much as we could and tried to give it as much authenticity as we could".

Several writers criticized the treatment of science in the film. Ian O'Neill of Discovery News criticized the film's solar flare plot line, pointing out that the most powerful solar flares could never incinerate Earthly cities. Erin McCarthy of Popular Mechanics calls attention to the film's confusion of numerology, the occult's study of how numbers like dates of birth influence human affairs, with the ability of science to describe the world mathematically to make predictions about things like weather or create technology like cell phones. Steve Biodrowski of Cinefantastique refers to the film's approach as disappointingly "pseudo-scientific". He writes, "Cage plays an astronomer, and his discussions with a colleague hint that the film may actually grapple with the question of predicting the future, perhaps even offer a plausible theory. Unfortunately, this approach is abandoned as Koestler pursues the disasters, and the film eventually moves into a mystical approach".

Asked about his research for the role, Nicolas Cage stated: "I grew up with a professor, so that was all the research I ever needed". His father, August Coppola, was a professor of comparative literature at California State University, Long Beach.
