= Kevin Greutert =

American film editor

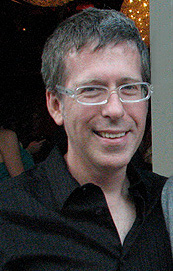
- Greutert in 2010
- Born: March 31, 1965 (age 61); Pasadena, California, U.S.
- Occupations: Film editor, director
- Years active: 1991–present
- Spouse: Elizabeth Rowin
- Website: kevingreutert.com

Kevin Greutert (/ˈɡrɔɪtərt/ GROY-tərt; born March 31, 1965) is an American film editor and director, best known for his work on the Saw film series, as well as character-based supernatural horrors. He is married to actress Elizabeth Rowin.

== Career ==
Greutert was the film editor for The Strangers (2008), Room 6 (2006), and Journey to the End of the Night (2006). He was also the editor of the Saw series for the first five films, as well as the eighth, Jigsaw. He made his feature directorial debut with Saw VI, which was released on October 23, 2009.

Greutert wrote the original story for and was signed on to direct Paranormal Activity 2, but he was forced off the project and onto Saw 3D after Twisted Pictures (production company behind the Saw films) exercised a "contractual clause" in his contract. Tod Williams replaced him as director for Paranormal Activity 2. Saw 3D was released on October 29, 2010.

Greutert has also published fiction in such magazines as Ambit and Magic Realism, and performed music on several film scores, including the Paul Bowles documentary "Things Gone and Things Still Here".

He also directed the horror film Jessabelle for producer Jason Blum and Lionsgate, which was released on November 7, 2014.

Greutert also directed the 2015 horror film Visions, starring Isla Fisher, Anson Mount, Gillian Jacobs, Jim Parsons, and Eva Longoria, also for producer Jason Blum.

Greutert later directed a thriller entitled Jackals, starring Stephen Dorff, Johnathon Schaech, and Deborah Kara Unger, which was released in 2017. He also returned to the Saw franchise by editing the 2017 entry Jigsaw.

Due to a scheduling conflict, Greutert was originally slated to not return to the Saw franchise with Spiral in 2021. This would have been the first time he's not had any involvement in a Saw film since the franchise began in 2004. However, he was brought on late in production to help with editing the final product, and was given an executive producer credit for the installment.

In August 2022, Bloody Disgusting reported that Greutert would return in a directing capacity to the Saw franchise as the director of its tenth film Saw X, which was released on September 29, 2023. Likewise, in February 2024, Greutert was confirmed to be returning again to direct Saw XI, the eleventh film in the series, but development on it had reportedly stalled, due to disagreements between the producers.

== Filmography ==
Director

- Saw VI (2009)
- Saw 3D (2010)
- Jessabelle (2014)
- Visions (2015)
- Jackals (2017)
- Saw X (2023)

Executive producer

- Leatherface (2017)
- Spiral (2021)

Editor

- Saw (2004)
- Saw II (2005)
- Room 6 (2006)
- Saw III (2006)
- The Thirst (2006)
- Journey to the End of the Night (2006)
- Saw IV (2007)
- Saw V (2008)
- The Strangers (2008)
- The Collection (2012)
- Jessabelle (2014)
- Visions (2015)
- Jackals (2017)
- Jigsaw (2017)
- Umma (2022)
- Cobweb (2023)
- Saw X (2023)
- Divinity (2023)
- Day Drinker (2027)

Title designer

- House of the Dead 2 (2005)

Creative consultant

- His House (2020)
- Barbarian (2022)
