= Ouija (2003 film) =

2003 film by Juan Pedro Ortega

Ouija is a 2003 horror film set in Barcelona, Spain. A group of friends play with a Ouija board and make contact with spirits. Produced by Eleven Dreams, S.L.U.
