= Ouija (2014 film) =

2014 film by Stiles White

- Theatrical release poster
- Directed by: Stiles White
- Screenplay by: Juliet Snowden; Stiles White
- Story by: Stiles White
- Based on: Ouija by Hasbro
- Produced by: Michael Bay; Andrew Form; Bradley Fuller; Jason Blum; Bennett Schneir
- Starring: Olivia Cooke; Daren Kagasoff; Douglas Smith; Bianca Santos
- Cinematography: David Emmerichs
- Edited by: Ken Blackwell
- Music by: Anton Sanko
- Production companies: Platinum Dunes; Blumhouse Productions; Hasbro Studios
- Distributed by: Universal Pictures
- Release date: October 24, 2014 (United States)
- Running time: 89 minutes
- Country: United States
- Language: English
- Budget: $5–8 million
- Box office: $103.6 million

Ouija is a 2014 American supernatural horror film. It was directed by Stiles White in his directorial debut. Jason Blum, Michael Bay, Andrew Form, Bradley Fuller, and Bennett Schneir produced it, and Juliet Snowden and White wrote it. They had previously together written The Possession. It stars Olivia Cooke, Daren Kagasoff, Douglas Smith, and Bianca A. Santos as teenagers who have unleashed spirits from a Ouija board. Universal Pictures released Ouija on October 24, 2014.

Despite critics having panned the film, it grossed $103.6 million worldwide on a $5–8 million budget. A prequel directed by Mike Flanagan, titled Ouija: Origin of Evil, was released in 2016, which received more positive reviews.

== Plot ==
Debbie recalls playing Ouija with her best friend Laine as a child. In the present day, she throws her Ouija board into the fire and tells Laine that something strange happened to the board. After Laine leaves, the Ouija board reappears in Debbie's bedroom. Debbie becomes possessed and hangs herself inside her home.

Laine attends Debbie's wake with her boyfriend, Trevor, sister, Sarah, friend, Isabelle, and Debbie's boyfriend, Pete. The five friends meet at Debbie's house and use her Ouija board to try communicating with her. Strange things happen, and a presence smashes Pete's hand and face into a mirror. The friends start finding the phrase "Hi friend" (a message from the Ouija board session) written in various places, such as Isabelle's car and Pete's desk. Thinking Deb is trying to communicate with them, they have another Ouija session and discover that they are actually in contact with a spirit calling itself "DZ." Laine sees the image of a little girl with her mouth sewn shut. The girl warns them to run because her mother is coming. Laine later learns that Deb found the Ouija board in her attic and played alone.

Later, while preparing a bath, Isabelle is possessed and killed. Laine and Pete search Deb's attic and find a box of old photographs that belonged to the previous residents. While researching the previous family's history, they learn of a little girl named Doris Zander who went missing. Doris' sister, Paulina, now an old woman committed to a psychiatric hospital, explains that her mother was a medium and used Doris as a vessel for the dead to speak through. Their mother went mad and sewed Doris' mouth shut, killing her. She tells Laine that there is a secret room in the house where Laine must find Doris' hidden body and unsew her mouth so the girl can banish their mother. The friends go back to the house, where Laine finds Doris' corpse and cuts the stitches on her mouth. Doris' mother's spirit protests, but Doris chases the ghost away. Pete goes back to his house, but is possessed and killed by Doris.

Laine revisits Paulina, realizing that she had been allied with Doris all along and had intentionally lied. Doris is the evil entity, and her mother was trying to stop the friends from summoning her. Laine's grandmother advises the sisters to destroy Doris' body and the Ouija board. Doris' ghost drowns Trevor and captures Sarah, then sews her mouth shut. Laine plays the Ouija board alone to draw the spirit's attention. Doris starts possessing Laine, but before she can take the latter's life, Debbie's ghost appears and helps Laine defeat Doris, keeping her at bay so Sarah and Laine can throw Doris' body and the Ouija board into the furnace, stopping the paranormal activity. Later, Laine finds that the planchette has mysteriously appeared back at her home and looks through it, as the screen cuts to black and the movie ends.

== Cast ==
- Olivia Cooke as Laine Morris
  - Afra Sophia Tully as Young Laine Morris
- Ana Coto as Sarah Morris
  - Izzie Galanti as Young Sarah Morris
- Daren Kagasoff as Trevor
- Bianca Santos as Isabelle
- Douglas Smith as Pete
- Shelley Hennig as Debbie Galardi
  - Claire Beale as young Debbie
- Sierra Heuermann as Doris Zander
  - Sunny May Allison as Young Doris Zander
- Lin Shaye as Paulina "Lina" Zander
- Claudia Katz Minnick as Mother / Alice Zander
- Vivis as Nona
- Robyn Lively as Mrs. Galardi
- Matthew Settle as Anthony Morris

== Production ==
=== Development ===
Ouija began development in May 2008 with Universal Pictures attached. David Berenbaum was hired to write the script, while Michael Bay, Andrew Form, and Bryan Fuller of Platinum Dunes were slated to produce. In October 2010, the studio had set a release date of November 21, 2012. That same month, Adam Horowitz and Edward Kitsis had written a new script, while Sylvain White, Scott Stewart, and Pierre Morel were in talks to direct. The film was described as a "four-quadrant supernatural adventure" akin to The Mummy and Indiana Jones. By December, the studio had passed on all pitches from the aforementioned filmmakers, including John Moore, and were now considering McG and Breck Eisner to direct. The next month, McG was set to direct. In April, Evan Spiliotopoulos was hired for rewrites when Horowitz and Kitsis where tied to other commitments. In June, Simon Kinberg, who previously wrote This Means War for McG, was brought in for further revisions. In August, Universal abandoned Ouija due to its "tentpole level" budget, leading to the film's producers meeting with Paramount Pictures and 20th Century Fox. Kinberg's draft would have cost $125 million to produce. In October, Hasbro Studios opted to restructure the film to accommodate a lower budget. Marti Noxon was hired to rewrite the script, in order to tone down the film's scale and instead craft a "more intimate, atmospheric -- and scary -- movie". Following the project's reconfiguration, McG was no longer involved while Jason Blum of Blumhouse Productions and Universal boarded the film in March 2012. A 2013 release window and a $5 million budget were instated. In July 2012, Juliet Snowden and Stiles White were hired to write a new screenplay with White directing.

=== Pre-production ===
Across December 2013, Olivia Cooke, Douglas Smith, Bianca Santos, Erin Moriarty, Ana Coto, Vivis Colombetti, Daren Kagasoff, and Matthew Settle joined the cast.

=== Filming ===
Principal photography began mid December 2013 in Los Angeles wrapped in January 2014.

Reshoots took place in May 2014 after a poor test screening, which, according to Olivia Cooke, resulted in half the film being re-shot. With the reshoots, Lin Shaye was added to the film to play a newly written character, Erin Moriarty's character was removed from the film entirely, and new plot points were added or changed entirely. The most notable of changes included the character of Doris Zander's physical appearance changing from that of a burnt looking girl to a rotting, decomposing girl with stitches in her mouth. Mike Flanagan contributed ideas to the film prior to reshoots but denied directing the film in any capacity. Flanagan also affirmed the film had a "rough journey to completion" and "a long post-production phase".

== Release ==
=== Theatrical ===
Universal released Ouija in the United States on October 24, 2014. A tie-in novelization for the film by Katharine Turner was released on September 16, 2014.

=== Home media ===
Ouija was released in the US on DVD and Blu-ray on February 3, 2015.

== Reception ==
=== Box office ===
In North America, the film was released to 2,858 theaters and earned $19,875,995 on its opening weekend (including its $911,000 gross on Thursday preview nights and $8.3 million on its opening day). at an average of $7,000 per theater, debuting at number one at the box office ahead of newly released John Wick ($14.2 million). The film played 75% under-25 years old and 61% female on its opening weekend.

Ouija was released in five international markets and earned $1.3 million from 234 screens. The film went to number two in Malaysia ($545,000), number four in Taiwan ($331,000), number two in Singapore ($238,000) and also number four in Poland ($137,000). In its second weekend the film earned $5.7 million from 1,166 screens in 19 territories for a two weekend international total of $7.7 million. It went to number one in the UK, Indonesia and the Philippines. In the UK, the film earned $2.2 million on its opening weekend, which is the second biggest opening weekend for a horror film in 2014 only behind Annabelle ($3.1 million). Ouija made a domestic total of $50,856,010 and $52,618,000 overseas, for a worldwide total of $103,674,010.

=== Critical response ===
On the review aggregator website Rotten Tomatoes, 6% of 89 critics' reviews are positive, with an average rating of 3.2/10. The website's consensus reads: "Slowly, steadily, although no one seems to be moving it in that direction, the Ouija planchette points to NO." Metacritic, which uses a weighted average, assigned the film a score of 38 out of 100, based on 22 critics, indicating "generally unfavorable" reviews. Audiences surveyed by CinemaScore gave the film a "C" grade.

== Novelization ==
The film was novelized by Katharine Turner. The novel was released on September 16, 2014.

== Prequel ==
Throughout January 2015, reports of a sequel were announced. In February 2015, it was confirmed the film was in development and had no release date. Jason Blum stated "We're a ways away ..." In April 2015, it was announced that the sequel would be released on October 21, 2016. Mike Flanagan would direct and co-write the sequel with his Oculus co-writer Jeff Howard. The film would be produced by Michael Bay, Brad Fuller, Andrew Form, Jason Blum, Brian Goldner, and Stephen Davis. Annalise Basso and Kaylee Procter would star in the sequel. It was then announced that Ouija: Origin of Evil would serve as a prequel to the first film. It was released in the United States on October 21, 2016, and unlike its predecessor, it gained far more positive reviews.

== See also ==
- List of ghost films
- Jumanji
- Zathura: A Space Adventure
