= Juliet Snowden =

American film director

- Occupations: Screenwriter, film director and producer
- Years active: 2005-present
- Known for: Writing Knowing and Ouija.
- Spouse: Stiles White

Juliet Snowden is an American screenwriter, film director, and producer, best known for writing Knowing and Ouija. She is known for co-writing screenplays with her husband Stiles White.

== Career ==
In 2014, Snowden wrote the screenplay for the supernatural horror film Ouija along with Stiles White, who also directed the film, based on the Hasbro's board game of the same name. The film was released on October 24, 2014 by Universal Pictures, grossing more than $102 million with a budget of just $5 million.

=== Future projects ===
In June 2015, White and Snowden were hired by Universal to rewrite the untitled Bermuda Triangle film based on the original script by Alfred Gough and Miles Millar.

== Personal life ==
Snowden is married to writer-director Stiles White.

== Filmography ==
Year	Film	Director	Producer	Screenwriter	Notes
2005	Boogeyman			✓	
2006	The Need			✓	Short film
2009	Knowing			✓	
2012	The Possession			✓	
2012	Hollywood Hair	✓	✓		Documentary film
2014	Ouija		✓	✓	Executive producer
