= Anton Sanko =

American film score composer

Anton Sanko is a composer, orchestrator, and music producer born in New York City. He has been writing music for films since 1991.

He scored Ouija for Blumhouse/Universal, Jessabelle for Blumhouse/Lionsgate, and Visions, also for Blumhouse/Universal. He is working on The Naturalist for PBS.

== Life and career ==
Sanko's prominent production credits include producing and writing with Suzanne Vega on Solitude Standing and Days of Open Hand, and producing and writing on Jim Carroll’s last album Pools of Mercury. He has also produced Lucy Kaplansky, Anna Domino and Skeleton Key.

Sanko has composed for many TV series and documentaries, notably the score for Big Love, Masters of Horror, and the epic seven-part global programming television event Great Migrations for National Geographic which aired on the National Geographic Channel in November 2010.

Sanko's first film that he composed was the 1991 HBO TV-movie Women & Men 2. More notable film scores that Sanko is responsible for include the 2012 horror film The Possession, 2013's Nurse 3D, and 2014's Ouija.

He resides in Los Angeles.

== Selected filmography ==
Composer

- Love Always (1996)
- Before Women Had Wings (TV Movie) (1997)
- Strangeland (1998)
- Saving Face (2004)
- Masters of Horror (TV Series) (2006) (1 episode)
- Fab Five: The Texas Cheerleader Scandal (TV Movie) (2008)
- Handsome Harry (2009)
- Big Love (2009-2011)
- Rabbit Hole (2010)
- Great Migrations (TV Mini-series) (2010)
- The Possession (2012)
- Nurse 3D (2013)
- Ouija (2014)
- The Devil's Hand (2014)
- Jessabelle (2014)
- Visions (2015)
- The Drowning (2016)
- Jackals (2017)
- Big Bear (2017)
- The Seagull (2018) - with Nico Muhly
- Amanda (2018)
- Fractured (2019)
- The Half of It (2020)
- The Boy Behind the Door (2020)
- Outside the Law (1920) - rescored in 2021 by Anton Sanko
- The Passengers of the Night (2022)

== Awards ==
- 2009: BMI Film & TV Awards - Winner, BMI Cable Award, for Big Love
- 2011: News & Documentary Emmy Award - Winner, Outstanding Individual Achievement in a Craft: Music and Sound, for Great Migrations
