= Stiles White =

American film director

- Born: Houston, Texas
- Occupations: Special effects artist, television writer, television producer, screenwriter, film producer
- Years active: 2004–present
- Known for: Knowing; Ouija
- Spouse: Juliet Snowden

Stiles White is an American special effects artist, television writer, television producer, screenwriter, film producer, and film director. He is best known for writing the film Knowing, and writing and directing the film Ouija. He is known for co-writing screenplays with his wife, Juliet Snowden.

== Career ==
White began his career as a production assistant for Stan Winston Studios, working on projects ranging from Interview with the Vampire to Galaxy Quest. In 2004, he co-created the short-lived animated television series Da Boom Crew. White made his screenwriting debut co-writing the 2005 horror film Boogeyman with his future spouse, Juliet Snowden. In 2014, White made his directing debut with the supernatural horror film Ouija, based on the Hasbro's board game of same name whose script he once again co-wrote with Snowden. The film was released on October 24, 2014, by Universal Pictures, grossing more than $102 million with a budget of just $5 million.

=== Future projects ===
In June 2015, White and Snowden were hired by Universal to rewrite the untitled Bermuda Triangle film based on the original script by Alfred Gough and Miles Millar.

== Personal life ==
White is married to writer-producer Juliet Snowden.

== Filmography ==
| Year | Film | Director | Screenwriter | Special effects | Notes |
|---|---|---|---|---|---|
| 1994 | Interview with the Vampire | | | ✓ | Production assistant (Stan Winston Studios) |
| 1995 | Congo | | | ✓ | |
| 1996 | The Ghost and the Darkness | | | ✓ | |
| 1997 | The Lost World: Jurassic Park | | | ✓ | Production coordinator |
| 1997 | MouseHunt | | | ✓ | |
| 1998 | Paulie | | | ✓ | |
| 1998 | Small Soldiers | | | ✓ | |
| 1999 | Instinct | | | ✓ | |
| 1999 | Austin Powers: The Spy Who Shagged Me | | | ✓ | |
| 1999 | Lake Placid | | | ✓ | |
| 1999 | Inspector Gadget | | | ✓ | |
| 1999 | The Sixth Sense | | | ✓ | |
| 1999 | Galaxy Quest | | | ✓ | |
| 1997 | The Relic | | | ✓ | |
| 2001 | Jurassic Park III | | | ✓ | |
| 2004 | Da Boom Crew | | ✓ | | TV series, also co-creator |
| 2005 | Boogeyman | | ✓ | | |
| 2005 | The Proud Family Movie | | ✓ | | TV film |
| 2006 | The Need | | ✓ | | Short film |
| 2009 | Knowing | | ✓ | | |
| 2011 | Dead of Nowhere 3D | | ✓ | | Short film |
| 2012 | The Possession | | ✓ | | |
| 2014 | Ouija | ✓ | ✓ | | Directing debut |
