= The Possession =

- Theatrical release poster
- Directed by: Ole Bornedal
- Written by: Juliet Snowden; Stiles White
- Based on: "A Jinx in a Box?" by Leslie Gornstein
- Produced by: Sam Raimi; Robert Tapert; J. R. Young
- Starring: Jeffrey Dean Morgan; Kyra Sedgwick
- Cinematography: Dan Laustsen
- Edited by: Eric L. Beason; Anders Villadsen
- Music by: Anton Sanko
- Production companies: Ghost House Pictures; North Box Productions
- Distributed by: Lionsgate
- Release dates: August 30, 2012 (Hong Kong & Macau); August 31, 2012 (United States)
- Running time: 92 minutes
- Countries: United States; Canada
- Language: English
- Budget: $14 million
- Box office: $82.9 million

The Possession is a 2012 supernatural horror film directed by Ole Bornedal, written by Juliet Snowden and Stiles White, and produced by Sam Raimi, Robert Tapert, and J. R. Young. It stars Jeffrey Dean Morgan, Kyra Sedgwick, Natasha Calis, Grant Show, Madison Davenport, and Matisyahu. The story, based on the 2004 Los Angeles Times article "A Jinx in a Box?" by Leslie Gornstein, is about the allegedly haunted dybbuk box. It’s an international co-production between the United States and Canada.

The film was shot in 2011. Parts of the film were filmed at a former mental institution, Riverview Hospital in Coquitlam, British Columbia. Bornedal cited films such as The Exorcist as an inspiration, praising their subtlety.

It was released in the United States on August 31, 2012, with the film premiering at the Film4 FrightFest, and received mixed reviews from film critics and audiences alike, but was a financial success, grossing $82.9 million against a $14 million budget.

== Plot ==
A middle-aged woman stands in her living room looking at an old wooden box with Hebrew writing on it as a voice whispers from it. She attempts to destroy the box with a hammer, but she is violently assaulted by an unseen force. Her son arrives to find his mother unconscious.

Basketball coach Clyde Brenek and his wife Stephanie are finishing up their divorce to go their separate ways. Their daughters 10-year-old Emily "Em" and teenage Hannah, help Clyde settle into his new home during the weekend. At a yard sale, Em discovers the box. The woman, now bedridden, sees Em holding the box from her window and screams in horror, startling Em. Upon returning home, Clyde finds that the box cannot be opened. That night, she hears whispering coming from the box and manages to open it. She finds a tooth, a dead moth, a wooden figurine, and a ring, which she begins to wear. Em becomes more solitary, and her behavior becomes increasingly disturbed, even becoming possessive over the box. At school, she attacks a classmate when he takes her box, resulting in a meeting with Clyde, Stephanie, the principal, and her teacher. Em's teacher recommends that she spend time away from the box, so it is left in the classroom. That night, curious about the mysterious noises from the box, the teacher tries to open it, but a malevolent force kills her.

Em tells Clyde about an invisible woman who lives in her box who says that Em is "special". Alarmed by this, Clyde attempts to dispose of the box. During their next weekend at Clyde's, Em gets progressively more upset with the disappearance of the box and accuses Clyde of abusing her. Em flees the house and recovers the box. The voice from the box begins conversing with her before seemingly possessing her. Stephanie finds out about the abuse accusations and has a judge prevent the children from being with their father.

Clyde takes the box to a university professor who tells him that it is a dybbuk box that dates back to the early 20th century; it was used to contain a dybbuk, a dislocated spirit as powerful as a demon. Clyde enters Em's room and reads Psalm 91 until an invisible force throws the Tanakh across the room. Clyde then travels to a Hasidic community in Brooklyn and learns that the possession has three main stages; in the third stage, the dybbuk latches onto its human host, becoming one entity with it. The only way to defeat the dybbuk is to lock it back inside the box via a forced ritual. The rabbi Tzadok agrees to accompany Clyde to save his daughter. Upon further examination on the box, Tzadok learns that the dybbuk's name is "Abyzou", or "Taker of Children".

Later that evening, Em attacks her mother with Stephanie's boyfriend Brett suggests that Em be examined by a psychologist. The next morning, Brett prepares to take Em to the psychologist. Em stares malevolently at Brett as his teeth begin falling out, causing him to drive away frantically. She has a seizure on the front lawn and is taken to the hospital for an MRI. During the procedure, Stephanie and Hannah are horrified when they see the dybbuk's face in the MRI scans next to Em's heart. Clyde and Tzadok join the family at the hospital and attempt to conduct an exorcism, which results in a struggle between Clyde and the dybbuk. Clyde survives the attack, but the dybbuk is passed from Em to him. Tzadok performs a successful exorcism; Abyzou emerges from Clyde and crawls back into the box. The family is reunited, with Clyde and Stephanie's love rekindled.

Tzadok drives away with the box in Clyde's vehicle but the car is hit by a truck, killing him. The box lands safely some distance from the wreckage, and Abyzou's whispering is heard from it.

== Cast ==
- Jeffrey Dean Morgan as Clyde Brenek
- Kyra Sedgwick as Stephanie Brenek
- Madison Davenport as Hannah Brenek
- Natasha Calis as Emily Brenek
- Grant Show as Brett
- Matisyahu as Tzadok Shapir
- Jay Brazeau as Professor McMannis
- Quinn Lord as Student
- David Hovan as Rabbi Adan
- Brenda Crichlow as Miss Shandy
- Anna Hagan as Eleanor
- Ella Wade as the Voice of the Dybbuk
- Cameron Sprague as Abyzou

== Production ==
The film was shot in 2011, followed by post-production in July of that year.

Bornedal stated that he was drawn to The Possession's script, having seen it as more of an allegory for divorce than as a true horror film. Actors Sedgwick and Morgan were brought in to play the Breneks; Morgan chose to participate after seeing Calis' audition tape. Parts of the movie were filmed at a former mental institution, Riverview Hospital in Coquitlam, British Columbia.

Jason Haxton, the then-owner of the supposed dybbuk box discussed in the original "A Jinx in a Box?" article on which the film was based, offered to send it to producer Sam Raimi, who was interested yet reluctant. Raimi laughingly told an Entertainment Weekly interviewer, "I didn't want anything to do with it. I'm scared of the thing." He also told the interviewer that he was raised in a Conservative Jewish home: "You don't hear about dybbuks when you go to synagogue. I know the demonic lore of The Exorcist. But what does my faith believe about demonic possession? [...] The stories chilled me to the bone." Jeffrey Dean Morgan felt similarly: "In the research I did, I started getting creeped out. My girlfriend was like, 'Let's just make sure that we don't actually go near the real Dybbuk Box.'"

"We were like, 'Hell, no,'" recalls screenwriter Juliet Snowden. "'We don't want to see it. Don't send us a picture of it.'"

Director Ole Bornedal said, "Some really weird things happened. I've never stood underneath a neon light before that wasn't lit, that all of a sudden exploded. The worst thing was, five days after we wrapped the movie, all the props burned. This storage house in Vancouver burned down to the ground, and the fire department does not know the cause. I'm not a superstitious man, and I would like to say, 'Yeah, it's just a coincidence.'"

== Release ==
=== Critical reception ===
The film received mixed reviews from critics and audiences alike. On Rotten Tomatoes it has a rating of 40% based on reviews from 98 critics, with an average rating of 4.8/10. The site's consensus states, "It may be based on a true story, but that doesn't excuse the way The Possession repeatedly falls back on hoary ghost movie clichés – or the unintentional laughs it provides." On Metacritic, the film holds a score of 45 out of 100, indicating "mixed or average reviews", based on reviews from 26 critics. Audiences polled by Cinemascore gave it a grade B, an above-average for the horror genre.

Roger Ebert of the Chicago Sun-Times gave the film 3 1/2 stars, writing, "The Exorcist has influenced a lot of films, and The Possession is one of the better ones". Richard Roeper also gave the movie a B+.

=== Box office ===
The Possession grossed $49.1 million in domestic market and $33.8 million in other territories. The film ranked #1 in its opening weekend, taking in an estimated $17.7 million, and an estimated $21.3 million for the full Labor Day weekend.

== Skeptical analysis ==
The real dybbuk box is now being held in Zak Bagans' Haunted Museum in Las Vegas. A 2019 article in Skeptical Inquirer concluded that the supposed dybbuk box from the "Jinx" article "is not a Jewish wine cabinet from Spain but instead a minibar from New York." The author believes Kevin Mannis created the dybbuk box story "from whole cloth", and that "This elaborate story that started the entire legend was not an account of real supernatural events, but instead a fictional backstory he came up with to sell an ordinary and incomplete minibar." The article includes a screen capture of a Facebook post made by Kevin Mannis. The post, dated October 24, 2015, states:

I am the original creator of the story of The Dibbuk Box which appeared as one of my Ebay [sic] posts back in 2003. ... How about this – if you or anyone else can find any reference to a Dibbut [sic] Box anywhere in history prior to my Ebay post, I’ll pay you $100,000.00 and tattoo your name on my forehead.
