= Hashiye Ke Log =

- Directed by: Pawan K. Shrivastava
- Screenplay by: Pawan K. Shrivastava
- Story by: Pawan K. Shrivastava
- Produced by: Crowd funding
- Cinematography: Saket Saurabh
- Production companies: Nayaab Vision Entertainment and Rite Thinking
- Country: India
- Language: Hindi

Hashiye Ke Log is an independent film to be produced through crowd funding and Individual Producers. It is going to be the second Directorial film of Pawan K Shrivastava. Hashiye Ke Log is a cinema which tries to capture the marginalized India. This is a story of a man belonging to 'Dalit' community, which forms a major part of India's marginalized millions, showcasing his struggle in standing against oppression and for a dignified life for himself and many others like him. It also takes on the present day growth policy which is majorly exclusionist and has not yielded much for many.

== Genre ==
The genre of the film is Fiction Drama.

== Synopsis ==
Mahatma Gandhi gave a 'Talisman' to use in moments of doubt and confusion. He asked us to recall the face of the poorest, most defenceless, most powerless man we have encountered. Hashiye Ke Log is an attempt to view the process of economic development undertaken by successive governments, during the past two decades-characterized as the period of unprecedented growth rates,'GDP's'-in the light of Gandhi's Talisman. It brings forth the tale of millions who have been suffering social exclusion for ages, and even in free India where justice and equality are the bedrock of governance, they are being subjected to economic exclusion. It questions the exclusionist economic policy as to why bumper GDP's numbers have failed to reach those in the lowest rung. The dream of economic and social justice can be clearly seen crashing as such the Hashiye Ke Log becomes all the more important at this juncture. Moreover, it also an attempt to showcase the life stories of marginalized sections of our society who, unfortunately, have been missing from popular mediums of expression, particularly cinema.

== Crowd funding ==
Crowd funding is a concept which may attract the filmmakers who want to use the culture of philanthropy to make the films without depending on big production houses. This concept has been used by many film directors who want to satisfy their desire for art by making films on ideas in their mind. After successfully making Naya Pata through Crowd Funding now Pawan K Shrivastava is going to make his second film through Crowd Funding.

Pawan has Started the Crowd funding Campaign for Hashiye Ke Log through IndieGoGo a Crowd Funding Platform. The team has also shot an Introductory Video which describes his film Hashiye Ke Log. Recently Pawan Had a Press conference followed by a Panel Discussion on "Presence of Marginalized section in Indian Cinema" at Constitution Club of India, New Delhi, where he launched his Crowd Funding Campaign.

== Production ==
Hashiye Ke Log will be Shot in Chhattisgarh, Bundelkhand and New Delhi. The Project was scheduled to be completed by March 2016.

== Production team ==
- Director - Pawan K. Shrivastava
- DOP - Saket Saurabh
- Executive Producer - Vaibhav Pratap Singh
- Assistant Director - Simranjeet Kaur
- Assistant Director - Prakhar Vihaan
- Assistant Director - Srinjay Thakur
- Assistant Director - Amitesh Prasun
- Assistant Director - Sushil Suryavanshi
- Assistant Camera - Harshit Saini
- Production team - Charles Thomson
- Visual Art and Art Direction - Gopal Shunya
- Sound - Anurag Diwedi
- Production Head - Vaibhav Pratap Singh
- Design and creative- Vikas Rai
- Web and Technology - Ajayendra Urmila Tripathi
- Social Media - Anurag Dixit
- Media - Praveen Yadav
- Content and Research- Neha Rathi and Avinash Pandey
