= Saket Saurabh (cinematographer) =

Indian cinematographer

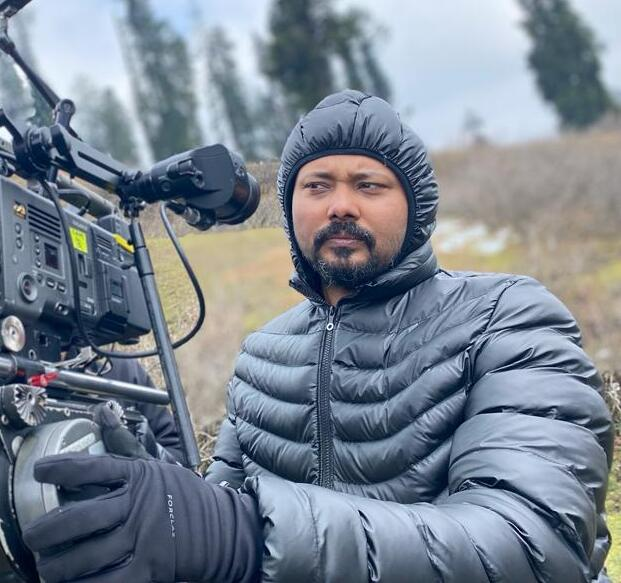
- Occupation: Cinematographer
- Years active: 2013-present
- Website: saketsaurabh.in

Saket Saurabh is an Indian cinematographer. He is mainly known for his credits in Naya Pata, The Lost Behrupiya, Hashiye Ke Log, Saare Jahan Se Acha, The River of Love, among others. His film The Lost Behrupiya won National Film Award for Best Arts/Cultural Film at 61st National Film Awards.

== Career ==
=== As an assistant cinematographer ===
He started his career as an assistant cinematographer for the films like Bhaag Milkha Bhaag, Ki and Ka, Shamitabh, OK Kanmani, Ulidavaru Kandanthe, Sanak, Bad Boy (2023 film) and Urvasivo Rakshasivo.

=== As a cinematographer ===
In the year 2013, he debuted as a cinematographer with the film The Lost Behrupiya and this film won National Film Award for Best Arts/Cultural Film. In 2014, he contributed in the film Naya Pata. Again, he worked in the film Hashiye Ke Log. Then he contributed in the TV series Saare Jahan Se Achha in the year 2018. In the year 2021, he worked in the film The River of Love. His notable works also include are Surveillance, I Am Draupadi, Spring Thunder and the music video Feel The Passion. Two of his films, 2 Kilo and Idi Minnal Pambu, were officially selected and screened at the 20th Tasveer Film Festival in Seattle, the world’s only Oscar-qualifying South Asian film festival.

He is currently working on his upcoming directorial debut Cutting Dead Wood, set in the United States. The script was among the finalists of the Tasveer Film Fund 2025, supported by Netflix.

== Filmography ==
| Year | Movie/TV Series | Notes | Awards and nominations | Ref. |
|---|---|---|---|---|
| 2013 | The Lost Behrupiya | Debut film as a cinematographer | Winner of 61st National Film Awards for best art and cultural film | |
| 2014 | Naya Pata | | | |
| 2014 | Hashiye Ke Log | | | |
| 2016 | Aadha Chand Tum Rakh Lo | | Best Short Film Award of Recognition at Hollywood International Moving Pictures Film Festival | |
| 2018 | Saare Jahan Se Achha | | | |
| 2018 | Spring Thunder | | | |
| 2021 | The River of Love | | Best Indie Film Award at Chicago Indie Film Awards | |
| 2021 | I Am Draupadi | | | |
| 2023 | Surveillance | | | |
| 2025 | 2 Kilo | | Official selection at 20th Tasveer Film Festival, the only Oscar® qualifying south asian film festival in the world | |

=== As an Assistant cinematographer ===
- Bhaag Milkha Bhaag
- Ki and Ka
- Shamitabh
- OK Kanmani
- Footfairy
- Bad Boy
- Ranneeti: Balakot & Beyond
