= Om-Dar-B-Dar =

Om Dar-B-Dar
- Theatrical Poster
- Directed by: Kamal Swaroop
- Written by: Kuku (dialogue)
- Produced by: National Film Development Corporation of India (NFDC)
- Starring: Anita Kanwar; Lalit Tiwari; Aditya Lakhia; Gopi Desai; Manish Gupta
- Cinematography: Ashwin Kaul; Milind Ranade
- Edited by: Ravi Gupta; Priya Krishnaswamy
- Music by: Rajat Dholakia
- Distributed by: PVR Director's Rare
- Release dates: 12 February 1988 (Berlin); 17 January 2014 (India)
- Running time: 101 minutes
- Country: India
- Language: Hindi
- Budget: ₹10 lakh (US$10,000)

Om Dar-B-Dar (Hindi: ओम-दर-ब-दर) is a 1988 Indian Hindi-language postmodernist film directed by Kamal Swaroop and starring Anita Kanwar, Aditya Lakhia and Gopi Desai. The film, about the adventures of a school boy named Om along with his family, is set in Ajmer and Pushkar in Rajasthan, and employs nonlinear narrative and an absurdist story line to satirise mythology, arts, politics and philosophy. The film won the Filmfare Critics Award for Best Movie in 1989.

It was never commercially released in India, though it achieved success in International Film Festivals, including Berlin where it premiered, and it soon became a cult film. In 2013, National Film Development Corporation of India (NFDC) had planned an official national release of a digitally restored print of the film. The film was finally released in Indian theaters after 26 years, on 17 January 2014.

== Synopsis ==
Om-Dar-B-Dar is a portrait of life in Ajmer Rajasthan. The film tells the story of a boy named Om during his carefree adolescence and then its harsh disillusions. It starts as a comedy and ends as a thriller. Om has a rather strange family. His father, Babuji, a government employee, leaves his job so that he can dedicate himself to astrology. Om's older sister, Gayatri, is dating a good-for-nothing. Om studies science but is also attracted to magic and religion. Above all, it seems that his skill is his ability to hold his breath.

== Cast ==
- Anita Kanwar as Phoolkumari
- Gopi Desai as Gayatri
- Lalit Tiwari as Jagdish
- Bhairavchandra Sharma
- Lakshminarayan Shastri as Om's Father
- Ramesh Mathur
- Aditya Lakhia as Om
- Manish Gupta as young Om
- Peter Morris Messe

== Release ==
The film was made on a budget of Rs. 10 lakhs. It had its premiere at the Berlin International Film Festival in 1988, and was played at the film festival circuit and even became a cult film. However, it was never commercially released in India, only as a video release. The film received renewed attention when it was screened at Experimenta, an experimental film festival in Mumbai in 2005. Thereafter, it went into a digital restoration project funded by the National Film Development Corporation of India (NFDC). Eventually, the digitally restored version was released on 17 January 2014, by PVR Cinemas in metro cities.

== Themes ==
The movie was described by its director Kamal Swaroop as a story of Lord Brahma, and it sprouted from the idea that in Hinduism, although Lord Brahma was considered the father of the entire universe, strangely no one ever worshiped him. Swaroop also said that the film's script was written based solely on dreams and images that he had and claimed he "cannot think in words."

== Soundtrack ==
The songs by Swaroop's assistant, Kuku, are sporadic and choppy and don't make any logical sense, and are used tongue-in-cheek to mock the tradition of spontaneous songs and musical numbers in Bollywood cinema, many of which don't do anything to move the story forward, but are instead used as an escapist "break" from the storyline.

== Legacy ==
Although the film was never released or seen in India during its initial rounds at the film festivals, Om-Dar-B-Dar has in the past 30 years gained a huge cult following and fame amongst film critics, scholars, industry insiders and cinephiles alike. One of the first serious articles about the film was written on the film blog The Seventh Art. The blog stated, "Swaroop's film is an antithesis to whatever is recognized globally as Indian cinema – a reason good enough to make Om-Dar-B-Dar a must-see movie" and that the movie can be defined as many things, the most popular of them "the great Indian LSD trip." The film can also be looked at as a jab at mainstream Indian cinema, and many of the themes and images in the film are direct satires of conventions of Bollywood film-making.

Director Imtiaz Ali mentioned the vast amount of influence that the film had on aspiring independent directors in Indian cinema, stating that Om-Dar-B-Dar is "like old wine" and "antiquated because of the 25-year delay in its release".

Director Anurag Kashyap also mentioned in his film blog that in his directorial venture Dev.D, the song "Emotional Attyachar" was inspired in its music and staging from the song "Meri Jaan" in Om-Dar-B-Dar.

Producer Kiran Rao recalled watching the film on a VCD which came with a bad print and poor sound quality, yet being able to somehow stitch the missing bits in her head, which she noted was also a great way to watch a film.

This film has been categorized by Amrit Gangar as a Cinema of Prayoga film.
