= 61st National Film Awards =

2014 Indian film award

- Awarded for: Best of Indian cinema in 2013
- Awarded by: Directorate of Film Festivals
- Presented by: Pranab Mukherjee (President of India)
- Announced on: 16 April 2014
- Presented on: 3 May 2014
- Official website: dff.nic.in

Highlights
- Best Feature Film: Ship of Theseus
- Best Non-Feature Film: Rangbhoomi
- Best Book: Cinema Ga Cinema
- Best Film Critic: Alaka Sahani
- Dadasaheb Phalke Award: Gulzar
- Most awards: Jaatishwar (4)

The 61st National Film Awards ceremony was an event during which the Directorate of Film Festivals of India presented its annual National Film Awards to honour the best films of 2013 in Indian cinema. The ceremony was held on 3 May 2014.

== Selection process ==
The Directorate of Film Festivals invited nominations for the awards on 24 January 2014. The acceptable last date for entries was until 14 February 2014. Feature and Non-Feature Films certified by the Central Board of Film Certification (CBFC) between 1 January 2013, and 31 December 2013, were eligible for the film award categories. Books, critical studies, reviews or articles on cinema published in Indian newspapers, magazines, and journals between 1 January 2013, and 31 December 2013, were eligible for the best writing on cinema section. Entries of dubbed, revised or copied versions of a film or translation, abridgements, edited or annotated works and reprints were ineligible for the awards.

For the Feature and Non-Feature Films sections, films in any Indian language, shot on 16 mm, 35 mm, a wider film gauge or a digital format, and released in cinemas, on video or digital formats for home viewing were eligible. Films were required to be certified as a feature film, a featurette or a Documentary/Newsreel/Non-Fiction by the CBFC.

== Dadasaheb Phalke Award ==
Introduced in 1969, the Dadasaheb Phalke Award is the highest award given to recognise the contributions of film personalities towards the development of Indian cinema and for distinguished contributions to the medium, its growth and promotion. A committee consisting of seven personalities from the Indian film industry was appointed to evaluate the Dadasaheb Phalke award nominations for 2013. Following were the jury members:

- Jury Members

• Adoor Gopalakrishnan
• Amjad Ali Khan
• B. Saroja Devi
• D. Ramanaidu
• Pratibha Prahlad
• Ramesh Sippy
• Sharmistha Mukherjee

For the year 2013, the award was announced on 12 April 2014 to be presented to Gulzar, a veteran poet, lyric writer and film director. He has won five National Film Awards, 20 Filmfare Awards, one Academy Award, one Grammy Award and was also a Padma Bhushan recipient in 2004.

Name of Award	Image	Awardee(s)	Awarded As	Awards
Dadasaheb Phalke Award		Gulzar	Poet, Lyricist and Film director	Swarna Kamal, ₹1 million (US$10,000) and a Shawl

== Feature films ==
A Bengali film, Jaatishwar won the maximum number of awards (4) followed by Telugu film Na Bangaaru Talli, Tamil film Thanga Meenkal and Marathi film Yellow (3 awards each)

=== Jury ===
For the Feature Film section, six committees were formed based on the different geographic regions in India. The two-tier evaluation process included a central committee and five regional committees. The central committee, headed by Saeed Akhtar Mirza, included the heads of each regional committee and five other jury members. At regional level, each committee consisted of one chief and four members. The chief and one non-chief member of each regional committee were selected from outside that geographic region. The table below names the jury members for the central and regional committees:

Central Jury

• Saeed Akhtar Mirza (chairperson)
• M. S. Sathyu	• Manju Borah
• Chitraarth Puran Singh	• Nirad Mohapatra
• Thangar Bachan	• Arunoday Sharma
• Khalid Mohamed	• Utpalendu Chakrabarty
• Pandit Bhajan Sopori	• C. V. Reddy

Northern Region: (Bhojpuri, Dogri, English, Hindi, Punjabi, Rajasthani, Urdu)

• Manju Borah (chair)
• Virendra Saini	• G. S. Bhaskar
• Bhanu Bharti	• Sona Jain

Eastern Region: (Assamese, Bengali, Oriya and North-Eastern dialects)

• M. S. Sathyu (chair)
• Meena Debbarma	• Ranjit Das
• Sreelekha Mukherji	• Beena Paul

Western Region: (Gujarati, Konkani, Marathi)

• Chitraarth Puran Singh (chair)
• Rajat Dholakia	• Meenakshi Shedde
• Rajen Borah	• Tejaswini Pandit

Southern Region I: (Malayalam, Tamil)

• Nirad Mohapatra (chair)
• Unni Vijayan	• Kesari Harvoo
• Priya Krishnaswamy	• Arun Bose

Southern Region II: (Kannada, Telugu)

• Thangar Bachan (chair)
• M. Manu Chakravarthy	• B. S. Lingadevaru
• Joseph Pulinthanath	• Chandra Siddhartha

=== All India Awards ===
==== Golden Lotus Award ====
All the winners are awarded with a Swarna Kamal (Golden Lotus Award), a certificate and a cash prize.

Name of Award	Name of Film(s)	Language	Awardee(s)	Cash prize
Best Feature Film	Ship of Theseus	English, Hindi	Producer: Recyclewala Films Pvt Ltd; Director: Anand Gandhi	₹2.50 lakh (US$2,600)
Best Debut Film of a Director	Fandry	Marathi	Producer: Navalakha Arts and Holy Basil Combine; Director: Nagraj Manjule	₹1.25 lakh (US$1,300)
Best Popular Film Providing Wholesome Entertainment	Bhaag Milkha Bhaag	Hindi	Producer: Viacom 18 Motion Pictures and ROMP Pictures; Director: Rakeysh Omprakash Mehra	₹2.00 lakh (US$2,100)
Best Children's Film	Kaphal	Hindi	Producer: Children's Film Society of India; Director: Batul Mukhtiar	₹1.50 lakh (US$1,600)
Best Direction	Shahid	Hindi	Hansal Mehta	₹2.50 lakh (US$2,600)

==== Silver Lotus Award ====
All the winners were awarded with a Rajat Kamal (Silver Lotus Award), a certificate and a cash prize.

Name of Award	Name of Film(s)	Language(s)	Awardee(s)	Cash prize
Best Feature Film on National Integration	Thalaimuraigal	Tamil	Producer: Company Productions; Director: Balu Mahendra	₹150,000 (US$1,600)
Best Film on Other Social Issues	Tuhya Dharma Koncha	Marathi	Producer: Indian Magic Eye Motion Pictures Pvt Ltd. Director: Satish Manwar	₹150,000 (US$1,600)
Best Film on Environment Conservation/Preservation	Perariyathavar	Malayalam	Producer: Ambalakkara Global Films; Director: Dr. Biju	₹150,000 (US$1,600)
Best Actor	Shahid	Hindi	Rajkumar Rao	₹50,000 (US$520)
Best Actor	Perariyathavar	Malayalam	Suraj Venjaramoodu	₹50,000 (US$520)
Best Actress	Liar's Dice	Hindi	Geetanjali Thapa	₹50,000 (US$520)
Best Supporting Actor	Jolly LLB	Hindi	Saurabh Shukla	₹50,000 (US$520)
Best Supporting Actress	Astu	Marathi	Amruta Subhash	₹50,000 (US$520)
Best Supporting Actress	Ship Of Theseus	English-Hindi	Aida El-Kashef	₹50,000 (US$520)
Best Child Artist	Fandry	Marathi	Somnath Awghade	₹50,000 (US$520)
Best Child Artist	Thanga Meenkal	Tamil	Baby Sadhana	₹50,000 (US$520)
Best Male Playback Singer	Jaatishwar ("E Tumi Kemon Tumi")	Bengali	Rupankar Bagchi	₹50,000 (US$520)
Best Female Playback Singer	Tuhya Dharma Koncha ("Khurkhura")	Marathi	Bela Shende	₹50,000 (US$520)
Best Cinematography	Liar's Dice	Hindi	Rajeev Ravi	₹50,000 (US$520)
Best Screenplay • Screenplay Writer (Original)	December-1	Kannada	P. Sheshadri	₹50,000 (US$520)
Best Screenplay • Screenplay Writer (Adapted)	Prakruti	Kannada	Panchakshari	₹50,000 (US$520)
Best Screenplay • Dialogues	Astu	Marathi	Sumitra Bhave	₹50,000 (US$520)
Best Audiography • Location Sound Recordist	Madras Cafe	Hindi	Nihar Ranjan Samal	₹50,000 (US$520)
Best Audiography • Sound Designer	Madras Cafe	Hindi	Bishwadeep Chatterjee	₹50,000 (US$520)
Best Audiography • Re-recordist of the Final Mixed Track	Swapaanam	Malayalam	D. Yuvaraj	₹50,000 (US$520)
Best Editing	Vallinam	Tamil	V. J. Sabu Joseph	₹50,000 (US$520)
Best Art Direction	Miss Lovely	Hindi	• Ashim Ahluwalia • Tabasheer Zutshi • Parichit Paralkar	₹50,000 (US$520)
Best Costume Design	Jaatishwar	Bengali	Sabarni Das	₹50,000 (US$520)
Best Make-up Artist	Jaatishwar ("for the make-up of the actor Prosenjit.")	Bengali	Vikram Gaikwad	₹50,000 (US$520)
Best Music Direction • Songs	Jaatishwar	Bengali	Kabir Suman	₹50,000 (US$520)
Best Music Direction • Background Score	Na Bangaaru Talli	Telugu	Shantanu Moitra	₹50,000 (US$520)
Best Lyrics	Thanga Meenkal ("Ananda Yaazhai")	Tamil	Na. Muthukumar	₹50,000 (US$520)
Best Special Effects	Jal	Hindi	Intermezzo Studio Alien Sense Films Pvt Ltd	₹50,000 (US$520)
Best Choreography	Bhaag Milkha Bhaag ("Masto Ka Jhoond")	Hindi	Ganesh Acharya	₹50,000 (US$520)
Special Jury Award	Yellow	Marathi	Producer: Viva In En; Director: Mahesh Limaye	₹200,000 (US$2,100)
Special Jury Award	Miss Lovely	Hindi	Producer: Future East Film Pvt Ltd; Director: Ashim Ahluwalia	₹200,000 (US$2,100)
Special Mention	Yellow	Marathi	Gauri Gadgil (Child actor)	Certificate only
Special Mention	Yellow	Marathi	Sanjana Rai (Child actor)	Certificate only
Special Mention	Na Bangaaru Talli	Telugu	Anjali Patil (Actress)	Certificate only

=== Regional Award ===
National Film Awards are also given to the best films in the regional languages of India. Awards for the regional languages are categorised as per their mention in the Eighth schedule of the Constitution of India. Awardees included producers and directors of the film. No films in languages other than those specified in the Schedule VIII of the Constitution were eligible.

Name of Award	Name of Film	Awardee(s)		Cash prize
Name of Award	Name of Film	Producer(s)	Director	Cash prize
Best Feature Film in Assamese	Ajeyo	Shiven Arts	Jahnu Barua	₹100,000 (US$1,000) each
Best Feature Film in Bengali	Bakita Byaktigato	Tripod Entertainment Pvt Ltd	Pradipta Bhattacharyya	₹100,000 (US$1,000) each
Best Feature Film in Hindi	Jolly LLB	Fox Star Studios	Subhash Kapoor	₹100,000 (US$1,000) each
Best Feature Film in Kannada	December-1	Basant Productions	P. Sheshadri	₹100,000 (US$1,000) each
Best Feature Film in Konkani	Baga Beach	Sharvani Productions	Laxmikant Shetgaonkar	₹100,000 (US$1,000) each
Best Feature Film in Malayalam	North 24 Kaatham	Surya Cine Arts	Anil Radhakrishnan Menon	₹100,000 (US$1,000) each
Best Feature Film in Marathi	Aajcha Divas Majha	White Swan Productions	Chandrakant Kulkarni	₹100,000 (US$1,000) each
Best Feature Film in Tamil	Thanga Meenkal	JSK Film Corporation	Ram	₹100,000 (US$1,000) each
Best Feature Film in Telugu	Na Bangaaru Talli	Sun Touch Productions	Rajesh Touchriver	₹100,000 (US$1,000) each

Best Feature Film in Each of the Language Other Than Those Specified In the Schedule VIII of the Constitution

Name of Award	Name of Film	Awardee(s)		Cash prize
Name of Award	Name of Film	Producer	Director	Cash prize
Best Feature Film in English	The Coffin Maker	Shree Narayan Studio	Veena Bakshi	₹100,000 (US$1,000) each
Best Feature Film in Khasi	Ri	Kurbah Films	Pradip Kurbah	₹100,000 (US$1,000) each
Best Feature Film in Sherdukpen	Crossing Bridges	TNT Films Production	Sange Dorjee Thongdok	₹100,000 (US$1,000) each

== Non-Feature Films ==
=== Jury ===
A committee of seven headed by chair Ashoke Viswanathan was appointed to evaluate the Non-Feature Films entries. The jury members were:

• Ashoke Viswanathan (chairperson)
• Bishnu Dev Halder	• S. Manjunathan
• Umesh Aggarwal	• Reena Mohan
• Sandeep Marwah	• Ramesh Asher

=== Golden Lotus Award ===
All winners were awarded with the Swarna Kamal (Golden Lotus Award), a certificate and cash prize.

Name of Award	Name of Film(s)	Language(s)	Awardee(s)	Cash prize
Best Non-Feature Film	Rangbhoomi	Hindi	Producer: Films Division; Director: Kamal Swaroop	₹150,000 (US$1,600)
Best Non-Feature Film Direction	Chidiya Udh	–	Pranjal Dua	₹150,000 (US$1,600)

=== Silver Lotus Award ===
All the winners were awarded with the Rajat Kamal (Silver Lotus Award) and cash prize.

Name of Award	Name of Film(s)	Language(s)	Awardee(s)	Cash prize
Best First Non-Feature Film	Kanyaka	Malayalam	Producer: Satyajit Ray Film and Television Institute; Director: Christo Tomy	₹75,000 (US$780) each
Best Biographical Film / Best Historical Reconstruction Film	The Last Adieu	English	Producer: Films Division; Director: Shabnam Sukhdev	₹50,000 (US$520) each
Best Educational Film	The Quantum Indians	English	Producer: Public Service Broadcasting Trust; Director: Raja Choudhury	₹50,000 (US$520) each
Best Environment Film Including Agriculture	Foresting Life	Hindi-Assamese	Producer: A Media For Social Impact; Director: Aarti Shrivastava	₹50,000 (US$520) each
Best Arts / Cultural Film	The Lost Behrupiya	Hindi	Producer: Holybull Entertainment LLP; Director: Sriram Dalton	₹50,000 (US$520) each
Best Arts / Cultural Film	O Friend, This Waiting!	English-Telugu	Producer: Justin McCarthy; Director: Sandhya Kumar and Justin McCarthy	₹50,000 (US$520) each
Best Promotional Film	Chasing The Rainbow	English	Producer: Edumedia India; Director: Charu Shree Roy	₹50,000 (US$520) each
Best Promotional Film	Kush	Hindi	Producer: Red Carpet Moving Pictures Pvt. Ltd. Director: Shubhashish Bhutiani	₹50,000 (US$520) each
Best Science and Technology Film	The Pad Piper	English	Producer: Akanksha Sood Singh; Director: Akanksha Sood Singh	₹50,000 (US$520)
Best Film on Social Issues	Gulabi Gang	Hindi-Bundelkhandi	Producer: Raintree Films, Piraya Film As and Final Cut for Real Aps; Director: Nishtha Jain	₹50,000 (US$520) each
Best Investigative Film	Katiyabaaz	Hindi-Urdu-English	Producer: Globalistan Films Pvt. Ltd. Director: Deepti Kakkar and Fahad Mustafa	₹50,000 (US$520) each
Best Short Fiction Film	Mandrake ! Mandrake !	Hindi	Producer: FTII; Director: Ruchir Arun	₹50,000 (US$520) each
Best Film on Family Welfare	Heyro Party	Bengali	Producer: Baishakhi Banerjee and Deepak Gawade; Director: Deepak Gawade	₹50,000 (US$520) each
Best Cinematography	Mandrake ! Mandrake !	Hindi	Cameraman: Kavin Jagtiani; Lab: Reliance MediaWorks	₹50,000 (US$520)
Best Audiography	Chidiya Udh	–	Gautam Nair	₹50,000 (US$520)
Best Editing	Gulabi Gang	Hindi-Bundelkhandi	Arjun Gourisaria	₹50,000 (US$520)
Best Music Direction	Yugadrashta	Assamese	Anurag Saikia	₹50,000 (US$520)
Best Narration / Voice Over	Kankee O Saapo	Oriya	Lipika Singh Darai	₹50,000 (US$520)
Special Jury Award	Ananthamurthy – Not A Biography...But A Hypothesis	English	Girish Kasaravalli (Director)	₹100,000 (US$1,000)
Special Jury Award	Tamaash	Kashmiri	Satyanshu Singh and Devanshu Singh (Director)	₹100,000 (US$1,000)
Special Mention	Accsex	English-Hindi	Shweta Ghosh (Director)	Certificate only
Special Mention	Candles In The Wind	Punjabi-Hindi (Director)	Kavita Bahl and Nandan Saxena	Certificate only
Special Mention	Dharmam	Tamil	Madonne M. Ashwin (Director)	Certificate only
Special Mention	At the Cross Roads: Nondon Bagchi Life and Living	English-Bengali	Rajdeep Paul and Sarmistha Maiti (Director)	Certificate only

== Best Writing on Cinema ==
=== Jury ===
A committee of three, headed by Sharad Dutt was appointed to evaluate the nominations for the best writing on Indian cinema. The jury members were as follows:

• Sharad Dutt (chairperson)
• Ganesh Anantharamna	• Balaji Vittal

The Best Writing on Cinema awards are intended to encourage the study and appreciation of cinema as an art form and the dissemination of information and critical appreciation of the medium through books, articles, reviews etc.

=== Golden Lotus Award ===
All the winners were awarded with the Swarna Kamal (Golden Lotus Award), cash prize and a certificate.

Name of Award	Name of Book	Language	Author(s)	Publisher(s)	Cash prize
Best Book on Cinema	Cinema Ga Cinema	Telugu	Nandagopal	Praga India, Hyderabad	₹75,000 (US$780)

Name of Award	Language(s)	Awardee	Cash prize
Best Film Critic	English	Alaka Sahani	₹75,000 (US$780)

== Awards not presented ==
Feature films

- Best Animated Film
- Best Film on Family Welfare
- Best Feature Film in Oriya

Non-feature films

- Best Animation Film
- Best Anthropological / Ethnographic Film
- Best Exploration / Adventure Film (Including sports)
