= Sare Jahan se Accha (disambiguation) =

Sare Jahan se Accha is a patriotic poem in the Urdu language by Muhammad Iqbal.

It may also refer to:

- Sare Jahan se Accha (drawing), a pencil sketch in Ahmednagar, India created in the year 1998 by Pramod Kamble
- Sare Jahan Se Accha (2018 TV series), an Indian web reality series
- Saare Jahan Se Accha (2025 TV series), an Indian spy series developed by Netflix
- "Sare Jahan se Acha", a song by D. Imman and Srinivas, based on the poem, from the 2005 Indian film Aanai
- Sare Jahan se Accha Express, a train running between Chitpur and Ahmedabad in India

== See also ==
- Saare Jahaan Se Mehnga, a 2013 Indian film
