= The Lost Behrupiya =

- Directed by: Sriram Dalton
- Produced by: Megha Sriram Kumar/ Rupesh Sahay
- Starring: Ashraf-Ul-Haque
- Cinematography: Saket Saurabh
- Music by: Vijay Verma
- Production company: Holybull Entertainment LLP
- Release date: 7 June 2017
- Country: India
- Language: Hindi

The Lost Behrupiya is a 2017 film.

The film won the National Film Award for Best Arts/Cultural Film at the 61st National Film Awards along with the English-Telugu film O Friend, This Waiting!.
