= Vishaal Mall =

- Location: Madurai, Tamil Nadu, India
- Coordinates: 9.938108°N 78.136155°E
- Address: Gokhale Rd, Chockikulam, Madurai
- Opened: April, 2012
- Developer: R. Ilankovan, CMD, Vishaal Promoters Pvt Ltd
- Architect: Mayilvahanan
- Num. of stores: 200
- Floor area: 220,000 sq ft (20,000 m^{2})
- Floors: 4
- Website: vishaalmall.com

Vishaal Mall is a shopping mall in the city of Madurai, Tamil Nadu. It is the 20th large format mall in southern Tamil Nadu and the city's first integrated multi-utility mall.

== About the mall ==
The Rs. 75 crores project, which took more than two years to complete, has a gross leasable area of 220,000 square feet (20,000 m^{2}). The mall has a 10,000 square feet (930 m^{2}) play area with games like dashing cars and bowling. It has a 12,000 square feet (1,100 m^{2}) food court, which includes Mary brown. The mall houses department stores, apparel and jewelry shops.

The mall houses has India's first 7D+ experience Theater.

The mall has another Theater with five INOX screens with a total capacity of 1302 (the screens have 166, 178, 350, 318, and 290 seats respectively). It has a parking capacity of about 150 cars.

== See also ==
- List of shopping malls in India
- List of shopping malls in Tamil Nadu
