= PVR Inox Pictures =

Film distribution company in India

PVR Inox Pictures Limited
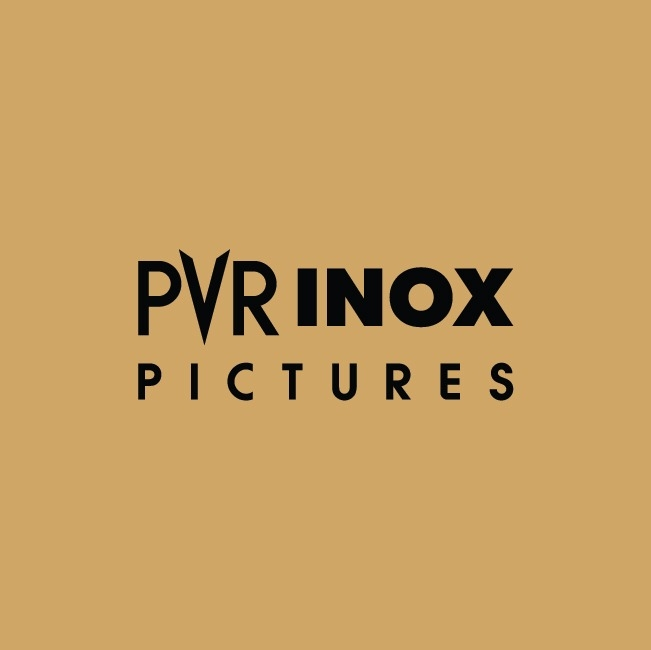
- Type: Division
- Founded: 2002
- Headquarters: Gurgaon, India
- Area served: India & Sri Lanka
- Key people: Ajay Bijli and Sanjeev Kumar Bijli (Joint MDs); Kamal Gianchandani (President); Deepak Sharma (COO); Pavan Jain (Chairman)
- Products: Films
- Parent: PVR INOX
- Website: https://www.pvrcinemas.com

PVR INOX Pictures Limited is the film distribution arm of PVR INOX, which also owns PVR Cinemas and INOX Leisure, two of the largest multiplex companies in India. It was earlier named PVR Pictures, but post the merger with INOX Leisure, it was rebranded as PVR INOX Pictures in 2023.

== History ==
The company has its origin in Priya Cinema in Vasant Vihar in South Delhi, which was bought by the current owner 's father in 1978, who also owned a trucking business, Amritsar Transport Co. In 1988, Bijli took over the running of the cinema hall, which was revamped in 1990, and its success led to the founding PVR Cinemas.

PVR Pictures film production début came in 2007 with Taare Zameen Par and Jaane Tu Ya Jaane Na. It has distributed over 500 Hollywood films, including The Aviator, Mission: Impossible III, Kill Bill: Volume 1 and its sequel Volume 2, The Twilight Saga and Chicago; over 200 Bollywood films, including blockbusters such as Ghajini, Golmaal Returns, All The Best, Don, Sarkar Raj, Omkara and over 100 regional films since its inception. In October 2012 the company acquired the Indian distribution rights for the film adaption of Salman Rushdie's Booker Prize-winning novel Midnight's Children. In July 2023, they released the highly anticipated film Past Lives directed by debutant Celine Song in India, after its world premiere at the Sundance Film Festival.

Its CEO is Kamal Gianchandani, and its current promoters are Ajay Bijli and Sanjeev Kumar Bijli. Ajay Bijli is the managing director of PVR INOX Ltd while Sanjeev Kumar Bijli is the executive director of PVR INOX Ltd.

Recently, the group had a tie-up with HP to open Asia's first Virtual Reality (VR) Lounge at PVR ECX, Mall of India, Noida.

Merger with INOX:

In April 2023, following the merger of PVR Cinemas and INOX Leisure Limited, the company was rebranded as PVR INOX Pictures Limited to reflect the unified identity of the parent organisation, PVR INOX Limited.

The distribution division benefited from the expanded reach of the combined entity, which operates over 1,650+ screens across 350+ locations in India. This increased screen count enabled the company to reach larger and more diverse audiences.

== Films produced ==
Year	Film	Director	Notes
2007	Taare Zameen Par	Aamir Khan	Co-produced with Aamir Khan Productions
2008	Jaane Tu... Ya Jaane Na	Abbas Tyrewala	Co-produced with Aamir Khan Productions
2008	Contract	Ram Gopal Varma	Co-produced with Ace Movie Company
2009	Aloo Chaat	Robbie Grewal	Co-produced with Mirchi Movies, Maverick Productions, and Red Ice Productions
2009	Tum Mile	Kunal Deshmukh	Co-produced with Vishesh Films
2010	Prem Kaa Game	Ashok Kheny	Co-produced with A K K Entertainment
2010	Hide & Seek	Shawn Arranha	
2010	My Friend Ganesha 3	Rajiv S. Ruia	
2010	Lamhaa	Rahul Dholakia	Co-produced with G. S. Entertainment Pvt. Ltd
2010	Aisha	Rajshree Ojha	Co-produced with Anil Kapoor Films Company and MAD Entertainment Ltd.
2010	Action Replayy	Vipul Amrutlal Shah	Co-produced with Hari Om Entertainment and Sunshine Pictures
2011	Teen Thay Bhai	Mrighdeep Lamba	Co-produced with Rakeysh Omprakash Mehra Pictures
2012	Shanghai	Dibakar Banerjee	Co-produced with Dibakar Banerjee Productions
2017	Poorna: Courage Has No Limit	Rahul Bose	Co-produced with Rahul Bose Productions

== Director's Rare ==
The following films were released under PVR Director's Rare Banner.

Year	Film	Director	Language	Studio	Notes
2012	Kshay	Karan Gour	Hindi	Empatheia Films	
2012	Anhe Ghore Da Daan	Gurvinder Singh	Punjabi	National Film Development Corporation of India	
2012	Hansa	Manav Kaul	Hindi	Aranya Films	
2013	Lessons in Forgetting	Unni Vijayan	English	Arowana Studios	
2013	Love in Bombay	Joy Mukherjee	Hindi		The film was originally made in 1971
2013	The Adventures of Sinbad	Shinjan Neogi and Abhishek Panchal	Hindi	Lodi Films Pvt. Ltd.	Animated Film
2013	Mere Haule Dost	Nitin Raghunath	Hindi	Fingerchop Films	
2013	Baandhon	Jahnu Barua	Assamese	ASFFDC	Originally released in 2012 in the state of Assam
2013	The Lunchbox	Ritesh Batra	Hindi	DAR Motion Pictures, UTV Motion Pictures, Dharma Productions, Sikhya Entertainment, NFDC, ROH Films, ASAP Films, Cine Mosaic	Limited engagement.
2013	Shorts	Shlok Sharma, Siddharth Gupt, Anirban Roy, Rohit Pandey, Neeraj Ghaywan	Hindi	PVR Pictures, AKFPL, Tumbhi, The Globe Hunters, Open Cafe Productions Flms, Lemon Tree Films, Om Cine Arts	
2014	Liar's Dice	Geetu Mohandas	Hindi	JAR Pictures	
2014	Station	Saad Khan	Hindi	Sumit Ghosh Media	
2014	Raakh	Aditya Bhattacharya	Hindi	Emotion Picture Company, Saritha Films, Second Image Enterprise	Originally released in 1989
2014	The World Before Her	Nisha Pahuja	English	KinoSmith, Ro*co Films	Canadian Documentary Film originally released in 2012
2014	Oba Nathuwa Oba Ekka	Prasanna Vithanage	Sinhala, Tamil		Sri Lankan film originally released in 2012
2014	The Nut Job	Peter Lepeniotis	English	Red Rover International, ToonBox Entertainment, Gulfstream Pictures	Animated film co-produced by production companies of Canada, the US and South Korea
2014	Naya Pata	Pawan K Shrivastava	Hindi	Vaartul Films, Nayaab Vision Entertainment	produced through Crowd funding
2014	Crossing Bridges	Sange Dorjee Thongdok	Sherdukpen		First feature film in the Sherdukpen Language
2014	Sulemani Keeda	Amit V Masurkar	Hindi	Tulsea Pictures, Mantra/Runaway Entertainment	
2015	Surkhaab	Sanjay Talreja	Hindi	Golden Gate Creations	Indo-Canadian co-production
2015	The Path of Zarathustra	Oorvazi Irani	English	SBI Impresario Pvt. Ltd.	
2017	Newton	Amit V Masurkar	Hindi	Drishyam Films	

== Films distributed ==
Key
†	Denotes films that have not yet been released

=== Hindi ===
Year	Film
2005	Being Cyrus
2007	Bheja Fry
2007	Victoria No. 203: Diamonds Are Forever
2008	Shaurya: It Takes Courage to Make Right... Right
2008	Sarkar Raj
2008	Mere Baap Pehle Aap
2008	Via Darjeeling
2008	Jaane Tu... Ya Jaane Na
2008	Contract
2008	Phoonk
2008	Golmaal Returns
2008	Ghajini
2009	Aloo Chaat
2009	Blue
2009	All the Best: Fun Begins
2009	Tum Mile
2010	Rann
2010	Lamhaa
2010	Antardwand
2010	Soul of Sand
2010	Action Replayy
2010	Khelein Hum Jee Jaan Sey
2011	Men Will Be Men
2012	Chhota Bheem and the Curse of Damyaan
2012	Shanghai
2013	Bandook
2013	Shorts
2013	Mahabharat
2014	Gulabi
2015	Singh Is Bliing
2016	Chauranga
2018	Nanu Ki Jaanu
2018	FryDay
2019	Super 30
2019	Saand Ki Aankh
2019	Mamangam
2021	Sooryavanshi
2021	83
2021	Velle
2022	Jugjugg Jeeyo
2022	HIT: The First Case
2022	Vikrant Rona (Hindi Release Only)
2022	Liger (Hindi Release Only)
2022	Vikram Vedha
2022	Thank God
2022	Uunchai
2022	Drishyam 2
2023	Bholaa
2023	IB71
2023	Akelli
2023	Mission Raniganj
2023	Ganapath
2024	Article 370
2024	Bade Miyan Chote Miyan
2024	Stree 2
2024	Singham Again
2025	Santosh
2025	Sky Force
2025	Mere Husband Ki Biwi
2025	Sister Midnight
2025	Sitaare Zameen Par
2025	Maa
2025	Thama
2025	Haq
2025	De De Pyaar De 2
2025	Dhurandhar
2026	Happy Patel: Khatarnak Jasoos
2026	Tu Yaa Main
2026	Dev.D (Re-release)
2026	Ek Din
2026	Aakhri Sawal
2026	Tera Yaar Hoon Main
2026	Bhai Tera Star Hai
2026	Batwara 1947
2026	Vibe
2026	Nayyi Navelli
2026	Tum Mere Ho
2026	Doosra
2026	Kaali Kheti
2026	Eetha †
2026	Ganesh Dust to Stardust †
2027	Mauja Hi Mauja †
2027	Monster †

=== Telugu ===
Year	Film
2021	A: Ad Infinitum
2022	Godfather
2023	Kushi

=== Tamil ===
Year	Film
2022	Don
2024	Double Tuckerr
2024	Weapon
2024	Raghu Thatha
2025	Aghathiyaa
2026	Jana Nayagan
2026	Sardar 2

=== Kannada ===
Year	Film
2022	Vikrant Rona
2024	My Hero
2026	Lambodhara 2.0

=== Malayalam ===
Year	Film
2026	Chatha Pacha
2026	Bouma

=== Bengali ===
Year	Film
2018	Happy Pill
2018	Kishore Kumar Junior
2023	Pradhan
2023	Bagha Jatin
2023	Jongole Mitin Mashi
2023	Byomkesh O Durgo Rahasya
2024	Chaalchitro: The Frame Fatale
2024	Tekka
2024	Padatik
2024	Babli
2024	Hubba
2024	Surjo
2024	Manikbabur Megh
2024	Mirza: Part 1 - Joker
2024	Oti Uttam
2025	Felubakshi
2025	Dhrubor Aschorjo Jibon
2025	Chhaad - The Terrace
2025	Puratawn
2025	Shreeman v/s Shreemati
2025	Check In Cheque Out
2025	Aarii
2025	Mrigaya: The Hunt
2025	Grihapravesh
2025	Dear Maa
2025	Putulnacher Itikatha
2025	Belaa
2025	Joto Kando Kolkatatei
2025	Lawho Gouranger Naam Re
2026	Vijaynagar'er Hirey
2026	Hok Kolorob
2026	Mon Maaney Na
2026	Korpur
2026	Bibi Payra
2026	Phera
2026	Keu Bole Biplobi Keu Bole Dakat
2026	Saptadingar Guptodhon
2026	Abhhiman
2026	Onekdin Por
2026	Katukutu Buro
2026	Winkle Twinkle
2026	Beporoya
2026	Emperor vs Sarat Chandra
2026	Sadhak Bamakhyapa

=== Marathi ===
Year	Film
2016	Reti
2023	Baipan Bhaari Deva
2025	Devmanus
2026	Tighee
2026	Punha Ekda Sade Made Teen
2027	Amar Prem Katha †

=== Gujarati ===
Year	Film
2015	Gujjubhai the Great
2021	Last Film Show
2024	Interview

=== Japanese ===
Year	Film
2020	Family Romance, LLC
2021	My Hero Academia: World Heroes' Mission
2022	Jujutsu Kaisen 0
2022	One Piece Film: Red
2022	Shin Ultraman
2023	Detective Conan: Black Iron Mystery Train
2023	Detective Conan: Black Iron Submarine
2023	The First Slam Dunk
2023	Rascal Does Not Dream of a Sister Venturing Out
2023	Suzume
2023	That Time I Got Reincarnated as a Slime the Movie: Scarlet Bond
2024	Blue Giant
2024	Blue Lock The Movie: Episode Nagi
2024	City Hunter: Angel Dust
2024	Detective Conan: The Million-dollar Pentagram
2024	Detective Conan vs. Kid the Phantom Thief
2024	Digimon Adventure 02: The Beginning
2024	Haikyu!! The Dumpster Battle
2024	Spy × Family Code: White
2025	Crayon Shin-chan the Movie: Super Hot! The Spicy Kasukabe Dancers
2025	My Hero Academia: You're Next
2025	Jujutsu Kaisen: Hidden Inventory / Premature Death – The Movie
2026	5 Centimeters per Second
2026	ChaO
2026	Doraemon: New Nobita and the Castle of the Undersea Devil
2026	Godzilla Minus Zero
2026	Jujutsu Kaisen: Shibuya Incident / Culling Game – The Movie

=== French ===
Year	Film
2020	On a Magical Night
2022	Notre-Dame on Fire

=== Spanish ===
Year	Film
2010	Broken Embraces
2011	Biutiful
2019	Diego Maradona
2020	Pain and Glory
2025	Emilia Pérez

=== Mandarin ===
Year	Film
2020	The Farewell
2020	The Wild Goose Lake (Wuhan dialect)

=== Thai ===
Year	Film
2024	How to Make Millions Before Grandma Dies

=== English ===
Year	Film
2003	Birthday Girl
2003	Chicago
2003	Confessions of a Dangerous Mind
2003	Kill Bill: Volume 1
2003	My Boss's Daughter
2003	Tadpole
2004	The Butterfly Effect
2004	Duplex
2004	Ella Enchanted
2004	Kill Bill: Volume 2
2004	Laws of Attraction
2005	The Aviator
2005	Finding Neverland
2005	A Good Woman
2005	An Unfinished Life
2006	The Ballad of Jack and Rose
2006	Game 6
2006	Transamerica
2007	Death at a Funeral
2007	Eastern Promises
2007	Hannibal Rising
2007	Next
2008	August Rush
2008	Balls of Fury
2008	Be Kind Rewind
2008	Burn After Reading
2008	Captivity
2008	Code Name: The Cleaner
2008	Dan in Real Life
2008	In Bruges
2008	The Last Lear
2008	Married Life
2008	Miss Pettigrew Lives for a Day
2008	The Other Boleyn Girl
2008	The Strangers
2008	Talk to Me
2009	9
2009	Away We Go
2009	Blindness
2009	Iron Maiden: Flight 666
2009	Taking Woodstock
2009	Twilight
2009	The Twilight Saga: New Moon
2009	What Just Happened
2010	Agora
2010	The American
2010	Bandslam
2010	Edge of Darkness
2010	Love Happens
2010	Red
2010	Remember Me
2010	A Single Man
2010	Step Up 3D
2010	The Twilight Saga: Eclipse
2011	Another Year
2011	The Conspirator
2011	Drive
2011	The Eagle
2011	Fair Game
2011	Flypaper
2011	Jane Eyre
2011	Larry Crowne
2011	London Boulevard
2011	One Day
2011	Rabbit Hole
2011	The Resident
2011	The Rum Diary
2011	Something Borrowed
2011	Somewhere
2011	The Three Musketeers
2011	The Tree of Life
2011	The Twilight Saga: Breaking Dawn – Part 1
2011	The Way Back
2012	Arbitrage
2012	Being Flynn
2012	Bel Ami
2012	A Better Life
2012	Cloud Atlas
2012	The Impossible
2012	The Paperboy
2012	Step Up Revolution
2012	To Rome with Love
2012	The Twilight Saga: Breaking Dawn – Part 2
2012	The Woman in Black
2013	All Is Lost
2013	Broken City
2013	The Collection
2013	Escape Plan
2013	Hyde Park on Hudson
2013	Jobs
2013	Malavita
2013	The Mortal Instruments: City of Bones
2013	Mud
2013	Now You See Me
2013	The Place Beyond the Pines
2013	Prisoners
2013	Riddick
2013	Zero Dark Thirty
2014	12 Years a Slave
2014	American Hustle
2014	Brick Mansions
2014	Closed Circuit
2014	Fading Gigolo
2014	Foxcatcher
2014	Fury
2014	The Hunger Games: Mockingjay – Part 1
2014	Jessabelle
2014	John Wick
2014	Kill the Messenger
2014	Life of Crime
2014	Lone Survivor
2014	Oculus
2014	Pompeii
2014	Tarzan
2014	That Awkward Moment
2014	Two Night Stand
2015	Amy
2015	A Bigger Splash
2015	Black Sea
2015	Cymbeline
2015	Danny Collins
2015	The Gunman
2015	The Imitation Game
2015	Legend
2015	Mr. Holmes
2015	Mr. Turner
2015	Point Break
2015	The Program
2015	Sicario
2015	Truth
2015	The Water Diviner
2015	We Are Your Friends
2015	Youth
2016	Bad Moms
2016	Demolition
2016	Dirty Grandpa
2016	The Divergent Series: Allegiant
2016	Hardcore Henry
2016	The Hateful Eight
2016	Macbeth
2016	The Nice Guys
2016	Now You See Me 2
2016	Pride and Prejudice and Zombies
2016	Room
2016	Trumbo
2017	Atomic Blonde
2017	A Bad Moms Christmas
2017	The Bye Bye Man
2017	The Crucifixion
2017	The Founder
2017	Good Time
2017	John Wick: Chapter 2
2017	Lady Macbeth
2017	Logan Lucky
2017	The Lost City of Z
2017	Mark Felt: The Man Who Brought Down the White House
2017	Miss Sloane
2017	Moonlight
2017	Paddington 2
2017	Suburbicon
2017	Valerian and the City of a Thousand Planets
2017	Wonder
2018	24 Hours to Live
2018	Acts of Violence
2018	Adrift
2018	All the Money in the World
2018	Ben Is Back
2018	The Commuter
2018	Den of Thieves
2018	Destination Wedding
2018	Fahrenheit 11/9
2018	Gotti
2018	The Happytime Murders
2018	Hell Fest
2018	Hereditary
2018	Hostiles
2018	The Mercy
2018	Midnight Sun
2018	The Old Man & the Gun
2018	On Chesil Beach
2018	A Private War
2018	Replicas
2018	Second Act
2018	The Sense of an Ending
2018	Siberia
2018	Sicario: Day of the Soldado
2018	The Strangers: Prey at Night
2018	You Were Never Really Here
2019	21 Bridges
2019	47 Meters Down: Uncaged
2019	After
2019	All the Devil's Men
2019	The Beach Bum
2019	Beast of Burden
2019	Beautiful Boy
2019	Blue Iguana
2019	Book Club
2019	Cold Pursuit
2019	The Current War
2019	Destroyer
2019	Dragged Across Concrete
2019	Dumplin'
2019	Extremely Wicked, Shockingly Evil and Vile
2019	Galveston
2019	Hustlers
2019	John Wick: Chapter 3 – Parabellum
2019	Judy
2019	Kursk
2019	Lizzie
2019	Mia and the White Lion
2019	Midway
2019	Mile 22
2019	Official Secrets
2019	The Operative
2019	The Queen's Corgi
2019	Scary Stories to Tell in the Dark
2019	Teen Spirit
2019	UglyDolls
2019	The Vanishing
2019	Yardie
2020	Countdown
2020	Disturbing the Peace
2020	Force of Nature
2020	The Gentlemen
2020	Greenland
2020	The Informer
2020	The Last Full Measure
2020	Misbehaviour
2020	Mr. Jones
2020	My Spy
2020	Ordinary Love
2020	The Personal History of David Copperfield
2020	The Rental
2020	The Secret Garden
2020	True History of the Kelly Gang
2020	The War with Grandpa
2021	The 355
2021	Breaking News in Yuba County
2021	C'mon C'mon
2021	The Courier
2021	Die in a Gunfight
2021	The Father
2021	The Green Knight
2021	Gunpowder Milkshake
2021	The Mauritanian
2021	Minamata
2021	Stardust
2021	Voyagers
2021	Worth
2022	The Contractor
2022	Copshop
2022	Devotion
2022	First Cow
2022	Memory
2022	Operation Mincemeat
2022	Queenpins
2022	Three Thousand Years of Longing
2023	About My Father
2023	Beau Is Afraid
2023	The Eternal Daughter
2023	Golda
2023	The Hunger Games: The Ballad of Songbirds & Snakes
2023	The Inspection
2023	John Wick: Chapter 4
2023	The Lost King
2023	Marlowe
2023	The Marsh King's Daughter
2023	Maybe I Do
2023	Operation Fortune: Ruse de Guerre
2023	Past Lives
2023	Plane
2023	Priscilla
2023	Retribution
2023	Saw X
2023	Talk to Me
2023	To Catch a Killer
2023	What's Love Got to Do with It?
2024	All Fun and Games
2024	The Apprentice
2024	Arthur the King
2024	The Beekeeper
2024	Borderlands
2024	Civil War
2024	The Crow
2024	Dream Scenario
2024	The Exorcism
2024	Goodrich
2024	Here
2024	Heretic
2024	Imaginary
2024	The Iron Claw
2024	Longlegs
2024	May December
2024	Mothers' Instinct
2024	Never Let Go
2024	One Life
2024	Renaissance: A Film by Beyoncé
2024	The Strangers: Chapter 1
2024	White Bird
2025	Afterburn
2025	Babygirl
2025	Ballerina
2025	Christmas Karma
2025	Conclave
2025	Den of Thieves 2: Pantera
2025	Eternity
2025	Flight Risk
2025	Good Fortune
2025	The Life of Chuck
2025	Locked
2025	The Long Walk
2025	Maria
2025	Now You See Me: Now You Don't
2025	Nuremberg
2025	Presence
2025	Relay
2025	Shadow Force
2025	Small Things like These
2025	Sorry, Baby
2025	The Smashing Machine
2025	The Strangers: Chapter 2
2025	The Toxic Avenger
2025	Warfare
2026	Above the Below
2026	Backrooms
2026	Beware Boiúna
2026	The Drama
2026	The Fix
2026	The Furious
2026	Fuze
2026	Greenland 2: Migration
2026	Hokum
2026	The Housemaid
2026	The Hunger Games: Sunrise on the Reaping
2026	I Play Rocky
2026	I Want Your Sex
2026	The Invite
2026	It Ends
2026	The Magic Faraway Tree
2026	Marty Supreme
2026	Mutiny
2026	Normal
2026	Onslaught
2026	Paper Tiger
2026	Primetime
2026	Shelter
2026	The Strangers: Chapter 3
2026	A Talent for Murder
2026	Tony
2026	Tuner
2026	The Uprising
2026	Wildwood
2027	Artificial
TBA	4 x 4: The Event
TBA	4 Kids Walk Into a Bank
TBA	Art
TBA	Asymmetry
TBA	Bitcoin
TBA	Famous
TBA	The Housewife
TBA	Last Dance
TBA	The Passenger
TBA	The Riders
TBA	Wife & Dog
TBA	The Young People

== See also ==
- PVR INOX
- Ajay Bijli
