= Pramod Kamble =

Indian painter and sculptor from Maharashtra

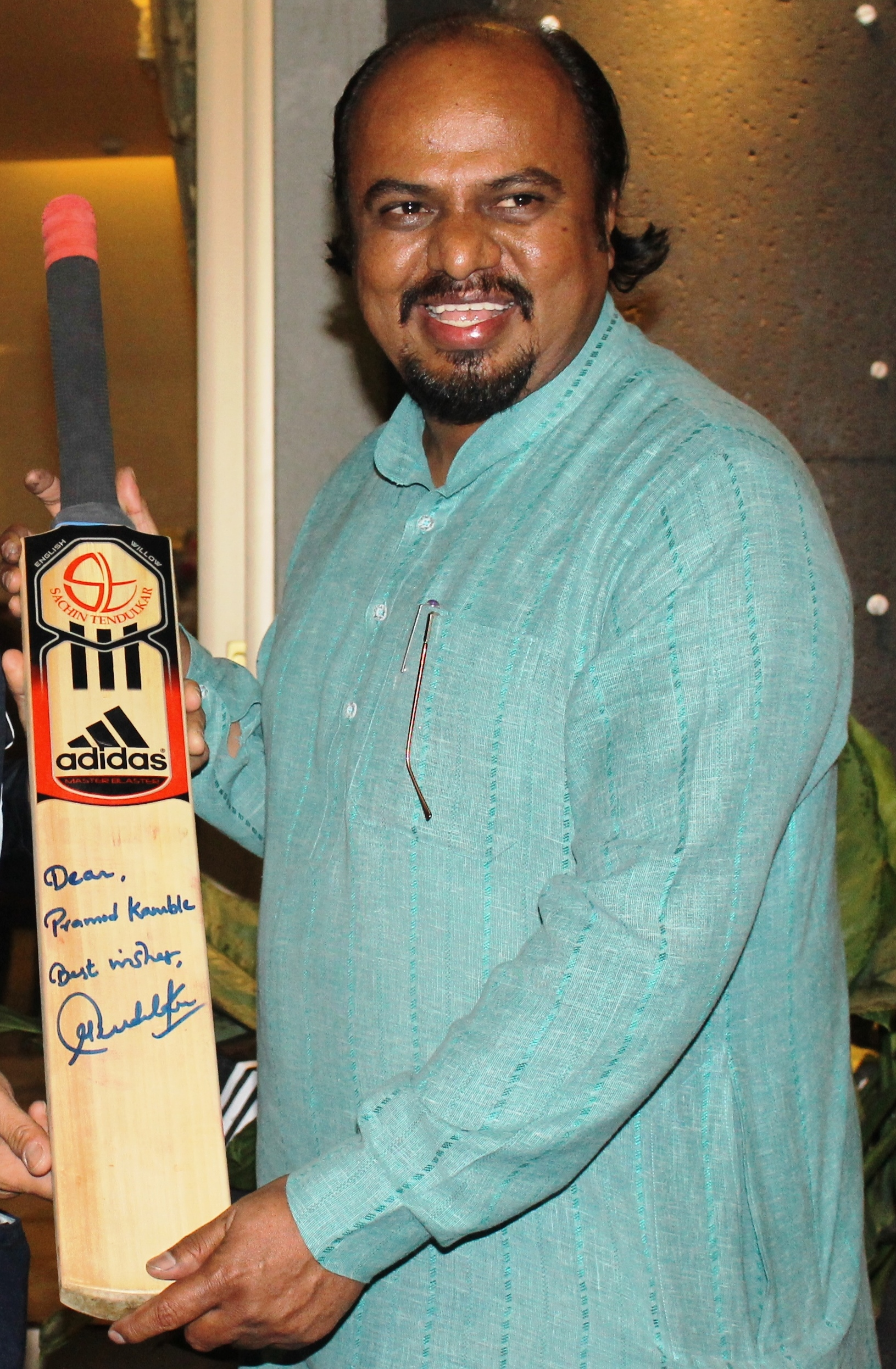
- Kamble in 2013
- Born: 11 August 1964 (age 61)
- Known for: Artist
- Website: www.pramodkamble.com

Pramod Kamble (born 11 August 1964) is an Indian artist, painter, and sculptor. He promotes eco-friendly idols with NGOs creating Ganapatis made of clay and painted in natural colours for a safer festival. He conducts classes on making such eco-friendly idols during Ganesh Chaturthi.

== Early life ==
Kamble was born in 1964 into a family of artists. His father was a known watercolour artist and the principal of an art institute. He won the National Talent Scholarship for sculpture in the 7th standard of his school. He did his Foundation course and Art Teacher Diploma in Pragat Kala Mahavidyalaya, Ahmednagar, before joining Sir JJ School of Arts, Mumbai.

== Career ==
=== Notable portraits, creative paintings and sculptures ===
- Demonstration of a 6 ft. clay panel of Belur Krishna to the Russian delegates who visited his college. Theme monuments of scientists viz. Albert Einstein, Newton, Darwin, and Aryabhatt in a residential project in Pune. Ten huge sets which comprise paintings and sculptures of majestic size on the life of Swami Narayan at the Swami Narayan temple in Baroda.
- Sculptures of 52 life-size models of wild animals have been put up on a permanent Installation in Madhya Pradesh, Pune, Mumbai, Nasik etc.
- 'The Spirit'- A pencil drawing on the wall of dimension 90 ft. by 10 ft. depicting a brief history of the evolution of Mechanised Infantry Regimental Centre (MIRC), the theme trophy cast in silver for the Silver Jubilee celebrations (MIRC), and the prestigious War Memorial (MIRC).
- 1:5 scaled model of Abhay tank for Vehicle Research Development and Establishment (VRDE), Charger at ACC&S.
- Wild animal sculptures for West Indies
- A 70-feet-tall statue of Sai Baba at the prasadalay in Shirdi.
- He installed a sculpture of a lion's head at Sachin Tendulkar's house.

=== Donations by sketching ===
During calamities, he has collected donations from people by sketching them on the streets of Ahmednagar and donating the proceeds to relief funds for the Latur earthquake, Gujarat earthquake, and Kargil War respectively.

=== Save the environment initiative ===
He encourages the idea of a clay idol to be installed in every house during the Ganapati festival and conducts workshops for making clay Ganapati idols. He promotes idols of clay instead of Plaster of Paris, which are not easy to dissolve in water. He has taken many workshops in the schools and colleges of Ahmednagar. In Mumbai, since the height of Ganesh idols is high, he suggests using fibreglass idols instead of plaster of Paris. His wife Swati, supports him in this initiative.

=== Sare Jahan Se Achcha Project ===
A large pencil drawing "Sare Jahan Se Achcha" – 70 ft. by 20 ft. in dimension was drawn by Kamble. The project started in the year 1996 and was completed on the eve of Independence of 1997. It commemorates the Nation on the occasion of 50 years of Independence on the specially prepared wall of Mahavir Art Gallery in Ahmednagar. This drawing portrays Bharat Mata and almost 500 notable people including sages, deities, freedom fighters, Bharat Ratna awardees, Dadasaheb Phalke awardees, GyanPeeth awardees, Param Vir Chakra recipients and the masters in various fields of life that includes sports-persons, musicians, dancers, painters, theatre personalities, singers, social activists and industrialists.

== Awards and achievements ==
- Maharashtra State Award for Painting- 1979–80
- Maharashtra State Award for Sculpture- 1981
- 1st Award for J.J. School of Art Annual Exhibition- 1981–82
- Special Award for Art Society of India for Sculpture- 1983
- Advocate Club of Mumbai, Award for Calligraphy- 1983
- CEAD Award for Calligraphy- 1983
- Logo Design Award- 1984
- Maharashtra State Award for Painting- 1984
- Portrait Painting Award from Bombay Art Society- 1984
- Special Award for Sculpture in J.J. School of Art Annual Art Exhibition- 1984
- Ashok Jain award for Pencil Drawing- 1984
- Maharashtra State Award for Drawing- 1986
- CEAD Organised Art Exhibition Social Service Campaign Award- 1990
- Rotary Club of Ahmednagar - Lifetime Achievement Award For "Sare Jahan Se Achha" Project- 1999
- Felicitation From Indian Army Regiment MIRC for Sculpting the War Memorial and Silver Jubilee Trophy- 2005
- Savedi Bhusan Award- 2005
- Mahatma Phule Lifetime Achievement Award- 2010
- Kala Gaurav Puraskar in 2011
- Shilpgaurav Puraskar– 2013 in Pune by B.R. Khedkar Pratishtan, Pune
- Govt. of India Scholarship CCRT for Sculpture
- Bombay Art Society, Art Society of India awards
- Awards in the Applied Art Category in the Theme Communicating National Integration
- Kalagaurav Puraskar

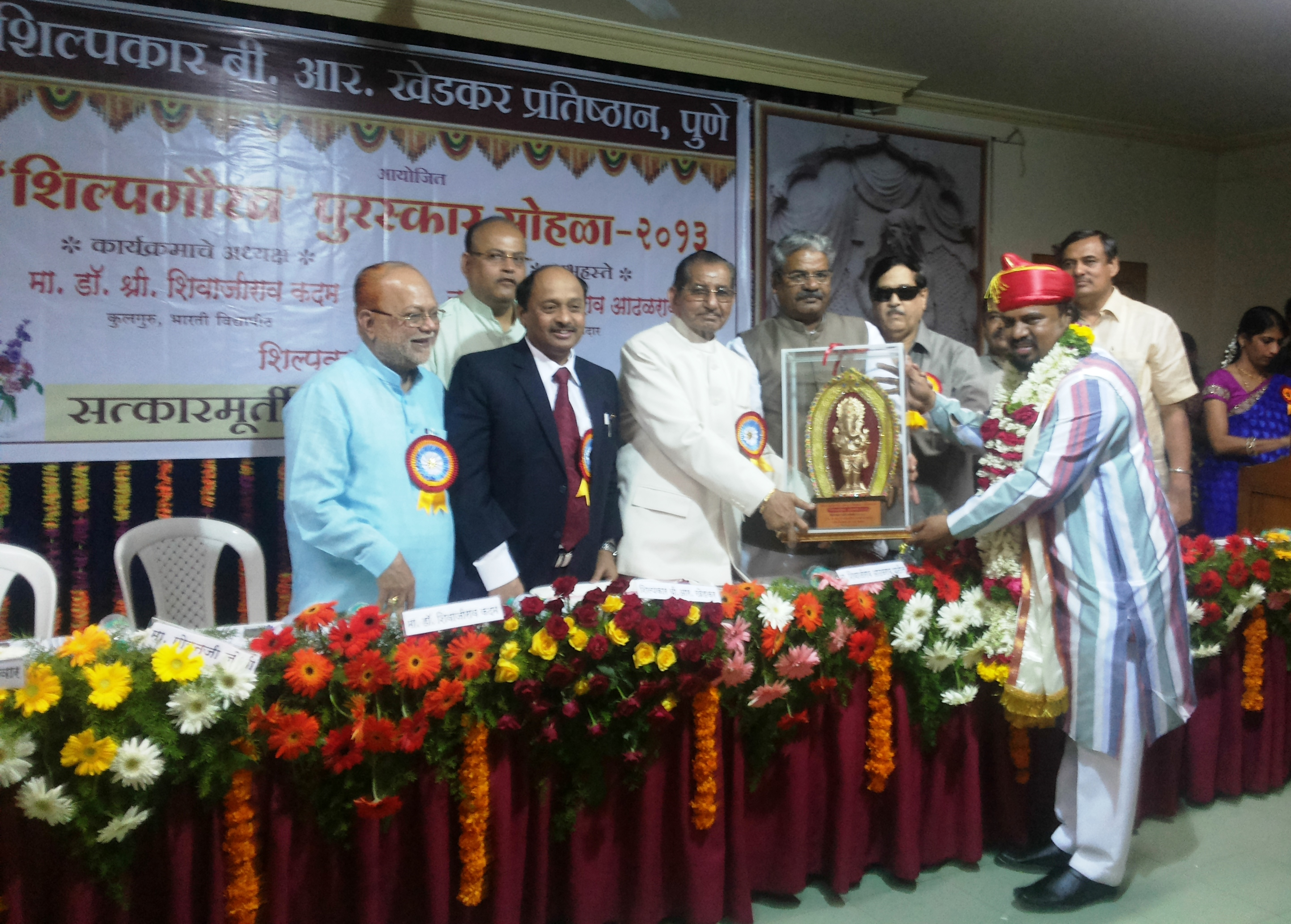
Shilpgaurav Puraskar – 2013 was awarded to Pramod Kamble

== Works ==
=== Sculpture ===
- Shivaji
- Various sculptures in Ahmednagar city
- works on Ram mandir ayodya.

=== Works on wall ===
- Sare Jahan Se Achcha containing sketches of 500 renounced personalities of India
- A pencil drawing on a wall in the central hall of the Alpha Mess at the Mechanised Infantry Regimental Center (MIRC), Ahmednagar

=== Other projects ===
- Eco-friendly idols during the Ganesh festival
