= Onekdin Por =

2026 Indian Bengali film

- Official poster
- Directed by: Saurav Palodhi
- Screenplay by: Saurav Palodhi; Deep Bhattacharya; Sambeet Roy; Debiprosad Dutta
- Produced by: Prosenjit Chatterjee
- Starring: Chitrangada Satarupa; Bimal Giri; Shankar Debnath
- Music by: Saptak Sanai Das
- Production company: Nideas Productions
- Distributed by: PVR Inox Pictures
- Release date: 26 June 2026
- Country: India
- Language: Bengali

Onekdin Por (lit. 'After a long time'; English title: Need to Belong) is a 2026 Indian Bengali-language drama film directed by Saurav Palodhi and presented by Prosenjit Chatterjee. The film stars Chitrangada Satarupa, Bimal Giri, and Shankar Debnath in lead roles. It was produced under the banner Nideas Productions. It is Palodhi's second directorial feature after Onko Ki Kothin.

== Plot ==
Mallika, a young carer, lives with her alcoholic father on the outskirts of Kolkata and her mother, who alternates between bitterly arguing and tenderly reconciling and relying heavily on her daughter. Every day, she takes a bus to work and then cycles to an ancestral house belonging to Biswanath, a retired professor and widower whose son has moved abroad. Rather than living out his days in silent solitude following the death of his wife, Biswanath has opened up his home to other elderly people who have come to him in search of companionship. His lifelong companion Ashish lives there with his wife Nibha, along with Paritosh and the housemaid Maya, who have come to take care of the retired professor. Many of them have children abroad who rarely contact them, while one worldly flirty woman falls for Biswanath, who enjoys the attention.

On her way to the house, Mallika gets to know Sayak, a divorced father, whose only remaining bond is his daughter Teesta, who lives with her mother. They strike up a friendship on the bus and over tea at a roadside stall run by Shibuda, whose partner Barsha is deaf and mute. Mallika learns to communicate through sign language from Barsha, which Sayak eventually persuades her to use in reciprocation of his feelings. Meanwhile, Shibuda and Barsha got together, with flashbacks to a young Mallika’s father, who was smitten with a younger Maya.

The son of Biswanath arrives to visit his father from overseas, but the two men do not face each other directly. They sit with their backs to each other, their chairs at an angle, as their son accuses his father of being a “logistical father,” someone who provided food and clothing but no love, claiming that he makes a far more caring parent to his own child.

Nevertheless, the two men are united in their love for the wife and mother who has passed away. Later, the film highlights the emptiness of the children who live abroad, as well as the irony of Ashish’s visits with his own offspring. Toward the end, everything comes full circle, with the individuals finding some form of a meaningful conclusion to their experiences, albeit not necessarily a happy one.

== Cast ==
- Chitrangada Satarupa as Mallika
- Bimal Giri as Sayak
- Shankar Debnath as Biswanath
- Biplab Bandyopadhyay as Ashish
- Seema Mukhopadhyay as Nibha
- Bimal Chakraborty as Paritosh
- Sanjita as Maya
- Senjuti Mukherjee
- Debesh Roy Chowdhury as Mallika's father
- Suparna Das as Barsha
- Doriyaa Das Palodhi

== Production ==
=== Development ===
Onekdin Por was announced by Prosenjit Chatterjee's Nideas Productions as Palodhi's first collaboration with the banner. Palodhi wrote the story and screenplay with Soumit Deb, who described it as "a story of social bonding" in which "the way the politics of society is entangled with it will also come up", saying the idea had been on Palodhi's mind for a long time before the two developed it together. Palodhi said the film would tell a love story across age and social divides.

Chitrangada Satarupa was cast after seeing her in Colour Blind, a play she'd performed in, though he'd never seen any of her films. The film's ensemble of theatre veterans was attributed to Palodhi's background with Icchhemoto, a Kolkata theatre group he'd founded. The casting was reported as a rejection of commercial casting patterns.

=== Filming ===
Shooting began on November 2025. The cinematography was handled by Ankit Sengupta and the editing by Pranay Dasgupta. Lead actress Chitrangada Satarupa shot for the film while pregnant. The film was produced by Prosenjit Chatterjee under Nideas Productions, which previously backed Goutam Ghose's Shankachil and Kaushik Ganguly's Jyeshthoputro. Palodhi said producers were rarely willing to back films of this kind and that he was "privileged" to have access to Prosenjit, adding that a presenter of Prosenjit's stature helps such films reach audiences, as had happened with Dostojee.

== Marketing ==
The film was announced on social media by Nideas Productions, the first poster of which bore the tagline "Tike Thakte Ekta Purpose Lage" ("To survive, one needs a purpose"). The official poster was unveiled by Prosenjit Chatterjee and a cryptic post announced the project. The film is themed around the unspoken bond between parents and children as well as aging and loneliness. The official teaser was released in June 2026. Ahead of the release, Palodhi said he was not worried about the film opening alongside a major Bengali release during the FIFA World Cup season, saying he did not believe that one film dies for another and that audiences would watch both.

Ahead of the release, Prosenjit Chatterjee and Palodhi invited veteran leader Biman Bose to a special screening as well as Samik Bhattacharya to a screening. At the release event, Prosenjit called Onekdin Por a group effort in which Palodhi and his team had worked "from the heart", and said that the film's story, rather than its cast, was its star.

== Release ==
The film was released in theatres on 26 June 2026, three days after the release of Abhimaan, in which Prosenjit also starred.

== Reception ==
The Telegraph's Agnivo Niyogi praised the film as a tender drama that "takes its time to explore loneliness, grief and the quiet comfort of human connection", writing that it "refuses to box love into categories" and exists in friendship, caregiving, and shared grief. He called Chitrangada Satarupa the film's "emotional anchor" and found Bimal Giri equally impressive, while noting that the first half lingers longer than necessary and that some emotional threads are deliberately left open. The Times of India gave the film 4 out of 5 stars, calling it "a bittersweet celebration of love in all its imperfect forms" and observing that despite its deeply emotional themes it "does not slip into melodrama", with humour and everyday banter providing warmth. The review singled out Saptak Sanai Das's "understated score" and the natural chemistry between the leads, while identifying the "slow and somewhat complex opening" as the film's only drawback.

Indulge Express described it as "a heart-touching story about the many hues of love", writing that Palodhi "has yet again achieved what he does best: find extraordinary stories in ordinary, everyday life". The review praised the ensemble cast and the nostalgia-evoking music, and argued that although the film "might feel slow at some points... that is perhaps the point", since "our stories do not necessarily have perfect endings".

The Statesman was more mixed, finding the film "somewhat of a disappointment" in comparison to Palodhi's debut Onko Ki Kothin, and criticising the script's subplots for having "neither beginning, nor middle, nor end" as well as a "superfluous" flashback and flat songs. It nonetheless credited the director with assembling "a very talented crowd of theatre veterans" whose spontaneous performances enriched every frame, and praised Chitrangada Satarupa, Bimal Giri, and Suparna Das, while congratulating Prosenjit Chatterjee for backing a young director. Prosenjit Chatterjee also spoke about the growth of regional cinema across India in relation to the film.
