= Sriram Dalton =

Indian film director

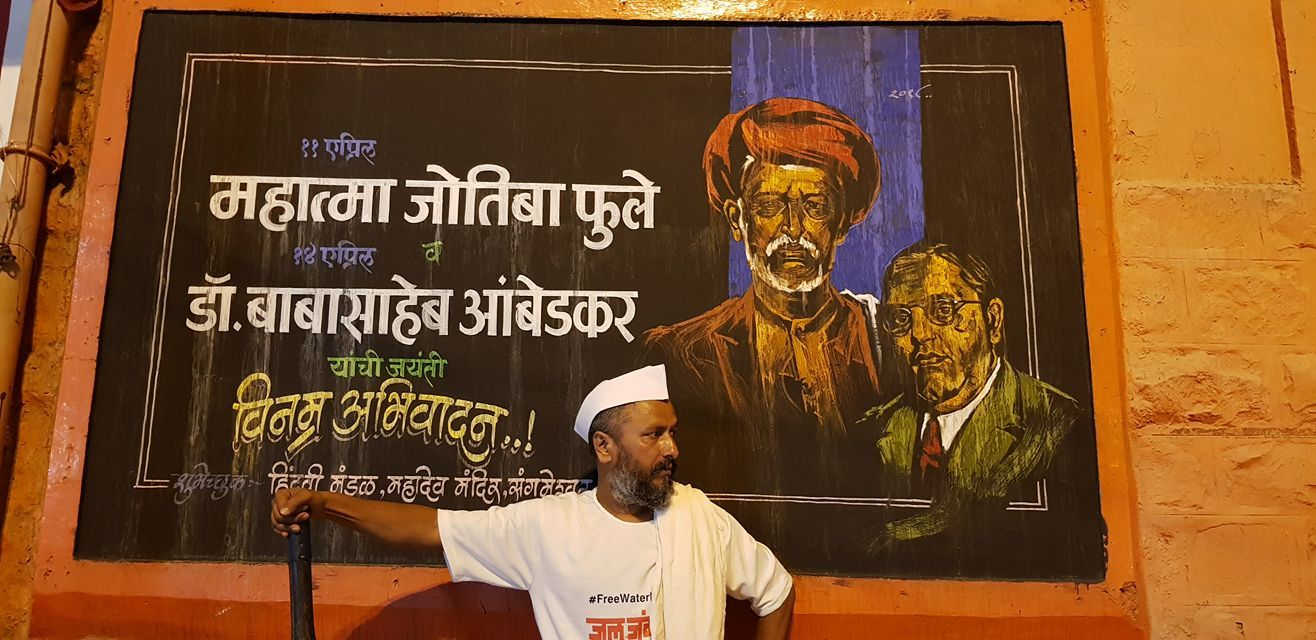
- Sriram Dalton during Free India Water Movement
- Born: 25 August 1979 (age 47); Bihar, India
- Occupations: Director, producer, editor-in-chief, writer
- Years active: 2012 – Present
- Spouse: Megha Sriram Dalton
- Parent(s): Rajeshwar Singh; Indra Devi

Sriram Dalton (born 25 August 1979) is an Indian film producer and director who works in Bollywood. He won the Rajat Kamal award at the 61st National Film Awards.

== Filmography ==
- OP Stop Smelling your Socks (2010)
- The Lost Behrupiya (Won the Best Film Award in Art and Culture at 61st National Film Awards)
- Spring Thunder

== Non film work ==
In 2018, Sriram started an initiative "Jal Jungle Zamin Humara Hain" for spreading awareness about dying rivers of India with the idea of "Free India Water" Dalton started a walk from Mumbai on 15 May along with supporters. Walks 82 days from Mumbai to Jharkhand, highlighting the issue of commercialization of water and people's rights on land, water and forest.
