= Ashutosh Pattnaik =

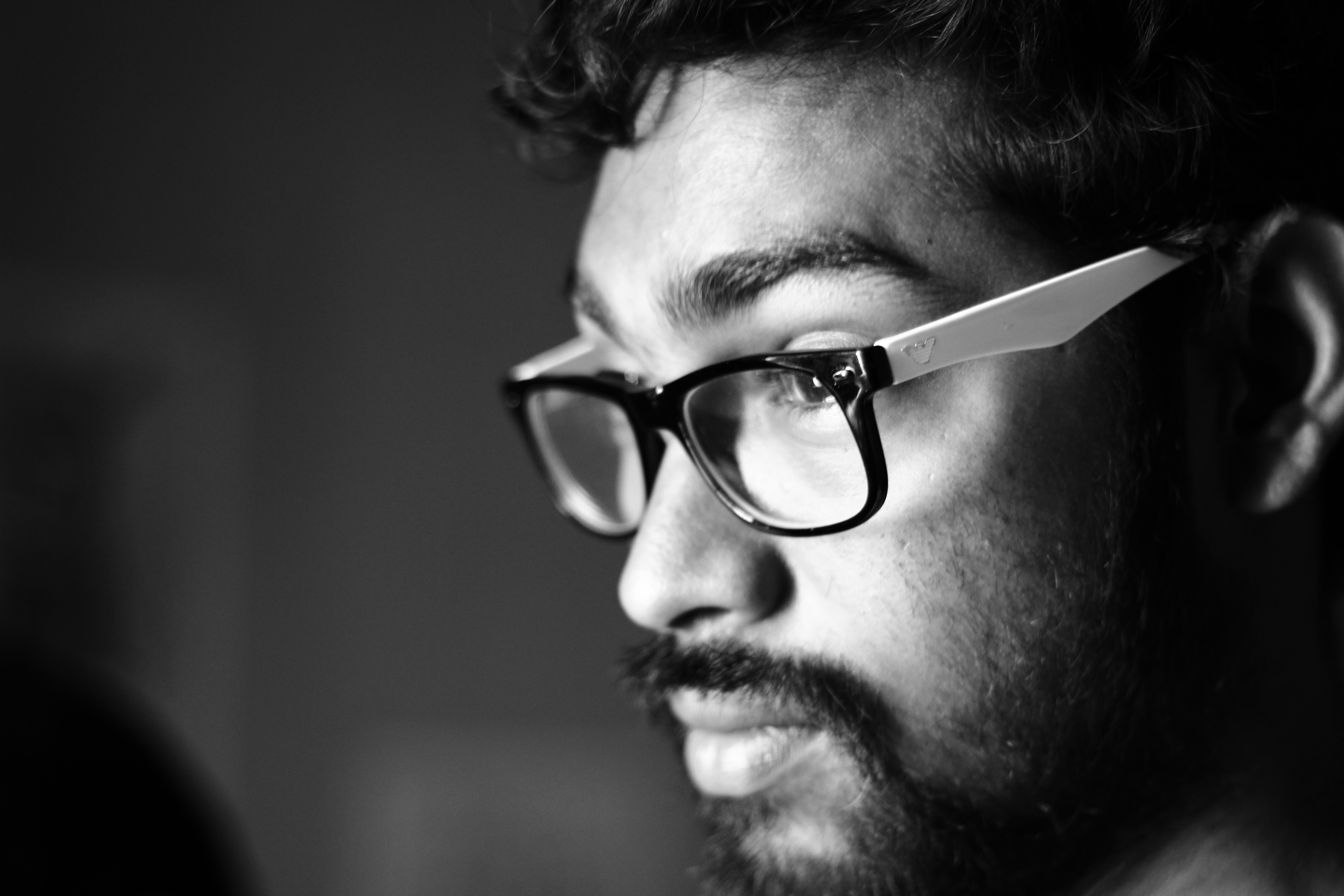

Background information
- Born: 18 October 1987 (age 38)
- Origin: Puri, Odisha, India
- Occupations: Producer, director, lyricist, cinematographer
- Years active: 2015–present

Ashutosh Pattnaik (born 18 October 1987) is an Indian filmmaker, director, and lyricist.

== Early life ==
Ashutosh was born to Baijayantimala Mohanty and Prafulla Kumar Pattnaik in an Odia family from Puri, Odisha. He went to Biswambhar Bidyapitha, Puri and subsequently attended Intermediate Science at HDV Science College, Panaspada. Then he completed BCA in NICE under Sambalpur University and animation diploma at Pentasoft, Bhubaneswar. He is a student of cinematography at Biju Pattnaik Film and TV Institute, Cuttack, Odisha.

== Career ==
=== 2015 ===
He directed a short film, A Race for Resistance, on water scarcity. Then he directed the documentary Independence based on people reviews and Khusi.

=== 2016 ===
He directed a short ad film, The Butterfly, in Odia language, about girl child discrimination issue. It was awarded 3rd Prize at the Kallola Film Festival organised by Aaina organization with Unicef.

He set up the music production company Pattnaik Bros. He started his first professional work as a lyricist and producer on the album Eka Eka Jibanare in Odia language.

His other notable works in 2016 were Think for a second, Sambalpuri Weavers- knitted with hopes and dreams about the struggle of the Sambalpuri Weavers, Upahar by BPFTIO (Biju Pattnaik Film & Television Institute of Odisha), The Sixth Element, and Chapter-4.

=== 2017 ===
He directed a short movie, Tara Can, which won 1st prize in the 5 minute category of We Care Film Fest, 2017.

== Filmography ==
Year	Film	Director	Producer	Writer	Actor	Cinematographer
2015	A Race for Resistance	Yes		Yes		
2015	Khusi	Yes		Yes		
2015	Independence	Yes		Yes		
2016	Think for a second					
2016	Sambalpuri Weavers- knitted with hopes and dreams					Yes
2016	Upahar				Yes	
2016	The Sixth Element					Yes
2016	Chapter-4					Yes
2016	The Butterfly	Yes	Yes	Yes		
2017	Tara Can	Yes				
2019	Shrikshetra Ru Sahijata	Yes				
