= Ajay Bijli =

Indian businessman

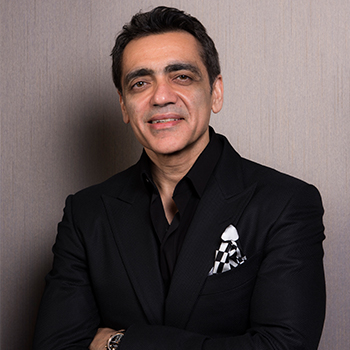
- Born: February 8, 1967 (age 59); Delhi, India
- Education: (Bcom hons) Hindu College; Delhi University; Harvard University; YPO Gold Fellow
- Occupations: Managing Director PVR INOX & PVR Inox Pictures
- Organization(s): PVR INOX & PVR Inox Pictures
- Spouse: Selena
- Children: 3

Ajay Bijli is an Indian businessman and the managing director of PVR INOX, the fifth largest listed multiplex chain globally. Bijli is the founder of PVR Cinemas and was the chairman and managing director of PVR before the merger with INOX Leisure.

He is also the managing director of PVR INOX Pictures, the motion picture wing of PVR INOX since 2013. He is on the board of trustees of the Mumbai Academy of the Moving Image and is the founding member of FICCI Multiplex Association India (MAI). He is also a member of The Film and TV Producers Guild (India), Young Presidents' Organization and is on the advisory board of Shopping Centres Association of India. He is also associated with the Central Board of Film Certification, Government of India.

Bijli has also completed the Owners/President Management program from the Graduate School of Business Administration, Harvard University. He is an YPO Gold Fellow of the world's largest leadership community of Chief Executives.

== Early life and education ==
Bijli was born and raised in a Punjabi family in Delhi, India. His father Krishan Mohan Bijli was employed by the family's road freight business, Amritsar Transport Co., which was initially established by Bijli's grandfather in 1939. The family later moved to Delhi, where Bijli pursued his education at the Modern School. He completed his BCom from Hindu College of University of Delhi. Bijli's father Krishan Mohan Bijli died in 1992. In 1994, a big fire broke out in the warehouse of his transportation business.

== Career ==
At the age of 22, Bijli joined his family's transportation business and his father's Priya Cinema in Delhi. He renovated Priya Cinema, installed a Dolby sound system, refurbished interiors, and started playing Hollywood movies. The Government of India then announced the decontrolling of movie ticket prices along with a reduction in entertainment tax, which helped in propelling Priya Cinema's profits.

In 1995, Bijli met John Crawford, Asia managing director of Village Roadshow, an Australian media major that was keen to get into India at that time. They entered into a joint venture, which led to the inception of Priya Village Roadshow (PVR). In 1997, PVR set up a multiplex cinema at Saket (Delhi) after reconstructing the Anupam Cinema.

He expanded PVR in other parts of Delhi to 12 screens by 2000, before his Australian partner left Village Roadshow from the Indian market. He then secured a funding of ₹80 crore from ICICI Ventures in 2003.

In 2012, PVR acquired the Mumbai-based Cinemax and Bijli became its managing director. He also acquired DLF's DT cinemas in 2016. In 2017, the American cinema player iPic Entertainment appointed Bijli to a board position, from which he resigned in July 2018.

As the founding member of Multiplex Association of India, Bijli initiated and submitted an enhanced safety and precautions plan for cinemas to Ministry of Information and Broadcasting (India) and various other state governments. In 2022, he launched a music video with his band Random Order to pay a tribute to the medical community for their work throughout the pandemic.

In April 2023, following the merger of PVR Cinemas and INOX Leisure, Bijli became the Managing Director (MD) of the merged entities, PVR INOX and PVR INOX Pictures.

== Discography ==
Year	Song	Film	Music director	Co-singer(s)	References
2023	Waheguru	Dunki	Pritam

== Philanthropic work ==
Bijli is one of the founding members of PVR Nest, a social arm of PVR, established in 2006. PVR Nest works in the areas of urban spaces and facilities.

== Awards and recognition ==
- Outstanding Contribution To Indian Cinema Award 2024 by IIFA for his "remarkable impact on the growth and accessibility of cinema across the country".
- International Exhibitor of the Year at CineAsia Awards 2017, Hong Kong.
- Asia Innovator of the Year at India Business Leader awards by CNBC TV18 in 2016.
- EY Entrepreneur of the Year - Business Transformation

== Personal life ==
Bijli is the son of Krishan Mohan Bijli and Sandhuro Mohan Bijli. His younger brother Sanjeev Bijli is his business partner in PVR Cinemas. He married his high school sweetheart Selena in 1990, and has three children - two daughters and a son.
