= National Film Award for Best Arts/Cultural Film =

Indian film award

- National award for contributions to non-feature films
- Sponsored by: National Film Development Corporation of India
- Rewards: Rajat Kamal (Silver Lotus); ₹2,00,000
- First award: 1985
- Most recent winner: Main Nida (2024)

The National Film Award for Best Arts/Cultural Film is one of the National Film Awards presented annually by the National Film Development Corporation of India. It is one of several awards presented for non-feature films and awarded with Rajat Kamal (Silver Lotus).

The award was instituted in 1985, at 33rd National Film Awards and awarded annually for films produced in the year across the country, in all Indian languages.

== Winners ==
Award includes 'Rajat Kamal' (Silver Lotus) and cash prize. Following are the award winners over the years:

List of films, showing the year, language(s), producer(s) and director(s)
Year	Film(s)	Language(s)	Producer(s)	Director(s)	Refs.
1985 (33rd)	Warli Painting	English	B. R. Shendge	V. K. Wankhede	
1986 (34th)	Our Islamic Heritage: Part II	English	K. K. Garg for Films Division	K. K. Garg	
1986 (34th)	Classical Dance Forms of India: Koodiattam	English	Doordarshan	Prakash Jha	
1987 (35th)	The Kingdom of God	English	Shilpabharati Publicity	Ranabir Ray	
1988 (36th)	Scroll Painters of Birbhum (Patua)	English	• Dilip Ghosh • Biswanath Bose	Raja Mitra	
1989 (37th)	Siddheshwari	Hindi	Mani Kaul	Mani Kaul	
1990 (38th)	Figures of Thought	English	Arun Khopkar	Arun Khopkar	
1990 (38th)	Vaastu Marabu	English	Min Bimbangal	Bala Kailasam	
1991 (39th)	Sanchari	English	Arun Khopkar	Arun Khopkar	
1992 (40th)	The Recluse	Hindi	Arvind Sinha	Arvind Sinha	
1992 (40th)	Suchitra Mitra	Bengali	Sailen Seth	Raja Sen	
1993 (41st)	Anukampan	Hindi	Balaka Ghosh	Balaka Ghosh	
1994 (42nd)	Painting in Time	English	Topshots	Sarbajit Sen	
1995 (43rd)	Pakarnnattam Ammannur The Actor	Malayalam	P. G. Mohan	• M. R. Rajan • C. S. Venkiteswaran	
1996 (44th)	Nauka Charitramu	English	Saroj Satyanarayan	Saroj Satyanarayan	
1997 (45th)	The Official Art Form	English	National Gallery of Modern Art	• Suhasini Mulay • R. M. Gharekhan	
1998 (46th)	A Painter of Eloquent Silence: Ganesh Pyne	English	Buddhadeb Dasgupta	Buddhadeb Dasgupta	
1999 (47th)	"Thang Ta"- The Martial Art of Manipur	English	Indira Gandhi National Centre for the Arts	Aribam Syam Sharma	
2000 (48th)	Tribal Women Artists	Hindi	Kuldeep Sinha for Films Division	Brij Bhushan for Films Division	
2001 (49th)	No Award				
2002 (50th)	The Eye of the Fish: The Kalaries of Kerala	English	Films Division	Priya Krishnaswamy	
2003 (51st)	Picasso Metamorphoses	English	Y. N. Engineer for Films Division	Nandkumar Sadamate	
2004 (52nd)	No Award				
2005 (53rd)	Naina Jogin	Hindi and Maithili	Praveen Kumar	Praveen Kumar	
2006 (54th)	Jatra Jeevan Jeevan Jatra	English	Kailash Bhuyan	Kapilas Bhuyan	
2007 (55th)	No Award				
2008 (56th)	Karna Motcham	Tamil	MGR Film and TV Institute	S. Murali Manohar	
2009 (57th)	No Award				
2010 (58th)	Leaving Home	Hindi	Jaideep Varma	Jaideep Varma	
2011 (59th)	Fried Fish, Chicken Soup and a Premiere Show	Manipuri and English	Madhusree Dutta	Mamta Murthy	
2011 (59th)	Lasya Kavvya: The World of Alarmel Valli	English	Sankalp Meshram		
2012 (60th)	Modikhanyachya Don Goshti	Marathi	Gouri Patwardhan	Gouri Patwardhan	
2013 (61st)	The Lost Behrupiya	English	Holybull Entertainment LLP	Sriram Dalton	
2013 (61st)	O Friend, This Waiting !	Telugu and English	Justin Mccarthy	Sandhya Kumar	
2014 (62nd)	Kapila		Films Division	Sanju Surendran	
2015 (63rd)	A Far Afternoon: A Painted Saga	Hindi and English	Piramal Art Foundation	Sruti Harihara Subramanian	
2015 (63rd)	Yazhpanam Thedchanamoorthy: Music Beyond Boundaries	Tamil	Siddhartha Productions	Amshan Kumar	
2016 (64th)	In the Shadow of Time	English	Indira Gandhi National Center for Arts	Shankhajeet Dey	
2016 (64th)	The Lord of the Universe	English	Shibu Prusty	Shibu Prusty	
2017 (65th)	Girija		Madhu Chandra and Sudha Datta	Debapriya Adhikary and Samanwaya Sarkar	
2018 (66th)	Bunkar: The Last of The Varanasi Weavers		Narrative Pictures and Sapna Sharma	Satyaprakash Upadhyay	
2019 (67th)	Shrikshetra Ru Sahijata	Odia	Ashutosh Pattnaik	Ashutosh Pattnaik	
2020 (68th)	Naadada Navaneeta Dr Pt. Venkateshkumar	Kannada	Dept. of Information and Public Relations, Government of Karnataka	Girish Kasaravalli	
2021 (69th)	T. N. Krishnan: Bow Strings to Divine		NFDC	V. Packirisamy	
2022 (70th)	Ranga Vibhoga	Kannada	Suneel Narasimhachar Puranik	Suneel Narasimhachar Puranik	
2022 (70th)	Varsa	Marathi	Sachin Balasaheb Suryawanshi	Sachin Balasaheb Suryawanshi	
2023 (71st)	Timeless Tamil Nadu	English	Celebrities Management Private Limited	Kamakhya Narayan Singh	
2024 (72nd)	Main Nida	Hindi	Sampreshan Media	Atul Pandey	
