= Alaka Sahani =

Indian film critic

Alaka Sahani (born 1974) is an Indian film critic and senior assistant editor with The Indian Express, Mumbai, and heads its Features section. She received the Swarna Kamal as the best film critic at the 61st National Film Awards 2014. Alaka studied in different parts of Odisha. She did her schooling at Barabati Girls High School, Baleswar, FM College, Baleswar and SB Women's College, Cuttack. Alaka is a graduate from the Indian Institute of Mass Communication, Dhenkanal, Odisha.
