= O Friend, This Waiting! =

- Directed by: Sandhya Kumar; Justin McCarthy
- Produced by: Justin McCarthy
- Starring: Rama Ravi; Bharathi Penneswaran
- Cinematography: Amit Mahanti
- Edited by: Sandhya Kumar
- Music by: R. Elangovan; Sudha Raghuraman
- Distributed by: India Foundation for the Arts
- Release date: 2012

O Friend, This Waiting! is a 2012 Indian, bilingual documentary film in Telugu and English written and directed by Sandhya Kumar, based on the poetry of 17th century Telugu composer Kshetrayya. For its wholly unconventional investigation of the Devadasi tradition in Andhra, combining an appreciation of this delicate and sensuous art form with a genuine sociological exploration, the non feature film has received the National Film Award for Best Arts/Cultural Film at the 61st National Film Awards. The film has received special mention at the Erasing Borders Festival of Classical Dance, Indo-American Arts Council, New York, 2013.

== Awards ==
National Film Awards

- National Film Award for Best Arts/Cultural Film (2013)

== International honor ==
- Mumbai International Film Festival, Mumbai 2014
- International Documentary and Short Film Festival of Kerala, 2013
- Mudra Festival of Classical Dance, National Centre for Performing Arts (NCPA), Mumbai, 2013
- Erasing Borders Festival of Classical Dance, Indo-American Arts Council, New York, 2013
- Red Poppy Art House, San Francisco, 2012
- National Gallery of Modern Art, Bangalore, 2012
