= Sare Jahan Se Accha (2018 TV series) =

Indian web reality series

- Developed by: Prakash Bhardwaj
- Written by: Pooja Saini
- Directed by: Prakash Bhardwaj
- Starring: Prakash Jha
- Theme music composer: Aum - Audio U and Me
- Composer: Prateek Gandhi
- Country of origin: India
- Original language: Hindi
- No. of seasons: 1
- No. of episodes: 5

Production
- Executive producer: Manish Singh
- Producer: Pankaj Jaiswal
- Production location: India
- Cinematography: Saket Saurabh
- Editors: Sachin Kumar Srivastava; Gaurav Sharma
- Camera setup: Single-camera
- Running time: 7-12 min
- Production company: Next Entertainment

Original release
- Network: SonyLIV; YouTube
- Release: 26 January – 1 September 2018

Saare Jahan Se Acha is a web reality series highlighting the good works of ordinary people to improve society. It is directed by Prakash Bhardwaj, and presented by filmmaker Prakash Jha. The series premiered on Republic Day of India on 26 January 2018.

== Episodes ==
No.	Title	Directed by	Written by	Original release date
1	"Episode 1"	Prakash Bhardwaj	Pooja Saini	January 26, 2018.
2	"Episode 2"	Prakash Bhardwaj	Pooja Saini	March 22, 2019
3	"Episode 3"	Prakash Bhardwaj	Pooja Saini	August 14, 2018
4	"Episode 4"	Prakash Bhardwaj	Pooja Saini	September 1, 2018
