= Sare Jahan se Accha (drawing) =

- Artist: Pramod Kamble
- Year: 1997
- Type: Pencil sketch
- Location: Ahmednagar

Sare Jahan se Accha is a pencil sketch mural in Ahmednagar city in Maharashtra, India. It was created in the year 1997. The sketch was drawn by Pramod Kamble, who is a painter and sculptor. He created it as a tribute to the nation on the occasion of 50 years of independence. It was painted on the specially-prepared wall of Mahavir Art Gallery in Ahmednagar. Kamble has portrayed Bharat Mata (goddess of Indian Independence) and 500 great people born out of Indian culture. It is said to be the world's biggest pencil sketch. This is the only fixed asset in India which was made as a part of India's 50th Independence day celebration.

== Background ==
The project was started with the vision of contributing on the occasion of the 50th year of Indian independence. Drawing the attention of tourists to Ahmadnagar was also one of the aims. Initially, it was decided to depict the struggle of Indian Independence. Later it was decided to draw pictures of great Indian personalities. A team of friends from various fields helped Kamble to finalize the list of people to be included. Sketches of 250 people were initially planned, which grew to number 500. The people were categorized into sages, deities, freedom fighters, Bharat Ratna awardees, Dadasaheb Phalke awardees, GyanPeeth awardees, Param Vir Chakra recipients and masters in various fields including sportspersons, musicians, dancers, painters, theater personalities, singers, social activists, and pioneer industrialists. Various sources including encyclopedias, magazines, and books were used. Sakal, a Marathi newspaper, helped to get some rare sketches which were not easily available.

== Project execution ==
The project preparation started in 1996. The actual work of drawing the pencil sketch started in May 1997. It was completed on the eve of Independence Day, 1997 (15 August 1997). It took 72 consecutive days, which was 1728 hours of work. Kamble dedicated three months to the project. He had to work at night to reduce disturbance from street watchers. The artist believes that the pencil sketch was the turning point in his life. Expenses for the painting were 500,000 Rs. It included preparation and painting of the wall to prepare it for pencil drawing. Swati Kamble, Mandar Kulkarni had supported the identification of the right people for the drawing as a part of the project. The pencils required for the sketch were provided by Camlin, a pencil company. The drawing turned out very nicely due to this and with right contribution and support to Kamble by members.

== Project details ==
The top of the sketch comprises the sages. These include Ram, Krishna, Vyas, Dnyaneshwar, Tukaram, Gautam Buddha, Gurunanak, etc. The Bharat Mata at the center is holding the tri-colour map of India. The Bharat Mata represents the country of India. The later part contains freedom fighters of India. The Bharat Ratna laureates are beside that. Various sports personalities are drawn on the left side and singers and musical artists are drawn on the right. Sketches of the artists (like dancers) are made along with their poses. Sketches of musical artists are made along with their musical instruments. For easy identification, sport personalities are also drawn in their famous poses or with sport equipment. No watercolor or any special material was used for the project.

== Special attributes ==
- Largest pencil sketch in India
- No use of eraser during the sketch
- 72 consecutive days, 1728 hours of work
- The sketch comprises 500 personalities on a single wall

== Important personalities depicted ==
- Shivaji
- Samarth Ramdas
- Mahatma Gandhi
- Subhashchandra Bose
- Bal Gangadhar Tilak
- Jawaharlal Nehru
- Indira Gandhi
- Rajiv Gandhi
- Rabindranath Tagore
- Vivekanand
- Lata Mangeshkar
- Asha Bhosale
- Mukesh
- Raja Rammohan Roy
- Babasaheb Ambedkar
- Jyotiba Phule

=== Social reformers ===
- Baba Amte
- Babasaheb Ambedkar
- Bal Gangadhar Tilak
- Dayananda Saraswati
- Dhondo Keshav Karve
- Gopal Ganesh Agarkar
- Gopal Hari Deshmukh
- Ishwar Chandra Vidyasagar
- Jyotirao Phule
- Mahadev Govind Ranade
- Mohandas Karamchand Gandhi
- Pandita Ramabai
- Periyar E. V. Ramasami
- Ram Mohan Roy
- Sahajanand Saraswati
- Swami Vivekananda
- Syed Ahmad Khan
- Vinayak Damodar Savarkar
- Vinoba Bhave
- Vitthal Ramji Shinde

=== Independence activists ===
- Mahadaji Scindia
- Nana Fadnavis
- Rani Lakshmibai
- Nana Sahib
- Tantia Tope
- Bal Gangadhar Tilak
- Gopal Krishna Gokhale
- Dadabhai Naoroji
- Bhikaiji Cama
- Shyamji Krishna Varma
- Annie Besant
- Lala Lajpat Rai
- Bipin Chandra Pal
- Khan Abdul Ghaffar Khan
- Chandra Shekhar Azad
- Rajaji
- K. M. Munshi
- Bhagat Singh
- Sarojini Naidu
- Sardar Patel
- Subhas Chandra Bose
- Vinayak Damodar Savarkar
- Jawaharlal Nehru
- Pritilata Waddedar
- Mohandas Karamchand Gandhi

=== Musical artists ===
- Hariprasad Chaurasia
- Alla Rakha
- Ravi Shankar
- Zakir Hussain
- Shivkumar Sharma
- Birju Maharaj
- Rohini Bhate
- Gopi Krishna
- Amjad Ali Khan
- Bismillah Khan

=== Classical singers ===
- Bhimsen Joshi
- Jasraj
- Kumar Gandharva
- Abdul Karim Khan
- Abdul Wahid Khan
- Amir Khan
- Bade Ghulam Ali Khan
- Basavaraj Rajguru
- D. V. Paluskar
- Faiyaz Khan
- Gangubai Hangal
- Hirabai Barodekar
- Kesarbai Kerkar
- Kishori Amonkar
- Shruti Sadolikar Katkar
- Ashwini Bhide Deshpande
- Kumar Gandharva
- Mallikarjun Mansur
- Mogubai Kurdikar
- Nazakat and Salamat Ali Khan
- Nivruttibua Sarnaik
- Omkarnath Thakur
- Prabha Atre
- Rashid Khan
- Roshan Ara Begum
- Sharafat Hussein Khan
- Ulhas Kashalkar
- Jitendra Abhisheki
- Hirabai Badodekar
- Begum Akhtar
- Firoz Dastur
- Parveen Sultana

=== Sports personalities ===
- Sunil Gavaskar
- Kapil Dev
- Sachin Tendulkar
- Khashaba Dadasaheb Jadhav
- Viswanathan Anand
- Leander Paes
- Mahesh Bhupathi
- PT Usha
- Milkha Singh
- Dhyan Chand

=== Jnanpith Award winners ===
- G. Sankara Kurup
- Tarashankar Bandopadhyay
- Kuppali Venkatappagowda Puttappa
- Umashankar Joshi
- Sumitranandan Pant
- Firaq Gorakhpuri
- Viswanatha Satyanarayana
- Bishnu Dey
- Ramdhari Singh 'Dinkar'
- D. R. Bendre
- Gopinath Mohanty
- Vishnu Sakharam Khandekar
- P. V. Akilan
- Asha Purna Devi
- K. Shivaram Karanth
- Sachchidananda Vatsyayan
- Birendra Kumar Bhattacharya
- S. K. Pottekkatt
- Amrita Pritam
- Mahadevi Varma
- Masti Venkatesha Iyengar
- Thakazhi Sivasankara Pillai
- Pannalal Patel
- Sachidananda Routray
- Vishnu Vaman Shirwadkar
- C. Narayana Reddy
- Qurratulain Hyder
- V. K. Gokak
- Subhas Mukhopadhyay
- Naresh Mehta
- Sitakant Mahapatra
- U. R. Ananthamurthy
- M. T. Vasudevan Nair
- Mahasweta Devi
- Ali Sardar Jafri

=== Bharat Ratna laureates ===
- Sarvepalli Radhakrishnan
- C. Rajagopalachari
- C. V. Raman
- Bhagwan Das
- Mokshagundam Visvesvarayya
- Jawaharlal Nehru
- Govind Ballabh Pant
- Dhondo Keshav Karve
- Bidhan Chandra Roy
- Purushottam Das Tandon
- Rajendra Prasad
- Zakir Husain
- Pandurang Vaman Kane
- Lal Bahadur Shastri
- Indira Gandhi
- V. V. Giri
- K. Kamaraj
- Mother Teresa
- Acharya Vinoba Bhave
- Khan Abdul Ghaffar Khan
- M. G. Ramachandran
- B. R. Ambedkar
- Nelson Mandela
- Rajiv Gandhi
- Sardar Vallabhbhai Patel
- Morarji Desai
- Abul Kalam Azad
- J. R. D. Tata
- Satyajit Ray
- A. P. J. Abdul Kalam
- Gulzarilal Nanda
- Aruna Asaf Ali

=== Dadasaheb Phalke Award winners ===
- Devika Rani Chaudhuri Roerich
- B. N. Sircar
- Prithviraj Kapoor
- Pankaj Mullick
- Ruby Myers
- B. N. Reddy
- Dhirendranath Ganguly
- Kanan Devi
- Nitin Bose
- Rai Chand Boral
- Sohrab Modi
- Paidi Jairaj
- Naushad Ali
- L. V. Prasad
- Durga Khote
- Satyajit Ray
- V. Shantaram
- Bommireddy Nagi Reddy
- Raj Kapoor
- Ashok Kumar
- Lata Mangeshkar
- Akkineni Nageswara Rao
- Bhalji Pendharkar
- Bhupen Hazarika
- Majrooh Sultanpuri
- Dilip Kumar
- Rajkumar
- Sivaji Ganesan
- Pradeep

=== Param Vir Chakra recipients ===
- Major Som Nath Sharma
- Lance Naik Karam Singh
- Second Lieutenant Rama Raghoba Rane
- Naik Jadu Nath Singh
- Company Havildar Major Piru Singh Shekhawat
- Captain Gurbachan Singh Salaria
- Major Dhan Singh Thapa
- Subedar Joginder Singh Sahnan
- Major Shaitan Singh
- Company Quarter Master Havildar Abdul Hamid
- Lieutenant-Colonel Ardeshir Burzorji Tarapore
- Lance Naik Albert Ekka
- Flying Officer Nirmal Jit Singh Sekhon
- 2/Lieutenant Arun Khetarpal
- Major Hoshiar Singh
- Naib Subedar Bana Singh
- Major Ramaswamy Parameshwaran

== Sources ==
- Article: "Kathyakoot te Chitrakoot", Magazine: Chinh – Diwali special edition year 2005
- Maharashtra Times newspaper dated 15 August 1998
- Article: "Kalasakt Avliya", Book: Achievers
- Article: "Takiche Ghav Sosta....", Paper: Dainik Ekmat, dated 10 August 2009 by Bhagwan Rautr
- "Kalajagtacha Kohinoor" by Bal J. Bothe, paper – Sakal
- Drushyakala Khand – Shilpakar Charitrakosh: Pramod Kamble
