= Rangbhoomi (2013 film) =

- Directed by: Kamal Swaroop
- Produced by: Films Division
- Release date: 2013
- Running time: 80 minutes
- Country: India
- Language: Hindi

Rangbhoomi is an Indian documentary film directed by Kamal Swaroop, telling the story of Dadasaheb Phalke, the father of Indian cinema. The film was released in 2013 and won the National Award for Best Non-Feature Film.

== Production and background ==
Kamal Swaroop got a grant from the India Foundation for the Arts (IFA) to trace Dadasaheb Phalke's life. Workshops across India, especially one in Benaras, laid the foundation for the documentary. Funded by Films Division, the film explores Phalke's life when he left cinema and turned to theatre, focusing on the semi-autobiographical play Rangbhoomi.

== Narrative structure ==
The documentary combines readings from the play's script, insights into theatre and literature, and behind-the-scenes moments of preparing for a play. The narrow alleys of Benaras become the backdrop for Swaroop's search, revealing surprising discoveries among Phalke's friends' descendants.

== Synopsis ==
Rangbhoomi follows Kamal Swaroop's attempt to uncover Dadasaheb Phalke's life in Varanasi, where he turned to theatre after leaving cinema. The focus is on Phalke's semi-autobiographical play, Rangbhoomi.

== Screenings and recognition ==
The film premiered at the Rome Film Festival and won the National Award for Best Non-Feature Film. It also opened the Ladakh International Film Festival in 2014. Also, it featured in the Indian Documentary Film Festival in Odisha.
