= Kamal Swaroop =

Indian film director

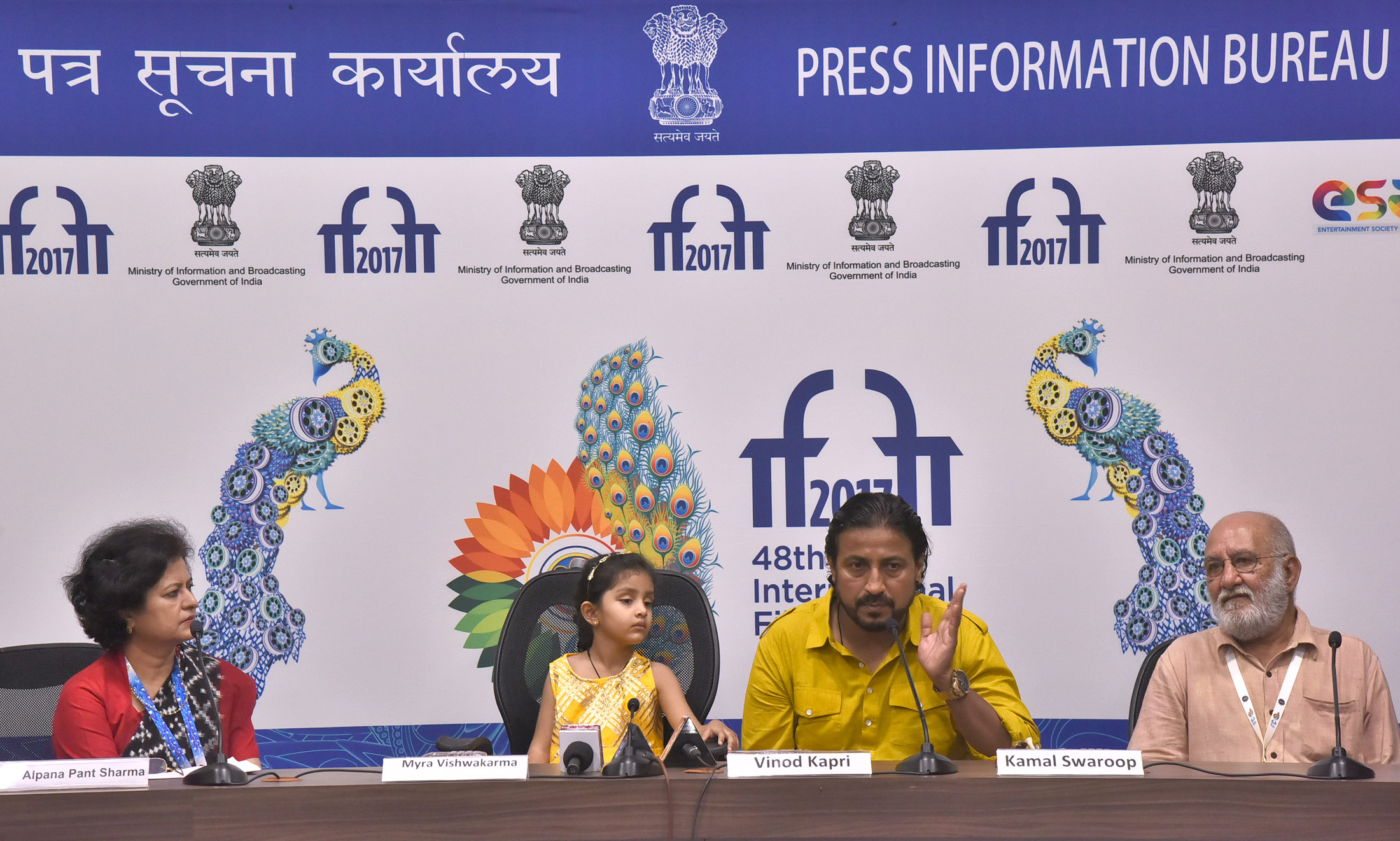
- Kamal Swaroop, IFFI (2017)
- Born: Kashmir, India
- Occupations: Film, television and radio director, screenwriter
- Notable work: Om-Dar-Ba-Dar (1988), Rangbhoomi

Kamal Swaroop is an Indian screenwriter and director of film, television, and radio. He is best known for his work in Om-Dar-Ba-Dar (1988) and Rangbhoomi, for which he has received several awards.

== Filmography ==
=== Directing ===
Swaroop is best known for directing Om-Dar-Ba-Dar (1988) and Rangbhoomi, for which he has received several awards. The restored version of Om-Dar-Ba-Dar was released on 17 January 2014.

== Early life ==
Swaroop was born in Kashmir, India. His father was a teacher and palmist, and his mother was a homemaker. The family moved to Ajmer in the Rajasthan state. There he studied biology before moving to Pune in the Maharashtra state, where he studied film directing. He had a brief stint at the Indian Space Research Organisation, where he used Russian fairytales to teach science to children. Following this, he attended filmmaking classes in a remote village in Maharashtra.

In 1974, Swaroop graduated from the Film and Television Institute of India. His student work met with unusual international acclaim. He continued with postgraduate studies at the institute.

Swaroop assisted the director Richard Attenborough in the filming of Gandhi (1982).

== Career ==
=== Rangbhoomi ===
On a grant from the India Foundation for the Arts (IFA), Swaroop began tracing the life of Dadasaheb Phalke through workshops all over India. One such workshop in Benaras was the foundation for his documentary film Rangbhoomi, produced by Films Division, a re-telling of the story of Phalke's life in Benaras.

Rangbhoomi premiered at the 2013 Rome Film Festival in the official competition section. It later won the National Film Award for Best Non-Feature Film (Golden Lotus), the second national award won by Swaroop.

=== Om-Dar-Ba-Dar ===
The idea for Om Dar-Ba-Dar occurred to Swaroop on the set of Gandhi. Commenting, he said, "I managed the crowds and told stories to keep them entertained. One of them was about a boy who skipped school and ran away from home when the results were due. He then discovers that he can make a living by holding his breath for a really long time, just like the frogs".

Om Dar-Ba-Dar is set in a mythical small town in Rajasthan and tells the tale of the boy, Om, growing into adolescence. Son of a fortune teller, Om's major problem is that, riddled with guilt about his voyeurism, he believes himself to be responsible for everything that happens around him. Meanwhile, his elder sister, Gayatri, who is being courted by Jagdish, dreams of a future in which she can ride a bicycle or sit in the men's section of a movie theatre.

Many of Om's fantasies about sexuality and death are graphically realized in remarkable song sequences: the science teacher dissecting a frog expands into a Federico Fellini-inspired "Rana Tigrina" number, or the moonwalk on a terrace on the night that Neil Armstrong lands on the moon. This double-edged satire acquires a further dimension with the entry of Phoolkumari, whose sexuality sends out a beguiling yet horrifying message. War is declared as Diwali firecrackers become real explosions. His father's diamonds, hoarded for the black market, are swallowed by frogs. In the end, Om atones by enacting the traditional legend of Brahma's descent to Earth.

Made in 1988 with the help of the National Film Development Corporation of India, Om Dar-Ba-Dar made it to the festival circuit and then shuffled out into obscurity. This film was a major attraction in the festival circuit and premiered at the Berlin Film Festival, but it never got a theatrical release in the country.

As director

- Pushkar Puran (2017)
- Battle For Benaras (2014)
- Rangbhoomi (2013)
- Bandish (2007)
- When the Image Meets the Shadow (2004)
- Om-Dar-B-Dar (1988)
- Ghashiram Kotwal (1976)
- Dorothy (1974)

=== As writer ===
- Tracing Phalke (2013)
- Private Detective: Two Plus Two Plus One (1997) (dialogues)
- Salim Langde Pe Mat Ro (1989) (researcher, script consultant)
- Salaam Bombay (dialogues)

=== As production designer ===
- Siddeshwari (1989)

=== As assistant director ===
- Gandhi (1982)
