= The Sixth Element =

- Directed by: Justin MacMillan
- Starring: Ross Clarke-Jones; Kelly Slater
- Music by: Danny Elfman
- Distributed by: Westlake Entertainment
- Release date: October 3, 2006
- Running time: 69 minutes
- Language: English

The Sixth Element is a 2006 surfing film and documentary directed by Justin MacMillan about Ross Clarke-Jones. It is the only Ross Clarke-Jones video.

== Cast ==
- Kelly Slater
- Jamie Brisick
- Matt Hoy
- Doug Silva
- Noah Johnson
- Gary "Kong" Elkerton
- Michelle LeRoy
