= Pawan K Shrivastava =

Indian filmmaker and activist (born 1982)

Pawan K. Shrivastava
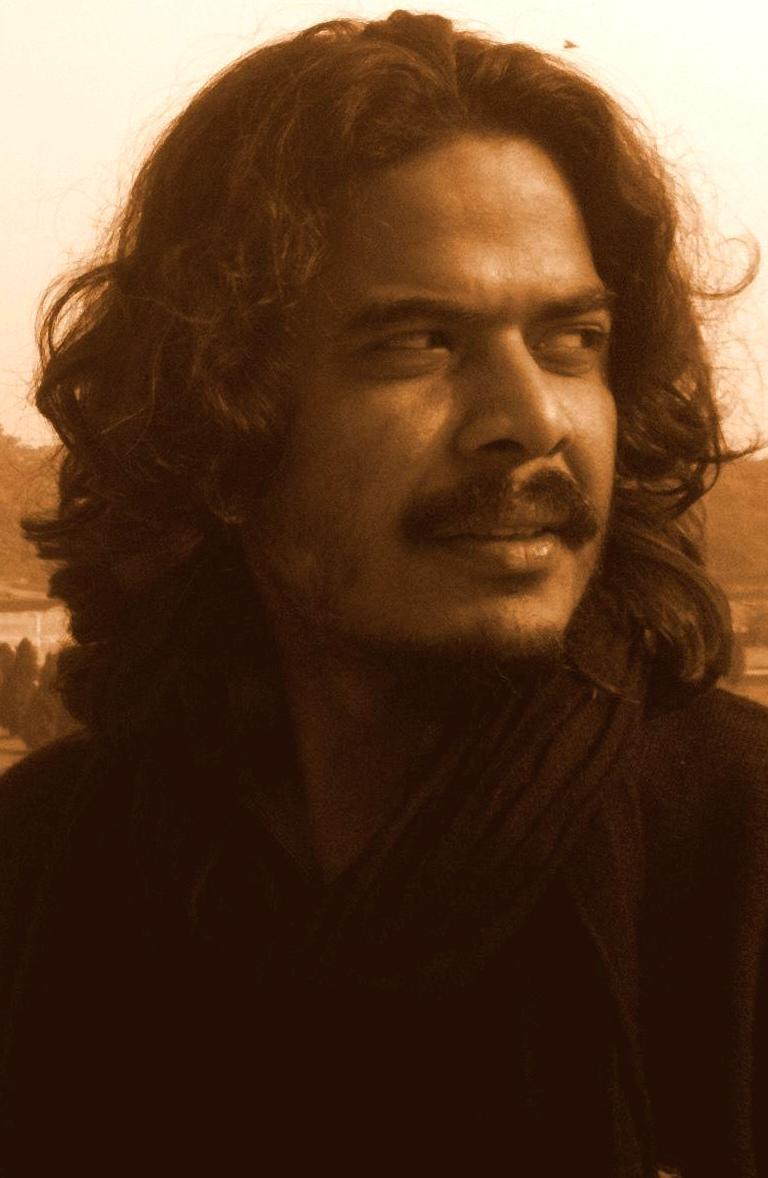
- Pawan K. Shrivastava
- Born: May 11, 1982 (age 44); Marhowrah, Bihar State, India
- Known for: Films, Activism
- Website: www.nayapata.com

Pawan K Shrivastava is a film maker, writer, blogger and activist born in 1982, in the town of Marhaura, Bihar State, India. After completing high school, he went to Allahabad for further education, and then to Delhi to work and study computer science. He left in 2008 and returned to Bihar to aid, make documentaries on, and direct plays on social issues.

Pawan is also the Director of Bihar's first independent crowd funded film, Naya Pata. He generated the funds for Naya Pata through social networking sites, personal and social connections and now he has become one of very few film makers who have tried Crowdfunding, and started a new trend for film making in India. He writes at his blogs E-Bihar and 'Patna Ki Sadko Se'. He has directed two documentaries, two short films and one feature film and has written and directed more than 200 street plays.

He has created history by making NAYA PATA through crowd Funding in just 8 Lacs. He has successfully shown the agony of migrants and their struggle for identity. He lives in Delhi and keeps himself involved in various social activities in the city.

He has been selected among 13 young innovators of 2012 from Bihar to Chart their own road of Success by Telegraph.

Pawan's first film Naya Pata is scheduled to release on 27 June through PVR Director's rare. It is going to be the first time in India that a film from Bihar is exclusively being released by PVR Director's cut.

Pawan has recently been invited by Andaman Film Society to take workshops on film making and crowd Funding in Portblair.

Following the success of Naya Pata, Pawan announced a new film titled Haashiye Ke Log, focusing on the marginalised sections of Indian society, particularly the experiences of Dalits in contemporary India. Pre-production work, including scripting, was underway as of late 2014, with a crowdfunding campaign planned to finance the project.

== Filmography ==
Year	Title	Notes
2014	Naya Pata	Feature Film; First Crowd funded film from Bihar Released in 2014 by PVR directors cut
2018	Life of an Outcast	Feature Film; Streaming on Netflix
2021	Kumbh - The Other Story	Feature Length Documentary; Released on MovieSaints in 2022
2021	I Am Draupadi	Feature Film; Completed
