= Naya Pata =

- Film poster
- Directed by: Pawan K. Shrivastava
- Written by: Pawan K. Shrivastava
- Starring: Abhishek Sharma; Shaad Ahmed; Yashwardhan Singh; Julie Warsi; Chandra Nisha; Madhuri
- Cinematography: Saket Saurabh
- Edited by: Parashar Naik
- Music by: Parashar Naik; Rupesh Pathak
- Production companies: Vaartul Films and Nayaab Vision Entertainment
- Release date: 27 June 2014
- Running time: 97 minutes
- Country: India
- Languages: Hindi and Bhojpuri

Naya Pata is a 2014 Indian Hindi-language independent film from Bihar which was produced through crowd funding. It was the directing debut film of Pawan K Shrivastava. Naya Pata is a cinema which tries to capture the emotional insight of a person during migration.

Vaartul films and Nayaab Vision Entertainment Private limited has produced Naya Pata and it was released by PVR Director's Cut on 27 June. According to Shrivastava, "Naya Pata is based on the issue of migration and its pain since last three decades in Bihar. It’s a story of the identity lost and found. It’s based on the backdrop of the closure of sugar industry in Bihar during 1985-1990. It also talks about the modern and contemporary Bihar."

Saket Saurabh was the cinematographer.

== Synopsis ==
Naya Pata is a film about the struggle of a man to re-establish his lost identity and loneliness. Instead of emphasizing on migration, the film mainly talks about the intangible things that happen to a person when he migrates from one place to other, such as loneliness, loss of Identity and sense of belongingness. It talks about the intangible consequences of the migration. We have tried to tell the emotions of a migrated person, through his silence and behavior.

Film opens in 1985–1990, a period when the sugar industry in Bihar was facing a lock-out due to some clashes between labor and trade unions. Many of the sugar factories were locked out and Ram Swarath Dubey, the protagonist of the film who used to work in the mill became jobless. Now he is left with no other option rather than migrating to a new place, i.e., New Delhi. Finally he comes to Delhi leaving behind her newly married wife. He gets a job in law firm and started working. As he started living in the city the feeling of loneliness was wandering around him. Delhi is a new world to him and in the course of time he finds himself torn between two worlds. Whenever he visits his native place, even there he feels no peace because nothing remains permanent for him. The moment when he is at home, he gets worried about the day he has to leave and when he returns to Delhi, he is again lost in the memories of home. Lost between these two worlds, he spent 25 years of his life in Delhi. He is now feeling that he should return to his village, as his only son become young and married. He was thinking to take care of remaining members of the family as he has lost his wife, father, mother... all one by one, which he could only feel now but can't live it. And finally he comes back to his village after a long period of 30 Years. He comes with a hope that his own people will give him a warm welcome and he will live rest of his life with peace and real identity. But as soon as he comes to his native place, he started facing the issue of identity loss right from the beginning. His identity is lost and now he is neither a village man nor he remains a Delhiite. He tries his best to establish his lost identity. But one day his only son informed him about his plan to migrate Nasik for a job as there is no work or employment left at their residing place. Ram Swarath Dubey was left without any answer, as it reminds him his young age when his father asked him to migrate to Delhi. Again, the situation is same and nothing has still changed. When his son Jitendar leaves for Nasik, Ram Swarath Dubey finds that his daughter-in-law stuck to the same condition as his wife used to be in, the loneliness. Ram Swarath Dubey meets a girl Sandhya, who is pass-out from a college in Patna and planning to go to Delhi for higher education. Ram Swarath feels that migration is stealing everyone's identity, and in his own village there are many people that have migrated to different states for the search of bread and butter. Ram Swarath Dubey is deeply hurt by seeing this situation. But he doesn't lose his hope and still thinks that one day everything will change and people will return to their native place. He takes a decision to send her daughter-in-law to Nasik along with his son because he doesn't want her to live same life as his wife has lived. Once his son and daughter –in-law left for Nasik, he was again living alone in the village. Now he is feeling the same loneliness again that he was feeling during his long stay in Delhi. But still he has a hope that everything will change and one day his son will return. He is still positive and start believing in government as there is political change in the state. But one night he broke out and became restless where he could see his death and loneliness. He tries his best to find a solution and finally he gets an alternative of his fear and story comes to the climax. The story leaves some questions still unanswered.

== Cast ==
- Abhishek Sharma
- Julie Warsi
- Yashwardhan Singh
- Madhuri
- Shaad Ahmed
- Chandra Nisha

== Production ==
Pawan K Shrivastava sought crowd funding from the people, despite being a debutant in the film industry.

Crowd funding helped him raise funds using various social networking sites and personal contacts. "I would send e-mails about the project to all my contacts and ask each of them to forward it to all theirs. Funds slowly came in and 30 per cent of it from absolute strangers," says Pawan, the director of Naya Pata.

Publicity material and poster were designed by painter and visual artist Vijendra S Vij.

=== Music ===
The songs of the film are composed by Rupesh Pathak.

== Release ==
Naya Pata was released on 27 June 2014 in 12 major cities of India through PVR Director's Rare. PVR Directors Rare has chosen to release this feature film. The film was released in many cities – Delhi, Mumbai, Kolkata, Bangalore, Hyderabad, Bhopal, Patna, Chandigarh, Lucknow, Jaipur, Ahmedabad and Pune.

Naya Pata was screened by Indiearth on 19 November 2014 in Chennai and it was well received by the audience and reviewers.
