= PVR INOX =

Indian multiplex cinema chain

PVR INOX Limited
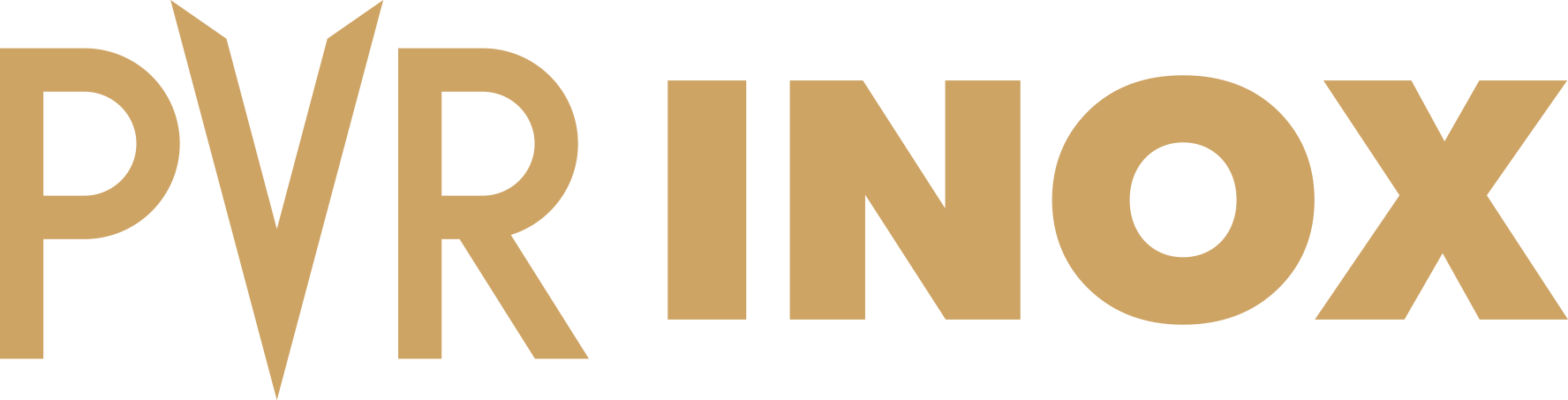

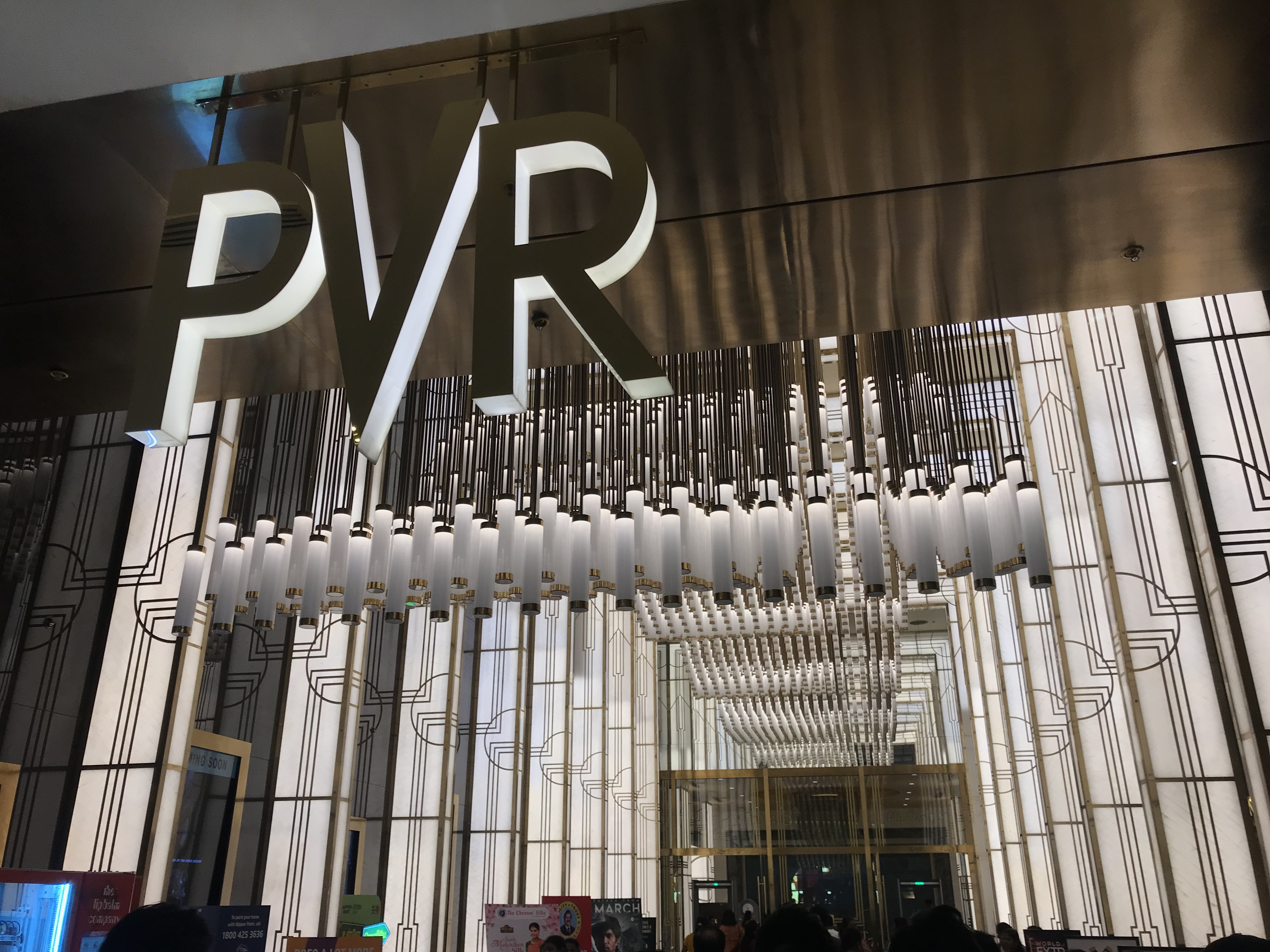
- PVR Cinemas in VR Chennai Mall in Art Deco
- Trade name: PVR INOX
- Formerly: Priya Village Roadshow Ltd (1997–2002)
- Type: Public
- Traded as: NSE: PVRINOX; BSE: 532689
- ISIN: INE191H01014
- Industry: Entertainment (Movie theatres)
- Founded: 1995
- Founder: Ajay Bijli, Ajay Kanojiya
- Headquarters: Gurgaon, Haryana, India
- Number of locations: 359 locations and 1712 screens
- Area served: India and Sri Lanka
- Key people: Ajay Bijli (MD); Sanjeev Kumar Bijli (ED); Pavan Jain (Chairman)
- Revenue: ▲₹3,829 crore (US$400 million) (2023)
- Net income: ▼₹336 crore (US$35 million) (2023)
- Number of employees: 20,000
- Subsidiaries: PVR Inox Pictures
- Website: pvrcinemas.com inoxmovies.com

PVR INOX Limited is an Indian multiplex chain. It was formed in 2023 as a result of the merger between PVR Cinemas and INOX Leisure. PVR pioneered the multiplex revolution in India by establishing the first modern multiplex cinema in 1997 at Saket, New Delhi. As of May 2025, PVR INOX operates 1,743 screens across 352 properties in 111 cities of India and Sri Lanka.

== History ==
=== PVR Cinemas ===
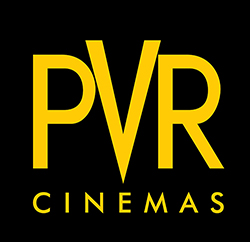
Logo used from 2001 until 2019

PVR Cinemas has its origin as Priya Cinema in Vasant Vihar, Delhi; the cinema hall was named after Priya Jaisinghani and was bought by Ajay Bijli's father in 1978, who also owned a trucking business, Amritsar Transport Co. In 1988, Bijli took over the cinema hall, which was revamped in 1990.

In 1995, the company was established as a 60:40 joint venture between Priya Exhibitors Private Limited and Village Roadshow of Australia, with commercial operations starting in June 1997 as Priya Village Roadshow (PVR). In 2003, ICICI Ventures invested ₹40 crore in PVR when Village Roadshow decided to pull out of the partnership.

In 2006, the company's shares were listed on the National Stock Exchange (NSE) and the Bombay Stock Exchange (BSE). PVR's first "Gold Screen" was launched in 2007.

In 2007, PVR Cinemas ventured into film production with PVR Pictures, producing films like Taare Zameen Par and Jaane Tu Ya Jaane Na in its initial years.

In 2012, PVR Cinemas partnered with IMAX to open its first IMAX theatre in Bengaluru. In 2014, PVR Cinemas introduced the superplex format in Noida. In 2016, PVR became the second movie theater chain in India to launch 4DX in the country after Cinépolis. In 2022, PVR Cinemas introduced its immersive theater format called ICE in Delhi NCR.

=== INOX Leisure ===
Inox Leisure Ltd.
- Type: Public
- Traded as: BSE: 532706; NSE: INOXLEISUR
- ISIN: INE312H01016
- Industry: Entertainment
- Founded: 1999; 27 years ago
- Founder: Pavan Jain
- Fate: Merged with PVR Cinemas in March 2023
- Headquarters: Viraj Towers, Andheri East, Mumbai, India
- Number of locations: 74 cities (170 multiplexes, 722 screens)
- Key people: Pavan Jain (Chairman); Siddharth Jain (Board Member); Alok Tandon (CEO)
- Revenue: ▲₹1,707 crore (US$180 million)
- Owner: Inox Group
- Number of employees: 1500
- Subsidiaries: Fame Cinemas; Satyam Cineplex
- Website: www.inoxmovies.com

INOX Leisure or INOX Movies was an Indian multiplex chain based in Mumbai. The company was incorporated as a public limited company in November 1999, as a part of the Inox Group (Industrial Oxygen) of companies. In 2002, the company commenced its operation by opening its first four-screen multiplex at Pune and another four-screen multiplex at Vadodara. In 2004, multiplexes were added in Kolkata, Goa, and Mumbai.

In 2006, the company went public, with Gujarat Fluorochemicals selling stake in its initial public offering.

In 2006, INOX acquired 89 Cinemas, owned by Calcutta Cinema Private Ltd (CCPL), in a share swap deal, giving INOX ownership of nine multiplexes in West Bengal and Assam.

INOX acquired Satyam Cineplexes for ₹182 crore, giving it ownership of multiplexes in Delhi NCR, Mysuru and other regions.

In December 2022, INOX had 170 multiplexes and 722 screens in 74 cities.

=== PVR–INOX merger ===
On 27 March 2022, INOX announced it would be merging with PVR. On 12 January 2023, the Mumbai bench of the National Company Law Tribunal (NCLT) approved the merger of PVR and INOX.

In February 2023, after the merger was completed, PVR was renamed PVR INOX. The merged entity became the fifth largest listed multiplex chain globally by screen count and the largest in India. All the new properties opened after the merger with Inox were branded as PVR Inox, while the existing properties owned by PVR and Inox before the merger continued to carry PVR and Inox branding respectively.

In February 2024, the company launched India's first standalone IMAX theatre with 4K projection by refurbishing the 86-year-old heritage Eros Cinema in Churchgate, Mumbai. In April 2024, the company launched its first megaplex in South India at Bengaluru's Phoenix Mall of Asia.

== Acquisitions ==
=== CineMAX ===
Cinemax India Ltd was an Indian cinema chain which owned 138 screens across 39 properties in India, including Ahmedabad, Bengaluru, Hyderabad, Kochi, Mumbai, Pune, Kolkata, Kanpur, Bhopal and Nashik. It was owned by the Kanakia group, before being acquired by Cine Hospitality Private Ltd, a subsidiary of PVR Cinemas, in 2012. The acquired properties were renamed as PVR Cinemas in a phased manner over the years.

=== DT Cinemas ===
In May 2016, DLF group owned DT Cinemas was acquired by PVR Cinemas for ₹500 crore. The properties were later rebranded as PVR.

=== SPI Cinemas ===
SPI Cinemas, a multiplex chain based in Chennai, had its origins in the Royal Theatre, built in 1974 and acquired by the Kiran Reddy family in the 1980s. Royal Theatre later evolved into Sathyam Cinemas. In August 2018, PVR Cinemas acquired SPI Cinemas for ₹850 crore and rebranded the properties as PVR.

=== Luxe Cinemas ===
Luxe, a premium multiplex with 11 screens operating at Phoenix Marketcity, Chennai owned by Jazz Cinemas, was acquired by INOX in October 2022, which in turn merged with PVR in 2023.

== PVR Inox Pictures ==
PVR INOX Pictures is the film distribution arm of PVR Inox. It was earlier named PVR Pictures and rebranded as PVR Inox Pictures in 2023 after the merger of PVR Cinemas and Inox Leisure.

== Partnerships ==
In October 2021, PVR announced a partnership with the film RRR as part of which, PVR rebranded itself as PVRRR across the multiplex chain's properties in over 70 cities for a few months following the film's release on 25 March 2022. As part of the promotions, they also launched an exclusive NFT (non-fungible token) collection for the film.

PVR expanded its partnership agreement with laser cinema company Cinionic to power all of its screens with Barco Series 4 4K laser projection.

In 2023, PVR INOX live-streamed matches of the 2023 ICC Men's Cricket World Cup.

In April 2024, PVR INOX partnered with Miraj Entertainment to expand IMAX to smaller towns in India.

In May 2024, Devyani International and PVR INOX announced a partnership to operate food courts in shopping malls.
