= National Film Award for Best Cinematography (non-feature film) =

Indian film award

- National award for contributions to non-feature films
- Sponsored by: National Film Development Corporation of India
- Rewards: Rajat Kamal (Silver Lotus); ₹2,00,000
- First award: 1990
- Most recent winner: Saravanamaruthu Soundarapandi and Meenakshi Soman, Little Wings (2023)

The National Film Award for Best Cinematography is one of the National Film Awards presented annually by the National Film Development Corporation of India. It is one of several awards presented for non-feature films and awarded with Rajat Kamal (Silver Lotus).

The award was instituted in 1990, at 38th National Film Awards and awarded annually for short films produced in the year across the country, in all Indian languages. Since the 70th National Film Awards (2022), the primary/main cinematographer is eligible to the award, thus eliminating the existing Cameraman and Laboratory Processing sub-categories.

== Winners ==
Award includes 'Rajat Kamal' (Silver Lotus) and cash prize. Following are the award winners over the years:

Indicates a joint award for that year

=== 1991–2021 ===
List of award recipients, showing the year (award ceremony), film(s) and language(s)
Year	Cameraman(s)	Laboratory Processing	Film(s)	Language(s)	Refs.
1990 (38th)	Santosh Sivan	Prasad Film Laboratories	Mohiniyattam	English	
1990 (38th)	Victor Banerjee	Prasad Film Laboratories	Where No Journeys End	English	
1991 (39th)	Shekar Dattatri	Prasad Film Laboratories	Silent Valley: An Indian Rain forest	English	
1992 (40th)	Soumendu Roy	Adlabs	Sucitra Mitra	Bengali	
1993 (41st)	Piyush Shah	–	Moksha	Bengali	
1994 (42nd)	Anoop Jotwani	Vijay Color Lab	Rasayatra	Hindi and English	
1995 (43rd)	Rafey Mehmood	Adlabs	Tarana	Hindi	
1996 (44th)	Hari Nair	Prasad Film Laboratories	Sham's Vision	English	
1997 (45th)	Ashok Dasgupta	–	The Trail	English	
1998 (46th)	Ranjan Palit	Prasad Film Laboratories	In The Forest Hangs a Bridge	English	
1999 (47th)	Mankada Ravi Varma	Prasad Film Laboratories	Kalamandalam Gopi	Malayalam	
2000 (48th)	Prasann Jain	Adlabs	Rasikpriya	Hindi and English	
2001 (49th)	Nilotpal Sarkar	Prasad Film Laboratory	Jorasanko Thakurbari	English	
2001 (49th)	Irom Maipak	Prasad Kalinga Lab	The Monpas of Arunachal Pradesh	English	
2002 (50th)	No Award				
2003 (51st)	Ranjan Palit	Prasad Film Laboratory	Kaya Poochhe Maya Se	Hindi	
2003 (51st)	K. G. Jayan	Prasad Film Laboratory	The 18th Elephant: Three Monologues	Malayalam	
2004 (52nd)	Manoj Raymond Lobo	Adlabs	Girni	Marathi	
2005 (53rd)	Paramvir Singh	Adlabs	Parsiwada, Tarapore Present Day	English and Gujarati	
2006 (54th)	Rajendra Janglay	–	Raga of River Narmada	–	
2006 (54th)	Sanjay V.	–	Raga of River Narmada	–	
2007 (55th)	Savita Singh	–	Kramasha	Hindi	
2008 (56th)	Shariqva Badar Khan	Filmlab	Three of Us	–	
2008 (56th)	Jaya Krishna Gummadi	Adlabs	When This Man Dies	Hindi and English	
2009 (57th)	Deepu S. Unni	Adlabs	Gaarud	Hindi and Marathi	
2010 (58th)	Murali G.	Filmlab	Shyam Raat Seher	Hindi and English	
2011 (59th)	S. Nallamuthu	–	Tiger Dynasty	English	
2012 (60th)	Abhimanyu Dange	Reliance MediaWorks	Kaatal	Marathi	
2012 (60th)	Raja Shabir Khan	–	Shepherds of Paradise	Gojri and Urdu	
2013 (61st)	Kavin Jagtiani	Reliance MediaWorks	Mandrake !Mandrake !	Hindi	
2014 (62nd)	Indraneel Lahiri	–	Aamaar Katha: Story of Binodini	Bengali	
2015 (63rd)	Amartya Bhattacharyya	–	Benaras: The Unexplored Attachments	Bengali	
2016 (64th)	Alpesh Nagar	–	Kalpvriksha	Hindi	
2016 (64th)	Vishal Sangwai	–	Adnyat	English	
2017 (65th)	Appu Prabhakar	–	Eye Test	–	
2017 (65th)	Arnold Fernandes	–	Dawn	–	
2018 (66th)	Ajay Bedi	–	The Secret Life of Frogs	–	
2019 (67th)	Savita Singh	–	Sonsi	Hindi	
2020 (68th)	Nikhil S. Praveen	–	Shabdikkunna Kalappa (Talking Plow)	Malayalam	
2021 (69th)	Bittu Rawat	–	Pataal-Tee	Bhotiya	

=== 2022–present ===
Since the 70th National Film Awards, cinematographer alone is awarded.

List of award recipients, showing the year (award ceremony), film(s) and language(s)
Year	Recipient(s)	Film(s)	Language(s)	Refs.
2022 (70th)	Siddharth Diwan	Mono No Aware	Hindi and English	
2023 (71st)	Saravanamaruthu Soundarapandi and Meenakshi Soman	Little Wings	Tamil	
2024 (72nd)	Edmond Ranson	Life in Loom	English, Tamil, Hindi, Assamese and Bengali	
