= Janice Pariat =

Indian poet and writer

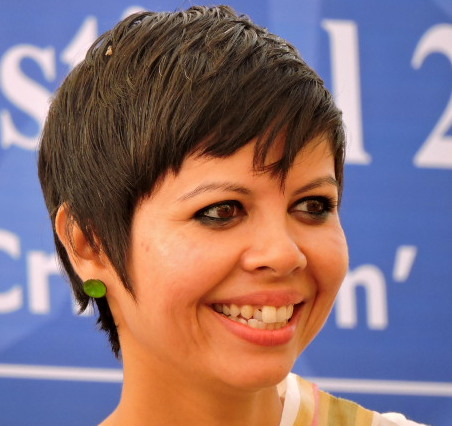
- Janice Pariat in 2016
- Born: Jorhat, Assam, India
- Occupations: Writer, poet
- Writing career
- Language: English
- Notable works: Boats on Land, The Nine Chambered Heart, Everything the light touches

Janice Pariat is an Indian poet and writer. She is best known for Boats on Land which won the Sahitya Akademi Yuva Puraskar, and Everything the Light Touches which garnered the Sushila Devi Award. Pariat teaches Creative Writing and History of Art at Ashoka University.

== Early life and career ==
Janice was born in Jorhat, Assam, and grew up between Shillong and several tea estates in Assam. She was educated at Loreto Convent, Shillong and The Assam Valley School. Thereafter, she obtained a BA in English Literature from St. Stephen's College, Delhi and an MA in History of Art and/or Archaeology from SOAS, University of London.

She is the editor of online literary journal Pyrta, which she founded in 2010. Her writing has featured in a number of Indian and international magazines, such as Time Out Delhi, The Caravan and Internazionale.

In 2014 she was the Charles Wallace Creative Writing Fellow with residency at University of Kent. In 2019 she was a writer-in-residence at the Toji Cultural Foundation in South Korea.

Pariat has been on the jury for the 2022 JCB Prize for Literature. Pariat teaches creative writing and history of Art at Ashoka University.

== Style ==
In Boats on Land, Pariat's stories – set between Shillong, Cherrapunji and Assam – undertake fictional re-imaginings of the transformations that swept through Northeast India during a period of three centuries, starting in the 1850s. Weaving together local folklore and tradition with unfolding social and political events, Pariat's style has been likened to magical realism as well as to Haruki Murakami's writing. Jeet Thayil commented on her stories to be 'revelatory and original'.

Capturing the metamorphosis of Pariat's style in more than a decade, poet Urvashi Bahuguna notes that her stories remain anchored in "unrequited, unequal and thwarted love."

== Writing ==
=== Boats on Land ===
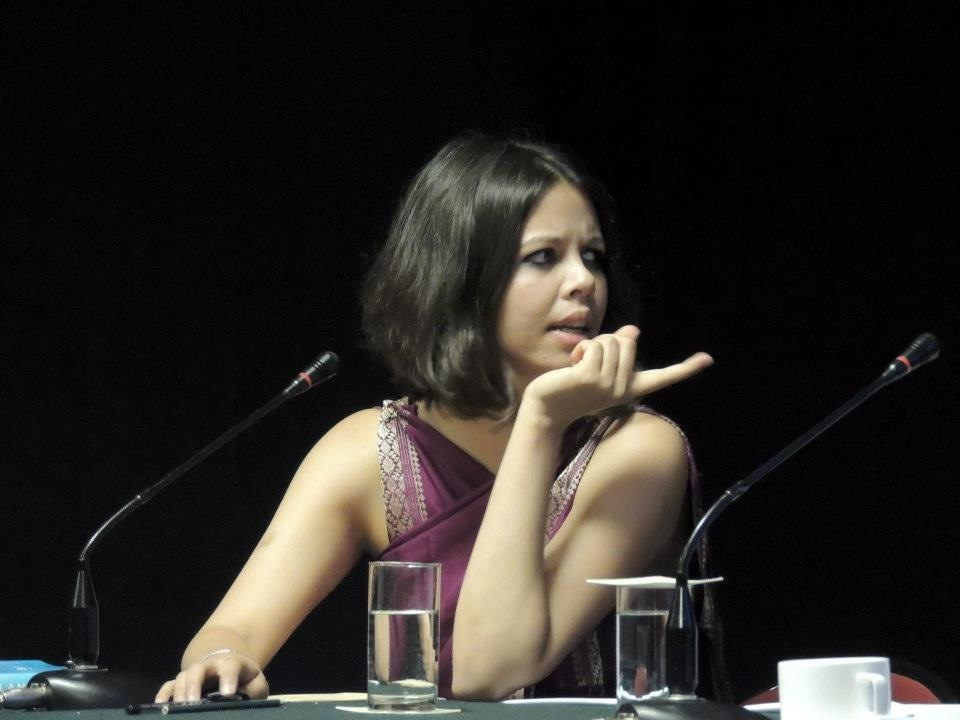
Pariat at the launch of Boats on Land in 2012.

Pariat's debut collection of short stories are set in and around Shillong and the tea estates that she grew up in. Boats on Land: A Collection Of Short Stories was released in September 2012 under Vintage Books imprint. It won the Sahitya Akademi Yuva Puraskar for the English language in 2013, making her the first writer from Meghalaya to win an award from the institution.

=== Seahorse ===
This was Pariat's first novel which retells the Greek myth of Poseidon and his devotee Pelops but set in Old Delhi.

=== Everything the Light Touches ===
Pariat's ambitious novel, Everything the Light Touches was released in India in October 2022 by Fourth Estate, HarperCollins. It was released almost a year later in the UK under The Borough Press imprint, and Italian translation by Salani Editore. Smitha Verma reflects that the book can be best described with its midway quote "Sometimes a place is more than just a place. It becomes a thing that shines like a beacon, where all your dreams and aspirations are fulfilled."

The idea for the book emerged in 2014, and writing it was a challenge due to its expanse. In their endorsements, the publishers noted that the book is "extraordinarily bold and ambitious" and "makes you think anew about the world around you." Frontline in their review wrote, the "broad, expansive work... is richly served by the author's luminous prose.... [it] defies easy categorisation.... delivers gifts that are not easy to explain but stays with you for a long time." The review draws several parallels to the Robin Wall Kimmerer's Braiding Sweetgrass. The Open magazine's review of the book draws parallel to Andrea Wulf's The Invention of Nature. They write that the novel captures a sense of emotional displacement that some experience with "incredible and affecting accuracy." The Guardian called the novel, "atmospheric and accomplished." The Indian Express called it a "deeply therapeutic novel". Hindustan Times review writes that Pariat's narrative skills shine through in the little details that elevate it while being wonderful even at the broad strokes. Vogue India calls the novel "a celebration of curiosity through the ages" with gentle language and elegant prose piercing through "the deepest places of the heart." The Telegraph (India) called the novel "the very best of eco fiction" with its various characters woven together into "an interconnected and a symbiotic forest of ideas." The New Indian Express praised the historical detailing combined with research to layer several genres such as history, taxonomy, prose, and poetry into the ambitious novel.

The New Yorker listed the book in the 'also recommended' section of their Best Books of 2022. In 2023 the novel won the Sushila Devi Award in the best fiction category and AutHer Award for Best Fiction.

== List of works ==
=== Fiction ===
- Everything the Light Touches, HarperCollins, 2022. ISBN 0063210045
- The Nine-Chambered Heart, HarperCollins India, New Delhi, 2017. ISBN 978-93-5277-379-4
- Seahorse: A novel, Random House India, New Delhi, 2014. ISBN 978-8-184-00668-1
- Boats on Land: A collection of short stories, Random House India, New Delhi, 2012. ISBN 978-8-184-00074-0

=== Poetry ===
- The Yellow Nib Modern English Poetry by Indians (Sudeep Sen ed.), Seamus Heaney Centre for Poetry, Queen's University Belfast, 2011 .
- Kavi Kala: The Visual Poetry Project (Madness Manali ed.), Cinnamon Teal Print and Publishing, Goa, 2010. ISBN 978-93-80151-79-3

=== Anthology ===
- We Come From Mist: Writings from Meghalaya, Zubaan, New Delhi, 2023. ISBN 978-9-390-51426-7

== Awards and honours ==
In 2013, Pariat's debut collection of short stories Boats on Land won the Sahitya Akademi Young Writer Award for the English language, and a Crossword Book Award (fiction). The same work was also shortlisted for the 2013 Shakti Bhatt First Book Prize, and longlisted for the 2013 uday lakhanpal International Short Story Award and the 2013 Tata Literature Live! First Book Award. Seahorse was shortlisted for The Hindu Literary Prize (2015).

Her latest book 'Everything the Light Touches' was long listed for JCB Prize for Literature 2023. Janice bagged the Sushila Devi Award for her latest book 'Everything the Light Touches' for best fiction 2023.

== Gallery ==
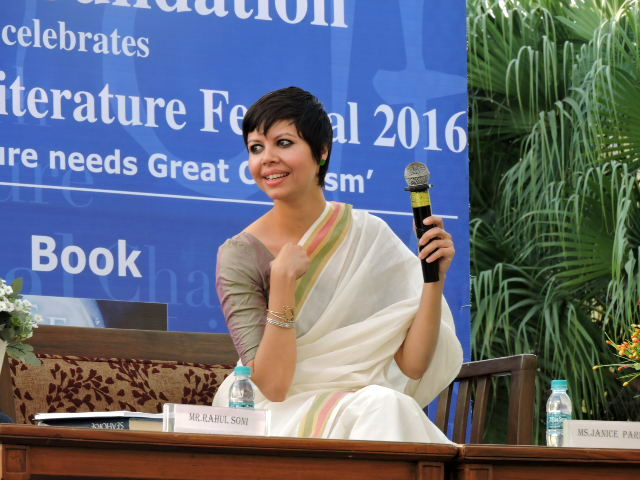
Chandigarh Literature Festival 2016

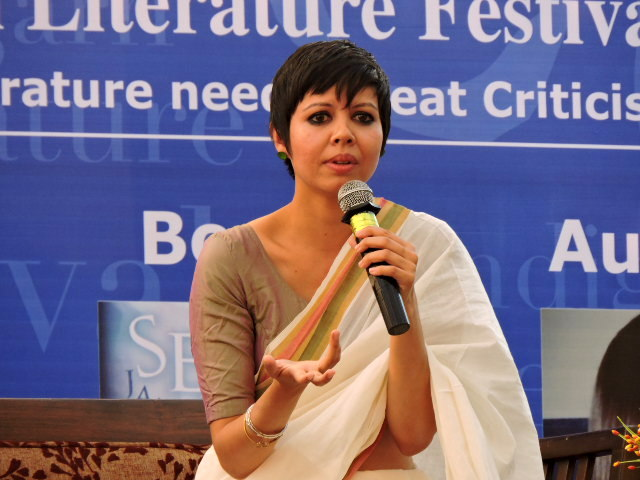
Chandigarh Literature Festival 2016

== See also ==
- Literature from North East India
- Indian English literature
- Stephanian school of literature
