= 67th National Film Awards =

Indian ceremony celebrating cinema of 2019

- Awarded for: Best of Indian cinema in 2019
- Awarded by: Directorate of Film Festivals
- Presented by: M. Venkaiah Naidu (Vice President of India)
- Announced on: 22 March 2021
- Presented on: 25 October 2021
- Hosted by: TBA
- Official website: dff.nic.in

Highlights
- Best Feature Film: Marakkar: Lion of the Arabian Sea
- Best Non-Feature Film: An Engineered Dream
- Best Book: A Gandhian Affair: India's Curious Portrayal of Love in Cinema
- Dadasaheb Phalke Award: Rajinikanth
- Most awards: Marakkar: Lion of the Arabian Sea (3)

The 67th National Film Awards were announced at a press meet on 22 March 2021 to honour the best Indian films certified in India between 1 January and 31 December 2019. The awards ceremony, at which the Directorate of Film Festivals presents its annual National Film Awards to honour the best in Indian cinema, was originally slated to be held on 3 May 2020. It was postponed due to the COVID-19 pandemic, and was presented on 25 October 2021.

== Selection process ==
The Directorate of Film Festivals invited online entries and the acceptable last date for entries was until 17 February 2020. Feature and Non-Feature Films certified by Central Board of Film Certification between 1 January 2019, and 31 December 2019, were eligible for the film award categories. Books, critical studies, reviews or articles on cinema published in Indian newspapers, magazines, and journals between 1 January 2019, and 31 December 2019, were eligible for the best writing on cinema section. Entries of dubbed, revised or copied versions of a film or translation, abridgements, edited or annotated works and reprints were ineligible for the awards.

For the Feature and Non-Feature Films sections, films in any Indian language, shot on 16 mm, 35 mm, a wider film gauge or a digital format, and released in cinemas, on video or digital formats for home viewing were eligible. Films were required to be certified as a feature film, a featurette or a Documentary/Newsreel/Non-Fiction by the Central Board of Film Certification.

== Dadasaheb Phalke Award ==
Introduced in 1969, the Dadasaheb Phalke Award is the highest award given to recognise the contributions of film personalities towards the development of Indian cinema and for distinguished contributions to the medium, its growth and promotion."

A committee consisting five eminent personalities from Indian film industry was appointed to evaluate the lifetime achievement award, Dadasaheb Phalke Award. Following were the jury members:

- Jury Members

• Asha Bhosle
• Subhash Ghai
• Mohanlal
• Shankar Mahadevan
• Biswajit Chatterjee

Name of Award	Image	Awardee(s)	Awarded as	Awards
Dadasaheb Phalke Award		Rajinikanth	Actor	Swarna Kamal, ₹1 million (US$10,000) and a shawl

== Best Film Friendly State ==
The awards aim at encouraging study and appreciation of cinema as an art form and dissemination of information and critical appreciation of this art-form through a State Government Policy.

Jury

• Shaji N. Karun (Chairperson)
• Manju Borah	• Ravi Kottarakara
• Ravi Kottarakara	• Firdausul Hasan
• Firdausul Hasan	• Abhishek Shah

Award	Name of State	Citation
Best Film Friendly State	State of Sikkim	

== Feature films ==
=== Jury ===
Jury Panel	Central	North	South-1	South-2	East	West
Chairperson	N. Chandra	Manju Borah	Arunoday Sharma	Subhash Sehgal	G P Vijayakumar	C. Umamaheswara Rao
Members	C. Umamaheswara Rao	Sasidharan Pillai	Pampally	Prashant Naik	Rajesh Kumar Singh	Christopher Dalton
	Manju Borah	Anuradha Singh	Vinod Mankara	Nidhi Prasad	Maniram Singh	GK Desai
	Bijaya Jena	Adeep Tandon	Saran	Prakash HB	Ajaya Routray	Dnyanesh Moghe
	Dilip Shukla	Atul Pandey	K. Umamaheswara Rao	Rajendra Prasad Choudrie	Arijit Halder	Sanjay Khanzode

=== Golden Lotus Awards ===
Official Name: Swarna Kamal

All the awardees are awarded with 'Golden Lotus Award (Swarna Kamal)', a certificate and cash prize.

Award	Film	Language	Awardee(s)	Cash prize
Best Feature Film	Marakkar: Lion of the Arabian Sea	Malayalam	Producer: Antony Perumbavoor; Director: Priyadarshan	₹250,000 each
Best Direction	Bahattar Hoorain (72 Hoorain)	Hindi	Sanjay Puran Singh Chauhan	₹250,000 each
Best Debut Film of a Director	Helen	Malayalam	Producer: Vineeth Sreenivasan; Director: Mathukutty Xavier	₹125,000 each
Best Popular Film Providing Wholesome Entertainment	Maharshi	Telugu	Producer: Sri Venkateswara Creations; Vyjayanthi Movies; PVP Cinema; Director: Vamshi Paidipally	₹200,000 each
Best Children's Film	Kastoori	Hindi	Producer: Insight Films; Director: Vinod Uttreshwar Kamble	₹150,000 each

=== Silver Lotus Award ===
Official Name: Rajat Kamal

All the awardees are awarded with 'Silver Lotus Award (Rajat Kamal)', a certificate and cash prize.

Award	Film	Language	Awardee(s)	Cash prize
Best Feature Film on National Integration	Tajmal	Marathi	Producer: Tuline Studios Pvt. Ltd. Director: Niyaz Mujawar	₹150,000 each
Best Film on Other Social Issues	Anandi Gopal	Marathi	Producer: Essel Vision Productions Ltd.; Freshlime Films LLP; Namah Pictures Pvt. Ltd.; Director: Sameer Vidwans	₹150,000 each
Best Film on Environment Conservation/Preservation	Water Burial	Monpa	Producer: Faruque Iftikar Laskar; Director: Shantanu Sen	₹150,000 each
Best Actor	Bhonsle	Hindi	Manoj Bajpayee	₹50,000 each
Best Actor	Asuran	Tamil	Dhanush	₹50,000 each
Best Actress	Manikarnika: The Queen of Jhansi; Panga	Hindi	Kangana Ranaut	₹50,000
Best Supporting Actor	Super Deluxe	Tamil	Vijay Sethupathi	₹50,000,000
Best Supporting Actress	The Tashkent Files	Hindi	Pallavi Joshi	₹50,000
Best Child Artist	KD	Tamil	Naga Vishal	₹50,000
Best Male Playback Singer	Kesari (For the song "Teri Mitti")	Hindi	B Praak	₹50,000
Best Female Playback Singer	Bardo (For the song "Raan Petala")	Marathi	Savani Ravindra	₹50,000
Best Cinematography	Jallikattu	Malayalam	Girish Gangadharan	₹50,000
Best Screenplay • Screenplay Writer (Original)	Jyeshthoputro	Bengali	Kaushik Ganguly	₹50,000
Best Screenplay • Screenplay Writer (Adapted)	Gumnaami	Bengali	Srijit Mukherji	₹50,000
Best Screenplay • Dialogues	The Tashkent Files	Hindi	Vivek Ranjan Agnihotri	₹50,000
Best Audiography • Location Sound Recordist	Iewduh	Khasi	Debajit Gayan	₹50,000
Best Audiography • Sound Designer	Trijya	Marathi	Mandar Kamalapurkar	₹50,000
Best Audiography • Re-recordist of the Final Mixed Track	Oththa Seruppu Size 7	Tamil	Resul Pookutty	₹50,000
Best Editing	Jersey	Telugu	Naveen Nooli	₹50,000
Best Production Design	Anandi Gopal	Marathi	Sunil Nigwekar; Nilesh Wagh	₹50,000
Best Costume Design	Marakkar: Lion of the Arabian Sea	Malayalam	Sujith Sudhakaran; V. Sai	₹50,000
Best Make-up Artist	Helen	Malayalam	Ranjith	₹50,000
Best Music Direction • Songs	Viswasam	Tamil	D. Imman	₹50,000
Best Music Direction • Background Score	Jyeshthoputro	Bengali	Prabuddha Banerjee	₹50,000
Best Lyrics	Kolaambi (For the song "Arodum Parayuka Vayya")	Malayalam	Prabha Varma	₹50,000
Best Special Effects	Marakkar: Lion of the Arabian Sea	Malayalam	Siddharth Priyadarshan	₹50,000
Best Choreography	Maharshi (For the song "Everest Anchuna")	Telugu	Raju Sundaram	₹50,000
Best Stunt Choreographer	Avane Srimannarayana	Kannada	Vikram More	₹50,000
Special Jury Award	Oththa Seruppu Size 7	Tamil	R. Parthiban	₹2,00,000
Special Mention	Biriyaani	Malayalam	Sajin Babu (Director)	Certificate only
Special Mention	Jonaki Porua	Assamese	Benjamin Daimary (Actor)	Certificate only
Special Mention	Lata Bhagwan Kare	Marathi	Lata Kare (Actress)	Certificate only
Special Mention	Picasso	Marathi	Abhijeet Mohan Warang (Director)	Certificate only

=== Regional awards ===
National Film Awards are also given to the best films in the regional languages of India. Awards for the regional languages are categorised as per their mention in the Eighth schedule of the Constitution of India. Awardees included producers and directors of the film. No films in languages other than those specified in the Schedule VIII of the Constitution were eligible.

Award	Film	Awardee(s)		Cash prize
Award	Film	Producer	Director	Cash prize
Best Feature Film in Assamese	Ronuwa - Who Never Surrender	Bornali Creative Vision Entertainment	Chandra Mudoi	₹1,00,000 each
Best Feature Film in Bengali	Gumnaami	SVF Entertainment Pvt. Ltd.	Srijit Mukherji	₹1,00,000 each
Best Feature Film in Hindi	Chhichhore	• Nadiadwala Grandson Entertainment • Fox Star Studios	Nitesh Tiwari	₹1,00,000 each
Best Feature Film in Kannada	Akshi	Kalaadegula Studio	Manoj Kumar	₹1,00,000 each
Best Feature Film in Konkani	Kaajro	de Goan Studio	Nitin Bhaskar	₹1,00,000 each
Best Feature Film in Malayalam	Kalla Nottam	First Print Studios	Rahul Riji Nair	₹1,00,000 each
Best Feature Film in Manipuri	Eigi Kona	Luwang Apokpa Mamikol Production	• Bobby Wahengbam • Haorongbam	₹1,00,000 each
Best Feature Film in Odia	Sala Budhar Badla	New Generation Films	Sabyasachi Mohapatra	₹1,00,000 each
Best Feature Film in Odia	Kalira Atita	Eleeanora Images Pvt. Ltd.	Nila Madhab Panda	₹1,00,000 each
Best Feature Film in Marathi	Bardo	Ritu Films Cut LLP	Bhimrao Mude	₹1,00,000 each
Best Feature Film in Punjabi	Rabb Da Radio 2	Vehli Janta Films	Sharandeep Singh	₹1,00,000 each
Best Feature Film in Tamil	Asuran	V Creations	Vetrimaaran	₹1,00,000 each
Best Feature Film in Telugu	Jersey	Sithara Entertainments	Gowtam Tinnanuri	₹1,00,000 each

Best Feature Film in Each of the Language Other Than Those Specified In the Schedule VIII of the Constitution

Award	Film	Awardee(s)		Cash prize
Award	Film	Producer	Director	Cash prize
Best Feature Film in Chhattisgarhi	Bhulan The Maze	Swapnil Film Productions	Manoj Verma	₹1,00,000 each
Best Feature Film in Haryanvi	Chhoriyan Chhoron Se Kam Nahi Hoti	• Vision Productions Limited • Satish Kaushik Entertainment	Rajesh Amar Lal Babbar	₹1,00,000 each
Best Feature Film in Khasi	Iewduh	Shiven Arts	Pradip Kurbah	₹1,00,000 each
Best Feature Film in Mising	Anu Ruwad	Obonori Pictures	Dilip Kumar Doley	₹1,00,000 each
Best Feature Film in Paniya	Kenjira	Neru Films	Manoj Kana	₹1,00,000 each
Best Feature Film in Tulu	Pingara	DMR Productions	R. Preetham Shetty	₹1,00,000 each

== Non-Feature Films ==
Short Films made in any Indian language and certified by the Central Board of Film Certification as a documentary/newsreel/fiction are eligible for non-feature film section.

=== Jury ===
• Arun Chaddha (Chairman)
• Sesino Yhoshü	• Meena Longjam
• Sriprakash Menon	• Sushil Rajpal
• Harish Bhimani	• Sanjib Parasar

=== Golden Lotus Award ===
Official Name: Swarna Kamal

All the awardees are awarded with 'Golden Lotus Award (Swarna Kamal)', a certificate and cash prize.

Award	Film	Language	Awardee(s)	Cash prize
Best Non-Feature Film	An Engineered Dream	Hindi	Hemant Gaba	₹1,50,000 each
Best Director in Non-Feature Film	Knock Knock Knock	English; Bengali	Sudhanshu Saria	₹1,50,000

=== Silver Lotus Award ===
Official Name: Rajat Kamal

All the Awardees are awarded with 'Silver Lotus Award (Rajat Kamal)' and cash prize.

Award	Film	Language	Awardee(s)	Cash prize
Best Debut Non-Feature Film of A Director	Khisa	Marathi	Producer : Santosh Maithani; Director: Raj Pritam More	₹ 75,000/- each
Best Biographical Film	Elephants Do Remember	English	Producer: Films Division; Director: Swati Pandey; Viplove Rai Bhatia; Manohar Singh Bisht	₹ 50,000/- each
Best Arts / Cultural Film	Shrikshetra Ru Sahijata	Odia	Director and Producer: Ashutosh Pattnaik	₹ 50,000/- each
Best Environment Film	The Stork Saviours	Hindi	Producer: Rajiv Mehrotra; PSBT; Director: Ajay Bedi; Vijay Bedi	₹ 50,000/- each
Best Promotional Film	The Shower	Hindi	Producer: Little Lamb Films Pvt. Ltd. Director: Bauddhayan Mukherji	₹ 50,000/- each
Best Film on Social Issues	Holy Rights	Hindi	Producer: Priyanka Pradeep More; Director: Farha Khatun; Producer & Director: Sudipta Kundu	₹ 50,000/- each
Best Educational Film	Apples and Oranges	English	Producer: LXL Ideas Private Limited; Director: Rukshana Tabassum	₹ 50,000/- each
Best Ethnographic Film	Charan - Atva the Essene of Being A Nomad	Gujarati	Producer: Films Division; Director: Dinaz Kalwachwala	₹ 50,000/- each
Best Exploration Film	Wild Karnataka	English	Producer: Amoghavarsha J. S. Director: Amoghavarsha J. S.; Kalyan Varma; Sarath Champati; Vijaya Mohan Raj	₹ 50,000/- each
Best Investigative Film	Jakkal	Marathi	Producer: Neon Reel Creation; Director: Vivek Wagh	₹ 50,000/- each
Best Animation Film	Radha (Musical)		Producer: Fairy Cows; Director: Bimal Poddar; Animator: Nitin Kharkar	₹ 50,000/- each
Best Short Fiction Film	Custody	English; Hindi	Producer & Director: Ambiecka Pandit	₹ 50,000/- each
Best Film on Family Values	Oru Paathiraa Swapnam Pole	Malayalam	Producer: Satyajit Ray Film & Television Institute; Director: Sharan Venugopal	₹ 50,000/- each
Best Cinematography	Sonsi	Hindi	Savita Singh	₹ 50,000/- each
Best Audiography	Radha (Musical)		Re-recordist (final mixed track): Allwin Rego; Sanjay Maurya	₹ 50,000/-
Best On-Location Sound Recordist	Rahas	Hindi	Saptarshi Sarkar	₹ 50,000/-
Best Editing	Shut Up Sona	Hindi; English	Arjun Gourisaria	₹ 50,000/-
Best Music Direction	Kranti Darshi Guruji - Ahead of Times	Hindi	Bishakh Jyoti	₹ 50,000/-
Best Narration / Voice Over	Wild Karnataka	English	David Attenborough	₹ 50,000/-
Special Jury Award	Small Scale Societies	English	Vipin Vijay	₹ 1,00,000/-

== Best Writing on Cinema ==
The awards aim at encouraging study and appreciation of cinema as an art form and dissemination of information and critical appreciation of this art-form through publication of books, articles, reviews etc.

=== Jury ===
A committee of three, headed by Utpal Borpujari was appointed to evaluate the nominations for the best writing on Indian cinema. The jury members were as follows:

• Saibal Chatterjee (Chairman)
• Raghavendra Patil	• Rajeev Masand

=== Golden Lotus Award ===
Official Name: Swarna Kamal

All the awardees are awarded with the Golden Lotus Award (Swarna Kamal) accompanied with a cash prize.

Award	Book	Language	Awardee(s)	Cash prize
Best Book on Cinema	A Gandhian Affair: India's Curios Portrayal of Love in Cinema	Malayalam	Publisher: HarperCollins Publishers India; Author: Sanjay Suri	₹ 75,000/- each
Best Film Critic	—N/a	English	Sohini Chattopadhyay	₹ 75,000/-

=== Special Mention ===
All the awardees are awarded with a certificate.

Award	Book	Language	Awardee(s)	Cash prize
Book on Cinema	Cinema Pahanara Manus	Marathi	Ashok Rane	Certificate Only
Book on Cinema	Kannada Cinema:Jagathika Cinema Vikasa Prerane Prabhava	Kannada	P. R. Ramadasa Naidu	Certificate Only
