= Mujeeb Jaihoon =

Writer

- Born: Edappal, Kerala, India
- Occupations: Writer, Community activist
- Known for: Literary works
- Notable work: Slogans of the Sage, The Cool Breeze From Hind
- Awards: Sri Narayana Guru Shreshda Puraskaram (2022)

Mujeeb Jaihoon is an Indian-born writer and community activist based in the United Arab Emirates. He is known for his literary works, including the books Slogans of the Sage and The Cool Breeze From Hind. Jaihoon's writings have been translated into Italian, Arabic, and Malayalam.

== Literary works ==
Jaihoon has authored several books, including Slogans of the Sage, an illustrated coffee table book of aphorisms. One of his notable works is Mission Nizamuddin, Twitter-based micro travelogues across North India. Additionally, he has published several collections of poetry.
