= Apples and Oranges (film) =

Educational film

- Written by: Rukshana Tabassum
- Starring: Daisy and Tulip
- Release date: 2018
- Country: India
- Language: English

Apple and Oranges is an educational short film written and directed by Rukshana Tabassum and produced by the School Cinema division of LXL Ideas. The film has won two national awards at the 67th National Film Awards. This short film is a story for children on being different, accepting and dealing with diversity.

== Story ==
The film is set in a fantasy world named 'Fruitistan' where two sets of people, apples and oranges, don't get along with each other. Daisy who likes apple presents oranges to orange-loving Tulip on her birthday. Tulip's family arranges ‘apple foods’ for Daisy.

== Awards ==
In 2019, the film won two National Awards for Best Educational Film.
