= Sonsi =

Indian short film directed by Savita Singh

- Directed by: Savita Singh
- Produced by: Sharib Khan and Vikas Kumar
- Starring: Aarohi Radhakrishnan and Jameel Khan Pooja Shyam Prabhat Prabhat Raghunandan
- Cinematography: Savita Singh
- Release date: 2020
- Running time: 25 minutes
- Country: India

Sonsi (transl. Shadow Bird) is an Indian short film produced by Sharib Khan and actor Vikas Kumar under the banner of Khan & Kumar Media Pvt. Ltd. and released in 2020. It stars actors Aarohi Radhakrishnan and Jameel Khan. The film won a National Film Award for Best Non-Feature Film Cinematography at the 67th National Film Awards and was awarded the "Best Short Film" title at the Lady Filmmakers Festival held in Beverly Hills. After winning the Best Film award at the Bengaluru International Short Film Festival, the film was also among the shortlisted entries for the Oscars in the Shorts section. The film is directed by Savita Singh and inspired by stories from her childhood, and the skewed gender roles in the film industry. The movie's name is derived from Vinod Kumar Shukla's Hindi literary work titled "Deewar Mein Ek Khidki Rehti Thi" (A Window Lived in A Wall), which received the Sahitya Akademi Award for the best Hindi literature in 1999.

== Synopsis ==
The movie follows the journey of Nadi (Arohi Radhakrishnan), an eight-year-old girl who spends the entire movie in a dream-like state, somewhere between her conscious and subconscious mind. In this state, she eagerly anticipates meeting her shadow bird, Sonsi. The village also has a timekeeper, whose heart is fitted with a clock. The village only wakes up when the timekeeper arrives. One day, the timekeeper, also known as Ghadi baabu, fails to show up, and Nadi's shadow bird disappears. Distraught and confused, Nadi decides to follow a trail of clues into the forest.

== Awards ==
Year	Ceremony	Category	Result	Ref.
2020	67th National Film Awards	National Film Award for Best Non-Feature Film Cinematography	Won	
2020	Lady Filmmakers Festival	Best Short Film	Won	
2020	Bengaluru International Short Film Festival	Best Film award	Won	
2020	Oscars	Shortlisted	Nominated	
