= National Film Award for Best Educational/Motivational/Instructional Film =

Indian film award

- National award for contributions to short film
- Sponsored by: Directorate of Film Festivals
- Formerly called: Best Educational Film (1960–1967); Best Educational/Instructional Film (1968–1985); Best Educational/Motivational Film (1986–1988)
- Rewards: Rajat Kamal (Silver Lotus); ₹50,000
- First award: 1960
- Final award: 2021
- Most recent winner: Sirpigalin Sirpangal

Highlights
- Total awarded: 55
- First winner: Pond Culture

The National Film Award for Best Educational/Motivational/Instructional Film was one of the National Film Awards presented annually by the Directorate of Film Festivals, the organisation set up by Ministry of Information and Broadcasting, India. It was one of several awards presented for non-feature films and awarded with Rajat Kamal (Silver Lotus).

The award was instituted in 1960, at 8th National Film Awards and awarded annually for the short films produced in the year across the country, in all Indian languages. At the 70th National Film Awards, the award is discontinued and clubbed with National Film Award for Best Promotional Film, National Film Award for Best Scientific Film, National Film Award for Best Investigative Film, National Film Award for Best Exploration/Adventure Film, National Film Award for Best Anthropological/Ethnographic Film, National Film Award for Best Agriculture Film, National Film Award for Best Non-Feature Environment/Conservation/Preservation Film and National Film Award for Best Film on Social Issues, and two new categories were created; Best Documentary and Best Non Feature Film Promoting Social and Environmental Values.

== Winners ==
Award includes 'Rajat Kamal' (Silver Lotus) and cash prize. Following are the award winners over the years:

Awards legends
*	President's Silver Medal for Best Educational/Motivational/Instructional Film
*	Certificate of Merit for the Second Best Educational/Motivational/Instructional Film
*	Certificate of Merit for the Third Best Educational/Motivational/Instructional Film
*	Certificate of Merit for the Best Educational/Motivational/Instructional Film
*	Indicates a joint award for that year

List of award recipients, showing the year, film(s), language(s), producer(s) and director(s)
Year	Film	Language	Producer	Director	Refs.
1960 (8th)	Pond Culture	English	Films Division	N. K. Issar	
1960 (8th)	Cotton	English	Films Division	Krishna Kapil	
1960 (8th)	Wheat	English	Films Division	Krishna Kapil	
1961 (9th)	Citrus Cultivation	English	Films Division	Krishna Kapil	
1961 (9th)	Coir Worker	English	F. R. Bilimoria	F. R. Bilimoria	
1961 (9th)	Ahvan	Hindi	Dhruva Kumar Pandya	Dhruva Kumar Pandya	
1962 (10th)	Virginia Tobacco	English	Films Division	P. R. S. Pillay	
1962 (10th)	The Evolution and Races of Man	English	National Education and Information Film Ltd.	S. Sukhdev	
1963 (11th)	Indian Ocean Expedition	Hindi	Children's Film Society	Shanti S. Verma	
1964 (12th)	Sterilisation of the Female	Hindi	Films Division	G. H. Saraiya	
1965 (13th)	Play Better Hockey	English	Children's Film Society	Shanti S. Verma	
1966 (14th)					
1967 (15th)	Akbar	English	J. S. Bhownagary for Films Division	Shanti S. Varma	
1968 (16th)	Forest and The Man	English	K. L. Khandpur for Films Division	• Neil Gokhale • P. B. Pendharkar	
1969 (17th)	Life	English	K. L. Khandpur for Films Division	S. Gangooii	
1970 (18th)	No Award				
1971 (19th)					
1972 (20th)	No Award				
1973 (21st)	Sath Kutch Na Jayega	Hindi	• Dhiru Mistry • Sureshwar Singh	• Dhiru Mistry • Sureshwar Singh	
1974 (22nd)	Atoms	English	(Late) Pramod Pati for Films Division	M. M. Chaudhuri of I. I. T., Kanpur	
1975 (23rd)	Induced Breeding	English	K. K. Kapil	Suraj Joshi	
1976 (24th)					
1977 (25th)	Tobacco Habits and Oral Cancer	English	A. V. Films	Arun Khopkar	
1978 (26th)	The Magic Hands	English	M/s Little Cinema	Santi P. Chowdhury	
1979 (27th)					
1980 (28th)	Mariculture	English	Films Division	C. J. Paulose	
1981 (29th)	The Four Minutes	English	Vijay B. Chandra for Films Division	B. G. Devare	
1982 (30th)	Kooduthal Paal Venamenkil	Malayalam	Kerala State Film Development Corporation	V. R. Gopinath	
1983 (31st)	Oval Crop	English	Radha Narayanan	Mohi-ud-Din Mirza	
1984 (32nd)	No Award				
1985 (33rd)	No Award				
1986 (34th)	Mitraniketan Vellanad	English	Cinemart Foundation	Jagannath Guha	
1986 (34th)	For Better Living	English	• Padmalaya Mohapatra • Ghanashyam Mohapatra	Ghanashyam Mohapatra	
1987 (35th)	Paani	Marathi	Sumitra Bhave	Sumitra Bhave	
1988 (36th)	Chitthi	Hindi	Cinemart Foundation	Suhasini Mulay	
1989 (37th)	Ser Alang	Karbi	Horticulturist, Karbi Anglong	Indrajit Narayan Deb	
1989 (37th)	Yun Sikhlayen Akhar	Hindi	Ramesh Asher Films	Ramesh Asher	
1990 (38th)	Ducks Out of Water	English	D. Gautaman	Raj Gopal Rao	
1990 (38th)	Natun Asha	Assamese	Beauty Sabhapandit	Arup Borthakur	
1991 (39th)	A Story of Triumph	English	Poona District Leprosy Committee	Vishram Revankar	
1992 (40th)	Kalarippayat	English	P. Ashok Kumar	P. Ashok Kumar	
1992 (40th)	Towards Joy and Freedom	English	Haimanti Banerjee	Haimanti Banerjee	
1993 (41st)	AIDS	Malayalam	• Nooranad Ramachandran • Ganab Baby • Ochira Sathar	Nooranad Ramachandran	
1994 (42nd)	News Magazine No. 268 (A) Plague: Curable and Preventable	Hindi	R. Krishna Mohan	Mahesh P. Sinha	
1995 (43rd)	Home Away From Home	English	V. B. Joshi	Late Vishram Revankar	
1996 (44th)	Rabia Chalikkunnu	Malayalam	Abraham Benhur	Ali Akbar	
1997 (45th)	Nirankush	Hindi	Venu Arora	Venu Arora	
1998 (46th)	Silent Scream	English	Vivek K. Kumar	Vikram Kumar	
1999 (47th)	No Award				
2000 (48th)	Tulasi	English	Bhanumurthy Alur for Films Division	Rajgopal Rao for Films Division	
2001 (49th)	Kanavu Malayilekku	Malayalam	Tomy Mathew	M. G. Sasi	
2002 (50th)	No Award				
2003 (51st)	Fiddlers on the Thatch	English	Rajiv Mehrotra	Trisha Das	
2004 (52nd)	No Award				
2005 (53rd)	No Award				
2006 (54th)	Filariasis	English	A. S. Nagaraju	M. Elango	
2007 (55th)	Prarambha	Kannada	Santosh Sivan	Santosh Sivan	
2008 (56th)	Polio Vs. Polio Victims	• English • Hindi • Marathi	Gulshan Sachdeva	Aman Sachdeva	
2009 (57th)	No Award				
2010 (58th)	Advaitham	Telugu	K. Vijaypal Reddy	Pradeep Maadugula	
2011 (59th)	A Drop of Sunshine	English	Public Service Broadcasting Trust	Aparna Sanyal	
2012 (60th)	No Award				
2013 (61st)	The Quantum Indians	English	Public Service Broadcasting Trust	Raja Choudhury	
2014 (62nd)	Komal	English	Climb Media India Pvt. Ltd.	Prashant Shikare	
2014 (62nd)	Behind the Glass Wall	English	Gaahimedia	Aruna Raje Patil	
2015 (63rd)	Paywat	Marathi	Mithunchandra Chaudhari	• Nayana Dolas • Mithunchandra Chaudhari	
2016 (64th)	The Water Fall	English	Syed Sultan Ahmed	Lipika Singh Darai	
2017 (65th)	The Little Girl We Were and the Women We Are		Rahi Foundation	Vaishali Sood	
2018 (66th)	Sarala Virala	Kannada	H. R. Sujatha	Eregowda	
2019 (67th)	Apples and Oranges	English	LXL Ideas	Rukshana Tabassum	
2020 (68th)	Dreaming of Words	• Malayalam • Tamil	Nandan	Nandan	
2021 (69th)	Sirpigalin Sirpangal	Tamil	KKV Media Venture	B. Lenin	
