= Indian literature =

Indian literature refers to the literature produced on the Indian subcontinent until 1947 and in the Republic of India thereafter. The Eighth Schedule to the Constitution of India has 22 officially recognised languages. Sahitya Akademi, India's highest literary body, also has 24 recognised literary languages.

The earliest works of Indian literature were orally transmitted. Sanskrit literature begins with the oral literature of the Rig Veda, a collection of literature dating to the period 1500–1200 BCE. The Sanskrit epics Ramayana and Mahabharata were subsequently codified and appeared towards the end of the 2nd millennium BCE. Classical Sanskrit literature developed rapidly during the first few centuries of the first millennium BCE, as did the Pāli Canon and Tamil Sangam literature. Ancient Meitei appeared in the 1st century CE with sacred musical compositions like the Ougri, and heroic narratives like the Numit Kappa. In the medieval period, literature in Kannada and Telugu appeared in the 9th and 10th centuries, respectively. Later, literature in Marathi, Gujarati, Bengali, Assamese, Odia, and Maithili appeared. Thereafter literature in various dialects of Hindi, Persian and Urdu began to appear as well. In 1913, Bengali poet Rabindranath Tagore became India's first Nobel laureate in literature.

== In archaic and ancient Indian languages ==
=== Sanskrit literature ===
==== Vedic literature ====
Examples of early works written in Vedic Sanskrit include, the core Vedas and Upanishads. Other examples include the Sulba Sutras, which are some of the earliest texts on geometry.

==== Epic Sanskrit literature ====
Ved Vyasa's Mahabharata and Valmiki's Ramayana, written in Epic Sanskrit, are regarded as the greatest Sanskrit epics.

==== Classical Sanskrit literature ====
The famous poet and playwright Kālidāsa wrote one epic: Raghuvamsha (Dynasty of Raghu); it was written in Classical Sanskrit rather than Epic Sanskrit. Other examples of works written in Classical Sanskrit include the Pāṇini's Ashtadhyayi, which standardised the grammar and phonetics of Classical Sanskrit. The Laws of Manu (मनुस्मृति) is a famous text in Hinduism. Kālidāsa is often considered to be the greatest playwright in Sanskrit literature and one of the greatest poets in Sanskrit literature; his Recognition of Shakuntala (अभिज्ञानशाकुन्तलम्) and Meghaduuta are Kalidasa's most famous play and poem respectively. Other famous plays include Mricchakatika by Shudraka, Svapna Vasavadattam by Bhasa, and Ratnavali by Sri Harsha. Later poetic works include Gita Govinda by Jayadeva. Some other famous works are Chanakya's Arthashastra and Vatsyayana's Kamasutra.

=== Ancient Meitei literature ===
"The beginning of this old Manipuri literature (as in the case of Newari) may go back to 1500 years, or even 2000 years, from now."

— Suniti Kumar Chatterji, Padma Vibhushan awardee Indian scholar

Some of the ancient literature of Meitei language (also known as Manipuri language) include the Ougri (c. 1st century CE musical composition), the Numit Kappa (c. 1st century CE narrative work), the Poireiton Khunthok (c. 3rd century CE narrative work), the Khencho (pre-7th century CE musical composition), 6th-7th century CE copper plate inscriptions of king Khongtekcha, the Panthoibi Khonggul (c. 8th century CE narrative work), the Loiyumpa Silyel (c. Written Constitution drafted in 429 CE, and finalised in 11th-12th century CE), etc.

=== Prakrit literature ===
Many of Aśvaghoṣa's plays were written in Shauraseni as were a sizable number of Jain works and Rajasekhara's Karpuramanjari. Canto 13 of the Bhaṭṭikāvya is written in what is called "like the vernacular" (bhāṣāsama), that is, it can be read in two languages simultaneously: Prakrit and Sanskrit.

=== Pali literature ===
The canonical Pali literature includes Buddhist discourses (suttas), Abhidharma works, poetry, works on monastic discipline (vinaya), and the Jataka tales.

=== Tamil literature ===
==== Sangam literature ====
The Sangam literature (Tamil: சங்க இலக்கியம், Sanga ilakkiyam) is the ancient Tamil literature of the period in the history of South India (known as the Thamizhagam or the Tamilagam) spanning from c. 300 BCE to 300 CE (Akananuru (1, 15, 31, 55, 61, 65, 91, 97, 101, 115, 127, 187, 197, 201, 211, 233, 251, 265, 281, 311, 325, 331, 347, 349, 359, 393, 281, 295), Kurunthogai (11), Natrinai (14, 75) are dated before 300 BCE). This collection contains 2381 poems in Tamil composed by 473 poets, some 102 of whom remain anonymous.

Most of the available Sangam literature is from the Third Sangam, this period is known as the Sangam period, which refers to the prevalent Sangam legends claiming literary academies lasting thousands of years, giving the name to the corpus of literature. The Only religious poems among the shorter poems occur in paripaatal. The rest of the corpus of Sangam literature deals with human relationship and emotions.

Sangam literature deals with emotional and material topics such as love, war, governance, trade and bereavement. Some of the greatest Tamil scholars, like Thiruvalluvar, who wrote on ethics, and on the various issues of life like virtue, wealth and love, or the Tamil poet Mamulanar, who explored historical incidents that happened in India, lived during the Sangam period.

==== Bhakti literature ====
The Bhakti Movement was a significant religious movement in medieval Hinduism that sought to bring religious reforms to all strata of society by adopting the method of devotion to achieve salvation. Originating in Tamilakam during 6th century CE, it gained prominence through the poems and teachings of the Vaishnava Alvars and Shaiva Nayanars before spreading northwards. It swept over east and north India from the 15th century onwards, reaching its zenith between the 15th and 17th century CE. From the 14th to the 18th centuries, India's literary traditions went through a period of drastic change because of the spread of the Bhakti movement in the northern parts of India, resulting in the emergence of devotional poets like Kabīr, Tulsīdās, and Guru Nānak. This period was characterised by a varied and wide spectrum of thought and expression; as a consequence, medieval Indian literary works differed significantly from classical traditions.

== In modern Indian languages ==
=== Sahitya Akademi recognised & scheduled languages ===
==== Assamese literature ====
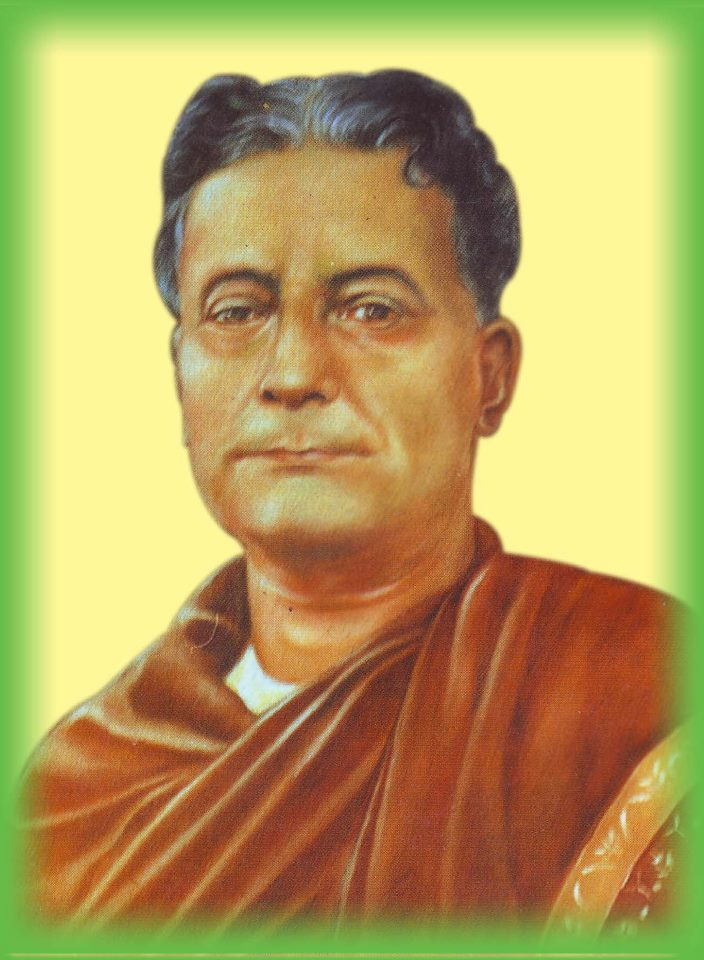
Lakshminath Bezbaroa, Assamese poet, novelist and playwright of modern Assamese literature

The Buddhist Charyapadas are often cited as the earliest example of Assamese literature. The Charyapadas are Vajrayana Buddhist songs composed in the 8th to 12th centuries. These writings bear similarities to Oriya and Bengali languages as well. The phonological and morphological traits of these songs, some of which are extant, bear very strong resemblance to Assamese.

A comprehensive introductory book Assamese Language-Literature & Sahityarathi Lakshminath Bezbaroa originally authored by leading Assamese littérateur of Awahon-Ramdhenu Era and pioneer Assam economist Bhabananda Deka together with his three deputies, Parikshit Hazarika, Upendra Nath Goswami and Prabhat Chandra Sarma, was published in 1968. This book was officially released in New Delhi on 24 Nov 1968 by then President of India Zakir Husain in commemoration of the birth centenary celebration of doyen of Assamese literature Lakshminath Bezbaroa. After almost half a century, this historic book has been recovered and re-edited by Assamese award-winning short-story writer & novelist Arnab Jan Deka, which was published by Assam Foundation-India in 2014.

==== Bengali literature ====
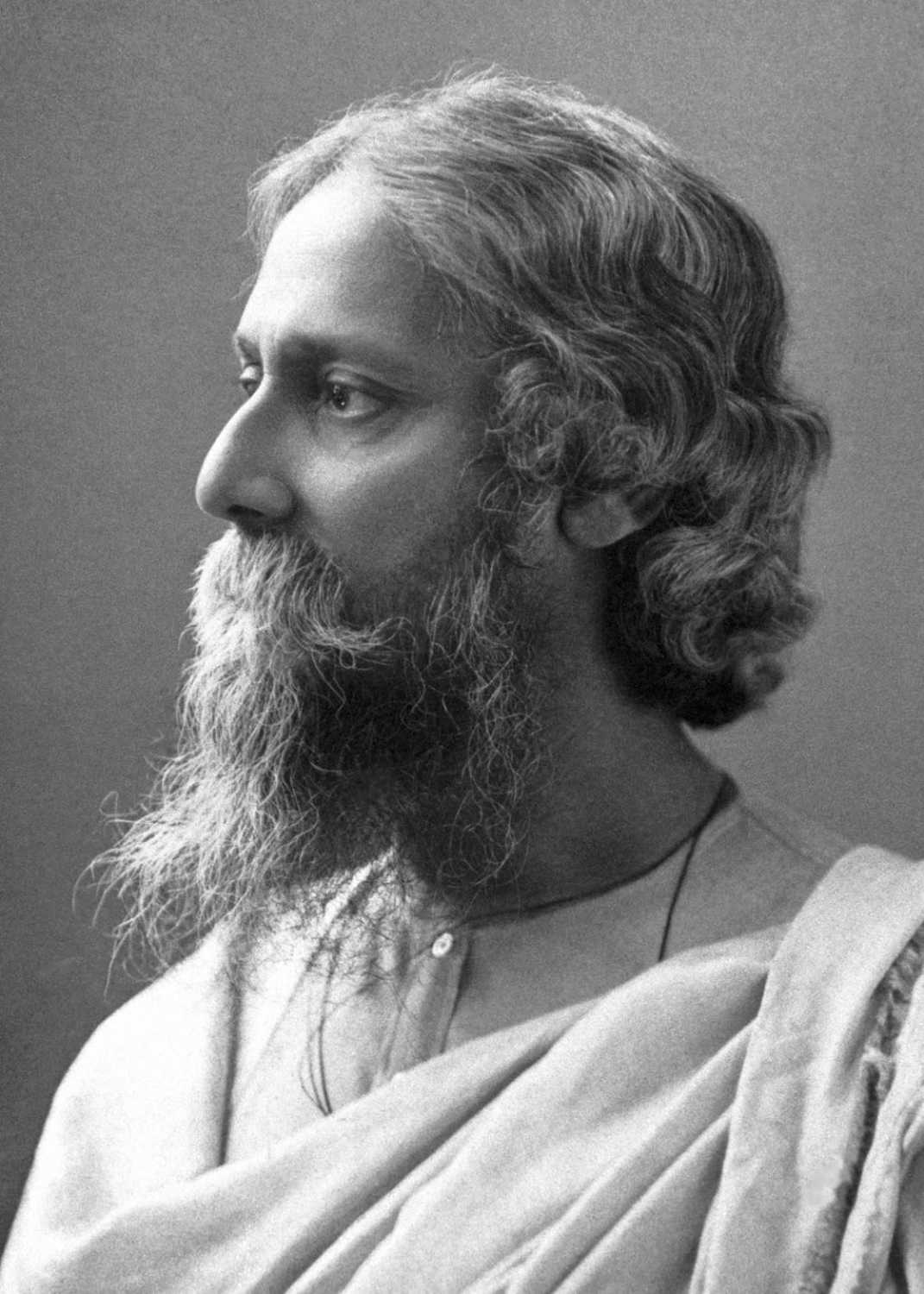
Rabindranath Tagore, the author of many works, including Gitanjali and India's national anthem 'Jana Gana Mana'. He was awarded the Nobel Prize in Literature in 1913 for "his profoundly sensitive, fresh and beautiful verse, by which, with consummate skill, he has made his poetic thought, expressed in his own English words, a part of the literature of the West." He was the first person of non-European lineage to win a Nobel Prize.

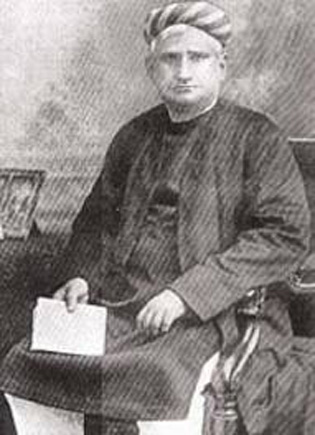
Bankim Chandra Chatterjee, the author of India's National Song 'Vande Mataram'.

The first evidence of Bengali literature is known as Charyapada or Charyageeti, which were Buddhist hymns from the 8th century. Charyapada is in the oldest known written form of Bengali. The famous Bengali linguist Hara Prasad Shastri discovered the palm leaf Charyapada manuscript in the Nepal Royal Court Library in 1907. The most internationally famous Bengali writer is Nobel laureate Rabindranath Tagore, who received the Nobel Prize for Literature in 1913 for his work "Gitanjali". He wrote the national anthem of India and Bangladesh namely, "Jana Gana Mana" and "Amar Sonar Bangla", respectively. He was the first Asian who won the Nobel Prize. Rabindranath has written an enormous number of poems, songs, essays, novels, plays and short stories. His songs remain popular and are still widely sung in Bengal.

==== Hindi literature ====
Hindi literature started as religious and philosophical poetry in medieval periods in dialects like Avadhi and Brij. The most famous figures from this period are Kabir and Tulsidas. In modern times, the Dehlavi dialect of the Hindi Belt became more prominent than Sanskrit.

==== Gujarati literature ====
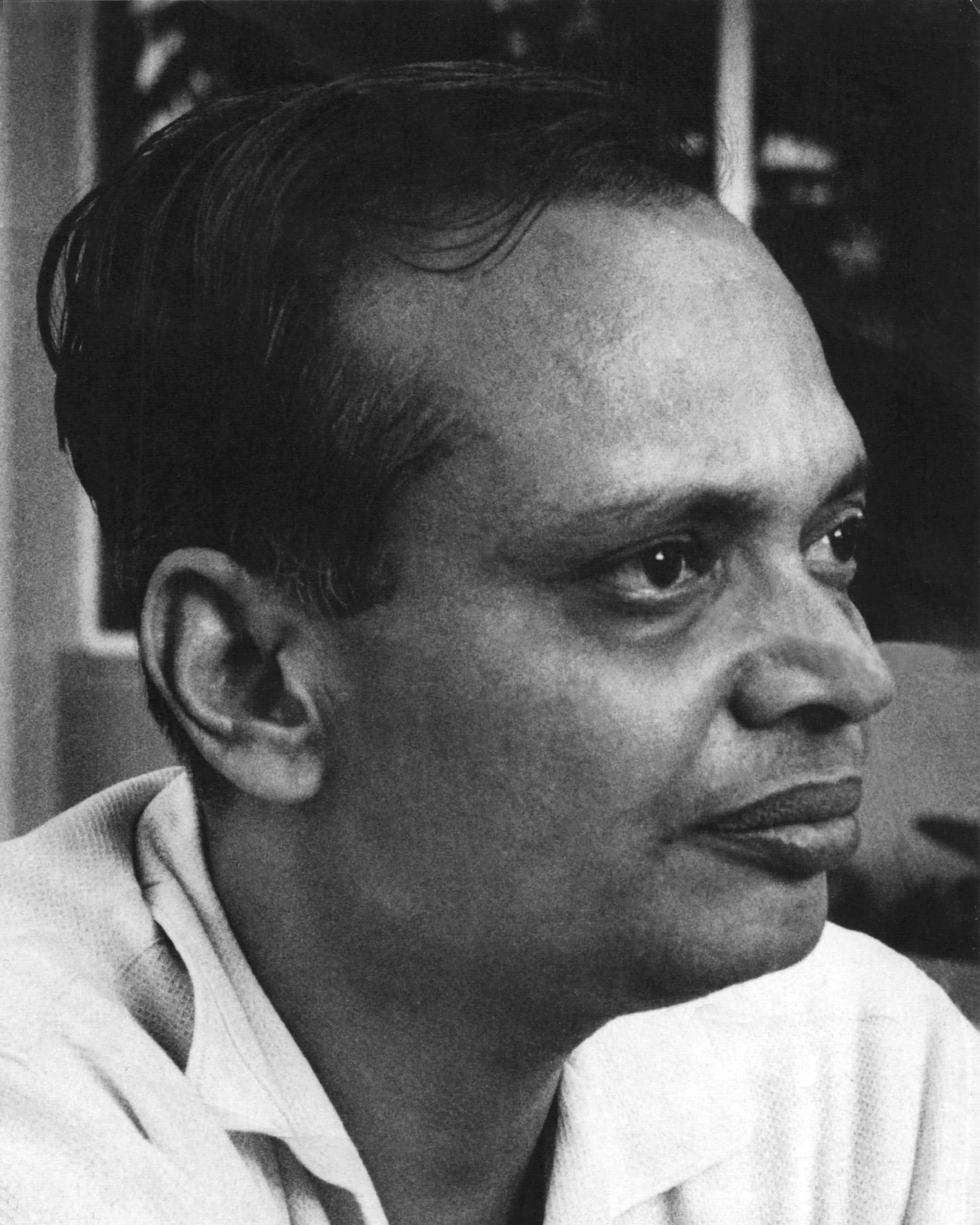
Suresh Joshi is known as father of modern Gujarati literature.

Gujarati literature's history may be traced to 1000 CE.

==== Kannada literature ====
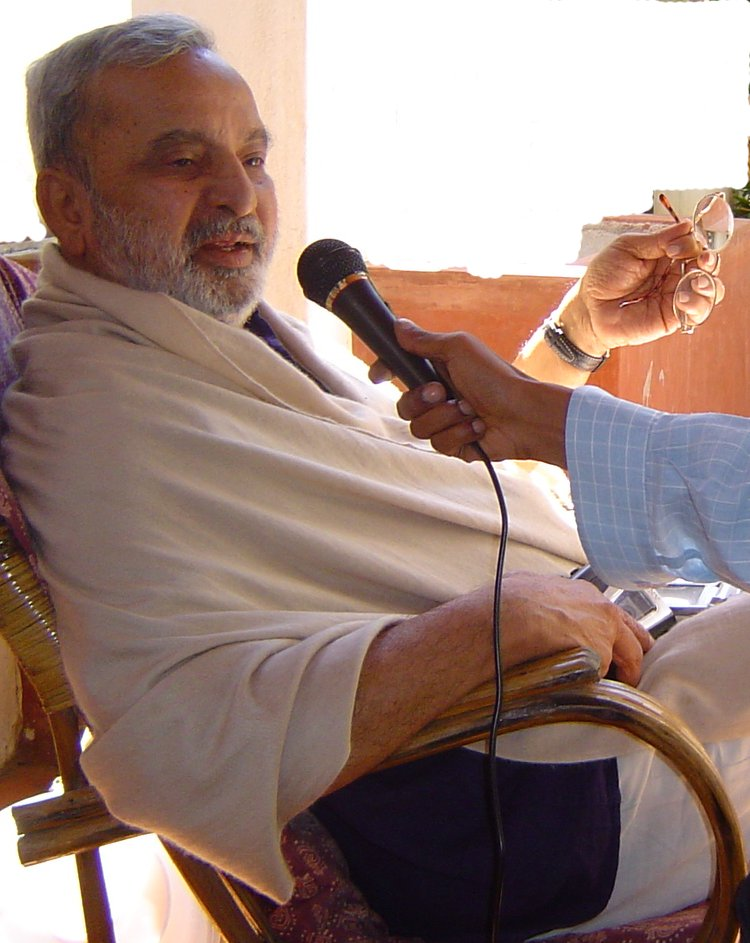
Kannada writer and Jnanpith Award winner for the year 1994, U. R. Ananthamurthy

The oldest existing record of Kannada prose is the Halmidi inscription of 450 CE, and poetry in tripadi metre is the Kappe Arabhatta record of 700 CE. The folk form of literature began earlier than any other literature in Kannada. Gajashtaka (800 CE) by King Shivamara II, Chudamani (650 CE) by Thumbalacharya are examples of early literature now considered extinct. Kavirajamarga by King Nripatunga Amoghavarsha I (850 CE) is the earliest existing literary work in Kannada. It is a writing on literary criticism and poetics meant to standardise various written Kannada dialects used in literature in previous centuries. The book makes reference to Kannada works by early writers such as King Durvinita of the 6th century and Ravikirti, the author of the Aihole record of 636 CE. An early extant prose work, the Vaddaradhane by Shivakotiacharya of 900 CE provides an elaborate description of the life of Bhadrabahu of Shravanabelagola. Since the earliest available Kannada work is one on grammar and a guide of sorts to unify existing variants of Kannada grammar and literary styles, it can be safely assumed that literature in Kannada must have started several centuries earlier. Pampa who popularised Champu style in Karnataka wrote the epic "Vikramarjuna Vijaya". He also wrote "Adipurana". Other famous poets like Ponna wrote "shantinatapurana", "Bhuvanaikaramabhyudaya", "Jinaksharamale", and "gatapratyagata". Ranna wrote "Shantipurana" and "Ghadayudha". The Jain poet Nagavarma II wrote "Kavyavalokana", "Karnatabhashabhushana" and "Vardhamanapurana" . Janna was the author of "Yashodhara Charitha". Rudhrabhatta and Durgashima wrote "Jagannatha Vijaya" and "Panchatantra" respectively. The works of the medieval period are based on Jain and Hindu principles. The Vachana Sahitya tradition of the 12th century is purely native and unique in world literature.

==== Konkani literature ====
Konkani is a language with a complex and much-contested history. It is one of the few Indian languages to be written in five scripts—Roman, Nagari, Kannada, Persian-Arabic and Malayalam-and also has an extensive oral literature.

==== Malayalam literature ====
Even up to 500 years since the start of the Malayalam calendar which commenced in 825 CE, Malayalam literature remained in preliminary stage. During this time, Malayalam literature consisted mainly of various genres of songs.

==== Maithili literature ====
Maithili literature is the entire collection of poetry, novels, short stories, documents and other writings in the Maithili language.

The Maithili script, Mithilakshara or Tirhuta as it is popularly known, is of a great antiquity. The Lalitavistara mentions the Vaidehi script. Early in the latter half of the 7th century CE, a marked change occurred in the northeastern alphabet, and the inscriptions of Adityasena exhibit this change for the first time. The eastern variety develops and becomes the Maithili script, which comes into use in Assam, Bengal, and Nepal. The earliest recorded epigraphic evidence of the script is found in the Mandar Hill Stone inscriptions of Adityasena in the 7th century CE, now fixed in the Baidyanath temple of Deoghar.

The language of the Buddhist dohas is described as belonging to the mixed Maithili—Kamrupi language.

==== Modern Meitei literature ====
Modern Meitei literature, the descendant of Ancient Meitei literature, is written in modern Meitei language (also known as Manipuri language), composed by writers from Manipur, Assam, Tripura, Myanmar and Bangladesh. The history of Meitei literature can be traced back to thousands of years with the flourish of Meitei civilization. Khamba Thoibi Sheireng (Meitei for 'Epic of Khamba Thoibi'), the third longest Indian epic poem, next to the Mahabharata and the Ramayana, is a Meitei epic poem, based on the classic tale of Khamba and Thoibi, having 39,000 lines, is regarded as the national epic of the Manipuris.

==== Marathi literature ====
Marathi literature began with saint-poets like Dnyaneshwar, Tukaram, Ramdas, and Eknath. Modern Marathi literature was marked by a theme of social reform.

==== Odia literature ====
Odia is another ancient and rich language among the various language groups in the Indian subcontinent. Ashokan Inscriptions of 3rd cenctury BC at Dhauli and Jaugarh is the ancient unchanged evidence of Odia language. Odia language literary history started with the Kharavel's Hatigumpha inscription (40 B.C.) was the real evidence of past Odia cultural, political, ritual and social status and it is the first poetic stake inscription. Though Ashoka created many rock edicts and inscriptions before Kharavela, his instructions for administration were written in a rude and chocked language. On the other hand, the Hatigumpha inscriptions show the flexibility of a language in a sweet flow. The buddhist charyapadas written in the 7th century CE on the period of Bhauma-Kara dynasty . Odia has a rich literary heritage, the medieval period dating back to the 13th century. Sarala Das who lived in the 14th century is known as the Vyasa of Odisha. He translated the Mahabharata into Odia.

==== Punjabi literature ====
The first work considered to be Punjabi literature is the 16th century biography of Guru Nanak, Janam-sakhi, written by his companion Bhai Bala. However, some say that Punjabi literature may have evolved much earlier, perhaps in the 9th or 10th centuries, based on the high level of Punjabi poetry written by Baba Farid, Guru Nanak, and Bhai Gurdas. Baba Farid (1173–1266) is often considered the first major Punjabi poet, and his Sufi poetry was compiled after his death in the Adi Granth.

Wikipedia

==== Tamil literature ====
Tamil literature has a rich and long literary tradition spanning more than 2500 years (Sangam period: 5th century BCE-3rd century CE.) Tolkaappiyam (3rd century BCE) has been credited as the oldest work in Tamil available today.

==== Telugu literature ====
Telugu, the Indian language with the third largest number of speakers (after Hindi & Bengali), is rich in literary traditions. Literature has existed from 300 BCE in the form of inscriptions. The earliest written literature dates back to the 7th century CE.

==== Urdu literature ====
Among other traditions, Urdu poetry is a fine example of linguistic and cultural synthesis. Arab and Persian vocabulary based on the Hindi language resulted in a vast and popular class of ghazal literature, usually written by Muslims in contexts ranging from romance and society to philosophy and Tassawuf (Sufism).

=== Sahitya Akademi recognised but non scheduled languages ===
==== Indian English literature ====
In the 20th century, several Indian writers have distinguished themselves not only in traditional Indian languages but also in English, a language inherited from the British. As a result of British colonisation, India has developed its own unique dialect of English known as Indian English.

=== Non Sahitya Akademi recognised & non scheduled languages ===
==== Chhattisgarhi literature ====
Literature in Chhattisgarh reflects the regional consciousness and the evolution of an identity distinct from others in Central India.

==== Kodava literature ====
When Kodava was written, it was usually with Kannada script, sometimes with minor modifications.

==== Mizo literature ====
Mizo literature is the literature written in Mizo ṭtawng, the principal language of the Mizo peoples, which has both written and oral traditions. It has undergone a considerable change in the 20th century. The language developed mainly from the Lushai language, with significant influence from Pawi language, Paite language and Hmar language, especially at the literary level.

==== Nagpuri literature ====
Nagpuri literature refers to literature in the Nagpuri language, the language of Jharkhand, Chhattisgarh and Odisha. The earliest literature started in the nagpuri language when the Nagvanshi king and king of Ramgarh Raj started writing poetry in the 17th century. Since then, various literature has been written. Although in the present century, Nagpuri was never considered worthy of literary development, a small but dedicated writers have engaged in writing short stories, plays and poetry.

==== Tripuri literature ====
Tripuri(Kokborok/Tiprakok) is the native language of Tripuri people in present Tripura state in North East of India.

==== Tulu literature ====
The written literature of Tulu is not as large as the literature of other literary Dravidian languages such as Tamil.

== In foreign languages ==
=== Indian Persian literature ===
During the early Muslim period, Persian became the official language of the northern part of Indian subcontinent, used by most of the educated and the government. The language had, from its earliest days in the 11th century CE, been imported to the subcontinent by various culturally Persianised Central Asian Turkic and Afghan dynasties.

== In different communities ==
=== Literature from North East India ===
Literature from North East India included Assamese literature, Meitei or Manipuri literature, Naga literature, among others. Ancient India has many intensive examples, like that of the incredible verses translated from the Ramayana, named Saptakanda Ramayana. Choral songs known as Oja-Pali, and theater performances, known as Panchali, were also an extensive part of Assamese literature.

=== Dalit literature ===
Dalit literature includes works written by Dalits that explain their experiences and advocate for justice and equality. It expanded during the Dalit movement. The movement's activism and new artistic works advocate for caste equality and protest caste-based oppression and violence.

=== LGBTQ literature ===
Indian LGBTQ literature, or queer literature, spans mythological and ancient tales, works like "Lihaaf" published during periods of societal stigma, and recent writing as publishing becomes more accessible to the genre. These works may be about the LGBTQ community, or be written by LGBTQ writers, or address themes relevant to LGBTQ people.

=== Prison literature ===
Prison literature in India involves writing by authors who have been incarcerated, and sometimes works written while they are incarcerated. The genre is predominantly made up of memoirs, autobiographies, and personal artifacts like letters and diaries. Often, these works provide political messaging that counters dominant narratives promoted by institutions of power. These works also can provide testimony about how incarcerated people are treated.

== Awards ==
In contemporary Indian literature, there are two major literary awards; these are the Sahitya Akademi Fellowship and the Jnanpith Award. Eight Jnanpith Awards each have been awarded in Hindi and Kannada, followed by five in Bengali and Malayalam, four in Odia, Gujarati, Marathi, Telugu and Urdu, two each in Assamese, Konkani and Tamil, and one each in Sanskrit and Kashmiri۔

- Sahitya Akademi Fellowship
- Jnanpith Award
- Sahitya Akademi Award
- Vyas Samman
- Saraswati Samman

== See also ==
- Indian epic poetry
- Indian Literature (journal)
- Indian poetry
- List of ancient Indian writers
- Literature from North East India
- Stephanian school of literature
- List of countries and territories where Hindustani is an official language
- Kavishala
