= Benjamin Daimary =

Indian actor (born 2000)

Benjamin Doimary
- Born: 28 July 2000 (age 26); Goreswar, Baksa, Assam, India
- Occupation: Actor
- Years active: 2019–present

Benjamin Daimary (born 28 July 2000) is the first openly gay Indian actor to win a national film award. He got the Jury's special award for his role in the Assamese film Jonaki Porua (Fireflies) in 2021. He also received the best actor award at the Asian Queer Film Festival in 2020.

Benjamin was born in Goreswar town of Baksa district, Assam. Parallel to acting, he is working as a make up artist in Assamese fashion industry.

== Early life ==
Benjamin Daimary was born in Goreswar in Assam.

== Personal life ==
He is openly gay and his family is supportive of him. He is currently residing in Mumbai and pursuing his acting career there.
