= Ngima Gelu Sherpa =

Nepalese film director

- ङिमा गेलु शेर्पा
- Born: February 16, 1993 (age 33)
- Occupation: Filmmaker
- Organization: Ama Dablam Pictures
- Website: https://amadablam.pictures/

Ngima Gelu Sherpa is a Nepali film director. He was born on February 16, 1993 in Solukhumbu, an eastern Himalayan district of Nepal. He is a writer, director and producer, known for Phulsiri and Home.
