= Ayoub Qanir =

Moroccan-American filmmaker

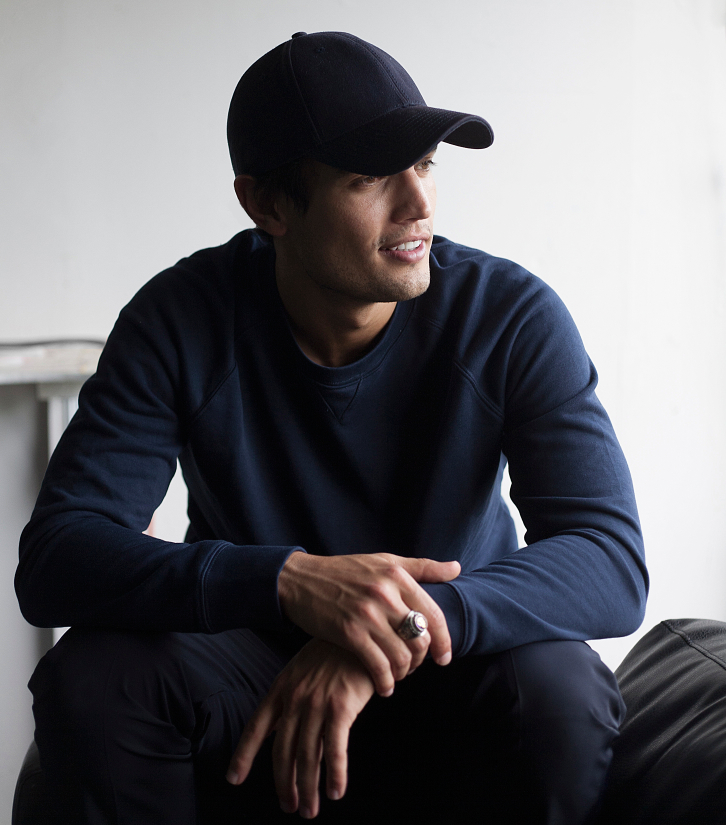
- Born: 1983 (age 42–43); Casablanca, Morocco
- Occupation: Filmmaker
- Years active: 2008-Present
- Awards: Knight of the Order of Ouissam Alaouite

Ayoub Qanir (born 1983) is an American filmmaker and writer, known for his films Artificio Conceal and The World of Which We Dream Doesn't Exist. He is also a graphic novelist. In 2015, he was knighted by the King of Morocco.

== Early life and education ==
Qanir was born in 1983 in Casablanca, Morocco. He grew up in Madrid, Spain where as a kid he would shoot short films with his friends in his parents' backyard using a Handycam. He later moved to the United States where he graduated from the University of Miami with a double major in management and finance. He also studied nanotechnology at Harvard and film direction at the Lee Strasberg Theatre and Film Institute.

== Career ==
Qanir began his career directing and producing music videos and short documentaries. In 2009, he began writing fiction by releasing a series of comic books in collaboration with Juan Doe. Some of Qanir's earlier work includes films such as Human After All and Koyakatsi.

His first film to gain traction was Artificio Conceal, a 2014 film with David Bailie. He presented it at the Festival International de Films de Montréal where he also moderated a discussion on imagination as a means of survival. It played at over 50 film festivals, including being shortlisted at the 2015 Cannes Film Festival, and won numerous awards including "Best Short Film" at the 2015 Bengaluru International Short Film Festival. In November 2015, Qanir became a Knight of the Order of Ouissam Alaouite awarded by the King of Morocco.

Qanir wrote, directed, and produced the 2017 film The World of Which We Dream Doesn't Exist which was shown at the 22nd International Film Festival of Kerala. It won numerous awards including "Best Production Design" at the Ischia Film Festival and "Best Experimental Film" at the American Filmatic Arts Awards. The following year he released the feature film Sea of Light which was filmed in the Westfjords in Iceland. In 2020, Qanir released Darkness of Otherwhere, a film he shot in Japan. It won the "Best Experimental Film Award" at the 2020 Arthouse Film Festival.

== Filmography ==
Year	Title	Director	Writer	Producer	Ref.
2012	Human After All	Yes	No	No	
2012	Moonwalker	Yes	No	No	
2012	Room 237	Yes	Yes	Yes	
2014	Koyakatsi	Yes	Yes	No	
2014	Artificio Conceal	Yes	Yes	Yes	
2017	The World of Which We Dream Doesn't Exist	Yes	Yes	Yes	
2018	Sea of Light	Yes	Yes	Yes	
2020	Darkness of Otherwhere	Yes	Yes	Yes	
2024	Daria	Yes	Yes	No	
2025	Where God Lives	Yes	Yes	Yes	

== Graphic novels ==
- 2014, Artificio Conceal
- 2015, The Green March
- 2017, The First Moroccan in Space
- 2024, Lions of the Atlas
