= Savita Singh =

Indian cinematographer and film director

- Born: Hisar, Haryana
- Occupations: Cinematographer; film director

Savita Singh is an Indian cinematographer and film director. She gained recognition for her work as the cinematographer of the short film Sonsi, which won the National Film Award for Best Cinematography and was selected as India's entry for the Oscars in the short film category.

== Early life ==
Savita Singh was born and raised in Hisar, Haryana, in a family of farmers. She was the first female graduate from her village, and her passion for visual storytelling led her to pursue a career in cinema. With the support of her father, who worked in a bank, Savita pursued her passion for filmmaking after a stint as a journalist in Delhi. She went on to study at the Film and Television Institute of India, where she collaborated with Amit Dutta, a senior, on the experimental film Kramasha. This collaboration proved to be a turning point in her career, as the film received widespread acclaim and earned her a National Film Award.

== Career ==
After completing her studies, Savita moved to Mumbai and began her career as a cinematographer. She worked on notable projects such as Phoonk directed by Ram Gopal Varma and 404 directed by Prawaal Raman. In 2019, Savita Singh made her directorial debut with the short film Sonsi. The film, which she also wrote, delves into a mystical and poetic narrative, following the journey of an eight-year-old girl named Nadi as she ventures into a deep and mysterious woods in search of her dream-etched shadow bird. The film won the National Film Award for Best Cinematography and was chosen as India's entry for the Oscars in the short film category.

== Recognition and awards ==
Awards and recognition
Year	Award	Category	Work	Result	Ref.
2019	67th National Film Awards	Best Cinematography	Sonsi	Won	
2019	Lady Filmmakers Festival	Best Film	Sonsi	Won	
2019	Bengaluru International Short Film Festival	Best Film	Sonsi	Won	
2019	Oscars	Short film	Sonsi	Nominated	
2007	55th National Film Awards	Best Cinematography	Kramasha	Won	
