= The Assam Valley School =

Location
- Balipara, Tezpur; Assam - 784101; India; 26°46′57″N 92°44′47″E

Information
- Type: Co-ed boarding school
- Motto: Truth is strength
- Religious affiliation: Secular
- Established: 1995
- Founder: B.M. Khaitan
- School board: ICSE/ISC
- Headmaster: Dr Amit Jugran
- Gender: Mixed
- Age range: 9-18
- Enrollment: 890
- Language: English
- Campus size: 235 acres
- Publication: Assam Valley Express
- Affiliation: CISCE
- Website: www.assamvalleyschool.com

The Assam Valley School (informally Assam Valley School or AVS) is a co-educational private boarding school in Assam, India, which was founded in 1995 by the Williamson Magor Education Trust. The school, spread across 270 acres, houses 890 students and is fully residential. It is a Round Square and Indian Public Schools' Conference member.

== Notable alumni ==
- Janice Pariat, Novelist
- Patralekha Paul, Actor
- Rukshana Tabassum, Filmmaker
