= Kastoori =

- Directed by: Vinod Uttreshwar Kamble
- Release date: 2019
- Country: India
- Language: Hindi

Kastoori is a 2019 Indian Hindi language film directed by Vinod Uttreshwar Kamble. The film won Best Children's film national award in the 67th National Film Awards 2019.
