= Phulsiri =

- Official Poster
- Directed by: Ngima Gelu Lama
- Screenplay by: Ngima Gelu Lama
- Produced by: Ngima Gelu Lama; Tenjee Lama; Furba Lama; Sange Sherpa
- Starring: Bimala Gurung; Bhim Bahadur Gurung; Ram Sharan Upreti
- Cinematography: Ali Rasheed rajwal Bhattarai
- Edited by: Ngima Gelu Lama
- Music by: Sangam Panta; Pushpa Palanchoke
- Production company: Ama Dablam Pictures
- Distributed by: Ama Dablam Pictures
- Release date: 2016
- Country: Nepal
- Languages: Gurung; Nepali

Phulsiri is a 2016 Gurung language Nepali fiction film written, produced and directed by Ngima Gelu Lama. The film tells a deceptively simple account of tramautized schoolgirl's quest to her shoes, since, her school is reopening one and half months after the devastating Gorkha earthquake. The film is the first fiction film to be filmed in Gorkha, the epicentre of Nepal earthquake 2015 after the earthquake. The film won Best Children Film in Nepal Culture international Film Festival.

== Logline ==
One and a half months after the devastating earthquake reduced an entire village to rubble, and a ten-year-old girl longs for normality. News reaches her that school will re-open in a day and she is understandably overjoyed, but there is a hitch: she must first locate her shoes --- mandatory under new school rules --- in the debris that was once her home.

== Synopsis ==
In the Gurung village of Ghyachchok, almost all the houses have collapsed. Inside the crumbling walls of a roofless house, a hangman's knot hangs from a beam.

Ram Sir, the village school teacher, has just arrived after several weeks in his own village in Sindupalanchok, leaving his wife and daughter in a makeshift shelter made of zinc sheet.

The government has announced that all educational institutions must re-open, but Ram is worried about the monsoon and the increased threat of landslides in his own village. Moreover, mobile network is poor in Ghyachchowk and the lack of news about his family adds to the teacher's woes.

Ten-year-old Phulsiri is attending the funeral of a Gurkha soldier, who served in the Indian army and appears to have taken his own life after he lost all the members of his family to the earthquake. Along the way, Phulsiri meets her classmate Prabal and learns from him that school is re-opening the very next day. Phulsiri and her father Amber, who broke his leg in an aftershock, have been living in temporary shelter after the earthquake destroyed their home.

But the school has strict rules about the school uniform, including shoes, and hers are still buried under the rubble of her home. Phulsiri remembers her teacher Ram, only a day before the earthquake, expressly warning her not to show up without shoes.

Phulsiri already has her school shirt and frock, and she is impatient to look for her shoes. But her continuous pleading to her father to allow her to leave the funeral is in vain. Moreover, he tells her that even if her shoes survived the earthquake, they would not have survived the subsequent rains.

Even the conclusion of the funeral doesn't mean freedom for Phulsiri to look for her shoes in peace. New obstacles materialize and the process of overcoming them is slow and painful.

Phulsiri learns that the hard way that surviving an earthquake isn't enough as the film painstakingly chronicles her struggles and her coping strategies in the wake of the worst natural disaster in the living memory of her community.
