= Saravanamaruthu Soundarapandi =

Indian cinematographer

- Died: 2023 (aged 32)
- Occupation: Cinematographer
- Parent: Muthulakshmi S (mother)

Saravanamaruthu Soundarapandi was an Indian cinematographer who worked predominantly in Malayalam, Marathi, Hindi, Bengali, and Tamil films. He was posthumously awarded the National Film Award for Best Cinematography (Non-Feature Film) in 2023 for Little Wings, along with Meenakshi Soman.

Little Wings was selected for the Indian Panorama section of the International Film Festival of India. It was also chosen for several established and notable documentary and short film festivals, such as the International Film Festival of South Asia (IFFSA), Toronto 2022, and the Regina International Film Festival and Awards 2022 edition. It won the award for Best Short Film at the International Documentary and Short Film Festival of Kerala (IDSFFK).

Previously, Saravanamaruthu served as the cinematographer for Salana Jalsa (2019), which was selected for the Golden Goblet competition at the 23rd Shanghai International Film Festival, an A-tier film festival.

== Early life ==
Saravanamaruthu earned a postgraduate diploma in cinematography from the Satyajit Ray Film and Television Institute (SRFTI), Kolkata. Before pursuing the diploma, he worked as an iOS developer for nearly two years at a leading Indian IT company.

== Death ==
Saravanamaruthu was murdered in 2023 at the age of 32. He had left from his house in Madurai on March 15 and never returned. A fortnight later, police found his body buried in an area called Keeranur.

== Filmography ==
As assistant cinematographer

- Bunty Aur Babli 2 (2021)
- Bachcchan Paandey (2022)
- 1800 Life (2022)

As cinematographer

- Salana Jalsa - National Day (2019)
- Little Wings (2022)
