= Ghyachchok =

Coordinates: 28°12′05″N 84°42′21″E

Ghyachchok is a Gurung Village of Gorkha District, western region of Nepal. The estimated terrain elevation above sea level is 1630 metres. The whole village was turned into rubble by the Nepal earthquake of 2015. The earthquake had the nearby Daraudi River the epicentre.
