= Kramasha =

2007 short documentary film by Amit Dutta

- Directed by: Amit Dutta
- Produced by: Film and Television Institute of India
- Starring: Documentary
- Cinematography: Savita Singh
- Release date: 2007
- Running time: 22 minutes
- Country: India

Kramasha (To Be Continued, 2007) is a short experimental film directed by Amit Dutta. Released in 2007, the film won two National Film Awards in 2007 and received recognition at various international film festivals.

== Synopsis ==
Kramasha takes place in a small Indian village during the early morning hours. The film begins with a scene of a sleeping family inside their house, with the young boy dozing off next to the window. In a state of sleep and wakefulness, the boy experiences a journey that blurs the boundaries between reality and fantasy.

== Reception ==
Upon its release, Kramasha garnered positive reviews from both critics and audiences. At the Oberhausen Film Festival in 2007, the film was hailed as a "defining moment in world cinema". A film critic named Jonathan Rosenbaum described Kramasha as "a dazzling virtuos piece of mise en scene in 35 millimetre, full of uncanny imagery about the way the narrator imagines the past of his village and his family."

== Awards and recognition ==
Kramasha received several awards and recognition for its artistic and technical achievements. In 2007, it won two National Film Awards, including Best Cinematography and Best Audiography. At the Bilbao International Festival of Documentary and Short Films, the film was awarded Best Short Film (Golden Mikeldi). The film was also included in Jonathan Rosenbaum's list of 1,000 best films of all time.

== See also ==
- Documentary film
- Experimental film
- Short film
