= Prashant Naik =

Indian cricketer (born 1986)

Personal information
- Full name: Prashant Tukuram Naik
- Born: 2 September 1986 (age 40); Pune, Maharashtra, India
- Batting: Right-handed
- Bowling: Leg break googly
- Role: Batsman

Domestic team information
- Years: Team
- 2006/07–2011/12: Mumbai
- FC debut: 8 September 2007 Mumbai v Karachi Urban
- Last FC: 3 November 2011 Mumbai v Railways
- LA debut: 12 February 2007 Mumbai v Gujarat
- Last LA: 4 March 2009 Mumbai v Tamil Nadu

Career statistics
Competition	FC	LA	T20
Matches	14	7	5
Runs scored	617	141	82
Batting average	36.29	35.25	20.50
100s/50s	1/4	0/1	0/0
Top score	118	58	48*
Balls bowled	72	–	–
Wickets	0	–	–
Bowling average	–	–	–
5 wickets in innings	–	–	–
10 wickets in match	–	–	–
Best bowling	–	–	–
Catches/stumpings	6/0	0/0	1/0
- Source: ESPNcricinfo, 7 July 2013

Prashant Tukuram Naik (born 2 September 1986) is an Indian former cricketer who played for Mumbai. He was born in Pune, Maharashtra. He was brought by Delhi Daredevils for the 2011 and the 2012 Indian Premier League. Prashant was selected for India Under 19 in the year 2005.

He started playing cricket in Pune under coach Anna Nevrekar From SSPMS day school. He Shifted to Mumbai in the 9th grade to further develop his cricket.
