= Stephanian school of literature =

Stephanian school of literature is a body of fictional works written in English, mostly novels written by the alumni of St. Stephen's College, Delhi.

It may be called a subgenre of Indian English literature, but the validity of this is heavily debated by various critics. Brinda Bose's "Of Voids and Speculums; Or Where Is the Woman in the Text" is an essay that forcefully denies the existence of such a school of writing.

Many other authors and scholars have discussed this in detail in various essays. Some authors defend the spirit of Stephania and state it does not matter whether or not there is such a school of literature, while others tend to celebrate the college.

Amitav Ghosh, Rukun Advani, Mukul Kesavan and Shashi Tharoor are some famous Indian English writers who belong to the Stephanian School of Literature.

In an interview Amitav Ghosh comments on this topic:

The ethos of St. Stephen's were not at all artistic. Everyone had the IAS exams in their mind. But in a way many writers like Shashi Tharoor and Upamanyu Chatterjee came through that bureaucratic set-up. When I look back I find there is nothing really surprising about it. Because Stephen's had a lot of talented people who were also self-confident. Whenever there is some form of artistic outburst, there are links of this kind. Spanish filmmaker Luis Buñuel studied at San Fernando Academy of Fine Arts in Madrid with poet Federico Garcia Lorca and surrealist painter Salvador Dalí. I think these connections do exist in the world of art and literature.

== See also ==
- Indian literature
- Literature from North East India
