= Indian prison literature =

Indian literature genre

Indian prison literature is the prison literature mainly written by Indians who were incarcerated in the Indian subcontinent. It provides a unique entry-point into the nature of punishments, and crime, and holds a mirror to the conditions of prisoners, reflecting on the intricacies of the functioning of jails and prison houses, features of law and legal systems in a particular time and place. Indian prison writing often traces the creative growth of the individuals, their personal moments of immense vulnerability, and sometimes even records their political views and ideas. In the subcontinent's literary history, this genre shows a diversity of form and content; it interrogates, in particular, the power structures of the given time period, and shows the human side of the prison experience. The narratives reveal the intersection between the personal and the political, and it is perhaps because of its inherent subversive potential, that the genre has regularly suffered from a distinct neglect of scholarship, and brutal censorship.

Prison narratives provided the prisoners a way of relating their trauma of confinement, enabling them to come to terms with the punishment, and consequent social ostracisation that they had to endure. The diverse prison writings from various epochs and regions of the subcontinent acts as an archive that provides an active commentary on legal systems, power relations, and the nature of authority that regulate such structures. They showcase how power relations have changed in the nation – from monarchy to a democratic republic through a phase of colonialism, and how with this change the legal systems, the understanding of crime and punishments have also undergone significant changes from the ancient to the modern era. Moreover, whilst looking at this genre from a gendered perspective, there is a distinct lacuna in the voices and records left by women prisoners, which discuss the nature of the female subject's relationships with power, crime and punishment in a society.

== Ancient period ==
The earliest instance of prison literature in India can be traced back to the Sangam period. Puranānūru is a collection of poems about war and politics that was written in the praise of ancient kings who ruled over the Tamilakam. The 74th poem from this collection was composed by King Chēramān Kanaikkāl Irumporai who recounts his experience after he was defeated and imprisoned by King Chōlan Chenkanān at Kazhumalam. The poem reads:

I'm sitting here suffering like a dog in chains, not cut up like a hero, without any mental strength, and having to plead for water to enemies without generosity.

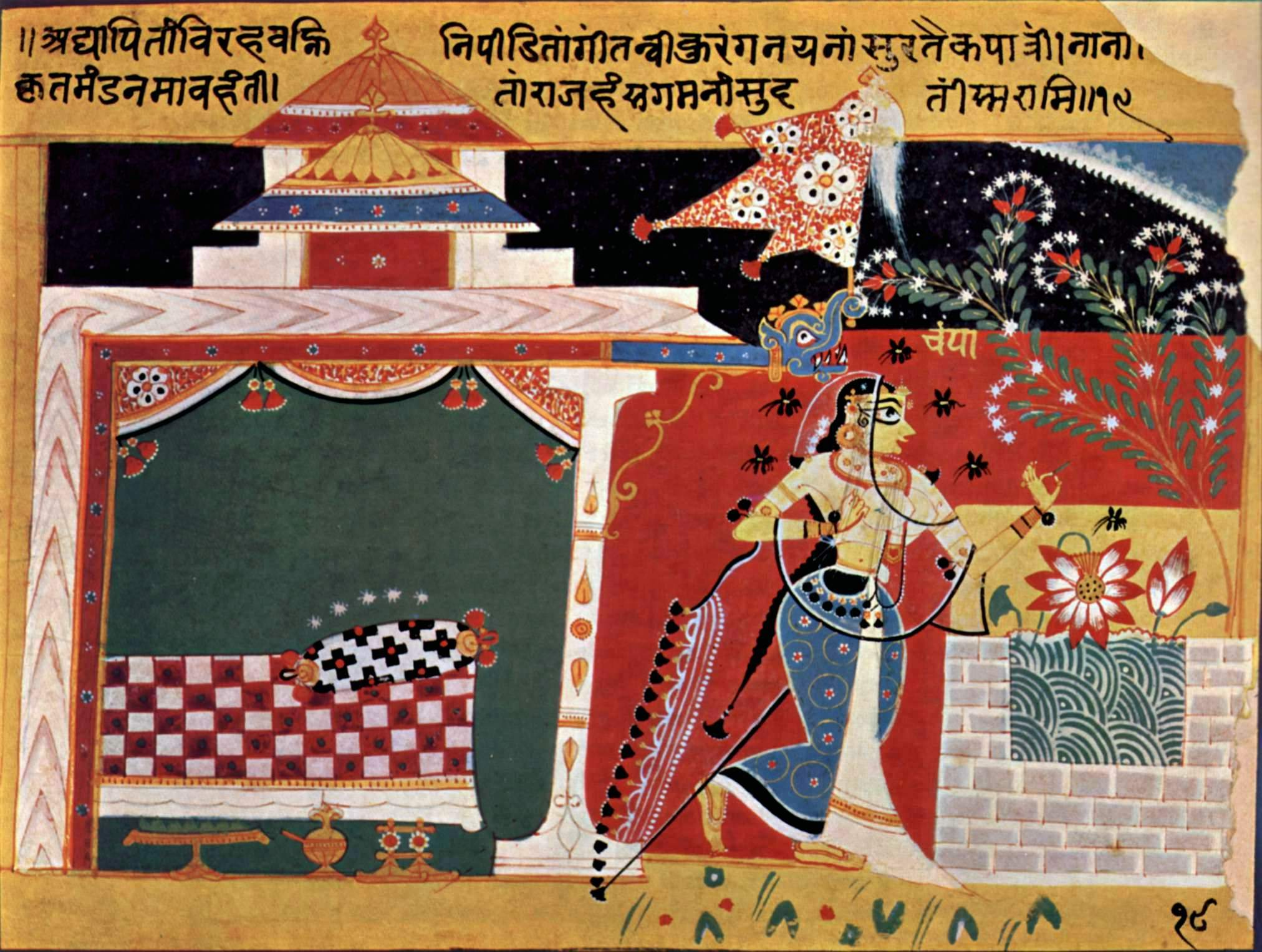
Chaurapañchâsikâ-Manuscripts

While in the domain of Sanskrit literature, a love poem by the Kashmiri poet Bilhana, entitled Chaura Panchashika has been cited as the earliest form of prison writing. Composed by Bilhana during the days of his imprisonment, he sung these verses as he was hanged to death. Bilhana was punished by King Madanabhirama for having a secret tryst with her daughter Princess Yaminipurnatilaka. The poem traces his tale of anguish.

== Medieval period ==
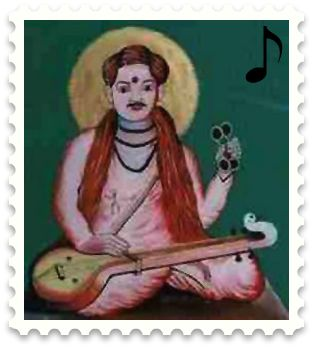
Bhadrachala Ramadas

During the medieval phase of Indian history, there are two sets of narratives about prison houses and life inside them, namely, the bandikhana bhajanagalu and travel accounts left by Fray Sebastian Manrique. The former is a set of prison bhajans composed by Bhadrachala Ramadas, who was arrested by the angry Sultan of Golconda for attempting to consecrate a temple for Lord Ram at Bhadrachalam, whereas the latter narrates how Manrique, a Portuguese missionary and traveller, who was suspected of piracy, was jailed in Midnapore.

The ancient and the medieval phases of prison literature in India, suggests a degree of mythical antiquity as suggested by C. D. Narasimhaiah. Mostly written in the form of verse, works like that of Ramdas describe the inner experiences and turmoil of the prisoners, the harsh conditions they had to endure, the brutal nature of punishments, and the supremacy of the sovereign who delivered that punishment, and held them captive. On the other hand, Manrique's account gives a fair idea of the prison system – how there were loopholes which he exploited and managed to live a lavish life inside the prison cell. Other accounts incline towards the spiritual and lack the objective glance that Manrique's travelogue provides.

== Colonial period ==
The following colonial phase was marked by an increased "preference for improved veracity", and there was also a shift in terms of the form. While earlier narratives were usually in the style of poetic compositions, there was now a proliferation of the prose-style with narratives being produced in the forms of diaries and journals. This was the result of the interaction with western ideas. The preference of veracity furthermore resulted in the fictitious element, present in earlier narratives, becoming less pronounced in this age.

In the initial years, most narratives were composed by westerners who had been imprisoned by the native monarchs, and follow a similar tone as that of Manrique. Examples include – Henry Oakes's An Authentic Narrative of the Treatment of the English, Who Were Taken Prisoners on the Reduction of Bednore, by Tippoo Saib (1785), James Scurry's The Captivity, Sufferings, and Escape of James Scurry (1824), etc. Several such writings have been compiled by Pramod K. Nayar in the English Siege and Prison Writings: From the 'Black Hole' to the 'Mutiny'. G. B. Chevigny's theorisation, on the other hand, that a "prisoner values nature because of its absence inside the space of confinement" could be found in Mayurasandesam written by the Malayalam poet and translator, Kerala Varma, popularly known as Kalidasa of Kerala. Mayurasandesam bears the distinct mark of influence of Kalidasa's Meghadūta, and uses the imagery of nature to portray the prisoner's desire to transcend the confined space.

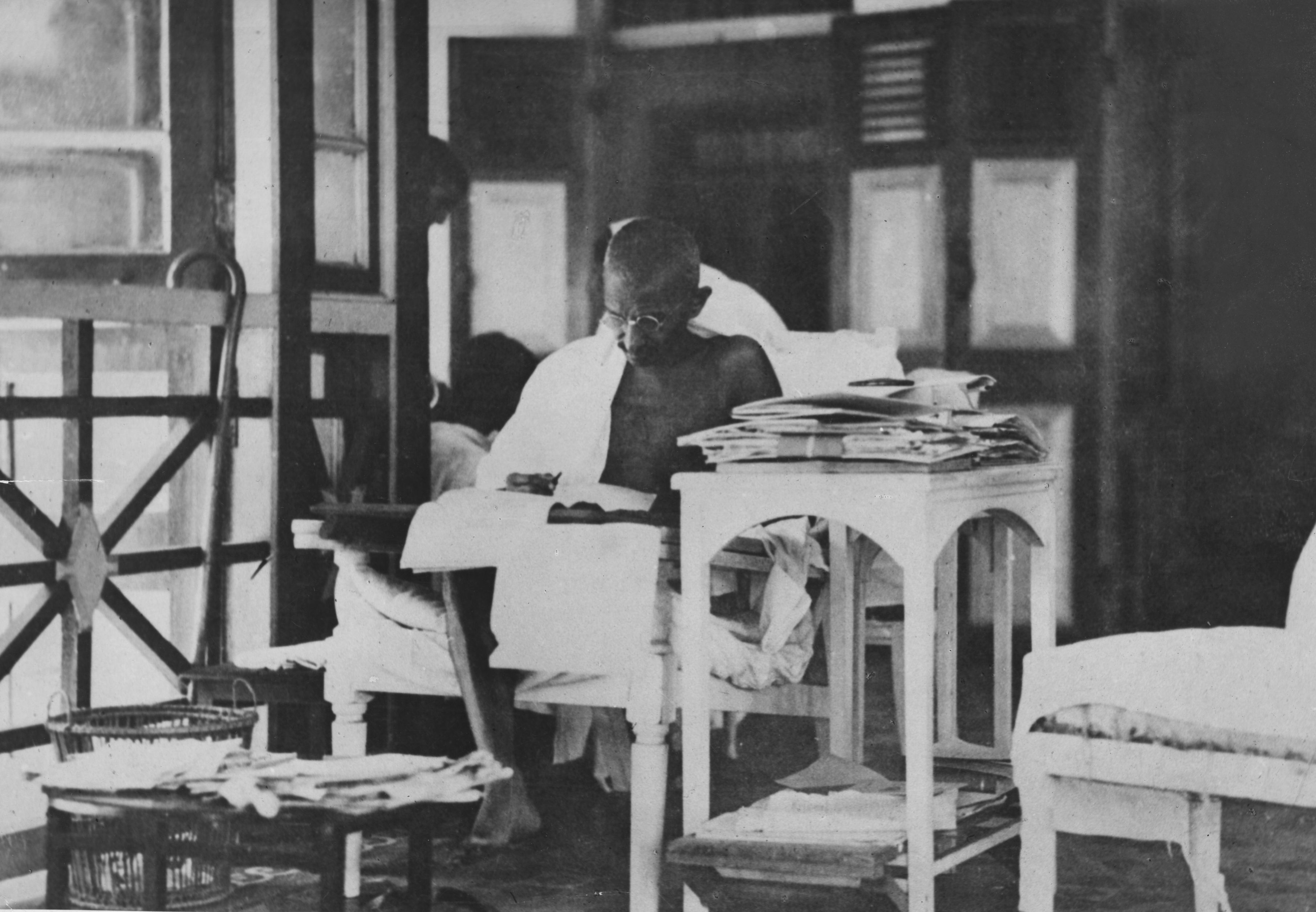
Gandhi reading his correspondence whilst living in seclusion after being released from prison.

In the years which followed, the incarceration of freedom fighters by the British Raj produced a diverse range of prison narratives. The form varied from newspaper articles, jail diaries, autobiographies, etc. While diaries were not meant for publication, articles and pamphlets were often political and meant for public circulation. Nehru's An Autobiography, Gandhi's The Story of My Experiments with Truth, Aurobindo Ghose's Tales from Prison Life, etc., are certain examples of the autobiographical form of prison literature that gained prominence during this period, and recounted the carceral experiences of the freedom fighters and nationalists under the ruthless colonial rule.

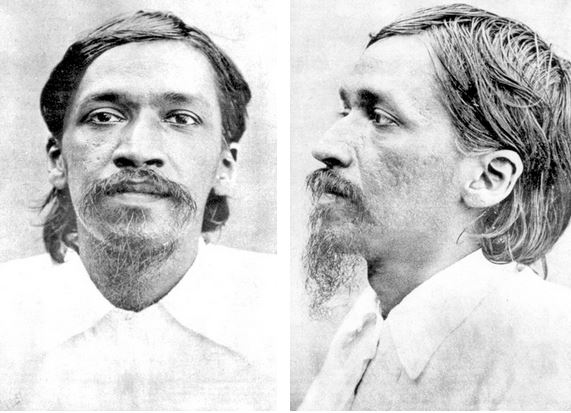
Police photograph of Aurobindo taken while he was a prisoner in Alipore Jail in India.

This phase also saw prison poetry, including those written by the Ghadarites such as Sant Visakha Singh, who participated in the 1913-20 Ghadar movement. The poems had an intertextuality with Guru Gobind Singh's lyrics, and the movement inspired Bhagat Singh who also wrote his Jail Diary in 1929. In the oeuvre of Hindi prison literature, the contribution of S. H. Vatsyayan (Agyeya), who was imprisoned for assisting Bhagat Singh, is particularly noted. Whereas writings in the vernacular/regional languages such as Upendranath Bandyopadhyay's Nirbaster Atmakatha reached the regional public.

The prison literature of this period communicates the anguish of the political prisoners, records their resistance against the colonial administration, and bears testimonies to the inhuman atrocities that colonial rule inflicted upon the people. Several ideas that shall afterwards create the fabric of the nation find their genesis in the prison writings of this time. In many narratives one finds the "Gandhian idea of prison as swarajashrama" where prison, instead of being viewed as a horrible space of confinement and punishment, was seen as a holy site providing opportunities for introspection, satyagraha and from where larger masses of people could be inspired to move into action against the British oppression.

== Modern period ==
The modern phase of prison writing begins roughly from the emergence of communism, trade unionism in the 1950s, progressing through the 1975-77 Emergency years, followed by the rise of Naxalism and Maoism in 1970s, to the present day when again the state apparatus, post-2014, has turned excessively Leviathan and has begun clamping down upon its citizens. Faiz's collection Dast-e-Saba and Zindan, Mahadev Desai's Day to Day with Gandhi (1953), Jayaprakash Narayan's Prison Diary (1977) to Umar Khalid's For In Your Tongue, I Cannot Fit: Encounters With Prison (2022) are some prominent examples.

These modern pieces of writing are stretched across a diversity of genres including memoir, testimony, diary, journal and collaborative narratives. Narrators often include multimodal elements such as photographs, letters, caricatures and legal texts to establish the veracity and autobiographical footing of their works, as seen in Arun Ferreira's Colours of the Cage: A Prison Memoir (2014).
