= Rukshana Tabassum =

Indian filmmaker

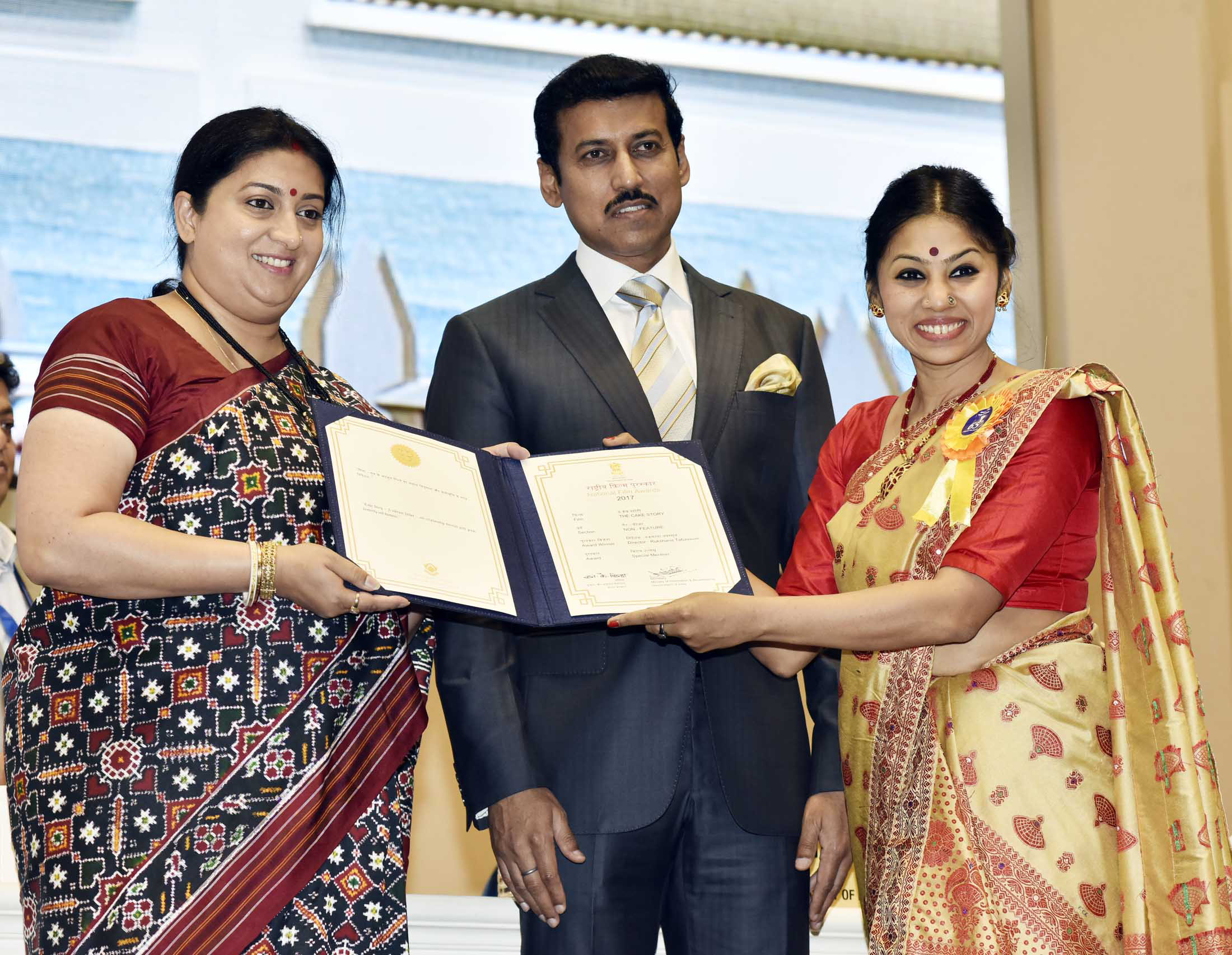
- Born: 13 May 1985 (age 40)
- Education: Film and Television Institute of India, The Assam Valley School

Rukshana Tabassum (born 13 May 1985) is a filmmaker, actress and producer from India predominantly working on Hindi films. She is an alumnus of the Film and Television Institute of India and has won National Film Award (Jury’s Special Mention) in the short fiction non–feature category in 2018 for her film ‘The Cake Story’ produced by Children’s Film Society of India (CFSI) and another National Film Award (Best Educational Film) for her film Apples and Oranges produced by LXL Ideas.

She was also one of the Nominated Member of the IDPA Jury Panel 2015-16 and an alumna of International Visitor's Leadership Programme. Other than feature films, also directs advertisements, and has made advertisements for several organisations including Reliance, Godrej, Kent RO Systems, Odisha Tourism, Asian Paints and Nestle.

She is also a classical dancer and has completed Advanced Diploma in Bharatnatyam ‘Parangata’ from Nalanda Nritya Kala Mahavidyalaya, Mumbai. She is also a visiting faculty at State University of Performing Arts and Visual Arts Rohtak and FTII Pune.

== Early childhood and education ==
Rukshana Tabassum spent most of her childhood in Nagaon Assam and did her schooling at The Assam Valley School, Balipara. Later she completed her Bachelors in Arts from Delhi University. Before starting out a career in advertising, she completed her post graduate diploma in Advertising and Marketing Communications from Wigan & Leigh College and later a post graduate course in film direction from Film and Television Institute of India, Pune. While studying at FTII, she secured both Best Director and Best Student award.

== Filmography ==
Year	Title	Awards	
	Burning		
2020	Dammy	Indian Film Festival (Stuttgart)	Sarvamangala Arts Initiative
2018	The Cake Story	Jury’s Special Mention, National Film Award 2018 Smile International Film Festival for Children and Youth, 2018	Children’s Film Society of India
2019	Apples and Oranges	Best Educational Film at National Film Award 2020	LXL Ideas
	Mission Sunday		LXL Ideas
	I DO NOT FIT		
	Bubbles and Stars		
2019	Vaishnava - Being Humane (Sattriya Dance Film)		
2021	The Social Solution		
2020	Sanatione - Note To Self		
	REDBOXX		
