= Bengaluru International Short Film Festival =

Indian film festival

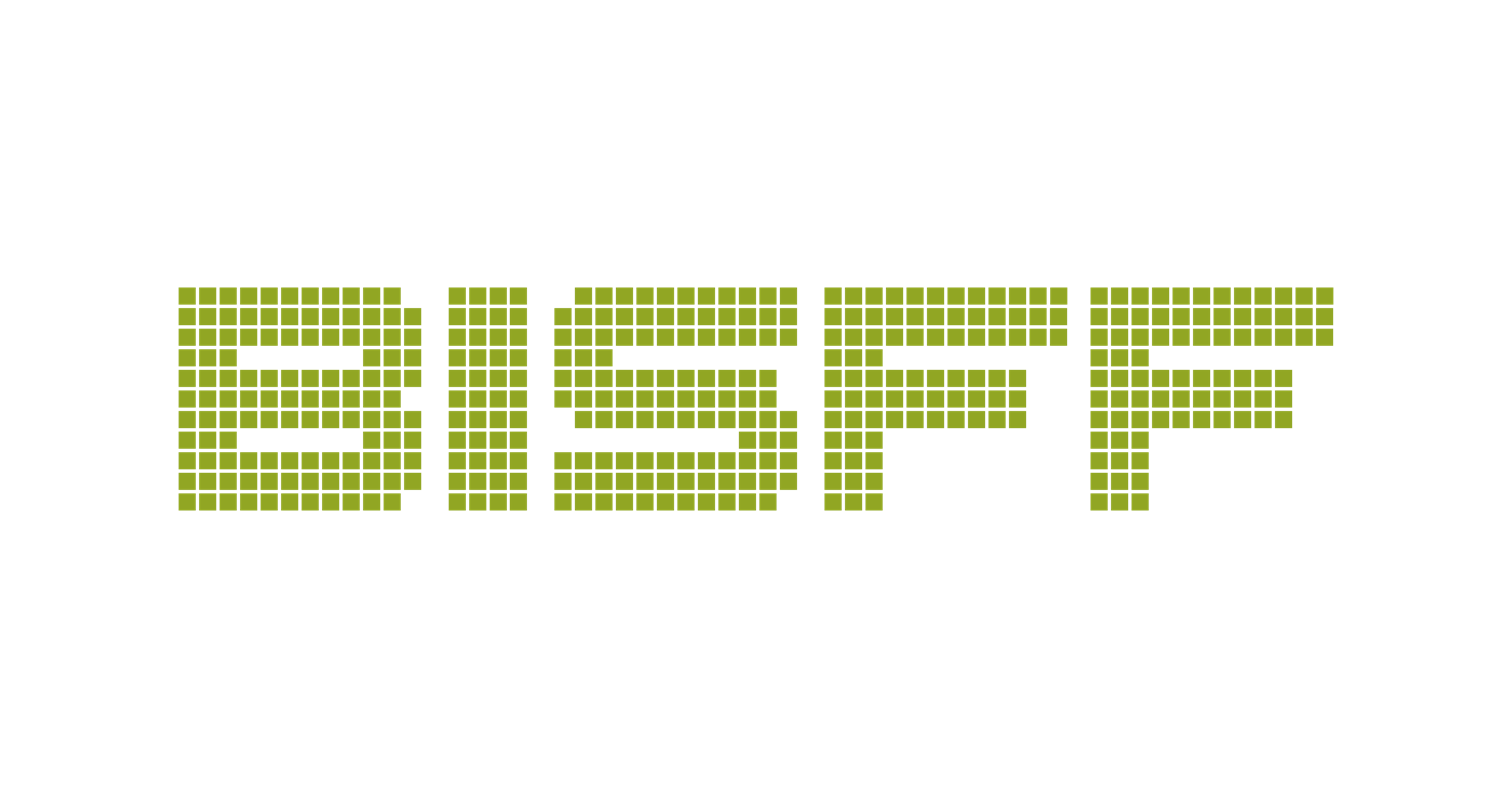
- Location: Bengaluru, Karnataka India
- Language: Multiple
- Website: http://bisff.in/

Bengaluru International Short Film Festival (BISFF) is an annual Oscar-qualifying film festivalheld in Bengaluru, India. Held first in 2010, it previews and showcases selected short films, in categories such as International, Indian, Karnataka, Animation, and non-competition category. These films are of less than 50 minutes in duration.

== Event history ==
=== BISFF 2014 ===
The 2014 edition of BISFF was held in the month of August. It received more than 500 short film submissions from 55 countries. The movie Seuls by Sami Kali was adjudged as the Best Short film, while I Am Sami by Kae Bahar was also awarded.

=== BISFF 2015 ===
Nooru Rupayi, a Kannada short film, won an award at BISFF 2015 and was also screened at the Washington DC South Asian Film Festival. Goodbye, Mayfly, a short fiction film set around the 2010 summer agitation in Jammu and Kashmir, won the Best Indian Film Award at BISFF 2015. The event saw the presence of Prakash Raj and Sriram Raghavan as chief guests. During the year, BISFF also partnered with Fliqvine, a social video-on-demand provider, to facilitate online screening of 26 selected short films.

The Best Short Films at BISFF 2015 were Artificio Conceal by Ayoub Qanir, Autonomous by Malla Grapengiesser, and Drops of Smoke by Ane Siderman.

=== BISFF 2016 ===
BISFF 2016 received over 2,670 short film submissions from 81 countries. Chalo Na Wali, a short Hindi film directed by Amol Bidkar, won the Best Screenplay Award at BISFF 2016 held in June. Kshitij Sharma won the Best Director Award for the short film Kaalchakra, while The Mandrake and the Sword by Christian Skibinski and Nesrin Bachir received a special festival mention. Best Friends Forever by Tyna Ezenma and Jusqu'aux Etoiles by Janine Piguet won the Best Short Film awards.

=== BISFF 2017 ===
In BISFF 2017, the Best Actor Award was won by Massud Rahnama for the short movie Halim. The movie, directed by Werner Fiedler, also won the Best Short Film Award. Tavleen Singh won the Best Music Award for 10 Rupay. The Best International Short Film Award was won by Nadine Asmar and Pascale Asmar for The Blind of the Cathedral.

=== BISFF 2018 ===
The 2018 version of the Bengaluru International Short Film Festival was held during August 16–19. The event saw screening of over 200 short films across the venues of Suchitra Film Society in Banashankari, Cobalt in Church Street and Goethe Institute in Indiranagar. The international submissions were judged by Carter Pilcher (founder of Britain's Shorts International), Jukka-Pekka Laakso (director of Tampere film festival in Finland) and TS Nagabharana. Indian short films were judged by Vijaya (journalist), Srinivasa Santhanam (chief programmer for Mumbai Film Festival) and Diego Faraone (Uruguayan film critic). Karnataka-based short films saw a jury composed of Abhaya Simha, Ananya Kasaravalli and Suman Nagarkar.

The Best Music Award was won by Ashim Kemson for the movie Good Night Sleep Tight. 9 to 6 by Sachin Kunder and Vinashi by Abhilash Shetty were nominated for the Best Short Films. Martien by Maxime Pillonel and Retouch by Kaveh Mazaheri were the Best International Short Films. The Nepalese short Phulsiri, was also screened as part of the BISFF official selection. The Kannada short film, Vighatane, made for BISFF 2018, was selected for screening at the Miami Independent Film Festival. The Kannada silent short film, Chrono, was a finalist at BISFF and the movie's director, Vivek Anand, won the Best Innovator Award at the Cinemuskoka Film Festival 2018 held in Ontario, Canada.

The short movie Neralu, starring Manasi Sudhir, also won an award at BISFF 2018. Paarivala, directed by Jerring Chandan, was a finalist at the festival and a semi-finalist at the Newark Short Film Festival 2018 held in the US. The short film, Pon Maalai Pozhudhu, was screened at the event and also made it to the International Short Film Festival Pune 2018. Shavepuri, starring Ashwin Rao Pallakki, was also screened at the event.

== BISFF 2019 ==
The 2019 edition of Bengaluru International Short Film Festival was held during August 15–19.
