= On the Job Training =

- Film poster
- Directed by: Geff Zamor
- Written by: Geff Zamor
- Produced by: Josh Lansky; Eliza Zamor
- Starring: Deance Wyatt; Ronnie Alvarez; Tracy Moore; Rey Lucas; Rod Rinks; Lewis Powell
- Cinematography: Nersi Elahi
- Release date: October 31, 2007 (FLIFF)
- Running time: 85 minutes
- Country: United States
- Language: English

On the Job Training is a 2007 independent feature film, written and directed by Geff Zamor. It premiered and won the audience award at the 2007 Fort Lauderdale International Film Festival and will be screening at the 2008 Hollywood Black Film Festival.

== Plot ==
It's June and Chauncey Nelson [Deance Wyatt] has just graduated from high school. Where most kids his age will spend their summer getting ready for college, Chauncey's got other plans: kick it with his boy Diego, win a youth boxing tournament and buy an Impala. Of course we all know what happens to even the best laid plans; Chauncey and Diego hang and get hung up in small-time hustles that go sour and the boxing tournament KOs any chance of Chauncey sporting golden gloves. Just as his dream car is about to ride off into the sunset, Chauncey gets it, there's a big difference between having a dream and working hard to make a dream come true.

== Cast ==
- Deance Wyatt as Chauncey
- Ronnie Alvarez as Diego
- Tracy Moore as Mario
- Lewis Powell as Tracy
- Rey Lucas as Oscar
- Rod Rinks as Sal
- Nicole Fitzgerald as Tiffany
- Laila Odom as Michelle.
- Ahnaise Christmas as Denise
- Jerry Milord as Eddie
- Kim Adams as marketing exec.
