= Oconomowoc (film) =

2013 American comedy film

- Directed by: Andy Gillies
- Written by: Andy Gillies
- Produced by: Andy Gillies; Joe Haas
- Starring: Andy Gillies
- Cinematography: Joe Haas
- Edited by: Joe Haas
- Music by: Andy Gillies; Joe Haas; Brendan Marshall-Rashid
- Production companies: What Productions; Joe Haas Media
- Release date: 2013
- Running time: 79 minutes
- Country: United States
- Language: English

Oconomowoc is a 2013 American comedy film written by, directed by, and starring Andy Gillies. The film follows a man who, after moving back in with his hard-drinking mother, becomes part of a T-shirt business with his friend.

== Reception ==
The film has received universally negative critical reception, currently holding a 12/100 rating (indicating "universal dislike") on Metacritic and an 11% approval rating on Rotten Tomatoes. The New York Times stated that the film "has one thing going for it: a running time of just 79 minutes, even if every one of them feels like an eternity." The Los Angeles Times called the film a "shaggy underachiever", while The Village Voice stated that "all conversation and action in the film take turns amounting to nothing." The film's sole semi-positive review came from Chuck Bowen of Slant Magazine, who posited that it "is extremely self-conscious, but in a fashion that generally serves the material" and is "an engagingly cynical ode to futility."
