= Naked Campus =

- DVD cover
- Directed by: Robert E. Morris
- Written by: Robert E. Morris; Peter Knight Silander
- Produced by: Patrick Peach
- Starring: Peter Knight Silander; Robert Dryer
- Cinematography: Steven Ross
- Edited by: Gregory Hobson
- Music by: Debora Deake-Mozee
- Release date: 1982
- Country: United States
- Language: English

Naked Campus is a 1982 drama film directed by Robert E. Morris and starring Peter Knight Silander and Robert Dryer.

It looks into the aspects and views of a small group of students, as they come across various life issues.

== Cast ==
- Peter Knight Silander as Mike
- Robert Dryer as John
- Robin Shepherd as Greg
- Julie Marine as Peggy
- Gail Thompson-Kindler as Laura
- Lee Arnone as Susan
- Don Conreaux as Mike's Father
- Ransom Roberts as Mike's Mother
- Bob Anderson as Greg's Father
- Joan Brenner as Greg's Mother
- Victor Swift as Vic Calhoun
- W.W. Cass as J. S. Fitch
- Ray Finks as Roomie
- Irene Firstein as Sunflower
- Jim Pettyjohn as Jim
