= Les Oreilles =

- Directed by: Gilbert Babena
- Screenplay by: Gilbert Babena
- Produced by: Acajou Films Canal+ Horizons
- Starring: Brian Ngoupé Sakio Toni Yolande Bath Atangana Tatiana Matip Gabriel Fomogne
- Cinematography: Joël Nzeuga
- Edited by: Théophile Ngwe II
- Music by: Ralain Ngammo Nounjio Landry Mbassi
- Release date: 2008
- Running time: 13 minutes 30 seconds
- Countries: Cameroon; France

Les Oreilles is a 2008 film.

== Synopsis ==
A boy by the name of Dieudonné (God Given) lives in a popular neighborhood in Yaoundé. His mother, a prostitute, does not love him. In view of this lack of affection, he decides to search for his father and observes every man he spots to see if he scratches his ear the way he himself does.

== Awards ==
- Festival Lumières d’Afrique de Besançon (Francia) 2009
