= The Obtrusive Wife =

1953 film

- Directed by: Serge Azaryan; Hassan Kheradmand
- Written by: Serge Azaryan
- Cinematography: Hassan Kheradmand; Boris Matayof; Vahak Vartanian
- Production company: Diana Film
- Release date: 20 March 1953
- Running time: 90 minutes
- Country: Iran
- Language: Persian

The Obtrusive Wife (Persian: Hamsare mozahem) is a 1953 Iranian comedy film directed by Serge Azaryan and Hassan Kheradmand and starring Sadegh Bahrami. The second production of Diana Film, It was released on March 20, 1953, at the Cinema Diana after six months of production. Like most films of the era, it was produced on 35 mm black and white film

== Bibliography ==
- Mohammad Ali Issari. Cinema in Iran, 1900-1979. Scarecrow Press, 1989.
