= Oni Ise Owo =

- Directed by: Kenneth Shofela Coker
- Produced by: Kenneth Shofela Coker
- Music by: Tinariwen
- Release date: 2007
- Running time: 3 minutes
- Country: Nigeria

Oni Ise Owo is a 2007 Nigerian film.

This animated short movie is a poetic adaptation by Kenneth Shofela Coker of an African myth: The seeking of identity in hard days.
