= List of Disney Channel (India) series =

This is a list of original programming by Disney Channel in India.

== Original shows ==
Year	Series	Production company	Premiere date	End date	Notes
2006	Vicky & Vetaal	Cinevistaas Limited	7 October 2006	17 March 2007	
2007	Dhoom Machaao Dhoom	SOL Productions	8 January 2007	10 January 2008	
2007	Agadam Bagdam Tigdam	Contiloe Entertainment	18 May 2007	9 November 2007	
2008	Break Time Masti Time	Contiloe Entertainment	6 October 2008	30 January 2009	Indian adaptation of Quelli dell'intervallo
2008	Nach to the Groove	SOL Productions	1 April 2008	December 2008	
2009	Kya Mast Hai Life	SOL Productions	27 April 2009	4 July 2010	Season 1 (27 April 2009 – 5 November 2009); Season 2 (17 April 2010 – 4 July 2010)
2010	Big Bada Boom	The Walt Disney Company India	5 April 2010	9 May 2011	
2010	Ishaan: Sapno Ko Awaaz De	Red Chillies Idiot Box	15 May 2010	27 March 2011	Season 1 (15 May 2010 – 13 November 2010); Season 2 (12 December 2010 – 27 March 2011)
2010	Art Attack with Gaurav Juyal	The Walt Disney Company India; HIT Entertainment	19 September 2010	8 June 2014	Indian adaptation of Art Attack; Season 1 (19 September 2010 – 13 April 2011); Season 2 (4 June 2011 – 26 November 2011); Season 3 (15 December 2013 – 8 June 2014)
2011	Best of Luck Nikki	The Company	3 April 2011	16 April 2016	Indian adaptation of Good Luck Charlie; Season 1 (3 April 2011 – 8 March 2012); Season 2 (3 June 2012 – 1 January 2013); Season 3 (7 July 2013 – 8 December 2013); Season 4 (2 August 2015 – 16 April 2016)
2011	Mai Ka Lal	SOL Productions; The Walt Disney Company India	12 June 2011	2 January 2012	
2012	The Suite Life of Karan & Kabir	The Company	8 April 2012	18 August 2013	Indian adaptation of The Suite Life of Zack & Cody; Season 1 (8 April 2012 – 1 July 2012); Season 2 (27 January 2013 – 18 August 2013)
2013	Disney Q Family Mastermind	BBC Worldwide	25 February 2013	13 June 2013	Indian version of Mastermind
2013	Shake It Up	SOL Productions	30 March 2013	2 November 2013	Indian adaptation of the American show of the same name
2013	Oye Jassie	Magic Works Entertainment	13 October 2013	2 February 2014	Indian adaptation of Jessie
2014	Captain Tiao	The Company	2 March 2014	9 October 2015	
2014	Arjun - Prince of Bali	Green Gold Animations	1 June 2014	11 September 2016	Animated series Spin-off series from 2013 film Chhota Bheem and the Throne of Bali; Season 1 (1 June 2014 – 22 November 2014); Season 2 (21 May 2015 – 11 November 2015); Season 3 (20 March 2016 – 11 September 2016)
2015	Zindagi Khatti Meethi	Film Farm Productions	31 January 2015	6 June 2015	
2015	Kabhi Aise Geet Gaya Karo	Cinevistaas Limited	31 January 2015	2 May 2015	
2015	Lage Raho Chachu	Contiloe Entertainment	31 January 2015	25 July 2015	
2015	Goldie Ahuja Matric Pass	The Company	1 February 2015	17 October 2015	
2015	Maan Na Maan Mein Tera Mehmaan	Optimystix Entertainment	1 February 2015	19 September 2015	
2015	Palak Pe Jhalak	Rose Audio Visuals	27 September 2015	9 December 2015	Indian adaptation of That's So Raven
2015	Vicky Aur Vetaal	Cinevistaas Limited	15 November 2015	3 April 2016	Reboot of 2006 series
2016	Gabbar Poonchwala	Lost Boy Productions	11 January 2016	4 April 2016	
2016	Gaju Bhai	Toonz Animation; The Walt Disney Company India	18 April 2016	11 May 2018	Animated series Season 1 (18 April 2016 – 10 October 2016); Season 2 (22 January 2018 – 11 May 2018)
2016	V 4 Viraat	Toonz Animation	24 May 2016	15 November 2016	Animated series
2016	Astra Force	Graphic India	27 November 2016	18 August 2017	Animated series
2017	Yom	Graphiti Multimedia	1 May 2017	11 August 2017	Animated series
2018	Simple Samosa	Ice Candy	14 May 2018	5 July 2018	Animated series, also aired on Disney Junior
2019	Oye Golu	Popcorn Animation Studios	5 May 2019	21 January 2020	Animated series Season 1 (5 May 2019 – 28 July 2019); Season 2 (16 December 2019 – 21 January 2020)
2019	Super V	Cornerstone Animation; Star India	5 November 2019	26 January 2020	Animated series, also aired on Star Plus, Star Sports, Hotstar and Marvel HQ
2020	Disney Imagine That	Disney Broadcasting (India) Limited	6 September 2020	present	Season 1 (6 September 2020 – 29 November 2020); Season 2 (18 April 2021 – present)

== Movies ==
Year	Film	Premiere date	Production company	Notes	References
2011	Feluda: The Kathmandu Caper	1 January 2011	DQ Entertainment International	First animated film based on Feluda	
2012	Luck Luck Ki Baat	30 September 2012	SOL Productions; The Walt Disney Company India	Remake of Disney Channel original movie The Luck of the Irish	
2016	Apna Bhai Gaju Bhai	3 July 2016	Toonz Animation; The Walt Disney Company India	Based on 2016 Disney Channel India original series Gaju Bhai; First Disney Channel India movie based on a TV series	

== Disney XD original series ==
- The Adventures of King Vikram (2012–2014)
- Chorr Police (2009–2012)
- Howzzattt (2012)
- Luv Kushh (2012–2014)
- Mysteries and Feluda (2011)
- P5 - Pandavas 5 (2011–2012)

== Hungama TV original series ==
- Hero – Bhakti Hi Shakti Hai (2005–2007) (Note: Disney property since 2006)
- Zoran (2007)

== Videos ==
- "All for One (Aaja Nachle)" from High School Musical 2
- "Ud Chale" from High School Musical 2
- "Ek Hai Hum (All for One)" from High School Musical 2
- "Shake it Up" (Medley of songs "Shake It Up", "Bezubaan" and "Sorry Sorry") from Shake It Up and ABCD: Any Body Can Dance
- "Happy Birthday Mickey" (Bollywood celebrities Ranbir Kapoor, Deepika Padukone, Sushant Singh Rajput, Jacqueline Fernandez, Meet Bros, Sunidhi Chauhan, Varun Dhawan, Shraddha Kapoor, Anushka Sharma, Alia Bhatt, Amit Trivedi, Shaan, Nargis Fakhri, Riteish Deshmukh, Aditya Roy Kapur, Tiger Shroff, Sidharth Malhotra and Kailash Kher wishing Mickey Mouse Happy Birthday)
- "Sab Sahi Hai Bro" (promotional song for Aladdin's Indian release performed by Badshah)

== See also ==
- List of programs broadcast by Disney Channel (India)
- List of programs broadcast by Hungama TV
- List of Disney television films
