= List of programmes broadcast by Disney Channel (India) =

Disney Star

This is a list of television programmes that are currently airing on Disney Channel in India.

== Current programming ==
- Doraemon
- Mickey Mouse Clubhouse
- Monkey and Trunk
- Ninja Hattori
- Perman

== Former programming ==
=== Live-action ===
- Aaron Stone
- Agadam Bagdam Tigdam
- Akkad Bakkad Bambey Bo
- Austin & Ally
- Backyard Science
- Bear in the Big Blue House
- Best of Luck Nikki
- Big Bada Boom
- The Book of Pooh
- Boy Meets World
- Break Time Masti Time
- Captain Tiao
- Cory in the House
- Dhoom Machaao Dhoom
- Disney Q Family Mastermind
- Dog with a Blog
- Even Stevens
- Gabbar Poonchwala
- Goosebumps
- Hannah Montana
- Hatim
- Hip Hip Hurray
- Imagination Movers
- Ishaan: Sapno Ko Awaaz De
- Johnny and the Sprites
- Jonas L.A.
- Jessie
- Kaarthika
- Karishma Kaa Karishma
- Kya Mast Hai Life
- Life with Derek
- Lizzie McGuire
- Mai Ka Lal
- Mortified
- Nach to the Groove
- Naturally, Sadie
- Oye Jassie
- Palak Pe Jhalak
- Patito Feo
- Phil of the Future
- Rayana's Mysteries Adventures
- Sanya
- Shaka Laka Boom Boom
- Shake It Up (India)
- Shake It Up (US)
- Shararat
- So Random!
- So Weird
- Son Pari
- Sonny with a Chance
- Soy Luna
- Soy Luna Live
- The Famous Jett Jackson
- The Lodge
- The Next Step
- The Suite Life of Karan & Kabir
- Studio Disney
- The Suite Life of Zack & Cody
- The Suite Life on Deck
- Take Two with Phineas and Ferb
- That's So Raven
- Vicky & Vetaal
- Welcome to Pooh Corner
- Wizards of Waverly Place
- Zindagi Khatti Meethi

=== Animated series ===
- 3 Amigonauts
- 101 Dalmatians: The Series
- Action Dad
- Aladdin
- American Dragon: Jake Long
- Amphibia
- Astra Force
- Arjun — Prince of Bali
- Being Ian
- Big City Greens
- Brandy & Mr. Whiskers
- Bunnytown
- Buzz Lightyear of Star Command
- The Buzz on Maggie
- Camp Lakebottom
- Cars Toons
- The Cat in the Hat Knows a Lot About That!
- Chuggington
- Clifford the Big Red Dog
- Dave the Barbarian
- The Deep
- Donald Duck Presents
- Donkey Kong Country
- DuckTales
- Ek Tha Jungle
- The Emperor's New School
- Fillmore!
- Fish Hooks
- Gaju Bhai
- Get Ace
- The Ghost and Molly McGee
- Good Morning, Mickey!
- Goof Troop
- Grami's Circus Show
- Gravity Falls
- Hamtaro
- Handy Manny
- Higglytown Heroes
- The Hive
- Hotel Transylvania: The Series
- House of Mouse
- How to Draw?
- Jake and the Never Land Pirates
- JoJo's Circus
- Jungle Cubs
- Jungle Junction
- Kid VS Kat
- Kim Possible
- Rudra Boom Chick Chick Bomm
- The Legend of Tarzan
- Lilo & Stitch: The Series
- The Lion Guard
- Little Einsteins
- The Little Mermaid
- Madeline
- Mickey and the Roadster Racers
- Mickey Mouse
- Mickey Mouse and Friends
- The Mickey Mouse Club
- Mickey Mouse Clubhouse
- Miles from Tomorrowland
- Miraculous: Tales of Ladybug & Cat Noir
- Mona & Sketch
- Mysteries and Feluda
- The New Adventures of Winnie the Pooh
- Octonauts
- Oddbods
- Oswaldo
- Phineas and Ferb
- PJ Masks
- Pocoyo
- The Proud Family
- Quack Pack
- The Replacements
- Recess
- Rolie Polie Olie
- Sofia the First
- Special Agent Oso
- Stanley
- Stitch!
- Super V
- TaleSpin
- Teamo Supremo
- Timon & Pumbaa
- Totally Spies
- Tsum Tsum
- V 4 Viraat
- Ultra B
- Upin and Ipin
- Wild About Safety
- Wander Over Yonder

== Films ==
- Feluda: The Kathmandu Caper (1 January 2011)
- Luck Luck Ki Baat (30 September 2012)
- Apna Bhai Gaju Bhai (3 July 2016)

== See also ==
- Disney India
- List of Disney Channel (India) series
- List of Indian animated television series
- List of programs broadcast by Hungama TV
