= List of programmes broadcast by Super Hungama =

Disney Star

This is a list of television programmes that are currently airing or has aired on Super Hungama in India; formerly known as Marvel HQ (2019–2022), Disney XD (2009–2019), and Toon Disney/Jetix (2004–2009).

== Current programming ==
=== Animated series ===
- Ejen Ali
- Pokémon
- Supa Strikas

== Former programming ==
=== Animated series ===
- A.T.O.M
- The Adventures of King Vikram
- Aladdin
- Almost Naked Animals
- American Dragon: Jake Long
- Arjun – Prince of Bali
- Atomic Puppet
- The Avengers: Earth's Mightiest Heroes
- Avengers Assemble
- B-Daman Crossfire
- Beyblade
- Big City Greens
- Buzz Lightyear of Star Command
- Camp Lakebottom
- Captain Biceps
- Captain Flamingo
- Chacha Bhatija
- Chai Chai
- Chip 'n Dale: Rescue Rangers
- Chorr Police
- Cingkus Blues
- Dennis the Menace
- Dennis the Menace and Gnasher
- Dragon Booster
- Fantastic Four
- Fillmore!
- Freaktown
- Gadget & the Gadgetinis
- Galactik Football
- George of the Jungle
- Get Ed
- Gravity Falls
- Gon the Stone Age Boy
- Guardians of the Galaxy
- Heroman
- Howzzattt
- Hulk and the Agents of S.M.A.S.H.
- Huntik: Secrets & Seekers
- The Incredible Hulk
- Infinity Nado
- Inspector Chingum
- Inspector Gadget
- Iron Man
- Iron Man: Armored Adventures
- Journey to the West: Legends of the Monkey King
- Kick Buttowski: Suburban Daredevil
- Kid vs. Kat
- Kim Possible
- Kiteretsu
- KochiKame
- Kung Fu Bunny
- The Legend of Tarzan
- Lego Marvel Shorts: Avengers Reassembled
- Lego Star Wars: Droid Tales
- Lego Star Wars: The Freemaker Adventures
- Lego Star Wars: The Resistance Rises
- Lego Star Wars: The Yoda Chronicles
- Little Moonlight Rider
- Luckyman
- Luv Kushh
- Marvel Funko Shorts
- Mickey Mouse
- Milo Murphy's Law
- Monster Buster Club
- Motorcity
- Mysteries and Feluda
- Nintama Rantarō
- P5 – Pandavas 5
- Packages from Planet X
- Pat & Stan
- Phineas and Ferb
- Pokémon
- Randy Cunningham: 9th Grade Ninja
- Ratz
- Recess
- Redakai: Conquer the Kairu
- Rekkit Rabbit
- Scaredy Squirrel
- Shuriken School
- Sidekick
- Slugterra
- Spider-Man (1994)
- Spider-Man (2017)
- Spider-Man and His Amazing Friends
- Spider-Man Unlimited
- Splatalot!
- Star Wars Rebels
- The Super Hero Squad Show
- Super Robot Monkey Team Hyperforce Go!
- Star vs. the Forces of Evil
- Supa Strikas
- TaleSpin
- Time Warp Trio
- Timon & Pumbaa
- Tron: Uprising
- The Twisted Whiskers Show
- Tutenstein
- Two More Eggs
- Ultimate Spider-Man
- Upin & Ipin
- ViR: The Robot Boy
- Voltron Force
- Wander Over Yonder
- W.I.T.C.H
- World of Quest
- Yin Yang Yo!
- Ultra B
- American Dragon: Jake Long
- Aryamaan – Brahmaand Ka Yodha
- Dennis the Menace
- Detective Conan
- Didi's Comedy Show (premiered May 7, 2007)
- Fantastic Four
- Gargoyles
- George of the Jungle
- G.I. Joe: Sigma 6
- Goosebumps
- Hero – Bhakti Hi Shakti Hai
- The Incredible Hulk
- Inspector Gadget
- Martin Mystery
- Monster Warriors
- The Owl
- Power Rangers Lightspeed Rescue
- Power Rangers Lost Galaxy
- Power Rangers RPM
- Power Rangers Wild Force
- Rat-Man
- So Weird
- Spider-Man
- Spider-Man: The Animated Series
- Spider-Man and His Amazing Friends
- Spider-Man Unlimited
- Storm Hawks (premiered April 21, 2008)
- The Owl
- Total Drama Island (premiered March 21, 2009)
- Tutenstein (premiered October 17, 2005)
- Urban Vermin (premiered April 21, 2008)
- Vicky & Vetaal
- World of Quest
- WWE 24X7 (premiered May 7, 2007)
- X-Men
- Zoran

=== Live-action ===
- Aaron Stone
- Agadam Bagdam Tigdam
- Big Bad Beetleborgs
- Goosebumps
- Hero - Bhakti Hi Shakti Hai
- I'm in the Band
- Mech-X4
- Mighty Morphin Power Rangers
- Pair of Kings
- Power Rangers Dino Thunder
- Power Rangers Jungle Fury
- Power Rangers Lightspeed Rescue
- Power Rangers Lost Galaxy
- Power Rangers Mystic Force
- Power Rangers Ninja Storm
- Power Rangers Operation Overdrive
- Power Rangers RPM
- Power Rangers S.P.D.
- Power Rangers Time Force
- Power Rangers Wild Force
- Rescue Force
- Ryukendo
- Shaka Laka Boom Boom
- Telematch
- Vicky & Vetaal
- VR Troopers
- Zeke and Luther
- Zoran

=== Movies ===
- 20,000 Leagues Under the Sea
- The Amazing Zorro
- Casper
- Casper: A Spirited Beginning
- Casper Meets Wendy
- Finding Nemo
- Flubber
- Gargoyles the Movie: The Heroes Awaken
- George of the Jungle
- George of the Jungle 2
- Herbie: Fully Loaded
- Halloweentown
- Hulk
- Inspector Gadget's Last Case
- Monsters, Inc.
- Right on Track
- Sky High
- Tarzan
- X-Men

== See also ==
- Disney XD India
- Disney Junior India
- Disney Channel India
- List of programmes broadcast by Disney Channel (Indian TV channel)
- List of programmes broadcast by Hungama TV
