= Saumya Daan =

Indian voice actor

- Born: 2 March 1982 (age 44); Mumbai, India
- Other name: Soumya Daan
- Occupations: Voice actor customer service assistant
- Years active: 1994–Current
- Website: www.sdaan7.wix.com/voicelife

Saumya Daan (born 2 March 1982 in Mumbai) is an Indian voice actor who speaks English, Hindi, Marathi and Bengali and worked as a customer service assistant with Jet Airways until 2010, leaving to become a full-time voice actor.

== Filmography ==
=== Commercials ===
Year	Promo	Language
2009	Star Plus – Get Plus	Hindi
2009	Loop Mobile In the Loop	Hindi
2009	Indian Idol Radio Spot Promotion	Hindi

== Dubbing roles ==
=== Animated series ===
Program title	Original voice	Character	Dub language	Original language	Number of episodes	Original airdate	Dubbed airdate	Notes
Spider-Man: The New Animated Series	Neil Patrick Harris	Peter Parker / Spider-Man	Hindi	English	13	11 July – 12 September 2003	2003	Aired on Cartoon Network India.
The Spectacular Spider-Man	Josh Keaton	Peter Parker / Spider-Man	Hindi	English	26	8 March 2008 – 18 November 2009		
The Avengers: Earth's Mightiest Heroes	Drake Bell	Peter Parker / Spider-Man	Hindi	English	52	22 September 2010 – 5 May 2013		Aired by Disney XD.
Ultimate Spider-Man	Drake Bell	Peter Parker / Spider-Man	Hindi	English	104	1 April 2012 – 7 January 2017		Aired by Disney XD and it also aired on Marvel HQ.
Avengers Assemble	Drake Bell Robbie Daymond	Peter Parker / Spider-Man	Hindi	English	126	26 May 2013 – 24 February 2019		Aired by Disney XD and it also aired on Marvel HQ.
Monsuno	Keith Silverstein	Dax	Hindi	English	65	23 February 2012 – 1 July 2014		
The Archie Show	Unknown voice actor	Unknown character	Hindi	English	17	9/14/1968- 30 August 1969	Unknown	Dubbed and aired on television, much later after the original airing.
Dave the Barbarian	Danny Cooksey	Dave	Hindi	English	21	1/23/2004- 22 January 2005	Unknown	
We Bare Bears	Bobby Moynihan Demetri Martin	Panda Ice bear	Hindi	English		27/7/2015- Ongoing	29/11/2015- Ongoing	This TV series is being dubbed by Sound & Vision India and it's currently airing on Cartoon Network India.
Pokémon	First Dub; Mamoru Miyano(JP); Jason Griffith(EN); Second dub Inuyama (JP); Nathan Price (Episodes 2–33); Maddie Blaustein (Seasons 1–8); James Carter Cathcart (Seasons 9-present) (EN)	First Dub; Cilan (Dent); Second dub Meowth (Nyarth)	Hindi	Japanese	1000+	4/1/1997-Current	First dub 5/12/2003-2015 (India); 2004–Current (Pakistan); Second dub 5/19/2014-Current	The First 8 seasons dubbed, were based on the 4Kids Entertainment English dub. The later seasons were also dubbed in Hindi and are also revised translations based on the English dub. A Second Hindi dub has been produced by UTV Software Communications featuring a new Hindi voice cast and translation and aired on Hungama TV. Saumya Daan was involved in both Hindi dub productions. He voiced Clian in the first Hindi dub and Meowth in the second Hindi dub. Damandeep Singh Baggan originally voiced Meowth in the first Hindi dub from Season 1-2 and Sandeep Karnik from Season 3-14, which was produced by Sound & Vision India.
Digimon Adventure	Masami Kikuchi	Joe-Kido	Hindi	Japanese	54	1 August 1999 – 2000	2003-2004	He voiced Joe in Digimon Adventure 01 and 02 which was made by Sound and Vision India and aired on Cartoon Network India.
Young Justice	Nolan North Crispin Freeman	Clark Kent / Superman Roy Harper/ Red Arrow / Arsenal	Hindi	English	52	November 26, 2010 – March 16, 2013	2017-2018 (Cartoon Network India); May 2, 2024 (Netflix)	Season 1 and 2 aired on Cartoon Network India. Season 1, 2 & 3 are available on Netflix.

=== Live action television series ===
Program title	Actor	Character	Dub language	Original language	Episodes	Original airdate	Dubbed airdate	Notes
Small Wonder	Jerry Supiran	Jamie Lawson	Hindi	English	96	9/7/1985-5/20/1989	1994–1998	Debut role for Saumya. Aired on Star Plus from 1994–1998.
Diff'rent Strokes	Todd Bridges	Willis Jackson	Hindi	English	189 (Dubbed ???)	11/3/1978- 3/6/1986	1995–1999	The Hindi dubbed version of this sitcom, premiered in the late 90s, from 1995 till 1999 on Sony Entertainment Television and on Doordarshan.
Alif Laila	Unknown actor	Unknown character	Hindi	Urdu; Hindi; Bengali	260 (Dubbed ???)	1993–1996		
Even Stevens	Shia LaBeouf	Louis Anthony Stevens	Hindi	English	65	6/17/2000- 13 June 2003	Unknown	Aired on UTV, dubbed in Hindi.
Power Rangers Zeo	Jason David Frank	Thomas "Tommy" Oliver/Zeo Ranger V - Red	Hindi	English	50	April 20, 1996 - November 27, 1996	Unknown	Based on Japanese Tokusatsu, Chouriki Sentai Ohranger.
Power Rangers Turbo	Jason David Frank	Thomas "Tommy" Oliver/Red Turbo Ranger	Hindi	English	45 (19 dubbed)	April 19, 1997 - November 24, 1997	Unknown	Based on Japanese Tokusatsu, Gekisou Sentai Carranger.
Power Rangers Ninja Storm	Jason Chan	Cameron "Cam" Watanabe/Green Samurai Ranger	Hindi	English	38	February 15, 2003 - November 15, 2003	Unknown	Based on Japanese Tokusatsu, Ninpuu Sentai Hurricaneger.
Power Rangers SPD	Chris Violette	Sky Tate/S.P.D. Blue Ranger	Hindi	English	38	February 5, 2005 - November 14, 2005	Unknown	Based on Japanese Tokusatsu, Tokusou Sentai Dekaranger.
Power Rangers Samurai/Super Samurai	Steven Skyler	Antonio Garcia/Gold Samurai Ranger	Hindi	English	23 (Samurai) 22 (Super Samurai)	February 7, 2011 - December 10, 2011 (Samurai) February 18, 2012- December 15, 2012 (Super Samurai)	Unknown	Based on Japanese Tokusatsu, Samurai Sentai Shinkenger.
Dharti Ka Veer Yodha Prithviraj Chauhan	Rajat Tokas	Prithviraj Chauhan (Prithvi Raj III)	Hindi		382	5/12/2006– 15 March 2009		Saumya was called in to dub the dialogues during post-production due to the dissatisfaction of the director with the lines spoken by the actors. The original performers were unable to convey their lines properly due to health problems, despite that these shows were already shot in Hindi.
Dharam Veer	Vikrant Massey	Dharam	Hindi		195	1/21/2008– 30 October 2008		Saumya was called in to dub the dialogues during post-production due to the dissatisfaction of the director with the lines spoken by the actors. The original performers were unable to convey their lines properly due to health problems, despite that these shows were already shot in Hindi.
Jonas L.A.	Joe Jonas	Joe Jonas	Hindi	English	34	5/2/2009- 10/3/2010	11/30/2009- 2011(?)	
The Kennedys	Unknown	Unknown	Hindi	English	8	4/3/2011- 4/10/2011	6/??/2012	Aired on History TV18 in June 2012.
Adını Feriha Koydum	Yusuf Akgün	Koray Onat	Hindi	Turkish	80	1/14/2011- 6/28/2012	9/15/2015-3/2016	Airs on Zee Zindagi dubbed in Hindi. Voiced him for all 80 episodes.

=== Live action films ===
==== Hollywood films ====
Film title	Actor(s)	Character(s)	Dub language	Original language	Original Year release	Dub Year release	Notes
Harry Potter and the Philosopher's Stone	James and Oliver Phelps	Fred and George Weasley	Hindi	English	2001	2002	Released in the US, India, and Pakistan as Harry Potter and the Sorcerer's Stone.
Harry Potter and the Chamber of Secrets	James and Oliver Phelps	Fred and George Weasley	Hindi	English	2002	2003	
Harry Potter and the Prisoner of Azkaban	James and Oliver Phelps	Fred and George Weasley	Hindi	English	2004	2004	
Harry Potter and the Goblet of Fire	James and Oliver Phelps	Fred and George Weasley	Hindi	English	2005	2005	
Harry Potter and the Order of the Phoenix	James and Oliver Phelps	Fred and George Weasley	Hindi	English	2007	2007	
Harry Potter and the Half-Blood Prince	James and Oliver Phelps	Fred and George Weasley	Hindi	English	2009	2009	
Harry Potter and the Deathly Hallows – Part 1	James and Oliver Phelps	Fred and George Weasley	Hindi	English	2010	2010	
Harry Potter and the Deathly Hallows – Part 2	James and Oliver Phelps	Fred and George Weasley	Hindi	English	2011	2011	
Bad Boys	Will Smith	Det. Mike Lowrey	Hindi	English	1995	2010	Was dubbed into Hindi much later, when it was released on VCD/DVD.
Holes	Shia LaBeouf	Stanley "Caveman" Yelnats IV	Hindi	English	2003	Unknown	
Bobby	Shia LaBeouf	Cooper	Hindi	English	2006	2006	
Disturbia	Shia LaBeouf	Kale Brecht	Hindi	English; Spanish; Japanese	2007	2007	
Transformers	Shia LaBeouf	Sam Witwicky	Hindi	English	2007	2007	
Transformers: Revenge of the Fallen	Shia LaBeouf	Sam Witwicky	Hindi	English	2009	2009	
Transformers: Dark of the Moon	Shia LaBeouf	Sam Witwicky	Hindi	English	2011	2011	
Indiana Jones and the Kingdom of the Crystal Skull	Shia LaBeouf	Henry "Mutt Williams" Jones III	Hindi	English	2008	2008	
National Treasure	Justin Bartha	Riley Poole	Hindi	English	2004	2004	
National Treasure: Book of Secrets	Justin Bartha	Riley Poole	Hindi	English	2007	2007	
The Departed	Leonardo DiCaprio	William "Billy" Costigan, Jr.	Hindi	English	2006	2008	VCD/DVD version releases.
Live Free or Die Hard	Justin Long	Matthew "Matt" Farrell	Hindi	English	2007	2007	Internationally released as: Die Hard 4.0.
Camp Rock	Joe Jonas	Shane Gray	Hindi	English	2008	2009	Aired Summer 2009.
Camp Rock 2: The Final Jam	Joe Jonas	Shane Gray	Hindi	English	2010	2010	Aired September 2010.
Predators	Topher Grace	Edwin	Hindi	English	2010	2010	
The Smurfs	Anton Yelchin	Clumsy Smurf (voice)	Hindi	English	2011	2011	American Live Action film mixed with CGI animation.
The Smurfs 2	Anton Yelchin	Clumsy Smurf (voice)	Hindi	English	2013	2013	American Live Action film mixed with CGI animation.
Rise of the Planet of the Apes	Tom Felton	Dodge Landon	Hindi	English	2011	2011	
Final Destination 5	Arlen Escarpeta	Nathan Sears	Hindi	English	2011	2011	
The Darkest Hour	Max Minghella	Ben	Hindi	English; Russian	2011	2012	
Battleship	Taylor Kitsch	Lt. Alex Hopper	Hindi	English	2012	2012	
V for Vendetta	Hugo Weaving	V (Second Dub)	Hindi	English	2005	2012	Voiced for the UTV Software Communications in-house production Hindi dub that aired on UTV Action.

==== Indian films ====
Film title	Actor(s)	Character(s)	Dub language	Original language	Original Year release	Dub Year release	Notes
Love U...Mr. Kalakaar!	Prashant Ranyal	Aman	Hindi	Hindi	2011	2011	Saumya was called in to dub the dialogues during post-production because of the dissatisfaction of the director with the lines spoken by the actual actor. Prashant were unable to convey his lines properly due to temporary health problems, despite that this movie was already shot in Hindi.
Pokiri	Mahesh Babu	Krishna Manohar aka "Pandu" (Sanju in Hindi version)	Hindi	Telugu	2006	2010	The Hindi dub was titled: Tapori Wanted.

=== Animated films ===
Film title	Original voice(s)	Character(s)	Dub language	Original language	Original Year release	Dub Year release	Notes
The Incredibles	Michael Bird	Tony Rydinger	Hindi	English	2004	2004	The Hindi dub released as Hum Hain Lajawab.
A Christmas Carol	Jim Carrey	Ghost of Christmas Past	Hindi	English	2009	2011	Dubbed for TV
Moana	Oscar Kightley Troy Polamalu	Fisherman Villager #1	Hindi	English	2016	2016	

=== Indian TV series ===
Little Singham, he voiced Ballu, Chikki, and Professor Avishkar in this show.

== See also ==
- Dubbing (filmmaking)
- List of Indian dubbing artists
