= Bindass Play =

Indian television channel (2014-2017)

- Country: India
- Broadcast area: India
- Headquarters: Mumbai, India

Programming
- Language: Hindi
- Picture format: 576i (4:3 SDTV)

Ownership
- Owner: Disney India Media Networks
- Sister channels: Bindass; Disney Channel (India); Disney Junior (India); Disney XD (India); Hungama TV; UTV Movies; UTV Action

History
- Launched: 1 October 2014; 11 years ago
- Replaced: UTV Stars
- Closed: 29 October 2017; 8 years ago
- Replaced by: Disney International HD

Links
- Website: Official website

Bindass Play was a Hindi Indian music television channel based in India, owned by The Walt Disney Company (India). The channel was launched on 1 October 2014 and replaced the HD Bollywood news and entertainment channel, UTV Stars.

The channel was shut down on 29 October 2017 and has been replaced with Disney International HD, the first Disney-branded HD channel in India. Bindass Play content moved to the Bindass channel.
