= Damandeep Singh Baggan =

Indian actor and voice actor (born 1977)

- Born: Patiala, Punjab, India
- Other names: Daman Baggan; Damandeep Singh
- Occupations: Actor, voice artist
- Years active: 2003–present
- Notable work: The Suite Life of Karan & Kabir

Damandeep Singh Baggan is an Indian actor and also a dub-over voice actor. He is also named as Daman Baggan for short.

In addition to Punjabi, his native language, he speaks English and Hindi. He has dubbed in Hindi for Jim Carrey's roles, among other actors.

== Filmography ==
- 2001 - Tera Mera Saath Rahen
- 2003 - Ishq Vishk
- 2006 - Vivah
- 2008 - Fashion
- 2008 - Ek Vivaah... Aisa Bhi as Happy Singh
- 2009 - Straight as Pakwan Singh

=== Television ===
Year	Show	Role	Language	Notes
2003	The Adventures of Tenali Raman	Tenali Rama	Hindi	Voice role
2006	Vicky & Vetaal	Paddu (Spell book)	Hindi	Voice role
2011	Tripura – The Three Cities of Maya	Tarakaksha	English / Hindi	Voice role Animated TV Movie
2011	Best of Luck Nikki (season 1)	Reporter Sukhwinder	Hindi	Episode 14 "Nikki goes Viral"
2012	Luck Luck Ki Baat	Ifrit Bula Bin Abdulla	Hindi	Television film
2012–2013	The Suite Life of Karan & Kabir	Mr. Mann Singh	Hindi	Indian adaptation of the American show The Suite Life of Zack & Cody; Role equivalent of Mr. Moseby
2012	Best of Luck Nikki (season 2)	Mr. Mann Singh	Hindi	Episode 15 "The Suite Life of Singh Sisters crossover episode with The Suite Life of Karan & Kabir"
2016-2018	Gaju Bhai	Gaju Bhai	Hindi	Voice role
2016	Apna Bhai Gaju Bhai	Gaju Bhai	Hindi	Voice role TV Movie Based on TV series

== Dubbing career ==
He's been dubbing for channels such as Sony Entertainment Television, SAB and Zee TV.

Have been a brand ambassador for Mountain Dew (a Pepsi product), Tata Indicom, Aircel, Maruti Suzuki Swift .. IPL Kings xi Punjab, Ad Serials: Hotel Kingston (Star One), Pepsi ADA (Sahara One), Playhouse Disney (Disney Channel), Sunn Yaar Chill Maar (Bindaas channel), Dil Mil Gaye (Star One)

== Dubbing roles ==
=== Animated series ===
Title	Character	Language	Airdate	Notes
Krish, Trish and Baltiboy	Krish	Hindi; English	2009–2013	
Shaktimaan: The Animated Series	Vehaan Arya / Shaktimaan	Hindi; English	2013	
The Legend of Hanuman	Hanumana	Hindi	2021–2025	Airing on Disney Plus Hotstar

=== Live action television series ===
Program title	Actor	Character	Dub language	Original language	Episodes	Original airdate	Dubbed airdate	Notes
Power Rangers S.P.D.	Brandon Jay McLaren	Jack Landors / Red S.P.D. Ranger	Hindi	English	38	2/5/2005- 11/14/2005	Unknown	
Titans	Robbie Jones	Faddei	Hindi	English		2018-Current	2019-current	

=== Animated series ===
Program title	Original voice	Character	Dub language	Original language	Number of episodes	Original airdate	Dubbed airdate	Notes
The Batman	Rino Romano	Bruce Wayne / Batman	Hindi	English	65	9/11/2004- 3/8/2008		
Foster's Home for Imaginary Friends	Keith Ferguson Phil LaMarr	Bloo Wilt	Hindi	English	77	8/13/2004- 5/3/2009		Damandeep has voiced two characters in the Hindi dub.
Codename: Kids Next Door	Dee Bradley Baker	Numbuh 4	Hindi	English	78	12/6/2002-1/21/2008		
Avatar: The Last Airbender	Dante Basco	Zuko	Hindi	English	61	2005-2008		
Transformers: Prime	James Horan	Wheeljack	Hindi	English	65	29 November 2010 – 26 July 2013		
Pokémon	Inuko Inuyama (JP); Matthew Sussman (Episodes 2–33); Maddie Blaustein (Seasons 1–8); James Carter Cathcart (Seasons 9-) (EN)	Meowth (Nyrath)	Hindi	Japanese	1000+ (dubbed 2 seasons)	4/1/1997-Current	First dub 5/12/2003-10/2013 (India); 2004–Current (Pakistan); Second dub 5/19/2014-Current	The first 8 seasons dubbed, were based on the 4Kids Entertainment English dub. The later seasons were also dubbed in Hindi and are also revised translations based on the English dub. A second Hindi dub has been produced by UTV Software Communications featuring a new Hindi voice cast and translation and aired on Hungama TV. Damandeep Singh Baggan was involved in the first Hindi dub as the voice of this character produced by Crest Animation Studios followed by Sound & Vision India throughout the first two seasons. Sandeep Karnik took over in season 3. Saumya Daan voiced this character in the second Hindi dub.
Naruto	Hōchū Ōtsuka	Jiraiya	Hindi	Japanese	220	October 3, 2002 – February 8, 2007	August 15, 2022 - August 4, 2023	Aired on Sony YAY
Naruto Shippuden	Hōchū Ōtsuka	Jiraiya	Hindi	Japanese	500	February 15, 2007 – March 23, 2017	March 18, 2024 – Present	Airing on Sony YAY

=== Live action films ===
==== Indian films ====
Film title	Actor	Character	Dub language	Original language	Original Year Release	Dub Year Release	Note
Alag	Akshay Kapoor	Tejas H Rastogi	Hindi	Hindi	2006		
Namastey London	Upen Patel	Imran Khan	Hindi	Hindi	2007		
Dum Maaro Dum	Rana Daggubati	DJ Joaquim "Joki" Fernandes	Hindi	Hindi	2011		
Arya	Allu Arjun	Arya	Hindi	Telugu	2004	2011	The Hindi dub was titled: "Arya Ki Prem Pratigya".
Arya 2	Allu Arjun	Arya	Hindi	Telugu	2009	2010	The Hindi dub was titled: "Arya Ek Deewana".
Jalsa	Pawan Kalyan	Sanjay Sahu "Sanju"	Hindi	Telugu	2008	2012	The Hindi dub was titled: "Yeh Hai Jalsa".
Arundhati	Sonu Sood (voice in original version dubbed by P. Ravi Shankar)	Pasupathi	Hindi	Telugu; Tamil	2009	2013	The Hindi dub was titled: "Arundhati: Ek Anokhi Kahani".
Singam II	Suriya	DCP Durai Singam (Surya Singham in Hindi version)	Hindi	Tamil	2013	2013	The Hindi dub was titled: "Main Hoon Surya Singham 2". This refers to the second part of the Singam franchise. Sanket Mhatre dubbed this role in the first part's Hindi dub and Aditya Raj Sharma dubbed in the third part's Hindi dub released in 2012 and 2017 respectively.
Paiyaa	Karthi	Shiva	Hindi	Tamil	2010	2013	The Hindi dub was titled: "Aakhri Baazi".
Dear Comrade	Vijay Devarakonda	Comrade Chaitanya Krishna "Bobby"	Hindi	Telugu	2019	2020	Performed alongside Muskaan Jafri who voiced Rashmika Mandanna as Aparna "Lilly" Devi in Hindi.
Carry On Jatta 2	Binnu Dhillon	Goldie Dhillon	Hindi	Punjabi	2018	2020	The Hindi dub was titled: "Carry On Balle Balle".
Action	Vishal	Col. Subash	Hindi	Tamil	2019	2020	
Dwaraka	Vijay Devarakonda	Erra Srinu "Arjun" / Sri Krishnananda Swamy	Hindi	Telugu	2017	2020	
Idhaya Thirudan	Jayam Ravi	T. Mahesh	Hindi	Tamil	2006	2020	The Hindi dub was titled: "Mard Ki Zaban 3".
Aadyaa	Chiranjeevi Sarja †	Aditya Shankar	Hindi	Kannada	2020	2021	
Bigil	Arjan Bajwa	Samar	Hindi	Tamil	2019	2022	
Varisu	S. J. Suryah	Adithya Mittal	Hindi	Tamil	2023	2023	
Oh! Baby	Naga Shaurya	Vikram	Hindi	Telugu	2019	2023	
Oh! Baby	Naga Chaitanya	Young Chanti	Hindi	Telugu	2019	2023	
Cold Case	Prithviraj Sukumaran	ACP M. Sathyajith IPS	Hindi	Malayalam	2021	2023	The Hindi dub was titled: "Police Story 2".
Mark Antony	Vishal	Mark (son) and Antony (father)	Hindi	Tamil	2023	2023	
Maharshi	Kamal Kamaraju	S. Ajay Babu	Hindi	Telugu	2019	2024	
Shadow	Venkatesh	Rajaram	Hindi	Telugu	2013	2013	The Hindi dub was titled: "Meri Jung - One Man Army".
Good Bad Ugly	Redin Kingsley	A convict	Hindi	Tamil	2025	2025	The Hindi dub was direct to Netflix.

==== Hollywood films ====
Film title	Actor	Character	Dub language	Original language	Original Year Release	Dub Year Release	Note
Scooby-Doo	Rowan Atkinson	Emile Mondavarious	Hindi	English	2002		
Night at the Museum	Ben Stiller	Larry Daley	Hindi	English	2006	2006	
Kung Fu Hustle	Stephen Chow	Sing	Hindi	Cantonese Chinese; Mandarin Chinese; English; Hindi	2004	2005	
Liar Liar	Jim Carrey	Fletcher Reede	Hindi	English	1997	2003	
Dumb and Dumber	Jim Carrey	Lloyd Christmas	Hindi	English	1994		Aired by UTV Action
Days of Thunder	Tom Cruise	Cole Trickle	Hindi	English	1990		Was dubbed into Hindi for a later release.
National Security	Martin Lawrence	Earl Montgomery	Hindi	English	2003		
Bruce Almighty	Jim Carrey	Bruce Nolan	Hindi	English	2003	2003	This was his very first Hindi-dubbed film that Damandeep has participated in.
Yes Man	Jim Carrey	Carl Allen	Hindi	English	2008	2008	
Night at the Museum: Battle of the Smithsonian	Ben Stiller	Larry Daley	Hindi	English	2009	2009	
Mr. Popper's Penguins	Jim Carrey	Thomas "Tom" Popper Jr.	Hindi	English	2011	2011	
Anacondas: The Hunt for the Blood Orchid	Eugene Byrd	Cole Burris	Hindi	English	2004	2004	
Bandidas	Steve Zahn	Quentin	Hindi	English; Spanish	2006	2006	
Wanted	James McAvoy	Wesley Gibson	Hindi	English	2008	2008	
Inception	Leonardo DiCaprio	Dom Cobb	Hindi	English	2010	2010	
Mission: Impossible III	Simon Pegg	Benji Dunn	Hindi	English	2006	2006	
Mission: Impossible – Ghost Protocol	Simon Pegg	Benji Dunn	Hindi	English	2011	2011	
Mission: Impossible – Rogue Nation	Simon Pegg	Benji Dunn	Hindi	English	2015	2015	
Superman Returns	Brandon Routh	Clark Kent / Superman	Hindi	English	2006	2006	
102 Dalmatians	Ioan Gruffudd	Kevin Shepherd	Hindi	English	2000	Unknown	
Sherlock Holmes	Robert Downey Jr.	Sherlock Holmes	Hindi	English	2009	Unknown	Aired by UTV Action.
Ninja Assassin	Rain	Raizo	Hindi	English	2009	2009	
Star Wars: The Force Awakens	John Boyega	Finn	Hindi	English	2015	2015	Anuj Gurwara dubbed this character in next film.
The Walk	Joseph Gordon-Levitt	Philippe Petit	Hindi	English	2015	2015	
The Mask	Jim Carrey	Stanley Ipkiss / The Mask	Hindi	English	1994		Aired by UTV Action. Rajeev Raj dubbed this role for Home Media.
The Rock	Nicolas Cage	FBI Special Agent Dr. Stanley Goodspeed	Hindi	English	1996	1996	
S.W.A.T	Jeremy Renner	Officer Brian Gamble	Hindi	English	2003	2003	
The Firm	Tom Cruise	Mitch McDeere	Hindi	English	1993		
Terminator: Dark Fate	Gabriel Luna	Rev-9 (First Dub)	Hindi	English	2019	2019	
Bad Boys for Life	Martin Lawrence	Marcus Burnett	Hindi	English	2020	2020	
Sonic the Hedgehog	Jim Carrey	Dr. Robotnik	Hindi	English	2020	2020	Sumit Kaul dubbed this character in next movies.
Hollow Man 2	Peter Facinelli	Detective Frank Turner	Hindi	English	2006	2006	
Oppenheimer	Rami Malek	David L. Hill	Hindi	English	2023	2023	
Morbius	Jared Leto	Dr Michael Morbius	Hindi	English	2022	2022	
Transformers: Rise of the Beasts	Pete Davidson	Mirage	Hindi	English	2023	2023	
Joker	Joaquin Phoenix	Joker/Arthur Fleck	Hindi	English	2019	2024	The Hindi Dub Was Exclusively Available on Netflix.
Argylle	Sam Rockwell	Aidan Wilde	Hindi	English	2024	2024	
The Fall Guy	Ryan Gosling	Colt Seavers	Hindi	English	2024	2024	The Hindi dub credits have (Credit as DA MAN) after his full name.
Bad Boys: Ride or Die	Martin Lawrence	Det. Lt. Marcus Burnett	Hindi	English	2024	2024	
Deadpool & Wolverine	Channing Tatum	Gambit	Hindi	English	2024	2024	
Mission: Impossible – The Final Reckoning	Greg Tarzan Davis	Degas	Hindi	English	2025	2025	The Hindi dub credits have द मैन after his full name. Kamal Chaturvedi dubbed this character in the previous film Dead Reckoning Part One.

=== Animated films ===
Film title	Actor	Character	Dub language	Original language	Original Year Release	Dub Year Release	Note
Madagascar	Chris Rock	Marty the Zebra	Hindi	English	2005	2005	
Madagascar: Escape 2 Africa	Chris Rock	Marty the Zebra	Hindi	English	2008	2008	
Madagascar 3: Europe's Most Wanted	Chris Rock	Marty the Zebra	Hindi	English	2012	2012	
The Wild	Eddie Izzard	Nigel (Ronjeet)	Hindi	English	2006	2006	Damandeep's name is mentioned in the Hindi dub credits taken from the DVD release of the film. Nigel's name was changed to Ronjeet for the Hindi dub.
Ratatouille	Patton Oswalt	Remy	Hindi	English	2007	2007	
The Batman vs. Dracula	Rino Romano	Bruce Wayne / Batman	Hindi	English	2005		
Transformers Prime Beast Hunters: Predacons Rising	James Horan	Wheeljack	Hindi	Englis	2013	2013	Television film
Planes	Dane Cook	Dusty Crophopper	Hindi	English	2013	2015	
Zootopia	Jason Bateman	Nick Wilde	Hindi	English	2016	2017	Official Hindi dub made by Blue Whale Entertainment and Disney Character Voices International and premiered on Movies OK on 17 September 2017. Performed alongside Neshma Chemburkar who voiced officer Judy Hopps in the Hindi dubbed version.
Spies in Disguise	Will Smith	Lance Sterling	Hindi	English	2019	2020	
The Wild Robot	Pedro Pascal	Fink	Hindi	English	2024	2024	

== See also ==
- Dubbing (filmmaking)
- List of Indian Dubbing Artists
