= Vicky & Vetaal =

Television series

- Genre: Supernatural; Sitcom
- Created by: Nikhat Bhatti
- Written by: Swanand Kirkire
- Directed by: Suraj Rao
- Creative director: Nikhat Bhatti
- Starring: Damandeep Singh Baggan (voice); Vishal Malhotra; Dev Kantawala; Kritika Sharma
- Theme music composer: Shantanu Moitra
- Country of origin: India
- Original language: Hindi

Production
- Executive producer: Ali Fazal
- Producers: Prem Krishen; Sunil Mehta
- Cinematography: Selina Sheth
- Editor: Afzal Shaikh
- Running time: 20–22 minutes
- Production company: Cinevistaas Limited

Original release
- Network: Disney Channel
- Release: 6 October 2006 – 17 March 2007
- Release: 15 November 2015 – 2016

Vicky & Vetaal is an Indian supernatural sitcom which premiered on Disney Channel India. It is comparable to the American series Phil of the Future. The series, produced by Cinevistaas Limited, was launched on 7 October 2006 as the first major original production of the network, and Disney's first locally produced live-action Hindi-language series. The show was planned to be the first of a string of five local productions due to get released within a year's span, and was followed by Dhoom Machaao Dhoom, Agadam Bagdam Tigdam, Break Time Masti Time and Nach to the Groove. The series stars Dev Kantawala as Vicky and Vishal Malhotra as Vetaal. The second season of the series premiered on Disney Channel on 15 November 2015 with a different cast.

The show is based on the Baital Pachisi collection of tales about the semi-legendary King Vikram, identified as Vikramāditya, and the Vetala, a huge vampire-like being.

== Synopsis ==
=== Season 1 ===
The main characters of the series are Vicky, a brave and intelligent sixth standard boy and Vetaal, a friendly but foolish ghost whom only Vicky can see. Vicky released Vetaal accidentally after Vetaal had been hanging from a tree in a school for 300 years and since then their fate has been tied together (much to their dismay) and they have to go along together everywhere followed by "Paddu", Vetaal's living book of magic. The episodes mostly revolves around mishaps in Vicky's life and Vetaal's brave but foolish attempts to save the day often leading to additional troubles for Vicky.

The series is primarily a comedy series with stand-alone episodes. It was one of the favourites among kids hosted by Disney Channel at that time.

=== Season 2 ===
Vicky and his family move into their new house but Vicky and his grandma Gomti are upset about leaving their friends behind when they bump into the 300 year old ghost, Vetaal and his companion, the 1000 year old book of spells, Paddu. They realise that only they can see them and that this has been Vetaal and Paddu's home for years. After a lot of confusion and scary moments, eventually all 4 realise that each of them are harmless and end up becoming friends and excited to be living together in one house.

== Cast ==
=== Season 1 ===
- Vishal Malhotra as Veetal
- Dev Kantawala as Vikram "Vicky" Sharma
- Damandeep Singh Baggan as the voice of Paddu
- Girish Pardeshi as Anil Sharma
- Pubali Sanyal as Shikha Sharma
- Jai Thakkar as Siddheshwaran "Sid" Khanna
- Yash Shah as Ashish
- Shivani Joshi as Meghna
- Kritika Sharma as Sanjana
- Suhail More as Jumbo
- Swapnali Kulkarni as Sabha
- Aakansha Kapil as Malika Ma'am
- Kenneth Desai as Principal Kapoor

=== Season 2 ===
- Devansh Doshi as Veetal and Betaal
- Sadhil Kapoor as Vikram 'Vicky' Sharma
- Mazel Vyas as Jelly Sharma (Vicky's sister)
- Shanoor Mirza as the voice of Paddu

== Broadcast ==
The series also re-aired on Disney XD, Jetix and Hungama TV.

== See also ==
- Vicky & Vetaal at IMDb
