= List of Disney television films =

Beginning in the 1950s, The Walt Disney Company began producing made-for-television films in their long-running anthology series Disneyland (later to be popularly known as The Wonderful World of Color and The Wonderful World of Disney). Many of Disney's TV movies were miniseries that aired in installments over several weeks, and a few (such as Davy Crockett and The Scarecrow of Romney Marsh) were later re-edited and released theatrically. During the 1980s, in addition to films made for their weekly TV series, Disney began making original films for their television network, The Disney Channel. After the acquisition of ABC in the 1990s, Disney began co-producing uncharacteristic films (Stephen King's Storm of the Century, Home Alone 4) as well as TV reunion movies (The Facts of Life Reunion, The Growing Pains Movie) and a few in conjunction with Hallmark Entertainment (Dinotopia, Mr. St. Nick, Snow White: The Fairest of Them All).

== 1950s ==
Date	Movie	Notes
January 26, 1955	Davy Crockett	Miniseries
May 29, 1957	Johnny Tremain	
November 14, 1958	Texas John Slaughter	Miniseries
October 2, 1959	Moochie of the Little League	
November 20, 1959	Elfego Baca	

== 1960s ==
Date	Movie	Notes
January 1, 1960	The Swamp Fox	Miniseries
November 20, 1960	Moochie of Pop Warner Football	
October 1, 1961	The Horsemasters	
January 7, 1962	Hans Brinker, or The Silver Skates	
January 21, 1962	Sancho, The Homing Steer	
March 18, 1962	The Prince and the Pauper	
September 30, 1962	Escapade in Florence	
October 28, 1962	Sammy - The Way-Out Seal	
November 18, 1962	The Magnificent Rebel	
December 2, 1962	Mooncussers	
January 13, 1963	Little Dog Lost	
January 20, 1963	Johnny Shiloh	
September 29, 1963	The Horse Without a Head	
October 27, 1963	The Waltz King	
January 5, 1964	The Million Dollar Collar AKA The Ballad of Hector, The Stowaway Dog	
January 24, 1964	The Adventures of Gallegher	
January 25, 1964	Bristle Face	
February 9, 1964	The Scarecrow of Romney Marsh	
March 8, 1964	For the Love of Willadean	
October 18, 1964	The Tenderfoot	Miniseries
September 26, 1965	The Further Adventures of Gallegher	
February 13, 1966	The Legend of Young Dick Turpin	
February 27, 1966	Ballerina	
October 23, 1966	Gallegher Goes West	
January 15, 1967	Mosby's Marauders AKA Willie and the Yank	
February 19, 1967	The Boy Who Flew with Condors	
March 5, 1967	Atta Girl, Kelly!	
November 19, 1967	One Day on Beetle Rock	
December 10, 1967	A Boy Called Nuthin'	
January 7, 1968	Way Down Cellar	
January 28, 1968	Pablo and the Dancing Chihuahua	
February 25, 1968	The Young Loner	
March 31, 1968	Gallegher: The Mystery of Edward Sims	
September 22, 1968	Boomerang, Dog of Many Talents	
November 24, 1968	The Treasure of San Bosco Reef	
January 5, 1969	Solomon, the Sea Turtle	
February 9, 1969	Guns in the Heather AKA The Secret of Boyne Castle	
March 16, 1969	Ride a Northbound Horse	
September 21, 1969	My Dog, The Thief	
October 26, 1969	The Feather Farm	
November 23, 1969	Secrets of the Pirates' Inn	

== 1970s ==
Date	Movie	Notes
February 1, 1970	Smoke	
March 1, 1970	Menace on the Mountain	
September 13, 1970	Cristobalito, the Calypso Colt	
September 20, 1970	The Boy Who Stole the Elephant	
October 18, 1970	The Wacky Zoo of Morgan City	
November 1, 1970	Snow Bear	
November 29, 1970	Hang Your Hat on the Wind	
January 3, 1971	Three Without Fear	
February 7, 1971	The Boy from Dead Man's Bayou AKA Bayou Boy	
March 7, 1971	Hamad and the Pirates	
September 19, 1971	Charlie Crawfoot and the Coati Mundi	
September 26, 1971	Hacksaw	
October 31, 1971	The Strange Monster of Strawberry Cove	
November 28, 1971	Lefty, the Dingaling Lynx	
January 9, 1972	Mountain Born	
February 6, 1972	Justin Morgan Had a Horse	
February 20, 1972	The City Fox	
March 26, 1972	Michael O'Hara the Fourth	
October 22, 1972	The High Flying Spy	
November 26, 1972	Chandar, the Black Leopard of Ceylon	
January 1, 1973	The Mystery in Dracula's Castle	
March 4, 1973	Chester, Yesterday's Horse	
March 18, 1973	The Boy and the Bronc Buster	
April 1, 1973	Call It Courage	
September 30, 1973	Fire on Kelly Mountain	
October 7, 1973	Mustang	
January 6, 1974	The Whiz Kid and the Mystery at Riverton	
January 20, 1974	Hogwild	
March 10, 1974	Diamonds on Wheels	
October 6, 1974	Return of the Big Cat	
October 20, 1974	Two Against the Arctic	
November 3, 1974	Adventure in Satan’s Canyon	
December 1, 1974	Runaway on the Rogue River	
December 8, 1974	Stub: The Best Cowdog in the West	
January 19, 1975	The Sky's The Limit	
March 9, 1975	The Footloose Goose	
September 14, 1975	The Boy Who Talked to Badgers	
October 5, 1975	Secret of the Pond	
January 4, 1976	Twister, Bull from the Sky	
January 11, 1976	The Whiz Kid and the Carnival Caper	
February 29, 1976	The Survival of Sam the Pelican	
March 14, 1976	The Flight of the Grey Wolf	
October 31, 1976	The Secret of Old Glory Mine	
January 2, 1977	The Golden Dog	
January 9, 1977	Kit Carson and the Mountain Men	
January 30, 1977	Barry of the Great St. Bernard	
February 1, 1977	The Mystery of Rustler's Cave	Aired exclusively on The New Mickey Mouse Club
March 13, 1977	The Ghost of Cypress Swamp	
April 3, 1977	The Track of the African Bongo	
May 22, 1977	The Bluegrass Special	
January 8, 1978	Three on the Run	
February 5, 1978	Trail of Danger	
March 12, 1978	The Million Dollar Dixie Deliverance	
May 14, 1978	Child of Glass	
May 28, 1978	The Young Runaways	
January 7, 1979	Donovan's Kid	
January 28, 1979	Shadow of Fear	
February 11, 1979	Ride a Wild Pony AKA Harness Fever	
March 18, 1979	The Omega Connection AKA The London Connection	
March 25, 1979	Born to Run	
May 13, 1979	The Sky Trap	

== 1980s ==
Date	Movie	Notes
March 9, 1980	The Kids Who Knew Too Much	
April 20, 1980	Sultan and the Rock Star AKA The Hunter and the Rock Star	Episode of Walt Disney anthology series
April 27, 1980	The Secret of Lost Valley	
December 21, 1980	The Ghosts of Buxley Hall	
November 28, 1981	The Cherokee Trail	
January 16, 1982	Tales of the Apple Dumpling Gang	
February 20, 1982	Beyond Witch Mountain	1st episode of the 1st season of "Walt Disney"
April 10, 1982	The Adventures of Pollyanna	
October 9, 1983	Tiger Town	First made-for-Disney Channel movie
May 6, 1984	Gone Are the Dayes	
October 7, 1984	Love Leads the Way: A True Story	
January 6, 1985	Black Arrow	
February 3, 1985	Lots of Luck	
May 5, 1985	The Undergrads	
August 2, 1985	The Caldercott Story	
November 17, 1985	The Blue Yonder	
February 2, 1986	Help Wanted: Kids	The Disney Sunday Movie
February 23, 1986	The Girl Who Spelled Freedom	The Disney Sunday Movie
March 9, 1986	The Richest Cat in the World	The Disney Sunday Movie
April 5, 1986	Return to Treasure Island	Miniseries
April 6, 1986	I-Man	
April 13, 1986	A Fighting Choice	The Disney Sunday Movie
April 20, 1986	Mr. Boogedy	The Disney Sunday Movie
May 11, 1986	Young Again	The Disney Sunday Movie
May 18, 1986	The Deacon Street Deer	The Disney Sunday Movie
May 19, 1986	Fuzzbucket	
May 25, 1986	My Town	The Disney Sunday Movie
July 26, 1986	The Parent Trap II	
September 28, 1986	Hero in the Family	
October 5, 1986	Little Spies	
October 18, 1986	Spot Marks the X	The Disney Sunday Movie
October 26, 1986	The B.R.A.T. Patrol	
November 2, 1986	Ask Max	
November 15, 1986	Down the Long Hills	
November 16, 1986	The Leftovers	
November 23, 1986	The Thanksgiving Promise AKA A Promise Made	
November 27, 1986	Fluppy Dogs	
November 30, 1986	Sunday Drive	The Disney Sunday Movie
December 14, 1986	The Christmas Star	
January 25, 1987	Double Switch	
February 1, 1987	You Ruined My Life	
February 8, 1987	The Liberators	
February 28, 1987	Strange Companions	
March 8, 1987	Bigfoot	
March 15, 1987	Young Harry Houdini	
March 27, 1987	U.S. Marshals: Waco & Rhinehart AKA Line of Duty	
March 29, 1987	Double Agent	
April 12, 1987	Bride of Boogedy	
May 19, 1987	Anne of Green Gables: The Sequel	
June 19, 1987	Not Quite Human	
November 1, 1987	The Return of the Shaggy Dog	
November 29, 1987	Student Exchange	
December 5, 1987	The Christmas Visitor	
January 17, 1988	Earth*Star Voyager	
February 7, 1988	Rock 'n' Roll Mom	
February 25, 1988	Totally Minnie	
March 6, 1988	14 Going on 30	
March 19, 1988	Save the Dog!	
May 1, 1988	Splash, Too	
May 15, 1988	Justin Case	
May 22, 1988	Meet the Munceys	
June 5, 1988	The Night Train to Kathmandu	
August 6, 1988	Ollie Hopnoodle's Haven of Bliss	
August 27, 1988	A Friendship in Vienna	
November 11, 1988	Good Old Boy	
November 20, 1988	Davy Crockett: Rainbow in the Thunder	
November 27, 1988	The Absent-Minded Professor	
December 3, 1988	Goodbye, Miss 4th of July	
December 18, 1988	Davy Crockett: A Natural Man	
January 13, 1989	Davy Crockett: Guardian Spirit	
January 15, 1989	Wild Jack	
February 26, 1989	The Absent-Minded Professor: Trading Places	
March 26, 1989	Super DuckTales	Episode
April 9, 1989	Parent Trap III	
April 29, 1989	Roald Dahl's Danny the Champion of the World	
April 30, 1989	The Disney-MGM Studios Theme Park Grand Opening	
June 11, 1989	Davy Crockett: A Letter To Polly	
June 18, 1989	Davy Crockett: Warrior's Farewell	
July 24, 1989	Great Expectations	Miniseries
September 18, 1989	Brand New Life: The Honeymooners	Episode
September 23, 1989	Not Quite Human II	
September 30, 1989	Chip 'n Dale's Rescue Rangers to the Rescue	
November 12, 1989	Polly	
November 19, 1989	Parent Trap: Hawaiian Honeymoon	
December 2, 1989	Spooner	
December 3, 1989	A Mother's Courage: The Mary Thomas Story	
December 15, 1989	The Wolves of Willoughby Chase	

== 1990s ==
Date	Movie	Notes
January 14, 1990	Exile	
January 27, 1990	Lantern Hill	
March 11, 1990	Sky High	
March 24, 1990	Chips, the War Dog	
April 9, 1990	Just Perfect	
May 19, 1990	Mother Goose Rock 'n' Rhyme	
June 7, 1990	Back Home	
August 17, 1990	The Little Kidnappers	
September 7, 1990	TaleSpin: Plunder & Lightning	Pilot of the television series TaleSpin (1990-1991)
October 21, 1990	Back to Hannibal: The Return of Tom Sawyer and Huckleberry Finn	
November 18, 1990	Polly: Comin' Home!	Sequel to Polly (1989)
December 17, 1990	A Mom for Christmas	
January 20, 1991	Bejewelled	
March 31, 1991	The 100 Lives of Black Jack Savage	Miniseries
March 31, 1991	Perfect Harmony	
April 15, 1991	She Stood Alone	
November 22, 1991	Mark Twain and Me	
December 16, 1991	In the Nick of Time	
May 3, 1992	Day-O	
May 31, 1992	Still Not Quite Human	Third film in the Not Quite Human series
January 17, 1993	The Ernest Green Story	
March 7, 1993	Spies	
April 6, 1993	Miracle Child	
July 18, 1993	Heidi	Miniseries
January 24, 1994	To My Daughter with Love	
March 6, 1994	One More Mountain	
April 17, 1994	On Promised Land	
July 31, 1994	The Whipping Boy	
November 12, 1994	The Shaggy Dog	Remake of the 1959 film of the same title
February 18, 1995	The Computer Wore Tennis Shoes	Remake of the 1969 film of the same title
March 19, 1995	The Old Curiosity Shop	
April 29, 1995	Escape to Witch Mountain	Remake of the 1959 film of the same title
May 6, 1995	Freaky Friday	Remake of the 1976 film of the same title
August 12, 1995	The Four Diamonds	
November 11, 1995	The Barefoot Executive	Remake of the 1971 film of the same title
March 24, 1996	The Little Riders	
April 20, 1996	Encino Woman	Sequel to Encino Man (1992)
June 1, 1996	Nightjohn	
August 1, 1996	Susie Q	
November 4, 1996	Just Like Dad	
November 12, 1996	Wish Upon a Star	
December 22, 1996	The Christmas Tree	
February 25, 1997	The Paper Brigade	
March 23, 1997	Out of Nowhere	
August 23, 1997	Northern Lights	
September 23, 1997	Steel Chariots	
October 5, 1997	Toothless	
October 25, 1997	Under Wraps	
October 26, 1997	Tower of Terror	First film overall based on a Disney Park attraction
November 2, 1997	Rodgers & Hammerstein's Cinderella	
November 9, 1997	Angels in the Endzone	Sequel to Angels in the Outfield (1994)
November 16, 1997	Oliver Twist	
November 30, 1997	The Love Bug	Semi-canon sequel and remake of the 1968 film of the same title
December 21, 1997	Flash	
January 4, 1998	Principal Takes a Holiday	
January 18, 1998	Ruby Bridges	
February 15, 1998	The Garbage Picking Field Goal Kicking Philadelphia Phenomenon	
March 8, 1998	Goldrush: A Real Life Alaskan Adventure	
March 15, 1998	Mr. Headmistress	
March 29, 1998	Safety Patrol	
April 5, 1998	Tourist Trap	
April 11, 1998	Beverly Hills Family Robinson	
April 19, 1998	My Date with the President's Daughter	
May 17, 1998	Miracle at Midnight	
June 27, 1998	You Lucky Dog	
August 29, 1998	Brink!	
October 4, 1998	Sabrina Goes to Rome	
October 11, 1998	Noah	
October 17, 1998	Halloweentown	
November 8, 1998	A Knight in Camelot	
December 13, 1998	Murder She Purred: A Mrs. Murphy Mystery	
January 10, 1999	The New Swiss Family Robinson	
January 17, 1999	Selma, Lord, Selma	
January 23, 1999	Zenon: Girl of the 21st Century	
January 24, 1999	A Saintly Switch	
February 14, 1999	Storm of the Century	Miniseries
March 28, 1999	Balloon Farm	
April 10, 1999	Can of Worms	
May 15, 1999	The Thirteenth Year	
June 26, 1999	Smart House	
July 24, 1999	Johnny Tsunami	
August 21, 1999	Genius	
September 26, 1999	Sabrina Down Under	
October 3, 1999	H-E Double Hockey Sticks	
October 9, 1999	Don't Look Under the Bed	
November 7, 1999	Annie	
November 20, 1999	Horse Sense	
December 12, 1999	Switching Goals	

== 2000s ==
Date	Movie	Notes
January 16, 2000	The Loretta Claiborne Story	
January 22, 2000	Up, Up and Away	co-production with Hartbreak Films, Inc.
February 5, 2000	The Color of Friendship	co-production with Alan Snacks Productions
March 5, 2000	Life-Size	
March 12, 2000	Model Behavior	co-production with Karz Entertainment and Pacific Motion Pictures
March 18, 2000	Alley Cats Strike	co-production with Rastar
April 2, 2000	Mail to the Chief	
April 9, 2000	Angels in the Infield	
April 22, 2000	Rip Girls	
May 7, 2000	Geppetto	
May 13, 2000	Miracle in Lane 2	
June 17, 2000	Stepsister from Planet Weird	
July 1, 2000	The Pooch and the Pauper	
July 14, 2000	Ready to Run	
August 8, 2000	Buzz Lightyear of Star Command: The Adventure Begins	
August 13, 2000	The New Adventures of Spin and Marty: Suspect Behavior	
August 18, 2000	Quints	
September 8, 2000	The Other Me	
October 13, 2000	Mom's Got a Date with a Vampire	
November 10, 2000	Phantom of the Megaplex	
November 12, 2000	The Miracle Worker	co-production with Fountain Productions
November 15, 2000	The Growing Pains Movie	
December 1, 2000	The Ultimate Christmas Present	
December 3, 2000	Santa Who?	co-production with De Passe Entertainment
January 12, 2001	Zenon: The Zequel	
February 16, 2001	Motocrossed	
March 9, 2001	The Luck of the Irish	
March 11, 2001	Princess of Thieves	
April 13, 2001	Hounded	
April 22, 2001	Ladies and the Champ	
May 13, 2001	Child Star: The Shirley Temple Story	
May 20, 2001	Anne Frank: The Whole Story	
June 8, 2001	Jett Jackson: The Movie	
July 13, 2001	The Jennie Project	
August 17, 2001	Jumping Ship	
September 14, 2001	The Poof Point	
October 12, 2001	Halloweentown II: Kalabar's Revenge	
November 18, 2001	The Facts of Life Reunion	
December 2, 2001	Brian's Song	
December 7, 2001	'Twas the Night	co-production with Adam Productions
January 18, 2002	Double Teamed	
March 8, 2002	Cadet Kelly	
March 10, 2002	Confessions of an Ugly Stepsister	
March 17, 2002	Snow White: The Fairest of Them All	
April 5, 2002	Tru Confessions	
May 12, 2002	Dinotopia	Miniseries
June 28, 2002	Get a Clue	
July 26, 2002	Gotta Kick It Up!	
August 23, 2002	A Ring of Endless Light	
October 4, 2002	The Scream Team	
November 3, 2002	Home Alone 4: Taking Back the House	
November 17, 2002	Mr. St. Nick	
December 15, 2002	Nancy Drew	
January 10, 2003	You Wish!	
January 19, 2003	Sounder	
February 16, 2003	The Music Man	
March 21, 2003	Right on Track	
April 27, 2003	Eloise at the Plaza	
June 13, 2003	The Even Stevens Movie	
July 18, 2003	Eddie's Million Dollar Cook-Off	
August 15, 2003	The Cheetah Girls	
November 1, 2003	Phenomenon II	
November 21, 2003	Full-Court Miracle	
November 22, 2003	Eloise at Christmastime	
November 28, 2003	Kim Possible: A Sitch in Time	
January 16, 2004	Pixel Perfect	
March 19, 2004	Going to the Mat	
May 10, 2004	A Wrinkle in Time	
June 11, 2004	Zenon: Z3	
July 16, 2004	Stuck in the Suburbs	
August 6, 2004	Tiger Cruise	co-production with Stu Segall Productions and First Street Flims
October 8, 2004	Halloweentown High	
October 16, 2004	Growing Pains: Return of the Seavers	
December 25, 2004	Naughty or Nice	
January 14, 2005	Now You See It...	
March 11, 2005	Buffalo Dreams	co-production with Cosgrove Meurer Productions
March 25, 2005	Little House on the Prairie	Miniseries
April 8, 2005	Kim Possible Movie: So the Drama	
April 27, 2005	The Muppets' Wizard of Oz	
June 10, 2005	Go Figure	
July 15, 2005	Life Is Ruff	
August 12, 2005	The Proud Family Movie	
August 23, 2005	Our Huge Adventure	co-production with Curious Pictures and The Baby Einstein Company
October 14, 2005	Twitches	
December 18, 2005	Once Upon a Mattress	
January 20, 2006	High School Musical	
March 24, 2006	Cow Belles	
June 16, 2006	Wendy Wu: Homecoming Warrior	
July 21, 2006	Read It and Weep	
August 25, 2006	The Cheetah Girls 2	
October 20, 2006	Return to Halloweentown	
January 12, 2007	Jump In!	co-production with Davis Entertainment and Hop, Skip and Jump Productions
June 8, 2007	Johnny Kapahala: Back on Board	
August 17, 2007	High School Musical 2	
October 12, 2007	Twitches Too	
January 25, 2008	Minutemen	
June 20, 2008	Camp Rock	
August 22, 2008	The Cheetah Girls: One World	
February 16, 2009	Dadnapped	
April 24, 2009	Hatching Pete	
June 26, 2009	Princess Protection Program	
August 28, 2009	Wizards of Waverly Place: The Movie	

== 2010s ==
Date	Movie	Notes
February 14, 2010	Starstruck	co-production with Close to Home Productions, LLC
March 19, 2010 (Canada) March 26, 2010 (USA)	Harriet the Spy: Blog Wars	co-production with 9 Story Entertainment
June 25, 2010 (USA) July 16, 2010 (Canada)	16 Wishes	co-production with Unity Pictures and Marvista Entertainment
August 13, 2010	Den Brother	co-production with Salty Pictures and Lion Share Productions
September 3, 2010	Camp Rock 2: The Final Jam	co-production with Coin Flip Productions and Alan Sacks Productions
November 12, 2010	Avalon High	co-production with Jaffe/Braunstein Entertainment and Ranger Productions
January 1, 2011	Feluda: The Kathmandu Caper	
March 25, 2011	The Suite Life Movie	co-production with Bad Angels Productions
April 15, 2011	Lemonade Mouth	co-production with Martin Chase Productions and G Wave Productions
May 22, 2011	Sharpay's Fabulous Adventure	
June 10, 2011	My Babysitter's a Vampire	
August 5, 2011	Phineas and Ferb the Movie: Across the 2nd Dimension	
November 11, 2011	Geek Charming	
December 2, 2011	Good Luck Charlie, It's Christmas!	
January 13, 2012	Frenemies	
February 17, 2012	Radio Rebel	
June 15, 2012	Let It Shine	
September 30, 2012	Luck Luck Ki Baat	
October 12, 2012	Girl vs. Monster	
November 18, 2012	Sofia the First: Once Upon a Princess	
July 19, 2013	Teen Beach Movie	
January 17, 2014	Cloud 9	
June 26, 2014	Zapped	
August 15, 2014	How to Build a Better Boy	
November 9, 2014	Pants on Fire	
February 13, 2015	Bad Hair Day	
June 26, 2015	Teen Beach 2	
July 31, 2015	Descendants	
October 9, 2015	Invisible Sister	
November 22, 2015	The Lion Guard: Return of the Roar	
November 23, 2015	Mark & Russell's Wild Ride	
June 24, 2016	Adventures in Babysitting	
July 3, 2016	Apna Bhai Gaju Bhai	
October 7, 2016	The Swap	
March 10, 2017	Tangled: Before Ever After	
July 21, 2017	Descendants 2	
February 16, 2018	Zombies	
August 10, 2018	Freaky Friday	
February 15, 2019	Kim Possible	
August 2, 2019	Descendants 3	

== 2020s ==
Date	Movie	Notes
February 14, 2020	Zombies 2	
July 31, 2020	Upside-Down Magic	
August 13, 2021	Spin	
October 1, 2021	Under Wraps	
December 3, 2021	Christmas...Again?!	
August 12, 2022	Zombies 3	
September 25, 2022	Under Wraps 2	
March 30, 2023	Prom Pact	
July 27, 2023	The Slumber Party	
July 10, 2025	Zombies 4: Dawn of the Vampires	

== See also ==
- List of Disney theatrical animated feature films
- Walt Disney Home Video (VHS)
- List of Disney feature-length home entertainment releases
- List of Disney Channel original films
- Walt Disney Records discography
- List of Disney television series
- Lists of Walt Disney Studios films
- Timeline of the Walt Disney Company
- List of programs broadcast by Disney Channel
