= Yom (TV series) =

- Promotional poster
- Created by: Munjal Shroff
- Developed by: Tilak Shetty; Munjal Shroff; Umesh Padalkar; Svani Parekh
- Written by: Svani Parekh, Sandiip Paatil
- Voices of: Sairaj; Devyani Davaonkar; Ketan Singh
- Theme music composer: Justin-Uday
- Opening theme: "Yom Theme" by Ajay Sawant
- Country of origin: India
- Original language: Hindi
- No. of seasons: 1
- No. of episodes: 26

Production
- Executive producer: Abhijeet Nadkarni
- Producers: Tilak Shetty; Munjal Shroff
- Running time: 21 minutes
- Production company: Graphiti Multimedia

Original release
- Network: Disney Channel India
- Release: 1 May – 30 October 2017

Yom (short for Yogendra Omprakash Mathur) is an Indian animated television series produced by Graphiti Multimedia and created by Munjal Shroff. It premiered on 1 May 2017 on Disney Channel in India. Originally set to air in 2016, but Disney delayed it to May 2017. The story is about Yogendra Mathur, often shortened to Yom, an 11-year-old school boy who lives in Chotasheher and can transform to different animals by performing yoga asanas.

The show was added to Netflix on 7 June 2018.

== Premise ==
Yogendra Mathur (Yom) is an 11-year-old schoolboy who has the power to transform into different animals such as an eagle, cat or dog; among others via Yoga Asanas. despite this he can only stay in animal form for 11 minutes at a time. He lives in the fictional city of Chotasheher and the show revolves around him saving it from various evil threats. another character is his friend Riya whose job it is to tell Yom how much time he has left in animal form
