= Vishal Malhotra =

Indian Actor and Presenter

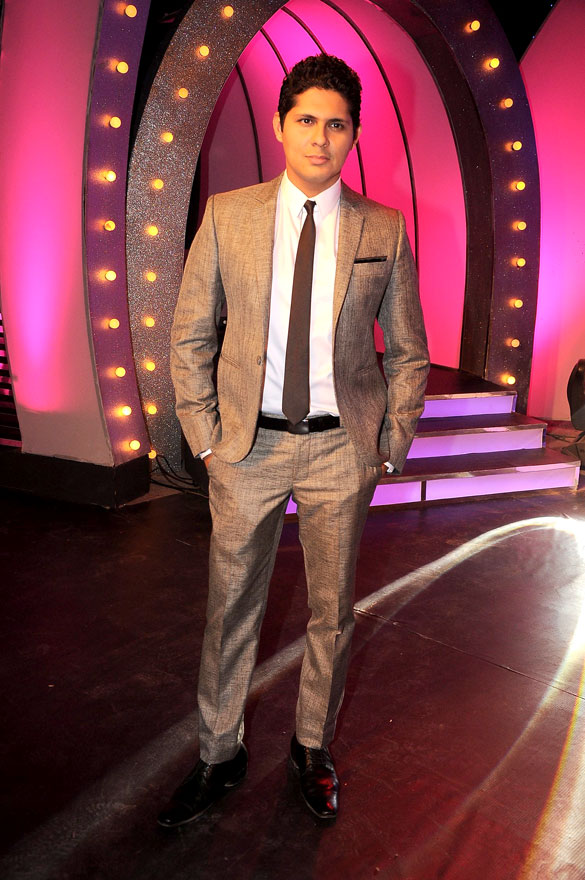
- Born: Mumbai, Maharashtra, India
- Occupations: Actor; anchorman
- Years active: 1995–present

Vishal Malhotra is an Indian film and television actor and a show host. Malhotra was first seen hosting Disney Hour in 1995, and as a teenager in Hip Hip Hurray in 1998. He also hosted Disney Time on Sony Entertainment Television in 2004. He is also the part of Disney channel's serial named Vicky & Vetaal, in which he plays the role of Vetaal.

He made his film debut with Ken Ghosh's Ishq Vishk and went on to act in films like Salaam-E-Ishq, Kaal, Dor, Kismat Konnection and Naqaab. He also hosted Entertainment Ke Liye Kuch Bhi Karega which premiered in 2009 with Mona Singh. He played the role of Maaya Manther (jaadu tonic) in Kya Mast Hai Life 2. He also had a cameo in Shararat. He played the role of Dr. Ranganath, assistant administrator of Dr. Kotnis General Hospital in Sony Entertainment Television's serial Kuch Toh Log Kahenge. Besides this, he was the brand ambassador of Harpic, replacing Hussain Kuwajerwala since 2013.

== Filmography ==
=== Movies ===
Year	Title	Role	Notes
2003	Ishq Vishk	Mambo	Debut film
2005	Kaal	Vishal	
2006	Dor		
2007	Salaam-E-Ishq	Juggy	
2007	Naqaab	Ronnie Chaturvedi	
2008	Jannat	Vishal	
2008	Kismat Konnection	Hiten Patel	
2008	Ugly Aur Pagli	Raj	
2008	Ek Vivaah... Aisa Bhi	Anuj B. Shrivastava	
2010	Toh Baat Pakki!	Vishal Saxena	
2010	Jaane Kahan Se Aayi Hai	Kaushal Milan Tiwari	
2010	Anjaana Anjaani	Aakash's friend	
2012	Talaash		
2014	Happy New Year	Host of World Dance Championship (Mumbai auditions & finale)	
2017	Tu Hai Mera Sunday	Dominic	

=== Television ===
Year	Title	Role	Notes
1995	Disney Hour	Host	Debut TV show
1998	Hip Hip Hurray	John	
1999	Rishtey - The Love Stories	Roy	Episode number: 91
2000	Rishtey - The Love Stories	Bunny	Episode number: 120
2003–06	Shararat	Ranjha	
2004	Ulta Pulta Ek Minute	Host	
2004–07	The Great Indian Comedy Show	Various roles	
2005	LOC - Life Out of Control	Virendra Malik	
2006	Vicky & Vetaal (Season 1)	Vetaal	
2007	Dhoom Machaao Dhoom	RJ of Kajal's father's radio station	
2009	Entertainment Ke Liye Kuch Bhi Karega (Season 1)	Host	
2009	Perfect Bride	Host	
2010	Kya Mast Hai Life (Season 2)	Maya Mantar	
2011–2013	Kuch Toh Log Kahenge	Dr. Ranganath	
2013	Adaalat	RJ Swaroop	2 episodes
2013	Har Yug Mein Aayega Ek Arjun	Charlie	Episode number: 110
2014	India's Best Cinestars Ki Khoj	Host	
2016	Humko Tumse Ho Gaya Hai Pyaar Kya Kare	Pulkit Mallick	
2016	Khatmal E Ishq	Kapil Dev Dinkar	
2018	Chandragupta Maurya	Seleucus I Nikator	
2022–2023	Katha Ankahee	Yuvraj Garewal	
2025	Zyada Mat Udd	Ranjeet Arora	
2026	Jaane Anjaane Hum Mile	Andy	

== Dubbing roles ==
=== Live action films ===
Film title	Actor(s)	Character	Dub Language	Original Language	Original Year Release	Dub Year Release	Notes
Pirates of the Caribbean: Dead Men Tell No Tales	Brenton Thwaites	Henry Turner	Hindi	English	2017	2017	

=== Animated films ===
Film title	Original Voice(s)	Character	Dub Language	Original Language	Original Year Release	Dub Year Release	Notes
Bolt	John Travolta	Bolt	Hindi	English	2008	2008	
Toy Story 3	Michael Keaton	Ken	Hindi	English	2010	2010	
