= Mai Ka Lal =

- Genre: Game Show
- Presented by: Javed Jaffrey
- Country of origin: India
- Original language: Hindi
- No. of seasons: 1

Production
- Production companies: SOL Productions; The Walt Disney Company India

Original release
- Network: The Disney Channel
- Release: 12 June 2011 – 2 January 2012

Mai Ka Lal is a game show on Disney Channel India which ran from 2011 to 2012. It premiered on 12 June 2011 and was hosted by actor and comedian Javed Jaffrey.

== Format ==
In each episode of Mai Ka Laal, three teams composed of children and their parents compete; parents are quizzed about their children. Starting with ‘Keeda No 1’, the five rounds are ‘Paana Hai to Khaana Hai’, ‘Bol Pol Ke khol’, ‘Act Do Teen’, ‘Dance Pe Chance’, Rapid Fire with Mummy or Daddy and ‘Sazaa Ya Mazaa’.

The winning family gets a holiday at Disneyland; all participating families win Disney merchandise.
