= Gaju Bhai =

Indian animated television series

- Also known as: Gajju Bhai
- Genre: Action; Adventure; Comedy
- Written by: Sandiip Paatil; Aarsh Vora
- Music by: Abhijeet Hegdepatil
- Country of origin: India
- Original language: Hindi
- No. of seasons: 2
- No. of episodes: 26 (52 segments)

Production
- Running time: 22 minutes
- Production companies: Toonz Animation; The Walt Disney Company India

Original release
- Network: Disney Channel
- Release: April 18, 2016 – March 24, 2018

Gaju Bhai is an Indian animated television series produced by Toonz Animation that aired on Disney Channel India. The series premiered on 18 April 2016.

Gaju Bhai typically follows a format of two 11-minute-long independent "segments" per episode. The show showcases the story of a Jollywood superstar Gaju Bhai and his transformation from a reel life hero to a real life hero.

== Characters ==
=== Main ===
- Gaju Bhai (voiced by Damandeep Singh Baggan): Gaju Bhai is the title character of the show. He's a Jollywood superstar. He shares a strong bond of friendship with Iravan. He is an elephant.
- Iravan: Iravan is a 10-year-old prince of Gajrajpuri. He is also an elephant.
- Bhagat: Bhagat is the commander of Gajrajpuri's army. He's a strict disciplinarian and often comes off as heartless and insensitive. He is a tiger.
- Mahaguru: Mahaguru is always sitting in a cave and meditating. He existed since the beginning of time. He is a hawk.

=== Recurring ===
- Miss Zuzee: Miss Zuzee is a cat and a journalist who devoted her life to find out the mysteries of Gaju Bhai's life. She wanted to be an actress.
- Shantilal: Shantilal is a crow and Gaju Bhai's manager, butler, make-up man, and secretary. He is always busy with his multiple mobile phones. He thinks and tells others that he's the one who made Gaju Bhai the superstar he is today, but only when Gaju Bhai is not around.
- Director: Director is a stereotypical Bollywood director who thinks his superstar is perfect. He always sees faults in others but never in his superstar. He is a monkey.

== Reception ==
It was featured in the 10th Krackjack Karnival.

=== Accolades ===
Gaju Bhai won FICCI's Best Animated Frames: Character of the Year and MAAC 24FPS awards in 2017.

Year	Award	Category	Result	Ref.
2017	Best Animated Frames Award	New Character of the Year	Won	
2017	MAAC 24FPS	Best Animation TV Series	Won	

== Film ==
A television film Apna Bhai Gaju Bhai based on the series aired on 3 July 2016.

== See also ==
- List of Disney Channel (India) series
- List of Indian animated television series
