= Let 'Er Go Gallegher =

1928 silent film by Elmer Clifton

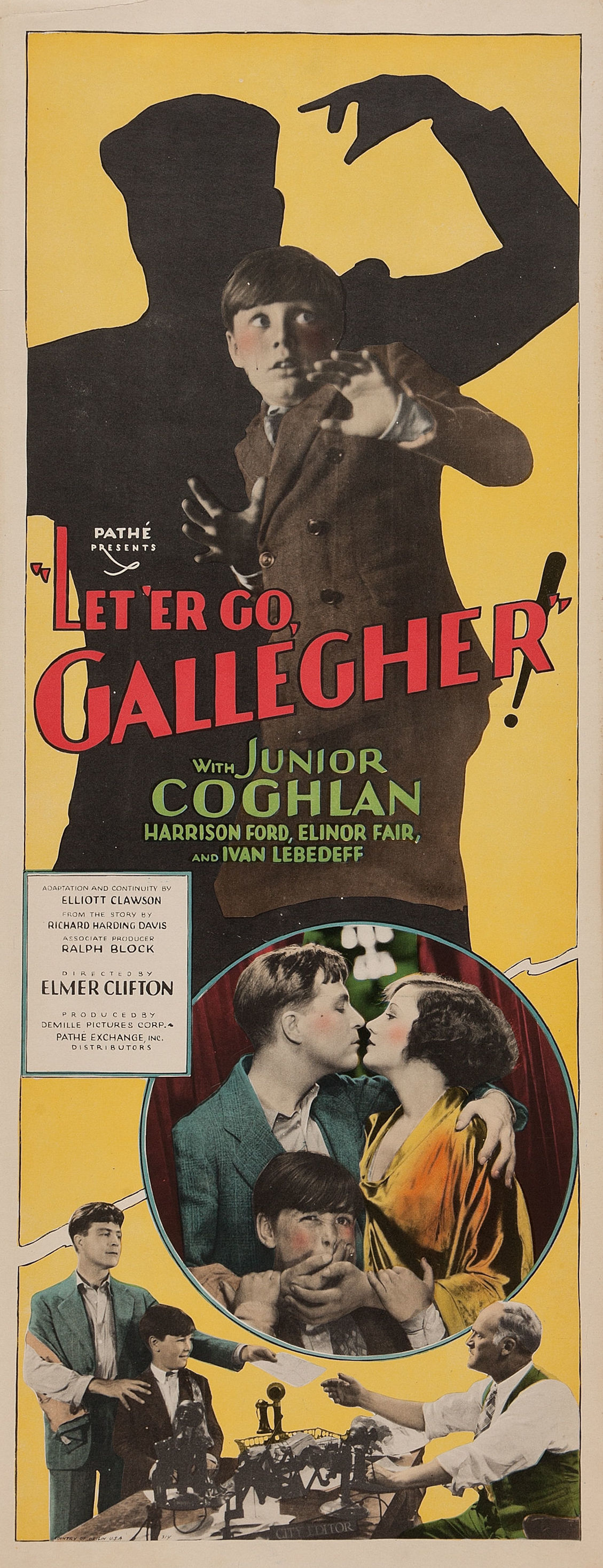
- Film poster
- Directed by: Elmer Clifton
- Written by: Elliott J. Clawson; John W. Krafft
- Produced by: Ralph Block; Cecil B. DeMille
- Starring: Frank Coghlan Jr. Harrison Ford; Elinor Fair
- Cinematography: Lucien N. Andriot
- Edited by: Harold McLernon
- Production company: DeMille Pictures Corporation
- Distributed by: Pathé Exchange
- Release date: January 15, 1928
- Running time: 60 minutes
- Country: United States
- Languages: Silent; English intertitles

Let 'Er Go Gallegher is a 1928 silent crime comedy film directed by Elmer Clifton and starring Frank Coghlan Jr., Harrison Ford and Elinor Fair. The film is based on the Gallegher character from American author Richard Harding Davis' 1891 publication Gallegher and Other Stories. The film's sets were designed by the art director Stephen Goosson.

In the story, Gallegher is a copy boy at a newspaper who becomes an investigator. The character was also adapted into a film in 1917.

The full movie.

== Cast ==
- Frank Coghlan Jr. as John 'Let 'Er Go' Gallegher
- Harrison Ford as Henry Clay Callahan
- Elinor Fair as Clarissa Mahaffey
- Wade Boteler as McGinty
- E.H. Calvert as City Editor
- Ivan Lebedeff as Stephen B. Hade AKA Four Fingers Dan
- Morgan Brown as Prohibition Officer

== Bibliography ==
- Connelly, Robert B. The Silents: Silent Feature Films, 1910-36, Volume 40, Issue 2. December Press, 1998.
- Munden, Kenneth White. The American Film Institute Catalog of Motion Pictures Produced in the United States, Part 1. University of California Press, 1997.
