= Palak Pe Jhalak =

- Created by: Michael Poryes; Susan Sherman
- Starring: Ayesha Kaduskar; Nitesh Pandey; Khyati Keswani; Arush Rana; Vaibhav Thakkar; Anam Anuji
- Opening theme: "Magic Hai Palak Pe"
- Country of origin: India
- Original language: Hindi
- No. of seasons: 1
- No. of episodes: 21

Production
- Running time: approx. 22 minutes
- Production company: Rose Audio Visuals Pvt. Ltd.

Original release
- Network: Disney Channel
- Release: 27 September – 9 December 2015

Palak Pe Jhalak (translated to A Glimpse in the Eye) is an Indian supernatural teen sitcom television series which premiered on Disney Channel India. It is an adaptation of the American TV series That's So Raven. The series produced by Rose Audio Visuals premiered on 27 September 2015 and ended on 9 December 2015.

== Plot ==
The show is set in Delhi and revolves around teenager Nysha Kapoor (Ayesha Kaduskar), her friends, and her family members; mother (Khyati Keswani), father (Nitesh Pandey), brother (Arush Rana), and her best friends Ishaan (Vaibhav Thakkar) and Tara (Anam Anuji).

Nysha Kapoor, a teenage girl, receives psychic visions of future events (which she calls 'Palak Pe Jhalak') when in deep situations. Attempting to make or prevent these visions coming true frequently results in trouble and hilarious situations for herself, her family and her friends.

== Episodes ==
The Season 1 of Palak Pe Jhalak started airing on Disney channel India on with the episode "Mother Dearest" and ended in March, 2016 with the episode, "Crazy Sister".

No.	Title	Original release date
1	"Saturday Afternoon Fever"	4 October 2015
Nysha is assigned to spend quality time with her mother at the movies, even though she is also going on a date to the movies with a cute boy. Nysha tries to juggle both tasks with disastrous results.
2	"Mother Dearest"	11 October 2015
Nysha gets in trouble after she mouths off to a spiteful teacher, and the teacher demands a parent-teacher conference. After school, Nysha's parents reward her with a new tablet because of her responsibility. Nysha feels guilty, but does not tell her parents about what happened at school. Instead, she ends up dressing up in her mom's outfit and goes to the conference, which creates all sorts of chaos. Meanwhile, Ishaan is being bullied by a jock who takes over his locker.
3	"Nysha's Love is so Low Class!"	25 October 2015
Nysha gets a crush on his senior, Ayaan. But he turns out to be very dirty. Nysha's parents reach there and all becomes a "Siyappa".
4	"Bhatti Ki Chutti"	18 October 2015
Bhatti, the biggest chef of Delhi comes to Mr. Kapoor's Restaurant and because of Nysha, Bhatti gives bad review to her father's cooking. But when, Nysha, Tara and Ishaan get together, they help Mr. Kapoor out of this problem.
5	"Fight at the Opera"	2 November 2015
Nysha and Tara are both appearing in their school's Classical Arts Festival. However, they dispute over creative differences. Nysha wants to do an opera on credit cards while Tara is leaning toward problems with global warming, the during ensuing fight between Nysha and Tara. The two split up and it is now up to MC Ishaan to reconcile the lifelong friends.
6	"Party Animal"	2 November 2015
Nysha and her brother Rohan fight and tease each other regularly. But when Nysha has a vision of her brother getting mad at her, she attempts to reconcile by throwing him an animal themed birthday party. However, circumstances make the day much harder for Nysha, who has to save her relationship with Rohan...as well as her ambitious birthday plans.
7	"Dissin' Cousins"	9 November 2015
Nysha's rich and boastful cousin Jasleen aka Jazz comes to visit, leading to a major tiff between the two girls. However, with Tara and Ishaan's help, the two soon begin to reconcile, and Ishaan's dream comes true.
8	"Teach Your Children Well"	16 November 2015
Nysha is furious (and embarrassed) when her mom accepts a job teaching Hindi at her school. But when a ruthless note finds its way into Neeta's grasp, it is up to Nysha, Ishaan and Tara to save the note before Nysha gets in trouble.
9	"The Parties"	23 November 2015
Nysha is extremely excited when she is hosting her first proper party. But when Nysha's arch enemy, Tia, sabotages her plans and embarrasses Nysha in front of her entire school, Nysha, Tara and Ishaan take revenge. However, Nysha starts feeling guilty, so she doesn't send the video of Tia looking like a disaster to Tia's party. In the end, Nysha still gets revenge with poison ivy covered flowers.
10	"Wake up Kunal"	30 November 2015
Rohan and his friend Amir attempt to hypnotize Tara and Nysha. Instead, they hypnotise Kunal. However, Kunal was supposed to appear on a prestigious cooking show with impatient host Karishma aka K. Can Nysha and her family save her dad from utter failure before it's too late?
11	"To See or Not to See"	6 December 2015
Nysha's visions cause embarrassing moments for both Ishaan and Tara. She is miserable about her visions and being different from others. Instead, she finds solace in her Grandma Dolly, who has a secret to tell her.
12	"Bhaag Nysha Bhaag"	13 December 2015
Nysha sees a vision of a cart running into Hetal in the school hallway, so when the TV cart comes, Nysha pushes Hetal out of the way and accidentally into blue paint. When Hetal goes to the hair salon, Nysha goes there to apologize, but Nysha overhears Hetal saying she will get revenge on her. Nysha pretends to be a hairdresser, and when she's fixing one of Hetal's hairs, her chewing gum gets stuck to it. When Hetal finds out that Nysha has damaged her hair, Nysha runs out of the hair salon silently. Nysha tells Tara about fixing Hetal's hair. That night, Rohan and his friend Amir (who have chicken pox) agree to help Nysha the next day with technology, which helps her avoid Hetal at school.
13	"Escape Claus"	20 December 2015
In this special Christmas episode, Nysha opens her beautiful Christmas present early, but after wearing it at school, she breaks it. She must sacrifice all her favorite Christmas traditions to mend the trouble she caused, even if it means missing spending time with her family.
14	""Crazy Sister""	9 December 2015
Nysha falls in love with a boy, and sees a vision of the future where he confesses his love for her too. In the vision, they are at a festival. She asks the boy to come to the festival as well, hoping that the vision will come true. However, the boy arrives with his elder sister, who warns her to stay away from her brother. Disappointed, Nysha thinks of ways to spend time with the boy, but her sister keeps getting in the way of it.
