= Gabbar Poonchwala =

- Genre: Sitcom
- Directed by: Rajan Waghdhare
- Starring: Tunisha Sharma
- Country of origin: India
- Original language: Hindi
- No. of seasons: 1

Production
- Production company: Lost Boy Peoductions

Original release
- Network: Disney Channel India
- Release: 11 January – 4 April 2016

Gabbar Poonchwala is an Indian sitcom which premiered on Disney Channel India from 11 January 2016 to 4 April 2016. The story is about a dog, Gabbar, who can speak Haryanvi with the boy called Mihir who found him in the playground. It aired on 11 January 2016.

== Characters ==
- Akash Dhanija as Gabbar "Poonchwala" (Voice role)
- Nihar Gite as Mihir Khanna
- Sanjeev Rathore as Sunil Khanna, Father of Mihir
- Eva Shirali as Gauri Khanna, Mother of Mihir
- Sharad Joshi as Amar Khanna, Elder Brother of Mihir
- Pankaj Kansra as Dimple Aunty, Neighbour and mother of Sanya
- Tunisha Sharma as Sanya, Amar's Girlfriend & Dimple aunty's Daughter.)
- Hitesh Dave as Maharaj
- Ritesh M M Shukla as Bhola
