= Gallegher (character) =

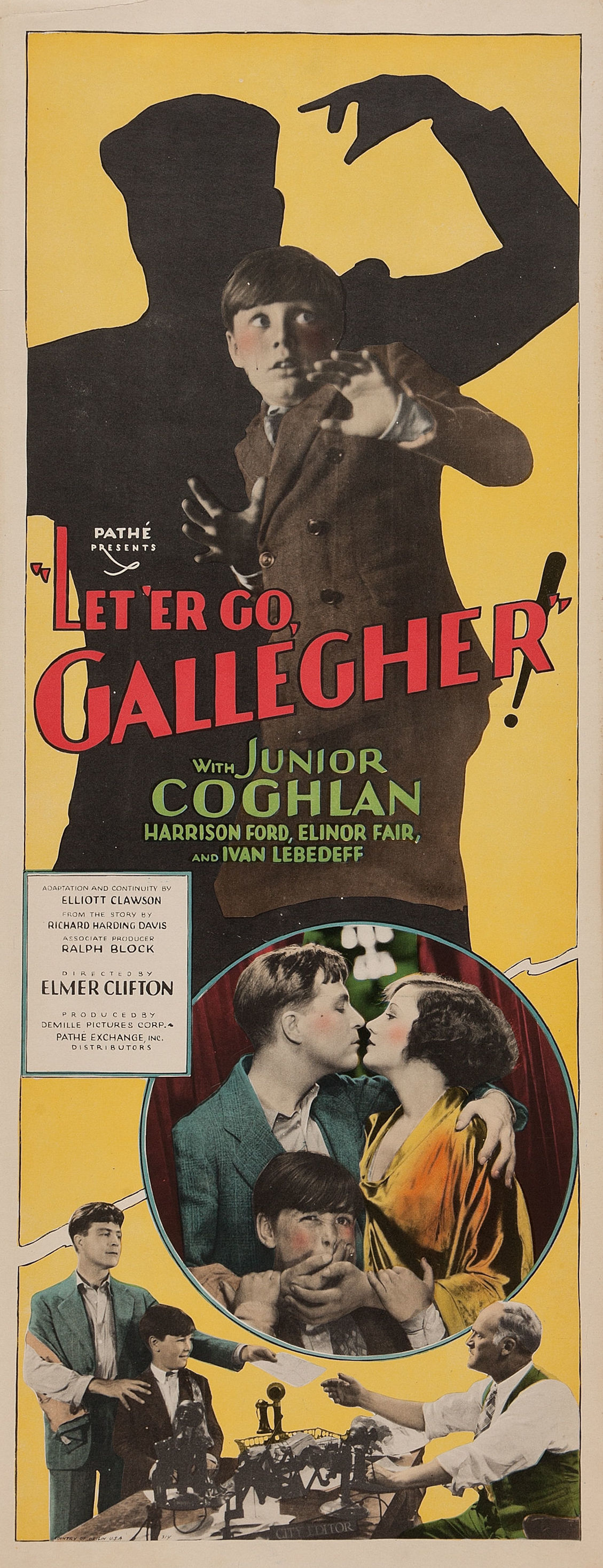
Poster for Let 'Er Go Gallegher

Gallegher is the title of a story by American author Richard Harding Davis that was published in 1891. The character Gallegher is a copy boy at a newspaper who goes on investigative adventures. In 1917, Thomas A. Edison, Inc.'s Conquest Pictures released a short film titled Gallegher: a newspaper story. The character was also used for the 1928 film Let 'Er Go Gallegher.

Walt Disney's Wonderful World of Color also produced several series based on the story from 1965 until 1968 including Gallegger (boy reporter), The Further Adventures of Gallegher, Gallegher Goes West, and The Mystery of Edward Sims.

== History ==
Davis, who worked as a journalist as well as a writer, published Gallegher and Other Stories with Scribner's in 1891. The book has a frontispiece and five illustrations by Charles Dana Gibson.

== Disney ==
The three Gallegher television episodes from Disney led to the three-part sequel The Further Adventures of Gallegher, the four-part Gallegher Goes West series, and the two episodes titled The Mystery of Edward Sims. The miniseries starred Harvey Korman, Jack Warden, Tom Skerritt, Peter Graves, Dennis Weaver, Bruce Dern, Larry D. Mann, and Warren Oates.

Gold Key Comics did a one-shot comic tie-in to the Disney episodes: Walt Disney's Gallegher, Boy Reporter in 1965.
