= Astra Force =

- Poster
- Genre: Superhero; Action; Adventure
- Created by: Amitabh Bachchan; Sharad Devrajan
- Written by: Alok Sharma, Swapnil Narendra, Aarsh Vora, Sandiip Paatil
- Country of origin: India
- Original language: Hindi
- No. of seasons: 2
- No. of episodes: 52

Production
- Running time: 22 minutes
- Production company: Graphic India

Original release
- Network: Disney Channel India
- Release: 27 November 2016 – 18 August 2017

Astra Force is an Indian animated superhero television series created by Amitabh Bachchan for Disney Channel. The series involves a superhero called Astra who is woken up from hibernation by two children, twins Neal and Tara, and they also become superheroes like him. Each episodes deals with action and adventure with these superheroes fighting aliens and other enemies.

Astra Force typically follows a format of two 11-minutes long independent "segments" per episode. The series is also available on Amazon Prime Video.

Indiagames Ltd. released Astra Force an official tie-in game for the series in 2017.

== See also ==
- List of Indian animated television series
