= Sandeep Karnik =

Indian police service officer

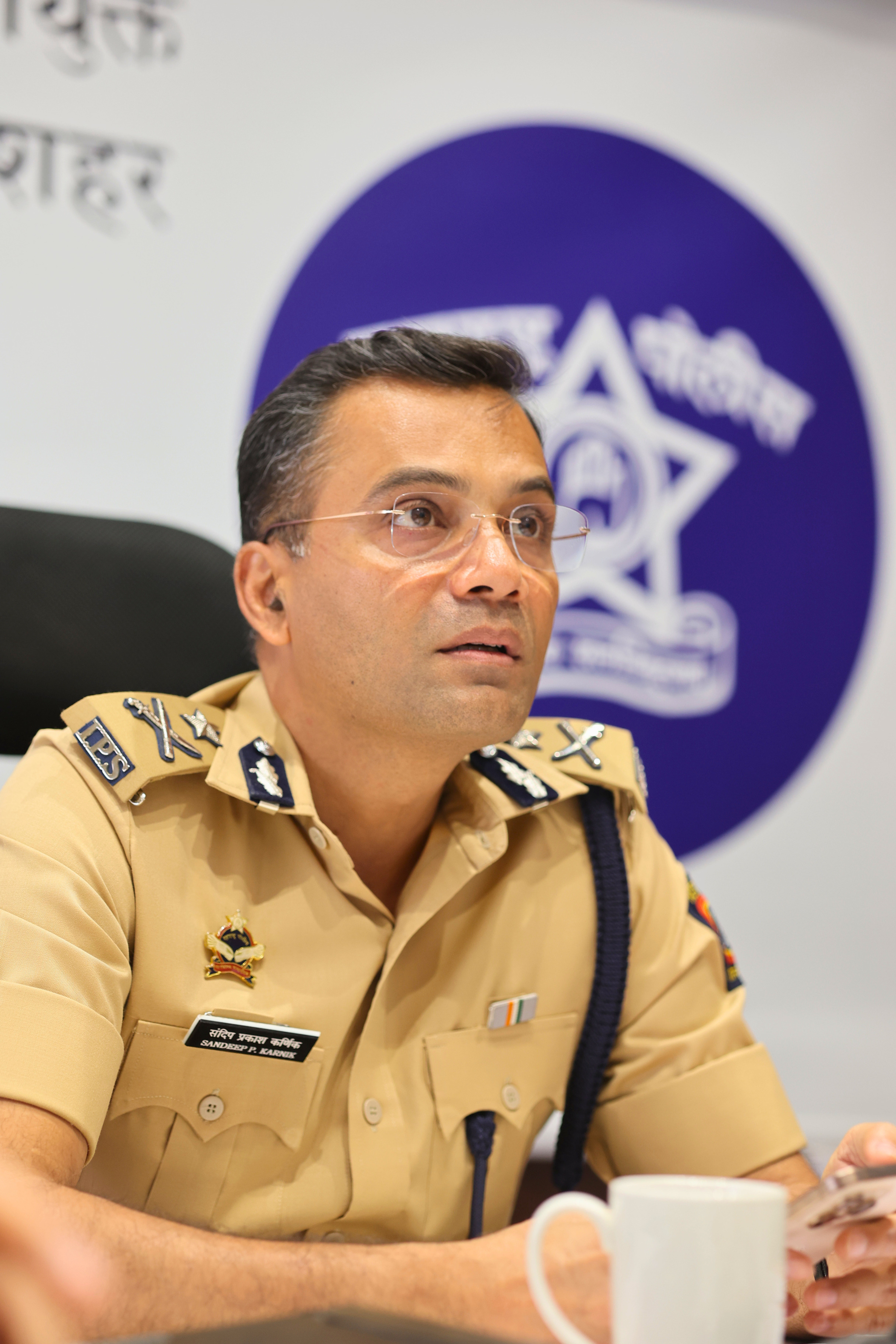

Commissioner of Police, Nashik City
- Incumbent
- Assumed office 24 November 2023

Joint Commissioner of Police, Pune
- In office 21 April 2022 – 22 November 2023

Additional Commissioner of Police, Mumbai
- In office 31 July 2018 – 21 April 2022

Personal details
- Born: 21 March 1975 (age 51)
- Education: B.E.; M.B.A.; MDPM
- Alma mater: Mumbai University, Pune University, Osmania University
- Police career
- Service: Indian Police Service
- Department: Maharashtra Police
- Service years: 2004–Present
- Rank: Special IGP

Sandeep Karnik is an Indian police service officer from the 2004 batch, currently serving as the Commissioner of Police Nashik. Appointed by the Maharashtra government, he took charge in November 2023. Sandeep Karnik also held the position of Joint Commissioner of Police in Pune, starting in April 2022. Before this, he served as the Superintendent of Pune Rural Police.

== Early life & education ==
Sandeep Karnik completed his Bachelor of Engineering (B.E.) in Electronics from University of Mumbai, an MBA in Marketing, and a Master’s in Police Management.

Currently serving as the Commissioner of Police, Nashik City, he assumed office in November 2023. He served in districts such as Ahmednagar, Thane, Nagpur, Jalna, and Nanded before being appointed as the Superintendent of Police for Pune Rural.

== Career ==
He has held several executive positions and has extensive experience in law enforcement. In his tenure as Nashik Police Commissioner, he gained recognition for his citizen-friendly initiatives and role in curbing drug-related activities.

In March 2024, the Maharashtra government appointed Karnik as the head of a Special Investigation Team (SIT) to probe the Maratha quota violence.

In October 2025, while serving as Nashik Police Commissioner, he initiated a policing operation called Nashik Jilla Kaydacha Ballekilla, meaning “Nashik District, Fortress of Law.” The operation used focused deterrence and hot-spot policing methods. Police identified criminal gangs, extortion groups, and offenders with political links, and took coordinated action against them.

== Notable cases ==
=== Ashok Kharat case ===
Karnik oversaw the police action in the case against Ashok Kharat, where women alleged sexual exploitation under the guise of spiritual and occult practices. Following complaints, the Nashik Police Crime Branch investigated, leading to a late-night arrest and multiple cases. A Maharashtra Government Special Investigation Team is now examining the complaints to ensure a coordinated probe into organized exploitation.

=== TCS Nashik workplace harassment case ===
In 2026, Karnik investigated a case involving allegations of sexual harassment, assault, and coercion at a business processing office of Tata Consultancy Services in Nashik. Multiple FIRs were registered and several accused, including team leaders, were arrested. An SIT was constituted by him to probe the matter, based on complaints from multiple women employees and supporting digital forensic evidences.

== Awards and recognition ==
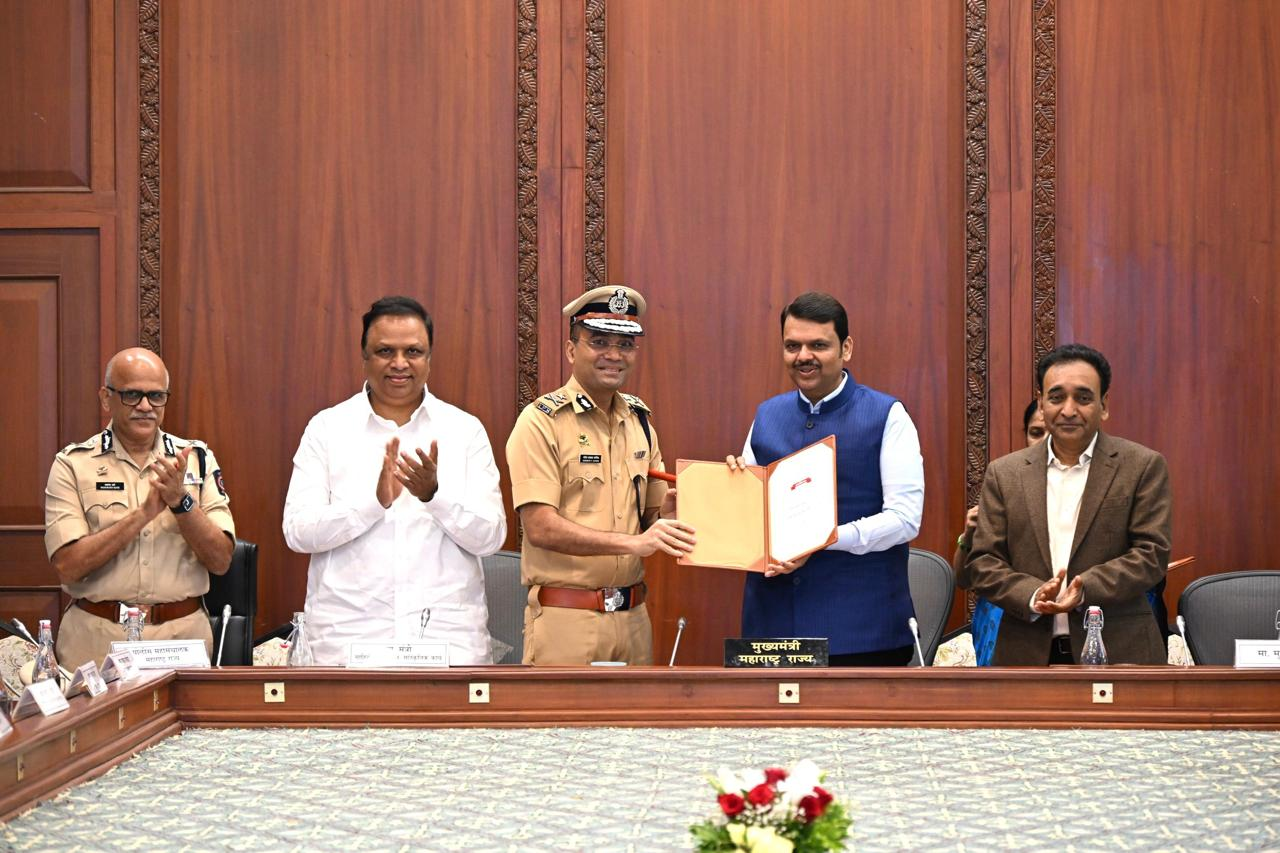
Under Karnik, the Nashik Police Commissionerate ranked first in Maharashtra in the Chief Minister’s 150-day e-governance programme (2026), receiving the award from Chief Minister Devendra Fadnavis

- First rank for the Nashik Police Commissionerate in the Chief Minister of Maharashtra’s 150-day e-governance programme (2026).

== Controversies ==
=== Maval firing incident ===
In August 2011, while serving as Superintendent of Police (Pune rural), a police firing incident occurred on the Mumbai-Pune Expressway (Maval). Following the incident in which four farmers died, allegations arose regarding the appropriateness of the use of force, with claims that the firing was unprovoked and not directed into the air. Within a month, the state government appointed judicial commission led by Justice M.G. Gaikwad. But the commission found no direct evidence linking him to any injuries and recommended administrative action only against certain officers for excessive response, which the State Government accepted. The Bombay High Court, while hearing petitions, too upheld this decision, confirming that due legal procedures were followed.

=== Nashik Dargah demolition drive incident ===
On April 16, 2025, violence broke out in Nashik during a demolition drive targeting the Satpeer Baba Dargah, declared illegal by the Bombay High Court. Clashes with police injured 21 officers. Despite the case being sub judice, the structure was demolished, prompting the Supreme Court to stay further action and demand an explanation. Karnik, as a Nashik Police Commissioner, noted intelligence about attempts to incite unrest prior to the incident, prompting preemptive police action. Subsequently, the Supreme Court of India allowed the Dargah Trust’s special leave petitions against the demolition notice to be withdrawn voluntarily.
