= Nach to the Groove =

- Country of origin: India
- Original language: Hindi

Production
- Running time: 23 minutes
- Production company: Sol (production company)

Original release
- Network: Disney Channel (India)
- Release: 2008

Nach to the Groove is an Indian television show that taught dance steps to the viewers.

Disney Channel launched 'Nach to the Groove' as an initiative to engage the tween audiences in dance and song. The kids channelroped in Kabir Arora to teach the audience 'How to Groove' on High School Musical and various Bollywood hits. Bollywood choreographer, Shiamak Davar set the mood for the groove at the start of each segment.

== Format ==
The show started with Shiamak Davar choosing songs from High School Musical series, or Bollywood, and the taking a sentence from that song and showing steps suitable for that song's paragraph. The kids on the set with Kabir Arora practised that steps and teaching it to the viewers also.
