= Break Time Masti Time =

- Created by: Abhimanyu Singh
- Country of origin: India
- Original language: Hindi
- No. of episodes: 40

Production
- Running time: 5–7 minutes
- Production company: Contiloe Entertainment

Original release
- Network: Disney Channel India
- Release: 6 October 2008 – 11 February 2009

Break Time Masti Time premiered on Disney Channel India on 6 October 2008. It is an Indian adaptation of the Disney Channel Italy original series Quelli dell'intervallo.

== Characters ==
- Devansh Doshi as Addy, the cool one
- Sagar Sawarkar as Rohan, the joker full of ideas
- Benazir Shaikh as Priyanka, best buddy
- Shivshakti Sachdev as Pari, drama queen diva
- Akash Bhatija as Dushyant, the foodie
- Tanvi Hegde as Delnaaz, chatterbox
- Rahul Joshi as Suraj, teachers' pet
- Umang Jain as Mahua, smarty pants
- Parth Muni as Swami, an intelligent geek

== Episodes ==
Season	Ep #	First airdate	Last airdate
Season 1	22	6 October 2008	11 November 2008
Season 2	18	3 January 2009	30 January 2009

== See also ==
- As the Bell Rings
