= Luck Luck Ki Baat =

- Based on: The Luck of the Irish by Paul Hoen
- Directed by: Iqbal Khan
- Starring: Satyajeet Dubey; Mahesh Thakur; Vandana Sajnani; Lilliput; Damandeep Singh Baggan
- Country of origin: India
- Original language: Hindi

Production
- Running time: 86 minutes
- Production company: SOL Productions

Original release
- Network: Disney Channel
- Release: 30 September 2012

Luck Luck Ki Baat is an Indian television film on Disney Channel India. It is a remake of the Disney Channel original movie The Luck of the Irish.

== Plot ==
The movie centers on a 16-year-old Amit who is a class hero and an incredibly lucky student who attributes all his luck to his special gold coin. In a bid to find out about his heritage, he visits a local fair styled around Arabian Nights where the mystery deepens as he encounters a series of mystical and sinister characters; amidst colourful stalls, Arabian dancers and magical tricks. By the next day his luck starts to wear thin as he enters the unknown yet familiar world of magic.

== Cast ==
- Satyajeet Dubey as Amit Kumar
- Mahesh Thakur as Kishore Kumar
- Vandana Sajnani as Leena Kumar
- Lilliput as Abul Jan
- Damandeep Singh Baggan as Ifrit Bula Bin Abdulla
- Kishan Savjani as Manpreet
- Ayesha as Kainaaz
- Maninee De as Mrs. Mukherjee
- Shubh as Shubham Mishra

== See also ==
- List of Disney Channel India Movies
- List of Disney television films
- List of Disney Channel (India) series
