= Super Hungama =

Indian pay television channel

- Logo used since 2022
- Country: India
- Broadcast area: India; Sri Lanka; Maldives; Bangladesh (until February 2013); Nepal; Bhutan

Programming
- Languages: English; Telugu; Tamil; Hindi
- Picture format: 576p SDTV

Ownership
- Owner: JioStar
- Sister channels: Hungama TV; JioStar Channels

History
- Launched: 17 December 2004; 21 years ago
- Former names: Toon Disney/Jetix (2004–2009); Disney XD (2009–2019); Marvel HQ (2019–2022)

Availability

Streaming media
- Airtel Digital TV India: SD

Super Hungama is an Indian pay television channel operated by JioStar, a joint venture between Disney India and Viacom18. It primarily focuses on animated children's series and is a direct sister channel to Hungama.

The channel was started as the Indian version of Toon Disney in December 2004 and also carried the Jetix block in India. Both brands were replaced by Disney XD on 14 November 2009. The channel became Marvel HQ on 20 January 2019 and Super Hungama on 1 March 2022.

== History ==
In December 2004, The Walt Disney Company launched two television channels in India—Disney Channel and Toon Disney—as a part of an effort to expand their presence in the South Asian market. Both channels broadcast in English, Hindi, Tamil, and Telugu. Toon Disney started with English, Tamil and Telugu and gained a Hindi-language audio track on 1 September 2005. Toon Disney carried the Jetix programming block in India. Among all children's television channels in India, Toon Disney had the lowest number of local programming. It was also one of the leading Indian children's channels at the time.

Disney XD replaced Toon Disney and Jetix in November 2009. In December 2011, Disney India planned to launch Marathi and Bengali language audio tracks for Disney XD in 2012 as a part of its regional expansion within the Indian subcontinent. The channel ceased to be available in Bangladesh in February 2013 as being an unapproved service; the move came as the government banned broadcasts of the Hindi-dubbed cartoon series Doraemon over fears that children would learn Hindi and not Bengali.

Marvel HQ replaced the Indian version of Disney XD on 20 January 2019. Disney India noted that Marvel was a "pop-culture phenomenon" worthy of a dedicated Marvel channel. The channel targeted children aged 6–17 with action-adventure animation and live action programming.

At launch, the main Marvel programming would consist of four animated shows and 40 percent of the total schedule, with additional Marvel animated series added or seasons started in March 2019. Over time, non-Marvel animated series were added, including Pokémon and Beyblade.

On 18 October 2021, Disney announced that Marvel HQ would be rebranded as Super Hungama on 1 December. On 30 November, one day before the intended launch, it was delayed until 1 March 2022 due to issues involving the implementation of the Telecom Regulatory Authority of India's New Tariff Order 2.0.

== Former logos ==
2004–2007

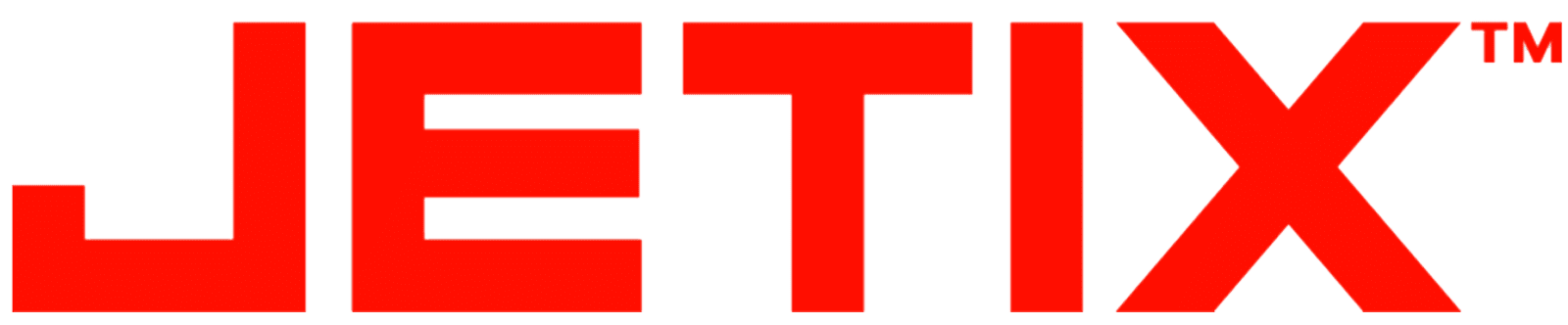
2007–2009

2009–2016

2016–2019

2019–2022

== See also ==
- Disney Junior
- List of Disney Channel (Indian TV channel) series
- List of programmes broadcast by Jetix India
- List of programmes broadcast by Fox Kids India
- List of programmes broadcast by Disney Channel (India)
- List of Indian animated television series
- List of programmes broadcast by Hungama TV
