= Disney India =

Indian regional subsidiary of the Walt Disney Company

The Walt Disney Company India
- Type: Subsidiary
- Industry: Media conglomerate
- Founded: 1 August 1993; 33 years ago
- Founders: The Walt Disney Company
- Headquarters: Mumbai, Maharashtra, India
- Area served: India
- Products: Films; television programs and channels; Television advertisements
- Services: Film distribution; Film promotion; Music recording; Music publishing; Over-the-top media services; Streaming media
- Parent: Disney Entertainment
- Divisions: Disney India Consumer Products; Disney India Interactive; JioStar (36.84%); Tata Play (30%)
- Website: disney.in

The Walt Disney Company India, also known as Disney India, is the Indian subsidiary of The Walt Disney Company, headquartered in Mumbai, Maharashtra.

In March 2019, The Walt Disney Company India became India's biggest television broadcaster after the acquisition of 21st Century Fox by Disney, which included Star India.

== History ==
=== Establishment ===
The Walt Disney Company India was initially established as a joint venture partnership between The Walt Disney Company and Modi Enterprises in August 1993 as a licensing agreement. Disney received approval in October 2001 from the Indian Foreign Investment Promotion Board to establish a fully owned subsidiary to launch the Disney Channel in India. Despite the approval for the subsidiary, its joint venture partner, Modi Enterprises, protested because of similarities to their joint venture. At the end of the 10-year licensing agreement in 2003, Modi Enterprises and Disney were unable to reach a new agreement, dissolving the joint venture in August 2003.

In September 2003, Walt Disney Television International Asia Pacific assumed control of the distribution of content through channels like Star Movies, AXN, and HBO, including 29 hours of children's programming weekly through channels such as DD Metro, Eenadu, SET, Star Plus and Star World.

=== Fully owned subsidiary ===
The Walt Disney Company (India) Private Limited began operations in July 2004 and is based in Mumbai. On 17 December 2004, Walt Disney Television International India launched the Disney Channel and Toon Disney Channel with five language feeds (English, Malayalam, Kannada, Telugu, and Tamil). The channels were to be distributed by the Star Group. In December 2004, with UTV Indiagames as a partner, Disney Interactive released Disney games, wallpapers, and ringtones available on Bharti Airtel. In 2005, Disney Consumer Products (DCP) began working with various Indian retail outlets to establish Disney Corners within the outlets to sell licensed merchandise. In August, Funskool India and Disney entered into a contract for Funskool to sell Disney Princess products in India.

In January 2007, Disney India and Yash Raj Films agreed to co-produce and co-finance a yearly animated film for the Indian market. Both companies work together on merchandising and games for the films.

In July 2006, Disney India acquired a controlling stake in Hungama TV from UTV Software Communications Limited while also taking a 14.9% share in UTV. In 2008, the company took an additional 17.5% stake in UTV.

On 26 September 2006, the Disney Jeans brand was launched under a licence to Indus Clothing, which planned to open 30 Disney Jeans stores by the end of 2007. In October, Disney Consumer Products (DCP) franchised the rights to set up 150 Disney Artist brand stores under the Disney Artist brand to Ravi Jaipuria Corporation for a period of 5 years. The stores were to sell greeting cards, stationery, arts, crafts, and party products in India, Nepal, Sri Lanka, Bangladesh, and the Maldives featuring Disney characters.

Disney Publishing Worldwide, a division of Walt Disney India, announced a licensing agreement in April 2009 with the local publisher Junior Diamond to publish Disney comics in English and Hindi. Jetix/Toon Disney was changed to Disney XD on 14 November 2009.

=== 2010s ===
In May 2011, Disney and UTV agreed to co-produce Disney-branded family films with creative functions handled jointly. UTV produces, markets, and distributes the films. In July 2011, Walt Disney Company (South East Asia) Pvt Ltd. offered to purchase public shareholders' stakes with the objective of increasing their ownership. In February 2012, Disney announced the completion of the acquisition of UTV. UTV Chief Executive Officer Ronnie Screwvala replaced Mahesh Samat as managing director of The Walt Disney Company (TWDC) India.

Disney launched Disney Junior, a channel for preschool kids. Disney India launched its live Entertainment operations in 2015 with the production of Beauty and the Beast, a musical to be shown from October to December in Mumbai and Delhi.

Disney India indicated in August 2016 that it was shutting down UTV Motion Pictures, its Hindi film production unit, and focusing on the distribution of its Hollywood films. Disney India managing director Siddharth Roy Kapur also indicated he would let his contract lapse on 1 January 2017. On 28 November 2016, Mahesh Samat was to return as managing director, four years after he left the company.

On 12 September 2017, Walt Disney International announced a restructuring of its business in Asia and that Mahesh Samat is to lead the new Disney South Asia division, combining India, Singapore, Malaysia, Thailand, Indonesia, the Philippines and Vietnam.

On 5 October 2017, The Walt Disney Company India officially announced the launch of Disney International HD to be on 29 October. The channel was to be the exclusive home to live-action Disney Channel original content. The channel will not have any animation content and will be replacing Bindass Play.

Disney launched its second HD channel, UTV HD, on 21 October 2018, showing Bollywood and Hollywood films in Hindi. It premiered a new movie every Friday.

On 7 November 2017, Disney announced the promotion of Abhishek Maheshwari as country head for India. He was to report to Mahesh Samat, Walt Disney International South Asia managing director.

On 14 December 2017, Disney announced its intent to acquire 21st Century Fox–parent company of rival Star India and streaming service Hotstar–for US$52.4 billion.

Consumers Products licensed DLF Brands for Disney & Me stores that opened in April 2018. The Live Entertainment division's second musical, Aladdin, premiered on 20 April 2018.

On 13 December 2018, Disney announced Uday Shankar, who serves as president of Fox Asia and chairman of Star India, would lead Disney's Asia Pacific region and chairman of Disney India after the acquisition of 21st Century Fox closes. On 1 April 2019, Uday Shankar, president of Disney Asia Pacific, announced the restructuring of the complete entity of Star India and Disney, while Sanjay Gupta would lead the Indian businesses and head Disney Studios India and Fox Star Studios in India, directly reporting to Uday Shankar who is also Chairman of Star and Disney India. Gupta resigned as country head in November 2019, while UTV channels were merged into the Star India bouquet.

Disney XD was replaced with Marvel HQ channel on 20 January 2019 at noon. Star India networks took over the distribution of Disney channels in July 2019. Disney Channel, Hungama TV, Marvel HQ, and Disney Junior became part of the Disney Kids Pack while Bindass and Disney International HD became part of the Star Value Pack. Later, in February 2020, Star Gold underwent a branding overhaul, while its sister channel Movies OK was replaced by Star Gold 2.

=== 2020s ===
On 30 December 2020, Disney announced that the Star branding would be replaced with Utsav from 1 February in the Netherlands.

On 26 January 2022, Tata Sky was rebranded into Tata Play.

Marvel HQ was replaced with the Super Hungama channel on 1 March 2022.

On 27 May 2022, Fox Star Studios was renamed Star Studios, as part of the removal of the "Fox" name from the studios that had been acquired from 21st Century Fox by Disney.

Following a restructuring paradigm, Disney announced plans to shut down the UTV brand, with UTV Movies, UTV HD, and UTV Action being replaced respectively by Star Gold Romance, the HD feed of Star Gold 2, and Star Gold Thrills.

In April 2023, Head of Network Entertainment Kevin Vaz left the company to join Viacom18 as CEO of TV Business.

In July 2023, The Walt Disney Company began exploring strategic options for their businesses in India, such as forming a joint venture or selling it completely; the company had major domestic cricket rights to competitors, which had weakened the Disney+ Hotstar service.

Between September and October 2023, Disney held preliminary talks with Reliance Industries, Adani Group, Sun Group, Blackstone, and Sony Pictures Networks India. In October 2023, it was reported that Disney was nearing a cash and stock deal with Reliance Industries for the sale of its operations in India, including a controlling stake in Disney Star. The assets Reliance will acquire are reportedly valued at around US$7–8 billion (valuing the entire division at US$10 billion), and a transaction could be announced as early as November.

Although the CEO of Disney, Robert Iger, refuted such claims at first, it was announced in December 2023 that Disney and Reliance had signed a non-binding term sheet for a merger. According to its terms, Reliance would hold a 51% in the merged company in cash and stock, while Disney would own the remaining 49%. For purposes of the merger, a subsidiary of Viacom18 will be created to absorb Disney Star through a stock swap. The deal is expected to be completed by February 2024, pending ratification and regulatory approval, although Reliance aims to complete it by the end of January.

In February 2024, The Walt Disney Company and Reliance Industries reached a deal to merge their streaming and television assets, with the joint venture valued at $8.5 billion, including synergies. As part of the deal, Viacom18 would be merged into Disney Star, with Disney holding a 36.84% stake in the combined entity. This would bring together assets such as linear television entertainment channels StarPlus, Colors TV, and the Star Gold Network; sports channels Star Sports and Sports18; and the streaming services JioCinema and Disney+ Hotstar. Nita Ambani will serve as the chairperson of the joint venture, while Uday Shankar will serve as vice chairperson. The deal gives 16.34% to Reliance and 46.82% to Viacom18 and is expected to close sometime in late 2024 or early 2025, pending regulatory approval. The deal was approved by the National Company Law Tribunal, with the JioCinema streaming service being moved to the Viacom18 unit as part of the merger.

== Divisions ==
=== Current divisions ===
Store	Licensee	Start date	Closed Date
Disney Corners Departments		April 2005	
Disney Jeans	Indus Clothing	26 September 2006	
Disney Artist	Ravi Jaipuria Corporation	10 October 2006	
Disney & Me	DLF Brands	April 2018	
shopDisney		23 November 2020	

- Tata Play (30%)
- JioStar (36.84%)
  - Disney Channel (India)
  - Disney Jr. (India)
  - Disney International HD
- Disney Consumer Products and Interactive Media
  - Disney Consumer Products
  - Disney Publishing Worldwide
  - Disney Interactive

=== Former divisions ===
- Walt Disney Pictures India
- UTV Software Communications
  - UTV Motion Pictures
  - UTV Indiagames
  - UTV Ignition Games
- Disney India Media Networks
- Asianet Star Communications
- Novi Digital Entertainment

==== Walt Disney Pictures India ====
Year	Film	Director	Producer(s)	Co-production Co.	Notes	Ref.
2008	Roadside Romeo	Jugal Hansraj	Aditya Chopra	Yash Raj Films; Walt Disney Pictures; Tata Elxsi	Animated Film; National Film Award for Best Animated Film; Nominated- Visual Effects Society Award for Outstanding Animation in an Animated Feature Motion Picture	
2010	Do Dooni Chaar	Habib Faisal	Arindam Chaudhuri	Planman Motion Pictures	National Film Award for Best Feature Film in Hindi	
2011	Feluda: The Kathmandu Caper	Tapaas Chakravarti		distribution only DQ Entertainment International	Animated TV Movie	
2011	Anaganaga O Dheerudu	Prakash Kovelamudi	Prasad Devineni; Prakash Kovelamudi	A Bellyful of Dreams Entertainment; Arka Media Works	Telugu film	
2011	Zokkomon	Satyajit Bhatkal				
2012	Arjun: The Warrior Prince	Arnab Chaudhuri	Ronnie Screwvala; Siddharth Roy Kapur	UTV Motion Pictures	Animated Film; Nominated – Grand Prix at 2013 Annecy International Animated Film Festival	
2012	Luck Luck Ki Baat	Iqbal Khan	Disney Channel India	SOL Productions	Television film Remake of 2001 Disney Channel original movie The Luck of the Irish	
2014	Khoobsurat	Shashanka Ghosh	Fawad Khan: Anil Kapoor; Rhea Kapoor; Siddharth Roy Kapur	UTV Motion Pictures; Anil Kapoor Film Company		
2015	ABCD 2	Remo D'Souza	Siddharth Roy Kapur	UTV Motion Pictures	Sequel to the 2013 film ABCD: Any Body Can Dance.	
2016	Dangal	Nitesh Tiwari	Aamir Khan; Kiran Rao; Siddharth Roy Kapur	Aamir Khan Productions; UTV Motion Pictures	Highest Grossing Indian film till date.	
2017	Jagga Jasoos	Anurag Basu	Anurag Basu; Ranbir Kapoor; Siddharth Roy Kapur	PictureShuru Entertainment; UTV Motion Pictures; Ishana Movies		

=== Home Entertainment ===
The following Indian films were released under the Walt Disney Studios Home Entertainment banner.

Home Entertainment Release date	Film	International Title	Original Theatrical Release date	Production Company	Notes	Ref.
12 January 2010	Taare Zameen Par	Like Stars on Earth	21 December 2007	Aamir Khan Productions and PVR Pictures		
26 July 2011	Anaganaga O Dheerudu	Once Upon a Warrior	14 January 2011	Disney India, A Bellyful of Dreams Entertainment, and Arka Media Works	Part of Disney World Cinema series	
26 July 2011	Do Dooni Chaar	Two Twos Are Four	8 October 2010	Disney India and Planman Motion Pictures	Part of Disney World Cinema series	
26 July 2011	Zokkomon	Zokkomon	22 April 2011	Disney India	Part of Disney World Cinema series	

=== Disney Live Entertainment ===
Musicals

- Beauty and the Beast (2015) The staff on the show include Vikranth Pawar (director), Leslee Lewis (music director), and Terence Lewis (choreography).
- Aladdin (2018) The musical is co-produced with Indian company BookMyShow.

== See also ==
- List of films released by UTV Motion Pictures
- List of Walt Disney Pictures films
