= Hungama TV =

Indian children's TV channel

- Logo used since 2005
- Type: Television Channel
- Country: India
- Broadcast area: India; Bangladesh; Maldives; Nepal
- Network: JioStar

Programming
- Languages: Hindi; Telugu; Tamil
- Picture format: 576p SDTV

Ownership
- Owner: JioStar
- Sister channels: Super Hungama; Disney Channel; Disney Junior

History
- Launched: 25 September 2004; 22 years ago (SD)

Availability

Streaming media
- Airtel digital TV India: SD
- Asianet Digital India: SD
- JioTV India: SD

Hungama TV is an Indian television channel aimed at children, mainly showcasing Japanese and Indian animated series. It was launched on 26 September 2004. It is wholly owned and operated by JioStar, a joint-venture between Viacom18 and Disney India. The channel primarily airs Japanese kids animation with some other children's television series in Hindi, Telugu, and Tamil.

== History ==
UTV and Ronnie Screwvala formed United Home Entertainment with 51% and 49% ownership interests, respectively. The company was formed to launch an Indian kids channel. It hired TAG for channel packaging. Chief Operating Officer Purnendu Bose was hired and was expected to hire 100 employees for the channel. Rs 100 crore was the expected initial investment with expectations of break even in three years. On 25 September 2004, Hungama TV started broadcasting as the first domestic kids channel in India.

In March, 2005, one of the UTV founders, Zarina Mehta became Hungama's head of programming. In early 2006, she was promoted to chief operating officer of the channel.

In July, 2006, Disney India acquired a controlling stake in Hungama TV from UTV Software Communications while also taking a 14.9% share in UTV. In 2006, Disney acquired Hungama TV from UTV.

The channel started with both live-action and animated programming but, following the success of Doraemon, gradually shifted its focus to solely animated programming. In 2013, Hungama started adding original Indian series as a part of a localisation strategy.

In October 2021, it was announced that the channel would gain an HD simulcast, alongside a sister network named Super Hungama, a rebranding of Marvel HQ. However on 30 November, the planned launch date of 11 December was then delayed to 1 March 2022. Hungama TV's sister, Super Hungama, was officially launched on 1 March 2022, replacing Marvel HQ.

== Controversy ==
A Hindi dub of the Shin Chan anime started airing on Hungama TV on 19 June 2006, and it gained up to 60% of the channel's market share. There were complaints from parents over the main character's behaviour and the attitudes exhibited towards elders on the show, both of which were seen as a negative influence on children. This resulted in the Ministry of Information and Broadcasting banning the show in 2008, and requiring the series to be censored when fans made several requests to have it brought back.
