= The Luck of the Irish (2001 film) =

2001 American made-for-TV movie

- Promotional poster
- Teleplay by: Andrew Price; Mark Edward Edens
- Story by: Andrew Price
- Directed by: Paul Hoen
- Starring: Ryan Merriman; Alexis Lopez; Timothy Omundson; Henry Gibson
- Music by: Christopher Brady
- Country of origin: United States
- Original language: English

Production
- Producer: Don Schain
- Cinematography: Robert Steadman
- Editor: Jim Oliver
- Running time: 86 minutes
- Production company: Just Singer Entertainment

Original release
- Network: Disney Channel
- Release: March 9, 2001

The Luck of the Irish is a 2001 American sports comedy-drama film released as a Disney Channel Original Movie. The film, starring Ryan Merriman, Alexis Lopez, Timothy Omundson, and Henry Gibson, contains elements of fantasy and sports film combined with Irish culture. Conceived as a Saint Patrick's Day film, it was first broadcast on Disney Channel on March 9, 2001.

== Plot ==
With his lucky gold coin on his side, 15-year-old Kyle Johnson gets everything in life, and is also the best basketball player on his team. Heritage Day is approaching and every time Kyle asks where his family came from, his parents Kate and Bob change the subject. He finds out that his dad changed his last name of Smith to Johnson, but does not know why.

One day, Kyle and his best friend Russell Halloway go to an Irish festival. There he sees coins just like his and wonders if he is Irish. When Kyle cannot stop step dancing during Seamus McTieran and the Saint of the Step's show, he gets knocked down.

The next morning, Kyle wakes up and notices something is different about him. At breakfast, his mother is acting differently, and she confirms that they are Irish. His trip to school is marked by bad luck, including losing his homework. The next day, Kyle notices more changes as he grows shorter and his hair turns red. In science class, a magnet attaches to his coin and he realizes that his lucky gold coin was stolen.

He rushes home to tell his parents and walks in to see that his mother has shrunk to one foot tall. She reveals to him that she is really a leprechaun, making him half leprechaun and half human. He tells them who he thinks stole the coin, and his mom says that it was his grandfather Reilly O'Reilly, founder of the Emerald Isle potato chip company. Kate and her father had a falling out over her having a "mixed marriage".

They all go to the factory to ask for the coin back. Kyle is kicked out by security, then sneaks in with the Young Achievers group from school. A girl from school named Bonnie Lopez asks why he is there and he tells her. They get chased by security and end up getting caught by his grandfather. Reilly says that he did not steal it and that it is their family's lucky coin. The youngest member of the family must have possession of it so all the leprechauns in the O'Reilly clan can pass as humans. Bonnie tells Kyle that his ears have changed and are now pointy. Reilly starts to grow a beard.

They figure out that Seamus must have stolen the coin at the fair, so they go chase him down. Kyle's grandfather tells him that Seamus is an evil leprechaun. On their way, they come across Russell, who joins them. After Seamus and his gang get away, they track down the gang's camper at the end of a rainbow.

While Seamus and his gang are distracted eating dinner, Kyle and Reilly sneak into the camper and find the coin. Sensing their presence, Seamus captures Reilly in a tornado with his true form's face on it. As Kyle starts to run out of the camper, Seamus appears in his human form having grabbed Reilly by the beard as his men have grabbed Russell. Seamus will only let him go if Kyle gives him the coin. Kyle wagers a bet to keep both. He bets on sports. The three of them, plus Russell and Seamus' men, magically end up in Ireland. Kyle and Russell have to compete against them in Gaelic sports. When they end up tying, Seamus refuses to free Reilly. Kyle risks his freedom and bets on Seamus in basketball without using his lucky coin.

They are then transported to the junior high state championship game. Only Kyle, his family, and his friends are aware that they are playing against Seamus and his friends. Russell scores the game winning shot, Reilly is set free, and Seamus must spend eternity as a leprechaun at the land of Kyle's father (within the shores of Lake Erie). Kyle realizes that he does not need luck. The movie ends at the school talent show with Kyle embracing his heritage by Irish dancing and singing "This Land Is Your Land" with Bonnie as everyone joins in.

== Cast ==
- Ryan Merriman as Kyle O'Reilly Johnson
- Alexis Lopez as Bonnie Lopez
- Timothy Omundson as Seamus McTiernan
- Henry Gibson as Reilly O'Reilly
- Paul Kiernan as Robert "Bob" Smith-Johnson
- Marita Geraghty as Kate O'Reilly Johnson
- Glenndon Chatman as Russell Halloway
- Thurl Bailey as Mr. Halloway
- Duane Stephens as Patrick
- Charles Halford as McDermot
- Marshall Hilliard as Eddie McGuire
- Stan Ellsworth as Basketball Coach

== Production ==
Parts of the movie were filmed at Lagoon in Farmington, Utah.

== Reception ==
The Luck of the Irish has been called the "strangest Disney Channel original movie ever". It was a relative television success The film received a very mixed retrospective review at the sports website SB Nation.

Ryan Coogler revealed in a panel for his 2025 horror Sinners that he found inspiration in The Luck of the Irish, having "watched it like crazy" growing up, and noticed similarities between Irish Culture and Black culture, and inspired the creation of the Irish-immigrant vampire Remmick.

== Release ==
It was first broadcast on Disney Channel on March 9, 2001, a week before Saint Patrick's Day.

== Remake ==
In 2012, The Luck of the Irish was remade into an Indian Hindi-language television film, Luck Luck Ki Baat, directed by Iqbal Khan, featuring Satyajeet Dubey and Mahesh Thakur in the lead roles.

== See also ==
- List of basketball films
