= Disney Jr. (India) =

Indian variant of Disney Jr.

- Logo used since 2025
- Type: Television Channel
- Country: India
- Broadcast area: India; Sri Lanka; Bangladesh (until February 2013); Nepal; Bhutan; Maldives
- Network: Jio Star

Programming
- Languages: English; Hindi; Telugu; Tamil
- Picture format: 576p SDTV

Ownership
- Owner: JioStar (branding licensed from Disney India)
- Sister channels: Disney Star Channels

History
- Launched: 2006; 20 years ago (as Playhouse Disney block); 4 July 2011; 15 years ago (block); 15 October 2012; 14 years ago (channel)
- Former names: Playhouse Disney (2006–2011); Disney Junior (2011-2025)

Links
- Website: disneyjunior.disney.in

Availability

Streaming media
- Airtel Digital TV India: SD & HD

Disney Jr. is an Indian pay television channel owned by JioStar, a joint venture between Viacom18 and Disney India. The channel is dedicated towards pre-schoolers. It is also available as a programming block on Disney Channel that replaced Playhouse Disney. The channel is the Indian equivalent to the original American network and broadcasts in English, Hindi, Telugu and Tamil.

== History ==
Before 2006, Playhouse Disney was launched in India as a block on Disney Channel. On 4 July 2011, it was replaced by Disney Junior. On 15 October 2012, Disney Junior launched as a channel.

== Logos ==
2019–2025

2025–present
