= Disney Channel (India) =

Indian pay TV channel targeted at children

- Logo used since May 2, 2026
- Country: India
- Broadcast area: India; Bhutan; Maldives; Nepal; Sri Lanka

Programming
- Languages: English (Only for HD feed); Hindi; Telugu; Tamil
- Picture format: 1080p HDTV

Ownership
- Owner: JioStar (branding licensed from Disney India)

History
- Launched: 16 December 2004; 21 years ago (SD); 15 March 2023; 3 years ago (HD)

Availability

Streaming media
- Airtel Digital TV: SD & HD

Disney Channel is an Indian pay television channel owned by JioStar, a joint venture between Viacom18 and Disney India. The channel is the Indian equivalent to the original American network, and was launched on 16 December 2004. Disney Channel is available as a pay television channel on most subscription television providers in Hindi, Telugu, and Tamil.

The channel became the fifth most watched kids channel across all genres with TRP as of October 2020.

== History ==
Disney Channel's former logo

On 16 December 2004, Disney Channel India and its sister channel Toon Disney launched in India, both broadcasting in English and Hindi. At first, the programming of the channel consisted of Disney's original shows imported from the US, such as Lizzie McGuire, That's So Raven, The Suite Life of Zack & Cody, Hannah Montana, Wizards of Waverly Place, Sonny with a Chance, The Suite Life on Deck, Jonas LA and Phineas and Ferb.

Disney India has produced local adaptations of international live action series. The first local adaptation, Best of Luck Nikki premiered on 3 April 2011. The Disney Channel Original Movie, Phineas and Ferb Across the 2nd Dimension premiered on the channel on 25 September 2011.

2012 saw the channel's second local adaptation, The Suite Life of Karan and Kabir premiering on 8 April, as well as the first Disney Channel India Original Movie, Luck Luck Ki Baat.

In June 2014, Disney Channel India launched their first local animated series, Arjun Prince of Bali.

The channel rebranded on 17 December 2014 with the new logo used internationally, with the exception of the logo colour being purple instead of blue, and had a strategy of showing family-oriented shows during the weekend. The weekend strategy was called "Shanivaar, Ravivaar only for Parivaar". The family shows started airing on 31 January 2015. In early 2016 the channel stopped producing local live action shows, and decided to focus on Japanese anime and local animation instead as animated/anime shows drive better ratings.

On 1 May 2018, the channel's logo color was changed to blue, as used internationally. On the same month the channel launched Simple Samosa and Big Hero 6 The Series. On 1 October 2018, the DuckTales reboot premiered in India.

In 2019 the channel continued to produce and acquire more local animation and international shows from the Disney library such as Oye Golu, Bhaagam Bhaag, Amphibia, Big City Greens, Miraculous: Tales of Ladybug and Cat Noir, Super V. The Descendants trilogy premiered on Disney Channel in December 2019.

In summer 2020, Disney Channel launched new shows such as Mira, Royal Detective, Bapu and Guddu, along with new episodes of shows like Chacha Chaudhary, Doraemon, and Selfie with Bajrangi. The channel launched a DIY show called Imagine That on 6 September 2020.

On 18 April 2021, the second season of Imagine That and 101 Dalmatian Street were aired.

After the merger of Disney Star and Viacom18 in 2024, Disney channels became a part of JioStar with the kids division led by Anu Sikka from Nickelodeon.

On 2 May 2026, Disney Channel India was rebranded a new logo by the original US version that was introduced a year prior and 9 months after the Latin American version and 7 months after both the Japanese and Canadian versions.

== Broadcast ==
The channel broadcasts in India and several neighboring countries. It was formerly broadcast in Bangladesh, Pakistan and Bhutan, but was removed for the following reasons:

The Government of Bangladesh banned the Indian feeds of Disney Channel and Disney XD from broadcasting in February 2013, citing non-availability of localized dubs for content, including the anime Doraemon, which was being broadcast only in Hindi. Pogo was banned for the same reason; three other channels were also banned for broadcasting without authorization. Later, the Southeast Asian feed of Disney Channel was made available on specific Bangladeshi cable providers.

Concerns about localization were raised in Pakistan as well, regarding the broadcast of Hindi-only dubs of Doraemon. In 2016, after increasing tensions between the countries, all Indian television channels were banned from broadcast by the Pakistan Electronic Media Regulatory Authority. The ban was reiterated after appeals in 2018.

In Bhutan, the channel was similarly removed due in 2017 to most of its programming being aired in Hindi rather than in English. This was part of a uniformity plan.

== Sister television channels ==
=== Disney Channel HD ===
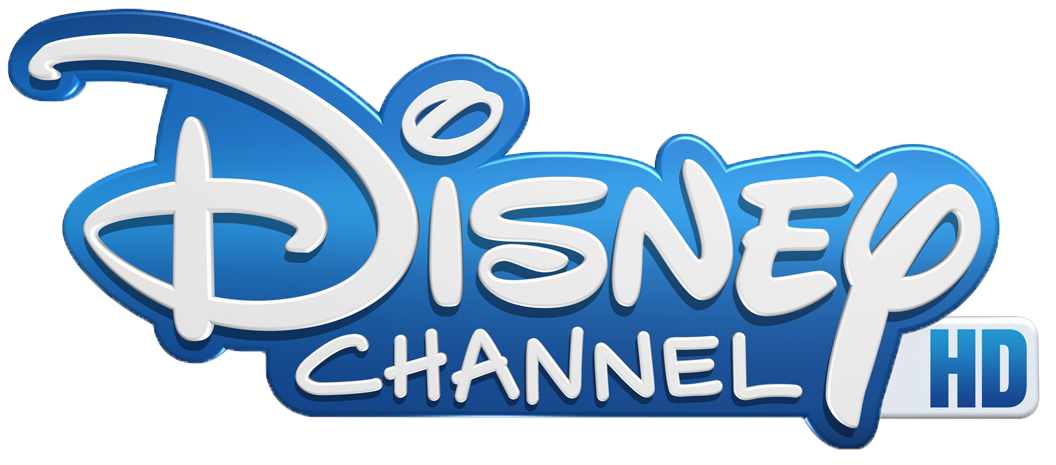
Logo of Disney Channel HD used since 2 May 2026

On 15 March 2023, Disney Channel HD was launched. The channel is available in English, Hindi, Tamil, and Telugu. It was originally planned to launch by 1 March 2020 and 11 December 2021, but it was postponed.

=== Disney Junior ===
The Playhouse Disney brand expanded to India in 2006 as a block on Disney Channel. On 4 July 2011, it was replaced by Disney Junior, which eventually became available as a 24-hour channel.

=== Disney International HD ===
On 5 October 2017, The Walt Disney Company India officially announced the launch of Disney International HD on 29 October 2017. The channel exclusively airs international live action content from the Disney Channel library such as Austin & Ally, K.C. Undercover, Liv and Maddie, Hannah Montana as well as Disney Channel Original Movies such as Teen Beach, Descendants, Zombies and Spin.

=== Hungama TV ===
Hungama TV was launched on 26 September 2004. The channel was originally owned by UTV Software Communications, but The Walt Disney Company India purchased it in 2006. The programming lineup mainly consists of Japanese and Indian animated shows.

=== Super Hungama ===
Originally launched as Toon Disney on 17 December 2004, then on 14 November 2009, the channel rebranded as Disney XD. On 6 January 2019, the channel rebranded as Marvel HQ. then on 1 March 2022 the channel rebranded as Super Hungama. The channel was launched with 4 new shows, including 3 Disney shows. These are Buzz Lightyear of Star Command, Big City Greens, Milo Murphy's Law and The Daltons. Apart from that, the channel's content and schedule remains the same as Marvel HQ.

== Programming ==
Unlike most Disney Channel networks around the world, the channel airs very little content from the North American networks. Disney Channel India mostly focuses on local and some Japanese content as they are more popular with Indian audiences. Due to popularity of Doraemon, it has been scheduled most of the time on the channel since 2011 despite not being a Disney show to maintain high viewership. Nowadays Doraemon is being aired most of the day along with occasional airings of Rudra Boom Chik Chik Boom and Perman.

== Logos ==
2004–2012

2012–2014

2014–2026

2026–present

== See also ==
- Disney Channel (United States)
- Hungama TV
- Super Hungama
- Pogo (TV channel)
- Cartoon Network (India)
- Nickelodeon (Indian TV channel)
- Disney Jr. (India)
- Sony YAY!
- Discovery Kids (India)
- Nickelodeon Sonic
