= The Suite Life of Karan & Kabir =

Indian channel broadcast by Disney Channel India

- Created by: Danny Kallis; Jim Geoghan
- Written by: Karan Agarwal; Tanmay Bhat
- Directed by: Vasant Valsan
- Starring: Namit Shah; Siddharth Thakkar; Shivshakti Sachdev; Tara Sutaria; Shruti Seth; Damandeep Singh Baggan; Shaynam Ladakhi; Ayesha Kaduskar
- Opening theme: "Haste Khelte Rehte"
- Country of origin: India
- Original language: Hindi
- No. of seasons: 2
- No. of episodes: 50 (list of episodes)

Production
- Running time: 22–27 minutes
- Production company: The Company

Original release
- Network: Disney Channel
- Release: 8 April 2012 – 18 August 2013

Related
- The Suite Life of Zack & Cody

The Suite Life of Karan & Kabir is a Disney Channel India sitcom, which premiered between 8 April 2012 to 18 August 2013. The series is an Indian adaptation of the American show The Suite Life of Zack & Cody.

Starring Siddharth Thakkar, Namit Shah, Shivshakti Sachdev, Tara Sutaria, Damman Baggan and Shruti Seth, the series is set in the Raj Mahal Hotel in Mumbai and centers on Karan and Kabir, trouble-making twins who live there. Other main characters include Vinnie, the intelligent candy-counter girl; Rani Oberoi, the wealthy daughter of the hotel's owner; Preeti, the hotel's assistant manager and mother of twins Karan & Kabir; and the hotel's aggressive manager, Mr. Maan Singh.

== Plot ==
The show follows Karan and Kabir, twin brothers who live in Raj Mahal Hotel (a parody of Hotel Taj) in Mumbai with their mother, Preeti Jaiswal, the assistant manager in the hotel. Similar to its parent series, The Suite Life of Zack & Cody, the series depicts the antics and mischief the boys are constantly up to, as well as the adventures of Rani Oberoi, the privileged and ditzy heiress of the Oberoi business, Vineeta or Vinnie, the candy-counter girl, and Mr. Maan Singh, the strict and dutiful manager who often acts as a foil to Karan and Kabir's schemes. The lazy housekeeper Shobha ji, the innocent bellboy Jang Bahadur, and the electrician "Digital" appear as supporting characters, along with the boys' friends Max and Noodle.

== Cast and characters ==
=== Main ===
- Namit Shah as Kabir Jaiswal: Kabir is the kind, generous, and smarter twin brother. He is less adventurous but always gets into his brother Karan's antics, mostly accidentally, often leading to trouble. He is the equivalent of Cody Martin in The Suite Life of Zack & Cody.
- Siddharth Thakkar as Karan Jaiswal: Karan is typically a self-centered, non-studious, outgoing, immature boy. He is 10 minutes older than his twin Kabir. He is the equivalent of Zack Martin in The Suite Life of Zack & Cody.
- Shivshakti Sachdev as Rani Uberoi: Rani Uberoi is the only daughter of the owner of the Raj Mahal Hotel where the twins live. Rani is a rich teenager with her own private suite at the hotel. She is the equivalent of London Tipton in The Suite Life of Zack & Cody.
- Tara Sutaria as Vinita "Vinnie" Mishra (season 1): Vinnie is the teenage candy-counter girl at the Raj Mahal Hotel, who also works as a babysitter for Karan and Kabir. She is the equivalent to Maddie Fitzpatrick in The Suite Life of Zack & Cody.
- Ayesha Kaduskar as Binnie Kukreja (season 2): In season 2 the character of "Vinnie" was replaced by "Binnie". The name and character's background is changed though the character is entirely similar.
- Shruti Seth as Priti Jaiswal: She is the single mother of Karan and Kabir, who also works as the assistant manager at the Raj Mahal Hotel. She is the equivalent of Carey Martin in The Suite Life of Zack & Cody.
- Damandeep Singh Baggan as Mr. Maan Singh: He is the manager of the Raj Mahal Hotel, who speaks with a large vocabulary and urbane vernacular and is often annoyed by Karan and Kabir's schemes. He is the equivalent of Mr. Marion Moseby in The Suite Life of Zack & Cody.
- Shaynam Ladakhi as Jang Bahadur: He is the bell-boy of the hotel, and an honest hard worker who is always ready to help anyone and often helps the boys in their mischief but ends getting scolded by Maan Singh who orders him to do overtime as a punishment. He is the equivalent of Esteban Ramirez in The Suite Life of Zack & Cody.

=== Recurring ===
- Vrajesh Hirjee as Digital (Season 1): He is the hotel engineer. He is constantly inventing new things which mostly fail and make trouble. He is the equivalent of Arwin.
- Farzil Pardiwalla as Toolkit (Season 2): The character "Digital" was replaced by Toolkit in season 2.
- Sulakshana Khatri as Shobha Ji: She is a 60-year-old hotel employee who doesn't like to work for long. She is the equivalent of Muriel.
- Abbas Syed as Vibhishan: He is the Restaurant Manager at the Raj Mahal Hotel whose name is often forgotten by the staff members. He is the equivalent of Patrick.
- Saniya Anklesaria as Max: She is one of Karan and Kabir's friends. She is the equivalent of Max in The Suite Life of Zack & Cody.
- Sahil Chauhan as Danzo: He is Karan and Kabir's school friend but also bullies other kids. Karan and Kabir both want to be in his gang once and invite him and his gang to their hotel. He is the equivalent to a one-time character named Drew who appeared in the first episode of The Suite Life of Zack and Cody.
- Armaan Malik as Zafar Ali.

== Episodes ==
=== Series overview ===
Series	Episodes	Originally released	
Series	Episodes	First released	Last released
1	26	8 April 2012	1 July 2012
2	24	27 January 2013	18 August 2013

=== Season 1 (2012) ===
No. overall	No. in season	Title	Original release date
1	1	"Grounded on the 23rd Floor"	April 8, 2012
Karan and Kabir get grounded for a week for rollerblading in the lobby, injuring Mr. Maan Singh in the process. When they find out a famous couple is getting married at the hotel, they buy a camera from Vinnie to take a picture of the couple that was rumored to be selling for 1 lac rupees. Karan sneaks into the wedding and takes the picture, only for Vinnie, Kabir, and Karan to be busted by Mr. Maan Singh. The boys are grounded again for another week after Priti finds out. Guest stars: Kuki Grewal as Clara, Gaffoor Shaikh as Andre, Akash Thapar as Aditya
2	2	"Hotel Hangout"	April 15, 2012
Karan and Kabir meet two new friends Max and Noodle and invite them over, but when the Danzo group finds out that they live in the Raj Mahal Hotel, they suddenly want to hang out with the twins instead, leaving Max and Noodle behind. Meanwhile, Vinnie tutors Rani in Maths and Rani gives Vinnie advice on how to talk to the hotel lifeguard Rahul. Guest stars: Saniya Anklesaria as Max, Ayush Narang as Noodle, Rishabh Chadha as Rahul, Sahil Chauhan as Danzo
3	3	"Vinnie Checks In"	April 22, 2012
A hotel guest named Rehan checks into the Raj Mahal Hotel and Vinnie seems to like him very much. When Rani invites her and Rehan to see a concert, she asks Vinnie to play along for one night and act rich. This backfires when Rehan and his parents stay another night in Mumbai, and when Karan and Kabir get involved. They get her into the imperial suite, but another guest, Shamsher Singh, checks into Vinnie's suite, so the boys must dismantle the suite in order for the wrestler to check out of the hotel. Guest stars: Satya as Rehan, Bobby Parvez as Rehan's father, Dhanushmati as Rehan's mother, Madan Singh as Shamsher Singh, Adarsh as Vipin
4	4	"The Fairest of Them All"	April 29, 2012
Kabir accidentally enters in a beauty pageant after he follows a cute girl Shipra into the dressing room to give her some flowers. When he hears Maan Singh coming he disguises himself as a girl. Kabir excels in the pageant but quits so that Shipra can win the money to open a place to help pets. Karan tries to enter in his place and win the prize money so they can buy bikes, but he is exposed as a boy by Kabir. Shipra is initially angry with Kabir when she finds out that Kabir is a boy but relents and gives him a kiss before leaving the Raj Mahal. Guest stars: Asif Ali Beg as Raghu, Reem Shaikh as Shipra, Simran Natekar as Shahana, Beena Malji as Shahana's mom
5	5	"Footloser"	May 13, 2012
Karan and Kabir enter DanceHindustanDance, a dance contest. When Karan hurts his ankle jumping on the bed after Max specifically told him not to do anything stupid, Kabir fills in for Karan despite being a terrible dancer. Rani loans Vinnie money for her parents trip to Malaysia so in return Vinnie works for Rani Until she can repay her. In the end the entire staff chip in some money so Vinnie can pay Rani back. Guest stars: Saniya Anklesaria as Max, Deepjyoti Das as Host
6	6	"Heck's Kitchen"	May 20, 2012
Mr. Maan Singh receives information that a food critic called Sanjeev Kumar is coming to the Raj Mahal to try out the food. He is told that Sanjeev puts different disguises (including that of an old Chinese man). Mr. Maan Singh then hires Karan and Kabir to sneak around the hotel and find out who exactly is Sanjeev Kumar. They conclude that a South Indian cowboy is actually Sanjeev Kumar and Mr. Maan Singh orders Chef Pappe to cook a wonderful meal for him. Things take a turn for the worse when Chef Pappe quits after being insulted, and Kabir must take over, having Rani, Vinnie, and Karan as his kitchen staff. What they don't know is that although the cowboy is impressed with his meal, he is actually not the real food critic Sanjeev Kumar, but he is Sanjeev Kantam. However, real Sanjeev Kumar suddenly appears to give the Raj Mahal another chance when he realizes the situation and the struggle to serve the cowboy. Chef Pappe then decides to go back to work at the Raj Mahal, where his being in charge assures that the Raj Mahal will get good reviews. Guest stars: Abbas Syed as Vibhishan, Shahnawaz Pradhan as Chef Pappe, Shauki as Sanjeev Kantam
7	7	"Hotel Inspector"	May 27, 2012
Maan Singh gives Karan and Kabir tickets to IPL Match while the health inspector Titli arrives at the Raj Mahal. Unfortunately, the boys arrive before the inspector does and, due to Karan's and Kabir's rats, it causes chaos in the hotel, getting Maan Singh fired. Together, they must devise a way to get Maan Singh back. Guest stars: Sulekshna as Shobhaji, Jhumma Mitra as Titli
8	8	"To Catch a Thief"	June 3, 2012
Jung Bahadur is accused of a theft after someone's jewelry was stolen. Karan and Kabir try to prove it wasn't him, but they end up crashing a party, for which they get punished. Meanwhile, Rani can't bring her dog onto her dad's ship, so Vinnie takes care of Rani's dog while she's gone. When Karan and Kabir overhear the real thieves talking about heading up to Rani's suite, the twins, Jung Bahadur, and Vinnie set a trap to catch them. Guest stars: Sulekshna as Shobhaji, Saurabh Mehta as Sindhu, Varun Vazir as Manu
9	9	"The Ghost Of Suite 613"	June 10, 2012
A rumor is circulating around the Raj Mahal Hotel that Suite 613 is haunted by a ghost named Shalini, whose husband left her for an actress. Their movie's name was Bhel puri ki kasam. Meanwhile, Karan plays practical jokes on everyone, embarrassing them. Later, when they hear that Rani has dropped her purse with one or two thousand rupees in Suite 613, Vinnie, Rani, Karan and Kabir all run up to get it. On the way, Shobhji tells them about Shalini, then leaves. When Maan Singh finds them in the suite later on, he tells them of the experience he had with Suite 613 when he was a bellhop. Then Karan dares Kabir to spend a night at 613: The person who runs out first owes the other ten rupees. In the suite, they try to talk to the spirit (Kabir, Karan, Rani, Vinnie and Jang Bahadur) getting Jung Bahdur possessed and making Kabir, Vinnie, Rani disappear then it is revealed to be a practical joke for Karan. At the end of the episode, Kabir and Karan look for Kabir's toy when a woman who looks exactly like Shalini approaches them and gives Kabir back the toy and leaves, passing through the wall with a portrait on it meaning the ghost of Shalini is real. Guest stars: Sulekshna as Shobhaji, Vrajesh Hirjee as Digital
10	10	"Poor Little Rich Girl"	June 17, 2012
Karan and Kabir watch a video of them being born, but in the video, their mother might have mistaken them for each other, so they become the complete opposite of themselves. Meanwhile, Rani becomes poor after finding out her father went bankrupt from a failed investment of diamonds, so she stays with Vinnie until her father can find a place for her to stay. At the end of the episode, Priti gets her sons' birth certificates from the hospital and tells which of her sons are which. Also Rani becomes rich again when Mr. Maan Singh tells her that her father struck oil in his diamond mine. Guest stars: Sulekshna as Shobhaji
11	11	"A Prom Story"	June 24, 2012
Vinnie's high school prom is coming up, and Karan finds out by throwing it at the Raj Mahal. When he overhears her saying that she likes a guy who has a five-year age difference from her, he thought it was him, not Ashwin the guy she liked. Meanwhile, a circus comes to the Raj Mahal, prompting Kabir to act like a mime. When Karan gets his heart broken by Vinnie, she gets her heart broken by Ashwin, who has a college girlfriend. Vinnie then agrees to dance with Karan. Guest stars: Rohan Golani as Ashwin, Kodak as Robert
12	12	"Band in Mumbai"	July 1, 2012
Karan, Kabir, Max and Noodles organize a band called DoubleRow for battle of the bands, but due to fighting, Kabir quits the band. On the day of the event, Max locks the twins in their closet, but they find their own way there, with help from Digital. Meanwhile, Vinnie and Rahul's band Waterworks for battle of the bands instruments' are funded by Rani after they promise she can be a back-up singer, but she is a terrible singer. Guest stars: Sulekshna as Shobhaji, Saniya Anklesaria as Max, Ayush Narang as Noodles, Rishabh Chadha as Rahul, Vrajesh Hirjee as Digital
13	13	"Kabir goes to Camp"	July 8, 2012
Kabir and Noodle go to math camp for a week, leaving Karan on his own for a few days. Meanwhile, Rani gets her learner's permit and while Mr. Maan Singh teaches her how to drive, her car ends up in the Raj Mahal hotel wall. When Karan starts to miss Kabir, he persuades Rani, Vinnie, and Shobhaji to drive up to camp to check on Kabir with him. Guest stars: Sulekshna as Shobhaji, Ayush Narang as Noodle
14	14	"It's a Mad, Mad, Mad Hotel"	July 15, 2012
When Karan and Kabir's football breaks a painting in the hallway, they find an old newspaper article stuck to it. It shows a man being arrested by the police, saying: "I will return for my treasure." Karan and Kabir start to look for the treasure. Vinnie overhears, and the twins let her help. In the article is a picture of Shobhaji, so Karan, Kabir and Vinnie ask her about it. Shobhaji agrees to help as long as she gets part of the treasure. Jung Bahadur and Rani join Karan, Kabir, Vinnie and Shobhaji to find the treasure, which effects much arguing and chaos. Desperate, Karan, Kabir, Vinnie, Rani and Jung Bahadur all imagine what their life would be like if they found the treasure, despite Rani already rich. They search frantically for the treasure, but they end up breaking into the bank of Raj Mahal. In the end, the real treasure was Shobhaji. Guest stars: Sulekshna as Shobhaji, Vrajesh Hirjee as Digital Note: When Jung Bahadur is having his fantasy, the symbols on the manager's counter still have a "R" for Raj Mahal.
15	15	"Cookin' with Heer and Ranjha"	July 22, 2012
Titli, the hotel inspector who attempted to replace Mr. Maan Singh as manager of the Raj Mahal, returns and informs Mr. Maan Singh that she is the manager of the hotel across the street. The son of the rival hotel owner Rajlalit likes Rani, but the owners of the hotel hate each other. Vinnie helps them meet behind everyone's back. Karan tries to make money from Kabir's cookies which are the best some people have ever tasted. Guest stars' Devansh Doshi as Rajlalit, Jhumma Mitra as Titli, Sulekshna as Shobhaji
16	16	"Rumours"	July 29, 2012
Rani starts a rumor about Vinnie and Rahul that angers Vinnie, eventually leading her into accidentally beginning a rumor about Rani that she has real fox fur in her closet. It turns out that she pronounced faux as fox, which caused Vinnie to think she had real animal furs. Kabir tries to make himself look less like Karan by dyeing his hair, but it turns green and he asks Karan to take his place in an interview. Guest stars: Sulekshna as Shobhaji, Rishabh Chadha as Rahul, Akash Thapar as Aditya
17	17	"Big Hair & Cricket"	August 5, 2012
Mr. Maan Singh takes Karan and Kabir to a cricket game, but when he accidentally catches a cricket ball that makes the Mumbai Ninjas lose the game, everyone in Mumbai hates him. Vinnie attempts to stop her hair from frizzing before going to a blind date Rani set up for her with a boy who sweats when he is nervous. Guest stars: Sulekshna as Shobhaji, Rehaan as Kunal, Rakesh Bidua as Hotel Guest
19	19	"Mama's Back"	August 19, 2012
The boys' uncle Jojo returns. Karan gets tired of living by his mother's boring rules, so Karan sneaks onto his uncle's bus the day he leaves. Priti decides to become the "fun" parent while his uncle becomes a responsible one. Rani trains Vinnie because of her lack of strength for gym class. Guest stars: Suraj Jagan as Jojo, Parth as Batul
20	20	"Hugs & Basketball"	August 26, 2012
Max hugs Karan after they win a basketball game, then Karan insults Max making her feel bad since she really likes him. The basketball team then makes him go on a date with her so that she'll feel better, but then the date goes horribly wrong, with Karan revealing it wasn't his own decision to come, and Max feels worse than ever. Vinnie helps Rani with her shopping problems. Guest stars: Saniya Anklesaria as Max, Ayush Narang as Noodles, Adil as Basketball player, Dhruv as Basketball player
21	21	"Crushed"	September 2, 2012
A classmate named Khushboo falls in love with Kabir because he is the only pupil who isn't mean to her. She asks him out on a date, and Kabir gets Karan to go on the date and revolt her. Kushboo finds out it is really Karan, not Kabir, on the date, and begins to like him, instead. Rani sets up her dog Princess on a date with another rich dog. Princess doesn't like the other dog, and falls in love with Vinnie's dog, Rocky. Guest stars: Abbas Syed as Vibhishan, Khushi Parekh as Khushboo, Sheena Bajaj as voice of Princess, Murtuza Kutianawala as voice of Rocky
22	22	"Rock Star in the House"	September 9, 2012
A famous rockstar Zafar Ali stays at the Raj Mahal. Rani and Vinnie try to see him while Karan obtains souvenirs to auction off to other fans. Kabir works on his science project, a high frequency laser, and Digital helps him even though it is against the rules. Guest stars: Armaan Malik as Zafar Ali, Vrajesh Hirjee as Digital
23	23	"Nurse Karan"	September 16, 2012
Kabir takes care of Priti when she is sick but, when Kabir falls ill, Karan needs to take care of them both. The staff at the Raj Mahal try to win Employee of the Month by sabotaging the other employees' stations. Guest stars: Vrajesh Hirjee as Digital
24	24	"Mumbai Holiday"	September 23, 2012
Prince Rajraj, The Prince of Ishkabar, stays at the Raj Mahal and becomes friends with Karan and Kabir. He tells them he just wants to be a normal child and Karan takes him to the mall while Kabir takes his place in a meeting with the mayor (Kabir wears a Shabakababa which is a worn on occasions in Rajraj's culture – it covers the face so nobody could tell it was Kabir). While trying to impress girls, Rajraj accidentally steals clothes while thinking that it was ok and that his people will pay for it. Karan and Rajraj end up in mall jail. Meanwhile, Rani thinks she has spotted a UFO and Vinnie helps her because Rani keeps ordering delicious and expensive food. In the end, it turns out to be a mylar balloon from Rani's birthday party caught on a TV antenna. Guest stars: Tejas as Rajraj, Shauki as Mr. Babalabaloo
25	25	"Smart & Smarterer"	September 23, 2012
Karan gets a bad grade in school and Priti says he will have to go to summer school if he can't keep his grades up. However, after he finds out that his friend gets more time to complete tests because he has dyslexia, Karan pretends that he has dyslexia, too. Maan Singh loses his voice, causing havoc in the hotel. Rani and Vinnie play chess but Rani keeps winning so they keep playing until Vinnie wins. When she can't, Rani eventually lets Vinnie win. Guest stars: Kurush Deboo as Mr. Sharma, Bhavesh as Rajesh
26	26	"Commercial Breaks"	September 30, 2012
A commercial for the Raj Mahal is being shot at the hotel. All of the employees have to audition. The director didn't like anybody who auditioned, but picked Rani because her father signs his paycheck. Rani is horrible, so she is fired and replaced by Mr. Maan Singh who trips and breaks his leg, so Priti (who had previously dated the director) does the commercial. Guest stars: Sulekshna as Shobhaji, Rishabh Chadha as Rahul, Akash Thapar as Aditya

=== Season 2 (2013) ===
No. overall	No. in season	Title	Original release date	Prod. code
27	1	"French 101"	January 27, 2013	TBA
The French Ambassador and his daughter visit the Raj Mahal Hotel, and both Karan and Kabir develop a crush on the daughter, Nicole, although neither of them know French. Following his mother's advice, Kabir locks Karan in a coat closet, then hires Mr. Maan Singh to translate for him. He eventually gets to dance with Nicole, but while doing so, Karan arrives with 2 cards: One full of compliments and one full of insults. Kabir takes the insults (which he mistakes for compliments) and the daughter goes to Karan. However, Rajesh, who speaks fluent French, gets Nicole at the end. Meanwhile, Jung Bahadur is upset when Rani can beat a street thief but he can't. To cheer him up, Binnie arranges a plan for Toolkit to pretend to be a thief and let Jung Bahadur defeat him. Things go wrong when Toolkit forgets about the plan and Jung Bahadur must fight a real thief instead. Guest stars: Kodak as Toolkit, Saloni Daini as Rajesh, Justine Bowles as Nicole
28	2	"Free Champak"	February 3, 2013	TBA
Karan and Kabir try to save the Raj Mahal's carriage horse (Champak) from being sold to a mean lumberjack when the horse carriage driver Sushil gets retired. Rani borrows Binnie's great grandmother's brooch, but when she loses it, Binnie makes her feel bad. Mr. Maan Singh arranges a banquet with Mrs. Singhania. The boys sneak Champak into the hotel and have him stay with Toolkit, but then Champak escapes so the boys look all around the hotel. Rani tells Priti that the brooch is in the trash but she is not looking there. But Priti tells her that a good friend would help look for it. So Toolkit and Rani look for it in the dumpster and run into a homeless guy. At the end, Mrs. Singhania convinces Mr. Maan Singh not to retire Champak, and the homeless man comes to the hotel with Binnie's brooch. Guest stars: Kodak as Toolkit, Preeti Kochchar as Mrs. Singhania, Prem Prakash as Sushil
29	3	"Odd Couples"	February 10, 2013	TBA
Rani likes a merit scholar Akshay, and Binnie helps her to trick him into thinking she is smart. Kabir moves into a coat closet because Karan is too messy and doesn't clean his side of the room. To Karan's surprise, Kabir makes the room more "home" like by putting in a flat-screen TV and more. It has the gag out of the TV show The Odd Couple that Karan is like Oscar and Kabir is like Felix. Guest stars: Saloni Daini as Rajesh, Abhishek Patnaik as Akshay, Ayush Narang as Noodle, Nakshatra Doshi as Dabbu
30	4	"Day Care"	February 17, 2013	TBA
Binnie requires Karan and Kabir's help to run a day care center. Rani takes Mr. Maan Singh and Priti to yoga lessons, but when Rani doesn't like the yoga teacher, she decides to be the teacher. Guest stars: Shivansh Kotia as Krish, Spandan Chatuvedi as Dia, Shauki as Yoga Guru
31	5	"Forever Plaid"	February 24, 2013	TBA
Karan and Kabir make a hole in a wall, and Toolkit helps them fix it. Karan and Kabir then discover that they can see dance troupe girls in the next room, so they invite their friends to look in the hole too. They later get found out by Mr. Maan Singh and Priti and they all end up with a sore eye. Meanwhile, Rani transfers to Binnie's school and causes her to get a detention, later they pretend to be nuns from Sri Lanka. Guest stars: Kodak as Toolkit, Beena Malji as Sister Rosy, Saloni Daini as Rajesh, Erica Fernandes as Supriya, Surdeepta Singh as Priya, Priyanka Sharma as Choti
32	6	"Election"	March 3, 2013	TBA
Karan and Kabir both run in a school election, and Rani and Binnie take sides: Binnie tries to help Kabir and Rani tries to help Karan. At first, Karan was getting more attention (by making lies that the students will get ice cream, supermodels and a skate park if he is president). Later, Kabir gets the attention after Karan drops out because he thought that Kabir's ideas were better and he would want him to be president. Guest stars: Saloni Daini as Rajesh, Saniya Anklesaria as Max, Kashish Rupani as Khushi
33	7	"Neither a Borrower nor a Quizzer"	March 10, 2013	TBA
Karan wants Kabir to drop out of the junior quiz competition because he owes the Rs 400 to his competitor. Rani and Binnie do community service. Rani sees that her rival got in the newspaper for doing community service, so Rani brings the paparazzi with her to show off herself doing community service. Sister Rosy also always comes in at the wrong time when Rani is faking work and Binnie and her friends were pushed out of the way by Rani, all the credit to Rani while Binnie, Supriya, and Priya are the ones doing all the work, and Binnie becomes infuriated as a result. Guest stars: Beena Malji as Sister Rosy, Erica Fernandes as Supriya, Surdeepta Singh as Priya, Poorvika Mehra as Debashree, Hardik Thakkar as Tanmay, Zareen Irani as Quiz Host
34	8	"Maan Singh's Big Brother"	March 17, 2013	TBA
Mr. Maan Singh's smaller-in-size but older-in-age brother comes to the Raj Mahal. He is very rich and they do not really like each other much. Karan and Kabir get one bicycle together because they do not have enough money to buy their own individual ones. However, Karan begins to keep the bike all for himself which makes Kabir angry. Binnie and Jung Bahadur send Rani fake horoscopes to take advantage of her, which backfires when Rani finds out. Guest stars: Sonu as Pahdad Singh
35	9	"Not So Suite 16"	March 24, 2013	TBA
Binnie and Rani's 16th birthday parties are scheduled on the same day, even though Rani's birthday was 6 months ago. Rani refuses to change her date out of selfishness and bribes people with gifts if they come to her party. Kabir gets Binnie the perfect gift. Karan wants it, but Kabir won't give it to him; he instead helps find Karan a suitable gift. Aside from her family, only Karan shows up at Binnie's party while everyone else goes to Rani's, thus earning a hug. Binnie and Rani both have a miserable time and in the end, reconcile and merge parties. Guest stars: Erica Fernandes as Supriya, Surdeepta Singh as Priya, Gauri Verma as Binnie's Nani, Dane Fernandes as Golu
36	10	"Books & Birdhouses"	March 31, 2013	TBA
Rani steals Binnie's idea for a school assignment and turns it into a famous book. Rani's theft backfires when she is sued for a million dollars because Binnie's idea plagiarized a previous book. Meanwhile, Kabir signs up for an advanced Calculus Math Class covering tables, Conversion and Convergences, but no one, even the teacher, shows up. Kabir is jealous that Karan is acing woodshop, and signs up for it instead. He does not know anything about wood and ends up getting his first demerit and C. Guest stars: Beena Malji as Sister Rosy, Saloni Daini as Rajesh, Deepjyothi Das as Ladkawala Sir, Zareen Irani as Woodshop Assistant
37	11	"Kept Man"	April 14, 2013	TBA
Karan befriends a rich boy named Krish. He lavishes Karan with expensive gifts including tickets to a Mumbai Ninjas game and a Mathunga Monkeys concert. Karan also begins rejecting Kabir, even refusing to attend his speech. After Krish tries to get Karan to tape the concert, Karan finally ends their friendship. He makes amends with Kabir and agrees to attend his speech. Meanwhile, Rani and Binnie have to take care of a baby simulator for school, which keeps them up all night. Binnie mainly does all the work, while Rani does hardly any except buying him expensive clothing and giving Jung Bahadur the position of a nanny. The doll eventually falls out of a window and breaks. Binnie and Rani return it to Sister Rosy, expecting to fail, but she instead gives them an A+ for figuring out the purpose of the assignment. They are overjoyed, but Binnie gets in trouble when the recorder in the doll plays a message of her insulting Sister Rosy. Guest stars: Beena Malji as Sister Rosy, Abbas Ali Ghaznavi as Krish, Erica Fernandes as Supriya, Surdeepta Singh as Priya
38	12	"Chaos"	April 21, 2013	TBA
Shilpaji, as astrologer visits the Raj Mahal and has a vision that Priti's birthday party will be full of chaos. Meanwhile, Binnie tries to get Rani to wear a new friend Mini's dress but Rani doesn't want to wear it, as it was not made by someone famous. Kabir, the only twin that wears sweater vests, becomes paranoid and avoids anything that remotely resembles the astrologer's vision – even the surprise birthday party that he, Karan, and the other Raj Mahal employees are throwing for Priti. Binnie tricks Rani into wearing the dress but Rani soon finds out. Guest stars: Shweta Tripathi as Mini, Shilpa Mehta as Shilpaji, Kodak as Toolkit
39	13	"Have a Nice Trip"	April 28, 2013	TBA
A hotel patron claims he fell on Karan's skateboard. Karan and Kabir find out that he faked the accident to get free things from the Raj Mahal. The Raj Mahal staff have to serve their "injured" guest with the best service they have, or risk the hotel's reputation being trashed by the man. Guest stars: Dhriti Bhatia as Sweety, Kareem Haji as Pravin
40	14	"Going for the Gold"	May 5, 2013	TBA
Toolkit enters the Hotel Engineers' competition which is taking place at the Raj Mahal. Karan and Kabir find out that one of the competitors, Sachin Chatturvedi, is cheating, so they try to help Toolkit win. Rani opens her own store and hires Binnie to be in it, but Rani keeps on insulting the guests and ruining business. Guest stars: Kodak as Toolkit, Lalit Parashar as Sachin
41	15	"Ask Karan"	May 12, 2013	TBA
Karan wants a job on the school paper because the only other job was on the band. He then uses his part of the paper (the "Ask Kiran" column) to get a girl named Shweta. Rani has trouble getting to sleep because there are diamond dust bunnies under her mattress. Guest stars: Saloni Daini as Rajesh, Sayuri N. Haratkar as Shweta, Poorvika Mehra as Debashree, Anushka & Ashoi as Smita & Pooja
42	16	"Ranionline"	May 19, 2013	TBA
Kabir helps Rani with her website Yay Rani! Starring Rani Oberoi and produces a video on her site. Karan gets addicted to Gangs of Rakshaspur, an online game. Mr. Maan Singh is playing the game too, so they become friends online. Kabir is tired of all the things Rani makes him do (wearing high heels, etc.), so he quits. Rani's site then starts to get less viewers and she apologizes to Kabir, inviting him back to be the producer. Meanwhile, Karan and Mr. Maan Singh discover each other's identity in the game and they later try to quit because the game proves to be addictive. Guest stars: Nida Chakraborthy as Honey Mirchandani
43	17	"Of Clocks and Contracts"	May 26, 2013	TBA
Karan tries to negotiate a better contract for Priti as the Raj Mahal's assistant manager to Mr. Maan Singh so they could stay at the Raj Mahal. After losing her science tutor, Rani asks and pays Kabir to help her with her project. Binnie also wants Kabir's help and bribes him with concert tickets to Purab Pashchim. Kabir quits and Rani and Binnie combine their machines, inventing a French Fry maker. Guest stars: Deepak as Rahul Chopra
44	18	"The Toolkit That Came to Dinner"	July 3, 2013	TBA
Toolkit couldn't fix things right because his mother moved out. When Karan and Kabir invite Toolkit over for dinner and stay overnight, he just won't leave, because he doesn't want to be alone. Priti is getting annoyed at him so she forces Karan and Kabir to make him go. Meanwhile, Rahul dumps Rani and she wants to find a way to get back with him. Guest stars: Kodak as Toolkit, Rishabh Chadha as Rahul, Vinti Idnani as Priya Patel, Priya Singh as Toolkit's friend
45	19	"Bhalu Scouts"	July 7, 2013	TBA
The boys become Bhalu Scouts(Bear Scouts), with Mr. Maan Singh as their leader. When all of their food disappears, Karan saves the team from starvation by finding wild food. Kabir is jealous, and when he meets an old man (Niranjan Israni) who gives him food, Kabir lies to the team and says that he found it himself. While the boys are away, Priti tries to have free time, but Binnie and Rani keep bothering her about a guy Binnie is dating. The guy is Rani's old boyfriend and she still likes him. Guest stars: Saloni Daini as Rajesh, Niranjan Israni as Haaji, Ayush Narang as Noodle
46	20	"Aptitude"	July 14, 2013	TBA
Karan and Kabir are surprised by their aptitude test scores: Karan is told he will be a CEO, while Kabir is going to turn out as a sanitation engineer. Karan soon starts acting smart, while Kabir starts to have a negative attitude. Meanwhile, Binnie saves the life of a Faloodistan ambassador, and later Rani. She becomes famous for a little while and Rani doesn't like it. But eventually new news comes and Binnie is sad to find out that her 15 minutes of fame are over. Guest stars: Abbas Sayyed as Vibhishan, Renji as Faloodistan Ambassador, Anisha Verma as Reporter, Erica Fernandes as Supriya, Surdeepta Singh as Priya
47	21	"Nugget of History"	July 21, 2013	TBA
Maan Singh's grandmother, Sukinder Kaur Dhillon (Daman Baggan in a dual role), comes to visit, and helps Karan with his history paper about "1940s Indian Independence Movement", which he writes based on a man named Balwinder Singh Deol, whom according to Sukinder was the host of the a pro-independence radio show. But Karan gets a "F" because the teacher claims that the facts in Karan's paper are inaccurate. Karan gets help from Grandma Maan Singh to prove Karan's history teacher was wrong. Meanwhile, Rani decides to learn the hotel business. She hilariously attempts to learn each job- bell boy, housekeeper, enquirer etc. until the Raj Mahal staff decided to complain to Maan Singh.
48	22	"Health and Fitness"	July 28, 2013	TBA
Every employee at the Raj Mahal is required to take a cholesterol test, and Mr. Maan Singh is afraid of the needle. Kabir tries to get Chef Pappe to eat healthily after bacon bits were found in his blood after the cholesterol test. After looking in a slanted mirror that distorts images, Rani is worried about being overweight, and Binnie is worried about being too thin. Rani starts to obsessively exercise and eat nothing while Binnie tries to eat a lot. In an effort to keep Karan from eating too much candy, Priti gives him a strictly healthy diet. Guest stars: Shahnawaz Pradhan as Chef Pappe
49	23	"Summer of Our Discontent"	August 4, 2013	TBA
Kabir searches for a summer job, and finds a "help wanted" sign at the local bookshop. When the owner realizes Kabir is friends with Rani, he will only hire Kabir if he will set him up on a date with her. Meanwhile, Karan repeats English in summer school, but when Karan discovers he is the smartest student in his summer school class, all the other kids give him three hanging wedgies but in the end he tutors them too which causes them to pass the entire summer school class. Karan later finds the wedgies strangely relaxing.
50–51	24–25	"Goodbye Suite"	August 18, 2013	TBA
After Priti gets a job as a senior manager at another hotel, she and the boys find that they have to move out of the Raj Mahal Hotel. In order to make everyone remember them, Karan and Kabir prank everyone before pulling an ultimate prank on Mr. Man Singh. Meanwhile Rani discovers that her father is planning to take to her to London. To convince him to leave her in India, she enlists the help of Binnie. (Note: This episode serves as a one-hour movie, episode 23 and 24, and the series finale) Guest stars: Megha Burman as Nia, Trisha Kanga as Shivani, Priyanka Sharma as Lata, Noor & Harry as Sur-Taal
