= Sunny Singh =

Sunny Singh may refer to:

- Sunny Singh (actor) (born 1988), Indian actor
- Sunny Singh (cricketer) (born 1986), Indian cricketer
- Sunny Singh (filmographer) (born 1986), Indian-American filmographer, programmer and music archivist under the name Hate5six
- Sunny Singh (writer) (born 1969), Indian writer
- Sunny Singh, fictional character in the 1993 Indian sitcom Dekh Bhai Dekh
- Sunny Singh, fictional character in the 2011 Indian sitcom Best of Luck Nikki
- Sunny Singh, child actor in the 1996 film English Babu Desi Mem
- Sunny Singh, associate of George Naicker (1919–1998), Indian South African political activist
- Sandeep Singh (born 1986), Indian field hockey player
- Sukhjit Singh (cricketer) (born 1996), British Indian cricketer

== See also ==
- Sunny Singh Gill, English football referee
- Sunny (name)
- Singh, Indian surname
- Sunil Singh (disambiguation)
