= Anklesaria =

Anklesaria is a surname. Notable people with the surname include:

- Saniya Anklesaria (fl. 2009), Indian actress
- Swaminathan Aiyar (born 1938), Indian economist, journalist and columnist
