= Sunny (name) =

Sunny is a unisex name. It can be a given name, a surname, and a nickname, especially from names such as: Sana, Sunil, Sundeep, Sunita, Shams Suniel, or Suraj. Notable people with the name include:

== Given name or nickname ==
- Sunny Anderson (born 1975), American chef and personality
- Sunny Ang (1939–1967), Singaporean law student and executed murderer
- Sunny Balwani (born 1965), American businessman, former president and chief operating officer of Theranos indicted for fraud and conspiracy
- Sunny Bawra, Indian music director
- Sunny von Bülow (1932–2008), American heiress and socialite
- Sunny Buick (born 1970), Canadian-born tattoo artist, painter
- Sunny Chan (born 1967), Hong Kong television and film actor
- Sunny Collings, New Zealand psychiatrist and health executive
- Sunny Deol (born 1956), Bollywood actor
- Sunny Fong (born 1977), Canadian fashion designer
- Sunny Franco (born 1997), Australian soccer player
- Sunny Golloway, American collegiate baseball coach
- Sunny Hostin (born 1968), American lawyer, journalist, and television host
- Sunny Hundal (born 1977), British journalist, blogger and academic
- Sunny Jain (born 1975), American dhol player, drummer, and composer
- Sunny Johnson (1953–1984), American actress
- Sunny Joseph (born 1957), Indian cinematographer and director
- Kim Seon-yeong (curler) (born 1993), South Korean curler nicknamed "Sunny"
- Sunny Ekeh Kingsley (born 1981), Nigerian footballer
- Sunny Lane (born 1980), American adult film star
- Sunny Lax (born 1986), Hungarian trance music producer
- Sunny Leone (born 1981), American-Canadian model and actress, and former adult film star
- Sunny Mabrey (born 1975), American actress and model
- Sunny Mehta (born 1978), American poker player, writer, and analyst
- Sunny Murray (1936–2017), American jazz drumming pioneer
- Sunny Nijar (born 1988), Indian film and television actor
- Sunny Obama (born 2012), pet dog of the Obama family
- Sunny Omoregie (born 1989), Nigerian footballer
- Sunny Sauceda, American Tejano musician
- Sunny Singh (disambiguation), several people
- Sunny Skylar (1913–2009), American composer, singer, lyricist, and music publisher
- Sunny Sohal (born 1987), Indian cricketer
- Stephen Sunday (born 1988), Nigerian professional footballer nicknamed Sunny
- Sunny Suwanmethanont (born 1981), Thai actor
- Sunny Thomas (1941–2025), Indian shooting coach
- Sunny Besen Thrasher (born 1976), Canadian actor
- Sunny Varkey (born 1957), Dubai-based Indian education entrepreneur and philanthropist
- Sunny Wayne, Indian film actor in Malayalam cinema

- Sunny Judkins Giuliano, (born 1942) Italian actor

== Stage or ring name ==
- Heather Wheatman, Indian-born British pop singer with stage name Sunny Leslie
- Lee Soon-kyu (born 1989), South Korean singer with stage name Sunny
- Tammy Lynn Sytch (born 1972), American professional wrestling personality with stage name Sunny
- Patricia Summerland, professional wrestler with stage name Sunny

== Surname ==
- Arafat Sunny (born 1986), Bangladeshi cricketer
- C. V. Sunny (born 1967), Indian basketball player
- Elias Sunny (born 1986), Bangladeshi cricketer
- Hassan Sunny (born 1984), Singaporean footballer
- K. P. A. C. Sunny (1934–2006), Indian actor in Malayalam films
- Siju Sunny, Indian actor in Malayalam films
- Tehmina Sunny (born 1980), English actress
- VJ Sunny (born 1989), Indian actor in Telugu television and films

== Fictional characters ==
- Sunny, a prostitute in J.D. Salinger's The Catcher in the Rye
- Sunny, the title character of the animated television series Sunny Day
- Sunny (Metal Gear), in the Metal Gear series
- SUNNY, the main character of the role-playing psychological horror game Omori
- Sunny, the literal sun girl from the animated series Mr Moon
- Sunny Starscout, the main character of the animated film My Little Pony: A New Generation
- Sunny or Kim Sun, a supporting character in K-drama Goblin: The Lonely and Great God by Kim Eun-sook
- Sunny Baudelaire, in the Series of Unfortunate Events books by Lemony Snicket
- Sunny Carstairs, played by Courtney Thorne-Smith in the 1987 American comedy movie Revenge of the Nerds II: Nerds in Paradise
- Cure Sunny/Glitter Sunny, magical girl alias of Akane Hino/Kelsey Ace in the anime series Smile PreCure!/Glitter Force
- Sunny Lee, in the soap opera Neighbours
- Sunny Milk, in the Touhou Project series
- Sunny, one of the nine default player characters in the game Minecraft added in the 1.19.3 update.

== See also ==
- Sunny (disambiguation)
