= Raavi (TV series) =

2013 Indian television series

- Genre: Drama
- Written by: Vikas Kapoor; Syed Javed Naeem; Richa Gautam; Brij Katyal; Hansmukh Gandhi; Prabhakar Gupta; Fareed Khan; Permander Singh Shekhawat
- Directed by: Naresh Khanna; Prashant Sethi
- Country of origin: India
- Original language: Hindi
- No. of seasons: 2

Production
- Producers: Anupam K Kalidhar; Kashinath Shukla
- Production companies: A K Company & Taashi Entertainment Pvt. Ltd.

Original release
- Network: Big Magic
- Release: 9 September 2013 – 3 April 2015

Raavi is an Indian drama television series which premiered on 9 September 2013. It aired on Big Magic through Monday to Friday. The show starred Rimmi Srivastav and Rashmi Singh.

== Plot ==
Raavi is the story of a girl who grows up disguised as a boy named Ravinder in a Punjabi family. She discovers a magic mobile and uses it for people's good. The whole story revolves around how she prevents the mobile from falling into wrong hands. She lives in Dharam pura, Punjab.

== Cast ==
- Rucha Gujarathi as Scientist Falaq
- Rimmi Srivastav as Raavi/Ravinder
- Rashmi Singh /Gauri Singh/Preeti Gandwani as Amrita (Raavi's Mother)
- Govind Pandey as Amrita`s father-in-law
- Deepesh Bhan
- Karan Singh Chhabra as Police Officer
- Soneer Vadhera as Jasbeer
- Aryan Prajapati as Aman
- Lilliput as Kaaleshwar
- Musharraf Rahman Khan as Mr. Sinha
- Vinod Kapoor as Chandraprakash Thakur/ Shamsher
- Saloni Daini as Cameo
