= Life's Good (film) =

2022 Indian drama film

- Directed by: Anant Mahadevan
- Written by: Sujit Sen
- Produced by: Anand Shukla
- Starring: Jackie Shroff; Rajit Kapur; Saniya Anklesaria; Ankita Shrivastav
- Cinematography: Alphonse Roy
- Music by: Abhishek Ray
- Release date: 9 December 2022
- Country: India
- Language: Hindi

Life's Good is a 2022 Indian Hindi-language drama film produced by Anand Shukla under his banner EktAnand Pictures, and directed by Anant Mahadevan. The film stars Jackie Shroff, Rajit Kapur, Mohan Kapoor, Anannaya Vij, Saniya Anklesaria, and Ankita Shrivastav, with Sunita Sen Gupta, Nakul Sahdev, and Saanand Verma appearing in supporting roles. The story is inspired by the personal diary of screenwriter Sujit Sen, documenting his stay in a Mumbai hospital. The film was originally scheduled to be released on 10 August 2018 but delays caused it to be pushed back; a new release date has been scheduled for 9 December 2022.

== Cast ==
- Jackie Shroff as Rameshwar
- Ananya Vij
- Saniya Anklesaria as Mishti
- Nakul Sahdev
- Rajit Kapur
- Darshan Jariwala
- Mohan Kapoor
- Sunita Sen Gupta as Reema
- Saanand Verma

== Soundtrack ==
The film's soundtrack is composed by Abhishek Ray. Lyrics are written by Manvendra and Nivedita Joshi.

Track listing
No.	Title	Lyrics	Singer(s)	Length
1.	"Palko Ke Palne"	Nivedita Joshi	Shreya Ghoshal	5:12
2.	"Bairi Badra"	Manvendra	Abhishek Ray	6:45
3.	"Sapna Pala"	Nivedita Joshi	Shaan	5:12
4.	"Rut Bheege Tan"	Manvendra	Asha Bhosle	4:35
