= Sunny =

Sunny may refer to:

== People ==
- Sunny (name), including a list of people and characters with the name
- Sunny (singer), member of Girls' Generation
- Tammy Lynn Sytch, professional wrestling personality known as "Sunny".
- Sun Diego, German rapper
- Sunny, of Sue and Sunny
- Kim Seon-yeong (curler), South Korean curler nicknamed "Sunny"

== Animals ==
- Sunny (born 2025), a bald eagle offspring of Jackie and Shadow
- Sunny (dog), Obama family pet
- Bluegill, a fish species also known as a "Sunny"

== Music ==
- "Sunny" (Bobby Hebb song), 1966 jazz standard
- Sunny (musical), a 1925 Jerome Kern musical
- Sunny (Neil Sedaka album), 1979
- "Sunny" (Morrissey song), 1995
- Sunny (Towa Tei album), 2011
- "Sunny" (Yorushika song), 2024
- "Sunny", a song by Stereophonics on their 2015 album Keep the Village Alive
- "Sunny", a song by Brockhampton from Saturation II, 2017

== Film and television ==
- Sunny (1930 film), a film adaptation of the musical
- Sunny (1941 film), a film adaptation of the musical
- Sunny (1984 film), an Indian film directed by Anil Joshi
- Sunny (2008 film), a South Korean film about South Korean entertainers in the Vietnam War
- Sunny (2011 film), a South Korean film about a group of old high school friends
- Sunny (2021 film), an Indian Malayalam-language film directed by Ranjith Sankar
- Sunny (2022 film), an Indian Marathi-language film directed by Hemant Dhome
- Sunny (TV series)
- "Sunny" (Ray Donovan), a 2014 television episode

== Radio stations ==
- KODA (Sunny 99.1), in Houston, Texas
- KSNE-FM (Sunny 106.5), in Las Vegas, Nevada
- KTSM-FM (Sunny 99.9), in El Paso, Texas
- WEAT (Sunny 107.9), in West Palm Beach, Florida, formerly on 104.3 FM as Sunny 104.3
- WOCL (105.9 Sunny FM), in Orlando, Florida, formerly known as Sunny 105.9
- WSNY (94.7 known as "Sunny 95"), in Columbus, Ohio
- Sunny, a former music channel on XM Satellite Radio playing a Beautiful Music format

== Vehicles ==
- Nissan Sunny, a vehicle
- SS Sunny, an Indonesian cargo ship in service 1959–69
- Airkraft Sunny, a Swiss ultralight aircraft

== Other uses ==
- Sunny (Minecraft), one of the default player skins in Minecraft
- Sunny (manga), manga series by Taiyō Matsumoto
- Sunny Optical, Chinese lens manufacturer
- Sunny Co., Ltd., a member of the Seiyu Group
- Sunny, a character of the book series Wings of Fire

== See also ==
- Sonny (disambiguation)
- Sunni Islam, the main branch of Islam
