= Best of Luck Nikki =

Indian sitcom

- Best of Luck Nikki logo
- Genre: Sitcom
- Based on: Good Luck Charlie by: Phil Baker; Drew Vaupen
- Directed by: David Polycarp; Vasant Valsan
- Starring: Sheena Bajaj; Gurdeep Punj; Gireesh Sahdev; Murtuza Kutianawala; Aakash Nair; Anannya Kolvankar; Lakshay Dhamija
- Theme music composer: Jeanne Lurie; Chen Neeman; Aris Archontis
- Opening theme: Aaja Sang Baby
- Composers: Stephen R. Phillips & Tim P.
- Country of origin: India
- Original language: Hindi
- No. of seasons: 4
- No. of episodes: 103 episodes (+ 6 specials) (list of episodes)

Production
- Executive producers: Phil Baker; Drew Vaupen
- Running time: 20–30 minutes
- Production companies: The Company; Endemol

Original release
- Network: Disney Channel
- Release: 3 April 2011 – 16 April 2016

Related
- Good Luck Charlie

Best of Luck Nikki is an Indian sitcom that originally aired on Disney Channel from 3 April 2011 to 16 April 2016. The series is the official Indian adaptation of the American series Good Luck Charlie, with a similar plot.

The adaptation was created by Phil Baker and Drew Vaupen, two of the creators of the original Good Luck Charlie, because they believed the series would be a great appeal to everyone in Indian households, not just children and teens. The episodes revolve around the Singh family as they adjust to the birth of their fourth child, Nikki. In each episode, Dolly Singh, the older sister, creates a video diary with advice for Nikki on navigating their family and life as a teenager.

== Plot ==
The series revolves around a Punjabi family in Delhi, India, the Singh family, who are still adjusting to the birth of their fourth child Nikita, nicknamed Nikki. When parents Himani and Avatar Singh return to work, they ask their three older children Dolly, Rohan and Sunny to help raise their youngest sister. The events in each episode become material for a video diary series that Dolly creates, which she hopes will one day provide useful advice for Nikki. At the end of each video, Dolly says, "Best of luck, Nikki!".

Season 1 revolves around a studious Dolly and her crush on a boy named Ritesh, and she has adventures with her best friend Parminder, nicknamed Pam. Sunny frequently challenges the nosy neighbour Roli Aunty, while Rohan and his best friend Popi work on their band and try to impress girls. Himani has just returned to work after a maternity break, and Avatar is busy with his electronics business.

Season 2 shows Dolly dating her childhood nemesis Rahul, and Pam starts dating Rahul's best friend Jatin. Sunny has also started dating and tries to impress some of his classmates while maintaining his constant pranks. Rohan and Popi prepare to begin college, while Himani and Avatar struggle with a growing Nikki and their work.

Season 3 follows all of the children who have now grown up, and Himani who is pregnant again with a boy, later named Bobby. Avatar is busy with work, while Sunny still indulges in pranks and experiences typical high-school problems. Dolly is now dating the basketball captain Ayaan, and Rohan experiments with his career choices at college. Nikki enrolls in a playschool, and they all help with raising Bobby. As the season's end, Avatar mistakenly frees an exotic termite that destroys the family home, forcing the Singhs to move.

Season 4 is the final of the series and was released after a long wait. All the characters had aged and Himani became pregnant again. Avatar struggles to arrange their older house and keeps the family in a one-room flat while waiting. Rohan and Popi move to their own flat. Rohan has entered culinary school, while Dolly begins interning with her father and pursues journalism. She starts dating her father's assistant Avishkaar, while Sunny starts dating Roli Aunty's granddaughter Riya.

The series ends with Rohan operating a food truck in partnership with Avatar, Dolly moving to Mumbai for studies, Bobby becoming the next chhota shaitan (devil child in Hindi), Nikki finally accepting Bobby and Kritika (the 6th and final child of the Singhs and nicknamed Kookie) as her siblings and Himani delivering her last and sixth child in addition to her work as host at her news company. Dolly's last video diary is completed and Nikki is set to follow in Dolly's footsteps by recording video diaries for Kookie (Kritika).

== Cast and characters ==
=== Main ===
- Sheena Bajaj as Dolly Singh: Himani and Avatar's eldest daughter; Rohan, Sunny, Nikki, Bobby and Kookie's sister; Ritesh and Rahul's former girlfriend; Ayaan's girlfriend. Sensing that she will not be around much as Nikki grows up, she produces and directs video diaries to give Nikki advice for her teenage years. She was the most responsible among the kids and was always shown to care about her siblings. Dolly is the equivalent of Teddy Duncan, played by Bridgit Mendler.
- Gurdeep Punj as Himani Singh: Avatar's wife; Rohan, Dolly, Sunny, Nikki, Bobby and Kookie's mother. She used to work as a hospital nurse and later a host for a news channel and is often portrayed as dutiful, protective, and comedic. Himani is the equivalent of Amy Duncan in Good Luck Charlie, played by Leigh-Allyn Baker.
- Gireesh Sahedev as Avatar Singh: Owner of Avatar Bijlee Company (ABC); Himani's husband; Rohan, Dolly, Sunny, Nikki, Bobby and Kookie's father. He is often scared of Himani and is very protective toward Dolly. Avatar's equivalent is Bob Duncan, played by Eric Allan Kramar.
- Murtuza Kutianawala as Rohan Singh: Himani and Avatar's eldest son; Dolly, Sunny, Nikki, Bobby and Kookie's brother. He often appears awkward, somewhat careless, easy going and childish, but on numerous occasions has been known to be resourceful, creative, and intelligent. He also happens to be a great cook and is shown to have enrolled in culinary school during the Season 4. He has also moved out in his own rented flat shared with Popi, in Season 3. Rohan is the equivalent of PJ Duncan, played by Jason Dolley.
- Anannya Kolvankar as Nikita "Nikki" Singh: Himani and Avatar's second daughter; Rohan, Dolly, Sunny, Bobby and Kookie's sister. Nikki is the equivalent of Charlie Duncan, played by Mia Talerico. She is loved by everyone.
- Aakash Nair as Sunny Singh: Himani and Avatar's second son; Rohan, Dolly, Nikki, Bobby and Kookie's brother; Riya's love interest. He is a prankster and troublemaker, often sarcastic and lazy, he can also be dutiful and determined. He initially struggles with the arrival of Nikki and is the last one in the family to get used to her, until Dolly helps him. He deeply cares for his family but seldom shows it. Sunny is the equivalent of Gabe Duncan, played by Bradley Steven Perry.
- Lakshay Dhamija as Bobby Singh: Himani and Avatar's youngest son; Rohan, Dolly, Sunny, Nikki and Kookie's brother. He was born in the back of an ice-cream truck in "Special Delivery". Bobby's equivalent is Toby Duncan, played by Logan Moreau.

=== Recurring ===
- Tanya Abrol as Parminder "Pam" Amarjeet Kaur Dhillon: Dolly's best friend. Pam's equivalent is Ivy Wentz, played by Raven Goodwin.
- Yash Mittall as Popi: Rohan's best friend. He has a desperate one-sided crush on Dolly. Popi's equivalent is Emmett, played by Micah Stephen Williams.
- Sulakshana Rohini Khatri as Roli Aunty: Singhs' Neighbor; Riya's grandmother. Roli Aunty's equivalent is Mrs. Dabney, played by Patricia Belcher.
- Shaheer Sheikh as Ritesh: Dolly's former love interest. She breaks up with him after he cheats on her. He is based on Spencer Walsh, played by Shane Harper in Good Luck Charlie.
- Kishan Savjani as Rahul Chopra: Dolly's former love interest. She initially did not like him and used to call him "Rakshas Rahul" in season 1 but they eventually start dating, but have broken up by season three. He is also based on the Good Luck Charlie character Spencer Walsh.
- Abhishek Sharma as Ayaan: Dolly's colleague and love interest. They broke up when Ayaan moved to go to college in Mumbai, but later get back together when Dolly also moves to Mumbai. He is based on the Good Luck Charlie character Spencer Walsh, played by Shane Harper..
- Ahsaas Channa as Riya Gill: Roli's granddaughter; Sunny's love interest. In Good Luck Charlie Riya's equivalent is Lauren Dabney, who is played by Jaylen Barron.
- Saniya Anklesaria as Guri Malhotra: Sunny's friend who always threatened to beat him up in season 1. Dolly had to go to Sunny's school but it didn't work and Dolly got beaten up too. She also appears in the last season, making fun of Sunny. Guri's 'Good Luck Charlie' equivalent is Jo Keener, played by G. Hannelius.
- Fatima Sana Shaikh as Richa Shenoy: Rohan's girlfriend
- Faezeh Jalali as Tina: the gym instructor
- Sharib Hashmi as Partha sir
- Tara Sutaria as Nina / Tina (Double Role)
- Baby Farida as Bua ma, Avatar Singh's aunt
- Reem Shaikh as Sanya
- Kavi Kumar Azad as Jaanbaz Jaadugar

== Episode list ==
| Series | Episodes | Originally released | |
| Series | Episodes | First released | Last released |
|---|---|---|---|
| 1 | 26 + 2 specials | 3 April 2011 | 8 March 2012 |
| 2 | 30 + 2 specials | 3 June 2012 | 1 January 2013 |
| 3 | 23 + 1 special | 7 July 2013 | 8 December 2013 |
| 4 | 24 + 1 special | 2 August 2015 | 16 April 2016 |

=== Season 1 (2011–2012) ===
Season one of Best of Luck Nikki started airing on Disney Channel India on 3 April 2011 with the episode "Study Date". The season ended with the airing of the "Happy Holi!" special on 8 March 2012.

| No. overall | No. in season | Title |
|---|---|---|
| 1 | 1 | "Study Date" |
Dolly moves her study date with a cute boy, Ritesh, from the library to home because she has to help Avatar take care of Nikki when Himani goes back to work. Avatar injures himself falling down the stairs, so Rohan has to take him to the hospital where Himani works, leaving Dolly to watch Nikki.
| 2 | 2 | "Baby Come Back!" |
Dolly encourages her parents to go out while the kids take care of the baby. Rohan flirts with a cute girl, Punam (Shivani Joshi), while minding Nikki and accidentally brings the wrong baby home. After a failed search, the kids go to tell their parents at a restaurant and find Nikki sitting with the cute girl's family a few tables over.
| 3 | 3 | "Narendra Tauji – A Cricket Freak" |
Dolly finds she has an Narendra Tauji (English: uncle) her father doesn't speak of; she visits him and they go to a cricket game, where she realizes why they never got along. Sunny and Rohan try to make money modelling Nikki for a baby store ad.
| 4 | 4 | "Dinku the Donkey" |
Himani pressures Dolly to be in the school play, Dinku the Donkey, and she gets the part despite trying to blow the audition. A baby basketball match is set between Nikki and Popi's nephew Himen.
| 5 | 5 | "Up a Tree!" |
Roli Aunty agrees to bring her dog inside if Avatar cuts down a tree, but Dolly and Rohan stage a sit-in to save their childhood treehouse. Avatar wages war against his disobedient kids while Himani gives them her support.
| 6 | 6 | "The Curious Case of Mr. Surinder" |
Dolly is annoyed that her best friend Pam has become "texting buddies" with Himani, so she attempts to bond with Pam's boring mother. Sunny and Rohan investigate when they mistakenly believe that Roli Aunty has killed her husband.
| 7 | 7 | "Nikki Did It!" |
Nikki sets off a shoplifting alarm at a drugstore, and she, Sunny, and Dolly are put in holding. Neeti, an awkward girl from Dolly's school, works there and aids their escape. Rohan and Popi create a jingle for an Avatar Bijlee Company commercial.
| 8 | 8 | "Dance Off" |
Dolly asks Ritesh to the school dance on a double date with Pam and Popi. The boys start a "dance-off" over Dolly, but end up bonding, leaving Dolly feeling left out. Sunny tries to get Himani and Avatar to fight at his PTM to maintain his excuse for not doing homework.
| 9 | 9 | "Boys Meet Girls" |
Rohan delivers food for Kukkad Nukkad (a chicken restaurant) and falls for a customer, Richa, who he obsesses over, causing friction with Popi. Avatar used to date Richa's mom, which causes trouble with Himani. Dolly tries to help Sunny with a school bully, Guri. Guest: Fatima Sana Shaikh as Richa Shenoy.
| 10 | 10 | "Nikki is 1!" |
On Nikki's birthday, the family reminisce about her birth, which was three weeks early and a scramble to get to the hospital. Avatar and Rohan found a gorilla sleeping in their car and befriend farmers for a ride. Home alone, Sunny has the best unsupervised day of his life until Roli Aunty takes him to the hospital. Dolly and Pam, in full costume for a kids' play, track down Himani's doctor at his son's birthday party.
| 11 | 11 | "Billi Butterfly The Cat" |
Dolly cat-sits for Roli Aunty, whose sister enlists a cat therapist to cheer up the pet. Sunny tells a girl he likes that he's an only child living with his single mother (to have things in common with her) and enlists Dolly into helping him maintain the facade when she shows up at their busy home.
| 12 | 12 | "Dolly's Little Helper" |
Dolly tries to impress her Hindi teacher by bringing Nikki to class in costumes for a presentation, but Nikki vomits on the teacher and makes the class sick as well. Himani stands in for Avatar as Sunny's football coach, and they win their first game ever; the team hire her but her "have fun" approach doesn't work as well the next game. Meanwhile, Rohan takes Nikki to Nani ghar and bonds with the Nani moms.
| 13 | 13 | "Chunni Go Bye-Bye" |
The kids throw a surprise anniversary dinner for their parents, but Nikki loses her blankie and won't stop crying. Chaos ensues as Rohan gets locked out of the house with Nikki inside. Meanwhile Sunny takes Avtaar and Himani to the movies but Himani gets stuck watching Robot No: 1, a movie she hates.
| 14 | 14 | "Nikki goes Viral" |
Rohan makes a viral video of Nikki farting; this attracts the local news where Himani seizes the spotlight and Avatar tries to promote his business. Dolly meets Ritesh's parents and loves their tidy and quiet house, while in contrast they see the chaotic Farty Nikki newscast.
| 15 | 15 | "Singhs's Got Talent" |
After agreeing to do a routine for the community talent show, Ritesh sees how bad a dancer Dolly is and fakes an injury. Popi abandons a ventriloquist act with Rohan to partner with Dolly, resulting in chaos at the show. Guri convinces Sunny she wants to help him run for class monitor, but instead smears him to bolster her own campaign.
| 16 | 16 | "Kukkad Nukkad" |
Dolly becomes the new spokesmodel for Kukkad Nukkad which seems like the perfect job until she realizes how much Rohan wanted the role. Avatar endeavours to capture a mouse and Sunny tries to prank him. Himani takes Nikki to a Mummy & Me class and gets over-competitive with another mother.
| 17 | 17 | "Girl Bites Dog" |
Dolly worries about her relationship with Ritesh after Nikki bites his finger and later Dolly discovers him with another girl, Maya. She dumps him after he lies about it. Sunny tricks Rohan into an unfavourable contract for money to buy an old used car. To teach him a lesson, Himani, Avatar and Rohan try to convince Sunny that the car is haunted.
| 18 | 18 | "Butt-Dialing Singhs" |
Dolly flatters Himani as a "cool mom" so she can attend a midnight movie with Pam, but Himani overhears it was an act. Himani and Pam's mom get revenge by publicly embarrassing the girls. Rohan pocket-dials his intimidating lab partner, Sandy, who overhears how stupid Rohan thinks he is. Sunny and Avatar assemble Sunny's new toy helicopter, while Sunny is driven crazy by Nikki's new toy "Bak Bak Bandar".
| 19 | 19 | "Dolly's Broken Heart Band" |
Recovering from her breakup, Dolly befriends Maya and with Pam they make a music video about Ritesh, however when he stops by to apologize Dolly decides to not upload it. Rohan and Sunny clash over sharing a room, and Sunny decides to sneak into the room Roli Aunty has kept for her son. Himani joins a gym with free babysitting but spends her time at a beauty parlour.
| 20 | 20 | "Dolly Rebounds" |
Kaustubh, a mature 11-year-old boy arrives in the neighbourhood and convinces Dolly to be his date to a cousin's birthday party. When she learns Ritesh has a new girlfriend, Sheena, Dolly says she is also dating but is caught out. Rohan and Popi add a third member to their band; when Nikki gets him sick, Avatar steps in to perform but takes his role too far.
| 21 | 21 | "Summer Vacation (Part 1)" |
A psychic tells Dolly she will become a film star during the family vacation, and she starts to believe it. Himani and Avatar discover they were never religiously married (the priest was a fraud) but Avatar doesn't want to abandon their planned ski vacation to correct the mistake. Rohan tumbles down a hill to a cabin with two beautiful teenaged girls, which seems like heaven until their seven-foot dad arrives.
| 22 | 22 | "Summer Vacation (Part 2)" |
Dolly is desperate to audition for a movie's heroine, she ends up stuck with Popi who is part of the film unit. Sunny and Rohan enter a tango competition to make money. Avatar tries to make up with Himani by planning a surprise wedding.
| 23 | 23 | "Nikki In Charge" |
Sunny and Guri must babysit Nikki while completing a school project. Dolly tricks a fearful Rohan into going to the dentist, but breaks her tooth in the process and is drooling and swollen for her school debate. Avatar tries to surprise Himani with a day spa but needs her help on an emergency extermination call.
| 24 | 24 | "Stolen Bike" |
When Nikki develops a habit of pushing buttons, Sunny blames her for leaving the garage door open and the theft of his bicycle – which he sold to his friend Shibu. Avatar investigates to catch Sunny in his lie. For film class, Dolly chooses to reenact her parents telling her they were expecting a baby. Himani gets involved and overdoes it, driving Dolly to say how she really felt at the time. Popi's new girlfriend seems to be hitting on Rohan, but she has an identical twin. Guest:- Tara Sutaria in double role as Nina and Tina.
| 25 | 25 | "Sleepless in Delhi" |
Dolly prepares to audition for the school play but Nikki draws in ink all over her face. Nikki refuses to sleep in her first "big girl" bed. Sunny has his first sleepover in a backyard tent, under which the lawn sprinklers go off. Rohan eats too much kebab and has nightmares of becoming fat.
| 26 | 26 | "Dolly's Birthday" |
Avatar won't take Dolly to practise driving so she drives Roli Aunty around. They run out of gas then get stuck in the mud, so Dolly comes home a mess and walks into a surprise 17th birthday party. Sunny brings home a huge dog that Himani doesn't want in the house until she realizes it's gentle, she's heartbroken when the dog's rightful owner collects it.
| Season Special No. 1 | Season 1 Special | "Happy Diwali!" |
The Singhs decide to go for a Diwali vacation to Udaipur but have numerous transportation difficulties involving a milk van, a missed train, and an errant flight. They decide to return home and Himani becomes upset with Avatar, but they discover their house decorated with lights by Pam and Popi as a surprise to cheer up Dolly. They all celebrate Diwali.
| Season Special No. 2 | Season 1 Special | "Happy Holi!" |
On the day of Holi, Avatar learns that a very special business person is visiting their house to arrange a business deal. He tells Himani to send kids away so that his deal won't be affected by them, but everything turns out to be the opposite.

=== Season 2 (2012) ===
The second season of Best of Luck Nikki started airing on Disney Channel India on 3 June 2012 with the episode "Let's Potty". The season ended with the airing of "Happy New Year!" (special) on 1 January 2013.

| No. overall | No. in season | Title |
|---|---|---|
| 27 | 1 | "Let's Potty" |
Himani is desperately trying to potty train Nikki before an exclusive preschool interview. As the Singhs try to cope without power and water, Rohan and Sunny run an extension cord to Roli Aunty's house for their electronics. Pam is unable to video chat with Jatin, a cute boy she likes, so Dolly invites them both to her house despite Pam's extreme anxiety.
| 28 | 2 | "Nikki is 2!" |
The Singh family are jailed on Nikki's 2nd birthday after a series of mishaps. Dolly, Sunny, and Nikki are caught sneaking into a Super Subzi concert after being unable to buy or win tickets. Rohan is arrested for persistently trying to get Super Subzi members to hear his songs. Avatar gets a miniature donkey for Nikki's birthday party but it was stolen property.
| 29 | 3 | "The Sea World" |
To pay her cell phone bill, Dolly takes a miserable job at an ocean-themed children's party place. She gets stuck in a crawl tube and Avatar gets stuck trying to free her. Rohan uses Nikki to approach cute girls, but his new interest Priya only cares about Nikki. Himani becomes obsessed with a Wii-like video game and Sunny decides to throw a match to avoid playing with her.
| 30 | 4 | "Singh vs Singh" |
Dolly and Rohan throw a house party while their parents plan an overnight trip, but it is thrown into jeopardy when Avatar and Himani get into a fight. Guri invites Sunny to take "stupid" grooming classes with her, and Himani forces him to go.
| 31 | 5 | "Dancing Singhs" |
Himani tries to get the family in a big musical number for the annual hospital charity gala, but replaces them when they prove uncooperative. Dolly suspects that Pam went to a popular girl's party behind her back, and questions Pam during a mock trial at school. Sunny ropes Rohan into helping him sell random junk online.
| 32 | 6 | "Aliens vs Animals" |
Dolly is invited to the park by Gaurav, a boy she likes. She assumes it is a picnic date but turns out to be a live-action role-playing group and she plays along in costume. Avatar wins an electrician award but forgets to thank Himani in his acceptance speech, Rohan helps him recreate the moment on video with a speech dedicated to his wife, who was not present. Himani visits the hospital when Nikki pokes her in the eye, and fakes pain so she won't have to leave.
| 33 | 7 | "News Reporter Dolly" |
Trying to gain an internship with the local news, Dolly enlists Sunny and Rohan to go undercover for a hard-hitting exposé about a theatre employee who takes bribes to let kids into PG-13 movies. Rohan tries to make peace with Darpan, whose ponytail he cut off when they were 5 years old. Nikki ruins an expensive pair of shoes Himani was going to return.
| 34 | 8 | "Fake Phone Call" |
Dolly and Pam trick their mothers into thinking each other gave permission for the girls to go to a party. When Sunny blows their plan, the girls have to think fast to avoid being caught. Rohan fills-in at Avatar's business when he is bitten by a spider, and is dismayed that his father describes him as "nice". Nikki pesters Sunny until he will play with her.
| 35 | 9 | "Battle of the Bands" |
Dolly and Maya compete against Rohan and Popi at a mall's Super Band competition, where Rahul is favoured to win. Rohan and Maya become attracted to each other and combine their bands to try and take the prize. Sunny makes a wealthy friend who gives him an old MyTab, Avatar goes to return it but ends up hanging out with the dad and enjoying the benefits of the family's wealth. Himani joins an art class where she is considered terrible until she submits one of Nikki's paintings.
| 36 | 10 | "Himani VS Paghmare Sir" |
Dolly snaps at a teacher for refusing to correct an unfairly marked test, and matters become worse when Himani steps in. Avatar takes Nikki to a ballet class where he ends up participating. Popi coaches Rohan to tell Maya's ex-boyfriend – who happens to be captain of the wrestling team – to stop texting her.
| 37 | 11 | "Meet the Parents" |
Sunny blackmails Dolly and Rohan to pose as his parents and get him out of trouble with his nearsighted teacher. The teacher later sees Dolly on a date with Kunal and goes to the Singhs's house to let "Mr. Singh" know his wife isn't being faithful, only to find Rohan there on a date with Maya. Meanwhile, Avatar bets Himani that she can't build a playhouse for Nikki by herself.
| 38 | 12 | "Sunny's 12 1/2 Birthday" |
Sunny promises to be good for a whole week so his parents will throw him a birthday party (his 12th birthday party had been continually cancelled for months). He manages it but the day of his party there is a huge storm; the family pull together to create a fun birthday party at home. Meanwhile, Dolly and Pam get into a big fight, they each decide to apologize and make up, and get stuck at each other's houses when the storm hits. Rohan tries to help Avatar get in shape through "Bollycise", an exercise program incorporating Bollywood dance.
| 39 | 13 | "The Break Up" |
Dolly loses interest in Kunal but delays breaking up because he keeps doing nice things for her. Himani volunteers as Sunny's hockey coach. She becomes competitive and forces Sunny to work harder and harder until he scores a great shot and knocks out a few of her teeth. Avatar accidentally gets Rohan fired from Kukkad Nukkad and has to find a way to get his son's job back.
| 40 | 14 | "Bear Banao Workshop" |
Dolly and Pam babysit for new neighbours. Pam convinces Dolly to try on the mom's diamond earrings and one gets lost in a stuffed toy, they have to get it back before its disappearance is discovered. Sunny gives Avatar a fake winning lottery ticket in the hopes of going to an amusement park, but Himani thinks they are rich and quits her job. Rohan meets Maya's intimidating father.
| 41 | 15 | "The Suite Life of Singh Sisters" |
Dolly, Himani and Nikki take a trip to Mumbai to visit their rich great-aunt, but are mistaken for dance duo the Singh Sisters and taken to the Hotel Raj Mahal. Himani goes through with the impersonation to fulfill her dream of being on TV, but at the last moment the real Singh Sisters arrive. Sunny and Rohan hold a yard sale to raise money while cleaning out the house, but sell a cookie jar with money in it to Roli Aunty. Avatar becomes obsessed with a TV show. NOTE:- This episode is a crossover with The Suite Life of Karan & Kabir.
| 42 | 16 | "Ditch Day" |
Dolly nervously ditches school to change her reputation for being a goody-goody. Rohan tries to make a dress for Nikki in home science class. Sunny tries to lift his punishment by bringing attention to a love poem from Himani's high school days, but it was not written by Avatar. In the end, Avatar writes her a love poem of his own.
| 43 | 17 | "Amazing Julie" |
Dolly buys Pam's father's old Scooty and he is devastated when it is wrecked. To give him closure, they hold a funeral to celebrate the life of the beloved vehicle. Himani is offended when Nikki isn't sad on her first day of preschool, and plans a special "Nikki and Mommy Day" so that she'll be really sad the next time they have to separate. Sunny and Rohan try to find a fishing buddy for Avatar so that they can avoid the annual fishing trip.
| 44 | 18 | "Avatar Beats" |
Sunny and his friend Shibu start a lemonade stand, but become competitors when they fight about the details. Dolly tries to find Popi a date for an upcoming dance in hopes that he will release her from a 7-year-old promise to go with him. Rohan gets Avatar's high school band back together but soon learns the reason they broke up: Himani.
| 45 | 19 | "Rohan in the City" |
Dolly applies for a job at an upscale store for a discount on cute school picture clothes. She tries an at-home spray-on tanner (which turns out to be a hair dye) that Rahul gave her to improve her appearance, but she ends up darker – and more orange – than intended. Maya's family move back to Mumbai and Rohan pursues her, Avatar finds him playing music at a bus stop and tries to convince him to break up with Maya for a while and come home. Himani meddles with Sunny, inviting a girl to their home but it isn't the one he likes.
| 46 | 20 | "Rat King" |
Dolly accompanies Avatar to the electrical convention, hoping he'll buy her a new Scooty. She puts on a giant rat costume to help with a presentation planned to bring down his rival, Wadwa. Sunny and a friend try to make a monster movie featuring Nikki. Popi drives Himani crazy with his bad habits.
| 47 | 21 | "Summer Vacation (Part 1)" |
The family take a trip celebrating Avatar and Himani's anniversary. Wandering onto sacred ground, Himani gets the family cursed. Himani is trapped in an elevator with a claustrophobic woman, Dolly gets knocked out during a surfing lesson; Rohan and Sunny's aerial tour pilot loses consciousness during their flight, Avatar gets knocked out by a golf ball, and Nikki goes missing. Meanwhile, Avatar faces continuous hour-long timeshare seminars.
| 48 | 22 | "Summer Vacation (Part 2)" |
Believing they are cursed, Himani gets severe allergic reactions. Dolly finds Nikki playing with a group of other children. Avatar asks Dolly to impersonate Himani for the timeshare seminar. After making a promise to God during his and Rohan's near-death experience, Sunny coaches Rohan to face his fears.
| 49 | 23 | "Oops" |
Pam's mother wins an audition to sing the national anthem at a game, but she gets stage fright and Dolly is forced to lip sync for her. Himani joins a social-networking site and is upset when her kids will not accept her friend requests. Avatar tries to win a bowling tournament but Sunny's hand gets stuck in a toy claw machine and they use Nikki to win.
| 50 | 24 | "Bye Bye Video Diary" |
Nikki puts a laptop into a bucket of water and it is ruined; believing they've lost all of the video diaries for Nikki, Himani and Dolly stay up all night re-recording them. However, when Rohan returns from Kukkad Nukkad University, he apologizes for taking her laptop by mistake. Sunny takes over Rohan's room while he is away, but when he watches a horror movie he is terrified and refuses to let Nikki sleep in her own room.
| 51 | 25 | "Scary Dolly" |
A boy next door scares Nikki, so Dolly and Pam decide to get revenge. Sunny agrees to watch Roli Aunty's house, but it is trashed and he has to do whatever she says. Rohan affects a goth subculture style for his new girlfriend. Avatar and Himani dress as each other for Halloween.
| 52 | 26 | "Story Time" |
Dolly and Himani discover that a mom at Nikki's book club is a children's book publisher, and they each try to write the next big hit. Avatar is a smash at career day until a snake gets loose in Sunny's class. Rohan starts giving out relationship advice to his Kukkad Nukkad customers.
| 53 | 27 | "Return to Super Adventure Land" |
While on a family trip to an amusement park, Sunny and Himani are approached to do a commercial. Himani takes the role too seriously and tries to rewrite it to give herself a bigger part. Dolly gets a job at the park as a princess to Popi's frog prince, requiring her to hug him at every show. Initially upset, she starts to wonder if she's more interested than she realized. Avatar encourages Rohan to pursue cooking, at the expense of his schoolwork.
| 54 | 28 | "It's Avatar Singh's Birthday" |
Himani has time to cook Avatar's birthday dinner, but he convinces Rohan to do as much of the cooking as possible so the meal will be edible. Dolly and Pam plan to stand in line at the Gizmo Hut to get cheap MyTabs when they go on sale, but she is caught by a cooking mishap while trying to sneak out of the house. Avatar's dad visits and falls for Roli Aunty, who joins the Singhs for the birthday dinner while announcing her divorce; Avatar and Sunny panic and try to prevent them from becoming a couple.
| 55 | 29 | "Dolly on Hill" |
Himani and Avatar investigate how Nikki learnt a bad word. Dolly goes with Pam to her family's cabin on the lake, only to discover it's a single cramped room where the whole family is stuck for the weekend. Rohan and Sunny break Roli Aunty's dish antenna and have to invite her over to watch her daily soaps until it is fixed.
| 56 | 30 | "Can You Keep A Secret ?" |
Dolly discovers she has feelings for Rahul while working together at the amusement park. However, her parents buy her a Scooty so that she can quit. Rohan asks for his birth certificate for a school trip, and finds out that his official name is Rohini – because of Avatar's poor handwriting – and his parents never got around to fixing the error. Sunny is collecting cans for money, and Avatar doesn't believe it's for a new video game system.
| Season Special No. 3 | Season 2 Special | "Happy New Year!" |
Himani and Dolly go to Jaipur for an audition but are stuck under curfew. Himani's parents visit and find the house a mess in her absence; they phone Himani, telling her that Nikki is missing, and Himani panics and sneaks out of the hotel. They seek a ride from a man with a car but he is a car thief and all three are arrested. Himani gets a police uniform and takes Dolly in a police van to return home. Nikki is found and the family reunited, but the police come to arrest Himani. She explains her reasons and reveals that she is pregnant, and they let her go. Avatar and the others are anxious about having a fifth child in the family.
| Season Special No. 4 | Season 2 Special | "Best of Luck Karan And Kabir" |
Avatar takes his family to Raj Mahal Hotel while having some work there. While working, a current cut off happens in hotel and Dolly, Himani, Sunny and Rohan get stuck in the elevator. Meanwhile, Rohan and Sunny plan for a prank in hotel. Same situation happens with Karan and Kabir. NOTE:- This is a crossover episode of Best of Luck Nikki and The Suite Life of Karan & Kabir, which premiered on 27 March 2013 on the event of Holi.

=== Season 3 (2014) ===
The third season of Best of Luck Nikki started airing on Disney Channel India on 7 July 2013 with the episode "Make Room for Baby". The season ended with the airing of "All Fall Down" on 8 December 2013.

| No. overall | No. in season | Title |
|---|---|---|
| 57 | 1 | "Make Room for Baby" |
With a fifth Singh child on the way, Himani demands a larger house. Dolly and Ayaan audition for Romeo and Juliet at their college, Ayaan gets the lead opposite of a school trustee's daughter who has a crush on him. Sunny and Roli Aunty pull an escalating series of pranks to see who gets the last laugh. When the family is almost done packing, Himani reminisces and tells Avatar that she wants the family to stay at the house.
| 58 | 2 | "Bad Luck Dolly" |
The basketball team blame their losing streak on Dolly and Ayaan's relationship, so they fake a breakup in hopes the team will relax. Sunny starts acting on his best behaviour when he thinks his parents are considering sending him to a boarding school, a misunderstanding they do nothing to clear up.
| 59 | 3 | "Himani Needs a Shower" |
Himani convinces Pam's mom to throw her a baby shower, but the shower takes an unexpected twist when Nikki blurts out all the horrible things Himani said about her guests, making them angrily leave. Rohan and Sunny compete to go to a cricket match with Avatar.
| 60 | 4 | "Triplet Trouble" |
Dolly makes an excuse to go to a graduation party with Ayaan. Rohan asks the flower delivery girl as his date, and she also asks him out to her graduation party which is at her parents' house as she is learning through correspondence. Avatar goes to the doctor for a check-up and overhears the doctor speaking about another patient named Singh.
| 61 | 5 | "Catch Me If You Can" |
Himani overhears through the baby monitor that Dolly and Ayann have been secretly rehearsing the play Dinku the Donkey!. Dolly got the lead role and did not want Himani to steal the spotlight. In the end, Himani stands in for a cast member who broke a leg. Meanwhile, Avatar desperately wants to fix a fuse in a gorilla cage to prove to Sunny that he's cool.
| 62 | 6 | "Name That Baby" |
Himani and Avtaar vote on baby names for the fifth Singh child. Dolly is eager to find a quiet place to study for her final exam. The parents overhear Sunny expressing anxiety about being forgotten when a new baby is born, and try to make up for lost time that they did not spend with Sunny.
| 63–64 | 7–8 | "Special Delivery" |
The baby is one week overdue, upsetting Himani's mood. Dolly tries to help her by inducing labor, but Himani does not want the new child born on Nikki's birthday and overshadowing her. Avatar, Sunny and Rohan shop for a new family car but their purchase does not fit inside the garage. Sunny is sent to buy Nikki a doll for her birthday but forgets. Nikki's birthday invitations may not have been mailed, and so Sunny and Rohan dress up as princesses in order to entertain her. Himani goes into labour and they hitchhike to the hospital on an ice-cream truck. On the way, Himani gives birth to their baby boy, Bobby Singh.
| 65 | 9 | "Welcome Bua Maa" |
Avatar's aunt visits to help with Bobby, but drives Himani so crazy that she asks Dolly to keep the woman away. In a box of old things Roli Aunty gave them, Sunny and Rohan find an unmailed letter claiming money is buried in her backyard. They dig at the exact location mentioned, unwittingly excavating for her new mini-pool. To pay her back they put green dye in the mini-pool.
| 66 | 10 | "Baby's First Vacation" |
The family take a vacation to an old mansion, and quickly become convinced that it is haunted. It turns out that they are on a prank TV show. Dolly pretends to be sick and throws a house party while the rest of the family is gone. Roli Aunty blows their cover so they make a deal, but her parents eventually find out.
| 67 | 11 | "Tricycle Race" |
Sunny begins to like a girl at school and tries to convince her that he has a soft side. At the park, Rohan and Popi decide to have another baby race, this time using tricycles.
| 68 | 12 | "Baby in Air" |
Rohan announces that he is moving into an apartment with Popi to be closer to college, Himani is heartbroken and not ready for such a big change. Meanwhile, Sunny discovers that Avatar is afraid of carrying Bobby up and down the staircase after he dropped Nikki years ago.
| 69 | 13 | "Project Rocket" |
Sunny tricks Himani into building a model rocket for his science class. Avatar enjoys peaceful quiet at Rohan's apartment since the Singh household has recently become loud and annoying.
| 70 | 14 | "Pass that Baby" |
Himani returns to work at the end of her maternity leave and finds her boss is divorced and working as well. Himani has hallucinations of Nikki and Bobby. Sunny and Rohan watch over Nikki but she runs away. Meanwhile, Dolly attends the mock parliamentary session alongside Ravi; Bobby nearly causes them to lose due to his frequent crying, but they soothe him by singing their final presentation, which leads them to victory. Himani decides to become a stay-at-home mom, and Avatar child-proofs all the locks so Nikki cannot run away.
| 71 | 15 | "Team Mom" |
Dolly's team is on a losing streak, so new team assistant coach, Himani, hosts a team-bonding slumber party in the hopes that they will work together to win a game. Meanwhile, Sunny starts dating a new girl named Sanya and Avatar immediately becomes annoyed by her father because he is clingy and has horrible manners.
| 72 | 16 | "Ladkiology Expert" |
Ayaan goes to apologize after getting into an argument with Dolly, but instead gets advice from Avatar on how to handle a Singh woman as a "Ladkiology expert". Himani overhears and instructs Dolly how to handle the situation. In the end, Ayaan apologizes. Meanwhile, Sunny avoids chores by spending the weekend with his friend Shibu at Rohan's apartment.
| 73 | 17 | "Nurse Batra" |
Sunny is just gaining popularity when Himani gets a part-time nursing job at his school. They agree to pretend not to know each other, and she uses her maiden name, Batra. Meanwhile, Rohan has to babysit Nikki and Bobby, and begins a babysitting service with Popi.
| Season Special No. 5 | Season 3 Special | "Diwali Special" |
The Singh family goes out to celebrate Diwali but Sunny and Rohan get lost in the forest and the family has to find the boys. Mishaps and adventures follow.
| 74 | 18 | "Fancy Dress Party" |
Himani throws a party to entertain Nikki and Bobby, dressing in a kangaroo costume with a pouch for her two youngest children. Avatar puts a cape on over his work clothes and calls himself Super Bijlee Man, but Himani disapproves of his meagre efforts. Meanwhile, Sunny is deceived by Roli Aunty into attending a ceremony in honour of her charitable work.
| 75 | 19 | "Sunny's Homework" |
Pam is directing a community theatre play, and Dolly pressures her to cast Nikki in the lead despite Nikki failing the audition. A boy calls Avatar Nikki and Bobby's grandpa, leading him to attempt a youthful makeover. Sunny does a school report on a neighbour with a fantastic job, and makes Rohan pose as the person for extra credit.
| 76 | 20 | "A Singh Wedding Anniversary" |
Avatar's aunt returns once again to celebrate his wedding anniversary, much to Himani's dismay. Things go awry when Himani and the aunt learn they are performing the same act at the talent show. Elsewhere, Avatar struggles to find the perfect gift for Himani.
| 77 | 21 | "Study Buddy" |
Dolly wants to ace a statistics test, and asks Saahil to coach her since he earned a perfect score. She quickly regrets this due to his strict and demanding teaching methods. Meanwhile, Avatar's snoring is keeping Bobby awake at night, so Himani makes him sleep with Sunny.
| 78–79 | 22–23 | "All Fall Down" |
Avatar shows Himani unleashes a rare species of termite which gets loose in the house. Himani starts contributing to Teen Today Blog under Dolly's name. Sunny tries to find a new room for himself after Bobby moves into his room. The termites ultimately destroy the entire house and the Singhs move into a hotel. Rohan announces that he's dropped out of college, but wants to attend catering college.

=== Season 4 (2015–2016) ===
A first look at Best of Luck Nikki season four was revealed in the Goldie Ahuja Matric Pass crossover episode "Happy Father's Day!" (aired on 21 June 2015). Season four of Best of Luck Nikki was the final season of the series, started airing on Disney Channel India on 2 August 2015 and was slightly different from Good Luck Charlie, as Himani was shown pregnant with a sixth child. Gurdip Kohli was actually pregnant while shooting season four and the cast and crew revealed that they took special care of her while shooting. Season four aired on 2 August 2015 with "Singh's Dream House" and concluded on 16 April 2016 with "Bye Bye Nikki".

| No. overall | No. in season | Title |
|---|---|---|
| 80 | 1 | "Singh's Dream House" |
Himani wants a new house, their dream house, but Dolly and Nikki's dream makes them repair the new house. Meanwhile, Popi and Rohan want to live in a new home.
| 81 | 2 | "The Extravagant Couch" |
Avatar and Sunny buy an extravagant new couch, much to Himani's dismay. Rohan starts his first day at catering college and becomes the butt of his teacher's jokes.
| 82 | 3 | "Demolition Roli" |
Dolly has a Mumbai University interview lined up and Himani decides to cover it on Khabardaar Tv as her segment. Sunny has a crush on Roli Aunty's granddaughter, Ria.
| 83 | 4 | "Mishap at the Park" |
Rohan and Sunny take Bobby to the park where a bet leads to Rohan getting stuck in the baby swing. Avatar tries to get around Nikki's pre-school guidelines which prohibit him from wearing bathrobe when dropping off Nikki.
| 84 | 5 | "Rock Enroll" |
Dolly struggles to write an essay about her life for college enrolment. A student from Sunny's elementary school asks for his advice on pranking a teacher. Rohan reluctantly goes with Avatar to a Bandar Bana Macho (BBM) Concert.
| 85 | 6 | "Sunny's Legal Guardian" |
Himani and Kaamini argue about who has been teaching their daughters rude language and come to realise the bad influence is Roli Aunty. Sunny convinces Rohan to pretend to be his legal guardian, to avoid showing their parents his report card.
| 86 | 7 | "Doppel Date" |
Rohan is unenthusiastic about reading Nikki her favourite book, but instantly gets hooked with the story. Dolly decides to date again but her new guy looks very much like her ex, Ayaan. Avatar goes clothes shopping with Sunny and accidentally buys him a girl's shirt, causing Sunny embarrassment at school. To prove it doesn't matter what other people think, Avatar wears a girl shirt himself but then finds out he has a company meeting that day.
| 87 | 8 | "Rat-A-Dolly" |
Dolly throws a sleepover at Rohan's apartment, while Rohan and Popi take care of their neighbor's pet rat. One of Avatar's employees quits to start his own business, so Avatar hires a teenager named Aavishkaar as a replacement. Himani and Roli Aunty use Sunny and Riya to trick each other to do their chores but the tables turn when the children find out.
| 88 | 9 | "Bobby in Ad" |
Rohan and his catering college classmate Vinnie have a misunderstanding. Sunny and his friend use Bobby's face for advertising; to avoid family finding out they sign another contract to act in an advertisement for a Dhaaba as girls.
| 89 | 10 | "Nikki 5, Bobby 2" |
Himani goes overboard with Nikki's birthday party. Dolly answers the phone at Avatar's company and helps Aavishkaar to break up with his long-distance girlfriend. Sunny is sent home from school after accidentally getting into a fight and gains a reputation as the tough guy in school.
| 90 | 11 | "Dolly's New Aavishkaar" |
Aavishkaar cons and takes Dolly out where she tries to prove that she is not boring by dancing in Rajasthani style. Rohan stains the new sofa whilst in charge of the kids at home leading to panic.
| 91 | 12 | "Dolly's Choice" |
The family and Aavishkaar celebrate Dolly's 21st birthday party, but Ayaan shows up and confesses that he has feelings for Dolly, which pressures her into choosing between Ayaan and Aavishkaar. In the end, Dolly chooses Aavishkaar because her relationship with Ayaan was too difficult. Rohan's cooking instructor pretends to enjoy everything Rohan does in order to get a good review on a teacher evaluation.
| 92 | 13 | "High Voltage Party" |
Missing an artists association function due to Himani's pregnancy, Avatar hosts the party at their home. Rohan caters for the event. Dolly is glad she doesn't have to attend until Aavishkaar asks her. The night takes a turn for the worse when Aavishkaar's aunt turns out to be a former hospital co-worker Himani can't stand; they have an argument that turns into a food fight. Meanwhile, Sunny gets movie tickets but Riya has gone out with her family so he reluctantly takes Roli Aunty instead, and they get kicked out of the theatre due to her loud talking.
| 93 | 14 | "Avatar's Aavishkaar Gone" |
Just as Avatar and Aavishkaar become closer, Aavishkaar gets a job offer in his hometown of Ahmedabad and has to say goodbye to Dolly and Avatar. Rohan and Popi search for a new roommate to share their household expenses. Sunny tries to get Himani's much-delayed news segment on the air, so she will stop intruding on his time with Riya.
| Season Special No. 6 | Season 4 Special | "Happy Diwali" |
On account of Diwali, the Singhs decorate their house like the palace but it turns out to get disastrous results. NOTE:-There was a three-month break after which the season resumed.
| 94 | 15 | "Sunny-Riya Breakup!" |
Riya wants to talk to Sunny about their relationship, and Dolly suggests she might want to break up. Sunny does what she says and breaks up with Sunny. But at last, Dolly manages everything. Someone is repeatedly throwing eggs on the cars in the neighborhood of the Singhs, so Daisy Aunty, Menon Uncle, Avatar, Rohan, and Kamini form a group called 'Shastri Nagar Padosi Police' to investigate who is the Andebaaz and with effort, Daisy Aunty tells that she has done the hazard.
| 95 | 16 | "Go Dolly!" |
Dolly gives audition for dance competition happening in Singapore, but later she finds out that competition is in Singrampur. Meanwhile, Avatar's finds his business in loss and not going well. Then, Rohan helps him out.
| 96 | 17 | "Fright Night" |
On a Amavasya night, Sunny and Rohan get scared by Rohan's neighbor. Ravi accidentally falls into a manhole while acting for Dolly, and Dolly and Pam use this as an opportunity to finish her Journalism assignment.
| 97 | 18 | "Sunny's Play" |
Sunny is playing a role secretly without telling Himani and when Himani finds out about it she insist on coming to the play and she ruins it. Dolly and Pam decide what to do on their last days together and they plan on doing shopping. Daisy Aunt, the Singhs' neighbor was getting married with Menon Uncle but Daisy aunty did not know cooking. Dolly and Rohan helped her to manage.
| 98 | 19 | "Accepted" |
Dolly is on the wait list for her first choice for her future college. Meanwhile, Avtar goes to Nikki's school to tell jokes.
| 99 | 20 | "Dolly's Bad Luck" |
Dolly has bad luck since everyone thinks she is promiscuous. Meanwhile Sunny and Avatar impersonate Arun and Varun Shastri to get into a restaurant, and get into trouble when the actual people come.
| 100 | 21 | "Happy New Year" |
Rohan and Dolly go to Mumbai Film Institute before New Year and meanwhile they couldn't celebrate it as Rohan went to a vada pav shop and became the chef.
| 101 | 22 | "Final Project" |
Rohan gets a cooking project and Dolly and Neeti get a reporting project but both of them forget to submit their work to Aaram Radio. Meanwhile, by mistake Rohan takes Nikki's drawing project cook institute. Dolly and Neeti get bored at the station and soon gets duty to dictate. Dolly and Neeti just rock-and-roll. The director sees them and throws them out of the station. Meanwhile, Nikki goes to Rohan's institute and tells chef that Rohan had done a mistake and should give one more chance. At last, Neeti, Rohan and Dolly gets passed in projects somehow.
| 102 | 23 | "The Tree House Mystery" |
Himani suspiciously starts to produce lovely dishes, paying Rohan to let her take the credit. Sunny learns that Rohan and Popi were evicted for not paying their rent and are staying in the treehouse. Avatar learns of this and agrees to pay.
| 103 | 24 | "Bye Bye Nikki" |
Dolly and Ayan get together. Rohan's friend is selling a food truck and he buys it and starts to do a job there to get money so he can get his apartment back and still go to college. Sunny helps Roli aunty get rid of her new neighbour. Himani gets a chance to be on a TV interview. Dolly tries to make the last video diary ever because she is leaving for college soon. Roli aunty is happy to know that sunny wont be annoying her anymore but just in that scene we get a clue that Bobby is the next naughty one of the family. Himani gives birth to Kritika aka Kookie, and finally gets a chance to be on TV as a star. Her dreams come true and their last video diary is shot by Nikki, where she says "Best of luck Kookie!!".
