= Sunil Singh =

Sunil Singh may refer to:

- Sunil Singh (cricketer) (born 1987), Indian cricketer
- Sunil Singh (politician), Indian politician, member of the West Bengal Legislative Assembly
- Chaudhary Sunil Singh, national president of Lok Dal, a political party
- Sunil Singh Yadav (AKA Sunil Singh Sajan, born 1981), Indian politician, member of Legislative Council from Lucknow-Unnao 2016-2022
- Gurvinder Sihra (born 1984), professional wrestler known as Sunil Singh

== See also ==
- Sunny Singh (disambiguation)
