= Sulakshana Khatri =

Indian actress

- Occupation: Actor
- Years active: 1987–present

Sulakshana Khatri is an Indian actress who mainly works in television serials. She is mainly known for playing Mandavi in Ramayan and Rollie Aunty in Best Of Luck Nikki.

== Filmography ==
=== Films ===
- Abu Kaliya (1990)
- Meera Dataar (1999)
- Angaar: The Fire (2002)
- Krishna Aur Kans (2012) as Putna (voice role)
- The Last Rights (2020) (Short)

=== Television ===
Year	Serial	Role	Notes
1987-1988	Ramayan	Mandavi	
1989	Bharat Ek Khoj	Shurpanakha	
1993	Shri Krishna	Rohini	
1993	Dekh Bhai Dekh	Suzie (The Aerobics Teacher)	
1993-1997	Alif Laila	Various characters	
2002	Hello Inspector	Shivani Lal	
2007	Babul Ki Bitiya Chali Doli Saja Ke	Kanta	
2009	Sapna Babul Ka... Bidaai	Dadi Bua	
2008	Grihasti	Teji	
2009-2011	Tere Mere Sapne	Maaji	
2011-2016	Best of Luck Nikki	Rollie Aunty	
2012-2014	The Suite Life of Karan & Kabir	Shobha ji	
2015	Goldie Ahuja Matric Pass	Twinkle Mam	
2016	Jaana Na Dil Se Door	Indumati Kashyap	
2019-2020	Kullfi Kumarr Bajewala		
2020	Sanjivani	NV's Grandmother	
2020	Maharaj Ki Jai Ho!	Mandakini	
2026	Lakshmi Niwas	Janaki	
