= Saloni Daini =

Indian actress and comedian (born 2001)

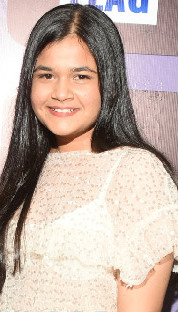
- Daini in 2020
- Born: 2000 or 2001 (age 23–24); Sangli, Maharashtra, India
- Occupations: Actress; stand up comedian
- Years active: 2007 – present

Saloni Daini (Born 19 Jun 2001, Sangil) is an Indian television actress and stand-up comedian, having started her career as a child actress. She is best known for playing the character Gangubai in various comedy TV shows. She is claimed to be one of the youngest comic stars on TV. She has faced the camera from the age of three, acting in Marathi serials and Marathi and Hindi films, and has released a music album for Disney. She also mimics film stars and politicians, and was seen in the promos of Shah Rukh Khan's Kya Aap Paanchvi Pass Se Tez Hain. In 2010, she appeared on Comedy Circus Mahasangram. She also featured in video series called Main 13 Hoon in June 2015 where among others, Saloni mimes Arnab Goswami pretty well along with Kajol and Sonam Kapoor.

== Career ==
Daini appeared in various Indian stand-up comedy TV shows as child comedian. She played a fictional maid, Gangubai, in many of her stand-up comedy shows and people recognize her as Gangubai.

== Filmography ==
=== Films ===
Year	Title	Role	Notes	Ref.
2007	Dum Kaata	Gauri	Debut film	—
2010	No Problem	Tuk Tuk	—	
2023	Thank You for Coming	Rabeya Das	—	

=== Television ===
Year	Title	Role	Notes
2009–2010	Comedy Circus	Contestant	
2013	Raavi	Cameo	
2015	Tedi Medi Family	Suhani Khurana	
2016	Bade Bhaiyya Ki Dulhania	Mona Pant	
2018	Namune	Kavya Agnihotri	
2019–2020	Yehh Jadu Hai Jinn Ka!	Farah Khan	
