= Sheena Bajaj =

Indian television actress

- Born: June 16, 1994 (age 32); Mumbai, Maharashtra, India
- Occupation: Actress
- Years active: 2001–2019; 2023–2024
- Known for: Best of Luck Nikki as Dolly Singh
- Spouse: Rohit Purohit (m. 2019)
- Children: 1

Sheena Bajaj (born 16 June 1994) is an Indian actress known for portraying Dolly Singh in the Disney channel sitcom Best of Luck Nikki. She has also worked in Jassi Jaissi Koi Nahi, Thapki Pyar Ki, and Khatmal E Ishq.

== Personal life ==
Bajaj was born into a Punjabi family in Mumbai on 16 June 1994. On 22 January 2019, she married Rohit Purohit after dating for six years. They had met on the set of television show Arjun.

The couple had their first child, a boy, Aarush on 15 September 2025.

== Career ==
Bajaj began as a child artist in 2003 and appeared in the films Footpath, Rakht, Kyun! Ho Gaya Na..., and Bhoot Unkle. Her initial success came with the portrayal of Dolly Singh in Best of Luck Nikki. She went on to star in shows like Kuch Toh Log Kahenge, Thapki Pyaar Ki, and Mariam Khan - Reporting Live.

== Filmography ==
=== Films ===
- Yaadein (2001)
- Footpath (2003)
- Rakht (2004)
- Kyun! Ho Gaya Na... (2004)
- Kalyug (2005)
- Bhoot Unkle (2006)
- Fashion (2008)
- Shagird (2011)
- Ladies vs Ricky Bahl (2011) in a cameo appearance
- Uvaa (2015) - Rashmi
- Non Stop Dhamaal (2023)

=== Television ===
Year	Title	Role	Notes
2003	Jassi Jaisi Koi Nahin	Unknown	
2007	Ssshhhh...Phir Koi Hai	Major Ripudaman's daughter	Episode 53 - Ek Bhoot, Ek Wakil, Ek Shaitaan
2007–2008	Cambala Investigation Agency	Nikki Mehra	Season 1
2010–2011	Ishaan: Sapno Ko Awaaz De	Himani	
2011–2016	Best of Luck Nikki	Dolly Singh	
2012	Kuch Toh Log Kahenge	Dr. Aditi	
2012	Savdhaan India	Rucha	Episodic appearance
2014	Arjun	Simran	
2014	SuperCops vs Supervillains	Shreya	
2015	Aahat	Nisha	Episodic appearance
2015	Fear Files: Darr Ki Sacchi Tasvirein	Ananya	Episodic appearance
2015	Pyaar Tune Kya Kiya	Zara	Episodic appearance
2015–2017	Thapki Pyar Ki	Aditi Pandey	
2016	Khidki	Simran	
2016, 2018	Box Cricket League	Contestant	Seasons 2–3
2017	Khatmal E Ishq - Do Phool Ek Maali	Mehek	
2017	Savitri Devi College & Hospital	Unnamed	Cameo
2017	Sankatmochan Mahabali Hanuman	Naagin	
2018–2019	Mariam Khan - Reporting Live	Meher Khan	
2018	Tujhse Hai Raabta	Varsha	Cameo
2019	Laal Ishq	Dr. Rani / Samiksha	Episodic appearance
2023–2024	Vanshaj	Ruhi Shroff	
