= Saniya Anklesaria =

India actress

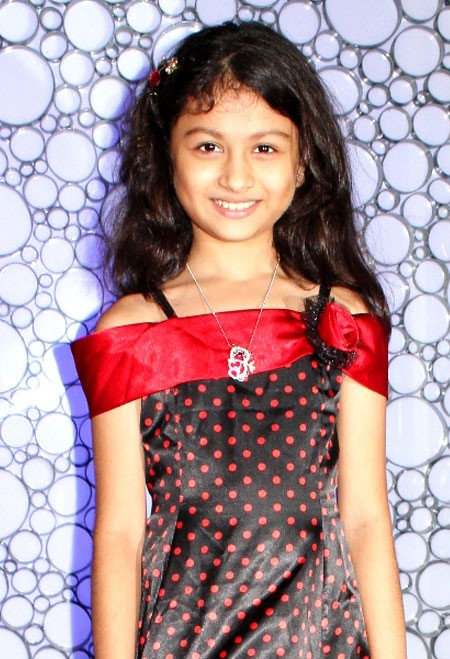
- Anklesaria at Life’s Good event in 2013
- Education: Computer Science Northeastern University, Boston; SVKM's NMIMS, Mumbai
- Occupation: Actress
- Years active: 2009–present
- Relatives: Rohit Gupta (Uncle)

Saniya Anklesaria is an actress who appears in Hindi films, commercials and TV shows. She is known for her role of Max in the Disney Channel India sitcom, The Suite Life of Karan & Kabir, an Indian adaptation of the American show The Suite Life of Zack & Cody and Guri Malhotra, a recurring character on the Disney hit series Best of Luck Nikki, an Indian adaptation of the American show Good Luck Charlie. She also appeared in mainstream Bollywood movies, like Rowdy Rathore, Raanjhanaa, Life's Good and Bombairiya.

== Career ==
Saniya Anklesaria first acted at the age of seven in Raell Padamsee's seven-day acting workshop during her summer vacation of 2009. Upon completion she was selected for a television commercial in her first audition. Since then she has featured in several television commercials and print media nationwide. She started dance at the age of four and then started taking dancing classes at the Shiamak Davar's dance company and Brian's Academy of dance in Mumbai that led to her earning several awards and accolades dancing competitively.

In 2012, she featured in Disney television series, The Suite Life of Karan & Kabir (Indian adaptation of the American show The Suite Life of Zack & Cody) portraying the character of Max, as one of Karan and Kabir's friend. The same year, she made her silver screen debut with Bollywood blockbuster film Rowdy Rathore, featuring actor Akshay Kumar and veteran actor Yashpal Sharma. She played Sharma's daughter in the film. Early that year, she was chosen to play the lead child actor role in national award-winning director Anant Mahadevan's Life's Good, alongside actors Jackie Shroff and Rajit Kapoor. The director was looking for three girls of similar appearance but different ages, and chose Anklesaria to play Mishti, the youngest character. In 2013 she was in the Bollywood film Raanjhanaa playing actress Sonam Kapoor's childhood followed by Bombairiya starring Radhika Apte, released in January 2019.

Anklesaria was cast as the lead child protagonist in the telefilm Terrorist Uncle, produced by Rohit Roy productions playing the daughter Minnie of veteran actor Ronit Roy and television actress Sakshi Tanwar.

== Filmography ==
=== Films ===
Year	Film	Role	Notes
2019	Bombairiya	Alice D'Mello	directed by Pia Sukanya
2018	Life's Good	Mishti	directed by Anant Mahadevan, produced by Anand Shukla
2013	Raanjhanaa	Zoya Haider's childhood	directed by Anand L. Rai
2012	Rowdy Rathore	Inspector Vishal Sharma's (Yashpal Sharma's) Daughter	directed by Prabhu Deva
2011	Aatankwadi Uncle	Mininie daughter of Ronit Roy & Sakshi Tanwar	telefilm directed by Sudipto Chattopadhyay produced by Rohit Roy productions
2011	A Quiet Noise	Aaliya (child protagonist)	short film directed by Nina Shrivastava produced by Whistling Woods
2011	Yellow Umbrella	child protagonist	short film directed by Arati Kadav produced by Whistling Woods

=== Television ===
Year	Title	Role	Notes
2015	Best of Luck Nikki (Season 4)	Guri Malhotra	(1 episode). Guri is the equivalent of Jo Kenner played by G. Hannelius in Good Luck Charlie.
2015	SuperCops vs Supervillains		(1 episode)
2013	The Suite Life of Karan & Kabir (Season 2)	Max	Character remake of Max, portrayed by Alyson Stoner in the original series, The Suite Life of Zack & Cody.
2012	The Suite Life of Karan & Kabir (Season 1)	Max	Character remake of Max, portrayed by Alyson Stoner in the original series, The Suite Life of Zack & Cody.
2011	Best of Luck Nikki	Guri Malhotra	S01E09 Guri is the equivalent of Jo Kenner played by G. Hannelius in Good Luck Charlie.
2011	Crime Patrol (TV series)		(1 episode)
	Krupa Shanidev Ki		(1 episode for Sagar Arts)

== Commercials and print advertisements ==
Title	Notes
Brooke Bond Red Label	
Chevrolet Cars	
Dabur Honitus	
Dabur Honey Squeeze	Directed by Pradeep Sorcar
Fortune Oil	Print and TV
Horlicks	TV commercial
ICICI Lombard General Insurance	
ITC Classmate Notebooks	TV commercial
Kailash Soyabean Oil	
Kellogg’s Honeyloops	TV commercial
Lilliput cycles	
Reliance Clothing	Print advertisement
Relieve and Relax tablets	TV commercial created by Origin Beanstalk for Gufic Bioscience Ltd
Samsung Airconditioners	TV commercial alongside Priyanka Chopra
Shilpa Stock Broker	TV commercial
Star Union Daichii Life Insurance	TV commercial
Sunflower Oil	for telecast in Chennai
Valentine Night wear	Catalogue print
Wipro CFL Bulb	
Wipro Smartlite Space Project	TV Commercial

== See also ==
- List of Indian film actresses
