= Jennifer Byrne Presents =

- Genre: Literary arts
- Presented by: Jennifer Byrne
- Country of origin: Australia
- Original language: English
- No. of seasons: 10
- No. of episodes: 66

Original release
- Network: ABC TV
- Release: 9 October 2007 – 17 May 2016

Jennifer Byrne Presents is an Australian television series of specials that was a spinoff from the First Tuesday Book Club presented by ABC journalist Jennifer Byrne. The show first aired on ABC TV on 9 October 2007. The program was broadcast on selected Tuesdays at 10:00 p.m. and was replayed at 4:30 p.m. on the following Sunday.

The series was sometimes broadcast on Thursday evenings at 8:00 p.m. In September 2012, an audience of 823,000 viewed her interview with J. K. Rowling and in October 2013, an audience of 637,000 viewers viewed her interview with Tim Winton.

The last known episode of the program was aired on 17 May 2016.

== Episode list ==
=== 2007 ===
Date	Program title	Guest(s)	Reference
9 October 2007	War Stories	Geraldine Brooks, Les Carlyon, Peter Cosgrove and Rowley Richards	
28 October 2007	Writing with Food	Mikey Robins, Gay Bilson, Marion Halligan and Lindsay McDougal	
24 November 2007	Bill Bryson	Bill Bryson	

=== 2008 ===
Date	Program title	Guest(s)	Reference
11 March 2008	Crime	Dorothy Porter, Graeme Blundell, Justice Ian Callinan, Shane Maloney	
15 April 2008	Greatest Characters From Fiction		
30 April 2008	Peter, Paul and Ian	Peter Carey, Paul Auster, Ian McEwan	
24 June 2008	Sex and Romance	Luke Davies, Sophie Gee, Anne Gracie, Christos Tsiolkas	
29 July 2008	Animal Tales	Jackie French, Sonya Hartnett, Peter Goldsworthy, Raimond Gaita	
11 November 2008	Biography	Jacqueline Kent, Graeme Blundell, Christine Wallace, Peter Fitzsimons	
22 December 2008	Dorothy Porter	Dorothy Porter	

=== 2009 ===
Date	Program title	Guest(s)	Reference
10 March 2009	Hoaxes	Malcolm Knox, Jack Marx, Michael Heyward, John Bayley	
9 June 2009	Cads and Bounders	Mia Freedman, Sandra Yates, Chris Taylor, Edmund Capon	
14 July 2009	Brave New Worlds	Emily Maguire, Max Barry, John Marsden, Richard Neville	
8 September 2009	Monsters and Bloodsuckers	Tara Moss, Leigh Blackmore, Cathrine Jinx, Will Elliott	
20 October 2009	True Crime	Rochelle Jackson, Andrew Rule, Jack Marx, Richard Spears	

=== 2010 ===
Date	Program title	Guest(s)	Reference
9 March 2010	Book to Film	John Collee, Ana Kokkinos, John Marsden, Margaret Pomeranz	
11 May 2010	Bestsellers & Blockbusters	Lee Child, Matthew Reilly, Di Morrissey, Bryce Courtenay	
13 July 2010	Christopher Hitchens	Christopher Hitchens	
24 August 2010	Ayaan Hirsi Ali	Ayaan Hirsi Ali	
21 September 2010	On the Road	Cate Kennedy, William Dalrymple, Claire Scobie, Tony Wheeler	
16 November 2010	Graphic Novels	Marieke Hardy, Dave Graney, Markus Zusak, Bob Sessions	

=== 2011 ===
Date	Program title	Guest(s)	Reference
15 March 2011	Cult Reads	Marieke Hardy, Dave Graney, Markus Zusak, Bob Sessions	
29 March 2011	Ken Follett	Ken Follett	
26 April 2011	Lovers	Andrea Goldsmith, Posie Graeme Evans, Mark Colvin, Toby Schmitz	
17 May 2011	The Future of Book	Richard Watson, Kate Eltham, Richard Flanagan	
12 July 2011	Fantasy	Jennifer Rowe, Fiona McIntosh, Lev Grossman, Matthew Reilly	
26 July 2011	Geraldine Brooks	Geraldine Brooks	
16 August 2011	Memoir	Jane Clifton, Kate Holden, Peter Fitzsimons, Benjamin Law	
26 September 2011	Christos Tsiolkas	Christos Tsiolkas	
11 October 2011	Alexander McCall-Smith	Alexander McCall Smith	
15 November 2011	Di Morrissey	Di Morrissey	

=== 2012 ===
Date	Program title	Guest(s)	Reference
14 February 2012	Words Aloud	Kim Scott, Mem Fox, Mark Colvin, Cate Kennedy	
29 May 2012	Dark Places	Jo Nesbø, Michael Robotham, Malla Nunn, Leigh Redhead	
12 June 2012	Punch Lines	Richard Glover, Chris Taylor, Virginia Gay, Lawrence Mooney	
19 June 2012	Erotica	David Malouf, Linda Jaivin, Krissy Kneen, Eddie Sharp	
26 June 2012	Books That Changed The World	Danielle Clode, Mark Carnegie, Christine Wallace, Geoff Dyer	
31 July 2012	Jeanette Winterson	Jeanette Winterson	
28 August 2012	Davo Sobel	Davo Sobel	
27 September 2012	JK Rowling: Life After Potter	J. K. Rowling	
16 October 2012	The Harry Games	John Marsden, Melina Marchetta, Morris Gleitzman, Steph Bowe	
19 November 2012	Michael Palin from Python to Brazil	Michael Palin	

=== 2013 ===
Date	Program title	Guest(s)	Reference
30 April 2013	Ian McEwan	Ian McEwan	
14 May 2013	PD James	PD James	
21 May 2013	Ian Rankin	Ian Rankin	
28 May 2013	Margaret Atwood	Margaret Atwood	
10 September 2013	Books That Changed the World, Volume II	Tom Holland, Ahdaf Soueif, Jared Diamond, Loretta Napoleoni	
17 September 2013	Pens and Prejudice	Anna Krien, Kate Mosse, Ramona Koval, James Wood	
24 September 2013	Elizabeth Gilbert	Elizabeth Gilbert	
10 October 2013	Tim Winton	Tim Winton	
12 November 2013	The Sports Pages	Rebecca Wilson, Christos Tsiolkas, Malcolm Knox, Mischa Merz	
19 November 2013	Bragging Rights	John Safran, Lawrence Mooney, Sandra Yates, Sophie Black	

=== 2014 ===
Date	Program title	Guest(s)	Reference
15 July 2014	The Seven Deadly Sins - GREED	Geoffrey Cousins, Janine Allis, Shane Maloney, Dee Madigan	
22 July 2014	The Seven Deadly Sins - WRATH	Brendan Cowell, Tracey Spicer, Craig Sherborne, Larissa Behrendt	
29 July 2014	The Seven Deadly Sins - PRIDE	Michael Williams, Kirstie Clements, Steve Vizard, Ramona Koval	
5 August 2014	The Seven Deadly Sins - LUST	Tara Moss, John Bell, Marieke Hardy, Jason Steger	
12 August 2014	The Seven Deadly Sins - SLOTH	Bob Carr, Hannah Gadsby, Gary Shteyngart, Robina Courtin	
19 August 2014	The Seven Deadly Sins - ENVY	Greg Sheridan, Angela Meyer, Lyndon Terracini, Kate McClymont	
26 August 2014	The Seven Deadly Sins - GLUTTONY	Wayne Macauley, George McEncroe, Mark Colvin, Charlotte Wood	
9 September 2014	Jane Goodall at Sydney Town Hall: Parts 1 & 2	Jane Goodall	
9 September 2014	Jane Goodall	Jane Goodall	
16 September 2014	Tom Keneally	Tom Keneally	
23 September 2014	Helen Garner	Helen Garner	
19 October 2014	Malala: Life After The Taliban	Malala Yousafzai	

=== 2015 ===
Date	Program title	Guest(s)	Reference
19 April 2015	Great War Stories	Peter FitzSimons, Christina Spittel, Merrick Watts, Delia Falconer	

=== 2016 ===
Date	Program title	Guest(s)	Reference
17 May 2016	Andy Griffiths	Andy Griffiths	

== See also ==
- First Tuesday Book Club
- List of Australian television series
