= Mastermind (British game show) =

British quiz show

- Also known as: Supermind; Mastermind Cup Final/Sport; Mastermind International; Mastermind Champions/Champion of Champions; Junior Mastermind
- Genre: Game show
- Created by: Bill Wright
- Presented by: Magnus Magnusson; Peter Snow; Clive Anderson; John Humphrys; Clive Myrie
- Theme music composer: Neil Richardson
- Opening theme: "Approaching Menace"
- Country of origin: United Kingdom
- Original language: English
- No. of series: 53 (Regular); 3 (Supermind); 4 (Cup Final/Sport); 5 (International); 2 (Champions/Champion of Champions); 5 (Junior)
- No. of episodes: 980 (Regular); 3 (Supermind); 13 (Cup Final/Sport); 5 (International); 8 (Champions/Champion of Champions); 29 (Junior)

Production
- Production locations: Dock10 studios (2011–2019); Blackstaff House, Belfast (2019–present)
- Running time: 30 minutes (Regular); 60 minutes (Series finals)
- Production companies: BBC (1972–2015); BBC Studios (2015–2019); Hat Trick Productions and Hindsight Productions (2019–present)

Original release
- Network: BBC1
- Release: 11 September 1972 – 1 September 1997
- Network: BBC Radio 4
- Release: 6 April 1998 – 31 July 2000
- Network: Discovery Channel
- Release: 12 November 2001 – 16 January 2002
- Network: BBC Two
- Release: 7 July 2003 – present

Related
- Celebrity Mastermind; Disney Q Family Mastermind

Mastermind is a British television quiz show for the BBC, first broadcast in 1972. Its creator, Bill Wright, drew inspiration from his experiences of being interrogated by the Gestapo during World War II. The show features an intimidating setting and challenging questions. Four (and in later contests five or six) contestants face two rounds, one on a specialised subject of the contestant's choice, the other a general knowledge round.

Mastermind's theme music is "Approaching Menace" by the British composer Neil Richardson. The show was recorded, with original presenter Magnus Magnusson, on location at UK universities. Later, it was recorded in Manchester at studios such as New Broadcasting House and Granada Studios, before moving to dock10 studios in 2011. The show relocated to Belfast for the 2019–2020 series. The current presenter is Clive Myrie.

== Format ==
=== Round 1 ===
For the first round, each contestant in turn is given a set length of time, usually two minutes (one minute and a half in semi-finals), to answer questions on a specialist subject which they have chosen. The contestant scores one point for each correct answer and may pass as often as desired. They must wait until the entire question has been read out before responding.

If the contestant responds incorrectly, the questioner gives the correct answer before continuing to the next question; answers to passed questions are read out only after time has expired. In early series, the score and time were kept by Mary Craig who sat next to Magnusson.

If time runs out while a question is being read, the questioner will finish it and give the contestant a few seconds to answer. This has led to the programme's catchphrase, "I've started so I'll finish." If a question has been read out in full when time expires, but the contestants have not yet given an answer, they are allowed a few seconds to do so. The contestant's score is displayed on screen; beginning with the 2016–17 series, the border around the score gradually turns blue (black in the 2019–20 series) during the final 10 seconds.

=== Round 2 ===
During the second round, each contestant in turn answers a series of general knowledge questions. The rules from the first round apply, except that the time limit is extended (usually two and a half minutes since 2010, or two minutes in semi-finals and until 2010). Originally, the contestants played in the same order as in the first round; currently, they play in ascending order by first-round score.

The winner is the contestant with the highest total score after two rounds. Ties are broken in favour of the contestant with the fewest total passes. If contestants have the same score and number of passes, a five-question tiebreaker is played. Each of the tied contestants answers the same set of questions individually, with the others exiting the studio so that they cannot hear the results. The contestant who gives the most correct answers is the winner.

The winners advance to the next round, for which they must choose a different specialised subject. In the early years of the programme, finalists were allowed to reuse their first-round subjects in the grand final. However, from 1992 onwards, the finalists are required to choose a third subject. The winner of the final of the BBC version is declared "Mastermind" for that year and is the only contestant to receive a prize, in the form of a cut glass engraved bowl. During Magnus Magnusson's tenure as presenter, the trophy was specially manufactured by Caithness Glass. A special guest would always be invited to present the trophy to the winner, with the exception of the final edition in 1997, in which Magnusson presented it himself. Every trophy used by the main series has been made by Scottish artist Denis Mann.

== Versions ==
Mastermind (1972 to 1997), presented by Magnus Magnusson, aired on BBC1. It was originally broadcast late on a Monday night and was not expected to receive a huge audience. In 1973 it was moved to a prime-time slot as an emergency replacement for a Leslie Phillips sitcom, Casanova '73, which had been moved to a later time following complaints about its risqué content. The quiz subsequently became one of the most-watched shows on British television. Magnusson's catchphrase "I've started, so I'll finish" was also the title of his history of the show. The original series was filmed in academic or ecclesiastical buildings. The last programme of the original series was filmed at St Magnus Cathedral in Orkney.

The original series spawned many specials:

- Supermind was an annual playoff between either the first four champions of Mastermind or champions of other TV quiz shows (including Mastermind) from 1976 or 1977. It ran for three years between 1976 and 1978.
- Cup Final Mastermind was an annual playoff between experts and supporters from the FA Cup Finalist teams they are supporting. It ran from 1978 and 1980.
- Mastermind International was an annual playoff between winners of various international versions of the show (or the nearest equivalents in some countries) and ran for five years between 1979 and 1983.
- Mastermind Champions was a 1982 3-part competition where the first ten champions of the show compete to become the Mastermind Champion of Champions.

BBC Radio 4's Mastermind, broadcast from 1998 to 2000, was hosted by Peter Snow.

Discovery Channel's Mastermind (2001) was hosted by Clive Anderson. The commercials shortened the amount of time available for answering questions and lasted just one series. This was also the first to go "interactive". By using the red button viewers could play the general knowledge section throughout the series. These questions had been written specifically to afford both standard and multiple-choice format in presentation. There was a one-off competition between the four highest scoring viewers.

In 2003, the current BBC Two version premiered, hosted by John Humphrys. Whereas the original series had kept talk to a minimum (asking contestants only their name, occupation and specialist subject), the new run had at first included some conversational elements with contestants, at the start of the General Knowledge round (normally about the contestant's specialist subject). But these have been dropped since the 2011 series. Instead, there is now a brief monologue from the winner at the end of each episode about how pleased they are to have won. There is no discussion with the other contestants. It is also distinguished from the original BBC TV series because many more of the specialist subjects come from popular culture. This probably reflects cultural changes in the British middle classes in recent years. Unlike the original version, this version is studio-based. It was formerly set in MediaCity in Salford. The show is now currently filmed in Northern Ireland. However, due to asbestos being found at Granada's Manchester studios parts of the 2006 series were filmed at Yorkshire Television's Leeds studios).

- In 2008 there was a 10-part competition this time entitled Sport Mastermind, hosted by Des Lynam.
- Mastermind Champion of Champions was a 2010 5-part competition that featured previous Mastermind champions.
- Junior Mastermind, also hosted by John Humphrys, is a children's version of the quiz programme and has the same format, the difference being that the contestants are only ten and eleven years old. The programme aired across six nights on BBC One, ending on 4 September 2004. The winner was Daniel Parker, whose specialist subjects were the Volkswagen Beetle (heat) and James Bond villains (final). There was another series in 2005 (subjects included Black Holes and the Star Wars trilogy), which was won by Robin Geddes, whose specialist subjects were The Vicar of Dibley and A Series of Unfortunate Events, with a third series airing in 2006, won by Domnhall Ryan, and featuring subjects such as Harry Potter and Chelsea Football Club, and a fourth series in 2007 won by Robert Stutter and a fifth series later that year won by David Verghese. The Junior version was cancelled after the two 2007 series.

In February 2021, Humphrys announced that after eighteen years at the helm of the show, he would leave the show. On 22 March 2021, it was announced that Clive Myrie would take over as host. Myrie made his debut on 23 August 2021.

In the United States, the game show 2 Minute Drill on sports network ESPN had its roots in Mastermind when Michael Davies and Andrew J. Golder attempted to develop a U.S. version of Mastermind for ABC. Contestants faced questions fired at them by a panel of four sports and entertainment celebrities for two minutes; like Mastermind, there were two rounds of questions, but the first round had each panellist's questions representing a different sports category pertaining to their area of expertise, and the second round had no categories and the contestant could not control who asked the questions; they were fired at random. The contestant with the highest score after two rounds would win a cash prize, and would have a chance to double those winnings by correctly answering the untimed "Question of Great Significance," as host Kenny Mayne called it, from a speciality category chosen by the winner (usually a particular athlete or sports team from the past). In each series, winners advanced in a bracket-style playoff format, with cash prizes increasing from $5,000 in the first round to $50,000 (doubling to $10,000–$100,000 by answering the final question) in the final round. Prizes such as trips to the Super Bowl or ESPY Awards were also given, known as "ESPN Experiences". The show had three series over a 15-month period, from September 2000 to December 2001. Like Mastermind, 2 Minute Drill featured a leather chair, dramatic lighting and sound effects. Willy Gibson of Columbus, Ohio, was the grand champion of the first two series; he was defeated in the second round of the third and final series.

== Records ==
=== Highest scores ===
The highest overall Mastermind score is 41 points, set by Kevin Ashman in 1995, his specialist subject being "The Life of Martin Luther King Jr." Ashman went on to become six times IQA world champion. In addition he holds the record for the highest ever score on Brain of Britain and has been a member of the Eggheads since that series debut.

In August 2010 during an edition of Mastermind Champion of Champions, the 2010 series champion, Jesse Honey, scored 23 out of 23 on "Flags of the World" in the specialist subject round, an all-time record. He finished as runner-up with a combined score of 36 points, losing out to Pat Gibson by having two more passes. Honey's score was equalled by Iwan Thomas, who scored a record 23 (in two-and-a-half minutes) in the general knowledge round in 2010.

On Junior Mastermind in February 2007, an 11-year-old schoolboy called Callum scored 19 points on his specialist subject, cricketer Andrew Flintoff. However, he did not win, being beaten by one point after achieving a final score of 32.

=== Lowest scores ===
The current record for the lowest score in the specialist subject round is jointly held by Troy Deeney and Dana on 22 December 2023, Harry Pinero on 2 February 2024 and Aaron Evans on 16 February 2024, all of whom scored no points when answering questions on the Sam Raimi trilogy of Spider-Man films, UK hit singles of 1969–76, Lewis Hamilton and cephalopods respectively.

The current record for the overall lowest score is two points, set on 5 November 2022 in a Celebrity edition by Gogglebox's Amy Tapper. She scored one point each in her specialist subject (the films of Adam Sandler) and the general knowledge round.

Prior to these, the record for the overall lowest score was five points, set on 29 January 2010 by software analyst Kajen Thuraaisingham, scoring four points for his specialist subject of the life of Mustafa Kemal Atatürk. Previous to this, the lowest attained score had been seven points, which was first set by Colin Kidd in 2005. His specialist subject was "The World Chess Championships". The score was equalled in November 2009 by gas fitter Michael Burton; he only scored two for his specialist subject, angels.

== Champions ==
=== Regular ===
Mastermind champions since 1972
Year	Winner	Specialist subjects		
Year	Winner	Heat	Semi-final	Final
1972	Nancy Wilkinson	French literature	European antiques	History of music, 1550–1900
1973	Patricia Owen	Grand Opera	Byzantine art	Grand Opera
1974	Elizabeth Horrocks	Shakespeare's plays	Works of J.R.R. Tolkien	Works of Dorothy L. Sayers
1975	John Hart	Athens 500–400 BC	Rome 100–1 BC	Athens 500–400 BC
1976	Roger Pritchard	Arthur Wellesley, 1st Duke of Wellington	20th-century British warships	Arthur Wellesley, 1st Duke of Wellington
1977	Sir David Hunt	World War II British campaigns in North Africa	World War II Allied campaign in Italy	Roman Revolution 60–14 BC
1978	Rosemary James	Roman and Greek mythology	Works of Frederick Rolfe	Roman and Greek mythology
1979	Philip Jenkins	Christianity AD 30–150	Vikings in Scotland and Ireland 800–1150 AD	History of Wales 400–1100
1980	Fred Housego	King Henry II	Westminster Abbey	Tower of London
1981	Leslie Grout	St. George's Chapel, Windsor Castle	Burial Grounds of London	St. George's Chapel, Windsor Castle
1983	Chris Hughes	British Steam Locomotives, 1900–63	Flashman novels	British Steam Locomotives, 1900–63
1984	Margaret Harris	Cecil Rhodes	The Postal History of South Africa	Cecil Rhodes
1985	Ian Meadows	English Civil War	History of astronomy to 1700	English Civil War
1986	Jennifer Keaveney	Elizabeth Gaskell	E. Nesbit	Elizabeth Gaskell
1987	Jeremy Bradbrooke	Franco-Prussian War	War of 1812	Crimean War
1988	David Beamish	Nancy Astor	British Royal Family, 1714–1910	Nancy Astor
1989	Mary Elizabeth Raw	King Charles I	Prince Albert	Charles I
1990	David Edwards	Michael Faraday	Benjamin Thompson	James Clerk Maxwell
1991	Stephen Allen	King Henry VII	Dartmoor and its environs	Francis Drake
1992	Steve Williams	Surrealist art 1918–39	Peter I of Russia	Pre-Socratic philosophy
1993	Gavin Fuller	Doctor Who	The medieval castle in the British Isles	The Crusades
1994	George Davidson	English coinage, 1066–1662	History of chemistry, 1500–1870	John Dalton
1995	Kevin Ashman	Martin Luther King Jr.	History of the Western film	Zulu War
1996	Richard Sturch	Charles Williams	Frederick III, German Emperor	Operas of Gilbert and Sullivan
1997	Anne Ashurst	Frances Carr, Countess of Somerset	Regency novels of Georgette Heyer	Barbara Villiers, Duchess of Cleveland
1998	Robert Gibson	Solar System	King Charles II	Robert the Bruce
1999	Christopher Carter	Birds of Europe	Tudor dynasty	British customs and traditions
2000	Stephen Follows	The Life and Operas of Benjamin Britten	The Poetry and Plays of T.S. Eliot	The Life and Operas of Leoš Janáček
2001	Michael Penrice	Professional boxing to 1980	(no semi-final)	English history 1603–1714
2003	Andy Page	Academy Awards	Gilbert and Sullivan	Golfing majors since 1970
2004	Shaun Wallace	UEFA Champions League finals since 1970	England at the UEFA European Championship	FA Cup Finals since 1970
2005	Patrick Gibson	The films of Quentin Tarantino	The Culture novels by Iain M. Banks	Father Ted
2006	Geoff Thomas	Édith Piaf	William Joyce	Margaret Mitchell and Gone with the Wind
2008	David Clark	Henry Ford	George, The Prince Regent	History of London Bridge
2009	Nancy Dickmann	Amelia Peabody novels of Elizabeth Peters	Life and films of Fritz Lang	Lewis and Clark Expedition
2010	Jesse Honey	London Borough of Wandsworth	The life and work of Antoni Gaudí	Liverpool Cathedral (Anglican)
2011	Ian Bayley	Romanov Dynasty	Life and Work of Jean Sibelius	Paintings in the National Gallery
2012	Gary Grant	Seven Wonders of the Ancient World	Monaco Grand Prix	Cetaceans
2013	Aidan McQuade	Michael Collins	The novels of Dennis Lehane	Abraham Lincoln
2014	Clive Dunning	Blackadder	Life and work of John Lennon	Life and poetry of Philip Larkin
2015	Marianne Fairthorne	Empress Livia	Çatalhöyük	Caterina Sforza
2016	Alan Heath	I, Claudius	British Summer Olympic Champions	Thunderbirds
2017	Isabelle Heward	The Life and Films of Rita Hayworth	The Daughters of George III	The Life and Films of Billy Wilder
2018	Brian Chesney	The Life of Harold Wilson	The Giordano Bruno novels of SJ Parris	The Revolt of the Netherlands 1568–1609
2019	Judith Lewis	The Life of C. S. Lewis	The Lord Peter Wimsey novels of Dorothy L. Sayers	The Fortunes of War series by Olivia Manning
2020	Dave McBryan	Otis Redding	Olympic Fencing	The View Askewniverse films of Kevin Smith
2021	Jonathan Gibson	Agatha Christie's Poirot	William Pitt the Younger	Flanders and Swann
2022	Alice Walker	Rodgers and Hammerstein	Julia Margaret Cameron	Peak District National Park
2023	Stuart Field	Jonathan Creek	The Jason Bourne Films	Extras
2024	Ruth Hart	Red Clydeside	The Novels of Muriel Spark	Francis Bacon
2025	John Robinson	Futurism	Pieter Bruegel the Elder	Empire State Building
2026	Diane Howe	Catherine Parr	Jeff Buckley	Jim Lovell

=== Supermind ===
Year	Winner	Specialist Subject
1976	Nancy Wilkinson	N/A

=== Doctor Who ===
Year	Winner	Specialist Subject
2005	Karen Davies	Doctor Who

=== Sport ===
Year	Winner	Specialist subjects		
Year	Winner	Heat	Semi-final	Final
2008	Chris Bell	British and Irish Lions	(no semi-final)	Life and career of Geoffrey Boycott

=== International ===
Year	Winner	Country	Specialist subject
1979	John Mulcahy	Ireland	Irish History (1916–22)
1980	Rachel "Ray" Stewart	Australia	Life and times of Julius Caesar
1981	David Harvey	New Zealand	The Lord of the Rings trilogy
1982	Leslie Grout	Great Britain	Windsor Castle
1983	Christopher Hughes	Great Britain	British Steam Locomotives

=== Champions/Champion of Champions ===
Mastermind Champion of Champions was televised Monday to Friday at 7:30pm on BBC Two in the first full week of August 2010. It featured the winners of previous series of Mastermind.

Year	Winner	Specialist subjects	
Year	Winner	Heat	Final
1982	Sir David Hunt	History of Cyprus	Alexander the Great
2010	Pat Gibson	Pixar animated films	Great mathematicians

=== Junior ===
Year	Winner	Specialist subjects	
Year	Winner	Heat	Final
2004	Daniel Parker	Tudor dynasty	James Bond villains
2005	Robin Geddes	The Vicar of Dibley	A Series of Unfortunate Events
2006	Domhnall Ryan	Supermarine Spitfire	Animals of the African plains
2007	Robert Stutter	Madame Tussaud	Tintin
2007	David Verghese	Jurassic Park films	George Lucas

== Chair ==
Contestants sit in a black leather chair, lit by a solitary spotlight in an otherwise dark studio. The inspiration for this was the interrogations faced by the show's creator, Bill Wright, as a prisoner of war in World War II. The original black chair was given to Magnus Magnusson as a souvenir when he retired from the show, and is now owned by his daughter Sally Magnusson who inherited it following her father's death in 2007. In 1979 the original black chair was taken by a group of students during the BBC crew's evening meal break, and held to ransom to raise money for charity; this delayed the recording of two programmes. The BBC commissioned a duplicate chair which was kept locked in the scenery truck at every recording to thwart similar ransom demands. The duplicate chair was never used on air, except in the title sequence, which was recorded in London while the main chair was on the road. The chair was featured on a 2024 episode of the British version of The Repair Shop, where Magnusson’s daughter brought it in for restoration.

The current chair, since 2003, is an Eames Soft Pad Lounge Chair, designed by Charles and Ray Eames in 1969.

== Video game ==
A video game adaptation was released for the ZX Spectrum in 1984 by Mirrorsoft. A companion game titled Mastermind Quizmaster was released at the same time and was meant to be used in conjunction with the first game. It allowed the user to write their own questions. Home Computing Weekly reviewed both games and gave them two out of five stars and said: "I have no doubt that someone, somewhere, will find these two programs of use." ZX Computing also reviewed both games and the computer's ability to recognise key words in the answers was praised but the loading times in a four-player game were criticized as too long.

== Parodies ==
The programme has been the target for many television spoofs, including a Two Ronnies sketch written by David Renwick (a less polished version had previously appeared in the Radio 4 series "The Burkiss Way") in 1980, featuring Ronnie Barker as Magnus Magnusson and Ronnie Corbett as a contestant named Charlie Smithers, whose specialist subject was "answering the question before last". A different sketch featured Monty Python alumni Michael Palin as Magnusson and Terry Gilliam as a contestant whose speciality was "questions to which the answer is two."

In 1974, Morecambe and Wise performed a sketch based on Mastermind, which featured Magnusson and the black chair. The format was different, however, with Wise, then Morecambe, being asked ten questions each.

In 1975 The Goodies featured Mastermind in the episode "Frankenfido" when a dog (Bill Oddie in a suit) appeared on the show and managed to correctly answer questions asked of it as they all had answers that could be represented by growls, such as "bark" and "ruff".

In the late 1970s, Noel Edmonds' Sunday lunchtime radio show featured a send-up called "Musty Mind" where a phone-in contestant would be asked ludicrous questions on a parody of a serious subject, such as the "Toad Racing" or, on another occasion, "The Cultural and Social History of Rockall" – Rockall being a bald lump of uninhabited rock in the eastern Atlantic.

The 2003-onwards version has been spoofed by the Dead Ringers team, with Jon Culshaw playing John Humphrys. In one send-up, which appeared on the television edition of Dead Ringers, the contestant offered to answer questions on Mary Queen of Scots, but when an answer was given, John Humphrys was shown saying "Yes, but you sexed that answer up". The sketch was a reference to the controversy caused by the aftermath of the Iraq War. One episode included Mastermind: The Opera.

Another spoof was featured in Armando Iannucci's 2004: The Stupid Version, where a contestant's specialist subject was "The television series Thunderbirds and Lady Penelope's Cockney chauffeur".

Also in 2004, Johnny Vaughan's BBC Three show Live at Johnny's featured a version called Mastermind Rejects — the premise being that the specialist subjects were too ludicrously obscure even for Mastermind. In the final show of the series, Magnus Magnusson took over as the quizmaster — it was the last time he would utter the catchphrase "I've started so I'll finish" on any form of Mastermind. The specialist subject was The History of the Home Video Recorder, 1972 to 1984.

On their 2005 Christmas Special, comedy duo French & Saunders parodied the show with Jennifer Saunders playing Abigail Wilson, a pensioner whose special subject is ceramic teapots. She passes on all but one question, which she answers incorrectly.

In 2005, the show was spoofed on BBC Radio 4's The Now Show where the specialist subject was "Britishness", relating to the proposed test immigrants may have to take, to prove they can fit in with British society.

Benny Hill parodied Mastermind on The Benny Hill Show on at least two occasions. In one of the parodies the show was called "Masterbrane". In each, Benny played the role of Magnusson while Jackie Wright played the hapless contestant.

Spitting Image used the Mastermind format in a sketch where a Magnus Magnusson puppet asked questions of a Jeffrey Archer puppet whose specialist subject was himself. The twist was that Archer's puppet, being incapable of answering questions about himself without exaggeration or evasion, ends the round with zero points.

The BBC's satirical current affairs quiz show Have I Got News for You has parodied the show several times, by turning the lights down – except for spotlights above select chairs – and playing the theme tune, before subjecting at least one of the panel to some rigorous questioning. The first occasion was on the 1995 video special, when only regular captains Ian Hislop and Paul Merton were asked questions; Hislop on "The Life and Lies of Jeffrey Archer", and Merton on "Absurd Newspaper Stories Between 1990 and 1995". The second occasion was in 1998, when Magnus Magnusson appeared as a guest. All four panellists were asked questions on this occasion.

In his early routines Bill Bailey would often parody the Mastermind music, finding it very sinister. He would then play the music on keyboard with an over-the-top hellish sounding climax. In the last episode of "Is It Bill Bailey?" he followed on from this performance with a sketch where he was a contestant on Mastermind, and it was implied that his specialist subject was the microwave cooking instructions on supermarket ready meals. As the camera panned out it became evident that the chair itself was on a platter, slowly turning in a giant microwave oven.

The Channel 4 Prank programme Balls of Steel parodied Mastermind with its sketch The Alex Zane Cleverness Game, in which experts were quizzed on their specialist subjects (included were "The Life of Anne Frank", "Eurovision Song Contest Winners", and "Hercule Poirot"). Unbeknown to the experts, the show was a hoax, and incorrect answers were included to frustrate them whenever they supplied the correct answer.

The BBC Three comedy show Snuff Box had the two main characters Rich Fulcher and Matt Berry both appear on Mastermind. Berry chose his specialist subject as Alton Towers and only scored 3 points before a blackout, in which he apparently shoots the host after being told to sit down. Fulcher chooses 'Anglo-Saxon architecture', though displays no knowledge of the subject and makes up answers such as "Toto from The Wizard of Oz" and "Elvis", and scoring no points.

In 2011, The Chris Moyles Show on BBC Radio 1 parodied the show with a feature called "Disastermind". Using the back-up chair from the Mastermind studio, each team member chose a specialist subject, only to have them swapped before being questioned in the chair on their randomly selected subject and general knowledge. The specialist subjects were The World of Glee; UK dialling codes; U2; Husky Dogs and Back to the Future.

In 2013, Mastermind featured on the ITV show Ant & Dec's Saturday Night Takeaway, as part of an Ant Vs Dec segment where Ant and Dec had to answer questions based around a school challenge they took part in. Ant won.

In 2026, the show was seen in a sketch featured in an episode of Saturday Night Live UK, hosted by Jack Whitehall. Whitehall played the character of Ben Michael, with the occupation of “something in IT” and the specialist subject of “Things my mum has told me about people I’ve never met and have no connection to”. Myrie was portrayed by SNL UK cast member Hammed Animashaun.

== Transmissions ==
=== Regular ===
Start and end dates for all series prior to the 29th were taken from the Radio Times magazine.

Series	Start date	End date	Episodes	Presenter	Network
1	11 September 1972	26 December 1972	15	Magnus Magnusson	BBC 1
2	3 September 1973	27 December 1973	17	Magnus Magnusson	BBC 1
3	5 September 1974	23 December 1974	17	Magnus Magnusson	BBC 1
4	4 September 1975	22 December 1975	17	Magnus Magnusson	BBC 1
5	7 September 1976	24 December 1976	17	Magnus Magnusson	BBC 1
6	30 August 1977	20 December 1977	17	Magnus Magnusson	BBC 1
7	7 September 1978	26 December 1978	17	Magnus Magnusson	BBC 1
8	5 September 1979	23 December 1979	17	Magnus Magnusson	BBC 1
9	31 August 1980	21 December 1980	17	Magnus Magnusson	BBC 1
10	6 September 1981	27 December 1981	17	Magnus Magnusson	BBC 1
11	9 January 1983	8 May 1983	17	Magnus Magnusson	BBC 1
12	29 January 1984	27 May 1984	17	Magnus Magnusson	BBC 1
13	6 January 1985	5 May 1985	17	Magnus Magnusson	BBC 1
14	12 January 1986	29 June 1986	22	Magnus Magnusson	BBC 1
15	4 January 1987	7 June 1987	22	Magnus Magnusson	BBC 1
16	7 January 1988	5 June 1988	23	Magnus Magnusson	BBC 1
17	15 January 1989	11 June 1989	22	Magnus Magnusson	BBC 1
18	7 January 1990	17 June 1990	22	Magnus Magnusson	BBC 1
19	20 January 1991	2 June 1991	17	Magnus Magnusson	BBC 1
20	16 February 1992	7 June 1992	17	Magnus Magnusson	BBC 1
21	10 January 1993	16 May 1993	17	Magnus Magnusson	BBC 1
22	20 March 1994	21 August 1994	17	Magnus Magnusson	BBC 1
23	9 April 1995	6 August 1995	17	Magnus Magnusson	BBC 1
24	29 May 1996	14 October 1996	17	Magnus Magnusson	BBC 1
25	9 June 1997	1 September 1997	13	Magnus Magnusson	BBC 1
26	6 April 1998	29 June 1998	13	Peter Snow	BBC Radio 4
27	29 March 1999	21 June 1999	13	Peter Snow	BBC Radio 4
28	8 May 2000	31 July 2000	13	Peter Snow	BBC Radio 4
29	12 November 2001	16 January 2002	13	Clive Anderson	Discovery Channel
30	7 July 2003	3 November 2003	17	John Humphrys	BBC Two
31	21 June 2004	5 December 2004	31	John Humphrys	BBC Two
32	8 March 2005	8 November 2005	31	John Humphrys	BBC Two
33	30 March 2006	2 November 2006	31	John Humphrys	BBC Two
34	9 July 2007	24 March 2008	31	John Humphrys	BBC Two
35	5 September 2008	19 June 2009	31	John Humphrys	BBC Two
36	28 August 2009	28 May 2010	31	John Humphrys	BBC Two
37	20 August 2010	15 April 2011	31	John Humphrys	BBC Two
38	4 November 2011	11 May 2012	31	John Humphrys	BBC Two
39	10 August 2012	5 April 2013	31	John Humphrys	BBC Two
40	9 August 2013	25 April 2014	31	John Humphrys	BBC Two
41	8 August 2014	27 March 2015	31	John Humphrys	BBC Two
42	7 August 2015	1 April 2016	31	John Humphrys	BBC Two
43	13 July 2016	3 March 2017	31	John Humphrys	BBC Two
44	28 July 2017	30 March 2018	31	John Humphrys	BBC Two
45	5 October 2018	14 June 2019	31	John Humphrys	BBC Two
46	9 August 2019	4 May 2020	31	John Humphrys	BBC Two
47	5 October 2020	26 April 2021	31	John Humphrys	BBC Two
48	23 August 2021	11 April 2022	31	Clive Myrie	BBC Two
49	19 September 2022	24 April 2023	31	Clive Myrie	BBC Two
50	28 August 2023	1 April 2024	31	Clive Myrie	BBC Two
51	12 August 2024	19 May 2025	31	Clive Myrie	BBC Two
52	14 July 2025	20 April 2026	31	Clive Myrie	BBC Two
53	13 July 2026	TBA	31	Clive Myrie	BBC Two

=== Supermind ===
Date	Presenter	Network
1 January 1976	Magnus Magnusson	BBC 1
28 December 1976	Magnus Magnusson	BBC 1
3 January 1978	Magnus Magnusson	BBC 1

=== Cup Final/Sport ===
Series	Start date	End date	Episodes	Presenter	Network
6 May 1978				John Motson	BBC 1
12 May 1979				Frank Bough	BBC 1
10 May 1980				Des Lynam	BBC 1
1	8 July 2008	20 August 2008	10	Des Lynam	BBC Two

=== International ===
Date	Presenter	Network
28 February 1979	Magnus Magnusson	BBC 1
7 April 1980	Magnus Magnusson	BBC 1
11 June 1981; 3 June 1981 (Australia)	Magnus Magnusson	BBC 1 ABC (Australia)
3 June 1982	Magnus Magnusson	BBC1
29 August 1983	Magnus Magnusson	BBC1

=== Champions/Champion of Champions ===
Series	Start date	End date	Episodes	Presenter	Network
1	1 May 1982	3 May 1982	3	Magnus Magnusson	BBC 1
2	2 August 2010	6 August 2010	5	John Humphrys	BBC 1

=== Junior ===
Series	Start date	End date	Episodes	Presenter	Network
1	30 August 2004	4 September 2004	6	John Humphrys	BBC Two
2	15 May 2005	22 May 2005	6	John Humphrys	BBC Two
3	26 January 2006	26 February 2006	6	John Humphrys	BBC Two
4	8 January 2007	12 February 2007	6	John Humphrys	BBC Two
5	10 December 2007	21 December 2007	5	John Humphrys	BBC Two

=== Specials ===
Date	Entitle	Presenter	Network
19 March 2005	Doctor Who Mastermind	John Humphrys	BBC Two
22 September 2014	Hip Hop Mastermind	John Humphrys	BBC Two
19 May 2018	Motty Mastermind	John Motson	BBC Two

== International versions ==
Currently in production
No longer in production

Region or country	Local name	Network	Host	Broadcast
Australia	Mastermind	ABC	Huw Evans	1978–1984
Australia	Mastermind	SBS	Jennifer Byrne (2019–2021); Marc Fennell (2021–)	2019–present
Australia	Celebrity Mastermind Australia	SBS	Jennifer Byrne (2020); Marc Fennell (2021)	2020–2021
Bangladesh	Mastermind Family Bangladesh	Duronto TV	Nobonita Chowdhury	2019–2020
Estonia	Mälumaraton	TV3	Teet Margna	2023
Iceland	Meistari	Stöð 2	Helgi Pétursson	1986
India	Mastermind India	BBC India; Miroshka	Siddhartha Basu	1998–2002
India	Disney Q Family Mastermind	Disney Channel India	Benjamin Gilani	2013
(Republic of Ireland) Ireland	Mastermind	TV3	Nora Owen	2011
Israel	מקבילית המוחות; Makbilit hamokhot	Channel 1	Yitzhak Shimoni; Michael Dak	1990–1996
Kazakhstan	Зерде; Zerde	Khabar	Böpeş Jandaev	2018–2019
Netherlands	Megabrein	KRO	Erik van Muiswinkel	1991–1993
New Zealand	Mastermind	TVNZ 1	Peter Sinclair	1976–1991
New Zealand	Mastermind	TVNZ 1	Peter Williams	2016
Russia	Властелин ума Vlastelin uma	Bibigon	Andrey Urgant	2007
Russia	Гений; Genij	Russia-K	Alexey Begak	2017–2018
Turkey	Mastermind Türkiye	NTV	Altan Erkekli	2013
United States	Mastermind	Pilot	Mitchell Laurance	19 August 1989
United States	2 Minute Drill	ESPN	Kenny Mayne	2000–2001
Wales	Mastermind Cymru	S4C	Betsan Powys	2006–2007, 2020–2021
Wales	Mastermind Plant Cymru	S4C	Betsan Powys	2008–2009, 2020–2021
Wales	Celebrity Mastermind Cymru	S4C	Betsan Powys	2006–2009, 2020

== See also ==
- Mastermind (board game)
