= Denis Mann =

Scottish glass artist

Denis Mann (born 1935) is a Scottish glass artist. He studied under Helen Monro Turner at the Edinburgh Art College where he learnt the copper wheel engraving technique, which he used in his later career. After a short stint as an art teacher, including during National Service with the Royal Air Force, Mann became a professional artist. Mann sent several pieces of work to Caithness Glass, ahead of accepting a job there as engraver and designer, and these were spotted by Bill Wright, creator and producer of upcoming BBC game show Mastermind. Wright asked Mann to produce the trophies for the show. The first of these was presented in 1972 and Mann went on to produce them for each subsequent series. He is now semi-retired.

== Early life and career ==
Mann was born in Ballinluig, Perthshire, in 1935. He was educated at Breadalbane Academy in Aberfeldy and then at Edinburgh Art College. At the college Mann studied under Helen Monro Turner (wife of glass chemist W. E. S. Turner). Mann particularly specialised in copper wheel engraving, a now rarely used technique that allows the engraving of delicate shapes in glass. He notes "it is such a beautiful technique. There is also the pleasure of knowing that I am continuing such an ancient tradition".

Mann then trained as a teacher and taught art in Stirlingshire. Called up for National Service Mann served as an art teacher with the Royal Air Force. He was deployed to the Aden Protectorate which he described as a culture shock that "re-awoke the urge to draw anything and everything". In his early 30s he became disillusioned with teaching and sought employment as an artist. He moved to Wick, Caithness, in 1970, by which time he was married to Trudi, an assistant archivist.

== Mastermind trophies ==
In 1970 Mann was visiting Caithness Glass to discuss terms, ahead of accepting a job there as designer and engraver. On the same day Bill Wright, creator and producer of upcoming BBC game show Mastermind, was visiting the factory to discuss a trophy for the show. Mann did not meet Wright on that day but some of his copper wheel engraved work, depicting human figures, was shown to Wright and he approved. Mann accepted the job at Caithness Glass and worked on designing and producing bowls, including those that he would later engrave for Mastermind. Wright commissioned the trophy from Caithness Glass and the work was given to Mann. The pair met early in 1971 to discuss the design, which Wright wanted to be classical in style and feature the nine Muses of Greek mythology.

The first trophy was presented at the end of the inaugural 1972 series and Mann went on to produce the trophy for every subsequent edition of the programme, producing 50 trophies by 2022. Each trophy is themed on the Muses but is unique in design. In the initial years the Mastermind producers visited Mann to discuss the design of each trophy. In recent times Mann has used former Scottish National Party MSP Gail Ross as a muse and model for the work, she donates her fee to charity. In recognition of his work on the programme Mastermind presenter Magnus Magnusson presented Mann with a signed limited edition print of the show's iconic chair, on its 25th anniversary.

== Later life ==
After leaving Caithness Glass Mann established his own studio on the Caithness coast, whose landscape would inspire some of his work. He uses a lathe that used to belong to Helen Turner. Mann has produced pieces for Queen Elizabeth The Queen Mother, Elizabeth II, the BBC programme One Man and His Dog and Compaq. In 2010 he exhibited Discord, an engraved glass panel depicting two hands above a piano keyboard about to play a dischord, at the Turner Museum of Glass in Sheffield.

Mann is now semi-retired and lives in Wick.
