= First Tuesday =

First Tuesday may refer to:

- First Tuesday - a monthly NBC newsmagazine television program (1969 to 1973) first hosted by Sander Vanocur
- First Tuesday (documentary strand) - a monthly British current affairs television documentary strand
- First Tuesday (networking forum) - a London-based networking forum
- First Tuesday Book Club - an Australian book discussion television programme

== See also ==
- Election Day (United States), often but not always held on the first Tuesday of November
