= Catherine Geissler =

British nutritionist

- Born: Catherine Alison Geissler; 19 February 1940 (age 86); Edinburgh
- Education: University of Edinburgh, University of California, Berkeley
- Known for: Human Nutrition
- Spouse: The Right Hon Sir Robin Auld

Catherine Alison Geissler, Lady Auld is a prominent British nutritionist and author and co-author of widely recognised reference textbooks on human nutrition.

== Education ==
Geissler was born in Edinburgh and educated at the Mary Erskine School for girls. On leaving school she attended Edinburgh University, where she studied dentistry, obtaining her Bachelor of Dental Surgery BDS in 1963.

In 1963-64 she spent a research year in Paris, followed by a year as a dental surgeon in Scotland before moving to California, where she initially taught dental radiography in San Francisco City College. She was then appointed to a research position in the Department of Nutrition, University of California, Berkeley, which led to a master's in nutrition (1971). After her master's degree she went to the National Nutrition and Food Technology Research Institute in Teheran (under Habibollah Hedayat), where she participated in studies of energy expenditure of agricultural workers, carpet weavers and rural women. as well as her personal work for her PhD on lactation in different socio-economic groups in Teheran. Her PhD in Human Nutrition at Berkeley was based on her lactation studies in Teheran, Iran.

== Professional appointments ==
Professor of Human Nutrition, King's College London; Head of department of Nutrition and Dietetics, King's College London; Head, Division of Health Sciences, School of Health and Life Sciences, King's College London; Director of UK Higher Education Academy, Centre for Health Sciences and Practice. She has worked as Attachée de recherche, Laboratoire de Nutrition Humaine (INSERM), Hôpital Bichat, Paris(1972-1974) in the group of Jean Trémolières, Visiting Professor at the Division of Nutritional Sciences Cornell University Ithaca, New York (1989–90) and at MRC Human Nutrition Research, and associate at Darwin College, Cambridge (2010).

She is professor emerita of human nutrition, King's College London, past president of The Nutrition Society of the UK & Ireland (2013–16) and is currently secretary general of the International Union of Nutritional Sciences (IUNS) (2013–2022). Her principal research interests are in international public health nutrition; energy metabolism and obesity; and iron metabolism. In 2003 she was invited by the Belgian government to give expert evidence on the role of ephedrine in the treatment of obesity.

A recognized authority on human nutrition and public health, Geissler has served on many professional committees including the Ministry of Agriculture, Food and Fisheries (MAFF) Food Advisory Committee, the World Cancer Research Fund grants committee, and the British and American Nutrition Societies, and extensively as consultant to international development agencies including the World Bank (Senegal, Diourbel 1980, Senegal, Casamance 1980, Ghana 1981, Syria 1984, Niger 1991, Niger 1992, Benin 1993, Madagascar 1995, Armenia 1997), CGIAR, FAO (Mauritius 1974, Haiti 1982), WHO, the International Livestock Centre for Africa, Addis Ababa, Ethiopia 1982, UNICEF (Iran 1998), the British Council (Sierra Leone 1984, Syria 1984), in many countries including Iran, Haiti, Mauritius, Sierra Leone, Niger, Benin, Senegal, Ghana, Ethiopia, Yemen, Thailand, Philippines, Singapore, Indonesia, Malaysia and China.

Geissler has over 200 academic publications, in addition to her text books.

== Personal life ==
She is the daughter of the artist William Geissler and the glass engraver Alison Geissler. She lived for extended periods in several different countries before her appointment in 1976 to a lectureship in human nutrition at Queen Elizabeth College, London, which in 1985 merged with King's College, London.

== Distinctions ==
2003 Fellow of the Higher Education Academy (FHEA) (Nº25241)

2015 XI International Nutrition and Health Prize (Premio Internacional Alimentación y Salud), Facultad de Farmacia, Universidad de Navarra

2016 Elected Fellow of The Nutrition Society of the UK & Ireland

2018 American Society for Nutrition Kellogg Prize for Lifetime Achievements in International Nutrition

2020 Elected Fellow of the American Society for Nutrition

August 2025 Elected to title of Living Legend of the International Union of Nutritional Sciences

== Textbooks ==
- Food, Diet and Economic Change Past and Present Catherine Geissler, Derek J. Oddy 1993 Leicester University Press ISBN 978-0718514501
- The New Oxford Book of Food Plants J.G. Vaughan, C.A. Geissler 1997 1st edition, Oxford University Press ISBN 0198548257; 2009 2nd edition, Oxford University Press ISBN 9780199549467
- Fundamentals of Human Nutrition – for Students and Practitioners in Health Sciences, C. Geissler and H. Powers 2009, Churchill Livingstone Elsevier ISBN 9780443069727
- Human Nutrition eds C. Geissler & H. Powers 2005 11th edition, Elsevier ISBN 9780702044632; 2011 12th edition, Elsevier ISBN 978-0702031182; 2017 13th edition, Oxford University Press ISBN 9780198768029; 2023 14th edition Oxford University Press ISBN 9780198866657
