= Helen Turner =

Helene or Helen Turner may refer to:

- Helen Turner (artist) (1858–1958), American painter and teacher
- Helene Turner (before 1895–after 1966), American film editor, a/k/a Helen Turner
- Helen Monro Turner (1901–1977), Scottish artist
- Helen Alma Newton Turner (1908–1995), Australian geneticist and statistician
- Helen Turner Watson (1917–1992), American nurse and educator
- Helen Turner (basketball) (born 1977), British wheelchair Paralympian
