= Alison Geissler =

Alison Geissler M.B.E.
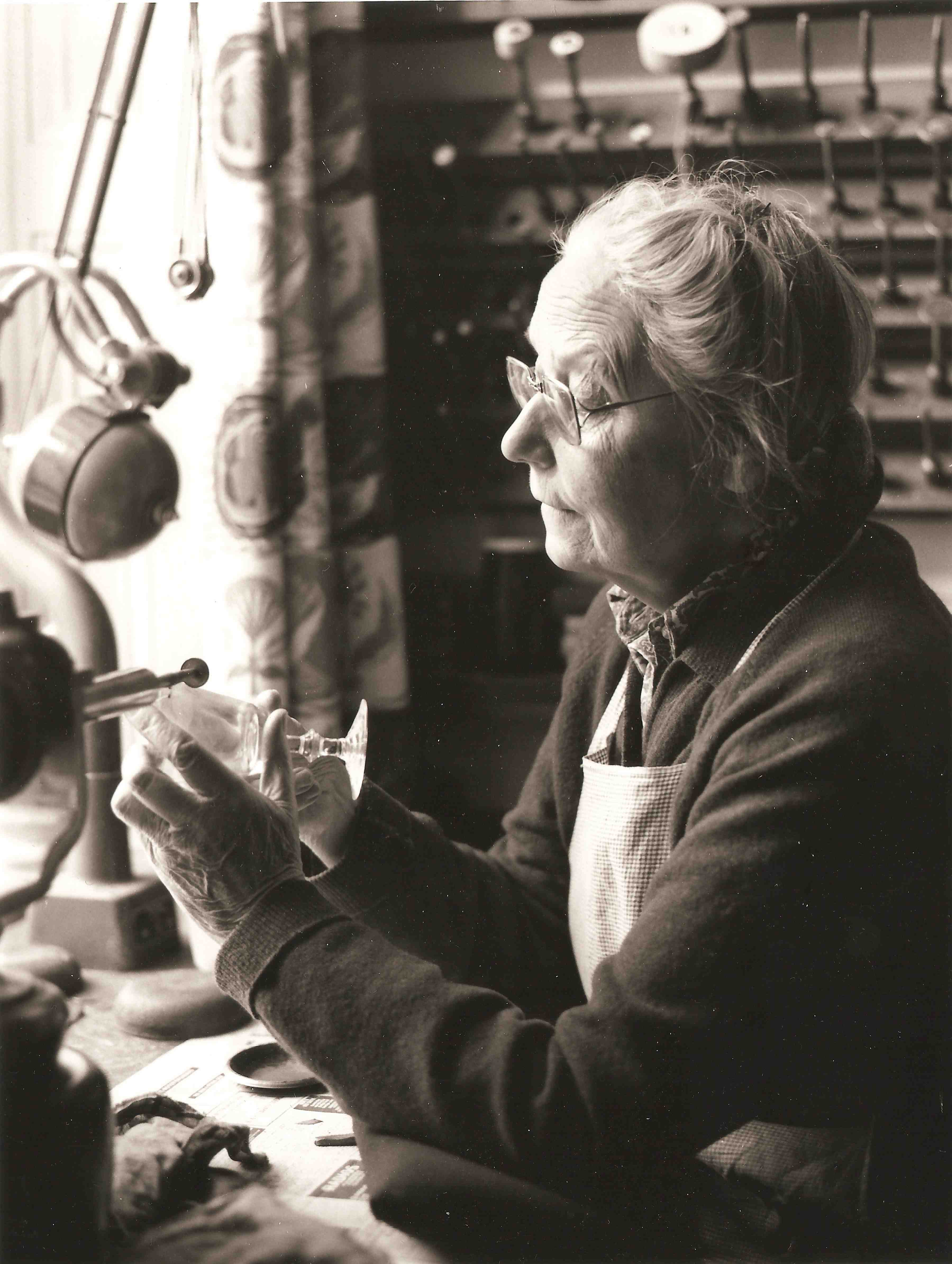
- Alison Geissler 1983 © CSG CIC Glasgow Museums Collection
- Born: Alison Cornwall McDonald; 13 April 1907; Edinburgh, Scotland
- Died: 25 January 2011 (aged 103); Edinburgh, Scotland
- Education: Edinburgh College of Art, Helen Monro Turner
- Known for: Glass Engraving
- Spouse: William Geissler

Alison Cornwall Geissler MBE, née McDonald (13 April 1907 – 25 January 2011), was one of the foremost glass engravers in Scotland during the mid-twentieth century.

== Education and personal life ==
Educated at The Mary Erskine School for Girls in Edinburgh, she entered Edinburgh College of Art (ECA) in 1925, where she studied drawing and painting. After graduating in 1930, she was awarded a post-graduate scholarship. In 1931 she married the watercolourist painter William Geissler, a former tutor at ECA who had recently been appointed Art Master at Perth Academy. In 1935, William was appointed to the Art Department of Moray House College of Education, and the couple returned to Edinburgh, where their three children, Paul, Erik and Catherine, were born. Between 1940 and 1943, the menace of German bombing on Leith Docks not far from their home induced the family to evacuate first to Dolphinton, then to Carlops, villages outside Edinburgh. Her grandson is the news broadcaster Martin Geissler.

== Career ==
Geissler's glass engraving career started at the end of the Second World War, when she returned to ECA to study under Helen Monro Turner, who had come back from studies in Germany just before the outbreak of World War II. Monro Turner opened the glass engraving department at Edinburgh College of Art in January 1941, despite the challenges of obtaining equipment during the war period. At the time of Geissler's enrolment in 1945, ECA possessed a single glass engraving lathe that overheated, which allowed only intermittent and unreliable access, and had to be shared in shifts with Monro’s other student, Harold Gordon. This inconvenience was compounded by the official regulation preventing students from working in the evenings. Acquisition of a glass engraving lathe from Germany in 1947 finally enabled Geissler to work independently from home. Almost all of her work involved traditional copper wheel engraving, with oil and carborundum powder as abrasive.

Her work is "marked by elegant stylised design balanced with beautifully observed natural detail". Her skill in lettering and draughtsmanship brought her to the attention of Jan Tarnowski, director of the Scottish Craft Centre, whose advice and guidance were instrumental in bringing her many commissions. These works attracted widespread recognition. A set of engraved goblets, representing ten of the heraldic Queen's Beasts (comprising the lion of England, the griffin of Edward III, the falcon of the Plantagenets, the black bull of Clarence, the yale of Beaufort, the white lion of Mortimer, the red dragon of Wales, the unicorn of Scotland, and the white horse of Hanover), was presented to Her Majesty the Queen by the High Constables and the Guard of Honour of Holyrood House for the Coronation in 1953. Several of Geissler's works are in the ownership of the British royal family, and several are in collections, at the National Museum of Scotland, Edinburgh, Kelvingrove Art Gallery and Museum, and the Corning Museum of Glass, New York.

The identifiability of many of her commissions make them unsuitable for general publication. One such piece, a striking display of her skill, is a crystal glass dish on which the personal signatures of 30 guests attending a private celebration are engraved mirror-wise by copper wheel on the underside of the dish. An exhibition of her work was held in 1983 at Kelvingrove Art Gallery. In 1991 she was awarded the distinction of MBE for her services to glass engraving. On the occasion of her centenary in 2007, an interview was published in the Newsletters of the Glass Society and of the Edinburgh College of Art. She maintained her professional glass engraving career until the age of 94. In 2008, at the age of 101, she was awarded the Chairman's Medal of the Edinburgh College of Art, which was founded in the same year as she was born.

== Gallery ==
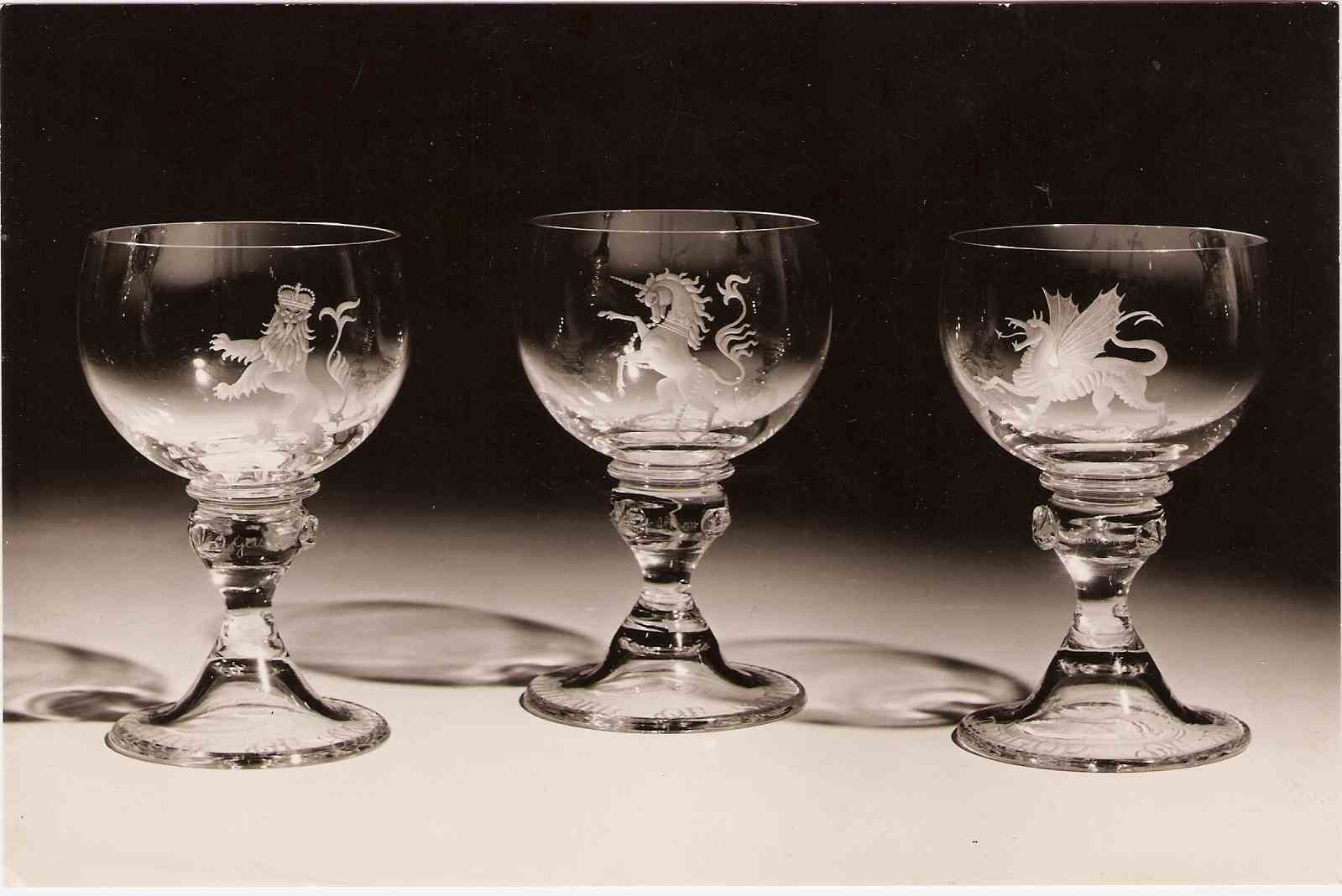
Three out of 10 goblets engraved by Alison Geissler and presented to Her Majesty Queen Elizabeth by the High Constables and the Guard of Honour of Holyrood House for the Coronation in 1953. The wineglasses are part of the Royal Collection. © Studio Swain, Glasgow.

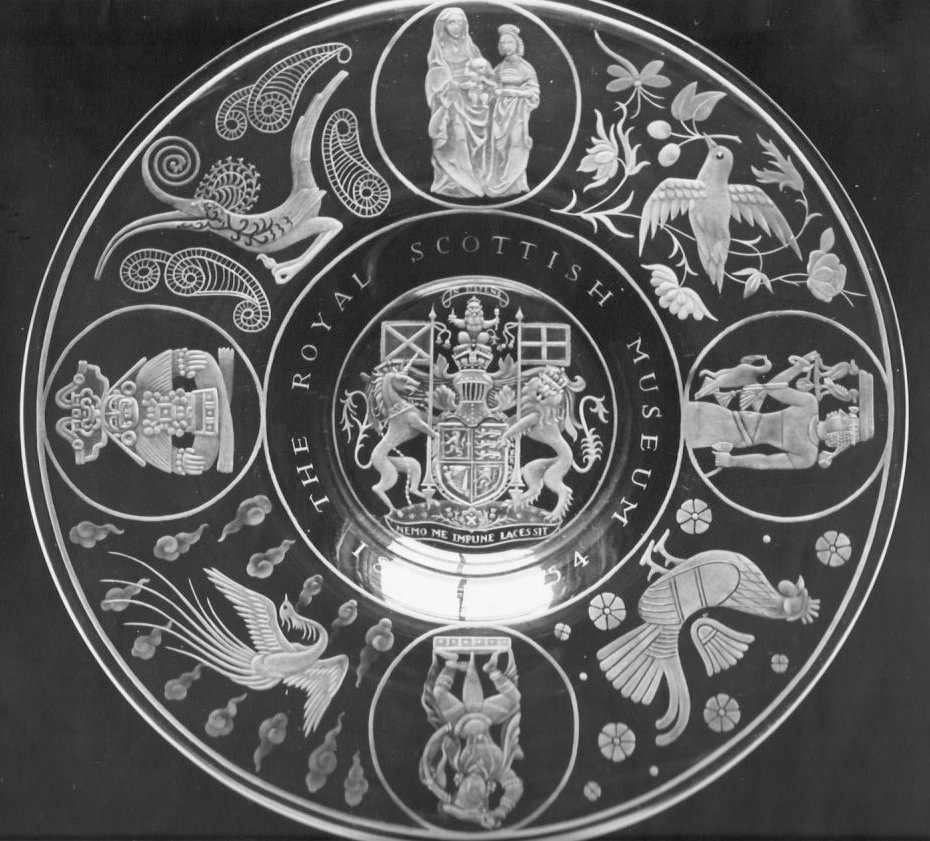
Plate engraved for the Centenary of the Royal Scottish Museum, Edinburgh. Courtesy of the National Museum of Scotland.

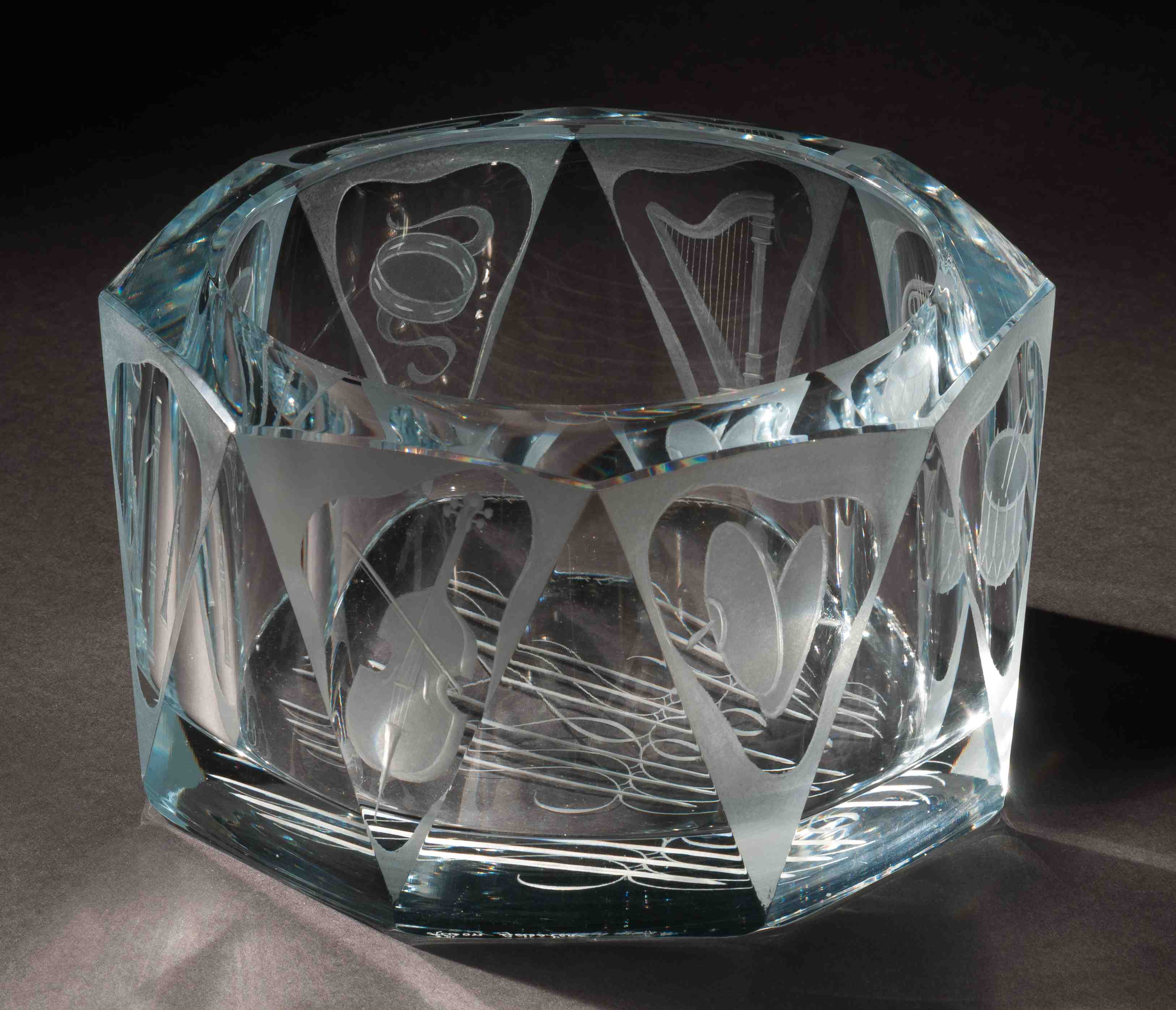
Glass bowl engraved with musical instruments on alternate faces and treble clef motif on the base. © Mike Fear

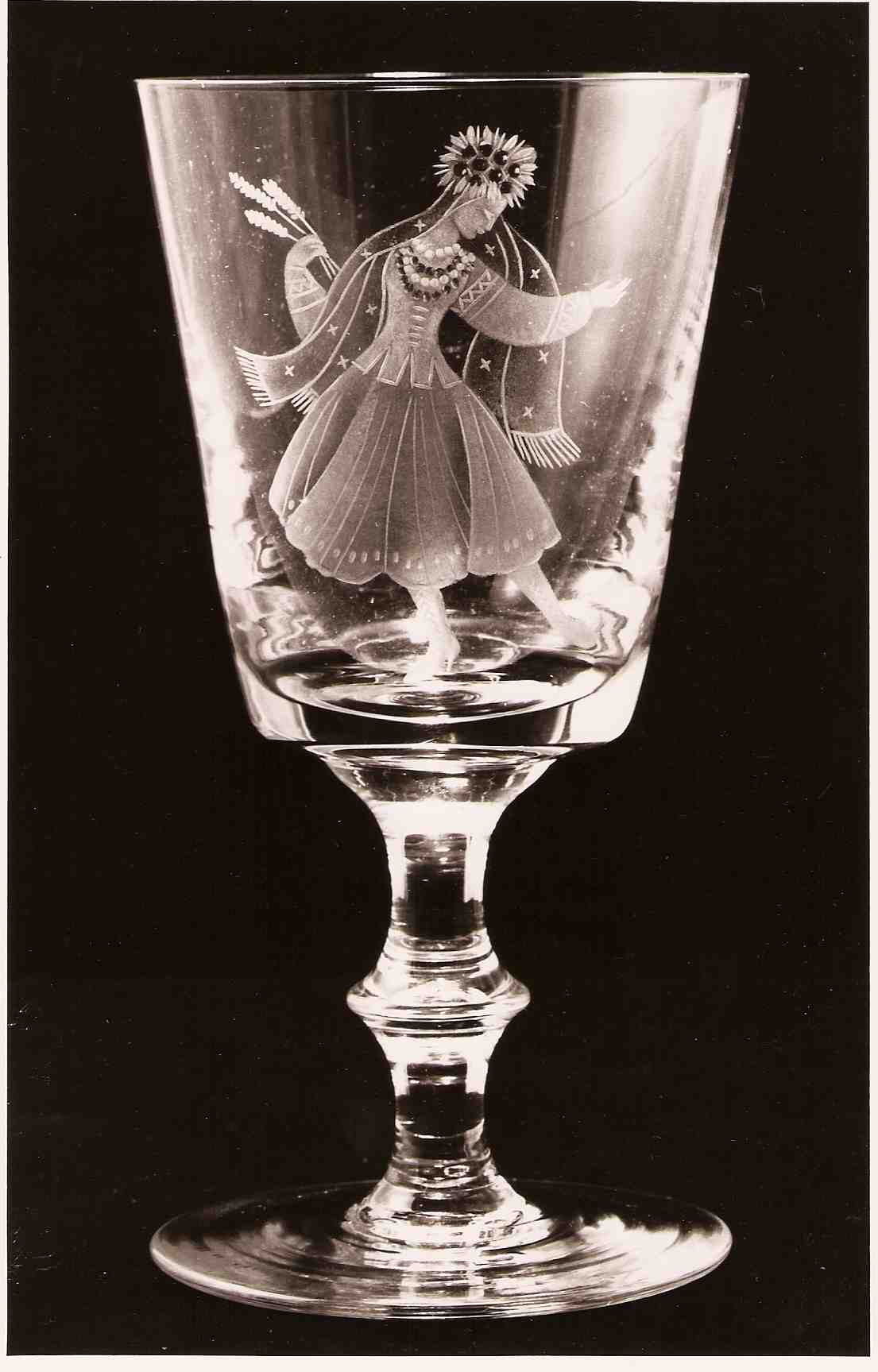
Wineglass with Russian dancer © CSG CIC Glasgow Museums Collection

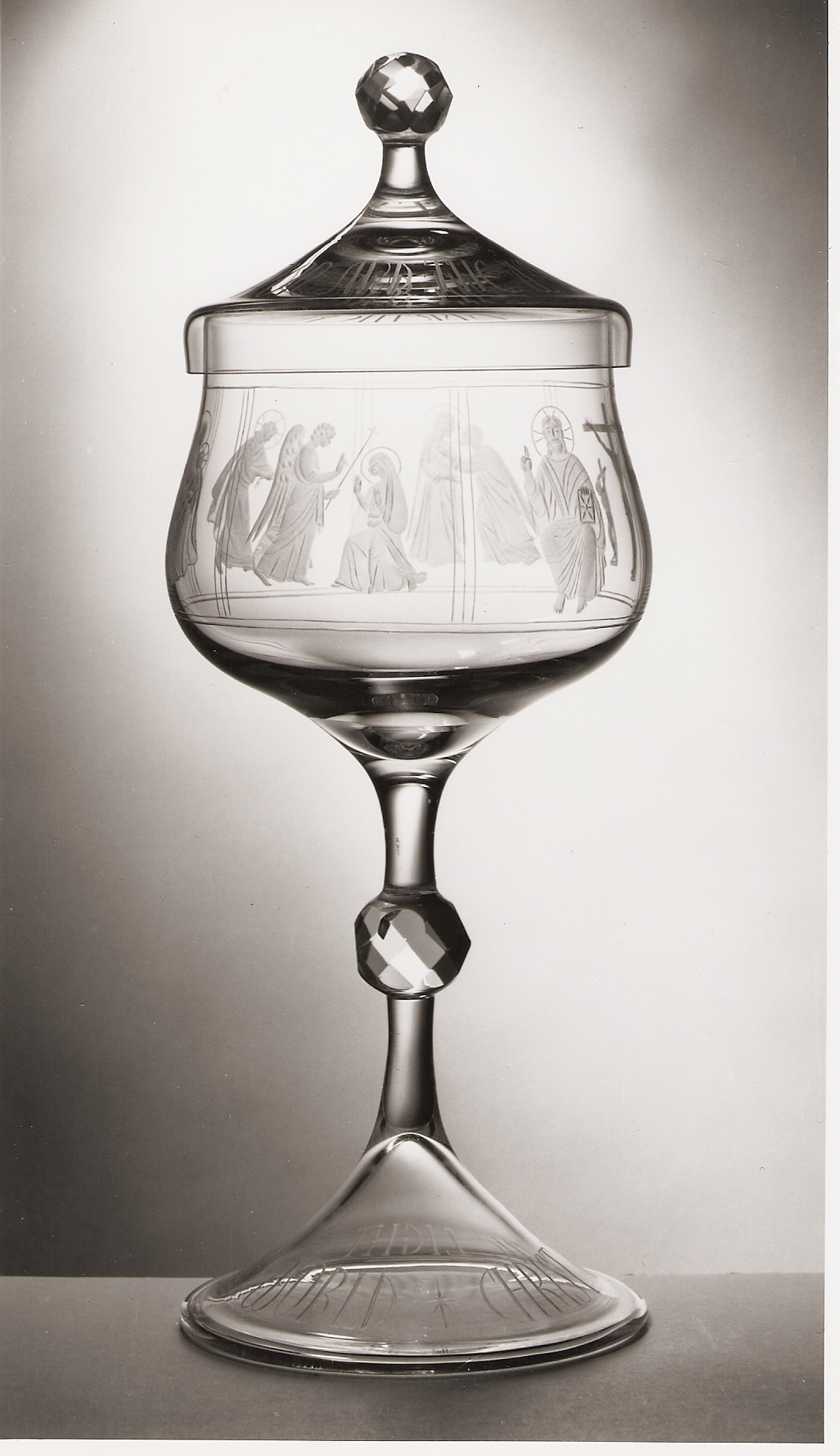
Covered goblet engraved with six scenes from the life of Christ, 1982

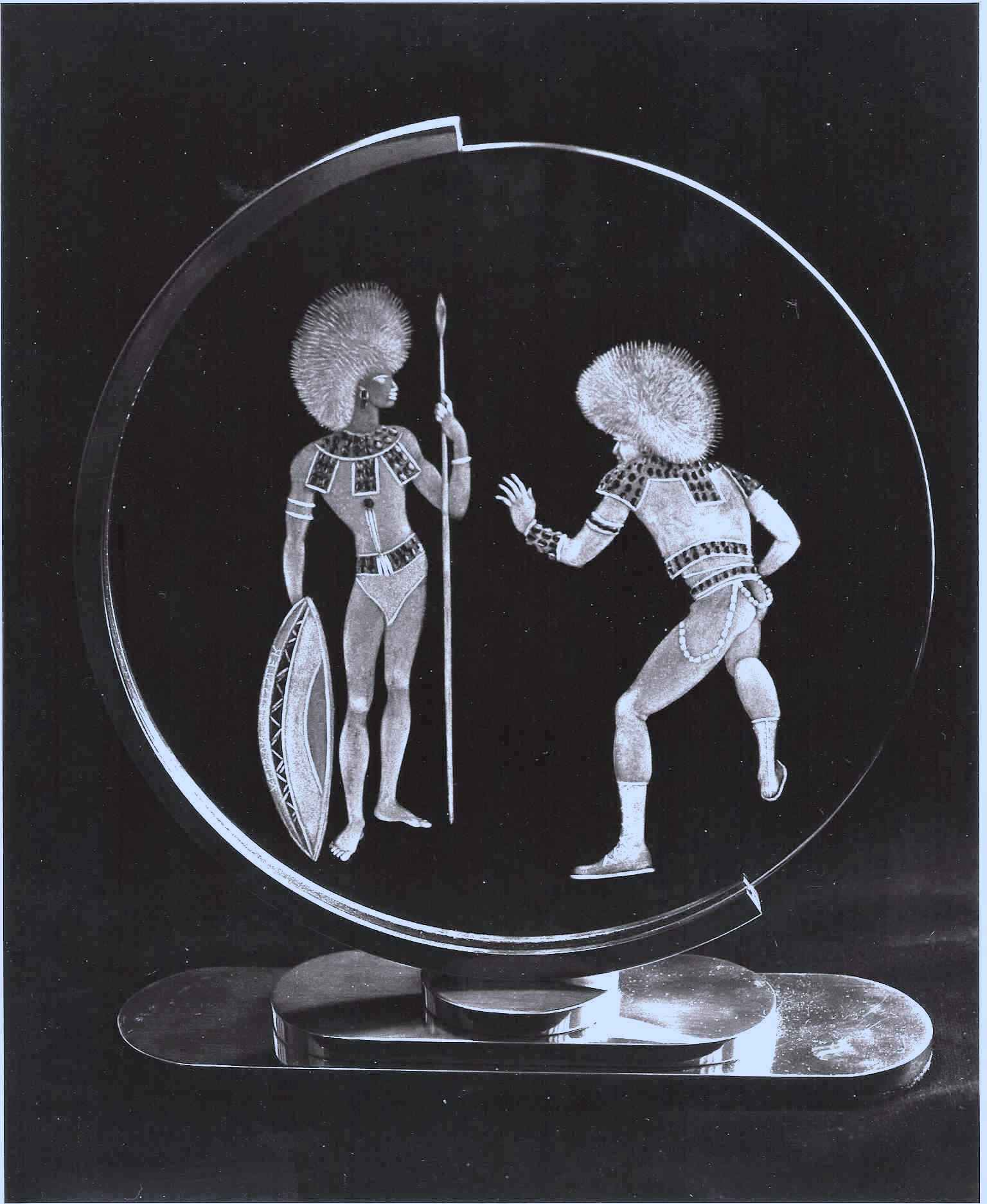
Engraved glass plate, Scottish Craft Collection 1984. © Antonia Reeve

== Distinctions ==
1991 Member of the British Empire

2007 Edinburgh College of Art Chairman's Medal

2020 A street in Edinburgh is named in honour of Alison Geissler
