= The Book Club =

- Also known as: First Tuesday Book Club
- Genre: Literary Arts
- Presented by: Jennifer Byrne
- Country of origin: Australia
- Original language: English
- No. of seasons: 7
- No. of episodes: 57

Original release
- Network: ABC
- Release: 1 August 2006 – 19 December 2017

The Book Club (formerly First Tuesday Book Club) is an Australian television show that discussed books, ostensibly in the style of a domestic book club. Hosted by journalist Jennifer Byrne, it used a panel format with two regular members – book reviewer Jason Steger and author/blogger Marieke Hardy – and two guest members. The show first aired on ABC on 1 August 2006 and was scheduled as a monthly program. The show concluded in 2017.

== Books reviewed ==
=== 2006 ===
- American Psycho by Bret Easton Ellis – August 2006
- The Ballad of Desmond Kale by Roger McDonald – August 2006
- The Shadow of the Wind by Carlos Ruiz Zafón – September 2006
- Longitude: The True Story of a Lone Genius Who Solved the Greatest Scientific Problem of His Time by Dava Sobel – September 2006
- The Life and Times of the Thunderbolt Kid by Bill Bryson – October 2006
- The Rachel Papers by Martin Amis – October 2006
- The Mission Song by John le Carré – November 2006
- The Transit of Venus by Shirley Hazzard – November 2006
- The Unknown Terrorist by Richard Flanagan – December 2006
- The God Delusion by Richard Dawkins – December 2006

=== 2007 ===
- Mister Pip by Lloyd Jones – March 2007
- The Solid Mandala by Patrick White – March 2007
- In the Company of the Courtesan by Sarah Dunant – April 2007
- The Secret River by Kate Grenville – April 2007
- The Road by Cormac McCarthy – May 2007
- Slaughterhouse-Five by Kurt Vonnegut – May 2007
- The Raw Shark Texts by Steven Hall – June 2007
- Alice's Adventures in Wonderland by Lewis Carroll – June 2007
- The Post-Birthday World by Lionel Shriver – July 2007
- Le Grand Meaulnes by Alain-Fournier – July 2007
- A Thousand Splendid Suns by Khaled Hosseini – August 2007
- The Dancer Upstairs by Nicholas Shakespeare – August 2007
- The Broken Shore by Peter Temple – September 2007
- The Memory of Running by Ron McLarty – September 2007
- Moby-Dick by Herman Melville – October 2007
- East of Time by Jacob G. Rosenberg – October 1997
- On Chesil Beach by Ian McEwan – November 2007
- The Big Sleep by Raymond Chandler – November 2007
- Not in the Flesh by Ruth Rendell – December 2007
- The Children by Charlotte Wood – December 2007

=== 2008 ===
- The Memory Room by Christopher Koch – March 2008
- Naked by David Sedaris – March 2008
- Liar's Poker by Michael Lewis – April 2008
- People of the Book by Geraldine Brooks – April 2008
- The Girl with the Dragon Tattoo by Stieg Larsson – May 2008
- A Farewell to Arms by Ernest Hemingway – May 2008
- Breath by Tim Winton – June 2008
- Demons at Dusk by Peter Stewart – June 2008
- Peter Pan by J. M. Barrie – July 2008
- Miracles of Life by J. G. Ballard – July 2008
- Devil May Care by Sebastian Faulks – August 2008
- The Adventures of Augie March by Saul Bellow – August 2008
- Disquiet by Julia Leigh – September 2008
- A Confederacy of Dunces by John Kennedy Toole – September 2008
- The Lonely Passion of Judith Hearne by Brian Moore – October 2008
- Pandora in the Congo by Albert Sánchez Piñol – October 2008
- The Outsider by Albert Camus – November 2008
- Something to Tell You by Hanif Kureishi – November 2008
- The Guernsey Literary and Potato Peel Pie Society by Mary Ann Shaffer – December 2008

=== 2009 ===
- The Grapes of Wrath by John Steinbeck – March 2009
- The White Tiger by Aravind Adiga – March 2009
- Revolutionary Road by Richard Yates – April 2009
- The Private Patient by P. D. James – April 2009
- The Slap by Christos Tsiolkas – May 2009
- Darwin and the Barnacle by Rebecca Stott – May 2009
- The Great Gatsby by F. Scott Fitzgerald – June 2009
- Ransom by David Malouf – June 2009
- The Housekeeper + the Professor by Yōko Ogawa – July 2009
- The Collector by John Fowles – July 2009
- Gone Tomorrow by Lee Child – August 2009
- Middlesex by Jeffrey Eugenides – August 2009
- The Leopard by Giuseppe Tomasi di Lampedusa – September 2009
- Jeff in Venice, Death in Varanasi by Geoff Dyer – September 2009
- The Little Stranger by Sarah Waters – October 2009
- Ask the Dust by John Fante – October 2009
- This is How by M. J. Hyland – November 2009
- The Prime of Miss Jean Brodie by Muriel Spark – November 2009
- Ordinary Thunderstorms by William Boyd – December 2009
- Summer Reads – December 2009

=== 2010 ===
- Cloudstreet by Tim Winton – March 2010
- Zeitoun by Dave Eggers – March 2010
- Solar by Ian McEwan – April 2010
- Strange Case of Dr Jekyll and Mr Hyde by Robert Louis Stevenson – April 2010
- Wide Sargasso Sea by Jean Rhys – May 2010
- The Museum of Innocence by Orhan Pamuk – May 2010
- Pride and Prejudice by Jane Austen – June 2010
- Reading by Moonlight by Brenda Walker – June 2010
- One Day by David Nichols – July 2010
- Portnoy's Complaint by Philip Roth – July 2010
- Anna Karenina by Leo Tolstoy – August 2010
- Beatrice and Virgil by Yann Martel – August 2010
- To Kill a Mockingbird by Harper Lee – September 2010
- Inheritance by Nicholas Shakespeare – September 2010
- Indelible Ink by Fiona McGregor – October 2010
- The Catcher in the Rye by J. D. Salinger – October 2010
- Atlas Shrugged by Ayn Rand – November 2010
- Freedom by Jonathan Franzen – November 2010
- Parrot and Olivier in America by Peter Carey – December 2010
- Dead Man's Chest by Kerry Greenwood – December 2010

=== 2011 ===
March 2011

- Madame Bovary by Gustave Flaubert
- Our Kind of Traitor by John le Carré

April 2011

- Super Sad True Love Story by Gary Shteyngart
- The Man Who Loved Children by Christina Stead

May 2011

- Blood Meridian by Cormac McCarthy
- Me and Mr Booker by Corey Taylor

June 2011

- Women in Love by D. H. Lawrence
- The Happy Life by David Malouf

July 2011

- The Last Werewolf by Glen Duncan
- Cold Comfort Farm by Stella Gibbons

August 2011

- The Master and Margarita by Mikhail Bulgakov
- Past The Shallows by Favel Parrett

September 2011

- Cloud Atlas by David Mitchell
- Kinglake 350 by Adrian Hyland

October 2011

- The Hare with Amber Eyes by Edmund de Waal
- Rebecca by Daphne du Maurier

November 2011

- The Happy Prince by Oscar Wilde
- A Visit from the Goon Squad by Jennifer Egan

December 2011

- Summer Special 2012
- How I Became A Famous Novelist by Steve Hely

=== 2012 ===
March 2012

- Great Expectations by Charles Dickens
- The Submission by Amy Waldman

April 2012

- Nineteen Eighty-Four by George Orwell
- Why Be Happy When You Could Be Normal? by Jeanette Winterson

May 2012

- The Light Between Oceans by M. L. Stedman
- The Silence of the Lambs by Thomas Harris

June 2012

- The Ghost Writer by Philip Roth
- The Riddle of the Sands by Erskine Childers

July 2012

- The Cook by Wayne Macauley
- Crossing to Safety by Wallace Stegner

August 2012

- The Age of Miracles by Karen Thompson Walker
- The Sea, the Sea by Iris Murdoch

== Guests ==
Guests have included Jesuit priest Frank Brennan, actress Penny Cook, gardener Peter Cundall, Sex Discrimination Commissioner Pru Goward, feminist Germaine Greer, author Di Morrissey, enfant-terrible John Safran, musician and broadcaster Lindsay "The Doctor" Mc Dougall, politician Malcolm Turnbull, retired NSW Premier Bob Carr, comedian Judith Lucy, movie critic Bill Collins, retired Australian General (and author) Peter Cosgrove, and actor/writer/director Richard E Grant.

== See also ==
- Jennifer Byrne Presents
- List of Australian television series
- The Book Group – British comedy
