= Jacob Rosenberg =

Polish author (1922-2008)

Jacob G. Rosenberg (1922–2008) was an author and Holocaust survivor. Rosenberg's poetry and prose have been published in both Australia and overseas.

== Life ==
Jacob G. Rosenberg was born in 1922 in Łódź, Poland and grew up as the youngest member of a working-class family. After the Germans occupied Poland, he was confined with his parents, two sisters, and their little girls in the Łódź Ghetto until they were sent to Auschwitz. All of the members of his family – except for himself and his sister, who committed suicide a few days later – were gassed on the day of their arrival. He remained in Auschwitz for about two months and spent the rest of the war in various other concentration camps.

In May 1945, he was liberated and moved to a Displaced Persons camp in Italy where he met and married Esther Laufer, who was a survivor of eight camps. He and his wife emigrated to Australia in 1948. Their only child, Marcia, was born in Melbourne.

Jacob G. Rosenberg died in 2008 in Melbourne, at age 86.

== Works ==
Rosenberg wrote in Yiddish prose and poetry for Yiddish journals Snow in Spring (1984), Wooden Clogs Shod with Snow (1988) and Light - Shadow - Light (1992) but in order to reach a wider audience he switched to English. He wrote collections of poetry and prose but it was his two volumes of memoirs East of Time (2005) and Sunrise West (2007) which won him awards and nominations. He described them as, " ... a personal weave of autobiography, history and imagination".

== Reviews ==
Following Rosenberg's death in 2008 Jason Steger wrote in the Sydney Morning Herald that, "Rosenberg was a unique writer who inspired immense love in readers who delighted in the fable-like quality of his writing, its gentle humour and the depth of his humanity." In the same article Melbourne poet Chris Wallace-Crabbe said, "Rosenberg was a noble soul, 'one who swallowed nobody's easy answers or solutions. His writing salts dignity with wit and unobtrusive learning.'"

The Sydney Morning Herald in its obituary described him as, "...a poet, storyteller and author who lived through one of history's darkest nightmares, and in his writings created a passionate and unique testament. His prize-winning autobiographies, East of Time and Sunrise West, were written in his third language, English."

== Selected works ==
- שניי אין פרילינג : Snow in Spring in Yiddish (1984)
- אין טרעפעס געקאוועטע מיט שניי : Wooden Clogs Shod with Snow (1988)
- ליכט, שאטן, ליכט : Light-Shadow-Light (1992)
- My Father's Silence (1994)
- Twilight Whisper (1997)
- Behind the Moon (2000)
- Lives and Embers (2003)
- East of Time (2005)
- Sunrise West (2007)
- The Hollow Tree (2008)

== Awards ==
=== East of Time ===
- 2006 Winner New South Wales Premiers Award Douglas Stewart Prize for Non-Fiction
- 2006 Shortlisted Victorian Premier's Literary Awards — The Nettie Palmer Prize for Non-Fiction
- 2006 Shortlisted ASAL (Association for the Study of Australian Literature) Awards — ALS Gold Medal
- 2006 Shortlisted Festival Awards for Literature (SA) — Award for Innovation in Writing
- 2007 Winner National Biography Award 2007

Plus three major state awards

=== Sunrise West ===
- 2008 Winner Adelaide Festival's Awards for Literature (SA) non-fiction prize
- 2008 Winner New South Wales Premier's Literary Awards - Community Relations Commission Award
- 2008 shortlisted New South Wales Premier's Literary Awards —Douglas Stewart Prize for Non-Fiction
