= Disney Q Family Mastermind =

- Created by: Bill Wright
- Presented by: Benjamin Gilani
- Country of origin: India
- Original language: Hindi
- No. of seasons: 1

Production
- Running time: 30 minutes
- Production companies: BBC Worldwide; Miroshka India

Original release
- Network: Disney Channel India
- Release: 25 February – 24 October 2013

Disney Q Family Mastermind is a television game show that aired on Disney Channel India. It is the reworked version of the British quiz show Mastermind, tweaked to include families as participants. The show is hosted by Benjamin Gilani.

== Format ==
There are four rounds for each contestant family. Each round has a time limit - 90 seconds in Rounds 1 and 3, and 2 minutes in Rounds 2 and 4. Whenever time runs out, a buzzer of four beeps is sounded. Then, if a question is being read or has just been read, the contestant in control is given a short period of time to answer.

Each correct answer is worth 2 points. Players may pass if they do not know the answer to a question. The scores and pass count of each family is announced after each round.

=== Round 1 ===
The smallest member of each family has to give answers to general knowledge questions.

=== Round 2 ===
Each family has to choose a subject from a set list of eight, which becomes the basis of all questions in their round. All members play, though control is given to one member at a time. The smallest member is given control first, and each next question is always first given to the next player from whoever is last in control.

Passing on a question allows the next member in line to answer it themselves, and one pass is counted against the family only if all four members pass on a question.

=== Round 3 ===
Each family has to choose a member, who will give answers to questions of their specialist subject.

=== Round 4 ===
The family that is trailing plays this round first. Similar to Round 2, all members of each family play. Questions are again of general knowledge, and each incorrect answer here costs 1 point.

The family that ends up with the higher total score is the episode's winner.
