= Mastermind (Australian game show) =

2019–present Australian TV series

- Genre: Game show
- Created by: Bill Wright
- Presented by: Jennifer Byrne; Marc Fennell
- Country of origin: Australia
- Original language: English
- No. of series: 8
- No. of episodes: 597

Production
- Running time: 30 minutes (Regular episodes); 60 minutes (Series finals)
- Production company: BBC Studios Australia and New Zealand

Original release
- Network: SBS
- Release: 15 April 2019 – present

Mastermind is an Australian television quiz show aired on the Special Broadcasting Service (SBS). Produced by BBC Studios Australia and New Zealand, the series is based on the original British game show of the same name created by Bill Wright. The show features an intimidating setting with challenging questions on specialised subjects of the contestant's choice, followed by a general knowledge round.

== History ==
The program was first announced in March 2019, with Jennifer Byrne hosting the first two seasons of the show. The show was temporarily hosted by Marc Fennell for a period of about two weeks after Byrne had a fall that left her with injuries to her wrist and face.

The finals of the second season were delayed by nearly a year due to the COVID-19 pandemic, returning in February 2021.

Fennell took over as host of the show from the third season, which began that same month.

Two seasons of Celebrity Mastermind have also been produced.

The sixth season of Mastermind Australia premiered on 25 March 2024. The first week features all four living past champions of the series as well as other TV quiz champions competing for a bespoke trophy dedicated to season 2 winner Jacqui Markham, who died in 2023.

A seventh season was confirmed at the SBS Upfronts event in October 2024, set to air in 2025.

== Format ==
Standard episodes consist of two rounds. In the first round, each contender will have two minutes to answer as many questions as possible about their chosen specialist subject. In the second round, contestants face 90 seconds of general knowledge questions. There are four contestants in each episode from Monday to Thursday, and the winner of each episode competes in the weekly final on Friday, in order to advance to the semi-final.

Weekly finals episodes place the general knowledge round first, followed by a Slow Burn round (from Season 2 onwards), unique to the Australian version. In Slow Burn, each contestant must pick a category from the four available. They are then presented ten clues, one at a time. The contestant can only make one guess. The earlier they answer, the more points they earn; ten points if they answer after the first clue, minus one for each clue they hear afterwards before answering. Zero points are earned if the answer is wrong.

The grand final episode of each season is 60 minutes long, instead of the usual 30 minutes, and consists of three rounds: A new specialist subject for each contestant, a Slow Burn round, and finally a general knowledge round. The winner of the grand final, and the season, is awarded a handcrafted, etched glass bowl, made by Indigenous Australian artist Dennis Golding.

== Episodes ==
Series	Episodes	Originally released	
Series	Episodes	First released	Last released
1	85	15 April 2019	27 September 2019 (Note: Episodes were temporarily paused for most of June and July due to SBS airing the FIFA Women's World Cup and Tour de France.)
2	85	24 February 2020	19 February 2021 (Note: The finals were delayed significantly due to the COVID-19 pandemic.)
3	85	22 February 2021	18 June 2021
4	85	21 February 2022	17 June 2022
5	86	13 February 2023	9 June 2023
6	85	25 March 2024	19 July 2024
7	85	24 March 2025	18 July 2025
8	85	6 April 2026	31 July 2026

== Champions ==
Regular series
Year	Winner	Specialist subjects		
Year	Winner	Heat	Semi-final	Final
2019	Troy Eggleston	Don Bradman	World Chess Championships	Melbourne Cup winners
2020–21	Jacqui Markham	Australia in the 2019 Netball World Cup	The West Wing, seasons 1-3	The Princess Bride
2021	William Laing	The Flashman Papers	The novels of John Wyndham	C.S. Lewis' The Space Trilogy
2022	Stirling Coates	For Your Eyes Only	White Lies	The Incredibles and Incredibles 2
2023	Miles Glaspole	Tears for Fears	Dark	AFL Grand Finals from 2000 to 2022
2024	Mickey Logue	Canberra Raiders: 1989–1999	Socceroos at the World Cup: 2006–2022	Men Behaving Badly
2025	Robbie Miles	Jack Parlabane novels by Christopher Brookmyre	Films of Kevin Smith	Preacher comics
2026	Ante Malenica	History of the Croatia national football team at the FIFA World Cup	Thirty Years' War	Golden State Warriors of the 2010s

Champions week
Year	Finalists (winner in bold)	Specialist subject(s)
2024	Troy Eggleston; William Laing; Stirling Coates; **Miles Glaspole**	NRL State of Origin 1985–2005; The life and career of Doc Evatt; Johannes Vermeer; Sparks
