= Bunty Bubbly Ki Mummy =

Indian television series

- Genre: Serial drama
- Directed by: Bikramjeet Singh Bhullar
- Starring: See below
- Country of origin: India
- Original language: Hindi

Production
- Running time: Approx. 23 mins

Original release
- Network: DD National
- Release: 2011

Bunty Bubbly Ki Mummy is an Indian television series which aired on DD National. The series stars Benjamin Gilani and Grusha Kapoor in the main lead. It was directed by Bikramjeet Singh Bhullar and produced by Grusha Kapoor.

== Synopsis ==
The story is centred on two families, one is of Suman's (Grusha Kapoor) and other her step mother. Suman's father left a piece of land without declaring any bequest before his death and the two families fight.

== Cast ==
Artists	Characters
Grusha Kapoor	Suman
Benjamin Gilani	Prashant (Suman's husband)
Master Ujjwal	Bunty (Suman's son)
Isha Mishra	Bubbly (Suman's daughter)
