= Aidan McQuade =

Aidan Joseph McQuade is a former Director (Chief Executive) of Anti-Slavery International from 2006-2017.

He comes from South Armagh, Northern Ireland.

McQuade is a contributor to The Guardian, Equal Times and The Independent on issues of slavery, forced labour and related matters. In 2013 he highlighted the need for slavery eradication to be made a post-2015 Sustainable Development Goal. In 2014 he called for greater regulation of international business to reduce slavery in global supply chains. In an article for The Independent in March 2015 he accused Sepp Blatter of FIFA of moral responsibility for the death and enslavement of South Asian construction workers preparing Qatar for the 2022 World Cup.

In 2012/13, he won the BBC's Mastermind Quiz with specialist subject, Abraham Lincoln. When asked about the stress of the quiz, MacQuade replied "It takes as much energy to think as to panic".

He received an honorary OBE for his work in anti-slavery in 2017, which he returned in 2024 in response to government policies, in particular the plan to send some asylum seekers to Rwanda
