= Nancy Wilkinson =

British game show contestant (1919–1999)

Nancy Barbara Constance Wilkinson (née Bird; 29 September 1919 – 21 November 1999) was the winner of the first series of the BBC television quiz show Mastermind in 1972.

Wilkinson was born in London in 1919. She studied modern languages and music at Cambridge from 1937 to 1941, and during World War II worked for the intelligence service at Bletchley Park. On 13 July 1945 she married John Wilkinson, and after some years in Cornwall they lived in Kingston, Cambridgeshire, for the rest of her life. She taught at the Cambridgeshire College of Arts and Technology (now the Anglia Ruskin University).

She was a member of the General Synod of the Church of England from its inception in 1970 until 1989.

In the 1972 Mastermind series her specialised subjects were French literature, European antiques, and the history of music 1550–1900. In 1975 she went on to win a Supermind contest between the first four Mastermind champions.

Wilkinson died in 1999 at the age of 80.
