= Richard Glover (radio presenter) =

Australian talk radio personality

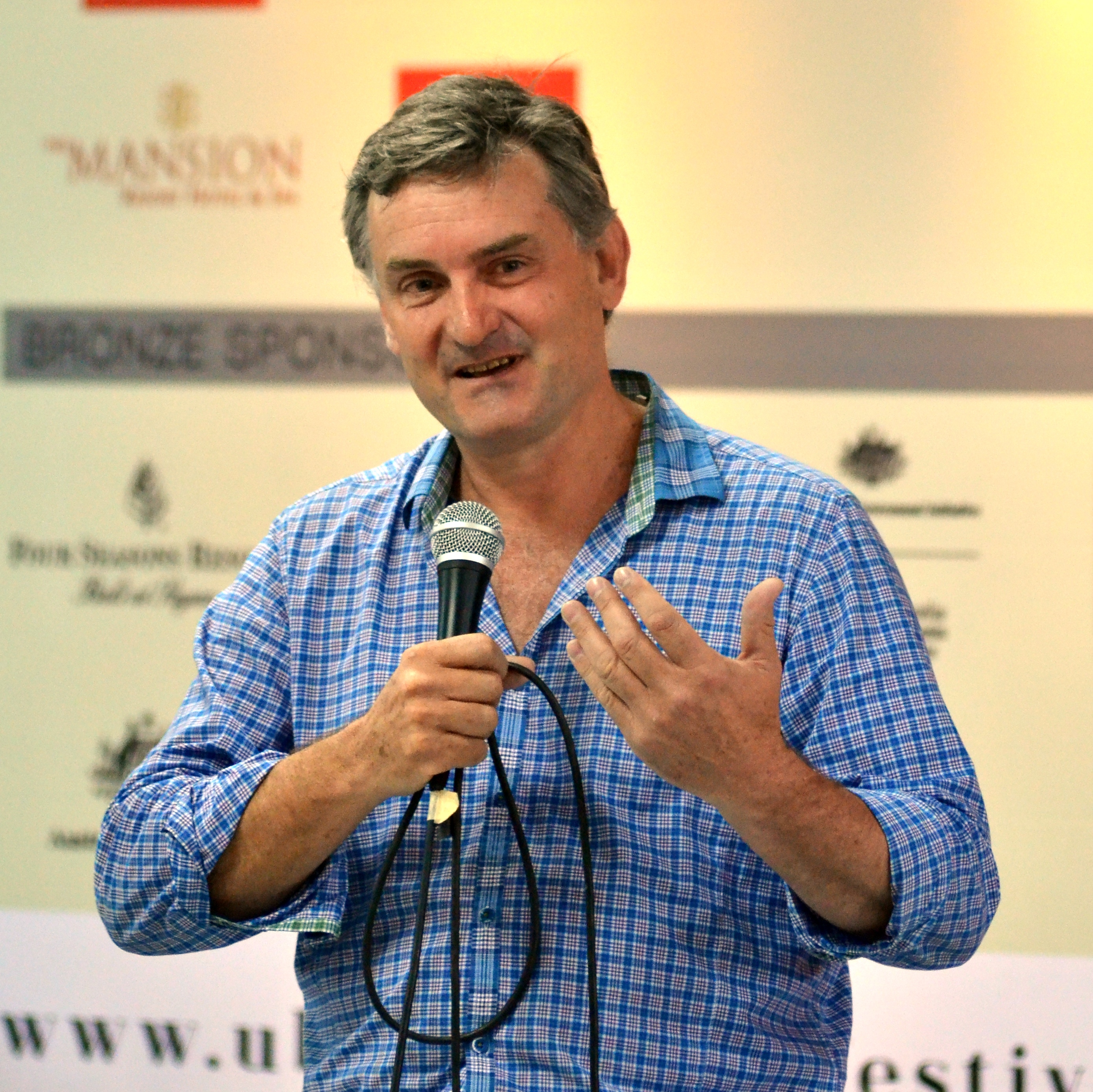
- Glover at the Ubud Writers & Readers Festival 2012
- Occupations: Radio presenter, journalist, author
- Employer(s): Australian Broadcasting Corporation; Sydney Morning Herald

Richard Glover is an Australian journalist and author. He is best known as presenter of the drive program on ABC Radio Sydney. His book Flesh Wounds was voted one of the top five books of 2015 by viewers of ABC television's The Book Club and was Readers Choice Award winner as Biography of the Year in the 2016 Australian Book Industry Awards.

== Education ==
Glover has a Bachelor of Arts from University of Sydney.

== Career ==
Glover used to present the radio show Drive from Monday to Friday, 3.30pm to 6.30 pm on ABC Radio Sydney. He joined ABC Radio Sydney in January 1996, taking over the Drive segment from Mike Carlton. In 2004 he was awarded the Broadcaster of the Year Award for ABC local radio.

Glover is also a newspaper journalist. His weekly humour column has appeared in the Sydney Morning Herald since 1985. He has also worked as that paper's news editor, arts editor and European correspondent.

In December 2011, Glover and Peter FitzSimons achieved a record for the world's longest radio interview, supervised by Guinness World Records.

In October 2024, Glover announced that he would be leaving ABC Radio Sydney in November after 26 years with the broadcaster. Australian Prime Minister Anthony Albanese called Glover on his final show to congratulate him and said "As an interviewer you have incredible skill".

== Political views ==
Glover is an atheist, and says he "never managed a speck of interest in religion" but believes Christianity and religion should be tolerated by non-believers. In 2015, he wrote that "Marketplace economics is now the God of our time, and its priests are Microsoft, Apple and Google". Glover supports same-sex marriage in Australia, which he says will be "entirely positive".

== Books ==
- (1990) Grin and bear it: a survivor's guide to marriage, kids, family holidays, home renovations, the English and other horrors (ISBN 0731801814)
- (1992) The P-plate parent (with Angela Webber) (ISBN 1863731989)
- (1993) Laughing stock: one man's battle with sex, work and a son called Batboy (ISBN 1863735658)
- (1994) (with Angela Webber)The joy of blokes: a survivor's guide to the men in your life, how to meet them, how to love them, how to eat their cooking (ISBN 1863737529)
- (1998) Maps, dreams, history: race and representation in Aboriginal Australia
- (2000) In bed with Jocasta (ISBN 0732268648)
- (2004) The dag's dictionary: a humorous book of words that should exist, but don't (ISBN 0733314368)
- (2005) Desperate husbands (ISBN 0732282500)
- (2009) The mud house: four friends, one block of land, no power tools (ISBN 9780732290290)
- (2010) Why men are necessary and other news from nowhere (ISBN 9780733329159)
- (2013) George Clooney's haircut and other cries for help (ISBN 9781460700303)
- (2015) Flesh wounds (ISBN 9780733334320)
- (2018) Land before avocado: journeys in a lost Australia (ISBN 9780733339813)
- (2020) Love, Clancy: a dog's letters home (ISBN 9780733341069)
- (2023) Best Wishes (ISBN 9780733343100)

== Children's books ==
- (2003) The dirt experiment (ISBN 0733616208)
- (2007) The joke trap (ISBN 9780733320552
- (2011) The no-minute noodler: dag's dictionary for kids (e-book) (ISBN 9780730497035
