= Robin Auld =

Robin Auld may refer to:

- Robin Auld (judge)
- Robin Auld (musician)
