= Benjamin Gilani =

Indian actor

Benjamin Gilani is an Indian film, television and stage actor who works in Hindi cinema.

== Early life and career ==
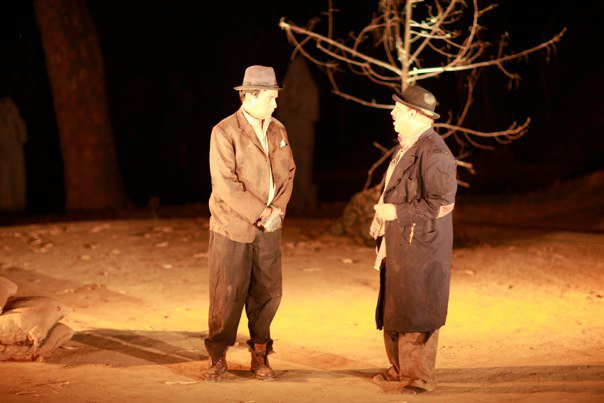
Gilani playing Estragon in Waiting for Godot at the Doon School in 2011

Gilani did his schooling at Bishop Cotton School, Shimla. He is a postgraduate from Delhi University having studied and taught English literature at St. Stephen's College, Delhi and studied at Film and Television Institute of India (FTII) Pune class of 1972, where Naseeruddin Shah and Tom Alter were his classmates.

He founded 'Motleys Productions', a Mumbai-based theatre company in 1977, along with Tom Alter and Naseeruddin Shah, and Waiting For Godot was their first play on 29 July 1979 at Prithvi Theatre. The play was revived in 2009 for the group's 30th anniversary celebrations.

== Partial filmography ==
=== Films ===
Year	Film	Role
2020	Music School	
2018	Haaye Dil	
2018	Laila Majnu	Ghulam Sarwar Bhat
2016	BHK Bhalla@Halla.Kom	
2015	Bajirao Mastani	Maharaja Chhatrasal
2015	Jai Ho Democracy	Gen. G. S. Sandhu
2013	Rise of the Zombie	
2011	Game	Mr. Khanna
2009	8 x 10 Tasveer	Jatin Puri
2009	Barah Aana	Mr. Mehta
2005	Waqt: The Race Against Time	Film Director
2003	Main Madhuri Dixit Banna Chahti Hoon	
1994	Abhay	
1993	Sardar	Jawaharlal Nehru
1985	Mirch Masala	School Master
1985	Damad Chahiye	Vinod Singhal
1983	Kalka	Dr Pai
1981	Plot No. 5	Rahul
1978	Junoon	Rashid Khan
1978	Devata	Shekhar
1977	Alaap	Kishan

=== TV Series ===
Year	Title	Role	Notes
1982	Batain Filmon Ki	as Anchor	DD National
1985–1987	Kathasagar		DD National
1993-1994	The Great Maratha	Nawab Shuja Ud Daula	DD Metro
1993–1997	Tara	Prithvi Kanchan twin's boyfriend	Zee TV
1993	Anand	Anand	Zee TV
	Rishtey		Zee TV
	Tujhpe Dil Qurbaan		Sony
2002	Aamrapali	Played Aamrapali's father	Doordarshan
2004	Sahib Biwi Gulam		Sahara One
	Junoon		DD National
	Bhootnath	Bhootnath	DD National
	Hum 2 Hain Na	Anand Dhanrajgir	Sony Entertainment Television
2005–2006	Hotel Kingston	Govind Sahai	
2011–2012	Bunty Bubbly Ki Mummy	Prashant	
2011	Shama	Jamaal	
	Kaun		
	Disney Q Family Mastermind	Host	
	Ank Ajoobe		Doordarshan
2022	Guilty Minds	Munnawar Quaze	Amazon Prime Video series
2022	Hush Hush (TV series)	Baldev	Amazon Prime Video series
