= Jennifer Byrne =

Australian journalist

- Born: 5 March 1955 (age 71); Melbourne, Victoria, Australia
- Occupations: Journalist, television presenter, former book publisher
- Years active: 1971–present
- Television: This Day Tonight; Nationwide; Sunday; 60 Minutes; Foreign Correspondent; We Can Be Heroes; First Tuesday Book Club; Jennifer Byrne Presents; The Project; Mastermind
- Spouses: David Margan (diss.); Andrew Denton
- Children: Connor (born 1994)
- Relatives: Sir Dallas Brooks (grandfather)
- Awards: Logie (1985)

Jennifer Victoria Byrne (born 5 March 1955) is an Australian journalist, television presenter and former book publisher. She hosted the monthly ABC television program The Book Club, originally titled First Tuesday Book Club.

== Early life ==
Byrne was born in Melbourne, Australia, and attended St Margaret's School as a boarding student.

== Career ==
Byrne began her career in journalism at the age of 16, as a cadet at Melbourne's The Age newspaper. When she was 23, she became the paper's San Francisco correspondent and later a feature writer.

Byrne's television work began as a researcher for This Day Tonight's Melbourne unit and later as a reporter for Nationwide. After returning to print media as assistant-editor of The Age's "Monthly Review", she moved back to television in 1982, on Nine Network's Sunday program. On Sunday, in 1985, she won a Logie for her story on Paul Keating's tax summit. From 1986 to 1993, Byrne worked on the Nine Network's current affairs program 60 Minutes. She has also presented ABC TV's Foreign Correspondent. In 2005, Byrne narrated the ABC mockumentary television show We Can Be Heroes. Starting in 2006, she hosted First Tuesday Book Club, a panel book review program on ABC, alongside regular commentators Marieke Hardy and Jason Steger. The series was later renamed The Book Club and concluded in 2017. A spin-off series of specials from this program is titled Jennifer Byrne Presents.

In the mid-1990s, Byrne worked as a publishing director at Reed Books. In 2008, she joined ABC NewsRadio to work as a co-host during the evening drive slot (4–7 pm). In recent times, Byrne has been a regular panellist on Network Ten's The Project and has guest-starred on an episode of Talkin' 'Bout Your Generation.

In 2019, Byrne began hosting the Australian version of Mastermind and its celebrity edition. She left the role in 2020, with Marc Fennell replacing her.

Byrne currently is the voice of 10 News First, doing the voice-overs for bulletin intros and promotions.

== Personal life ==
Byrne is married to comedian and independent film producer Andrew Denton, with whom she has one son. Byrne and Denton live in Sydney's Surry Hills. She is the granddaughter of Sir Dallas Brooks, a former Governor of Victoria and past Grand Master of Freemasonry. Byrne was married to fellow journalist David Margan during the 1990s.
