= Mischa Merz =

Australian boxer, painter and journalist

Mischa Merz (born 1964) is an Australian boxer, painter and the owner of Mischa's Boxing Central in Footscray where she has been head coach since 2013. She became part of a pioneering cohort of female boxers when she started competing in 1998 long before women were included in the Olympics. Over the years she has been determined to help grow the female branch of the sport and has prepared and coached women and girls to enter competition as well as men.

== Career ==
Merz won an Australian Amateur Boxing League national title in 2000 and silver in her first year of competing 1998 and in 2001 in Mackay Queensland. She resumed boxing in the Masters Division in the United States in 2009 where she won the National Women's Golden Gloves. She also won her fights at the Georgia Games and the Ringside World Championships, taking home the belt in the Masters Division at that tournament. Her last fight was in New York's famous Gleason's Gym in 2011 where she lost a close decision against Natalie Davila.

== Bibliography ==
- Bruising: A Journey Through Gender (Pan Macmillan Australia, 2000)
- Bruising: A Boxer's Story (second edition) (Vulgar Press, 2009)
- The Sweetest Thing (Seven Stories Press, 2011)
