= Turner Museum of Glass =

Glass museum at the University of Sheffield

Coordinates: 53.3817°N 1.4773°W

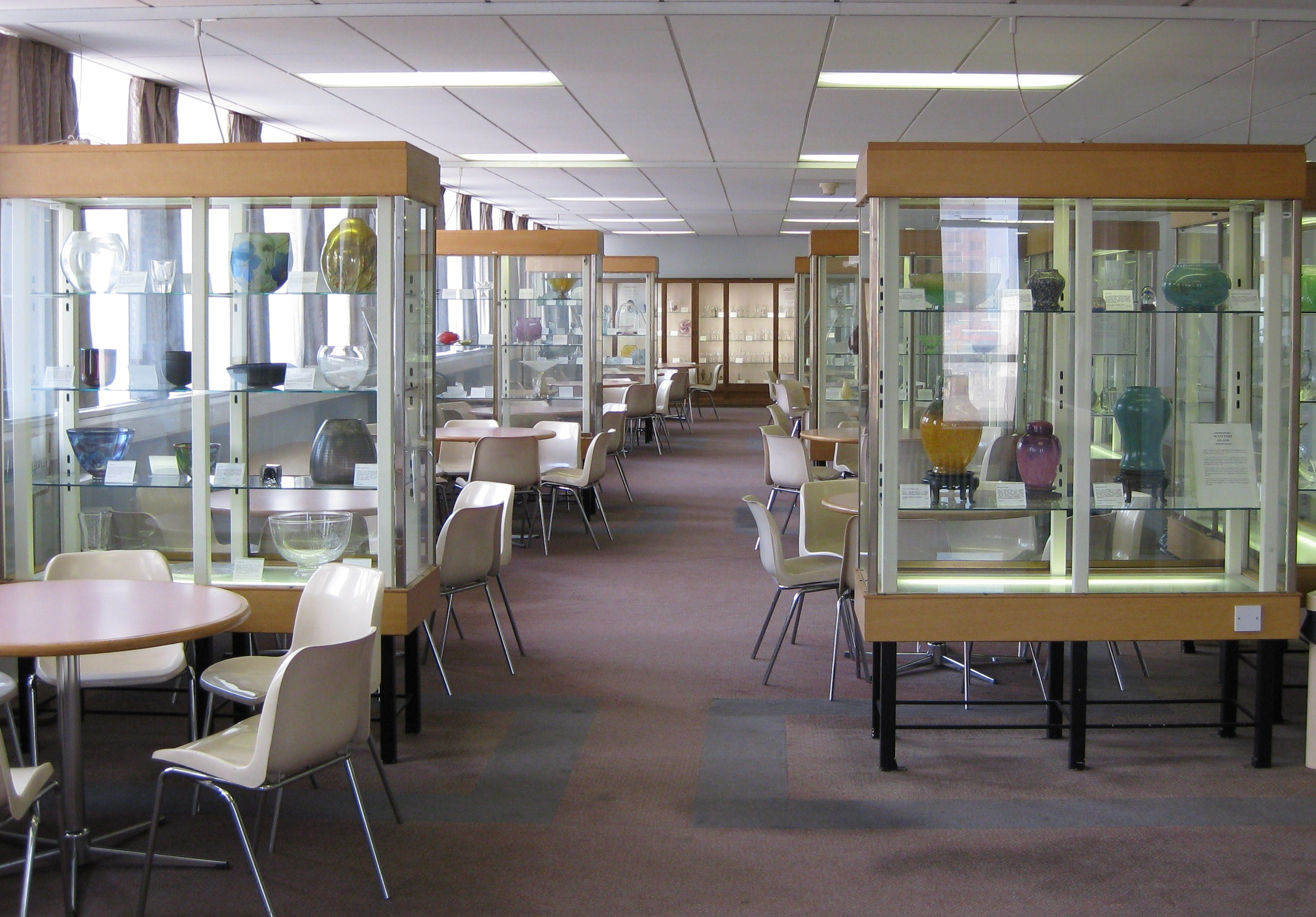
Museum viewed from coffee bar end

The Turner Museum of Glass is housed in the Department of Materials Science and Engineering at the University of Sheffield, in England. It is in the Sir Robert Hadfield Building with the entrance from Portobello Street. It contains examples from ancient Egypt and Rome but mainly from major European and American glassworkers, with a particular focus on those from the 1920s to 1950s.

It was founded in 1943 by Professor W. E. S. Turner of the university, who additionally was the senior author on many papers on glass technology. One of the exhibits is the wedding dress of his wife Helen Monro Turner (Helen Nairn, married 1 July 1943) which is made of glass fibre, as are the matching shoes. This has been selected as one of the items in the BBC's extended collection based on A History of the World in 100 Objects.
