= Celebrity Mastermind Australia =

Australian television show

- Genre: Game show
- Created by: Bill Wright
- Presented by: Jennifer Byrne (2020); Marc Fennell (2021)
- Country of origin: Australia
- Original language: English
- No. of series: 2
- No. of episodes: 10

Production
- Running time: 60 minutes

Original release
- Network: SBS
- Release: 15 February 2020 – 25 September 2021

Celebrity Mastermind is an Australian television quiz show aired on the Special Broadcasting Service (SBS). A spin-off of Mastermind, the series is produced by BBC Studios and is based on the original British game show of the same name created by Bill Wright. The show features an intimidating setting with challenging questions on specialised subjects of the contestant's choice, followed by "slow burn" question and a general knowledge round.

The program was first announced in November 2019, with Jennifer Byrne hosting the first season of the show. Fennell took over as host of the show from the second season, which began in August 2021.

== Format ==
Episodes consist of three rounds, lining up with the grand final of the original Australian version. In the first round, each contender will have two minutes to answer as many questions as possible about their chosen specialist subject.

The second round, Slow Burn, unique to the Australian version. In Slow Burn, each contestant is assigned a category; they are then presented ten clues, one at a time. The contestant can only make one guess, and the earlier they answer, the more points they earn; ten points if they answer after the first clue, less one for each clue they hear afterwards before answering. Zero points are earned if the answer is wrong. In the third round, contestants face 90 seconds of general knowledge questions.

== Episodes ==
=== Overview ===
Series	Episodes	Originally released	
Series	Episodes	First released	Last released
1	5	15 February 2020	21 March 2020
2	5	28 August 2021	25 September 2021

=== Series 1 (2020) ===
Episode	Airdate	Contestants			
1	15 February 2020	Nazeem Hussain	Alex Lee	Adam Spencer	Marc Fennell
2	22 February 2020	Courtney Act	Sam Simmons	Jessica Rowe	Adam Liaw
3	7 March 2020	Tom Ballard	Merrick Watts	Elaine Crombie	Lucy Zelić
4	14 March 2020	Joel Creasey	Mark Humphries	Myf Warhurst	Nikki Osborne
F	21 March 2020	Adam Spencer	Adam Liaw	Tom Ballard	Mark Humphries

=== Series 2 (2021) ===
Episode	Airdate	Contestants			
1	28 August 2021	James Mathison	Hans	John Wood	Patricia Karvelas
2	4 September 2021	Zoë Coombs Marr	Mark Olive	Ian 'Dicko' Dickson	Richard Reid
3	11 September 2021	Murray Cook	Dilruk Jayasinha	Pettifleur Berenger	Ben Lee
4	18 September 2021	Shane Gould	Tanya Hennessy	Prinnie Stevens	Phil Burton
F	25 September 2021	Hans	Richard Reid	Murray Cook	Phil Burton
