= Di Morrissey =

Australian writer

Di Morrissey AM
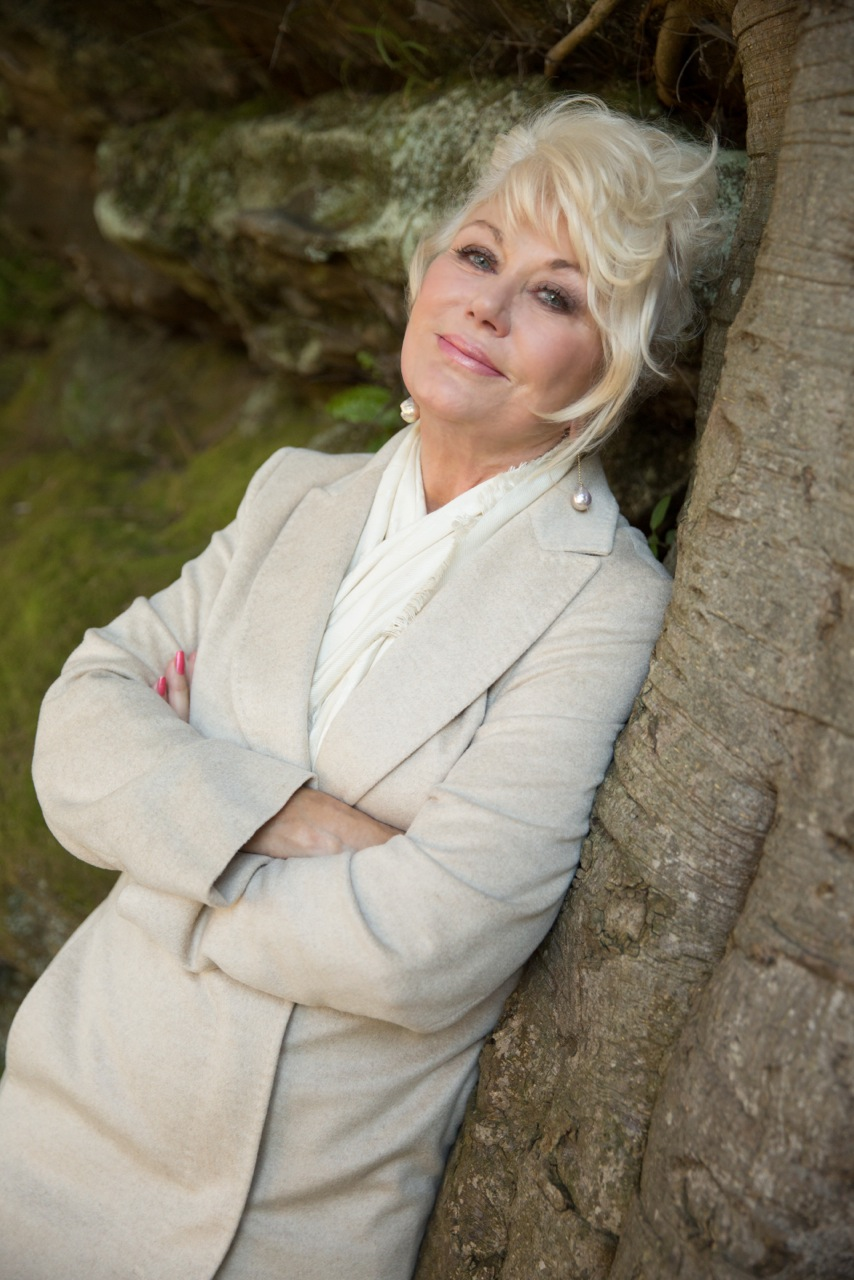
- Born: Grace Diane Cairns; 1948 (age 77–78); Australia
- Occupation: Writer
- Writing career
- Language: English
- Genre: Fiction
- Subject: Australian fiction
- Website: www.dimorrissey.com.au

Di Morrissey AM (born Grace Diane Cairns, 1948) is an Australian novelist.

== Early life ==
Di Morrissey was born in 1948 to Kay and Len Cairns in Wingham, New South Wales, named Grace Diane Cairns. At the age of five, she moved with her family to the remote surrounds of Pittwater, north of Sydney. As a child, she counted famous Australian actor Chips Rafferty as a close mentor and friend, who helped provide for her and her mother after the death of her stepfather and half-brother when she was a child and helped raise funds to send them overseas to California to live with family.

Her mother, Kay Roberts, became Australia's first female commercial TV director working at Artransa Studios, Australian Film Commission and Film Australia.

== Career ==
Although wanting to be a novelist since she was a young girl, Morrissey started writing as a cadet on The Australian Women's Weekly magazine at age 17. Later she worked as a journalist on Northcliffe Newspapers on London's Fleet Street for several years.

She then married US diplomat Peter Morrissey and lived in Hawaii, where she had her own morning TV show for KGMB and appeared in several episodes of the CBS TV series Hawaii Five-O, starring Jack Lord. The couple lived in various countries in South East Asia and Guyana before Morrissey returned to Australia on her own. She became one of the original presenters on Australia's first national current affairs Breakfast TV show, Good Morning Australia, with Gordon Elliott, which premiered on Network Ten in 1981.

In 1989 she left TV to write her first novel, Heart of the Dreaming, which was published in 1991 and became a best-seller, establishing a demand for Australian-based stories.

She is an environmentalist and activist. All her novels are inspired by landscape with environmental, political and cultural issues woven into mass market popular fiction. Following her support of Aung San Suu Kyi, she travelled to Burma (Myanmar) in 2011 and published her book The Golden Land in 2012. She has subsequently established The Golden Land Education Foundation and raises funds for the school she has established outside Mandalay.

In 2015 she launched The Manning Community News, a monthly newspaper covering local news in the Manning Valley, New South Wales.

== Awards and honours ==
In May 2017 Morrissey was inducted into the Australian Book Industry Awards (ABIA) Hall of Fame, and given the Lloyd O’Neil Award for service to the Australian book industry, presented by her old friend and fellow author Tom Keneally.

Morrissey was made a Member of the Order of Australia (AM) in the 2019 Queen's Birthday Honours in recognition of her "significant service to literature as a novelist, and to conservation and the environment".

== Bibliography ==
- Heart of the Dreaming 1991
- The Last Rose of Summer 1992
- Follow The Morning Star 1993
- The Last Mile Home 1994
- Tears of the Moon 1995
- When the Singing Stops 1996
- The Songmaster 1997
- Scatter the Stars 1998
- Blaze 1999
- The Bay 2001
- Kimberley Sun 2002
- Barra Creek 2003
- The Reef 2004
- The Valley 2006
- Monsoon 2007
- The Islands 2008
- The Silent Country 2009
- The Plantation 2010
- The Opal Desert 2011
- The Golden Land 2012
- The Winter Sea 2013
- The Road Back 2014
- Rain Music 2015
- A Distant Journey 2016
- The Red Coast 2017
- Arcadia 2018
- The Last Paradise 2019
- Before the Storm 2020
- The Night Tide 2022
- River Song 2024
- The Endless Sky 2025

== Children's books ==
- Buster and the Queen Bee (Angus and Robertson) 2000
- Sonoma Meets Miss Mouse (Harbour Publishing) 2014
- Everton and Will (Harbour Publishing) 2015
- Surfer Boy Bo (Harbour Publishing) 2016
- Ula's Magic Island (Harbour Publishing) 2017
