= Jason Steger =

Australian journalist

Jason Steger (born 1956) is a British-born Australian journalist, working in both print and film media. He was the literary editor of the Melbourne broadsheet The Age from 2000 until 20 September 2024. He was one of three regular commentators on ABC TV's The Book Club.

== Life in England ==
Steger was born in Wimbledon, London, England, in 1956. He attended the University of Kent where he earned a Bachelor of Arts with Honours, before beginning his career as a journalist on London's Financial Times in 1980.

== Life in Australia ==
Steger relocated to Melbourne, Australia, in 1987, where he worked as a journalist for The Herald before moving to The Sunday Age in 1990. He became literary editor of both The Age and The Sunday Age in 2000, as part of which he contributes a weekly column to the "Spectrum" section of The Age each Saturday, summarising the latest news from both the local and international literary communities.

In 2006, Steger joined Marieke Hardy and Jennifer Byrne as one of the three regular panellists on the First Tuesday Book Club, a television book review program broadcast by the ABC. Because the series allows for discussion of classic books as well as more recent releases, Steger has seized the opportunity to express his love of literature from a personal, even sentimental perspective, that the focus by The Age on contemporary literature does not generally allow. For example, when he was asked to select a novel for the group to discuss, he chose Alain-Fournier's classic Le Grand Meaulnes, not because of its literary merit or contemporary relevance, but because it is one of the books that has been most influential on his development as a person.
