= W. E. S. Turner =

British chemist (1881–1963)

- Born: William Ernest Stephen Turner; 22 September 1881
- Died: 27 October 1963 (aged 82)
- Education: University of Birmingham
- Awards: Fellow of the Royal Society

William Ernest Stephen Turner (22 September 1881 – 27 October 1963) was a British chemist and pioneer of scientific glass technology.

== Biography ==
Turner was born in Wednesbury, Staffordshire on 22 September 1881. He went to King Edward VI Grammar School, Five Ways, Birmingham, and achieved a BSc (1902) and MSc (1904) in chemistry at the University of Birmingham.

He married Mary Isobell Marshall (died 1939) and they had 4 children.

In 1904, he joined the University College of Sheffield as a lecturer, and, in 1915, established the Department of Glass Manufacture, becoming in 1916 the Department of Glass Technology. He remained as its head until his retirement in 1945.

In 1943, he married Helen Nairn Munro, an artist noted for her glass engraving, and a teacher of glass decoration at the Edinburgh College of Art. She was provided with a blue dress and shoes in glass fibre cloth (which was then an unusual industrial material). This has been selected as one of the items in the BBC's A History of the World in 100 Objects. The same year, he established a collection of historical and modern glass which became the Turner Museum of Glass from his extensive collection, and the wedding dress is on display there.

He died on 27 October 1963.

== Work ==
=== Publications ===
From 1904 to 1914, he published 21 papers on physical chemistry, mainly on molecular weights in solution. However, the bulk of his work from 1917 to 1954 was on the chemistry and technology of glass. Following his retirement, he produced an extensive series on the history of glass technology and on glass in archeology. Apart from this, in 1909, he wrote a series of articles in the Sheffield Daily Telegraph about the scientist in industry, in which cooperation with universities was urged.

=== Research ===
His early career was strictly academic, largely dealing with the associations of molecules in the liquid state. However, as his articles in the local newspaper showed, he was interested in the application of science to practical industrial problems, and this became the main theme of his work. The beginning of the First World War cut off metallurgical supplies from Germany and Austria, and Turner proposed that the University should help British industry. The work in metallurgy led to enquiries about glass, and in 1915 Turner produced a 'Report on the glass industry of Yorkshire', noting that this was largely unscientific and rule of thumb in nature. He thereby persuaded the University to set up a Department of Glass Manufacture in 1915 for research and teaching where he remained for the rest of his career, becoming internationally known. The main thrust of his research was on a fundamental understanding of the relationship between the chemical composition and the working properties of glasses.

In 1916, he founded the Society of Glass Technology, becoming its first secretary. It published a Journal, which he edited until 1951. He was also involved in the formation of the International Commission on Glass.

=== Teaching ===
Turner initially taught physical chemistry, and in 1905 started specific courses for metallurgists. This involvement led him to become President of the Sheffield Society of Applied Metallurgy in 1914. In 1915, the Department of Glass Manufacture began an outreach programme, providing short courses to industry in Mexborough, Barnsley, Castleford and Knottingley in addition to Saturday classes in Sheffield. These were extended to glass making centres in Derby, Alloa, Glasgow and London. From 1917, full-time day students entered for what became a Bachelor of Technical Science degree. During the Second World War, Turner and other staff of the department provided technical lectures to industries such as those making glass electronic vacuum tubes.

== Honours ==
He was appointed an Officer of the Order of the British Empire in the 1919 New Year Honours for application of science to the glass industry, and in 1938 was appointed a Fellow of the Royal Society. He was the only person outside Germany to receive the Otto Schott Medal.
