= Helen Monro Turner =

British artist

Helen Monro Turner (16 December 1901–21 September 1977) was a Scottish artist based in Edinburgh. She worked her whole life and pursued careers as a wood cut specialist, glass engraver, illustrator and educator. She helped open and establish the first glass engraving department at Edinburgh College of Art on 8 January 1941. The scale of her work ranged from a single glass or a tiny engraved crystal box to huge architectural commissions such as the windows on the staircase in the National Library of Scotland.

== Background and education ==
Monro Turner was born on 16 December 1901 in Calcutta, India. She then returned to her native Scotland with her family. She went to school at George Watson's Ladies College. Later, she decided to pursue further education at the University of Edinburgh, and received a degree in 1927 from Edinburgh College of Art where she specialised in wood engraving.

In 1938, the Edinburgh College of Art awarded her an Andrew Grant Scholarship and she studied glass making and decorating techniques at the Kunstgewerbeschule in Stuttgart under Professor Wilhelm von Eiff. On 14 August 1939, just when term ended at Stuttgart she felt it seemed advisable to be on the other side of the frontier, and left Stuttgart for Zurich.

In 1943, she married Professor William E.S. Turner, founder of the Turner Museum of Glass at Sheffield University. She wore an unusual wedding dress, hat, handbag and shoes which had been made of glass-fibre in Glasgow. The dress has been selected as one of the items in the BBC's A History of the World in 100 Objects.

== Career ==
After graduating college, Monro Turner found success as a book illustrator. In the years following 1933, she worked with publishers such as Thomas Nelsons & Sons where she illustrated a range of books and designed many book covers. In fact, one of her first major commissions as an illustrator were for the Nelson Classics editions of Alice in Wonderland and Alice Through the Looking-Glass. She also worked for editions of George Dasent's Tales from the Norse, Charles Kingsley's The Heroes, and Alexandre Dumas’ The Count of Monte Cristo, and for the 1948 edition of Michael Fairless's The Roadmender. She also contributed to Robert Kemp's work with jacket designs for whimsical novel The Malacca Cane and his satirical account of the Edinburgh Festival, The Maestro.

Monro Turner began teaching glass engraving at Edinburgh College of Art in 1941 which then expanded into the Studio Glass Department. She was also appointed as a full time instructor at the institute in 1947. By 1965 a furnace was added to the department so that all aspects of glass design and making could be taught. The department was regarded as one of the best equipped and influential departments in this field in the UK, with Monro Turner highly regarded as one of the most significant figures in British 20th century glass.

In 1956 set up the Juniper Green Studio just outside Edinburgh with her former student John Lawrie. In 1977, Helen Monro Turner died and in 2005, John Lawrie retired and the contents of their Juniper Green Studio were sold at auction in Edinburgh. In July 2007, The Scottish Gallery in Edinburgh held the Helen Monro Turner Memorial Exhibition.
