= Desert Dolphin Skatepark =

Skatepark in Khempur, Rajasthan, India

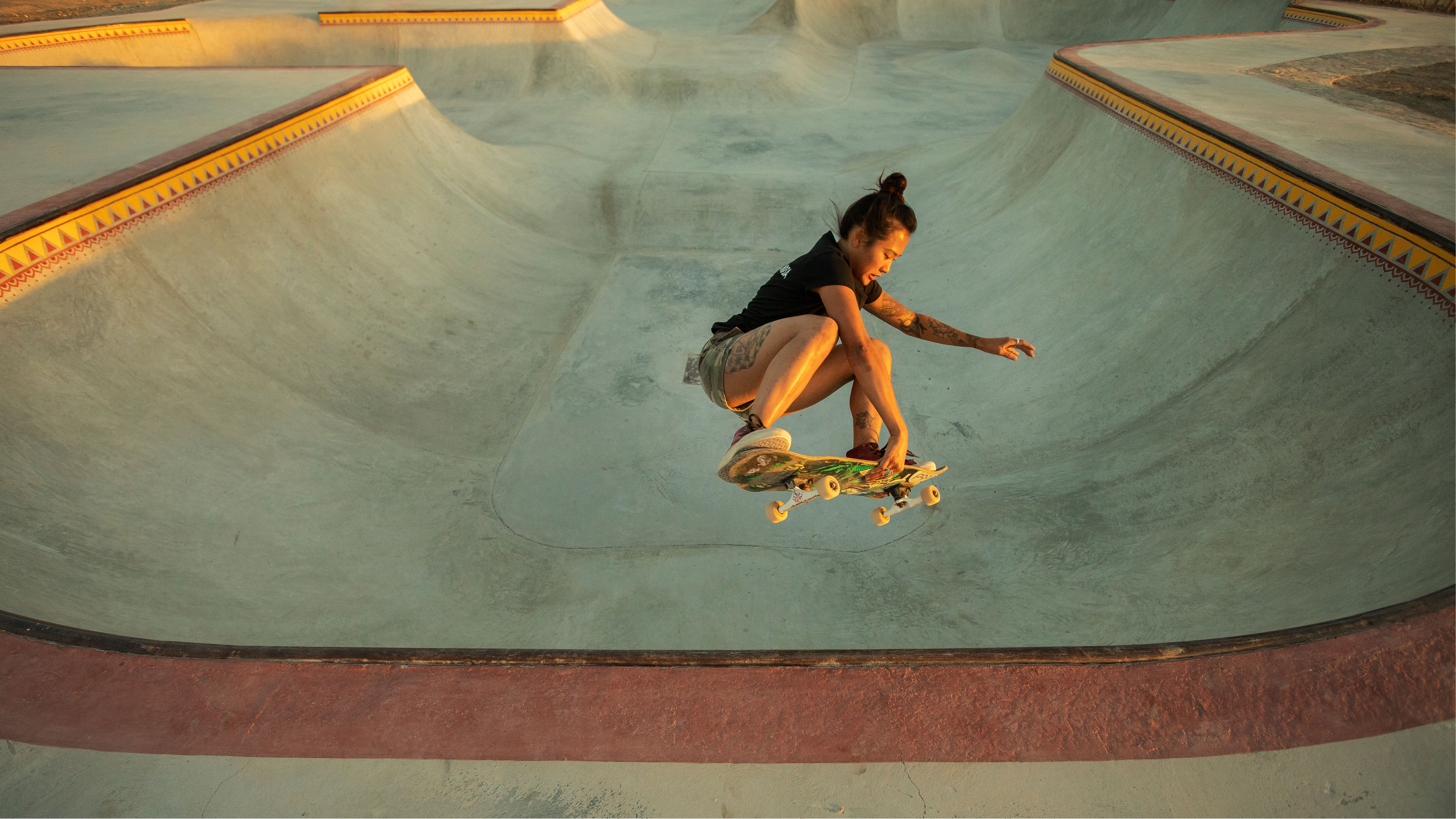
- Interactive map of Desert Dolphin Skatepark
- Type: Skatepark
- Location: Khempur, Rajasthan
- Nearest city: Udaipur
- Coordinates: 24.7519°N 74.0307°E.
- Area: 14,500 Sq. Ft.
- Opened: September 2018
- Operator: Living Grace Foundation
- Open: yes
- Status: Open
- Terrain: Concrete

Desert Dolphin Skatepark is a public skatepark located in Khempur, Rajasthan, India. It was constructed as a part of the Netflix original film Skater Girl and is now run as a public skatepark for the local community. It is one of India's largest skate parks.

== Construction ==
The Skateapark was constructed as a central set for the film Skater Girl. After extensive location scouting, the filmmakers decided to build the skatepark in Khempur, Rajasthan.

The skatepark was built in 45 days over 8 weeks during a challenging monsoon season. Spanning over 14,500 square feet, the skatepark was designed by Holystoked Collective and 100 Ramps to accommodate skaters of all levels and has since become a hub for skateboarding enthusiasts in the region. The construction of the skatepark was driven by the film's narrative, which centers around a young girl's journey of empowerment through skateboarding, It was intentionally developed to provide the local youth with a new avenue for physical activity and creative expression and a means for change. The skatepark remains operational and continues to host various events and competitions, contributing to the growing skateboarding culture in India. The Skatepark facilitates regular volunteer programs

== Social impact ==
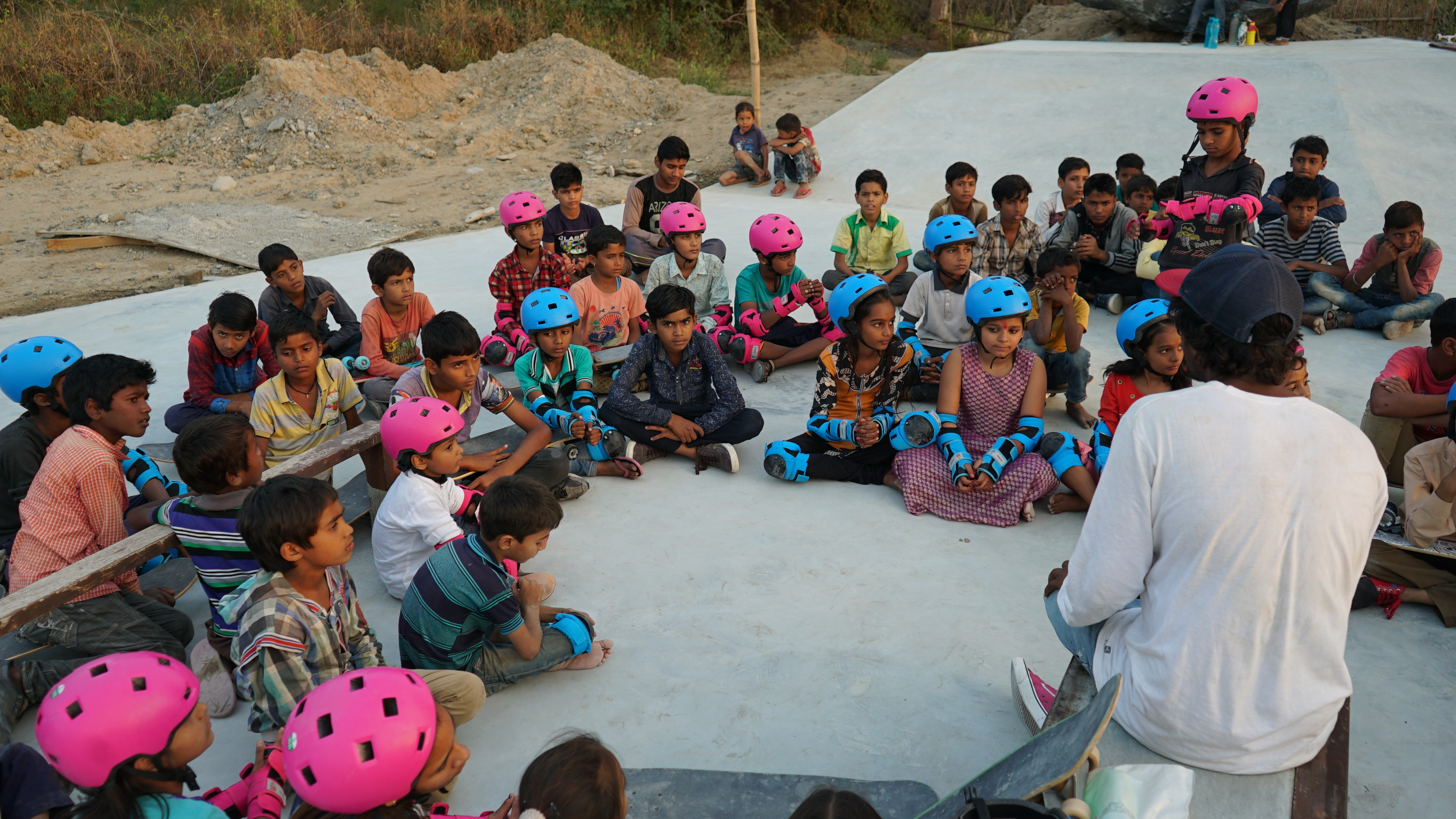
A workshop at the Desert Dolphin Skatepark with Skate Coach Anish Christopher

The social impact of skateboarding continues to positively influence the children of the local villages. The training and the access to a world class facility enabled four skaters from the community to represent Rajasthan in the National Skateboarding Championship in Chandigarh, April 2021. The Desert Dolphin Skatepark continues to impact the lives of children through the many workshops, training and resident volunteers. The skatepark has an ongoing
