= Asha Gond =

Indian skateboarder

- Born: 1998 or 1999 (age 26–27); Janwar, Panna district, Madhya Pradesh, India
- Occupation: Skateboarder Director Barefoot sakteboarders A non profit company.
- Years active: 2017–present
- Known for: Representing India at the 2018 World Skateboarding Championship

Asha Gond is an Indian skateboarder from Madhya Pradesh. She represented India in the 2018 World Skateboarding Championship and leads a non-profit organisation, Barefoot Skateboarders. The 2021 Netflix film, Skater Girl, is believed to be based on her life.

== Early life and career ==
Asha Gond was born to Dharmraj and Kamala Gond in the village of Janwar in Panna district in Madhya Pradesh to a family of farmers. Gond completed her high schooling from Manohar Kanya High School, Janwar and is an Adivasi. When Ulrike Reinhard came up with the idea and created the skatepark in the village in 2015, Gond was one of many children who began to learn and practice skateboarding. The students had no formal training and learned from YouTube videos. Due to the rules laid down by Reinhard, the children were not distracted from their studies, gave girls the first priority with the few skateboards available, and did not discriminate on the basis of caste. Gond still faced insults and threats from her fellow villagers, who believed that she should continue with the regressive traditions imposed on the women of the village.

In 2016, Reinhard helped crowdfund Gond's education in the English language at The Butler Centre for Education in Wantage, Oxfordshire, England, about 24 kilometres (15 mi) from Oxford. Gond had initially dropped out of school after Class XI. She became the first child in her village to travel abroad.

Gond also went on to participate in many national level skateboarding competitions and was India's only female skateboarder at the 2018 World Skateboarding Championship, held in Nanjing, China. She also co-founded and runs Barefoot Skateboarders, a non-profit organisation working to improve the education and development of the children in Janwar village along with two other directors Karan Yadav and Ananya Pratap Singh. She has also been featured skateboarding in a TV advertisement for tyres.

Following the release of the trailer of Skater Girl, netizens familiar with the story of Reinhard and Gond found striking similarities between the movie and Gond's life. While Gond was interviewed as part of the production of the film, director Manjari Makijany denied that the movie was about Gond.
