= Skater Girl =

2021 film by Manjari Makijany

- Official release poster
- Directed by: Manjari Makijany
- Written by: Manjari Makijany; Vinati Makijany
- Produced by: Manjari Makijany; Vinati Makijany; Emmanuel Pappas
- Starring: Rachel Sanchita Gupta; Shafin Patel; Amrit Maghera; Jonathan Readwin; Waheeda Rehman
- Cinematography: Manjari Makijany; G. Monic Kumar; Alan Poon
- Edited by: Deepa Bhatia
- Music by: Salim–Sulaiman
- Production companies: Skatepark Films; Mac Productions
- Distributed by: Netflix
- Release date: 11 June 2021
- Running time: 107 minutes
- Countries: India; United States
- Languages: Hindi; English
- Budget: $10 million

Skater Girl is a 2021 coming-of-age sports drama film directed by Manjari Makijany. The cast includes newcomers Rachel Sanchita Gupta and Shafin Patel, and also stars Amrit Maghera, Jonathan Readwin and Waheeda Rehman. It was written by Manjari Makijany and Vinati Makijany, who co-produced the film through their Indian production company Mac Productions. It was released on 11 June 2021 by Netflix to critical acclaim.

== Plot ==
In the remote village of Khempur, where life is governed by tradition and societal norms, Prerna, a teenage girl, who was obedient and respectful of her family's expectations, but with a spark of curiosity, desires for something more.

Jessica, a British-Indian woman, arrives in the village to explore her late father’s roots. She is fascinated by the simplicity of village life and begins to connect with the local children. Jessica’s clothes get dirty when a young boy, Ankush, involved in a scuffle with a schoolmate, accidentally throws cow dung onto her shirt. Ankush is the younger brother of Prerna. Prerna takes Jessica to a water pump to get her to wash herself. Jessica learns from Prerna that Prerna's community uses a different water station as they belong to lower caste. Observing the children playing with makeshift toys, she posts a video of the children playing, which inspires her friend, Erick, to travel to the village with his own, proper board. She orders a few skateboards and, with the help of Erick, teaches the kids how to skate. The children, including Prerna, are initially puzzled but soon become enthralled by the sport.

After helping a reluctant Prerna up on the board, Erick gifts her his own skateboard, which she accidentally destroys at the water dam. Scared of facing him, Prerna steals cash from her father and goes to Erick to compensate for his destroyed board. As Erick doesn't accept the money, Jessica applauds Prerna's honesty but asks her to return the money to her father. While keeping the cash back in the safe, she is caught by her father and gets beaten. She is later consoled by her mother, to whom she confesses that skateboarding makes her feel free, to which her mother cautiously warns her that women in the village aren't allowed to be free. As the children’s enthusiasm for skateboarding grows, it becomes a regular activity in the village. Prerna, in particular, shows a natural talent for the sport. The kids become infatuated with the sport, skating through the village, disrupting everything and everyone around them. Prerna’s father is particularly alarmed, believing that such activities are inappropriate for girls. He forbids Prerna from skating and insists that she focus on her domestic duties and studies.

The growing popularity of skateboarding, especially among the girls, sparks concern among the village elders and teachers. Kids carry out a protest in defense. They skip school to skateboard on the village streets, which prompts a teacher to file a police complaint. The police nab the kids and confiscate their boards. Jessica requests the police inspector to give the skateboards back and reassures him that she'll make sure that the kids do not create a ruckus in the village streets. She introduces the kids to NO school NO skateboarding rule. However, the village superiors are not convinced. Recognizing the children’s passion and the lack of a proper space to skate, Jessica and Erick propose building a skatepark in the village. They face significant challenges, including securing funding and overcoming the villagers’ resistance. Despite these obstacles, their determination and the children’s support push the project forward. They take the project to the Queen of Udaipur, who is inspired by her passion and secures funds to help Jessica.

As construction of the skatepark progresses, tensions rise within the village. Some villagers, including Prerna’s father, strongly oppose the project, fearing it will disrupt their traditional way of life. Despite the growing opposition, the skatepark begins to take shape. Erick brings in his skater friends from all over the world to assist in the build. Prerna’s love for skateboarding intensifies her conflict with her family, especially her father. He burns her skateboard and plans to marry her off. She is caught between her passion for skating and the societal expectations imposed upon her.

The skatepark is finally completed, becoming a vibrant center of activity for the village. Prerna’s father remains resolute in his opposition, forbidding her from visiting the park. This deepens Prerna’s sense of frustration and helplessness. Jessica organizes a National Skateboarding Competition at the newly built skatepark, attracting participants from surrounding areas. Despite being forbidden by her father, Prerna decides to secretly enter the competition, with the support of Ankush, Jessica, Erick and her friends, who understand the significance of this moment for her. On the day of the competition, Prerna sneaks out of her wedding to participate. The event is filled with excitement, drawing the entire village to watch. In a particularly tense moment, Prerna attempts a difficult trick, a drop-in from the highest point in the park, followed by a perfect landing. Witnessing her talent and determination, her father begins to soften his stance. Although Prerna doesn't win the competition, she is gifted an honorary prize.

== Cast ==
- Rachel Sanchita Gupta as Prerna
- Shraddha Gaikwad as Gunjan
- Amrit Maghera as Jessica
- Waheeda Rehman as Maharani
- Shafin Patel as Ankush
- Anurag Arora as Mahesh
- Jonathan Readwin as Erick
- Swati Das as Shanti
- Ankit Rao as Vikram
- Ambrish Saxena as Ramkesh
- Vivek Yadav as Tipu
- Sohan Suhalka as Vishwinath
- Sahidur Rahaman as Police Officer

== Production ==
The idea for "Skater Girl" was inspired by the real-life skateboarding movement in India, which has been growing rapidly in recent years, particularly in rural areas. Manjari Makijany, who co-wrote the script with her sister Vinati Makijany, sought to tell a story that not only highlights the sport but also addresses social issues such as gender inequality and the empowerment of young girls in conservative communities.

The filmmakers undertook intensive research to ensure an authentic portrayal of the cultural and social dynamics in rural India. This included spending time in villages, interacting with locals, and understanding the challenges faced by young girls in such environments.

The casting process was particularly challenging, with a focus on finding actors who could authentically represent the characters and the environment. Rachel Saanchita Gupta was cast as Prerna, the film’s protagonist, marking her debut in a leading role. The filmmakers brought in real skateboarders from India to add authenticity to the skateboarding scenes. Over three thousand children were auditioned, many of them skaters from skate communities across India. These skateboarders, many of whom had never acted before, were trained to perform in front of the camera, adding a layer of realism to the film. Kids from Khempur were trained by professional skateboarders and were cast as secondary characters.

The producers decided to film on real locations instead of recreating the skatepark on a set. As the central set of the film, the producers built Rajasthan's first and India's largest skatepark in Khempur. A significant part of the pre-production involved designing and constructing the skatepark, which plays a central role in the film. The skatepark was built in the village of Khempur which was also the location for the film The Best Exotic Marigold Hotel. It served as one of the primary shooting locations. The film brought together crew from the US, Canada and India.

Filming took place in Khempur and other locations in Rajasthan, capturing the vibrant yet harsh rural landscape that forms the backdrop of Prerna’s journey. The production team worked closely with local communities, often involving them in the filming process, which added authenticity to the scenes. The production employed approximately five hundred cast and crew including over three hundred and fifty village locals. The filmmakers spent over a year researching, writing and meeting with teenage girls and boys in Rajasthan to write Prerna and Ankush’s characters as authentically as possible. Fifty-five skaters from across India featured in the movie including thirty-four local skaters from Khempur.

Production on the film completed in early 2020. Post Production was completed in Los Angeles at Warner Bros. facilities.

== Release ==
The film was released on Netflix on 11 June 2021 in 191 countries and 31 languages across the globe.

== Reception & Legacy ==
=== Critical reception ===
On the review aggregator website Rotten Tomatoes, 88% of 17 critics' reviews are positive, with an average rating of 6.9/10.

Writing for RogerEbert.com, critic Sheila O’Malley said the film “captures the iconoclastic freedom and rebellion skateboarding has so often represented, and it joins a long line of rousing skate films.” O’Malley added,

Newcomer [Rachel Sanchita] Gupta is a revelation, as is [Shafin] Patel, who plays her mischievous and sweet younger brother. Both understand all of the complexities of this story and give beautiful and powerful performances. There may be one too many obstacles placed in Prerna's way…stacking the deck against her so there will be an even bigger payoff. But overall "Skater Girl" is so gratifying it doesn't matter.

Anupama Chopra from film companion in her review said, "Manjari captures this exhilaration effectively: this is what happens when stifled lives are allowed a moment of recklessness. In one scene, Jessica astutely observed that people don't hate skaters. They hate their spirit. There is a lovely sequence in which Prerna and Ankush sneak out of their home at night to practice – the flashlight on their skateboard create designs on the cement floor of the park. As simplistic as the storytelling is, by the end, the emotion kicks in. After all, no matter how impossible the scenario, it's always lovely to see a young girl take flight."

=== Legacy ===
Situated on a one acre campus, the 14,500 sq. ft. skatepark is one of India’s largest and Rajasthan’s first skatepark. The skatepark was built with the team from 100 Ramps with the help of Indian and International volunteers, and skateboarding and acting workshops began in October 2018. After filming completed in April 2019, the skatepark remains a free public use skatepark, with the aim of continuing the social impact such skateparks have on rural Indian villages. Hundreds children in and around Khempur village, Rajasthan have been positively impacted by the introduction of skateboarding. Many children from surrounding villages and schools attend free training workshops at the park. Four kids represented Rajasthan state at the RSFI national championship.

=== Source of inspiration ===
Following the release of the film's trailer, Ulrike Reinhard's and Asha Gond accused the filmmakers of stealing Gond's story of her rise as one of India's top skateboarders. According to the Director, Manjari Makijany, while Gond along with hundreds of female skaters across India were interviewed for the film, she denied that the movie was about Gond stating, "the film is not a biopic based on anyone's life story nor is it a documentary. It is not Gond or Reinhard's story."
