= Manjari Makijany =

Indian film director, writer and producer

- Born: 1986 or 1987 (age 38–39); Mumbai
- Occupations: Film director, producer, writer
- Years active: 2008–present
- Spouse: Emmanuel Pappas
- Children: 1
- Father: Mac Mohan
- Relatives: Raveena Tandon (cousin)

Manjari Makijany is an Emmy-nominated Indian-born filmmaker based between Los Angeles and Sydney who works on American and Hindi films. She is best known for directing the Netflix original feature film Skater Girl (2021) and the Disney Channel original movie Spin (2021). She directed several short films like her award-winning shorts, The Last Marble (2012), The Corner Table (2014) and I See You (2017) before venturing into feature filmmaking.

== Early life ==
Manjari Makijany is the daughter of Bollywood actor Mac Mohan, cousin of actress Raveena Tandon and aunt of Rasha Thadani. She did her schooling from Jamnabai Narsee School, Juhu, and graduation from Jai Hind College.

== Career ==
=== Early career ===
Manjari worked as an Assistant Director on Indian films Wake Up Sid (2009) and Saat Khoon Maaf (2011). She also worked on Disney's live action-animation Lilly the Witch: The Journey to Mandolan, Gandhi of the Month and the Indian schedules of Mission: Impossible – Ghost Protocol and The Dark Knight Rises.

Manjari completed UCLA's Professional Screenwriters Program, where she developed her feature screenplay, City of Gold. The script was nominated for the Nate Wilson's Joie De Vivre Award in 2015.

Manjari was one of eight women chosen to participate in the AFI Conservatory's Directing Workshop for Women in 2016. She is the second Indian to participate in the program since its inception in 1974. As part of the AFI DWW she directed, I See You (2017), a dramatic thriller about a suicide bomber who has a change of heart on the New York City Subway. She is also one of 25 Women selected to participant in the inaugural Fox Filmmakers Lab in 2017. Manjari was one of eight filmmakers selected to participate in the inaugural Universal Pictures Directors Intensive in 2017.

=== 2010s: Foray into directing ===
Manjari's foray into writing and directing began with a 7-minute silent film, The Last Marble (2012) that premiered at the Seattle International Film Festival and received much critical appreciation winning International awards for "Best Film" at Indian Film Festival of Melbourne. The film was included as the ‘Best of Fest’ at the Clermont-Ferrand International Short Film Festival and screened in over 30 International festivals.

The Corner Table (2014) was her second film and featured Tom Alter. The 24-minute short film was nominated for "Best Film" at the New York Indian Film Festival (2014). The film was a part of the Cannes Short Film Corner and an "Official Selection" of the Emerging Filmmakers Showcase at the American Pavilion - Cannes Film Festival. Manjari was the only Indian woman filmmaker chosen as part of this showcase.

At the AFI's DWW she directed, I See You (2017), a dramatic thriller about a suicide bomber who has a change of heart on the New York City Subway. The film was showcased to the industry at the Directors Guild of America where she was awarded the Will & Jada Smith Family Foundation Award and the Adrienne Shelly Foundation Award.

Prior to directing her feature Skater Girl, Manjari was shadow director on an episode of the hit series You (TV series) and on an episode in the 5th season of The Flash (2014 TV series). She also assisted on Dunkirk (2017 film) and Wonder Woman (2017 film).

=== 2020s: SkaterGirl - present ===
In 2019, Makijany began filming the Netflix Original Film Skater Girl (2021), a narrative feature film written by Vinati Makijany and Manjari Makijany which follows the story of a teenage tribal girl in Rajasthan, India who discovers skateboarding after a thirty-something British-Indian woman introduces skateboarding to a village. The film released on Netflix in 191 countries and 31 languages. Skater Girl is Makijany's directorial debut feature and was filmed on location in Khempur, Udaipur, Rajasthan in 2019. The film introduces newcomer Rachel Sanchita Gupta, and stars Amrit Maghera, Jonathan Readwin, Swati Das, Ankit Rao, and Waheeda Rehman. As part of the film, the producers built Rajasthan's first and, at the time India's largest, skatepark Desert Dolphin Skatepark. Spanning over 15,000 sq ft, it remains a public skatepark facility for children and visiting skaters.

Her next release in 2021 was Disney Channel original film Spin, a film about an Indian American teen who learns she has a passion for creating DJ mixes. For the film, Manjari was nominated for two Children's and Family Emmy Awards—Outstanding Special Fiction & Outstanding Directing for a Single Camera Program.

=== Philanthropy ===
Makijany is co-founder of the Skate Basti Foundation, a Los Angeles based 501c3 non-profit organization dedicated to building community skateparks anchored with art, play and education as the centerpiece to empower young people in underserved communities. She is also co-founder of the Desert Dolphin Skatepark, a community skatepark located in Khempur, Rajasthan, India.

== Filmography ==
=== Short films ===
Year	Title	Director	Writer	Notes
2012	The Last Marble	Yes	Yes	Also Producer
2014	The Corner Table	Yes	Yes	Also Producer
2016	I See You	Yes	Yes	Also Producer

=== Feature films ===
Year	Title	Director	Writer	Notes
2021	Skater Girl	Yes	Yes	Also Producer. Co-written with Vinati Makijany
2021	Spin	Yes	No	Also co-producer Nominated for two Children's and Family Emmy Awards Nominations - Outstanding Fiction Special and Outstanding Directing for a Single Camera Program.
