= Spin (2021 film) =

- Promotional poster
- Genre: Coming-of-age; Drama
- Written by: Carley Steiner; Josh A. Cagan
- Directed by: Manjari Makijany
- Starring: Avantika; Michael Bishop; Anna Cathcart; Jahbril Cook; Kerri Medders; Aryan Simhadri; Kyana Teresa; Meera Syal; Abhay Deol
- Music by: Marius de Vries
- Country of origin: United States
- Original language: English

Production
- Executive producer: Zanne Devine
- Producers: Manjari Makijany; Carley Steiner
- Cinematography: Jeremy Benning
- Editor: Franzis Muller
- Production companies: Princessa Productions, LTD; Reel One Entertainment; Bloor Street Productions; Disney Channel Original Productions

Original release
- Network: Disney Channel
- Release: August 13, 2021

Spin is a 2021 American comedy film released as a Disney Channel Original Movie (DCOM). It is directed by Manjari Makijany from a screenplay by Carley Steiner and Josh A. Cagan. The film stars Avantika, Aryan Simhadri, Michael Bishop, Jahbril Cook, Kerri Medders, and Anna Cathcart and premiered on August 13, 2021. The film received mostly positive reviews, especially for its performances and subversion of typical Disney Channel tropes.

== Plot ==
After the death of her mother, Indian-American teenager Rhea Kumar works at her family's restaurant Spirit of India with her brother Rohan, her dad Arvind and her maternal grandmother (nani in Hindi), Asha. During her Sunday dinner shift, she meets Max a DJ with whom she shares a class. At home, we see Arvind partly reeling from the emotional turmoil of losing his wife eight years ago.

Meanwhile, in a flashback, we are shown a younger Rhea (eight years old) in her room at night, having a meaningful interaction with her mother Meera about everything being music. She then humming the lullaby she would always hum to Rhea.

The next morning, she and her friends Watson, Molly, and Ginger discuss homecoming fundraiser "Festival of Colors", inspired by the Hindu festival of Holi.

The next day, while the rest of the gang have their lunch, Ginger runs to them in a panic after the DJ she had hired for the festival is unavailable, and Rhea, recommends Max to Ginger. The event is a success, and Max thanks Rhea for recommending him to Ginger, offering to repay her kindness. She asks him to teach her the art of the turntable, and Max agrees to take her to the vinyl store. The next day, at the vinyl store, he shows her what each of the parts of the turntable do, and they are at it on the turntable when their common favorite DJ Luka Cent walks in and impressed, gives them flyers for the contest "Battle of the Beatmasters". Max invites Rhea for practice at his house. Over the next few days, she learns more about the art of DJ.

Responsibility beckons as she ends up being late for her dinner shift, and she either turns up late at school or does not turn up at all. Finally on the day of the fundraiser, she is tasked with looking after the guests of a baby-shower, which she sneaks out of to attend the festival. When the track has been played, Max fails to acknowledge Rhea, leading to an argument between him and her after the show, while unbeknownst to Max, Rhea's gang has been watching them, and confronts him after she storms out.

Back home, Arvind grounds Rhea for two months. Discouraged by how everything's falling apart, and heartbroken that Max did not acknowledge her after she helped him create the track, she turns to Nani. Nani then takes out a box containing Meera's prized possessions, including her wedding gajra, her cassettes, and her cassette player. Rhea spends the night and the next morning listening to those cassettes and something sparks in her amid the calm.

Later one day, her gang turns up at her doorstep with DJ equipment, and with news that they entered her into the contest with an edit of her playlists. Although up to that point she was adamant that she won't compete, she finally decides to enter the contest after Ginger shows her Max has already entered, that too with the track she made for him.

Over the next few days, she starts working on her track. She also incorporates her mother's music in the track she has prepared for the final. Both Rhea and Max crush the semi-finals, reaching the finals. Meanwhile, at the restaurant, Arvind catches Rohan watching Ginger's Instagram Live feed with Rhea in it, and realizes he had been lied to about groceries. He takes Rohan along with him to the venue of the contest, to confront Rhea.

Back at the contest, Max has already played the track Rhea made for him, and has received a round of applause from everybody but the gang. As Rhea's turn approaches, she puts on her track, people start to sway, and everybody's initially intrigued, before finally getting into the groove. When Arvind arrives, he hears his late wife's voice on the speaker, realizing that this is where Rhea is happy. He discards the idea of confronting Rhea, and joins Nani, Miss Naomi and the gang in dancing to the music. After the track ends, Rhea and Max are called to the stage, and Rhea is declared the winner.

== Cast ==
- Avantika as Rhea Kumar, a young girl from a multigenerational family, who discovers her true talent upon falling in love with a DJ
- Michael Bishop as Max, the DJ Rhea falls in love with.
- Anna Cathcart as Molly
- Jahbril Cook as Watson
- Kerri Medders as Ginger
- Aryan Simhadri as Rohan Kumar, Rhea's younger brother
- Kyana Teresa as Naomi Eloi
- Meera Syal as Asha Kumar, Rhea's spirited grandmother
- Abhay Deol as Arvind Kumar, Rhea's father
- Tyler Kyte as DJ Luka Cent

== Production ==
On March 17, 2020, it was reported that Disney was developing a film titled Spin for its streaming service, Disney+. Manjari Makijany was set to direct the film, with Carley Steiner, Céline Geiger, and Josh A. Cagan set to write the screenplay. Zanne Devine was to serve as an executive producer on the film.

On August 20, 2020, it was reported that the film was being re-developed as a Disney Channel Original Movie, with most of the production crew remaining attached to the film, except for Geiger.

In August 2020, Avantika Vandanapu was cast in the lead role. On September 29, 2020, Meera Syal, Abhay Deol, Aryan Simhadri, Michael Bishop, Jahbril Cook, Kerri Medders, and Anna Cathcart joined the cast for the film.

Principal photography for Spin began on October 5, 2020, in Toronto, Ontario, Canada and wrapped on November 20, 2020. The film was also filmed in Brampton, creating an on-street set for the parents' restaurant, called the Spirit of India.

== Release ==
Spin premiered on August 13, 2021, on Disney Channel. However, the film was originally set to be released on Disney's streaming service, Disney+. In India, the film premiered on Disney+ Hotstar and Disney International HD on August 15, 2021, coinciding Indian Independence Day. It premiered as part of the "Friday the 13th Just Got Fun-Lucky" marathon, following the network premiere of Toy Story 4 and preceded the premiere of Descendants: The Royal Wedding. In Southeast Asia, it premiered on Disney Channel on September 19, 2021, marking the last DCOM to premiere on the said feed before it shut down on October 1, 2021.

== Reception ==
=== Critical reception ===
Amy Amatangelo of Paste praised the performances and limited focus on romance, stating, "While the movie touches on all the sweet moments of first crushes—the thrill of holding someone’s hand for the first time!—writers Carley Steiner and Josh Cagan and director Manjari Makijany don’t make Spin about Max and Rhea’s burgeoning romance." Proma Khosla of Mashable gave a positive review of the movie, saying, "Spin is revolutionary because it doesn't feel that way at all; it joins the delightful DCOM movie library and feels completely at home."

Udita Jhunjhunwala of Firstpost rated the movie 3 out of 5, indicating, "Spin is a Disney Channel movie (aimed at children and teenagers) that’s colourful, clean and musical. What sets it apart are the Indian American teenager at the centre, her easy-going Indian family and their genuine assimilation into life in America, whims and culture intact." Renuka Vyavahare of The Times of India rated the movie 3 out of 5 stars, writing, "Spin is much more than your standard coming of age story, where Indian-American protagonists must hustle to find their place in American culture, while essentially being raised in an Indian household. Their emotional discord while fitting into two diverse cultures is interesting but what’s more fascinating is how specific and yet universal these new stories are." Ians of ABP Live gave the movie a 3 out of 5 stars rating, claiming, "Although the plot is not particularly novel, writers Josh A. Cagan and Carley Steiner's script, sans any fantasy elements, maintain the typical Disney tropes. Read on. [...] Overall, the film boasts of a decent production quality and appears to be Disney's first attempt at a crossover film."

=== Accolades ===
The film received the ReFrame Stamp for the years 2021 to 2022. The stamp is awarded by the gender equity coalition ReFrame and industry database IMDbPro for film and television projects that are proven to have gender-balanced hiring, with stamps being awarded to projects that hire women, especially women of color, in four out of eight key roles for their production.

Year	Award	Category	Recipient	Result	Ref.
2022	Children's and Family Emmy Awards	Outstanding Fiction Special	Spin	Nominated	
2022	Children's and Family Emmy Awards	Outstanding Directing for a Single Camera Program	Manjari Makijany	Nominated	
