= Disney International HD =

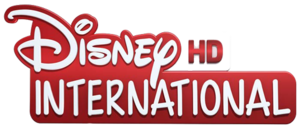
- Logo used since 2017
- Country: India
- Broadcast area: India; Bangladesh; Maldives; Nepal; Sri Lanka
- Headquarters: Mumbai, Maharashtra, India

Programming
- Language: English
- Picture format: 1080p HDTV

Ownership
- Owner: JioStar (branding licensed from Disney India)
- Sister channels: JioStar channels

History
- Launched: 29 October 2017; 9 years ago
- Replaced: Bindass Play

Availability

Streaming media
- JioHotstar: India

Disney International HD is an Indian pay television owned by JioStar, It is Disney India's first channel to be broadcast in high-definition and broadcast in a 16:9 aspect ratio. The channel primary airs Disney American originals.

The channel is primarily funded by subscriptions with secondary revenue from advertising and is targeted to the 14-25 years age group while the other Disney networks broadcast in the area are aimed towards a 2-14 age group audience.

== History ==
In April 2016, Disney Channel India dropped live-action programming to focus more on local animation, as those shows drove better ratings.

Disney Broadcasting India had made a license application for Disney International HD on 17 March 2017 with the Ministry of Information & Broadcasting (MIB). MIB approved the license on September 1, 2017, to take over from Bindass Play with Bindass Play programming shifting over to Bindass. The channel was launched on 29 October 2017. 10 of the 30 available TV series were on the channel at launch.

During the channel's first few weeks of broadcast, it didn't show any commercials.

Disney International HD shows an exclusive (as it has not been syndicated elsewhere) library of over 1500 or more episodes coming from 30 live action series. The channel also airs 100+ Disney movies selected for the targeted ages of 14 to 25 years old.

On 15 August 2021, coinciding the Indian Independence Day, Disney Channel's original movie Spin premiered on Disney International HD, two days after its release.

== Programming ==
- Austin & Ally
- Dog with a Blog
- Girl Meets World
- Liv and Maddie
- Hannah Montana
- K.C. Undercover
- Kickin' It
- Kirby Buckets
- Lab Rats
- Wizards of Waverly Place
