= Ravla Khempur =

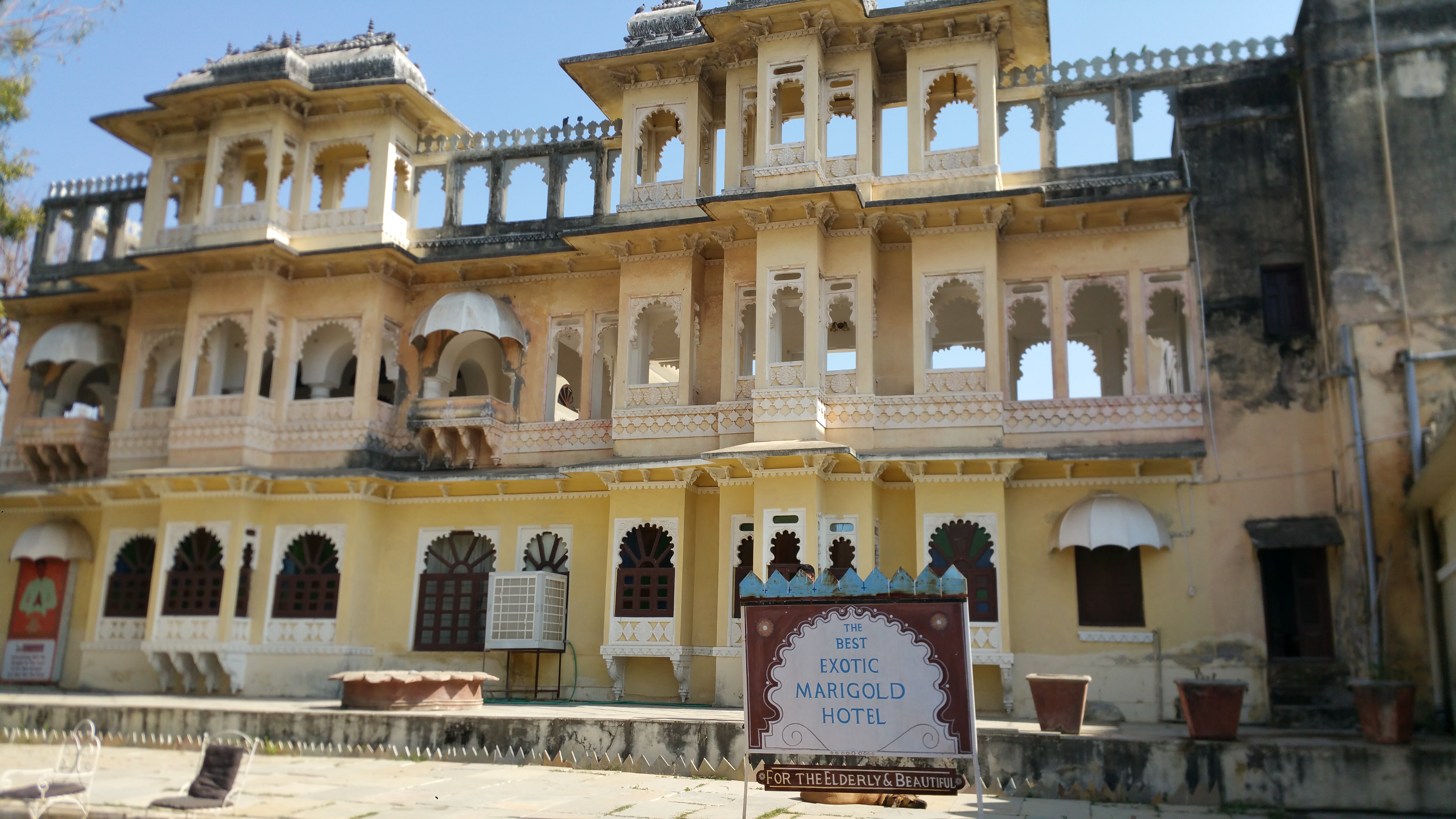
- December, 2018.

General information
- Type: Hotel
- Location: Khempur, Mavli, Rajasthan, 313203, Khempur, India

Other information
- Number of rooms: 12

Ravla Khempur is a haveli and heritage hotel in Khempur in the Indian state of Rajasthan. It was built in the 1620s and became known as The Best Exotic Marigold Hotel after being used as the filming location for the 2011 film's hotel and its 2015 sequel, The Second Best Exotic Marigold Hotel. The hotel is surrounded by a Marwari horse breeding stable and paddocks and caters to horse lovers.

== History ==
The 17th century rural hotel is located in the village of Khempur, in the Mewar region of Rajasthan, about 50 kilometers from Udaipur, and 9 kilometers south of the village's township, Mavli. In Rajasthan, the term 'Ravla' refers to the home of a village chieftain, historically the social, political and religious focal point. The hotel was the original haveli of a chieftain, Khemraj Dadhivadia, before being converted into a hotel, and is entrenched in Mewari history. The chieftain received the jagir or land grant after killing two assassins and saving the life of Jagat Singh II, who became the Rana of Udaipur and built the Taj Lake Palace. In the same century, the palace and village were plundered by neighboring raiders.

Around 1997, local villagers encouraged the hotel's owner and descendant of the chieftain's noble family, Hemant Singh Deval, who was residing in Udaipur, to return as head of the original jagir of Ravla Khempur, as sarpanch for Khempur. The hotel has a great influence on the villagers and they are friendly with hotel guests who visit the village, and offer tea and hospitality.

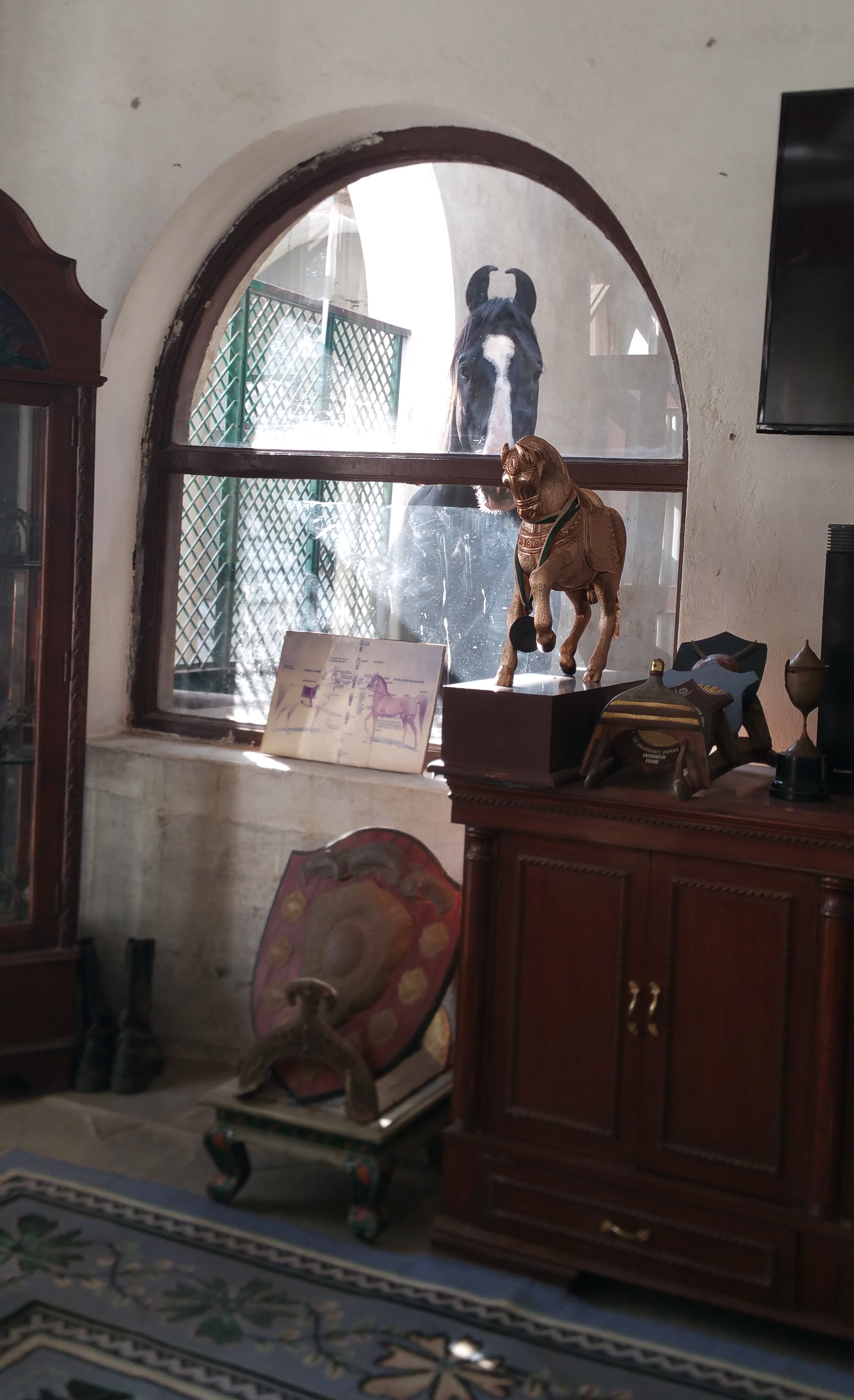
Stallion "Great Gambler" in dining room window. 2018

=== Equestrian hotel ===
On his return as a country gentleman, Deval spent his time as the hotel's host and becoming a noted equestrian. The hotel is surrounded by idyllic farmland of sarson and jowari fields, with a climate not as dry as the Thar Desert, to the north of it. The horse stables, with arched openings, distinguish it from other havelis, with stalls that once housed the horses of travellers to the hotel, but now house the Marwari mares and stallions owned by Deval. He became a horse breeder after returning to Khempur, involved with rebuilding the Marwari dwindling population. The Marwari, named after their original breeding place in Marwar, are most notable for their distinctive curved ear tips that point towards, and nearly touch each other, as well as a high-set neck that gives them an alert look, and a four-beat gait.

Deval also honored the horse by adding many horse paintings, photographs, and furnishings, such as a glass-topped table with wooden horse supports, and coat hooks in the shape of horses heads. He said he bought his first Marwari in 1990 for 8000 rupees and proceeded to educate himself as he bred, sold and exchanged horses over the years. In 2012, he performed on one of the Marwari horses, that were sent from outside India, in the Diamond Jubilee Pageant, and is currently the Joint Secretary of the Indigenous Horse Society of India. His two sons, Shantanu Singh Khempur and Rohitashva Singh Khempur, are also equestrians.

The farm's main stud, Great Gambler, is a prize winning stallion whose stall adjoins the hotel's restaurant, where he can observe, and be observed by, guests as they dine.

=== Guest facilities ===
The twelve bedroom guesthouse is a grandiose two-storey building with "huge archways", "ornate carvings", "frilly balconies", and "sweeping courtyards", with a deliberate aging of the exterior "monsoon-blackened" walls that show the centuries. The second floor "roof" bedrooms have a courtyard in the center.

In 2016, hotel renovations were completed and included a swimming pool and an equestrian-themed restaurant that serves Mewari cuisine.

== Filming location ==
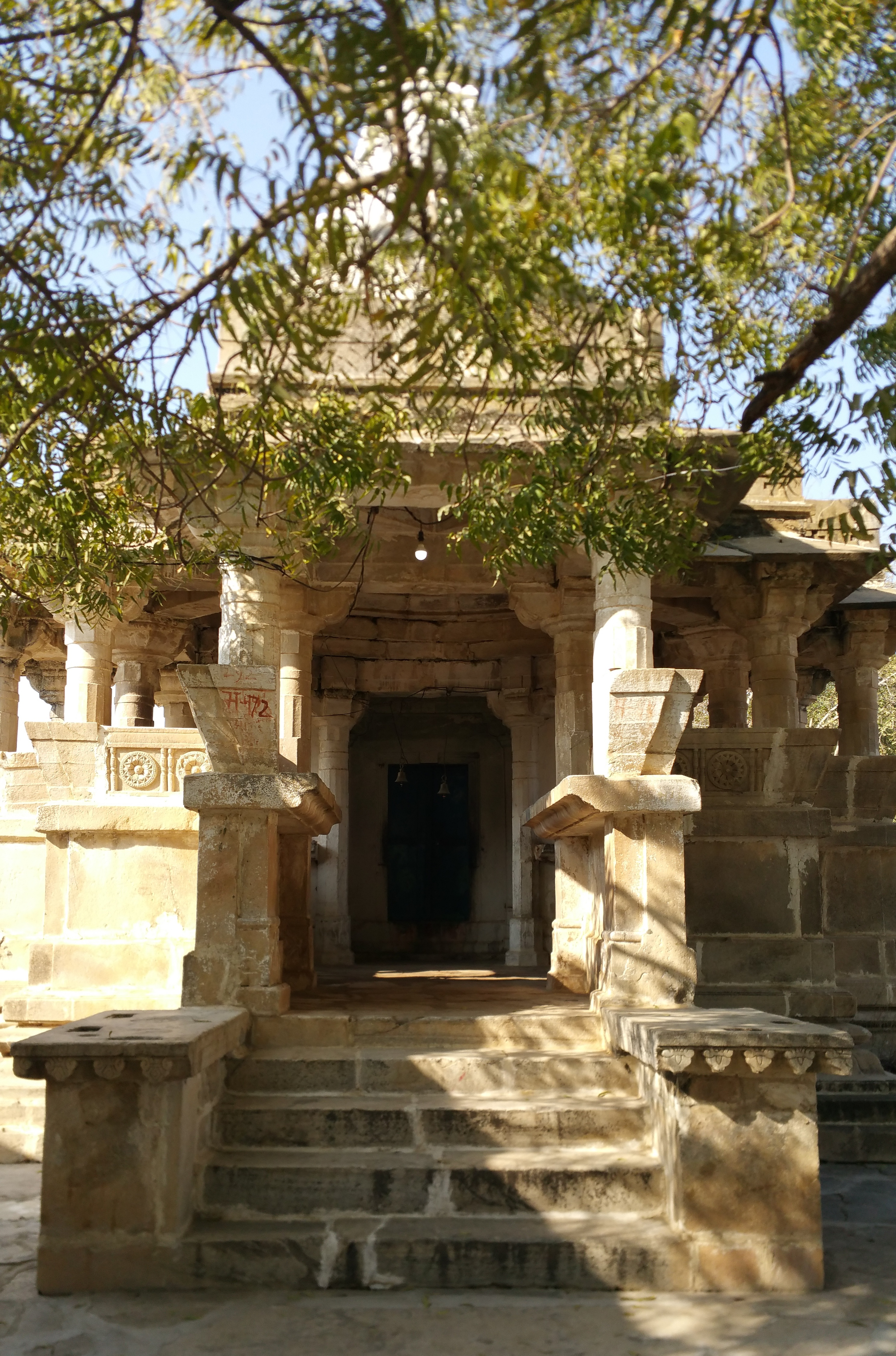
Krishna temple, front of hotel, used for Sonny and Sunaina's wedding. 2018

In 2010, filming took place for the first "Marigold" film with actors Judi Dench, Maggie Smith, Bill Nighy, Tom Wilkinson, Penelope Wilton, Celia Imrie and Ronald Pickup, along with Dev Patel. In 2014, they returned for the sequel with Richard Gere. Set designers transformed the hotel to fit the film, and included an adjacent Hindu Krishna temple for characters "Sonny" and "Sunaina's" Bollywood-style wedding in the second film.

One set piece that remained is the marigold carving which hangs over the main entrance courtyard, where Maggie Smith "held court" in the films.

Director John Madden said "the character of that hotel needed to have gone downhill, but nevertheless be aspiring to a former glory, and that’s a fairly good description of the way the place is now. It needed to have a magic about it, some sense of it being a refuge or a place where the seven characters wouldn’t immediately leave and try to seek alternative accommodation. It’s a very cinematic space because it has multiple levels and rooms that defy any kind of modern western concept of what a room would be."

Claire MacDonald, writing for The Australian in 2016, conjectured that the hotel's staff, Mohan, who had worked there seventeen years and wore stylish clothing gifted by the production company's wardrobe department, might have been an inspiration for "Sonny's" character.

== Reviews ==
Deborah Moggach, author of The Best Exotic Marigold Hotel said, "If you want a wonderfully atmospheric, slightly dusty, idiosyncratic, blissfully romantic hideaway, then the Ravla Khempur is the place for you". By 2015, the hotel had favorable reviews on TripAdvisor, and was featured in the Taj Lake Palace package tour, "Best Exotic Marigold Hotel tour". The Times Matt Hampton said of his tour of India, "But it might just be a stay at the Ravla Khempur hotel that steals your heart....the charming guesthouse offers Indian hospitality in a truly atmospheric setting."
