= Ulrike Reinhard =

German writer (born 1960)

- Born: 1960 (age 65–66); Heidelberg
- Education: University of Mannheim
- Occupations: social entrepreneur, speaker, and author
- Notable work: Janwaar Castle, 2014-2022 Skater Girl Asha, 2023
- Website: www.ulrikereinhard.com

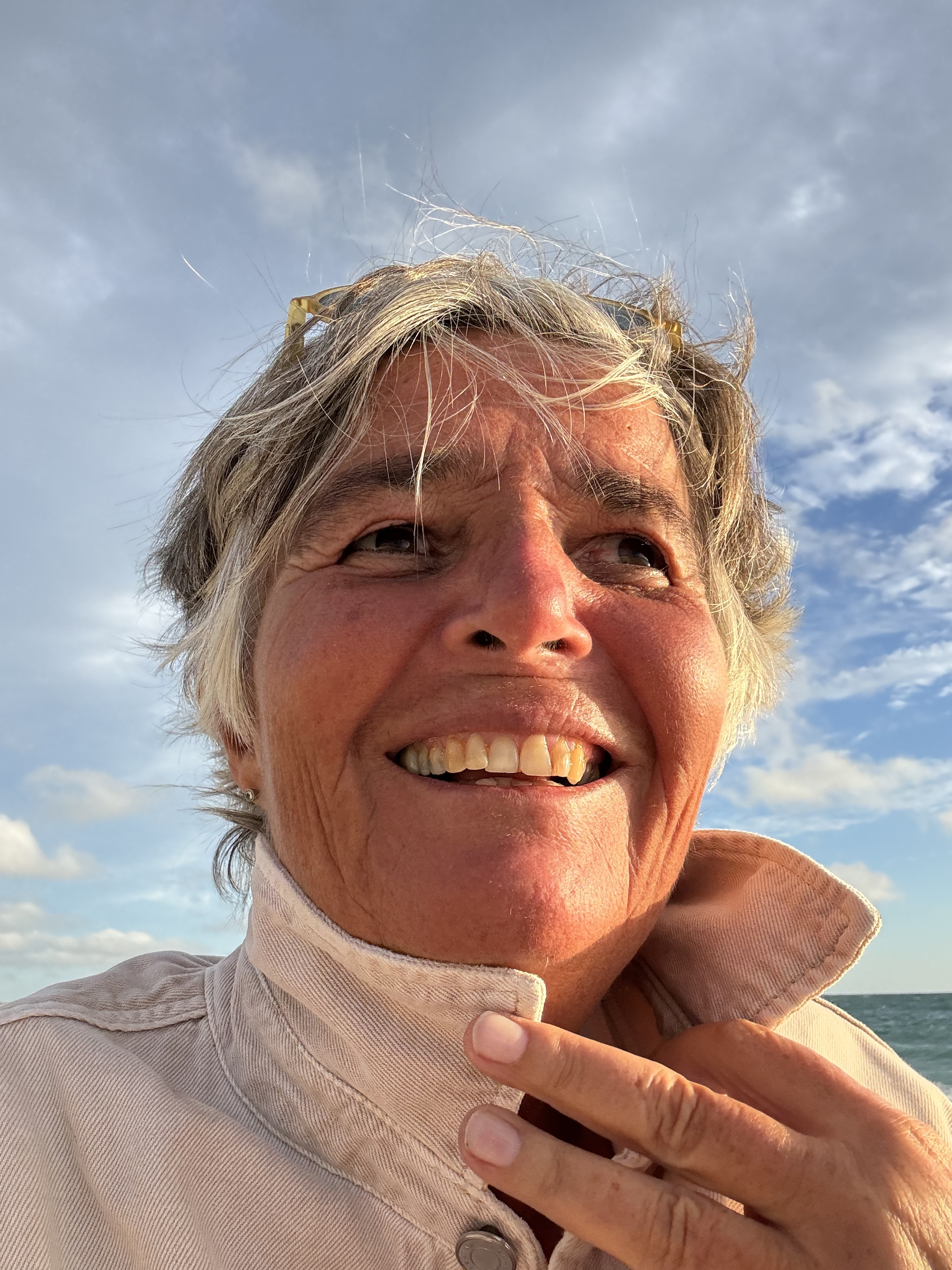
Ulrike Reinhard

Ulrike Reinhard (born 1960) is a German social entrepreneur, speaker, author, and futurist. She is best known for her skatepark in Madhya Pradesh, Janwaar Castle. Reinhard has also been editor of WE Magazine and has written for Think Quarterly. Most of her work is related to network theory with the Internet at its core, focusing on interactions and the co-creation processes within a network.

== Biography ==
Born in Heidelberg in 1960, Reinhard played competitive basketball for KuSG Leimen, one of the leading clubs in the area. As a late teenager, she competed at Bundesliga level — an exceptional achievement for such a young player. In 1976 she was selected for the German national team, participating in the European Championship qualification campaign in Paris. In 1979 she was part of the KuSG Leimen A-Youth team that won the German National Championship, and was awarded Most Valuable Player of the tournament.

Reinhard studied business administration at the University of Mannheim. In the final phase of her studies in Mannheim, she held a part-time freelance position at Zweites Deutsches Fernsehen, where she assisted the head of the Fees & Licenses Department in revising the national program’s licensing and fee frameworks for distribution in international cable networks.

From the mid-1980s to the mid-1990s, she lived in Sausalito, California, directly above The Well, where she received her first email account in 1987 and was introduced to the largely left-leaning intellectual circles that would soon become influential in the early online community. After her husband passed away in 1994, she returned with her young son to Heidelberg, Germany.

== Work & Projects ==
Back in Germany, in 1994 Reinhard organized a conference on interactive television, accompanied by her publication Interaktives Fernsehen. In the late 1990s she founded the whois publishing house in Heidelberg / Berlin, Germany, and she owned the domaines whois.de and whoiswho.de. whois was far more than a publishing house; it was a network and an online platform. It functioned as a specialized search engine built around a comprehensive database of approximately 20,000 companies in the new media and ICT sector across German-speaking countries – most of them with a detailed profile. The database included traditional internet service providers, software and IT firms, consultancies, publishers, event organizers, and more than 1,000 educational institutions. The platform was publicly available for free.

This “master database” formed the foundation for the whois industry guides, book editions, and expert round tables. All publications and initiatives targeted a B2B audience: buyers connect with suppliers, learners with educators, and entrepreneurs with artists and creative professionals. True to its motto “Find instead of search”—whois enables efficient, meaningful connections throughout the digital and creative sectors. She sold the domaines and the publishing house in 2010.

In 2014 she founded a skatepark in Janwaar in Madhya Pradesh, called Janwaar Castle, where two rules reign: one rule encourages the kids to go to school: "no school, no skateboarding," and the other one is "Girls first" prioritizing girls to get a skateboard. The park has had a positive effect in helping to encourage girls to be involved in physical activities and has reduced violence between the Adivasi and Yadev castes in the area. Now children from both castes make friends. Young people in the village also learn English, how to paint, create 3D models, learn life skills, music and dance. The skatepark is 4,843 square feet (449.9 m^{2}) and was opened in April 2015.

In 2016, Asha Gond — one of the village’s young talents — was given the opportunity by Reinhard to spend time in the United Kingdom, where she enhanced her English, engaged in creative arts, and further developed her skateboarding abilities. Gond went to The Butler Centre for Education in Wantage, Oxfordshire, England, about 24 kilometres (15 mi) from Oxford. Gond had initially dropped out of school after Class XI, so her journey to the UK marked the start of her new learning journey which eventually ended in 2022 when Gond passed her 12th grade exams. She became the first child in her village to travel abroad. With Reinhard’s unwavering backing, Asha Gond emerged as the first Indian female skateboarder to represent India globally, competing at the World Championships in Nanjing, China, soon after the announcement that skateboarding would debut at the Tokyo 2020 Olympics. She became a symbol of the inclusive spirit embodied by the Olympic ideal.

Reinhard's Janwaar project has inspired many award-winning short films, beginning with the influential early piece The Barefoot Skateboarders. Danny Schmidt’s documentary "Janwar" premiered at the Mountainfilm Festival in Telluride, Colorado, and went on to receive recognition at numerous international film festivals. Following the release of the trailer of Skater Girl, netizens familiar with the story of Reinhard and Asha Gond found striking similarities between the movie, Reinhard's project and Gond's life. While Gond and Reinhard were interviewed as part of the production of the film, director Manjari Makijany denied that the movie was about them.

In September 2024 the Orca Book Publishers released the children book "The Barefoot Skateboarders" by the award-winning Canadian Children's Author and Spoken Word coach Rina Singh. On its final page, the book acknowledges that it is grounded in Reinhard’s project.

To ensure that the skatepark and various community initiatives were run by the village itself, Reinhard and the youth of Janwaar created a non-profit called "The Barefoot Skateboarders Organization" (BSO). Today BSO is run by Asha Gond and Anil Kumar, a skateboarder in Janwaar, currently studying in Delhi.

In March 2017, Reinhard and a group of colleagues in Germany established the association The Rural Changemakers. Although the association was closed in 2024 after her visa applications for India were repeatedly rejected, her commitment to Janwaar has remained unwavering. Even from abroad, she continues to visit the village regularly and actively supports its young people and community initiatives.

== Books, Magazines & Platforms ==
Running through all of Reinhard's work is a consistent editorial thread: creating spaces — whether in print, online, or in person — where ideas, people, and networks connect. Her whois publishing house (founded late 1990s) was as much a platform and database as a publisher.

In 2004 Reinhard co-edited Digitale Transformationen — Medienkunst als Schnittstelle von Kunst, Wissenschaft, Wirtschaft und Gesellschaft, published by her whois Verlag in collaboration with the Fraunhofer Institut für Medienkommunikation. Co-edited with Monika Fleischmann, head of the Media Arts Research Society at Fraunhofer, the volume was an oversized, high-quality production — distinctive in both its print and paper — bringing together leading authors from Germany, Austria, and Switzerland to examine the intersection of digital technology, art, science, business, and society. Partners included Ars Electronica, ZKM, SAP, Sony, and the VolkswagenStiftung. Notably ahead of its time, the publication was released as the first German-language audio non-fiction book, accompanied by an audio CD containing eleven hours of content in mp3 format.

In 2008 she co-founded we_magazine, which she run as the editor. It brought together her ideas of network theory and it provided trailblazers like joi Ito, Ethan Zuckerman, Sugata Mitra and many more a platform. They all explored how the digital technologies would reshape our understanding of WE. Her thinking on the WE extended even into security policy: together with Stephanie Babst, Reinhard brought the concept to NATO, initiating we_NATO in the run-up to the Chicago Summit in 2012.

During the same time she also co-founded DNAdigital, a 2008-2010 initiative in Germany that aimed to foster dialogue between the 'Internet Generation' and business leaders regarding the world of work.

In 2009 she published together with her co-founder of DNAdigital. Willms Buhse, the book DNA_digital – Wenn Anzugträger auf Kapuzenpullis treffen, with which she continues her exploration of digital transformation and networked thinking. It also served as a documentary ot the initiative. It gathers articles and interviews that examine how Generation Z is redefining work and workplace culture across Germany.

In the same year she published Reboot_D - Digital Democracy, which was following the format of her first book in that year: a compilation of articles and interviews about the way the internet is shaping and transforming society and politics in Germany.

All her books — ranging from the who is who multimedia industry guides to explorations of digital democracy and grassroots change in India — reflect her thinking how knowledge travels through networks. The same thread runs through her blog, where she writes across categories she calls Field Notes, Becoming, and Speaking — short, reflective dispatches from wherever she happens to be: a lecture hall at the University of Pavia, a ferry crossing in Portugal, a conversation about consciousness and power. The writing is personal and unhurried, more concerned with questions than answers, and consistently bridges the local and the global — a talk for first-year political science students one week, a reflection on the Epstein files and collective disgust the next. It is the work of someone who has never separated thinking from living.

Publications:

- Reboot D-digitale Demokratie: Alles Auf Anfang. Neckarhausen: Whois. 2009. ISBN 9783934013018.
- DNAdigital - Wenn Anzugträger auf Kapuzenpullis treffen: Die Kunst aufeinander zuzugehen. Neckarhausen: Whois. 2009. ISBN 978-3934013988.
- Who is Who in E-Learning 3.0. Heidelberg: Whois. 2009. ISBN 9783934013346.
- Who is Who in Internet & Music. Heidelberg: Who-Is-Verl.-und-Vertriebsges. 2001. ISBN 9783934013131.
- Who is Who in Multimedia in Deutschland: Österreich und der Schweiz. Heidelberg: Springer. 1995. ISBN 9783642794704.
- Reinhard, Ulrike (2004). Digitale Transformationen: Medienkunst als Schnittstelle von Kunst, Wissenschaft, Wirtschaft und Gesellschaft. Whois. ISBN 978-3-934013-38-4.
- Reinhard, Ulrike (2018). REMOTE: The Rural Changemakers Of Janwaar (e-book, English ed.). Munich: TUBUK.digital. ASIN B079Y67V7Y.
- Reinhard, Ulrike (2023). Skater Girl Asha: When YOU Dare to Dream. Berlin: Independently published. ASIN B0CPC3CCYB.
- Reinhard, Ulrike (2025). Skater Girl Asha: When YOU Dare to Dream (audio book). Berlin: Independently published. ASIN B0FPMTQ458.
