= The Best Exotic Marigold Hotel =

2011 British dramedy film directed by John Madden

- British theatrical release poster
- Directed by: John Madden
- Screenplay by: Ol Parker
- Based on: These Foolish Things by Deborah Moggach
- Produced by: Graham Broadbent; Peter Czernin
- Starring: Judi Dench; Bill Nighy; Penelope Wilton; Dev Patel; Celia Imrie; Ronald Pickup; Tom Wilkinson; Maggie Smith
- Cinematography: Ben Davis
- Edited by: Chris Gill
- Music by: Thomas Newman
- Production companies: Dune Entertainment; Ingenious; Participant Media; Imagenation Abu Dhabi FZ; Blueprint Pictures
- Distributed by: Fox Searchlight Pictures
- Release dates: 30 November 2011 (SIIdC); 24 February 2012 (United Kingdom)
- Running time: 124 minutes
- Countries: United Kingdom; United States; United Arab Emirates
- Language: English
- Budget: $10 million
- Box office: $136.8 million

The Best Exotic Marigold Hotel is a 2011 comedy drama film directed by John Madden and written by Ol Parker, based on the 2004 novel These Foolish Things by Deborah Moggach. With an ensemble cast of Dev Patel, Judi Dench, Celia Imrie, Bill Nighy, Ronald Pickup, Maggie Smith, Tom Wilkinson, and Penelope Wilton, it follows a group of British pensioners moving to a retirement hotel in India, run by the young and eager Sonny. The film was produced by Participant Media and Blueprint Pictures on a budget of $10 million.

Producers Graham Broadbent and Peter Czernin first saw the potential for a film in Deborah Moggach's novel with the idea of exploring the lives of the elderly beyond what one would expect of their age group. With the assistance of screenwriter Ol Parker, they came up with a script in which they take the older characters completely out of their element and involve them in a romantic comedy.

Principal photography began on 10 October 2010 in India, and most of the filming took place in the Indian state of Rajasthan, including the cities of Jaipur and Udaipur. Ravla Khempur, an equestrian hotel which was originally the palace of a tribal chieftain in the village of Khempur, was chosen as the site for the film hotel.

The film was released in the United Kingdom on 24 February 2012 and received positive reception from critics; The Best Exotic Marigold Hotel opened to strong box-office earnings in the United Kingdom, and topped the box office after its second weekend on release. It became a surprise box-office hit following its international release, eventually grossing nearly $137 million worldwide.

It was ranked among the highest-grossing 2012 releases in Australia, New Zealand and the United Kingdom, and as one of the highest-grossing speciality releases of the year. A sequel, The Second Best Exotic Marigold Hotel, began production in India in January 2014, and was released on 26 February 2015.

The film was adapted into a stage play in 2022.

== Plot ==
Several British retirees decide to move to Jaipur, India, to stay in the Best Exotic Marigold Hotel, advertised as an exotic retirement home. Evelyn Greenslade, a widowed housewife, must sell her house to pay off her husband's debts; Graham Dashwood, a High Court judge who lived in Jaipur as a child, abruptly retires to return there; Jean and Douglas Ainslie hope to have an affordable retirement, after investing in their daughter's internet business; Muriel Donnelly, a former housekeeper, decides to have a hip operation in India to avoid waiting times; Madge Hardcastle, after several unsuccessful marriages, searches for new romance overseas; and Norman Cousins, an aging lothario, attempts to relive his youth.

After an eventful journey to Jaipur, the retirees discover the hotel is a dilapidated site, run by the energetic but inept manager, Sonny Kapoor. Sonny's mother moves into the hotel in the hope of convincing her son to invest in a more secure job. Evelyn gets a job at a local call centre, where Sonny's girlfriend Sunaina and her older brother Jay work. Graham takes long walks in search of familiar ground. While Jean hides in the hotel, overwhelmed by the cultural changes, Douglas explores the city. Muriel, at first xenophobic to Indians, comes to appreciate her doctor and her maid Anokhi. Madge joins the Viceroy Club and, surprised to find Norman there, helps him get into a relationship with a woman named Carol.

Graham confides to Evelyn that he is gay, returning to Jaipur to find his long lost Indian lover Manoj, whom he had to leave due to a scandal involving the pair. He, Evelyn, and Douglas eventually find Manoj, who has been happily married for years, but is overjoyed to see Graham again. Some time later, Graham passes away peacefully from an existing heart condition. After Graham's funeral, Evelyn breaks down in Douglas' arms, over her husband's death. Jean, increasingly pessimistic and envious, accuses Douglas of having an affair, only for Douglas to denounce their marriage. Jean then reveals their daughter's business has paid off, and they can return home.

Sonny and Sunaina have a falling out over a misunderstanding when Madge sleeps in Sonny's bedroom, further worsened when Mrs. Kapoor rejects Sunaina. Sonny becomes disheartened and decides to close the hotel. Evelyn encourages Sonny to express his love to Sunaina. Together, they race to the hotel, announcing to Mrs. Kapoor their intention to marry, regardless of her approval. Young Wasim, a hotel employee, reminds Mrs. Kapoor she and her late husband were in a similar situation when they wished to marry against their families' wishes. Moved, Mrs. Kapoor blesses Sonny's marriage.

Muriel, investigating the hotel's accounts, convinces an investor to keep the hotel open and agrees to act as a deputy manager to help Sonny. The residents agree to remain in the hotel, Carol moving in with Norman. Jean, realising her marriage is dead, encourages Douglas to return to stay in the hotel, while she returns to England. After a night of wandering, Douglas returns to the hotel, much to Evelyn's joy. The hotel flourishes thanks to Sonny and Muriel's partnership, with the residents staying to enjoy their retirement, and Evelyn commenting with the moral, "We get up in the morning; we do our best."

== Cast ==
- Judi Dench as Evelyn Greenslade, a recently widowed housewife who moves to India after paying off her husband's debts.
- Bill Nighy as Douglas Ainslie, Jean's laidback husband.
- Penelope Wilton as Jean Ainslie, Douglas' pessimistic wife.
- Tom Wilkinson as Sir Graham Dashwood, a High Court judge.
- Maggie Smith as Muriel Donnelly, a former housekeeper who moves to India for a cheaper, quicker hip operation.
- Dev Patel as Sonny Kapoor, manager of the hotel.
- Celia Imrie as Madge Hardcastle, a woman looking for a rich husband to marry.
- Ronald Pickup as Norman Cousins, an aged lothario.
- Tina Desai as Sunaina, call centre worker, and Sonny's girlfriend.
- Lillete Dubey as Mrs. Kapoor, widowed mother of Sonny.
- Diana Hardcastle as Carol, an English-Indian woman and lifelong resident of Jaipur.
- Sid Makkar as Jay, Sunaina's brother, and manager of a call centre.
- Seema Azmi as Anokhi, a Dalit maid at the hotel who looks after Muriel.
- Paul Bhattacharjee as Dr. Ghujarapartidar, one of Muriel's doctors.
- Rajendra Gupta as Manoj, an old friend and lover of Graham.
- Neena Kulkarni as Gaurika, Manoj's wife.
- Liza Tarbuck as head nurse Karen.
- Denzil Smith as Mr Dhurana, the Viceroy Club Secretary
- Honey Chhaya as Young Wasim, a hotel employee.
- Bhuvnesh Shetty as Muriel's physiotherapist.

== Production ==
=== Background and script ===
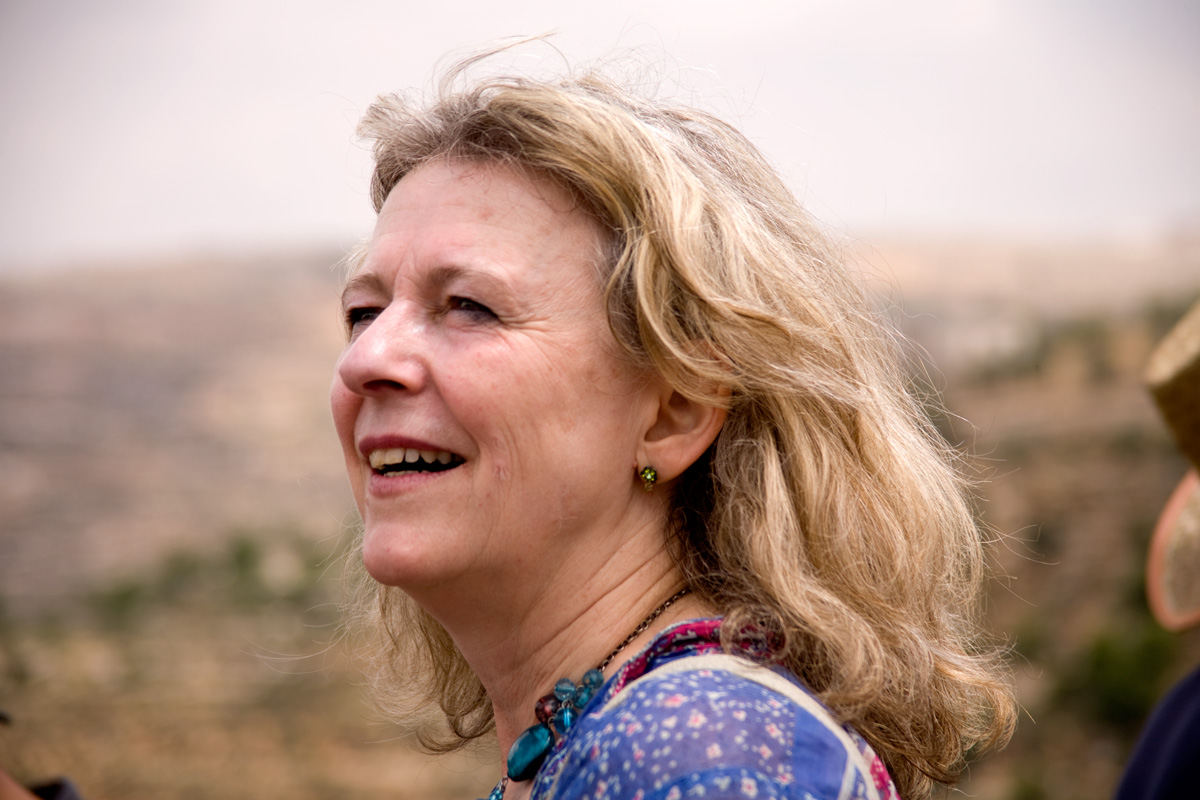
Producers saw potential in Deborah Moggach's novel.

Producers Graham Broadbent and Peter Czernin were the ones who first saw the potential for a film in Deborah Moggach's novel. The concept of outsourcing retirement, "taking our outsourcing of everyday tasks like banking and customer service one step further", appealed to them, and they commissioned screenwriter Ol Parker to formulate this concept into a screenplay.

Parker wanted to take the older characters completely out of their element and involve them in a romantic comedy. They initially encountered difficulties finding a studio; Working Title Films rejected their proposals, considering it unmarketable, but they eventually aligned with Participant Media, Imagenation Abu Dhabi FZ, and Blueprint Pictures.

=== Casting ===
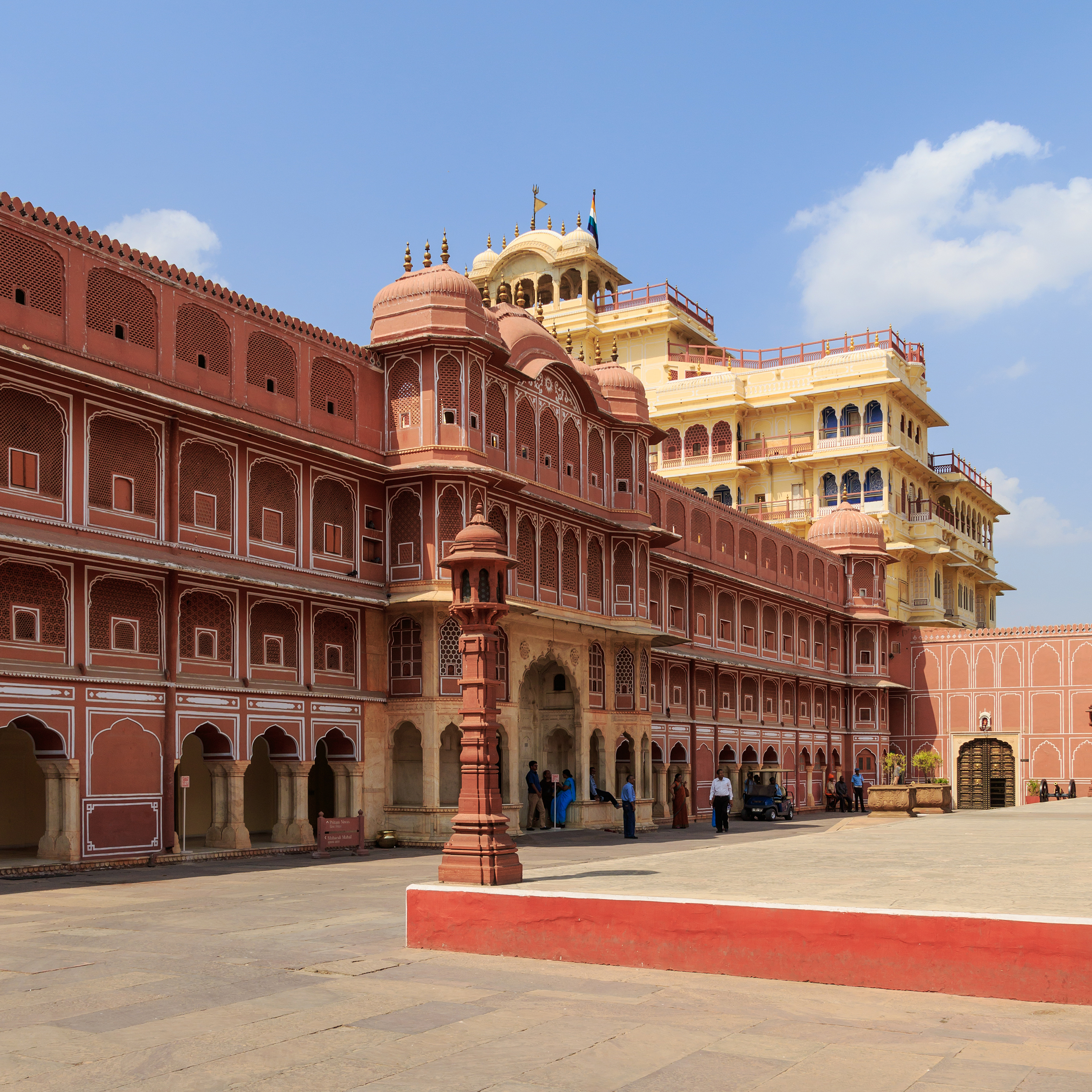
Some of the footage of the film was shot around the City Palace of Jaipur.

To lead the project, the producers Broadbent and Czernin approached John Madden, who was nominated for the Academy Award for Best Director for Shakespeare in Love in 1998. Madden considered the characters in The Best Exotic Marigold Hotel to be of "an analogous kind of geographical suspension", which have "entered a strange world removed from their former reality, cut off from their past, where they have to invent a new life for themselves". Dench and fellow cast members Maggie Smith, Penelope Wilton, Celia Imrie, Bill Nighy, Ronald Pickup, Tom Wilkinson, and director John Madden jumped at the opportunity to all work together for the first time in one film. Producer Broadbent considers Dench's character to be central to the story, and that Evelyn is much like Dench herself, being "the most wonderfully sympathetic person". John Madden considers Maggie Smith's character Muriel to be "instinctively xenophobic, never stepping out of her comfort zone in any way".

The filmmakers determined early on that the role of Sonny was crucial to the outcome of the picture, and they selected Dev Patel, who at the time was still revelling in the success of Slumdog Millionaire. Dench described Patel as a "born comedian", and Madden considered him to be a "comic natural—a sort of Jacques Tati figure, with amazing physical presence and fantastic instincts". Patel had personal experience of watching the elderly through his mother who had been a carer, and he was "enticed by how vivid these characters are, by their sarcasm and their wisdom", confessing that he "fell in love with the script because every character shines in his or her own different way and you believe in each of them." Lilette Dubey was cast as Sonny's mother, and English-language debutante Tina Desai portrayed Sunaina, Sonny's call-centre-operator girlfriend.

=== Filming ===
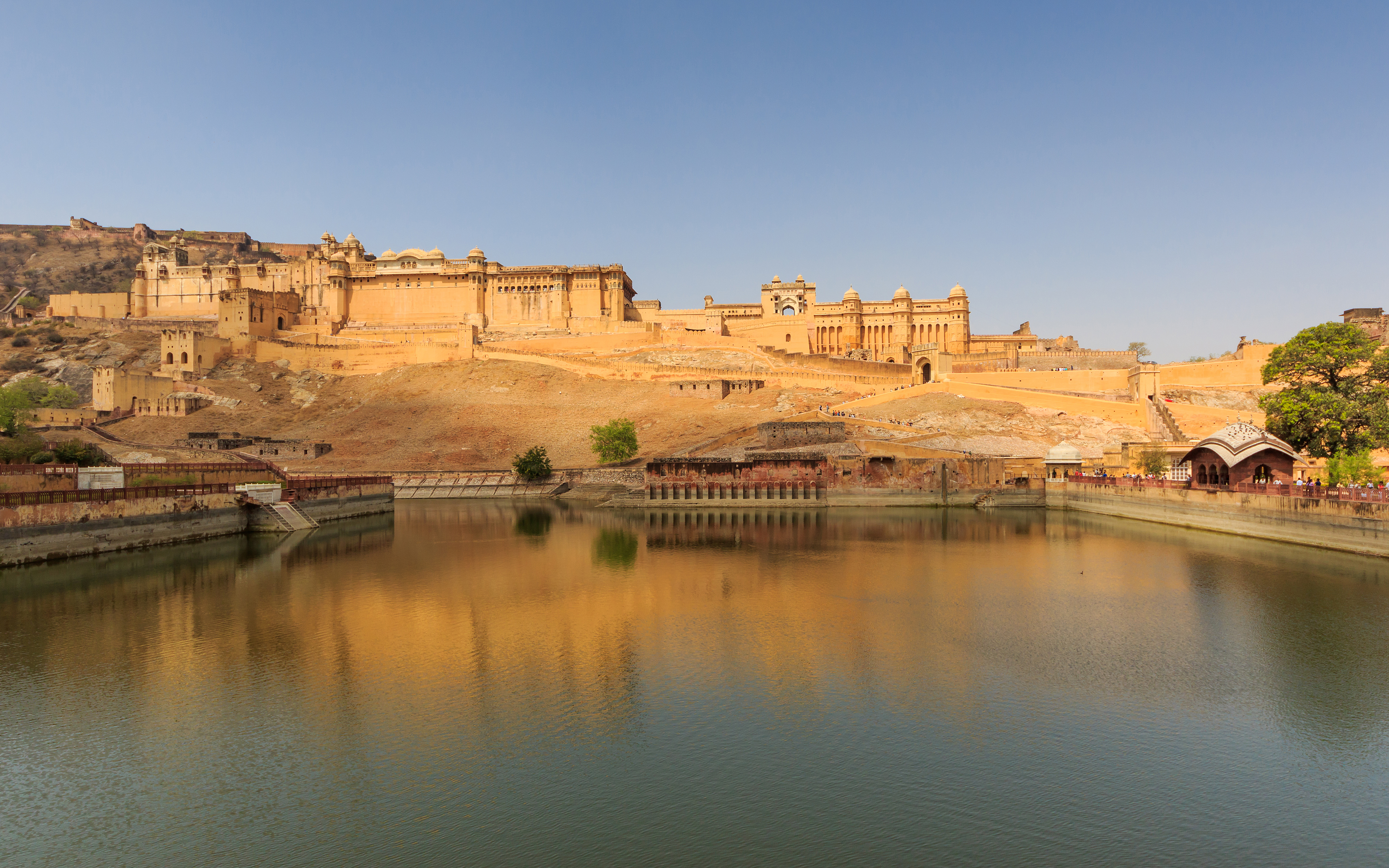
Footage was also shot in and around Amer Fort.

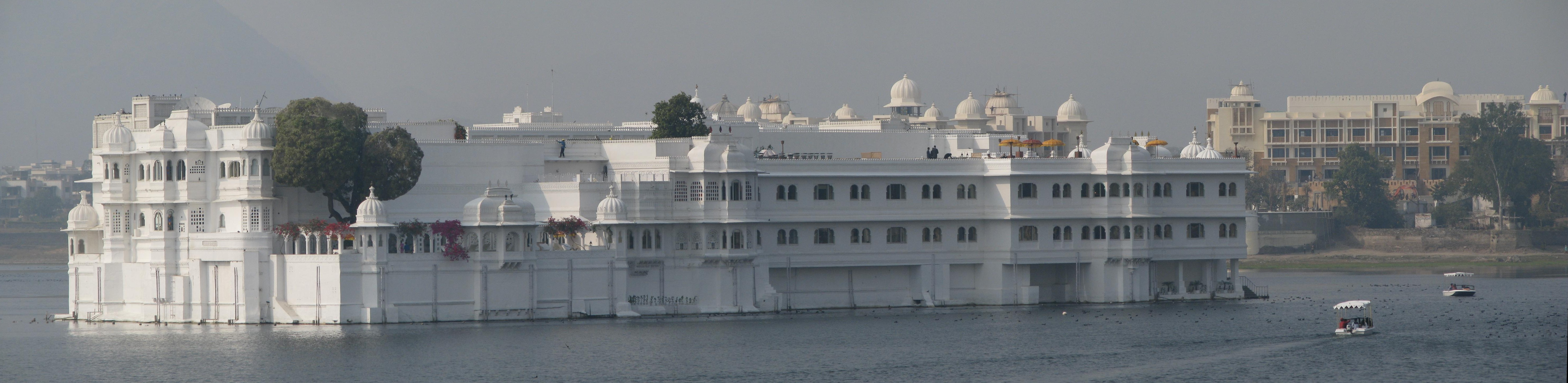
A culminating scene was shot at the insular Lake Palace Hotel on Lake Pichola.

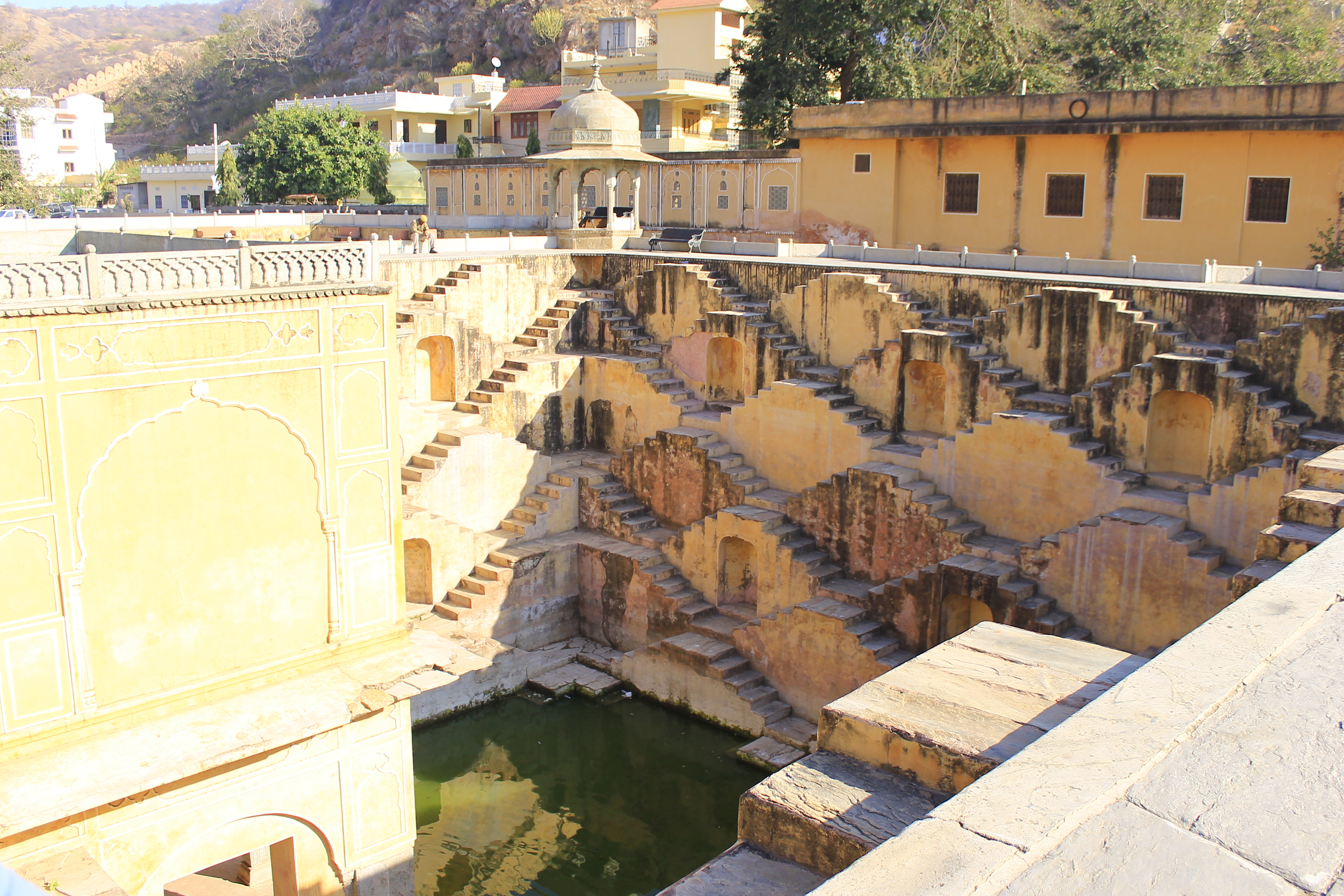
The Panna Meena ka Kund stepwell.

Principal photography began on 10 October 2010 in India. Most of the filming took place in the Indian state of Rajasthan, including the cities of Jaipur and Udaipur. In Jaipur, filming took place around the City Palace, the Marigold market, and on crowded buses. Other scenes were shot in Kishangarh, and on the outskirts of Jaipur, footage was shot at Kanota Fort, which stood in for the Viceroy Club. The place where Sonny and Sunaina meet in the film was shot nearby at the stepwell Panna Meena ka Kund near Amer Fort, a 10th-century establishment noted for its "ten stories of pale golden stone steps." Ravla Khempur was chosen as the site for the Best Exotic Marigold Hotel; it is an equestrian hotel that was originally the palace of a tribal chieftain, located about an hour and a half outside of Udaipur in the village of Khempur. Madden considered the building to have a magical quality and unmistakable charm, remarking that it had "something special that could ultimately draw the characters in. It had these wonderful cool dark interiors, with glimpses of saturated light and the teeming life outside its walls." Production designer Alan MacDonald, who won Best Art Direction in a Contemporary Film from the Art Directors Guild for his work, was brought in to embellish the interiors, intentionally making it clash with "interesting furniture inspired by colonial India, mismatched local textiles, all mixed together with modern plastic bits and pieces, with everything distressed and weather beaten." Footage was also shot at the Lake Palace Hotel at Lake Pichola.

Madden said that challenges of filming in India included the street noise, as well as the people's curiosity and hospitality when they saw him producing a camera. The cast and crew were well received by the locals, as was the director who, along with the cast, was invited by Arvind Singh Mewar, the Maharaja of Udaipur, to attend his lavish Diwali celebrations and firework display, as well as a royal wedding held at the Rambagh Palace Hotel in Jaipur. Chris Gill was the editor of the picture.

A sequel, The Second Best Exotic Marigold Hotel, began production in India in January 2014 and was released in February 2015. Most of the cast returned, with additions including American actor Richard Gere. The film received mixed reviews from critics.

=== Music ===
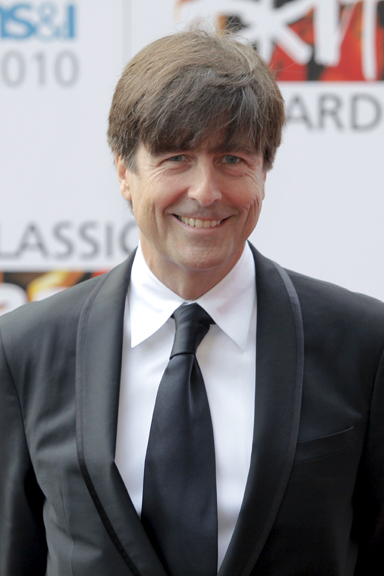
The soundtrack was composed by Thomas Newman.

The soundtrack, composed by Thomas Newman, was released in the CD format in 2012.

== Reception ==
=== Box office ===
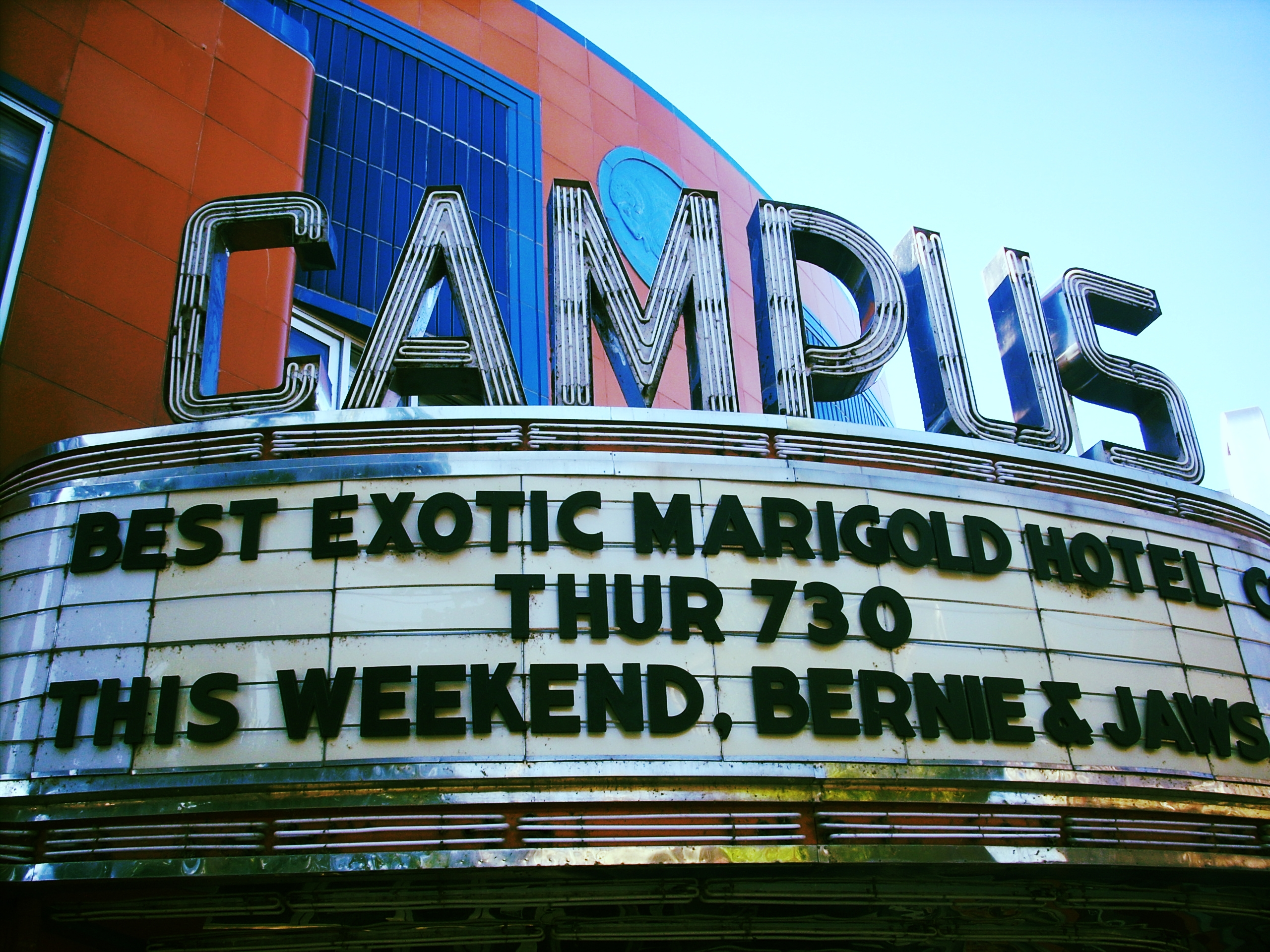
Marquee showing The Best Exotic Marigold Hotel at a cinema in Lewisburg, Pennsylvania.

The film was first shown at the Italian cinema trade show Le Giornate Professionali di Cinema ("The Professional Days of Cinema") in Sorrento on 30 November 2011 and at the Glasgow Film Festival on 17 February 2012, before being released widely in the United Kingdom and Ireland on 24 February 2012. This was followed by release in a further 26 countries in March and April. From May to August, more and more nations saw the release of the film, before Japan's February 2013 release capped off the film's theatrical debut calendar.

In the United Kingdom, The Best Exotic Marigold Hotel came in second to The Woman in Black at the box office during its first week, earning £2.2 million. It eventually topped the UK box office, with £2.3 million, in its second weekend on release. By the end of its UK run, the film had grossed over £20.3 million (approximately US$31 million at that exchange rate), and was the 16th highest grossing film in the UK that year. Prior to its United States debut, the comedy had already grossed US$69 million worldwide and passed both The Queen (2006) and Calendar Girls (2003) in total international grosses. After three months of release, it was ranked the third highest-grossing 2012 release in Australia and New Zealand, behind only The Avengers and The Hunger Games.

In the US and Canada, the film initially opened in 16 theatres in its first week. In its second week of release, it expanded from 16 to 178 screens in North America and grossed US$2.7 million for the weekend, ending eighth on the week's top hits. By the end of the month, Best Exotic Marigold Hotel had grossed US$100 million worldwide. The film had a worldwide gross of US$136,836,156. It ranks among the highest-grossing international films released by Fox Searchlight Pictures behind Black Swan (2010), The Full Monty (1997), and The Descendants (2011), and among the highest-grossing specialty releases of the year along with Moonrise Kingdom and To Rome with Love.

Elsewhere, The Best Exotic Marigold Hotel took in less than US$58 million. Nations contributing sizable box office returns aside from the UK and North America included Australia (US$21.2 million), Germany (US$6 million), New Zealand (US$4.4 million), Spain (US$4.3 million), France (US$1.9 million), Sweden (US$1.3 million), Italy (US$1.1 million), South Africa (US$1 million), and Norway (US$797 thousand).

=== Critical reception ===
The film received positive reviews from critics. The review aggregator website Rotten Tomatoes reported that 77% of critics gave the film a positive rating, based on 164 reviews, with an average score of 6.6/10. Its consensus states "The Best Exotic Marigold Hotel isn't groundbreaking storytelling, but it's a sweet story about the senior set featuring a top-notch cast of veteran actors." On Metacritic, which uses a normalized rating system, the film holds a 62/100 rating, based on 35 reviews, indicating "generally favourable reviews".

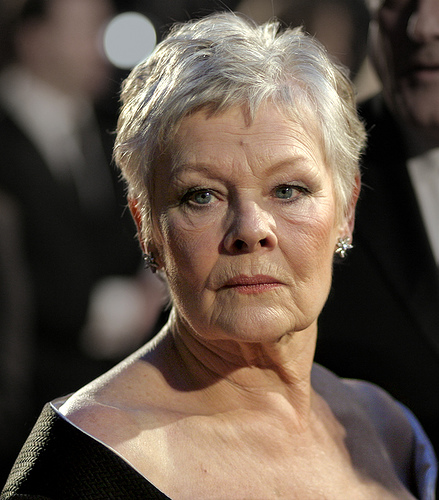
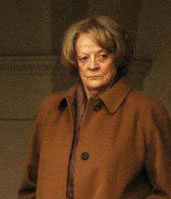
Judi Dench and Maggie Smith both received favourable reviews from critics

Mick LaSalle of the San Francisco Chronicle remarked that the film was "a rare reminder from films that the grand emotions are not only for the young and the middle-aged", citing it "too well made to be dismissed and contains too much truth to be scorned." Roger Ebert, writing for the Chicago Sun-Times, gave The Best Exotic Marigold Hotel three and a half out of four stars. He declared the film "a charming, funny and heartwarming movie [and] a smoothly crafted entertainment that makes good use of seven superb veterans." Claudia Puig from USA Today called it "a refreshing, mature fairy tale with a top-notch ensemble cast." While she felt the film was "about 15 minutes too long", she summarized it as "a delightful, droll and entertaining comedy of manners with an estimable cast" and an "ideal low-tech alternative to the special-effects laden" film projects of 2012.

Peter Travers from Rolling Stone rated the comedy three out of four stars. He found that "with a lesser cast, the movie would be a lineup of TV-movie clichés. But this is a cast that never makes a false move even when the script settles for formula." Chicago Tribune critic Michael Phillips wrote that "as two-hour tours go, The Best Exotic Marigold Hotel goes smoothly." While he felt that the film focused on "pleasantly predictable story", he noted that the project was one of those films which "are better off going easy on the surprises, and concentrating on a reassuring level of actorly craft."

Lisa Schwarzbaum of Entertainment Weekly graded the film with a 'B−' rating, summarizing it as a "lulling, happy-face story of retirement-age self-renewal, set in a shimmering, weltering, jewel-colored India", and that it succeeded in selling "something safe and sweet, in a vivid foreign setting, to an underserved share of the moviegoing market." Peter Bradshaw, writing for The Guardian, was more cutting in his 2/5 star review, saying that the film "needs a Stannah chairlift to get it up to any level of watchability, and it is not exactly concerned to do away with condescending stereotypes about old people, or Indian people of any age." Noting the luminous, prolific resumes of the cast he noted "nothing in this insipid story does anything like justice to the cast's combined potential." He went on to opine that the film appeared "oddly like an Agatha Christie thriller with all the pasteboard characters, 2D backstories and foreign locale, but no murder." The film received criticism for its depiction of India and its culture, which was described as relying on outdated orientalist tropes.

=== Accolades ===
At the Cinema Scapes Awards, organised on the sidelines of the 2012 Mumbai Film Festival, the film was honoured with the Best International Film accolade for showcasing Indian filming locations. The film and its cast earned five nominations from the British Independent Film Awards.

List of awards and nominations
Award	Category	Recipient(s)	Result
ADG Excellence in Production Design Awards	Contemporary Film	Alan MacDonald	Nominated
ALFS Awards	Actress of the Year	Judi Dench	Nominated
British Academy Film Awards	BAFTA Award for Outstanding British Film	John Madden	Nominated
British Independent Film Awards	Best British Independent Film	Graham Broadbent, Peter Czernin	Nominated
British Independent Film Awards	Best Director of a British Independent Film	John Madden	Nominated
British Independent Film Awards	Best Performance by an Actress in a British Independent Film	Judi Dench	Nominated
British Independent Film Awards	Best Supporting Actor	Tom Wilkinson	Nominated
British Independent Film Awards	Best Supporting Actress	Maggie Smith	Nominated
Critics' Choice Awards	Best Cast	Ensemble	Nominated
Costume Designers Guild Awards	Excellence in Contemporary Film	Louise Stjernsward	Nominated
European Film Awards	Audience Award	John Madden	Nominated
GLAAD Media Awards	Outstanding Film – Wide Release		Nominated
Golden Globe Awards	Best Motion Picture – Musical or Comedy	Film	Nominated
Golden Globe Awards	Best Actress – Motion Picture Musical or Comedy	Judi Dench	Nominated
Screen Actors Guild Awards	Outstanding Performance by a Cast in a Motion Picture	Cast	Nominated
Screen Actors Guild Awards	Outstanding Performance by a Female Actor in a Supporting Role	Maggie Smith	Nominated
Women Film Critics Circle Awards	Best Comedic Actress	Maggie Smith	Won
Women Film Critics Circle Awards	Women's Work: Best Ensemble	Maggie Smith, Judi Dench, Penelope Wilton and Celia Imrie	Won

== See also ==
- 2012 in film
- Cinema of the United Kingdom
- List of British films of 2012
