= Khempur =

Coordinates: 24°46′N 74°3′E

- Village
- Interactive map of Khempur
- Country: India
- State: Rajasthan
- District: Udaipur

Languages
  - Official: Hindi, Rajasthani
- Time zone: UTC+5:30 (IST)

Khempur is a village in Udaipur district, Rajasthan, India. It is noted for its Ravla Khempur, an equestrian hotel which was originally the palace of the Cāraṇa chieftain, Khemraj Dadhivadia, after whom the town is thus named. It featured as the hotel in the 2012 film The Best Exotic Marigold Hotel. The village also featured in the 2021 film Skater Girl.

== History ==
Originally known as Thikariya, it was granted to Khemraj Dadhivadia by Maharana Jagat Singh I in 1628 (VS 1685 Ashadha Vadi 3 Shukravar). It was renamed as Khempur after its chieftain Khemraj when the Maharana came to visit him in 1645.
