= Parignya Pandya Shah =

- Born: 9 November 1985 (age 40); India
- Other names: Parignya Pandya; Parigna Pandya Shah; Parigna Pandya
- Occupations: Actress, Voice actress, singer
- Years active: 1997–

Parignya Pandya Shah (Hindi: Prajñā Pāṇḍyā Śāha) (born 9 November 1985), also known as Parignya Pandya and Parigna Pandya, is an Indian actress, voice dubbing actress and trained classical singer. She speaks English, Hindi, Marathi and Gujarati.

As a film actress, she had a small role in the 2009 Hindi film, Kabira Calling, starring Salil Jamdar.

== Personal life ==
Shah was married to Ketul Shah on 7 December 2008.

== Career ==
Other than a small role in the 2009 Indian film, Kabira Calling, Shah's career has been as a voice-over artist, beginning when she was 12 years old. For the third Harry Potter film she took over from Rajshree Nath, as the voice for Emma Watson. Since then, she has been the official Hindi voice-over for Watson. Shah also voiced Watson's role as Pauline Fossil in the 2007 British TV film, Ballet Shoes.

When Shah did the Hindi voice-over for Hermione in (Harry Potter and the Prisoner of Azkaban), she knew virtually nothing about the series. However, she read the complete series in order to prepare for the role, after which she became a big fan. One thing she hadn't expected was for the characters of Ron and Hermione to end up together.

She continued to be the voice Hermione for the remainder of the series, along with her colleagues: Karan Trivedi (who dubbed Harry Potter in films 2–5), Rajesh Kava (Harry Potter in the last three films), Nachiket Dighe (Ron Weasley), Saumya Daan (both Fred and George Weasley), Rishabh Shukla (Voldemort), Dilip Sinha (Hagrid), Anil Datt (Dumbledore in the first two films and Arthur Weasley in all films from the second), Ali Khan (Severus Snape) and Vikrant Chaturvedi (Dumbledore in the later films). She has been the Hindi dubbing voice for Vanessa Hudgens's role as Gabriella Montez in the High School Musical film series and for Kristen Stewart as Bella Swan in The Twilight Saga. For foreign animation, she is very well known for voicing the character: Gwen Tennyson in Hindi for all the Ben 10 series, even dubbing over Haley Ramm's role in the Hindi dub of the Ben 10: Race Against Time film.

According to her Twitter, it's revealed that she is the Hindi singing voice for Minnie Mouse.

== Filmography ==
=== Live action films ===
Year	Film title	Role	Language	Notes
2009	Kabira Calling	Additional Role	Hindi	

=== Animated films ===
Year	Film title	Role	Language	Notes
2013	Chhota Bheem and the Throne of Bali	Chhota Bheem	Hindi	Passed from Vatsal Dubey who voiced this character in the Chhota Bheem animated series.

== Dubbing roles ==
=== Live action television series ===
Title	Actor/Actress	Role	Dub language	Original language	Episodes	Notes
Are You Afraid of the Dark?	Various actors	Various characters	Hindi	English	91	The show originally ran in North America from 1990 to 2000. It was later dubbed into Hindi on Hungama TV on 15 September 2008 and aired new episodes on the weeknights until 19 January 2009. In 2012, the Hindi dub moved to Sonic-Nickelodeon and aired re-runs until 2013.
Two of a Kind	Ashley Olsen	Ashley Burke	Hindi	English	22	
Mortified	Marny Kennedy	Taylor Fry	Hindi	English	26	Aired on Disney Channel India.
Mortified	Marny Kennedy	Taylor Fry	Hindi	English	26	Aired on Disney Channel India.
Genseishin Justirisers	Kanzaki Shiori	Yuka Sanada/Riser Kageri:	Hindi	Japanese	51	Aired on Cartoon Network India & Cartoon Network Pakistan.
Power Rangers RPM	Adelaide Kane	Tenaya 7	Hindi	English	26	Villain character. Based on Japanese Tokusatsu, Engine Sentai Go-onger.
Titans	Chelsea Zhang	Rose Wilson	Hindi	English		
Lucifer	Inbar Lavi	Eve	Hindi	English		

=== Animated series ===
Program title	Original voice	Character	Dub language	Original language	Number of episodes	Notes
The Adventures of Jimmy Neutron: Boy Genius	Crystal Scales	Libby Folfax	Hindi	English	119	
Ben 10	Meagan Smith	Gwen Tennyson	Hindi	English	52	
Ben 10: Alien Force	Ashley Johnson	Gwen Tennyson	Hindi	English	46	
Ben 10: Ultimate Alien	Ashley Johnson	Gwen Tennyson	Hindi	English	52	
Ben 10: Omniverse	Ashley Johnson	Gwen Tennyson	Hindi	English	80	
Phineas and Ferb	Alyson Stoner	Isabella Garcia-Shapiro	Hindi	English	222	
Slugterra	Shannon Chan-Kent	Beatrice "Trixie" Sting	Hindi	English	39	
Iron Man: Armored Adventures	Anna Cummer	Patricia "Pepper" Potts / Rescue	Hindi	English	52	
Kick Buttowski: Suburban Daredevil	Emily Osment	Kendall Wackerman	Hindi	English	20	
Pokémon	Various	Incidental characters (First Dub)	Hindi	Japanese	1000+	The First 8 seasons dubbed, were based on the 4Kids Entertainment English dub. The later seasons were also dubbed in Hindi and are also revised translations based on the English dub. A Second Hindi dub has been produced by UTV Software Communications featuring a new Hindi voice cast and translation and aired on Hungama TV on 19 May 2014. Parignya has voiced incidental characters throughout the first Hindi dub by Sound & Vision India.
Dragon Ball Z	Yūko Minaguchi (JP); Kara Edwards (EN)	Videl	Hindi	Japanese	291	The Hindi dub of the series was based on the edited Funimation Entertainment-Saban Entertainment-Ocean Productions English dub, being a revised translation.

=== Live action films ===
Film title	Actress	Character	Dub language	Original language	Original Year Release	Dub Year Release	Notes
Harry Potter and the Prisoner of Azkaban	Emma Watson	Hermione Granger	Hindi	English	2004	2004	First film in the series, where Parignya voiced Hermione, after it was passed from Rajshree Nath.
Harry Potter and the Goblet of Fire	Emma Watson	Hermione Granger	Hindi	English	2005	2005	
Harry Potter and the Order of the Phoenix	Emma Watson	Hermione Granger	Hindi	English	2007	2007	
Harry Potter and the Half-Blood Prince	Emma Watson	Hermione Granger	Hindi	English	2009	2009	
Harry Potter and the Deathly Hallows – Part 1	Emma Watson	Hermione Granger	Hindi	English	2010	2010	
Harry Potter and the Deathly Hallows – Part 2	Emma Watson	Hermione Granger	Hindi	English	2011	2011	
Ballet Shoes	Emma Watson	Pauline Fossil	Hindi	English	2007	2008	TV movie.
The Bling Ring	Emma Watson	Nicki Moore	Hindi	English	2014	2014	
Noah	Emma Watson	Ila	Hindi	English	2014	2014	
Ben 10: Race Against Time	Haley Ramm	Gwen Tennyson	Hindi	English	2007	2007	
High School Musical	Vanessa Hudgens	Gabriella Montez	Hindi	English	2006	2007	
High School Musical 2	Vanessa Hudgens	Gabriella Montez	Hindi	English	2007	2008	Both the second and third films premiered dubbed into Hindi in the same year of 2008.
High School Musical 3: Senior Year	Vanessa Hudgens	Gabriella Montez	Hindi	English	2008	2008	Both the second and third films premiered dubbed into Hindi in the same year of 2008.
Twilight	Kristen Stewart	Bella Swan	Hindi	English	2008	2008	Performed alongside Shanoor Mirza who voiced Robert Pattinson as Edward Cullen in Hindi.
The Twilight Saga: New Moon	Kristen Stewart	Bella Swan	Hindi	English	2009	2009	Performed alongside Chetanya Adib who voiced Robert Pattinson as Edward Cullen in Hindi.
The Twilight Saga: Eclipse	Kristen Stewart	Bella Swan	Hindi	English	2010	2010	
The Twilight Saga: Breaking Dawn – Part 1	Kristen Stewart	Bella Swan Cullen	Hindi	English	2011	2011	
The Twilight Saga: Breaking Dawn – Part 2	Kristen Stewart	Bella Cullen	Hindi	English	2012	2012	
Fast Five	Elsa Pataky	Elena Neves	Hindi	English	2011	2011	
Fast & Furious 6	Elsa Pataky	Elena Neves	Hindi	English	2013	2013	
Furious 7	Elsa Pataky	Elena Neves	Hindi	English	2015	2015	
The Fate of the Furious	Elsa Pataky	Elena Neves	Hindi	English	2017	2017	
Oblivion	Olga Kurylenko	Julia	Hindi	English	2013	2013	Performed alongside Mayur Vyas who voiced Morgan Freeman as Malcolm Beech, Shanoor Mirza who voiced Tom Cruise as Jack Harper in Hindi.
X-Men: Apocalypse	Alexandra Shipp	Ororo Munroe / Storm	Hindi	English	2016	2016	
Dark Phoenix	Alexandra Shipp	Ororo Munroe / Storm	Hindi	English	2019	2019	

=== Animated films ===
Film title	Original voice	Character	Dub language	Original language	Original Year Release	Dub Year Release	Notes
The Tale of Despereaux	Emma Watson	Princess Pea	Hindi	English	2008	2008	
Phineas and Ferb the Movie: Across the 2nd Dimension	Alyson Stoner	Isabella Garcia-Shapiro	Hindi	English	2011	2011	Aired on Disney Channel India on 20 September 2011 and Disney XD India on 2 October 2011.
Ice Age: Continental Drift	Keke Palmer	Peaches	Hindi	English	2012	2012	
Ice Age: Collision Course	Keke Palmer	Peaches	Hindi	English	2016	2016	

== See also ==
- List of Indian dubbing artists
