= List of Indian dubbing artists =

This is a list of Indian dubbing artists who have Wikipedia articles and are credited for providing voice-overs for roles in foreign media. It also includes those who have worked in Indian media, dubbing in different languages or providing voices for actors unable to perform in the original language. Indian dubbing artists contribute to a wide range of genres, including animation, live-action films, television series, and web content, often adapting performances to suit the cultural and linguistic nuances of different regions. Their work is essential in making international content accessible to diverse audiences, as well as in expanding the reach of Indian productions across language barriers within the country.

== A ==
| Name | Language(s) spoken | Known roles | Notes |
|---|---|---|---|
| Abhinav Shukla | Hindi | Provided the Hindi dubbing for Mahesh Babu in Sarileru Neekevvaru. | |
| Ashiesh Roy | English | Provided the Hindi dubbing for Heath Ledger as The Joker in The Dark Knight (2008). | Ashiesh is also a film and TV actor. |
| Ashiesh Roy | Hindi | Provided the Hindi dubbing for Heath Ledger as The Joker in The Dark Knight (2008). | Ashiesh is also a film and TV actor. |
| Ami Trivedi | Hindi | Provided the Hindi dubbing for Daniel Radcliffe as Harry Potter in the first Harry Potter film. | Sister of Karan Trivedi who's also a dubbing artist. |
| Ami Trivedi | Gujarati | Provided the Hindi dubbing for Daniel Radcliffe as Harry Potter in the first Harry Potter film. | Sister of Karan Trivedi who's also a dubbing artist. |
| Anandavally CR | Malayalam | Been voice of almost all leading South Indian heroines in Malayalam. Dubbed for more than 2000 Malayalam movies. Won Kerala State Award in 1993 for dubbing. | She was also a theatre and film actress. Won Kerala State Award for Drama in 1978. |
| Anandavally CR | Tamil | Been voice of almost all leading South Indian heroines in Malayalam. Dubbed for more than 2000 Malayalam movies. Won Kerala State Award in 1993 for dubbing. | She was also a theatre and film actress. Won Kerala State Award for Drama in 1978. |
| Angel Shijoy | Malayalam | She had won the Kerala State TV Award twice by dubbing for tele serials in 2013 and 2016 and Kerala State Film Award for Best Dubbing Artist in 2015 for Haram. | - |
| Anirban Bhattacharyya | Hindi | Official Hindi voice for the central villain Professor Zündapp in Cars 2 (2011), originally voiced by Thomas Kretschmann. He also has dubbed for multiple characters for the Hindi version of the film The Wild (2006) | |
| Anuj Gurwara | Hindi | He is known for dubbing for Anthony Mackie as Sam Wilson / Falcon in Marvel movies in Hindi. He also dubbed for Telugu actor Nani in Makkhi (dubbed version of Telugu movie Eega). | |
| Anuradha Sriram | Tamil | | |
| Armaan Malik | Hindi | Hindi dubbed for Aladdin as Aladdin | Indian Singer-Songwriter |
| Ashwin Mushran | Hindi | *Official Hindi dub-over artist for Adam Sandler and Takeshi Kaneshiro. | |
| Atul Kapoor | English | *Hindi dubbed for J.A.R.V.I.S.'s voice, replacing Paul Bettany's voice in Marvel movies. Also known as the voice of Bigg Boss | - |
| Atul Kapoor | Hindi | *Hindi dubbed for J.A.R.V.I.S.'s voice, replacing Paul Bettany's voice in Marvel movies. Also known as the voice of Bigg Boss | - |
| Avinash Sachdev | Hindi | Dubbed in Hindi for Dhanush in Vaathi and Sivakarthikeyan in Doctor. | |

== B ==
| Name | Language(s) spoken | Known roles | Notes |
|---|---|---|---|
| Bhagyalakshmi | Malayalam | She works primarily in Malayalam Film Industry, most notably for actresses Shobana & Urvashi. | |
| Bhanupriya | Tamil | Voice actor for Urmila Matondkar in Indian, Priya Raman in Suryavamsam | |
| Biswanath Basu | Bengali | Voice over for Mimoh in Rocky | |
| Brindha Sivakumar | Tamil | For Alia Bhatt, the Tamil dubbed version of Brahmastra | |

== C ==
| Name | Language(s) spoken | Known roles | Notes |
|---|---|---|---|
| Chetan Shashital | Hindi | Hindi dubbed for Fred Tatasciore as #8 in 9. | |
| Chetanya Adib | English | Hindi dubbed for Paul Walker as Brian O'Conner in Fast and the Furious film 4-7; Also dubbed for South Indian actors Karthi, Vijay, Prabhas and Venkatesh Daggubati in Hindi | - |
| Chetanya Adib | Hindi | Hindi dubbed for Paul Walker as Brian O'Conner in Fast and the Furious film 4-7; Also dubbed for South Indian actors Karthi, Vijay, Prabhas and Venkatesh Daggubati in Hindi | - |
| Chinmayi | Tamil | Known for dubbing Samantha's lines in her films. | - |
| Chinmayi | Hindi | Known for dubbing Samantha's lines in her films. | - |
| Chinmayi | Telugu | Known for dubbing Samantha's lines in her films. | - |
| Chinmayi | Kannada | Known for dubbing Samantha's lines in her films. | - |

== D ==
| Name | Language(s) spoken | Known roles | Notes |
|---|---|---|---|
| Dalip Tahil | English | *Hindi-Dubbed as Ego, in Guardians of the Galaxy Vol. 2 for Kurt Russell. | - |
| Dalip Tahil | Hindi | *Hindi-Dubbed as Ego, in Guardians of the Galaxy Vol. 2 for Kurt Russell. | - |
| Dalip Tahil | Punjabi | *Hindi-Dubbed as Ego, in Guardians of the Galaxy Vol. 2 for Kurt Russell. | - |
| Damandeep Singh Baggan | English | *Official Hindi dub-over artist for Jim Carrey. *Hindi-Dubbed for Marty the Zebra in the Madagascar films. *Dubbed in Hindi for Vijay Devarakonda in Dear Comrade. | - |
| Damandeep Singh Baggan | Hindi | *Official Hindi dub-over artist for Jim Carrey. *Hindi-Dubbed for Marty the Zebra in the Madagascar films. *Dubbed in Hindi for Vijay Devarakonda in Dear Comrade. | - |
| Damandeep Singh Baggan | Punjabi | *Official Hindi dub-over artist for Jim Carrey. *Hindi-Dubbed for Marty the Zebra in the Madagascar films. *Dubbed in Hindi for Vijay Devarakonda in Dear Comrade. | - |
| Deepa Venkat | Hindi | Known for dubbing Nayanthara's lines in most of her films from Raja Rani onwards | - |
| Deepa Venkat | Tamil | Known for dubbing Nayanthara's lines in most of her films from Raja Rani onwards | - |
| Deepa Venkat | Telugu | Known for dubbing Nayanthara's lines in most of her films from Raja Rani onwards | - |
| Deepika Joshi-Shah † | Hindi | - | - |
| Deepika Joshi-Shah † | Marathi | - | - |
| Deepika Joshi-Shah † | Kannada | - | - |
| Devi S. | Malayalam | - | - |
| Dheena Chandra Dhas | English | Dubbed the English voices of various British officers in the film 1921 directed by I. V. Sasi | - |

== E ==
| Name | Language(s) spoken | Known roles | Notes |
|---|---|---|---|
| Eijaz Khan | Hindi | Dubbed in Hindi for Ajith Kumar in Viswasam and Thunivu, R. Sarathkumar in Varisu, Nandamuri Balakrishna in Ruler and Arjun Sarja in Leo. | |

== G ==
| Name | Language(s) spoken | Known roles | Notes |
|---|---|---|---|
| Gaurav Chopra | Hindi | Official Hindi dubbed voice of Thor | - |
| Gireesh Sahedev | Hindi | Official Hindi dubbed voice of Professor Monster in the 1970 Japanese Spider-Man series | |

== J ==
| Name | Language(s) spoken | Known roles | Notes |
|---|---|---|---|
| Joy Sengupta | Hindi | He is known for dubbing for Chris Evans as Steve Rogers / Captain America in Marvel movies in Hindi. | |
| Javed Jaffrey | Hindi | *Official Hindi voice for Mickey Mouse. | - |

== K ==
| Name | Language(s) spoken | Known roles | Notes |
|---|---|---|---|
| Karan Trivedi | Hindi | *Hindi-Dubbed Daniel Radcliffe as Harry Potter for the Harry Potter films 2-5. *Hindi-Dubbed for Zac Efron as Troy Bolton in the High School Musical films. Hindi-Dubbed Tsubasa Otori in Beyblade: Metal Fusion, Tsubasa Otori, Zeo Abyss in Beyblade: Metal Masters. | *Brother of Ami Trivedi who's also a dubbing artist. |
| Karan Trivedi | Gujarati | *Hindi-Dubbed Daniel Radcliffe as Harry Potter for the Harry Potter films 2-5. *Hindi-Dubbed for Zac Efron as Troy Bolton in the High School Musical films. Hindi-Dubbed Tsubasa Otori in Beyblade: Metal Fusion, Tsubasa Otori, Zeo Abyss in Beyblade: Metal Masters. | *Brother of Ami Trivedi who's also a dubbing artist. |
| Karishma Randhawa | Hindi | - | - |
| Kavita Kaushik | Hindi | - | - |
| Kavitha Krishnamurthy | Hindi | - | - |
| Kaniha | Tamil | Sadha in Anniyan, Shriya Saran in Sivaji, Genelia in Sachein | |
| Krushna Abhishek | Hindi | Dubbed in Hindi for Varun Tej in F3: Fun and Frustration, Raghava Lawrence in Chandramukhi 2 and Vijay in Leo. | |

== L ==
| Name | Language(s) spoken | Known roles | Notes |
|---|---|---|---|
| Leela Roy Ghosh | English | Founder of Sound & Vision India. | |
| Leela Roy Ghosh | Hindi | Founder of Sound & Vision India. | |
| Leela Roy Ghosh | Urdu | Founder of Sound & Vision India. | |
| Leela Roy Ghosh | Marathi | Founder of Sound & Vision India. | |
| Leela Roy Ghosh | Bengali | Founder of Sound & Vision India. | |

== M ==
| Name | Language(s) spoken | Known roles | Notes |
|---|---|---|---|
| M. M. Manasi | Tamil | Known for dubbing Tamannaah's line in her films. | She is also a playback singer |
| M. M. Manasi | Telugu | Known for dubbing Tamannaah's line in her films. | She is also a playback singer |
| Malavika Shivpuri | English | Official Hindi dub-over voice artist for Hebrew actress Gal Gadot | - |
| Malavika Shivpuri | Hindi | Official Hindi dub-over voice artist for Hebrew actress Gal Gadot | - |
| Manasi Sinha | Bengali | Bengali dubbing voice for Kovai Sarala in Kanchana 2 | - |
| Manish Kaushik | English | Official Hindi dubbed voice of High Evolutionary in Guardians of the Galaxy Vol. 3 | - |
| Manish Kaushik | Hindi | Official Hindi dubbed voice of High Evolutionary in Guardians of the Galaxy Vol. 3 | - |
| Manish Kaushik | Haryanvi | Official Hindi dubbed voice of High Evolutionary in Guardians of the Galaxy Vol. 3 | - |
| Manish Wadhwa | English | He is known for dubbing for Sebastian Stan as Bucky Barnes / Winter Soldier in Marvel movies in Hindi. | - |
| Manish Wadhwa | Hindi | He is known for dubbing for Sebastian Stan as Bucky Barnes / Winter Soldier in Marvel movies in Hindi. | - |
| Mayur Vyas | English | Dubbed in Hindi for Tamil actors Rajinikanth & Vijay Sethupathi and also for Telugu comic actor Posani Krishna Murali. | - |
| Mayur Vyas | Hindi | Dubbed in Hindi for Tamil actors Rajinikanth & Vijay Sethupathi and also for Telugu comic actor Posani Krishna Murali. | - |
| Meena Gokuldas | English | - | - |
| Meena Gokuldas | Hindi | - | - |
| Meena | Tamil | Padmapriya in Pokkisham | - |
| Meghana Erande | English | Voice of Ninja Hattori-Kun, Nova (Super Robot Monkey Team Hyperforce Go), Ronny (Power Rangers Operation Overdrive), Toph (Avatar : The Last Airbender), Nikki (Life Mein Twist), Ericka Van Helsing (Hotel Transylvania) and many more movies | She has also given voice in Krishna aur Kans 3D as Baby Krishna and in many more animated movies |
| Meghana Erande | Hindi | Voice of Ninja Hattori-Kun, Nova (Super Robot Monkey Team Hyperforce Go), Ronny (Power Rangers Operation Overdrive), Toph (Avatar : The Last Airbender), Nikki (Life Mein Twist), Ericka Van Helsing (Hotel Transylvania) and many more movies | She has also given voice in Krishna aur Kans 3D as Baby Krishna and in many more animated movies |
| Meghana Erande | Marathi | Voice of Ninja Hattori-Kun, Nova (Super Robot Monkey Team Hyperforce Go), Ronny (Power Rangers Operation Overdrive), Toph (Avatar : The Last Airbender), Nikki (Life Mein Twist), Ericka Van Helsing (Hotel Transylvania) and many more movies | She has also given voice in Krishna aur Kans 3D as Baby Krishna and in many more animated movies |
| Mohan Kapur | English | Hindi voice for Benedict Cumberbatch as Doctor Strange in the Marvel Cinematic Universe and Dwayne Johnson as Hobbs in the Fast & Furious movies | - |
| Mohan Kapur | Hindi | Hindi voice for Benedict Cumberbatch as Doctor Strange in the Marvel Cinematic Universe and Dwayne Johnson as Hobbs in the Fast & Furious movies | - |
| Mona Ghosh Shetty | English | Hindi dubbed for many leading female roles featuring actresses such as Cameron Diaz, Angelina Jolie, Kate Beckinsale, Kirsten Dunst, Halle Berry, Zoe Saldaña, Drew Barrymore, Catherine Zeta-Jones, Jacqueline Fernandez, Katrina Kaif, Deepika Padukone and other celebrities. | President of Sound & Vision India |
| Mona Ghosh Shetty | Hindi | Hindi dubbed for many leading female roles featuring actresses such as Cameron Diaz, Angelina Jolie, Kate Beckinsale, Kirsten Dunst, Halle Berry, Zoe Saldaña, Drew Barrymore, Catherine Zeta-Jones, Jacqueline Fernandez, Katrina Kaif, Deepika Padukone and other celebrities. | President of Sound & Vision India |
| Mona Ghosh Shetty | Urdu | Hindi dubbed for many leading female roles featuring actresses such as Cameron Diaz, Angelina Jolie, Kate Beckinsale, Kirsten Dunst, Halle Berry, Zoe Saldaña, Drew Barrymore, Catherine Zeta-Jones, Jacqueline Fernandez, Katrina Kaif, Deepika Padukone and other celebrities. | President of Sound & Vision India |
| Mona Ghosh Shetty | Marathi | Hindi dubbed for many leading female roles featuring actresses such as Cameron Diaz, Angelina Jolie, Kate Beckinsale, Kirsten Dunst, Halle Berry, Zoe Saldaña, Drew Barrymore, Catherine Zeta-Jones, Jacqueline Fernandez, Katrina Kaif, Deepika Padukone and other celebrities. | President of Sound & Vision India |
| Mona Ghosh Shetty | Bengali | Hindi dubbed for many leading female roles featuring actresses such as Cameron Diaz, Angelina Jolie, Kate Beckinsale, Kirsten Dunst, Halle Berry, Zoe Saldaña, Drew Barrymore, Catherine Zeta-Jones, Jacqueline Fernandez, Katrina Kaif, Deepika Padukone and other celebrities. | President of Sound & Vision India |

== N ==
| Name | Language(s) spoken | Known roles | Notes |
|---|---|---|---|
| Nachiket Dighe | Hindi | *Hindi-Dubbed for Rupert Grint as Ron Weasley in the Harry Potter films 2-8. *Hindi-Dubbed for Ryne Sanborn as Jason Cross in the High School Musical films. *Hindi voice of Tracey Sketchit in the first Hindi dub and Ash Ketchum in second Hindi dub of the Pokémon. | *In Pokémon, He voiced Tracey in the Sound & Vision India Hindi dub. For the UTV Software Communications in-house Hindi dub for Hungama TV, he was chosen to be the voice of Ash. |
| Nachiket Dighe | Marathi | *Hindi-Dubbed for Rupert Grint as Ron Weasley in the Harry Potter films 2-8. *Hindi-Dubbed for Ryne Sanborn as Jason Cross in the High School Musical films. *Hindi voice of Tracey Sketchit in the first Hindi dub and Ash Ketchum in second Hindi dub of the Pokémon. | *In Pokémon, He voiced Tracey in the Sound & Vision India Hindi dub. For the UTV Software Communications in-house Hindi dub for Hungama TV, he was chosen to be the voice of Ash. |
| Nachiket Dighe | English | *Hindi-Dubbed for Rupert Grint as Ron Weasley in the Harry Potter films 2-8. *Hindi-Dubbed for Ryne Sanborn as Jason Cross in the High School Musical films. *Hindi voice of Tracey Sketchit in the first Hindi dub and Ash Ketchum in second Hindi dub of the Pokémon. | *In Pokémon, He voiced Tracey in the Sound & Vision India Hindi dub. For the UTV Software Communications in-house Hindi dub for Hungama TV, he was chosen to be the voice of Ash. |
| Nassar | English | See Nassar filmography and awards#As dubbing artist | - |
| Nassar | Hindi | See Nassar filmography and awards#As dubbing artist | - |
| Nassar | Telugu | See Nassar filmography and awards#As dubbing artist | - |
| Nassar | Malayalam | See Nassar filmography and awards#As dubbing artist | - |
| Nassar | Kannada | See Nassar filmography and awards#As dubbing artist | - |
| Neshma Chemburkar | Hindi | Hindi voice of May in Pokemon, Kenichi's mom in Ninja Hattori, Mummy Pig in Peppa Pig, Scarlett Johansson in Marvel Cinematic Universe | |
| Neshma Chemburkar | Marathi | Hindi voice of May in Pokemon, Kenichi's mom in Ninja Hattori, Mummy Pig in Peppa Pig, Scarlett Johansson in Marvel Cinematic Universe | |
| Neshma Chemburkar | English | Hindi voice of May in Pokemon, Kenichi's mom in Ninja Hattori, Mummy Pig in Peppa Pig, Scarlett Johansson in Marvel Cinematic Universe | |
| Ninad Kamat | Hindi | Hindi voice of Josh Brolin as Thanos in Avengers: Infinity War and Avengers: Endgame and Bradley Cooper as Rocket Raccoon in Guardians of the Galaxy Vol. 2, Avengers: Infinity War and Avengers: Endgame movies. Also Hindi voice of Nicolas Cage in Spider-Noir. | Ninad is also a TV and film actor. |
| Nizhalgal Ravi | Tamil | Jackie Shroff in Bigil, few of Amitabh Bachchan's Tamil dubbed versions of Hindi movies | - |

== P ==
| Name | Language(s) spoken | Known roles | Notes |
|---|---|---|---|
| P. Ravi Shankar | Tamil | He has dubbed for several negative characters in South Indian movies in Tamil, Telugu, Kannada, Malayalam languages for Sonu Sood, Ashish Vidyarthi, Ashutosh Rana, Pradeep Rawat, Boman Irani, Ravi Kishan, Mukesh Rishi, Sathyaraj, Abhimanyu Singh and several other actors. | He is also a well known face in Kannada industry mainly for portraying negative roles. He has also worked in several South Indian movies in Tamil, Telugu industry. |
| P. Ravi Shankar | Telugu | He has dubbed for several negative characters in South Indian movies in Tamil, Telugu, Kannada, Malayalam languages for Sonu Sood, Ashish Vidyarthi, Ashutosh Rana, Pradeep Rawat, Boman Irani, Ravi Kishan, Mukesh Rishi, Sathyaraj, Abhimanyu Singh and several other actors. | He is also a well known face in Kannada industry mainly for portraying negative roles. He has also worked in several South Indian movies in Tamil, Telugu industry. |
| P. Ravi Shankar | Kannada | He has dubbed for several negative characters in South Indian movies in Tamil, Telugu, Kannada, Malayalam languages for Sonu Sood, Ashish Vidyarthi, Ashutosh Rana, Pradeep Rawat, Boman Irani, Ravi Kishan, Mukesh Rishi, Sathyaraj, Abhimanyu Singh and several other actors. | He is also a well known face in Kannada industry mainly for portraying negative roles. He has also worked in several South Indian movies in Tamil, Telugu industry. |
| Parignya Pandya Shah | English | *Hindi-dubbed for Emma Watson as Hermione Granger in the Harry Potter films 3-8. *Hindi-dubbed for Gwen Tennyson in the Ben 10 franchise. | - |
| Parignya Pandya Shah | Hindi | *Hindi-dubbed for Emma Watson as Hermione Granger in the Harry Potter films 3-8. *Hindi-dubbed for Gwen Tennyson in the Ben 10 franchise. | - |
| Parignya Pandya Shah | Gujarati | *Hindi-dubbed for Emma Watson as Hermione Granger in the Harry Potter films 3-8. *Hindi-dubbed for Gwen Tennyson in the Ben 10 franchise. | - |
| Parminder Ghumman | English | *Hindi-dubbed for Megatron in Transformers films 1-3. | - |
| Parminder Ghumman | Hindi | *Hindi-dubbed for Megatron in Transformers films 1-3. | - |
| Parminder Ghumman | Punjabi | *Hindi-dubbed for Megatron in Transformers films 1-3. | - |
| Parminder Ghumman | Oriya | *Hindi-dubbed for Megatron in Transformers films 1-3. | - |
| Pawan Kalra | English | *Official Hindi dub-over artist for Arnold Schwarzenegger for his films dubbed for later VCD/DVD releases and TV airings. *Hindi voice for Bob the Builder. Also, he's the Hindi voice behind south actor Ajith Kumar and several negative characters for South Indian movies. *Also voice of Baba Banda Singh Bahadur in Chaar Sahibzaade (in Hindi and Punjabi both). He has Dubbed Hindi for Henry Cavill in The Witcher | - |
| Pawan Kalra | Hindi | *Official Hindi dub-over artist for Arnold Schwarzenegger for his films dubbed for later VCD/DVD releases and TV airings. *Hindi voice for Bob the Builder. Also, he's the Hindi voice behind south actor Ajith Kumar and several negative characters for South Indian movies. *Also voice of Baba Banda Singh Bahadur in Chaar Sahibzaade (in Hindi and Punjabi both). He has Dubbed Hindi for Henry Cavill in The Witcher | - |
| Pawan Kalra | Punjabi | *Official Hindi dub-over artist for Arnold Schwarzenegger for his films dubbed for later VCD/DVD releases and TV airings. *Hindi voice for Bob the Builder. Also, he's the Hindi voice behind south actor Ajith Kumar and several negative characters for South Indian movies. *Also voice of Baba Banda Singh Bahadur in Chaar Sahibzaade (in Hindi and Punjabi both). He has Dubbed Hindi for Henry Cavill in The Witcher | - |
| Prachi Save Saathi | English | *Official Hindi dubbing voice for Minnie Mouse. *Hindi-Dubbed Georgie Henley as Lucy Pevensie in The Chronicles of Narnia film series. | - |
| Prachi Save Saathi | Hindi | *Official Hindi dubbing voice for Minnie Mouse. *Hindi-Dubbed Georgie Henley as Lucy Pevensie in The Chronicles of Narnia film series. | - |
| Prasad Barve | English | Gave the Hindi dubbing voice to Ash Ketchum in the first Hindi dub of Pokémon. Hindi voice of Vegeta in Dragon Ball Z. Hindi voice for Po in the Kung Fu Panda franchise. | The version that Prasad voiced Ash was in the Crest Animation Studios/Sound & Vision India Hindi dub for Cartoon Network and Pogo., Also the official voice for characters Amara in Ninja - Hattori Kun and Perman in Perman. |
| Prasad Barve | Hindi | Gave the Hindi dubbing voice to Ash Ketchum in the first Hindi dub of Pokémon. Hindi voice of Vegeta in Dragon Ball Z. Hindi voice for Po in the Kung Fu Panda franchise. | The version that Prasad voiced Ash was in the Crest Animation Studios/Sound & Vision India Hindi dub for Cartoon Network and Pogo., Also the official voice for characters Amara in Ninja - Hattori Kun and Perman in Perman. |
| Prasad Barve | Marathi | Gave the Hindi dubbing voice to Ash Ketchum in the first Hindi dub of Pokémon. Hindi voice of Vegeta in Dragon Ball Z. Hindi voice for Po in the Kung Fu Panda franchise. | The version that Prasad voiced Ash was in the Crest Animation Studios/Sound & Vision India Hindi dub for Cartoon Network and Pogo., Also the official voice for characters Amara in Ninja - Hattori Kun and Perman in Perman. |

== R ==
| Name | Language(s) spoken | Known roles | Notes |
|---|---|---|---|
| Rahul Seth | Hindi | - | - |
| Rajesh Jolly | English | Dubbed in Hindi for Suman in Sivaji: The Boss & Rudhramadevi. | - |
| Rajesh Jolly | Hindi | Dubbed in Hindi for Suman in Sivaji: The Boss & Rudhramadevi. | - |
| Rajesh Jolly | Punjabi | Dubbed in Hindi for Suman in Sivaji: The Boss & Rudhramadevi. | - |
| Rajesh Kava | Hindi | Dubbed in Hindi for Daniel Radcliffe as Harry Potter for the Harry Potter films 6-8. Hindi voice of Jaggu Bandar in Chhota Bheem. Also dubbed for Tamil actors Vijay, Dhanush and especially N. Santhanam. Also dubbed in Hindi for Telugu superstar Mahesh Babu in Bharat Ane Nenu (Hindi dub released on YouTube but deleted). | - |
| Rajesh Khattar | English | Provided Hindi dubbing for leading roles of feature actors including Tom Hanks, Johnny Depp, Hugh Jackman, Robert Downey Jr., Dwayne Johnson, Nicolas Cage, Lambert Wilson, Michael Fassbender, and more. Also provided the voice for Tony Stark in the MCU and Captain Jack Sparrow in the Pirates of the Caribbean series. | - |
| Rajesh Khattar | Hindi | Provided Hindi dubbing for leading roles of feature actors including Tom Hanks, Johnny Depp, Hugh Jackman, Robert Downey Jr., Dwayne Johnson, Nicolas Cage, Lambert Wilson, Michael Fassbender, and more. Also provided the voice for Tony Stark in the MCU and Captain Jack Sparrow in the Pirates of the Caribbean series. | - |
| Rajesh Khattar | Punjabi | Provided Hindi dubbing for leading roles of feature actors including Tom Hanks, Johnny Depp, Hugh Jackman, Robert Downey Jr., Dwayne Johnson, Nicolas Cage, Lambert Wilson, Michael Fassbender, and more. Also provided the voice for Tony Stark in the MCU and Captain Jack Sparrow in the Pirates of the Caribbean series. | - |
| Radhika Sarathkumar | Tamil | Best known for Voice over for Actress Radha in Mudhal Mariyadhai | |
| Rajesh Vedprakash | English | - | - |
| Rajesh Vedprakash | Hindi | - | - |
| Rajesh Vedprakash | Urdu | - | - |
| Raju Shrestha | English | - | - |
| Raju Shrestha | Hindi | - | - |
| Rakshanda Khan | Hindi | Known for voicing Helen Parr/Elastigirl in the Hindi dub version of The Incredibles. | - |
| Raveena Ravi | Tamil | Dubbed in Saattai, Ainthu Ainthu Ainthu, Nimirndhu Nil, Kaththi (for Samantha Akkineni), I (for Amy Jackson), Anegan (for Amyra Dastur) | |
| Raveena Ravi | Hindi | Dubbed in Saattai, Ainthu Ainthu Ainthu, Nimirndhu Nil, Kaththi (for Samantha Akkineni), I (for Amy Jackson), Anegan (for Amyra Dastur) | |
| Raveena Ravi | Malayalam | Dubbed in Saattai, Ainthu Ainthu Ainthu, Nimirndhu Nil, Kaththi (for Samantha Akkineni), I (for Amy Jackson), Anegan (for Amyra Dastur) | |
| Raveena Ravi | Telugu | Dubbed in Saattai, Ainthu Ainthu Ainthu, Nimirndhu Nil, Kaththi (for Samantha Akkineni), I (for Amy Jackson), Anegan (for Amyra Dastur) | |
| Ravishankar Devanarayanan | Tamil | Dubbed for Iron Man (franchise) as Tony Stark / Iron Man | |
| Rishabh Shukla | Hindi | *Hindi-Dubbed Ralph Fiennes as Lord Voldemort for the Harry Potter films 4-8. *Dubbed in Hindi for Nagarjuna in Don (Hindi dub titled Don No. 1). | - |
| Revathi | Tamil | *Voice over for Actress Tabu in Kandukondain Kandukondain, Snehithiye, Actress Suvalakshmi in Aasai. | - |
| Roja Ramani | Telugu | *Lent her voice for over 400 films in Telugu and Tamil for all the leading heroines. | - |
| Roja Ramani | Tamil | *Lent her voice for over 400 films in Telugu and Tamil for all the leading heroines. | - |
| Rohini | Tamil | *Lent her voice for Manisha Koirala (Indian, Mapillai), Sonali Kulkarni ( May Madham), Aishwariya Rai (Raavana) among various other actress and movies o | - |

== S ==
| Name | Language(s) spoken | Known roles | Notes |
|---|---|---|---|
| Sunitha Upadrasta | Telugu | Known for voice of Sita in Sri Rama Rajyam for Nayanthara She had given her voice to more than 110 lead female artists in Telugu Films covering more than 800 movies. | |
| S. P. Sailaja | Tamil | | |
| S. P. Sailaja | Telugu | | |
| S. P. Sailaja | Kannada | | |
| S. P. Sailaja | Malayalam | | |
| Sai Kumar | Tamil | | |
| Sai Kumar | Telugu | | |
| Sai Kumar | Kannada | | |
| Salim Ghouse | Hindi | | |
| Salim Ghouse | Tamil | | |
| Salim Ghouse | Malayalam | | |
| Sukanya | Tamil | Voice over for Nandita Das in Kannathil Muthamittal | - |
| Suhasini | Tamil | Voice over for Shobana in Thalapathi, Heera Rajagopal in Thiruda Thiruda | |
| Samay Raj Thakkar | Hindi | *Known as the Hindi voice of Batman. *Also as the Hindi voice of Hulk. *He is also known as the Hindi voice of Kattappa played by Tamil actor Sathyaraj in Baahubali series. Also he's the Hindi voice behind Nagarjuna, Nandamuri Balakrishna, Jagapathi Babu, Vikram and Ajith Kumar | - |
| Saumya Daan | English | *Dubbed in Hindi for James and Oliver Phelps as Fred and George Weasley in the Harry Potter film series. *Official Hindi dub-over artist for Shia LaBeouf and Joe Jonas. *Dubbed in Hindi for Mahesh Babu in Pokiri. | - |
| Saumya Daan | Hindi | *Dubbed in Hindi for James and Oliver Phelps as Fred and George Weasley in the Harry Potter film series. *Official Hindi dub-over artist for Shia LaBeouf and Joe Jonas. *Dubbed in Hindi for Mahesh Babu in Pokiri. | - |
| Saumya Daan | Bengali | *Dubbed in Hindi for James and Oliver Phelps as Fred and George Weasley in the Harry Potter film series. *Official Hindi dub-over artist for Shia LaBeouf and Joe Jonas. *Dubbed in Hindi for Mahesh Babu in Pokiri. | - |
| Saumya Daan | Marathi | *Dubbed in Hindi for James and Oliver Phelps as Fred and George Weasley in the Harry Potter film series. *Official Hindi dub-over artist for Shia LaBeouf and Joe Jonas. *Dubbed in Hindi for Mahesh Babu in Pokiri. | - |
| Saritha | Telugu | Various Actress in 1990s and 2000s including prominent actress Meena, Nagma and Vijayashanti | - |
| Saritha | Tamil | Various Actress in 1990s and 2000s including prominent actress Meena, Nagma and Vijayashanti | - |
| Savitha Reddy | Tamil | | - |
| Savitha Reddy | Telugu | | - |
| Sekar | Tamil | *Dubbed in Tamil for Deadpool as Wade Willson/ Deadpool, Ant-Man and the Wasp as Scott Lang /Ant-Man, Tamil voice of Shahrukh Khan, Baahubali (franchise) as Prabhas (Amrendra Baahubali) | |
| Shakti Singh | Hindi | *Dubbed for character Captain Haddock in 3D animation The Adventures of Tintin. *Hindi voice for Hollywood actors Samuel L. Jackson, Huge Jackman, Kevin Spacey, Daniel Craig (James Bond movies), Bruce Willis and many popular Hollywood male actors. *Also dubbed for South Indian actors Chiranjeevi, Jagapathi Babu, Prakash Raj and Mohanlal. | He has acted in 'Nukkad', 'Byomkesh Bakshi' and many TV serials and Hindi films. |
| Shammi Narang | Hindi | - | - |
| Sharad Kelkar | Hindi | Hindi voice of Prabhas as Bahubali, Varun Tej in Gaddalakonda Ganesh and Ram Charan in Vinaya Vidheya Rama. | - |
| Sharad Kelkar | Marathi | Hindi voice of Prabhas as Bahubali, Varun Tej in Gaddalakonda Ganesh and Ram Charan in Vinaya Vidheya Rama. | - |
| Sowmya Sharma | Telugu | Anushka Shetty, Amala Paul, Kajal Aggarwal, Bhavana, Nayanthara | |
| Sravana Bhargavi | Telugu | - | - |
| Sreeja Ravi | English | - | - |
| Sreeja Ravi | Hindi | - | - |
| Sreeja Ravi | Tamil | - | - |
| Sreeja Ravi | Telugu | - | - |
| Sreeja Ravi | Kannada | - | - |
| Sreeja Ravi | Bengali | - | - |
| Sreeja Ravi | Malayalam | - | - |
| Suchitra Pillai | Hindi | Voice for Angelina Jolie (Beowulf), Maggie Gyllenhaal (The Dark Knight), Cate Blanchett (Thor, Ragnarok) | - |
| S. N. Surendar | Tamil | Official voice for actor Mohan and also for actors Karthik, Arjun and various others in their initial stages | - |
| Sumeet Raghavan | Hindi | Hindi dubbed for Chris Tucker as Detective James Carter in the 2001 action comedy flick Rush Hour 2, Official Dubbing Artist for actor Martin Lawrence | - |
| Sumit Kaul | Hindi | Hindi dubbed for Domnhall Gleeson as General Hux in Star Wars | - |
| Sumit Kaul | English | Hindi dubbed for Domnhall Gleeson as General Hux in Star Wars | - |
| Suresh Oberoi | Hindi | - | - |
| Suresh | Tamil | Voice actor for Ajith in Aasai | - |
| Shahnawaz Pradhan | Hindi | *Dubbed in Hindi for South Indian actors Cochin Haneefa and Kota Srinivasa Rao. *Dubbed in Hindi for British actors Jonathan Pryce, Michael Caine and Michael Gough. | |
| Sahil Vaid | Hindi | *Dubbed in Hindi for South Indian actors Arun Vijay, Harish Uthaman and Unni Mukundan. *Dubbed in Hindi for Hollywood actors Paul Rudd, Tom Cruise and Bradley Cooper. Also a film actor. | |
| Sonal Kaushal | Hindi | *Official Voice Of Doraemon, Chhota Bheem, Gabby Gabby In Toy Story 4 And many more | |
| Sourav Chakraborty | Hindi | Dubbed in Hindi for South Indian actor Brahmanandam and Venu Madhav. Voice of Motu, Patlu, Dr. Jhatka, Ghasita Ram, Boxer, John, Inspector Chingum, Oggy, Jack, Bob, Joey, Dee Dee, Marky, Zig, Bernie, Sharko, Shaun and many more. | |

== T ==
| Name | Language(s) spoken | Known roles | Notes |
|---|---|---|---|
| Tarana Raja | English | *Hindi-dubbed for 300 (First Hindi dub), and Eragon. | - |
| Tarana Raja | Hindi | *Hindi-dubbed for 300 (First Hindi dub), and Eragon. | - |
| Tina Parekh | Hindi | *Hindi-dubbed for Karen Gillan as Nebula in Marvel Cinematic Universe. | - |
| Toshi Sinha | Hindi | *Hindi-Dubbed Anna Popplewell as Susan Pevensie in The Chronicles of Narnia film series. *Official Hindi dub-over artist for Ramya Krishnan in Bahubali an others, Raven-Symoné. *Dubbed in Hindi for Anushka Shetty, Hansika Motwani, Trisha Krishnan and Nithya Menen in some of their movies. | - |

== U ==
| Name | Language(s) spoken | Known roles | Notes |
|---|---|---|---|
| Urvi Ashar | English | *Known as the Hindi voice of Candace Flynn in Phineas and Ferb. *Dubbed in Hindi for actresses Kajal Aggarwal, Tamannaah Bhatia and Hansika Motwani in their Tamil and Telugu movies. | - |
| Urvi Ashar | Hindi | *Known as the Hindi voice of Candace Flynn in Phineas and Ferb. *Dubbed in Hindi for actresses Kajal Aggarwal, Tamannaah Bhatia and Hansika Motwani in their Tamil and Telugu movies. | - |
| Urvi Ashar | Marathi | *Known as the Hindi voice of Candace Flynn in Phineas and Ferb. *Dubbed in Hindi for actresses Kajal Aggarwal, Tamannaah Bhatia and Hansika Motwani in their Tamil and Telugu movies. | - |
| Uday Sabnis | English | *Hindi-dubbed Richard Griffiths as Vernon Dursley in the Harry Potter film series. | - |
| Uday Sabnis | Hindi | *Hindi-dubbed Richard Griffiths as Vernon Dursley in the Harry Potter film series. | - |
| Uday Sabnis | Marathi | *Hindi-dubbed Richard Griffiths as Vernon Dursley in the Harry Potter film series. | - |

== V ==
| Name | Language(s) spoken | Known roles | Notes |
|---|---|---|---|
| Vinay Nadkarni | Telugu | *Official Hindi voice for Donald Duck. | - |
| Vinod Kulkarni | Hindi | *Hindi dubbed for Brahmanandam in many South Indian movies | - |
| Vineeth | Malayalam | Voice dubbed for Vivek Oberoi for Lucifer, Kaduva, Arbaaz Khan for Big Brother, Arjun Sarja for Marakkar | - |
| Vikrant Chaturvedi | Hindi | *Hindi-dubbed Michael Gambon as Albus Dumbledore in the Harry Potter films 4-8 | |
| Vikram | Tamil | * Voice over for actor Ajith in Amaravathi, Prabhudeva and Abbas in various movies | |
| Vrajesh Hirjee | English | - | - |
| Vrajesh Hirjee | Hindi | - | - |
| Vrajesh Hirjee | Gujarati | - | - |
