= Ghatothkach =

2008 film by Singeetam Srinivasa Rao

- Theatrical release poster
- Directed by: Singeetam Srinivasa Rao
- Screenplay by: Singeetam Srinivasa Rao
- Dialogues by: Aparajit Shukla; Ashmith Kunder; Raavikondal Rao (Telugu)
- Story by: Singeetam Srinivasa Rao
- Produced by: Vinod Suryadevara; Smita Maroo
- Edited by: Ashmith Kunder
- Music by: Songs: Singeetam Srinivasa Rao; Score: Pravin Mani
- Production company: Shemaroo Entertainment
- Release date: 23 May 2008 (India)
- Running time: 101 minutes
- Country: India
- Language: Hindi
- Budget: ₹6.50 crore
- Box office: ₹1.52 crore

Ghatothkach is a 2008 Indian Hindi-language animated film based on the life of the Mahabharata character Ghatotkacha, the son of Bhima and Hidimba. The film is written and directed by Singeetam Srinivasa Rao, who also scored the soundtrack and was previously associated with the 1957 Telugu film, Mayabazar. The film was premiered at the 2008 Cannes Film Festival in the International Critics' Week, and was also premiered to special mention at the Grand Finale – Children's Film Festival 2014 of the 44th International Film Festival of India.

It was followed by a direct-to-video sequel, Ghatothkach 2, in 2013. Directed by Vijay S. Bhanushali and Smita Maroo, it further follows the adventures of the child Ghatotkacha.

== Voice cast ==
- Sandip Karnik as Ghatotkacha
  - Malak Shah as Young Ghatotkacha
  - Meghana Erande as Baby Ghatotkacha "Ghattu"
- Prasad Barve as Gajju
  - Meghana Erande as Kid Gajju
- Gufi Paintal as Shakuni
- Samay Raj Thakkar as Duryodhana
- Rakhee Sharma as Hidimba
- Girish Sahdev as Kantakasura
- Ankur Javeri as Abhimanyu
  - Aditya Rao as Young Abhimanyu
- Neshma Chemburkar as Surekha
  - Aparna Bhagwat as Young Surekha
- Viraj Adhav as Krishna
- Shakti Singh as Balrama
- Namrata Sawhney as Rukmini and Revathi
- Rajeev Raj as Lakshmana Kumara and Mardhana
- Manish Bhawan as Vimardhana and Chanda
- Omi Sharma as Prachanda and Jambuka
- Rakesh Chaturvedi as Shambuka
- Rajshree Nath Sharma as Subhadra
- Uday Sabnis as Narrator

Ganesh Divekar and Meghana Erande provided the animal voices in the film in Hindi and Marathi.

== Soundtrack ==
All lyrics are written by Sameer; all music is composed by Singeetam Srinivasa Rao.

Track listing
No.	Title	Singer(s)	Length
1.	"Main Hoon Ghatothkach (Child Version)"	Shravan	2:18
2.	"Maya Bazaar"	Daler Mehndi, Sudesh Bhonsle	3:31
3.	"Natnaagar Ki Hai Saari Leela"	Mahalakshmi Iyer	5:15
4.	"Main Yahan Tu Wahaan"	Shreya Ghoshal, Shaan	4:05
5.	"Angalik Bangalik Jaadu Hai"	Shravan	3:50
6.	"Sajaa Hai Bhojnaley"	S. P. Balasubrahmanyam	3:01
7.	"Aana Aaja Na"	Sunidhi Chauhan, Sudesh Bhonsle	2:52
8.	"Main Hoon Ghatothkach (Adult Version)"	Sudesh Bhonsle	2:17
Total length:			27:09

== Reception ==
Sukanya Verma of Rediff.com gave the film 2.5 out of 5, writing, "While this 2D animation might not be ground-breaking and the second half stands on shaky ground with its song 'n' dance overload, Ghatothkach has its enjoyable moments".

== See also ==
- List of indian animated feature films
