= Meena Gokuldas =

Indian voice actress

- Born: Mumbai, India
- Other names: Meena Goculdas; Mina Gokuldas
- Occupations: Voice actor; Director
- Years active: 1986–present

Meena Gokulas is an Indian voice actress who is known for voice acting in Indian animation and for contributing dubbing for foreign content in Hindi language. She is also a dubbing director, considering that she has directed some Hindi-dubbed productions for foreign content. She can speak English and Hindi.

She currently lives in Malabar Hill, Mumbai.

== Dubbing career ==
As of 2014, she has been involved in the dubbing industry for about 28 years—she has been dubbing for foreign productions as early as 1986.

Meena Gokuldas has also given her voice for Bollywood movie Main Prem Ki Diwani Hoon for the parrot character Raja.

== Filmography ==
=== Animated films ===
Year	Film title	Role	Language(s)	Notes
2012	Krishna Aur Kans	Gwalan	Hindi	Credited as: Meena Goculdas.

== Dubbing roles ==
=== Animated series ===
Program title	Original voice(s)	Character(s)	Dub language	Original language	Number of episodes	Original airdate	Dubbed airdate	Notes
The Flintstones	Bea Benaderet †	Betty Rubble	Hindi	English	166	9/30/1960- 4/1/1966	1/4/1999-2006	Aired on Cartoon Network India and has been shown dubbed in Hindi, on 4 January 1999 when the channel started providing their content in the Hindi-dubbed format. Much later then after their original release.
The Jetsons	Penny Singleton †	Jane Jetson	Hindi	English	75	9/23/1962- 3/17/1963 (first run); 9/16/1985- 11/12/1987 (second run)	1/4/1999-2004	Aired on Cartoon Network India and has been shown dubbed in Hindi, on 4 January 1999 when the channel started providing their content in the Hindi-dubbed format. Much later then after their original release.
Oswald	Crystal Scales	Daisy	Hindi	English	29	8/21/2001-2004		Aired on Zee TV and on Pogo dubbed in Hindi.
Make Way for Noddy	Kathleen Barr; Chantal Strand	Martha Monkey; Mrs. Skittle	Hindi	English	39	9/2/2002-2008		Meena has voiced for two characters in the Hindi Dub. Aired on Cartoon Network India and Pogo.
The Powerpuff Girls	Jennifer Hale	Princess Morbucks	Hindi	English	78 (Dubbed 6)	11/18/1998- 3/25/2005	2000-2005	Dubbed for this character for six episodes throughout the first four seasons. Meghana Erande took over for her Hindi voice towards Seasons 5 and 6.

=== Live action television series ===
Program title	Original actor(s)/actress(es)	Character(s)	Dubbed language	Original language	Original year release	Dubbed year release	Note(s)
Adını Feriha Koydum	Vahide Perçin	Zehra	Hindi	Turkish	2010	September 2015-March 2016	Dubbed for Zindagi Channel show Feriha. The character of Zehra was appreciated by the viewers.

=== Live action films ===
Film title	Original actor(s)/actress(es)	Character(s)	Dubbed language	Original language	Original year release	Dubbed year release	Note(s)
Pretty Woman	Julia Roberts	Vivian Ward	Hindi	English	1990	2005	Dubbed for the Home video release such as for DVD.
Dark Shadows	Helena Bonham Carter Chloë Grace Moretz Gulliver McGrath	Dr. Julia Hoffman Carolyn Stoddard David Collins	Hindi	English	2012	2012	Dubbed for three characters in the VCD version. The Hindi dub was titled Khuunee Saaya (खूनी सायें), meaning Bloody Shadows.
Hellboy II: The Golden Army	Anna Walton Montse Ribé	Princess Nuala Young Hellboy	Hindi	English	2008	2008	Performed alongside Shanoor Mirza who voiced Luke Goss as Prince Nuada, Mayur Vyas who voiced Ron Perlman as Hellboy, Atul Kapoor who voiced Jeffrey Tambor as Tom Manning.

=== Animated films ===
Film title	Original voice(s)	Character(s)	Dub language	Original language	Original year release	Dub year release	Notes
Barbie: Mariposa and the Fairy Princess	Kathleen Barr	Gwyllion	Hindi	English	2013	2013 (TV version)	Voiced for the TV version that aired on 5 September 2013 on Pogo. A VCD/DVD release had a different Hindi dubbing cast which was released before it on 4 September 2013.
