= Manish Kaushik =

Manish Kaushik may refer to:

- Manish Kaushik (voice actor) (born 1980), Indian voice-dubbing artist
- Manish Kaushik (boxer) (born 1996), Indian boxer
