= Ami Trivedi =

Indian television actress (born 1982)

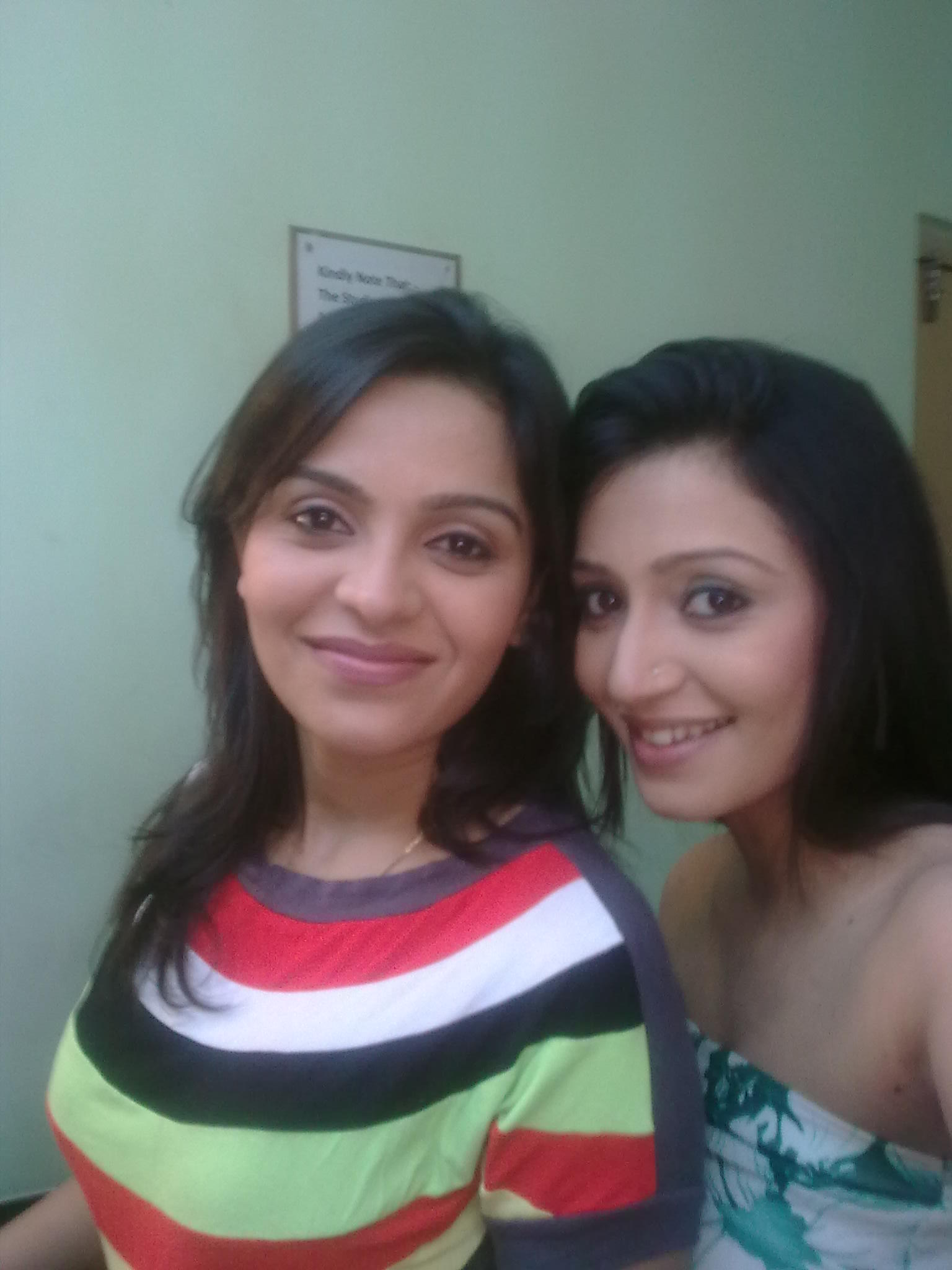
- Ami Trivedi (left) on the sets of Bajega Band Baaja, 2009
- Born: 15 July 1982 (age 44); Mumbai, Maharashtra, India
- Occupations: Television actress, voice actress & theatre artist
- Years active: 1992; 1994; 2000–2015; 2018; 2021–present
- Spouse: Neeraj Sanghai (m. 2009)
- Relatives: Karan Trivedi (brother)

Ami Trivedi (born 15 July 1982) is an Indian television and theatre artist. She is most known for her roles of Kituu in Kituu Sab Janti Hai (2005–06) and Kokila in popular comedy sitcom Papad Pol (2010–11). She was last seen as Manjari Birla in Yeh Rishta Kya Kehlata Hai.

Trivedi has done Gujarati theatre for many years and has appeared in number of Hindi serials also. Her father is a well-known theatre actor, Tushar Trivedi who has been involved in Gujarati plays for over 20 years. Her younger brother, Karan Trivedi, is also a theatre actor and voice-over artist.

== Early life ==
Trivedi was born and brought up in Mumbai. She graduated in science from the Jai Hind College. During childhood, she and her brother worked as child artistes in TV shows like Zee Horror Show and Humraahi and later on they ventured into the Gujarati theatre. Her father, Tushar Trivedi, is a theatre personality, while her mother is a housewife.

== Career ==
=== Acting ===
Trivedi started acting at a very young age. As a child artist, she has acted in Hindi serials like Hamrahi and Zee Horror Show in small cameo roles. In 1994, she acted in Prakash Jha's telefilm Didi which focused on the education of female children in rural areas. After taking a gap for studies in class 10th and 12th, Trivedi returned to acting as a teenager and did Gujarati theatre for few years.

She got her first break for a small role in a daily soap Babul Ki Duwayen Leti Jaa which aired on Zee TV. Thereafter, she did cameos and supporting roles in few shows like Dil Chahata Hai on Sony SAB as Ragini Mathur and Kumkum – Ek Pyara Sa Bandhan as Vrinda. She also acted in the comedy sitcom Khichdi.

Later in 2005, Trivedi auditioned for Kituu Sabb Jaantii Hai and won the lead role of Kituu. She played the role of a young, extrovert woman who takes the plunge to face the professional world. The show ran for two years and ended in March 2007.

After that, she worked in various other Hindi serials like Zaara, Jaane Kya Baat Hui and Bajega Band Baaja.

In 2010, Trivedi acted in SAB TV's comedy sitcom Papad Pol opposite Swapnil Joshi. She became popular for her role of Kokila in the show for which she was nominated at the Indian Telly Awards in the category for Best Actress in a Comic Role. Papad Pol ended on 13, September 2011.

Trivedi also portrayed the role of Tulika in SAB TV's comedy serial Sajan Re Jhoot Mat Bolo. The show ended on 6 January 2012 after successfully running for 2 years. Trivedi also appeared as a guest in the dance class show Nachle Ve with Saroj Khan hosted by Saroj Khan, on 21 December 2011.

Since 2012, Trivedi kept a distance from television, spending time with her family, until she made a comeback in July 2013 with Zee TV's horror show Fear Files: Darr Ki Sacchi Tasvirein. She did an episodic role in the show. She later entered in Sony TV's popular courtroom drama Adaalat where she played the role of a public prosecutor. She acted as a mother in Tedi Medi Family. She also worked with SAB TV as Rupal (Chakudi) in their TV show Saat Phero Ki Hera Pherie.

=== Dubbing ===
In 2001, Trivedi gave her voice to Daniel Radcliffe's role as Harry Potter in the Hindi-dubbed version of the first film of the Harry Potter Series. Since the second film of the series, her brother, Karan Trivedi took over as the second Hindi dubbing voice for Harry Potter, until it was passed to Rajesh Kava after the fifth film. Since then, she has lent voices in various animated and live-action films like The Incredibles and Barbie Mariposa. She has dubbed for some Gujarati films also.

She's also said that to be the official current Hindi voice for Disney character, Hiro Hamada.

== Personal life ==
Trivedi married her boyfriend, Neeraj Sanghai in 2009. Neeraj Sanghai works at Prime Focus Ltd, a post production services company. They met through a common friend on the sets of Kituu Sab Janti Hai. They were married on 10 December 2009, after four years of dating. At present, they live in a sought-after area of Mumbai, Lokhandwala, Andheri (W). The couple have a son, born on 15 December 2012.

== Gujarati plays ==
Ami has worked in many Gujarati plays. Some of her commercial Gujarati plays are listed below.

Play	Role	Genre	Ref.
Hawe Vasant Thainai Aavo		Drama	
Ek Aakarshan Tejaabi	Isha Chinoy	Drama	
Dikri Vahal No Dariyo	Urja Majumdar	Drama	
Shodh-Pratishodh	Priya	Drama / Comedy	
Carry On Lalu	Sonal Paropkari	Comedy	
Resham Dankh	Foram Soumil	Drama	
Pappa Padhravo Savdhaan		Comedy	
Avtaran	Priya	Drama / Serious	
Life Partner	Sonaki	Drama	
Aankh Micholi	Sumi Bharucha	Comedy	
Ajab Karamat	Shiela	Drama / Comedy	
Mahapurush		Drama	
Hoonj Taro Eeshwar	Roshni	Drama	
Olkhan	Tanvi Patel	Drama	
Kaatil	Vebha	Suspense	

== Filmography ==
=== Films ===
- Dhabkaaro (2026)

=== Television ===
Year	Serial	Role	Notes
1992	Humraahi		Child artist
1994	The Zee Horror Show	Pooja/Nazia	Child artist
2001	Dil Chahata Hai on Sony SAB	Ragini Mathur	
2002–2003	Babul Ki Duwayen Leti Jaa		
2002–2004	Khichdi	Meera Parekh	
2004–2005	Kumkum – Ek Pyara Sa Bandhan	Vrinda	
2005–2007	Kituu Sabb Jaantii Hai	Katyayani "Kittu" Purohit	
2007	Aahat		
2007	Ssshhhh...Phir Koi Hai – Daayan Bani Dulhan	Husna	
2007	Mano Ya Na Mano		
2007	Saas Bahu Aur Saazish	Host	Episode 1
2008	Zaara	Khushi	
2008	Rakhi	Mukti	
2008–2009	Indiadhanush	Herself	Co-host with Siddharth Kak
2008–2009	Jaane Kya Baat Hui	Sanjana Akshay Sareen	
2009–2010	Bajega Band Baaja	Nisha	Female protagonist
2009–2012	Sajan Re Jhoot Mat Bolo	Tulika Shah	
2010–2011	Papad Pol - Shahabuddin Rathod Ki Rangeen Duniya	Kokila Parikh	Nominated– Indian Telly Award for Best Actress in a Comic Role
2011	Nachle Ve with Saroj Khan	Herself	Guest appearance
2013–2015	Adaalat	Advocate Urmi Dikshit	
2013	Fear Files: Darr Ki Sacchi Tasvirein	Juhi	
2014	Pritam Pyare Aur Woh	Jamuna	
2014	Tu Mere Agal Bagal Hai	Khandvi	
2015	Chidiya Ghar	Leelavati	episode 893
2015	Tedi Medi Family	Anjali Khurana	
2018	Saat Phero Ki Hera Pherie	Rupal "Chakuri" Desai	
2021–2023	Yeh Rishta Kya Kehlata Hai	Manjari Birla	
2022	Ravivaar With Star Parivaar	Manjari Birla	Episode 7/8/11/16
2024–2025	United State Of Gujarat	Yamuna	

== Dubbing roles ==
=== Live action films ===
Film title	Actor	Character	Dub language	Original language	Original rear release	Dub year release	Notes
Harry Potter and the Philosopher's Stone	Daniel Radcliffe	Harry Potter	Hindi	English	2001	2002	The Hindi dub released as "Harry Potter and the Sorcerer's Stone"; Released in India on 12 April 2002.
Inception	Marion Cotillard	Mal Cobb (first dub)	Hindi	English	2010	2010	
The Dark Knight Rises	Marion Cotillard	Miranda Tate / Talia al Ghul	Hindi	English	2012	2012	
Hercules	Rebecca Ferguson	Ergenia	Hindi	English	2014	2014	
Superman	Rachel Brosnahan	Lois Lane	Hindi	English	2025	2025	
Ramayana: Part 1	Sai Pallavi	Sita	Hindi	Hindi	2026		Original Hindi Version dubbed

=== Animated films ===
Film title	Original voice(s)	Character(s)	Dub language	Original language	Original rear release	Dub year release	Notes
Barbie of Swan Lake	Kathleen Barr Venus Terzo	Marie Lila	Hindi	English	2003	2004	The Hindi dub released on VCD/DVD. Released on 5 July 2004.
The Incredibles	Sarah Vowell	Violet Parr	Hindi	English	2004	2004	The Hindi dub released as Hum Hain Lajawab.
Chicken Little	Joan Cusack	Abbagail Ducktail Mallard	Hindi	English	2005	2005	
Barbie Mariposa	Chiara Zanni	Mariposa	Hindi	English	2008	2008	

=== Animated series ===
Series title	Original voice	Character	Dub language	Original language	Original year release	Dub year release	Notes
Batman: Caped Crusader	Michelle C. Bonilla	Renee Montoya	Hindi	English	1 August 2024	1 August 2014	Airing on Amazon Prime Video

== Awards ==
- Winner, New Promising Actress Award by Indo-American Society for Kituu Sab Janti Hai in December 2005.
- Winner, Gujarati Actress Award in 2008.
- Nominated, at Indian Telly Awards in the category Best Actor in a Comic Role (Female) in 2010 for Papad Pol.
- Winner, Kala Ratna Award for achieving excellence in her field at Hira Manik Awards Ceremony in 2011.

== See also ==
- List of people from Gujarat
- List of Indian dubbing artists
