= Karan Trivedi =

Indian television and theatre artist

- Born: 17 January 1984 (age 42); Mumbai, Maharashtra, India
- Occupations: Television actor; voice actor; theater artist
- Relatives: Ami Trivedi (sister)

Karan Trivedi (born 17 January 1984) is an Indian television and theatre artist who speaks Hindi and Gujarati. He is the younger brother of actress, Ami Trivedi.

== Filmography ==
=== Films ===
Year	Film title	Role	Language	Notes
2008	Mumbai Meri Jaan	Rich boy in car	Hindi	
2025	Mahavatar Narsimha	Amarka & Sanda	Hindi	Animated film

=== TV ===
Year	title	Role	Language
2011	Taarak Mehta Ka Ooltah Chashmah	Vicky Malhotra	Hindi

== Dubbing career ==
He has been performing Hindi and Gujarati dubbing roles for local Indian and foreign cartoons for over a decade. In the theatrical films genre, he's best known for being the second and longest performing Hindi dub-over voice artist for Daniel Radcliffe's role as Harry Potter, in the Harry Potter films, from the second film until after the fifth film. He obtained the role to Hindi dub Harry Potter, after his sister Ami passed the role to him, after the first film's release in India. Fans consider that the Hindi dubbing role of Harry Potter throughout the second through fifth films, is arguably his best known dubbing role in his career to date.

He has performed the Hindi voice dub-over Harry Potter on four of the Harry Potter films, along with his colleagues, Rajshree Nath (Later replaced by Parignya Pandya in the third film and onwards), Nachiket Dighe, Prasad Barve, Saumya Daan, Rishabh Shukla, Dilip Sinha, Anil Datt, Vikrant Chaturvedi and Ali Khan, who voices Hermione Granger, Ronald Weasley, Draco Malfoy (Prasad for the second movie, with two other actors voicing Draco for the first film and the rest of the series respectively) Fred and George Weasley, Voldemort, Hagrid, Arthur Weasley (Dutt for all films starting with the second), Dumbledore (Dutt for the first 2 films and Chaturvedi from 5th to the final) and Severus Snape respectively, for the Hindi dubs of the film series.

He was considered to be known as: "The voice of Harry Potter".

But after the fifth film, another Hindi voice actor, Rajesh Kava, took over as the third and permanent voice for Harry Potter for the last three films.

He also gave the Hindi dubbing voice to Zac Efron's role as Troy Bolton in the High School Musical film series.

He was also the Hindi dubbing voice of Tobi from Naruto Shippuden.

== Dubbing roles ==
=== Animated series ===
Program title	Original voice(s)	Character(s)	Dub language	Original language	Number of episodes	Original airdate	Dubbed airdate	Notes
Ben 10: Ultimate Alien	Greg Cipes	Kevin Levin	Hindi	English	52	23/4/2010-31/4/2012	10/10/2010-Mid 2012	Aired by Cartoon Network India
Ben 10: Omniverse	Greg Cipes	Kevin Levin	Hindi	English	80	8/1/2012-11/14/2014	26/11/2012-Early 2015	Aired by Cartoon Network India
Ultimate Spider-Man	Chris Cox	Peter Quill / Star-Lord	Hindi	English	104	April 1, 2012 – January 7, 2017		Aired by Disney XD India.
Beyblade: Metal Fusion	Miyu Irino	Tsubasa Otori	Hindi	Japanese	51	4/4/2009- 3/28/2010	11/10/2010 - July 2011	Aired on Cartoon Network India & Dubbed by Sound & Vision India
Beyblade: Metal Masters	Miyu Irino Atsushi Abe Daisuke Shusaku	Tsubasa Otori Zeo Abyss Ian Gracias	Hindi	Japanese	51	4/4/2010- 3/27/2011	22/10/2011 - 7 July 2012	Aired on Cartoon Network India & Dubbed by Sound & Vision India
Beyblade Burst Evolution	Takuma Terashima	Silas Karlisle	Hindi	Japanese	51	3 /4/ 2017 - 26/ 3/ 2018	Late 2019 - Early 2020	Broadcast on Marvel HQ
Marvel Future Avengers	Atsushi Tamaru	Adi / Codec	Hindi	Japanese	26 ( Season 1 ) 13 ( Season 2 )	22/7/2017 – 20/1/ 2018 30/7/2018 - 22/8/2018	Early 2021	Broadcast on Marvel HQ
Transformers Animated	Bumper Robinson	Bumblebee	Hindi	English	45(3 seasons)	2007- 2009	Late 2008	Broadcast on CN and Discovery Kids
Transformers Prime	Will Friedle	Bumblebee	Hindi	English	1(Season 3 episode 13)	2010-2013	2013-2016	Broadcast on Discovery Kids
Transformers Cyberverse	N/A	Bumblebee	Hindi	English				Broadcast on Discovery Kids
Transformers Robots in Disguise	Will Friedle	Bumblebee	Hindi	English	26(Season 1) + some episodes in season 2 and 3	2015-2017	2016-2019	Broadcast on Discovery Kids and CN
Bucchigiri?!	Nozomu Sasaki	Marito	Hindi	Japanese	12	13/1/2024-6/4/2024	NA	Streaming on Crunchyroll

=== Live action television series ===
Title	Actor	Character	Dub language	Original language	Episodes	Original airdate	Dub airdate	Notes
You	Penn Badgley	Joe Goldberg	Hindi	English				
You	Penn Badgley	Joo Hi Han	Hindi	English				
Power Rangers Operation Overdrive	Johnny Yong Bosch	Adam Park/Black Mighty Morphin Ranger	Hindi	English	32(2 dubbed)	February 26 – November 12, 2007	Unknown	

=== Live action films ===
Film title	Actor	Character	Dub language	Original language	Original Year Release	Dub Year Release	Notes
Harry Potter and the Chamber of Secrets	Daniel Radcliffe	Harry Potter	Hindi	English	2002	2003	
Harry Potter and the Prisoner of Azkaban	Daniel Radcliffe	Harry Potter	Hindi	English	2004	2004	
Harry Potter and the Goblet of Fire	Daniel Radcliffe	Harry Potter	Hindi	English	2005	2005	
Harry Potter and the Order of the Phoenix	Daniel Radcliffe	Harry Potter	Hindi	English	2007	2007	
High School Musical	Zac Efron	Troy Bolton	Hindi	English	2006	2007	
High School Musical 2	Zac Efron	Troy Bolton	Hindi	English	2007	2008	
High School Musical 3: Senior Year	Zac Efron	Troy Bolton	Hindi	English	2008	2008	
Tekken	Jon Foo	Jin Kazama	Hindi	English	2010	2010	
The Social Network	Andrew Garfield	Eduardo Saverin	Hindi	English	2010	2010	
Inception	Joseph Gordon-Levitt	Arthur	Hindi	English	2010	2013	
The Green Hornet	Jay Chou	Kato	Hindi	English	2011		
Vanilla Sky	Noah Taylor	Edmund Ventura / Tech Support	Hindi	English	2001	2015	
Fantastic Four	Miles Teller	Reed Richards / Mister Fantastic	Hindi	English	2015	2015	
Elektra	Will Yun Lee	Kirigi	Hindi	English	2005	2005	
Mugamoodi	Jiiva	Anand / Bruce Lee / Mugamoodi	Hindi	Tamil	2012	2012	
Ye Mantram Vesave	Unknown Actor	Unknown Character	Hindi	Telugu	2018	2020	
Twilight	Taylor Lautner	Jacob Black	Hindi	English	2008	2008	
Definitely, Maybe	Ryan Reynolds	William Matthew 'Will' Hayes	Hindi	English	2008	2019	
The Fantastic Four: First Steps	Joseph Quinn	Johnny Storm	Hindi	English	2025	2025	

=== Animated films ===
Film title	Original voice	Character	Dub language	Original language	Original Year Release	Dub Year Release	Notes
Resident Evil: Degeneration	Paul Mercier	Leon S. Kennedy	Hindi	English	2008	2019	

== See also ==
- Ami Trivedi - Karan's older sister, who's also in the acting and voice-artist business.
