= Shammi Narang =

News anchor and entrepreneur

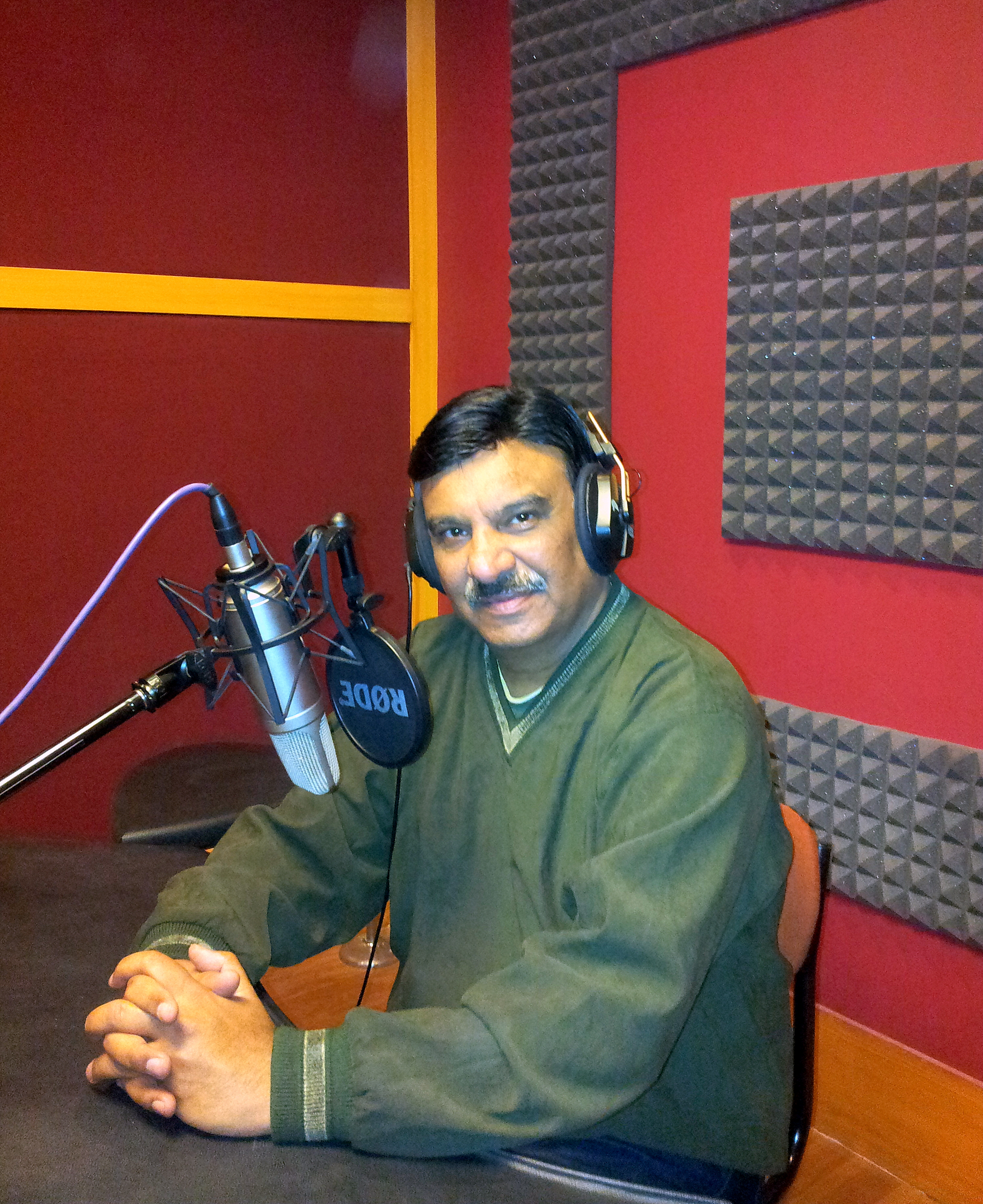
- Born: 25 November 1956 (age 69); Delhi, India
- Known for: News Presenter and Voice of Delhi Metro

Shammi Narang (born 25 November 1956) is an Indian media personality, voice-over artist, ex news anchor and entrepreneur based in Delhi. Graduating with an engineering degree, Narang first got into the voice-over profession by working in the Hindi division of Voice of America. Later he was selected from among 10,000 candidates into Doordarshan, which was then the only channel in India, and became the 'face of Doordarshan news reading' and Indian Television in general during the 1970s – 80s. His rendering of Sarab Sanjhi Gurbani has become the voice of Sikhs globally as well.

After the advent of satellite television, Narang left the channel and instead started training upcoming and budding news anchors, journalists, voice-over artists and emcees.

All Hindi in-train and in-station voice messages and announcements of the Delhi Metro, Rapid Metro Gurgaon, Mumbai Metro, Bangalore Metro, Jaipur Metro and the Hyderabad Metro are recorded in Narang's voice. Narang is also the director of Delhi-based Pindrop Media Group.

== Early life and education ==
Narang's grandfather was a Sikh belonging to the Indian Armed Forces and originally of Lahnda origin. His father served the Indian Army. Narang graduated with an engineering degree from YMCA, Faridabad and was motivated by his father to indulge in hobbies such as stunt riding. He worked as a stunt rider for Escorts. Narang is also a 'semi-trained' singer.

== Personal life ==
Narang is married to Dolly Narang, who hails from Chandigarh. Dolly is a disciple of music composer Jaidev and gives Ghazal performances. The couple have a son and live in South Delhi.

== Pre Doordarshan days ==
Narang made his foray into the voice-over industry with Voice of America. Flanager, a technical director of the United States Information Service (Delhi), spotted Narang in the then-newly built IIT, Delhi campus auditorium and asked Narang to assist him in his sound testing. Flanager saw the potential in Narang's voice, and promptly referred Narang to Shastri, a Hindi scholar, who groomed Narang to take over the Hindi division of Voice of America. After his post graduation, he joined Larsen & Toubro as a marketing professional and was working there for a while. Later, his love for adventure made him join Escorts as a stunt rider, inspired by Rishi Kapoor, a character from the film Bobby. While at it, he had an accident in the late 1980s which is the reason behind his misshapen nose.

== With Doordarshan ==
In 1982, Narang attended the auditions for selection into Doordarshan in a T-shirt and tattered jeans, where he had to compete with around 10,000 aspirants. Devki Nandan Pandey, a veteran news broadcaster, praised his performance. Then started his 20-year association with the channel. Narang developed a style for himself, with his baritone of a voice. With the newscasts of those days having significantly fewer visuals and more of impersonal, restrained vocal illustrations, Narang became 'the face of Doordarshan news reading' with his correctness in pronunciation and diction. People even regarded news readers to be powerful enough to influence the Government for them. Narang recalled once, in an interview, an incident after he had read out a new pension scheme for ex-servicemen, wherein an elderly havaldar had turned up at his door two days later, pleading him to update his pension scheme. Referring to the allegations on the then newscasters of reading out lies in favour of the Government, Narang said that they don't read lies, but just hid the truth.

Doordarshan lost its acclaimed spot after cable and satellite television entered India as it just couldn't stand the competition, with its refusal to adapt to the age of live telecasts. The crews in the competing channels were also comparatively younger, as against the predominantly middle aged Doordarshan crowd. Initially regarded as an expensive novelty, cable television gradually picked up, eventually pushing Doordarshan to become a 'dull-as-ditchwater propaganda machine' of the Government, despite initiatives taken by its professional Directors General. With the trend then demanding the old newsreaders to switch to the roles of news anchors, not many were able to adapt and instead changed their pursuits. Referring to this, Narang said that he would have been a misfit in the current era. On the current scene, Narang observed that it has become 'trivialised' and added that 'the young reporters, fresh out of college, in vogue now would be good in interviewing filmstars but wouldn't be an appropriate choice before Dr Karan Singh or Manmohan Singh.'

== After Doordarshan ==
Narang switched to doing voice-overs and compering shows post Doordarshan. He has done theatre with artists like Sheila Bhatia Narang has been compering the Godfrey Phillips National Bravery Awards ceremony since its inception in 1997. In 1998, Narang founded Studio Pindrop, Delhi's first digital recording studio, which is popular among voice over artists and musicians. He is also a visiting faculty at MADarts, Jaspal Bhatti's film school, and has done voice-overs for its award-winning two-minute animation film, Nanhi Chidiya. He has lent his voice to the audio guides on heritage monuments in Jaipur, Jodhpur, Bikaner and Mysore. He also compered the Guinness record breaking tea party in Indore. Narang was in one of the four two-member teams that undertook a journey from Delhi to Haridwar as part of the TV show, Be Positive, that was on air on Pragya TV, a spiritual lifestyle channel. The Jai Ha! campaign of Bharatiya Janata Party during the 2009 elections used Kaka Hathrasi's satirical jingles sung by Narang. On the potential of the voice-over industry, Narang spoke in an interview that 'voice is the biggest asset of communication' and it can get one a very decent pay even at the starting level. He noted the importance of a good and clear voice. He believes that everyone is capable of voice modulation, though one realises it only in front of a camera or microphone. He recommends a 3-minute recitation session of 'Om' everyday, steaming the throat without gargling, yoga, meditation and avoiding abusive language for a deep and young voice. He is the male voice with a deep baritone that guides the passengers on the do's and don'ts and the Hindi version of the courteous 'Please mind the gap!' announcements inside the Delhi Metro trains everyday and night. He has composed music for a number of ad films, like Tata Tea's Na jaane kya rishta. He was also seen in a couple of films.

In an interview with NDTV on the occasion of Hindi day in 2016, Mr Narang expressed that Hindi learning should not become a burden for the young generation. He suggested that the difficult and rare words that are not in use in our day-to-day life should be replaced by common, simple words.

In 2021, he appeared in an episode of TV Newsance by Newslaundry titled "History of TV News | 75th #IndependenceDay Special TV Newsance Episode 143".

== See also ==
- Dubbing (filmmaking)
- List of Indian Dubbing Artists

== Filmography ==
Year	Title	Language	Role
1986	Uttejna	Hindi	Lead role
2003	Maqbool	Hindi	Mr.Vikas Bhosle
2005	Sahibzade: A Saga of Valour and Sacrifice (2D animation film)	Punjabi	Voice over
2009	Nanhi Chidiya (animated short film)	Hindi	Voice over
2010	No One Killed Jessica	Hindi/English	Justice Jain
2016	Sarbjit	Hindi/English	Guest appearance (as himself)
2016	Sultan	Hindi	Wrestling Commentator
