= Bajega Band Baaja =

- Starring: Swapnil Joshi; Ami Trivedi
- Country of origin: India
- Original language: Hindi
- No. of seasons: 1

Production
- Producers: Hasmukh Shah; Naveeta Kessar
- Running time: 24 minutes

Original release
- Network: DD National
- Release: 2009 – 2010

Bajega Band Baaja is an Indian comedy television series starring Swapnil Joshi and Ami Trivedi. The show aired on DD National from 2009 to 2010.

== Plot ==
A man named Sameer comes from USA to meet his dying father who leaves behind a will saying that Sameer has to marry an Indian girl within 1 year or else he'll lose the entire fortune.

== Cast ==
| Actor | Role |
|---|---|
| Swapnil Joshi | Sameer |
| Ami Trivedi | Nisha |
| Rajesh Jais | Shekhar |
| Kanwaljit Singh | |
| Dinesh Hingoo | |
| Rakhi Verma | Gunjan |
| Shivani Gosain | |
| Rishina Kandhari | Bahaar |
| Pallavi Subhash Chandran | Dilpreet |
