= Indiadhanush =

- Created by: Cinema Vision
- Country of origin: India

Original release
- Network: NDTV Imagine
- Release: 31 March 2008

Indiadhanush is India cultural television show hosted by Siddharth Kak. Indiadhanush premiered on 31 March 2008. Indiadhanush Is Limited To Indian Traveling only.

== Host ==
- Siddharth Kak ... Host
- Ami Trivedi ... Co-host
