= Meghana Erande =

Indian voice actress

- Born: 24 April 1981 (age 45); Mumbai, Maharashtra
- Education: University of Mumbai
- Occupations: Actress; voice actress
- Years active: 1989–present
- Notable credits: Ninja Hattori-kun; Noddy
- Spouse: Vikram Joshi (m. 2010)
- Children: 1

Meghana Erande (or Meghna Sudhir Erande, Mēghanā Sudhīr Ēraṇḍē, Marathi - मेघना सुधीर एरंडे) is an Indian actress and voice actress. She is popularly known for voicing the main character Hattori of Ninja Hattori animated series in Hindi. She has been working in the industry for more than 30 years.

== Dubbing career ==
Meghana first auditioned for Disney's DuckTales series in 1989. She was favoured among 25 artistes to voice for the titular character of Ninja Hattori series in Hindi. She has dubbed Canadian actress Pamela Anderson's role as C. J. Parker in Baywatch, on all the episodes on the seasons she appeared in, and other films since as for some roles in some of the Barbie films and other roles as well, such as Denise Richards's role as Kelly Lanier Van Ryan in Wild Things and Angelina Jolie's role as Police Officer Amelia Donaghy in The Bone Collector, both of which were dubbed in Hindi much later in 2010. She worked on regional national channel on a programme called DAHAVI DIWALI.

She can do voices for children, teenage girls and young women, and she has also dubbed for many Bollywood actresses.

== Dubbing roles ==
=== Animated series ===
Series	Character	Dub Language	Original Language	Episodes	Original Release	Dub Release	Notes
Make Way for Noddy	Noddy	Hindi	English	39	9/2/2002-2008		Aired on Cartoon Network India and Pogo.
Dexter's Laboratory	Dee Dee	Hindi	English	78	4/27/1996-11/20/2003	8/22/1999-2006	Aired on Cartoon Network India.
The Powerpuff Girls	Princess Morbucks	Hindi	English	78 (Dubbed 3)	11/18/1998- 25 March 2005	2000-2005	Dubbed for this character for three episodes throughout her appearances in Seasons 5-6, which includes the Christmas special. Meena Gokuldas previously voiced her in the episodes of the first 4.
Super Robot Monkey Team Hyperforce Go!	Nova	Hindi	English	52	18 September 2004 – 16 December 2006		
Bob the Builder	Dizzy	Hindi	English	199	1998-2003		
Ninja Hattori-kun	Kanzo Hattori	Hindi	Japanese	694	9/28/1981- 25 December 1987		Aired on Nickelodeon India.
Pokémon	Officer Jenny (Junsar) (First Dub)	Hindi	Japanese	1000+	4/1/11997-Ongoing	First dub 5/12/2003-10/2013 (India); 2004-2013 (Pakistan); Second dub 5/19/2014-Current	The First 8 seasons dubbed, were based on the 4Kids Entertainment English dub. The later seasons were also dubbed in Hindi and are also revised translations based on the English dub. A Second Hindi dub has been produced featuring a new Hindi voice cast and translation by UTV Software Communications and aired on Hungama TV. The first dub that Erande was involved in, was produced by Sound & Vision India for Cartoon Network India, Cartoon Network Pakistan and Pogo. Sabina Malik Mausam voiced this character in the second Hindi dub.
Chibi Maruko-chan	Momoko "Maruko" Sakura	Hindi	Japanese	142	1/7/1990- 27 September 1992	Unknown.	Aired on Nickelodeon India.
Perman	Pako / Sumire Hosino / Sumire-chan	Hindi	Japanese	526 (+3 specials)	4/4/1983- 7/2/1987	Unknown.	Aired on Nickelodeon India.
Love, Death & Robots	Greta	Hindi	English	18 (dubbed 1)	15 March 2019 – present		Episode: "Beyond the Aquila Rift"
Doraemon	Dorami / Doraemon	Hindi	Japanese		15 April 2005 – present	20 November 2020 – present / 1 March 2021 – present	Aired on Disney Channel
Little Krishna	Baby Krishna	Hindi	Hindi	13	2009		

=== Animated films ===
Films	Character(s)	Dub Language	Original Language	Original Release	Dub Release	Notes
Barbie as Rapunzel	Princess Melody	Hindi	English	2002	2004	Her name was mentioned in the Hindi dubbing credits that were shown after the original ending credits.
Barbie as the Island Princess	Tallulah; Rita	Hindi	English	2007	2007	Her name was mentioned in the Hindi dubbing credits that were shown after the original ending credits. For Tallulah, only her dialogue was dubbed into Hindi. The Hindi singing voice for Tallulah was performed by Sunayana S. Dasgupta, who also serves as the director of the Hindi dubbed songs.
Ghatothkach	Baby Ghatothkach "Ghattu", Kid Gajju, Animal voices	Hindi, Marathi	Hindi	2008		
The Little Mermaid II: Return to the Sea	Princess Melody (Speaking)	Hindi	English	2000	2011	The singing voice was provided by Amrita Beni
Big Hero 6	Abigail Callaghan	Hindi	English	2014	2017	
Despicable Me 3	Lucy Wilde	Hindi	English	2017	2017	An Unknown Voice-Actress dubbed this character in previous movie.
Olaf's Frozen Adventure	Elsa (Speaking)	Hindi	English	2017	2017	Meghana voiced speaking parts of Elsa in the Hindi dubbing of Olaf's Frozen Adventure, Singing voice is provided by Tarannum Malik, This movie's Hindi dub was shown in cinemas on 24 November 2017 free with Pixar's Coco, And It aired on 30 December 2017 on Disney Channel. And This movie is available in CDs from 8 January 2018. She was credited with her nickname Meghana Joshi in Cinemas End Credits.
Batman Beyond: Return of the Joker	Delia and Deidre Dennis / Dee Dee	Hindi	English	2000		

=== Live-action TV series ===
Series	Actress	Character	Dub Language	Original Language	Episodes	Original Release	Dub Release	Notes
Baywatch	Pamela Anderson	C. J. Parker	Hindi	English	242 (Dubbed 109)	22 September 1989 - 14 May 2001	Unknown.	Meghana has dubbed this character throughout all episodes she appeared in, when it was later dubbed into Hindi.
Teletubbies	Pui Fan Lee	Po	Hindi	English	365	1997-2001		
Drake & Josh	Miranda Cosgrove; Various Actresses	Megan Parker; Various Characters	Hindii1	English	56	11 January 2004 – 16 September 2007		Performed along with Brian D'Costa as Drake Parker (Drake Bell), Prasad Barve as Josh Nicols (Josh Peck), Meena Nahta as Audrey (Nancy Sullivan) and Vinod Sharma as Walter Nicols (Jonathan Goldstein)
Power Rangers Ninja Storm	Sally Martin	Tori Hanson	Hindi	English	38	2003	Unknown	Voiced Ninja Storm Blue Ranger for 42 episodes
Power Rangers Dino Thunder	Sally Martin	Tori Hanson	Hindi	English	38(dubbed 2)	2004	Unknown	
Power Rangers Operation Overdrive	Sally Martin	Tori Hanson	Hindi	English	32(dubbed 2)	2007	Unknown	
Stranger Things	Winona Ryder	Joyce Byers	Hindi	English	34	2016-Present	Unknown.	Meghana has dubbed this character throughout all episodes she appeared in, when it was later dubbed into Hindi.
The Trial	Kajol	Noyonika Sengupta	Marathi	Hindi	8	2023		

=== Live action films ===
Film	Actress	Character	Dub Language	Original Language	Original Release	Dub Release	Notes
Tom, Dick, and Harry	Kim Sharma	Bijli	Hindi	Hindi	2006	2006	Meghana was called in to dub the dialogues during post-production because Kim was not good in giving a particular Marathi accent, thus ending up speaking in a typical Machchiwali style. Dissatisfied by the director, Meghana was then contacted to dub for Kim to make her accent sound better, even though this film was already shot in Hindi.
Wild Things	Denise Richards	Kelly Lanier Van Ryan	Hindi	English	1998	2010	This Hindi Dub that Meghana participated in, has been produced in 2010 and aired on TV.
The Bone Collector	Angelina Jolie	Police Officer Amelia Donaghy	Hindi	English	1999	2010	This Hindi Dub that Meghana participated in, has been produced in 2010 and aired on TV.
Harry Potter and the Goblet of Fire	Shirley Henderson	Moaning Myrtle	Hindi	English	2005	2005	She only voiced this character in this film only. In Harry Potter and the Chamber of Secrets where she originally made her first appearance, she was dubbed by another Hindi voice actress.
Zathura: A Space Adventure	Kristen Stewart	Lisa Budwing	Hindi	English	2005	2006	
The Mummy: Tomb of the Dragon Emperor	Isabella Leong	Lin	Hindi	English; Mandarin Chinese; Sanskrit	2008	2008	
The Prestige	Scarlett Johansson	Olivia Wenscombe	Hindi	English	2006	2006	
Daredevil	Jennifer Garner	Elektra Natchios	Hindi	English	2003	2003	
Kick-Ass 2	Chloë Grace Moretz	Mindy Macready / Hit-Girl	Hindi	English	2013	2013	
Lingaa	Anushka Shetty	Lakshmi	Hindi	Tamil	2014	2014	
Lucy	Scarlett Johansson	Lucy	Hindi	English	2014	2014	Hindi dub only created for the Home media release.
Knocked Up	Katherine Heigl	Alison Scott	Hindi	English	2007	2007	
Shooter	Kate Mara	Sara Fenn	Hindi	English	2007	2007	
Charlie and the Chocolate Factory	AnnaSophia Robb	Violet Beauregarde	Hindi	English	2005	2005	
Beauty and the Beast	Gugu Mbatha-Raw	Plumette	Hindi	English	2017	2017	
Speed Racer	Christina Ricci	Trixie	Hindi	English	2008	2008	
Speed Racer	Ariel Winter	Young Trixie	Hindi	English	2008	2008	
The Firm	Jeanne Tripplehorn	Abigail "Abby" McDeere	Hindi	English	1993		
Leap Year	Amy Adams	Anna Brady	Hindi	English	2010	2010	
Tanhaji	Kajol	Savitri Bai	Marathi	Hindi	2020		
Tribhanga	Kajol	Anuradha "Anu" Apte	Marathi	Hindi	2020		

=== TV Commercials ===
Year	Title	Brand	Actress	Dub Language	Original language	Notes	Ref.
2023	INA Diamond Collection	PNG Jewellers	Madhuri Dixit	Marathi	Hindi		

== Filmography ==
=== Television ===
Year	Program	Role	Note
1993-1997	Tara	young Tara	
2022	Maharashtrachi Hasyajatra	Guest performer	Episode 275
2026-present	Sanai Chaughade	Pramila Parab (Pama)	Female lead's mother

== Awards ==
Year	Award	Category	Work	Result	Notes	Ref.
2020	India Voice Fest Awards	Dubbing Live Action - Marathi		Won		
2020	India Voice Fest Awards	Audio Book Female - Hindi		Won		
2022	India Voice Fest Awards	Dubbing Voice Animation Series - Hindi		Won		

== See also ==
- Dubbing
- List of Indian dubbing artists
