= Neshma Chemburkar =

Indian voice actress (born 1976)

- Born: 14 July 1976 (age 49); India
- Other name: Neshma Mantri
- Occupations: Voice Actress; Actress
- Years active: 1980–present
- Known for: Black Widow

Neshma Chemburkar is an Indian voice actress and Actor. She began her dubbing career at the age of 5. She has dubbed for various characters in many animated series, TV commercials, and films in Hindi and Marathi. She is mostly known for dubbing the Black Widow character played by Scarlett Johansson in the Marvel Cinematic Universe. She is the founder and also a voice acting coach of Neshma Academy of Acting and Voice Acting (NAAVA).

== Career ==
Neshma's father, Sri Nitin Mantri and mother, Sulbha Mantri owned a theatre called Neshma Theatre Group in Mumbai in 1970s, where they used to write, direct and perform plays in Marathi language. She was given her name from the theatre's title. At the age of 4 years, her career as a voice artist began from the 1981 Marathi film, Daivat.

She appeared as a child actor in 1987 Hindi film, Honhaar Bachchey, along with Mayur Vyas which marked her first film as an actress.

== Dubbing roles ==
=== Animated series ===
Year (Original release)	Series	Character	Dub Language	Original language	Episodes	No. of seasons	Notes	Ref.
1969–1970	Scooby-Doo	Velma	Hindi	English	41	3		
1981–1987	Ninja Hattori	Kenichi's mother	Hindi	Japanese	694			
1983–1985	Perman	Michiko	Hindi	Japanese	526			
1986–1989	Dragon Ball	Chi-Chi and Pan	Hindi	Japanese	153			
1989–1996	Dragon Ball Z	Chi-Chi and Pan	Hindi	Japanese	291			
1997–1999	Pokemon	May	Hindi	Japanese	82	1		
1998–2005	The Powerpuff Girls	Blossom	Hindi	English	78	6		
1999–2009	Ed, Edd n Eddy	Sarah	Hindi	English	69	6		
1999–2009	Ed, Edd n Eddy	Nazz	Hindi	English	69	6		
2004–2023	Peppa Pig	Mummy Pig	Hindi	English	394	8		
2004–2023	Peppa Pig	Danny Dog	Hindi	English	394	8		
2004–2023	Peppa Pig	Emily Elephant	Hindi	English	394	8		
2002–2007	Kim Possible	Kim Possible	Hindi	English	87	4		
2018	Little Singham	Inspector Kavya	Hindi	Hindi				
2018	Little Singham	Ulti	Hindi	Hindi				
2021–2024	The Ghost and Molly McGee	Molly McGee	Hindi	English	41	2		

=== Animated films ===
Year	Films	Character	Dub Language	Original language	Notes	Ref.
2008	Ghatothkach	Adult Surekha	Hindi	Hindi		
2012	Brave	Merida	Hindi	English		
2016	Zootopia	Judy Hopps	Hindi	English		
2022	Dragon Ball Super: Super Hero	Pan	Hindi	Japanese		
2024	Transformers One	Elita-1	Hindi	English		

=== Live-action films ===
Year	Films	Character	Actress	Dub Language	Original language	Notes	Ref.
1992	Jivalagaa	Gauri	Resham Tipnis	Marathi	Marathi		
2025	Kaantha	Kumari	Bhagyashri Borse	Hindi	Tamil		
2000	Charlie's Angels	Alex Munday	Lucy Liu	Hindi	English		
2003	Charlie's Angels: Full Throttle	Alex Munday	Lucy Liu	Hindi	English		
2010	Iron Man 2	Black Widow	Scarlett Johansson	Hindi	English		
2012	The Avengers	Black Widow	Scarlett Johansson	Hindi	English		
2014	Captain America: The Winter Soldier	Black Widow	Scarlett Johansson	Hindi	English		
2015	Avengers: Age of Ultron	Black Widow	Scarlett Johansson	Hindi	English		
2016	Captain America: Civil War	Black Widow	Scarlett Johansson	Hindi	English		
2018	Avengers: Infinity War	Black Widow	Scarlett Johansson	Hindi	English		
2019	Avengers: Endgame	Black Widow	Scarlett Johansson	Hindi	English		
2019	Jojo Rabbit	Rosie Betzler	Scarlett Johansson	Hindi	English		
2019	Charlie's Angels	Rebekah "Bosley"	Elizabeth Banks	Hindi	English		
2021	Black Widow	Black Widow	Scarlett Johansson	Hindi	English		
2005	Batman Begins	Rachel Dawes	Katie Holmes	Hindi	English		
2025	The Calendar Killer	Klara	Luise Heyer	Hindi	German		
2025	Back in Action	Emily	Cameron Diaz	Hindi	English		
1994	The Mask	Tina Carlyle	Cameron Diaz	Hindi	English	Aired by UTV Action.	
2005	Catwoman	Patience Phillips / Catwoman	Halle Berry	Hindi	English		

=== Live-action TV series ===
Year	Series	Character	Actress	Dub Language	Original language	Notes	Ref.
2018	The Haunting of Hill House	Eleanor "Nell" Crain Vance	Victoria Pedretti	Hindi	English		
2019	What/If	Lisa Ruiz-Donovan	Jane Levy	Hindi	English		
2025	Missing You	Detective Inspector Kat Donovan	Rosalind Eleazar	Hindi	English		

== Filmography ==
Year	Film	Role	Notes	Ref.
1987	Honhaar Bachchey	Milu	credited as Baby Neshma	

== Awards ==
Year	Award	Category	Work	Result	Notes	Ref.
2019	India Voice Fest Awards	Dubbing Live Action Film – Hindi	Black Widow in Avengers: Endgame	Won		
2019	India Voice Fest Awards	Dubbing Live Action Web – Hindi	Lisa Ruiz-Donovan in What/If	Won		
2020	India Voice Fest Awards	Audio Book Female – Marathi	Youthnasia	Won		
2021	India Voice Fest Awards	TV Commercial Voice – Marathi	Madhuri Dixit in Aquaguard Active Copper	Won		
2022	India Voice Fest Awards	Documentary Narration – Hindi	Secrets of Playboy	Won		
2022	India Voice Fest Awards	Dubbing Live Action Film – Hindi	The Matrix Resurrections	Won		
2023	India Voice Fest Awards	Dubbing Voice Animation Show Female – Hindi	The Ghost and Molly McGee	Won		
2024	50th RAPA Awards	Best Dubbing Artist	Subbalakshmi in Colgate Strong Teeth	Won		

== See also ==
- List of Indian dubbing artists
