= Manish Kaushik (voice actor) =

Indian voice-dubbing artist, radio personality, and entertainer

- मनीष कौशिक
- Occupations: Voice actor; radio jockey; entertainer

Manish Kaushik (Hindi: मनीष कौशिक Manīṣa Kauśika) is an Indian voice-dubbing artist, radio jockey and entertainer that can speak English, Hindi and Haryanvi as his mother tongue languages.

He has given the Hindi dubbing voice to Brandon in Season 4 of the Italian animated series, Winx Club.

== Dubbing career ==
Kaushik has been dubbing for characters that are known to have light-hearted wise personalities. Usually Cheerful, rich, comedic, bright and upbeat characters. His voice tone ranges from Mid-range to deep. His voice is usually best suited for those with happy cheerful positive nature and authoritative attitudes. He actively does voiceover work for National Geographic Channel, National Geographic Wild, NDTV Good Times, UTV movies, TV commercials, Promotional Videos and many more.

== Dubbing roles ==
=== Animated series ===
Program title	Original voice	Character	Dub language	Original language	Number of episodes	Original airdate	Dubbed airdate	Notes
Winx Club	Massimiliano Alto	Brandon	Hindi	Italian	113	1/28/2004–present		Aired on Cartoon Network India and Pogo dubbed in Hindi.

=== Live action films ===
Film title	Actor	Character	Dub language	Original language	Original Year Release	Dub Year Release	Notes
RoboCop	Jay Baruchel	Tom Pope	Hindi	English	2014	2014	

== See also ==
- Dubbing (filmmaking)
- List of Indian Dubbing Artists
