= Atul Kapoor =

Indian actor

- Other name: Atul Kapur
- Occupations: Actor, Voice actor
- Years active: 2002–present

Atul Kapoor (born 28 December 1966 in Mumbai) is an Indian actor and voice actor who can speak English, Punjabi and Hindi.

He mostly has worked with dubbing foreign content into the Hindi language as part of his voice-acting career. He started off in 2002 before he made a big breakthrough in his career by voicing Bigg Boss on Sony Entertainment Television in 2006 and on Colors from 2008.

== Filmography ==
=== Live action television series ===
Airdate	Program series	Character role(s)	Number of episodes	Language	Channel	Notes
2006-present	Bigg Boss	Bigg Boss (voice)	1864+	Hindi	Sony Entertainment Television	
2006-present	Bigg Boss	Bigg Boss (voice)	1864+	Hindi	Colors Tv	
2021- present	Bigg Boss OTT	Bigg Boss (voice)	144	Hindi	Voot (Season 1); JioCinema (Season 2 - Present )	

== Dubbing roles ==
=== Live action television series ===
Title	Actor	Character	Dub language	Original language	Number of episodes	Original airdate	Dubbed airdate	Notes
Cosmos: A Spacetime Odyssey	Neil deGrasse Tyson	Himself / Host	Hindi	English	13	2014	2014	
Vincenzo	Yoo Tae-woong	Kim Seok-woo	Hindi	Korean	4 (Episodes 17-20)	2021	2021	Aired on Netflix
Loki	Paul Bettany	Vision	Hindi	English	1 (Episode 6)	2021	2021	The original featured an archival voice from WandaVision but since WandaVision was not dubbed in Hindi, a dialogue was separately recorded for this episode.

=== Live action films ===
Title	Actor	Character	Dub language	Original language	Original year release	Dub year release	Notes
Spider-Man 3	Hal Fishman	Anchorman	Hindi	English	2007	2007	The Hindi dub was titled: Spider-Man 3: Kashmakash.
Iron Man	Paul Bettany	J.A.R.V.I.S. (voice)	Hindi	English	2008	2008	
Iron Man 2	Paul Bettany	J.A.R.V.I.S. (voice)	Hindi	English	2010	2010	
Iron Man 3	Paul Bettany	J.A.R.V.I.S. (voice)	Hindi	English	2013	2013	The Hindi dub was titled: Iron Man 3: Faulaadi Rakshak.
The Avengers	Paul Bettany	J.A.R.V.I.S. (voice)	Hindi	English	2012	2012	The Hindi dub was titled: Avengers: Angaarey Bane Sholey.
Avengers: Age of Ultron	Paul Bettany	J.A.R.V.I.S. (voice) Vision	Hindi	English	2015	2015	The Hindi dub was titled: Avengers: Kalyug Ka Mahayudh.
Captain America: Civil War	Paul Bettany	Vision	Hindi	English	2016	2016	
Avengers: Infinity War	Paul Bettany	Vision	Hindi	English	2018	2018	
Avengers: Endgame	James D'Arcy	Edwin Jarvis	Hindi	English	2019	2019	
The Fantastic Four: First Steps	Ralph Ineson	Galactus	Hindi	English	2025	2025	
Vivegam	Narrator		Hindi	Tamil	2017	2018	Atul gave his voice for the narration in the Hindi version despite the absence of a narrator in the original Tamil version

=== Animated films ===
Title	Original voice	Character	Dub language	Original language	Original year release	Dub year release	Notes
Toy Story 3	Teddy Newton	Chatter Telephone	Hindi	English	2010	2010	

== See also ==
- List of Indian dubbing artists
