= Jambuka =

Jambuka (6th century BC) is an ascetic described in the 70th verse of the Dhammapada, a Buddhist text.

Jambuka was the son of a wealthy man in Savatthi, who was born with peculiar habits due to negative karma accrued from past lives. In his childhood, he showed a desire to sleep on the floor rather than in a bed, and instead of consuming rice, he preferred to consume his own excrement. After he had grown older, his parents sent him to train with the ajivakas, the naked ascetics. However, upon discovering his penchant for consuming excrement, the ascetics then expelled him. He consumed excrement by night and by day, standing still on one leg with his mouth open. He claimed that he kept his mouth open as he lived on air and that he stood on one leg so that it would not be too heavy for the earth to bear him. He would boast "I never sit down, I never go to sleep", earning the name Jambuka, meaning a jackal.

Jambuka would refuse the offerings of food given to him, claiming that he would not consume anything but air, or he would only partake a small amount with a tip of a blade of grass, claiming that the offerings had brought merit to the offerer. He did so for fifty-five years, living naked and consuming excrement.

The Buddha came to the area in which Jambuka was staying and spent the night in a mountain cave near the abode of Jambuka. During the night, the devas Sakka and Mahabrahma paid homage to the Buddha and the forest lit up, catching the attention of Jambuka. Jambuka later praised the Buddha for gaining the homage of the devas, noting that he himself had not received any such homage in his 55 years of austere practice. The Buddha told him that he was aware that Jambuka had been deceiving people by actually sleeping on the ground and eating excrement.

Jambuka was horrified to learn that he had been exposed, and he took refuge in the Buddha and joined the Sangha. He eventually became an arahant. His disciples from Magadha also later joined the Sangha. The Buddha stated that although Jambuka had been austere in his former practices, it was not worth one-sixteenth of his new practices.
