= Mayur Vyas =

Indian voice actor

- Born: Mumbai, India
- Occupations: College lecturer; Voice actor
- Years active: 2001–present

Mayur Vyas (Mayūra Vyāsa) is an Indian voice actor who does dubbing into Hindi for films and television programs. He has done voice over work for numerous characters from American, Tamil and Telugu films and television shows that are dubbed in Hindi. He has also appeared as child actor in 1987 Hindi film, Honhaar Bachchey, with voice actress Neshma Chemburkar.

== Personal life ==
Vyas is a teacher of Management Studies at the Usha Pravin Gandhi College of Management, Mumbai.

== Dubbing career ==
Mayur Vyas has been dubbing Indian and foreign films, TV programs and cartoons into the Hindi language since 2001. His most notable work includes dubbing Rajinikanth's voice from Tamil into Hindi in the films Sivaji, Robot, Lingaa, Kabali, Kaala, 2.0, Darbar, Annaatthe, Jailer, Vettaiyan & Coolie. Vyas first dubbed for Rajinikanth for Sivaji in 2007. He got the part through Swanand Kirkire who was handling the Hindi screenplay and dubbing for the film.

Vyas has dubbed for Hollywood actors Brad Pitt, Tom Hanks, Hugh Jackman, Robert Downey Jr., Seth MacFarlane and Ben Stiller.

== Dubbing roles ==
=== Live action series ===
Program title	Actor	Character	Dub language	Original language	Episodes	Original airdate	Dubbed airdate	Notes
House of Cards	Boris McGiver	Tom Hammerschmidt	Hindi	English		2013 – present		
Drake & Josh	Various Actors	Various Characters	Hindi	English	56	11 January 2004 – 16 September 2007		
Into the Wild	Bear Grylls	Various Characters	Hindi	English	56	March 2020		
Navarasa	Vijay Sethupathi	Dheena	Hindi	Tamil	9	6 August 2021		
Kota Factory	Sameer Saxena	Mr. Maheshwari	English	Hindi	5	24 September 2021		
Money Heist	Rodrigo de la Serna	Palermo	Hindi	Spanish	10	19 July 2019		

=== Animated series ===
Program title	Original voice	Character	Dub language	Original language	Number of episodes	Original airdate	Dubbed airdate	Notes
Johnny Test	Ian James Corlett	Hugh Test	Hindi	English	130	9/17/2005-Current	Unknown	
Ben 10: Alien Force	David McCallum	Professor Paradox	Hindi	English	46	4/18/2008- 3/26/2010	11/12/2009- Early 2010	
Ben 10: Ultimate Alien	David McCallum	Professor Paradox	Hindi	English	52	4/10/2010-31/4/2012	10/10/2010 - Mid 2012	
Dragon Ball Z	Mayumi Tanaka	Krillin	Hindi	Japanese	291	4/26/1989-1/31/1996		
Dragon Ball Z Kai	Mayumi Tanaka	Krillin	Hindi	Japanese	167	5/4/2009-6/28/2015	4/16/2023-11/12/2023	
Dragon Ball Super	Mayumi Tanaka	Krillin	Hindi	Japanese	131	7/5/2015-3/28/2018	5/22/2022-11/6/2022	
Beyblade	Urara Takano (JP); David Reale (EN)	Kai Hiwatari	Hindi	Japanese	51	1/8/2001- 12/24/2001	6/3/2005-2006	
Beyblade V-Force	Urara Takano (JP); David Reale (EN)	Kai Hiwatari	Hindi	Japanese	51	7/1/2002-30/12/2002	2006–2007	
Beyblade G-Revolution	Urara Takano (JP); David Reale (EN)	Kai Hiwatari	Hindi	Japanese	52	6/1/2003- 29/12/2003	2007–2008	
Beyblade: Metal Masters	Romi Park Koki Uchiyama Koki Miyata Mitsuo Iwata Masaki Terasoma	Damain Hart Jack Toby Brazilian Blader DJ Coach Steel	Hindi	Japanese	51	4/4/2010- 3/27/2011	22/10/2011- 7 July 2012	
Love, Death & Robots	Gary Cole	The Inspector	Hindi	English	18 (dubbed 1)	March 15, 2019 – present		Episode: "The Dump"
Justice League Unlimited	Kin Shriner and various actors	Green Arrow and various characters	Hindi	English	39	July 31, 2004 - May 13, 2006		

=== Live action films ===
==== Indian films ====
Film title	Actor	Character	Dub language	Original language	Original year release	Dub year release	Notes
Ready	Brahmanandam	McDowell Murthy	Hindi	Telugu	2008	2023	
Rustum	Shiva Rajkumar	ACP Abhishek Bhargava	Hindi	Kannada	2019	2020	
Mukunda Murari	Upendra Rao	Mukunda	Hindi	Kannada	2016	2022	The Hindi dub was titled: Insaniyat Ki Taaqat.
Selva	Joseph Vijay Chandrasekhar	Selva (Silva in Hindi version)	Hindi	Tamil	1996	Unknown	The Hindi dub was titled: Officer.
Gabbar Is Back	Suman Talwar	Digvijay Patil	Hindi	Hindi	2015		
Yamadonga	N. T. Rama Rao Jr.	Raja	Hindi	Telugu	2007	2008	The Hindi dub was titled: Lok Parlok.
Sivaji: The Boss	Rajinikanth	Sivaji Arumugam	Hindi	Tamil	2007	2010	
Victory	Shashank	Ravi Kumar	Hindi	Telugu	2008	2010	The Hindi-dub was titled: Kabzaa: The Mafia Raaj.
Victory	Krishna Bhagavaan	MRO Divadheenam (Devachalan in Hindi version)	Hindi	Telugu	2008	2010	The Hindi-dub was titled: Kabzaa: The Mafia Raaj.
Enthiran	Rajinikanth	Dr. Vaseegaran and Chitti	Hindi	Tamil	2010	2010	The Hindi dub was titled: Robot.
Ayan	Prabhu	Arumuga Dass	Hindi	Tamil	2009	2011	The Hindi dub was titled: Vidhwanshak: The Destroyer.
Athadu	Dharmavarapu Subramanyam †	Puri's Uncle	Hindi	Telugu	2005	2013	The Hindi dub was titled: Cheetah: The Power of One.
Dhee	Tanikella Bharani	Corporator Krishna	Hindi	Telugu	2007	2013	The Hindi dub was titled: Sabse Badi Hera Pheri.
Julayi	Rajendra Prasad	ACP Seetharam	Hindi	Telugu	2012	2013	The Hindi and Hindustani dubs both were titled: Dangerous Khiladi. Mayur also dubbed the intro lines of the film.
Julayi	Rajendra Prasad	ACP Seetharam	Hindustani	Telugu	2012	2021	The Hindi and Hindustani dubs both were titled: Dangerous Khiladi. Mayur also dubbed the intro lines of the film.
Julayi	Posani Krishna Murali	Club Owner	Hindustani	Telugu	2012	2021	The Hindi and Hindustani dubs both were titled: Dangerous Khiladi. Mayur also dubbed the intro lines of the film.
Chirutha	Dharmavarapu Subramanyam †	Subramaniam	Hindi	Telugu	2007	2013	
Daruvu	Avinash	Shantaram	Hindi	Telugu	2012	2013	The Hindi dub was titled: Jeene Nahi Doonga.
Nippu	Rajendra Prasad	Narayana Murthy	Hindi	Telugu	2012	2013	The Hindi dub was titled: Main Insaaf Karoonga.
Darling	Dharmavarapu Subramanyam †	Buchchaiah Mama / Booch Thomas (Flashback)	Hindi	Telugu	2010	2013	The Hindi dub was titled: Sabse Badhkar Hum.
Lingaa	Rajinikanth	Lingaa/Raja Lingeshwaran	Hindi	Tamil	2014	2014	
Power	Prudhviraj	Cabinet Minister	Hindi	Telugu	2014	2014	The Hindi dub was titled: Power Unlimited.
Power	Ajay	Kundan	Hindi	Telugu	2014	2014	The Hindi dub was titled: Power Unlimited.
Iddarammayilatho	Rao Ramesh	Akanksha's father	Hindi	Telugu	2013	2014	The Hindi dub was titled: Dangerous Khiladi 2.
Krishnam Vande Jagadgurum	Posani Krishna Murali	Tippu Sultan	Hindi	Telugu	2012	2014	The Hindi dub was titled: Krishna Ka Badla.
Racha	Ravi Babu	Chaitra's bodyguard	Hindi	Telugu	2012	2014	The Hindi dub was titled: Betting Raja.
Muni 2: Kanchana	Babu Antony	Bhai	Hindi	Tamil	2011	2014	The Hindi dub was titled: Kanchana.
Vettaikaaran	Cochin Haneefa †	Complex owner	Hindi	Tamil	2009	2014	The Hindi dub was titled: Dangerous Khiladi 3.
Dongodu	Dharmavarapu Subramanyam †	Unknown	Hindi	Telugu	2003	2014	The Hindi dub was titled: Chalu No. 1.
Chandee	Narrator	Narrator	Hindi	Telugu	2013	2015	The Hindi-dub was titled: Chandi: The Power Of Woman.
Chandee	R. Sarathkumar	Chandrasekhar Azad	Hindi	Telugu	2013	2015	The Hindi-dub was titled: Chandi: The Power Of Woman.
Uu Kodathara? Ulikki Padathara?	Dharmavarapu Subramanyam †	Utsava Murthy	Hindi	Telugu	2012	2015	The Hindi dub was titled: Simha 2.
Thirumalai	Avinash	Ashok (Swetha's father)	Hindi	Tamil	2003	2015	The Hindi dub was titled: Dum 2.
Denikaina Ready	Dharmavarapu Subramanyam †	Malinga Sastry	Hindi	Telugu	2012	2015	The Hindi dub was titled: Sabse Badi Hera Pheri 2.
Loukyam	Posani Krishna Murali	Guptaji	Hindi	Telugu	2014	2015	The Hindi dub was titled: Ek Khiladi.
Loukyam	Krishna Bhagavaan	Nano Sastry	Hindi	Telugu	2014	2015	The Hindi dub was titled: Ek Khiladi.
Cameraman Gangatho Rambabu	Dharmavarapu Subramanyam †	MD	Hindi	Telugu	2012	2015	The Hindi dub was titled: Mera Target.
Cameraman Gangatho Rambabu	Mukhtar Khan	Police Commissioner	Hindi	Telugu	2012	2015	The Hindi dub was titled: Mera Target.
Saamy	Ramesh Khanna	Inspector Paramasivam (Paramanand in Hindi version)	Hindi	Tamil	2003	2016	The Hindi dub was titled: Policewala Gunda 3.
Son of Satyamurthy	Rajendra Prasad	Paida Sambasiva Rao (Mohan Kumar Mishra in Hindi version)	Hindi	Telugu	2015	2016	
Heart Attack	Devan	Inspector Madhusudhan	Hindi	Telugu	2014	2016	
Kabali	Rajinikanth	Kabaleeswaran (Kabali)	Hindi	Tamil	2016	2016	
Yennai Arindhaal	Suman Talwar	Muruganandham	Hindi	Tamil	2015	2016	The Hindi dub was titled: Satyadev - The Fearless Cop.
Temper	Posani Krishna Murali	Narayana Murthy	Hindi	Telugu	2015	2016	
Nenu Sailaja	Naresh	Hari's father	Hindi	Telugu	2016	2016	The Hindi dub was titled: The Super Khiladi 3.
Endukante... Premanta!	Nagineedu	Pulla Reddy (Gabbar Singh in Hindi version)	Hindi	Telugu	2012	2016	The Hindi dub was titled: Dangerous Khiladi 5.
Endukante... Premanta!	Dharmavarapu Subramanyam †	Unknown	Hindi	Telugu	2012	2016	The Hindi dub was titled: Dangerous Khiladi 5.
Govindudu Andarivadele	Posani Krishna Murali	lawyer engaged by Balaraju's brother	Hindi	Telugu	2014	2016	The Hindi dub was titled: Yevadu 2.
Anjaan	Narrator	Narrator	Hindi	Tamil	2014	2016	The Hindi dub was titled: Khatarnak Khiladi 2. Mayur narrated in the Hindi dub released with a different sequence and dubbed some of the characters.
Jil	Posani Krishna Murali	Narayana	Hindi	Telugu	2015	2016	
Kick 2	Ravi Kishan (voice in original version dubbed by P. Ravi Shankar)	Solomon Singh Thakur	Hindi	Telugu	2015	2016	The Hindi dub was titled: Jigarwala No. 1.
Maari	Kaali Venkat	Aarumugam (Arnold in Hindi version)	Hindi	Tamil	2015	2016	The Hindi dub was titled: Rowdy Hero.
Vedalam	Nagineedu	Tamizh (Trisha in Hindi version)'s Doctor	Hindi	Tamil	2015	2016	
Vedalam	Mukhtar Khan	Police Commissioner Yashpal	Hindi	Tamil	2015	2016	
Pedarayudu	Rajinikanth (voice in original version dubbed by P. Sai Kumar)	Paparayudu (Dada Thakur in Hindi version)	Hindi	Telugu	1995	2016	The Hindi dub was titled: Betaaz Badshah.
Paayum Puli	Anandaraj	Inspector Manikandan	Hindi	Tamil	2015	2016	The Hindi dub was titled: Main Hoon Rakshak.
Akhil: The Power of Jua	Rajendra Prasad	K.V. Rajendra Prasad	Hindi	Telugu	2015	2017	
Terror	Unknown actor	Murthy	Hindi	Telugu	2016	2017	
Jaggu Dada	Achyuth Kumar	Uday Naik	Hindi	Kannada	2016	2017	The Hindi dub was titled: Khatarnak Khiladi 3.
Theri	Kaali Venkat	Ganesan (Ganesh in Hindi version)	Hindi	Tamil	2016	2017	
Theri	Swaminathan	Vijayakumar's prospective bride's father	Hindi	Tamil	2016	2017	
Theri	Kumar Natarajan	Mithra (Smita in Hindi version)'s father	Hindi	Tamil	2016	2017	
Bairavaa	Aadukalam Naren	Malarvizhi (Maheshwari in Hindi version)'s father	Hindi	Tamil	2017	2017	The Hindi dub was titled: Bhairava.
Sarrainodu	Rajiv Kanakala	Defense Lawyer Govindaraju	Hindi	Telugu	2016	2017	Mayur dubbed this role when his scene was shown as a flashback.
Kodi	Swaminathan	College principal	Hindi	Tamil	2016	2017	The Hindi dub was titled: Rowdy Hero 2.
Kodi	Singamuthu	Ruling Party MLA from Coimbatore	Hindi	Tamil	2016	2017	The Hindi dub was titled: Rowdy Hero 2.
Thani Oruvan	Nagineedu	Ashok Pandian	Hindi	Tamil	2015	2017	The Hindi dub was titled: Double Attack 2.
LIE	Ravi Kishan	ACP Bharadwaj	Hindi	Telugu	2017	2017	
Soukhyam	Posani Krishna Murali	Tirupathi Train Passenger	Hindi	Telugu	2015	2017	The Hindi dub was titled: Mard Ki Zaban 2.
Janatha Garage	Rajiv Kanakala	Vikas	Hindi	Telugu	2016	2017	The Hindi dub was titled: Janta Garage.
Hyper	Posani Krishna Murali	Bhanumathi's father	Hindi	Telugu	2016	2017	The Hindi dub was titled: Son of Satyamurthy 2.
Kotigobba 2	Sudeep	Satya/Shiva	Hindi	Kannada	2016	2017	The Hindi dub was titled: Golimaar 2.
Pandaga Chesko	Raja Ravindra	Unknown	Hindi	Telugu	2015	2017	The Hindi-dub was titled: Businessman 2.
Pandaga Chesko	Jaya Prakash Reddy †	Shankar's uncle	Hindi	Telugu	2015	2017	The Hindi-dub was titled: Businessman 2.
Duvvada Jagannadham	Posani Krishna Murali	Home Minister Pushpam	Hindi	Telugu	2017	2017	The Hindi dub was titled: DJ.
Doosukeltha	Posani Krishna Murali	Avatar	Hindi	Telugu	2013	2017	The Hindi dub was titled: Dangerous Khiladi 6.
Aayirathil Oruvan	Azhagam Perumal	Ravisekharan	Hindi	Tamil	2010	2017	The Hindi dub was titled: Kaashmora 2.
Nenu Local	Posani Krishna Murali	Babu's father	Hindi	Telugu	2017	2018	The Hindi dub was titled: Super Khiladi 4.
Gopala Gopala	Posani Krishna Murali	Siddheswar Maharaj	Hindi	Telugu	2015	2018	
Chanti	Dharmavarapu Subramanyam †	Sarpanch	Hindi	Telugu	2004	2018	The Hindi dub was titled: Main Insaaf Karoonga 2.
Thikka	Posani Krishna Murali	Inspector P. Hymanand	Hindi	Telugu	2016	2018	The Hindi dub was titled: Rocket Raja.
Eedo Rakam Aado Rakam	Posani Krishna Murali	Inspector M. Koteswara Rao	Hindi	Telugu	2016	2018	The Hindi dub was titled: Hyper.
Ko	Achyuth Kumar	S. Krishnakumar "Krish"	Hindi	Tamil	2011	2018	The Hindi dub was titled: The Real Leader.
Hebbuli	Avinash	ACP Prathap	Hindi	Kannada	2017	2018	
Kaala	Rajinikanth	Karikaalan (Kaala)	Hindi	Tamil	2018	2018	The Hindi dub was titled: Kaala Karikaalan.
Hello	Posani Krishna Murali	Police Officer	Hindi	Telugu	2017	2018	The Hindi dub was titled: Taqdeer.
Jaya Janaki Nayaka	Suman Talwar	Central Minister	Hindi	Telugu	2017	2018	The Hindi dub was titled: Jaya Janaki Nayaka - Khoonkhar.
Anando Brahma	Posani Krishna Murali	Inspector Krishna Manohar	Hindi	Telugu	2017	2018	The Hindi dub was titled: Kanchana 3.
MCA: Middle Class Abbayi	Posani Krishna Murali	Pallavi's father	Hindi	Telugu	2017	2018	
Bhaagamathie	Nagineedu	CBI officer	Hindi	Telugu	2018	2018	
2.0	Rajinikanth	Dr. Vaseegaran, Chitti and Kutti (Chhotu in Hindi version)	Hindi	Tamil	2018	2018	
Luckunnodu	Posani Krishna Murali	Police Officer Shaik Nayeem	Hindi	Telugu	2017	2018	The Hindi dub was titled: Sabse Bada Zero.
Vivegam	Unknown actor	General Secretary of Europol police	Hindi	Tamil	2017	2018	
Chinnadana Nee Kosam	Naresh	Nithiin's father	Hindi	Telugu	2014	2018	The Hindi dub was titled: Sabse Badhkar Hum 3.
Karuppan	Vijay Sethupathi	Karuppan	Hindi	Tamil	2017	2018	The Hindi dub was titled: Jallikattu.
Aatadukundam Raa	Posani Krishna Murali	Somaraju	Hindi	Telugu	2016	2019	The Hindi dub was titled: Mera Intekam.
Aatagallu	Jagapathi Babu	Veerendra	Hindi	Telugu	2018	2019	The Hindi dub was titled: Hum Hai Players.
Junga	Vijay Sethupathi	Don Junga, Don Ranga (Junga's father), and Don Linga (Junga's grandfather)	Hindi	Tamil	2018	2019	The Hindi dub was titled: Junga - The Real Don.
Kavan	Pandiarajan	Pillai	Hindi	Tamil	2017	2019	
Kavacham	Posani Krishna Murali	Chintakayala Aavesam	Hindi	Telugu	2018	2019	The Hindi dub was titled: Inspector Vijay.
Nela Ticket	Posani Krishna Murali	Posani	Hindi	Telugu	2018	2019	
Kalakalappu 2	Shiva	Ganesh	Hindi	Tamil	2018	2019	The Hindi dub was titled: Sabse Bada Hungama.
Devadas	Nagarjuna	Deva	Hindi	Telugu	2018	2019	The Hindi dub was titled: Don Aur Doctor.
Sye Raa Narasimha Reddy	Ravi Kishan	Basi Reddy	Hindi	Telugu	2019	2019	
Chitralahari	Posani Krishna Murali	Narayana	Hindi	Telugu	2019	2020	The Hindi dub was titled: Premam.
Darbar	Rajinikanth	Aaditya Arunasalam IPS	Hindi	Tamil	2020	2020	
Into The Wild With Bear Grylls	Rajinikanth	Rajinikanth	Hindi	English	2020	2020	
Siruthai	Bhanu Chander	DGP	Hindi	Tamil	2011	2020	
Bhale Bhale Magadivoy	Naresh	Hanumantha Rao	Hindi	Telugu	2015	2020	The Hindi dub was titled: My Name Is Lucky.
Avunu Valliddaru Ista Paddaru!	Dharmavarapu Subramanyam †	Unknown	Hindi	Telugu	2002	2020	The Hindi dub was titled: Main Tera Tu Meri.
Desamuduru	Junior Relangi	Bala's colleague	Hindi	Telugu	2007	2020	The Hindi dub was titled: Ek Jwalamukhi.
Master	Vijay Sethupathi	Bhavani	Hindi	Tamil	2021	2021	The Hindi dub was titled: Vijay: The Master.
Master	Mahendran (voice in original version dubbed by Vijay Sethupathi)	Young Bhavani	Hindi	Tamil	2021	2021	The Hindi dub was titled: Vijay: The Master.
Naa Alludu	Nassar	Sripathi	Hindi	Telugu	2005	2021	The Hindi dub was titled: Main Hoon Gambler.
Jagame Thandhiram	Vettai Muthukumar	Rajan	Hindi	Tamil	2021	2021	
Annaatthe	Rajinikanth	Kaalaiyan (Annaatthe)	Hindi	Tamil	2021	2021	
Annabelle Sethupathi	Vijay Sethupathi	King Veera Sethupathi (Rathore in Hindi version) and Government official in climax	Hindi	Tamil	2021	2021	The Hindi dub was titled: Annabelle Rathore.
Size Zero	Posani Krishna Murali	Nijam Niranjan	Hindi	Telugu	2015	2021	
Munna	Posani Krishna Murali	Kishan (Shiva in Hindustani version)	Hindustani	Telugu	2007	2021	The Hindustani dub was titled: Rowdy Munna.
Soorarai Pottru	Karunas	Alapparai	Hindi	Tamil	2020	2021	The Hindi dub was titled: Udaan.
Kaappaan	Boman Irani	Mahadev	Hindi	Tamil	2019	2021	The Hindi dub was titled: Rowdy Rakshak.
Don Seenu	Mahesh Manjrekar (Voice in original version by Pudipeddi Ravi Shankar)	Mukesh Duggal / Duggal saab	Hindustani	Telugu	2010	2021	The Hindustani dub was titled: Don.
Ala Vaikunthapurramuloo	Rajendra Prasad	DIG Prajapathi	Hindi	Telugu	2020	2022	
Mersal	Pasanga Sivakumar	Hospital HR	Hindi	Tamil	2017	2022	
Chandramukhi	Rajinikanth	Dr. Saravanan and Vettaiyan Raja (Dr. Shankar and Raja Vikramjeet in Hindustani version)	Hindustani	Tamil	2005	2022	
Sarileru Neekevvaru	Posani Krishna Murali	CI Narayana	Hindi	Telugu	2020	2022	The Hindi dub was titled: Sarileru.
Jailer	Rajinikanth	"Tiger" Muthuvel Pandian	Hindi	Tamil	2023	2023	The Hindi dub was titled: Rajini The Jailer.
Lal Salaam	Rajinikanth	D.G. Mohideen	Hindi	Tamil	2024	2024	
Vettaiyan	Rajinikanth	SP Athiyan IPS	Hindi	Tamil	2024	2024	The Hindi dub was titled: Vettaiyan The Hunter.
Choodalani Vundi	Chiranjeevi	Ramakrishna	Hindi	Telugu	1998	2018	The Hindi dub was titled: Meri Zindagi Ek Agneepath.
Kushi	Jayaram	Thomas	Hindi	Telugu	2023	2023	
F3: Fun and Frustration	Rajendra Prasad	Nagaraju (Nagarjuna in Hindi version)	Hindi	Telugu	2022	2023	
Leo	Unknown	Leo's friend from the 90s	Hindi	Tamil	2023	2023	
Bhagavanth Kesari	Srinivas Vadlamani	Chief Minister	Hindi	Telugu	2023	2023	
Kalki 2898 AD	Rajendra Prasad	Rumi	Hindi	Telugu	2024	2024	Someone else dubbed this character in trailer.
Modern Masters: S. S. Rajamouli	Gozie Agbo	Joe Russo	Hindi	English	2024	2024	
Lucky Baskhar	Ramki	Anthony	Hindi	Telugu	2024	2024	The Hindi dub was directly released on Netflix.
Devara	Micky Makhija	DGP Radhan	English	Telugu	2024	2024	The English dub was direct to Netflix.
Pushpa 2: The Rule	Aadukalam Naren	CM KVM Narasimha Reddy	Hindi	Telugu	2024	2024	
Pushpa 2: The Rule	Aadukalam Naren	CM KVM Narasimha Reddy	English	Telugu	2025	2025	The English dub was for the reloaded version.
Thandel	Aadukalam Naren	Daddha (Chacha in Hindi version)	Hindi	Telugu	2025	2025	
Retro	Jayaram	Dr Chaplin Laali	Hindi	Tamil	2025	2025	
Coolie	Rajinikanth	Deva	Hindi	Tamil	2025	2025	The Hindi dub was titled: Coolie The Powerhouse.

==== Hollywood films ====
Film title	Actor	Character	Dub language	Original language	Original year release	Dub year release	Notes
Rear Window	Wendell Corey	Thomas J. Doyle	Hindi	English	1954	Unknown	
Diamonds Are Forever	Jimmy Dean	Willard Whyte	Hindi	English	1971	Unknown	
Jaws: The Revenge	Michael Caine	Hoagie Newcombe	Hindi	English	1987	Unknown	
Casper	Eric Idle	Paul Dibs Plutzker	Hindi	English	1995		
GoldenEye 007	Sean Bean	Alec Trevelyan (006)/Janus	Hindi	English	1995		
Deep Impact	Charles Martin Smith	Dr. Marcus Wolf	Hindi	English	1998	2009	
Snatch	Stephen Graham	Tommy	Hindi	English	2000	????	
Pitch Black	Vin Diesel	Riddick	Hindi	English	2000	2000	
The Chronicles of Riddick	Vin Diesel	Riddick	Hindi	English	2004	2004	
The Terminal	Tom Hanks	Viktor Navorski	Hindi	English	2004	2004	
The Prestige	Hugh Jackman	Robert Angier	Hindi	English	2006	2006	
Ocean's Thirteen	Brad Pitt	Rusty Ryan	Hindi	English	2007	2007	
Zodiac	Jake Gyllenhaal	Robert Graysmith	Hindi	English	2007	2007	
Body of Lies	Russell Crowe	CIA Chief	Hindi	English	2008	2008	
Tropic Thunder	Ben Stiller	Tugg Speedman	Hindi	English	2008	2008	
Hellboy II: The Golden Army	Ron Perlman	Hellboy	Hindi	English	2008	2008	
Eagle Eye	Billy Bob Thornton	Tom Morgan, FBI	Hindi	English	2008	2008	
Sherlock Holmes	Robert Downey, Jr.	Sherlock Holmes	Hindi	English	2009	2009	
Sherlock Holmes: A Game of Shadows	Robert Downey, Jr.	Sherlock Holmes	Hindi	English	2011	2011	
Smokin' Aces 2: Assassins' Ball	Tom Berenger	Walter Weed	Hindi	English	2010	2010	
The Town	Jeremy Renner	James	Hindi	English	2010	2010	
Tron: Legacy	Jeffrey Nordling	Richard Mackey	Hindi	English	2010	2010	The Hindi dub was titled: Tron: Ek Mayajaal.
Unknown	Liam Neeson	Dr. Martin Harris	Hindi	English	2011	2011	
Hugo	Ben Kingsley	Georges Méliès/Papa Georges	Hindi	English	2011	2012	
Tower Heist	Ben Stiller	Josh Kovaks	Hindi	English	2011	2011	
Hop	Hugh Laurie	Mr. Bunny (voice)	Hindi	English	2011	2011	
The Dictator	Ben Kingsley	Tamir	Hindi	English	2012	2012	
Skyfall	Rory Kinnear	Bill Tanner	Hindi	English	2012	2012	Mayur's name was mentioned on the Hindi dub credits of the DVD release of the film, also containing the Tamil, Telugu, Russian and Ukrainian credits.
Ted	Seth MacFarlane	Ted (voice)	Hindi	English	2012	2012	
Ted 2	Seth MacFarlane	Ted (voice)	Hindi	English	2015	2016	
The Visit	Peter McRobbie	Pop Pop	Hindi	English	2015	2015	
Resident Evil: Retribution	Kevin Durand	Barry Burton	Hindi	English	2012	2012	
The Bourne Legacy	Jeremy Renner	Aaron Cross/Kenneth Kitsom	Hindi	English	2012	2012	
Savages	Taylor Kitsch	Chon	Hindi	English	2012	2012	
Safe House	Denzel Washington	Tobin Frost	Hindi	English	2012	2012	
Stolen	Josh Lucas	Lucas	Hindi	English	2012	2012	
Kick-Ass 2	Jim Carrey	Colonel Stars and Stripes	Hindi	English	2013	2013	
Oblivion	Morgan Freeman	Malcolm Beech	Hindi	English	2013	2013	
The Great Gatsby	Tobey Maguire	Nick Carraway	Hindi	English	2013	2013	
Robocop	Michael K. Williams	Jack Lewis	Hindi	English	2014	2014	
Jack Reacher	Tom Cruise	Jack Reacher	Hindi	English	2012	2012	
Teenage Mutant Ninja Turtles	Tony Shalhoub	Splinter (voice)	Hindi	English	2014	2014	
Teenage Mutant Ninja Turtles: Out of the Shadows	Tony Shalhoub	Splinter (voice)	Hindi	English	2016	2016	
The Dark Knight Rises	Matthew Modine	Peter Foley	Hindi	English	2012	2012	
Ant-Man	Gregg Turkington	Dale	Hindi	English	2015	2015	
Lucy	Morgan Freeman	Professor Samuel Norman	Hindi	English	2014	2014	
Fantastic Four	Tim Blake Nelson	Dr. Harvey Allen	Hindi	English	2015	2015	
Fast & Furious 6	Luke Evans	Owen Shaw	Hindi	English	2013	2013	
Abraham Lincoln: Vampire Hunter	Jimmi Simpson	Joshua Speed	Hindi	English	2012	2012	
Deadpool	Jed Rees	The Recruiter	Hindi	English	2016	2016	
Spider-Man: Homecoming	Michael Keaton	Adrian Toomes / Vulture	Hindi	English	2017	2017	
Captain America: Civil War	Daniel Brühl	Helmut Zemo	Hindi	English	2016	2016	
Speed Racer	Matthew Fox	Racer X	Hindi	English	2008	2008	
Speed Racer	Scott Porter	Young Rex Racer	Hindi	English	2008	2008	
Django Unchained	Jamie Foxx	Django Freeman	Hindi	English	2012	2012	
Noah	Russell Crowe	Noah	Hindi	English	2014	2014	
The Imitation Game	Benedict Cumberbatch	Alan Turing	Hindi	English	2014	2018	
John Wick	Michael Nyqvist †	Viggo Tarasov	Hindi	English	2014	2014	
Jurassic World: Dominion	Sam Neill	Dr. Alan Grant	Hindi	English	2022	2022	
Terminator 2: Judgment Day	Robert Patrick	T-1000	Hindi	English	1991	Unknown	
Mission: Impossible – Ghost Protocol	Vladimir Mashkov	Sidorov	Hindi	English	2011	2014	The Hindi dub was titled: Mission: Impossible – Gupt Vidhaan.
Mission: Impossible – Fallout	Kristoffer Joner	Delbruuk	Hindi	English	2018	2018	The Hindi dub was titled: Mission: Impossible – Tabahi.
Avengers: Endgame	Gozie Agbo	Grieving Man	Hindi	English	2019	2019	
Nobody	Bob Odenkirk	Hutch Mansell	Hindi	English	2021	2021	
Venom: Let There Be Carnage	Stephen Graham	Detective Patrick Mulligan	Hindi	English	2021	2021	
The Adam Project	Mark Ruffalo	Louis Reed	Hindi	English	2022	2022	
Morbius	Michael Keaton	Vulture/Adrian Toomes	Hindi	English	2022	2022	Cameo
Thor: Love and Thunder	Christian Bale	Gorr	Hindi	English	2022	2022	
Ant-Man and the Wasp: Quantumania	Bill Murray	Lord Krylar	Hindi	English	2023	2023	
Mission: Impossible – Dead Reckoning Part One	Esai Morales	Gabriel	Hindi	English	2023	2023	
Deadpool & Wolverine	Matthew Macfadyen	Mr. Paradox	Hindi	English	2024	2024	
Venom: The Last Dance	Stephen Graham	Patrick Mulligan/Toxin	Hindi	English	2024	2024	
Gladiator II	Pedro Pascal	General Acacius	Hindi	English	2024	2024	
Mission: Impossible – The Final Reckoning	Esai Morales	Gabriel	Hindi	English	2025	2025	
Heads of State	Dan Abrams	Dan Abrams	Hindi	English	2025	2025	
Superman	Anthony Carrigan	Rex Mason / Metamorpho	Hindi	English	2025	2025	
Nobody 2	John Ortiz	Wyatt Martin	Hindi	English	2025	2025	

=== Animated films ===
Film title	Original voice	Character	Dub language	Original language	Original year release	Dub year release	Notes
Madagascar: Escape 2 Africa	Bernie Mac †	Zuba the Lion	Hindi	English	2008	2008	
Megamind	J. K. Simmons	Warden	Hindi	English	2010	2010	
The Lorax	Danny DeVito	The Lorax	Hindi	English	2012	2012	
Despicable Me 2	Steve Carell	Gru	Hindi	English	2013	2013	
The Boss Baby	David Soren	Jimbo	Hindi	English	2017	2017	
Spider-Man: Into the Spider-Verse	Jake Johnson	Peter B. Parker / Spider-Man	Hindi	English	2018	2018	
Puss in Boots: The Last Wish	Wagner Moura	Death (Maut in Hindi version)	Hindi	English	2022	2023	The Hindi dub was titled: Puss in Boots 2.
The Super Mario Bros. Movie	Khary Payton	Penguin King	Hindi	English	2023	2023	
Spider-Man: Across the Spider-Verse	Jake Johnson	Peter B. Parker / Spider-Man	Hindi	English	2023	2023	
Spider-Man: Across the Spider-Verse	Jake Johnson	Peter B. Parker / Spider-Man	Gujarati	English	2023	2023	
Migration	David Mitchell	GooGoo	Hindi	English	2023	2024	
Ramayana: The Legend of Prince Rama	Unknown	Vibhishana	Hindi	English	1993	2025	
The Bad Guys 2	Colin Jost	Mr Moon	Hindi	English	2025	2025	

== See also ==
- Dubbing (filmmaking)
- List of Indian dubbing artists
