= Vikrant Chaturvedi =

Indian actor

- Born: 1 August 1974 (age 51); Prayagraj, Uttar Pradesh, India
- Occupation: Actor
- Years active: 1997–present

Vikrant Chaturvedi (born 1 August 1974) is an Indian actor who specializes in dubbing. He has acted in Bollywood and has also voiced Indian animation and for many Hindi dubs of Hollywood and other foreign films and media. He played Mir Khorason in Chakravartin Ashoka Samrat.

== Filmography ==
=== Animated series ===
Year	Program title	Role	Language	Notes
2009	Little Krishna	Kamsa	Hindi	
2021-2024	The Legend of Hanuman	Sugreev	Hindi	Airing on Disney Plus Hotstar

=== Television series ===
Year	Program title	Role	Language	Notes
1988-89	Akbar the Great	Bairam Khan	Hindi	
2000-01	Vishnu Puran	Devrishi Narada	Hindi	
2015-16	Chakravartin Ashoka Samrat	Meer Khorasan	Hindi	
2018-19	Vish Ya Amrit: Sitara	Rajguru Gyanendra	Hindi	
2020	State of Siege 26/11	Safeed Haziz	Hindi	Web series

== Dubbing roles ==
=== Live action films ===
Film title	Actor	Character	Dub Language	Original Language	Original Year Release	Dub Year Release	Notes
Hollow Man 2	Christian Slater	Michael Griffin	Hindi	English	2006	2006	
Fantastic Four: Rise of the Silver Surfer	Doug Jones (Portrayer); Laurence Fishburne (voice)	Norrin; Radd / Silver Surfer	Hindi	English	2007	2007	
300	Rodrigo Santoro	King Xerxes	Hindi	English	2007	2007	
Avatar	Stephen Lang	Colonel Miles Quaritch	Hindi	English	2009	2009	
X-Men Origins: Wolverine	Liev Schreiber	Victor Creed / Sabretooth	Hindi	English	2009	2009	Performed alongside Shakti Singh, who voiced Hugh Jackman as James Howlett / Logan / Wolverine in Hindi.
Prince of Persia: The Sands of Time	Gísli Örn Garðarsson	Hassansin leader	Hindi	English	2010	2010	
Transformers: Dark of the Moon	John Malkovich Patrick Dempsey	Bruce Brazos Dylan Gould	Hindi	English	2011	2011	Vikrant had voiced two characters in the Hindi dub.
Fast Five	Joaquim de Almeida	Hernan Reyes	Hindi	English	2011	2011	
The Amazing Spider-Man	Rhys Ifans	Dr. Curt Connors / The Lizard	Hindi	English	2012	2012	
Skyfall	Javier Bardem	Raoul Silva	Hindi	English	2012	2012	His name was mentioned on the Hindi dub credits of the DVD release of the film, also containing the Tamil, Telugu, Russian and Ukrainian credits.
Olympus Has Fallen	Gerard Butler	Mike Banning	Hindi	English; Korean	2013	2013	
47 Ronin	Hiroyuki Sanada	Oishi	Hindi	English; Japanese	2013	2013	
The Wolverine	Hiroyuki Sanada	Shingen Yashida	Hindi	English; Japanese	2013	2013	
X-Men: Days of Future Past	Peter Dinklage	Bolivar Trask	Hindi	English	2014	2014	
Avatar: The Way of Water	Stephen Lang	Colonel Miles Quaritch	Hindi	English	2022	2022	
Mufasa: The Lion King	Mads Mikkelsen	Kiros	Hindi	English	2024	2024	
Avatar: Fire and Ash	Stephen Lang	Colonel Miles Quaritch	Hindi	English	2025	2025	

== See also ==
- Dubbing (filmmaking)
- List of Indian dubbing artists
