= Eliza Lewis =

India voice actress

- एलिजा लुईस
- Born: Mumbai, India
- Other name: Ellie Lewis
- Occupations: Voice actress; dubbing artist; director
- Years active: 1986–present

Eliza Lewis (Hindi: एलिजा लुईस) is an Indian voice actress, voice-dubbing artist and a director of Indian dubbed content and foreign dubbed content. She speaks English and Hindi as her mother tongue languages. She did her schooling from Bombay Scottish School and was a classmate and very good friend of the youngest Ashok Chakra awardee Neerja Bhanot

Her career has first starting with the animation industry all the way back in 1986 where she worked with Jenny Pinto at ThinkBig Productions. Her first shooting was with animation veteran Ram Mohan.

In 2000, she founded an dubbing studio by the name of Main Frame Software Communications, located at Sitadevi, Temple Road Mumbai. It is a division of UTV, set up during her tenure. Eliza and her crew members then begun to dub project works for Discovery, Walt Disney, Nickelodeon, Warner Bros., 20th Century Fox and other studios that are associated with this studio are highly experienced personnel in their area of expertise. In addition, she and her crew were involved in original animation casting and voice directions of several productions created in India. For foreign content, they mostly dubbed for live action and animated programs and films. Not only did she and her crew dubbed them into the Indian national language which is Hindi but also its other regional languages such as Tamil, Telugu, Marathi, Gujarati, Punjabi and certain other languages. They even dubbed some content in English as well.
