= Main Frame Software Communications =

UTV Software Communications

- Industry: Media
- Founded: 2000
- Founder: Eliza Lewis
- Headquarters: Sitadevi, Temple Road Mumbai
- Area served: India
- Key people: Eliza Lewis; Surinder Bhatia; Shailendra Pandey; Veerendra; Pushpakant Panchal; Annadurai; Saritha; Vinay Varma; Shashank Mouli; Satyaraj
- Divisions: UTV Software Communications
- Website: http://www.mainframeindia.in/

Main Frame Software Communications (also known as Main Frame India) is an Indian dubbing studio group in India, with their main studio located in Sitadevi, Temple Road of Mumbai. Both live and animated television series and films have been dubbed in Hindi and regional languages such as Tamil, Telugu, Marathi, Gujarati, Punjabi and certain other languages, but also in English as well.

Founded in 2000 by Eliza Lewis during her tenure at UTV, she worked on building the dubbing studio division of UTV and began to dub projects for Discovery, Walt Disney, Nickelodeon, Warner Bros. and 20th Century Fox. The studio's personnel are experienced in their area of expertise. They have also been involved in original animation casting and voice direction for several productions created in India.

This dubbing studio was responsible for dubbing all the Harry Potter films in Hindi. The firm who were working at UTV did some of the earliest dubbing in Hindi, starting with the film Disney's Aladdin and Baby's Day Out, before this company was found and started dubbing on its own route.

== Dubbing work ==
=== Live action films ===
A list of all the live action films that the company has dubbed.

Film title	Dubbing Director	Original date release	Dubbed date release (India)	Original Language(s)	Dubbed Language(s)	Country of origin	Edition(s) release	Notes
Homeward Bound II: Lost in San Francisco	Eliza Lewis; Greta Lewis	8 March 1996	2002	English	Hindi	U.S.	Television	Aired on STAR Gold.
X-Men	Eliza Lewis	14 July 2000	6 October 2000	English	Tamil; Telugu	U.S.	Cinema; VCD; DVD; Television	Sound and Vision India has dubbed these films in Hindi.
X2	Eliza Lewis	2 May 2003	9 May 2003	English	Tamil; Telugu	U.S.	Cinema; VCD; DVD; Television	Sound and Vision India has dubbed these films in Hindi.
X-Men: The Last Stand	Eliza Lewis	26 May 2006	2 June 2006	English	Tamil; Telugu	U.S.	Cinema; VCD; DVD; Television	Sound and Vision India has dubbed these films in Hindi.
Harry Potter and the Philosopher's Stone	Eliza Lewis	4 November 2001 (London premiere); 16 November 2001 (North America & UK)	12 April 2002	English	Hindi	U.K. U.S.	Cinema; VCD; DVD; Television	This was the very first live action film that this studio has dubbed into Hindi, on its own course. Released in the U.S., India and Pakistan as: Harry Potter and the Sorcerer's Stone.
Harry Potter and the Chamber of Secrets	Eliza Lewis	3 November 2002 (London premiere); 15 November 2002 (North America & UK)	25 April 2003	English	Hindi	U.K. U.S.	Cinema; VCD; DVD; Television	
Harry Potter and the Prisoner of Azkaban	Eliza Lewis	31 May 2004 (United Kingdom); 4 June 2004 (North America)	4 June 2004	English	Hindi; Tamil (TV); Telugu (TV)	U.K. U.S.	Cinema; VCD; DVD; Television	The Tamil and Telugu dubs have aired for television broadcasting on Cartoon Network.
Harry Potter and the Goblet of Fire	Eliza Lewis	18 November 2005	18 November 2005	English	Hindi; Tamil; Telugu	U.K. U.S.	Cinema; VCD; DVD; Television	Released the same day as the North American and UK release.
Harry Potter and the Order of the Phoenix	Eliza Lewis	11 June 2007 (North America); 12 July 2007 (United Kingdom)	13 July 2007	English	Hindi; Tamil; Telugu	U.K. U.S.	Cinema; VCD; DVD; Television	
Harry Potter and the Half-Blood Prince	Eliza Lewis	17 July 2009 (North America); 18 July 2009 (United Kingdom)	19 July 2009	English	Hindi; Tamil; Telugu	U.K. U.S.	Cinema; VCD; DVD; Television	
Harry Potter and the Deathly Hallows – Part 1	Eliza Lewis	18 November 2010 (International); 19 November 2010 (United Kingdom & North America)	19 November 2010	English	Hindi; Tamil; Telugu	U.K. U.S.	Cinema; VCD; DVD; Television	Released the same day as its North American and UK release.
Harry Potter and the Deathly Hallows – Part 2	Eliza Lewis	7 July 2011 (United Kingdom); 13 July 2011 (Australia); 15 July 2011 (North America)	15 July 2011	English	Hindi; Tamil; Telugu	U.K. U.S.	CinemaCinema; VCD; DVD; Television	
Batman Begins	Eliza Lewis	15 June 2005 (North America)	17 June 2005	English	Hindi; Tamil; Telugu	U.S.	Cinema; VCD; DVD; Television	
The Dark Knight	Eliza Lewis	18 July 2008	18 July 2008	English	Hindi; Tamil; Telugu	U.S.	Cinema; VCD; DVD; Television	
The Dark Knight Rises	Eliza Lewis	20 July 2012	20 July 2012	English	Hindi; Tamil; Telugu	U.S.	Cinema; VCD; DVD; Television	
Being Cyrus	Eliza Lewis	8 November 2005 (Lyon Asiexpo Film Festival); 24 March 2006 (India)	8 May 2006	English	Hindi	India	DVD	Dubbed for the DVD release.
Fantastic Four	Eliza Lewis	8 July 2005	8 July 2005	English	Tamil; Telugu	U.S. Germany	Cinema; VCD; DVD; Television	Released the same day, as its North American release. Sound and Vision India has dubbed this film in Hindi.
Fantastic Four: Rise of the Silver Surfer	Eliza Lewis	15 July 2007	15 July 2007	English; Japanese; Mandarin Chinese; Arabic	Tamil; Telugu	U.S. Germany; U.K.	Cinema; VCD; DVD; Television	Released the same day, as its North American release. Sound and Vision India has dubbed this film in Hindi.
Superman Returns	Eliza Lewis	28 June 2006 (North America)	30 June 2006	English	Hindi; Tamil; Telugu	U.S.	Cinema; VCD; DVD; Television	
300	Eliza Lewis	9 December 2006 (Butt-Numb-A-Thon); 9 March 2007 (North America)	27 November 2010	English	Hindi; Tamil; Telugu	U.S. Greece	Television	This is the second Hindi/Tamil/Telugu dubs made to air on UTV Action. Sound & Vision India has made the first Hindi/Tamil/Telugu dubs.
300: Rise of an Empire	Eliza Lewis	7 March 2014	7 March 2014	English	Hindi; Tamil; Telugu	U.S. Greece	Cinema	Released the same day, as its North American release.
Eragon	Eliza Lewis	15 December 2006	15 December 2006	English	Hindi; Tamil	U.S. U.K. Hungary	Cinema; VCD; DVD; Television	Released the same day as its North American release.
Ghost Rider	Eliza Lewis	16 February 2007	14 October 2013	English	Hindi; Tamil; Telugu	U.S.	Television	This is the second Hindi dub that aired on UTV Action. Sound and Vision India have produced the first Hindi dub. This studio also made a second Tamil and Telugu dub.
Ghost Rider: Spirit of Vengeance	Eliza Lewis	11 December 2011 (Butt-Numb-A-Thon); 17 February 2012	2013	English	Hindi; Tamil; Telugu	U.S.	Television	This is the second Hindi dub that aired on UTV Action. Sound and Vision India have produced the first Hindi dub. This studio also made a second Tamil and Telugu dub.
Resident Evil: Extinction	Eliza Lewis	20 September 2007 (Russia); 21 September 2007 (North America); 12 October 2007 (United Kingdom)	22 June 2010	English	Hindi	U.K. Canada	Television	This is the second Hindi dub that this studio has produced to air on UTV Action. The first Hindi dub was done by Sound & Vision India and released earlier in 2007.
Live Free or Die Hard	Eliza Lewis	27 June 2007	29 June 2007	English	Hindi; Tamil; Telugu	U.S.	Cinema; VCD; DVD; Television	Released internationally as "Die Hard 4.0". Sound and Vision India has dubbed for the next film.
The Haunting Hour: Don't Think About It	Eliza Lewis	4 September 2007	31 October 2007	English	Hindi	U.S.	VCD; DVD; Television	Aired on Cartoon Network on 31 October 2007 in Hindi. Released on VCD and DVD on 25 March 2008.
Journey to the Center of the Earth	Eliza Lewis	11 July 2008	8 September 2008	English	Hindi; Tamil; Telugu	U.S.	Cinema; VCD; DVD; Television	This was the theatrical film dubbed, not to be confused with the one made by The Asylum.
Journey 2: The Mysterious Island	Eliza Lewis	19 January 2012 (Australia); 2 February 2012 (Philippines); 10 February 2012 (North America)	3 February 2012	English; Palauan	Hindi; Tamil; Telugu	U.S.	Cinema; VCD; DVD; Television	
Hannah Montana: The Movie	Eliza Lewis	25 February 2010 (London) 10 April 2009 (North America)	8 July 2009	English	Hindi; Telugu	U.S.	Television	
Alice in Wonderland	Eliza Lewis	25 February 2010 (London) 5 March 2010 (North America)	12 March 2010	English	Tamil; Telugu	U.S.	Cinema; VCD; DVD; Television	Sound and Vision India has dubbed this film in Hindi and Bengali.
Inception	Eliza Lewis	16 July 2010	16 July 2010	English; Japanese; French	Hindi; Tamil; Telugu	U.S. U.K.	Cinema; VCD; DVD; Television	*Released the same day, as its North American release. A second Hindi dub was made in-house by UTV Software Communications for UTV Action, despite that this studio is owned by UTV.
Clash of the Titans	Eliza Lewis	2 April 2010	2 April 2010	English	Hindi; Tamil; Telugu	U.K. U.S.	Cinema; VCD; DVD; Television	*Released the same day, as its North American release.
Wrath of the Titans	Eliza Lewis	28 March 2012 (France); 30 March 2012 (North America)	30 March 2012	English	Hindi; Tamil; Telugu	U.K. U.S.	Cinema; VCD; DVD; Television	*Released the same day, as its North American release.
Green Lantern	Eliza Lewis	17 June 2011	17 June 2011	English	Hindi; Tamil; Telugu	U.S.	Cinema; VCD; DVD; Television	*Released the same day, as its North American release.
Heartbrealer	Eliza Lewis	17 March 2010	13 January 2012	French	English	France	Cinema; VCD; DVD; Television	This is a French film that was dubbed into English for Pictureworks.
Mega Piranha	Eliza Lewis	10 April 2010	2011	English	Hindi	U.S.	VCD; DVD; Television	Aired for UTV Action.
World War Z	Eliza Lewis	2 June 2013 (London, premiere); 21 June 2013 (North America)	21 June 2013	English	Hindi; Tamil; Telugu	U.K. U.S.	Cinema; VCD; DVD	Released under the title: Preto Ka Aatank ("प्रेतों का आतंक") for the Hindi dub release.
Man of Steel	Eliza Lewis	14 June 2013	14 June 2013	English	Hindi; Tamil; Telugu	U.K. U.S.	Cinema; VCD; DVD	*Released the same day as its North American release.
Pacific Rim	Eliza Lewis	12 July 2013	12 July 2013	English	Hindi; Tamil; Telugu	U.S.	Cinema; VCD; DVD; Television	Released the same day as its North American release.
Godzilla (2014)	Eliza Lewis	16 May 2014 (North America); 25 July 2014 (Japan)	16 May 2014	English; Japanese	Hindi; Tamil; Telugu	U.S. Japan	Cinema; VCD; DVD; Blu-ray; Television	Released the same day same day as its North American release.
San Andreas	Eliza Lewis	29 May 2015	29 May 2015	English	Hindi; Tamil; Telugu	U.S.	Cinema; DVD; Blu-ray; Television	Released the same day as its North American release.
Batman v Superman: Dawn of Justice	Eliza Lewis	25 March 2016	25 March 2016	English	Hindi; Tamil; Telugu	U.K; U.S.	Cinema; Sony DADC; DVD; Blu-ray	Released the same day as its North American release.
The Conjuring 2	Eliza Lewis	10 June 2016	10 June 2016	English	Hindi; Tamil; Telugu	U.S.	Cinema; DVD; Blu-ray; Television	Released the same day as its North American release.
The Legend of Tarzan	Eliza Lewis	1 July 2016	1 July 2016	English	Hindi; Tamil; Telugu	U.S.	Cinema; DVD; Blu-ray; Television	Released the same day as its North American release.
Star Trek Beyond	Eliza Lewis	22 July 2016	22 July 2016	English	Hindi	U.S.	Cinema; DVD; Blu-ray; Television	Released the same day as its North American release.
Fantastic Beasts and Where to Find Them	Eliza Lewis	18 November 2016	18 November 2016	English	Hindi; Tamil; Telugu	U.S.	Cinema; DVD; Blu-ray; Television	Released the same day as its North American release.
Kong: Skull Island	Eliza Lewis	10 March 2017	10 March 2017	English	Hindi; Tamil; Telugu	U.S.	Cinema; DVD; Blu-ray; Television	Released the same day as its North American release.
Rings	Eliza Lewis	3 February 2017	10 February 2017	English	Hindi; Tamil; Telugu	U.S.	Cinema; DVD; Blu-ray; Television	
Beauty and the Beast	Eliza Lewis	17 March 2017	17 March 2017	English	Hindi	U.S.	Cinema; DVD; Blu-ray	Released the same day as its North American release.
Alice Through the Looking Glass	Eliza Lewis	27 May 2016	27 May 2016	English	Hindi	U.S.	<---Television--->	Dubbed in Hindi for Disney Channel (India)
Definition of Fear	Eliza Lewis	25 August 2017	TBA	English	Hindi; Tamil	U.K.	Cinema	
Justice League	Eliza Lewis	16 November 2017	17 November 2017	English	Hindi; Tamil; Telugu	U.S.	Cinema; DVD; Sony DADC; Blu-ray; Television	Released the same day, as its North American release.
Pacific Rim: Uprising	Unknown	23 March 2018	23 March 2018	English	Hindi; Tamil; Telugu	U.S.	Cinema; DVD; Sony DADC; Blu-ray; Television	Released the same day, as its North American Release.
Skyscraper	Eliza Lewis	13 July 2018	1 July 2018	English	Hindi; Tamil	U.S.	Cinema; DVD; Sony DADC; Blu-ray; Television	Release the same day, as its North American release.
Aquaman	Eliza Lewis	18 December 2018	18 December 2018	English	Hindi; Tamil; Telugu	U.S.	Cinema; DVD; Sony DADC; Blu-ray; Television	Released the same day, as its North American Release.
Dumbo	Eliza Lewis; Greta Lewis	29 March 2019	29 March 2019	English	Hindi; Tamil; Telugu	U.S.	Cinema; DVD; Blu-ray; Television	Released the same day, as its North American Release.
Shazam!	Eliza Lewis	5 April 2019	5 April 2019	English	Hindi; Tamil; Telugu	U.S.	Cinema; DVD; Sony DADC; Blu-ray; Television	Released the same day as its North American Release.
Godzilla: King of the Monsters	Eliza Lewis	31 May 2019	30 May 2019	English	Hindi; Tamil; Telugu	U.S.	Cinema; DVD; Blu-ray; Television	Released the same day, as its North American Release.
Maleficent: Mistress of Evil	Eliza Lewis (Hindi dub)	18 October 2019	18 October 2019	English	Hindi	U.S.	Cinema; DVD; Blu-ray (3D); Television	Released the same day as its North American Release.
Mulan	Eliza Lewis	1 December 2020	1 December 2020	English	Hindi; Tamil; Telugu	United States U.S.	Cinema; DVD; Blu-ray; Television	Released the same day, as its North American Release.
Tenet	Eliza Lewis	3 September 2020	4 December 2020	English	Hindi; Tamil; Telugu	U.S.	Cinema; DVD; Sony DADC; Blu-ray; Television	Released the same day as its North American Release.
Wonder Woman 1984	Eliza Lewis	25 December 2020	24 December 2020	English	Hindi; Telugu	U.S.	Cinema; DVD; Sony DADC; Blu-ray; Television	Release the same day, as its North American Release.
Tom & Jerry	Eliza Lewis	26 February 2021	26 February 2021	English	Hindi; Tamil; Telugu	U.S.	Cinema; DVD; Blu-ray; Television	Released the same day, as its North American release.
Godzilla vs. Kong	Eliza Lewis	31 March 2021	24 March 2021	English	Hindi; Tamil; Telugu	U.S.	Cinema; DVD; Sony DADC; Blu-ray; Television	Released the same day, as its North American Release.
Mortal Kombat	Eliza Lewis	23 April 2021	23 April 2021	English	Hindi	U.S.	Cinema; DVD; Sony DADC; Blu-ray; Television	Released the same day, as its North American Release.
The Conjuring: The Devil Made Me Do It	Eliza Lewis	4 June 2021	13 August 2021	English	Hindi; Tamil; Telugu	U.S.	Cinema; DVD; Blu-ray; Television	Release the same day, as its North American Release.
Malignant	Eliza Lewis	10 September 2021	10 September 2021	English	Tamil	U.S.	Cinema; DVD; Blu-ray; Television	Released the same day, as its North American Release.
Jungle Cruise	Eliza Lewis	31 July 2021	24 September 2021; 12 November 2021 (Digital)	English	Hindi; Tamil; Telugu	U.S.	Cinema; Digital; DVD; Blu-ray; Television	Release the same day, as its North American release.
Dune	Eliza Lewis	22 October 2021	22 October 2021	English	Hindi	U.S.	Cinema; DVD; Blu-ray; Television	Released the same day, as its North American release.
The Batman	Eliza Lewis	4 March 2022	4 March 2022	English	Hindi; Tamil; Telugu	U.S.	Cinema; DVD; Blu-ray; Television	Released the same day, as its North American release.
Shazam!: Fury of the Gods	Eliza Lewis	17 March 2023	17 March 2023	English	Hindi; Tamil; Telugu	U.S	Cinema; DVD; Blu-ray; Television	Released the same day, as its North American release.
The Little Mermaid	Eliza Lewis	26 May 2023	26 May 2023	English	Hindi	US	Cinema; DVD; Blu-ray; Television	Released the same day, as its North American release.
The Flash	Eliza Lewis	16 June 2023	16 June 2023	English	Hindi; Tamil; Telugu	US	Cinema; DVD; Blu-ray; Television	Released the same day, as its North American release.
The Nun II	Eliza Lewis; Mohit Mahale	8 September 2023	7 September 2023	English	Hindi; Tamil; Telugu	U.S.	Cinema; DVD; Blu-ray; Television	Released the same day, as its North American release.
Aquaman and the Lost Kingdom	Eliza Lewis; Mohit Mahale	22 December 2023	21 December 2023	English	Hindi; Tamil; Telugu	U.S	Cinema; DVD; Blu-ray (3D); Television	Released the same day, its North American release.
Dune: Part Two	Eliza Lewis; Mohit Mahale	1 March 2024	1 March 2024	English	Hindi	U.S	Cinema; DVD; 4K Ultra HD; Blu-ray; Television	Released the same day, as its North American release.
Godzilla x Kong: The New Empire	Eliza Lewis; Mohit Mahale	29 March 2024	29 March 2024	English	Hindi; Tamil; Telugu	U.S	Cinema; DVD; 4K Ultra HD; Blu-ray (3D); Television	Released the same day, as its North American release.
Furiosa: A Mad Max Saga	Eliza Lewis; Mohit Mahale; Rahul Joshi	24 May 2024	23 May 2024	English	Hindi; Tamil; Telugu	U.S	Cinema; DVD; 4K Ultra HD; Blu-ray; Television	Released the same day, as its North American release.
Snow White	Eliza Lewis	21 March, 2025	21 March, 2025	English	Hindi	U.S	Cinema; DVD; Blu-ray (3D); Television	Released the same day, as its North American release.
Final Destination Bloodlines	Eliza Lewis; Greta Lewis	15 May 2025	15 May 2025	English	Hindi; Tamil; Telugu	U.S	Cinema; DVD; Blu-ray; Television	Released the same day, as its North American release.
F1: The Movie	Eliza Lewis; Greta Lewis	27 June 2025	27 June 2025	English	Hindi; Tamil; Telugu	U.S	Cinema; DVD; Blu-ray; Television	Released the same day, as its North American release.
Superman	Eliza Lewis; Greta Lewis	11 July 2025	11 July 2025	English	Hindi; Tamil; Telugu	U.S	Cinema; DVD; Blu-ray 3D; Television	Released the same day, as its North American release.
Freakier Friday	Eliza Lewis; Greta Lewis; Mohit Mahale	8 August 2025	8 August 2025	English	Hindi	U.S	Cinema; DVD; Blu-ray; Television	Released the same day, as its North American release.
The Conjuring: Last Rites	Eliza Lewis; Greta Lewis	4 September 2025	4 September 2025	English	Hindi; Tamil; Telugu	U.S	Cinema; DVD; Blu-ray; Television	Released the same day, as its North American release.

=== Animated films ===
A list of all the animated films that the company has dubbed.

Film title	Dubbing Director	Original date release	Dubbed date release (India)	Original Language(s)	Dubbed Language(s)	Country of origin	Edition release(s)	Notes
The Lion King 2	Eliza Lewis	27 October 1998	2005	English	Hindi	U.S.	VCD; DVD; Television	Aired on Disney Channel, then released on VCD and DVD.
The Lion King 1½	Eliza Lewis	10 February 2004	????	English	Hindi	U.S.	VCD; DVD; Television	It was released in India as "The Lion King 3: Hakuna Matata" (and in some other countries) and aired on Disney Channel, also released on VCD and DVD.
Bambi	Eliza Lewis	13 August 1942	2006	English	Hindi	U.S.	Television	Aired on Disney Channel dubbed in Hindi. In 2008, Sound & Vision India has produced a second Hindi dub to air on Television and released on DVD. They also dubbed it into Marathi and Gujarati.
The Jungle Book	Eliza Lewis	18 October 1967	2002	English	Hindi	U.S.	Television	Aired on Disney Channel dubbed in Hindi, much later after the original release.
The Jungle Book 2	Eliza Lewis	14 February 2003	2003	English	Hindi	U.S. Australia	Cinema; VCD; DVD; Television	
The Emperor's New Groove	Eliza Lewis	15 December 2000	????	English	Hindi	U.S.	Television	Aired on Disney Channel dubbed in Hindi.
Finding Nemo	Eliza Lewis	30 May 2003	2003	English	Hindi	U.S.	Cinema; DVD; Television	
The Incredibles	Eliza Lewis	5 November 2004	17 December 2004 (Hindi dub); 2005 (Tamil and Telugu dubs)	English	Hindi; Tamil (TV); Telugu (TV)	U.S.	Cinema; DVD; Television	The title for the Hindi dubbed version was released as: "Hum Hai Lajawab" (हम हैं लाजवाब). The Tamil and Telugu dubs were released on Disney Channel India in January 2013.
The Wild	Eliza Lewis; Sanjeet Das	14 April 2006	2006	English	Hindi	Canada; U.S.	Cinema; DVD; Television	The title for the Hindi dubbed version was titled: "Jungle Masti". (जंगल मस्ती) Even many of the character names were changed in the Hindi dub.
Cars	Eliza Lewis	9 June 2006	4 August 2006	English	Hindi; Tamil; Telugu	U.S.	Cinema; DVD; Television	Dubbed in Hindi for Disney Channel India.
Ratatouille	Eliza Lewis	29 June 2007	24 August 2007	English	Hindi; Tamil; Telugu	U.S.	Cinema; VCD; DVD; Television	Dubbed in Hindi for Disney Channel India.
Bolt	Eliza Lewis; Greta Lewis	21 November 2008	21 November 2008	English	Hindi; Tamil; Telugu	U.S.	Cinema; VCD; DVD; Blu-ray; Television	Release the same day, as its North American release.
Tangled	Eliza Lewis	24 November 2010	21 January 2011	English	Hindi	U.S.	Cinema; VCD; DVD; Television	Dubbed in Hindi for Disney Channel India.
Peter Pan (1953 film)	Eliza Lewis	5 February 1953	Unknown	English	Hindi	U.S.	Television	Aired on Disney Channel India.
Beauty and the Beast	Eliza Lewis	22 November 1991	2009	English	Hindi	U.S.	Television	Aired on Disney Channel India. Another Hindi dub was released onto home video by ZamZam Productions.
The Lego Movie	Eliza Lewis	1 February 2014 (Regency Village Theatre); 6 February 2014 (Denmark); 7 February 2014 (North America); 3 April 2014 (Australia)	17 June 2014	English	Hindi	U.S. Australia; Denmark	DVD; Blu-ray (3D)	In India, it was originally released in theaters only in English. A Hindi dub was later released for the Home Media market.
Wreck-It Ralph	Eliza Lewis	9 November 2012	9 November 2012	English	Hindi	U.S.	Television	Dubbed in Hindi for Disney Channel (India).
Frozen	Sunidhi Chauhan (Hindi dub)	22 November 2013	12 December 2015	English	Hindi	U.S.	Television	Dubbed in Hindi for Disney Channel (India)
Big Hero 6	—N/a	7 November 2014	19 August 2017	English	Hindi	U.S.	Television	Dubbed in Hindi for Disney Channel (India)
Finding Dory	Eliza Lewis	17 June 2016	17 June 2016	English	Hindi	U.S.	Cinema; DVD; Blu-ray (3D); Television	Released the same day as its North American release. Hindi dub also premiered on television on 30 July 2017 on Star Gold.
Moana	Eliza Lewis	23 November 2016	2 December 2016	English	Hindi	U.S.	Cinema; DVD; Blu-ray (3D)	Released the same day, as its North American release.
Cars 3	Eliza Lewis; Greta Lewis	16 June 2017	16 June 2017	English	Hindi; Tamil; Telugu	U.S.	Cinema	Released the same day, as its North American release.
Coco	Eliza Lewis	22 November 2017	24 November 2017	English	Hindi	U.S.	Cinema; DVD; Blu-ray (3D); Television	Released the same day, as its North American Release.
Incredibles 2	Eliza Lewis	5 June 2018	22 June 2018	English	Hindi; Tamil; Telugu	U.S.	Cinema; DVD; Blu-ray (3D); Television	Released the same day, as its North American release.
Ralph Breaks the Internet	Eliza Lewis	21 November 2018	23 November 2018	English	Hindi	U.S.	Cinema; DVD; Blu-ray (3D); Television	Released the same day, as its North American release.
Toy Story 4	Eliza Lewis	21 June 2019	21 June 2019	English	Hindi	U.S.	Cinema; DVD; Blu-ray (3D) Television	Released the same day, as its North American Release.
Frozen 2	Eliza Lewis (Hindi Dub); I. Ahmed (Tamil Dub); G. Siva Rama Prasad (Telugu dub)	22 November 2019	22 November 2019	English	Hindi; Tamil; Telugu	U.S.	Cinema; DVD; Blu-ray (3D); Television	Released the same day, as its North American release. Release as 'Phrozan 2" (फ्रोज़न 2), Hprōsan 2' (ஃப்ரோஸன் 2) & Phrōjen 2' (ఫ్రాౕజెన్ 2). for title of the Hindi, Tamil and Telugu dubbed version.
Raya and the Last Dragon	Eliza Lewis	5 March 2021	5 March 2021	English	Hindi; Tamil; Telugu	U.S.	Cinema; DVD; Blu-ray; Television	Release the same day, as its North American release.
Lightyear	Eliza Lewis	22 June 2022	3 August 2022	English	Hindi; Tamil; Telugu, Kannada; Malayalam	U.S	Cinema; DVD; Blu-ray; Television	Release the same day, as its North American release.
Inside Out 2	Eliza Lewis	14 June 2024	14 June 2024	English	Hindi	U.S	Cinema; DVD; Blu-ray; Television	Release the same day, as its North American release.
Moana 2	Eliza Lewis	27 November 2024	29 November 2024	English	Hindi	U.S	Cinema; DVD; Blu-ray; Television	Release the Same day, as its North American release.
Zootopia 2	Eliza Lewis	26 November 2025	28 November 2025	English	Hindi; Tamil; Telugu	U.S	Cinema; DVD; Blu-ray; Television	Release the Same day, its North American release.

=== Television animation ===
A list of all the animated television programs that this studio has dubbed.

Animated program	Dubbing Director	Country of origin	Original airdate	Dubbed airdate	Original language	Dub language(s)	Notes
Brandy & Mr. Whiskers	Eliza Lewis	U.S.	8/21/2004- 4/25/2006		English	Hindi	
Buzz Lightyear of Star Command	Eliza Lewis	U.S.	10/2/2000- 1/13/2001	Early 2001	English	Hindi	
Disney's Recess	Eliza Lewis	U.S.	8/31/1997- 11/5/2001	2000-2004	English	Hindi	Aired on Disney Hour on the Sony Channel from 2000 to 2004. Repeats of the Hindi dub continued to air on Disney Channel until 2011.
House of Mouse	Eliza Lewis	U.S.	1/13/2001- 12/24/2003	2001-2003	English	Hindi	
Disney's Teacher's Pet	Eliza Lewis	U.S.	9/9/2000- 5/10/2002	2001-2002	English	Hindi; Tamil; Telugu	
Scooby-Doo, Where Are You!	Eliza Lewis	U.S.	9/13/1969- 1/17/1970	2/2000 (Tamil); 2001 (Telugu)	English	Tamil; Telugu	Aired on Cartoon Network India dubbed into Tamil in February 2000, which was around the time the channel started providing content in the Tamil-dubbed format. 2001 was when they allowed their content dubbed in Telugu.
The Legend of Tarzan	Eliza Lewis	U.S.	9/1/2001- 2/5/2003		English	Hindi; Tamil; Telugu	
Timon & Pumbaa	Eliza Lewis	U.S.	9/8/1995- 9/24/1999		English	Hindi; Tamil; Telugu	
Winx Club	Eliza Lewis	Italy	1/28/2004– present		Italian	Hindi	Aired on Cartoon Network India and Pogo.
Miraculous: Tales of Ladybug & Cat Noir	Eliza Lewis	France	19/10/2015; 20/12/2015	1/5/2015	France	Hindi	Dubbed in Hindi on Disney Channel, Hungama TV and Super Hungama

=== Live action television ===
A list of all the live action television programs that this studio has dubbed.

Program title	Dubbing Director	Country of origin	Original airdate	Dubbed airdate	Original language	Dub language(s)	Notes
The Book of Pooh	Eliza Lewis	U.S.	1/22/2001- 7/8/2003		English	Hindi	Puppet series.
Goosebumps	Eliza Lewis	Canada	10/27/1995- 11/16/1998	5/15/2006- 2009	English	Hindi; Tamil; Telugu	Based on the children's books by R.L. Stine. Treasure Tower International helped this studio dub the series into these languages for 62 episodes.
Hannah Montana	Eliza Lewis	U.S.	5/6/2006- 1/16/2011	9/23/2006- 2011	English	Hindi; Telugu	
The Suite Life of Zack and Cody	Eliza Lewis	U.S.	3/18/2005- 9/1/2008		English	Hindi; Telugu	
The Suite Life on Deck	Eliza Lewis	U.S.	9/26/2008- 5/6/2011	1/30/2009- 2012(?)	English	Hindi; Telugu	
Are You Afraid of the Dark?	Eliza Lewis	Canada	10/30/1990- 6/12/2000	9/18/2008- 1/15/2009	English	Hindi; Tamil; Telugu	

== List of voice actors ==
This is a list of voice actors that are currently employed for this dubbing studio and/or have contributed to films being dubbed by this studio, and the language that they use. Both male artists and female voice actors are listed.

=== Male voice actors ===
Name	Birthdate	Birthplace	Languages spoken	Notes
Abhishek Bakshi	16 October 1992	India	English; Hindi	
Abhishek Singh	Unknown	Mumbai, India	Hindi	
Akash Ahuja	1994	Mumbai, India	English; Hindi	
Amar Babaria	10 May 1975	Mumbai, India	Hindi	
Amit Diondyi	28 June 1985	Mumbai, India	English; Hindi	
Anas Khan	Unknown	Mumbai, India	English; Hindi	
Anil Datt	Unknown	Mumbai, India	Hindi	
Anshul Chandra	Unknown	India	English; Hindi	
Ashiesh Roy	18 May 1965	Mumbai, India	English; Hindi	
Chetanya Adib	10 November 1971	Mumbai, India	English; Hindi	
Damandeep Singh Baggan	8 June 1977	Patiala, Punjab India	English; Hindi; Punjabi	
Devarsh Thakur	10 October 1992	Mumbai, India	English; Hindi	
Dilip Sinha	1951	Patna, Bihar, India	Hindi; Bhojpuri	
Karan Somyani	15 November 1989	Mumbai, India	English; Hindi	
Karan Trivedi	17 January 1984	Mumbai, India	Hindi; Gujarati	Brother of Ami Trivedi.
Kishore Bhatt	1951	Mumbai, India	Hindi	
Koustuv Ghosh	26 November 1996	Maharashtra, Mumbai, India	English; Hindi	
Mayur Vyas	c. 1973–1974	Mumbai, India	English; Hindi	
Nachiket Dighe	11 November 1987	Mumbai, India	English; Hindi; Marathi	
Omi Sharma		India	English; Hindi	
Pankaj Kalra	Unknown	Mumbai, India	English; Hindi	These two actors are sibling brothers.
Pawan Kalra	1 November 1972	Mumbai, India	English; Hindi	These two actors are sibling brothers.
Prasad Barve	10 April 1981	Mumbai, India	English; Hindi; Marathi	
Rahul Sharma	24 November 1986	Dausa, Rajasthan, India	English; Hindi	
Rajesh Jolly	20 August 1960	India	English; Hindi; Punjabi	
Rajesh Kava	18 March 1979	Gujarat, India	English; Hindi; Gujarati	
Rajesh Khattar	24 September 1966	Darjeeling, West Bengal, India	English; Hindi; Urdu; Punjabi	
Rajesh Shukla	28 January 1988	Kanpur, India	English; Hindi	
Rishabh Shukla	20 August 1966	Kanpur, India	Hindi	
Sam Parker		Mumbai, India	English; Hindi	
Samay Raj Thakkar	21 October 1966	Mumbai, India	Hindi	
Sankalp Rastogi	18 March 1984	Mumbai, India	English; Hindi	
Sanket Mhatre		Mumbai, India	English; Hindi	
Saumya Daan	2 March 1982	Mumbai, India	English; Hindi; Marathi; Bengali	
Shakti Singh	9 October	India	Hindi	
Sonu Nigam	30 July 1973	Faridabad, Haryana, India	Hindi; Kannada	
Uplaksh Kochhar	31 December 1991	India	English; Hindi; Punjabi	
Vaibhav Thakkar	8 May 1997	Maharashtra, Mumbai, India	English; Hindi	Son of Samay Raj Thakkar, who's also a voice actor.
Vikrant Chaturvedi	1 August 1970	Allahabad, India	Hindi	
Yash Narvekar	1 September 1984	Mumbai, India	English; Hindi	
Viral Shah	28 August 1986	Mumbai, India	English; Hindi	

=== Female voice actresses ===
Name	Birthdate	Birthplace	Languages spoken	Notes
Alka Sharma		South West New Delhi, India	English; Hindi	
Ami Trivedi	15 July 1982	Mumbai, Maharashtra, India	Hindi; Gujrarati	Sister of Karan Trivedi.
Diksha Thakur	26 December 1987	India	English; Hindi; Marathi	
Dinaaz Farhan		India	English; Hindi	
Eliza Lewis	Unknown	India	English; Hindi; Tamil; Telugu	Founder, Director & Proprietor of this studio, who has directed many dubbed versions of foreign films and television series.
Kumud Bappal	22 May 1985	Andheri, West Mumbai, India	English; Hindi	
Meena Gokuldas	Unknown	Malabar Hill, Mumbai, India	English; Hindi	
Meghana Erande	24 April 1981	Mumbai, India	English; Hindi; Marathi	
Mona Metha	Unknown	Mumbai, India	English; Hindi	
Nilufer Middey Khan	Unknown	India	English; Hindi	
Niti Mathur	20 October 1980	India	English; Hindi	
Parignya Pandya Shah	9 November 1985	India	English; Hindi; Marathi; Gujarati	
Pinky Rajput	20 January 1969	Mumbai, India	English; Hindi; Marathi	
Prachi Save Sathi	21 March 1982	Mumbai, India	English; Hindi	
Priya Adivarekar	22 April 1992	Mumbai, India	English; Hindi; French; Spanish; Sanskrit	
Rajshree Nath	Unknown	Mumbai, India	Hindi; Bengali	
Renu Sharda	11 April 1982	Mumbai, India	English; Hindi	
Rucha Dighe	11 November 1988	Mumbai, India	English; Hindi; Marathi	
Rupali Surve Shivtarkar	-	Mumbai, Maharashtra, India	English; Hindi; Marathi	
Sayuri Haralkar	11 December 2001	Mumbai, India	English; Hindi	
Shagufta Baig	3 April 1988	Mumbai, India	English; Hindi; Urdu	
Sonia Kulshrestha	Unknown	India	English; Hindi	
Sunita Pandey	4 October 1992	India	English; Hindi	
Toshi Sinha	27 December 1978	Andheri, West Mumbai, India	English; Hindi	
Urvi Ashar	1 May 1987	Mumbai, India	English; Hindi; Marathi	

== See also ==
- Eliza Lewis
- Dubbing (filmmaking)
- List of Indian dubbing artists
