= Sound & Vision India =

Indian dubbing studio group

- Type: Privately held Corporation
- Industry: Media
- Founded: 1992
- Founder: Leela Roy Ghosh †; Mona Ghosh Shetty
- Headquarters: Andheri West, Mumbai, India
- Number of employees: 11–60
- Website: www.soundandvisionindia.in

Sound & Vision India is an Indian dubbing studio group located in Andheri, Mumbai.

== History ==
Sound & Vision India was founded in 1992 by Leela Roy Ghosh and her daughter Mona Ghosh Shetty.

Sound & Vision India mainly adapts foreign content into other languages, including English, Hindi, Tamil and Telugu. They have also dubbed foreign productions into Urdu, Marathi, Bengali, Gujarati, Malayalam, and Punjabi.

== Dubbing work ==
=== Live action films ===
Title	Dubbing Director	Original date release	Dubbed date release (India)	Original Language(s)	Dubbed Language(s)	Country of origin	Edition(s) release	Notes
Jurassic Park	Leela Roy Ghosh	11 June 1993 (North America)	15 April 1994	English	Hindi	US	Cinema; VCD; DVD; Blu-ray; Television	Very first film that was dubbed by this studio, after its foundation in 1992.
The Lost World: Jurassic Park	Leela Roy Ghosh	23 May 1997 (North America)	September 1997	English	Hindi	US	Cinema; VCD; DVD; Blu-ray; Television	
Jurassic Park III	Leela Roy Ghosh	18 July 2001 (North America)	September 2001	English	Hindi	US	Cinema; VCD; DVD; Blu-ray; Television	
Jurassic World	Mona Ghosh Shetty; Kalpesh Parekh (Hindi dub); K. Sabarinathan (Tamil dub); M. Mythili Kiran (Telugu dub)	12 June 2015	12 June 2015	English	Hindi; Tamil; Telugu	US	Cinema	Released the same day, alongside its North American release.
Jurassic World: Fallen Kingdom	Unknown	22 June 2018	8 June 2018	English	Hindi; Tamil; Telugu	US	Cinema; VCD; Sony DADC; Blu-ray; Television	Released the same day, alongside its North American release.
Jurassic World: Dominion	Mona Ghosh Shetty	10 June 2022	10 June 2022	English	Hindi; Tamil; Telugu	US	Cinema; DVD; Blu-ray; Television	Released the same day, alongside its North American release.
The Jungle Book	Leela Roy Ghosh	25 December 1994	1994	English	Hindi	US	Cinema; VCD; DVD; Blu-ray; Television	
True Lies	Leela Roy Ghosh	15 July 1994	1995	English	Hindi	US	Cinema; VCD; DVD; Blu-ray	A second Hindi dub was made in 2004 for Television.
Schindler's List	Leela Roy Ghosh	30 November 1993 (Washington, D.C.); 15 December 1993 (North America); 10 February 1994 (Australia); 18 February 1994 (United Kingdom)	1995	English	Hindi	US	Cinema; VCD; DVD; Blu-ray	
Dragonheart	Leela Roy Ghosh	31 May 1996 (North America); 31 August 1996 (Japan); 18 October 1996 (United Kingdom)	1997	English	Hindi	US; UK; Slovakia	Cinema; VCD; DVD	There was a second Hindi dub produced for this film by a different dubbing studio.
Jumanji	Leela Roy Ghosh	11 December 1995	1997	English	Hindi	US; Canada	Cinema; VCD; DVD; Blu-ray	There was a second Hindi dub produced for this film by a different dubbing studio for Television.
The Flintstones	Leela Roy Ghosh	27 May 1994	1995	English	Hindi	US	Cinema; VCD; DVD; Blu-ray; Television	
Casper	Leela Roy Ghosh	26 May 1995	1995	English	Hindi	US	Cinema; VCD; DVD; Blu-ray; Television	
Replacement Killers	Leela Roy Ghosh	6 February 1998	July 1998	English; Cantonese	Hindi	US	Cinema; VCD; DVD; Blu-ray; Television	
Titanic	Leela Roy Ghosh	1 November 1997 (Tokyo International Film Festival); 19 December 1997 (North America)	13 March 1998	English	Hindi	US	Cinema; VCD; DVD; Blu-ray; Television	*Also aired on UTV.
Godzilla (1998)	Leela Roy Ghosh	20 May 1998 (North America); 11 July 1998 (Japan)	July 1998	English; French; Japanese	Hindi; Tamil; Telugu	US; Japan	Cinema; VCD; DVD; Blu-ray; Television	
Godzilla 2000	Leela Roy Ghosh	11 December 1999 (Japan); 18 August 2000 (North America)	13 October 2000	Japanese	Hindi	Japan	Cinema; VCD; DVD; Blu-ray; Television	
Deep Impact	Leela Roy Ghosh	8 May 1998	18 September 1998	English	Hindi	US	Cinema; VCD; DVD; Blu-ray Disc; Television	A second Hindi dub was released on a newer Home Media release on 30 March 2009.
Anaconda	Leela Roy Ghosh (Hindi dub)	11 April 1997 (North America); 22 August 1997 (Brazil)	October 1997	English	Hindi; Bengali	US; Brazil	Cinema; VCD; DVD; Blu-ray Disc	First film that the studio has dubbed into the Bengali language.
Solo for Clarinet	Unknown	15 October 1998	1999	German	English	Germany	Cinema; VCD; DVD; Blu-ray; Television	This film was dubbed into English.
Mighty Joe Young	Leela Roy Ghosh	25 December 1998	May 1999	English; Swahili	Hindi	US	Cinema; VCD; DVD; Blu-ray; Television	
King Cobra	Leela Roy Ghosh	27 April 1999	August 1999	English	Hindi; Tamil; Telugu	US	VCD; DVD; Blu-ray; Television	
Deep Blue Sea	Leela Roy Ghosh (Hindi dub)	28 July 1999	November 1999	English	Hindi; Tamil; Telugu	US	Cinema; VCD; DVD; Blu-ray; Television	
Bats	Leela Roy Ghosh	22 October 1999	2000	English	Hindi; Tamil; Telugu	US	Cinema; VCD; DVD; Blu-ray; Television	
The Matrix	Leela Roy Ghosh	31 March 1999	31 March 1999	English	Hindi; Tamil; Telugu	US	Cinema; VCD; DVD; Blu-ray; Television	The entire series was released on the same day as its North American launch.
The Matrix Reloaded	Leela Roy Ghosh	15 May 2003	15 May 2003	English	Hindi; Tamil; Telugu	US	Cinema; VCD; DVD; Blu-ray; Television	The entire series was released on the same day as its North American launch.
The Matrix Revolutions	Leela Roy Ghosh	5 November 2003	5 November 2003	English	Hindi; Tamil; Telugu	US	Cinema; VCD; DVD; Blu-ray; Television	The entire series was released on the same day as its North American launch.
The Matrix Resurrections	Leela Roy Ghosh	22 December 2021	22 December 2021	English	Hindi; Tamil; Telugu	US	Cinema; VCD; DVD; Blu-ray; Television	The entire series was released on the same day as its North American launch.
The Mummy	Leela Roy Ghosh	7 May 1999	July 1999	English	Hindi; Tamil; Telugu	US	Cinema; VCD; DVD; Blu-ray; Television	
The Mummy Returns	Leela Roy Ghosh	4 May 2001	22 June 2001	English	Hindi; Tamil; Telugu	US	Cinema; VCD; DVD; Blu-ray; Television	
The Mummy: Tomb of the Dragon Emperor	Leela Roy Ghosh	1 August 2008	1 August 2008	English; Mandarin Chinese; Sanskrit	Hindi; Tamil; Telugu	UK; US; China; Germany	Cinema; VCD; DVD; Blu-ray; Television	
Cut	Leela Roy Ghosh	23 February 2000	November 2000	English	Hindi	Australia	Cinema; VCD; DVD; Blu-ray; Television	
The Perfect Storm	Leela Roy Ghosh	30 June 2000	17 November 2000	English	Hindi; Tamil; Telugu	US	Cinema; VCD; DVD; Blu-ray; Television	
Hollow Man	Leela Roy Ghosh	4 August 2000	November 2000	English	Hindi; Tamil; Telugu	US	Cinema; VCD; DVD; Blu-ray; Television	
House on Haunted Hill (1999)	Leela Roy Ghosh	29 October 2000	December 2000	English	Hindi	US	Cinema; VCD; DVD; Blu-ray; Television	
The 6th Day	Leela Roy Ghosh	28 October 2000 (TIFF); 17 November 2000 (North America); 16 December 2000 (Japan)	19 January 2001	English	Hindi; Tamil; Telugu	US	Cinema; VCD; DVD; Blu-ray; Television	
Dude, Where's My Car?	Leela Roy Ghosh	15 December 2000	January 2001	English	Hindi	US	Cinema; VCD; DVD; Blu-ray; Television	
Cleopatra (1999)	Leela Roy Ghosh	23 May 1999	February 2001	English	Bengali	US	VCD; DVD; Blu-ray; Television	
The Little Vampire	Leela Roy Ghosh	18 August 2000 (Edinburgh Film Festival); 27 October 2000 (North America)	October 2001	English	Hindi; Tamil; Telugu	Germany; Netherlands; US	Cinema; VCD; DVD; Blu-ray; Television	
The Lord of the Rings: The Fellowship of the Ring	Leela Roy Ghosh	10 December 2001 (United Kingdom premiere); 19 December 2001 (United Kingdom and North America); 20 December 2001 (New Zealand)	15 March 2002	English	Hindi	New Zealand; UK; US	Cinema; VCD; DVD; Blu-ray; Television	
The Lord of the Rings: The Two Towers	Leela Roy Ghosh	5 December 2002 (New York City premiere); 18 December 2002 (United Kingdom and North America); 19 December 2002 (New Zealand)	28 March 2003	English	Hindi	New Zealand; UK; US	Cinema; VCD; DVD; Blu-ray; Television	
The Lord of the Rings: The Return of the King	Leela Roy Ghosh	1 December 2003 (Wellington premiere); 17 December 2003 (United Kingdom); 17 December 2003 (North America); 18 December 2003 (New Zealand)	6 February 2004	English	Hindi	New Zealand; UK; US	Cinema; VCD; DVD; Blu-ray; Television	
Collateral Damage	Leela Roy Ghosh (Hindi dub)	4 February 2002 (Premiere); 8 February 2002 (North America)	May 2002	English; Spanish	Hindi; Tamil; Telugu	US	Cinema; VCD; DVD; Blu-ray; Television	
Cadet Kelly	Unknown	8 March 2002 (North America)	Unknown	English	Bengali	US; Canada	VCD; DVD; Blu-ray; Television	Disney Channel Original Movie.
Spider-Man	Leela Roy Ghosh (Hindi dub)	3 May 2002 (North America)	24 May 2002	English	Hindi; Tamil; Telugu	US	Cinema; VCD; DVD; Blu-ray; Television	
Spider-Man 2	Leela Roy Ghosh (Hindi dub)	30 June 2004 (North America)	23 July 2004	English	Hindi; Tamil; Telugu	US	Cinema; VCD; DVD; Blu-ray; Television	
Spider-Man 3	Leela Roy Ghosh (Hindi dub)	16 April 2007 (Tokyo premiere); 4 May 2007 (North America)	4 May 2007	English	Hindi; Tamil; Telugu; Bhojpuri	US	Cinema; VCD; DVD; Blu-ray; Television	First Hollywood movie to receive a Bhojpuri dub.
Reign of Fire	Leela Roy Ghosh (Hindi dub)	12 July 2002	September 2002	English	Hindi; Tamil; Telugu	US; UK; Ireland	Cinema; VCD; DVD; Blu-ray; Television	
Baran	Unknown	31 January 2001 (Tehran Fajr Film Festival)	2003	Persian	English	Iran	Cinema; VCD; DVD; Blu-ray; Television	
Van Helsing	Leela Roy Ghosh	7 May 2004	2 July 2004	English; Latin; Czech	Hindi; Bengali	US; Czech Republic	Cinema; VCD; DVD; Blu-ray	*Sugar Mediaz produced a separate second Hindi dub for airing on Television in 2006.
Pride	Unknown	21 June 2004 (North America); 27 December 2004 (United Kingdom); 21 December 2005 (Japan)	2006	English	Hindi	UK; Tanzania	DVD; Television	Aired on television, followed by a DVD release.
Harold & Kumar Go to White Castle	Leela Roy Ghosh	30 July 2004	2004	English	Hindi	US; Canada; Germany	Cinema; VCD; DVD; Blu-ray; Television	
Lion of the Desert	Leela Roy Ghosh (Hindi Dub)	17 April 1981	17 December 2004	English	Hindi; Tamil; Telugu	Libya; US	VCD; DVD; Blu-ray; Television	
X-Men	Leela Roy Ghosh	14 July 2000	6 October 2000	English	Hindi	US	Cinema; VCD; DVD; Blu-ray; Television	
X2	Leela Roy Ghosh	2 May 2000	9 May 2000	English	Hindi	US	Cinema; VCD; DVD; Blu-ray; Television	
X-Men: The Last Stand	Leela Roy Ghosh	26 May 2006	2 June 2006	English	Hindi	US	Cinema; VCD; DVD; Blu-ray; Television	
X-Men Origins: Wolverine	Leela Roy Ghosh	29 April 2009 (Australia); 1 May 2009 (North America)	19 June 2009	English	Hindi	US; Australia; New Zealand	Cinema; VCD; DVD; Blu-ray; Television	
X-Men: First Class	Leela Roy Ghosh	1 June 2011 (United Kingdom); 3 June 2011 (North America)	10 June 2011	English; Japanese	Hindi; Tamil; Telugu	US; UK	Cinema; VCD; DVD; Blu-ray; Television	
X-Men: Days of Future Past	Unknown	10 May 2014 (Javits Center); 22 May 2014 (United Kingdom); 23 May 2014 (North America)	23 May 2014	English	Hindi; Tamil; Telugu; Urdu	US; UK	Cinema; VCD; DVD; Blu-ray; Television	Released the same day, alongside the North American release.
The Wolverine	Unknown	24 July 2013 (Various markets); 25 July 2013 (Australia); 26 July 2013 (North America)	26 July 2013	English; Japanese	Hindi; Tamil; Telugu	US; Australia	Cinema; VCD; DVD; Blu-ray; Television	
Logan	Mona Ghosh Shetty; Kalpash Parekh; Divya Acharya	3 March 2017	3 March 2017	English	Hindi; Tamil; Telugu	US	Cinema; DVD; Blu-ray; Television	Release the same day, alongside the North American release.
The Fast and the Furious	Leela Roy Ghosh	22 June 2001	2001	English; Japanese	Hindi	US; Germany; Japan	Cinema; VCD; DVD; Blu-ray; Television	
2 Fast 2 Furious	Leela Roy Ghosh	6 June 2003	July 2003	English; Japanese	Hindi	US; Japan	Cinema; VCD; DVD; Television	
The Fast and the Furious: Tokyo Drift	Leela Roy Ghosh	4 June 2006 (Universal City, California); 15 June 2006 (Australia); 16 June 2006 (North America & United Kingdom)	July 2006	English; Japanese	Hindi	US; Japan	Cinema; VCD; DVD; Blu-ray; Television	
Fast & Furious	Leela Roy Ghosh	3 April 2009	3 April 2009	English; Japanese	Hindi	US; Japan	Cinema; VCD; DVD; Blu-ray; Television	Released the same day as the North American release.
Fast Five	Leela Roy Ghosh	20 April 2011 (Australia); 29 April 2011 (North America)	6 May 2011	English; Japanese	Hindi	US; Japan	Cinema; VCD; DVD; Blu-ray; Television	
Fast & Furious 6	Unknown	7 May 2013 (Premiere, London); 17 May 2013 (United Kingdom); 24 May 2013 (North America and International)	24 May 2012	English; Japanese; Russian	Hindi	US; Japan	Cinema; VCD; DVD; Blu-ray; Television	Released the same day as its International release.
Fantastic Four	Leela Roy Ghosh	8 July 2005	8 July 2005	English	Hindi	US; Germany	Cinema; VCD; DVD; Blu-ray; Television	Released the same day as its North American release. Main Frame Software Communications gave this film a Tamil and Telugu dub.
Fantastic Four: Rise of the Silver Surfer	Leela Roy Ghosh	15 July 2007	15 July 2007	English; Japanese; Mandarin Chinese; Arabic	Hindi	US; Germany; UK	Cinema; VCD; DVD; Blu-ray; Television	Released the same day as its North American release. Main Frame Software Communications gave this film a Tamil and Telugu dub.
Zathura	Leela Roy Ghosh (Hindi dub)	6 November 2005 (Jamaica); 11 November 2005 (North America)	24 March 2006	English	Hindi	US	Cinema; VCD; DVD; Blu-ray; Television	
The Chronicles of Narnia: The Lion, The Witch and the Wardrobe	Leela Roy Ghosh (Hindi dub); K. Sabarinathan (Tamil dub); M. Mythili Kiran (Telugu dub)	8 December 2005 (United Kingdom); 9 December 2005 (North America)	9 December 2005	English; German	Hindi; Tamil; Telugu	UK; US	Cinema; VCD; DVD; Blu-ray; Television	
The Chronicles of Narnia: Prince Caspian	Leela Roy Ghosh (Hindi dub); K. Sabarinathan (Tamil dub); M. Mythili Kiran (Telugu dub)	16 May 2008 (North America); 26 June 2008 (United Kingdom)	16 May 2008	English	Hindi; Tamil; Telugu	UK; US	Cinema; VCD; DVD; Blu-ray; Television	
The Chronicles of Narnia: The Voyage of the Dawn Treader	Leela Roy Ghosh / Kalpesh Karthik (Hindi dub); K. Sabarinathan (Tamil dub); M. Mythili Kiran (Telugu dub)	30 November 2010 (Royal Film Performance); 9 December 2010 (United Kingdom); 10 December 2010 (North America)	3 December 2010	English	Hindi; Tamil; Telugu	UK; US	Cinema; VCD; DVD; Blu-ray; Television	
Eight Below	Unknown	17 February 2006	30 March 2006	English	Tamil; Telugu	US	Cinema; VCD; DVD; Blu-ray; Television	
Provoked	Leela Roy Ghosh (Hindi dub)	14 June 2006 (International Indian Film Academy Festival); 6 April 2007 (United Kingdom)		English; Punjabi	Hindi; Tamil; Telugu	UK	Cinema; VCD; DVD; Blu-ray; Television	
Click	Leela Roy Ghosh (Hindi dub)	23 June 2006	2006	English	Hindi; Tamil; Telugu	US	Cinema; VCD; DVD; Blu-ray; Television	
Casino Royale	Leela Roy Ghosh (Hindi dub)	14 November 2006 (London Premiere); 17 November 2006 (North America)	15 December 2006	English	Hindi; Tamil; Telugu	UK	Cinema; VCD; DVD; Blu-ray; Television	
Quantum of Solace	Leela Roy Ghosh (Hindi dub)	29 October 2008 (London Premiere); 31 October 2008 (United Kingdom); 14 November 2008 (North America)	7 November 2008	English	Hindi; Tamil; Telugu	UK	Cinema; VCD; DVD; Blu-ray; Television	
Skyfall	Mona Ghosh Shetty; Kalpesh Parekh (Hindi dub); K. Sabarinathan (Tamil dub); M. Mythili Kiran (Telugu dub)	23 October 2012 (London Premiere); 26 October 2012 (United Kingdom); 9 November 2012 (North America)	9 November 2012	English	Hindi; Tamil; Telugu	UK	Cinema; VCD; DVD; Blu-ray; Television	
Spectre	Mona Ghosh Shetty	6 November 2015	20 November 2015	English	Hindi; Tamil; Telugu	US	Cinema; VCD; DVD; Blu-ray; Television	Release the same day as its North American release.
No Time to Die	Mona Ghosh Shetty	8 October 2021	30 September 2021	English	Hindi; Tamil; Telugu; Kannada	US	Cinema; VCD; DVD; Blu-ray; Television	Released the same day as its North American release.
Ghost Rider	Leela Roy Ghosh	16 February 2007	16 February 2007	English	Hindi; Tamil; Telugu	US	Cinema; VCD; DVD	In 2010, UTV Action released a second Hindi dub that they produced with a new Hindi dubbing voice cast, produced by Main Frame Software Communications.
Ghost Rider: Spirit of Vengeance	Leela Roy Ghosh	11 December 2011 (Butt-Numb-A-Thon); 17 February 2012	17 February 2012	English	Hindi; Tamil; Telugu	US	Cinema; VCD; DVD	UTV Action released a second Hindi dub that they produced with a new Hindi dubbing voice cast, produced by Main Frame Software Communications.
Bridge to Terabithia	Leela Roy Ghosh (Hindi dub)	16 February 2007 (North America); 7 June 2007 (New Zealand)	16 February 2007	English	Hindi; Tamil; Telugu	US; New Zealand	Cinema; VCD; DVD; Television	
Sound of Thunder	Leela Roy Ghosh	15 May 2005 (Cannes); 2 September 2005 (North America); 24 November 2005 (Czech Republic)	June 2007	English; Mandarin Chinese	Hindi	UK; US; Germany; Czech Republic	Cinema; VCD; DVD; Television	
Transformers	Leela Roy Ghosh	28 June 2007 (Australia); 4 July 2007 (North America)	4 August 2007	English	Hindi; Tamil; Telugu	US	Cinema; VCD; DVD; Blu-ray; Television	
Transformers: Revenge of the Fallen	Leela Roy Ghosh	19 June 2009 (United Kingdom); 24 June 2009 (North America)	1 July 2007	English	Hindi; Tamil; Telugu	US	Cinema; VCD; DVD; Blu-ray; Television	
Transformers: Dark of the Moon	Leela Roy Ghosh	23 June 2011 (MIFF); 29 June 2011 (North America)	29 June 2011	English	Hindi; Tamil; Telugu	US	Cinema; VCD; DVD; Blu-ray; Television	*Released the same day as its North American release.
Transformers: Age of Extinction	Unknown	19 June 2014 (Hong Kong); 27 June 2014 (North America)	27 June 2014	English	Hindi; Tamil; Telugu	US; China	Cinema	*Released the same day as its North American release.
Transformers: The Last Knight	Unknown	21 June 2017	23 June 2017	English	Hindi; Tamil; Telugu	US	Cinema	Released the same day as its North American release.
300	Leela Roy Ghosh	9 December 2006 (Butt-Numb-A-Thon); 9 March 2007 (North America)	16 March 2007	English	Hindi; Tamil; Telugu	US; Greece	Cinema; VCD; DVD	On 27 November 2010, Main Frame Software Communications released a second Hindi dub that they produced with a new Hindi dubbing voice cast to air on UTV Action.
The Water Horse	Leela Roy Ghosh (Hindi dub)	25 December 2007 (North America); 8 February 2008 (United Kingdom)	4 April 2008	English	Hindi; Telugu	UK; US	Cinema; VCD; DVD; Blu-ray; Television	
Mega Snake	Leela Roy Ghosh (Hindi dub)	28 July 2007	11 July 2008	English	Hindi; Tamil; Telugu	US	VCD; DVD; Blu-ray; Television	
Croc	Unknown	4 November 2007	2009	English	Hindi	US; Thailand	VCD; DVD; Blu-ray; Television	
Iron Man	Leela Roy Ghosh	2 May 2008 (North America)	1 May 2008	English	Hindi; Tamil	US	Cinema; VCD; DVD; Blu-ray; Television	
Iron Man 2	Leela Roy Ghosh	7 May 2010 (North America)	7 May 2010	English	Hindi; Tamil	US	Cinema; VCD; DVD; Blu-ray; Television	
Iron Man 3	Unknown	3 May 2013 (North America)	26 April 2013	English	Hindi; Tamil; Telugu	US	Cinema; VCD; DVD; Blu-ray; Television	
The Day the Earth Stood Still	Leela Roy Ghosh (Hindi dub)	12 December 2008	2009	English	Hindi; Tamil; Telugu	US; Canada	Cinema; VCD; DVD; Blu-ray; Television	
Dragonball Evolution	Leela Roy Ghosh (Hindi dub)	10 March 2009 (Japan); 10 April 2009 (North America)	7 August 2009	English	Hindi; Tamil	US; Hong Kong; UK	Cinema; VCD; DVD; Blu-ray; Television	
Race to Witch Mountain	Leela Roy Ghosh	13 March 2009	19 March 2009	English	Hindi	US	Cinema; VCD; DVD; Blu-ray; Television	Presented by UTV Software Communications.
The Hangover	Leela Roy Ghosh	5 June 2009	26 June 2009	English	Hindi	US	Cinema; VCD; DVD; Blu-ray; Television	
The Hangover Part II	Leela Roy Ghosh	26 May 2011	27 May 2011	English	Hindi	US	Cinema; VCD; DVD; Blu-ray; Television	
The Hangover Part III	Unknown	23 May 2013	31 May 2013	English	Hindi	US	Cinema; VCD; DVD; Blu-ray; Television	
Rise of the Gargoyles	Unknown	21 June 2009	2010	English	Hindi	US; Canada; France; Romania	VCD; DVD; Blu-ray; Television	
Malibu Shark Attack	Unknown	25 July 2009	2010	English	Hindi; Tamil	Canada; Australia	VCD; DVD; Blu-ray; Television	
Avatar	Leela Roy Ghosh	10 December 2009 (London premiere); 18 December 2009 (North America)	18 December 2009	English	Hindi; Tamil; Telugu	US	Cinema; VCD; DVD; Blu-ray; Television	
2022 Tsunami	Leela Roy Ghosh	28 May 2009	April 2010	Thai	English; Hindi	Thailand	Cinema; VCD; DVD; Blu-ray; Television	A Thai film that was dubbed into English and Hindi by this studio.
The Storm Warriors	Leela Roy Ghosh (Hindi Dub)	17 December 2009 (Hong Kong)	January 2011	Cantonese Chinese	English; Hindi	Hong Kong	VCD; DVD; Blu-ray; Television	
Tooth Fairy	Leela Roy Ghosh	15 January 2010 (Mexico & Venezuela); 22 January 2010 (North America)	28 January 2010	English	Hindi	Canada; US	Cinema; VCD; DVD; Blu-ray; Television	
Clash of the Titans	Unknown	2 April 2010	2 April 2010	English	Bengali	UK; US	Cinema; VCD; DVD; Blu-ray; Television	*Released the same day as its North American release. *Main Frame Software Communications has dubbed this movie into Hindi/Tamil/Telugu.
Wrath of the Titans	Unknown	28 March 2012 (France); 30 March 2012 (North America)	30 March 2012	English	Bengali	UK; US	Cinema; VCD; DVD; Blu-ray; Television	*Released the same day as its North American release. *Main Frame Software Communications has dubbed this movie into Hindi/Tamil/Telugu.
Alice in Wonderland	Leela Roy Ghosh	25 February 2010 (London) 5 March 2010 (North America)	12 March 2010	English	Hindi; Bengali	US	Cinema; VCD; DVD; Blu-ray; Television	*Main Frame Software Communications has dubbed this movie into Tamil and Telugu.
Prince of Persia: The Sands of Time	Leela Roy Ghosh / Kalpesh Karthik (Hindi dub); K. Sabarinathan (Tamil dub); M. Mythili Kiran (Telugu dub)	6 May 2010 (London Premiere); 28 May 2010 (North America)	28 May 2010	English	Hindi; Tamil; Telugu	US	Cinema; VCD; DVD; Blu-ray; Television	*Released the same day as its North American release.
The Karate Kid	Leela Roy Ghosh	11 June 2010	11 June 2010	English; Mandarin Chinese	Hindi; Tamil; Telugu	US; China	Cinema; VCD; DVD; Blu-ray; Television	On 25 June 2011, UTV Action aired a second Hindi dub produced by UTV Software Communications in-house.
Knight and Day	Leela Roy Ghosh	23 June 2010	9 July 2010	English; Spanish; German	Hindi	US	Cinema; VCD; DVD; Blu-ray; Television	
Predators	Leela Roy Ghosh (Hindi dub)	7 July 2010 (International); 9 July 2010 (North America)	6 August 2010	English; Spanish; Russian	Hindi; Tamil; Telugu	US	Cinema; VCD; DVD; Blu-ray; Television	
The Sorcerer's Apprentice	Leela Roy Ghosh (Hindi dub)	14 July 2010	15 July 2010	English	Hindi; Tamil; Telugu	US	Cinema; VCD; DVD; Blu-ray; Television	
Tron Legacy	Leela Roy Ghosh / Kalpesh Karthik (Hindi dub); K. Sabarinathan (Tamil dub); M. Mythili Kiran (Telugu dub)	17 December 2010 (North America)	17 December 2010	English	Hindi; Tamil; Telugu	US	Cinema; VCD; DVD; Blu-ray; Television	
The Smurfs	Leela Roy Ghosh	25 June 2011 (France, Belgium & Netherlands); 29 July 2011 (North America)	23 July 2011	English	Hindi	US	Cinema; VCD; DVD; Blu-ray; Television	*Live Action with CGI Animated characters.
The Smurfs 2	Unknown	28 July 2013 (Westwood, California); 31 July 2013 (North America)	2 August 2013	English	Hindi	US	Cinema; VCD; DVD; Blu-ray; Television	*Live Action with CGI Animated characters.
Cowboys & Aliens	Leela Roy Ghosh	23 July 2011 (Comic-Con); 29 July 2011 (North America)	29 July 2011	English	Hindi	US	Cinema; VCD; DVD; Blu-ray; Television	*Released the same day as its North American release.
The Raid: Redemption	Leela Roy Ghosh	8 September 2011 (TIFF); 20 January 2012 (Sundance); 23 March 2012 (Indonesia)	11 May 2012	Indonesian	English; Hindi	Indonesia	Cinema; VCD; DVD; Blu-ray; Television	This film received an English and Hindi dub.
The Raid 2	Unknown	21 January 2014 (Sundance); 28 March 2014 (Indonesia); 11 April 2014 (UK)	30 May 2014	Indonesian; English; Japanese	English; Hindi	Indonesia	Cinema	This film received an English and Hindi dub.
Hugo	Leela Roy Ghosh	23 November 2011	4 May 2012	English	Hindi	US; UK; France	Cinema; VCD; DVD; Blu-ray; Television	
The Darkest Hour	Leela Roy Ghosh / Kalpesh Karthik (Hindi dub); K. Sabarinathan (Tamil dub); M. Mythili Kiran (Telugu dub)	22 December 2011 (Russia); 25 December 2011 (North America)	6 January 2012	English; Russian	Hindi; Tamil; Telugu	US; Russia	Cinema; VCD; DVD; Blu-ray; Television	
John Carter	Leela Roy Ghosh	7 March 2012 (France); 9 March 2012 (North America)	9 March 2012	English	Hindi; Tamil	US Cinema; VCD; DVD; Blu-ray; Television	Cinema; VCD; DVD; Blu-ray; Television	
The Avengers	Leela Roy Ghosh	11 April 2012 (world premiere); 4 May 2012 (North America)	27 April 2012	English; Russian	Hindi; Tamil; Telugu	US	Cinema; VCD; DVD; Blu-ray; Television	*Released before the North American screening.
Avengers: Age of Ultron	Mona Ghosh Shetty; Kalpesh Parekh (Hindi dub); K. Sabarinathan (Tamil dub); M. Mythili Kiran (Telugu dub)	13 April 2015 (Dolby Theatre); 1 May 2015 (North America)	24 April 2012	English	Hindi; Tamil; Telugu	US	Cinema	*Released before the North American screening.
Avengers: Infinity War	Mona Ghosh Shetty (Hindi dub); K.Sabarinathan (Tamil dub); Rana Daggubati (Telugu dub)	27 April 2018	27 April 2018	English	Hindi; Tamil; Telugu	UK; US	Cinema; VCD; DVD; Blu-ray; Television	Released before the North American screening.
Avengers: Endgame	Mona Ghosh Shetty (Hindi dub); Vijay Sethupathi (Tamil dub); Rana Daggubati (Telugu dub)	26 April 2019	26 April 2019	English	Hindi; Tamil; Telugu	US	Cinema; VCD; DVD; Blu-ray; Television	Released before the North American screening.
Prometheus	Leela Roy Ghosh	30 May 2012 (Belgium, France and Switzerland); 1 June 2012 (United Kingdom); 8 June 2012 (North America)	8 June 2012	English	Hindi	US; UK	Cinema; VCD; DVD; Blu-ray; Television	Release the same day as its North American release.
Alien: Covenant	Leela Roy Ghosh	12 May 2017	12 May 2017	English	Hindi; Tamil; Telugu	US	Cinema; VCD; DVD; Blu-ray; Television	Release the same day as its North American release.
Men in Black III	Leela Roy Ghosh	25 May 2012 (North America)	25 May 2012	English	Hindi; Tamil; Telugu	US	Cinema; VCD; DVD; Blu-ray; Television	*Released the same day as its original release. *This marked the last dubbed film that Leela Roy Ghosh directed before her death.
Abraham Lincoln: Vampire Hunter	Unknown	22 June 2012 (North America)	13 July 2012	English	Hindi; Tamil; Telugu	US	Cinema; VCD; DVD; Blu-ray; Television	
The Amazing Spider-Man	Unknown	29 June 2012 (Tokyo Premiere); 30 June 2012 (North America)	29 June 2012	English	Hindi; Tamil; Telugu; Malayalam	US	Cinema; VCD; DVD; Blu-ray; Television	*Released the same day as its Tokyo premiere, dubbed in the 4 listed Indian languages.
The Amazing Spider-Man 2	Unknown	16 April 2014 (International); 2 May 2014 (North America)	1 May 2014	English	Hindi; Tamil; Telugu; Malayalam	US	Cinema VCD; DVD; Blu-ray; Television	*Released one day before the North American release, dubbed into the 4 listed Indian languages.
Total Recall	Unknown	3 August 2012 (North America)	3 August 2012	English	Hindi; Tamil; Telugu	US	Cinema; VCD; DVD; Blu-ray; Television	*Released the same day as its original release.
The Expendables 2	Unknown	17 August 2012 (North America)	24 August 2012	English	Hindi; Tamil; Telugu	US	Cinema; VCD; DVD; Blu-ray; Television	
Resident Evil	Leela Roy Ghosh (Hindi dub)	15 March 2002 (North America); 21 March 2002 (Germany); 3 April 2002 (France); 12 July 2002 (UK)	2002	English	Hindi	Germany; France; UK; US	Cinema; VCD; DVD; Blu-ray; Television	
Resident Evil: Apocalypse	Leela Roy Ghosh	10 September 2004	26 November 2004	English	Hindi	Germany; France; UK; US	Cinema; VCD; DVD; Blu-ray; Television	
Resident Evil: Extinction	Leela Roy Ghosh	20 September 2007 (Russia); 21 September 2007 (North America); 12 October 2007 (United Kingdom)	28 September 2007	English	Hindi	UK; Canada	Cinema; VCD; DVD; Blu-ray	On 22 June 2010, UTV Action released a second Hindi dub that was produced by Main Frame Software Communications with a new Hindi dubbing voice cast.
Resident Evil: Afterlife	Leela Roy Ghosh	10 September 2010	10 September 2010	English	Hindi	Canada; Germany; US	Cinema; VCD; DVD; Blu-ray	Released the same day as its North American release.
Resident Evil: Retribution	Unknown	3 September 2012 (World premiere – Tokyo, Japan); 6 September 2012 (Europe premiere – Moscow, Russia); 14 September 2012 (International release)	28 September 2012	English	Hindi; Tamil; Telugu	Canada; Germany	Cinema; VCD; DVD; Blu-ray	
Looper	Unknown	6 September 2012 (TIFF); 28 September 2012 (North America)	12 October 2012	English	Hindi; Tamil; Telugu	US	Cinema; VCD; DVD; Blu-ray; Television	
Life of Pi	Unknown	21 November 2012	23 November 2012	English; Tamil; French	Hindi; Tamil; Telugu	US; China; India; Canada	Cinema; VCD; DVD; Blu-ray; Television	
The Hobbit: An Unexpected Journey	Unknown	28 November 2012 (Wellington premiere); 12 December 2012 (New Zealand); 13 December 2012 (United Kingdom); 14 December 2012 (North America)	14 December 2012	English	Hindi; Tamil; Telugu	New Zealand; UK; US	Cinema; VCD; DVD; Blu-ray; Television	Released the same day as the North American release.
A Good Day to Die Hard	Unknown	31 January 2013 (World premiere); 13 February 2013 (North America)	22 February 2013	English	Hindi; Tamil; Telugu; Punjabi	US; Hungary	Cinema; VCD; DVD; Blu-ray; Television	First Hollywood film to be dubbed into the Punjabi language.
Oz the Great and Powerful	Unknown	14 February 2013 (El Capitan Theatre); 8 March 2013 (North America)	8 March 2013	English	Hindi; Tamil; Telugu	US	Cinema; VCD; DVD; Blu-ray; Television	Released the same day as its North American release.
Olympus Has Fallen	Unknown	20 March 2013 (France); 22 March 2013 (North America)	22 March 2013	English	Hindi; Tamil; Telugu	US	Cinema; VCD; DVD; Blu-ray; Television	Released the same day as its North American release.
London Has Fallen	Unknown	1 March 2016 (hollywood); 4 March 2016 (North America)	4 March 2016	English	Hindi; Tamil; Telugu	US	Cinema; VCD; DVD; Blu-ray; Television	Released the same day as its North America release.
Riddick	Unknown	4 September 2013 (United Kingdom); 6 September 2013 (North America)	6 September 2013	English	Hindi; Tamil; Telugu	US; UK	Cinema; VCD; DVD; Blu-ray; Television	Released the same day, as its North American release.
Welcome to the Jungle	Unknown	27 April 2013 (Newport Beach Film Festival); 7 February 2014 (United States)	7 February 2014	English	Hindi	US	Cinema; VCD; DVD; Blu-ray; Television	Released the same day as its North American release.
Mortified Nation	Unknown	5 December 2013	March 2014	English	Hindi	US	Television	Documentary film.
Guardians of the Galaxy	Mona Ghosh Shetty	21 July 2014 (Dolby Theatre); 1 August 2014 (North America)	8 August 2014	English	Hindi; Tamil; Telugu	* US	Cinema; VCD; DVD; Blu-ray; Television	Hindi version released as Brahmand Ke Boss (ब्रह्मांड के रक्षक)
Guardians of the Galaxy Vol. 2	Mona Ghosh Shetty	5 May 2017	5 May 2017	English	Hindi; Tamil; Telugu	US	Cinema; VCD; DVD; Television	Released the same as its North American release.
Guardians of the Galaxy Volume 3	Mona Ghosh Shetty	5 May 2023	5 May 2023	English	Hindi; Tamil; Telugu	US	Cinema; DVD; Blu-ray; Television	Released the same as its North American release.
Teenage Mutant Ninja Turtles	Mona Ghosh Shetty; Kalpesh Parekh (Hindi dub); K. Sabarinathan (Tamil dub); M. Mythili Kiran (Telugu dub)	7 August 2014 (Russia & Hong Kong); 8 August 2014 (North America)	8 August 2014	English	Hindi; Tamil; Telugu	US	Cinema; VCD; DVD; Blu-ray; Television	Released the same day as its North American release.
Dracula Untold	Unknown	10 October 2014	17 October 2014	English	Hindi; Tamil; Telugu	US	Cinema; VCD; DVD; Blu-ray; Television	Released the same day as its North American release.
Ouija	Mona Ghosh Shetty; Kalpesh Parekh (Hindi dub)	24 October 2014 (North America)	30 October 2014 (Cinema); 26 February 2015 (VCD/DVD/Blu-ray)	English	Hindi	US	Cinema; VCD; DVD; Blu-ray; Television	
Dumb and Dumber To	Mona Ghosh Shetty; Kalpesh Parekh (Hindi dub)	7 November 2014 (North America)	21 November 2014	English	Hindi	US	Cinema; VCD; DVD; Blu-ray; Television	
Exodus: Gods and Kings	Mona Ghosh Shetty; Kalpesh Parekh (Hindi dub); K. Sabarinathan (Tamil dub); M. Mythili Kiran (Telugu dub) ???? (Malayalam dub)	12 December 2014 (North America)	5 December 2014	English	Hindi; Tamil; Telugu; Malayalam	US; UK; Spain	Cinema; VCD; DVD; Blu-ray; Television	Released seven days before the North American release.
Ant-Man	Mona Ghosh Shetty; Kalpesh Parekh (Hindi dub); K. Sabarinathan (Tamil dub); M. Mythili Kiran (Telugu dub)	29 June 2015 (Dolby Theatre); 17 July 2015 (North America)	24 July 2015	English	Hindi; Tamil; Telugu	US	Cinema	
Ant-Man and the Wasp	Mona Ghosh Shetty; Kalpesh Parekh (Hindi dub); K. Sabarinathan (Tamil dub); M.Mythili Kiran (Telugu dub)	6 July 2018	13 July 2018	English	Hindi; Tamil; Telugu	US	Cinema; VCD; DVD; Blu-ray; Television	Released the same day as its North American release.
Dil to Pagal Hai	Unknown	31 October 1997	31 October 1997	Hindi	Tamil; Telugu	India	Cinema; VCD; DVD; Blu-ray; Television	
Enthiran	Leela Roy Ghosh (Hindi dub); M. Mythili Kiran (Telugu dub)	1 October 2010	1 October 2010	Tamil	Hindi; Telugu	India	Cinema; VCD; DVD; Blu-ray; Television	Released as Robo (రోబో) in Telugu and Robot (रोबोट) in Hindi.
Dhoom 3	Unknown	20 December 2013	20 December 2013	Hindi	Tamil; Telugu	India	Cinema; VCD; DVD; Blu-ray; Television	
Bang Bang!	Unknown	2 October 2014	2 October 2014	Hindi	Tamil; Telugu	India	Cinema; VCD; DVD; Blu-ray; Television	
Krrish 3	Unknown	1 November 2013	1 November 2013	Hindi; Tamil; Telugu		India	Cinema; VCD; DVD; Blu-ray; Television	Some actors couldn't properly speak their lines, due to temporary health issues. Some voice actors were called in to dub the dialogues of certain actors post-production via ADR, even though this film was already shot in Hindi, Tamil and Telugu.
Gunday	Unknown	14 February 2014	14 February 2014	Hindi; Bengali		India	Cinema; VCD; DVD; Blu-ray; Television	Some actors couldn't properly speak their lines, due to temporary health issues. Some voice actors were called in to dub the dialogues of certain actors post-production via ADR, even though this film was already shot in Hindi, Tamil and Telugu.
Happy New Year	Unknown	24 October 2014	24 October 2014	Hindi	Hindi; Tamil; Telugu	India	Cinema; VCD; DVD; Blu-ray; Television	Some actors couldn't properly speak their lines, due to temporary health issues. Some voice actors were called in to dub the dialogues of certain actors post-production via ADR, even though this film was already shot in Hindi. It was also dubbed into Tamil and Telugu.
Hotel Mumbai	Unknown	22 March 2019	29 November 2019	English; Hindi; Punjab	Hindi; Tamil; Telugu	US; India	Cinema; VCD; DVD; Blu-ray; Television	the film received a Hindi, Tamil and Telugu dub.
Pete's Dragon	Unknown	12 August 2016	19 August 2016	English	Hindi	UK; US	Cinema; VCD; DVD; Blu-ray	Release the same day as its North American release.
The Jungle Book	Mona Ghosh Shetty (Hindi dub) Sabari Nathan (Tamil dub) Satyanarayana Venkata Muppalla (Telugu dub)	15 April 2016	8 April 2016	English	Hindi; Tamil; Telugu	US	Cinema; VCD; DVD; Blu-ray; Television	Released the same day as its North American release.
Deadpool	Mona Ghosh Shetty	12 February 2016	12 February 2016	English	Hindi; Tamil; Telugu	US	Cinema; VCD; DVD; Blu-ray; Television	Released the same day as its North American Release.
Deadpool 2	Mona Ghosh Shetty; Kalpesh Parekh	18 May 2018	18 May 2018	English	Hindi; Tamil; Telugu	US	Cinema; VCD; DVD; Blu-ray; Television	Released the same day as its North American release.
Mission: Impossible – Fallout	Mona Ghosh Shetty; Kalpesh Parekh	27 July 2018	27 July 2018	English	Hindi; Tamil; Telugu	US	Cinema; VCD; DVD; Blu-ray Television	Released the same day as its North American release.
Captain America: The First Avenger	Unknown	22 July 2011	29 July 2011	English	Hindi; Tamil; Telugu	US	Cinema; VCD; DVD; Blu-ray; Television	Release the same day, as its North American release.
Captain America: The Winter Soldier	Mona Ghosh Shetty	4 April 2014	4 April 2014	English	Hindi; Tamil	US	Cinema; VCD; DVD; Blu-ray; Television	Released the same day as its North American release.
Captain America: Civil War	Unknown	6 May 2016	6 May 2016	English	Hindi; Tamil; Telugu	US	Cinema; VCD; DVD; Blu-ray	Released the same day as its North American release.
Captain Marvel	Mona Ghosh Shetty (Hindi dub)	8 March 2019	8 March 2019	English	Hindi; Tamil; Telugu	US	Cinema; VCD; DVD; Blu-ray; Television	Released the same day as its North American release.
Doctor Strange	Mona Ghosh Shetty	4 November 2016	4 November 2016	English	Hindi	US	Cinema; DVD; Blu-ray; Television	Released the same day as its North American release.
Alita: Battle Angel	Unknown	14 February 2019	8 February 2019	English	Hindi; Tamil; Telugu	US	Cinema; DVD; VCD; Blu-ray; Television	Released the same day as its North American release.
The Lion King	Mona Ghosh Shetty; Kalpesh Parekh	19 July 2019	19 July 2019	English	Hindi; Tamil; Telugu	US	Cinema; DVD; Blu-ray; Television	Released the same day as its North American release.
Aladdin	Mona Ghosh Shetty (Hindi dub); Karthik (Tamil dub); Varun Taj (Telugu dub)	24 May 2019	24 May 2019	English	Hindi; Tamil; Telugu	US	Cinema; DVD; VCD; Blu-ray; Television	Released the same day as its North American release.
Rambo: Last Blood	Mona Ghosh Shetty	18 September 2019	18 September 2019	English	Hindi; Tamil; Telugu	US	Cinema; VCD; DVD; Blu-ray; Television	Release the same day, as its North American release.
Terminator: Genisys	Unknown	1 July 2015	3 July 2015	English	Hindi; Tamil	UK; US	Cinema; VCD; DVD; Blu-ray	This film received a Hindi and Tamil dub.
Terminator: Dark Fate	(First dub)	1 November 2019	1 November 2019	English; Spanish	Hindi; Telugu	New Zealand; Spain; UK; US	Cinema; VCD; DVD; Blu-ray	Released the same day as its North American Release. This film received a Hindi and Telugu dub.
X-Men: Dark Phoenix	KP Sekar (Tamil dub)	7 June 2019	5 June 2019	English	Hindi; Tamil; Telugu	UK; US	Cinema; VCD; DVD; Blu-ray	Released the same day as its North American release.
Mulan	Unknown	4 September 2020	4 December 2020	English	Hindi; Tamil; Telugu	US	Digital; VCD; DVD; Blu-ray; Television	Released the same day as its North American release.
Cruella	Unknown	28 May 2021	27 August 2021	English	Hindi; Tamil; Telugu	US	Digital; VCD; DVD; Blu-ray; Television	The entire series was released on the same day as its North American launch.
Black Widow	Unknown	7 July 2021	3 September 2021	English	Hindi; Telugu; Kannada; Malayalam	US	Digital; VCD; DVD; Blu-ray; Television	Released the same day as its North American Release. This film received a Hindi, Telugu, Kannada and Malayalam dub.

=== Animated films ===
Title	Dubbing Director	Original date release	Dubbed date release (India)	Original Language(s)	Dubbed Language(s)	Country of origin	Edition release(s)	Notes
Jonny's Golden Quest	Leela Roy Ghosh	4 April 1993	Unknown	English	Hindi	US	Television	
Curly the Littlest Puppy	Unknown	1995	Unknown	English	Hindi; Urdu; Bengali	Japan; Canada; US	Television	Dubbed for Television.
Antz	Leela Roy Ghosh	2 October 1998	November 1998	English	Hindi	US	Cinema; VCD; DVD; Blu-ray; Television	
Prince of Egypt	Leela Roy Ghosh	18 December 1998	January 1999	English	Hindi	US	Cinema; VCD; DVD; Blu-ray; Television	
Shrek	Leela Roy Ghosh	18 May 2001	2001	English	Hindi	US	Cinema; VCD; DVD; Blu-ray; Television	
Shrek 2	Leela Roy Ghosh	19 May 2004	20 August 2004	English	Hindi	US	Cinema; VCD; DVD; Blu-ray; Television	
Shrek the Third	Leela Roy Ghosh	18 May 2007	1 June 2007	English	Hindi	US	Cinema; VCD; DVD; Blu-ray; Television	
Shrek Forever After	Leela Roy Ghosh	21 May 2010	21 May 2010	English	Hindi	US	Cinema; VCD; DVD; Blu-ray; Television	Released the same day as its North American release.
Puss in Boots	Subrato Ghosh	28 October 2011	2 December 2011	English	Hindi	US	Cinema; VCD; DVD; Blu-ray; Television	
Sinbad: Legend of the Seven Seas	Leela Roy Ghosh	2 July 2003	July 2003	English	Hindi	US	Cinema; VCD; DVD; Blu-ray; Television	
Shark Tale	Leela Roy Ghosh	10 September 2004 (Venice Film Festival); 1 October 2004 (North America)	19 November 2004	English	Hindi	US	Cinema; VCD; DVD; Blu-ray; Television	
Madagascar	Leela Roy Ghosh	27 May 2005	12 August 2005	English	Hindi; Tamil; Telugu	US	Cinema; VCD; DVD; Blu-ray; Television	
Madagascar: Escape 2 Africa	Leela Roy Ghosh	7 November 2008	19 December 2008	English	Hindi; Tamil; Telugu	US	Cinema; VCD; DVD; Blu-ray; Television	
Madagascar 3: Europe's Most Wanted	Unknown	18 May 2012 (Cannes Film Festival); 8 June 2012 (North America)	8 June 2012	English	Hindi; Tamil; Telugu	US	Cinema; VCD; DVD; Blu-ray; Television	Released the same day as its North American release.
Bambi	Leela Roy Ghosh	13 August 1942	2008	English	Hindi; Marathi; Gujarati	US	Television; DVD	This was the second Hindi dub produced for the TV and DVD release of this movie. and was also dubbed into Marathi and Gujarati. Main Frame Software Communications produced the first Hindi dub for Disney Channel to air on television.
Cinderella	Unknown	15 February 1950	2009	English	Bengali	US	Television	Aired on Television.
Kung Fu Panda	Leela Roy Ghosh	6 June 2008	11 July 2008	English	Hindi	US	Cinema; VCD; DVD; Blu-ray; Television	
Kung Fu Panda 2	Leela Roy Ghosh	26 May 2011	26 May 2011	English	Hindi	US	Cinema; VCD; DVD; Blu-ray; Television	
Kung Fu Panda 3	Leela Roy Ghosh	29 January 2016	1 April 2016	English	Hindi; Tamil; Telugu	US	Cinema; VCD; DVD; Blu-ray; Television	Released the same day as its North American release.
How to Train Your Dragon	Leela Roy Ghosh	26 March 2010	16 April 2010	English	Hindi; Tamil; Telugu	US	Cinema; VCD; DVD; Blu-ray; Television	
How to Train Your Dragon 2	Unknown	16 May 2014 (2014 Cannes Film Festival); 13 June 2014 (North America)	June 2014	English	Hindi; Tamil; Telugu	US	Cinema; VCD; DVD; Blu-ray; Television	This studio along with Studio One helped dub the movie into Hindi, Tamil and Telugu. The DVD release only mentioned Studio One in the Hindi dubbing credits.
Turbo	Unknown	24 June 2013 (CineEurope, Barcelona); 17 July 2013 (North America)	19 July 2013	English	Hindi	US	Cinema; VCD; DVD; Blu-ray; Television	
Ice Age	Leela Roy Ghosh	15 March 2002	3 May 2002	English	Hindi	US	Cinema; VCD; DVD; Blu-ray; Television	
Ice Age: The Meltdown	Leela Roy Ghosh	31 March 2006	21 April 2006	English	Hindi	US	Cinema; VCD; DVD; Blu-ray; Television	
Ice Age: Dawn of the Dinosaurs	Leela Roy Ghosh	1 July 2009	3 July 2009	English	Hindi	US	Cinema; VCD; DVD; Blu-ray; Television	
Ice Age: Continental Drift	Unknown	13 July 2012	21 July 2012	English	Hindi	US	Cinema; VCD; DVD; Blu-ray; Television	
Rio	Leela Roy Ghosh	22 March 2011 (World Premiere); 15 April 2011 (North America)	8 April 2011	English; Portuguese	Hindi	US	Cinema; VCD; DVD; Blu-ray; Television	
Rio 2	Unknown	20 March 2014 (Azerbaijan); 11 April 2014 (North America)	11 April 2014	English; Portuguese	Hindi; Tamil; Telugu	US	Cinema	
The Adventures of Tintin: The Secret of the Unicorn	Leela Roy Ghosh	23 October 2011 (Brussels Premiere); 21 December 2011 (North America)	11 November 2011	English	Hindi	US; New Zealand	Cinema; VCD; DVD; Blu-ray; Television	
Rise of the Guardians	Unknown	10 October 2012 (Mill Valley Film Festival); 21 November 2012 (North America)	21 December 2012	English	Hindi	US	Cinema; VCD; DVD; Blu-ray; Television	
The Croods	Unknown	22 March 2013	19 April 2013	English	Hindi	US	Cinema; VCD; DVD; Blu-ray; Television	
A Flintstones Christmas Carol	Unknown	21 November 1994	30 December 2014	English	Hindi	US; Philippines	Television	
Epic	Unknown	24 May 2013	17 May 2013	English	Hindi	US	Cinema; VCD; DVD; Blu-ray; Television	
Planes	Unknown	23 August 2013	2015	English	Hindi	US	Television	The Hindi dubbing finished in 2014 but didn't premiere until late 2015.
Ice Age: Collision Course	Unknown	22 July 2016	15 July 2016	English	Hindi; Tamil; Telugu	US	Cinema; DVD; Blu-ray; VCD; Television	released the same day as its North American release.
The Boss Baby	Unknown	31 March 2017	31 March 2017	English	Hindi	US	Cinema; DVD; Blu-ray	
Finding Dory	Unknown	17 June 2016	15 October 2017	English	Bengali	US	Television	Bengali dub premiered on Star Jalsha.

=== Animated series ===
Title	Dubbing Director	Country of origin	Original airdate	Dubbed airdate	Original language	Dub language(s)	Notes
Argai: The Prophecy	Unknown	France	9/2/2000-2000	????	French	Hindi; Bengali	
Baby Looney Tunes	Unknown	US	9/7/2002- 20 April 2005	????	English	Hindi; Tamil; Telugu	
Batman: The Animated Series	Unknown	US	9/5/1992- 15 September 1995	9/9/2000- 7/8/2005	English	Hindi	
Code Lyoko	Unknown	France	9/3/2003-11/10/2007	????	French	Hindi	
Denver The Last Dinosaur	Unknown	US; France	9/29/1988-11/22/1988	1999	English	Urdu	
Dexter's Laboratory	Unknown	US	4/27/1996-11/20/2003	8/22/1999-2006	English	Hindi	
Donkey Kong Country	Unknown	France; Canada	9 April 1996 (France); 8/15/1997-7/7/2000 (North America)	2006–2008	English	Hindi	Aired on Disney Channel India.
Dragon Booster	Unknown	Canada; US	10/23/2004-12/23/2006	????	English	Hindi; Tamil; Telugu	
Dragon Hunters	Unknown	France	1/14/2006-2007	????	French	Hindi	
Duck Dodgers	Unknown	US	8/23/2003-11/11/2005	????	English	Hindi; Tamil; Malayalam	
Gargoyles	Unknown	US	10/24/1994-2/15/1997	????	English	Bengali	
Goof Troop	Unknown	US	9/5/1992-5/1993	????	English	Tamil; Telugu	
He-Man and the Masters of the Universe	Unknown	US	9/5/1983- 21 November 1985	????	English	Hindi	
Hot Wheels Battle Force 5	Unknown	US; Canada	8/28/2009- 16 July 2011	4/30/2010-Late 2011	English	Hindi	Aired on Cartoon Network India.
Jackie Chan Adventures	Unknown	US	9/9/2000- 7/8/2005	????	English	Hindi	Aired on Cartoon Network India. On 22 June 2014, the series returned to Hungama TV, containing a new Hindi dub and a new voice cast. A new translation by UTV Software Communications was created due to license rights and Cartoon Network and Hungama TV being rival studios. Additionally, Disney (the owner of the channel since 2011) was unable to use the original Hindi dub.
Johnny Bravo	Unknown	US	14 July 1997 – 27 August 2004	8/22/1999-????	English	Hindi	
Johnny Test	Unknown	US (Seasons 1–3); Canada (Seasons 4-current)	9/17/2005- current	????	English	Hindi	
Martin Mystery	Unknown	France; Canada; Italy; Japan	10/3/2003-Current	????	French; Italian (Dubbed); English (Dubbed)	Hindi; Tamil; Telugu	
Mortal Kombat: Defenders of the Realm	Unknown	US	9/21/1996-12/14/1996	1998	English	Bengali	
Oban Star Racers	Unknown	France; Canada; Japan	6/5/2006- 12/11/2006	????	French; English; Japanese	Hindi; Tamil; Telugu	
Phineas and Ferb	Unknown	US	8/17/2007- 6/12/2015	6/1/2008- 28 June 2015	English	Bengali	
Popeye the Sailor	Unknown	US	7/14/1933-1957	????	English	Hindi	Aired much later dubbed in Hindi.
Popeye the Sailor (1960s TV series)	Unknown	US	1960–1962	????	English	Hindi	Aired much later dubbed in Hindi.
Samurai Jack	Unknown	US	8/10/2001- 25 September 2004	11/30/2001- 2005	English	Hindi	
Special Agent Oso	Unknown	US; UK; Canada; New Zealand; Australia; Mexico; Peru; Argentina; South Korea; Japan	4/4/2009-5/17/2012	????	English; Spanish	Hindi	
Storm Hawks	Unknown	Canada	5/27/2007-4/6/2009	????	English	Hindi	
SWAT Kats: The Radical Squadron	Unknown	US	9/11/1993-8/9/1995	1/4/1999-2000	English	Hindi	Aired on Cartoon Network India dubbed into Hindi on 4 January 1999, which was the day when the channel started providing content in the Hindi-dubbed format.
Teenage Mutant Ninja Turtles (2003 TV series)	Unknown	US; South Korea; Japan	2/8/2003- 28 February 2009	????	English	Hindi	Aired on Cartoon Network India.
The Adventures of Tintin	Unknown	France; Canada	10/2/1991-9/28/1992	Summer 2000–2001	French; English	Hindi	On Republic Day 2013, A second Hindi dub was produced for this series, most likely due to license rights.
The Flintstones	Unknown	US	9/30/1960- 4/1/1966	1/4/1999-2006	English	Hindi	Aired on Cartoon Network India in Hindi on 4 January 1999.
The Jetsons	Unknown	US	9/23/1962- 17 March 1963 (first run); 9/16/1985- 11/12/1987 (second run)	1/4/1999-2004	English	Hindi	Aired on Cartoon Network India in Hindi on 4 January 1999.
The Mask: Animated Series	Unknown	US	8/12/1995-8/30/1997	1/4/1999-2001	English	Hindi	Aired on Cartoon Network India in Hindi on 4 January 1999.
The Powerpuff Girls	Unknown	US	11/18/1998-3/25/2005	????	English	Hindi	
The Real Adventures of Jonny Quest	Unknown	US	8/26/1996-9/24/1999	????	English	Hindi	
The Save-Ums!	Unknown	Canada	3/11/2003-7/11/2006	????	English	Hindi	
The Sylvester & Tweety Mysteries	Unknown	US	9/9/1995- 18 December 2002	????	English	Hindi	
The Tom & Jerry Kids Show	Unknown	US	9/8/1990-11/27/1994	????	English	Bengali	
Teen Titans	Unknown	US	7/19/2003-1/16/2006	????	English	Hindi	
We Bare Bears	Unknown	US	7/27/2015-5/27/2019	11/29/2015-Current	English	Hindi; Tamil; Telugu	
Bakugan Battle Brawlers	Unknown	Japan	4/5/2007- 20 March 2008	2009–2010	Japanese	Hindi	The Indian version was brought by Jibi George and created by Nelvana, Allspark, and Spin Master.
Beyblade	Unknown	Japan	1/8/2001- 24 December 2001	6/3/2005-2006	Japanese	Hindi	The Hindi dub of this series is based on the Nelvana-Hasbro Studios English dub, thus being a revised translation, Aired on Cartoon Network India
Beyblade V-Force	Unknown	Japan	1/7/2002- 24 December 2001	2006–2007	Japanese	Hindi	Aired on Cartoon Network India
Beyblade G-Revolution	Unknown	Japan	1/6/2003- 29 December 2003	2007–2008	Japanese	Hindi	Aired on Cartoon Network India
Beyblade: Metal Fusion	Unknown	Japan	4/4/2009- 28 March 2010	11 October 2010 – July 2011	Japanese	Hindi	Aired on Cartoon Network India
Beyblade: Metal Masters	Unknown	Japan	4/4/2010- 27 March 2011	22 October 2011 – July 2012	Japanese	Hindi	Aired on Cartoon Network India
Beyblade: Metal Fury	Unknown	Japan	4/10/2011- 4/1/2012	27/10/2013- 16 March 2014	Japanese	Hindi	Aired on Cartoon Network India
Deltora Quest	Unknown	Japan	1/9/2007- 29 March 2008	Late 2010–2012	Japanese	Hindi	Hindi dub aired on Cartoon Network in Pakistan.
ReLIFE	Unknown	Japan	2/7/2016- 21/3/2018	2/3/2023-Ongoing	Japanese	Hindi	Hindi dub aired on Crunchyroll.
Dinosaur King	Unknown	Japan	2/4/2007- 27 January 2008	2012–Current	Japanese	Hindi	The Hindi dub of the series was based on the 4Kids Entertainment English dub, being a revised translation.
Dragon Ball	Unknown	Japan	26 February 1986 -4/12/1989		Japanese	Hindi	
Dragon Ball Z	Unknown	Japan	4/26/1989- 31 January 1996	2001–2008	Japanese	Hindi	The Hindi dub of the series was based on the edited Funimation Entertainment-Saban Entertainment-Ocean Productions English dub, being a revised translation.
Naruto	Unknown	Japan	10/3/2002- 2/8/2007	2008	Japanese	Hindi	
Pokémon	Subrato Ghosh	Japan	4/1/1997- Current	5/12/2003- 10/2013 (India); 2004–2013 (Pakistan)	Japanese	Hindi; Tamil; Telugu (2011–Current)	The First 8 seasons of the Hindi dub was based on the 4Kids Entertainment English dub. The later seasons were also revised translations of the English dub. Originally aired on Cartoon Network in India in 2011. Later, the show received Tamil and Telugu dubs for the later seasons, when the anime moved to Pogo. In Pakistan however, it has aired on Cartoon Network since 2004. Crest Animation Studios originally dubbed the first four seasons until Sound and Video India got the rights to dub it until late 2013. On 19 May 2014, The Indigo League season begun to air on Hungama TV, containing a new Hindi dub, a new voice cast, and a new translation by UTV Software Communications, due to license rights and because Cartoon Network and Hungama TV are rival channels. It is also because Disney (the owner of the channel since 2011) could not afford to use the original dub. Both Hindi dubs are revised translations of their English adaptation counterparts.
Powerpuff Girls Z	Unknown	Japan	7/1/2006- 30 June 2007	Unknown	Japanese	Hindi	Aired on Cartoon Network.
The Flying House	Unknown	Japan	4/5/1982- 28 March 1983	Unknown	Japanese	Oriya	

=== Live action television series ===
Title	Dubbing Director	Country of origin	Original airdate	Dubbed airdate	Original language	Dub language(s)	Notes
Bharat Ka Veer Putra – Maharana Pratap	Unknown	India	5/27/2013- 12/10/2015		Hindi		Some actors couldn't properly speak their lines, due to temporary health issues. voice actors were called in to dub the dialogues of these actors during post-production via ADR, even though this TV series was already shot in Hindi.
Boy Meets World	Unknown	US	9/24/1993- 5 May 2000	Unknown	English	Hindi	
Conan the Adventurer	Unknown	US	9/22/1997-5/25/1998	Unknown	English	Hindi	
Earth: Final Conflict	Unknown	Canada	10/6/1997-5/20/2002	Unknown	English	Bengali	
Kamen Rider: Dragon Knight	Unknown	US; Japan	1/3/2009- 26 December 2009	1/8/2010- 10/8/2010	English	Hindi; Tamil; Telugu	Aired on Cartoon Network. Based on Japanese Tokusatsu, Kamen Rider Ryuki. All 40 episodes were dubbed in the three listed languages and were broadcast on the network.
Heldi	Unknown	Germany; Switzerland; Australia	9/13/1978- ????	Unknown	German	Hindi; Marathi; Gujarati	
Here Comes Honey Boo Boo	Unknown	US	8/8/2012- 14 August 2014	1/17/2014-current	English	Hindi	Reality TV series.
The Jewel in the Crown	Unknown	UK	1/9/1984-4/3/1984	Unknown	English	Bengali	
LazyTown	Unknown	Iceland; US; UK	8/16/2004-current	Unknown	English	Hindi	
Life with Derek	Unknown	Canada	9/18/2005- 25 March 2009	Unknown	English	Hindi	Aired on Disney Channel India.
Mighty Morphin Power Rangers	Unknown	US; Japan	8/28/1993- 27 November 1995	Unknown	English	Hindi	Based on Japanese Tokusatsu, Kyōryū Sentai Zyuranger.
Mortified	Unknown	Australia	6/20/2006- 4/11/2007	2007–2008	English	Hindi	
Power Rangers: Mystic Force	Unknown	US; Japan	2/20/2006- 13 November 2006	10/2/2006- 5/7/2007	English	Hindi	Based on Japanese Tokusatsu, Mahou Sentai Magiranger.
Power Rangers RPM	Unknown	US; Japan	3/7/2009- 26 December 2009	Unknown	English	Hindi; Tamil; Telugu	Based on Japanese Tokusatsu, Engine Sentai Go-onger.
Power Rangers S.P.D.	Unknown	US; Japan	2/5/2005- 14 November 2005	Unknown	English	Hindi; Tamil; Telugu	Based on Japanese Tokusatsu, Tokusou Sentai Dekaranger.
Spellbinder: Land of the Dragon Lord	Unknown	Australia; China; Poland	9/1/1997-10/24/1997	Unknown	English	Bengali	
Team Knight Rider	Unknown	US	10/6/1997-5/18/1998	Unknown	English	Bengali	
The Jerry Springer Show	Unknown	US	9/20/1991-Current	1/2012-6/2013	English	Punjabi	Aired on BIG CBS Spark Punjabi as "Jerry Di Adalat." (Punjabi: ਜੇਰ੍ਰੀ ਦੀ ਅਦਾਲਤ) It officially premiered over 20 years after the original U.S. airdate.
The Mystic Knights of Tir Na Nog	Unknown	US; Ireland	9/7/1998- 5/7/1999	2006	English	Hindi	
The Three Stooges	Unknown	US	5/5/1934-2/5/1970	Unknown	English	Bengali	
Ultraman	Unknown	Japan	7/17/1966- 4/9/1967	Unknown	Japanese	Hindi; Marathi; Gujarati; Bengali	Tokusatsu series.
Wizards of Waverly Place	Unknown	US	10/12/2007- 1/6/2012	5/5/2008-2012	English	Hindi	Aired on Disney Channel India.
Xena: Warrior Princess	Unknown	US; New Zealand	9/4/1995-6/18/2001	Unknown	English	Bengali	

== Clients ==
The following are some of the company's clients:

List of clients that this dubbing studio is partners with:

- Ashutosh Gowariker Production
- Yash Raj Films
- ETV Network
- Cartoon Network India
- Cartoon Network Pakistan
- Pogo
- Toonami Asia
- PVR Cinemas
- Crunchyroll
- Film Kraft
- Sagar Arts
- Universal Studios Inc.
- Universal Animation Studios
- Warner Bros. Pictures
- Warner Bros. Animation
- New Line Cinema
- MVP Entertainment
- PVR Pictures
- Star India
- Star TV Network
- Sony Entertainment Television India
- Zee TV
- Columbia Pictures
- Tristar Pictures
- Buena Vista International
- Sony Pictures Networks India
- BBC World Service
- Sony Pictures Entertainment
- Sony Pictures Television International
- Walt Disney Studios
- 20th Century Studios
- UTV Software Communications
- Fox Star Studios
- DQ Entertainment
- DreamWorks Pictures
- DreamWorks Animation
- Paramount Pictures
- Multivision Multimedia
- Metro Goldwyn Mayer
- Nickelodeon India
- Nickelodeon Pakistan
- Sonic-Nickelodeon
- Viacom 18
- Netflix
- Filmkraft Productions Pvt. Ltd
- PVR Cinemas

== List of voice actors ==
This is a list of voice actors that are currently employed for this dubbing studio and/or have contributed to films being dubbed by this studio, and the language that they use. Both Male artists and Female voice actors are listed.

=== Male voice actors ===
Name	Birthdate	Birthplace	Languages spoken	Notes
Abbas R. Khandwawala	6 May 1995	Mumbai, India	English; Hindi	
Abhishek Bakshi	16 October 1992	India	English; Hindi	
Abhishek Mahajan		India	English; Hindi	
Abhishek Singh		India	English; Hindi	
Aditya Raj	27 June	India	English; Hindi	
Aditya Raj Sharma		India	English; Hindi; Punjabi	
Aditya Rai	19 July 2005	Mumbai, India	English; Hindi	
Aditya Roy Kapur	16 November 1985	India	English; Hindi	
Aekansh Vats	12 February 1993	Mumbai, India	English; French; Hindi; Tamil; Punjabi	
Ajit Jagtap		India	Hindi	
Akshay Kumar	9 September 1967	Amritsar, Punjab, India	English; Hindi	
Amar Babaria	10 May 1975	Mumbai, India	Hindi	
Amit Diondyi	28 June 1985	Mumbai, India	English; Hindi	
Amit Wadhwa		Mumbai, India	English; Hindi; Punjabi; Urdu	
Analesh Desai	19 November 1986	Mumbai, India	English; Hindi; Marathi	
Anil Datt		India	English; Hindi	
Anil Mani		India	English; Hindi	
Anil Nagrath	18 March 1954	India	English; Hindi	
Anil Saxena		Maharashtra, Mumbai, India	Hindi	
Ankur Javeri		Mumbai, India	English; Hindi	
Ankur Sharma	17 July 1982	Mumbai, India	English; Hindi	
Ankush Baruah	14 May 1989	Mumbai, India	English; Hindi	
Anup Shukla	25 December 1969	India	English; Hindi	TV Actor and anchor.
Anuraag Sharrma	19 July 1959	India	English; Hindi; Punjabi; Bengali; Oriya	
Ashar Sheikh		India	English; Hindi	
Ashish Bhatia	17 June 1982	Mumbai, India	English; Hindi	
Atul Kapoor	28 December 1966	Mumbai, Maharashtra, India	English; Hindi	
Atul Kulkarni	11 November 1989	Mumbai, Maharashtra, India	English; Hindi	
Ashutosh Lobo Gajiwala	17 May 1993	India	English; Hindi	
Baldev Trehan	22 April 1933	Bhayandar West, Mumbai, India	English; Hindi	Actor and dubbing artist.
Balvinder Kaur	Unknown	Mumbai, India	English; Hindi	
Barun Sobti	21 August 1984	Maharashtra, Mumbai, India	English; Hindi	
Benny Matthews	27 August	India	English; Hindi	
Bhanu		India	Telugu	
Bharat Bhatia		India	Hindi	
Brij Bjushan Sahaney		Andheri West, Mumbai	English; Hindi	
Chand Dhar		India	Hindi	
Chander Mohan Khanna	27 January 1952	India	English; Hindi	
Chetanya Adib	10 November 1971	Mumbai, India	English; Hindi	
Damandeep Singh Baggan	8 June 1977	Patiala, Punjab India	English; Hindi; Urdu	
Debashish Ghosh		Mumbai, India	Hindi	
Deepak Khushalani	18 July 1990	Mumbai, India	English; Hindi; Marathi	
Deepak Sinha	1 September 1958	Mumbai, India	English; Hindi	
Devarsh Thakur	10 October 1992	India	English; Hindi	
Dilip Sinha	1951	Patna, Bihar, India	Hindi; Bhojpuri	
Dinesh Kaushik	27 May 1957	Bathinda, Punjab, India	English; Hindi; Punjabi	
Feroz Khan †	25 September 1939 – 27 April 2009	Karnataka, India	English; Hindi; Urdu	
Firoz Chowdary		India	English; Hindi; Urdu	
Gippy Grewal	2 January 1983	Kum Kalan, Ludhiana, Punjab, India	English; Punjabi	Indian actor and singer, known for his Punjabi songs.
Girish Tejwani	14 April 1985	Pune, India	English; Hindi; Punjabi	
Gurmeet Singh Bedi	15 August 1964	Mumbai, Maharashtra, India	English; Hindi	
Harshad Rane	25 September 1989	Mumbai, India	English; Hindi	
Harsh Pawar		Mumbai, Maharashtra, India	Hindi	
Hitesh Sharda		Mumbai, Maharashtra, India	Hindi	
Jeetendra Dasadia		Mumbai, Maharashtra, India	English; Hindi	
K. Sabarinathan		Chennai, Tamil Nadu, India	Tamil	
Kabir Bedi	16 January 1946	Punjab, India	English; Hindi; Punjabi	
Kalpesh Parekh		Mumbai, India	Hindi	
Kamal Singh	7 December 1975	Mumbai, Maharashtra, India	English; Hindi	
Kamat Krishnakumar	27 August 1938	Mumbai, Maharashtra, India	English; Hindi	
Kapil Sharma	2 April 1981	Maharashtra, Mumbai, India	English; Hindi	Not to be confused with the Indian actor born in 1979.
Karan Somyani	15 November 1989	Maharashtra, Mumbai, India	English; Hindi	
Karthik	13 September 1960	Chennai, Tamil Nadu, India	Tamil; Telugu	
Kashyap Parulekar	23 September 1983	Mumbai, India	English; Hindi	
Kishore Bhatt	2 March 1951	Mumbai, India	Hindi	
Kumar Pravesh		Mumbai, India	Hindi	
Kunal Pandit		Mumbai, India	Hindi	
M. Mythili Kiran		India	Telugu	
Mandar Chandwadkar	27 July 1976	India	Hindi; Urdu; Marathi	
Manish Wadhwa	23 April 1972	Mumbai, India	English; Hindi	
Manoj Pandey	16 December 1967	Varanasi, Punjab, India	English; Hindi; Punjabi; Urdu; Oriya	
Mayur Suvarna	11 February 1977	Mumbai, India	English; Hindi; Marathi	
Mayur Vyas	c. 1973–1974	Mumbai, India	English; Hindi	
Mickey Dhamejani	3 October 1992	Mumbai, India	English; Hindi	
Mohan Kapoor	27 October 1965	Mumbai, India	English; Hindi	
Mukesh Kumar	1 August 1985	Mumbai, India	English; Hindi	
Nachiket Dighe	11 November 1987	Mumbai, India	English; Hindi; Marathi	
Nandkishore Bhat		Bengaluru Area, India	English; Hindi	
Nikhil Kapoor		Mumbai, India	English; Hindi	
Ninad Kamat	30 November	Mumbai, India	Hindi	
Nirupama Karthik		Chennai, Tamil Nadu, India	Hindi	
Nishant Kumar	30 June 1988	Mumbai, India	English; Hindi	
Nitesh Haralkar	15 November 1973	Mumbai, India	English; Hindi	
Pankaj Kalra	Unknown	Mumbai, India	English; Hindi	He also contributed to Hindi dubs of foreign media by Sugar Mediaz. Brother of Pawan Kalra.
Paresh Mohinani	3 May 1994	Mumbai, India	English; Hindi; Punjabi	
Parminder Ghumman	Unknown	Jalandhar, Punjab, India	English; Hindi; Punjabi; Urdu; Orya	
Partap Sharma	Unknown	India	English; Hindi	Not to be confused with the deceased writer of the same name.
Pathy Aiyar	Unknown	India	English; Tamil	
Pawan Kalra	1 November 1972	Mumbai, India	English; Hindi	He also contributed to Hindi dubs of foreign media by Sugar Mediaz. Brother of Pankaj Kalra.
Pawan Khanna		Mumbai, India	Hindi	
Pawan Shukla		Santa cruz West, Hubli, India	Hindi	
Peter Leo		Mumbai, India	English; Hindi	
Prasad Barve	10 April 1981	Mumbai, India	English; Hindi; Marathi	
Prasad Phanse		Mumbai, India	English; Hindi; Marathi	
Preeti Nayar		Mumbai, India	English; Hindi	
Rahul Mulani		Mumbai, India	English; Hindi	
Rahul Nayer		Mumbai, India	English; Hindi	
Rahul Seth	29 October 1977	Lucknow, India	English; Hindi	
Rahul Sharma	24 November 1986	Dausa, Rajasthan, India	English; Hindi	
Raj Joshi		India	English; Hindi	
Rajat Sinha		India	English; Hindi	
Rajesh Gupta		Mumbai, India	English; Hindi	
Rajesh Jolly	20 August 1960	India	English; Hindi; Punjabi	
Rajesh Khattar	24 September 1966	Darjeeling, West Bengal, India	English; Hindi; Urdu; Punjabi	
Rajesh Khera	26 October 1968	India	Hindi	
Raju Shrestha	15 August 1966	Mumbai, India	English; Hindi	
Rakesh Hans	5 July 1967	Mumbai, India	English; Hindi	
Ramesh Bansal		Mumbai, India	English; Hindi	
Ramesh Tiwari		Mumbai, India	English; Hindi	
Ramkiran Chopra	27 June 1975	Mumbai, India	English; Hindi; Punjabi	
Ranvir Shorey	18 August 1972	Jalandhar, Punjab, India	English; Hindi; Urdu	
Romy Singh		Mumbai, India	English; Hindi	
Saahil Chadha	29 November 1967	Mumbai, India	English; Hindi	
Sabari		Chennai, Tamil Nadu, India	Tamil	
Sahil Vaid	24 September	India	English; Hindi	
Saket Khatri	11 October 1979	Mumbai, India	English; Hindi	
Samay Raj Thakkar	21 October 1966	Mumbai, India	Hindi	
Sameep Nanda		Mumbai, India	English; Hindi	
Sanjay Keni		Maharashtra, Mumbai, India	English; Hindi	
Sanjay Shukla		Maharashtra, Mumbai, India	English; Hindi; Marathi	
Sanjeev Tiwari		Mumbai, India	English; Hindi	
Sandeep Karnik		India	English; Hindi	
Sanket Mhatre		Mumbai, Aditya Hitkari, India	English; Hindi; Urdu	
Sardara Singh Randhawa	28 August 1933	Patna, Bihar, India	English; Hindi; Bhojpuri	
Satish Sharma	10 October 1972	Mumbai, India	English; Hindi	
Saumya Daan	2 March 1982	Mumbai, India	English; Hindi; Marathi; Bengali	
Shailendra Pandey		Gorakhpur, Uttar Pradesh, India	English; Hindi; Punjabi	
Shakti Singh	9 October 1955	India	Hindi	
Shanu Dev	28 October	India	English; Hindi	
Sharad Kelkar	7 October 1976	Gwalior, Madhya Pradesh, India	English; Hindi	
Shubhraj Bhat	29 July 1991	India	English; Hindi	
Shyam		India	Tamil	
Siddhanth Rao	3 May 2005	Mumbai, India	English; Hindi	
Sonu Nigam	30 July 1973	Faridabad, Haryana, India	Hindi; Kannada	
Srinivas Rao	Unknown	India	English; Hindi; Telugu	
Subrato Ghosh	13 June 1986	India	English; Hindi	Served as a director for some Hindi-dubbed foreign films for this studio from 2002 until 2012.
Sumeet Pathak	13 May 1972	Deli, India	English; Hindi	
Sunil Jha	4 July 1989	Mumbai, India	English; Hindi; Punjabi	
Suresh Oberoi	17 December 1946	Quetta, Pakistan	English; Hindi; Urdu	
Tej Pawar	3 June 1993	Mumbai, India	English; Hindi	
Triloksingh Danu	1 August 1993	Mumbai, India	English; Hindi	
Trilok Kapoor		Mumbai, India	Hindi	
Tirthankar Mitra	1993	India	English; Hindi	
Uday Sabnis	7 June 1959	Thane, Maharashtra, India	English; Hindi; Marathi	
Umesh G. Chodankar		India	English; Hindi	
Uplaksh Kochhar	31 December 1991	India	English; Hindi; Punjabi	
Vad Aditya Raj		India	English; Hindi	
Vaibhav Thakkar	8 May 1997	Maharashtra, Mumbai, India	English; Hindi	Son of Samay Raj Thakkar, who's also a voice actor.
Varun K. Toorkey	8 January 1990	Mumbai, Maharashtra, India	English; Hindi; Marathi	
Vijaykumar	15 January 1966	India	English; Hindi; Tamil	
Vikas Khailani	29 September 1991	Delhi, Mumbai, India	English; Hindi	
Vikas Kumar	14 April 1981	Mumbai, India	English; Hindi	
Vikram Suri	29 September 1989	Mumbai, India	English; Hindi	
Vikrant Chaturvedi	1 August 1970	Allahabad, India	Hindi	
Vinay Pathak	12 July 1968	Dhanbad, Bihar, India	English; Hindi	
Vinitha Sanjeev	Unknown	India	English; Hindi; Tamil	
Vinod Kulkarni	29 August 1967	Mumbai, India	English; Hindi; Marathi	
Vinod Kumar Kumawat	16 April 1979	Mumbai, India	English; Hindi	
Vipul Bhatt		India	English; Hindi	
Vipul Roy	30 August 1984	India	English; Hindi; Punjabi; Haryanvi	
Viraj Adhav	2 November	India	Hindi	
Vivek Oberoi	3 September 1976	Hyderabad, Andhra Pradesh, India	English; Hindi; Tamil; Telugu	
Vrajesh Hirjee	16 June 1971	London, England	English; Hindi; Gujarati	
Yash Narvekar	1 September 1984	Mumbai, India	English; Hindi	
Yatin Mehta	12 April 1994	India	English; Hindi	
Yogeshwaran Raghavan		India	English; Hindi; Tamil	
Yudhvir Dahiya	26 August 1983	India	English; Hindi	
Zarina Saman		India	English; Hindi	
Zia Ahmed		India	English; Hindi; Urdu; Bengali	Not to be confused with the cricketer of the same name.

=== Female voice actors ===
Name	Birthdate	Birthplace	Languages spoken	Notes
Aditi Thirani	Unknown	Mumbai, India	English; Hindi	
Aishwarya Tupe	2 August 1999	Pune, India	English; Hindi	
Ami Trivedi	15 July 1982	Mumbai, Maharashtra, India	Hindi; Gujarati	
Anagha Abhay Deo	1 April 1970	Mumbai, India	English; Hindi	
Anjali Tiwari	25 July 1979	India	English; Hindi	
Anju Jamwal		India	English; Hindi	
Asha Negi	23 August 1990	Dehradun, India	English; Hindi	
Balwinder Kaur		India	English; Hindi	
Barbie Ananya	12 December 1997	India	English; Hindi	
Beena Chohan	20 November 1951	Gujarat, India	Hindi; Punjabi; Marathi; Gujarati	
Bhoomi Khona	16 April 2006	Mumbai, India	English; Hindi	
Debashmita Datta	27 November 1989	India	English; Hindi	
Deepika Joshi-Shah †	1976-27 January 2012	Ajmer, Rajasthan, India	Hindi; Kannada; Marathi	Deepika has died from a car crash in Kuwait.
Devi Negi		India	Hindi	
Diksha Thakur	26 December 1987	India	English; Hindi; Marathi	
Gayatri Patil	10 January 2000	Mumbai, India	English; Hindi	
Geeta Khanna	20 December 1951	Mumbai, India	Hindi	
Hansika Motwani	9 August 1991	Mumbai, Maharashtra, India	Hindi; Tamil; Telugu; Kannada	
Isha Dube	4 December 2001	Mumbai, India	English; Hindi	
Isha Talwar	22 December 1987	Mumbai, Maharashtra, India	English; Hindi; Malayalam	
Kavita Vaid	20 August 1969	Mumbai, India	English; Hindi	
Kavitha Srinivasan	Unknown	India	English; Hindi	
Kumud Bappal	22 May 1985	Andheri, West Mumbai, India	English; Hindi	
Leela Roy Ghosh †	3 February 1948 – 11 May 2012	Mumbai, India	Hindi; Bengali; English; Marathi; Urdu	Also the founder and former president of this studio. She died on 11 May 2012.
Lovleen Mishra	21 June 1967	Punjab, India	English; Hindi; Punjabi	
Malavika Shivpuri		India	Hindi	
Manini De		India	Hindi	
Meena Nahta		Kher West, Mumbai, India	Hindi	
Meghana Erande	24 April 1981	Mumbai, India	English; Hindi; Marathi	
Menaka Lalwani	13 November 1979	Mumbai, India	English; Hindi	
Mona Ghosh Shetty	22 April 1978	Mumbai, India	Hindi; Bengali; English; Marathi; Urdu	Daughter of Leela Roy Ghosh, and current president of this studio.
Monica Khanna	7 August 1986	Maharashtra, Mumbai, India	English; Hindi	
Munisha Rajpal	1975	Mumbai, India	English; Hindi	Dubbing foreign films and writing scripts for Hindi dub translations of foreign films. Including scripts for Hindi dubs of Hollywood films.
Nameeta Dessai	28 June 1981	Mumbai, India	English; Hindi	
Namrata Sawhney		Mumbai, India	English; Hindi	She also contributed to Hindi dubs of foreign media by Sugar Mediaz.
Nandini Issar	11 January	India	English; Hindi	
Nandini Sharma		India	English; Hindi	
Neerja Chittaranjan		Mumbai, India	English; Hindi	Worked as a translator for foreign films such as Puss in Boots.
Neethu Danani		India	English; Hindi	
Neshma Chemburkar	14 July 1976	India	English; Hindi	Sometimes known as Neshma Mantri.
Neetu Pipari		India	English; Hindi	
Nikita Tailor	4 August 1999	Mumbai, India	English; Hindi	
Ovi Dixit	9 August 1999	Pune, India	English; Hindi	
Padma D		Chennai, Tamil Nadu, India	English; Hindi; Tamil; Telugu; Kannada; Punjabi	
Parignya Pandya Shah	9 November 1985	Mumbai, India	English; Hindi	
Pinky Rajput	20 January 1969	Mumbai, India	English; Hindi	She also contributed to Hindi dubs of foreign media by Visual Reality.
Pooja Punjabi		India	English; Hindi; Punjabi; Urdu	
Prachi Chaube		India	English; Hindi	
Prachi Save Saathi	21 March 1982	Mumbai, India	English; Hindi	
Pratibha Tiku Sharma	28 May	India	English; Hindi	
Princy Gupta		India	English; Hindi	
Priti Jeevan Kathpal	20 December 1989	India	Hindi	
Priya Adivarekar	19 April 1992	Mumbai, India	English; Hindi; Marathi	
Priyanka Misra	15 July 1982	India	English; Hindi	
Rakhee Sharma		India	English; Hindi	
Reema Debnath	13 November 1979	India	English; Hindi	
Reema Kadchhud	2 January 1991	India	English; Hindi	
Renu Sharda	11 April 1982	Mumbai, India	Hindi	
Richa Pallod	30 August 1980	India	English; Hindi	
Saloni Gupta	30 November 1979	India	English; Hindi	
Samriddhi Shukla		Mumbai, India	English; Hindi	
Sangeetha Aanand		India	English; Tamil	
Sayuri Haralkar	11 December 2001	Mumbai, India	English; Hindi	
Seema Mason		India	English; Hindi	
Seuli Sridhar		India	English; Bengali	
Shagufta Baig	3 April 1988	Thane, Mumbai, Maharashtra, India	English; Hindi; Urdu	
Shalini Kewalramani	Unknown	India	English; Hindi	
Shrenu Harishbhai Parikh	11 November 1989	Mumbai, India	Hindi	
Shikha Tiwari	21 February 1989	Mumbai, India	English; Hindi	
Shobhini Singh		Mumbai, India	Hindi	
Shruti Kapdi	Mumbai, India	English; Hindi		
Shruti Misra		Mumbai, India	English; Hindi	
Sonakshi Sinha	2 June 1987	Patna, Bihar, India	English; Hindi	
Sri Lakshmi		India	Telugu	
Sunidhi Chauhan	14 August 1983	New Delhi, India	English; Hindi; Tamil; Telugu; Kannada; Punjabi; Marathi; Bhojpuri; Gujarati; Bengali; Assamese	
Sunita Pandey	4 October 1992	India	English; Hindi	
Surabhi Anand		India	English; Hindi	
Surabhi Zaveri		India	English; Hindi	
Swapnil Samella		India	English; Hindi	
Tanuja Mehta		Mumbai, India	English; Hindi	
Tina Parekh		Jaipur Rajasthan, India	Hindi	
Toshi Sinha	27 December 1978	Mumbai, Maharashtra, India	English; Hindi	
Urmilla Chatterjee		Mumbai, India	English; Hindi; Bengali	
Urvi Ashar	1 May 1987	Mumbai, India	English; Hindi; Marathi	
Vaishali Sharma	Unknown	India	English; Hindi; Marathi	
Wasna Ahmed	13 August 1989	Kolkata, India	English; Hindi	

== See also ==
- Leela Roy Ghosh † – The Founder and Former President of the studio, who was also a dubbing artist and dubbing director herself, before her death.
- Mona Ghosh Shetty – The daughter of Leela, who is now current president of the studio and is also a dubbing artist.
- Dubbing (filmmaking)
- List of Indian dubbing artists
