= Leela Roy Ghosh =

Indian actress

- Born: 1947 or 1948
- Died: 11 May 2012 (aged 64); Mumbai, Maharashtra, India
- Other names: Leela Roy; Leela Ghosh
- Education: Utkal University
- Occupations: Actress; voice actress; director; theater artist
- Children: Mona Ghosh Shetty

Leela Roy Ghosh (1947 or 1948 – 11 May 2012) was an Indian actress who specialized in voice-dubbing. She dubbed in Hindi, Bengali, English, Marathi and Urdu languages. She was also a dubbing director. Her daughter, Mona Ghosh Shetty, is a voice actress and singer.

== Career ==
Ghosh was perhaps best known for being the founder and president of the dubbing studio Sound & Vision India, which is located in Andheri, Mumbai City. Her daughter Mona helped her out and they did businesses together for the company from the early 1990s until Leela's death. The company handles Indian voice-dubs (mostly Hindi) for movies that are made by Hollywood production houses such as Paramount Pictures, Universal Studios and Sony Pictures Entertainment. As of 2013, the dubbing studio has dubbed over more than 300 foreign films and over a thousand foreign TV programs.

== Death ==
On 11 May 2012, Ghosh died from complications of liver transplant surgery at the age of 64.

== Production staff ==
=== Dubbed content ===
==== Live action films ====
Film title	Staff role	Studio	Dub Language	Original Language	Original Year Release	Dub Year Release	Notes
The Chronicles of Narnia: The Voyage of the Dawn Treader	Dubbing Director	Sound & Vision India	Hindi	English	2010	2010	Leela directed the Hindi dub alongside Kalpesh Parekh. K. Sabarinathan and M. Mythili Kiran have directed the Tamil and Telugu dubs respectively.
