= Kalpesh Parekh =

Indian voice actor and dubbing directory

- कल्पेश पारेख
- Occupations: Voice actor, dubbing director

Kalpesh Parekh (Hindi: कल्पेश पारेख) is an Indian voice actor and dubbing director who specializes dubbing foreign content in his native language. He speaks English and Hindi as his native languages.

He has been known for directing Hindi dubs of foreign content at Sound & Vision India. Usually, with studio president and voice actress Mona Ghosh Shetty who is also a dubbing director. He also worked with the late Leela Roy Ghosh before she died in 2012.

== Dubbing roles ==
=== Animated films ===
Film title	Original voice	Character	Dub Language	Original Language	Original Year Release	Dub Year Release	Notes
Puss in Boots	Various	Additional Voices	Hindi	English	2011	2011	Hindi dub released theatrically and also for Home media releases and Television airings. He has done additional voices.

== Production staff ==
=== Live Action films ===
Film title	Staff role	Studio	Dub Language	Original Language	Original Year Release	Dub Year Release	Notes
The Chronicles of Narnia: The Voyage of the Dawn Treader	Dubbing Director	Sound & Vision India	Hindi	English	2010	2010	Kalpesh directed the Hindi dub alongside Leela Roy Ghosh. K. Sabarinathan and M. Mythili Kiran have directed the Tamil and Telugu dubs respectively.
Skyfall	Dubbing Director	Sound & Vision India	Hindi	English	2012	2012	This film was also dubbed into Tamil and Telugu by the same studio. Kalpesh directed the Hindi dub alongside Mona Ghosh Shetty. K. Sabarinathan and M. Mythili Kiran have directed the Tamil and Telugu dubs respectively.
Teenage Mutant Ninja Turtles	Dubbing Director	Sound & Vision India	Hindi	English	2014	2014	This film was also dubbed into Tamil and Telugu by the same studio. Kalpesh directed the Hindi dub alongside Mona Ghosh Shetty and she also Hindi dubbed for Megan Fox's character, April O' Neil. K. Sabarinathan and M. Mythili Kiran have directed the Tamil and Telugu dubs respectively.
Avengers: Age of Ultron Deadpool 2	Dubbing Director Dubbing Director	Sound & Vision India Vision India	Hindi Hindi	English English	2015 2018	2015 2018	This film was also dubbed into Tamil and Telugu by the same studio. Kalpesh directed the Hindi dub alongside Mona Ghosh Shetty. K. Sabarinathan and M. Mythili Kiran have directed the Tamil and Telugu dubs respectively. .
