= Mona Ghosh Shetty =

Indian Voice Actor

- Other names: Mona Shetty; Mona Ghosh
- Occupations: Voice actor; voice casting director; dubbing director; voice coach
- Years active: 1983–present
- Mother: Leela Roy Ghosh
- Website: soundandvisionindia.in

Mona Ghosh Shetty is an Indian dubbing artist and dubbing director. She has dubbed in Hindi, Bengali, English, Marathi, and Urdu language projects.

== Personal life ==
Mona Ghosh Shetty is the daughter of former dubbing artiste Leela Roy Ghosh. While she dubs for foreign roles into Hindi most of the time, she also performs her dubbing roles into English and Bengali. She runs a dubbing studio known as Sound & Vision India located in Andheri, Mumbai. She used to work with her mother who was the founder and president of the company before her death and they had set up the businesses together in the early 1990s. Her mother died on 11 May 2012.

== Dubbing career ==
Shetty started as a voice artist at the age of five. She dubs professionally in English, Hindi, Bengali, and Oriya. When an advertisement becomes popular, she is required to dub it in all 10 official regional languages: Tamil, Telugu, Kannada, Malayalam, Bengali, Gujarati, Punjabi, Marathi, Oriya, and Assamese. She has mentioned, "I don't know all the languages. There is always a supervisor who informs me about the nuances of the language and how it should be spoken." Her debut voice over film was Nirnayak (1997) and she dubbed for Indrani Banerjee. She specializes in dubbing for actresses who speak limited Hindi, even though the movies were already shot in Hindi. For over 15 years, she has provided Hindi dubbing for many leading female actors, including Cameron Diaz, Angelina Jolie, Kate Beckinsale, Kirsten Dunst, Halle Berry, Zoe Saldaña, Drew Barrymore, Catherine Zeta-Jones, Aruna Shields, Jacqueline Fernandez, Katrina Kaif, Deepika Padukone and other celebrities. Some of the actresses listed. She is still the approved Hindi dub-over voice artist for those actresses. Shetty also dubs for television commercials. She has recently given the Hindi voiceover for Galadriel for the American fantasy television series The Lord of the Rings: The Rings of Power.

== Filmography ==
=== Hindi films ===
| Film title | Character | Language | Year release | Notes |
|---|---|---|---|---|
| Samay | Namrata Sharma | Hindi | 2003 | Extended Cameo Appearance |

=== Animated series ===
| Program title | Role | Language | Episodes | Airdate | Notes |
|---|---|---|---|---|---|
| Little Krishna | Maa Yashoda | English | 13 | 5 November 2009 | |

=== Animated films ===
| Film title | Character | Language | Year release | Notes |
|---|---|---|---|---|
| Hanuman | Goddess Sita | Hindi | 2005 | |
| Veer Yodha Prithviraj Chauhan | Queen Samyukta | Hindi | 2008 | |

== Dubbing roles ==
=== Animated series ===
| Program title | Original voice | Character | Dub language | Original language | Number of episodes | Original airdate | Dubbed airdate | Notes |
|---|---|---|---|---|---|---|---|---|
| Sofia the First | Julie Nathanson | Belle | Hindi | English | 68 (dubbed 1) | 11/18/2012–Current | 2015–Current | Appeared in the episode "The Amulet and the Anthem" She also sang for the song "Karo Galat Sahi" (English: "Make It Right"). |

=== Live action films ===
==== Hindi films ====
| Year | Film title | Original actress | Character | Notes |
|---|---|---|---|---|
| 1998 | Jab Pyaar Kisise Hota Hai | Unknown | A boarding school principal who takes a pre-admission test of Kabir, a young boy. | |
| 1998 | Ghulam | Rani Mukerji | Alisha Mafatlal | |
| 1998 | Soldier | Preity Zinta | Preeti Singh | |
| 1998 | Dushman | Kajol | Sonia and Naina Sehgal | |
| 2000 | Kaho Naa... Pyaar Hai | Ameesha Patel | Sonia Saxena | |
| 2001 | Aamdani Atthanni Kharcha Rupaiya | Isha Koppikar | Anjali | |
| 2001 | Hum Ho Gaye Aapke | Reema Sen | Chandni Gupta | |
| 2001 | Kasoor | Divya Dutta | Payal Malhotra | |
| 2001 | Nayak: The Real Hero | Khyati Keswani | A women's college student who informs the one-day Chief Minister Shivaji Rao Gaekwad about eve teasing in the college. | |
| 2002 | Raaz | Bipasha Basu | Sanjana Dhanraj | |
| 2003 | Andaaz | Lara Dutta | Kajal | The filmmakers wanted Lara Dutta's character to have a high-pitched voice. |
| 2003 | Jism | Bipasha Basu | Sonia Khanna | |
| 2004 | Ab Tumhare Hawale Watan Sathiyo | Divya Khosla | Shweta Bhansali Singh | |
| 2005 | Sarkar | Katrina Kaif | Pooja Chauhan | |
| 2005 | Taj Mahal: An Eternal Love Story | Sonya Jehan | Mumtaz Mahal | |
| 2005 | Kisna: The Warrior Poet | Isha Sharvani | Lakshmi Devi | |
| 2005 | Ek Khiladi Ek Haseena | Koena Mitra | Natasha Kapoor | |
| 2005 | Water | Lisa Ray | Kalyani | |
| 2005 | Maine Pyaar Kyun Kiya? | Katrina Kaif | Sonia Bhardwaj | |
| 2006 | Apna Sapna Money Money | Koena Mitra | Julie Fernandez | |
| 2006 | Dhoom 2 | Rimi Sen | Sweety J. Dixit | |
| 2006 | Kabhi Alvida Naa Kehna | Rani Mukerji | Maya Talwar | |
| 2006 | Humko Deewana Kar Gaye | Katrina Kaif | Jia A. Yashvardhan | |
| 2006 | Chup Chup Ke | Sushama Reddy | Pooja Rao | |
| 2007 | Raqeeb | Tanushree Dutta | Sophie Matthews | |
| 2007 | Welcome | Katrina Kaif | Sanjana S. Shetty | |
| 2007 | Om Shanti Om | Deepika Padukone | Shantipriya and Sandhya | |
| 2007 | Partner | Katrina Kaif | Priya R. Jaisingh | |
| 2008 | Deshdrohi | Hrishitaa Bhatt | Neha R. Raghav | |
| 2008 | Hello | Katrina Kaif | Angel | |
| 2008 | Rab Ne Bana Di Jodi | Anushka Sharma | Taani Sahni | |
| 2008 | Yuvvraaj | Katrina Kaif | Anushka "Anu" Banton | |
| 2008 | Kismat Konnection | Vidya Balan | Priya Saluja | |
| 2009 | Love Aaj Kal | Giselli Monteiro | Harleen Kaur | |
| 2009 | Aladin | Jacqueline Fernandez | Jasmine | |
| 2009 | De Dana Dan | Katrina Kaif | Anjali Kakkar | |
| 2010 | Prince | Aruna Shields | Maya | |
| 2010 | Mr. Singh Mrs. Mehta | Aruna Shields | Neera Singh | |
| 2010 | We Are Family | Kajol | Maya | |
| 2011 | Murder 2 | Jacqueline Fernandez | Priya | |
| 2011 | Bodyguard | Kareena Kapoor | Divya S. Rana | |
| 2011 | Rockstar | Nargis Fakhri | Heer Kaul | |
| 2012 | Housefull 2 | Jacqueline Fernandez | Bobby Kapoor Mehrotkar | |
| 2012 | Jannat 2 | Esha Gupta | Dr. Janhvi Singh Tomar | |
| 2012 | Student of the Year | Alia Bhatt | Shanaya Singhania | |
| 2013 | Race 2 | Jacqueline Fernandez | Omisha | |
| 2016 | Banjo | Nargis Fakhri | Christina a.k.a. Chris | |
| 2019 | Amavas | Nargis Fakhri | Ahana | |
| 2021 | Sooryavanshi | Katrina Kaif | Ria Sooryavanshi | |
| 2025 | Chhaava | Rashmika Mandanna | Yesubai Bhonsale | |

==== English Language Films ====
| Year | Film title | Original actress | Character | Dub language | Original language | Notes |
|---|---|---|---|---|---|---|
| 1998 | The Mask of Zorro | Catherine Zeta-Jones | Elena Montero | Hindi | English | |
| 2000 | Charlie's Angels | Cameron Diaz | Natalie Cook | Hindi | English | |
| 2000 | Charlie's Angels | Drew Barrymore | Dylan Sanders | Hindi | English | |
| 2001 | Lara Croft: Tomb Raider | Angelina Jolie | Lara Croft | Hindi | English | |
| 2001 | Swordfish | Halle Berry | Ginger Knowles | Hindi | English | |
| 2002 | Mr. and Mrs. Iyer | Herself | English Newsreader | Hindi | English | A Minor Voice Over in the Opening of the Film. |
| 2002 | Stuart Little 2 | Melanie Griffith | Margalo (voice) | Hindi | English | |
| 2002 | Spider-Man | Kirsten Dunst | Mary Jane Watson | Hindi | English | |
| 2002 | Resident Evil | Milla Jovovich | Alice | Hindi | English | |
| 2003 | The Matrix Reloaded | Carrie-Anne Moss | Trinity | Hindi | English | |
| 2003 | The Matrix Revolutions | Carrie-Anne Moss | Trinity | Hindi | English | |
| 2003 | X-Men 2 | Halle Berry | Ororo Munroe/Storm | Hindi | English | |
| 2003 | Charlie's Angels: Full Throttle | Cameron Diaz; Drew Barrymore | Natalie Cook; Dylan Sanders | Hindi | English | |
| 2003 | Lara Croft: Tomb Raider – The Cradle of Life | Angelina Jolie | Lara Croft | Hindi | English | |
| 2003 | The Last Samurai | Koyuki | Taka | Hindi | English | |
| 2004 | Spider-Man 2 | Kirsten Dunst | Mary Jane Watson | Hindi | English | |
| 2004 | Eternal Sunshine of the Spotless Mind | Kirsten Dunst | Mary Svevo | Hindi | English | |
| 2004 | Elizabethtown | Kirsten Dunst | Claire Colburn | Hindi | English | |
| 2004 | The Day After Tomorrow | Emmy Rossum | Laura Chapman | Hindi | English | |
| 2004 | Anacondas: The Hunt for the Blood Orchid | KaDee Strickland | Samantha Rogers | Hindi | English | |
| 2004 | Resident Evil: Apocalypse | Milla Jovovich | Alice | Hindi | English | |
| 2004 | Hellboy | Selma Blair | Liz Sherman | Hindi | English | |
| 2005 | Sky High | Mary Elizabeth Winstead | Gwendolyn "Gwen" Grayson / Royal Pain / Sue Tenny | Hindi | English | Aired by Disney. |
| 2005 | King Kong | Naomi Watts | Ann Darrow | Hindi | English | |
| 2006 | Mission: Impossible III | Michelle Monaghan | Julia | Hindi | English | |
| 2006 | Pirates of the Caribbean: Dead Man's Chest | Keira Knightley | Elizabeth Swann | Hindi | English | |
| 2007 | Ghost Rider | Eva Mendes | Roxanne Simpson | Hindi | English | |
| 2007 | Transformers | Megan Fox | Mikaela Banes | Hindi | English | |
| 2007 | Pirates of the Caribbean: At World's End | Keira Knightley | Elizabeth Swann | Hindi | English | |
| 2008 | Wanted | Angelina Jolie | Fox | Hindi | English | |
| 2008 | You Don't Mess with the Zohan | Emmanuelle Chriqui | Dalia Hakbarah | Hindi | English | |
| 2009 | Transformers: Revenge of the Fallen | Megan Fox | Mikaela Banes | Hindi | English | |
| 2009 | Avatar | Zoe Saldaña | Neytiri | Hindi | English | |
| 2010 | Prince of Persia: The Sands of Time | Gemma Arterton | Princess Tamina | Hindi | English | |
| 2011 | Mission: Impossible – Ghost Protocol | Paula Patton | Jane Carter | Hindi | English | |
| 2011 | Pirates of the Caribbean: On Stranger Tides | Penélope Cruz | Angelica | Hindi | English | |
| 2012 | John Carter | Lynn Collins | Dejah Thoris | Hindi | English | |
| 2012 | Skyfall | Bérénice Marlohe | Sévérine | Hindi | English | Shetty (credited as Mona Shetty) was mentioned on the Hindi dub credits of the DVD release of the film, also containing the Tamil, Telugu, Russian and Ukrainian credits. She also served as a dubbing director of the Hindi dub, alongside Kalpesh Parekh. |
| 2012 | Total Recall | Kate Beckinsale | Lori Quaid | Hindi | English | |
| 2014 | Dawn of the Planet of the Apes | Keri Russell | Ellie | Hindi | English | |
| 2014 | Captain America: The Winter Soldier | Cobie Smulders | Maria Hill | Hindi | English | |
| 2014 | Guardians of the Galaxy | Zoe Saldaña | Gamora | Hindi | English | |
| 2014 | Teenage Mutant Ninja Turtles | Megan Fox | April O'Neil | Hindi | English | |
| 2016 | Teenage Mutant Ninja Turtles: Out of the Shadows | Megan Fox | April O'Neil | Hindi | English | |
| 2015 | Avengers: Age of Ultron | Cobie Smulders | Maria Hill | Hindi | English | |
| 2019 | Dumbo | Eva Green | Colette Marchant | Hindi | English | |

==== Tamil and Telugu language films ====
| Film title | Original voice | Character | Dub language | Original language | Original year release | Dubbed year release | Notes |
|---|---|---|---|---|---|---|---|
| Azad | Shilpa Shetty | Mahalaxmi | Hindi | Telugu | 2000 | 2000 | |
| Kochadaiiyaan | Deepika Padukone | Princess Vandana | Hindi | Tamil | 2014 | 2014 | |
| Sye Raa Narasimha Reddy | Nayanthara | Sidhamma | Hindi | Telugu | 2019 | 2019 | |

=== Animated films ===
| Film title | Character | Original voice | Dub language | Original language | Original year release | Dub year Release | Notes |
|---|---|---|---|---|---|---|---|
| Beauty and the Beast | Belle | Paige O'Hara | Hindi | English | 1991 | 2009 | Aired on TV, dubbed in Hindi. Shetty only provided the speaking voice for this character, in the Hindi dub. The singing Hindi voice was provided by Mimosa Pinto. |
| Beauty and the Beast: The Enchanted Christmas | Belle | Paige O'Hara | Hindi | English | 1997 | 2009 | Shetty only provided the speaking voice for this character, in the Hindi dub. The singing Hindi voice was provided by Mimosa Pinto. |
| Belle's Magical World | Belle | Paige O'Hara | Hindi | English | 1998 | 2009 | Shetty only provided the speaking voice for this character, in the Hindi dub. The singing Hindi voice was provided by Mimosa Pinto. |
| Toy Story 3 | Barbie | Jodi Benson | Hindi | English | 2010 | 2010 | |
| Puss in Boots | Kitty Softpaws | Salma Hayek | Hindi | English | 2011 | 2011 | Hindi dub released in theatrically and on Home media releases. Her credit name for the role of Kitty was credited as: "Mona Shetty". |
| Planes | Ishani | Priyanka Chopra | Hindi | English | 2013 | 2015 | |
| The Angry Birds Movie | Maya Rudolph | Matilda | Hindi | English | 2016 | 2016 | |
| Finding Dory | Dory | Ellen DeGeneres | Bengali | English | 2016 | 2017 | Aired on Star Jalsha on 15 October 2017 |

== Production staff ==
=== Live action films ===
| Film title | Staff role | Studio | Dub language | Original language | Original year release | Dub year release | Notes |
|---|---|---|---|---|---|---|---|
| Skyfall | Dubbing director | Sound & Vision India | Hindi | English | 2012 | 2012 | This film was also dubbed into Tamil and Telugu by the same studio. Shetty directed the Hindi dub. |
| Iron Man 3 | Dubbing director | Sound & Vision India | Hindi | English | 2013 | 2013 | This film was also dubbed into Tamil and Telugu by the same studio. Shetty directed the Hindi dub alongside Kalpesh Parekh. |
| Avengers: Age of Ultron | Dubbing director | Sound & Vision India | Hindi | English | 2015 | 2015 | This film was also dubbed into Tamil and Telugu by the same studio. Shetty directed the Hindi dub alongside Kalpesh Parekh. |
| Jurassic World | Dubbing director | Sound & Vision India | Hindi | English | 2015 | 2015 | This film was also dubbed into Tamil and Telugu by the same studio. Shetty directed the Hindi dub alongside Kalpesh Parekh. |

== See also ==
- List of Indian dubbing artists
