= Sitadevi =

Sita Devi
- Theatrical release poster
- Directed by: Eranki Sharma
- Produced by: T Raman
- Starring: Chiranjeevi
- Music by: M.S.Viswanathan
- Production company: Bhumi chitra films
- Release date: 1982
- Country: India
- Language: Telugu

Seetha Devi is a 1982 Telugu film starring Chiranjeevi, Sujatha, Satyendra Kumar, Rallapalli, Hari Babu, Dubbing Janaki, P. L. Narayana, Vankayala Satyanarayana. The film directed by Eranki Sarm and music was by MS Viswanathan was produced by Chakravarthy.

== Plot ==
The story revolves around brother (Chiranjeevi) and sister (Sujatha). Sujatha falls from a swing in her childhood and her right hand gets paralyzed. A police officer (Satyendra Kumar) who becomes a widower marries Sujatha despite her being handicapped. For the sake of Sujatha's marriage Chiranjeevi indulges in petty thefts influenced by Rallapalli. On the day of marriage Chiranjeevi is arrested by the police. Sujatha's husband dumps her because her brother Chiranjeevi is a thief.

Sujatha goes through hardships before uniting with her husband.

== Cast ==
- Chiranjeevi
- Sujatha
- Haribabu
- Rallapalli
- Rajani
- Dubbing Janaki
- Jayasri
- Satyendra Kumar
- P. L. Narayana
- Vankayala Satyanarayana
