= Kangna (song) =

Punjabi song by Dr Zeus

Song by Dr Zeus, Master Rakesh, Shortie, Deepti

from the album Unda Da Influence
- Released: 2003
- Label: Dr Zeus Worldwide

"Kangna" is a Punjabi song by British producer Dr Zeus, featuring Master Rakesh, Shortie, and Deepti. Released in 2003 as part of the album Unda Da Influence by Envy Music, it was voted the Best Song on BBC Asian Network in 2003. It was later recreated for the 2012 Bollywood film Chaar Din Ki Chandni. The song is recognized for its influence in the UK Bhangra scene.

== Background and release ==
"Kangna" was recorded at Dr Zeus’s BFK Studio and released in 2003 on the album Unda Da Influence.

Composed by Dr Zeus, it features vocals by Master Rakesh (Avtar Singh Safri), Shortie (Little Lox), and Deepti, with additional vocals by Sai Priya in the acoustic mix. The song, with a duration of 3:30, blends traditional Punjabi Bhangra with modern production, contributing to the global rise of the genre. It was re-released in 2020 by Dr Zeus Worldwide.

== Awards ==
In 2003, "Kangna" won the BBC Asian Network Best Song award, recognizing its impact in the British Asian music scene.

== Reception ==
"Kangna" was praised for its energetic rhythm and danceable tone (BPM 102, D♭ Minor key), becoming a staple in UK Bhangra clubs. It achieved streaming success across platforms like Spotify, Apple Music, and YouTube.

Recreation

In 2012, "Kangna Tera Ni" was recreated for the Bollywood film Chaar Din Ki Chandni, directed by Samir Karnik and starring Tusshar Kapoor and Kulraj Randhawa. The recreated version, sung by Dr Zeus with music composed by Lumber, was released as part of the film’s soundtrack by T-Series. The song retained elements of the original 2003 track’s Bhangra style, adapted for the romantic comedy’s narrative, and was featured in promotional materials for the film.

== Controversy ==
In 2019, Dr Zeus publicly criticized the makers of Bala for using "Kangna" and "Don't Be Shy" without permission. In a tweet, he accused Bala's producers, Maddock Films, and composers, including Badshah and Sachin–Jigar, of unauthorized use and threatened legal action. Maddock Films responded, stating that Karman Entertainment, the rights holder for "Don't Be Shy," had granted a license for its recreation in Bala, starring Ayushmann Khurrana, Bhumi Pednekar, and Yami Gautam. The recreated song's video, released on October 18, 2019, gained significant online attention, with promotional banter between Badshah and Khurrana. The controversy over "Kangna"'s use remained unresolved in public discussions.

== Personnel ==
- Dr Zeus (Baljit Singh Padam): Composer, producer
- Master Rakesh (Avtar Singh Safri): Vocals
- Shortie (Little Lox): Vocals
- Deepti: Vocals
- Sai Priya: Vocals (acoustic mix)
