= Jaane Bhi Do Yaaron =

Jaane Bhi Do Yaaron (lit. 'Let It Go Friends') may refer to:

- Jaane Bhi Do Yaaro, a 1983 Indian Hindi-language satirical black comedy film
- Jaane Bhi Do Yaaron (2007 film), a 2007 Indian film Hindi-language film
