= Nanhe Jaisalmer =

Nanhe Jaisalmer - A Dream Come True
- Movie poster for Nanhe Jaisalmer
- Directed by: Samir Karnik
- Written by: Samir Karnik
- Starring: Bobby Deol; Dwij Yadav
- Cinematography: Binod Pradhan
- Edited by: Sanjay Sankla
- Music by: Score: Monty Sharma; Songs: Himesh Reshammiya
- Distributed by: Eros International
- Release date: 14 September 2007
- Running time: 115 min
- Country: India
- Language: Hindi

Nanhe Jaisalmer - A Dream Come True (also known as Nanhe) is a 2007 Indian Hindi-language drama film directed by Samir Karnik starring Bobby Deol as himself and child actor Dwij Yadav in the title role. The film has a new actor, who has appeared in a couple of films, The film is based in Rajasthan.

== Synopsis ==
Nanhe is the self-proclaimed camel jockey in the whole of Jaisalmer. Only ten years old, he can speak a myriad of languages and has won the hearts of all the tourists who visit Jaisalmer. But in Nanhe's heart is his favorite actor, Bobby Deol, who had worked with him in a film years ago when Nanhe was just a baby. In one of that film's scenes, Bobby picks up the baby Nanhe and asks him, 'Kaise ho mere dost?' (How are you, my friend?). This memory alone leads Nanhe to believe that the actor is his long-lost best friend. No one believes that Bobby is Nanhe's friend. When it is announced that Bobby is finally coming to Jaisalmer on a 30-day movie shoot, Nanhe's wish is fulfilled, to finally meet his long-lost friend. Over the next few days, Bobby and Nanhe enjoy much time together. Bobby teaches Nanhe how to use his most powerful utility, his brain, and how to keep on learning new things in life.

It is not long before Nanhe finds out that Bobby never came to Jaisalmer; he cancelled his shooting. Nanhe had been hallucinating Bobby the whole time. His subconscious had been healing him into learning good things and leaving bad habits such as taking tobacco. He realizes that each time he saw Bobby, he was in a get-up that came right out of all the posters in Nanhe's room.

Years later, an adult Nanhe changes his name to Vikram Singh and writes a book about his own life and about how he thought he met Bobby and other events that happened in his earlier life, but he is shocked when he finds out that on his book's premiere, Bobby actually shows up to congratulate him. Reminiscing all the past events, they became good friends after all.

== Cast ==
- Dwij Yadav as Nanhe Jaisalmer
- Bobby Deol as Himself
- Sharat Saxena as Khemaji
- Vivek Shauq as Jassuji
- Rajesh Vivek as Dhurjan Singh
- Vatsal Sheth as Adult Nanhe/Vikram Singh (cameo)
- Beena Kak as Teacher Ma'am
- Sunny Deol as Himself (uncredited)
- Prateeksha Lonkar as Nanhe's mother
- Rushita Singh as Nanhe's sister
- Karan Arora as Maggu
- Rajveer Shing as Raja Shab
- Amit Khanna as Bobby Deol Driver

== Soundtrack ==
Nanhe Jaisalmer

Soundtrack album by Himesh Reshammiya
- Released: 2007
- Recorded: 2007
- Genre: Feature film soundtrack
- Language: Hindi
- Label: Eros Music
- Director: Himesh Reshammiya
- Producer: Himesh Reshammiya

Himesh Reshammiya chronology
Darling (2007)	Nanhe Jaisalmer (2007)	Welcome (2007)

1. "Ai Mere Nanhe - Sonu Nigam
2. "O Raanjhana" - Himesh Reshammiya
3. "Kesariya Baalama" - Vineet, Jayesh Kumar
4. "Lamha Lamha Pal Pal Jaana" - Himesh Reshammiya, Sunidhi Chauhan
5. "Ulfat Ulfat Jaana Meree Too" - Himesh Reshammiya

== Critical response ==
Sukanya Verma of Rediff.com gave the film three stars out of five, "Thankfully, the humour of Nanhe Jaisalmer is squeaky clean compelling the supporting cast comprising of actors like Rajesh Vivek, Sharat Saxena, Pratiksha Lonkar, and Bina Kak to be at their endearing best. Though never really lengthy, the only time Nanhe Jaisalmer truly tests your patience is when Himesh Reshammiya's insipid tracks show up. Surprisingly, the catchy-song machine fails to deliver for this kiddie flick. Nanhe Jaisalmer might not be a big bait at the box office. Then again, its true credibility lies in its purpose not profit." Manish Gajjar of BBC.com wrote "Without a shadow of doubt, young talented Dwij is the main star as the adorable Nanhe. He portrays the stubbornness and vulnerability of the ten year old character with great confidence and real pride. Bobby Deol gives a subdued performance as Nanhe's idol although another actor like Salman Khan or Hrithik Roshan would be better suited for this role. This is mainly due to their strong screen presence and megastar status. On the whole, Nanhe Jaisalmer is a pure fantasy film - a children's delight this autumn."

Conversely, Taran Adarsh of Bollywood Hungama gave the film 1.5 stars out of 5, writing "NANHE JAISALMER belongs to Dwij Yadav. His performance can be rightly described in one word -- magnificent. He's adorable and supremely talented. So good is this wonder kid that all actors in NANHE JAISALMER pale in comparison. A matchless performance! Bobby is a complete miscast. The role demanded a hugely popular star, someone like SRK, Salman, Aamir, Hrithik or Akshay. Had it been a superstar enacting the character, the identification with it would've been immense then. The viewer knows that Bobby is not in the top bracket and that's why this character appears fake. Pratiksha Lonkar and Bina Kak are competent. Sharat Saxena, Vivek Shauq and Rajesh Vivek are passable. Vatsal Sheth is wooden. On the whole, NANHE JAISALMER has been made with noble intentions, but will find very few takers. At the box-office, it's a non-starter. The Times of India gave the film 2 stars out of 5, writing "The film has a positive message: heroes can actually have a positive effect on a fan's life. And the director tries hard to give the story a twist in the end. Even some of the performances are lively and watchable, specially Sharat Saxena as the village drunk. Bobby too seems somewhat inspired by the novelty of the script. But all said and done, the film ends up as a docu-drama on literacy. Where's the entertainment quotient? Khalid Mohammed writing for the Hindustan Times gave the film 2 stars, writing "Bottomline: this odd enterprise is neither a children's film nor an entertainer for spectators of all ages. It's not worth losing your pressure cooker for its bizarre Booker." Aprajita Anil of The Indian Express gave the film 2 stars, writing "Director Sameer Karnik deserves a pat on his back for more than one reason. First, for growing out of his no-sense approach that was glaring in his directorial debut, Kyon Ho Gaya Na. And second, for making such a noble effort to churn out a soothingly different script. But not all goes well. At least not for too long."
