= Phillum City =

- Directed by: Deven Khote
- Written by: Sharat Katariya
- Produced by: Ronnie Screwvala
- Starring: John Abraham; Amruta Khanvilkar; Namit Das; Dwij Yadav; Amit Mistry; Kavita Kaushik
- Cinematography: Mahesh Aney
- Edited by: Aarif Sheikh
- Music by: Ram Sampath
- Distributed by: UTV Motion Pictures; IBC Motion Pictures
- Release date: 12 March 2010 (Unreleased)
- Country: India
- Language: Hindi

Phillum City (pronounced [ˈpʰɪlɪm ˈsɪʈi]; transl. Film City) is an unreleased Indian Hindi-language comedy drama film directed by Deven Khote and starring John Abraham, Amruta Khanvilkar, Kavita Kaushik, Namit Das, Manas Adhiya and Dwij Yadav. It was initially slated for release on 12 March and then 8 October 2010, though it remained unreleased due to undisclosed reasons.

== Cast ==
- John Abraham as himself
- Amruta Khanvilkar as Malti
- Namit Das as Chaubey
- Dwij Yadav as Satyanarayan
- Sanjay Tripathi as Kaushal
- Amit Mistry as Raju
- Kavita Kaushik as Kalyani
- Manas Adhiya as Harry
- Jaywant Wadkar as Vitthal
- Rajesh Khera as Chandan
- Amitosh Nagpal as Casio
- Shaikh Sami as Pandit Ji
- Vikas Varma as Parmeet
- Vikraal Vij as Mangal
