= Full Tension =

- Genre: Comedy
- Created by: Jaspal Bhatti
- Written by: Jaspal Bhatti
- Directed by: Jaspal Bhatti
- Starring: Jaspal Bhatti; Vivek Shauq; Savita Bhatti; B. N. Sharma; Rajesh Jolly; Kuldeep Sharma; Brijesh Ahuja; Sunil Grover
- Country of origin: India
- Original language: Hindi
- No. of seasons: 1
- No. of episodes: 15

Production
- Producer: Savita Bhatti
- Editor: Vishnu Malhotra
- Camera setup: Multi-camera
- Running time: Approx. 25 minutes

Original release
- Network: DD National
- Release: 1995

Full Tension is a satirical comedy show which aired on DD National.

== Cast ==
- Jaspal Bhatti
- Vivek Shauq
- Savita Bhatti
- B. N. Sharma
- Rajesh Jolly
- Kuldeep Sharma
- Brijesh Ahuja
- Sunil Grover
- Ashwani Bhardwaj
- Prem Kakaria

== Episodes ==
1. Gifts
2. Services and Repairs
3. Hotels and Restaurants
4. Politics
5. Money Matters
6. Law and Order
7. Kitty Party
8. Media
9. Transportation
10. Alcoholism
11. Health
12. Rainy Season
13. Unemployment
14. Beggars
15. Education
