= Flop Show =

1989 Indian television sitcom

- Genre: Comedy
- Created by: Jaspal Bhatti
- Written by: Jaspal Bhatti
- Directed by: Jaspal Bhatti
- Starring: Jaspal Bhatti; Vivek Shauq; Savita Bhatti; Rajesh Jolly; B. N. Sharma; Kuldeep Sharma
- Country of origin: India
- Original language: Hindi
- No. of seasons: 1
- No. of episodes: 10

Production
- Producer: Savita Bhatti
- Editor: Vishnu Malhotra
- Camera setup: Multi-camera
- Running time: Approx. 25 minutes

Original release
- Network: DD National
- Release: 31 October 1991

Flop Show is an Indian television sitcom that first aired on DD National in 1989. The show was written and directed by satirical humorist Jaspal Bhatti, who also played himself as the main character. His wife Savita Bhatti produced the show and also acted in all the episodes as his wife. The sitcom was a satire on the socio-cultural problems faced by a common Indian at the time. Only 10 episodes of the show were produced.

The show was again telecast on DD National from 19 May 2020 during the lockdown due to coronavirus.

== Overview ==
Flop Show has a distinctive opening sequence. It starts off with a dedication to those whom the specific episode is poking fun at. This is followed by the title song "Flop Show", which mocks the show itself as being misdirected. It features most of the main cast collectively playing musical instruments as a band. H. N. Singh appears as an eye-patch wearing, menacing looking director. The other cast members are dressed variously as a police inspector, a doctor, a peon, etc.

The show was shot completely in Chandigarh with some episodes being shot at Punjab Engineering College (Jaspal Bhatti is an alumnus of that college). The cast remained the same in every episode, although they played different characters as each episode essayed a different story.

Another distinctive aspect of the show is a joke in between the casting credits at the beginning and a satirically reworded popular Hindi film song played at the end of every episode, in the form of a Parody.

== Episodes ==
Following is the complete list of episodes:

| Episode | Title | Jaspal Bhatti's Role | Episode Description |
|---|---|---|---|
| 1 | Govt. Officer | Govt. Official | A satirical take on the functioning of government offices. It parodies the misuse of government machinery, portrayed through a head of a government office (Jaspal Bhatti) deploying public officials and resources to search for his missing pet dog and according promotion to official who is successful in the endeavour. |
| 2 | Medical Bills | Patient's friend | A satirical take on fake medical reimbursement claims of employees. Jaspal Bhatti's friend, who is very ill, gets hospitalized in his name to get free government sponsored medical care. When he passes away, people assume Jaspal Bhatti to be dead. |
| 3 | Property | Tenant | A satirical take on the travails of honest real estate property owners. This episode highlights some of the devious schemes used by tenants for usurping residential property belonging to others. |
| 4 | Contractor | Tenant | A take on the poor quality construction of Government-built apartments, shoddy work of contractors and nexus between government engineers and contractors. It showcases the troubles of residents of housing complexes. |
| 5 | Ph.D. | Professor and Ph.D. student's guide | A satirical take on the harassment that professors guiding post-graduate research students submit them to. In this episode, Jaspal Bhatti plays the professor guiding a Ph.D. student. He gets all his domestic chores done through his protégé. Eventually, he agrees to pass his student's thesis with the intention of getting him married to his sister-in-law. |
| 6 | Meeting | Govt. Official | This episode takes on the daily routine of Government bureaucrats who spent most of their day in meaningless meetings and instead of making decisions, form committees and subcommittees, eventually leading to no result. |
| 7 | Chief Guest | Chief Guest | A satirical take on chief guests arriving late at public functions and thus making audiences wait. The episode illustrates the misery of a chief guest (Jaspal Bhatti) who actually arrives at a function on time. |
| 8 | Doctor | Doctor | A take on the callous working habits of doctors in Government hospitals, unionism amongst nurses and ward boys. Jaspal Bhatti plays a doctor who thinks that he lost his watch in a patient's stomach during a surgery. |
| 9 | Line Man | Telephone customer | A parody on the working of the Indian telephone department and its officials. It shows the delays in getting telephone connections, and the poor quality of telephone infrastructure in those days. |
| 10 | TV Serial | Producer | Based on the lack of creative content in TV productions. It parodied an attempt to produce a television programme by individuals with money but no qualifications. Jaspal Bhatti plays the producer here. |

== Cast ==
- Jaspal Bhatti as himself "Bhattiji"
- Savita Bhatti as herself, also known as Preeti Bhatti by everyone and fondly Preeti by her husband. She is often cross towards any women whom Jaspal Bhatti calls as she is afraid as he could marry the girl.
- Vivek Shauq as various characters
- Neena Cheema as various characters
- B. N. Sharma as various characters
- Rajesh Jolly as various characters
- Binny Grover as various characters
- Brijesh Ahuja as various characters
- Devender Mundepi as various characters
- Kishore Mehta as various characters
- Kuldeep Sharma as various characters
- Payal Chaudhary as various characters
- Prem Kakaria as various characters
- Rajinder as various characters
- Ramesh Chadda as various characters
- Ravi Sharma as various characters
- Shyam Juneja as various characters
- Vinod Sharma as various characters
- Arjuna Bhalla as various characters
