= Chaar Din Ki Chandni =

- Directed by: Samir Karnik
- Screenplay by: Amit V Masurkar; Nishant Hada
- Produced by: Samir Karnik; Ashish Kathpal
- Starring: Kulraj Randhawa; Tusshar Kapoor
- Cinematography: Kabir Lal
- Edited by: Mukesh Thakur
- Music by: Background Score: Sanjoy Chowdhury; Songs: Sandesh Shandilya; RDB; Shiv Hari; Abhishek Ray; Dr. Zeus
- Production company: Top Angle Productions
- Release date: 9 March 2012
- Country: India
- Language: Hindi

Chaar Din Ki Chandni (transl. Four nights of moonlight) is a 2012 Indian Hindi romantic comedy film directed and produced by Samir Karnik. The film stars Tusshar Kapoor and Kulraj Randhawa in the lead roles while Anupam Kher, Om Puri and Anita Raj appear in supporting roles. It was released on 9 March 2012 and received generally negative reviews.

== Cast ==
- Kulraj Randhawa as Chandni Singh
- Tusshar Kapoor as Veer Vikram Singh/Pappi Sardar
- Anupam Kher as Chandraveer Singh
- Om Puri as Fatoor Singh
- Mukul Dev as Udaybhan
- Johny Lever as Paan Singh
- Anita Raj as Devika
- Sushant Singh as Yashwant Singh
- Chandrachur Singh as Prithvi Singh
- Farida Jalal as Pammi Kaur
- Rahul Singh as Lt. Shaitan
- Harish Kumar
- Shruti Sharma Divya

== Production ==
Filming took place across Rajasthan and Amritsar in India.

== Reception ==
=== Critical reception ===
Chaar Din Ki Chandni received generally negative reviews from critics. Taran Adarsh from Bollywood Hungama gave it 3/5 and added "A loud comedy that tries too hard to be funny and romantic,". Critic Rajeev Masand rated this film 0 out of 5, saying this is the worst film of 2012.

== Soundtrack ==
Chaar Din Ki Chandni

Soundtrack album by Various artists
- Released: 6 March 2012
- Genre: Film soundtrack
- Length: 23:59
- Label: Saregama

The song Chandni O Meri Chandni is a modern-day remixed version of the song of the same name from the film Chandni.

Track Listing
| No. | Title | Music | Singer(s) | Length |
|---|---|---|---|---|
| 1. | "Chandni O Meri Chandni" (2012 Version) | Shiv-Hari and RDB | Shaan, Suraj Jagan, Sukhwinder Singh, Javed Ali, Ash King, Kunal Ganjawala, Jonita Gandhi | 4:10 |
| 2. | "Radha Rani" | Sandesh Shandilya | Sandesh Shandilya and Shweta Pandit | 3:52 |
| 3. | "Dj Play That Song" | DG | Anaya Brahma | 4:28 |
| 4. | "Chandni O Meri Chandni" (House Mix) | Shiv-Hari and RDB | Parichay and Nindy Kaur | 3:01 |
| 5. | "Chaar Din Ki Chandni" (Club Mix) | Abhishek Ray | Shaan, Sunidhi Chauhan | 4:56 |
| 6. | "Kangna Tera Ni" | Dr. Zeus | Lumber | 3:32 |
| Total length: | | | | 23:59 |

== See also ==
- List of Hindi films of 2012
