= Mannat (film) =

- Directed by: Gurbir Singh Grewal
- Produced by: Anuradha Prasad
- Starring: Jimmy Sheirgill; Kulraj Randhawa; Deep Dhillon; Manav Vij; Kanwaljeet
- Cinematography: Harmeet Singh
- Music by: Jaidev Kumar
- Distributed by: B.A.G. Films
- Release date: 6 October 2006
- Country: India
- Language: Punjabi

Mannat (Transl: Wish) is a Punjabi Film directed by Gurbir Singh Grewal. This movie is produced by famous Bollywood producer, Anuradha Prasad. The film was distributed by B.A.G. Films. It was released in October 2006. It stars Jimmy Sheirgill, Kulraj Randhawa, Manav Vij and Kanwaljit Singh. It was the debut film of Randhawa, a famous TV actress, and the second Punjabi film of Shergill, after Yaaran Naal Baharan.

== Plot overview ==
During the year 1985, reminiscent of an era of turmoil in Punjab, an army officer, Nihal Singh, falls in love with a local village girl named Prasinn Kaur. Their romance ultimately leads to a marriage but the fate has tragedy in store for them. Nihal's unit is dispatched to Siachen Glacier and he has to leave his pregnant wife under the care of a couple who are his neighbours. However, due to an unfortunate incident, Prasinn dies after giving birth to a baby girl. Her neighbour, who is desperate to become a mother, steals the child. From here the misery of the army officer starts. A twist in the story sends him to prison for serving a life term. After completing the sentence his search for his daughter starts again. This story is all about love, passion, hatred, betrayal and romance. Motivated from a true incident, which the director came across in 1996, the film brings out various facts of human behavior in a true Punjabi flavour and spirit.
