= Kyun! Ho Gaya Na... =

2004 Indian film by Samir Karnik

- Theatrical release poster
- Directed by: Samir Karnik
- Written by: Rajesh Soni; Tushar Hiranandani; Milap Zaveri; Vivek Oberoi
- Produced by: Boney Kapoor
- Starring: Amitabh Bachchan; Aishwarya Rai; Vivek Oberoi; Suniel Shetty
- Cinematography: Sudeep Chatterjee
- Edited by: Sanjib Datta; Sanjay Sankla
- Music by: Shankar–Ehsaan–Loy
- Production companies: Sahara One Motion Pictures; BSK Network and Entertainment
- Distributed by: Eros International
- Release date: 13 August 2004
- Running time: 172 minutes
- Country: India
- Language: Hindi
- Budget: ₹10 crore
- Box office: ₹16.35 crore

Kyun! Ho Gaya Na..., released in English as Look What's Happened Now, is a 2004 Indian Hindi-language romantic comedy film directed by Samir Karnik. It is a remake of Bengali film Nater Guru (2003), which itself is based on Samaresh Basu's eponymous story. It stars Amitabh Bachchan, Vivek Oberoi, Aishwarya Rai, Suniel Shetty, and Kajal Aggarwal in her acting debut.

== Plot ==
Diya (Aishwarya Rai) is an intelligent university student with strong views on love and marriage. She spends much of her time at an orphanage in Coorg in Karnataka, helping her "Uncle" Raj Chauhan (Amitabh Bachchan) with the children living there. The story begins when Diya travels to Mumbai for her written exams. While there, she stays with her father's friend and meets their lighthearted, free-spirited son, Arjun (Vivek Oberoi). His views on love and life are completely different from hers. The pair start spending an increasing amount of time with each other, and throughout all their arguments and conversations, they soon fall in love. Diya is more open about professing her feelings, while Arjun is an introvert, being reluctant and preferring not to disclose his true intentions. Diya is left feeling heartbroken after he denies loving her, and she leaves him.

Arjun travels to the orphanage in the hopes of reconciling with Diya and apologising to her. There, he realizes his true feelings for Diya and is eager to reveal his love for her. It is revealed that Diya is now planning to marry her childhood friend, Ishaan (Suniel Shetty). Diya and Arjun start spending more time together and once again rekindle their romance. It is later revealed that Ishaan is only a friend of Diya's, and the fake marriage was a plan by Raj to teach Arjun the importance of always being true to love and following his heart. She then marries Arjun.

== Cast ==
- Amitabh Bachchan as Raj Chauhan, Diya's uncle
- Aishwarya Rai as Diya Malhotra
- Vivek Oberoi as Arjun Khanna
- Suniel Shetty as Ishaan Rajput
  - Rohan Shah as young Ishaan Rajput
- Dia Mirza as Preeti Jaiswal
- Om Puri as Mr. Amit Khanna
- Rati Agnihotri as Sulochana Khanna
- Kajal Aggarwal as Diya's sister
- Arjun Mathur as Sumi
- Tinnu Anand as Sandeep Malhotra
- Rahul Singh as Banna Dabas
- Jennifer Winget as Diya's friend
- Sheena Bajaj
- Gaurav Gera as Vinay Bhalla
- Ajit Ahuja as Manu Deo
- Anupama Kumar as Adoptive Parent

== Soundtrack ==
Kyun! Ho Gaya Na...

Studio album by Shankar–Ehsaan–Loy
- Released: 17 June 2004 (India)
- Genre: Feature film soundtrack
- Label: Tips Music Films
- Producer: Shankar–Ehsaan–Loy

Shankar–Ehsaan–Loy chronology
Rudraksh (2004)	Kyun! Ho Gaya Na... (2004)	Lakshya (2004)

All lyrics are written by Javed Akhtar; all music is composed by Shankar–Ehsaan–Loy.

No.	Title	Artist(s)	Length
1.	"Pyar Mein Sau Uljhanne Hai"	Shankar Mahadevan, Mahalaxmi Iyer, Sneha Pant, Vijay Prakash	5:29
2.	"No No!"	Chetan Shashital, Dominique Cerejo, Kunal Ganjawala, Loy Mendonsa, Shankar Mahadevan	4:03
3.	"Aao Na"	Sadhana Sargam, Shankar Mahadevan & Udit Narayan	6:33
4.	"Main Hoon"	Shaan, Sunidhi Chauhan	5:13
5.	"Baat Samjha Karo"	Amitabh Bachchan, Shankar Mahadevan, Javed Ali, Chetan Shashital	6:00
6.	"Dheere Dheere"	Shankar Mahadevan	5:37

Professional ratings
Review scores
Source	Rating
Bollywood Hungama	3.5/5 stars
Rediff.com	4/5 stars

== Reception ==
Taran Adarsh of Bollywood Hungama gave the film 1.5 out of 5 stars, writing "On the whole, Kyun! Ho Gaya Na? is body beautiful minus soul. At the box-office, the film may generate curiosity on the strength of its impressive cast as well as the fantastic promotion embarked upon by its makers, but the film doesn't have the merits to emerge victorious after the initial euphoria settles. It might find some patronage at multiplexes of metros".
