= Tanay Chheda =

Indian actor

Tanay Hemant Chheda
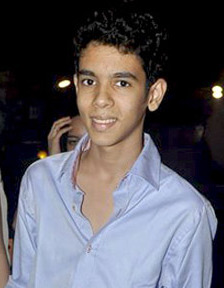
- Chheda in 2011
- Born: 27 June 1996 (age 30); Mumbai, Maharashtra, India
- Education: Choate Rosemary Hall
- Occupation: Actor
- Years active: 2006–2011; 2024
- Notable work: Don: The Chase Begins Again (2006); Taare Zameen Par (2007); Slumdog Millionaire (2008); My Name Is Khan (2010)

Tanay Hemant Chheda (born 27 June 1996) is an Indian actor who works in Hindi films. He is best known for his child performances in the critically acclaimed films Taare Zameen Par (2007) and Slumdog Millionaire (2008), with the latter earning him the Screen Actors Guild Award for Outstanding Performance by a Cast in a Motion Picture and a nomination for Best Ensemble at the Black Reel Awards of 2008.

== Early life ==
Chheda was born on 27 June 1996 and is a Gujarati Jain with roots in Mundra, Kutch. He was born in Mumbai, Maharashtra, where he currently lives. He attended the Choate Rosemary Hall in Wallingford, Connecticut, United States.

== Filmography ==
Year	Title	Role	Notes
2006	Don: The Chase Begins Again	Deepak "Deepu" Ahuja	Debut film
2007	Taare Zameen Par (Like Stars on Earth)	Rajan Damodaran	
2008	Slumdog Millionaire	Teenage Jamal	
2010	My Name is Khan	Junior Rizwan	
2011	Lilly the Witch: The Journey to Mandolan	Musa	
2021	Oye Mamu!	Akhil	
2024	Cadets: A Coming-Of-Age Journey of Brotherhood and Honor		
