= Chintu Ji =

- Directed by: Ranjit Kapoor
- Written by: Ranjit Kapoor
- Produced by: Bobby Bedi; Gautam Talwar
- Starring: Rishi Kapoor; Kulraj Randhawa; Priyanshu Chatterjee
- Cinematography: Sunny Joseph
- Music by: Songs: Sukhwinder Singh; Abhishek-Ishteyak; Background Score: Raju Singh
- Production company: Kaleidoscope Entertainment
- Distributed by: Eros International
- Release date: 4 September 2009
- Country: India
- Language: Hindi

Chintu Ji is a 2009 Indian Hindi-language film that stars Rishi Kapoor, Priyanshu Chaterjee, and Kulraj Randhawa. It was directed by Ranjit Kapoor (in his directorial debut) written by Shabbir Ahmed. The film was released on Rishi Kapoor's 57th Birthday.

== Plot ==
Rishi (Rishi Kapoor), the son of legendary Raj Kapoor, decides to try his hand at politics and, to garner support, relocates to his birth village, Hadbahedi. The village is located in an isolated area where most trains do not stop, and electricity is only available for 6 hours a day. He decides to shoot a film 'Khooni Khazana' with producer/director Malkani. Once there, he secretly makes a deal to lend his name to an alcoholic beverage in exchange for a plot of land in nearby Triphala and one crore rupees, while pledging to the naive villagers that he has no intention of relocating anywhere. Misled villagers believe Hadbahedi will get popular and modernized and decide to assist him with all their might. Things escalate into chaos and anger when they find out that their valuables are being stolen and the women are being molested by the film crew, while the police accuse them of harboring a terrorist who was responsible for the 13 December 2001 attack on the Indian Parliament.

== Cast ==
- Rishi Kapoor as Rishi 'Chintuji' Raj Kapoor / Kamlesh Sukheja Ji
- Priyanshu Chatterjee as Arun Bakshi / Mohit Baghel
- Kulraj Randhawa as Devika Malhotra / Mohini Bakshi
- Saurabh Shukla as Malkani
- Grusha Kapoor as Kanta
- Swadesh Badhu as Chaudhryji
- Vishal Bahl as Film Unit goon
- Gaurav Bhattacharya as Film choreographer
- Kanchan Bisht as Friend
- Sophie Choudry as Menka
- Sanjiv Chopra as Oberoi
- Gilles Chuyen as Jack
- Pankaj Dubey as Arun's Friend - Richshaw
- Dheerendra Dwivedi as Manish ad
- Satish Fenn as Pilot
- Ashish Ghosh as Dr. Ghoshal
- Surender Gill as Griver Gopal
- Bhupesh Joshi as Bansi
- Teekam Joshi as Kutty
- Chander Kalra as Zaidi - Post Master
- Annu Kapoor as Amar Sanghvi
- Kamal Shabnam Kapoor as Shakuntala
- Neha Kaul as Ayesha
- Ishtiyak Khan as AD
- Sergei Khashkouski as Uzbek foreign Secy
- Hemant Maahaor as Gyan - Arun's Friend (as Hemant Mahaur)
- Mahendra Mewati as Vidyasagar
- Natasha as Russian Interpreter
- Padmashree as Nurse Mariama
- Govind Pandey as Inspector Chauhan
- Harry Parmar as Friend
- Manisha Pradhan as Meenu
- Shubhdip Raha as Babban
- Anil Rastogi as Vashishthji (as Dr. Anil Rastogi)
- Kseniya Ryabinkina as Kseniya
- Vishal Saini as Hawaldar Joginder
- Virender Sharma as Film Action Director
- Atamjit Singh as Station Master
- Sahib Singh as Lehna
- Veer Pratap Singh as Mobile Network Leader
- Amitabh Srivastava as Mehta
- Pankaj Tripathi as Paplu Yadav
- Sanjeev Vatsa as Prakash
- P.D. Verma as Writer Amaan
- Dinesh Yadav as Dinesh - Servant

== Soundtrack ==
No.	Title	Singer(s)	Length
1.	"Vote For Chintuji Akira Kurosawa"	Amjad Nadeem	5:42
2.	"Yahan Sab Theek Hai"	Sukhwinder Singh	4:45
3.	"Akira Kurosawa"	Anushka Manchanda	3:49
4.	"Chaai Ke Bahane"	Roopkumar Rathod, Madhushree	5:00
5.	"Vote For Chintuji" (Remix)	Amjad Nadeem	5:22

== Reception ==
Taran Adarsh of Bollywood Hungama gave the film 3.5 out 5 writing, "Rishi Kapoor is the soul of CHINTUJI. The veteran has essayed a wide variety of roles in his illustrious career, but CHINTUJI is special. This is amongst his most accomplished works. Priyanshu Chatterjee looks perfect for his part. Kulraj Randhawa is highly competent. Amongst the assorted characters, Grusha Kapoor and Saurabh Shukla are excellent. Kamal Chatterjee Shabnam, the septuagenarian who plays the dai, is very good. Sophie Choudry is alright. The remaining actors are also well cast. On the whole, CHINTUJI is a gem that deserves a watch."

In 2020, Sukanya Verma in a retrospective article for Rediff.com wrote, "A little gem of a satire, Chintuji -- named after the actor's real life nickname -- needs to be watched and enjoyed by many more people."
