= Jaanam Samjha Karo =

- Directed by: Andaleb Sultanpuri
- Written by: Naeem-Ejaz (dialogues)
- Screenplay by: Rajkumar Santoshi
- Produced by: Bubby Kent
- Starring: Salman Khan; Urmila Matondkar
- Cinematography: W. B. Rao
- Edited by: Mukhtar Ahmed
- Music by: Anu Malik; Anand–Milind (songs), Nikhil-Vinay (BGM)
- Production company: Karishma International
- Release date: 2 April 1999
- Running time: 156 minutes
- Country: India
- Language: Hindi
- Budget: ₹9 crore
- Box office: ₹17.82 crore

Jaanam Samjha Karo (transl. Sweetheart, Try to Understand) is a 1999 Indian Hindi-language romance film directed by Andaleb Sultanpuri who is the son of veteran lyricist Majrooh Sultanpuri and made his directorial debut with this film. It remains the only film he has directed. It was released on 2 April 1999. The film stars Salman Khan and Urmila Matondkar in lead roles, with Shakti Kapoor, Shammi Kapoor, Sadashiv Amrapurkar, Jaspal Bhatti and Monica Bedi in supporting roles.

The movie was shot in many parts of West London including Heathrow, Hounslow and Hayes. It did average business at the box office.

== Plot ==
Chandni (Urmila Matondkar), a lower-class, talented night club singer and dancer at Daniel's (Sadashiv Amrapurkar) club, who also happens to be religious, and well mannered, lives an unfortunate life with her three aunts (Bindu, Navneet Nishan, Kannu Gill), who dominate her life, and with a weak maternal grandmother. She dances for a living because it is the only way she can support her poor family and she hopes to give her nieces an education. Besides, she believes in her dream that a prince charming will come in her life and marry her.

On the other hand, Rahul (Salman Khan), a young wealthy womanizer makes plans to go to Paris with Monica (Monica Bedi) but learns that his 45-day break is over in London and has to fly to India to learn business with his secretary Tubby, who is managing his grandfather's business. At a temple, Chandni talks to a hermit girl (Deepshikha) who directs her to Rahul who appears to take his grandfather, a disguised Tubby, to the temple, only to woo the hermit girl. Rahul gives her a note asking her to leave all and elope with him. Rahul disappears, leaving Tubby to take a beating. One night while singing, Chandni meets Rahul and falls in love with him. Rahul feels attracted to her but he does not take her seriously. He intends to treat her just like any of his other girlfriends and only wants to have a short affair. However, after a mistaken impulse of kissing Chandni turns out bad for Rahul, he realizes she is not like the girls he had met and he tries to mend things sending a gift to Chandni, but it is rejected by her as she feels as if Rahul keeps following her.

After C. C. Patel, a show organizer with offers for Chandni is thrown out by Daniel, Rahul buys Daniel's club, resulting in Daniel kidnapping Chandni to avenge his ruin and is eventually beaten and taken by the police. Chandni argues with Rahul for making matters worse but her grandmother sensitizes her on thanking him instead. Chandni encounters one of his ex-girlfriends who confesses to her his exact nature with girls, just before meeting and fighting with Rahul. Also angry at her aunts for their attraction to luxury, Chandni meets her old friend Divya (Grusha Kapoor) who came to invite her to her wedding. At its musical evening, Chandni finds herself disgusted by Divya's mother (Rohini Hattangadi) due to her lower class and disreputable job. She, however, joins in to sing but her feelings take over in between and she runs out from there in tears. Chandni then accepts to perform for C. C. Patel without any other choice, but due to document issues, he can allow only Chandni to fly to London. Later on, she is stranded and alone in London, being chased by an old Indian pervert who tricked her into getting into his car since she was stuck outside the Indian embassy. She runs out of the car after the old man tries to molest her and is coincidentally saved by Rahul whose car was broken. After their safe survival that night in a nearby shelter, Rahul invites her to stay at his rather luxurious hotel.

There, Rahul meets his old womanizer friend Harry (Shakti Kapoor) but then stuck with a blonde French girl bearing his child. Rahul gets rid of her and joins Chandni for shopping, in Harry's notice. Chandni finds an old Indian man with whom she chats and enjoys Indian lifestyle abroad, not knowing he's Rahul's grandfather, Dadaji (Shammi Kapoor). Bumping into the latter in the same hotel, Rahul suddenly persuades Chandni to leave the hotel at the soonest. Dadaji takes him out for a coffee where Rahul neglects Chandni in front of him. Later, Dadaji catches both of them together and demands an explanation, to which Rahul says Chandni is his wife whom he married to save her honour. One day, however, Dadaji mentions that he wants to see Rahul married to Chandni. In order to fool him, Rahul asks Chandni to pretend to be his wife, which she accepts. In this role, Chandni acquires the respect she longed to have. She meets Divya again who is on travel with her husband, Ashwin, and mother. On further acquaintance between them and Rahul, it is found that Ashwin's factories are dependent on Rahul's for garments and he finally met him as he wanted. Divya's mother feels then lower in status than Chandni who feels proud of wearing the mangalsutra.

Harry and Monica join hands to mislead Rahul while driving away Chandni. After Dadaji leaves, Rahul goes squandering his money on gambling and after losing, he's instigated by the duo against Chandni who has then been entrusted with some investment money. Rahul and Chandni have a big fight, where Rahul slaps Chandni, and both decide to go their separate ways. Harry tries to make advances towards Chandni but she slaps him. When asked outside the restaurant about what happened, Harry says "Thappad khaya hai Chandni Se Maine". Chandni is hurt and expresses her pain in her performance. Dadaji has a talk with her before she leaves, and discusses her goodness with Rahul who then realizes that he has fallen in love with her. The unfaithful duo, on their success, abuses Chandni to which Rahul fights with them and begins enmity with Harry. Despite inheriting all wealth, Rahul follows Chandni back to India from London. Meanwhile, Chandni has promised to settle with Daniel in Goa, still as a bar dancer, in exchange for a new bank account, with all of Daniel's savings, to Chandni's family. Rahul goes to her home and asks to speak to her, but she refuses to listen to him. So he yells out his apologies in front of her house and states that he loves her while a crowd gathers, including Daniel. Harry arrives there with a gang to take revenge from Chandni for slapping him and they get into a fight. When Rahul is almost about to murder his ex-friend, Chandni comes out and tells him to not ruin his life by killing Harry. Rahul then proposes to her, and Chandni wants to accept, except that she can't break her promise to Daniel who then feels as if he has witnessed true love and kindly lets Chandni go. Chandni then accepts Rahul's proposal and the movie ends with them embracing each other.

== Cast ==
- Salman Khan as Rahul
- Urmila Matondkar as Chandni
- Shakti Kapoor as Harry
- Sadashiv Amrapurkar as Daniel
- Jaspal Bhatti as Tubby, Rahul's secretary
- Bindu as Mona, Chandni's first aunt
- Navneet Nishan as Anju ,Chandni's second aunt
- Monica Bedi as Monica
- Shammi Kapoor as Krishna Mehra , Rahul's Dadaji
- Rohini Hattangadi as Shanti ,Divya's mother
- Grusha Kapoor as Divya
- Mushtaq Khan as Sujit Patel
- Laxmikant Berde as Lakhan Shastri

== Music ==
Jaanam Samjha Karo

Soundtrack album by Anu Malik Anand Milind
- Released: 6 January 1999
- Genre: Feature film soundtrack
- Length: 50:37
- Label: Tips Industries

The soundtrack of the film contains eight songs. The music was composed by Anu Malik, except for one song composed by the duo Anand–Milind ("Kisi Ne Humse Kiya Hai Vaada"). Lyrics were authored by Majrooh Sultanpuri, except for "Main Ladki Akeli" whose lyrics were penned by Malik.

Love Hua samples Angelo by Brotherhood of Man and I was made for Loving You samples an english song with the same lyrics by KISS .

The music was very popular at that time.

#	Song	Singer(s)	Length
1.	"Jaanam Samjha Karo"	Anu Malik & Hema Sardesai	06:35
2.	"I Was Made For Loving You"	Kamaal Khan, Ila Arun & Anu Malik	06:36
3.	"Chandni Aaya Hai Tera Deewana"	Udit Narayan	06:22
4.	"Love Hua"	Kumar Sanu, Alka Yagnik	06:45
5.	"Sabki Baaratein Aayi"	Jaspinder Narula	05:38
6.	"Main Ladki Akeli"	Hema Sardesai & Anu Malik	07:11
7.	"Kisi Ne Humse Kiya Hai Vaada"	Alka Yagnik	06:14
8.	"Sabki Baaratein Aayi"	Alka Yagnik	05:46
