= Mahendra Mewati =

Indian actor (1970–2019)

- Mahendra Mewati during the interview of Not so Famous
- Born: January 25, 1970; Sagar, Madhya Pradesh
- Died: 9 January 2019 (aged 48); Versova, Mumbai
- Education: National School of Drama
- Occupations: Theatre Actor & Stage Director
- Years active: 1995–2019
- Known for: Aurangzeb (stage play)

Mahendra Mewati (25 January 1970 – 9 January 2019) was an Indian theatre and film actor known for his theatre productions and for films. He has also directed the play Oedipus Rex (written by Sophocles).

== Early life ==
Mahendra Mewati was born in Sagar, Madhya Pradesh, to a Hindu family. He did school education from Ambikapur and then graduated from Sagar University. During this time, Ashutosh Rana was his senior and influenced by him, Mahendra chose the path of acting, and passed the NSD examination and enrolled in acting studies.

In 1992, he earned a scholarship to study at National School of Drama (NSD) in New Delhi.

== Death ==
Mahendra Mewati was found dead in his Versova Mumbai residence on 9 January 2019 night. In the morning when the actors reached the rehearsals of the play, then Mahendra Mewati had a blood clot, and was found dead, cause of the death has not been revealed.

== Filmography ==
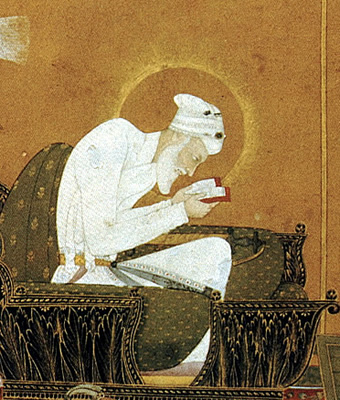
Aurangzeb, the character played by Mahendra Mewati

Year	Film	Role	Notes
2018	Kedarnath	Babaji (Mad Baba)	Final film
2015	Tevar	Mahesh Mishra (Radhika's brother)	
2013	Bhaag Milkha Bhaag	Kirpal Singh	
2009	Chintu Ji	Vidyasagar	
2005	Mangal Pandey: The Rising	Mahout	Debut film

Stage Roles with NSD Repertory:

Play Name (Writer)	Role	Director of the Play
Aks Tamasha (Chandrashekhar Kambar)	Prince	Bhanu Bharti
Band Gali Ka Aakhri Makan (Dharmveer Bharti)	Hari Ram	Devendra Raj Ankur
Bhookh Aag Hai (Krishna Baldev Vaid)	Chorus	Ram Gopal Bajaj
Chukayenge Nahin (Dario Fo)	Policeman/Inspector	Bhanu Bharti
Dhruvswamini (Jaishankar Prasad)	Ramgupta	Rabijita Gogoi
Ghasiram Kotwal (Vijay Tendulkar)	Ghasiram	Rajinder Nath
Inder Sabha (Amanat Lakhnawi)	Indra	Mohan Upreti
Raaste (G. P. Deshpande)	Madhav/Mahadev	Pt. Satyadev Dubey
Raja Ki Rasoi (Mohan Maharshi)	Raja	Mohan Maharshi
Taj Mahal Ka Tender (Ajay Shukla)	Shahjahan	Chittaranjan Tripathi
Thanku Baba Lochan Das (Nag Bodas)	Kantilal (Kanta)	V.M. Shah

== Theatre plays ==
Play	Role
Raja Ki Rasoi	Raja
Aurangzeb	Aurangzeb
Katha Ek Kans Ki	Kans
Crime and Punishment	
Thanku Baba Lochan Das	
Hamlet	Hamlet
