= Pune tc =

PUNE tc (the chosen destination!)
- Theatrical release poster
- Directed by: Abhijeet Choudhary
- Written by: Shaik Riyaz
- Produced by: Shaik Riyaz
- Starring: Shaik Riyaz; Ridhima Pathak; Sulagna Chatterjee; Bhakti Ratnaparkhi; Ayub Khan; Abhijeet Choudhary; Zameer Khan; Dhanashree Heblikar; Prerana Mahajan; Yuwaraj Shah
- Edited by: Santosh Gothoskar
- Music by: Jay Ji
- Release date: 2012
- Country: India
- Language: Hindi

PUNE tc is a Hindi romantic comedy film directed by Abhijeet Choudhary (Director & Founder of Swatantra Theatre, Pune). The movie is produced under Zoya & Saara Films. Eros International acquired the overseas rights of the film.

== Plot ==
Venkateshwarlu had spent his childhood and grew up at a small village near Tirupati. One day he decides to move to Mumbai. His friend instead convinces him to go to Pune. However, against his family's wish, finally he lands up at Pune. As he tries to make himself comfortable and settle down, slowly and gradually he finds himself entangled with Sonika, Sudha, Ananya, Disha & Dhriti who stay in the same bungalow. Sonika works at a call centre and is a fun loving girl. Ananya an investment banker is quite sure about what she wants in her life. Sudha a software engineer is desperately looking for a suitable match for her elder sister. Disha and Dhriti are daughters of the landlord and are ready to invite some love in their life. The film takes an interesting turn as Venky becomes the centre of attraction and starts making a comfortable seat in everyone's heart! Love and Chaos takes over.

== Cast ==
- Shaik Riyaz as Venkateshwarlu
- Dhanashree Heblikar as Disha
- Abhijeet Choudhary as Aasim Khan
- Ridhima Pathaka as Sonika
- Sulagna as Ananya
- Bhakti Ratnaparkhi as Sudha
- Ayub Khan as Hemang Patil
- Zameer Khan as Iqbal
- Prerna Mahajan as Dhriti
- Yuwaraj Shah as Father of Disha & Dhirti

== Soundtrack ==
PUNE TC music album launched on 6 January 2012. Within the few days of music release of PUNE tc, the songs were on the top 10 list in MP3 Hungama and Dhingana.

No.	Title	Singer(s)	Length
1.	"Manzil Meri Kya Hai"	Kunal Ganjawala	4:20
2.	"Bato Bato Mein"	Sonali Bhatewara	4:10
3.	"Man Pagal Pagal"	Jay Ji	4:23
4.	"Hero Banke"	Sonali Bhatewara
