= Power Cut =

- Directed by: Jaspal Bhatti
- Written by: Jaspal Bhatti
- Screenplay by: Jaspal Bhatti
- Produced by: P & R Films; Mad Arts, Jaspal Bhatti Film School; Paveljeet Singh
- Starring: Jaspal Bhatti; Jasraj Bhatti; Surilie Gautam; Rajesh Puri; Gauri Singh; Jaswinder Bhalla; Prem Chopra
- Cinematography: Raju Kay Gee
- Edited by: Jasraj Singh Bhatti
- Music by: Pawan Mishra
- Release date: 26 October 2012
- Country: India
- Language: Punjabi

Power Cut is a 2012 Indian Punjabi romantic comedy film. It was the last film directed by Jaspal Bhatti and produced by Paveljeet Singh under P & R Films and Mad Arts, Jaspal Bhatti Film School. The lead actors include Jaspal Bhatti himself, his wife Savita Bhatti and several well-known Punjabi actors. The film was released on 26 October 2012 worldwide. The movie mocks the power outages and corruption in India, especially in the state of Punjab.

== Cast ==
- Jaspal Bhatti as Pala
- Savita Bhatti as Preeto, wife of Pala
- Jasraj Singh Bhatti as Ashwinderpal Ritu Raj Singh (Ashu)
- Surilie Gautam as Bijli
- Jaswinder Bhalla as Bala
- Prem Chopra as Minister
- B N Sharma as Surjit Singh, Thali Maker
- Gurchet Chitrakar as Dhokha Rai,
- Rajesh Puri as S.K.Nehra, Chairman
- Surendra Sharma as Prem Chopra's P.A
- Chandan Prabhakar as Lineman Khamba Ram
- Zafar Khan as Current, son of Bala
- Jony Saini
