= Needhi Singh =

2016 Indian film

- Directed by: Jaivi Dhanda
- Written by: Gaurav Bhalla
- Screenplay by: Gaurav Bhalla
- Story by: Jaivi dhanda
- Produced by: Inder Bhandaal; Sumeet Singh Manchanda
- Starring: Kulraj Randhawa, Aman Sutdhar, Raman Dhagga
- Cinematography: Jatinder Sairaj
- Edited by: Mukesh Thakur
- Music by: Gurnazar; Kuwar Virk
- Release date: 22 July 2016
- Country: India
- Language: Punjabi

Needhi Singh is a 2016 Indian Punjabi-language crime thriller film directed by Jaivi Dhanda and produced by Inder Bhandaal and Sumeet Singh. The film is based on a true story about a village girl, Needhi Singh, who faces social estrangement and hardship. After which, she takes revenge on all of the people who did her wrong. The film was released on 22 July 2016.

== Cast ==
- Kulraj Randhawa
- Aman Sutdhar
- Ashish Duggal
- Raman Dhagga
- Gurdas Maan
