= Dil Pardesi Ho Gaya =

- Directed by: Thakur Tapasvi
- Produced by: Raj Kumar Verka
- Starring: Inderjit Nikku; Sana Nawaz; Daljeet Kaur; Shakti Kapoor; Raza Murad; Muhammad Sadiq; Akshay Kumar; Gauri Singh; Jaspal Bhatti; Raj Kumar Verka
- Release date: 20 September 2013
- Country: India
- Language: Punjabi

Dil Pardesi Ho Gaya is a 2013 Indian Punjabi language film directed by Thakur Tapasvi and starring Inderjit Nikku and Sana Nawaz Khan in the lead roles with Shakti Kapoor, Daljit Kaur, Jaspal Bhatti, Raza Murad, Muhammad Sadiq, Sardar Sohi and others. Akshay Kumar makes a special appearance.

== Cast ==
- Inderjit Nikku
- Sana Nawaz Khan
- Haya Ali
- Sardar Kamal
- Shakti Kapoor
- Ravinder Singh
- Jaspal Bhatti
- Raza Murad
- Parikshit Sahni
- Muhammad Sadiq
- Sardar Sohi
- Akshay Kumar (special appearance)
- Raj Kumar Verka
