= Vaada Raha =

2009 Indian film by Samir Karnik

- Theatrical poster
- Directed by: Samir Karnik
- Produced by: Eros International
- Starring: Bobby Deol; Kangana Ranaut; Dwij Yadav; Atul Agnihotri
- Cinematography: Binod Pradhan
- Music by: Songs: Monty Sharma; Babbu Mann; Background Score: Sanjoy Chowdhury
- Release date: 11 September 2009
- Country: India
- Language: Hindi

Vaada Raha (English: I Promise) is a 2009 Indian Hindi-language film, released on 11 September 2009. It stars Bobby Deol and Kangana Ranaut in the lead roles and Atul Agnihotri in a special appearance. It is directed by Samir Karnik. Some part of the film was shot in Ephesus, Turkey.

== Plot ==
After receiving a generous grant from the American Medical Association, Dr. Dyanesh Kripal "Duke" Chawla, who always gives hope to his patients, proposes to his sweetheart, Pooja, and they arrange to get married soon. While returning home that night, he meets with an accident and wakes up in the East-West Hospital place of recovery. Shattered and devastated, he is in for more trauma and shock when he finds out that Pooja will have nothing to do with him anymore. Upset, bitter, and in despair, he loses his will to live, refuses to take medicine or any treatment, and awaits death. One day, Roshan, a young boy, enters Duke's life to rekindle hope again. He starts telling him stories of the world seen outside his window and motivates him to take his medicines and start his physiotherapy. Day by day Duke starts improving, and one fine day he realises that Roshan was suffering from terminal cancer and he died, leaving a new life for Duke.

== Cast ==
- Bobby Deol as Dr. Dyanesh Kripal Chawla aka Duke
- Kangana Ranaut as Pooja
- Mohnish Behl as Dr. Max
- Atul Agnihotri as Suraj Sharma (Cameo)
- Prince Parth
- Vatsal Seth
- Prateeksha Lonkar as Dr. Kelkar
- Sharat Saxena as Mr. Sinha
- Vivek Shauq as Olderly
- Farida Dadi as Pooja's mom
- Dwij Yadav as Roshan Suraj Sharma
- Rajesh Vivek as Mr. Bakshi
- Sanjeev Mehra as Balwinder Singh Chaddha
- Rushita Singh as Sneha
- Shahab Khan as Mr. Shah
- Pariva Pranati
- Ravi Shankar Jaiswal as Patient

== Music ==
The music directors of the film are Monty Sharma and Babbu Mann.

=== Track listing ===
- "Vaada Raha" – Toshi Sabri
- "Rabb Na Kare" – Babbu Mann (Music and lyrics also by Babbu Maan)
- "Kubul" – Parthiv Gothil, Sharmista Chatreeji (Lyrics by Babbu Maan)
- "Aaj Aasmaan" – Shaan (Lyrics by Babbu Maan)
- "Rabb Na Kare" (Slow) – Babbu Mann
- "Achal Hain Mere Hausle" – Kunal Ganjawala
- "Vaada Raha" (Remix) – Toshi Sabri (Remixed by DJ Sanj)
- "Vaada Raha" – Theme
- "Flying High" – Theme
- "Lost in Love" – Theme
