= Surilie Gautam =

Indian actress

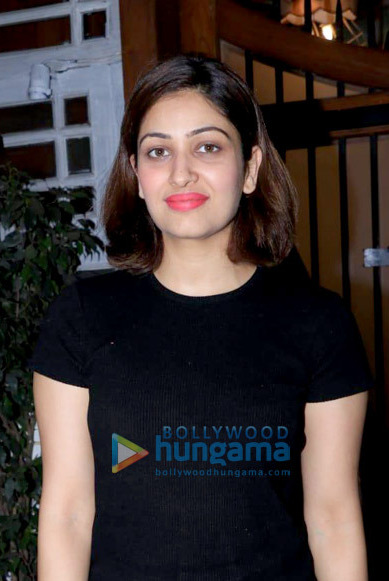
- Born: Lucknow, Uttar Pradesh, India
- Occupation: Actress
- Years active: 2008–present
- Spouse: Jasraj Singh Bhatti (m. 2013)
- Father: Mukesh Gautam
- Relatives: Yami Gautam (elder sister); Jaspal Bhatti (father-in-law); Aditya Dhar (brother-in-law)

Surilie Gautam Bhatti is an Indian film and television actress. She is the daughter of director Mukesh Gautam and younger sister of actress Yami Gautam. She made her television debut in 2008 with Meet Mila De Rabba. Later she started her film career with Punjabi film Power Cut.

She married Jasraj Singh Bhatti, son of actor Jaspal Bhatti, in November 2013 in Chandigarh. She completed her schooling from Yadavindra Public School, Mohali and went on to graduate from Goswami Ganesh Dutta Sanatan Dharma College before she moved to Mumbai to live with her elder sister, Yami Gautam. She is a graduate in Media and Event Management from the Indian School of Media, Mumbai.

== Filmography ==
Television

- 2008 Meet Mila De Rabba

Film

- 2012 Power Cut
- 2021 Shava Ni Girdhari Lal
- 2022 Posti
