= Rajesh Jolly =

Indian actor

- Born: 20 August 1960 (age 65); India
- Occupations: Actor; voice actor
- Years active: 1989–present

Rajesh Jolly (Rājēśa Jaulī; born 20 August 1960) is an Indian actor who's been working with Bollywood films and is also a voice actor who has been participating in dubbing foreign films into the Hindi language, mostly for English language films. He is fluent into English, Hindi and Punjabi.

He first began his career in an Indian television sitcom, Flop Show, created and starring Jaspal Bhatti. Rajesh is now currently running an acting school as well.

== Filmography ==
=== Live action television series ===
| Program title | Airdate | Role | Language | Episodes | Notes |
|---|---|---|---|---|---|
| Flop Show | 1989 | - | Hindi | 10 | |

=== Live action films ===
| Year | Film title | Role | Language | Notes |
|---|---|---|---|---|
| 1995 | Taaqat | - | Hindi | |
| 2004 | Veer-Zaara | - | Hindi | |

=== Animated films & series ===
| Year | Film title | Role | Language | Notes |
|---|---|---|---|---|
| 2005 | Hanuman | Ravana | Hindi | |
| 2014 | Manav | Yogiraj and Narrator | Hindi | |
| 2021 | The Legend of Hanuman | Sampati | Hindi | Airing on Disney Plus Hotstar |
| 2025 | Kurukshetra: The Great War of Mahabharata | Vyasa | Hindi | Airing on Netflix India |

== Dubbing career ==
Throughout Rajesh's career, he's been voicing for B-list characters and for various superheroes in Hindi-dubbed versions of Hollywood films, for over more than 18 years.

He has also Hindi-dubbed for animated films and television series, such as Commander Ulysses Feral from SWAT Kats: The Radical Squadron, Spike from Tom & Jerry and Bluto from Popeye when they were shown on Cartoon Network India.

== Dubbing roles ==
=== Anime/Animated series ===
| Program title | Original voice | Character | Dub language | Original language | Number of episodes | Original airdate | Dubbed airdate | Notes |
|---|---|---|---|---|---|---|---|---|
| Dexter's Laboratory | Jeff Bennett | Dad | Hindi | English | 78 | 4/27/1996–11/20/2003 | 8/22/1999–2006 | |
| SWAT Kats: The Radical Squadron | Gary Owens | Commander Ulysses Feral | Hindi | English | 24 | 9/11/1993– 8/9/1995 | 1/4/1999– 2000 | Hindi dub produced by Sound & Vision India and it aired on Cartoon Network India and aired on 4 January 1999, which was the day when the channel started providing content in the Hindi-dubbed format. |
| Super Robot Monkey Team Hyperforce Go! | Kevin Michael Richardson | Antauri | Hindi | English | 52 | 18 September 2004 – 16 December 2006 | | |
| Kung Fu Panda: Legends of Awesomeness | Fred Tatasciore | Master Shifu | Hindi | English | 70 | 11/7/2011–Current | Early 2012–Current | |
| Love, Death & Robots | Time Winters | Dicko | Hindi | English | 18 (dubbed 1) | 15 March 2019 – present | | Episode: "Sonnie's Edge" |
| Naruto | Hidekatsu Shibata | Hiruzen Sarutobi | Hindi | Japanese | 220 | October 3, 2002 – February 8, 2007 | August 15, 2022 - August 4, 2023 | Aired on Sony YAY |
| Naruto Shippuden | Hidekatsu Shibata | Hiruzen Sarutobi | Hindi | Japanese | 500 | February 15, 2007 – March 23, 2017 | March 18, 2024 - Present | Airing on Sony YAY |
| Batman: Caped Crusader | Eric Morgan Stuart | James Gordon | Hindi | English | 10 | 01/8/2024 | 01/8/2024 | All Episodes |

=== Live action films ===
==== Foreign language films ====
| Film title | Actor | Character | Dub language | Original language | Original Year Release | Dub Year Release | Notes |
|---|---|---|---|---|---|---|---|
| Jesus | Unknown | Devil | Hindi | English | 1979 | | |
| Braveheart | Mel Gibson | William Wallace | Hindi | English | 1995 | 1995 | |
| The Matrix | Laurence Fishburne | Morpheus | Hindi | English | 1999 | 1999 | |
| The Matrix Reloaded | Laurence Fishburne | Morpheus | Hindi | English | 2003 | 2003 | |
| The Matrix Revolutions | Laurence Fishburne | Morpheus | Hindi | English | 2003 | 2003 | |
| Predators | Laurence Fishburne | Noland | Hindi | English | 2010 | 2010 | |
| Sleepy Hollow | Michael Gough † | Notary James Hardenbrook | Hindi | English | 1999 | 1999 | |
| X2 | Brian Cox | Colonel William Stryker | Hindi | English | 2003 | 2003 | |
| Hellboy | Ron Perlman | Hellboy | Hindi | English | 2004 | 2004 | |
| The Chronicles of Narnia: The Lion, The Witch and The Wardrobe | Liam Neeson | Aslan (voice) | Hindi | English | 2005 | 2005 | |
| The Chronicles of Narnia: Prince Caspian | Liam Neeson | Aslan (voice) | Hindi | English | 2008 | 2008 | Rajesh's name was mentioned on the Hindi dub credits of the DVD release of the film. |
| The Chronicles of Narnia: The Voyage of the Dawn Treader | Liam Neeson | Aslan (voice) | Hindi | English | 2010 | 2010 | Rajesh's name was mentioned on the Hindi dub credits of the DVD release of the film, also containing the Tamil and Telugu credits. |
| Bandidas | Ismael 'East' Carlo | Don Diego Sandoval | Hindi | English; Spanish | 2006 | 2006 | |
| Casino Royale | Rene Mathis | Giancarlo Giannini | Hindi | English | 2006 | 2006 | |
| Pirates of the Caribbean: Dead Man's Chest | Geoffrey Rush | Captain Barbossa (uncredited cameo) | Hindi | English | 2006 | 2006 | |
| Pirates of the Caribbean: At World's End | Geoffrey Rush | Captain Barbossa | Hindi | English | 2007 | 2007 | |
| Pirates of the Caribbean: On Stranger Tides | Geoffrey Rush | Captain Barbossa | Hindi | English | 2011 | 2011 | |
| Pirates of the Caribbean: Dead Men Tell No Tales | Geoffrey Rush | Captain Barbossa | Hindi | English | 2017 | 2017 | |
| Live Free or Die Hard | Various | President; FBI Agent | Hindi | English | 2007 | 2007 | Internationally released as: Die Hard 4.0. |
| A Good Day to Die Hard | Bruce Willis | John McClane | Punjabi | English | 2013 | 2013 | |
| Iron Man | Terrence Howard | James Rhodes | Hindi | English | 2008 | 2008 | |
| Iron Man 2 | Don Cheadle | James Rhodes / War Machine | Hindi | English | 2010 | 2010 | |
| Iron Man 3 | Don Cheadle | James Rhodes / War Machine | Hindi | English | 2013 | 2013 | |
| Fast Five | Dwayne Johnson | Luke Hobbs | Hindi | English | 2011 | 2011 | |
| Conan the Barbarian | Ron Perlman | Corin | Hindi | English | 2011 | 2011 | |
| Cowboys & Aliens | Harrison Ford | Woodrow Dolarhyde | Hindi | English | 2011 | 2011 | |
| Men in Black 3 | Jemaine Clement | Boris | Hindi | English | 2012 | 2012 | |
| Batman Begins | Ken Watanabe Colin McFarlane | Ra's al Ghul (Decoy) Commissioner Loeb | Hindi | English | 2005 | 2005 | Rajesh has voiced two characters in the Hindi dub. |
| The Legend of Zorro | Nick Chinlund | Jacob McGivens | Hindi | English | 2005 | 2005 | |
| Ghost Rider | Sam Elliott | Caretaker | Hindi | English | 2007 | 2007 | |
| Avengers: Age of Ultron | Don Cheadle | James Rhodes / War Machine | Hindi | English | 2015 | 2015 | |
| Mission: Impossible | Ving Rhames | Luther Stickell | Hindi | English | 1996 | 1996 | |
| Mission: Impossible 2 | Ving Rhames | Luther Stickell | Hindi | English | 2000 | 2000 | |
| Mission: Impossible III | Laurence Fishburne | Theodore Brassel | Hindi | English | 2006 | 2006 | |
| Mission: Impossible – Ghost Protocol | Tom Wilkinson | IMF Secretary (Uncredited) | Hindi | English | 2011 | 2011 | |
| The Phantom | Bill Smitrovich | Dave Palmer | Hindi | English | 1996 | 1996 | |
| Captain America: Civil War | Don Cheadle | James Rhodes / War Machine | Hindi | English | 2016 | 2016 | |
| The Mummy | Russell Crowe | Dr. Henry Jekyll / Edward Hyde | Hindi | English | 2017 | 2017 | |
| Avengers: Infinity War | Don Cheadle | James Rhodes / War Machine | Hindi | English | 2018 | 2018 | |
| Captain Marvel | Don Cheadle | James Rhodes / War Machine (uncredited cameo) | Hindi | English | 2019 | 2019 | |
| Avengers: Endgame | Don Cheadle | James Rhodes / War Machine | Hindi | English | 2019 | 2019 | |
| Spider-Man | J. K. Simmons | J. Jonah Jameson | Hindi | English | 2002 | 2002 | |
| Spider-Man 2 | J. K. Simmons | J. Jonah Jameson | Hindi | English | 2004 | 2004 | |
| Spider-Man 3 | J. K. Simmons | J. Jonah Jameson | Hindi | English | 2007 | 2007 | |
| Spider-Man: Far From Home | J. K. Simmons | J. Jonah Jameson (Cameo) | Hindi | English | 2019 | 2019 | |
| Spider-Man: No Way Home | J. K. Simmons | J. Jonah Jameson | Hindi | English | 2021 | 2021 | |

==== Indian films ====
| Film title | Actor | Character | Dub language | Original language | Original Year Release | Dub Year Release | Notes |
|---|---|---|---|---|---|---|---|
| Khal-Naaikaa | Unknown actor | A wellwisher came to Dr. Rajan's funeral | Hindi | Hindi | 1993 | | He was uncredited despite all his efforts in the film. The actors were also uncredited in the film. |
| Khal-Naaikaa | Unknown actor | Police Officer | Hindi | Hindi | 1993 | | He was uncredited despite all his efforts in the film. The actors were also uncredited in the film. |
| Saaho | Lal | Ibrahim | Hindi | Hindi | 2019 | | |
| Sivaji: The Boss | Suman Talwar | Adiseshan | Hindi | Tamil | 2007 | 2010 | |
| 1: Nenokkadine | Kelly Dorjee (voice in original version dubbed by P. Ravi Shankar) | Antonio Rosarius | Hindi | Telugu | 2014 | 2014 | The Hindi dub was re-titled: 1: Ek Ka Dum. |
| Rudhramadevi | Suman Talwar | Hari Hara Devudu | Hindi | Telugu | 2015 | 2015 | |
| Raatchasi | Hareesh Peradi | Ramalingam | Hindi | Tamil | 2019 | 2020 | The Hindi dub was re-titled: Madam Geeta Rani. |
| Naa Alludu | Suman Talwar | Venkayya Naidu | Hindi | Telugu | 2005 | 2021 | The Hindi dub was re-titled: Main Hoon Gambler. |
| Soorarai Pottru | Mohan Babu | M. Bhaktavatsalam Naidu | Hindi | Tamil | 2020 | 2021 | The Hindi dub was re-titled: Udaan. |
| Asuran | Balaji Sakthivel | Inspector | Hindi | Tamil | 2019 | 2021 | |
| Pushpa: The Rise | Ajay Ghosh | Konda Reddy | Hindi | Telugu | 2021 | 2021 | |

=== Animated films ===
| Film title | Original voice | Character | Dub Language | Original language | Original Year Release | Dub year Release | Notes |
|---|---|---|---|---|---|---|---|
| Batman & Mr. Freeze: SubZero | Michael Ansara | Dr. Victor Fries / Mr. Freeze | Hindi | English | 1998 | | |
| The Wild | Kevin Michael Richardson | Samson's Father | Hindi | English | 2006 | 2006 | Rajesh's name is mentioned in the Hindi dub credits taken from the DVD release of the film. Samson's name was changed to Samsher in the Hindi dub. |
| Kung Fu Panda | Michael Clarke Duncan † | Commander Vachir | Hindi | English | 2008 | 2008 | |
| How to Train Your Dragon 2 | Gerard Butler | Stoick the Vast | Hindi | English | 2014 | 2014 | Rajesh's name was mentioned in the Hindi dubbing credits of the DVD release. |
| Rio 2 | Andy García | Eduardo | Hindi | English; Portuguese | 2014 | 2014 | |
| Ramayana: The Legend of Prince Rama | Uday Mathan | Ravana | Hindi | English | 10 January 1993 (International Film Festival of India); 3 November 1997 (Japan) | 24 January, 2025 | |

== See also ==
- Dubbing (filmmaking)
- List of Indian Dubbing Artists
