= Heroes (2008 film) =

2008 film by Samir Karnik

- Theatrical release poster
- Directed by: Samir Karnik
- Screenplay by: Samir Karnik; Aseem Arora
- Story by: Aseem Arora
- Produced by: Bharat Shah; Vikas Kapoor; Samir Karnik
- Starring: Mithun Chakraborty; Sunny Deol; Salman Khan; Bobby Deol; Preity Zinta; Sohail Khan; Vatsal Sheth; Dino Morea; Hrishitaa Bhatt
- Cinematography: Binod Pradhan; Gopal Shah
- Edited by: Sanjay Sankla
- Music by: Songs: Monty; Sajid–Wajid; Score: Sanjoy Chowdhury
- Production companies: Future Picture Company Pvt.Ltd; Mega Bollywood
- Distributed by: Eros International
- Release date: 24 October 2008
- Running time: 139 minutes
- Country: India
- Language: Hindi
- Budget: ₹18 crore
- Box office: ₹25.44 crore

Heroes is a 2008 Indian Hindi-language drama film directed by Samir Karnik, starring Mithun Chakraborty, Sunny Deol, Salman Khan, Bobby Deol, Preity Zinta, Sohail Khan, Vatsal Sheth, Dino Morea and Hrishitaa Bhatt.

The film was written by Aseem Arora. Although initially set to be released on 6 June 2008, it was pushed to 24 October 2008, the opening weekend of the holiday Diwali. On 22 November 2008 the script of Heroes was asked to be part of the Academy of Motion Picture Arts and Sciences.

== Plot ==
Two film academy students, Sameer and Ali, must make a movie in order to graduate. They choose to create a documentary illustrating reasons not to join the Indian Armed Forces and go on a motorcycle road trip bearing three letters they have been given to deliver — each from a slain soldier to his family.

On their first stop, in Atari, a village near Amritsar in the Punjab, they meet the widow, Kuljeet Kaur, and the son, Jasvinder Singh (Jassi), of an Indian Army soldier, Havildar Balkar Singh of 8 Sikh Regiment, who was killed in action three years earlier in Kargil. Instead of finding a family distraught and questioning the sacrifice, the students find that the entire village is immensely proud of Balkar Singh's heroism and his ultimate sacrifice for the country. His family, particularly his wife, displays great courage and an undefeated spirit. It is the first time Sameer and Ali truly begin to understand the honour and pride associated with serving in the armed forces, deeply contrasting with their initial cynical documentary premise.

The students' second stop, Himachal Pradesh, finds them meeting now wheelchair-using ex-Indian Air Force officer, Sqn Leader Vikram Shergill, whose Army officer brother, Captain Dhananjay Shergill, of 18 Grenadiers, had been martyred in the Kargil war. Vikram is very proud of his brother's bravery and sacrifice. He shows them how he has come to terms with his own grief. He confronts and defeats a group of unruly young men in a fight despite his debilitating injury when one of them inappropriately touches his girlfriend, Saloni. This makes Sameer and Ali realize Vikram’s underlying pride, strength, and perhaps his way of externally processing or demonstrating his resilience despite his physical injury and emotional loss.

The third letter is to be delivered to an elderly couple – Dr. Maqbool Naqvi and his wife Mrs. Naqvi – but their bike runs out of petrol, and they hitch a ride on a military convoy heading to a nearby base. They see soldiers' coffins in the truck, and the driver quotes an inspiring poem. At the base, they talk to the regiment commander and find another letter by Lieutenant Sahil Naqvi of Jammu and Kashmir Light Infantry, which they request to deliver themselves. They see that Mrs. Naqvi is busy at a tea party, hardly paying any attention. Sameer accuses her of not loving her son and says that Sahil was a coward. Mrs. Naqvi plays them a tape which Sahil had recorded after he had saved another soldier's life. She tells him that she and her husband have been affected, and the parties serve as a distraction for them. They leave, but return the next day and slowly bring the couple's life back to normal.

After completing their film, they reveal in a voice-over that although they graduated, they did not go to America (as they had initially planned) because the trip changed their outlook. They try to join the Army but fail, then start a school to share their experiences.

Some years later, Sameer and Ali are walking around their school campus. An officer in an olive green uniform approaches them. He is revealed to be Jassi, the son of late Havildar Balkar Singh. Now a strapping young man, he has joined the army like his father and will soon graduate from the IMA as a Lieutenant. The film ends with the statement, "You don't have to be a soldier to love your country".

== Cast ==
- Mithun Chakraborty as Dr. Maqbool Naqvi, Sahil’s father
- Sunny Deol as Squadron Leader Vikram Shergill – Dhananjay's elder brother and Saloni's boyfriend
- Salman Khan in a dual role as
  - Havildar Balkar Singh, Kuljeet's husband and Jassi's father
  - Lieutenant Jasvinder Singh "Jassi", Balkar and Kuljeet's son
    - Master Dwij as child Jasvinder Singh / Jassi
- Bobby Deol as Captain Dhananjay Shergill, Vikram's younger brother
- Preity Zinta as Kuljeet Kaur, Balkar's wife and Jassi's mother
- Dino Morea as Lieutenant Sahil Naqvi, Mr. and Mrs. Naqvi's son
- Sohail Khan as Sameer Saand
- Vatsal Sheth as Ali Nawab Shah
- Hrishitaa Bhatt as Saloni, Vikram's girlfriend
- Amrita Arora as Rhea, Sameer's girlfriend
- Riya Sen as Shivani, Ali's girlfriend
- Mohnish Behl as Akash Sarin
- Prateeksha Lonkar as Mrs. Naqvi, Maqbool's wife and Sahil’s mother
- Vivek Shauq as Rhea’s father
- Tinnu Anand as Dean
- Shahab Khan as Sahil's coach
- Karan Arora as Chotu

== Production ==
Originally titled Mera Bharat Mahaan (My India is Great), the film was rechristened Heroes, to avoid sounding jingoistic.

Filming began on 15 June 2007. Salman and Preity are paired opposite each other, in their fifth film together. Shooting took place in Ladakh, Chandigarh, Punjab and Delhi. Some scenes were shot in Pangong Tso featuring Salman Khan, Sohail Khan and Vatsal Sheth.

== Music and soundtrack ==
The film’s music was composed by Monty and Sajid–Wajid, with the lyrics penned by Jalees Sherwani and Rahul B. Seth. The background score of the movie was done by Sanjoy Chowdhury.

Heroes

Soundtrack album by Sajid–Wajid Monty Sharma
- Released: 11 September 2008
- Genre: Feature film soundtrack
- Label: Eros Music

No.	Title	Singer(s)	Length
1.	"Badmash Launde"	Shail Hada, Parthiv Gohil
2.	"What's Up My Bro"	Kunal Ganjawala
3.	"Mannata"	Sonu Nigam, Kavita Krishnamurthy
4.	"Makhana"	Sukhwinder Singh, Sowmya Raoh, Wajid Khan
5.	"Badmash Launde (Blasted)"	Shail Hada, Parthiv Gohil
6.	"What's Up My Bro (Slow)"	Shail Hada
7.	"Gurbani"	Shail Hada
8.	"Heroes Theme"	Shail Hada
9.	"Makhana You My Makhana (Killer)"	Sukhwinder Singh, Wajid Khan & Sowmya Raoh
10.	"Mannata (version 2)"	Sonu Nigam, Kavita Krishnamurthy
11.	"What's Up My Bro (cruiser)"	Kunal Ganjawala

== Release ==
=== Critical reception ===
Heroes received generally positive reviews from critics. Taran Adarsh of Bollywood Hungama gave the film 3.5 stars out of 5.

According to The Indian Express, the film does manage to say what it set out to; that pride keeps the families of the deceased soldiers going, civilians sleep peacefully only because soldiers give up their lives, and that a country survives only because it has brave soldiers guarding its borders. But it argues the director is too simplistic and that wringing emotion out of so many situations causes even the supreme sacrifice that the soldiers make turn trite. Indiatimes rated the movie 3 out of 5 stars.

=== Box office ===
The film grossed $326,425 in its opening week.
