= Inderjit Nikku =

Indian singer and actor

- Born: Inderjit Singh
- Origin: Ludhiana, Punjab, India
- Years active: 1995–present
- Labels: FineTone, T-Series, FineTouch

Inderjit singh, popularly known as Nikku, is an Indian singer and actor associated with Punjabi language music and films.

== Career ==
He has released numerous tracks, including "Kaki Ji", "Panjeban Wali", and "Singh Is King". He sang plenty of hit duet songs in past along with Jaspinder Narula. His music often focuses on Punjabi heritage and romantic folk themes.

In addition to singing, Nikku has appeared in several Punjabi films:

- Munde U.K. De (2009) - as Candy
- Pata Nahi Rabb Kehdeyan Rangan Ch Raazi (2012)
- Dil Pardesi Ho Gaya (2013)

== Career Resurgence (2022–Present) ==
In 2022, after a period of professional struggle, Nikku received immense support from the global Punjabi diaspora and fellow artists. He has worked with other performers like Diljit Dosanjh and Gippy Grewal.

== Discography ==
Year	Album	Record label	Music
2020	Viah	T-Series	ToNN-E & R GURU
2018	Canada Wale Gabru	MovieBox/Amar Audio	Gurmeet Singh
2014	Dil Dharkey	MovieBox/Speed Records	Popsy (The Music Machine)
2012	Singh By Nature	Amar Audio	Gurmeet Singh, Tarun Rishi, Tonn E Singh
2010	Khaalas (The Pure)	Speed Records	Honey Singh
2008	Dhur Ki Baani Aayi	PointZero Entertainers	Tarun Rishi
2007	Dil Wich	Finetouch, Kamlee Records, Planet Records	Jaidev Kumar
2006	Singh Is King	Finetouch	Gurmeet Singh
2005	Ek OnKar	T-Series	Tejwant Kittu
2002	Munde Chum-Chum Sutde Rumaal	Venus Records	Vivek Bakshi, Tejwant Kittu
2001	Haye Kamaal	Venus Records	Vivek Bakshi
2003	Punjebaan Wali	Finetouch	Vivek Bakshi
2001	Meri Mehbooba	Peritone	Atul Sharma
2000	Haye Saadi Jaan	Peritone	Tejwant Kittu, Atul Sharma
1999	Sajna Da Pind Langh Ke	Finetone,	Tejwant Kittu
2000	Sohnian Di Baraat	Finetone,	Tejwant Kittu
1996	Naseebo Chete Kardi Aa	Finetone,	Tejwant Kittu
1998	Haye Oye Rabba Dil Lagda Ei Nai	Finetone,	Tejwant Kittu
2000	Akhiyan Jaa Ladiyan	Finetone,	Tejwant Kittu
1995	Nasha Jawani Daa	Finetone,	Atul Sharma
2020	Bhabhi	Finetone,	Gurmeet Singh

== Filmography ==
Year	Album	Notes	Record label	Music
2012	Carry On Jatta	Special appearance	Speed Records	Amandeep Singh
2013	Dil Pardesi Ho Gia	With Sana Nawaz, Shakti Kapoor		
2013	Mere Yaar Kaminey	With Karan Kundra, Gaurav Kakkar		
2014	Eh Dil Da Mamla	With Veena Malik and Mangi Mahal	T-Series	
2014	Bade Changay Ne Mere Yaar Kaminey	With Karan Kundrra, Gaurav Kakkar		
2017	Attwadi Koun	With Kavisha Arora		
