= Dwij Yadav =

Indian actor

- Born: Mumbai, Maharashtra, India
- Occupation: Child actor

Dwij Yadav (born February 13, 1997) is a former child actor in Bollywood. His first release was Nanhe Jaisalmer: A Dream Come True (2007), where he played the lead role Nanhe Jaisalmer/Vikram Singh, along with Bobby Deol.

In Samir Karnik's Heroes (2008), he was seen as young Jassi. This movie starred Salman Khan, Preity Zinta, Bobby Deol and Sohail Khan.

In the movie Vaada Raha (2009), he had a strong role as Roshan. Bobby Deol and Kangana Ranaut are in this movie.

Sohail khan Productiön-"Kissan" (2009) was his next release.

The Shahid Kapoor-starrer Paathshala (2010) is his release. His roles and movies he played roles. 2007 Nanhe Jaisalmer as Nanhe / Vikram Singh 2008 Heroes as Salman and Preeti's son 2009 Vaada Raha as Roshan 2010 Paathshala as Vijay Damodhar 2011 Cycle Kick as Deva Yadav stopped acting since 2011.

== Filmography ==
- 2007 Nanhe Jaisalmer as Nanhe/Vikram Singh
- 2008 Heroes as Young Jassi
- 2009 Vaada Raha as Roshan
- 2009 Kisaan as Young Jiggar Singh
- 2010 Paathshala as Vijay Damodhar
- 2011 Cycle Kick as Deva
