= Mangi Mahal =

- Born: 1 January 1973
- Origin: Village Lambra, Jalandhar, Punjab, India
- Genres: Punjabi, bhangra, romantic, pop
- Occupations: Singer, songwriter, actor
- Years active: 1998–present
- Website: www.mangimahalsinger.com

Mangi Mahal is an Indian Punjabi folk singer.

== Biography ==
Mahal debuted with his album Marhak Jamalo Di. His duet songs are performed with Sudesh Kumari. Mahal's biggest hits are "Sachhi Saunh Lagge", "Jatt Velly", "Jatt Di Charhayi", "Yaar Velly", "Dimand", "Putt Punjabi" and "Jaan". He has 9 studio albums.

His new album will be releasing in April 2014, "Khalse De Guru", Tracks 9 and it will be the label on Dharam Seva Records, Music Waves & T-Series. Music will be composed by Harj Nagra.Mangi Mahal also released latest hit single track "Tralle" with the music label Saa Music.

== Discography ==
Year	Album
2014	Khalse De Guru
2012	Dimand
2009	Jatt Diyan Chartan
2008	Full Kirpa
2007	Haq Bann Daa Ae
2005	Sachi Sounh Lagge
2004	Ikk Pind(Mint Tunes)
2003	Kalli Takkarein
2001	Addi Nachan Wale Di
1999	Marhak Jamalo Di
1998	Tu Sanu Kiven Bhulgi

== Filmography ==
Year	Film	Notes
2013	Dil Sada Luteya Gya	Film Debut
2013	Mitro - Mitro	Under Production
2013	Mohabbtan Sachiyan Ne	Mangi Mahal and Himanshi Khurana
2014	Eh Dil Da Mamala Hai	With Inderjit Nikku, Veena Malik
2014	Yaad Satave 42	With Diljit Dosanjh / Music: Bhinda Aujla

== Single ==
Year	Single	Music	Label
2020	Langar	Rupin Kahlon	Mangi Mahal Music
2019	Bapu	Rupin Kahlon	Speed Records
2017	Trale	Desi Routz	Saa Music
2015	Chooteh Laareh	Bhinda Aujla	MovieBox
2015	Mela	Rupin Kahlon	Crown Media
2015	Raula	Rupin Kahlon	T-Series
2015	Zalma	Jas Sampla	UK Music Records
2014	Choti Da Gabru	Pavneet Birgi	Lokhdun Punjabi
2014	Bhagat Singh	Gurmeet Singh	T-Series
2013	Chartan 2	Rupin Kahlon	Trendz Music
2013	Very Sorry	Pavneet Birgi	Speed Records
2011	Kamli	Aman Hayer	MovieBox
2010	Putt Jatt Da	Rupin Kahlon	Trendz Music
