= Vivek Shauq =

Indian actor (1963–2011)

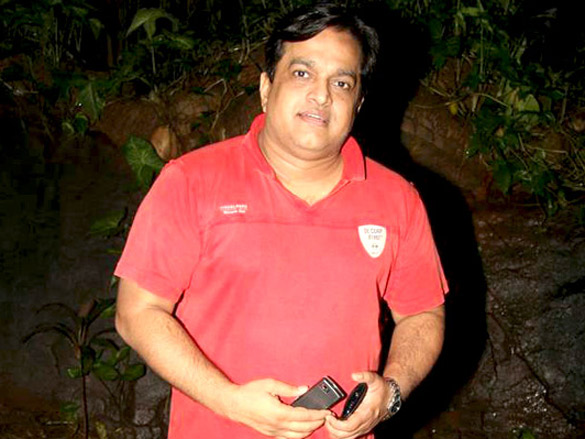
- Vivek Shauq in 2010
- Born: 21 June 1963; Chandigarh, Punjab, India
- Died: 10 January 2011 (aged 47); Thane, Maharashtra, India
- Notable work: Flop Show; Gadar: Ek Prem Katha; Andaaz; Full Tension

Vivek Shauq (21 June 1963 – 10 January 2011) was an Indian actor, comedian, writer and singer. He had acted in Hindi and Punjabi films, television serials, theatre and television commercials. He was also a popular writer and singer. Shauq was also involved with the Sant Nirankari Mission. He was fluent in Urdu. He was also the founding member of the Nonsense Club. He died of a heart attack on 10 January 2011 in Mumbai, at the age of 47.

== Early life ==
Shauq was born on 21 June 1963 in Chandigarh. His father died in 1980 and his mother in the late 80s. He did his study from Indo-Swiss Training Centre (ISTC).

== Career ==
Shauq started his acting career in theatre and television. He starred in Ulta Pulta and Flop Show on Doordarshan, alongside Jaspal Bhatti. He then shifted his focus to Punjabi films and Hindi films. His first Hindi film was Barsaat Ki Raat in 1998. He was also seen in Gadar: Ek Prem Katha. His prominent films included Delhi Heights, Aitraaz, 36 China Town, Hum Ko Deewana Kar Gaye, Asa Nu Maan Watna Da, Dil Hai Tumhaara, Mini Punjab and Nalaik. He had worked with and was greatly influenced by Jaspal Bhatti, who considered him his right-hand man.

== Death ==
He had a heart attack on 3 January 2011 and was admitted to Jupiter Hospital in Thane. He was on life support, but slipped into a coma and could not be revived. On Monday, 10 January 2011, Shauq died from sepsis. His funeral was held on Tuesday, 11 January 2011 at Sant Nirankari Mission.

== Filmography ==
- International Khiladi (1999)
- Mahaul Theek Hai (1999)
- Gadar: Ek Prem Katha (2001)
- Andaaz (2003)
- Aitraaz (2004)
- Asa Nu Maan Watna Da (2004)
- Sadiyaan (2010)
- Delhii Heights (2007)
- Chak De Phatte (2008)
- 36 China Town (2006)
- Humko Deewana Kar Gaye (2006)
- Dil Hai Tumhaara
- Mini Punjab (2009)
- Nalaik
- Dil Deewana
- Bardaasht
- Shabaash! You Can Do It
- Vaada Raha (2009)
- Baabarr (2009)
- Apni Boli Apna Desh
- Life Partner (2009)
- Lagda Ishq Ho Gaya (2009)
- Maharathi (2008)
- Wattna Ton Door
- Satsriakal
- Heroes (2008)
- Haal-e-Dil
- Krazzy 4 (2008)
- Sajna Ve Sajna
- Mitti Vajjan Mardi
- Nanhe Jaisalmer (2007)
- Swami (2007)
- Raqeeb (2007)
- Zindadil
- Unns (2006)
- Utthaan
- Hota Hai Dil Pyar Mein Pagal
- Humko Tumse Pyar Hai
- Vaah! Life Ho To Aisi (2005)
- Yaaran Naal Baharan
- Barsaat
- Shabnam Mausi (2005)
- Tango Charlie (2005)
- Zameer: The Fire Within (2005)
- Jurm (2005)
- Sheesha (2005)
- Kisna (2005)
- Ab Tumhare Hawale Watan Saathiyo (2004) as Col Abhay Sodhi
- Kuchh To Gadbad Hai
- Ek Se Badkar Ek
- Hawas
- Khel
- Koi... Mil Gaya (2003)
- Pran Jaye Per Shan Na Jaye
- Kaash Aap Hamare Hote
- Baaz—A Bird in Danger
- Dum (2003)
- Jee Ayaan Nu (Pun)
- 23 March 1931, Shaheed
- Ab Ke Baras
- Maa Tujhe Salaam
- Indian
- Champion
- Barsaat Ki Raat
- The Lion of Punjab (2011)

=== TV serials ===
- Ulta Pulta directed by Jaspal Bhatti
- Flop Show directed by Jaspal Bhatti
- Full Tension directed by Jaspal Bhatti
- Afsane directed by Lalit Behl

== See also ==
- List of Indian Punjabi films
