= Varyavarati Gandh Pasarla =

Marathi language song by Kunal Ganjawala

Song by Kunal Ganjawala

from the album Savarkhed Ek Gaon
- Language: Marathi
- Released: 2004
- Genre: Filmi
- Length: 4:54
- Label: Video Palace
- Songwriter: Dasu Vaidya
- Composer: Ajay-Atul

Savarkhed Ek Gaon track listing
- 1. "Varyavarati Gandh Pasarla"; 2. "Aai Bhavani Tuzya Krupene"; 3. "Hoshiyaar"

Music video
- Varyavarati Gandh Pasarla Lyrical video on YouTube

"Varyavarati Gandh Pasarla" (transl. The smell wafted on the wind) is a Marathi song sung by Kunal Ganjawala and composed by Ajay-Atul, with lyrics by Dasu Vaidya, for the soundtrack album of the film Savarkhed Ek Gaon. It is picturized on Ankush Chaudhari, Shreyas Talpade, Sonali Khare, Sanjyot Hardikar, and Makarand Anaspure.

== Credits ==
- Kunal Ganjawala – singer
- Ajay-Atul – music composer
- Dasu Vaidya – lyricist
- Video Palace – label

== Reception ==
Vaibhav Joshi of Sakal is described that Ajay-Atul's intro piece has a captivating and invigorating effect. The music's rhythm and melody are so powerful that they make you feel uplifted and rejuvenated. Despite being caught up in the fast pace of city life or a busy mind, the song provides a refreshing escape, transporting you to a simpler, serene village setting with just a touch of its musical charm.
