= Kulraj Randhawa =

Indian actress

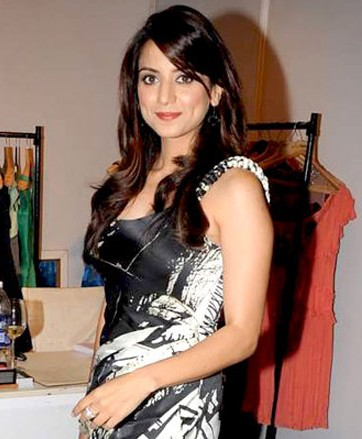
- Randhawa in 2024
- Born: Kulraj Kaur Randhawa; 16 May 1983 (age 43); Dehradun, Uttarakhand, India
- Occupation: Actress

Kulraj Kaur Randhawa (born 16 May 1983) better known as Kulraj Randhawa is an Indian actress who appears in Punjabi and Hindi language films. She is best known for her role as "Kareena" in the TV series Kareena Kareena, and "Saheba" in the Hindi film Yamla Pagla Deewana (2011).

== Early life and career ==
Randhawa was born to a Sikh family in Dehradun, Uttarakhand on 16 May 1983. She did her schooling from Army Public School, Simla. She graduated from Bangalore University with a bachelor's degree in business management. Later, she did a course in acting from Kishore Namit Kapoor's acting school.

== Career ==
She started her career in the 2006 film Mannat with Jimmy Shergill and her Hindi film career with the 2007 film Jaane Bhi Do Yaaro.

== Filmography ==
Films
Year	Title	Role	Language	Notes
2006	Mannat	Prasinn Kaur/Mannat	Punjabi	
2007	Jaane Bhi Do Yaaro	Nishi	Hindi	
2009	Tera Mera Ki Rishta	Rajjo	Punjabi	
2009	Chintuji	Devika Malhotra	Hindi	
2011	Yamla Pagla Deewana	Saheba	Hindi	
2012	Chaar Din Ki Chandni	Chandi Singh	Hindi	
2014	Lucky Kabootar	Laxmi	Hindi	
2014	Double Di Trouble	Ekam's wife	Punjabi	
2016	Needhi Singh	Needhi Singh	Punjabi	
2019	Naukar Vahuti Da	Neetu	Punjabi	
2020	London Confidential	Nirupama Das	Hindi	ZEE5 original film
2021	Oye Mamu!		Hindi	
2023	Tu Hovein Main Hovan	Kelly	Punjabi	
2025	Badaa Karara Pudna		Punjabi	
