= Jaspal Bhatti =

Indian actor (1955–2012)

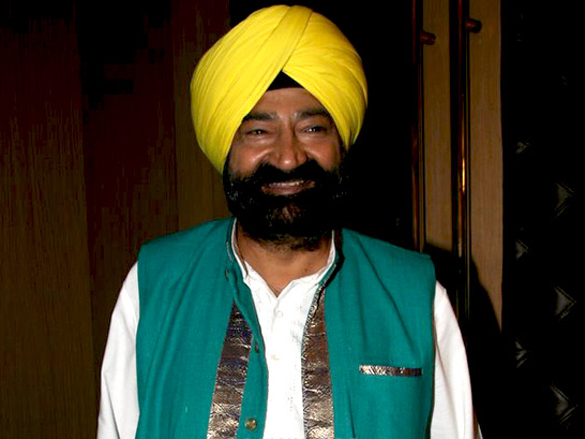
- Born: Jaspal Singh Bhatti; 3 March 1955; Amritsar, Punjab, India
- Died: 25 October 2012 (aged 57); Jalandhar, Punjab, India
- Education: Punjab Engineering College
- Occupations: Actor; director; producer
- Years active: 1985–2012
- Spouse: Savita Bhatti (m. 1985)
- Children: 2
- Relatives: Surilie Gautam (daughter-in-law)
- Honours: Padma Bhushan (2013)

Jaspal Singh Bhatti (3 March 1955 – 25 October 2012) was an Indian television personality known for his satirical take on the problems of the common man. He was most well known for his television series Flop Show, Full Tension and mini capsules Ulta Pulta which ran on Doordarshan, India's public service broadcaster, in the late 1980s and early 1990s. He was commonly known as the "King of Comedy" and also the "King of Satire". He carried out various anti-corruption crusades in Chandigarh. His frontal attack on issues like red-tapism, nepotism, and corruption was both comic and awakening for the masses.

In 2013, he was posthumously awarded the Padma Bhushan, India's third-highest civilian award.

== Early background and personal life ==
Bhatti was born on 3 March 1955 in Amritsar, Punjab in a Punjabi Sikh Rajput family. Bhatti graduated from Punjab Engineering College (PEC) in Chandigarh as an electrical engineer.

Bhatti married Savita Bhatti on 24 March 1985, and has a son, Jasraj Bhatti, and a daughter, Raabiya Bhatti. Savita Bhatti was chosen in the 2014 Indian general elections, as a candidate of the Aam Aadmi Party from Chandigarh, but she opted out.

== Flop Show ==
His low-budget Flop Show, the TV series that debuted in the late 1980s starred his wife Savita Bhatti, who produced the show and acted in all 10 episodes as his wife. The show has cultivated a legacy and is well-remembered. One of his co-actors Vivek Shauq achieved fame after his stint in Flop Show, having found a solid footing in Hindi cinema.

== Subsequent work ==
Bhatti subsequently acted and directed the popular TV series Ulta Pulta and Nonsense Private Limited for Doordarshan network. His show incorporated humour to highlight everyday issues of the middle class in India. Bhatti's satire on the Punjab Police in his film Mahaul Theek Hai (1999) was his first directorial venture for a full-length feature film in his native Punjabi language. He played the role of Jolly Good Singh, a guard, in the movie Fanaa. He played a comical college principal in Koi Mere Dil Se Poochhe. He also starred in the Punjabi comedy film Jijaji.

Bhatti acted in the Hindi film Aa Ab Laut Chalen with Kadar Khan in 1999.

Bhatti also appeared in SAB TV's Comedy ka King Kaun as a judge alongside actress Divya Dutta. Bhatti and his wife Savita also competed in a popular Star Plus show Nach Baliye which went on air in October 2008. The couple demonstrated their dancing and comic skills.

In his later years, Jaspal Bhatti set up a training school and a studio in Mohali near Chandigarh called "Joke Factory".

He also launched a 52-episode comedy series titled Thank You Jijaji on Sony's family entertainment channel, SAB TV. It was shot at his own MAD Arts film school at Chandigarh.

At a 2009 carnival in Chandigarh, Bhatti put up a stall displaying vegetables, pulses and oils. The onlookers were invited to throw rings around them to win these costly goods as prizes, poking fun at the government's failure to control inflation.

In 2009, Bhatti school, Mad Arts, produced an animation film, centered on female foeticide won the second prize in the Advantage India organised by 1take media. It won a certificate of merit at the IDPA-2008 Awards in Mumbai.

Bhatti was granted the Lifetime Achievement Award, at the first Golden Kela Awards.

Jaspal Bhatti was awarded Padma Bhushan by the Government of India, posthumously on Republic Day 2013 for his contribution to the Arts.

== Political satire ==
Bhatti was known for floating his political parties during elections to highlight the problems faced by the general public.

In 1995, he floated the 'Hawala Party' delighting passers-by with his original poker-faced take on growing political corruption in the country which was already a hotly discussed topic in the context of the Jain-Hawala Diaries.

In 2002, Bhatti announced that he was starting the "Suitcase Party" and released his manifesto allotting 5 seats to his family & more seats to be decided based on the suitcase size of the prospective candidates.

In 2009, the comedian announced that he was floating the "Recession Party" and Bhajna Amli, alias Gurdev Dhillon, as his party's face from the Ludhiana. In his trademark satirical style, he kept his party's symbol as opium, drugs and alcohol for which he claimed that there would be no shortage of supply if his party was voted to power.

== Critical response ==
India's leading media critic Amita Malik said of him:

"Bhatti has the correct style for TV, an understated, quiet humour which sinks in without shouting, and which mercilessly exposes both corruption in our everyday life and the typical people, who thrive on it. The grim fact and the hard truths of our society so bitter otherwise are made so funny through the adept handling of Bhatti, that cleansing laughter is created out of common malpractices."

== Death ==
Bhatti died in a car accident near Shahkot in the Jalandhar district on 25 October 2012, aged 57. The car was being driven by his son, Jasraj Bhatti, when it hit a tree. Jaspal died just one day before the release of his film Power Cut starring his son Jasraj.

In his remembrance, his wife Savita Bhatti organised "Jaspal Bhatti Humor Festival" which takes place every year on his birth anniversary in Chandigarh.

== Awards and honours ==
Year	Name	Awarding organisation
2013	Padma Bhushan	Government of India

== Filmography ==
=== As actor ===
- Dil Pardesi Ho Gaya (2013) (Posthumous release)
- Power Cut (2012) – Actor and director
- Dharti (2011) – Surveen's Dad
- Mausam (2011)
- Hum Tum Shabana (2011) Guest appearance
- Chak De Phatte (2009) – Pyara Singh Lovely
- Ek: The Power of One (2009)
- Fanaa (2006) – Jolly Good Singh
- Nalaik (2006) – Daku Mann Singh
- Mera Dil Leke Dekkho (2006)
- Jija Ji (2005) – Jija Ji
- Kuchh Meetha Ho Jaye (2005) – Ram Saran Dubey
- Nalayak (2005)
- Kuch Naa Kaho (2003) – Monty Ahluwalia
- Tujhe Meri Kasam (2003) – Sardarji
- Jaani Dushman: Ek Anokhi Kahani (2002)
- Koi Mere Dil Se Poochhe (2002) – Naraaz Shankar
- Shakti: The Power (2002) – Nandini's uncle
- Yeh Hai Jalwa (2002) – Buta Singh
- Hamara Dil Aapke Paas Hai (2000) – Balwinder (Balu)
- Khauff (2000) – Hava Singh/Dava Singh
- Woh Bewafa Thi (2000)
- Kartoos (1999) – Mini's uncle
- Mahaul Theek Hai (1999)
- Aa Ab Laut Chalen (1999) – Iqbal
- Jaanam Samjha Karo (1999) – Tubby, Rahul's Secretary
- Kaala Samrajya (1999)
- Wanted: Gurdas Mann Dead or Alive (1994) – Thanedaar

=== As director ===
- Mahaul Theek Hai (1999) (Also writer and producer)
- Power Cut (2012) (Also writer and producer)

=== TV serials ===
Title	Role	Notes
Ulta Pulta	Various characters	Also director
Flop Show	Various characters	Also director
Full Tension	Various characters	Also director
Hi Zindagi Bye Zindagi	Bhatti	
Karishma – The Miracles of Destiny		
Dhaba Junction	Dhaba	
Thank you Jijaji	Jijaji	
