= Jaane Bhi Do Yaaron (2007 film) =

- Directed by: Sanjay Sharma
- Written by: Salim Raza
- Produced by: K.C. Sharma
- Starring: Kulraj Randhawa; Kapil Sharma; Sneha Ullal; Anupam Kher; Prem Chopra
- Cinematography: Bashir Ali
- Edited by: Vinod Pathak
- Music by: Bappi Lahiri
- Release date: 28 December 2007
- Country: India
- Language: Hindi

Jaane Bhi Do Yaaron is a 2007 Bollywood comedy film. The film is a lighthearted romantic comedy with a mix of humor and suspense.

== Plot ==
Raja can be best described as a grown-up version of "Dennis the menace" and all neighbors, professors, principal and even his father, who is incidentally a Police Commissioner is not spared by his mischievous pranks. His father hatches a plan to teach him a lesson. He somehow convinces Raja to go his uncle's house in Dehradun for a holiday. His uncle is a no nonsense strict disciplinarian military man and probably the only person, who can instill some discipline and focus in the wavered life and attitude of Raja.

Nisha is a con artist who manages to escape with diamonds worth ₹100 crore after she betrays a notorious gang leader. Then unexpectedly Nisha meets Raja, who's a mischievous prankster. From that moment the journey becomes an adventure full of comedy, danger, thrilling chases and an unexpected romance.

== Cast ==
- Kulraj Randhawa aa Nisha
- Kapil Sharma as Raja
- Anupam Kher as Lama
- Dilip Joshi as Lalwani
- Vijay Raaz as Gangu Bhai
- Govind Namdev as Guladeen
- Dinesh Hingoo as Pyarelal
- Rajesh Vivek as Pandit Kishore
- Makarand Deshpande as Jojo
- Sneha Ullal in Special appearance

== Music ==
Bappi Lahiri has once again lent his iconic voice, this time for Kapil Sharma’s track “Are You Ready.” According to insiders, Bappi Da was highly impressed by Kapil’s dance moves, which took him on a nostalgic trip back to the Mithun Chakraborty era, recalling the vibrant grooves of the “Disco Dancer” days. There have been two songs announced to be in the film that are composed by Bappi Lahiri:

- "Pagh Ghungroo Bandh Meera Naachi Thi" - Daler Mehndi
- "Tu Hi Mera Pyar Hai" - Abhijeet Bhattacharya and Shreya Ghoshal
