= Samir Karnik =

Indian film director, producer and screenwriter

- Occupations: Director, Producer, Screenwriter
- Years active: 2002–present

Samir Karnik is an Indian film director, producer and screenwriter of Hindi films.

== Career ==
Karnik made his directorial debut with the film Kyun! Ho Gaya Na... in 2004 starring Aishwarya Rai and Vivek Oberoi. He produced and directed the film Heroes in 2008.

His directorial venture Yamla Pagla Deewana starring Dharmendra, Sunny Deol and Bobby Deol was released on 14 January 2011.

== Filmography ==
Year	Title	Director	Producer	Writer	Notes	Ref.
2004	Kyun! Ho Gaya Na...	Yes	No	Yes		
2007	Nanhe Jaisalmer	Yes	No	Yes		
2008	Heroes	Yes	Yes	Yes		
2009	Vaada Raha	Yes	No	Yes		
2011	Yamla Pagla Deewana	Yes	Yes	No		
2012	Chaar Din Ki Chandni	Yes	Yes	No		
