= Kunal Ganjawala =

Indian singer (born 1972)

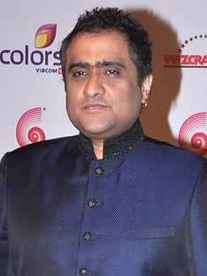
- Ganjawala in 2012

Background information
- Born: 14 April 1972 (age 54); Pune, Maharashtra, India
- Genres: Pop, Jazz, Rock, Bollywood
- Occupation: Singer
- Years active: 1996–present
- Spouse: Gayatri Iyer (m. 2005)

Kunal Ganjawala (born 14 April 1972) is an Indian playback singer whose songs are mostly featured in Hindi and Kannada films. He has also sung in other official languages of India. Kunal began his career by singing jingles. He came to limelight in Hindi cinema with the song "Bheege Honth Tere" from the film Murder in 2004. It was his first big hit. The song earned him Zee Cine Award as Best Playback Singer in 2005. He came to limelight in Kannada cinema with the song "Neene Neene" from the film Aakash in 2005.

== Career ==
Ganjawala graduated from St. Peter's School, Maza Gaon, Mazagaon. Kunal wanted to be either a chartered accountant or an actor. Kunal admits that it was his parents' support which made him possible to become a singer. Kunal's sister is a Bharatnatyam exponent, while his father plays the harmonica. With his parents' support he took singing seriously and started believing that he can become a singer.

Later, Ganjawala learned music from Bharatiya Vidya Bhavan under the guidance of Sudhindra Bhaumick. His first singing assignment was a Ranjit Barot-composed jingle titled Doodh Doodh for the Operation Flood advertisement. Ganjawala has said that he was taken seriously by other music directors because he was working with Barot.

Ganjawala's first break in Bollywood was Ab Ke Baras in 2002. Although the song did not mark him as a prominent singer, it earned him many offers. Thereafter he sang in many movies, such as Saathiya (2002), Indian Babu (2003), Paisa Vasool (2004), Khakee (2004), Rudraksh (2004), Dhoom (2004) and Meenaxi (2004). His breakthrough hit was "Bheege Hont Tere", from the film Murder, which won the 2005 Zee Cine Award Best Playback Singer – Male and IIFA Best Male Playback Award.

Ganjawala entered the Kannada film industry in 2005. His very first song in Kannada, Neene Neene composed by music director R P Patnaik and written by K. Kalyan for the movie Akash, was a hit of the year. His big break in South India came in 2006 from the Kannada blockbuster film Mungaru Male. His song "Onde Ondu Sari" written by Kaviraj and composed by music director Mano Murthy became the biggest hit of the year. It created records, including for highest sales and downloads.

Popular singer Sonu Nigam who is also known in South India for his hundreds of Kannada songs, recently composed a theme song for the Karnataka Bulldozer's team in the Celebrity Cricket League. With lyrics by Sowmya Raoh, this was sung by the trio of Ganjawala, Nigam and Raoh. Ganjawala has sung nearly 450 Kannada Songs thus far.

He has participated in Saregama, an Indian singing talent competition on Zee TV (now Sa Re Ga Ma Pa) when it was hosted by Nigam. He was a judge on Amul Star Voice of India, another singing competition on Star TV, together with Shreya Ghoshal and Pritam.

Since then Ganjawala has worked for many music directors like Anu Malik, Anand–Milind, Nadeem-Shravan, Pritam, Himesh Reshammiya, Ismail Darbar, Shankar–Ehsaan–Loy, Anand Raj Anand, Rajesh Roshan, Viju Shah, Aadesh Shrivastava, Roop Kumar Rathod, Daboo Malik, and Sanjeev-Darshan. Kunal recently sang for Sanjay Leela Bhansali's Saawariya. His numbers from the films Maashah Alaah and Pari were running top on the chart.

Other than Hindi and Kannada, he has also sung in Tamil, Marathi, Punjabi, Odia, Bengali, Telugu, Malayalam, Assamese and Sindhi languages.

His song "Oh my love" from Bengali language movie Amanush Jeet Gannguli and "Channa Ve Ghar aa jaa" from a Punjabi album Channa Ve by DJ Anit & Music director Santokh Singh was also a success.

In 2007, he participated in a concert tour in North America, called The Incredibles, also featuring Asha Bhosle, Nigam and Kailash Kher.

On 3 April 2010 he performed at RECSTACY, the annual cultural event of NIT DURGAPUR. On 26 November 2010 he performed at SDM UTSAV, the mega fest event of SDMCET.

In February 2018, he recorded India's first jazzy ghazal Dhatt, for the Indian recording label Indian Talkie. The song was composed by Sumit and written by Zeest and is a blend of two completely different genres, Jazz and Ghazal. The song was released on Valentine's Day 2018 to over 300 music streaming platforms, including Saavn, iTunes Spotify, Deezer, and Wynk Music. The Lyrical Making Video was released on Indian Talkie's official YouTube Channel, featuring Ganjawala and Sumit and his team.

== Personal life ==
In 2005, he married fellow singer Gayatri Iyer. They performed the title track for STAR One's Antakshari together. He is a staunch devotee of Sri Sathya Sai Baba.

== Awards and recognition ==
Kunal Ganjawala has received the following recognitions:

Year	Nominee / work	Award	Result
2005	Murder	Filmfare Awards "Best Male Playback Singer" "RD Burman Award for New Music Talent" (For: Bheege Honth Tere)	Won
2005	Murder	IIFA Awards "Best Male Playback" (For: Bheege Honth Tere)	Won
2005	Murder	Zee Cine Awards "Best Playback Singer – Male" (For: Bheege Honth Tere)	Won
2006	Murder	Star Guild Awards "Best Male Playback Singer" (For: Bheege Honth Tere)	Won
2006	Murder	Bollywood Movie Awards "Bollywood Movie Award – Best Playback Singer Male" (For: Bheege Honth Tere)	Won
2009	Mussanjemaatu	56th Filmfare Awards South "Best Male Playback Singer" (For: Kaddalu Mansana)	Nominated

== Discography ==
=== Hindi ===
Year	Movie	Song(s)
1996	Saajan Chale Sasural	"Main Hoon Number Ek Gawaiyya"
1998	Saat Rang Ke Sapne	"Mujh Pe Bhi Jawani"
2001	Aks	"Banda Bindaas"
2002	Saathiya	"O Humdum Soniyo Re"
2002	Yeh Kya Ho Raha Hai?	"Yaar Apne Ghar Jao"
2002	Badhaai Ho Badhaai	"Jogan Jogan"
2002	Ab Ke Baras	"Deewane Aate Jaate"
2002	Om Jai Jagadish	"Chori Chori Dekha Tumhe"
2003	Rules: Pyaar Ka Superhit Formula	"Chodo Na Mujhe"
2003	Saaya	"Har Taraf Har Jagah"
2003	Mumbai Matinee	"Tu (Version A)", "Tu (Version B)"
2004	Murder	"Bheege Honth Tere"
2004	Kyun! Ho Gaya Na...	"No No!"
2004	Taarzan: The Wonder Car	"Gonna Fall In Love"
2004	Musafir	"Ek Dil Ne"
2004	Lakeer	"Nachley", "Shehzade"
2004	Khakee	"Uppar Wale"
2004	Run	"Nahin Hona Nahin Hona"
2004	Gayab	"Gayab Hoke", "Dilkash"
2004	Dhoom	"Salaame"
2004	Lakshya	"Kandhon Se Milte Hai"
2004	Uuf Kya Jaadoo Mohabbat Hai	"Shukriya", "Dost", "Shehzaadi"
2004	Balle Balle! From Amritsar To L.A.	"Lo Shaadi Aayi"
2004	Bardaasht	"Janaabe Ali", "Na Na Na Na Re"
2005	Kya Kool Hai Hum	"Kya Kool Hai Hum (Title Song)", "Chaska", "We Are So Different"
2005	Deewane Huye Paagal	"Aisi Umar Mein"
2005	Tango Charlie	"Akkad Te Bakkad Te"
2005	Kuchh Meetha Ho Jaye	"O Jaana Tenu Rab Da"
2005	Kyon Ki	"Dil Keh Raha Hai"
2005	Kaal	"Kaal Dhamaal, Tauba Tauba"
2005	Silsiilay	"Ban Jaiye", "Meri Jaan"
2005	Socha Na Tha	"Abhi Abhi (Version 1)"
2005	Salaam Namaste	"Salaam Namaste", "What's going on"
2005	Sheesha	"Yaar Ko Maine", "Mujhe Jeena Sikha Do na"
2005	Chehraa	"Mausam Ki Izazat Hai"
2005	Dansh	"Saje Hain Sapnon Ke"
2005	Fareb	"Pehle Se"
2005	Fun - Can Be Dangerous Sometimes	"Jal Raha Hai Badan"
2005	Vaah! Life Ho Toh Aisi!	"Koi Aap Jaisa"
2005	Bachke Rehna Re Baba	"Tera Husn Woh Nasha Hai"
2005	Ek Khiladi Ek Haseena	"Ishq Hai Jhootha"
2005	Insan	"Is Tarah Deewane"
2006	Woh Lamhe	"So Jaoon Main (Male version)"
2006	Chup Chup Ke	"Aaya Re", "Dil Vich Lagya Ve", "Tumhi Se" (Unplugged)
2006	Bhagam Bhag	"Tere Bin", "Tere Bin (Remix)"
2006	Ankahee	"Tumse Yun Milenge", "Ankahee"
2006	Yun Hota Toh Kya Hota	"Yun Hota Toh Kya Hota"
2006	Pyaar Ke Side Effects	"Is This Love"
2006	Ladies Tailor	"Har Raat teri"
2006	Anthony Kaun Hai?	"Tune Mera Chain Vain Le Liya", "Because I Love You"
2006	Pyare Mohan	"I Love You My Angel"
2006	Phir Hera Pheri	"Dil De diya", "Dil De Diya (Remix Version)"
2006	Krrish	"Dil Na Diya"
2006	Jaan-E-Mann	"Ud Jaana"
2006	Baabul	"Har Manzar", "Bebashi Dard Ka Aalam"
2006	Aryan: Unbreakable	"Rab Ne Mere"
2006	Holiday	"Khwaahishon Se"
2006	Aksar	"Loot Jaayenge"
2006	Tom, Dick, and Harry	"O Mitra Re"
2006	Aisa Kyon Hota Hai?	"Ishq Dhamaka"
2006	Mera Dil Leke Dekkho	"Nashe Mein Bheegi Raat Hai", "Nashe Mein Bheegi Raat Hai" (The Dance Mix Version)
2007	Shakalaka Boom Boom	"Saathiya", "Tera Sona Sona Roop"
2007	Salaam-E-Ishq	"Salaam-E-Ishq"
2007	Partner	"Dupatta Tera Nau Rang Da"
2007	Big Brother	"Piya"
2007	Fear	"Dil Dhadkata Hai"
2007	Mr. Hot Mr. Kool	"Mr. Hot Mr. Kool", "Hot Cool" (Techno Mix Version)
2007	Saawariya	"Masha-Allah", "Jaan-E-Jaan", "Pari"
2007	Khanna & Iyer	"Rootho Naa", "Raasta Pyaar Ka", "Raasta Pyaar Ka (Remix Version)"
2007	Go	"Go", "So Cool", "Dhan Tan Tan"
2007	Fool & Final	"Tere Layee"
2007	Dhol	"Namakool"
2007	Raqeeb	"Dushmana (Male)"
2008	Roadside Romeo	"Main Hoon Romeo", "Apni Dum Bhi Oonchi Ho"
2008	Love Story 2050	"Sach Kehna"
2008	Jumbo	"Everything's Gonna Be Alright"
2008	Hastey Hastey	"New Age Mantra (Version 1)", "New Age Mantra (Male)", "Bheegi Bheegi Teri Julfein"
2008	Dashavatar	"O Mohini O Kamini"
2008	Ru Ba Ru	"Mitti Ki Khusboo"
2008	Mission Istaanbul	"World Hold On"
2008	Mr. Black Mr. White	"Namasteji"
2008	Maan Gaye Mughal-e-Azam	"Marmari Bahein"
2008	Money Hai Toh Honey Hai	"Ta Na Na"
2009	Kaminey	"Raat Ke Dhai Baje", "Raat Ke Dhai Baje" (remix)
2009	Aao Wish Karein	"Tum Mere Ho", "Sab Yahan Hain", "Sabse peeche Hum Khade"
2009	Vaada Raha	"Achal Hai Mere Hausle"
2009	Life Partner	"Poorza Poorza", "Poorza Poorza (Remix Version)"
2009	Fox	"Zindagi Mein Mil Rahi Hai", "Advocate De Satan", "Josh Josh"
2009	Suno Na	"Pal Aaya Suhana"
2009	All The Best: Fun Begins	"You Are My Love"
2010	Raavan	"Kata Kata"
2010	Khatta Meetha	"Nana Chi Taang"
2010	Chance Pe Dance	"One More Dance", "Yaba Daba Yahoo"
2010	Tum Milo Toh Sahi	"I Am Bad"
2010	Guzarish	"Sau Gram Zindagi"
2010	Sadiyaan	"Pehla Pehla Tajurba Hai"
2010	Diwangi Ne Had Kar Di	"Diwangi Ne Had Kar Di"
2010	Musaa	"Jaaniya Teri Hansi Adaa"
2010	Isi Life Mein...!	"Tere Pyar Mein"
2011	Dil Toh Bachcha Hai Ji	"Beshuba Beshuba Hai Yakeen", "Jadugari"
2011	Aashiqui.in	"Ruk ke Jaana", "Ruk Ke Jaana Reloaded!"
2011	Singham	"Maula Maula"
2011	Love U...Mr. Kalakaar!	"Bhoore Bhoore Badal"
2011	Yeh Saali Zindagi	"Yeh Saali Zindagi (Duet Version)"
2011	My Friend Pinto	"Take It Easy", "Do Kabootar", "Dhinchak Zindagi"
2012	Koochie Koochie Hota Hai	"Koi Mil Gaya"
2012	Qasam Se Qasam Se	"Mumkin Nahi"
2012	Pune tc	"Manzil Meri Kya Hai"
2013	R... Rajkumar	"Mat Maari"
2013	Four Two Ka One	"Sundari"
2014	Dishkiyaoon	"Tu Mere Type Ka Nahi Hai"
2014	Holiday: A Soldier Is Never Off Duty	"Tu Hi Toh Hai (Film Version)"
2014	18.11: A Code of Secrecy	"Yeh Zameen"
2015	Chehere: A Modern Day Classic	"Chaand Baadal Mein"
2015	Ranviir the Marshal	"Saware Naino"
2015	Hogaya Dimaagh Ka Dahi	"Dimaagh Ka Dahi"
2016	Deewaren: Unity Song	"Deewaren"
2016	Love Shagun	"Saathiya"
2017	Rangoon	"Julia"
2017	Luv Shv Pyar Vyar	"Jism"
2018	Zero	"Aan Ban"
2019	Panipat	"Jai Mard Maratha", "Mann Mein Shiva"
2021	Oye Mamu!	"Mama Mama", "Bandh Liya", "Too Much Paisa"
2022	Kahani Rubberband Ki	"Chomu"
2024	The Greatest of All Time (Hindi version)	"Spark"
2024	Naam (2024 film)	Laila

=== Non-film ===
Year	Song	Album
2003	"Honey Honey", "Pyaar Ke Pench"	Tera Meraa Dil
2005	"Channa Ve Ghar Aaja Ve", "Zara Zara"	Channa Ve
2005	"Kaisa Ye Pyar Hai"	Kaisa Ye Pyar Hai
2006	"Left Right Left"	Left Right Left
2006	"Naye Zamane Ka"	Nakhra Husn Ka
2011	"Teri Aankhen"	Teri Aankhen
2013	"Pungi Premachi"	Pungi Premachi
2018	"Dhatt"	Dhatt (singles)
2020	"Man Bhaitaad"	Man Bhaitaad (Marathi single)
2021	"Bhannat Porgi"	Bhannat Porgi (Marathi single)
2022	"Majhi Jaanu"	Mi Single 2.0 (Marathi album)
2024	"Khuleaam Ishq"	Khuleaam Ishq (Marathi single)

=== Kannada ===
Date	Film	Song	Composer
2005	Akash	"Neene Neene" and "O Mariya"	R. P. Patnaik
2006	Mungaru Male	"Onde Ondu Sari"	Mano Murthy
2006	Aishwarya	"Aishwarya Aishwarya" and "Hudugi Hudugi"	Rajesh Ramnath
2006	Mohini 9886788888	"Preethiyalli naanu"	Hamsalekha
2006	Ganda Hendathi	"Nidiregu Raja" and "Maathu Muride"	Gurukiran
2006	Suntaragaali	"Ninnane Ninnane"	Sadhu Kokila
2006	Sevanthi Sevanthi	"Bhagyada Balegara" and "Nimbiya Banada Myagada"	S. A. Rajkumar
2006	Dattha	"Manasa Manasa" and "Ee Soundaryakke"	R. P. Patnaik
2006	Tananam Tananam	"Cheluvantha Rajakumari" and "Preethi Endarenu"	K. Kalyan
2006	Julie	"Nanna Ninna Preethiyalli"	
2006	Hubli	"Ninna Manassigendu"	A. R. Hemanth
2006	Pandavaru	"Kaayuthaliruva Kannige"	
2006	Tenali Rama	"Neene Neene"	
2006	Ravi Shastri	"Gilli Gilli"	
2006	Uppi Dada M.B.B.S.	"Preethse"	
2006	Ajay	"Enayitu Nanageedina"	Mani Sharma
2006	Student	"Appa Amma Beda Andre"	R. P. Patnaik
2006	Kallarali Hoovagi	"Nanna Nechhina Koteya" and "Barappa O Thingala Mava"	
2006	Thangigagi	"Dina Dina"	
2006	Thavarina Siri	"Aakashadinda Ilida Apsare"	
2007	Milana	"Kivi Mathondu"	Mano Murthy
2007	Cheluvina Chithara	"Iralaare Cheluve"	Mano Murthy
2007	Ee Bandhana	"Banna Banna"	Mano Murthy
2007	Chanda	"Enaitho Nanagenaitho"	
2007	Arasu	"Ninna Kanda Kshanadinda"	
2007	Bhupathi	"Abhi Abhi"	V. Harikrishna
2007	Soundarya	"Hrudayada Maathu"	
2007	Vidhyarthi	"Enaitho Eno"	
2007	Ninade Nenapu	"Heegeke"	
2007	Amrutha Vaani	"Hrudaya Haduthide"	
2007	Ee Preethi Yeke Bhoomi Melide	"Oh Huduga"	
2007	Ninnusire Nannusiru	"Dil Alla"	
2007	Parodi	"Bare Bare"	
2007	Snehana Preethina	"Dhava Dhava"	V. Harikrishna
2007	Thamashegagi	"Rangeela"	
2007	Thayiya Madilu	"Nannavale Nannavale"	
2008	Mussanje Maathu	"Kaddalu Manassanna"	
2008	Haage Summane	"Hadonave"	
2008	Navagraha	"Yaami Yaami"	
2008	Gaalipata	"Aakasha Ishte Yaakideyo"	
2008	Anthu Inthu Preethi Banthu	"Modala Sala"	
2008	Meravanige	"Nannolave"	
2008	Aramane	"Nanagu Ninagu"	
2008	Taj Mahal	"Khushiyaagide Yeko"	
2008	Accident	"Jigidu Banthu"	
2008	Sangathi	"Jagath Sundari"	
2008	Madesha	"Munjane Manjaagu"	
2008	Bandhu Balaga	"Ninna Bittu Naanu"	
2008	Chaitrada Chandrama	"Nooraru Janmada"	
2008	Sihi Muthu	"Eshto Saniha"	
2008	Neene Neene	"I am in Love"	
2008	Pallavi Illada Charana	"Goa da" and "Ee Hoovu"	
2008	Ganga Kaveri	"Baaro Baaro Dosti"	
2008	Gange Baare Thunge Baare	"Hogalu kelive"	
2008	Indra	"Raja Ninnane"	
2008	Maharshi	"Kannali Nee"	
2008	Neenyare	"Makaranda"	
2008	Paramesha Panwala	"Saavira Saavira Janma"	
2008	Priya My Darling	"Pade Pade" and "Kaviya Kanajadinda"	
2008	Rocky	"Olla Ollare Olla"	
2008	Shivani	"Savi Savi preethi"	
2008	Yuga Yugagale Saagali	"Namma Naadu Malnaadu"	
2009	Manasaare	"Ondu Kanassu"	
2009	Male Barali Manju Irali	"Onsala Ondondsala"	
2009	Bhagyada Balegara	"Jhallu Jhallu" and "Balegara Balegara"	Ilaiyaraja
2009	Nannedeya Haadu	"Ninna Preethiyonde Nanage"	
2009	Kempa	"Andhu Omme"	
2009	Kalaakaar	"Bang Bang Bangalore"	
2009	Thaakath	"Doresani Neenu"	
2009	Jaaji Mallige	"Mogave Nee"	
2009	Seena	"Chanchala Notada"	
2009	Rajani	"Pizza Priya Pizza"	
2009	Chickpete Sachagalu	"Navile Navile"	
2009	Chellidaru Sampigeya	"Gelathi"	
2009	Iniya	"Yaarannu"	
2009	10th Class A Sec	"Helokaagthilla"	
2009	Baaji	"Kyare Ladki"	
2009	Ee Sambhashane	"Ondu Becchaneya Nenapu"	
2009	Januma Janumadallu	"Aalangisu"	
2009	Kabaddi	"Preethi Maadiro"	
2009	Maccha	"Fanaa"	
2009	Preethse Preethse	"Preethse Preethse"	
2009	Yagna	"Mana Midiyuva"	
2009	Jeeva	"Beke Beku Nange Neene Beku"	
2009	Hatrick Hodi Maga	"Eno Heluthide"	Jassie Gift
2010	Prithvi	"Ninagende Visheshavaada"	Manikanth Kadri
2010	Super	"Kaayi Kaayi Uppinakaayi"	
2010	Premism	"Gulabi Kennege"	
2010	Suryakaanti	"Edeya Baagilu"	Ilaiyaraja
2010	Cheluveye Ninna Nodalu	"Hamsa Hamsa Hamsalekha"	
2010	Sri Harikathe	"Sari Sari Illellavu"	
2010	Huduga Hudugi	"Usire Ninna"	
2010	Nanjanagoodu Nanjunda	"Laila O Laila"	
2010	Uyyale	"Chinna Nee Nanna"	
2010	Preethi Nee Shaswathana	"Railu Railu"	
2010	Lift Kodla	"Happy Happy Birthday"	
2010	Bindaas Hudugi	"Naa Ninna Nodida"	
2010	Bisile	"Nannusiru neene"	
2010	Chirru	"Oo Lalala"	
2010	Jothegara	"Ondondu Ondondu"	
2010	Porki	"Heegu Unta"	
2010	Preethiya Theru	"Sum Sumne"	
2010	Punda	"Omomme Edurade"	G. V. Prakash Kumar
2010	Shourya	"Kaledu Hoythu"	
2010	Sihigaali	"Hele Thangali"	
2010	Varshadhare	"Beku Bekunta"	B. Ajaneesh Loknath
2010	Zamana	"Madhumagale Ene Ninna Golu"	
2011	Hoori	"Geleya"	
2011	Onde Ondu Sari	"Nenede Naa" and "Sanje Saago"	
2011	Manasina Maathu	"Naaniralu Nannavaleduru"	
2011	Aata	"Hey Yavva"	
2011	Hare Rama Hare Krishna	"Naanondu Gombe"	Ilaiyaraja
2011	Bettada Jeeva	"Beke Beku"	
2012	Preethiya Loka	"Nanna Olavina"	
2012	Parijatha	"Aa Chandrika"	
2012	Ko Ko	"Akasmika Geleyanu"	
2012	Toofan	"Ellinda Banthu"	
2012	Sidlingu	"Achachhu Beladachhu"	
2013	Charminar	"Aa Chigurina"	
2013	Padhe Padhe	"Manasagideyo"	
2014	Aakramana	"Manase Manasa"	
2015	Rana Vikrama	"Ranavikrama title song"	
2015	Bettanagere	"Neeli Neeli"	
2015	Lodde	"Senorita"	
2015	Masterpiece	"Jaago re Jaago"	
2015	Paru I Love You	"Suriyuva Maleyali"	
2016	U The End A	"Tirboki Nannu Tirboki", "Maaye Ee Jagavu"	
2017	Aadu Aata Aadu	"Munjaaneya Manju"	
2018	Bhanta	"Kannalu Neene"	
2019	Bhanu Weds Bhoomi	"Naajuku Manasinalli (Duet)", "Naajuku Manasinalli (Solo)"	
2022	Maha Roudram	"Saturday Nightella"	
2024	Pranayam	"Sameepa"	Mano Murthy
2025	Gajarama	"Saaraayi Shaantamma"	Mano Murthy

=== Bengali ===
Date	Film	Song
2007	Minister Fatakeshto	"Bande Mataram"
2008	Sabdhan Pancha Aashche	"Khudro"
2009	Saat Paake Bandha	"Swapno Jano Pelo Bhasha"
2009	Challenge	"Mahi Ve"
2009	Sathi Amar Bondhu Amar	Elo Melo Matal Hawa
2009	Prem Aamar	"Prem Aamar Title", "Uru Uru Swapne", "Kon Bhule Tumi", "Tumi Chara Aj Eka" and "Shob Rong Muche"
2010	Amanush	"O My Love "
2010	Dui Prithibi	"O Yara Ve" and "Its Only Pyar"
2010	Le Chakka	"Shabba Rabba Reeba Ru", "Ekta Bindas Para" and "Le Chakka Title"
2010	Mon Je Kore Uru Uru	"Mon Je Kore Uru Uru"
2010	Paapi	"Cholche Raban Raj" and "Paapi Paapi"
2010	Shedin Dekha Hoyechilo	"Sedin Dekha Hoyechilo"
2010	Wanted	"Ekhono Jeno" and "Koro Selam"
2011	Faande Poriya Boga Kaande Re	"Jani Na"
2011	Star Jalsha Parivaar Award	"Title Track"
2011	Fighter	"Mon Banjara" and "O Shona E Shona"
2011	Kolkata The Metro Life	"মনে আলো মেলো হাওয়া"
2011	Paglu	"Mon Bebagi"
2012	Khokababu	"Elo Melo"
2012	Macho Mustanaa	"Bailamos", "Jane Jana"
2012	Jaaneman	"Kichu Halka"
2012	Bawali Unlimited	"Mon Ure Chole"
2012	Le Halua Le	"Love You Love You"
2013	Kanamachi	"Beporowa Mone" and "Kanamachi To"
2019	Prem Amar 2	"Title Track"

=== Tamil ===
Date	Film	Song	Composer
2003	Enakku 20 Unakku 18	"Kama Kama"	A. R. Rahman
2003	Boys	"Please Sir" and "Maaro Maaro"	A. R. Rahman
2004	New	"Spider Man"	A. R. Rahman
2004	Kuthu	"Pachai Kili"	Srikanth Deva
2004	7G Rainbow Colony	"January Madham"	Yuvan Shankar Raja
2004	Pudhukottayilirundhu Saravanan	"Pudhukkottai Saravanan"	Yuvan Shankar Raja
2005	Ponniyin Selvan	"Do Re Me"	Vidyasagar
2006	Thimiru	"Kattikko Rappa Rappa"	Yuvan Shankar Raja
2006	Dhoom 2 (Tamil Version)	"Touch Me"	Pritam
2006	Krrish (Tamil Version)	"Dil Illiya"	Rajesh Roshan
2006	Mercury Pookkal	"Mugurtha Neeram"	Karthik Raja
2007	Urchagam	"Veyyil" and "Nanba Nanba"	Ranjit Barot
2009	Naan Kadavul	"Maa ganga"	Ilayaraja
2013	Singam 2	"Kannukkulle"	Devi Sri Prasad

=== Telugu ===
Year	Film	Song	Composer(s)
2003	Nee Manasu Naaku Telusu	"Kama Kama"	A. R. Rahman
2003	Boys	"Maro Maro"	A. R. Rahman
2003	Boys	"Please Sir"	A. R. Rahman
2004	Naani	"Spiderman"	A. R. Rahman
2004	7G Brundavan Colony	"Mem Vaysuku"	Yuvan Shankar Raja
2004	7G Brundavan Colony	"January Masaam"	Yuvan Shankar Raja
2005	Balu ABCDEFG	"Hut Hutja"	Mani Sharma
2005	Aparichithudu	"Naaku Neeku"	Harris Jayaraj
2006	Dhoom 2	"Touch Me"	Pritam Chakraborty
2006	Sarada Saradaga	"Yenno Janma Janmalanunchi"	S. V. Krishna Reddy
2006	Pokiri	"Jagadame"	Mani Sharma
2006	Chukkallo Chandrudu	"Navvuthu Ringtone"	Chakri
2006	Krrish	"Gunde Aadina"	Rajesh Roshan
2008	Vinayakudu	"Naalo Vedane"	Sam Prasan
2008	Ready	"Tu Tu Tu"	Devi Sri Prasad
2008	Krishna	"Dil Maange More"	Chakri
2009	Arya 2	"Karige Loga"	Devi Sri Prasad
2009	Ganesh Just Ganesh	"Raja Kumari"	Mickey J. Meyer
2009	Josh	"Diridiri Diridiri"	Sandeep Chowta
2010	Taj Mahal	"Etu Chusina"	Abhimann Roy
2010	Simha	"Janaki Janaki"	Chakri
2010	Adhurs	"Neethone"	Devi Sri Prasad
2010	Om Shanti	"Chinna Polikey" (duet version)	Ilaiyaraaja
2010	Om Shanti	"Chinna Polikey" (male version)	Ilaiyaraaja
2012	Naa Ishtam	"Naa Ishtam"	Chakri
2014	Heart Attack	"Endhukila Nannu Vedhisthunavey"	Anup Rubens
2014	Veta	"I Love You Antunna"	Chakri
2014	Run Raja Run	"Coma Coma Coma"	Ghibran
2015	Jadoogadu	"Kadha Kudirega"	Mahathi Sagar
2025	Subham	"Vellipove"	Shor Police

=== Marathi ===
Date	Film	Song	Composer
2004	Savarkhed Ek Gaon	"Varyavarati Gandh Pasarla"	Ajay-Atul
2006	Shubhmangal Savdhan	"Oath Olawale"	Anil Mohile
2007	Saade Maade Teen	"Saade Maade Teen"	Ajay-Atul
2007	Zabardast	"Aaicha Gho"	Ajay-Atul
2008	Uladhaal	"Dena Paisa Dena"	Ajay-Atul
2009	Gaiir	"Tu Ye Na Priye"	Avinash–Vishwajeet
2010	Ringa Ringa	"Bayago Bayago"	Ajay-Atul
2011	Arjun	"He Shwas Tuze"	Lalit Sen
2013	Thoda Tuza Thoda Maza	"Tension Chya Bailala Dhol"	Tubby
2013	Vanshvel	"Ti Jakham Juni"	Amitraj
2013	Lagna Pahave Karun	"Tu Shwaas Sare"	Ajay Naik
2014	Lai Bhaari	"New Nava Tarana"	Ajay-Atul
2016	Jaundya Na Balasaheb	"Mona Darling"	Ajay-Atul
2017	Nagarsevak - Ek Nayak	"Man Kaware Bavare	Dev-Ashish
2019	VIP Gadhav	"VIP VIP"	Ravi Wavhole
2019	Khari Biscuit	"Khari"	Suraj-Dhiraj
2022	Samrenu	"Jhimmad"	Suraj-Dhiraj
2022	Aathava Rang Premacha	"Aaik Na"	Prini Siddhant Madhav
2024	Sridevi Prasanna	"Ajun Koni Aahe Ka?"	Amitraj
2025	GauriShankar	"Sukh Aale"	Prashant-Nishant
2026	Aga Aga Sunbai! Kay Mhantay Sasubai?	"Divas Tuze He Phulauche"	Kunal Karan; Devdutta Baji; Suraj Dhiraj
2026	Swapnasundari	"Shodhu Kuthe Navri"	Ankush Boradkar

=== Punjabi ===
Date	Film	Song
2011	I Am Singh	"Turban Victory"
2013	Pooja Kiven AA	"Shayad Eh Pyaar"
2013	Saadi Love Story	Title track

=== Malayalam ===
Date	Film	Song	Composer
2013	5 Sundarikal	"Ekantham Janmam"	Gopi Sunder

=== Odia ===
Date	Film	Song
2007	Tumaku Paruni Ta Bhuli	"Aare Aare Mo Geetare Mitare Aare" and "E Jibana Emiti Suna Geetatiere"
2013	Kehi Jane Bhala Lagere	"O Sona"

=== Urdu ===
Date	Film	Song
2015	Halla Gulla	"Halla Gulla", "Thumka"

=== Assamese ===
Year	Album	Song	Composer(s)	Writer(s)	Co-singer(s)	Ref.
2006	Meghor Aare Aare	"Suwali Dhunia"			Solo	
2006	Meghor Aare Aare	"Meghor Aare Aare"			Solo	

=== Tulu ===
Date	Film	Song
2016	Pilibail Yamunakka	"Cheepedha Naal Padha"
