= Oye Mamu! =

2021 Indian film by Vikram Singh

- Official release poster
- Directed by: Vikram Singh
- Written by: Vikram Singh
- Produced by: Dilip Bafna; Nikhil Panchamiya
- Starring: Ruslaan Mumtaz; Kulraj Randhawa; Asrani; Gulshan Grover; Tiku Talsania; Mohit Daga
- Cinematography: Hiroo Keswani
- Edited by: Sanjay Sankla
- Music by: Sandesh Shandilya
- Production company: Fourth Wall Entertainment
- Distributed by: BookMyShow Stream
- Release date: 6 August 2021
- Country: India
- Language: Hindi

Oye Mamu! is a 2021 Indian Hindi-languagE comedy film directed by Vikram Singh. The film stars Ruslaan Mumtaz, Kulraj Randhawa, Asrani, Gulshan Grover, Tiku Talsania, and Mohit Daga. Described as a lighthearted slapstick comedy, the story follows a young boy and his eccentric uncle who become entangled in a comical heist.

== Plot ==
Rohit, fondly known as Mamu (played by Ruslaan Mumtaz), is a man with big dreams of wealth. Unfortunately, his ambitious ventures have left him financially ruined. On the other hand, Akhil (Tanay Chheda), his mischievous 10-year-old nephew, is full of energy and always up to something. The two don’t get along well, as Rohit often finds himself on the receiving end of Akhil's elaborate pranks.

Circumstances force Mamu and Bhanja to live together for two weeks, turning their daily life into a chaotic series of battles and schemes. Rohit tries to instill discipline, but Akhil, ever the trickster, usually turns the tables. Meanwhile, Akhil harbors a secret dream of becoming a video jockey, which sets the stage for unexpected twists involving a school trip to a museum, a stolen diamond, police chases, and bumbling criminals.

== Cast ==
- Ruslaan Mumtaz as Rohit / Mamu
- Kulraj Randhawa
- Tanay Chheda as Akhil
- Gulshan Grover
- Asrani
- Tiku Talsania
- Mohit Daga

== Release ==
The film was released on 6 August 2021 on transactional video on demand on BookMyShow Stream.

== Reception ==
Ottplay rated the film 1.5 out of 5 stars and criticized it for its over-the-top acting and dated comedic style. The reviewer wrote that "the film might have worked in the 90s but failed… it appears to be a tribute (or rather mockery) of 90s films with an over-the-top style and an unnatural storyline that doesn’t do it any favors."
