= Rajinder =

Given name

Rajinder is a given name. Notable people with the name include:

- Rajinder Birdi or Roger Verdi (born 1953), retired English professional footballer
- Rajinder Kaur Bhattal, Indian Congress politician
- Rajinder Kaur Bulara (born 1946), Indian politician
- Rajinder Dhawan or David Dhawan, Indian film director
- Rajinder Garg (born 1966), Indian politician
- Rajinder Ghai (born 1960), former Indian cricketer
- Rajinder Goel (born 1942), former cricketer who holds the record for most wickets in Ranji Trophy
- Rajinder Gupta (born 1959), Indian politician and industrialist
- Rajinder Hans (born 1953), in Mumbai is a former Indian first class cricketer
- Rajinder Krishan (1919–1988), Indian poet, lyricist and screenwriter
- Rajinder Pal (born 1937), former Indian cricketer
- Rajinder Paul Loomba, CBE (born 1943), philanthropist, founder and Executive Chairman of Rinku Group
- Rajinder Rai (born 1975), British Indian musician
- Rajinder Sachar (born 1923), Indian lawyer and a former Chief Justice of the Delhi High Court
- Rajinder Singh (disambiguation), multiple people
- Rajinder Singh (Sant Mat) (born 1946), head of Science of Spirituality and of the Sawan Kirpal Ruhani Mission
- Rajinder Singh Bedi (1915–1984), Urdu writer, playwright and Hindi film director, screenwriter and dialogue writer
- Rajinder Singh Sarkaria (1916–2007), Indian Supreme Court justice from 1973 to 1981

== See also ==
- Rajinder Nagar, posh residential neighborhood located in Central Delhi, India
