= Vineet =

Vineeth
- Gender: Male and Female

Origin
- Meaning: modest one
- Region of origin: India

Other names
- Alternative spelling: Vineeth or Vinit

Vineet, alternatively Vineeth, is an Indian name. Notable people with the name include:

== Vineet ==
- Vineet Alurkar, Indian musician
- Vineet M. Arora, American medical researcher
- Vineet Jain, Indian businessman, managing director of Bennett, Coleman & Co. Ltd.
- Vineet Jain (cricketer), Indian cricketer
- Vineet Kothari, Indian judge
- Vineet Kumar, Indian actor
- Vineet Kumar Singh, Indian actor

== Vineeth ==
- Vineeth Sreenivasan, Indian film actor, producer, director, scriptwriter and singer
- Vineeth Kumar, Indian film actor and director
- C. K. Vineeth, Indian professional footballer
- Vineeth Vincent, Indian beatboxer
- Vineeth Radhakrishnan, Indian film actor, classical dancer, voice artist and choreographer
- Vineeth Revi Mathew, Indian basketball player
- Vineeth Mohan, Indian film actor
