= The Legend of Hanuman =

Indian animated mythological television series (Web Series)

- Promotional poster
- Genre: Epic
- Created by: Sharad Devarajan; Jeevan J. Kang; Charuvi Agrawal
- Written by: Sharad Devarajan; Sarwat Chaddha (seasons 1–3); Ashwin Pande (seasons 1–3); Arshad Syed (seasons 1–3)
- Directed by: Jeevan J. Kang; Navin John (seasons 1–3)
- Narrated by: Sharad Kelkar
- Country of origin: India
- Original language: Hindi
- No. of seasons: 7
- No. of episodes: 60

Production
- Editor: Tharun Prasad
- Production company: Graphic India

Original release
- Network: Disney+ Hotstar
- Release: 29 January 2021 – present

The Legend of Hanuman is an Indian animated series created by Sharad Devarajan, Jeevan J. Kang and Charuvi Agrawal for Disney+ Hotstar. The series is produced by Graphic India.

The first season premiered on 29 January 2021 with 13 episodes. The series was renewed for a second season with 13 episodes on 27 July 2021. A third season consisting of 6 episodes was released on 12 January 2024. The fourth season was announced on 23 April 2024 on occasion of Hanuman Jayanti. The fourth season aired from 5 June 2024 to 11 July 2024. The fifth season premiered on 25 October 2024. The sixth season aired on 11 April 2025. The seventh season aired on 23 October 2026.

== Synopsis ==
The series follows when God Mahadev incarnates as Hanuman to serve God Rama and his transformation from a mighty warrior to a god and how Hanuman became the beacon of hope amidst the harrowing darkness.

== Voice actors ==
- Sanket Mhatre as Shree Ram
  - Amritesh Pandey as Young Rama
- Surbhi Pandey as Sita
- Damandeep Singh Baggan as Hanuman and Void Demon
  - Jasleen Kaur as Young Hanuman
- Manikant Sarbhoy as Makaradhwaja
- Vikrant Chaturvedi as Sugreev
- Richard Joel as Lakshmana
  - Jihaan as Young Lakshmana
- Sharad Kelkar as Ravana
  - Rohan Jadav as Teenage Ravana
- Aranya Kaur as Mandodari
- Shakti Singh as Jambavana
- Sahil Vaid as Vali (Seasons 1 & 7), Ahiravana (Seasons 3–5) & Shiva (Season 7)
- Toshi Sinha as Shurpanakha
- Rajesh Jolly as Sampati
- Aadityaraj Sharma as Hariya, Sabertooth Shiva Gana
- Pushkar Vijay as Angada
- Rohan Verma as Nala (Brother of Nila)
- Rakhee Sharma as Anjani
- Shailendra Pandey as Vayu
- Surendra Bhatia as Valakhilya & Sage Vishrava
- Samay Raj Thakkar as Sage Vishwamitra
- Vikram Kochhar as Suketu, Murkhava
- Pooja Punjabi as Nirvani
- Soneer Vadhera as Harshashringa
- Nilofer Middey as Kandarpa
- Amit Deondi as Nila (Brother of Nala)
- Shatrughan Sharma as Rakshas Engineer, Sushena & Shatabali
- Manish Bhawan as Varuna Sushena & Kinkara Captain
- Anamaya Verna as Vinata, Rakshas Scout
- Neha Gargava as Swayamprabha
- Ganesh Divekar as Indrajit
- Ajitesh Gupta as Akshayakumara
- Sumanto Roy as Prahasta, Garuda
- Gireesh Sahdev as Vibhishana
- Maansi Singh as Suvarna Matsya
- Ghanshyam Shukla as Vajramushti
- Anup Shukla as Kumbhakarna, Nandi
- Neha Nigam as Shankukarni, Attendant of Mandodari, 2 Rakshasis.
- Sonal Kaushal as Kid
- Uplaksh Kochar as Noble
- Lalit Agarawal as Judge, Rakshas General
- Viraj Maudgil as Child
- Sahil Chaddha as Vaanar Scout
- Anil Datt as Guardian of Dronagiri
- Arpita Vora as 2 Rakshasis.
- Amardeep Jha as Trijata
- Mohak Ninad as Virupaksha, Dhoomraksha
- Siddharth Awasthi as Nikumbha, Manibhadra, Mahodra
- Uday Sabnis as Yamaraj
- Rajeev Raj as Indra (Seasons 1 & 7), Rahu (Season 7), Vaanar Guard (Season 1), Watcher (Season 4), Giant (Season 1), Squinter (Season 4), Guardian (Season 7) Soldier (Season 7), General (Season 7), Jackal-Faced Shiva Gana (Season 7), Vaanar Soldier (Season 7) & many more.
- Prakash Kumar as Goblin Shiva Gana
- Jitendra Singh Rajput as Hairy Scout
- Shiv Kanungo as Subahu, Kalnemi
- Ashish Tyagi as Maricha
- Ajeet Singh Pahlawat as Jalasura

== Production ==
The team use animatics for allowing actors to act instead of just dubbing to the animated work. The character design work is done by the co-creator Charuvi Agrawal.

== Series overview ==
Season	Episodes	Originally released	
Season	Episodes	First released	Last released
1	13	January 29, 2021	
2	13	August 6, 2021	
3	6	January 12, 2024	
4	7	June 5, 2024	July 11, 2024
5	6	October 25, 2024	
6	7	April 11, 2025	

== Episodes ==
=== Season 1 (2021) ===
No.	Title	Original release date
1	"The Legend Begins"	January 29, 2021
2	"The Monkey King"family	January 29, 2021
3	"Kishkinda Bound"	January 29, 2021
4	"The Promise"	January 29, 2021
5	"Spirits of the Forest"	January 29, 2021
6	"Darkness Rises"	January 29, 2021
7	"The Yakshya King"	January 29, 2021
8	"Enter the Void"	January 29, 2021
9	"The Cave"	January 29, 2021
10	"Indra's Curse"	January 29, 2021
11	"Sampati Rises"	January 29, 2021
12	"The Mango and the Sun"	January 29, 2021
13	"Forgotten Truths"	January 29, 2021

=== Season 2 (2021) ===
No.	Title	Original release date
1	"Leap of Faith"	August 6, 2021
2	"Simhika Rises"	August 6, 2021
3	"Ravan"	August 6, 2021
4	"Ashok Vanaa"	August 6, 2021
5	"Sita's Strength"	August 6, 2021
6	"Message Received"	August 6, 2021
7	"Son of the Demon"	August 6, 2021
8	"Prison of Illusions"	August 6, 2021
9	"Immortals"	August 6, 2021
10	"Dance of Fire"	August 6, 2021
11	"Homecoming"	August 6, 2021
12	"Ocean Apart"	August 6, 2021
13	"War Begins"	August 6, 2021

=== Season 3 (2024) ===
No.	Title	Original release date
1	"Lanka"	January 12, 2024
2	"Serpent's Kiss"	January 12, 2024
3	"Ravan Unleashed"	January 12, 2024
4	"Forgotten Son"	January 12, 2024
5	"Terror from the Sky"	January 12, 2024
6	"The Mountain Awakens"	January 12, 2024

=== Season 4 (2024) ===
No.	Title	Original release date
1	"The Lost Memories"	June 5, 2024
Hanuman embarks on a journey of self-discovery as he tries to recall his lost memories and divine powers.
2	"The Awakening"	June 5, 2024
Hanuman awakens his divine potential with the help of his friends and prepares for the challenges ahead.
3	"Wrath of the Giant"	June 13, 2024
The Vaanar army faces its greatest challenge, as Kumbhakaran enters the Battlefield.
4	"The Price of War"	June 20, 2024
In the aftermath of Indrajit's devastating attack, the vaanar army grapples with immense loss as the cost of war is laid bare. Hanuman embarks on a risky quest to save his comrades.
5	"Whispers in the Dark"	June 27, 2024
Hanuman and Lakshman set out on a risky night mission to uncover the secret behind Indrajit's invincibility and put an end to his reign of terror.
6	"A Father's Shadow"	July 4, 2024
Lakshman and Indrajit clash in a battle that will echo through the ages, and Ravan comes to terms with the weight of his son's legacy and the price of his ambition.
7	"Into the Abyss"	July 11, 2024
When Ram and Lakshman are mysteriously transported to Patal Loka, Hanuman navigates treacherous realms to rescue them as Ravan unleashes his fury upon the world.

== Release ==
The series premiered on Disney+ Hotstar globally on January 29, 2021, in seven Indian languages with 5.1 audio.
