= Uday Sabnis =

Indian actor

Uday Sabnis (born 7 June 1959) is an Indian actor. He has worked in English, Hindi and Marathi languages. As a voice actor, most of his work is Indian but he has also dubbed for foreign films and series.

== Filmography ==
=== Live action films ===
Year	Film	Role	Language	Note
1994	Woh Chokri		Hindi	Television film
2002	Hathyar		Hindi	
2002	Annarth		Hindi	
2005	Mumbai Xpress	Traffic Police	Hindi, Tamil	
2005	Sarkar		Hindi	
2006	Shan	Madan Barve	Marathi	
2006	Lage Raho Munna Bhai	G. S. Gaitonde	Hindi	
2008	Checkmate	Inspector Zende	Marathi	
2009	Be Dune Saade Chaar		Marathi	
2009	Jhing Chik Jhing	Shiva	Marathi	
2009	Ek Daav Dhobi Pachhad	Sakha Patil	Marathi	
2010	Bahiru Pehlwan Ki Jai Ho		Marathi	
2010	Ringa Ringa	Chief Minister Appasaheb Marathe	Marathi	
2010	Toonpur Ka Superrhero	Jagaro	Hindi	Voice role in live action film
2011	Dhava Dhav		Marathi	
2011	Masti Express		Hindi	
2011	Arjun	Advocate	Marathi	
2011	Khel Mandala	Dadu	Marathi	
2011	Sharyat	Sita's Father	Marathi	
2012	Jana Gana Mana	Gaidane Saheb	Marathi	
2012	Miss Lovely	Cop at Police Station	Hindi	
2012	Ferrari Ki Sawaari	Inspector	Hindi	
2013	Dhating Dhingana		Marathi	
2013	Duniyadari	Inspector Inamdar	Marathi	
2014	Timepass	Prajakta's Uncle	Marathi	
2014	Poshter Boyz		Marathi	
2014	Rege	Commissioner	Marathi	
2015	Timepass 2	Prajakta's Uncle	Marathi	
2015	Bioscope		Marathi	
2016	Duniya Geli Tel Laavat		Marathi	
2016	Akira	Constable Baapu Rao	Hindi	
2016	Banjo	Vajya's Father	Hindi	
2017	Kachcha Limboo	Prasanna	Marathi	
2024	Dharmaveer 2	Sandipanrao Bhumre	Marathi	
2026	Krantijyoti Vidyalay Marathi Madhyam	patties kaka	Marathi Film	

=== Animated films & Animated series ===
Year	Film/Series title	Role	Language	Notes
2007	Return of Hanuman	Brahma	Hindi	
2012	Krishna Aur Kans	Mushtik	Hindi	
2024	The Legend of Hanuman	Yamaraja	Hindi	Indian animated series created by Sharad Devarajan, Jeevan J. Kang and Charuvi Agrawal for Disney+ Hotstar.

== Dubbing roles ==
=== Animated series ===
Program title	Original voice(s)	Character(s)	Original language	Dub language	Number of episodes	Original airdate	Dubbed airdate	Notes
Dexter's Laboratory	Frank Welker Tom Kenny	The Infraggable Krunk Puppet Pal Clem	English	Hindi	78	4/27/1996-11/20/2003	8/22/1999-2006	
The Powerpuff Girls	Tom Kenny Roger L. Jackson	Narrator Mojo Jojo	English	Hindi	78	11/18/1998- 25 March 2005	1999-2005	Aired on Zee TV in 1999 and on Cartoon Network India from 2000 - 2005.
Batman: The Animated Series	Clive Revill; Efrem Zimbalist Jr.	Alfred Pennyworth	Hindi	English	95	9/5/1992- 9/15/1995	9/9/2000- 7/8/2005	
Superman: The Animated Series	Clancy Brown	Lex Luthor	English	Hindi	54	September 6, 1996 - February 12, 2000		Aired on Cartoon Network India.
Justice League	Phil LaMarr	John Stewart/Green Lantern	English	Hindi	52	11/17/2001- 5/29/2004	9/9/2002- 7/8/2006	Aired on Cartoon Network India.
Justice League Unlimited	Phil LaMarr Carl Lumbly	John Stewart/Green Lantern J'onn J'onzz / Martian Manhunter	English	Hindi	39 13	07/31/2004- 5/13/2006		Voiced Martian Manhunter in Season 3, replacing Chetanya Adib.
The Avengers: Earth's Mightiest Heroes	Clancy Brown	Odin	English	Hindi	52	9/22/2010– 11/11/2012		3 episodes
Avengers Assemble	Frank Welker	Odin	English	Hindi	127	5/26/2013– 2/24/2019		2 episodes
Hulk and the Agents of S.M.A.S.H.	Frank Welker	Odin	English	Hindi	52	8/11/2013– 6/28/2015		2 episodes

=== Live action films ===
==== Hollywood films ====
Film title	Actor	Character	Original language	Dub language	Original Year Release	Dub Year Release	Notes
Harry Potter and the Philosopher's Stone	Richard Griffiths †	Vernon Dursley	English	Hindi	2001	2002	Release in the U.S., India and Pakistan as: Harry Potter and the Sorcerer's Stone.
Harry Potter and the Chamber of Secrets	Richard Griffiths †	Vernon Dursley	English	Hindi	2002	2003	
Harry Potter and the Prisoner of Azkaban	Richard Griffiths †	Vernon Dursley	English	Hindi	2004	2004	
Harry Potter and the Order of the Phoenix	Richard Griffiths †	Vernon Dursley	English	Hindi	2007	2007	
Harry Potter and the Deathly Hallows – Part 1	Richard Griffiths †	Vernon Dursley	English	Hindi	2010	2010	
Batman Begins	Morgan Freeman	Lucius Fox	English	Hindi	2005	2005	
The Dark Knight	Morgan Freeman	Lucius Fox	English	Hindi	2008	2008	
The Dark Knight Rises	Morgan Freeman	Lucius Fox	English	Hindi	2012	2012	
Mission: Impossible III	Ving Rhames	Luther Stickell	English	Hindi	2006	2006	Rajesh Jolly dubbed this character in the previous two films.
Mission: Impossible – Ghost Protocol	Ving Rhames	Luther Stickell (uncredited cameo)	English	Hindi	2011	2011	
Mission: Impossible – Rogue Nation	Ving Rhames	Luther Stickell	English	Hindi	2015	2015	
Mission: Impossible – Fallout	Ving Rhames	Luther Stickell	English	Hindi	2018	2018	
Hellboy	Ron Perlman	Hellboy	English	Hindi	2004	2011	
Batman Returns	Danny DeVito	Oswald Cobblepot / Penguin	English	Hindi	1992		
Iron Man 3	Ben Kingsley	Trevor Slattery	English	Hindi	2013	2013	
X-Men	Tyler Mane	Victor; Creed / Sabretooth	English	Hindi	2000	2000	
Troy	Brendan Gleeson	Menelaus	English	Hindi	2004	2004	
The Matrix Reloaded	Harry Lennix	Commander Lock	English	Hindi	2003	2003	
The Matrix Revolutions	Harry Lennix	Commander Lock	English	Hindi	2003	2003	
Passengers	Laurence Fishburne	Chief Gus Mancuso	English	Hindi	2016	2016	
Thor: Ragnarok	Clancy Brown	Surtur (voice)	English	Hindi	2017	2017	
Thor: Love and Thunder	Russell Crowe	Zeus	English	Hindi	2022	2022	
Transformers: Rise of the Beasts	Ron Perlman	Optimus Primal	English	Hindi	2023	2023	
Days of Thunder	Robert Duvall	Harry Hogge	English	Hindi	1990		Was dubbed into Hindi for a later release.

==== Indian films ====
All released without their Hindi dubbed soundtrack albums except Robot.

Film title	Actor	Character	Original language	Dub language	Original Year Release	Dub Year Release	Notes
Enthiran	Delhi Kumar	Vaseegaran's father	Tamil	Hindi	2010	2010	The Hindi dub was titled: "Robot".
Khatarnak	Lal	Smuggler	Telugu	Hindi	2006	2012	The Hindi dub was titled: "Main Hoon Khatarnak".
Chirutha	Ashish Vidyarthi	Mattu Bhai	Telugu	Hindi	2007	2013	
Mogudu	Ahuti Prasad †	Unknown	Telugu	Hindi	2011	2013	The Hindi dub was titled: "Mard Ki Zaban".
Saleem	Mohan Babu	Ogirala Jogaiah "Ozo"	Telugu	Hindi	2009	2013	The Hindi dub was titled: "The Fighterman Saleem".
Kotha Bangaru Lokam	Ahuti Prasad †	Swapna's father	Telugu	Hindi	2008	2013	The Hindi dub was titled: "Pavitra Bandhan".
Daruvu	Prabhu	Yama Jr.	Telugu	Hindi	2012	2013	The Hindi dub was titled: "Jeene Nahi Doonga".
Rebel	Pradeep Rawat	Simhadri (Siraj in Hindi version)	Telugu	Hindi	2012	2014	The Hindi dub was titled: "The Return Of Rebel".
Iddarammayilatho	Rao Ramesh	Akanksha's father	Telugu	Hindi	2013	2014	The Hindi dub was titled: "Dangerous Khiladi 2".
Mirchi	Sampath Raj	Uma	Telugu	Hindi	2013	2015	The Hindi dub was titled: "Khatarnak Khiladi".
Seethamma Vakitlo Sirimalle Chettu	Rao Ramesh	Geetha's father	Telugu	Hindi	2013	2015	The Hindi dub was titled: "Sabse Badhkar Hum 2".
Power	Sampath Raj	Ganguly Bhai	Telugu	Hindi	2014	2015	The Hindi dub was titled: "Power Unlimited".
Loukyam	Sampath Raj	Babji	Telugu	Hindi	2014	2015	The Hindi dub was titled: "Ek Khiladi".
Govindudu Andarivadele	Rao Ramesh	Rajendra	Telugu	Hindi	2014	2016	The Hindi dub was titled: "Yevadu 2".
Nenu Sailaja	Pradeep Rawat	Maharshi	Telugu	Hindi	2016	2016	The Hindi dub was titled: "The Super Khiladi 3".
Son of Satyamurthy	Rao Ramesh	Pallavi's father	Telugu	Hindi	2015	2016	
Maari	Shanmugarajan	Velu Anna (Velu Bhai in Hindi version)	Tamil	Hindi	2015	2016	The Hindi dub was titled: "Rowdy Hero".
Jaggu Dada	Sharath Lohitashwa	Veeru Dada	Kannada	Hindi	2016	2017	The Hindi dub was titled: "Khatanak Khiladi 3".
Katamarayudu	Rao Ramesh	Narsappa	Telugu	Hindi	2017	2017	
Sarrainodu	Pradeep Rawat	Obul Reddy	Telugu	Hindi	2016	2017	
Janatha Garage	Ashish Vidyarthi (voice in original version dubbed by P. Ravi Shankar)	Raghava's business partner	Telugu	Hindi	2016	2017	The Hindi dub was titled: "Janta Garage".
Hyper	Rao Ramesh	Minister Rajappa	Telugu	Hindi	2016	2017	The Hindi dub was titled: "Son Of Satyamurthy 2".
Soukhyam	Pradeep Rawat	Bavuji	Telugu	Hindi	2015	2017	The Hindi dub was titled: "Mard Ki Zaban 2".
Speedunnodu	Rao Ramesh	Ramachandrappa (Prakash Singh in Hindi version)	Telugu	Hindi	2016	2017	
Bairavaa	Sharath Lohitashwa	Union Minister	Tamil	Hindi	2017	2017	The Hindi dub was titled: "Bhairava".
Duvvada Jagannadham	Rao Ramesh	Royyala Naidu (Royal Naidu in Hindi version)	Telugu	Hindi	2017	2017	The Hindi dub was titled: "DJ".
Kodi	Anil Murali †	Crime branch Inspector V. Ravichandran	Tamil	Hindi	2016	2017	The Hindi dub was titled: "Rowdy Hero 2".
Gopala Gopala	Ashish Vidyarthi	Shankar Narayana	Telugu	Hindi	2015	2018	
Agnyaathavaasi	Rao Ramesh	Varma (Ana in Hindi Version)	Telugu	Hindi	2018	2018	The Hindi dub was titled: "Yevadu 3".
Bejawada	Ahuti Prasad	Adi Vishnu	Telugu	Hindi	2011	2013	The Hindi dub was titled:"Hero the action man''.
Jersey	Sampath Raj	Coach Ramappa Gowda (Ramanandhan Hegde in Hindi version)	Telugu	Hindi	2019	2019	
Rowdy	Mohan Babu	Anna	Telugu	Hindi	2014	2019	
Kanthaswamy	Ashish Vidyarthi (voice in original version dubbed by P. Ravi Shankar)	Pallur Paramajothi Ponnusamy (PP Ponnusamy) (Param Pujya Ponnuswamy in Hindi version)	Tamil	Hindi	2009	2019	The Hindi dub was titled: "Temper 2".
Run Raja Run	Sampath Raj	Dileep Kumar	Telugu	Hindi	2014	2020	
Desamuduru	Pradeep Rawat	Tambi Durai (Tangabali in Hindi version)	Telugu	Hindi	2007	2020	The Hindi dub was titled: "Ek Jwalamukhi".
Asuran	Pasupathy	Murugesan	Tamil	Hindi	2019	2021	
Dhill	Ashish Vidyarthi	Inspector Shankar, later DSP / aka Encounter Shankar	Tamil	Hindi	2001	2021	The Hindi dub was titled: "Meri Aan: Man In Work".
Pushpa: The Rise	Sunil	Mangalam Srinu	Telugu	Hindi	2021	2021	

|Pushpa 2 The Rule |Sunil |Telugu |Hindi |2024 |2024

=== Animated films ===
Film title	Original Voice(s)	Character role(s)	Original language	Dub Language	Original Year Release	Dub year Release	Notes
Barbie as the Princess and the Pauper	Garry Chalk	Herve	English	Hindi	2004	2005	Rajshree Nath's last role as Barbie, Songs were not dubbed, only dialogue.
Open Season	Martin Lawrence	Boog	English	Hindi	2006	2006	
Open Season 2	Mike Epps	Boog	English	Hindi	2008	2008	
Open Season 3	Matthew J. Munn	Boog	English	Hindi	2010	2010	
Brave	Billy Connolly	King Fergus	English	Marathi	2012	2015	Dubbed to air on Zee Marathi.
How to Train Your Dragon	Craig Ferguson	Gobber the Belch	English	Hindi	2010	2010	
How to Train Your Dragon 2	Craig Ferguson	Gobber the Belch	English	Hindi	2014	2014	
How to Train Your Dragon: The Hidden World	Craig Ferguson	Gobber the Belch	English	Hindi	2019	2019	
Batman Beyond: Return of the Joker	Henry Rollins Dean Stockwell	Benjamin Knox / Bonk Tim Drake	English	Hindi	2000		Aired on Cartoon Network India.
Kung Fu Panda 3	J. K. Simmons	Kai	English	Hindi	2016	2016	
The Angry Birds Movie	Bill Hader	Leonard / King Mudbeard	English	Hindi	2016	2016	
The Angry Birds Movie 2	Bill Hader	Leonard / King Mudbeard	English	Hindi	2019	2019	
Batman: Mask of the Phantasm	Efrem Zimbalist Jr.	Alfred Pennyworth	English	Hindi	1993	2000	Aired on Cartoon Network India.
The Adventures of Tintin	Joe Starr	Barnaby Dawes	English	Hindi	2011	2011	

== See also ==
- Dubbing
- List of Indian dubbing artists
