= Shri Hanuman Chalisa =

- Film poster
- Directed by: Charuvi Agrawal
- Produced by: Charuvi Design Labs Pvt. Ltd.
- Starring: Amitabh Bachchan; Sonu Nigam; Aadesh Shrivastava; Kumar Sanu; Udit Narayan
- Music by: Veecon Music & Entertainment Pvt. Ltd.
- Production company: Charuvi Design Labs
- Release date: June 2013 (Palm Springs)
- Running time: 12 minutes 20 seconds
- Country: India
- Language: Hindi

Shri Hanuman Chalisa is a 2013 Indian computer-animated short film rendition of Hanuman Chalisa produced by Charuvi Design Labs and directed by Charuvi Agrawal. It is based on the poem Hanuman Chalisa attributed to Tulsidas. It won the Best Animation Film award the Jaipur Film Fest.

The film is a visual depiction of the lyrics of Hanuman Chalisa, a devotional Hindu song which praises the selflessness, strength and devotion of the Hindu god Hanuman as depicted in the epic Ramayana in which he was instrumental in freeing Sita from the clutches of the demon king Ravana.

The film premiered at the 2013 Palm Springs International Film Festival under the title Forty Hymns of Faith.

== Plot ==
The 12-minute short film Shri Hanuman Chalisa illustrates the 40 verses of the hymn. It contains narration and stylised images in 3D digital format, interpreting the Chalisa in a new medium while retaining the original story. The film includes a musical soundtrack.

== Screenings ==
Shri Hanuman Chalisa was screened at various festivals around the world, including the SIGGRAPH Computer Animation Festival in 2011. and the Palm Springs International ShortFest, the Edinburgh International Film Festival, the Anima Mundi, the Toronto Animation Arts Festival International, the Dimension-3 Film Festival, and the Rhode Island International Film Festival in 2013. It was also show at the Jaipur International Film Festival in 2014.

== Awards ==
- ANIMA+ AWARD 2015, Brazil.
- Jaipur International Film Festival, 2014 – Best Animation award
- FICCI BAF, 2014
