= Toshi Sinha =

Indian voice actress

- Occupations: Voice actress; radio jockey; radio programmer
- Years active: 2001–Current

Toshi Sinha (Hindi: Tōśī Sinhā), is an Indian voice actress who specializes for dubbing foreign productions as a self-employed freelance dubbing artist.

== Dubbing career ==
She has dubbed for South Indian film and Hollywood actresses. Her foreign content that would go on Discovery Channel, Disney Channel, Cartoon Network, Pogo, Nickelodeon and UTV.

She is the Hindi voice of Robin Wright as Claire Underwood in House of Cards.

== Dubbing roles ==
=== Live action television series ===
Title	Actor/Actress	Role	Dub language	Original language	Episodes	Original airdate	Dubbed airdate	Notes
Lizzie McGuire	Hilary Duff	Elizabeth Brooke "Lizzie" McGuire	Hindi	English	64	1/21/2001- 14 February 2004	3/7/2003-2007	
That's So Raven	Raven-Symoné	Raven Lydia Baxter	Hindi	English	100	1/17/2003-11/10/2007	12/17/2004-2008	
That's So Suite Life of Hannah Montana	Raven-Symoné	Raven Lydia Baxter	Hindi	English	1	28 June 2006	Unknown	
Cory in the House	Raven-Symoné	Raven Lydia Baxter	Hindi	English	34 (Dubbed 1)	1/12/2007-9/13/2008	6/7/2007-2008	
Man, Woman, Wild	Ruth England	Herself	Hindi	English	22	7/16/2010- 19 January 2012	Unknown	Reality TV series.
Drake & Josh	Various Actresses	Various Characters	Hindi	English	56	11 January 2004 - 16 September 2007		
Lucifer	Aimee Garcia	Ella Lopez	Hindi	English		25/1/2016– present		Aired on Netflix
Spider-Noir	Karen Rodriguez	Janet Ruiz	Hindi	English	8	28/5/2026	28/5/2026	Streaming on Prime Video.

=== Animated series ===
Program title	Original voice	Character	Dub language	Original language	Number of episodes	Original airdate	Dubbed airdate	Notes
Spider-Man	Jennifer Hale	Felicia Hardy / Black Cat (Second Dub)	Hindi	English	65	11/19/1994-1/31/1998		Aired on Disney XD.

==== Indian animated series ====
Title	Character	Language	Airdate	Notes
The Legend of Hanuman	Shurpanakha	Hindi	2021	Airing on Disney Plus Hotstar

=== Live action films ===
==== Indian films ====
Film title	Actress	Character	Dub language	Original language	Original year release	Dub year release	Notes
Yamadonga	Priyamani	Maheshwari aka Mahi	Hindi	Telugu	2007	2008	The Hindi dub was titled: Lok Parlok.
Nagavalli	Anushka Shetty	Chandramukhi / Nagavalli	Hindi	Telugu	2010	2011	The Hindi dub was titled: Mera Badla: Revenge.
Athadu	Trisha Krishnan	Poori (Pooja in Hindi version)	Hindi	Telugu	2005	2013	The Hindi dub was titled: Cheetah: The Power Of One.
Dhammu	Trisha Krishnan	Sathya	Hindi	Telugu	2012	2013	
Raam	Priyamani	Pooja	Hindi	Kannada	2009	2013	The Hindi dub was titled: Aaj Ka Naya Ready.
Businessman	Ayesha Shiva	Ayesha	Hindi	Telugu	2012	2013	The Hindi dub was titled: No. 1 Businessman.
Vettaikaaran	Anushka Shetty	Susheela	Hindi	Tamil	2009	2014	The Hindi dub was titled: Dangerous Khiladi 3.
Muni 2: Kanchana	Raai Laxmi	Priya	Hindi	Tamil	2011	2014	
Mirchi	Anushka Shetty	Vennela (Veena in Hindi version)	Hindi	Telugu	2013	2015	The Hindi dub was titled: Khatarnak Khiladi.
Chandee	Priyamani	Ganga a.k.a. Chandee	Hindi	Telugu	2013	2015	The Hindi dub was titled: Chandi: The Power Of Woman.
Denikaina Ready	Hansika Motwani	Sharmila	Hindi	Telugu	2012	2015	The Hindi dub was titled: Sabse Badi Hera Pheri 2.
Thirumalai	Jyothika	Swetha	Hindi	Tamil	2003	2015	The Hindi dub was titled: Dum 2.
Mappillai	Hansika Motwani	Gayathri	Hindi	Tamil	2011	2015	The Hindi dub was titled: Jamai Raja.
Saamy	Trisha Krishnan	Bhuvana (Bhavna in Hindi version)	Hindi	Tamil	2003	2015	The Hindi dub was titled: Policewala Gunda 3.
Son of Satyamurthy	Nithya Menen	Valli (Vani in Hindi version)	Hindi	Telugu	2015	2016	
Yennai Arindhaal	Anushka Shetty	Thenmozhi (Suhasini in Hindi version)	Hindi	Tamil	2015	2016	The Hindi dub was titled: Satyadev: The Fearless Cop.
Aambala	Hansika Motwani	Maya	Hindi	Tamil	2015	2016	
Biriyani	Hansika Motwani	Priyanka	Hindi	Tamil	2013	2016	The Hindi dub was titled: Dum Biryani.
Sarrainodu	Vidyullekha Raman	Tamizh Selvi	Hindi	Telugu	2016	2017	
Kodi	Trisha Krishnan	Rudhra	Hindi	Tamil	2016	2017	The Hindi dub was titled: Rowdy Hero 2.
Janatha Garage	Nithya Menen	Anu	Hindi	Telugu	2016	2017	The Hindi dub was titled: Janta Garage.
Aayirathil Oruvan	Reemma Sen	Anitha Pandiyan	Hindi	Tamil	2010	2017	The Hindi dub was titled: Kaashmora 2.
Terror	Nikita Thukral	Vijay's wife	Hindi	Telugu	2016	2017	
Gulaebaghavali	Hansika Motwani	Viji	Hindi	Tamil	2018	2018	
Gopala Gopala	Shriya Saran	Meenakshi	Hindi	Telugu	2015	2018	
Chanti	Revathy	Jyothi, Chanti's sister	Hindi	Telugu	2004	2018	The Hindi dub was titled: Main Insaaf Karoonga 2.
Bhaagamathie	Anushka Shetty	Chanchala	Hindi	Telugu	2018	2018	
Anando Brahma	Taapsee Pannu	Ghost	Hindi	Telugu	2017	2018	The Hindi dub was titled: Kanchana 3.
Paisa Vasool	Shriya Saran	Sarika	Hindi	Telugu	2017	2018	
Sketch	Tamannaah Bhatia	Amuthavalli (Ammu) (Amisha in Hindi version)	Hindi	Tamil	2018	2018	
U Turn	Bhumika Chawla	Maya	Hindi	Telugu	2018	2019	
Romeo Juliet	Hansika Motwani	Aishwarya (Subbulakshmi)	Hindi	Tamil	2015	2019	
Kanthaswamy	Shriya Saran	PP Subbulakshmi	Hindi	Tamil	2009	2019	The Hindi dub was titled: Temper 2.
Amar Akbar Anthony	Ileana D'Cruz	Aishwarya / Pooja / Teresa	Hindi	Telugu	2018	2019	The Hindi dub was titled: Amar Akbhar Anthoni.
Avunu Valliddaru Ista Paddaru!	Kaveri	Swathi	Hindi	Telugu	2002	2020	The Hindi dub was titled: Main Tera Tu Meri.
Naachiyaar	Jyothika	P. Naachiyaar Kumari IPS	Hindi	Tamil	2018	2020	The Hindi dub was titled: Tejasvini 2.
Kadhal Azhivathillai	Charmy Kaur	Charmi	Hindi	Tamil	2002	2020	The Hindi dub was titled: Daringbaaz Aashiq 3.
Thamizhan	Priyanka Chopra	Priya (Second Dub)	Hindi	Tamil	2002	2021	The Hindi dub was titled: Jeet - Born To Win.

==== Hollywood films ====
Film title	Actor/Actress	Character	Dub language	Original language	Original year release	Dub year release	Notes
The Tuxedo	Jennifer Love Hewitt	Del Blaine	Hindi	English; Cantonese Chinese	2002	2002	
The Lizzie McGuire Movie	Hilary Duff	Lizzie McGuire	Hindi	English	2003	Unknown	
The Chronicles of Narnia: The Lion, The Witch and the Wardrobe	Anna Popplewell	Susan Pevensie	Hindi	English	2005	2005	
The Chronicles of Narnia: Prince Caspian	Anna Popplewell	Susan Pevensie	Hindi	English	2008	2008	Toshi's name was mentioned on the Hindi dub credits of the DVD release of the film.
The Chronicles of Narnia: The Voyage of the Dawn Treader	Anna Popplewell	Susan Pevensie (cameo)	Hindi	English	2010	2010	Toshi's name was mentioned on the Hindi dub credits of the DVD release of the film, also containing the Tamil and Telugu credits.
Knight and Day	Cameron Diaz	June Havens	Hindi	English	2010	2010	
The Amazing Spider-Man	Emma Stone	Gwen Stacy	Hindi	English	2012	2012	
The Amazing Spider-Man 2	Emma Stone	Gwen Stacy	Hindi	English	2014	2014	
Skyfall	Naomie Harris	Eve Moneypenny	Hindi	English	2012	2012	Toshi's name was mentioned on the Hindi dub credits of the DVD release of the film, also containing the Tamil, Telugu, Russian and Ukrainian credits.
Spectre	Naomie Harris	Eve Moneypenny	Hindi	English	2015	2015	
Thor	Natalie Portman	Jane Foster	Hindi	English	2011	2011	
Thor: The Dark World	Natalie Portman	Jane Foster	Hindi	English	2013	2013	
Avengers: Endgame	Natalie Portman	Jane Foster (cameo)	Hindi	English	2019	2019	
Fantastic Four	Jessica Alba	Susan Storm	Hindi	English	2005	2005	
Divergent	Maggie Q	Tori Wu	Hindi	English	2014	2014	
Vanilla Sky	Penélope Cruz	Sofia Serrano	Hindi	English	2001	2015	
Ghost Rider	Eva Mendes	Roxanne Simpson	Hindi	English	2007	2013	
Riddick	Katee Sackhoff	Dahl	Hindi	English	2013	2013	
Jurassic World	Bryce Dallas Howard	Claire Dearing	Hindi	English	2015	2015	
Jurassic World: Fallen Kingdom	Bryce Dallas Howard	Claire Dearing	Hindi	English	2018	2018	
Deadpool	Morena Baccarin	Vanessa	Hindi	English	2016	2016	
Deadpool 2	Morena Baccarin	Vanessa	Hindi	English	2018	2018	
Furious 7	Nathalie Emmanuel	Ramsey	Hindi	English	2015	2015	
The Fate of the Furious	Nathalie Emmanuel	Ramsey	Hindi	English	2017	2017	
Inferno	Felicity Jones	Dr. Sienna Brooks	Hindi	English	2016	2016	
Sky High	Mary Elizabeth Winstead	Gwendolyn "Gwen" Grayson / Royal Pain / Sue Tenny	Hindi	English	2005	2005	
The Mummy	Sofia Boutella	Princess Ahmanet / The Mummy	Hindi	English	2017	2017	
Elektra	Jennifer Garner	Elektra Natchios	Hindi	English	2005	2005	
G.I. Joe: Retaliation	Adrianne Palicki	Jaye Burnett / Lady Jaye	Hindi	English	2013	2013	
The Greatest Showman	Keala Settle	Lettie Lutz	Hindi	English	2017	2018	
The Curious Case of Benjamin Button	Taraji P. Henson	Queenie	Hindi	English	2008	2008	

=== Animated films ===
Film title	Original voice	Character	Dub language	Original language	Original Release	Dub Release	Notes
Barbie as Rapunzel	Jocelyn Loewen	Princess Lorena	Hindi	English	2002	2004	Her name was mentioned in the Hindi dubbing credits that were shown after the original ending credits.
Barbie as the Island Princess	Candice Nicole Chantal Strand Patricia Drake	Princess Luciana Sofia Queen Danielle Mama Pig	Hindi	English	2007	2007	Toshi Sinha's name has been mentioned on the Hindi dubbing credits, after the end of the original end credits and she has voiced for 4 characters in the Hindi dubbed version. For Princess Luciana, only the Hindi dialogue was dubbed. The Hindi singing voice was provided by Supriya Joshi.
The Incredibles	Unknown	Unknown	Hindi	English	2004	2004	The Hindi dub released as "Hum Hain Lajawab".
Kung Fu Panda	Lucy Liu	Viper	Hindi	English	2008	2008	
Kung Fu Panda 2	Lucy Liu	Viper	Hindi	English	2011	2011	
Kung Fu Panda 3	Lucy Liu	Viper	Hindi	English	2016	2016	
Finding Dory	Ellen DeGeneres	Dory	Hindi	English	2016	2016	
Trolls	Zooey Deschanel	Bridget	Hindi	English	2016	2017	Hindi dub produced and released only for Home video
Zootopia	Jenny Slate	Assistant Mayor Dawn Bellwether	Hindi	English	2016	2017	Hindi dub premiered in Movies OK on 17 September 2017
Over the Moon	Phillipa Soo	Chang'e	Hindi	English	2020	2020	Hindi dub premiered in Netflix on 23 October 2020

== See also ==
- List of Indian dubbing artists
