= Nila (Ramayana) =

Ramayana character

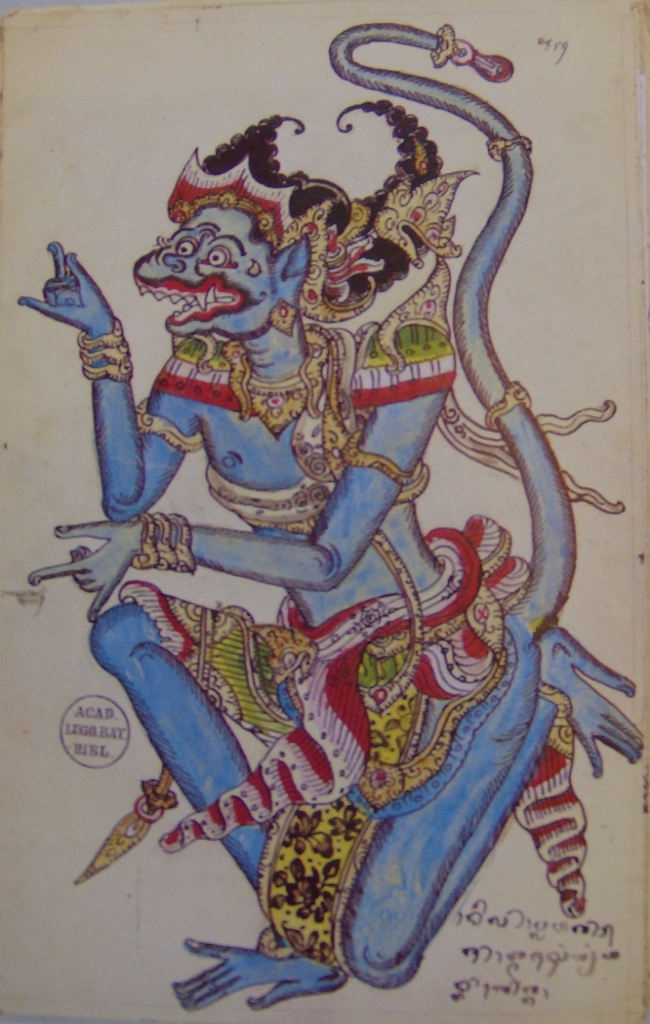
- A Balinese painting of Nila

Information
- Race: Vanara
- Family: Agni (father); Nala (brother)

Nila (Sanskrit: नील, romanized: Nīla), also spelled as Neela, is a character in the Hindu epic Ramayana. He is a vanara chieftain in the army of Rama, the prince of Ayodhya and avatar of the god Vishnu. He is the commander-in-chief of the vanara army under the vanara king Sugriva, and is described as leading the army in Rama's battle against the rakshasa king Ravana of Lanka (identified with modern-day Sri Lanka) and as killing many rakshasas.

== Legend ==
In the Ramayana, Nila is described as the son of Agni, the god of fire, and as the "Kapishreshtha (foremost among the vanaras) in effulgence, reputation, and prowess". An important part of the epic describes the role played by the vanara army in the rescue of Sita, the wife of Rama who is kidnapped by Ravana, the rakshasa king of Lanka. The many stories forming the epic are retold in various adaptations.

=== Search for Sita ===
The Ramayana describes Nila as the commander-in-chief of the vanara army, under the king Sugriva. Sugriva orders Nila to assemble the vanaras so that they can be sent to locate Sita. The epic specifics Nila as a member of the search-party that headed in the southern direction. The Mahabharata epic also tells of Nila being sent with other vanaras in the search for Sita.

Nila is mentioned as one of four vanaras powerful enough to cross the ocean between India and Lanka. In the narrative, Hanuman, Rama's devotee and vanara general, is chosen to fly to Lanka and search for Sita, which he succeeds in accomplishing. Nila is ordered by Sugriva to find a route to Lanka, through which plenty of food is available. Sugriva and Nila also issue directives to the army to march.

=== Builder of the bridge ===
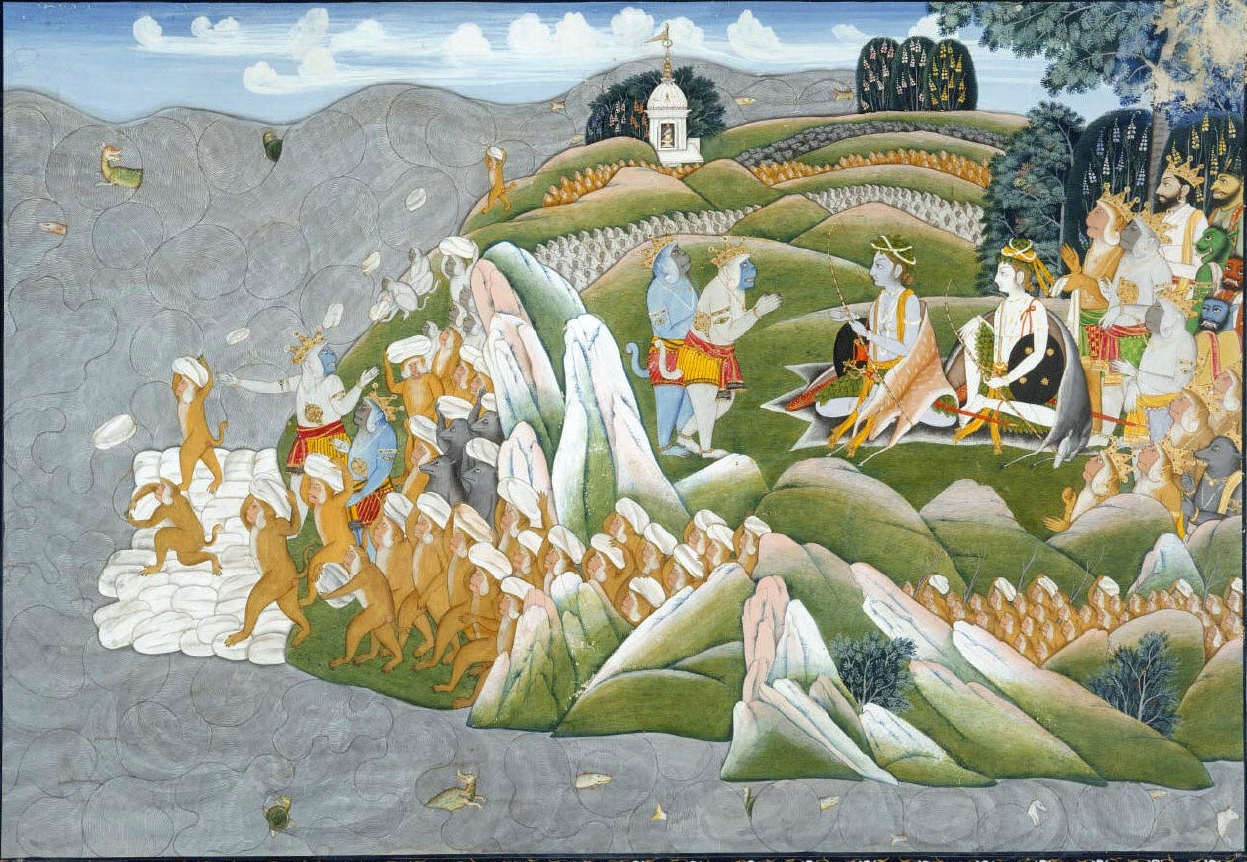
Nala (white vanara) and Nila (blue vanara) talking with Rama. Left: Nala and Nila directing the vanaras to place the stones in the ocean.

Rama, aided by an army of vanaras, reaches the end of land, but needs to cross over to Lanka to retrieve Sita. The Ramayana credits Nala as the sole builder of the Rama Setu, a bridge across the ocean between Rameswaram and Lanka, enabling the forces of Rama to pass over to Lanka. However, the Ramacharitamanasa credits Nala and his brother Nila for the bridge's creation. The sea-god Varuna tells Rama that both of them possess the ability to make stones float on water.

The tale elaborates on how the two vanaras came to have this power: In their youth these vanaras, being very mischievous, often play by throwing the murtis (holy images) worshipped by the sages in the water. To prevent the sacred images from drowning, the sages decree that any stone tossed by them in water will never submerge. Another tale narrates how as assured by Varuna, the stones dropped by Nala and Nila would forever float, but with the condition that they would drift in the sea without forming a contiguous structure. The version has Hanuman suggest that the name of Rama be written across the stones so that they stick together, and describes the strategy as overcoming the proviso.

=== Battle of Lanka ===
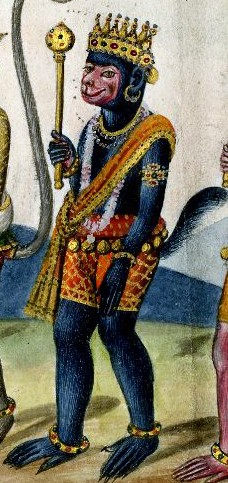
Nila, Company style

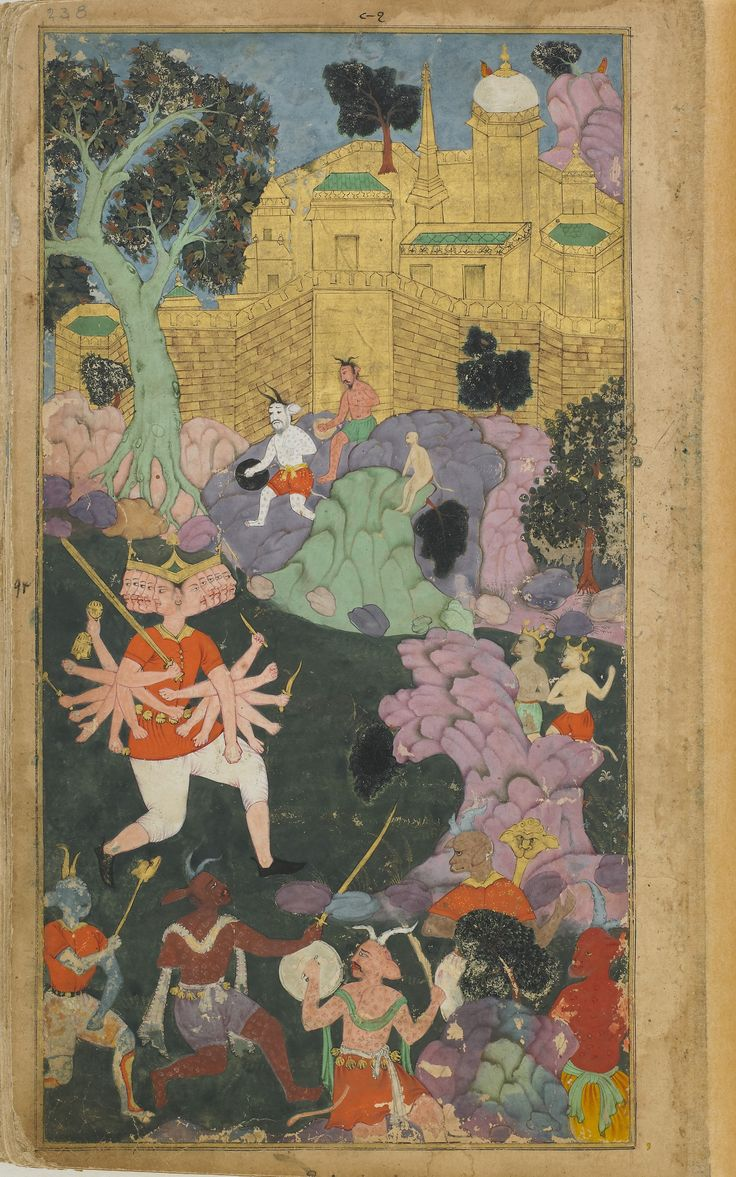
Ravana and his forces take up position before the city

Nila heads the vanara army in the battle led by Rama against Ravana and his rakshasa army. The Ramayana tells of Nila facing the rakshasa Nikumbha. Though injured by the rakshasa, Nila picks up the chariot wheel of Nikumbha and kills him with it. Nila also fights a fierce battle with Prahasta. The rakshasa shoots many arrows at Nila who, unable to escape, bears them calmly with closed eyes. Later, when Prahasta dashes towards Nila with a mallet, the vanara fights back with rocks and finally hurls a huge boulder at him, thus slaying him. Nila also battles with Ravana, jumping onto his chariot. Nila and Hanuman together battle with the rakshasas Trishira and Mahodara, when Nila kills Mahodara with a rock. The Mahabharata states that he slays the rakshasa Pramathi in the battle. The Kamba Ramayana portrays him as being defeated and struck unconscious by Meghanada, Ravana's son.

The Krittivasi Ramayan narrates how the vanaras are sent to disturb the yajna (fire sacrifice) that Ravana is performing in order to make himself invincible. Nila is described as polluting the ritual by climbing on Ravana's heads and urinating on them.

== Jainism ==
According to Jain texts, Nila took Jain Diksha and attained Moksha from Mangi-Tungi.
