= Bhanumati (Yadava princess) =

Character in Hindu mythology

- Harivamsha character
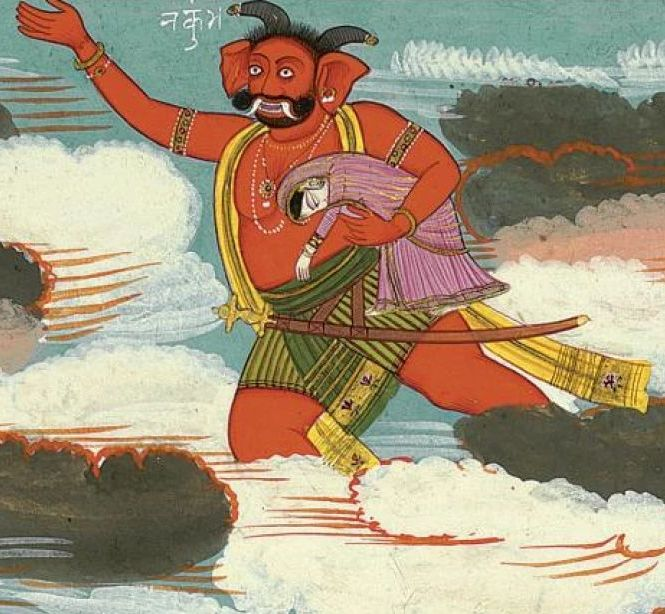
- Nikumbha kidnaps Princess Bhanumati, Pahari miniature, c. 19th century
- Family: Bhanu (father)
- Spouse: Sahadeva
- Origin: Dvaraka

Bhanumati (Sanskrit: भानुमती, IAST: Bhānumatī) is a figure mentioned in the Harivamsha, a significant text in the corpus of Hindu literature and an appendix to the Mahabharata. She is described as the daughter of Bhanu, a prominent leader of the Yadava dynasty. In the narrative, Bhanumati is abducted by a demon, Nikumbha due to a curse. She gets rescued, after which she marries Sahadeva, one of the Pandava princes.

== Textual background ==
Even though Sahadeva plays a major role in the Mahabharata, Bhanumati doesn't find any mention in it. In the Mahabharata, Sahadeva is depicted with only two wives—Draupadi and Vijaya. Bhanumati ’s story in the Harivamsha is part of the text’s broader focus on the Yadava dynasty, narrated in Chapter 91 of Vishnu Parva of the text. In the Harivamsha, Bhanumati is introduced as a relative of Krishna.

The Harivamsha is a supplementary text to the Mahabharata that expands on Krishna’s life, ancestry, and divine deeds. Composed in Sanskrit, this text provides an expansive narrative of Krishna's life and lineage, along with the cosmic and dynastic framework that surrounds him. It is divided into three major sections—Harivamsha Parva, Vishnu Parva, and Bhavishya Parva—and contains over 16,000 verses. While it is traditionally associated with the Mahabharata, it functions as an independent Purana in many respects, given its thematic and narrative scope. The Critical Edition of the Harivamsha only contains 5965 verses.

== Legend ==
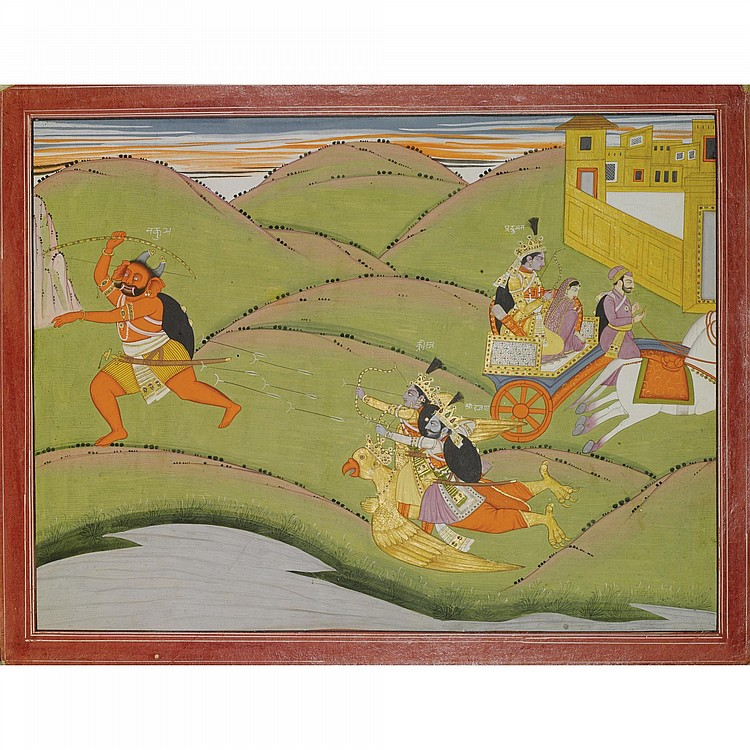
Pradyumna escorts a rescued Bhanumati, while Krishna and Arjuna chase Nikumbha, Pahari miniature

During a festive gathering at the palace of Pindaraka, where the Yadavas were engaged in celebrations, a Danava (demon) named Nikumbha seized the opportunity to abduct Bhanumati. This act of abduction was motivated by past animosity, as Pradyumna, Krishna’s son, had previously killed Nikumbha’s brother, Vajranabha. Taking advantage of the unguarded state of Bhanumati ’s garden, Nikumbha carried her away.

This incident, however, was linked to an earlier curse. Bhanumati had once displeased the sage Durvasas in the garden of Raivata, which led to the sage cursing her to fall into the hands of an enemy. The curse was later tempered through the intercession of Narada and other sages, who persuaded Durvasas to mitigate its effects. Consequently, the sage assured that although Bhanumati would be abducted, she would remain a virgin and unharmed and later marry a virtuous and noble husband.

Following her abduction, Krishna, accompanied by Arjuna and Pradyumna, pursued Nikumbha. A fierce battle ensued, during which the three heroes sought to rescue Bhanumati without harming her. Despite the demon’s use of powerful illusions and formidable combat abilities, he was ultimately defeated when Krishna used his Sudarshana Chakra to sever his head.

After her rescue, Bhanumati was taken to Dvaraka. There, Narada reminded her father, Bhanu, of the prophecy tied to the curse and advised him to give his daughter’s hand in marriage to Sahadeva, the youngest of the Pandava brothers. Bhanu followed this counsel, and Bhanumati was married to Sahadeva in a ceremony attended by Krishna and other prominent figures.

== Adaptations ==
The narrative of Bhanumati’s marriage to Sahadeva has been adapted by 17th century poet Reduri Rangaraju in his poem, Bhanumati-parinayamu.
