= Durvasa =

Sage in Hinduism

Rishi Durvasa
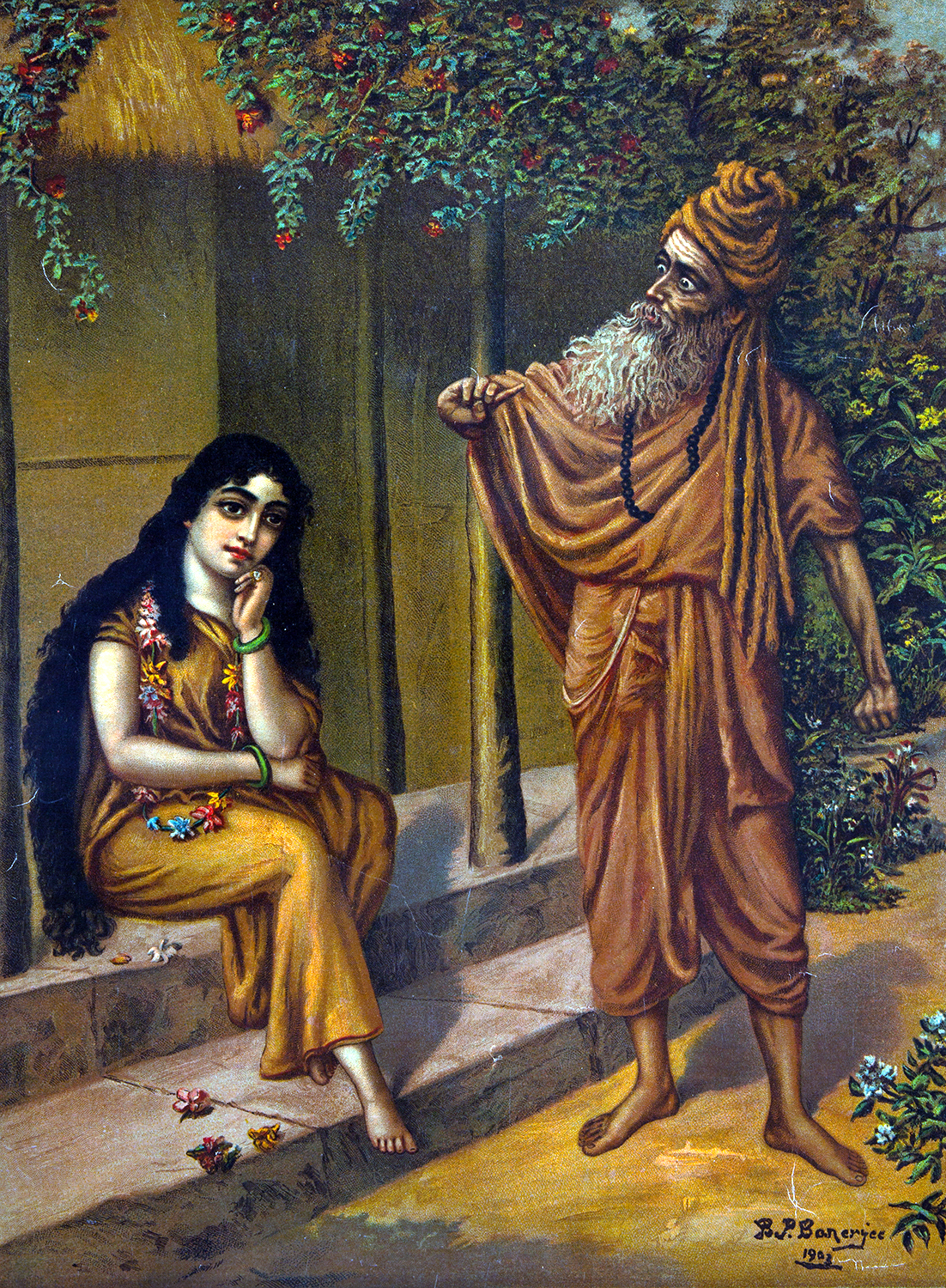
- A painting depicting Durvasa cursing Shakuntala

Personal life
- Spouse: Kandali
- Parents: Atri (father); Anasuya (mother); Dattareya (brother); Chandra (brother)

Religious life
- Religion: Hinduism

Durvasa (Sanskrit: दुर्वासा, IAST: Durvāsā lit."difficult to live with"), also known as Durvasas (Sanskrit: दुर्वासस्), is a legendary rishi (sage) in Hindu literature. He is the son of Anasuya and Atri. According to some Puranas, Durvasa is a partial avatar of Shiva, known for his irrascibility and short temper.

== Legend ==
=== Origin ===
According to Chapter 44 of the Brahmanda Purana, Brahma and Shiva got into a heated quarrel. Shiva became violently enraged when the devas fled from his presence in fear. His consort, Parvati, complained that Shiva is now impossible to live with. Realizing the chaos his anger had caused, Shiva deposited this anger into Anasuya, the wife of sage Atri. From this portion of Shiva deposited into Anasuya, a child is born, named 'Durvasa' (lit. one who is difficult to live with). Because he is born of Shiva's anger, he had an irascible nature.

=== Samudra Manthana ===
In Vishnu Purana, Vayu Purana, and the Padma Purana, a curse that Durvasa laid upon Indra is described as the indirect reason for the Samudra Manthana. The Srimad Bhagavata and Agni Purana also mention Durvasa's involvement in the episode, without going into detail. Other sources for this story, such as Ramayana, Mahabharata, Harivamsa, and Matsya Purana, do not mention Durvasa's involvement at all and ascribe the incident to other causes, such as the devas' and asuras' desire for immortality.

According to a story in the Vishnu Purana, Durvasa, while wandering the earth in a state of ecstasy due to a vow he is observing, came by a Vidyadhari (nymph of the air) and demanded her heavenly wreath of flowers. The nymph respectfully gave the garland to the sage, whereupon he wore it on his brow. Resuming his wanderings, the Durvasa came across Indra riding his elephant, Airavata, attended by the gods. Still, in his state of frenzy, Durvasa threw the garland at Indra, who caught it and placed it on Airavata's head. The elephant is irritated by the fragrance of the nectar in the flowers, so it threw the garland to the ground with its trunk.

Durvasa is enraged to see his gift treated so callously and cursed Indra that he would be cast down from his position of dominion over the three worlds, just as the garland is cast down. Indra immediately begged Durvasa's forgiveness, but the sage refused to retract or soften his curse. Because of the curse, Indra and the devas were diminished in strength and stripped of their lustre. Seizing this opportunity, the asuras led by Bali waged war against the gods.

The gods were routed and turned to Brahma for help. Brahma directed them to seek refuge with Vishnu. Vishnu, in turn, advised them to call a truce with the asuras, and help them churn the ocean of milk to obtain the amrita (nectar of immortality), on the pretext of sharing it with them. Vishnu promised that only the devas would drink the nectar to regain their former power, so they could once again defeat the asuras. The devas took Vishnu's advice and called their truce with the asuras, and thus the gods and demons began planning their great enterprise.

=== Ramayana ===
In the Uttara Kanda of Valmiki's Ramayana, Durvasa appeared at Rama's doorstep and, seeing Lakshmana guarding the door, demanded an audience with Rama. Meanwhile, Rama was having a private conversation with Yama (the god of death), disguised as an ascetic. Before the conversation, Yama gave Rama strict instructions that their dialogue is to remain confidential, and anyone who entered the room is to be executed. Rama agreed and entrusted Lakshmana with the duty of guarding his door and fulfilling his promise to Yama.

Hence, when Durvasa made his demand, Lakshmana politely asked the sage to wait until Rama had finished his meeting. Durvasa grew angry, and threatened to curse all of Ayodhya if Lakshmana did not immediately inform Rama of his arrival. Lakshmana, in a dilemma, decided it would be better that he alone die to save all of Ayodhya from falling under Durvasa's curse, and so interrupted Rama's meeting to inform him of the sage's arrival. Rama quickly concluded his meeting with Yama and received the sage with due courtesy. Durvasa told Rama of his desire to be fed, and Rama fulfilled his guest's request, whereupon the satisfied sage went on his way.

Rama is filled with sorrow, for he did not want to kill his beloved brother, Lakshmana. Still, he had given his word to Yama and could not go back on it. He called his advisers to help him resolve this quandary. On Vasishta's advice, he ordered Lakshmana to leave him for good, since such abandonment is equivalent to death, as far as the pious were concerned. Lakshmana then went to the banks of the Sarayu, and resolved on giving up the world by drowning himself in the Sarayu river.

=== Mahabharata ===
In the Mahabharata, Durvasa is known for granting boons to those who pleased him, particularly when he had been served well as an honoured guest. An example of such behaviour is the episode between him and Kunti, the future wife of Pandu and the mother of the Pandavas. When Kunti is a young girl, she lived in the house of her adopted father, Kuntibhoja. Durvasa visited Kuntibhoja one day and sought his hospitality. The king entrusted the sage to his daughter's care and tasked Kunti with the responsibility of entertaining the sage and meeting all his needs during his stay. Kunti patiently put up with Durvasa's temper and his unreasonable requests (such as demanding food at odd hours of the night) and served the sage with great dedication. Eventually, the sage is gratified. Before departing, he rewarded Kunti by teaching her the Atharvaveda mantras, which enables a woman to invoke any god of her choice to beget children by them. Curious and skeptical, Kunti decided to test the mantra.

After invoking Surya, the sun god, she bore her first son, Karna. Fearing the fate of an unmarried mother, she placed the newborn in a basket and set him afloat down a river. The infant Karna is later found and raised by Adhiratha, a charioteer for the monarch of Hastinapura, and his wife, Radha. Soon after this episode, Kunti is married to Pandu, the king of Hastinapur, and, by invoking those same mantras taught to her by Durvasa, she bore the three eldest of Pandu's five sons. Karna would go on to become an accomplished warrior and a formidable adversary of the Pandavas. This enmity would eventually culminate in his death on the battlefield of Kurukshetra at the hands of Arjuna, his younger half-brother, who is unaware of their fraternal bond.

Apart from his hair-trigger anger, Durvasa is also known for his extraordinary boons. According to the Shiva Purana, once while bathing in a river, Durvasa's clothes were carried away by the river's currents. Seeing this, Draupadi, who is nearby, gave her own clothes to the sage. Durvasa blessed her by saying that she would never lack clothes at the time of requirement, and it is due to his blessing that the Kauravas were unable to strip off her clothes in the gambling hall, thus protecting her modesty.

Another example of Durvasa's benevolent side is the incident when he granted Duryodhana a boon. During the Pandavas's exile, Durvasa and several disciples arrived at Hastinapura. Duryodhana with his maternal uncle Shakuni managed to gratify the sage. Durvasa is pleased enough to grant him a boon. Duryodhana, secretly wanting Durvasa to curse the Pandavas in anger, asked the sage to visit his cousins in the forest after Draupadi had eaten her meal, knowing that the Pandavas would then have nothing to feed him.

Durvasa and his disciples visited the Pandavas in their hermitage in the forest, as per Duryodhana's request. During this period of exile, the Pandavas would obtain their food by means of the Akshaya Patra, which would become exhausted each day once Draupadi finished her meal. Because Draupadi had already eaten by the time Durvasa arrived that day, there was no food left to serve him and the Pandavas were very anxious as to their fate should they fail to feed such a venerable sage. While Durvasa and his disciples were away bathing at the river, Draupadi prayed to Krishna for help.

Krishna immediately appeared before Draupadi, announcing that he was hungry and asked her for food. Draupadi grew exasperated, and said she had prayed to Krishna precisely because she had no food left to give. Krishna then told her to bring the Akshaya Patra to him. When she did, he partook of the lone grain of rice and a piece of vegetable that he found stuck to the vessel, and announced that he was satisfied by the "meal".

This satiated the hunger of Durvasa and his disciples, as the satisfaction of Krishna (An avatar of Vishnu himself) meant the satiation of the hunger of all living things. Sage Durvasa and his disciples then quietly left after their bath, without returning to the Pandavas's hermitage, for they were afraid of facing what they thought would be the Pandavas's wrath at their impolite behaviour of refusing the food that would be served to them.

== Curses and boons ==
The rishi Durvasa, being short-tempered, is said to have both cursed and gifted boons to several notable deities and people in the Hindu scriptures. Some of them include:

Curses

1. Indra, whom he cursed to lose all his powers, after Indra's elephant Airavata threw down a rather fragrant garland given by Durvasa to Indra.
2. Saraswati, whom he cursed to be born as a human because she laughed at his incorrect recitation of the Vedas.
3. Rukmini, whom he cursed to be separated from her husband, Krishna, because she drank water without seeking Durvasa's permission.
4. Shakuntala, who was so engrossed in thoughts of her husband Dushyanta that she did not offer Durvasa hospitality while at the ashrama (hermitage) of sage Kanva, which enraged Durvasa rishi, who cursed her that Dushyanta would forget her. Durvasa later relented that Dushyanta would remember her when she presented his ring (that he had previously given to her) to him.
5. Kandali, his wife, whom he cursed to be reduced to a heap of dust for excessively quarrelling with him.
6. Bhanumati, the daughter of Banu, the erstwhile leader of the Yadavas. Bhanumati provoked Durvasa while playing at the garden of Raivata, and in response, Durvasa cursed her. She, later in life, is abducted by the Danava Nikumbha. However, Durvasa clarified (after being pacified) that no harm would come to Bhanumati, and that she would be saved go on to marry the Pandava Sahadeva.
7. Ambarisha was a pious king who was a great devotee of Vishnu. The King received Durvasa as his guest and waited for a long time for him to return from his bath in the Yamuna, which the sage unreasonably delayed. In order to prevent demerit by not breaking Vaikuntha Ekadashi fast at the proper time, upon the advice of his priests, the king broke his fast by taking a little water, and waited for the arrival of sage Durvasa to offer him food. Durvasa was enraged at the King breaking his fast before feeding him and created his own discus or demon (depending on the sources) to attack the King to punish him. Vishnu sent his Sudarshana Chakra to the rescue and it destroyed all of Durvasa's creations which were meant to harm the King and chased the sage across the three worlds to teach him a lesson, until he returned and begged the King for forgiveness.

Boons

1. Krishna, whom he blessed with partial invulnerability. The Anushasana Parva, as related by Krishna to his son Pradyumna details the incident when Durvasa visited Krishna at Dvaraka, and requested that Krishna smear his own body with the payasam remaining after Durvasa had eaten. Krishna complied with this, and Durvasa blessed him with invulnerability in those parts of his body that he covered with the payasam, noting that Krishna never smeared the soles of his feet with it. Krishna would die years after the events of the Kurukshetra war by an arrow to his foot shot by a hunter who mistook it for a deer.
2. Kunti, whom he taught mantras capable of summoning a deva to beget children. Karna is born to Kunti, and later the five Pandava brothers are born of Kunti's and her co-wife Madri's use of the mantras.
3. Draupadi who gave him her clothes when his clothes were once swept away. Durvasa blessed her by saying that she would never lack clothes at the time of requirement, and it is due to his blessing that Dushasana was unable to strip off her clothes in the gambling hall due to lord krishna's presence, thus protecting her modesty.

== Swaminarayan Hinduism ==
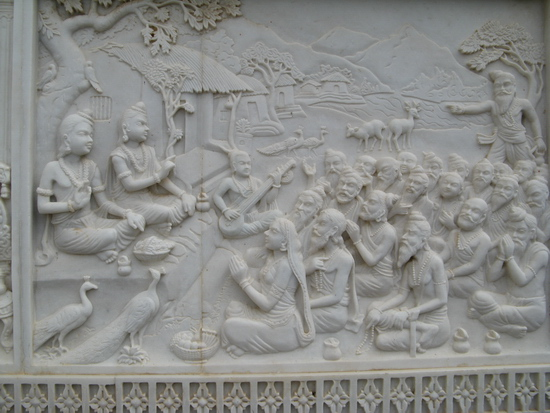
Durvasa curses Narayana.

According to the followers of Swaminarayan Hinduism, Narayana took birth as the saint Swaminarayan due to a curse by Durvasa. The story goes that shortly after Krishna's passing, Uddhava proceeded to Badrinath, the abode of Nara-Narayana. He joined the many divine sages and saints who were there listening to Nara-Narayana's discourses. As Nara is speaking, Durvasa arrived at the assembly from Mount Kailash, but no one noticed him because they were all so engrossed in the discourse.

He waited for one ghadi (24 minutes), for someone to welcome him with the respect he felt he is entitled to, but still, no one realized that he was there. Seeing no one rise to receive him, he took this as an insult, and cursed the entire assembly, saying that they would all be born as humans and suffer insults and agony from the wicked. Nara-Narayana's parents, the god Dharma and goddess Bhakti, pacified Durvasa, who then reduced his curse, saying that Narayana himself (represented here as the Supreme Being) would be born as Dharma and Bhakti's son, and that his birth would relieve them all from the clutches of evil. Proclaiming thus, Durvasa made his way back to Kailasha.

Dharma and Bhakti were eventually born as Hariprasad Pande (a.k.a. Dharmadev) and Premvati Pande (a.k.a. Bhaktidevi). Narayana is born as their son, named Ghanshyam, who is now known as Swaminarayan. The story is limited to Swaminarayan Hinduism, and no other Hindu scriptures support the tale.

== Temple ==
- Durvasa Rishi Ashram - Kharu Bab, Uttar Pradesh
