= Nala (Ramayana) =

Vanara (monkey), who is credited as the engineer of the Rama Setu

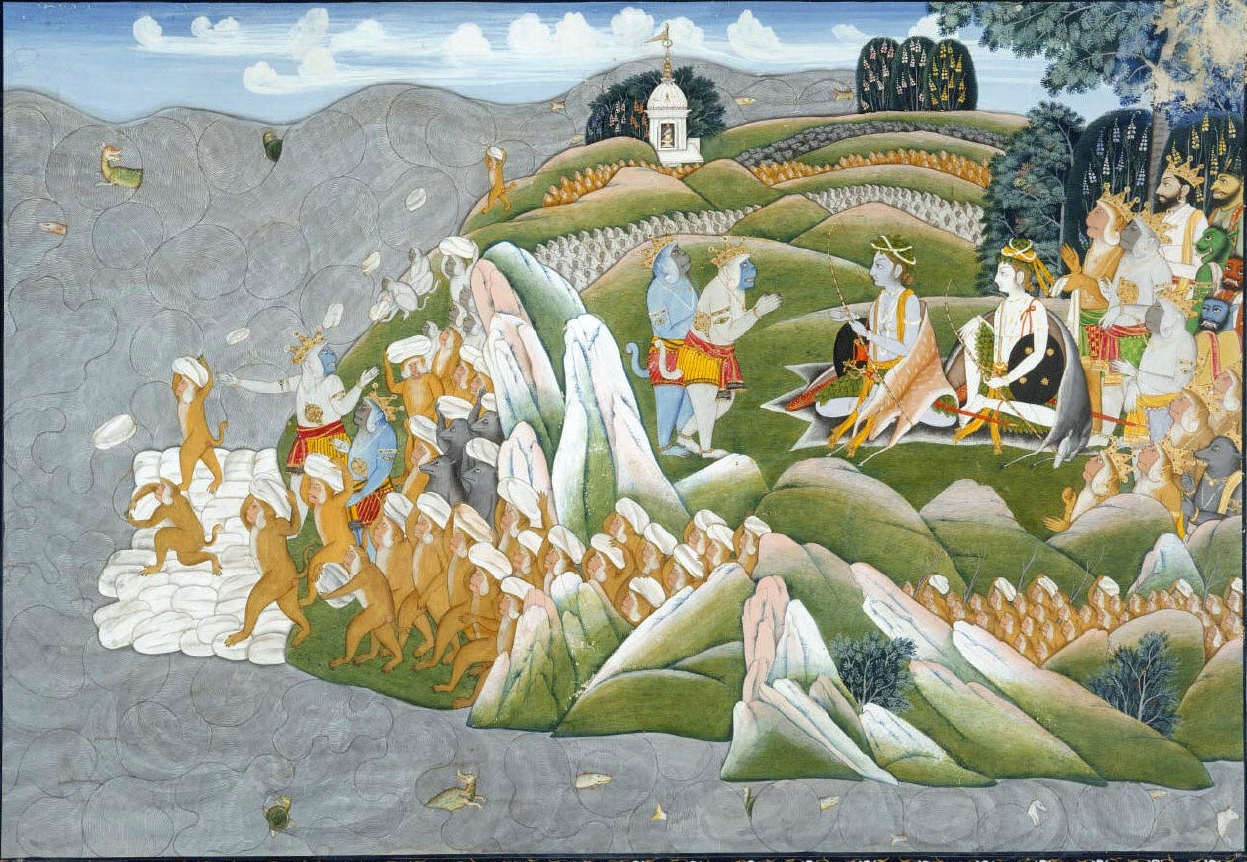
- Right:Nala (white monkey with blue face) and Nila (blue monkey) talking with Rama. Left: Nala and Nila directing the monkeys to place the stones in the ocean.

Information
- Race: Vanara
- Family: Vishwakarma (father); Nila (brother)

In the Hindu epic Ramayana, Nala (Sanskrit: नल, IAST: nala, lit. lotus), is the vanara (monkey), who is credited as the engineer of the Rama Setu, a bridge across the ocean between Rameswaram (Tamil nadu) and Lanka, identified with modern-day Sri Lanka, so forces of the god Rama can pass over to Lanka. The bridge is also known as Nala Setu, the bridge of Nala. Along with Nala, another vanara who is his twin brother called Nila is also credited as the builder of the bridge. Nala is described as the architect of the vanaras. He is described as the son of the architect-god Vishwakarma. Nala is also described to have fought in the battle between Rama and Ravana, the king of Lanka.

== Builder of the bridge ==
The Ramayana narrates that Sita - the wife of Rama, prince of Ayodhya and avatar of the god Vishnu - was kidnapped by Ravana, the rakshasa (demon) king of Lanka. Rama, aided by an army of vanaras (monkeys), reached the end of land and wanted to cross over to Lanka. Rama worships the god of the ocean, Varuna and requests him to make way. When Varuna does not appear before Rama, Rama starts shooting various weapons at the sea, which starts drying up. A terrified Varuna pleads to Rama. Though he refuses to give way, he gives Rama a solution. He tells Rama that Nala, the son of Vishwakarma - the architect of the gods, is amongst his vanara army; Nala has the necessary expertise of an architect, owing to a boon from his divine father. Varuna suggests that Rama construct a bridge across the ocean to Lanka, under the supervision of Nala. Nala volunteers for the task and also comments that the arrogance of the Ocean (Varuna) was tamed by Rama with a threat when love had failed. The vanaras fell mighty trees, and collect logs of wood and giant boulders and cast them in the sea. With the help of the vanara army, Nala completes the 30 miles (48 km) (ten yojana) bridge in just five days. Rama and his army pass over it and reach Lanka, where they prepare to fight Ravana.

Commentaries on the Ramayana elaborate the event. Nala is said to have been born when Vishwakarma embraced Nala's vanara mother and has an ejaculation. While some commentaries say that other monkeys merely collect the building material, Nala is the one who constructs the bridge; others says that the monkeys build the bridge under his directions. The Kamba Ramayana also solely credits Nala as the architect and builder of the bridge, the Ramacharitamanasa credits Nala and his brother Nila for the creation.

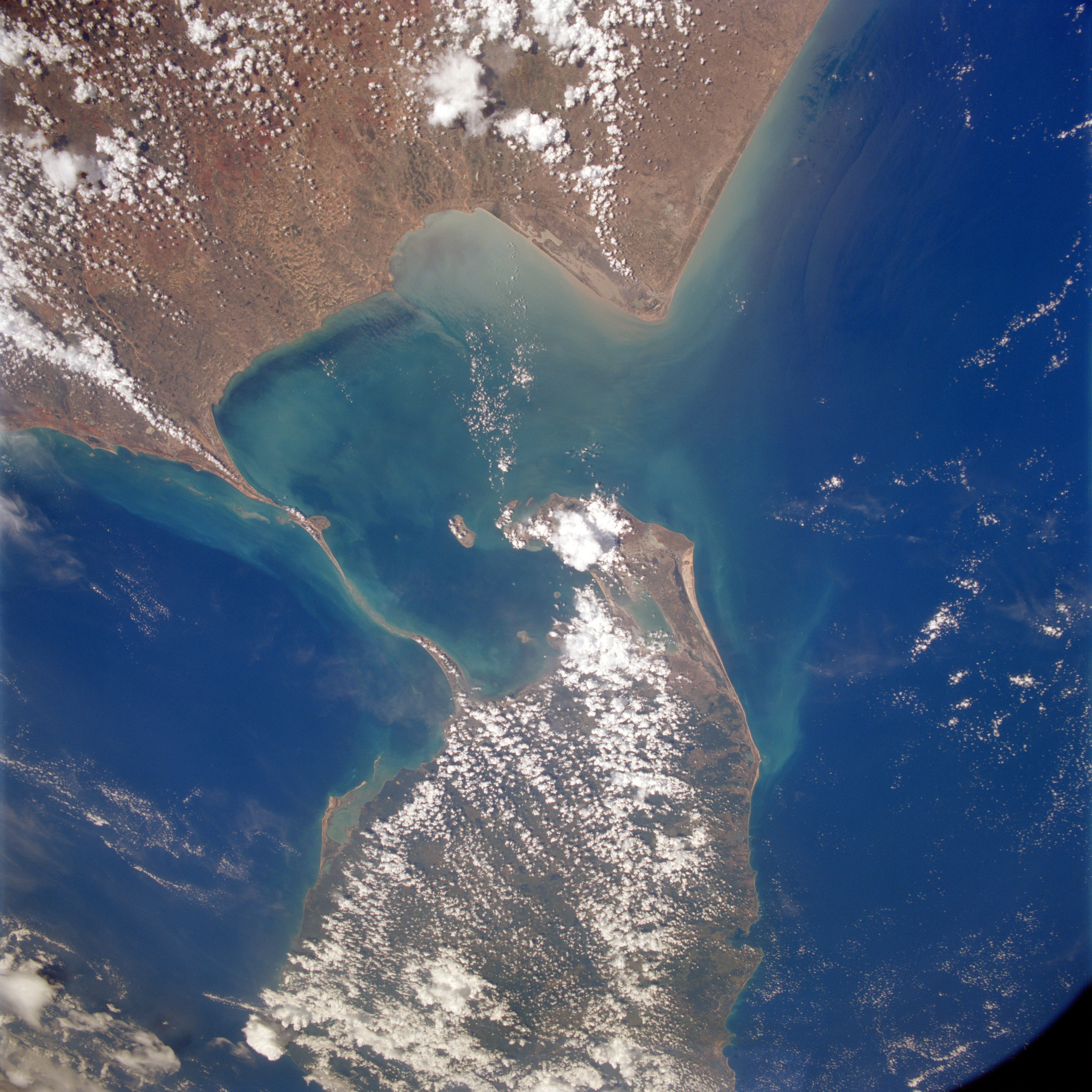
Rama Setu, NASA image.

In some versions, Nala is said to have the power to make stones float and, thus, easily makes the sea-bridge. In other versions, another vanara called Nila is also said to have this power and both Nala and Nila are described as builders of the bridge. The tale justifying this power states that in their youth, these monkeys were very mischievous and used to throw the murtis (holy images) worshipped by the sages in the water. As a remedy, the sages decreed that any stone thrown by them in water will not drown, thus saving the murtis. Another tale narrates as assured by Varuna, the stones dropped by Nala and Nila float, but they drift in the sea and do not form a continuous structure, Hanuman, Rama's devotee and monkey lieutenant suggests that the name of Rama be written, so they stick together; the remedy worked.

Telugu and Bengali adaptations of the Ramayana as well as Javanese shadow plays narrate about an argument between Nala and Hanuman. Hanuman feels insulted that Nala takes stones Hanuman fetches with the "impure" left hand and uses the "pure" right hand to place them in the ocean. Hanuman is pacified by Rama who explains him that is the tradition of workers to take from the left hand and place the object by the right.

The Ananda Ramayana, an adaptation of the Ramayana, says that Rama worships nine stones installed by Nala as the Navagraha deities before commencing the bridge.

== The battle ==
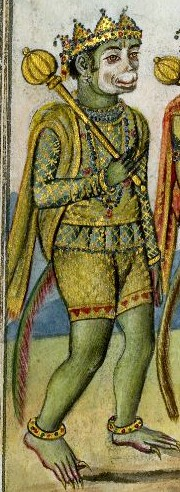
Nala, Company style.

The Kamba Ramayana portrays Nala also in charge of creating living quarters for the army of Rama in Lanka. He creates a city of tents of gold and gems for the army; but builds a simple house of bamboo and wood and grass beds for himself.

Nala fights in the battle led by Rama against Ravana and his rakshasa army. Nala is described to be seriously wounded by the arrows shot by Ravana's son Indrajit. Nala kills a rakshasa called Tapana in battle. The Mahabharata describes him fighting a giant called Tundaka.

== Jain Version ==
According to Jain texts, Nala took Jain Diksha and attained Moksha from Mangi-Tungi.
