= Nikumbha =

Name of multiple characters in Hinduism

Nikumbha (Sanskrit: निकुम्भ, romanized: Nikumbha) is the name of multiple beings in Hindu mythology, a rakshasa and a danava.

== Legend ==
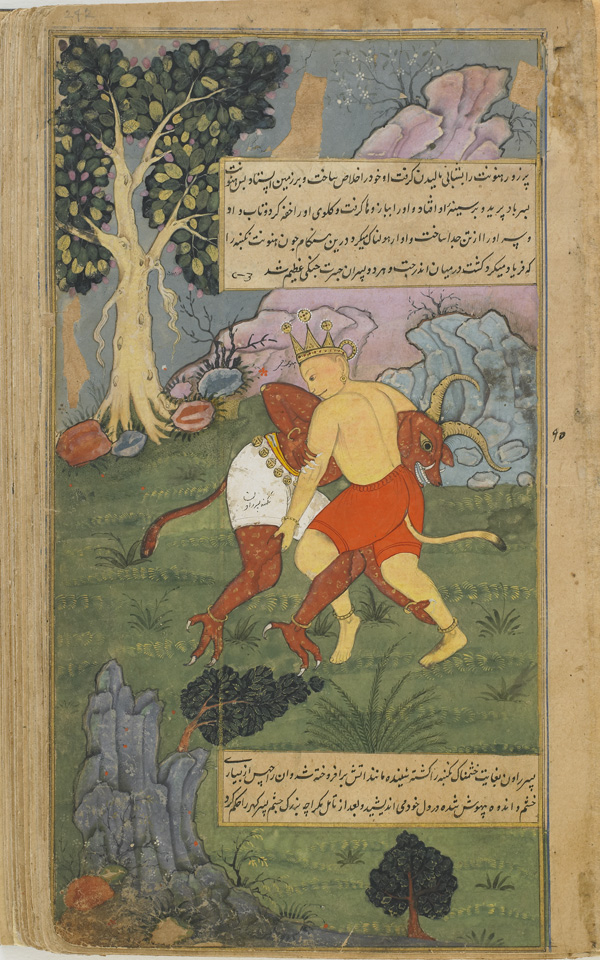
Nikumbha (left) is slain by Hanuman

=== Rakshasa Nikumbha ===
Nikumbha, the rakshasa, is the son of Kumbhakarna and Vajramala. He is instructed by Kubera to watch over the Pisacas (a type of evil spirit). The Nilamata Purana refers to him as "the noble and strong lord of the Pisacas."

Seeing Kumbha, his brother killed in battle, the enraged ran with an iron club towards the battle. Hanuman directly attacks Nikumbha, by striking his fist forcibly on Nikumbha's chest. Unmoved by that blow, Nikumbha lifts Hanuman off the ground. Hanuman in retaliation frees himself and throws down Nikumbha on the ground. Hanuman descends on Nikumbha, pounds his chest with his fist, catches his head and tears it off. Thus, Nikumbha dies at the hands of Hanuman.

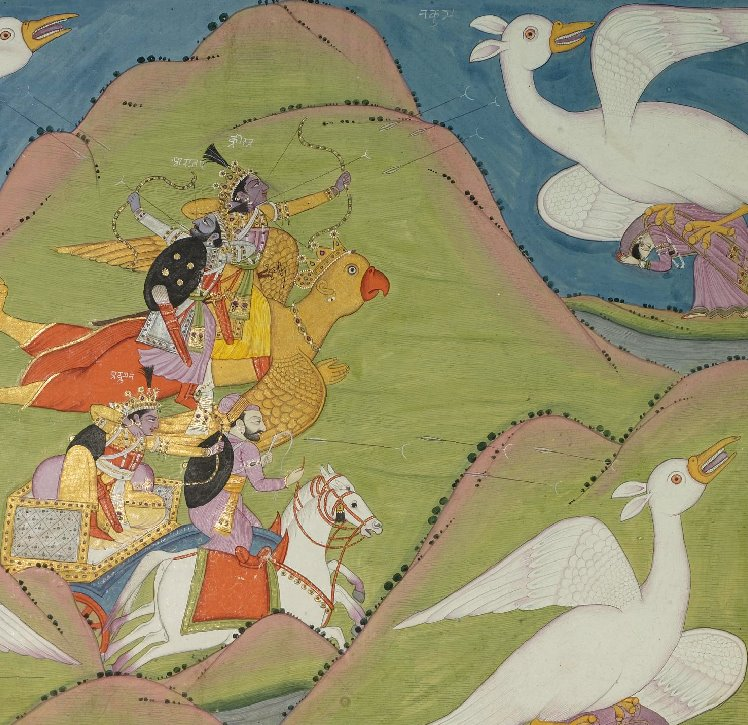
Krishna slays Nikumbha, in the form of a bird

=== Danava Nikumbha ===
Nikumbha, the danava, appears in a story of Krishna, where the deity, his brother Balarama, along with the rest of the Yadava clan undertake a pilgrimage to attend a festival. While the Yadavas engage in revelries, Nikumbha abducts a maiden among them named Bhanumati. While Krishna's son, Pradyumna, rescues Bhanumati, the deity himself slays the danava.
