= Charuvi Agrawal =

Indian painter, sculptor, animator, and visual artist

- Born: New Delhi, India
- Education: Sheridan College; College of Art
- Awards: Limca Book of Records
- Website: www.charuvi.com

Charuvi Agrawal (born 20 June 1983) is an Indian animator and filmmaker.

== Career ==
Charuvi Agrawal was mentioned in the Limca Book of World Records for her work in animation and digital art.

She directed the animated short film Shri Hanuman Chalisa (2013), produced by Charuvi Design Labs.

She is creator of the Indian animated television series The Legend of Hanuman She has also shared her experience working on the series in industry interviews.

In addition to animation, Agrawal created the Shri Hanuman Suspended Sculpture, a 25-foot installation composed of approximately 26,000 bells. As a traveling art installation, it has been exhibited at venues including the Indira Gandhi National Centre for the Arts (IGNCA), Select CITYWALK, the Red Fort, and in cities such as Mumbai and Pune.
