= List of Indian animated films =

This is a list of Indian animated films. It includes theatrical films, some important short films, direct-to-video releases and International films in which Indian production houses and studios were involved.

== Notable short films ==
Title	Year	Director(s)	Studio	Notes	Ref.
Agkadyanchi Mouj-The Game of Match Sticks	1915	Dadasaheb Phalke		First Indian stop-motion film	
The Pea Brothers	1934	Gunamoy Banerjee	MP Studios; Bharatlakshmi Studios	First animated film to get a theatrical release in India	
On a Moonlit Night	1934	Birendranath Sircar	New Theatres Calcutta	First Indian animated film with a soundtrack	
Cinema Kadhambam	1947	N. Thanu	Gemini Studios	First animated film in South India	
The Banyan Deer	1957	Shanti S. Sharma	Films Division of India; Films Division's Cartoon Unit	First film by Film Division's Cartoon Unit	
Inquiry	1967	C. T. Baptista		First film to win National Film Award for Best Non-Feature Animation Film	
Baap Re Baap	1968	Ram Mohan	Family Planning Association of India; Prasad Studios	National Award for the Best Film on family planning	
You Said It	1971	Ram Mohan	Prasad Studios	National Film Award for Best Non-Feature Animation Film	
Ek Anek Aur Ekta	1974	Vijaya Mulay	Films Division of India; National Council of Educational Research and Training (NCERT)	Educational short film aired on Doordarshan	
Fire Games	1983	Ram Mohan		National Film Award for Best Non-Feature Animation Film	
Taru	1984	Ram Mohan	Children's Film Society		
Deepa & Rupa: A Fairy Tale from India	1990	Manick Sorcar	Manick Sorcar Productions	Indian-American co-production First Indian film to combine live action and animation throughout the entire length	
Printed Rainbow	2006	Gitanjali Rao		Kodak Short Film Award at the International Critic's Week section of 2006 Cannes Film Festival	
Manpasand - The Perfect Match	2007	Dhvani Desai	Children's Film Society	Gold Remi Award 41st World Fest Houston USA Bronze World Medal New York Film Festival Diploma Award Prix Danube Slovakia IDPA Best Short Fiction Award	
True Love Story	2014	Gitanjali Rao		Screened in the International Critic's Week section of 2014 Cannes Film Festival	

== Feature films ==
Year	Title International title	Director(s)	Studio	Technique	Language	Notes
2000	Pandavas - The Five Warriors	Usha Ganesarajah	Pentamedia Graphics	CG animation	English	First animated feature film completely produced by an Indian studio National Film Award for Best Feature Film in English
2002	Alibaba	Usha Ganesarajah	Pentamedia Graphics	CG animation	English	
2003	Son of Aladdin; Mustafa and the Magician	Singeetam Srinivasa Rao	Pentamedia Graphics	CG animation	English	Released as Mustafa and the Magician in the United States in 2016 and was submitted for consideration for the animated feature film Oscar by this name
2005	Bhagmati: The Queen of Fortunes	Ashok Kaul	Zee Telefilms; Zee Institute of Creative Arts (ZICA)	Live-action; Traditional	Hindi	Some parts and characters are in live-action.
2005	Hanuman	V.G Samant	Percept Picture Company	Traditional	Hindi	Won Producers Guild Award for Best Special Effects
2005	Gulliver's Travel	Anita Udeep	Pentamedia Graphics	CG animation	English	
2005	Sahibzadey: A Saga of Valor & Sacrifice	Sukhwinder Singh Vismaad	Vismaad	Traditional	Punjabi	First Punjabi animated feature film Direct-to-video release
2006	Bal Hanuman	Pankaj Sharma	Astute Media Vision; Eagle Home Entertainment	CG animation	Hindi	Direct-to-video release
2006	Kittu	B. Sathya	Bhargava Pictures	Traditional	Telugu	First animated film to be made in the Telugu language National Film Award for Best Animated Film
2006	Krishna	Aman khan	Shethia Audio Video Pvt. Ltd.	CG animation	Hindi	
2006	Banda Singh Bahadur	Sukhwinder Singh Vismaad	Vismaad	Traditional	Punjabi	Direct-to-video release
2007	Inimey Nangathan; Desi Pundits	Venkybabu	Maayabhimbham Media P Ltd	CG animation	Tamil	National Film Award for Best Animated Film
2007	Bal Ganesh	Pankaj Sharma	Shemaroo Entertainment; Astute Media Vision	CG animation	Hindi	
2007	Return of Hanuman	Anurag Kashyap	Percept Picture Company; Toonz Animation India	Traditional	Hindi	
2007	Luv Kush - The Amazing Twins	Rana	Shoreline Animation	Traditional	Hindi	
2008	Ghatothkach	Singeetam Srinivasa Rao	Shemaroo Entertainment; Sun Animatics	Traditional	Hindi	
2008	Dashavatar	Bhavik Thakore	Anushvi Production; Phoebus Media	Flash animation	Hindi	
2008	Cheenti Cheenti Bang Bang	R.D Mallik	Elecom Fiesta Production	Traditional	Hindi	
2008	Roadside Romeo	Jugal Hansraj	Walt Disney Pictures; Yash Raj Films; Disney World Cinema; Tata Elxsi	CG animation	Hindi	National Film Award for Best Animated Film; Nominated for Visual Effects Society Award for Outstanding Animation in an Animated Motion Picture
2008	Jai Vigneshwara	James Cliford	Pentamedia Graphics	Flash animation	English	
2008	Sundri: The Brave Kaur	Sukhwinder Singh Vismaad	Vismaad	Traditional	Punjabi	
2008	Jumbo	Kompin Kemgumnird	Percept Picture Company	CG animation	Hindi	
2009	Bal Ganesh 2	Pankaj Sharma	Shemaroo Entertainment; Astute Media Vision	CG animation	Hindi	Sequel to the 2007 film
2009	Keibu Keioiba	Bhumenjoy Konsam	Makok Production Studio	CG animation	Meitei	
2010	Pangaa Gang	Pankaj Sharma	Shemaroo Entertainment; Astute Media Vision	CG animation	Hindi	
2010	Bal Hanuman 2	Pankaj Sharma	Astute Media Vision	CG animation	Hindi	Direct-to-video release Second film in the Bal Hanuman series
2010	Bal Hanuman: Return of the Demon	Pankaj Sharma	Astute Media Vision	CG animation	Hindi	Direct-to-video release Third film in Bal Hanuman series
2010	Bird Idol	Jyotin Goel	Goel Screencraft; Irealities Technology	CG animation	Hindi	
2010	Lava Kusa: The Warrior Twins	Dhavala Satyam	Kanipakam Creations; RVLM Animation	Traditional	Hindi	
2010	Baru-The Wonder Kid	Sachin Gote	Lemon N Yellow Productions; Shri Vishnu Entertainment	CG animation	Hindi	
2010	Ramayana: The Epic	Chetan Desai	Maya Digital Media; Warner Bros. India	CG animation	Hindi	
2010	Toonpur Ka Super Hero	Kireet Khurana	Big Screen Entertainment; Eros International; Panorama Studios; Climb Media	CG animation Live-action	Hindi	First Indian live action - 3D animation combination feature film
2011	Ashoka The Hero	Gaurav Jain	Illusion Interactive	CG animation	Hindi	
2011	Crackers	Anil Goyal	RTM Technologies Pvt Ltd	CG animation	Hindi	Direct-to-video release
2011	Super K - The Movie; Kiara The Brave	Vijay S. Bhanushali; Smita Maroo	Shemaroo Entertainment; A Point Studio	CG animation	Hindi	Direct-to-video release
2012	Bal Hanuman 4: Attack on the Universe	Pankaj Sharma	Astute Media Vision	CG animation	Hindi	Direct-to-video release Fourth film in the Bal Hanuman series
2012	Chhota Bheem and the Curse of Damyaan	Rajiv Chilaka	Green Gold Animation	CG animation	Hindi	First theatrical release of Chhota Bheem franchise
2012	Arjun: The Warrior Prince	Arnab Chaudhuri	Disney World Cinema; UTV Motion Pictures; Disney India; Tata Elxsi	CG animation	Hindi	FICCI BAF Award for Best Indian Animated Feature Film (Theatrical Release); Nominated for Grand Prix at 2013 Annecy International Animated Film Festival
2012	Krishna Aur Kans; Hey Krishna	Vikram Veturi	Reliance Entertainment	Flash Animation	Hindi	
2012	Delhi Safari; Jungle Safari	Nikhil Advani	Krayon Pictures	CG animation	Hindi	National Film Award for Best Animated Film; FICCI BAF Award for Best Indian Animated Feature Film (Theatrical Release)
2012	Sons of Ram	Kushal Ruia	Maya Digital Studios; ACK Animation Studios; Cartoon Network India	CG animation	Hindi	
2012	Chooran Goli	Pankaj Sharma	Astute Media Vision	CG animation	Hindi	Direct-to-video release
2012	Keymon & Nani in Space Adventure	RK Deepak	DQ Entertainment; Viacom18 Motion Pictures	CG animation	Hindi	Based on Nickelodeon India's TV series Keymon Ache; Released in four cities: Mumbai, Pune, Delhi and Bangalore
2012	Swami Ayyappan	Chetan Sharma; Mahesh Vettiyar	Toonz Animation India; Animagic	CG animation	Malayalam	
2012	Bhai Subeg Singh Shahbaz Singh	Sukhwinder Singh Vismaad	Vismaad	Traditional	Punjabi	
2013	The Adventures of Sinbad	Shinjan Neogi; Abhishek Panchal	Lodi Films Pvt. Ltd	Flash animation	Hindi	
2013	Gunja A Wonder Girl	Reshma Jaiswal	Rudra Eye Network	CG animation	Hindi	
2013	Bablu-The Naughty Genie	Pankaj Sharma	Astute Media Vision	CG animation	Hindi	Direct-to-video release
2013	Chhota Bheem and the Throne of Bali	Rajiv Chilaka	Green Gold Animation	CG animation	Hindi	Second theatrical release of Chhota Bheem franchise
2013	Savita Bhabhi	Puneet Agarwal	Kirtu	CG animation	Hindi	Web film
2013	Once Upon a Time	Binu Sasidharan	FX3 Productions; VIPs International	CG animation	Malayalam	
2013	Shivalika	Biman Sengupta; Bhagabat Kar	3D Wizards Pvt Ltd.; Eastern Media Ltd.	CG animation	Hindi	
2013	Chhatrapati Shivaji - The Emperor of People's Pride	Azhar Khan	Aman Anam Productions	CG animation	Marathi; Hindi; English	First multilingual Indian animated film
2013	Ghatothkach 2	Vijay S. Bhanushali; Smita Maroo	Shemaroo Entertainment; Gold Toonz	CG animation	Hindi	Direct-to-video sequel to the 2008 film
2013	Goopi Gawaiya Bagha Bajaiya; The World of Goopi and Bagha	Shilpa Ranade	Paperboat Animation Studios Children's Film Society of India	Flash animation	Hindi	Nominated for Asia Pacific Screen Award for Best Animated Feature Film; FICCI BAF Award for Best Indian Animated Feature Film (Theatrical Release)
2013	Mahabharat	Amaan Khan	Pen India Limited	CG animation	Hindi	
2014	Mighty Raju : Rio Calling	Rajiv Chilaka	Green Gold Animation	CG animation	Hindi; English	First theatrical release of Mighty Raju franchise FICCI BAF Award for Best Indian Animated Feature Film (Theatrical Release)
2014	Kochadaiiyaan	Soundarya Rajinikanth	Eros International; Media One Global Entertainment; Cinemorphic	CG animation	Tamil	India's first photorealistic motion capture film
2014	Chaar Sahibzaade	Harry Baweja	Baweja Movies; Irealities Technology	CG animation	Punjabi	
2015	Bal Ganesh 3	Vijay S, Bhanushali	Shemaroo Entertainment; Gold Toonz	CG animation	Hindi	Direct-to-video
2016	Chhota Bheem Himalayan Adventures	Rajiv Chilaka	Green Gold Animation	CG animation	Hindi	Third theatrical release of Chhota Bheem franchise FICCI BAF Award for Best Indian Animated Feature Film (Theatrical Release)
2016	Motu Patlu: King Of Kings	Suhas D. Kadav	Viacom 18 Motion Pictures; Cosmos Entertainment; Maya Digital Studios	CG animation	Hindi	First theatrical film based on Motu Patlu TV series
2016	Mahayoddha Rama	Rohit Vaid	Contiloe Pictures	CG animation	Hindi	National Film Award for Best Animated Film
2016	Chaar Sahibzaade: Rise of Banda Singh Bahadur	Harry Baweja	Eros International; Baweja Movies; Prime Focus	CG animation	Punjabi	Sequel to the 2014 film
2016	Sarvagunakar Srimanta Sankardeva	Manju Borah	AM Television	CG animation	Assamese	First animated film in Assamese language
2016	Azzu & Gazzu - International Super Detectives	More Avinash More Pradnya	Magicwand Animation	CG animation	English	
2017	Hanuman Da' Damdaar	Ruchi Narain	R.A.T Films; Percept Picture Company	Flash animation	Hindi	
2018	Prabho Shivaji Raja	Nitesh Muley	Ganraj Entertainment	Traditional	Marathi	First animated film in Marathi language
2018	Bhai Taru Singh	Sukhwinder Singh Vismaad	Vismaad Animation Studio	CG animation	Punjabi	
2018	Hanuman vs Mahiravana	Ezhil Vendan	Green Gold Animations	CG animation	Hindi	
2018	Guru Da Banda	Jassi Chana	Pritam Film Production	CG animation	Punjabi	
2019	Chhota Bheem Kung Fu Dhamaka	Rajiv Chilaka	Green Gold Animations	CG animation	Hindi	Fourth theatrical film of Chhota Bheem series
2019	Bombay Rose	Gitanjali Rao	Cinestaan Film Company	CG animation	Hindi	Netflix original film
2019	Dastaan - E - Miri Piri	Vinod Lanjewar	White Hill Studios; Chathampeer Productions	CG animation	Punjabi	Originally scheduled to release theatrically on 5 June 2019, it was postponed after objections from Sikh community. It was released in Australia on 30 May 2019. It was released on YouTube on 31 October 2022.
2019	Up Up & Up	Govind Nihalani	Blue Lion Entertainment Co.	CG animation	English	Direct-to-video release
2019	Punyakoti; A Truthful Mother	Ravishankar Venkateswaran	Puppetica Media	Flash animation	Sanskrit	First Sanskrit language animation film Direct-to-video release
2020	Dhira	Arun Kumar Rapolu	A Theorem Studios	CG animation	Telugu	
2020	Captain Vidyut	Atish Tipathi	Parijat Animation Films	Flash animation	Hindi	Direct-to-video release
2020	Karmachakra	Rajorshi Basu	Studio Durga	Traditional	Bengali	
2022	Supreme Motherhood- Journey of Mata Sahib Kaur	Karandeep Singh	iRealities Studios; Nihal Nihal Nihal Productions	CG animation	Punjabi	
2023	Kundan Satti	P. K. Aghasthi	Shellammal Movie Makers	CG animation	Tamil	
2023	Return of the Jungle	Vaibhav Kumaresh	Vaibhav Studios	CG animation	Hindi	Premiered at 54th International Film Festival of India in 2023, theatrically released in India on 29 May 2026.
2024	Appu	Prosenjit Ganguly	Appu Series Productions	CG Animation	Hindi	
2024	Luv You Shankar	Rajiv S. Ruia	SBM Studio	CG animation Live-action	Hindi	
2024	Mahavatar Narsimha	Ashwin Kumar	Kleem Productions, Hombale Films	CG animation	Multilingual	
2026	Mahaprabhu Jagannath	Shripad Warkhedkar	Ele Animations, Toonz Media Group	Flash animation	Multilingual	The first animated film from Odisha.

== International co-productions ==
Title	Year	Director(s)	Company credit(s)	Countries involved	Technique(s)	Box office gross (worldwide)	Note(s)
Ramayana: The Legend of Prince Rama	1992	Yugo Sako; Koichi Sasaki; Ram Mohan	Nippon Ramayana Film Co.	(Japan) (India)	Traditional animation	—N/a	—N/a
Sinbad: Beyond the Veil of Mists	2000	Alan Jacobs; Evan Ricks	Pentamedia Graphics; Improvision Corporation	(United States) (India)	Computer animation	$29,245	First computer-animated feature film created exclusively using motion capture
The Legend of Buddha	2004	Shamboo S. Phalke	Pentamedia Graphics; Economic Development Board of Singapore; Kingdom Animasia Inc.	(India) (Singapore) (Philippines)	Traditional animation	—N/a	—N/a
Alpha and Omega	2010	Anthony Bell; Ben Gluck	Crest Animation Productions	(Canada) (India) (United States)	Computer animation	$50,507,267	—N/a
Gaturro	2010	Gustavo Cova	Illusion Studios; Toonz Media Group; Ánima Estudios	(Mexico) (India) (Argentina)	Computer animation	$2,157,668	FICCI BAF Award for Best Indian Animated Feature Film (Theatrical Release)
The Prodigies	2011	Antoine Charreyron	Onyx Films; Studio 37; Fidelite Films; DQ Entertainment; LuxAnimation; Norman Studios	(France) (India) (Belgium) (Luxembourg) (United Kingdom) (Canada)	Computer animation	$1,335,728	—N/a
The Swan Princess Christmas	2012	Richard Rich	Crest Animation Productions; Nest Family Entertainment; Sony Pictures Home Entertainment	(United States) (India) (South Korea)	Computer animation	—N/a	Direct-to-video release
Batu Gaiden – The Return of Asi	2013	Masatsugu Arakawa	Zero-Sum; Level 10 Entertainment; Thanks Lab	(Japan) (India)	Traditional animation	—N/a	—N/a
Saving Santa	2013	Leon Joosen; Aaron Seelman	Gateway Films; Prana Studios	(United States) (India) (United Kingdom)	Computer animation	—N/a	Direct-to-video release
Walking with Dinosaurs	2013	Neil Nightingale; Barry Cook	Reliance Entertainment; IM Global; BBC Earth; Evergreen Films; Animal Logic	(United States) (India) (United Kingdom) (Australia)	Computer animation Live-action	$126,546,518	Computer-animated dinosaurs in live-action settings
The Swan Princess: A Royal Family Tale	2014	Richard Rich	Crest Animation Productions; Nest Family Entertainment; Sony Wonder; Sony Pictures Home Entertainment	(United States) (India) (South Korea)	Computer animation	—N/a	Direct-to-video release
The Jungle Book	2014	Jun Falkenstein; Kevin Johnson	DQ Entertainment	(France) (India)	Computer animation	—N/a	Direct-to-video release
Legends of Oz: Dorothy's Return	2014	Will Finn; Dan St. Pierre	Summertime Entertainment; Prana Studios	(United States) (India)	Computer animation	$18,662,027	—N/a
The Hero of Color City	2014	Frank Gladstone	Exodus Film Group	(United States) (India) (China)	Computer animation	$115,335	—N/a
Wicked Flying Monkeys	2015	Alberto Mar	Ánima Estudios; Discreet Arts	(Mexico) (India)	Computer animation	$1,801,137	—N/a
Blinky Bill the Movie	2015	Deane Taylor	Assemblage Entertainment; Flying Bark Productions; Telegael; Screen Australia	(Australia) (India) (United States)	Computer animation	$4,057,115	—N/a
Top Cat Begins	2015	Andrés Couturier	Ánima Estudios; Discreet Arts; Prana Studios	(Mexico) (India)	Computer animation	$4,571,429	Based on the animated television series Top Cat by Hanna-Barbera; Prequel to Top Cat: The Movie (2011)
Norm of the North	2016	Trevor Wall	Splash Entertainment; Assemblage Entertainment; Telegael	(United States) (India) (Republic of Ireland)	Computer animation	$27,426,112	—N/a
The Swan Princess: Princess Tomorrow, Pirate Today	2016	Richard Rich; Brian Nissen	Crest Animation Productions; Nest Family Entertainment; Streetlight Productions; Sony Wonder; Sony Pictures Home Entertainment	(United States) (India)	Computer animation	—N/a	Direct-to-video release
Bunyan and Babe	2017	Louis Ross	Exodus Film Group; Toonz Entertainment	(United States) (India)	Computer animation	—N/a	Digital distribution release
Monster Island	2017	Leopoldo Aguilar	Ánima Estudios; Discreet Art Productions	(Mexico) (India)	Computer animation	—N/a	—N/a
The Swan Princess: Royally Undercover	2017	Richard Rich	Crest Animation Productions; Nest Family Entertainment; Sony Wonder; Streetlight Productions; Sony Pictures Home Entertainment	(United States) (India) (South Korea)	Computer animation	—N/a	Direct-to-video release
The Shonku Diaries: A Unicorn Adventure	2017	Kamal Bansal	Turtle in Motion Studios	(United States) (India) (Turkey)	Computer animation	—N/a	—N/a

== Unreleased/shelved films ==
Title	Notes
Alibaba Aur 41 Chor	
Andaz Naya Naya	Animated remake of the 1994 film Andaz Apna Apna
Koochie Koochie Hota Hai	Animated remake of the 1998 film Kuch Kuch Hota Hai

== Live action films with animated sequence(s) ==
Year	Film	Language	Notes
1957	Ab Dilli Dur Nahin	Hindi	In song "Chun Chun Karati Aai Chidiyaa"
1958	Chalti Ka Naam Gaadi	Hindi	Title sequence
1968	Padosan	Hindi	Title sequence
1968	Haseena Maan Jayegi	Hindi	Title sequence
1974	Mouchak	Bengali	Title sequence
1976	Chhoti Si Baat	Hindi	Title sequence
1977	Shatranj Ke Khilari	Urdu	
1978	Pati Patni Aur Woh	Hindi	In song "Na Aaj Tha Na Kal Tha"
1980	Khubsoorat	Hindi	In song "Qayda Qayda"
1980	Do Aur Do Paanch	Hindi	Title sequence
1981	Biwi-O-Biwi	Hindi	Title sequence
1982	Kaamchor	Hindi	
1983	Katha	Hindi	
1983	Gupchup Gupchup	Marathi	Title sequence
1989	Raja Chinna Roja	Tamil	
1990	Baap Numbri Beta Dus Numbri	Hindi	Title sequence
1990	Bobbili Raja	Telugu	In song "Kanya Kumari"
1992	Chamatkar	Hindi	Title sequence
1993	Waqt Hamara Hai	Hindi	Title sequence
1993	O' Faby	Malayalam	
1996	Daraar	Hindi	In song "Ek Ladki Mera Naam Jo Le"
1998	Bade Miyan Chote Miyan	Hindi	Title sequence
1998	Duplicate	Hindi	CGI effect of eyes popping out of Shah Rukh Khan's character Babloo at the end of the song "Mere Mehboob Mere Sanam"
2000	Raju Chacha	Hindi	
2001	Aalavandhan	Tamil	
2001	Nayak: The Real Hero	Hindi	In song "Saiyyan Pakad Baiyyan"
2002	Raaz	Hindi	Some scenes used CGI such as the electric current choking Ashutosh Rana's character or the swinging lemon turning red when they detect Malini's dead body
2003	Main Prem Ki Diwani Hoon	Hindi	
2004	Hum Tum	Hindi	
2004	Shaadi Ka Laddoo	Hindi	In song "Chal Hatt"
2006	Bhoot Unkle	Hindi	
2007	Ta Ra Rum Pum	Hindi	In song "Ta Ra Rum Pum"
2007	My Friend Ganesha	Hindi	Live-action film with animated titular character and animated sequences
2007	Taare Zameen Par	Hindi	
2008	Thoda Pyaar Thoda Magic	Hindi	
2008	God Tussi Great Ho	Hindi	
2008	Rab Ne Bana Di Jodi	Hindi	In song "Phir Milenge Chalte Chalte"
2009	Detective Naani	Hindi	
2009	My Friend Ganesha 2	Hindi	Live-action film with animated titular character
2009	Chandni Chowk to China	Hindi	
2009	Kick	Telugu	
2010	Bhoot and Friends	Hindi	
2010	Toonpur Ka Superrhero	Hindi	
2010	My Friend Ganesha 3	Hindi	Live-action film with animated titular character
2010	Tees Maar Khan	Hindi	In song "Tees Maar Khan"
2011	Rascals	Hindi	Title sequence
2011	Ready	Hindi	Title sequence
2011	Ra.One	Hindi	Demonstration of H.A.R.T and Ra.One game introduction sequences
2012	Eega	Telugu	Live action animation of the fly protagonist
2012	Joker	Hindi	
2013	Main Krishna Hoon	Hindi	
2014	Kick	Hindi	
2015	O Kadhal Kanmani	Tamil	
2015	Kick 2	Telugu	
2015	Shaandaar	Hindi	
2015	Munde Kamaal De	Punjabi	Title sequence
2016	Brahman Naman	English	Title sequence
2016	A Flying Jatt	Hindi	
2017	Ok Jaanu	Hindi	
2017	Kaabil	Hindi	
2017	Vikram Vedha	Tamil	
2018	102 Not Out	Hindi	
2018	Kaala	Tamil	
2018	Lust Stories	Hindi	Title sequence
2020	Ghost Stories	Hindi	Title sequence
2020	Paava Kadhaigal	Tamil	
2020	Chintu Ka Birthday	Hindi	
2022	Karthikeya 2	Telugu	
2024	Hanu-Man	Telugu	
2024	Amar Singh Chamkila	Hindi	
2024	Kalki 2898 AD	Telugu	In song "Wait of Ashwatthama (Keshava)"
2024	Indian 2	Tamil	

== TV films ==
=== Cartoon Network ===
- Arjun and the Adventure of Ice Lotus
- Batu Gaiden
- Chakra: The Invincible
- Kid Krrish: The Rise ^{(2 October 2013)}
- Kid Krrish: Mission Bhutan ^{(19 July 2014)}
- Kid Krrish: Mystery in Mongolia ^{(27 September 2014)}
- Kid Krrish: Shakalaka Africa ^{(25 April 2015)}
- Krish, Trish and Baltiboy
- Krishna (film series)
  - Krishna: The Birth
  - Krishna in Vrindavan
  - Krishna: Kansa Vadha
  - Krishna: Maakhan Chor
- My Name Is Raj
- My Name Is Raj 2
- My Name Is Raj 3: Attack of Demons
- My Name Is Raj 4: Vizukama Ki Takaar ^{(17 March 2014)}
- My Name is Raj 5: Return of Zohak ^{(19 April 2015)}
- Roll No 21 and the Quest for Swarnamani
- Roll No 21 -Space Mein Dhoom Dhadaka ^{(11 January 2014)}
- Roll No 21: Time Ki Bhool Bhulaiya
- Roll No:21 - Ticket to Australia ^{(31 January 2015)}
- Lights, camera, Roll No 21 - Kris in Bollywood
- Roll No 21 Scooba Dooba Ajooba
- Roll No 21 Ticket To China
- Roll No 21 Ticket To Japan
- Roll No 21 Voyage To Aquatica
- Roll No 21 Get Set Go Kris
- Roll No 21 Kris Aur Phantom Ka Raaz
- Roll No 21 Kris Aur Shoonya Registan
- Tripura - The Three Cities of Maya ^{(20 January 2011)}
- Vikram Betal

=== Discovery Kids ===
- Little Singham Aur Kaal Ka Mahajaal
- Little Singham Mission Jai Hind
- Little Singham Desh Ka Sipaahi
- Little Singham Chala London

=== Disney Channel ===
- Apna Bhai Gaju Bhai
- Feluda: The Kathmandu Caper

=== DD National ===
- Krish, Trish & Baltiboy: Bharat Hain Hum

=== Hungama TV ===
- Chacha Bhatija Khazane Ki Khoj
- Chacha Bhatija Golmaal Hai Bhai Sab Golmaal Hai
- Fatak Patak: Sheru Aur Alienoid Gabru
- Fatak Patak: Sheru Aur Eagon Ka Aakraman
- Fatak Patak: Sheru Aur Titan Taapu Ka Rahasya
- Fatak Patak: Sheru Aur Baaku Ka Kala Saya

=== Nickelodeon India ===
- Motu Patlu in Wonderland!
- Motu Patlu: Mission Moon
- Motu Patlu: Deep Sea Adventure
- Motu Patlu: Kung-Fu Kings
- Motu Patlu: Khazaane Ki Race
- Motu Patlu: Kung Fu Kings Returns
- Motu Patlu in Carnival Island!
- Motu Patlu: 36 Ghante Race
- Motu Patlu in Alien World!
- Motu Patlu in Double Trouble
- Motu Patlu: The Invisible Plane
- Kung Fu Kings 5: Motu Patlu and Robo Kids
- Motu Patlu in The Game of Zones
- Pakdam Pakdai Attack on Tokyo
- Pakdam Pakdai: Doggy Don in Egypt
- Pakdam Pakdai Doggy Don vs Billiman (Note: FICCI BAF Award for Best Indian Animated film [Direct-to-DVD (Home Video) / Telefilms])
- Pakdam Pakdai Ocean Attack
- Pakdam Pakdai Space Attack
- Rudra: Dawn of the Dangerous Dongreela
- Rudra: Return of the Cage Magician

=== Pogo ===
- Chhota Bheem Aur Krishna
- Chhota Bheem & Krishna: Pataliputra- City of the Dead
- Chhota Bheem: Bheem vs Aliens
- Chhota Bheem: Journey To Petra
- Chhota Bheem & Krishna: Mayanagari
- Chhota Bheem: Master of Shaolin
- Chhota Bheem: Dholakpur to Kathmandu (Note: FICCI BAF Award for Best Indian Animated film [Direct-to-DVD (Home Video) / Telefilms])
- Chhota Bheem Aur Hanuman
- Chhota Bheem: The Rise of Kirmada
- Chhota Bheem Aur Ganesh: In The Amazing Odyssey
- Chhota Bheem and the Broken Amulet
- Chhota Bheem And The Crown of Valahalla
- Chhota Bheem and the Incan Adventure
- Chhota Bheem aur Krishna vs Zimbara
- Chhota Bheem And The Shinobi Secret
- Chhota Bheem Neeli Pahaadi
- Chhota Bheem Banjara Masti
- Chhota Bheem Dus Pe Dus
- Chhota Bheem Mayavi Gorgan
- Chhota Bheem Ki Baazi
- Chhota Bheem aur Paanch Ajoobe
- Chhota Bheem Mission Mangalyaan
- Chhota Bheem And The Sky Dragon
- Chhota Bheem: Kung Fu Dhamaka
- Chhota Chintu Bada Feku
- Chhota Chintu Bada Baazigar
- Mighty Raju vs The Great Pirate
- Mighty Raju and The Magnetors
- Mighty Raju and The Commandos
- Mighty Raju vs Mighty Clone
- Chak De ! Mighty Raju
- Game Over Mighty Raju
- Mighty Raju In School's Cool
- Mighty Raju In Aryanagar Underwater
- Mighty Raju In Battery Low
- Mighty Raju: Aamna Samna
- Mighty Raju: Bachhon Ka Khel
- Mighty Raju: Space Race
- Mighty Raju: Chhutti Ho Gayi
- Mighty Raju: 3 Villains
- Mighty Raju: Superhero School
- Mighty Raju: Hijack
- Mighty Raju: Mighty Khiladi Raju
- Mighty Raju: Time Travel
- Mighty Raju: Ice Ice Mighty
- Mighty Raju aur alien dost
- Krish, Trish and Baltiboy
- Kumbhkaran The Movie
- Sholay Adventures

=== Sony Yay ===
- Honey Bunny In Bank Robbery
- Sab Jholmaal Hai – Honey Bunny Ka Space Adventure
- Honey Bunny Gangs of Film City
- Honey Bunny in Police Petrol
- Paap-O-Meter Under Attack
- Paap-O-Meter Defenders of Earth
- Honey Bunny Save The Panda
- Honey Bunny in The World Tour Challenge
- Tapu and the Big Fat Alien Wedding

=== Zee Kannada ===
- Siddhi Vinayak

== See also ==
- History of animation in India
- History of Disney in India
- Indian animation industry
- List of Indian animated television series
- National Film Award for Best Animated Film
- National Film Award for Best Non-Feature Animation Film
- List of Highest-grossing Indian animated films
