= List of animated feature films of 2023 =

This is a list of animated feature films that were released in 2023.

== List ==
Title	Country	Director	Production company	Animation technique	Notes	Release date	Duration
3 Little Kungpoo Goats	China, Islamic Republic of Iran	Farzad Dalvand; Kianoush Dalvand	Aria Animation Studio; Phoenix Motion Picture Production	Computer		September 10, 2022 (World Festival of Animated Film); April 13, 2023 (Russia); May 24, 2024 (Turkey)	89 minutes
A Kingdom for Us All; Un Reino para Todos Nosotros	Mexico, Colombia	Miguel Ángel Uriegas	Fotosíntesis Media	Traditional		June 2023	86 minutes
Allahyar and the 100 Flowers of God	Pakistan	Uzair Zaheer Khan	3rd World Studios	Computer		June 28, 2023	90 minutes
Amader Choto Russel Shona	Bangladesh	Rubens Rahman; Rubayet Mahmud	Information and Communication Technology Division	Computer		October 18, 2023	26 minutes
Go! Anpanman: Roborii and the Warming Present それいけ!アンパンマン ロボリィとぽかぽかプレゼント	Japan	Toshikazu Hashimoto	Anpanman Production Committee; TMS Entertainment	Traditional		June 30, 2023	64 minutes
Art College 1994	China	Liu Jian	Nezha Bros. Pictures Company Limited; Modern Sky Entertainment Company Limited; China Academy Of Art's School of Animation and Game	Traditional		February 24, 2023 (Berlinale)	118 minutes
Baby Shark's Big Movie!	United States, South Korea	Alan Foreman	Pinkfong; Nickelodeon Animation Studio	Traditional; Flash		December 8, 2023	78 minutes
Babylon 5: The Road Home	United States	Matt Peters	Warner Bros. Animation; Babylonian Productions, Inc. Studio JMS	Computer; Traditional		August 14, 2023 (United Kingdom); August 15, 2023 (United States)	79 minutes
Bamse and the World's Smallest Adventure	Sweden	Christian Ryltenius	Nordisk Film	Traditional		December 22, 2023	65 minutes
Barbie: Skipper and the Big Babysitting Adventure	United States, Canada	Steve Daye	Mainframe Studios; Mattel Television	Computer		March 16, 2023	60 minutes
Batman: The Doom that Came to Gotham	United States	Christopher Berkeley; Sam Liu	Warner Bros. Animation; DC Entertainment	Traditional		March 28, 2023	86 minutes
Berry and Dolly - Tales of Months; Bogyó és Babóca 5 - Hónapok meséi	Hungary	Géza M. Tóth; Kinga Fazakas	Kedd Animation Studio	Flash		April 6, 2023 (Hungary)	70 minutes
Big Bruh	United States	Jerron Horton	Tubi; Fox Entertainment Studios; Bento Box Entertainment	Traditional; Flash		November 12, 2023	67 minutes
Birth of Kitarō: The Mystery of GeGeGe	Japan	Gō Koga	Toei Animation	Traditional		November 17, 2023	104 minutes
Black Clover: Sword of the Wizard King	Japan	Ayataka Tanemura	Pierrot; Netflix	Traditional		June 16, 2023	110 minutes
Blue Giant	Japan	Yuzuru Tachikawa	NUT	Traditional		February 17, 2023	120 minutes
Boonie Bears: Guardian Code	China	Lin Yongchang; Shao Heqi	Fantawild	Computer		January 22, 2023	95 minutes
The Boy and the Heron	Japan	Hayao Miyazaki	Studio Ghibli	Traditional		July 14, 2023	124 minutes
The Brothers Gruff go to Splash world Bukkene Bruse på Badeland	Norway	Will Ashurst	Qvisten Animation	Traditional; Computer		December 25, 2023	70 minutes
Butterfly Tale	Canada, Germany	Sophie Roy	CarpeDiem Film & TV; Ulysses Filmproduktion; Senator Film Köln	Computer		September 16, 2023 (Atlantic International Film Festival); September 29, 2023 (Spain); October 13, 2023 (Canada); February 1, 2024 (Germany)	82 minutes
The Canterville Ghost	United Kingdom, Ireland, India	Kim Burdon; Robert Chandler	Align; Melmoth Films; Space Age Films; Sprout Pictures; Toonz Media Group	Computer		September 22, 2023 (United Kingdom)	89 minutes
Cats in the Museum; Koty Ermitazha	Russia	Vasiliy Rovenskiy	Licensing Brands	Computer		March 23, 2023 (Russia)	83 minutes
Chang'an	China	Xie Junwei; Zou Jing	Light Chaser Animation Studios; Alibaba Pictures; Tianjin Maoyan Weiying Culture Media; Weibo Corporation; China Film Co., Ltd.	Computer		July 2, 2023 (Limited); July 8, 2023 (China)	168 minutes
Cheburashka	Russia	Dmitry Dyachenko	Yellow, Black and White; START Studio; Soyuzmultfilm; Russia-1; CTC Media; Cinema Fund	Compute; Live action		January 1, 2023	113 minutes
Chef Jack: The Adventurous Cook	Brazil	Guilherme Fiúza Zenha	Immagini Animation Studios; Pixel Produções; Ciclus Produções; Solo Filmes	Traditional		January 19, 2023	80 minutes
Chicken for Linda! Linda veut du poulet!	France, Italy	Sébastien Laudenbach; Chiara Malta	Dolce Vita Films; Miyu Productions; Palosanto Films	Traditional		June 12, 2023 (Annecy); October 18, 2023 (France); September 5, 2024 (Italy)	73 minutes
Chicken Run: Dawn of the Nugget	United Kingdom	Sam Fell	Netflix; Aardman Animations	Stop-Motion		October 14, 2023 (BFI); December 15, 2023	98 minutes
City Hunter The Movie: Angel Dust	Japan	Kazuyoshi Takeuchi	Sunrise; The Answer Studio	Traditional		September 8, 2023	94 minutes
Colossus: Child of the Wind	South Korea	Shin Chang-sub	GRIMAE	Traditional		May 18, 2023	93 minutes
The Concierge at Hokkyoku Department Store	Japan	Yoshimi Itazu	Production I.G	Traditional		October 20, 2023	70 minutes
Craig Before the Creek	United States	Matt Burnett; Ben Levin	Cartoon Network Studios	Traditional		December 11, 2023 (Digital); January 13, 2024 (TV)	88 minutes
Cricket & Antoinette; Cvrčak i mravica	Croatia	Luka Rukavina	Diedra; Zagreb Film	Computer		January 5, 2023	82 minutes
Dark Harvest	United States	David Slade	Matt Tolmach Productions	Computer; Live action		October 11, 2023 (Alamo Drafthouse Cinema); October 13, 2023 (Digital)	96 minutes
Deep Sea	China	Tian Xiaopeng	October Media; Coloroom Pictures	Computer		January 22, 2023	112 minutes
Demon Slayer: Kimetsu no Yaiba – To the Swordsmith Village	Japan	Haruo Sotozaki	Ufotable; Toho; Aniplex	Traditional		February 3, 2023	110 minutes
Detective Conan: Black Iron Submarine	Japan	Yuzuru Tachikawa	TMS Entertainment	Traditional		April 14, 2023	109 minutes
Diary of a Wimpy Kid Christmas: Cabin Fever	United States, Canada	Luke Cormican	Walt Disney Pictures; Bardel Entertainment	Computer		December 8, 2023	62 minutes
Didi & Friends The Movie	Malaysia	Akmal Aziz Asmawi; Roshfaizal Ariffin	Astro Shaw; Warnakala Studios; Digital Durian	Computer		February 23, 2023 (Malaysia); April 20, 2023 (Singapore)	104 minutes
Digimon Adventure 02: The Beginning	Japan	Tomohisa Taguchi	Yumeta Company	Traditional		October 5, 2023 (Premiere); October 27, 2023 (Japan)	87 minutes
Distortion	Philippines	Frederick C.G. Borromeo	Studio Moonchalk	Traditional		January 23, 2023	47 minutes
Dogs at the Opera	Russia	Vasiliy Rovenskiy	Nashe Kino	Computer		December 27, 2023	75 minutes
Doraemon: Nobita's Sky Utopia	Japan	Takumi Doyama	Shin-Ei Animation	Traditional		March 3, 2023	107 minutes
Elemental	United States	Peter Sohn	Pixar Animation Studios	Computer		May 27, 2023 (Cannes); June 16, 2023	101 minutes
Emesis Blue	United States	Chad Payne	Fortress Films; Source Filmmaker	Computer		February 20, 2023	108 minutes
Epic Tails; Pattie et la colère de Poséidon	France	David Alaux	TAT Productions; Apollo Films	Computer		January 25, 2023	95 minutes
Eternal Boys Next Stage	Japan	migmi	Liden Films	Traditional		June 9, 2023	69 minutes
Fafner in the Azure: Behind the Line	Japan	Takashi Noto	Production I.G	Traditional		January 20, 2023	54 minutes
Fate/strange Fake: Whispers of Dawn	Japan	Shun Enokido; Takahito Sakazume	A-1 Pictures	Traditional		July 2, 2023	55 minutes
Four Souls of Coyote; Kojot négy lelke	Hungary	Áron Gauder	Cinemon Entertainment	Traditional		March 16, 2023 (Hungary); June 12, 2023 (Annecy)	103 minutes
Gajaman	Sri Lanka	Chanaka Perera	Studio 101	Computer		January 20, 2023	99 minutes
Gekijōban Argonavis Axia	Japan	Shigeru Morikawa	Sanzigen	Traditional		March 24, 2023	64 minutes
GG Bond: Racing 72H	China	Zhong Yu	WinSing Animation	Computer		April 29, 2023	85 minutes
A Giant Adventure	Peru	Eduardo Schuldt	Alligator Entertainment	Computer		January 12, 2023	80 minutes
Girls und Panzer das Finale: Part 4	Japan	Tsutomu Mizushima	Actas	Traditional		October 6, 2023	56 minutes
Glisten and the Merry Mission	United States	Cory Morrison	Big Jump Entertainment; Foundation Media Partners; Build-A-Bear Entertainment	Flash		November 3, 2023	78 minutes
Goldbeak	China	Nigel W. Tierney; Dong Long	Liang Zi Film; Tierney Corp Productions	Computer		March 13, 2023 (Hong Kong International Film Festival)	94 minutes
Gold Kingdom and Water Kingdom	Japan	Kotono Watanabe	Madhouse	Traditional		January 27, 2023	117 minutes
A Greyhound of a Girl	Estonia, Germany, Ireland, Italy, Latvia, Luxembourg, United Kingdom	Enzo D'Alò	Jam Media; Paul Thiltges Distributions; Aliante; Rija Films; Amrion Production; Fish Blowing Bubbles	Traditional		February 18, 2023 (Berlin Film Festival); November 23, 2023 (Italy)	85 minutes
Gridman Universe	Japan	Akira Amemiya	Toho Animation; Studio Trigger	Traditional		March 24, 2023	118 minutes
Heroes of the Golden Masks	Canada	Sean O'Reilly	Arcana Studio; CG Bros Entertainment; Gravitas Ventures	Computer		June 9, 2023	88 minutes
Hidden Dragon	United States; China	Boqing Tang; Xiaolan Zeng	Pantheon Entertainment; Magic Hill Animation Studio	Computer		December 15, 2023	86 minutes
IDOLiSH7 LIVE 4bit BEYOND THE PERiOD	Japan	Hiroshi Nishikiori; Kensuke Yamamoto	Orange	Traditional; Computer		May 20, 2023	93 minutes
The Imaginary	Japan	Yoshiyuki Momose	Studio Ponoc	Traditional		December 15, 2023	105 minutes
The Inseparables	Belgium, France	Jérémie Degruson	nWave Pictures; Octopolis	Computer		June 12, 2023 (Annecy); August 10, 2023 (Belgium); December 13, 2023 (France); August 30, 2024 (Spain)	90 minutes
The Inventor	France, Ireland, United States, Luxembourg	Jim Capobianco	Curiosity Studio; Foliascope; Leo & King; Melusine Productions	Stop-Motion; Traditional; Computer		June 12, 2023 (Annecy); September 15, 2023 (United States); January 31, 2024 (France)	92 minutes
Johnny & Me; Johnny & Me - eine Zeitreise mit John Heartfield	Austria, Switzerland, German	Katrin Rothe	Dschoint Ventschr Filmproduktion AG; Hanfgarn & Ufer Film und TV Produktion; Mischief Films	Stop motion Live action		June 12, 2023 (Annecy); January 25, 2024 (Germany)	104 minutes
The Jungle Bunch 2: World Tour; Les As de la Jungle 2: Opération tour du monde	France	Benoît Somville	TAT Productions; SND Groupe M6	Computer		August 16, 2023; February 2, 2024 (United States)	88 minutes
Justice League: Warworld	United States	Jeff Wamester	Warner Bros. Animation; DC Entertainment	Traditional		July 25, 2023	89 minutes
Justice League X RWBY: Super Heroes and Huntsmen: Part One	United States	Kerry Shawcross	Warner Bros. Animation; DC Entertainment; Rooster Teeth Animation	Computer; Traditional		April 25, 2023	80 minutes
Justice League X RWBY: Super Heroes and Huntsmen: Part Two	United States	Dustin Mattews; Yssa Badiola	Warner Bros. Animation; DC Entertainment; Rooster Teeth Animation	Computer; Traditional		October 31, 2023	91 minutes
Katak: The Brave Beluga	Canada	Christine Dallaire-Dupont; Nicola Lemay	10th Ave. Productions	Computer		February 24, 2023	82 minutes
Kensuke's Kingdom; Le royaume de Kensuké	United Kingdom, Luxembourg, France	Neil Boyle; Kirk Hendry	British Film Institute; Ffilm Cymru Wales; Film Fund Luxembourg	Traditional		June 11, 2023 (Annecy); October 14, 2023 (BFI London Film Festival); February 7, 2024 (France)	85 minutes
Komada: A Whisky Family	Japan	Masayuki Yoshihara	P.A. Works	Traditional		June 15, 2023 (Annecy); November 10, 2023 (Japan)	91 minutes
Kundan Satti	India	P. K. Aghasthi	Shellammal Movie Makers	Computer		October 13, 2023	106 minutes
La leyenda de los Chaneques	Mexico	Marvick Núñez	Ánima	Flash		July 14, 2023	89 minutes
Ladybug & Cat Noir: The Movie	France	Jeremy Zag	Netflix; Zagtoon; Method Animation; The Awakening Production; SND; Cross Creek Pictures; Fantawild	Computer		June 11, 2023 (Grand Rex); July 5, 2023 (France); July 28, 2023 (Netflix)	105 minutes
Legion of Super-Heroes	United States	Jeff Wamester	Warner Bros. Animation; DC Entertainment	Traditional		February 7, 2023	83 minutes
Leo	United States, Australia	Robert Marianetti; David Wachtenheim; Robert Smigel	Netflix Animation Studios; Happy Madison Productions	Computer		November 21, 2023	102 minutes
The Little Mermaid	United States	Michael Johnson	The Asylum	Computer		June 6, 2023	90 minutes
Maboroshi	Japan	Mari Okada	MAPPA	Traditional		September 15, 2023	111 minutes
The Magician's Elephant	United States	Wendy Rogers	Netflix Animation Studios; Pistor Productions	Computer		March 17, 2023	100 minutes
Mars Express	France	Jérémie Périn	Everybody On the Deck; Je Suis Bien Content; Ev.L Prod; Plume Finance; France 3 Cinéma; Shine Conseils; Gébéka Films; Amopix	Traditional; Computer		May 21, 2023 (Cannes); June 12, 2023 (Annecy); November 22, 2023 (France)	85 minutes
Mavka: The Forest Song	Ukraine	Oleg Malamuzh; Oleksandra Ruban	Animagrad; FILM.UA Group	Computer		March 2, 2023 (Ukraine)	90 minutes
Merry Little Batman	United States	Mike Roth	Warner Bros. Animation; DC Entertainment	Traditional		December 8, 2023	96 minutes
Metalocalypse: Army of the Doomstar	United States	Brendon Small	Williams Street; Titmouse, Inc.	Traditional; Flash		August 22, 2023	83 minutes
Mickey and Friends Trick or Treats	United States	David H. Brooks	Stoopid Buddy Stoodios; Disney Television Animation	Stop Motion		October 1, 2023	30 minutes
Migration	United States	Benjamin Renner	Illumination	Computer		October 19, 2023 (VIEW Conference); December 22, 2023	83 minutes
Millennial Hunter	United States	Sam Taggart	Tubi; Fox Entertainment Studios; Bento Box Entertainment	Traditional; Flash		August 14, 2023	70 minutes
The Missing	Philippines, Thailand	Carl Joseph Papa	Project 8 Projects; GMA News and Public Affairs; Terminal Six Post; Purin Pictures	Traditional; Rotoscope		August 5, 2023 (Cinemalaya); January 7, 2024 (Palm Springs)	90 minutes
Mikolo	Nigeria	Niyi Akinmolayan	Anthill Studios; Film One Entertainment; Amazon Prime	Computer; Live action		August 18, 2023	110 minutes
The Monkey King	United States, China, Hong Kong	Anthony Stacchi	Netflix Animation Studios; Pearl Studio	Computer		July 30, 2023 (NYAFF); August 18, 2023	96 minutes
Mortal Kombat Legends: Cage Match	United States	Ethan Spaulding	Warner Bros. Animation	Traditional		October 17, 2023	76 minutes
Mujib Bhai	Bangladesh	Chandan K Barman; Sohel Mohammad Rana	Technomagic Private Ltd; Hypertag Ltd	Computer; Traditional		June 23, 2023	47 minutes
Mummies	Spain	Juan Jesús García Galocha	Atresmedia Cine; 4 Cats Pictures; Anangu Grup; Moomios Movie AIE	Computer		January 5, 2023 (Australia); February 24, 2023 (Spain)	88 minutes
My Next Life as a Villainess: All Routes Lead to Doom! The Movie	Japan	Keisuke Inoue	Silver Link	Traditional		November 19, 2023 (New York City); December 8, 2023 (Japan)	90 minutes
A Mystery on the Cattle Hill Express	Norway	Will Ashurst	Felleskjø; Kristiansand Dyrepark; Qvisten Animation	Computer		March 3, 2023	70 minutes
New Dimension! Crayon Shin-chan the Movie: Battle of Supernatural Powers ~Flying Sushi~	Japan	Hitoshi Ône	ADK; Futabasha; Shin Ei Animation; Shirogumi; TV Asahi Productions	Computer		August 4, 2023	93 minutes
Nimona	United States	Nick Bruno; Troy Quane	Netflix; Annapurna Animation	Computer		June 14, 2023 (Annecy); June 30, 2023	99 minutes
Nina and the Hedgehog's Secret	France, Luxembourg	Jean-Loup Felicioli; Alain Gagnol	Auvergne Rhône-Alpes Cinéma; Doghouse Films; Folimage; KMBO Production; Parmi Les Lucioles Films; Philophon	Traditional		June 12, 2023 (Annecy); August 4, 2023 (Locarno Film Festival); October 11, 2023 (France)	82 minutes
Oh My School!	China	Mingze Xia; Kai Yan	Beijing Enlight Pictures	Computer		July 14, 2023	91 minutes
Ozi: Voice of the Forest	United Kingdom, France	Tim Harper	Appian Way; GCI Film; Mike Medavoy Productions; GFM Animation	Computer		June 13, 2023 (Annecy); August 16, 2024 (United Kingdom)	87 minutes
Pastacolypse	United States	Jason Shwartz	Tubi; Fox Entertainment Studios; Bento Box Entertainment	Traditional; Flash		May 21, 2023	70 minutes
Paw Patrol: The Mighty Movie	Canada	Cal Brunker	Nickelodeon Movies; Spin Master Entertainment	Computer		September 29, 2023	87 minutes
The Peasants	Poland, Serbia, Lithuania	DK Welchman; Hugh Welchman	BreakThru Films; DigitalKraft; Art Shot	Oil-painted; Traditional		September 13, 2023 (TIFF); October 13, 2023 (Poland); January 26, 2024 (United States)	115 minutes
Pelikan Blue; Kék Pelikan	Hungary	László Csáki	Cinemon Entertainment; Umbrella	Traditional		November 11, 2023 (Tallinn); April 4, 2024	84 minutes
Phoenix: Reminiscence of Flower	Japan	Shōjirō Nishimi	Studio 4°C	Traditional		November 3, 2023	95 minutes
Pinkfong & Hogi Mini-Movie: The Tricky Three Cars	South Korea, United States		The Pinkfong Company	Computer			
Pinkfong Sing-Along Movie 3: Catch the Gingerbread Man	South Korea, United States	Sukyoung Kim	The Pinkfong Company	Computer		July 26, 2023 (South Korea); September 9, 2023 (United States)	66 minutes
Pole Princess!!	Japan	Hitomi Ezoe; Yoshihiro Otobe (CG)	Tatsunoko Production	Traditional; Computer		November 23, 2023	75 minutes
Poop, Spring and the Others'; Kaka, kevad ja teised	Estonia	Meelis Arulepp; Heiki Ernits; Oskar Lehemaa; Mikk Mägi; René Vilbre	A. Film Production	Traditional; Flash; Stop Motion; Computer; Live action		February 10, 2023	71 minutes
Pretty Cure All Stars F	Japan	Yūta Tanaka	Toei Animation	Traditional		September 15, 2023	73 minutes
Pretty Guardian Sailor Moon Cosmos The Movie	Japan	Tomoya Takahashi	Toei Animation; Studio Deen	Traditional		Part 1: June 9, 2023; Part 2: June 30, 2023	160 minutes (total, 80 minutes per film)
Princess Principal: Crown Handler – Chapter 3	Japan	Masaki Tachibana	Actas	Traditional		April 7, 2023	60 minutes
Psycho-Pass Providence	Japan	Naoyoshi Shiotani	Production I.G	Traditional		May 12, 2023	120 minutes
Puffin Rock and the New Friends	United Kingdom, Ireland	Jeremy Purcell; Lorraine Lordan	Cartoon Saloon; Dog Ears; WestEnd Films	Flash		July 14, 2023 (Ireland); August 11, 2023 (United Kingdom)	80 minutes
Rakudai Majo: Fūka to Yami no Majo	Japan	Takayuki Hamana	Production I.G	Traditional		March 31, 2023	59 minutes
Rally Road Racers	United Kingdom, United States, United Arab Emirates	Ross Venokur	Vanguard Animation; Virtuso Productions; Riverstone Pictures; LipSync; Kintop Pictures; REP Productions 6 Ltd.	Computer		May 12, 2023 (United States); September 15, 2023 (United Kingdom)	93 minutes
Rascal Does Not Dream of a Knapsack Kid	Japan	Sōichi Masui	CloverWorks	Traditional		December 1, 2023	75 minutes
Rascal Does Not Dream of a Sister Venturing Out	Japan	Sōichi Masui	CloverWorks	Traditional		June 23, 2023	73 minutes
Ready Jet Go!: Space Camp	United States	Mucci Fassett	Silver Creek Falls Entertainment; Universal Pictures Home Entertainment	Computer		July 20, 2023	85 minutes
Resident Evil: Death Island	Japan	Eiichirō Hasumi	TMS Entertainment; Quebico	Computer		June 22, 2023 (Singapore); July 7, 2023 (Japan); July 25, 2023 (Blu-ray & Digital)	91 minutes
Richard the Stork and the Mystery of the Great Jewel	Germany, Belgium, Norway	Benjamin Quabeck; Mette Tange	Den Siste Skilling; Knudsen & Streuber Medienmanufaktur; Walking The Dog	Computer		March 23, 2023 (Germany); April 12, 2023 (Norway)	84 minutes
Robot Dreams	Spain, France	Pablo Berger	Arcadia Motion Pictures; Noodles Production; Les Films du Worso; RTVE; Movistar Plus+	Traditional Toon Boom Harmony		May 21, 2023 (Cannes); June 12, 2023 (Annecy); December 6, 2023 (Spain); December 27, 2023 (France)	102 minutes
Rock Dog 3: Battle the Beat	United States, China	Anthony Bell	Lionsgate; Splash Entertainment; HB Wink Animation	Computer		January 24, 2023	90 minutes
Rocket Saves the Day	United States	Amanda Strong	Atomic Cartoons	Flash		December 26, 2023	45 minutes
Rosa and the Stone Troll; Roselil og stentrolden	Denmark	Karla Nor Holmbäck	A. Film Production; Dansk Tegnefilm; Nordisk Film & TV-Fond; The Danish Film Institute Archive	Flash		February 9, 2023	75 minutes
Ruby Gillman, Teenage Kraken	United States	Kirk DeMicco	DreamWorks Animation	Computer		June 15, 2023 (Annecy); June 30, 2023	91 minutes
Ruslan and Ludmila. More than a Fairy Tale	Russia	Alexey Zamyslov; Vladimir Nikolaev; Alexey Tsitsylin	Voronezh Animation Studio; CTB Film Company	Computer		August 24, 2023	95 minutes
Sand Land	Japan	Toshihisa Yokoshima	Sunrise; Anima; Kamikaze Douga	Traditional		August 18, 2023	106 minutes
Sasaki and Miyano: Graduation	Japan	Shinji Ishihira	Studio Deen	Traditional		February 17, 2023	59 minutes
Scarygirl	Australia	Ricard Cussó; Tania Vincent	Highly Spirited; Passion Pictures Australia; Particular Crowd; Like A Photon Creative	Computer		June 17, 2023 (Sydney Film Festival); October 26, 2023	90 minutes
Scooby-Doo! and Krypto, Too!	United States	Cecilia Aranovich Hamilton	Warner Bros. Animation; DC Entertainment	Traditional		September 26, 2023	76 minutes
The Seven Deadly Sins: Grudge of Edinburgh Part 2	Japan	Noriyuki Abe (Note: Credited as Chief Director (総監督, Sō Kantoku)); Bob Shirahata	Alfred Imageworks; Marvy Jack	Traditional		August 8, 2023	54 minutes
The Siren; La Sirène	France, Germany, Luxembourg, Belgium	Sepideh Farsi	Les Films d'Ici; Katuh Studio; Bac Cinéma; Lunanime; TrickStudio Lutterbeck	Computer		February 16, 2023 (Berlin); June 28, 2023 (France)	100 minutes
Sirocco and the Kingdom of Winds; Sirocco et le royaume des courants d'air	Belgium, France	Benoît Chieux	Sacrebleu Productions; Take Five; Ciel de Paris Production	Traditional		June 11, 2023 (Annecy); December 13, 2023 (France & Belgium)	74 minutes
The Snow Queen and the Princess	Russia	Aleksey Tsitsilin; Andrey Korenkov	Wizart Animation	Computer		February 16, 2023	80 minutes
Spider-Man: Across the Spider-Verse	United States	Joaquim Dos Santos; Kemp Powers; Justin K. Thompson	Sony Pictures Animation; Marvel Entertainment; Pascal Pictures; Lord Miller Productions; Arad Productions	Computer; Traditional		May 30, 2023 (Regency Village Theater); June 2, 2023	140 minutes
Spy × Family Code: White	Japan	Takashi Katagiri	Wit Studio; CloverWorks	Traditional		December 22, 2023	110 minutes
Strays	United States	Josh Greenbaum	Picturestart; Rabbit Hole Productions; Lord Miller Productions	Computer; Live action		August 18, 2023	93 minutes
Sultana's Dream	Spain, Germany	Isabel Herguera	Sultana Films; Gatoverde Producciones; Abano Producións; Uniko Estudio Creativo; Fabian & Fred	Oil-painted; Traditional		September 24, 2023 (San Sebastián); November 17, 2023 (Spain)	86 minutes
The Super Mario Bros. Movie	United States, Japan	Aaron Horvath; Michael Jelenic	Illumination; Nintendo	Computer		April 1, 2023 (Regal LA Live); April 5, 2023	92 minutes
The Swan Princess: A Fairytale is Born	United States	Richard Rich	Sony Pictures Home Entertainment; Crest Animation Productions	Computer		May 23, 2023	86 minutes
The Swan Princess: Far Longer than Forever	United States	Richard Rich	Sony Pictures Home Entertainment; Crest Animation Productions	Computer		September 19, 2023 (Digital); October 24, 2023 (DVD)	86 minutes
Taz: Quest for Burger	United States	Ryan Kramer	Warner Bros. Animation	Flash		June 6, 2023 (Digital); June 20, 2023 (DVD)	75 minutes
Teenage Mutant Ninja Turtles: Mutant Mayhem	United States	Jeff Rowe	Nickelodeon Movies; Point Grey Pictures	Computer; Traditional		June 12, 2023 (Annecy); August 2, 2023	99 minutes
They Shot the Piano Player	Spain, France, Netherlands	Fernando Trueba; Javier Mariscal	Fernando Trueba PC; Les Films D’ici; Submarine Animanostra	Traditional		September 6, 2023 (Telluride); October 6, 2023 (Spain)	103 minutes
Toopy and Binoo: The Movie	Canada	Dominique Jolin; Reymond Lebrun	Corus Entertainment; Echo Media	Flash		August 11, 2023	80 minutes
Tony, Shelly and the Magic Light	Czech Republic, Hungary, Slovakia	Filip Posivac	Nutprodukce; Nutprodukcia; Czech Television; Radio and Television of Slovakia; Kouzelná animace Filmfabriq	Stop Motion		June 1, 2023 (Zlín Festival); June 13, 2023 (Annecy); November 2, 2023 (Czech Republic); November 9, 2023 (Slovakia); November 21, 2023 (Hungary)	82 minutes
Totto-Chan: The Little Girl at the Window	Japan	Shinnosuke Yakuwa	Shin-Ei Animation	Traditional		December 8, 2023	114 minutes
Transformers: Rise of the Beasts	United States	Steven Caple Jr.	Paramount Pictures; Skydance; Hasbro; New Republic Pictures; Di Bonaventura Pictures; Bayhem Films	Computer / Live action		May 27, 2023 (Marina Bay Sands); June 9, 2023	127 minutes
Trolls Band Together	United States	Walt Dohrn	DreamWorks Animation	Computer		November 12, 2023 (Los Angeles); November 17, 2023	92 minutes
Under the Boardwalk	United States	David Soren	Paramount Animation; Big Kid Pictures	Computer		October 27, 2023	83 minutes
Urkel Saves Santa: The Movie!	United States	Jojo Ramos Patrick; Bryan Newton; Richard Pose	Warner Bros. Animation	Traditional; Flash		November 21, 2023	86 minutes
The Venture Bros.: Radiant Is the Blood of the Baboon Heart	United States	Jackson Publick	Williams Street; Astro-Base GO! Titmouse, Inc.	Traditional		July 21, 2023 (Digital); July 25, 2023 (Blu-ray)	84 minutes
When Adam Changes	Canada	Joël Vaudreuil	Parce Que Films	Traditional		June 12, 2023 (Annecy)	96 minutes
Who are you, Mamma Moo?	Sweden	Christian Ryltenius	SF Studios	Traditional; Flash		August 25, 2023	66 minutes
White Plastic Sky; Műanyag égbolt	Hungary, Slovakia	Tibor Bánóczki; Sarolta Szabó	Salto Film; Artichoke	Rotoscope; Traditional; Computer		February 17, 2023 (Berlin); March 30, 2023 (Hungary)	111 minutes
Wish	United States	Chris Buck; Fawn Veerasunthorn	Walt Disney Animation Studios	Traditional; Computer		November 18, 2023 (El Capitan Theatre); November 23, 2023	92 minutes
Yaga and the Book of Spells	Russia	Vladimir Sakov	Art Pictures Studio; Gluk'oza Animation	Computer		April 22, 2023 (Moscow Film Festival); April 27, 2023	101 minutes

== Highest-grossing animated films ==
The following is a list of the 10 highest-grossing animated feature films first released in 2023.

Rank	Title	Distributor	Worldwide gross	Ref
1	The Super Mario Bros. Movie	Universal Pictures	$1,363,377,030	
2	Spider-Man: Across the Spider-Verse	Sony Pictures Releasing	$690,897,910	
3	Elemental	Walt Disney Studios Motion Pictures	$496,444,308	
4	The Boy and the Heron	Toho	$304,800,000	
5	Migration	Universal Pictures	$300,256,116	
6	Wish	Walt Disney Studios Motion Pictures	$254,876,117	
7	Spy × Family Code: White	Toho	$246,392,839	
8	Chang'an	Tianjin Maoyan Weiying Culture Media	$241,270,000	
9	Boonie Bears: Guardian Code	Fantawild	$221,982,308	
10	Trolls Band Together	Universal Pictures	$210,081,137	

=== Box office records ===
- 2023 is the first year since 2019 to have an animated film gross over $1 billion.
- The Super Mario Bros. Movie became the first film based on a video game, and the 52nd film overall, to gross $1 billion worldwide. It set a number of other box office records:
  - The film surpassed 2019's Frozen II as having the highest-grossing opening worldwide for an animated film, grossing $375.6 million.
  - It achieved the highest-grossing opening for a video game adaptation worldwide, surpassing 2019's Detective Pikachu.
  - The film achieved the second highest-grossing opening weekend in the US and Canada for an animated film behind Incredibles 2, earning $146 million in a 3-day frame and $204 million in a 5-day frame over Easter weekend.
  - It set the record for the biggest five-day opening weekend (for films opening on Wednesday) in North America, surpassing Transformers: Revenge of the Fallen (2009).
  - It set the record for Illumination's biggest opening, surpassing Despicable Me 2 (2013).
  - It became the highest-grossing video game film of all time, surpassing Warcraft (2016) in nine days by April 13.
  - It became the highest-grossing animated film since the COVID-19 pandemic began in 2019, surpassing Minions: The Rise of Gru (2022).
  - In Japan, its opening weekend gross of $14.3 million is the highest for a Hollywood animated film, and the highest for a Universal release (surpassing 2022's Jurassic World Dominion).
- The anime films Suzume and The First Slam Dunk set several box office records upon their international debut in 2023.
  - In South Korea, The First Slam Dunk became the highest-grossing anime film, before its record was surpassed by Suzume.
  - In China, Suzume became the highest-grossing anime film. It also set the record for the biggest opening for an anime film in China, before its record was surpassed by The First Slam Dunk.
  - The First Slam Dunk also set Chinese box office records for the highest pre-sales for an animated import, and the largest IMAX opening weekend for a foreign animated film.
- Elemental set the record as the best highest-grossing for an animated film distributor by Disney with a gross of $496.4 million worldwide released during the COVID-19 pandemic, surpassing the 2021 film Encanto.
- The Spider-Man franchise became the third film franchise to gross $10 billion with the release of Across the Spider-Verse.
  - With a $120.5 million opening weekend in the United States, it is the third most successful opening weekend for any Spider-Man and Sony film, behind Spider-Man: No Way Home (2021) and Spider-Man 3 (2007).
  - It became the highest grossing animated film distributed by Sony Pictures surpassing Hotel Transylvania 3: Summer Vacation.
  - Across the Spider-Verse also became Sony Pictures Animation's highest-grossing film, surpassing The Smurfs (2011).
- Teenage Mutant Ninja Turtles: Mutant Mayhem set the record as the highest-grossing for an animated film distributor by Paramount Pictures and Nickelodeon Movies domestically with a gross of $152.9 million worldwide, surpassing the 2004 film The SpongeBob SquarePants Movie.

== See also ==
- List of animated television series of 2023
