= Super K =

Super-K is the Super-Kamiokande neutrino observatory located under Mount Kamioka, Japan.

Super K or Super-K may also refer to:

- Super K Productions, a 1960s American recording production company
- Super K – The Movie, a 2011 Indian animated film
- Superdollar, known as "Super K" in Japan
- Roger Clemens, a professional baseball player referred to by that nickname on the 1987 Fleer baseball card "Dr. K and Super K."

== See also ==
- K Supercomputer, Japanese supercomputer
