= Inimey Nangathan =

- Poster
- Directed by: Venkybaboo
- Written by: Venkybaboo
- Produced by: S.Sridevi
- Starring: M. S. Bhaskar; Pandu; Vasu Vikram; Maaran
- Edited by: B. Lenin; Venkybaboo
- Music by: Illayaraja
- Production company: Mayabimbham Media P Ltd
- Distributed by: Mayabimbham Media P Ltd
- Release date: 14 September 2007
- Running time: 90 minutes
- Country: India
- Language: Tamil

Inimey Nangathan (transl. Hereafter it's us) is a 2007 Indian Tamil-language animated fantasy film written and directed by Venkybaboo. It is the first Tamil film to be animated. The film features the voices of M. S. Bhaskar, Pandu, Vasu Vikram, and Maaran. The music was composed by Illayaraja. The film was released on 14 September 2007 but went unnoticed due to the lack of big stars. The film won the National Film Award for Best Animated Film.

== Plot ==
Vichu, Varadhu, Vaithi, and Govind are four friends who earn their livelihood doing kathakalakshepam. They want to become rich and famous. They come across an old lady who offers to help them become rich overnight and then advises them to meet a swamiji. The swamiji agrees to help them, but on one condition: they should retrieve a holy necklace from rakshasas.

The four friends set out to the cave, where they meet a colorful sea character in a golden palace. They reach a flowing desert, where Govind pushes them into a pit, and then a very tall mountain rises. This is the end of Govind.

The others reach a stone hill. Varadhu wants to kill them, so he pushes a big stone onto them. Varadhu eats a fruit given to him by the Swamiji. Since he ate the full fruit, he became very fat, and his face got stuck in a doorway. This is the end of Varadhu.

Vaithi does not listen to Vichu and says that all the diamonds belong to him. He pushes Vichu into a valley. The diamonds become weapons, touching Vaithi, and his body disappears. If he goes out of the cave, he blends into the air. This is the end of Vaithi.

Vichu falls into the valley. He finds the holy necklace, but a rakshasa guards it. Vichu fights with the rakshas and takes the necklace.

Later, Vichu gives the necklace to the Swamiji. In exchange for the holy necklace, the Swamiji gives Vichu the golden palace, but Vichu refuses, saying that he has gotten what he wanted in his journey, and goes back to his village. The Swamiji tells him telepathically that he will come back, so he will wait for him. The film ends with a golden cow following Vichu.

== Voice cast ==
- M. S. Bhaskar as Vishwanathan a.k.a. Vichu
- Pandu as Varadarajan a.k.a. Varadhu
- Vasu Vikram as Vaidyanathan a.k.a. Vaithi
- Maaran as Venkata Govindarajan a.k.a. Govind
- Murali Kumar as Priest

== Music ==
Songs were composed by Ilaiyaraaja

All tracks are written by Vaali.

Tamil Tracklist
No.	Title	Singer(s)	Length
1.	"Oru Murai Kettalae"	Madhu Balakrishnan & Chorus	05:40
2.	"Vaazhu Vendumaa"	Madhu Balakrishnan, Sriram Parthasarathy & Chorus	04:59
3.	"Unnai Kezh"	Ilaiyaraaja	04:23
4.	"Katha Kaletshepam"	Madhu Balakrishnan & Chorus	02:56

All tracks are written by Nawab Arzoo.

Hindi Tracklist
No.	Title	Singer(s)	Length
1.	"Geet Humare Suno"	Krishna & Chorus	05:40
2.	"Zindagi Kahe Aaja"	Krishna & Chorus	04:59
3.	"Apne Aap Se"	Krishna & Chorus	04:23
4.	"Janani Janani"	Krishna & Chorus	02:56

All tracks are written by Vennelakanti.

Telugu Tracklist
No.	Title	Singer(s)	Length
1.	"Okapari Vinntene"	Karthik	05:40
2.	"Manadhe Vijayam"	Karthik	04:59
3.	"Thalluchuko"	Karthik	04:23
4.	"Katha Kaletshepam"	Karthik	02:56

== Reception ==
Divya Kumar of The Hindu wrote, "Overall, however, this ambitious movie is a step in the right direction. With some interesting touches like the characters turning into a rock band briefly, and an imaginative non-mythological plotline, it tries to do a few different things and while it isn’t perfect, it succeeds in taking animation a step further in India". Rediff wrote, "If you can ignore the sometimes inadequate dialogue and trite screenplay, it's a squeaky clean, promising fare. For all its predictability, you can see enough creativity and colourful settings to watch out the movie right till the end". Malini Mannath of Chennai Online wrote, "With its crisp editing (Lenin) and engaging background score (Ilayaraja) aiding it, it is worth appreciating the experiment in 3D animation that maintains the nativity and local flavour".

== See also ==
- Indian animation industry
- List of Indian animated films
