= Gitanjali Rao =

Indian theatre actress, animator

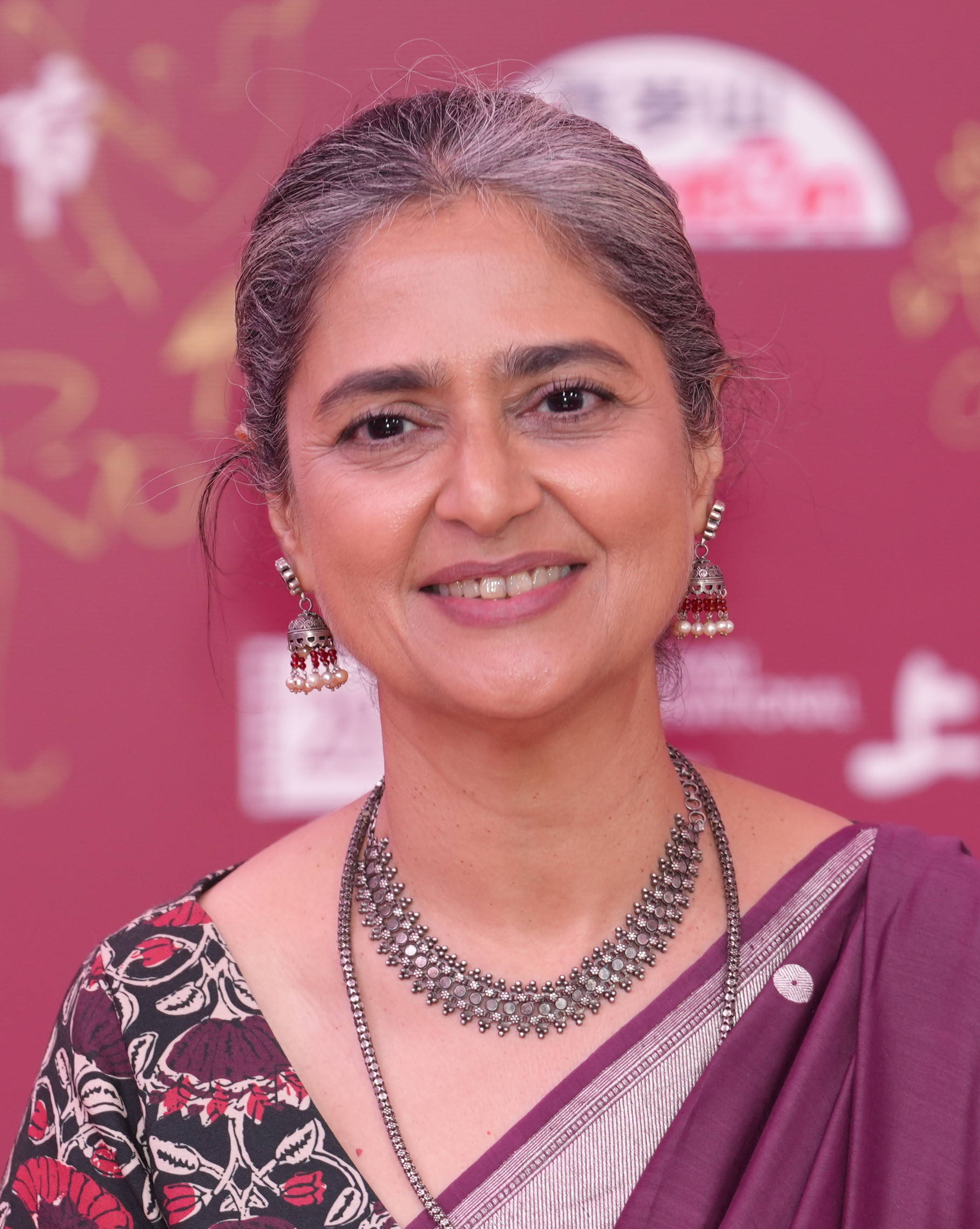
- Rao at 2026 Shanghai International Film Festival
- Born: 1972 (age 53–54); Mumbai, India
- Occupations: Film director, animator, actor
- Known for: Printed Rainbow; True Love Story; October

Gitanjali Rao (born 1972) is an Indian theatre actress, animator and film maker.

== Biography and career ==
Gitanjali graduated as an applied artist from Sir. J. J. Institute of Applied Art, Mumbai, in 1994. Two animated short films independently produced and directed by her, Orange and 'Printed Rainbow'. Her debut animation short Printed Rainbow (2006) had won the Kodak Short Film Award, Small Golden Rail and the Young Critics Award at Critics Week section at Cannes in 2006. The film has also won the Golden Conch for Best Animation Film in the 2006 Mumbai International Film Festival.

She has served in the judge's panel at various festivals including the 2011 Cannes Critic's Week short films jury. In 2013, she directed a segment in Shorts, a compilation of five short films, along with Neeraj Ghaywan, Vasan Bala, Anubhuti Kashyap and Shlok Sharma, and produced by Anurag Kashyap.

At the 2014 Cannes Film Festival, her animated short, True Love Story was one of 10 selected short films at Critics' Week.

In 2018, she made her Hindi film debut alongside Varun Dhawan and debutante Banita Sandhu in the coming-of-age drama October directed by Shoojit Sircar. The film, and her performance as Prof. Vidya Iyer, a professor at IIT Delhi and the mother of Sandhu's character, received widespread critical acclaim, and earned her a nomination for the Filmfare Award for Best Supporting Actress.

Her latest animated feature Bombay Rose (2019) was one of the International Critics Choice screenings at Poff film festival in Tallinn and was also screened at the Venice International Film Critics Week 2019.

== Filmography ==
- Printed Rainbow (2006) — Director, producer and animator.
- Shorts (2013)
- Chai (2013)
- True Love Story (2014)
- October (2018) — Debut as a film actor.
- Bombay Rose (2019)

== Accolades ==
- Kodak Short Film Award
- Small Golden Rail
- Young Critics Award
- 2019 — Filmfare Award for Best Supporting Actress: October (nominated)

=== Locarno Film Festival ===
- 2022 — Locarno Kids Award at 75th Locarno Film Festival on August 8 at Locarno’s Piazza Grande accompanied by screening of her animated short film Printed Rainbow.

=== As jury ===
- 2022 — She was selected as jury member in Filmmakers of the present competition category at 75th Locarno Film Festival.
