= Kittu =

- Directed by: B. Satya
- Written by: Hota Agni Kumar; B. Satya
- Produced by: Bhargava Kodavanti
- Edited by: A. Sreekar Prasad
- Production company: Bhargava Pictures
- Release date: 21 July 2006
- Running time: 120 minutes
- Country: India
- Language: Telugu
- Budget: ₹3 crore

Kittu is a 2006 traditionally animated Indian feature film. It is the first animated film to be made in the Telugu language. It won the National Film Award and is also credited with the Nandi Award for second best children's film 2006.

== Plot ==
The film follows a monkey named Kittu as he banished from the jungle and heads for the city.

== Voice cast ==
- Trisha as Kittu
- Sri Devi as Kittu's mother
- Murali as Kittu's father
- Janardhan as King
- R.C.M. Raju as S. I., Elephant, Pig (Head Constable), and Moneywala
- Bhargavi as Mother Bird, Mother Elephant, Baby Deer, and Parrot
- Achyut as Fox (Constable)
- Deepa as Snake
- Tara as Teacher
- Aditya as Principal and Pig
- Teja as Mule
- Tejonivas as Baby Fox and Kittu's friend (Monkey)
- Damodhar Reddy as PT
- Lokesh as Kittu's friend (Monkey)

Source.

== Production ==
It took 18 months for a team of 120 animators to complete the film.

== Awards ==
Year	Name of Competition	Category	Result	Recipient	Ref.
2008	Nandi Awards 2006	Second Best Children's Film	Won	Kittu	
2008	54th National Film Awards	Best Animated Film	Won	Bhargava Kodavanti; B. Sathya	

== See also ==
- Cinema of Andhra Pradesh
- List of Indian animated feature films
