= October (2018 film) =

2018 Indian film by Shoojit Sircar

- Theatrical release poster
- Directed by: Shoojit Sircar
- Written by: Juhi Chaturvedi
- Produced by: Ronnie Lahiri; Sheel Kumar
- Starring: Banita Sandhu; Gitanjali Rao; Varun Dhawan
- Cinematography: Avik Mukhopadhyay
- Edited by: Chandrashekhar Prajapati
- Music by: Songs: Shantanu Moitra; Abhishek Arora; Anupam Roy; Background Score: Shantanu Moitra
- Production companies: Rising Sun Films; Kino Works
- Distributed by: NH Studioz; Grand Showbiz (International)
- Release date: 13 April 2018
- Running time: 115 minutes
- Country: India
- Language: Hindi
- Budget: ₹33 crore
- Box office: ₹58.41 crore

October is a 2018 Indian Hindi-language drama film directed by Shoojit Sircar, and produced by Ronnie Lahiri and Sheel Kumar under their Rising Sun Films banner. The film stars Banita Sandhu, Gitanjali Rao, and Varun Dhawan. Both Sandhu and Rao debuted as actors with this film. Written by Juhi Chaturvedi and shot by Avik Mukhopadhyay, the film follows the life of a hotel-management intern who takes care of his comatose fellow intern in an unconditional and unconventional manner.

Initially scheduled to release on 1 June 2018, the film was released on 13 April 2018, grossing over ₹ 584.1 million worldwide. Upon its release, the filmmakers were accused of plagiarising Aarti – The Unknown Love Story, a Marathi film directed by Sarika Mene. Screenwriters Association reviewed the case and found some similarities between the two films. However, it cleared October of plagiarism charges as the real-life events that likely inspired both the films were not protected by copyright laws.

October received widespread critical acclaim, with particular praise for Dhawan, whose performance was called 'a massive surprise' by critics in light of the criticism he faced for Judwaa 2. Rao and Sandhu also received praise for their performances. Despite such acclaim, it was only a modest commercial success. It received seven nominations at the 64th Filmfare Awards including Best Actor (Critics) for Dhawan, Best Supporting Actress for Rao and Best Female Debut for Sandhu.

== Plot ==
Shiuli Iyer and Danish "Dan" Walia work as interns at the Radisson Blu hotel in New Delhi. Shiuli, being very disciplined and responsible towards her job, is the polar opposite of Dan who is careless and irresponsible towards his job. At the beginning of the story, Dan struggles with his job serving various departments of the hotel. He doesn't seem to have a very good relationship with his fellow staff members except for two of his friends who work at the same hotel as interns.

On New Year's Eve, Shiuli and her friends party on the 3rd floor of the hotel, when Dan is nowhere to be found. Shiuli accidentally falls off the terrace and is hospitalized, going into coma. While other members of the hotel staff visit her at the hospital, Dan gets seriously affected when his friends tell him that Shiuli's last words just before her fall were "Where is Dan?". Dan starts visiting the hospital every day, despite that negatively affecting both his job and his relationship with his friends who still cover his shifts and help him financially. After a scuffle at the hotel, Dan is terminated. He finds comfort being with Shiuli who slowly starts to improve and Dan's mere presence calms Shiuli. He devotes his entire time to taking care of her.

Seeing Dan's career and personal life drowning due to his devotion towards Shiuli, her mother Vidya decides to make him go and take care of himself. Dan joins another hotel in Kullu as manager but is unable to take his mind off Shiuli. Soon he learns of Shiuli's failing health in Delhi and returns. He apologises for leaving her abruptly and promises to stay with her. Seeing Dan, Shiuli calms and begins to improve again. She is soon discharged from the hospital and is brought home where Dan continues taking care of her. He takes her to a park and asks her why she remembered him before her fall. Shiuli responds by trying to say his name aloud. The following night Shiuli suffers a seizure and dies as her lungs collapsed. Emotionally broken, Dan visits Shiuli's home and comforts her family. Afterwards, he is seen collecting her death certificate tearfully.

In a later scene, Vidya tells Dan that she was named Shiuli because of her fondness for the shiuli flower, which she loved collecting as a child with her grandfather. She further remarks how shiuli flowers are short-lived, as they live all night and die by dawn; to which Dan sorrowfully points out, her daughter too, was short-lived like her namesake flowers.

Several months later, Dan is rehired by the hotel where he completes his diploma and now works as a sous chef. One day, he notices several missed calls from Vidya and visits her. Pointing at the shiuli plant in the backyard, Vidya tells Dan about her family shifting to their hometown Trichy. She doesn't wish to leave Shiuli's plant behind, but Dan assures her that he would take care of it.

As the story ends, Shiuli's family has moved and Dan carries the shiuli plant with him, as a symbol of his devotion to Shiuli and the effect she had on him.

== Cast ==
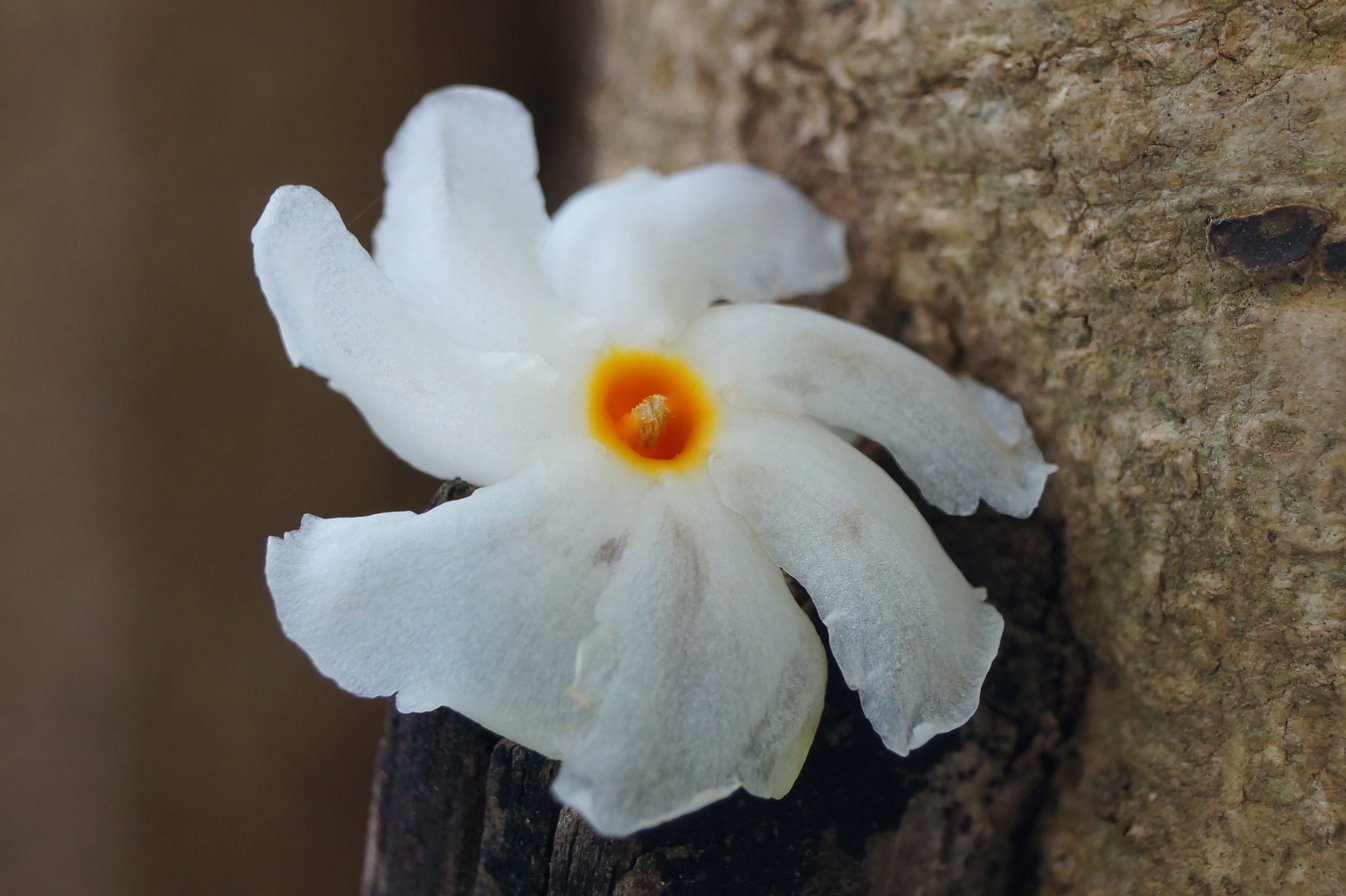
Shiuli flower as seen in the film's logo

- Banita Sandhu – Shiuli, Dan's subordinate trainee, named after the flower Shiuli, because of her fondness for it, by her mother.
- Gitanjali Rao – Prof. Vidya Iyer, Shiuli's mother, a professor of IIT Delhi
- Varun Dhawan – Danish "Dan" Walia, a hotel management trainee and career-oriented guy
- Sahil Vedoliyaa – Manjeet, Dan's roommate
- Ashish Ghosh – Dr. Ghosh
- Isha Chaturvedi – Ishani, a fellow intern of Dan and Shiuli
- Prateek Kapoor – Asthana, supervisor of the interns at the hotel where they are understudies
- Shekhar Murugan – Jairam Iyer, Shiuli's paternal Uncle
- Karamveer Kanwar – Kunal Iyer, Shiuli's younger brother

== Production ==
=== Conception ===
The idea behind the film was conceived and inspired by newspaper articles and reports about whether comatose people and those with brain injuries hear when we talk to them and the spiritual exercise which brings them back.

=== Filming ===
Principal photography began in September 2017, and concluded in November 2017. The film was entirely shot in Delhi at Dwarka with a few portions shot in Connaught Place, New Delhi and Defence Colony, South Delhi. In Delhi, it was also shot in a 5-star hotel for 30 days where Varun Dhawan practiced as a hotel management student, performing his daily chores and the idea behind which was for Varun to grasp body-language and behaviour to bring more authenticity to his character in the film.

== Marketing and release ==
Varun Dhawan and Rising Sun Films first teased October in a 10-second clip released on 23 January 2018 to their official Twitter and YouTube handles, respectively. On 14 February 2018, the first-look teaser trailer of the film was released. It was followed by the release of first-look (also theatrical release) poster and official trailer on 9 March 2018 and 12 March 2018. In an interview, Shoojit Sircar said that writers do not get much credit like they do in the West. He said, "It is important to acknowledge all the technicians in the film, especially the one who conceives it, the writers". He feels that a writer's contribution is as important as any actor's or director's. This was the reason which made him "deliberately" give Juhi Chaturvedi's credit in the trailer and "made sure the industry notices". He further added that the Hindi film industry doesn't think writing to be important. For them, it's more "the actor, then the director, how you shoot the film and how expensive".

Initially, the film was scheduled to release on 1 June 2018. But in October 2017, Dhawan, in one of his tweets, revealed that the release date has been advanced. The film was released on 13 April 2018 across 2308 screens worldwide.

== Music ==
The soundtrack is composed by Shantanu Moitra, Abhishek Arora and Anupam Roy, and features playback singers such as Armaan Malik, Rahat Fateh Ali Khan, Sunidhi Chauhan and Monali Thakur. The background score of the film is composed by Moitra who also provided music for 3 tracks on the film's soundtrack album. It was released on 28 March 2018 by Zee Music Company and generally received positive reviews from the critics. The album consists of five tracks whose lyrics are penned by Abhiruchi Chand, Tanveer Ghazi and Swanand Kirkire.

=== Track listing ===
Lyrics for "Theher Ja" were written by Abhiruchi Chand, "Tab Bhi Tu" and "Manwaa" by Tanveer Ghazi and "Chal" by Swanand Kirkire.

1. "Theher Ja" – Armaan Malik
2. "October" (Theme Music) – Shantanu Moitra
3. "Tab Bhi Tu" – Rahat Fateh Ali Khan
4. "Manwaa" – Sunidhi Chauhan
5. "Chal" – Monali Thakur

== Reception ==
=== Box-office ===
View source data.

As of 10 May 2018, October has grossed over ₹49.92 crore (US$5.2 million) in India, and as of 6 May 2018, ₹34.5 million (US$360,000) in North America (USA and Canada), ₹07.1 million (US$74,000) in United Kingdom, ₹03.2 million (US$33,000) in Australia and ₹01.1 million (US$11,000) in New Zealand making a worldwide total of ₹545 million (US$5.7 million), which is more than twice the production budget of the film. It had a domestic opening of ₹42.5 million (US$440,000), which grew to ₹62.5 million (US$650,000) and ₹72.5 million (US$750,000) on the second and third days. The collection decreased to ₹12.5 million (US$130,000) by the eighth day with spikes of ₹22.5 million (US$230,000) and ₹27.5 million (US$290,000) on the ninth and tenth days. By the fifteenth day, the collection was ₹03.6 million (US$37,000), The film grossed ₹06.3 million (US$65,000) and ₹07.2 million (US$75,000) on the sixteenth and seventeenth days, then dropped to ₹00.1 million (US$1,000) by the forty-second day of its domestic run.

=== Critical response ===
On review aggregator website Rotten Tomatoes, the film holds an approval rating of 91%, based on 11 reviews, with an average rating of 7.4/10. Raja Sen of NDTV gave the movie 5 out of 5 stars calling it a wonder. Rajeev Masand of News18 said that, "October is a thoughtful, meditative film about love, grief, mortality, and the making of a man". He praised the performances of the lead actors and gave the film a rating of 3.5 out of 5. Rohit Vats of Hindustan Times gave the film a rating of 4.5 out of 5 and appreciated the performances of the cast, with particular praise directed towards Dhawan's performance about whom he said that, "It's a terrific performance, his best for sure". The critic said that "October, a month in autumn, is more than just a symbol in Shoojit Sircar's new film. It covers a lifetime. It brings haunting images, evokes tears, makes you anxious and then leaves you blank. You’re numb while waiting to return to reality." Shubhra Gupta of The Indian Express gave the film a rating of 2.5 out of 5 and said that, "I liked much of October, but didn't fall in love with it." but she did praise the performances of the cast and the writer of the movie, Juhi Chaturvedi. Madhureeta Mukherjee of The Times of India gave the film a rating of 4.5 out of 5 and said that, "It's not a story crafted with heavy doses of dialogues, romantic ballads or bombastic tropes common to the genre. The beauty lies in the simplicity of it all.".

== Awards and nominations ==
Date	Awards	Category	Recipient(s) and nominee(s)	Result	Refs.
30 June 2018	NBT Utsav Award	Best Actor	Varun Dhawan	Won	
10 August 2018	Indian Film Festival of Melbourne	Best Actor	Varun Dhawan	Nominated	
10 August 2018	Indian Film Festival of Melbourne	Best Director	Shoojit Sircar	Nominated	
16 December 2018	Screen Awards	Best Film (Critics)	Shoojit Sircar, Ronnie Lahiri and Sheel Kumar	Nominated	
16 December 2018	Screen Awards	Best Actor (Critics)	Varun Dhawan	Nominated	
23 March 2019	Filmfare Awards	Best Actor (Critics)	Varun Dhawan	Nominated	
23 March 2019	Filmfare Awards	Best Supporting Actress	Gitanjali Rao	Nominated	
23 March 2019	Filmfare Awards	Best Female Debut	Banita Sandhu	Nominated	
23 March 2019	Filmfare Awards	Best Playback Singer (Female)	Sunidhi Chauhan for "Manwaa"	Nominated	
23 March 2019	Filmfare Awards	Best Background Score	Shantanu Moitra	Nominated	
23 March 2019	Filmfare Awards	Best Cinematography	Avik Mukhopadhyay	Nominated	
23 March 2019	Filmfare Awards	Best Sound Design	Dipankar Jojo Chaki	Nominated	

== Plagiarism Accusations ==
Sarika Mene, a Marathi filmmaker, had claimed that October plagiarised plot and characters from her 2017 film Aarti: The Unknown Love Story. She had filed a non-cognisable criminal complaint against makers of October at Vile Parle Police Station, Mumbai. Hemal Trivedi, also a Marathi filmmaker, who was working with Mene on the Bollywood-remake of Aarti, supported her claim via his facebook post. However, the team of Rising Sun Films had denied the allegations saying " … We have not heard of the film 'Aarti' nor do we have full details of the matter as yet. ... We will look into this and deal with it appropriately".

In an interview that occurred before the plagiarism accusation, Shoojit Sircar said that all the films that he had directed had been very personal to him and October explores experiences of the hospital life he had lived when his mother was comatose for three months. Moreover, the film's writer Juhi Chaturvedi also took care of her mother in the hospital for years before she was finally put on ventilator and couldn't be revived. Though Aarti is an amateur project but thematic similarities between both the films can't be ignored.

Despite Sircar's given statements in news interviews on the inspiration behind October, Mene said she won't give up easily and hired a new lawyer for the case because she had requested the makers of October to watch Aarti, to which they didn't respond but to no effect because ScreenWriters Association (SWA) cleared October of all the charges in a letter, dated 20 May 2018, written to Rising Sun Films and Juhi Chaturvedi from Dispute Settlement Committee set up by SWA on 5 May 2018 on the basis of facts that though "... both the films may overlap, the treatment ... is very different ... " and " ... most of the details already existed ... in public domain through news articles and reports about Sunny and Aarti's story".

Even after being cleared from all the accusations, on 9 June 2018, Juhi received another legal notice from Mene claiming again that the story of October was plagiarised from Aarti. The notice demands Sunny Pawar to be credited and monetary compensation for her not being able to make a Hindi adaptation of Aarti, whose rights she had sold to Hemal Trivedi to work on it.
