= Migration (2023 film) =

2023 animated adventure film

- Theatrical release poster
- Directed by: Benjamin Renner
- Screenplay by: Mike White
- Story by: Mike White; Benjamin Renner
- Produced by: Chris Meledandri
- Starring: Kumail Nanjiani; Elizabeth Banks; Keegan-Michael Key; Awkwafina; Danny DeVito
- Edited by: Christian Gazal
- Music by: John Powell
- Production companies: Universal Pictures; Illumination
- Distributed by: Universal Pictures
- Release dates: October 19, 2023 (VIEW Conference); December 22, 2023 (United States)
- Running time: 83 minutes
- Country: United States
- Language: English
- Budget: $72 million
- Box office: $301.2 million

Migration is a 2023 American animated adventure comedy film directed by Benjamin Renner and written by Mike White, from a story they developed. Produced by Illumination and Universal Pictures, the film stars the voices of Kumail Nanjiani, Elizabeth Banks, Keegan-Michael Key, Awkwafina, and Danny DeVito. The story follows a family of mallards who try to convince their overprotective father to go on a vacation of a lifetime and attempt to migrate from New England, through New York City, to Jamaica.

Illumination announced Migration in February 2022, with Renner and White attached as director and writer, respectively. Renner, who had previously helmed traditionally animated films, including Ernest & Celestine (2012) and The Big Bad Fox and Other Tales... (2017), was tasked with adapting his simple drawing style for a computer-animated film. In hiring Renner, studio head and producer Chris Meledandri sought to focus on a filmmaker's vision for the project in comparison with Illumination's recent films. John Powell composed the score, marking his second collaboration with Illumination following The Lorax (2012).

Migration premiered at the VIEW Conference in Turin, Italy, on October 19, 2023, and was theatrically released in the United States on December 22 by Universal Pictures. The film received generally positive reviews from critics and grossed $301.2 million worldwide.

== Plot ==
In New England, anxious Mack Mallard discourages his children Dax and Gwen from venturing beyond their home Moosehead Pond, to the displeasure of his wife Pam. One day, the pond is visited by a flock of ducks who are migrating south to Jamaica. After Mack initially refuses to migrate, a disappointed Pam tells Mack that he must open his eyes to the world before he misses the opportunity. That night, Mack decides to let his family migrate after being persuaded by Uncle Dan, who also joins them. As they begin their journey, the Mallards discover that they are flying in the opposite direction.

During a thunderstorm, they take shelter in a swamp underneath a boardwalk where they encounter elderly great blue heron Erin, who invites them to spend the night with her and her husband Harry in their shack. Despite the herons' frightening countenances, Erin proves their good intentions by saving Dax and Gwen from a catfish that almost swallows them whole. The next day after leaving the swamp, the Mallards arrive in New York City where Uncle Dan gets them in trouble with a flock of pigeons, led by the pugnacious Chump. Pam defuses the situation, and Chump introduces them to her friend Delroy, a homesick scarlet macaw from Jamaica who is caged by a cruel human chef that kidnapped him from his home. Despite Dax's plea to help get the key, Mack and Pam infiltrate the restaurant where the chef works to acquire the key to Delroy's cage and manage to free him; he guides them to Jamaica in return.

While Gwen stops for a bathroom break, the group finds an entrance to a resort inhabited by pekins. They enjoy the resort until Dax discovers it is a duck farm, with the chef from the restaurant earlier being its current client to purchase the pekins for food. Mack tells Dax to go back to Pam, but he instead alerts the pekins in order to help save them. However, he loses his wing feathers after being stepped on by the chef, rendering him flightless while Mack saves him. The family, Delroy, and the pekins narrowly escape the farm. They stop at a seaside motel to rest, where Mack sternly scolds Dax for disobeying him and putting his life at risk, upsetting Dax.

Later after the sun sets, the chef catches up and finds the birds via helicopter, capturing them all except for Dax and Gwen, who hide. Inside the helicopter, the chef intends to kill Mack and Pam first as revenge, putting them both in a smaller, separate cage. Feeling hopeless and fearing the kids are lost, Pam begins regretting their migration until Mack bolsters her confidence, knowing she never gave up on anything, especially on him. Using a salsa dance they did back at the restaurant, and with Delroy and Uncle Dan's assistance, Mack and Pam try to kick a button to open the larger cage the others are trapped in by Mack pumping/kicking his legs out and Pam kicking hers out, but the chef catches them in the act. A vengeful Delroy, aided by Uncle Dan and the pekins, pelts the chef with food as payback until he is knocked unconscious, hitting the trapdoor button as he, along with Mack and Pam, fall out. The chef gets caught in the cargo net, while the caged Mack and Pam continue to fall until Dax and Gwen save them, after Dax had used Delroy's discarded feathers to repair his wings. Mack and Dax reconcile while Delroy, Uncle Dan, and the pekins escape by breaking through their cage.

Now led by Dax, the birds arrive in Jamaica, where Delroy reunites with his family and friends while the Mallards catch up with the duck family who visited their pond earlier. Mack thanks Pam for helping him open his eyes to the world, and the birds soon dance in celebration. The following spring, the Mallards meet a group of Emperor penguins, whom they help bring back to the South Pole as the Mallards set off on another adventure.

== Voice cast ==
- Kumail Nanjiani as Mack Mallard, the patriach of his family
- Elizabeth Banks as Pam Mallard, the daring and quick-witted wife of Mack
- Caspar Jennings as Dax Mallard, Mack and Pam's confident and restless older son
- Tresi Gazal as Gwen Mallard, Mack and Pam's innocent younger daughter
- Danny DeVito as Uncle Dan, Mack's curmudgeonly, adventure-averse uncle, Dax and Gwen's great-uncle
- Keegan-Michael Key as Delroy, a homesick Jamaican-accented scarlet macaw locked away in a restaurant in New York
- Awkwafina as Chump, the gruff, one-footed leader of a New York pigeon gang
- Carol Kane as Erin, an elderly great blue heron whom the Mallards befriend on their journey
- David Mitchell as GooGoo, the yogic leader of an American Pekin flock who join the Mallards and Delroy on their journey after escaping their farm
- Isabela Merced as Kim, a duck whose family is heading to Jamaica

Boris Rehlinger, who previously voiced the Wolf in the French dub of Benjamin Renner's previous animated film The Big Bad Fox and Other Tales..., voices the unnamed chef who hunts down Mack and his family, though he has no speaking lines since the character only yells and growls. In the UK edition, musician Tom Fletcher and his wife, actress Giovanna Fletcher, cameo as the ducks Joe and Ellie.

== Production ==
=== Development and writing ===
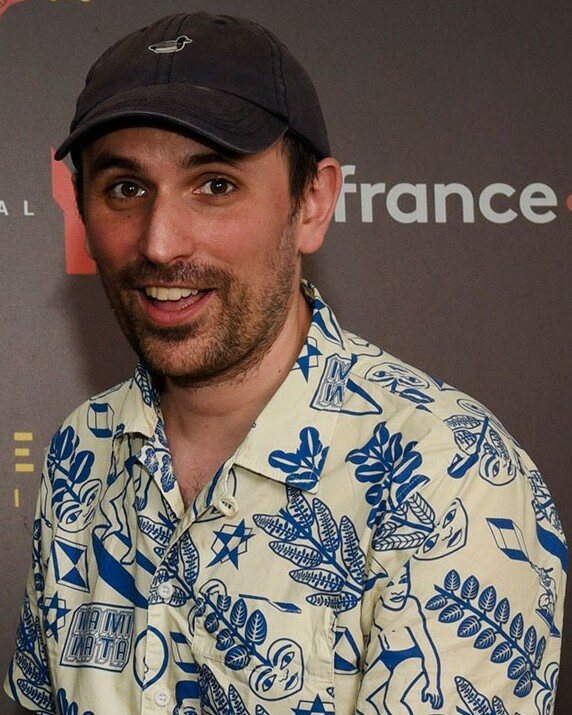
Director Benjamin Renner in 2023

In February 2022, Illumination announced a new film titled Migration, with French animator and comic book creator Benjamin Renner set to direct and Mike White set to pen the script. In April 2023, more film crew such as co-director Guylo Homsy, editor Christian Gazal, and production designer Colin Stimpson were revealed. Renner previously directed the traditionally animated films Ernest & Celestine (2012) and The Big Bad Fox and Other Tales... (2017), and was already a household name among the staff of Illumination Studios Paris prior to his involvement with the company. Illumination head and film producer Chris Meledandri hired Renner to direct the studio's first original project since 2016 for his filmmaking sensibility, stating that during his visit to the Annecy International Animation Film Festival that there is a "filmmaker attention" for Migration in comparison with Illumination's recent releases up to The Super Mario Bros. Movie (2023). Overall, the budget was $72 million at minimum.

Renner described Migration as Little Miss Sunshine (2006), but with ducks. The film's tone becomes more tense as the story progresses. Renner drew influences from his childhood experiences and dynamics with his family when making humorous situations for the Mallard family. Gwen and the situations surrounding her character are inspired by his experiences as the youngest sibling in his family. When shaping the film's humor, Renner wanted to avoid "lazy jokes", which he felt were common in family films. He aimed for a sense of humor that could appeal to both children and adults. For example, he made sure that any slapstick humor in the film was both thought through and had an extra dimension to it. Additionally, a general rule he made for himself was for there to be no fart jokes. The filmmakers sought to treat the humans in the film in the way they believed ducks perceived them. Renner said, "The humans are treated like animals in the movie, in that only the birds understand each other."

White described the film as using a "comedic fantasy landscape" to explore its central themes. He said that the film has more depth than a standard children's film and a lot of Illumination's output, but still retains a zaniness that appeals to children. Renner described the main theme in the film as "getting out of your comfort zone, facing life, and accepting that fear is part of life."

=== Casting ===
In April 2023, Kumail Nanjiani, Elizabeth Banks, Keegan-Michael Key, Awkwafina, Danny DeVito, Caspar Jennings, Tresi Gazal (in her film debut), David Mitchell, and Carol Kane were announced to be part of the film's lead voice cast. Renner made sure that the cast members connected with their respective characters. For example, Nanjiani's love for routine and his stand-up comedy sketches of him complaining about things made him connect with Mack, while Banks is open to trying new things and new experiences, making her connect with Pam. Tresi is the daughter of the film's editor, Christian Gazal, and was brought in to provide scratch vocals for Gwen. She would end up voicing the character in the finished film.

=== Animation and design ===
The film's animation was handled by Illumination Studios Paris. Renner was tasked with adapting his minimalist drawing style from previous films for a computer-animated film, which requires more extensive detail; he had previously designed the visuals for the French-Belgian computer-animated film about migrating birds titled Yellowbird (2014), which was noted for not strictly adhering to photorealism. Renner described the difference between traditional animation and computer animation as being that the former is additive while the latter is subtractive. Working with computer animation, the director found that there were many elements he felt did not belong, such as texture, lighting and shading. For the opening scene, Renner wanted to do something that was visually different from the rest of the film. He said that it is "a story before we get to the real story of the film." The scene is not actually traditional animation, but rather computer animation that looks traditional. Renner first did the scene using traditional animation, and then the team recreated it using computer animation, keeping as close to the reference as possible.

For Migration, Renner explained that he took inspiration from naturally expressive animals in the wild in creating characters that have distinctly expressive features in their designs. He described the ducks as challenging to design by the team. He recalled a team of 50 animators studying a real duck at Illumination. Stimpson said, "Ducks are strange, complex-looking creatures and they all look alike!" As a result, designing the characters to both look appealing and distinct from one another was difficult. Nature was the main inspiration for the color palette of the film; it contrasted with the more heightened color palettes of previous Illumination films. A trip Stimpson took to New York City helped in forming the location in the film. According to Stimpson, great care was taken in portraying Jamaica. The setting in which the Mallards arrive is inspired by the country's Blue Mountains. The visuals in the scene with the heron couple were inspired by The Cabinet of Dr. Caligari (1920). That scene is followed by one with the Mallards flying through the clouds. Renner's view of the clouds during his plane trips to Illumination Studios Paris inspired the scene.

== Music ==
On June 18, 2023, it was announced that John Powell would compose the film's music, marking his second collaboration with Illumination following The Lorax (2012). Renner wanted a score that had "a level of unusual creativity" and fun. The score uses a lot of string instruments and human vocals. Powell tried emulating 1960s music, in which there were a lot of vocals, and Renner responded positively. He also felt that he may have gotten the gig after expressing his admiration of Sergei Prokofiev's Peter and the Wolf (1936) to the director. Mon Laferte performed a Spanglish cover of Destiny's Child's 2001 single "Survivor" for the film. The soundtrack album was released on December 15, 2023.

== Release ==
=== Theatrical ===
Migration's world premiere took place on October 19, 2023, as the grand summit matinee of the VIEW Conference expo in Turin, Italy. The film was theatrically released in the United States on December 22, and is the first animated film to be released worldwide in the ScreenX format. It was accompanied in theaters by the Despicable Me short film, Mooned. The film was initially scheduled for release on June 30, 2023, but was postponed to its final release date, with DreamWorks Animation's Ruby Gillman, Teenage Kraken later taking its original date. On June 14, 2023, Illumination gave a special 25-minute preview of Migration at the Annecy International Animation Film Festival, with Renner and Meledandri attending the event.

=== Home media ===
Migration was released on digital download on January 23, 2024, and on DVD, Blu-ray and 4K Ultra HD on February 27. It includes three short films—Fly Hard, Mooned, and Midnight Mission.

== Reception ==
=== Box office ===
Migration grossed $127.6 million in the United States and Canada, and $173.6 million in other territories, for a worldwide total of $301.2 million.

In the United States and Canada, Migration was released alongside Aquaman and the Lost Kingdom, Anyone but You and The Iron Claw, and was projected to gross $10–15 million from 3,761 theaters in its four-day opening weekend. The film made $5.8 million on its first day, including $1.5 million from Thursday night previews. It went on to debut with $12.5 million, finishing third at the box office, and marked Illumination's lowest-grossing opening weekend. In its second weekend, the film made $17.2 million, finishing second. the film then made $10 million in its third weekend of release, finishing in fourth place.

=== Critical response ===
On the review aggregator website Rotten Tomatoes, 73% of 105 critics' reviews are positive, with an average rating of 6.3/10. The website's consensus reads: "Beautiful animation and entertaining work from a talented voice cast help Migration take flight in spite of a story that doesn't quite stand out from the flock." Metacritic, which uses a weighted average, assigned the film a score of 56 out of 100, based on 25 critics, indicating "mixed or average" reviews. Audiences surveyed by CinemaScore gave the film an average grade of "A" on an A+ to F scale, while PostTrak reported 79% of filmgoers gave it a positive score, with 52% saying they would definitely recommend the film.

La Croix's Stephane Dreyfus, although finding the plot predictable, gave the film 3 stars out of 5 and praised its sense of burlesque. Michael Ordoña of the Los Angeles Times felt that the plot was unambitious. However, they praised the film for differing from Illumination's previous filmography, particularly in the animation, humor, and voice performances. Lovia Gyarkye of The Hollywood Reporter praised the film's direction, humor, and emotional core and concluded that its "considerable appeal perhaps lies in the simplicity of its premise: The hardest part of embarking on any new journey is taking off." Writing for the San Francisco Chronicle, Zaki Hassan compared Migration favorably to Illumination's other 2023 film, The Super Mario Bros. Movie, saying, "While that film found success thanks to multigenerational nostalgia, this one soars higher by creating an original world and making the audience feel invested in the characters' journeys." Aparita Bhandari of The Globe and Mail felt that the film retained a balance between appealing to younger and older audiences and directed particular praise to Tresi Gazal's voice performance.

Soren Andersen of The Seattle Times gave the film a 2 out of 4 star rating and, in contrast, felt the film lacked appeal for older audiences, criticizing its lack of subtlety in its themes. Jake Coyle of the Associated Press commended the animation for its "warm cartoon tones" and "lush sense of color", but felt that the story was unoriginal, writing that "it never quite spreads its wings." Kristen Page-Kirby of The Washington Post also directed praise at the animation, but felt the story lacked memorability and concluded, "Migration will be remembered as neither great nor terrible. It will simply fade into the cinematic ether like so many ducks in the wind." Ryan Gaur of IGN gave the film a 5 out of 10 and felt that Migration was a step above Illumination's previous filmography with its animation and character dynamics, but was weighed down by a "tedious" plot and the occasional "typical brand of Illumination humor".

=== Accolades ===
Accolades received by Migration
Award	Date of ceremony	Category	Recipient(s)	Result	Ref.
Hollywood Music in Media Awards	November 15, 2023	Best Original Score — Animated Film	John Powell	Nominated	
Annie Awards	February 17, 2024	Outstanding Achievement for Voice Acting in an Animated Feature Production	Tresi Gazal	Nominated	
Visual Effects Society Awards	February 21, 2024	Outstanding Virtual Cinematography in a CG Project	Guylo Homsy, Damien Bapst, Antoine Collet, David Dangin	Nominated	
Golden Reel Awards	March 3, 2024	Outstanding Achievement in Sound Editing – Animated Feature Film	Daniel Laurie, Josh Gold, Richard Gould, Luke Dunn-Gielmuda, Scott Guitteau, Thom Brennan, E. Larry Oatfield, Sean England, Andrea Gard, Bill Bernstein	Nominated	

== Lawsuit ==
In June 2026, screenwriter Kenneth Giavara sued Illumination for copyright infringement due to similarities with his script titled South for the Winter. In September 2026, Illumination and the other defendants filed a motion to dismiss the lawsuit, arguing that Migration was not substantially similar to Giavara's screenplay.
