= Cheenti Cheenti Bang Bang =

2008 Indian animated comedy film

- Theatrical Poster
- Directed by: R D Mallik
- Produced by: Shri Sushil Bahety; Shri Rajiv Bahety
- Starring: Sabyasachi Chakrabarty; Anjan Srivastava; Mahesh Manjrekar; Ashish Vidyarthi; Asrani
- Music by: Jeet Gannguli
- Distributed by: Elecom Fiesta Production
- Release date: October 2008
- Country: India
- Language: Hindi
- Budget: ₹3.75 crore
- Box office: ₹15 lakh

Cheenti Cheenti Bang Bang is a 2008 Indian animated comedy film directed by R D Mallik.

== Reception ==
The film was widely panned by the critics. Gaurav Malani of The Economics Times wrote "Flipping across an antique ant-elephant joke book would be more amusing. Cheenti Cheenti Bang Bang surely calls for some pest control." The Indian movie website Indiaglitz.com gave a negative review, saying "On the whole, Cheenti Cheenti Bang Bang fails to get added with Antz or A Bug's life", and both awarded the film single star out of five.

== Soundtrack ==
No.	Title	Lyrics	Artist	Length
1.	"Cham Cham"	Nida Fazli	Shaan
2.	"Chirongo Pitti"		Joy
3.	"Baje Bigul"		Sudesh Bhosle
4.	"Ghanana Ghanana"		Ustad Rashid Khan
5.	"Jhil Mil [Hindi]"	Nida Fazli	Shaan, Shreya Ghoshal
6.	"Lets Be One [Hindi]"		Kunal Ganjawala
7.	"Chain Kulli Ki Main Kulli"		Kunal Ganjawala
8.	"Right Here Right Now [Hip Hop Mix]"		Abhishek Bachchan, Sunidhi Chauhan
9.	"Idhar Chala Main Udhar Chala (Originally composed by Rajesh Roshan)"		Udit Narayan, Alka Yagnik
10.	"Hey Hey Tum Ho"		Srinivas, Sujatha

== See also ==
- List of Indian animated feature films
