= The Adventures of Sinbad (film) =

2013 Indian movie

- Theatrical release poster
- Directed by: Shinjan Neogi; Abhishek Panchal
- Screenplay by: Manoj Sethi
- Story by: Affan Khan; Amman Khan
- Based on: Sinbad the Sailor
- Produced by: Afzal Ahmed Khan
- Cinematography: Shinjan Neogi
- Edited by: Shinjan Neogi
- Music by: Firoze Patel; Kaizad Patel
- Production company: Lodi Films Pvt. Ltd.
- Distributed by: PVR Directors Rare
- Release date: 22 March 2013
- Running time: 110 minutes
- Country: India
- Language: Hindi

The Adventures of Sinbad is an Indian 2D animated film featuring the story of Sinbad the sailor. Produced by Afzal Ahmed Khan and directed by duo Shinjan Neogi and Abhishek Panchal; this animated movie released on 22 March 2013.

== Synopsis ==
The Adventures of Sinbad is a 2D animated movie about Sinbad (a 12-year-old boy) and his friends. The little sailor of legend is framed by the King of darkness Sahzaman for the treasure of seven seas, and must travel to his realm at the end of the world to retrieve it and save the life of King Nazab (the king of the city of Baghdad), who is also father of princess Xina. The extremely adventures voyage for the hunt of the greatest treasure witness the most terrifying dark evil power of Sahzaman and the fights of our sailor of legend Sinbad and his friends.

== Cast ==
- Vaibhav as Sinbad
- Manju as Xina
- Jeet as Qasim
- Sunil Tiwari as Sahzamaan
- Vandana as Saara
- Yogesh as King Nazab
- Saakshi as Heera

== See also ==
- List of indian animated feature films
