= Mother Teresa & Me =

2023 Indian film

- Directed by: Kamal Musale
- Written by: Kamal Musale
- Produced by: Kamal Musale; Jacqueline Fritschi-Cornaz
- Starring: Banita Sandhu; Jacqueline Fritschi-Cornaz; Deepti Naval
- Cinematography: Keiko Nakahara
- Music by: Laurence Crevoisier; Walter Mair; Peter Scherer
- Release date: 5 May 2023
- Country: India
- Languages: Hindi; English

Mother Teresa & Me is a 2023 Hindi-language biographical drama film directed by Swiss-Indian filmmaker Kamal Musale. It was released in theaters on 5 May 2023 and stars Swiss actress Jacqueline Fritschi-Cornaz in the titular role of Mother Teresa, Banita Sandhu as Kavita, and Deepti Naval as Kavita's nanny.

The film narrates the interconnected stories of Mother Teresa and Kavita, a young British woman of Indian origin. It portrays Mother Teresa's early years in India and how she suffered while trying to work outside the convent.

== Plot summary ==
The film begins with Kavita, a young British woman played by Banita Sandhu, who faces personal struggles and travels to Calcutta to find clarity. There, she reconnects with her old nanny, played by Deepti Naval, who had cared for her during her childhood. This nanny, who was the first girl adopted by Mother Teresa back in the 1960s, shares her experiences, drawing the narrative back to that era.

The story then shifts to a young Mother Teresa, portrayed by Jacqueline Fritschi-Cornaz, showcasing her dedicated work with the poor. Despite her external resolve, Mother Teresa experiences deep spiritual struggles and feelings of abandonment by Jesus, a lesser-known aspect of her life. These parallel stories highlight the personal journeys of faith, compassion, and self-discovery.

== Cast and characters ==
=== Main cast ===
- Banita Sandhu as Kavita
- Jacqueline Fritschi-Cornaz as Mother Teresa
- Deepti Naval as Mother Superior
- Shobu Kapoor as Aparna
- Vikram Kochhar as Dr. Ahmed
- Kezia Burrows as Johanna
- Kevin Mains as Rupert
- Liza Sadovy as Sister Agnes

=== Supporting cast ===
- Gavi Singh Chera as Rajiv
- Bryan Lawrence as Van Exem
- Heer Kaur as Sister agnes
- Tom Bonington as Father Meuleman
- Lata S. Singh as Sister #2 in Train
- Preetam Ganguly as Priest
- Jaynit Parmar as Medical Doctor
- Stephen Schreiber as Helmut
- Claire Lacey as Doctor
- Kym Vincenti as Hospital patient
- Deepti Dyondi as Sister Maria
- Debashree Chakrobarty as Shanti
- Izabella Urbanowicz as Albania
- Momita as Student (as Momita II)
- Manisha Mondal as Student
- Elaine Carman Roberts as Nurse Receptionist
- Jina Baishya as Mita
- Mahi Khan as Young Deepali
- Ilyas Raphaël Khan as Musician

== Critical reception ==
Mother Teresa & Me received a range of responses from critics. Abhishek Srivastava of Times of India awarded the film 3 out of 5 stars, noting "While “Mother Teresa & Me” is a sincere effort to portray the lives of two determined women side by side, it falls short of providing a truly immersive experience for viewers. Despite its honest intentions, the film misses an opportunity to create a truly captivating and memorable story".

The Catholic World Report highlighted mixed reactions. Some Catholics praised the film for its portrayal of Mother Teresa and the inspiration it provided. However, Fr. Brian Kolodiejchuk, the postulator for the cause of beatification and canonization for Mother Teresa, criticized the film for its depiction of Mother Teresa's spiritual struggles. He felt that the film did not fully capture the depth of her faith and perseverance.

Abhinav of Telangana Today also commented on the film, stating, "Director Kamal Musale could have done wonders but stopped short of delivering a masterpiece for reasons best known to him."

== Criticism ==
Fr. Kolodiejchuk voiced strong criticism of the film. As the editor of Mother Teresa's personal correspondence, Fr. Kolodiejchuk highlighted that the film misrepresented her "darkness." He insisted that the producers were unaware of Mother Teresa's interpretation of her spiritual struggles and their significance to her life and vocation.

Several Catholic leaders praised the film. Fr. Robert Sirico, president emeritus of the Acton Institute, described the film as well-written, acted, and produced. Derry Connolly, president of the John Paul the Great Catholic University, called it "one of the best saint movies" he had seen in a long time.

Fr. Gerald Murray commended the film for its depiction of love and humanity, while Greg Schleppenbach of The Culture Project International and James Stella of the Mother Teresa Project at Ave Maria University also shared positive views.
