= True Love Story (film) =

- Directed by: Gitanjali Rao
- Written by: Gitanjali Rao
- Story by: Gitanjali Rao
- Music by: Tapatam - EarthSync/Laya Project
- Release date: 5 February 2014 (Mumbai IFF)
- Running time: 19 minutes
- Country: India
- Language: Silent

True Love Story is a 2014 Indian animation short film written and directed by Gitanjali Rao. The silent film is a coming-of-age romance film set in streets of Mumbai, where a flower-seller falls in love with a bar dancer, that too in Bollywood-fantasy style.

In February 2014, the film won the Golden Conch Best Animation Film Award at the 2014 Mumbai International Film Festival (MIFF). At the 2014 Cannes Film Festival the film was one of 10 selected short films at Critics' Week.
