= Printed Rainbow =

- Official poster designed by K. K. Muralidharan
- Directed by: Gitanjali Rao
- Written by: Gitanjali Rao (also Animator)
- Produced by: Gitanjali Rao
- Music by: Rajivan Ayappan
- Release dates: May 2006 (International Critic's Week 2006, Cannes, France); 22 April 2015 (Worldwide)
- Running time: 15 minutes
- Country: India

Printed Rainbow is a 2006 Indian animated short film directed, animated and produced by Gitanjali Rao. It was first screened in the International Critic's Week 2006 film festival held in Cannes, France.

== Plot ==
An old phillumenist woman lives in a small flat, and uses her collection of matchboxes covers to dream away to more imaginative worlds.

== Music ==
Background score for the film is composed by Rajivan Ayappan. It also features one folk song Na Ja Balam Pardes sung by Begum Akhtar.

== Awards ==
Three awards as best short film at the Cannes International Critic's Week 2006 festival including:

- Kodak Short Film Award
- Critic's Award
