= Mahayoddha Rama =

- Release poster
- Directed by: Rohit Vaid
- Starring: Kunal Kapoor; Jimmy Shergill; Mouni Roy; Gulshan Grover
- Production company: Contiloe Entertainment
- Release date: 4 November 2016
- Country: India
- Language: Hindi

Mahayoddha Rama is a 2016 Indian Hindi-language animated film directed by Rohit Vaid. The film won the National Film Award for Best Animated Film. Mahayoddha Rama narrates the story of Ramayana from Ravan's perspective.

== Voice cast ==
- Kunal Kapoor as Rama
- Jimmy Shergill as Laxman
- Mouni Roy as Sita
- Lillete Dubey as Kaikeyi
- Mukesh Rishi as Hanuman

Gulshan Grover, Gaurav Gera, Kiku Sharda, Roshan Abbas, Sadashiv Amrapurkar and Ameen Sayani all voice a head of the ten-headed Ravan.

== Production ==
The film was made in 2008. Sameera Reddy was initially considered to play Sita.

== Soundtrack ==
Music by Aadesh Shrivastava. Lyrics by Javed Akhtar.

== Reception ==
Arnab Banerjee of Deccan Chronicle gave the film a negative review and wrote that "What is also unbearable, at times, is the earsplitting background score: so loud it sounds that as a reflex action, you wish you could close your eyes to diminish the assault". Kunal Guha of Mumbai Mirror said that "For those who’ve watched the televised version in the '80s on Doordarshan, this would hardly be nostalgic. If anything, it will ruin your childhood memories forever." Reza Noorani of The Times of India said that "The movie is purely for kids, because it doesn’t offer much in the way of narrating Ramayana differently to grown-ups. Considering it was made eight years ago, the animation is good. However, in 2016, it leaves you wanting for more". Shubhra Gupta of The Indian Express said that "The animation of this movie is eye-catching but it is drowned by sheer noise".
