= Bombay Rose =

2019 Indian animated film

- Film poster
- Directed by: Gitanjali Rao
- Written by: Gitanjali Rao
- Produced by: Anand Mahindra; Rohit Khattar
- Starring: Cyli Khare; Amit Deondi; Gargi Shitole; Anurag Kashyap; Makrand Deshpande; Geetanjali Kulkarni; Shishir Sharma; Virendra Saxena; Amardeep Jha
- Edited by: Gitanjali Rao
- Music by: Cyli Khare; Yoav Rosenthal
- Production company: Cinestaan Film Company
- Distributed by: Netflix
- Release dates: 28 August 2019 (Venice); 8 March 2021
- Running time: 97 minutes
- Country: India
- Languages: Hindi; English

Bombay Rose is a 2019 Indian animated film written, edited, designed and directed by Gitanjali Rao. The film had its world premiere at International Critics Week at the 2019 Venice Film Festival. It was screened in the Contemporary World Cinema section at the 2019 Toronto International Film Festival. The film follows the story of a flower seller falling in love. It was made by frame-by-frame painted animation in computer and took 60 artists 18 months to complete. Earlier scheduled for release on 4 December 2020 on Netflix, the film was released on the platform on 8 March 2021.

== Plot ==
Kamala is a Hindu flower seller who lives with her grandfather, a watchmaker, and sister Tara, a school-going girl. She migrated to Bombay with her family, after escaping a forced child marriage to an old wealthy man. For financial support, Kamala also works at a bar named Pyaasa as a dancer, attracting the attention of Mike, a pimp. He manages to find an employment offer for her as a maid in Dubai, and desires to take half of the two lakh rupees she would be receiving as monthly salary. Tara shares a bond with Shirley D'Souza, an actress from the 1950s, who teaches her English. Every day, they have a walk to the cemetery, where Shirley leaves a red rose at the grave of her lover. However, she is angered to find that someone is stealing her roses on a daily basis.

Kamala has a recurring dream of being a Hindu princess in the Mughal era, falling in love with a Muslim prince. One day, she notices that Salim, another flower seller across the street, has feelings for her. He is a Muslim refugee from Kashmir who had migrated to Bombay after his parents' death, and is looking for a decent employment. They both fall in love, but never communicate with each other beyond exchanging glances and flowers. Meanwhile, Tara saves Tipu, an orphaned deafmute kid, from being arrested by the police for child labour. Kamala lets Tipu stay with them and is friendly, whereas her grandfather is initially upset with his presence.

One day, Mike observes Kamala and Salim together. That evening, he tricks Salim into visiting Pyaasa and reveals Kamala's identity as one of the dancers. Salim feels cheated as Kamala never told him about this, and leaves. Shortly, Kamala too finds out that Salim steals flowers from the cemetery (including Shirley's roses) and sells them for a living. This creates a rift between the couple. Kamala is further troubled when she receives the news that Pyaasa would be shut down soon, and Mike assures her employment in Dubai.

One day, Tara and Shirley go to an antique shop owned by Anthony Pereira, who has feelings for the latter. Shirley wants to have her toys repaired, and Tara suggests that they approach her grandfather who can repair them. Tara also gets Tipu to assist her grandfather in repairing the toys, which helps the duo bond well. He finds Tipu to be a very keen assistant and agrees to let him stay with them. Once the toys are repaired, Tara brings them to Anthony's shop. Shirley invites Anthony to her house that night for a date, and he readily accepts.

That night, Salim meets Kamala and takes her to the cemetery, and puts back all the flowers he had collected to sell, indicating his change of heart. This impresses Kamala and they go on a walk together. As they approach Pyaasa, the police arrest all the pimps and dancers on a tip by Mike. As the couple tries to escape, Mike alerts the police and they chase them. As Kamala hides in safety, Salim is hit by a car driven by Raja Khan, a film actor he idolises. Kamala is left heartbroken as she watches Salim die in her arms, and Anthony too finds Shirley lying dead in her house.

Shirley leaves some of her assets to Anthony, including a piano he loved, and some funds to support Tara's education. When he meets Kamala and her grandfather to discuss the prospects of opening a toy repair shop, Mike arrives with tickets to Dubai. Kamala tears the tickets and leaves. When Mike threatens to reveal her identity as a bar dancer, Kamala hits back saying that the bar which employed her does not exist anymore, leaving her free. In the end, Kamala and her grandfather are shown running a toy repair and watch making store named "Bombay Rose" with Anthony's support.

== Voice cast ==
- Cyli Khare as Kamala
- Gargi Shitole as Tara
- Amit Deondi as Salim
- Anurag Kashyap as Raja Khan
- Makrand Deshpande as Mike
- Geetanjali Kulkarni as Flower Seller
- Shishir Sharma as Anthony Pereira
- Virendra Saxena as Kamala's Grandfather
- Amardeep Jha as Mrs D'Souza

== Production ==
The film's director Gitanjali Rao said the film was inspired by the lives of "street dwellers in Bombay" where there is "a day-to-day struggle for survival, steeped in deprivation" along with homelessness and lack of basic human rights, "so the people escape to the cinemas to forget reality. But when the same Bollywood fantasies begin to influence and replace reality, the balance is lost. Bombay Rose is based on this struggle of dreams and reality." She said the contemporary Bollywood industry does "not inspire me in any way" but rather her inspiration comes from "independent films made in India and the world, regional Indian films, pre-Bollywood-era Hindi films and world cinema."

The film was made by frame-by-frame painted animation in computer and took 18 months with 60 artists.

== Reception ==
The film holds a 91% score on Rotten Tomatoes, based on 22 reviews, with an average rating of 6.80/10. On Metacritic, the film has a weighted average score of 64 out of 100, based on reviews from 7 critics, indicating "generally favorable reviews". Baradwaj Rangan gave the film a positive review and said, "Bombay Rose subverts not just Bombay cinema’s storytelling, but also the implicit assumptions of Bombay cinema." Guy Lodge of Variety said that Rao's "exquisitely realized debut feature offers folk-influenced visual splendor to compensate for some jumbled storytelling." Xan Brooks from The Guardian wrote: "Bombay Rose’s high-stakes melodrama might be ripped from the real world, but it has been powdered and perfumed – crammed full of archetypes and over-egged emotions, liberally sprinkled with musical interludes."

Fionnuala Halligan of Screen International felt that the film is "at heart a dark story, yet it can also shine brightly, dealing with heartbreak and hope, a perilous life in the slums of Mumbai in which death is always close by but a big-screen Bollywood escapist ending is equally only a cinema ticket away." Gautaman Bhaskaran of Arab News said that the color palette's in the film were "may be opulent and eye-catching" but the storytelling "is weak, probably a result of poor editing and wanting to pack in too much."
