= Banita Sandhu =

Welsh actress (born 1997)

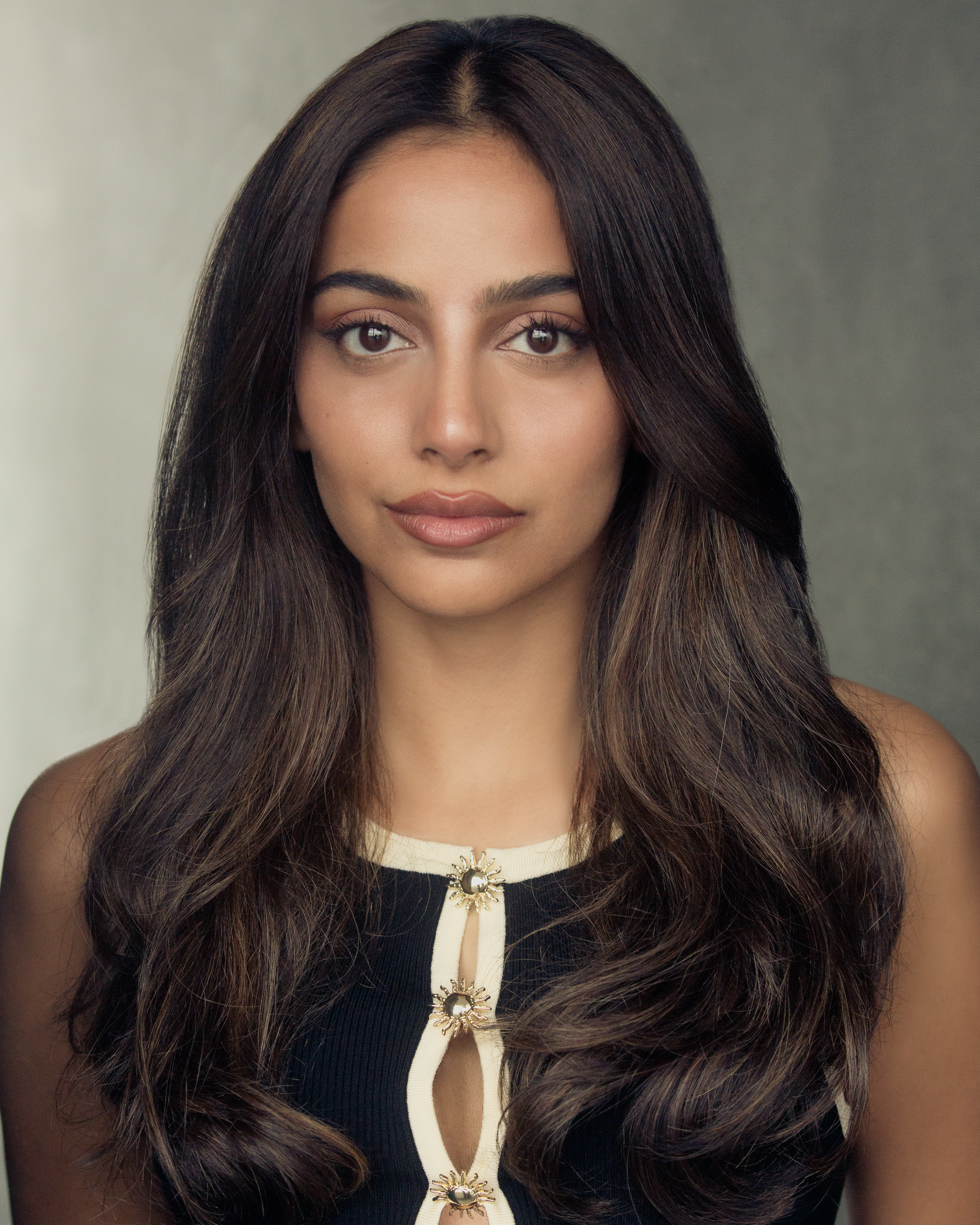
- Sandhu in 2025
- Born: 22 June 1997 (age 29); Caerleon, Wales
- Education: King's College London
- Occupation: Actress
- Years active: 2018–present

Banita Sandhu (born 22 June 1997) is a Welsh actress, known for her work in Indian cinema. She made her debut with the 2018 Hindi-language film October, for which she received a Filmfare Award nomination. She later starred in the Tamil-language film Adithya Varma and the American sci-fi series Pandora, both released in 2019.

== Early life ==
Sandhu was born and brought up in Caerleon, Wales to first-generation British Indian Sikh parents. She began acting at the age of 11 and moved to London at 18 to start her degree in English literature at King's College.

== Career ==
Sandhu in 2018

Sandhu first appeared in an ad for Wrigley's Doublemint and one for Vodafone India in 2016. Her first feature film came in 2018, with October. Raja Sen of NDTV noted, "Sandhu is impressively consistent, and has a winsomeness that suits her character's name". She then appeared in the American TV series Pandora, in 2019.

Also in 2019, Sandhu made her debut in Tamil cinema, with Adithya Varma. Haricharan Pudipeddi of Hindustan Times stated, "Sandhu as Meera is aptly cast and she really sells the vulnerability of her character quite convincingly." In 2021, she appeared in the film Sardar Udham. Following this, Sandhu acted in the British production Mother Teresa & Me (2023) and the televsion series Bridgerton (2024).

In 2025, she appeared in Detective Sherdil, and a year later, she acted in the film Main Vaapas Aaunga.

== Filmography ==
Key
†	Denotes films that have not yet been released

=== Film ===
List of film appearances, with year, title, role, and language shown
Year	Title	Role	Language	Notes	Ref.
2018	October	Shiuli Iyer	Hindi		
2019	Adithya Varma	Meera Shetty	Tamil		
2019	Eternal Beauty	Alex	English		
2021	Sardar Udham	Reshma	Hindi		
2023	Mother Teresa & Me	Kavita	English		
2025	Detective Sherdil	Shanti Bhatti	Hindi		
2026	Main Vaapas Aaunga	Kaveri	Hindi		
2027	Samuk †	TBA	Hindi	Filming	

=== Television ===
List of television appearances, with year, title, role, and language shown
Year	Title	Role	Language	Notes	Ref.
2019	Pandora	Delaney Pilar	English	Season 1	
2021	Star Stable: Mistfall	Skye Rowan	English	Voice role; season 1	
2024	Bridgerton	Sita Malhotra	English	Season 3	

=== Music videos ===
List of music video appearances, with year, title, artist, and language shown
Year	Title	Artist	Language	Ref.
2018	"Jind Mahi"	Diljit Dosanjh	Punjabi	
2023	"With You"	AP Dhillon	Punjabi	

== Awards and nominations ==
Year	Award	Category	Work	Result	Ref.
2019	Filmfare Awards	Best Female Debut	October	Nominated	
2020	South Indian International Movie Awards	Best Female Debut – Tamil	Adithya Varma	Nominated	
