= National Film Award for Best Animated Film =

Indian film award

- National award for contributions to Indian Cinema
- Sponsored by: Directorate of Film Festivals
- Rewards: Swarna Kamal (Golden Lotus); ₹1,00,000
- First award: 2006
- Final award: 2016
- Most recent winner: Mahayoddha Rama

Highlights
- Total awarded: 5
- First winner: Kittu

The National Film Award for Best Animated Film was one of the National Film Awards presented annually by the Directorate of Film Festivals, the organisation set up by Ministry of Information and Broadcasting, India. It was one of several awards presented for feature films and awarded with a Golden Lotus (Swarna Kamal). At the 70th National Film Awards, the category was discontinued and combined with Best Special Effects. The new award is named as National Film Award for Best Film in AVGC ( Animation, Visual Effects, Gaming & Comic) with two categories, one for the producer and director, and the other one for visual effects supervisor.

The award was instituted in 2006, at 54th National Film Awards and awarded annually for films produced in the year across the country, in all Indian languages; Hindi (3 awards), Tamil and Telugu (1 each).

The award includes a cash prize of ₹1,00,000.

== Winners ==
List of award films, showing the year (award ceremony), language(s), producer(s), director(s) and animator(s)
Year	Film(s)	Language(s)	Producer(s)	Director(s)	Animator(s)	Refs.
2006 (54th)	Kittu	Telugu	Bhargava Kodavanti	B. Sathya	–	
2007 (55th)	Inimey Nangathan	Tamil	S. Sridevi	S. Venky Baboo	Mayabimbham Media P Ltd	
2008 (56th)	Roadside Romeo	Hindi	Aditya Chopra	Jugal Hansraj	Tata Elxsi/VCL	
2009 (57th)	No Award					
2010 (58th)	No Award					
2011 (59th)	No Award					
2012 (60th)	Delhi Safari	Hindi	• Anupama Patil • Kishor Patil	Nikhil Advani	Rafique Shaikh	
2013 (61st)	No Award					
2014 (62nd)	No Award					
2015 (63rd)	No Award					
2016 (64th)	Mahayoddha Rama	Hindi	Contiloe Pictures Pvt. Ltd.	Rohit Vaid	Deepak S.V	
