= History of animation in India =

The history of animation in India can be traced to the early 20th century. Precursors to modern animation such as shadow puppets and slide shows entertained audiences before the advent of the cinema. Pioneers such as Dadasaheb Phalke, Gunamoy Banerjee, K.S. Gupte and G.K. Gokhle kept the tradition of animation alive during the first half of the 20th century. Such individuals were usually self-taught and were inspired by foreign cartoons.

== Pre-Independence ==
Even before the birth of animation, shadow-puppet traditions used images to tell stories. A notable example is tholu bommalata ("the dance of the leather puppets") from the state of Andhra Pradesh. The puppets used were large, had multiple joints, and were coloured on both sides. This meant that coloured shadows were projected onto the screen. Performances were accompanied by music. Folk tales and various epics such as the Mahabharata and Ramayana were dramatised.

The Shambharik Kharolika was another means of entertainment that pre-dated the age of the cinema. A series of hand-painted glass slides were projected using an apparatus called the "magic lantern". Mahadeo Gopal Patwardhan and his sons were responsible for popularising the medium across parts of India in the late 19th century. Patwardhan initially took it up as a hobby after being inspired by his friend Madan Madhav Rao Vitale, who was an engineer. Eventually, elements such as dialogue, narration, lyrics and background music were added. The first public show was held on 20 February 1892 in Kalyan, Mumbai. The first grand tour ended on 27 December 1895 at the 11th session of the Indian National Congress in Pune. The slides depicted various tales from the Ramayana, Sita Swayamvar, Mahabharata, Sati Anasuya, Raja Harishchandra, Shekhar Dashratha and the circus. The circus slides were sponsored by the proprietors of the Chhatre's Grand Circus. Works by painters Raja Ravi Verma and Madhavrao Dhurandhar were also recreated.

It is said that Raja Harishchandra's story in the form of an animated slide show was an influence behind prolific filmmaker Dadasaheb Phalke's first movie Raja Harishchandra, produced in 1913. Raja Harishchandra is notable for being India's first indigenous silent feature film.

Often referred to as the father of Indian cinema, Phalke dabbled in animation as well. His 1912 short The Growth of a Pea Plant introduced the concept of time-lapse photography, with one frame shot per day. In 1915 he produced the animated short Agkadyanchi Mouj (Matchsticks' Fun). He had probably been inspired by Émile Cohl’s matchstick film. This was followed by Laxmicha Galicha (animated coins), and Vichitra Shilpa (inanimate animation). Phalke was forced into making shorter works such as cartoons and documentaries since the war in Europe had slowed imports, including film. Unfortunately, animated works such as Agkadyanchi Mouj and Vichitra Shilpa have not survived the ravages of time. However, Phalke’s craftsmanship can still be seen in the title sequence of his last silent film, Setu Bandhan, made in 1932.

In 1934, the first Indian animated film with a soundtrack, On a Moonlit Night, was released. The film is often credited to composer and orchestra leader R.C. Boral, but this attribution may be erroneous.

The Pea Brothers, directed by Gunamoy Banerjee and produced by New Theatres Limited, was released in Calcutta on 23 June 1934, making it the first Indian animated work to be released in theatres. The film was between 3 and 4 minutes long and used drawn black and white images. The plot consists of a pea-pod which opens up to release 5 peas, and from these peas emerge five small toy-like figures that play with one another. The film was basically an experimental attempt and hence lacked a proper storyline. It resembled the tradition of Disney and other foreign animators, whose films were released quite often in Calcutta.

Pune-based Prabhat Film Company's Jambu Kaka was released in Bombay on 15 November 1934. The short features a jackal and was animated by Raghunath K. Kelkar. Around the same time, K.S. Gupte and G.K. Gokhle were teaching themselves animation by watching American cartoons. Their first experiment in animation was called Shikaar ("The Hunt").

Other shorts from the period include Bakam Bhatt by Kolapur Cinetoons, Lafanga Langoor (1935) by Mohan Bhavani, Superman's Myth (1939) by G.K. Ghokhle, and Akash Pataal (1939) by Mandar Malik.

The shortage of raw film stock due to the Second World War may have caused filmmakers to choose animation as a medium.
