= BIGFlix =

Indian movie on demand service

- Type: Private company
- Industry: Movie on demand service, on-line movie library
- Founded: 2012
- Headquarters: Mumbai, India
- Website: bigflix.com

BIGFlix is a Reliance Entertainment owned movie on demand service in 2008. It is India's first movie on demand service.

The portal offers films, movie trailers, and reviews, on and about Indian entertainment. Movies are available in different genres like action, comedy, drama, romance etc., and cater to several Indian languages like Hindi, Telugu, Tamil, and Bengali.

== See also ==
- Online Video Rental
- Reliance Industries
- Indian Cinema
