= Super K – The Movie =

Super K
- Film poster
- Directed by: Vijay S. Bhanushali; Smita Maroo
- Written by: Vibha Singh; Jaspinder S. Kang
- Produced by: Smita Maroo
- Production company: Point Studio
- Distributed by: Shemaroo Entertainment
- Release date: 11 November 2011
- Running time: 95 minutes
- Country: India
- Languages: English; Hindi

Super K (also known as Kiara the Brave in the United States) is a 2011 Indian animated fantasy film written by Vibha Singh and Jaspinder S. Kang and directed by Smita Maroo and Vijay S. Bhanushali, from a story concept by Maroo. The film was produced by Smita Maroo and released by Shemaroo Entertainment.

== Plot ==
Dreamzone is a special world in the Galaxy, ruled by the kind-hearted King Maximus with his daughter Princess Kiara. Unknown to him, his brother Dreadmus is plotting to overthrow him. Dreadmus creates Super K, a boy superhero, using the powers of all the Dreamzonians. But a goof-up causes Super K to turn out a freak in Dreadmus's view, unable to control his powers, and he is deserted by Dreadmus, who leaves his minions named Accidentally and Suddenly to take care of Super K. Dreadmus befriends the evil Dr. Ozox, a masked alchemist who has his own sinister plan to take over Dreamzone.

Super K and his friends come together to protect Dreamzone from the evil clutches of Dr. Ozox, but at the same time, Super K has to learn to control his powers.

== Characters ==
- Princess Kiara
- Super K
- King Maximus
- Badmess (Dreadmus in the US)
- Accidentally and Suddenly
- Destiny
- Dr. Ozox
- Cyberbaba (Mesmoriser in the US)
- The Sun
- Venus
- Earth
- Mars
- Jupiter
- Saturn

== Release and reception ==
The film was released on Yahoo! Movieplex, a feature of the Yahoo! India web site, as an exclusively online animated feature film. In 2012, it was released directly to video in the United States as Kiara the Brave, with cover art showing only princess Kiara (a secondary female character with red hair). This was considered by many to be an obvious attempt to remind consumers of the female, red-headed protagonist of Brave, a Pixar Animation Studios film set in medieval Scotland. Upon release, the film was panned by critics.

== See also ==
- List of Indian animated feature films
