= Kundan Satti =

2023 Tamil film

- Theatrical release poster
- Directed by: P. K. Aghasthi
- Written by: Arangan Chinnathambi (dialogue)
- Story by: P. K. Aghasthi
- Produced by: S. A. Karthikeyan
- Starring: Sriram; Vidyuth Srinivas; Vishodhan
- Edited by: B. S. Vasu
- Music by: M. S. Amargeeth
- Production company: Shellammal Movie Makers
- Release date: 13 October 2023
- Running time: 106 minutes
- Country: India
- Language: Tamil

Kundan Satti is a 2023 Indian Tamil-language animated children's film directed by P. K. Aghasthi. It was released on 13 October 2023.

== Plot ==
Kundan Satti is set in the peaceful village of Koranattu Karuppur near Kumbakonam and follows the daily lives of a group of fifth-grade students. The story portrays their experiences at school and within the community, highlighting the challenges they face in balancing education, family expectations, and societal values. Throughout the film, the children learn important lessons about perseverance, the value of traditional foods, and the significance of maintaining personal and environmental hygiene. Respect for elders and the importance of cultural heritage are also emphasized as key themes. The narrative aims to inspire young audiences by promoting positive behavior, encouraging academic focus, and fostering an understanding of rural life in Tamil Nadu.

== Voice cast ==
The title derives its name from the two lead characters Kundaeswaran and Sattiswaran.

- Sriram
- Vidyuth Srinivas
- Vishodhan

== Production ==
Prior to release, the firm garnered attention for being directed by P. K. Aghasthi, a 12-year-old girl from Chennai. She initially wanted to write a book on a story based in Kumbakonam but after learning animation during the COVID-19 lockdown, she wanted to make a film.

== Soundtrack ==
The music was composed by M. S. Amargeeth and features three songs. The lyrics are written by Arangan. The songs are sung by Sriram, Vidyuth Srinivas and Vishodhan.

- "Chittu Kuruvi Pola"
- "Ooda Ooda" -
- "Theme Song"

== Reception ==
The film was released on 13 October 2023 across theatres in Tamil Nadu. A critic from Maalai Malar praised the film intentions, but questioned the quality of the animation. A reviewer from Thinaboomi gave the film a positive review.

== Awards and recognition ==
Kundan Satti received the Generation Next – Grade Schooler: Student Animated Feature award at the Tamil Nadu Film Festival (TNFF) in 2024. The film was also honored at the Norwegian Tamil Film Festival with the Norway Tamil Film Award (NTFF). P. K. Aghasthi earned recognition as Best Young Director from a consortium of Tamil Nadu private schools and was praised by notable figures including the Governor of Telangana.
