= VIEW Conference =

Computer graphics event in Turin, Italy

VIEW Conference is a weeklong event held each October in Turin, Italy, focusing on visual effects, animation, gaming, computer graphics, virtual and mixed reality and other entertainment-related technologies. The English-language event offers keynotes, panels, master classes and workshops presided over by entertainment industry professionals. The lineup typically includes directors, producers, VFX supervisors, animation supervisors, computer graphics experts, cinematographers and composers, among others. The executive director of VIEW Conference is Maria Elena Gutierrez.

== History ==
The event was created in 2000 as Virtuality Conference. It changed its name for its eighth edition, in 2007, adopting the acronym VIEW, meaning "Virtual Interactive Emerging World". The content of the conference has changed and evolved over the years as well. While still focusing on "virtual reality", the VIEW Conference now includes emerging digital technology and applications including animation, special effects, virtual architecture, and videogames. Speakers of the various editions include Grant Major, Scott Farrar, Roger Guyett, John Knoll, Alvy Ray Smith, Glen Keane, Byron Howard, Brad Lewis, Walter Murch, Mike Mitchell and Walt Dohrn.

In 2005 the VIEW Conference established the "VIEW Award", an international award for 3D animated and VFX short films, targeted to students, artists and filmmakers. As of 2016 the award has five categories, Best Short, VIEW Social Contest ( aimed at involving visual artists, designers and computer graphics lovers with works using 2D/3D animation and/or VFX focusing on themes of social relevance), View Game Award, VIEWTube Video Award and Italianmix.

== See also ==
- SIGGRAPH
- VIEW Fest
- Computer Graphics
- 3D Cinema
