= Baweja =

Baweja may refer to:

== People ==
- Harry Baweja (born 1956), Indian film director; husband of Pammi
- Harman Baweja (born 1980), Indian actor and dancer; son of Harry and Pammi

== Other uses ==
- Baweja Movies, an Indian film production company owned by Harry and Pammi Baweja
