= Bommarillu =

2006 Indian film by Bhaskar

- Theatrical release poster
- Directed by: Bhaskar
- Written by: Bhaskar; Abburi Ravi (Dialogues)
- Produced by: Dil Raju
- Starring: Siddharth; Genelia; Prakash Raj
- Cinematography: Vijay K. Chakravarthy
- Edited by: Marthand K. Venkatesh
- Music by: Devi Sri Prasad
- Production company: Sri Venkateswara Creations
- Distributed by: Sri Venkateswara Creations
- Release date: 9 August 2006
- Running time: 168 minutes
- Country: India
- Language: Telugu
- Budget: ₹6 crore
- Box office: est. ₹50 crore

Bommarillu (transl. Toy House) is a 2006 Indian Telugu-language romantic comedy family drama film directed and co-written by Bhaskar in his directorial debut, and produced by Dil Raju. The film stars Siddharth, Genelia, and Prakash Raj. The cinematography was handled by Vijay C Chakravarthy and editing done by Marthand K. Venkatesh. The music for the film was composed by Devi Sri Prasad, whose soundtrack of the film received positive reviews from critics. The film primarily revolves around the relationship between a father and son, in which the father's excessive concern for his son, and interference in his life, leads to the latter harbouring bitterness towards his overbearing father.

The film opened to Indian audiences on 9 August 2006. On its way to winning state honours and rave reviews, the film went on to win several Filmfare Awards among other prominent awards and was one of the highest grossing Telugu films of that year. Following the film's critical and commercial success, it was remade in Tamil as Santosh Subramaniam (2008), in Bengali as Bhalobasa Bhalobasa (2008), in Odia as Dream Girl (2009), and in Hindi as It's My Life (2020).

== Plot ==
Siddharth, affectionately known as Siddhu, is a young man living in a rigid household dominated by his overbearing father, Aravind. While Aravind believes he is providing the absolute best for his family, his constant micromanagement completely stifles his children's choices. Aravind expects Siddhu to join his established construction empire, but Siddhu secretly harbors dreams of launching his own independent firm, leading him to consistently fabricate excuses to his father. Complicating matters, Aravind arranges Siddhu's engagement to Subbalakshmi, a wealthy friend's daughter. Like Siddhu, Subbalakshmi is entirely controlled by her own father, but to Siddhu's dismay, she accepts her lack of autonomy without complaint.

While contemplating his bleak future at a temple, Siddhu experiences a chance encounter with Hasini, a free-spirited, cheerful, and energetic college student. Drawn to her uninhibited nature and capacity to find joy in life's smallest moments, Siddhu begins meeting her regularly and falls deeply in love. Simultaneously, he takes a step toward independence by applying for a bank loan to fund his dream business. When Siddhu finally confesses his love to Hasini, he also honestly admits to his forced engagement. Though initially heartbroken, Hasini returns a few days later to confess her reciprocal feelings, urging him to stand up to his family and break off the alliance. As she departs on her college bus, an ecstatic Siddhu shouts his love for her, unaware that a furious Aravind is watching from afar.

Upon being harshly reprimanded at home, Siddhu finds the courage to confront his father. He proposes a compromise: Hasini will stay with their family for one week so Aravind can judge her character fairly. To make this happen, Siddhu convinces Hasini to join, while deceiving her protective father, Kanaka Rao, into believing she is on an academic field trip. Though the family initially treats Hasini with cold detachment, her warmth and innocence gradually win them over. However, unfamiliar with the house rules, Hasini inadvertently lets slip details about Siddhu’s external life, including his secret bank loan application. Frustrated by the breach of secrecy, Siddhu scolds Hasini, creating an emotional rift between them.

The tension peaks during a family wedding. Disregarding Siddhu's warnings, Hasini engages in playful antics that Aravind views as socially inappropriate. The situation worsens when a heavily intoxicated Kanaka Rao accidentally wanders into the venue, narrowly missing his daughter. Stressed and anxious, Siddhu berates Hasini and insults her father. In retaliation, an angry Hasini exposes Siddhu's own hypocrisies, revealing to his listening family that Siddhu frequently gets drunk and curses Aravind behind his back. The revelation shocks the household, and a humiliated Siddhu lashes out at Hasini in anger.

At the end of the trial week, Hasini announces her departure to both Siddhu and Aravind. She explains that Siddhu has begun trying to alter her personality to fit his father's rigid standards. Declaring that she refuses to live a double life of perpetual pretense like Siddhu, she leaves. Returning home to a furious Kanaka Rao, a heartbroken Hasini promises to unconditionally submit to his choices from then on. Meanwhile, Siddhu is left utterly miserable, recognizing the validity of her words.

When Aravind later confronts his son over his persistent depression, Siddhu's mother, Lakshmi, steps in and fiercely criticizes her husband for causing their son's misery. Seizing the moment, Siddhu finally opens his heart to his father, explaining how Aravind's suffocating overprotection has stripped him of self-respect and basic happiness his entire life. Confronted with the painful reality of his parenting, a remorseful Aravind apologizes, steps back from his controlling role, and promises to help Siddhu win Hasini back.

Siddhu immediately meets with Subbalakshmi and her family to call off the wedding. Empowered by Siddhu's honesty, Subbalakshmi stands up to her own father, refusing to marry a man who does not love her. Next, Aravind and Siddhu approach Kanaka Rao to seek forgiveness. While Kanaka Rao accepts the apology, he refuses to permit the relationship, having previously witnessed Siddhu in a drunken state on the street. Turning the tables, Aravind proposes that Kanaka Rao allow Siddhu to live with his family for a week under his supervision. Following a tumultuous but sincere week-long stay, Siddhu successfully proves his genuine character, earning Kanaka Rao's blessing and happily reuniting with Hasini.

== Cast ==
- Siddharth as Addala Siddharth "Siddhu"
- Genelia as Hasini (Voice dubbed by Savitha Reddy)
- Prakash Raj as Addala Aravind, Siddhu's father
- Jayasudha as Addala Lakshmi, Siddhu's mother
- Kota Srinivasa Rao as Kanaka Rao, Hasini's father
- Sunil as Satti, Siddhu's servant
- Satya Krishnan as Siddhu's sister-in-law
- Sudeepa Pinky as Bujji, Siddhu's sister
- Dharmavarapu Subramanyam as Kismat Kumar, lecturer in college
- Surekha Vani as Siddhu's elder sister
- Chitram Srinu as Kedimangina Sreenu, Siddhu's friend
- Vijay Sai as Vamsi, Siddhu's friend
- Ravi Varma as Ravi, Siddhu's friend
- Neha Bamb as Subbalakshmi, Siddhu's fiancée
- Bill Bitra as Chintu
- Brahmanandam as a loan officer
- Tanikella Bharani as Subbalaxmi's father
- Chalapathi Rao as Vamsi's father
- Venkata Sriram as Gautham, Siddhu's brother
- Stunt Silva as Rajesh; Haasini's friend turned eve teaser
- Raghunatha Reddy as a father of Siddhu's friend
- Narsing Yadav as a motorcycle driver
- Saptagiri as Hasini's gossiper

== Production ==
=== Development ===
Prior to Bommarillu, Bhaskar assisted Dil Raju in Telugu films such as Arya (2004) and Bhadra (2005). On the sets of the film Arya, Raju offered Bhaskar a film to direct. On the sets of Bhadra, Bhaskar narrated the story to Raju and the saga began. Thus, Bommarillu became the first directorial venture for Bhaskar. In an interview, he said that the story for the film began taking shape in as early as 1997 when he wrote about a father and a son's relationship. However, when the plans of making the film arose, an element of love between the protagonists was added. In the interview, he said that the script, to an extent, is autobiographical. He cites personal examples of some scenes from the film such as the choice of clothes for Siddhu by Aravind, the head-bump between the lead actors and Lakshmi singing in the kitchen.

In an interview, Vijay C Chakravarthy, the cinematographer for the film, said that Dil Raju offered him the position in November 2005. For the film, Vijay said that he made use of Arriflex 435 camera and Hawk lenses. In another interview, Bhaskar said working with Abburi Ravi, his co-writer, was unique. They used to converse in a closed room with a voice recorder, allowing the dialogues in the script to be natural. He also heaped praise on Marthand K. Venkatesh, the film's editor. After filming, the length of the film reel came to 16,200 feet (4,900 m) which amounted to a runtime of 3 hours and 15 minutes. The presence of Marthand brought this down to 15,100 feet (4,600 m). This meant a reduction in the runtime by 25 minutes.

=== Casting ===
The choice of Siddharth was because of the sheer relevance to the character in real life. However, they finalized the choice of the actor only after the script was ready. The choice of Genelia was based on her natural vivacity in real life. This and her eyes, according to Bhaskar, made her an obvious choice for her character. More so, she liked the one line story that Raju told and also a few scenes that he narrated to her. She immediately liked the character and consented for the role. The fact that her co-actor, Siddharth and she acted earlier together in Boys (2003), made them more comfortable to work with. The camaraderie that the lead actors shared during the filming, added to their performances. The choice of Prakash Raj was easy as he befitted the character he portrayed while, Jayasudha was persuaded to play the role of the lead actor's mother.

=== Filming ===
The shooting of the film took about three and a half months. The palatial house where the entire family stayed in the film is part of Ramanaidu Studios at Nanakramguda, Hyderabad. Several modifications were done by the art director, Prakash. A couple of the songs were shot in a montage, another couple in Frankfurt am Main and other places in Germany and one song each in this house set and at a temple in Kakinada.

== Soundtrack ==
For the film's music and soundtrack, Raju renewed his previous association (Arya and Bhadra) with Devi Sri Prasad. Siddharth sung one of the tracks from this film. The film has seven songs composed by Devi Sri Prasad with the lyrics primarily penned by Chandrabose, Ravi Kumar Bhaskarabhatla, Kulasekhar and Sirivennela Sitaramasastri. A repository of Indian songs has recommended the feel-good soundtracks to the audiences.

== Release and reception ==
This film had given Siddarth stardom in Telugu cinema. After 18 years, Bommarillu re-released on 21 September 2024.

=== Critical reception ===
The film received critical acclaim. Jeevi of Idlebrain.com gave the film a rating of 4.5/5. B. Anuradha of Nowrunning rated the film 5/5 stars and wrote, "Debutant director Bhaskar, weaving the film around an interesting plot, shows a conspicuous flair for comedy". Kishore of the same portal wrote, "'Bommarillu' is like a gentle gust of cool and fresh wind amidst the stench and stale air".

== Controversies ==
The film had its own share of controversies, just like Boys. A news report showcased the omnipresent piracy in the Telugu film industry by quoting the cheap prices at which the film was being sold. The film's producer, Dil Raju, ensured a special code on each distributed print to track piracy with a warning for copyright violation which would incur a fine or a jail term.

In April 2007, a case of copyright infringement was filed on the film's producer and director that prompted a court to stall the screening of the film. The allegation pointed out that the film was made based on a compilation of short stories that was released in 1997.

== Remakes ==
The Hindi remake of the film titled It's My Life was started by Boney Kapoor in 2007, and scenes were shot with Harman Baweja and Genelia. The film remained unreleased for over a decade, before having a direct-to-television premiere on 29 November 2020. The film was remade in Tamil, Bengali and Odia languages under the titles Santosh Subramaniam, Bhalobasa Bhalobasa and Dream Girl, respectively, in 2008 and 2009. Although it was remade in Bengali, the film was also dubbed in that language as Ki Likhi Tomay.

== Awards ==
Award	Category	Recipient	Result	Ref.
2006 Nandi Awards	First Best Feature Film	Dil Raju	Won	
2006 Nandi Awards	Best First Film of a Director	Bhaskar	Won	
2006 Nandi Awards	Best Supporting Actor	Prakash Raj	Won	
2006 Nandi Awards	Best Screenplay	Bhaskar	Won	
2006 Nandi Awards	Best Dialogue Writer	Abburi Ravi	Won	
2006 Nandi Awards	Best Female Dubbing Artist	Savitha Reddy	Won	
2006 Nandi Awards	Special Jury	Genelia	Won	
54th Filmfare Awards South	Best Film	Dil Raju	Won	
54th Filmfare Awards South	Best Director	Bhaskar	Nominated	
54th Filmfare Awards South	Best Actor	Siddharth	Nominated	
54th Filmfare Awards South	Best Actress	Genelia	Won	
54th Filmfare Awards South	Best Supporting Actor	Prakash Raj	Nominated	
54th Filmfare Awards South	Best Supporting Actress	Jayasudha	Nominated	
54th Filmfare Awards South	Best Music Director	Devi Sri Prasad	Won	
54th Filmfare Awards South	Best Lyricist	Bhaskarabhatla - "Bommanu Geesthe"	Nominated	
54th Filmfare Awards South	Best Male Playback Singer	Siddharth - "Apudo Ipudo"	Nominated	
54th Filmfare Awards South	Best Female Playback Singer	Gopika Poornima - "Bommanu Geesthe"	Nominated	
Santosham Film Awards	Best Film	Dil Raju	Won	
Santosham Film Awards	Best Female Debut	Genelia	Won	
Santosham Film Awards	Best Lyricst	Bhaskarabhatla - "Bommanu Geesthe"	Won	

== Home media ==
The DVD version of the film was released on 4 June 2007 and distributed by I Dream Dvd internationally. It is available in 16:9 Anamorphic widescreen, Dolby Digital 5.1 Surround, progressive 24 FPS, widescreen and NTSC format.

Awards
Preceded by Nuvvostanante Nenoddantana	Filmfare Best Film Award (Telugu); 2006	Succeeded by Happy Days
