= Mangat =

Mangat may refer to:

== Places ==
- Mangat, Pakistan, a town

== People ==
- Ajit Pal Mangat (fl. from 2008, Indian film director
- Amrit Mangat (born c. 1953), Canadian politician
- Faiz Mangat, of R&B/pop group Bro'Sis
- Mangat Ram Pasla (fl. 2001), Indian politician
- Mangat Ram Sharma (died 2016), Indian politician
- Mangat Ram Singhal (born 1942), Indian politician
