= Mohan Kumar =

Mohan Kumar may refer to:

- Mohan Kumar (director)
- Mohan Kumar (serial killer)
