= It's My Life (film) =

- Official release poster
- Based on: Bommarillu by Bhaskar
- Written by: Anees Bazmee
- Story by: Bhaskar
- Directed by: Anees Bazmee
- Starring: Harman Baweja; Genelia D'Souza; Nana Patekar
- Narrated by: Anil Kapoor
- Music by: Score: Tubby–Parik; Songs: Shankar–Ehsaan–Loy
- Country of origin: India
- Original language: Hindi

Production
- Producers: Boney Kapoor; Sanjay Kapoor
- Cinematography: Ravi Yadav
- Editor: Prashant Singh Rathore
- Production companies: Narsimha Enterprises; Sanjay Kapoor Entertainment Pvt. Ltd.

Original release
- Network: Zee Cinema
- Release: 29 November 2020

It's My Life is a 2020 Indian Hindi-language family comedy drama film written and directed by Anees Bazmee and produced by Boney Kapoor and Sanjay Kapoor. The film stars Harman Baweja and Genelia D'Souza, while Nana Patekar plays a supporting role. It is a remake of the 2006 Telugu film Bommarillu, with D'Souza reprising her role. The film began production on 14 August 2007 but had a delayed release on 29 November 2020.

== Plot ==
Abhishek "Abhi" Sharma is an energetic youngster from a rich family whose over-protective businessman father, the venerable Siddhant Kumar Sharma, wants him to take over the family business and has the final say in every decision of his son's life. Frustrated with this over-indulgence on Siddhant's part, Abhishek half-heartedly agrees to become engaged to Kajal, a rich man's daughter, but then falls for a middle-class young woman called Muskaan Mathur, unaware that he was involved in an incident with her father Manoj Mitter Mathur once, when drunk. Eventually, as she confesses her love for him, Abhishek loudly proclaims his love for Muskaan too, but is caught by Siddhant; in the drama that ensues, Siddhant agrees to Abhishek's request of meeting Muskaan once, giving him an ultimatum that she must prove her worth within 7 days.

Muskaan joins the Sharma family for a vacation in Thailand on a false pretext by lying to her father for the first time; over the course of the 7-day bound, her actions irritate Abhishek to no end, as he wants her to behave in a specific way. However, at his best friend's wedding, Abhishek bumps again into Manoj Mitter Mathur, who locates his daughter. An altercation between the lovebirds eventually culminates in Muskaan announcing that she doesn't want to marry Abhishek, despite Siddhant having secretly decided in favour of it. Muskaan is confined to house arrest by Manoj Mitter Mathur upon returning to Mumbai, and the Sharma family, including Abhishek himself and his mother Laxmi Sharma, finally confronts Siddhant about his overbearing nature. Siddhant comes to terms with his son's desire to marry a girl of his choice, and lets Abhishek and the others choose their own paths in life. Later, he meets Muskaan and brings her back to the Sharma family, while making the same deal to her father that he had made to Abhishek. The film ends with Abhishek and Muskaan getting married.

== Cast ==
- Harman Baweja as Abhishek "Abhi" Sharma
- Genelia D'Souza as Muskaan Mathur
- Nana Patekar as Siddhant Kumar Sharma, Abhishek's father
- Panchi Bora as Kajal, Abhishek's fiancée
- Kapil Sharma as Pyaare, Siddhant's domestic help
- Sharat Saxena as Manoj Mitter Mathur, Muskaan's father
- Inder Kumar as Jijaji, Abhishek's brother-in-law
- Shiju Kataria as Chutki Sharma, Siddhant's younger daughter
- Sonia Kapoor as Rama Sharma, Abhishek's elder sister
- Shyam Mashalkar as Shyam Chauhan, Abhishek's friend
- Kamal Chopra as Kajal's father
- Anuradha Patel as Gayatri Sharma, Abhishek's mother
- Asrani as Mr. Chauhan, Shyam's father
- Amar Upadhyay as Shekhar Sharma, Abhishek's elder brother
- Arzoo Govitrikar as Sanjana Sharma, Abhishek's sister-in-law
- Anil Kapoor as Narrator

== Production ==
In 2007, Genelia D'Souza, who portrayed the lead role in Bommarillu (2006), was chosen to reprise her role along with Harman Baweja and Nana Patekar. Boney Kapoor attributed the delay to Harman Baweja who gave priority to his other two film Victory and What's Your Raashee? (both 2009).

== Soundtrack ==
The soundtrack of It's My Life was composed by Shankar–Ehsaan–Loy in their only collaboration with Bazmee, and was released by T-Series in the week immediately preceding the film's premiere. There are six songs on the soundtrack, five of which, including the title track, are penned by Nilesh Mishra, and the sixth is penned by Shabbir Ahmed, in his only collaboration with the trio.

Track list
No.	Title	Singers	Length
1.	"It's My Life"	Mika Singh
2.	"Tu Maharani ( Lyrics: Shabbir Ahmed )"	Shankar Mahadevan, Loy Mendonsa, Akriti Kakar, Anusha Mani, Mani Mahadevan
3.	"Khamosh Tanhaiyon Mein"	Javed Ali, Hamsika Iyer
4.	"Na Samajh Dil"	Shaan
5.	"Toot Gayi Dor Koi"	Kailash Kher
6.	"Idiot"	K.K., Earl D'Souza

== Release ==
The film was released on Zee Cinema on 29 November 2020, more than a decade after beginning production.
