= List of highest-grossing Indian animated films =

This list ranks the highest-grossing Indian animated films by their box office performance.

== List ==
The following is a list of the top-grossing Indian animated films in terms of theatrical box office. Figures are approximate and listed in Indian Rupees (₹ crore).

*	Denotes films still running in theatres

Rank	Film	Year	Gross	Ref.
1	Mahavatar Narsimha	2025	₹326.82 crore	(Note: Mahavatar Narsimha's reported worldwide grosses vary between ₹300 crore (Hindustan Times, Cinema Express, News18) – ₹324.5 crore (The Economic Times) – ₹325 crore (DNA India))
2	Kochadaiiyaan	2014	₹30 crore	
3	Chaar Sahibzaade	2014	₹24 crore	
4	Hanuman	2005	₹11.47 crore	
5	Roadside Romeo	2008	₹6.46 crore	
6	Chhota Bheem and the Curse of Damyaan	2012	₹4.54 crore	
7	Motu Patlu: King of Kings	2016	₹4.44 crore	
8	Chhota Bheem and the Throne of Bali	2013	₹3.93 crore	
9	Chhota Bheem: Himalayan Adventure	2016	₹3.90 crore	
10	Jumbo	2008	₹3.38 crore	
11	Return of Hanuman	2007	₹2.81 crore	
12	Chhota Bheem: Kung Fu Dhamaka	2019	₹2.78 crore	
13	Delhi Safari	2012	₹2.29 crore	
14	Arjun: The Warrior Prince	2012	₹2.12 crore	
15	Ghatotkach – Master of Magic	2008	₹1.54 crore	
16	Mighty Raju: Rio Calling	2014	₹1.40 crore	
17	Mahabharat	2013	₹1.35 crore	
18	Krishna	2006	₹1.34 crore	
19	Hanuman Da Damdaar	2017	₹1.13 crore	
20	Krishna Aur Kans	2012	₹1.10 crore	

== See also ==
- List of highest-grossing animated films in India
