= Chaar Sahibzaade =

2014 Indian film by Harry Baweja

- Theatrical release poster
- Directed by: Harry Baweja
- Written by: Harry Baweja
- Produced by: Pammi Baweja
- Starring: Om Puri; Harman Baweja
- Narrated by: Om Puri
- Cinematography: Rowena Baweja
- Edited by: Ninad Khanolkar
- Music by: Anand Raj Anand; Jaidev Kumar; Harry Baweja
- Production companies: Baweja Movies; Irealities Technology
- Distributed by: Aanna Films; Sippy Grewal Production
- Release date: 6 November 2014
- Running time: 128 minutes
- Country: India
- Languages: Punjabi; Hindi
- Budget: ₹20 crore
- Box office: ₹24–33 crore

Chaar Sahibzaade (Punjabi pronunciation: [t͡ʃaːɾə̆ sɑː˦.ɦəbᵊzaːde]; transl. Four Princes) is a 2014 Indian Punjabi animated historical drama film written and directed by Harry Baweja and produced by Pammi Baweja, under Baweja Movies. It is based on the sacrifices of the sons of the 10th Sikh guru Guru Gobind Singh Ji—Sahibzada Ajit Singh, Jujhar Singh, Zorawar Singh, and Fateh Singh. Om Puri provided the film's narration, and the voice artists for various characters were kept anonymous. It was also the highest grossing Punjabi film when it was released (only surpassed by Carry on Jatta 2 in July 2018).

It was released on 6 November 2014 to positive reviews from critics and audiences, and emerged as a major box office success, eventually becoming the highest-grossing animated film to be produced in India. In 2025, it was overtaken by the Hindi animated film Mahavatar Narsimha (2025) produced by Kleem Productions and presented by Hombale Films.

== Synopsis ==
The film starts with the invasions of India by the Mughal Empire. Guru Tegh Bahadur Ji (the ninth Guru of Sikhdom) sacrificed his life for the rights and freedom of religion of the Kashmiri Pandits. Following this, Guru Gobind Singh Ji founded the Khalsa to counter the invading forces with martyrdom as the fundamental principle of defence. The film depicts the Battle of Anandpur (1700) in which the Mughal General Painde Khan was slain by Guru Gobind Singh. The film also depicts the Battle of Chamkaur which took place in December, 1704 CE in which forty two Sikhs (under Guru Gobind Singh Ji) fought against ten lakh Mughal forces under the command of Wazir Khan. In the Battle of Chamkaur, both the elder sons of Guru Gobind Singh Ji Sahibzada Ajit Singh and Sahibzada Jujhar Singh were killed in combat. The Mughals were composed of large numbers, yet ultimately failed to capture Guru Gobind Singh Ji, culminating in their defeat. The younger sons of Guru Gobind Singh Ji, Sahibzada Zorawar Singh and Sahibzada Fateh Singh, were taken to Wazir Khan's palace and were executed by the Mughal ruler of Sirhind. Wazir Khan gave orders that the masons immure both sons into a section of the city's wall.

== Cast ==
- Om Puri as the Narrator
- Harman Baweja

== Production ==
Pammi Baweja produced the film under the banner of Baweja movies. The Bollywood actor Harman Baweja is the creative producer of the film and Harry Baweja directed the film. The production took nearly five years. Harry Baweja spent two years doing research for the project. He met the "Dharam Parchar Committee" of Shiromani Gurdwara Parbandhak Committee and discussed his project. It is prohibited in Sikhism to depict Sikh Gurus in an animated form and their still images were used in this film. The voice artists for other characters were kept anonymous. The film was produced in Punjabi and Hindi and also dubbed in American English. Animation work for the movie was handled by iRealties and the film trailer was launched in Mumbai.

== Music ==
Chaar Sahibzaade
Song	Artists	Music director(s)	Running Time
Chaar Sahibzaade	Sukhwinder Singh	N/A	4:45
Sat Guru Nanak Pargatya	Asa Singh, Shipra Goyal, Asees Kaur, Arvinder Singh	Jaidev Kumar	4:02
Mittar Pyare Nu	Amrinder Gill	Anand Raaj Anand	4:47
Vela Aa Gaya	Jaspinder Narula, Shipra Goyal, Simran-Tripat	N/A	4:26
Sochte Hue Guru Aaram Karti Hui Foujon Mein Aye	Om Puri	N/A	3:00
Sirsa Ne Rok Litte	Sukwinder Singh	N/A	1:04
Yodhe Ajit Singh Ne	Sukwinder Singh	N/A	1:24
Eh Prem Di Galli Hai	Sukwinder Singh	N/A	1:31
Gobind Ne Laal Pyaare	Sukwinder Singh	N/A	1:19
Daadi De Naal Potey	Sukwinder Singh	N/A	1:03
Balaan Nu Neeh Udeeke	Sukwinder Singh	N/A	1:05
Nainan'Ch Ne Udeekaan	Sukwinder Singh	N/A	1:07

The title tracks are sung by Sukhwinder Singh, whilst other tracks are sung by many other various artists. "Sochte Hue Guru Aaram Karti" and "Hui Foujon Mein Aye" are narration poems by Om Puri. This track is dialogue of the movie but was chosen to be added into the soundtrack. Most music directors were kept anonymous, and the soundtrack was released through the Saga Music label

== Reception ==
=== Critical reception ===
The film received mostly positive reviews from critics for its story, animation and in-depth research. Jasmine Singh of The Tribune gave the movie 4.5 stars out of 5. He praised its story, calling it a realistic portrayal and commending the delivery of dialogue and narration by Puri. He regarded the animation quality highly especially as it was the first 3D animated Punjabi film. Shubha Shetty Saha of Mid-Day gave the film 3 stars and acclaimed the story for its sincerity but criticized the animation for its apparent lack of flexibility and expressions on the faces of characters. Jesse Brar of PunjabiReviews.com also positively reviewed the story. He complimented the film's pacing and called it realistic by showing younger sons more like children and not morally objectified. He also approved of the film for keeping the story historical and "saving itself from becoming religious propaganda." Renuka Vyavahare of The Times of India gave the film 3.5 stars. She enjoyed the film overall and recommended it for children to show them real Indian heroes.

=== Box office ===
In India, the film earned 3.5–4 crore in the first week. In the United States, the film earned ₹56.24 lakh (US$58,000) and ₹79.45 lakh (£62,000) in the UK. In total it earned ₹2.27 crore (US$240,000) at the international box office across its opening weekend.

=== DVD/Blu-ray Release ===
It is available on the DVD format and was never released on Blu-Ray.

== Sequel ==
A sequel titled Chaar Sahibzaade: Rise of Banda Singh Bahadur was released on 11 November 2016.

== See also ==
- Punjabi cinema
- List of indian animated feature films
