= Ajit Pal Mangat =

Indian film director

Ajitpal Mangat
- Born: Bhagalpur, Bihar, India
- Occupation: film director
- Years active: 2008-present

Ajitpal Mangat is an Indian film director.

== Early life ==
Mangat was born in Bhagalpur, Bihar. He is an Indian ad film maker. In 2008, he moved to Movie direction with his 1st movie "Victory".

== Film career ==
Ajitpal Mangat's latest movie was Victory (2009), a cricket-based sports film starring Harman Baweja, Amrita Rao and Anupam Kher. It was Harman Baweja's second release after his debut film Love Story 2050. He has Produced and Directed over 500 TV commercials Directed 7 TV series and TV shows.

== Filmography ==
- Indrajeet (1991) (Acted as Ajit Kumar; credited as Ajitpal)
- Khatarnaak (1990) (Acted as Yogesh Kothari; credited as Ajitpal)
- Hamari Shaadi (1990) (Actor; credited as Ajit Pal)
- Victory (2009) (Director)
