= Genelia D'Souza =

Indian actress (born 1987)

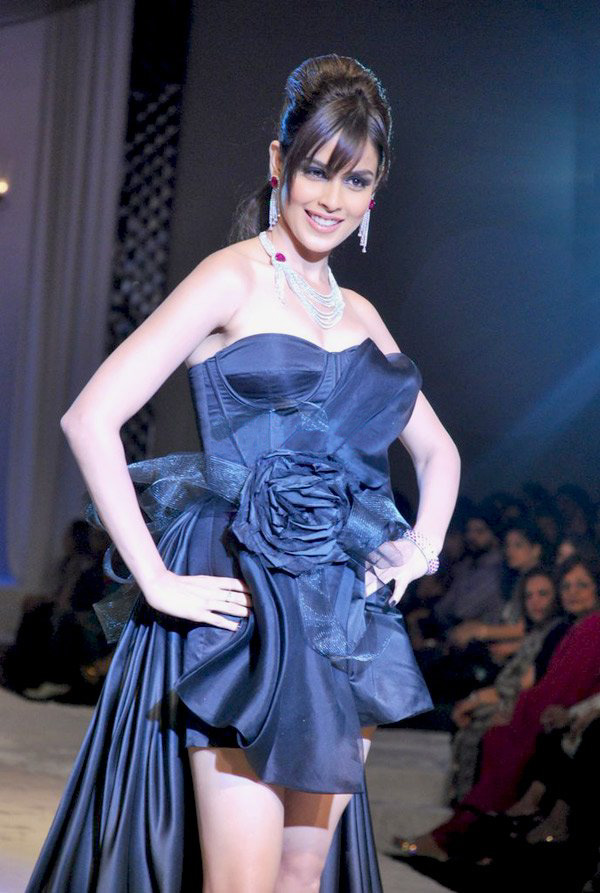
- D'Souza in 2020
- Born: Genelia D'Souza; 5 August 1987 (age 39); Bombay, Maharashtra, India
- Other names: Genelia; Genelia Deshmukh
- Occupation: Actress
- Years active: 2003–present
- Spouse: Riteish Deshmukh (m. 2012)
- Children: 2
- Family: Deshmukh (by marriage)

Genelia Deshmukh (née D'Souza; born 5 August 1987), also credited professionally as Genelia, is an Indian actress who predominantly appears in Hindi, Telugu, and Tamil films. Described in the media as one of the leading South Indian actresses of the 2000s, D'Souza is a recipient of several accolades including a Filmfare Award South and two Nandi Awards.

After gaining attention in a Parker Pen commercial with Amitabh Bachchan, D'Souza began her acting career with the Hindi film Tujhe Meri Kasam (2003), and earned recognition in the Tamil film Boys, the same year. D'Souza received the Filmfare Award for Best Actress – Telugu for portraying a bubbly girl in the romantic comedy Bommarillu (2006). She further earned praises for her portrayals in the 2008 romantic comedies Santosh Subramaniam and Jaane Tu... Ya Jaane Na. D'Souza established herself with commercially successful films—Satyam (2003), Masti (2004), Sye (2004), Sachein (2005), Happy (2006), Dhee (2007), Ready (2008), Katha (2009), Urumi (2011), Force (2011), Velayudham (2011) and Tere Naal Love Ho Gaya (2012). Her performances in Bommarillu and Katha earned her two Nandi Special Jury Award.

Following her marriage, she took a hiatus from acting. D'Souza had a career comeback with the Marathi film Ved (2022), for which she received a nomination for the Filmfare Award for Best Actress – Marathi. She further earned box office success with Sitaare Zameen Par (2025) and Raja Shivaji (2026). In addition to acting in films, D'Souza hosted the television shows Big Switch (2009) and Ladies vs Gentlemen (2020).

D'Souza is married to actor Riteish Deshmukh, with whom she has two sons. She is a celebrity endorser for several brands and products.

== Early life ==
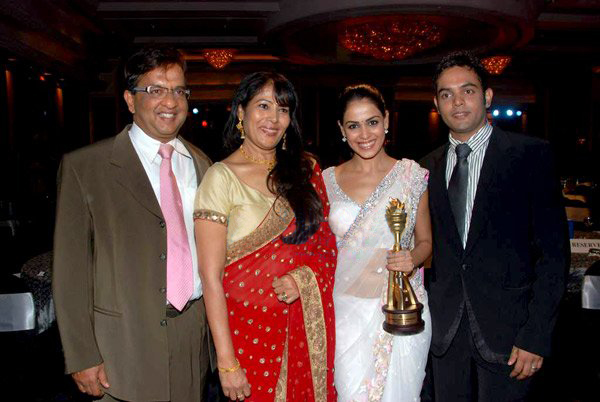
D'Souza with her family

Born in Bombay, India D'Souza is a Mangalorean Catholic. She was raised in the Bandra suburb of Bombay. Her mother, Jeanette D'Souza, was a managing director of the Pharma Multinational Corporation. She left her job in 2004 to help D'Souza with her career. Her father, Neil D'Souza, is a senior official with Tata Consultancy Services. She has a younger brother, Nigel D'Souza, who works with the Bombay Stock Exchange.

According to D'Souza, her name means "rare" or "unique", and is a portmanteau of Jeanette and Neil, her mother and father's names. She is also often informally referred to as Geenu, her nickname. D'Souza studied at the Apostolic Carmel High School in Bandra and later joined St. Andrew's College in Bandra to pursue her bachelor's degree of Management Studies. She completed her degree while shooting for her first film, Tujhe Meri Kasam in 2003 and initially thought that an MNC job would suit her. D'Souza liked sports and studies in college, and was a state level athlete, sprinter, and a national level football player.

D'Souza did her first modelling assignment at the age of 15, the result of being spotted as the bridesmaid at a wedding. She was selected for the Parker Pen commercial with Amitabh Bachchan, just two days before her exams, and had to shoot the next day. Initially, she refused, because of her exam the next day, but the director persuaded D'Souza to shoot for the commercial. She gained wide attention from the Parker Pen commercial with Amitabh Bachchan, who said "she was good, and her expressions were spontaneous". She further did a Fair & Lovely 2003 Cricket World Cup advertisement with former cricketer Krishnamachari Srikkanth.

== Career ==
=== Debut and breakthrough (2003–2005) ===
When D'Souza was offered a role in Tujhe Meri Kasam, initially she turned it down, as she was not keen to pursue a career in acting. But the crew insisted and kept contacting her for two months, and she agreed when she saw the Telugu version of the film. Tamil director, S. Shankar, was impressed with her performance in the Parker Pen commercial and decided to cast her in a leading role in his 2003 Tamil film Boys. D'Souza was selected among 300 girls, who had auditioned for the movie. She signed three movies simultaneously in three different languages, Tujhe Meri Kasam opposite Riteish Deshmukh (Hindi), Boys opposite Siddharth (Tamil), and Satyam opposite Sumanth (Telugu).

D'Souza's professional film career began with her Hindi film debut Tujhe Meri Kasam in 2003. Film critic Taran Adarsh noted, "D'Souza is a wonderful performer. She catches you unaware with a performance that's natural to the core." The film was a box–office success and earned her nomination for Screen Award for Most Promising Newcomer - Female. However, it could not do much to propel her career in Hindi cinema. Later, she decided to act in South Indian films. The same year, she made her Tamil debut as the teenage girl Harini in Boys, a story about 5 teenagers having stereotypical teen–boy fantasies. The movie, though noted for its vulgar sexual content, was a box–office success, and subsequently she started receiving Telugu film offers. She left Tamil cinema for a while to concentrate on the Telugu film industry. She made her Telugu debut in 2003 as a medical student in Satyam. Sify noted in their review that, "D'Souza is excellent as her body language is her major asset." The film was well received, and it raised her profile in the Telugu film industry. The film won her the CineMAA Award for Best Female Debut.

In 2004, D'Souza appeared in her second Hindi film, Masti opposite Riteish Deshmukh. The comedy focuses on 3 close friends who reunite after 3 years, but are now married and are being harassed by their wives. D'Souza portrayed the character of one of the wives. Taran Adarsh was complimentary of D'Souza's role, saying, "Amongst the wives, D'Souza is the best, [...] D'Souza looks the stern and demanding wife and is sure to be noticed." The film was a box–office success and she received the Stardust Award for Breakthrough Performance – Female nomination. The same year, she appeared in two Telugu movies Samba alongside Jr. NTR, and Sye opposite Nithiin, both succeeding at the box office.

After appearing in her first Telugu movie in 2005, Naa Alludu opposite Jr. NTR, she starred in the Tamil romantic entertainer Sachein opposite Vijay. A review in The Hindu noted, "D'Souza, who hardly made an impression in Boys, makes much impact in Sachein." The movie evoked mixed response from audiences, but was well received with the younger generation. She later appeared in the Telugu patriotic film Subhash Chandra Bose alongside Venkatesh, a box-office failure.

=== Critical acclaim and commercial success (2006–2010) ===
The year 2006 marked a significant turning point in D'Souza's career. She completed two Telugu movies in early 2006, one was the romantic comedy Happy opposite Allu Arjun, which was a moderate success and the other was Raam opposite Nithiin. In Happy, she played an MBBS student who marries a carefree boy, with Idlebrain stating, "Genelia has got lots of scope for performance in this film and she did exceptionally well". She then portrayed the role of Haasini, a vibrant, effervescent and a happy–go–lucky young girl, in the Telugu romantic comedy Bommarillu, reuniting with Siddharth. The film was a blockbuster at the box office, and grossed ₹250 million (US$2.7 million). Her performance received high praise, and garnered her the Filmfare Award for Best Actress – Telugu, besides the Nandi Special Jury Award. Sify concluded about her acting in their review that, "The scene stealer is D'Souza with her innocent looks and cute mannerisms. She does not overact and we just fall in love with her character. D'Souza looks like a dream in chic skirts and is the life of the party and raises the bar of the film."

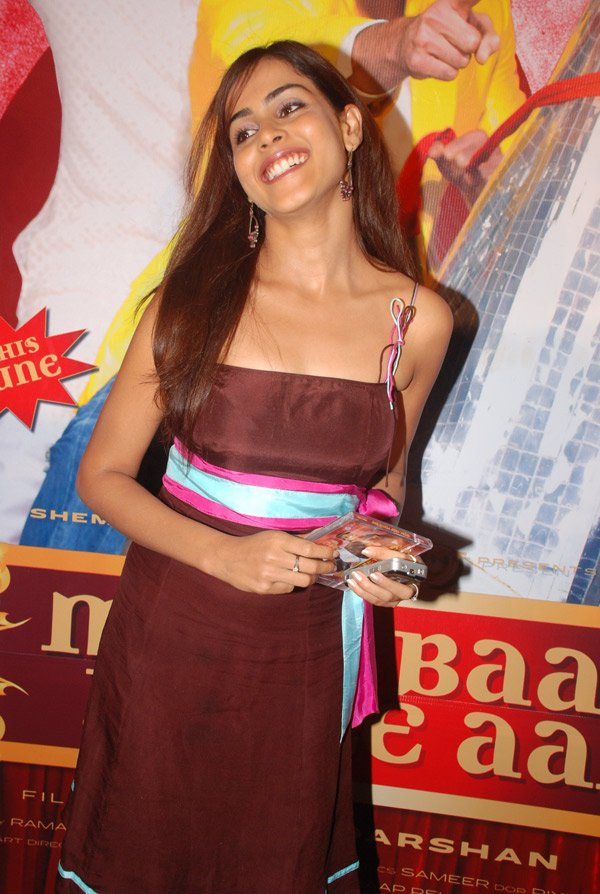
D'Souza at an event for Jaane Tu... Ya Jaane Na, in 2008

Following the success of Bommarillu, D'Souza played the role of the daughter of a local don, in the Tamil gangster film Chennai Kadhal alongside Boys co-star Bharath. Sriram Iyer from Rediff.com criticised her commenting: "D'Souza stands up yet again to prove the point that if you are pretty and well dressed, you can get away with anything, without acting." Shortly afterward, she played the role of the sister of a notorious gangster in the blockbuster Telugu film Dhee alongside Vishnu Manchu, set against a gang war backdrop. Jeevi of Idlebrain.com was appreciative of her portrayal and contribute to the film. She earned her second Filmfare Best Actress – Telugu nomination for the film.

The following year, D'Souza appeared in the Telugu romantic thriller Mr. Medhavi with Raja, in which she portrayed the role of a student from Canada. The film was successful, with Radhika Rajamani complimenting her performance saying, "D'Souza is her effervescent self – full of joie–de–vivre and lights up the screen." She made her Kannada debut in Satya in Love the same year opposite Shiva Rajkumar, which was a box-office success. Later, she was cast in a leading role in Santosh Subramaniam opposite Jayam Ravi, a Tamil remake of Bommarillu. The film turned out to be successful just like its predecessor. Sify described D'Souza's portrayal as "the soul of the film" and the film's "biggest strength", however Rediff.com's Pavithra Srinivasan described her character as "appears a little too good to be true." She received Filmfare Award for Best Actress – Tamil nomination for her performance.

In June 2008, following a nearly 5–year gap from Hindi cinema, she appeared in Mere Baap Pehle Aap alongside Akshaye Khanna, which failed to make profit at the box office. Sukanya Verma noted, "besides her apparent cuteness, brings in tons of freshness and traits to the youthful characters she chooses to play", while Sonia Chopra criticised her stating, "D'Souza is sprightly but has a standard two–three expressions bank in this film." She later appeared in the Telugu romantic comedy Ready opposite Ram Pothineni, playing an NRI girl. The film was well received and became one of the highest grossing Telugu fim of 2008. Radhika Rajamani opined that D'Souza "lights up the screen" with her performance. A critic from Sify was appreciative of her "vibrant" performance.

That year, her breakthrough performance came with the blockbuster romantic comedy-drama Jaane Tu... Ya Jaane Na, in which she portrayed the central character of a college student, Aditi opposite Imran Khan. It was a major commercial success across India and overseas, grossing ₹564 million (US$6.0 million). Her role was widely admired for her sweetness and freshness, with Raja Sen describing her acting as a "spark that has been missing in Hindi cinema for well over a decade now". While, Khalid Mohamed of Hindustan Times found her to be "consistently spontaneous". Her performance earned her several nominations including Screen Award for Best Actress and Stardust Award for Superstar of Tomorrow – Female.

In 2009, D'Souza appeared in the Telugu romantic comedy Sasirekha Parinayam alongside Tarun. The film received favourable reviews, with critics calling her "the life of the film" and praising her portrayal of emotions. She also received CineMAA Award for Best Actor – Female nomination. D'Souza then appeared opposite Fardeen Khan in the Hindi film Life Partner a box office average, where Rajeev Masand noted: "The adorable little imp from Jaane Tu... Ya Jaane Na has turned into a nagging harridan in this film, and how you wish she'd immediately enroll for acting lessons." Her next appearance was in the Telugu thriller Katha with Adith Arun, which was well received, and for which she won another Nandi Special Jury Award. A critic from Rediff.com noted, "Genelia steals the show with her tremendous screen presence. She is able to portray the 'psychological' trauma well and is really emerging as a fine actor to portray complex characters."

In 2010, D'Souza first played a choreographer opposite Shahid Kapoor in Chance Pe Dance, which received poor reviews from critics. Rajeev Masand criticised her "half-baked role". D'Souza then played a college student who believes in true love in the Telugu film Orange opposite Ram Charan, which too received poor reviews from critics, but a critic from Rediff.com praised her portrayal and chemistry with Charan. In her final film of the year, she appeared in the Tamil film Uthama Puthiran opposite Dhanush, a remake of her film Ready. The film became a moderate success. A critic from The Times of India found her getting "stereotyped" in a similar role of a bubbly girl.

=== Further success, hiatus and production (2011–2021) ===
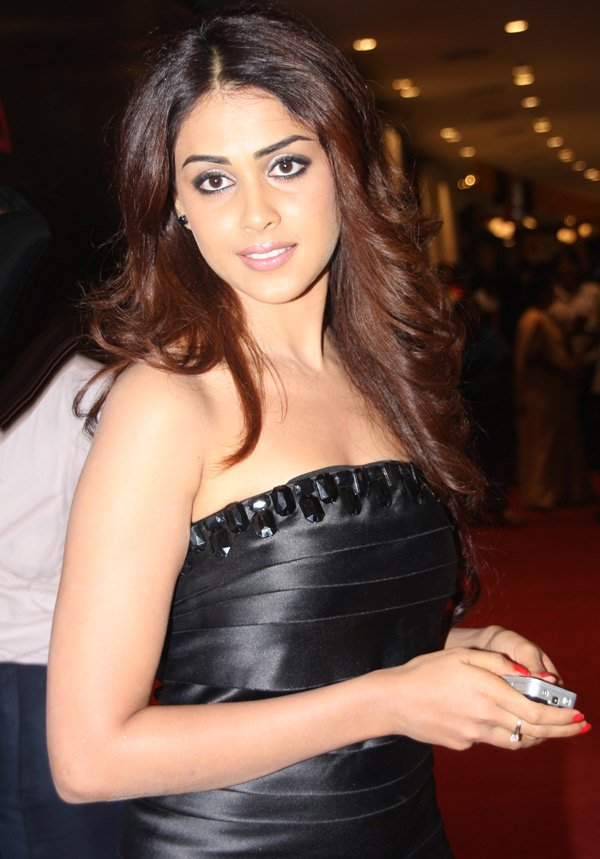
D'Souza in 2012

In her first release of 2011, D'Souza made her Malayalam film debut, starring as the Muslim warrior princess Arackal Ayesha, in Urumi alongside Prithviraj Sukumaran. The film is about a fictional story happening in Calicut, Kerala during the 15th century, about a boy who plots to assassinate the Portuguese explorer Vasco Da Gama. For her role, she learned horse riding, and spent two weeks of training to use the sword, the short stick, and movements of the Dravidian martial art, Kalarippayattu. It was a major commercial and critical success, with The New Indian Express stating: "Genelia breaks her perpetual imbecility morphing into Ayesha, the warrior princess. Her character is not reduced to the customary cheer-leader role and she claims an equal share of valour and gallantry." The film won her the Asiavision Award for Best Actress. She next played an independent woman in the Hindi film, Force opposite John Abraham, which received mixed reviews from critics but was a box office success. In his review for Bollywood Hungama, Taran Adarsh found D'Souza to be "strikingly sweet and subdued". Later, she played a journalist alongside Vijay in the Tamil film Velayudham, which was commercially successful. CNN-IBN in its review noted that D'Souza got a substantial role and fits in it "adequately".

In 2012, D'Souza first reunited with Deshmukh in the Hindi film Tere Naal Love Ho Gaya. A critic from NDTV stated that she delivers an "energetic performance" as Mini. It became a box office success. Later that year, she appeared opposite Rana Daggubati in the Telugu film, Naa Ishtam, which was a moderate success. In its review, The Times of India stated the she performs her role with "panache". Following Naa Ishtam, D'Souza took a break from full-time acting and appeared only in cameo roles in films such as the Hindi film, Jai Ho and the Marathi film, Lai Bhaari both in 2014. D'Souza with her husband Riteish Deshmukh started their production company, Mumbai Film Company and became a producer with Lai Bhaari. In 2016, she reprised her role in Force 2, a sequel of Force, appearing as the ghost of Maya. In 2018, she co-produced the Marathi film Mauli, where she also appeared in a song. In 2020, her much delayed Hindi remake of Bommarillu, It's My Life was released directly on Zee Cinema, where she appeared opposite Harman Baweja.

=== Career expansion and recognition (2022–present) ===
D'Souza changed her screen name to Genelia Deshmukh and made her comeback to full-time acting after ten years with the 2022 film, Mister Mummy opposite Riteish Deshmukh. She played a woman who finds out her husband is pregnant with their child. The film received negative reviews and failed at the box office. That year, she made her Marathi film debut with Ved, where Deshmukh played a wife whose husband is still in love with his lover, opposite Riteish Deshmukh who also directed the film. The film received positive response and emerged as the highest-grossing Marathi film of the year. Mayur Sanap opined: "Genelia has a luminous presence and conveys more with her expressions than dialogues." Deshmukh also won several accolades including a nomination for Filmfare Award for Best Actress – Marathi. Deshmukh played a single mother who orders a father for her son on a 30-day trial period, in her only film of 2023, Trial Period opposite Manav Kaul. Nandini Ramnath of Scroll.in noted: "Genelia Deshmukh turn out lovely performance, either as a make-believe couple [with Kaul] or as individual trying to do what is best for Romi."

In her first release of 2025, Deshmukh played a basketball coach's wife opposite Aamir Khan in Sitaare Zameen Par. Devesh Sharma of Filmfare noted, "Genelia brings tenderness and restraint to her role as Gulshan’s wife, but her character needed more dimension." A commercial success, the film emerged as one of the highest grossing release of the year. Following this, Deshmukh returned to Telugu and Kannada films with the bilingual film Junior, where she played a corporate boss. Sangeeta Devi Dundoo opined that tasked with emotional heft Genelia "brings maturity and restraint", despite being constrained by the plot. The film underperformed commercially.

Deshmukh began 2026 with her co-production Raja Shivaji, where she portrayed Saibai Bhonsale opposite Riteish Deshmukh. Rishabh Suri felt Deshmukh was "wonderful" in her role of Shivaji's wife. The film became a box office success and emerged as the highest-grossing Marathi film of all time. Deshmukh will next appear in Gunmaster G9 opposite Emraan Hashmi and in Police Station Mein Bhoot opposite Manoj Bajpayee.

== Personal life ==
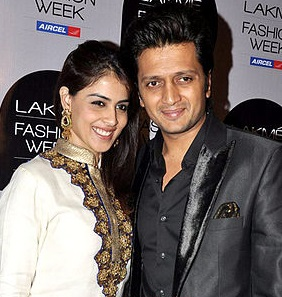
D'Souza with husband Ritesh Deshmukh at the Lakme Fashion Week 2013

D'Souza is deeply religious and says that she regularly attends Sunday Mass at St. Anne's Parish (Bandra), and whenever the family is home, a part of their evening is reserved for saying the rosary together. In an interview with The Times of India, she comments, "I keep a Novena every Wednesday at St. Michael's Church in Mahim." In an interview with Daily News and Analysis, she said, "My communication with God is conversational, [...] I'm God's favourite child; I believe that God has always been kind to me."

Tabloids repeatedly linked D'Souza romantically with Ritesh Deshmukh, ever since they starred together in their debut film Tujhe Meri Kasam in 2003. They were reportedly ready to get engaged, but Ritesh's father, the then–Maharashtra Chief Minister, Vilasrao Deshmukh did not agree. D'Souza later denied any rumours of a relationship with Deshmukh, and responds that she was just friends with him. However, the couple eventually got married on 3 February 2012, according to Marathi marriage traditions in a Hindu wedding ceremony, they had a Christian wedding in the church on next day. The couple's first child, a son named Riaan, was born on 25 November 2014. Their second son, Rahyl, was born on 1 June 2016.

== Off-screen work ==
D'Souza was a part of Tamil director Mani Ratnam's stage show, Netru, Indru, Naalai, an event which seeks to raise funds for The Banyan, a voluntary organisation which rehabilitates homeless women with mental illness in Chennai. She was one of the judges at the grand finale of Gladrags Mega Model and Manhunt 2009 contest on 28 March 2009. She also walked the ramp alongside Tushar Kapoor for fashion designer Manish Malhotra at the Lakme Fashion Week 2009 on 28 March 2009. On 5 April 2009, D'Souza was among several Hindi film celebrities to perform at the Pantaloons Femina Miss India 2009 finale in Mumbai. In October 2009, she appeared as a showstopper for jewellery designer Farah Khan Ali on the second season of Housing Development and Infrastructure Limited (HDIL) India Couture Week.

In 2009, D'Souza hosted Big Switch, a television show based on slum kids to reach a bigger audience. She unveiled Spinz Black Magic deodorant on 7 October 2009 in Mumbai, and the Ceres Store retail outlet. At the Chennai International Fashion Week (CIFW) in December 2009, she appeared as a showstopper for designer Ishita Singh's spring–summer indigenous collection of 2010. She was a part of online market portal eBay's 2010 "Dream House" challenge, where she transformed an empty three-room apartment in Bandra into an attractive home with online shopping. She had been provided a budget of ₹450,000 (US$4,800) and two weeks to create a look she wants with items on sale on the website. On the occasion of Children's Day (14 November), D'Souza auctioned a few items from the apartment. All proceeds received from the auction were given to Aseema, a Non–governmental organisation (NGO), which aims to provide education to underprivileged children. In 2021, D'Souza turned an entrepreneur and started a plant based meat brand with her husband, named "Imagine Meats".

== In the media ==
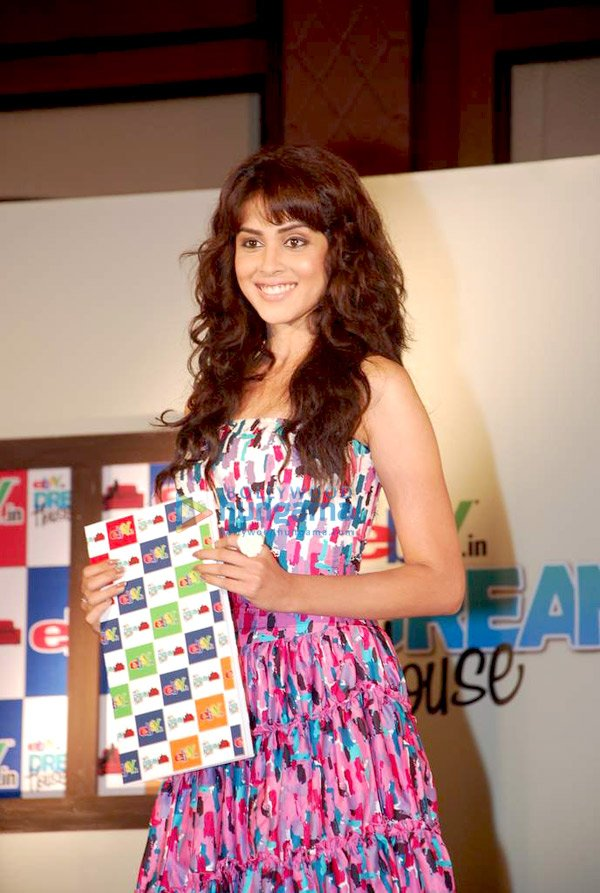
D'Souza at the eBay "Dream House" launch, in 2010

D'Souza has been considered in the media as one of the leading South Indian actresses of the 2000s. She has been often tagged by the media as the "bubbly girl", after portraying the role of a young energetic girl in several movies, particularly in Bommarillu (2006) and Jaane Tu... Ya Jaane Na (2008). D'Souza holds a Limca world record of delivering four successful [super hit] films in four different languages: Ready (Telugu), Satya in Love (Kannada), Santosh Subramaniam (Tamil) and Jaane Tu... Ya Jaane Na (Hindi), in a span of one calendar year. In Rediff.com's "Best Telugu Actresses" list, D'Souza was placed 4th in 2006, 3rd in 2007 and 1st in 2008. In 2008, D'Souza was also placed 3rd in "Best Bollywood Actresses" and 5th in "Best Tamil Actresses" list. D'Souza was placed 27th in The Times of India's "50 Beautiful Faces" list.

D'Souza appeared alongside Shahid Kapoor on the fourth episode of Tere Mere Beach Mein, a celebrity chat show, hosted by Farah Khan. The theme of the show was "Second Innings" since both D'Souza and Kapoor had the same history of failures initially and success later in their acting careers. In June 2010, D'Souza was crowned as the "Brand Ambassador of the Year" at the CNBC Awaaz consumer awards, for endorsing nine brands. She is now the brand ambassador of the soft drink Fanta (replacing Rani Mukherjee), the chocolate Perk (replacing Preity Zinta), Virgin Mobile India (along with Ranbir Kapoor), Fastrack watches and accessories, LG mobiles (along with John Abraham and Abhay Deol), Garnier Light fairness cream, Dabur Vatika hair oil, Margo soap, and Spinz deodorant.

== Controversy ==
In June 2010, a Tamil daily reported that she had attended the controversial 2010 IIFA Awards in Colombo. It is evident that a number of actors from the Hindi film industry, in conjunction with the South Indian film industry, participated in a collective refusal to attend the event in question. This decision was made in response to the alleged massacre of Tamil civilians during the conflict between the Sri Lankan Army and the Liberation Tigers of Tamil Eelam (LTTE) in 2009. The rumours of her visit to Colombo started after Ritesh Deshmukh was seen at the festival in Colombo. Immediately, various Tamil groups and Kollywood associations demanded her films to be banned.

In 2011, a controversy broke out following the release of her film Force, in a wedding sequence of herself and John Abraham. Sources claim that the wedding ceremony and rituals conducted were so authentic that had they taken one more round they would actually have become husband and wife in real life. Instead of a junior artiste, a real priest was called for the scene. Again, following reports of Ritesh Deshmukh and D'Souza's wedding plans, the priest landed at producer Vipul Amrutlal Shah's office to register a complaint. He insisted that the couple couldn't get married, as D'Souza had been already married to John Abraham, as all wedding rituals were observed, from wearing a mangalsutra (a sacred thread worn by married Indian women), to exchanging garlands and taking the seven steps around the holy fire. Shah dismissed the claims as a publicity stunt.

== Filmography ==
=== Films ===
Key
†	Denotes films that have not yet been released

Year	Title	Role	Language	Notes	Ref.
2003	Tujhe Meri Kasam	Anjali "Anju" Khanna	Hindi		
2003	Boys	Harini	Tamil	Credited as Harini	
2003	Satyam	Ankita	Telugu		
2004	Masti	Bindiya Saxena	Hindi		
2004	Samba	Sandhya	Telugu		
2004	Sye	Indu	Telugu		
2005	Naa Alludu	Gagana	Telugu		
2005	Sachein	Shalini	Tamil		
2005	Subhash Chandra Bose	Anitha	Telugu		
2006	Happy	Madhu	Telugu		
2006	Raam	Lakshmi	Telugu		
2006	Bommarillu	Hasini Rao	Telugu		
2006	Chennai Kadhal	Narmada	Tamil		
2007	Dhee	Puja	Telugu		
2008	Mr. Medhavi	Swetha	Telugu		
2008	Satya in Love	Veda	Kannada		
2008	Santosh Subramaniam	Hasini Govindan	Tamil		
2008	Mere Baap Pehle Aap	Shikha Kapur	Hindi		
2008	Ready	Puja	Telugu		
2008	Jaane Tu Ya Jaane Na	Aditi "Meow" Mahant	Hindi		
2008	King	Herself	Telugu	Cameo appearance	
2009	Sasirekha Parinayam	Sasirekha	Telugu		
2009	Life Partner	Sanjana Jugran	Hindi		
2009	Katha	Chitra Singh	Telugu		
2010	Chance Pe Dance	Tina Sharma	Hindi		
2010	Uthamaputhiran	Pooja Padmanabhan	Tamil		
2010	Orange	Jaanu	Telugu		
2011	Urumi	Ayesha/ Urmila (Note: D'Souza played dual characters in the film)	Malayalam		
2011	Force	Maya Singh	Hindi		
2011	Velayudham	Bharathi	Tamil		
2012	Tere Naal Love Ho Gaya	Mini Bhatti	Hindi		
2012	Naa Ishtam	Krishnaveni Naidu	Telugu		
2014	Jai Ho	Suman Sharma	Hindi	Cameo appearance	
2014	Lai Bhaari	Herself	Marathi	Cameo appearance	
2017	Faster Fene	—N/a	Marathi	Co-producer	
2016	Force 2	Maya Singh	Hindi	Cameo appearance	
2018	Mauli	Herself	Marathi	Cameo; also producer	
2020	It's My Life	Muskaan Mathur	Hindi		
2022	Mister Mummy	Gugloo Khote	Hindi		
2022	Ved	Shravani Shinde Jadhav	Marathi	Also producer	
2023	Trial Period	Anamaya "Ana" Roy Choudhary	Hindi		
2025	Sitaare Zameen Par	Sunita Arora	Hindi		
2025	Junior	Vijaya Soujanya	Telugu	Bilingual film	
2025	Junior	Vijaya Soujanya	Kannada	Bilingual film	
2025	Mastiii 4	Herself	Hindi	Special appearance in song "Pakad Pakad"	
2026	Raja Shivaji	Saibai Bhonsale	Marathi	Also producer	
2026	Raja Shivaji	Saibai Bhonsale	Hindi	Also producer	
2026	Gunmaaster G9 †	TBA	Hindi	Post-production	
TBA	Police Station Mein Bhoot †	TBA	Hindi	Filming	

=== Television ===
Year	Title	Role	Notes	Ref.
2009	Big Switch	Host	Season 1	
2020	Ladies vs Gentlemen	Host		

== Accolades ==
D'Souza is a recipient of several awards including a Filmfare Award South, two Nandi Awards, two International Indian Film Academy Awards and three Maharashtracha Favourite Kon? Awards.

Year	Award	Category	Work	Result	Ref.
2004	Screen Awards	Most Promising Newcomer – Female	Tujhe Meri Kasam	Nominated	
2004	CineMAA Awards	Best Female Debut	Satyam	Won	
2005	Stardust Awards	Breakthrough Performance – Female	Masti	Nominated	
2007	Nandi Awards	Special Jury – Best Actress	Bommarillu	Won	
2007	Filmfare Awards South	Best Actress – Telugu	Bommarillu	Won	
2007	Santosham Film Awards	Best Actress	Bommarillu	Won	
2008	Filmfare Awards South	Best Actress – Telugu	Dhee	Nominated	
2009	Vijay Awards	Best Actress	Santosh Subramaniam	Nominated	
2009	Vijay Awards	Favorite Heroine	Santosh Subramaniam	Nominated	
2009	Filmfare Awards South	Best Actress – Tamil	Santosh Subramaniam	Nominated	
2009	Producers Guild Film Awards	Best Actress in a Leading Role	Jaane Tu... Ya Jaane Na	Nominated	
2009	Screen Awards	Best Actress	Jaane Tu... Ya Jaane Na	Nominated	
2009	Screen Awards	Best Actress – Popular Choice	Jaane Tu... Ya Jaane Na	Nominated	
2009	Stardust Awards	Superstar of Tomorrow – Female	Jaane Tu... Ya Jaane Na	Nominated	
2010	Nandi Awards	Special Jury – Best Actress	Katha	Won	
2010	CineMAA Awards	Best Actor – Female	Sasirekha Parinayam	Nominated	
2012	Asiavision Awards	Best Actress	Urumi	Won	
2012	Screen Awards	Best Actress – Popular Choice	Force	Nominated	
2012	Stardust Awards	Best Actress in a Thriller or Action	Force	Nominated	
2012	BIG Star Entertainment Awards	Most Entertaining Actor in a Comedy Film - Female	Tere Naal Love Ho Gaya	Nominated	
2015	International Indian Film Academy Awards	Best Regional Film	Lai Bhaari	Won	
2015	Maharashtracha Favourite Kon?	Favourite Film	Lai Bhaari	Won	
2017	Maharashtracha Favourite Kon?	Favourite Film	Faster Fene	Won	
2022	Lokmat Stylish Awards	Most Stylish Power Couple (with Riteish Deshmukh)	—N/a	Won	
2023	Filmfare Awards Marathi	Best Actress – Marathi	Ved	Nominated	
2023	Maharashtracha Favourite Kon?	Favourite Film	Ved	Won	
2023	Maharashtracha Favourite Kon?	Favourite Actress	Ved	Won	
2023	Maharashtracha Favourite Kon?	Popular Face of the Year	Ved	Won	
2023	Zee Chitra Gaurav Puraskar	Best Film – Viewer's Choice	Ved	Won	
2023	Zee Chitra Gaurav Puraskar	Best Actress	Ved	Nominated	
2023	Zee Chitra Gaurav Puraskar	Favourite Actress	Ved	Nominated	
2023	International Indian Film Academy Awards	Outstanding Performance in Regional Cinema	Ved	Won	
2024	Bollywood Hungama Style Icons	Most–Loved Jodi of the Year (with Riteish Deshmukh)	—N/a	Nominated	
