= Sarcar =

Sarcar is a surname. Notable people with the surname include:

- Madhumita Sarcar
- Ugesh Sarcar
