= Vijay C Chakravarthy =

Indian film cinematographer

Vijay K. Chakravarthi
- Born: 3 October; Pattiveeranpatti, Tamil Nadu, India
- Occupation: Cinematographer

Vijay K. Chakravarthi is an Indian film cinematographer, known for his works predominantly in the Telugu cinema. He has worked for Bommarillu, Parugu, Mr. Perfect, and Nannaku Prematho.

He was nominated for the SIIMA Award for Best Cinematographer (Telugu), at the 1st SIIMA, for his work in Mr. Perfect.

== Filmography ==
Year	Film	Language
2003	Diwan	Tamil
2005	Thaka Thimi Tha	Tamil
2005	Daas	Tamil
2006	Bommarillu	Telugu
2008	Parugu	Telugu
2009	Konchem Ishtam Konchem Kashtam	Telugu
2009	Oy!	Telugu
2011	Mr. Perfect	Telugu
2011	Oh My Friend	Telugu
2012	Sarocharu	Telugu
2015	Kerintha	Telugu
2016	Nannaku Prematho	Telugu
2018	Hello Guru Prema Kosame	Telugu
2025	Jack	Telugu
