= Baweja Studios =

Indian film production company

Baweja Studios Limited
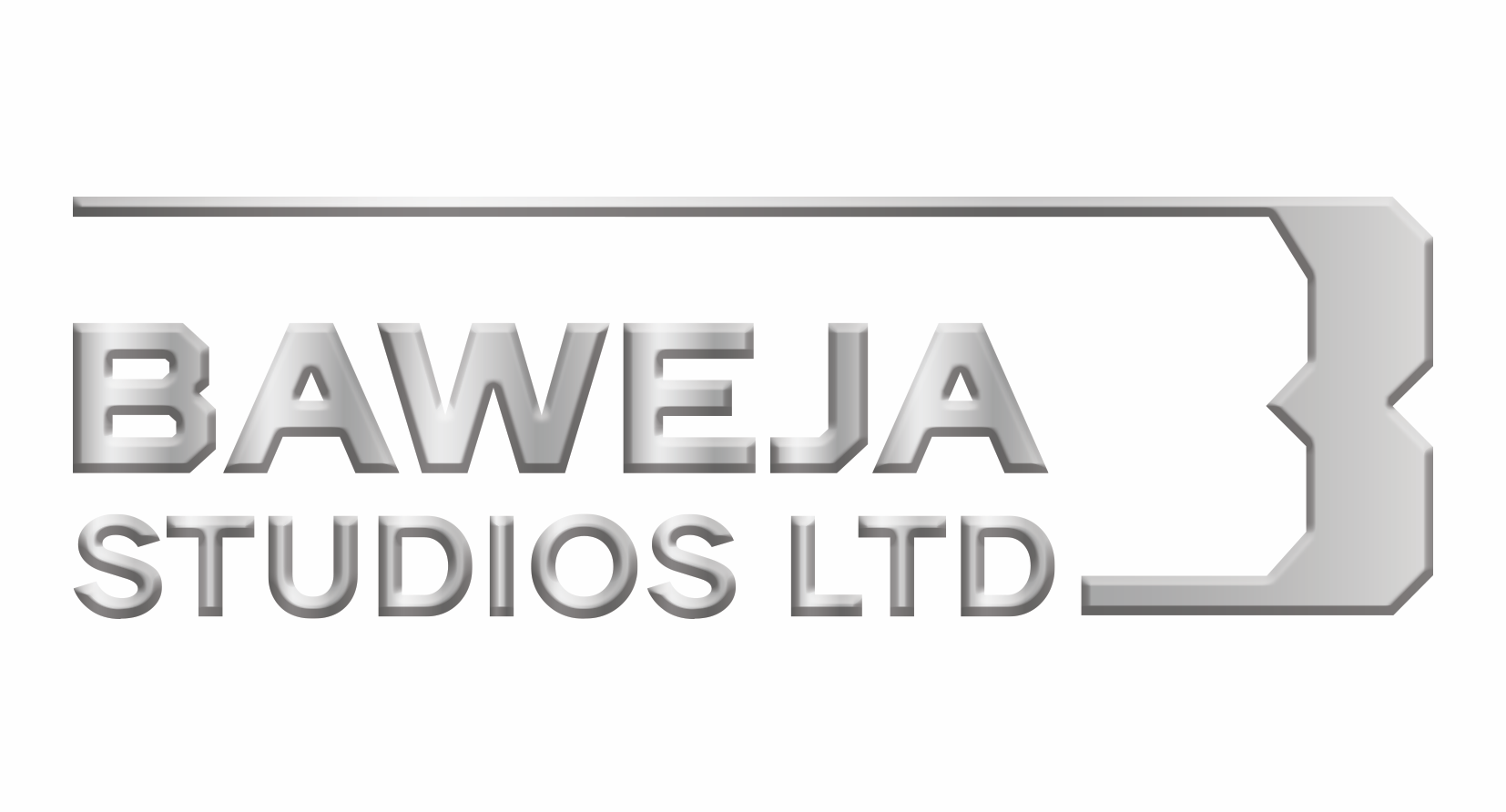
- Type: Private company
- Industry: Entertainment; Motion picture
- Founded: 1991; 35 years ago
- Headquarters: Mumbai, Maharashtra, India
- Area served: Worldwide
- Key people: Harry Baweja (founder); Paramjit Baweja; Harman Baweja (CEO)
- Products: Film production; Film distribution
- Website: www.bawejastudios.com

Baweja Studios Ltd. is a company which was formed by Harry Baweja along with his wife Pammi Baweja. Their early productions are under the banners SP Creations and Baweja Art Productions. Its first production was Trinetra (1991).

== Filmography ==
=== List of films produced ===
Film name	Year	Star Cast	Produced under
Captain India	2027	Kartik Aaryan, Parvathy Thiruvothu	Baweja Studios, T-Series Films, Midnight Chai Films
System	2026	Sonakshi Sinha, Jyothika, Ashutosh Gowariker	Baweja Studios
Haq	2025	Yami Gautam Dhar, Emraan Hashmi	Junglee Pictures, Insomnia Films
Bhagwat Chapter One: Raakshas	2025	Arshad Warsi, Jitendra Kumar, Ayesha Kaduskar	Jio Studios, Baweja Studios, Dog ‘n’ Bone Pictures
Perusu	2025	Vaibhav, Sunil Reddy, Niharika NM	Produced under Baweja Studios, Stone Bench Films and Emberlight Studio; Tamil film
Khwaabon Ka Jhamela	2024	Prateik Babbar, Sayani Gupta, Kubbra Sait	Produced under Baweja Studios and JioCinema
Mrs.	2024	Sanya Malhotra	Produced under Baweja Studios and Jio Studios
Super V	2019	Amara/Shazia, Virat/ Super V, Jo, Grand, Kulfi Kumar Bhejewala, Bunny, Nawaal	Produced under Baweja Movies
Chaar Sahibzaade	2014	Narrated by Om Puri	Produced under Baweja Movies
Love Story 2050	2009	Harman Baweja, Priyanka Chopra	Produced under Baweja Movies
Speed	2007	Zayed Khan, Urmila Matondkar, Aashish Chaudhary, Aftab Shivdasani, Sanjay Suri	Produced under Baweja Movies
Teesri Aankh	2006	Sunny Deol, Amisha Patel	Produced under Baweja Movies
Main Aisa Hi Hoon	2005	Ajay Devgan, Esha Deol, Sushmita Sen	Produced under Baweja Movies
Karam	2005	John Abraham, Priyanka Chopra	Produced under Baweja Movies
Girlfriend	2004	Isha Koppikar, Aashish Chaudhary, Amrita Arora	Produced under Baweja Movies
Qayamat: City Under Threat	2003	Ajay Devgn, Neha Dhupia, Sanjay Kapoor, Sunil Shetty, Arbaaz Khan, Isha Koppikar, Aashish Chaudhary	Produced under Baweja Movies
Yeh Kya Ho Raha Hai?	2002	Aamir Ali, Prashant Chianani, Vaibhav Jhalani, Yash Pandit	Produced under Baweja Movies
Deewane	2000	Ajay Devgn, Urmila Matondkar, Mahima Chaudhry	Produced under S. P. Creations
Betaabi	1997	Chandrachur Singh, Arshad Warsi, Anjala Zaveri, Mayuri Kango, Shadaab Khan	Produced under S. P. Creations
Diljale	1996	Ajay Devgn, Sonali Bendre, Madhoo, Amrish Puri, Gulshan Grover	Produced under S. P. Creations
Dilwale	1994	Ajay Devgn, Raveena Tandon, Sunil Shetty, Paresh Rawal	Produced under S. P. Creations
Trinetra	1991	Mithun Chakraborty, Shilpa Shirodkar, Deepa Sahi, Amrish Puri	Produced under Baweja Art Productions

=== List of films distributed ===
- Aranmanai 4 (2024); co-distributed with Kaarmic Films
- Vettaiyan (2024); co-distributed with Inbox Pictures

=== List of web series produced ===
- Bhaukaal (2020–present)
