= Katha (2009 film) =

- Directed by: Srinivas Raga
- Written by: Gangaraju Gunnam
- Produced by: Urmila Gunnam
- Starring: Genelia D'Souza; Adith Arun; Prakash Raj
- Music by: S. K. Balachandran
- Production company: Just Yellow Media
- Distributed by: Just Yellow Media
- Release date: 12 December 2009
- Country: India
- Language: Telugu

Katha (transl. Story) is a 2009 Telugu-language psychological thriller film directed by Srinivas Raga. The film stars Genelia D'Souza and Adith Arun.

== Plot ==
Chitra is a loner who comes to Araku seeking employment as a school teacher. Krishna is an aspiring director who comes to Araku for a test shoot and to complete the script of his debut film. Circle Inspector has a wife and young kids. Chitra spent a year in a mental asylum because she witnessed her family being murdered. Chitra and Krishna become friends. While Chitra is looking through her binoculars, she witnesses a murder where she can clearly see the victim's face. Chitra reports the incident to the police, but they find no evidence of the crime. Chitra suspects that her past mental condition is relapsing. Eventually, the police finds out that the female victim did, in fact, exist. They have a CD that shows Circle Inspector and the female victim together in a store. The victim is none other than the Circle Inspector's dead girlfriend's daughter. He cannot acknowledge their illegitimate relation without tainting his reputation.

It is revealed that he lured her daughter to Araku to kill her. Although Chitra witnessed the murder, the Circle Inspector tried to make it look like a figment of Chitra's imagination, and is infuriated when Chitra refuses to believe that the murder was her hallucination. Chitra and Krishna try to take the disc and escape, but Circle Inspector tries to kill Krishna, whose foot is injured by Krishna. Circle Inspector holds Krishna at gunpoint, but Chitra refuses to give the disc to him. She slaps the Circle Inspector, who decides to let go of Krishna and commits suicide. Chitra says that she did not think that Circle Inspector was going to kill her and Krishna because he already framed a dead officer for the girl's murder. Chitra and Krishna take the disc as evidence to the police. The film ends with the union of Chitra and Krishna.

== Cast ==
- Genelia D'Souza as Chitra
- Adith Arun as Krishna
- Prakash Raj as Circle Inspector
- Aamir Tameem as Raghu
- Raghu Babu as Kanakala Rao
- Shafi as Constable Raju
- Tulasi as Krishna's mother
- Shiva as Shiva
- Ravi Kiran as Kiran

== Production ==
The film began shooting on 26 April 2009 at SOS Children’s Village in Hyderabad. The film was predominately shot in Araku.

== Soundtrack ==
The music was composed by S. K. Balachandran. The audio launch was held on 19 October 2009 at State Art Gallery in Hyderabad. Several film personalities attended the event including K. Raghavendra Rao, S. S. Rajamouli, Krishna Vamsi, N. T. Rama Rao Jr., Tammareddy Bharadwaja, KL Narayana, D. Suresh Babu, M. M. Keeravani, and Rama Rajamouli.

== Reception ==
Jeevi of Idlebrain.com rated the film 2.75/5 and wrote that "We expect a better and intellectually stimulating movie from the banner of Just Yellow that produced films like Aithe and Anukokunda Oka Roju". A critic from Rediff.com wrote that "All in all, Katha is a film which will cater to a niche audience".

== Awards ==
- Genelia D'Souza : Nandi Special Jury Award for Best Performance
