= Bhagwat: Chapter One – Raakshas =

Indian Hindi-language crime thriller film

- Promotional poster
- Directed by: Akshay Shere
- Written by: Bhavini Bheda; Dialogue: Sumit Saxena
- Screenplay by: Bhavini Bheda
- Story by: Bhavini Bheda
- Produced by: Jyoti Deshpande; Pammi Baweja; Harman Baweja; Kanishk Gangwal; Akshay Shere
- Starring: Arshad Warsi; Jitendra Kumar; Devas Dikshit
- Cinematography: Amogh Deshpande
- Edited by: Hemal Kothari
- Production companies: Jio Studios; Baweja Studios; Dog 'n' Bone Pictures
- Distributed by: ZEE5
- Release date: 17 October 2025
- Country: India
- Language: Hindi

Bhagwat: Chapter One – Raakshas is a 2025 Indian Hindi-language crime thriller film directed by Akshay Shere. The film follows the investigation of a prostitution racket.

The project is produced by Jyoti Deshpande, Pammi Baweja, Harman Baweja, Kanishk Gangwal, and Akshay Shere, and is a joint production of Jio Studios, Baweja Studios, and Dog 'n' Bone Pictures. It features Arshad Warsi as Inspector Vishwas Bhagwat and Jitendra Kumar as Sameer, a professor, in lead roles, with Devas Dikshit, Tara Alisha Berry, Hemant Saini, and Ayesha Kaduskar in supporting roles.

The film's narrative has drawn comparisons to the Cyanide Mohan case. It was released on ZEE5 on 17 October 2025.

== Plot ==
The story begins in Robertsganj, Uttar Pradesh, in October 2009, with the disappearance of a young woman named Poonam Mishra. Her distraught parents report her missing, but the local police dismiss the case as an elopement because money, jewellery, and bridal clothes are also missing. One officer crudely remarks that Poonam's dark complexion made marriage prospects unlikely. A local politician fuels communal tensions by promoting a “love jihad” narrative, claiming that a Muslim man abducted her, leading to riots and protests across the town.

Police officer Bhagwat arrives amid the unrest and criticises his subordinates for failing to investigate properly, particularly by neglecting to examine Poonam's call records. He promises her father that she will be found within fifteen days and refuses to bow to political pressure. During the investigation, an officer mentions a previous case involving murdered girls supposedly sacrificed in rituals. Bhagwat reveals that his own sister was one of the victims.

The call records lead police to a labourer's number mostly used by a missing woman named Kaushalya, whose disappearance connects to several other missing women. The investigation gradually uncovers a larger pattern.

Parallel to this is the story of “Sameer” (Rajkumar), who romances a young woman named Mira. Charming and manipulative, he persuades her to fall in love with him and suggests they elope, claiming their relationship is impossible because he is Muslim. Torn between her conservative family and her feelings for him, Mira eventually agrees.

Meanwhile, Bhagwat traces another lead to Kavita Shastri, a photographer living near a red-light district. Suspecting sex trafficking, the police raid her home but find little evidence beyond two inactive phone numbers. When one becomes active again, it leads them to Rajkumar Siritiya, revealing that “Sameer” is an alias. Kavita is discovered to be one of Rajkumar's wives, alongside Sumitra. Though frightened of him, Kavita helps lure him into police custody.

Rajkumar remains calm and arrogant during interrogation. Jewellery recovered from Sumitra's house resembles that belonging to the missing women. Although Bhagwat assaults him in frustration, Rajkumar refuses to confess until he believes Sumitra has been harmed. He then admits to killing Poonam by convincing her to consume cyanide disguised as an Ayurvedic contraceptive after they had sex. Police later confirm that an unidentified body previously cremated was Poonam's.

Rajkumar casually lists other victims and compares himself to a hawk undergoing renewal, convinced he will evade conviction. Acting as his own lawyer during the trial, he manipulates witnesses and undermines testimony, including that of a cyanide supplier and a priest to whom he had confessed an earlier murder. Bhagwat grows increasingly desperate and briefly contemplates killing him.

The investigation eventually returns to Mira. Contrary to appearances, she survived because she never fully swallowed the cyanide pill Rajkumar gave her, though she fell into a coma. Having rebuilt her life with a husband and daughter, she initially refuses to testify for fear of losing everything. However, after seeing photographs of Rajkumar's victims and confessing the truth to her husband, she chooses to appear in court. Her testimony finally breaks Rajkumar's composure and seals his fate.

== Cast ==
- Arshad Warsi as DSP Vishwas Bhagwat
  - Hemant Saini as Young Bhagwat
- Jitendra Kumar as Sameer / Rajkumar / Suraj
- Devas Dikshit as Sub Inspector Mahto
- Tara Alisha Berry as Summi
- Ayesha Kaduskar as Meera
- Rashmi Rajput as Janhavi
- Akanksha Pandey as Lata Bansal
- Praveen Arora as DIG Dilip Prajapati
- Coral Bhamra as Kavita

== Marketing ==
ZEE5 and Jio Studios released the teaser and trailer of Bhagwat – Chapter 1: Raakshas in early October 2025, announcing that the film would premiere on 17 October 2025.

== Reception ==
Rahul Desai of The Hollywood Reporter India said that "Akshay Shere’s police procedural stays busy and sociopolitically alive to the India we live in today." Pritinanda Behera of India Today gave 2.5 stars out of 5 and said that "'Bhagwat Chapter 1 – Raakshas' starts with a promising premise of missing girls and a mysterious professor, but weak storytelling and predictable twists make it an underwhelming crime thriller. Arshad Warsi and Jitendra Kumar give solid performances, but the film fails to leave a lasting impact." Kabir Singh Bhandari of Free Press Journal rated it 3/5 stars and said that "If you're in the mood for a quick crime thriller and want to see Jitendra Kumar in a role he's never done before, watch Bhagwat Chapter One: Raakshas."

Aishwarya Vasudevan of OTT Play rated it 2/5 stars and stated that "Despite a compelling performance from Jitendra Kumar, whose quiet menace truly 'kills' it, the plot feels like a rerun—less a fresh hunt and more a walk-through. It lacks the 'depth' to surprise and ultimately feels like a chapter we've already 'read' before." Writing for News 18 Grace Cyril said that "weak suspense and predictable twists make it fall short of its gripping premise." Vinamra Mathur of Firstpost gave 2 stars out of 5 and commented that "Bhagwat plays it too safe, as if afraid or awkward to go all bonkers. There are scenes of sexual tension and police brutality, but the watered-down treatment dilutes all the effectiveness." Sumit Rajguru of Times Now rated it 2.5/5 stars said that "Bhagwat Chapter 1 – Raakshas is an average film that serves the audience nothing but an old wine in the same bottle. You will crave some outstanding moments but end up being disappointed with the watching experience. The two lead actors did good jobs in the performance department, but the spark remains missing from the crime thriller."

Shubhra Gupta of The Indian Express rated it 2/5 stars and said that "Almost all the moments from Vijay Varma's Dahaad show up in Arshad Warsi and Jitendra Kumar's film, making you wonder if it's a straight-up rip-off, or someone genuinely had no idea of the plot points of the show." Anuj Kumar of The Hindu observed that "Director Akshay Shere effectively calls out the social psychology that feeds the demons within, but eventually falls prey to the set designs of the serial killer formula." Ronak Kotecha of The Times of India awarded 2.5 stars out of 5 and said that "Bhagwat: Chapter One – Raakshas feels like a film with all the right intentions but half the conviction. It has flashes of brilliance but lacks the narrative sharpness and urgency required of a compelling true-crime thriller."

Nandini Ramnath of Scroll.in stated that "The 127-minute Hindi thriller eventually loses momentum, with only a few performances to savour. It’s surely a coincidence that Bhagwat shares with a popular web series the actual killer’s exact same modus operandi." Devesh Sharma of Filmfare gave 3 stars out of 5 and said that "There are important themes, caste, communalism, police brutality, but the film only glances at them before retreating into genre tropes." Bollywood Hungama rated it 2/5 stars and said that "On the whole, despite strong and intense performances by Arshad Warsi and Jitendra Kumar, BHAGWAT CHAPTER ONE: RAAKSHAS suffers from an uneven screenplay, abrupt ending, and most importantly, a striking similarity to Dahaad."
