= Trinetra =

- DVD Cover
- Directed by: Harry Baweja
- Written by: Rahi Masoom Reza (dialogues)
- Screenplay by: Dharamveer Ram
- Story by: Harry Baweja
- Produced by: Tarlochan S. Baweja
- Starring: Mithun Chakraborty; Shilpa Shirodkar; Deepa Sahi
- Cinematography: Damodar Naidu
- Edited by: Kuldip Mehan
- Music by: Anand–Milind
- Production company: Baweja Arts International
- Release date: 12 July 1991
- Country: [India
- Language: Hindi

Trinetra is a 1991 Indian Hindi-language action film directed by debutante Harry Baweja. The film stars Mithun Chakraborty, Shilpa Shirodkar, Deepa Sahi in lead roles, with Dharmendra in a special appearance.

== Plot ==
Trinetra is the story of the revenge of a son, who lost his honest father, to a group of evil minds. It is the story of a son's infinite love for his mother, who lost her husband. It is the story of a son's revenge on his father's killers.

Raja is an aspiring singer and gets a chance to sing in Dubai through Mr. Singhania. He informs his pregnant wife, Seema, and they look forward to a more prosperous life. Before that could happen, Raja finds out that Singhania is going to use him to carry drugs in his suitcase, he objects to this and is brutally killed in the presence of his wife. His wife flees the assailants and gives birth to a baby boy near the temple of Bhagwan Shri Shankar and names the boy Shiva. Unmarried and childless, Maria Fernandes sees the child and an apparently dead Seema and takes the child.

But Seema is still alive and is angered at being separated from her son. She swears to avenge Raja's death and sets about to kill the assailants one by one. She manages to kill one of them, but before she could proceed on with her gruesome task, she is arrested by the police and sentenced to jail for several years. How will Seema avenge the death of Raja? Will she escape from prison, or wait until she is withered and old after the end of her sentence?

== Cast ==
- Mithun Chakraborty as Shiva / Tony Fernandes
- Shilpa Shirodkar as Mona, Shyam and Ghanashyam's sister
- Deepa Sahi as Seema, Shiva's mother
- Kader Khan as Shyam, Mona and Ghanashyam's brother
- Shakti Kapoor as Ghanshyam, Mona and Shyam's brother
- Anupam Kher as Father Patrick
- Gulshan Grover as Gulshan
- Amrish Puri as Singhania
- Laxmikant Berde as Ajit / Amar / Akbar / Anthony (Quadruple Role)
- Anjana Mumtaz as Maria, Tony's foster mother
- Shammi as Ajit's Mother
- Guddi Maruti as Mona's Friend
- Shatrughan Sinha as Bhavishyavani
- Viju Khote as Roshanlal
- Mukri as Fight Promoter
- Chunkey Pandey as Jailor
- Mac Mohan as Mac
- Mahesh Anand as Franco
- Dan Dhanoa as Singhania's Henchman
- Manik Irani as Singhania's Goon
- Dharmendra as Raja as Shiva's father (Special Appearance)

== Soundtrack ==
Anand–Milind composed the music and Sameer penned the lyrics. The song "Main Tujhe Chhodke" sung by Kumar Sanu became very popular during the release of the film. Singers are Kumar Sanu, Amit Kumar, S. P. Balasubrahmanyam, Kavita Krishnamurthy, Sapna Mukherjee and Jolly Mukherjee.

#	Song	Singer
1.	"Main Tujhe Chhod Ke" (Part-1)	Kumar Sanu
2.	"Kehni Hai Ek Baat"	S. P. Balasubrahmanyam, Sapna Mukherjee
3.	"Aaya Main Yahan Tere Liye"	Kumar Sanu
4.	"Main Tujhe Chhodke" Part-2)	Kumar Sanu
5.	"Aaja Aaja Kya Khayega"	Jolly Mukherjee
6.	"Talk Of The Town"	Kavita Krishnamurthy
7.	"Main Tujhe Chhod Ke" (Sad-1)	Kumar Sanu
8.	"Dekhenge Dekhenge"	Amit Kumar
9.	"Main Tujhe Chhod Ke" (Sad-2)	Kumar Sanu
10.	"Meow Meow"	Kavita Krishnamurthy
