= Karz: The Burden of Truth =

2002 Indian action-drama film

- Theatrical release poster
- Directed by: Harry Baweja
- Screenplay by: Anees Bazmee
- Story by: Atul Sharma
- Produced by: Kaushal Godha
- Starring: Sunny Deol; Sunil Shetty; Shilpa Shetty; Kiron Kher
- Cinematography: Yogesh Jani
- Edited by: Kuldip Mehan
- Music by: Songs: Sanjeev–Darshan; Score: Naresh Sharma
- Production companies: Aashna Arts; Jyoti Pictures
- Distributed by: Eros International
- Release date: 6 December 2002
- Running time: 127 minutes
- Country: India
- Language: Hindi
- Budget: ₹11 crore
- Box office: ₹15.57 crore

Karz: The Burden of Truth, shortly called Karz, is a 2002 Indian Hindi-language action drama film directed by Harry Baweja and produced by Kaushal Godha. It features Sunny Deol, Suniel Shetty, Shilpa Shetty in the lead roles. Released on 6 December 2002, the film bombed at the box office.

== Plot ==
Suraj Singh is an orphan, abandoned by his biological mother for reasons unknown. Suraj Singh has grown up questioning how any mother could abandon her own child. He meets with Raja Chauhan, and after a few misunderstandings, both become fast friends. Raja Chauhan introduces him to his mom, Savitri, who welcomes and accepts him. Suraj loves Sapna and hopes to marry her someday. Unfortunately, he finds out that Raja Chauhan also loves Sapna, decides to step away, and takes to alcohol. When Savitri meets prominent politician Thakur, she recognizes him as a wanted criminal, Yograj, but Thakur denies being Yograj nor having any connection with him. This leads Suraj to wonder as to what prompted Savitri to point a finger at Yograj. His investigation will lead him to his birth mother, as well as his biological father, and he will come to know why his mother had to abandon him.

== Cast ==
- Sunny Deol as Suraj Singh
- Suniel Shetty as Raja Chauhan
- Shilpa Shetty as Sapna, Suraj’s girlfriend.
- Kiron Kher as Savitri Singh
- Ashutosh Rana as Yograj / Rajveer Thakur
- Vishwajeet Pradhan as Gogi
- Shammi as Balwant Singh's mother
- Rajeev Verma as Balwant Singh
- Sayaji Shinde as Himmat bhai
- Johnny Lever as Jugnu
- Himani Shivpuri as Jugnu's wife
- Shahbaz Khan as Inspector Khan
- Deepak Shirke as Madhav Singh

== Music and soundtrack ==
The music for the songs of the film was composed by Sanjeev–Darshan and the lyrics of the songs were penned by Sameer and Abbas. The background score of the movie was provided by Naresh Sharma.

Karz: The Burden of Truth

Soundtrack album by Sanjeev–Darshan
- Released: 9 November 2002
- Genre: Feature film soundtrack
- Label: T-Series

No.	Title	Singer(s) and Artist(s)	Length
1.	"Aashiqui Ban Ke"	Adnan Sami, Kavita Krishnamurthy, Suniel Shetty, Shilpa Shetty
2.	"Jhoom Jhoom Na"	Sukhwinder Singh, Hema Sardesai, Suniel Shetty, Shilpa Shetty
3.	"Mohabbat Hui Hai"	Kumar Sanu, Kavita Krishnamurthy, Sunny Deol, Shilpa Shetty
4.	"Meri Mehbooba Hai Tu"	Kumar Sanu, Abhijeet Bhattacharya, Suniel Shetty, Sunny Deol, Shilpa Shetty
5.	"Shaam Bhi Khoob Hai"	Kumar Sanu, Udit Narayan, Alka Yagnik, Sunny Deol, Suniel Shetty, Shilpa Shetty
6.	"So Gayi Hai Zameen" (Female)	Anuradha Paudwal, Kirron Kher
7.	"So Gayi Hai Zameen" (Male)	Kumar Sanu, Sunny Deol

== Reception ==
Taran Adarsh of IndiaFM gave the film 1.5 stars out of 5, writing ″On the whole, KARZ-THE BURDEN OF TRUTH is a typical masala fare that relies too heavily on the tried and tested stuff, thus limiting its appeal. The Idd holidays may prove beneficial to an extent, but a long run is ruled out.″ Sukanya Verma of Rediff.com wrote ″This 17-reel painfully (pun intended) lengthy film leaves you with stiff limbs and sore eyes. In a nutshell, Karz: The Burden of Truth stands true to its title.″
