= List of highest-grossing animated films in India =

This list ranks the highest-grossing animated films in India by their box office performance. It includes Indian productions as well as international animated films.

All rankings are based on Indian theatrical box office collections, where possible. For Indian animated films, both domestic and overseas gross may be included if available. Collections exclude income from home video, broadcasting rights, and merchandise.

== List ==
The list contains animated films with highest gross figures in India.

*	Denotes films still running in theatres

Rank	Film	Gross	Year	Country of Origin	Ref.
1	Mahavatar Narsimha	₹325 crore (US$35 million)	2025	India	
2	The Lion King	₹188 crore (US$26.7 million)	2019	United States	
3	Mufasa: The Lion King	₹163 crore (US$17 million)	2024	United States	
4	Demon Slayer: Kimetsu no Yaiba – The Movie: Infinity Castle	₹90 crore (US$9.6 million)	2025	Japan	
5	Spider-Man: Across the Spider-Verse	₹56.3 crore (US$6.82 million)	2023	United States	
6	Incredibles 2	₹54.5 crore (US$7.97 million)	2018	United States	
7	Frozen 2	₹54 crore (US$7.67 million)	2019	United States	
8	Kung Fu Panda 4	₹50.57 crore (US$5.4 million)	2024	United States	
9	Inside Out 2	₹38 crore (US$4.1 million)	2024	United States	
10	Moana 2	₹34.64 crore (US$3.7 million)	2024	United States	
11	Kung Fu Panda 3	₹30.8 crore (US$4.58 million)	2016	United States	
12	Kochadaiiyaan	₹30 crore (US$4.92 million)	2014	India	
13	Zootopia 2	₹29.86 crore (US$3.2 million)	2025	United States	
14	Kung Fu Panda 2	₹28.5 crore (US$6.11 million)	2011	United States	
15	Doraemon: New Nobita and the Castle of the Undersea Devil	₹28.5 crore (US$6.11 million)	2026	Japan	
16	The Adventures of Tintin	₹28.1 crore (US$6.02 million)	2011	United States	
17	The Angry Birds Movie	₹27.5 crore (US$4.09 million)	2016	United States	
18	Ice Age: Continental Drift	₹25.25 crore (US$4.73 million)	2012	United States	
19	Chaar Saahibzaade	₹24.56 crore (US$4.02 million)	2014	India	
20	Despicable Me 4	₹22.67 crore (US$2.4 million)	2024	United States	

== See also ==
- List of highest-grossing films in India
- List of highest-grossing Indian animated films
