= Satya in Love =

- DVD cover
- Directed by: Raghav Loki Marasur
- Written by: Malavalli Saikrishna (Dialogues)
- Screenplay by: Raghav Loki Marasur
- Story by: Raghav Loki Marasur
- Produced by: T. N. Ramesh
- Starring: Shiva Rajkumar; Genelia D'Souza
- Cinematography: M. R. Seenu
- Edited by: Shyam Yadav
- Music by: Gurukiran
- Production company: Ananya Enterprises
- Distributed by: Ramu Enterprises
- Release date: 28 March 2008
- Running time: 151 minutes
- Country: India
- Language: Kannada

Satya in Love is a 2008 Indian Kannada-language film directed by Raghav Loki and produced by T.N. Ramesh under Ananya Enterprises. The film features Shiva Rajkumar and Genelia D'Souza in the lead roles. The music is composed by Gurukiran.

== Plot ==
Satya falls in love with Veda when he witnesses her nursing a stranger who had a seizure. After this encounter, Veda disappears into a crowd, prompting Satya to embark on a search to find her. He learns that she lives in Kurnool with her father Ranga Reddy, who holds control in that region. Satya goes to Reddy's house but is beaten by Ranga's henchmen. Veda is surprised to see Satya as she has never seen him before. Satya, undeterred by the beating, perseveres in his quest to win Veda's affection. Despite the initial setback, he discovers a way to connect with her, determined to overcome the challenges presented by Veda's formidable father.

== Cast ==
- Shiva Rajkumar as Satya
- Genelia D'Souza as Veda
- Ramnitu Chaudhary as Roopa (special appearance)
- Vinaya Prasad as Satya's mother
- Pavithra Lokesh
- Sangeetha as Poorni
- Baby Apoorva
- Srinath as Satya's father
- Komal
- Bullet Prakash as Prakash
- Kuri Prathap
- Vijay Kashi
- Jayaprakash Reddy as Ranga Reddy, Veda's father (Telugu factionist)
- M. S. Narayana
- Subbaraju as Veda's elder brother (Telugu factionist)
- Sanjay Jayaraman
- Ajay
- Narsing Yadav
- Chatrapathi Sekhar
- Mohan Juneja as Mohan (uncredited)
- Moogu Suresh (uncredited)

== Production ==
Satya in Love is the first Kannada film to employ 4K digital intermediate technology.

== Music ==
The official soundtrack contains eight songs with one theme song. Released on 14 February 2008, Satya in Love's soundtrack was composed by Gurukiran. The lyrics were written by four different lyricists: Hrudaya Shiva, Kaviraj, V. Manohar, and Malavalli Saikrishna. The audio was released on Valentine's Day at a hotel in Bangalore.

Satya in Love

Studio album by Gurukiran
- Released: 14 February 2008 (music launch); 14 February 2008 (CD release)
- Genre: Feature film soundtrack
- Length: 41:50
- Label: Skanda Audio
- Producer: T.N.Ramesh

Gurukiran chronology
Bindaas (2008)	Satya in Love (2008)	Raa (2008)

No.	Title	Lyrics	Singer(s)	Length
1.	"Satya Is in Love (Sereyadenu)"	Hrudaya Shiva	Kumar Sanu	04:52
2.	"Nodalavalu Lovely"	V. Manohar	Gurukiran	04:48
3.	"Banda Kole Basava"	Malavalli Saikrishna	Shankar Mahadevan	04:25
4.	"Taane Tantaane"	Kaviraj	Karthik	05:30
5.	"Rama Srirama"	Kaviraj	K. S. Chithra	05:16
6.	"Romanchana"	Kaviraj	Rajesh Krishnan, Sicily	04:48
7.	"Golla Golla"	Kaviraj	Udit Narayan	04:40
8.	"Rama Srirama (Telugu)"	Kaviraj	K. S. Chithra	05:17
9.	"Theme Bit" (instrumental)			02:14

== Reception ==
The movie opened to positive reviews, receiving praise from the Deccan Herald and a rating of 2.5 out of 5 from Rediff.com. It received major criticism from viewers in Karnataka due to excessive usage of Telugu language throughout the movie.

The film opened to record-breaking collections and was the first Kannada film to simultaneously release across India in places like TN, AP, Maharashtra, Goa and Delhi.

Satya in Love grossed 4 crores in the opening weekend. The movie completed 50 days in 19 centers and 100 days in 3 cities – Bangalore, Hubli and Belgaum.
