= Tere Mere Beach Mein =

- Genre: Talk show
- Presented by: Farah Khan
- Country of origin: India
- Original language: Hindi
- No. of episodes: 15

Production
- Producer: Shah Rukh Khan
- Running time: Approx. 48 minutes
- Production company: Red Chillies Idiot Box

Original release
- Network: Star Plus
- Release: 23 August – 10 October 2009

Tere Mere Beach Mein (transl. Between you and I) is a celebrity chat show hosted by Bollywood choreographer and director Farah Khan. It premiered on Star Plus from 23 August 2009 and aired on weekends at prime time. The show ended on 10 October 2009, after completing 13 episodes. The show was produced by Shah Rukh Khan under Red Chillies Idiot Box.

== Format ==
Each episode of the show revolves around a theme. The celebrity guests invited are those who suit the theme. What sets the show apart is the last segment of the show, namely Main Hoon Na, which connects the celebrities to the common man. A common man related to the topic is also invited and given a chance to come and share his story. Some of the interesting themes have been ‘Ghar Ka beta’ featuring Bipasha Basu and Shilpa Shetty, who have been like sons to their parents. Others were like "Second Chance" featuring Shahid Kapoor and Genelia D'Souza and "Joru ka Ghulam" featuring Shahrukh Khan. The guests also receive donations for the charities they support and bring their personal belongings to be auctioned for charity.

== Celebrity guests ==
The show featured some well-known celebrities like Priyanka Chopra, Shahrukh Khan, Kareena Kapoor, Asin Thottumkal, Deepika Padukone, Irfan Pathan, Yusuf Pathan, Vijender Singh, Shahid Kapoor and several others. The first episode had Salman Khan, who appeared with his mother Sushila Charak Khan, while the last episode featured Shahrukh Khan.

Episode No.	Celebrities	Topic
1	Salman Khan and mother Sushila Charak Khan	Maa ka Ladla- ((very close to his mother))
2	Priyanka Chopra and Vijender Singh	Chote Sheher Bade Sapne ((Even though they are from small villages, they have big dreams and have accomplished it.))
3	Shilpa Shetty and Bipasha Basu	Ghar Ka Beta (( Even though they are girls, their role in the family is non less than that of a son))
4	Shahid Kapoor and Genelia D'Souza	Second Innings - Interrupted career in between or at times
5	Irfan Pathan and Yusuf Pathan	Sibling Rivalry - Siblings with same career and its impact
6	Imran Khan and Kareena Kapoor	Yeh Ishq Hai - It's all about love...
7	Ritesh Deshmukh, Vivek Oberoi and Sreesanth	Socha Na Tha - Things happened which weren't even thought about
8	Karan Johar and Sonam Kapoor	Weighty issues- Both lost tons of weights.
9	John Abraham and Yuvraj Singh	Male Eye Candy - Very hot bachelors of today.
10	Hrithik Roshan and Kangana Ranaut	Getting Over Hurdles - Had some problems in life
11	Asin Thottumkal and Deepika Padukone	Josh Jawan Hindustan Ka- Good career young age.
12	Neil Nitin Mukesh and Abhay Deol	Freedom- Were free through childhood.
13	Shahrukh Khan	Joru ka Ghulam- his personality and his life.

== Impact ==
Iqbal Pasha reunited with his family after eight years after he appeared as an audience in the show where he shared his past of being lost from his parents and got identified and united through this show.
