= Big Switch =

- Country of origin: India
- No. of seasons: 4

Production
- Running time: ~43 minutes
- Production companies: UTV Television (season 1-3); Contiloe Entertainment (season 4)

Original release
- Network: Bindass
- Release: 18 December 2009 – 10 September 2015

Big Switch is an Indian television reality series which aired on Bindass. It featured very rich children, who were required to carry out various tasks designed to make them understand the value of money.

The first season, which was hosted by Genelia D'Souza and broadcast in 2009, had ten participants from different parts of India, each of whom was paired with a child from a slum area. The participants had to live in the slums, trying to fulfill the wishes of their partner.

In the second season, hosted by Gaurav Kapoor, the participating children switched parents, and in the third season, the host Rohit Shetty acted as a mentor to the participants. The fourth season, broadcast in 2013, involved three teams of children, who had to live in tents and earn money for themselves. The Folha de São Paulo considered that the series reflected the struggle against poverty in India.
