= Bindass =

Defunct Hindi television channel in India (2007-2025)

- Type: Television channel
- Country: India
- Headquarters: Mumbai, India

Programming
- Language: Hindi
- Picture format: 720p SDTV

Ownership
- Owner: Disney Star
- Sister channels: Disney Star channels

History
- Launched: 24 September 2007; 18 years ago
- Closed: 15 March 2025; 16 months ago
- Former names: UTV Bindass (2007-2012)

Bindass was an Indian Hindi language music pay television channel owned by Disney Star. Originally launched as a youth channel, it was a more dedicated music channel. Bindass was discontinued on 15 March 2025.

== History ==
UTV Software Communications launched Bindass as a youth-oriented entertainment channel on 24 September 2007 along with movie channel Bindass Movies (which was later rebranded as UTV Action in 2010). Initial programming consisted of a sitcoms Sun Yaar Chill Maar and Lagegi, action series Shakira - The End of Evil, 3rd Degree with Ugesh Sarcar and six international shows The Benny Hill Show, Japanese Pro Wrestling Show, Gotcha, Motorrad Cops, Whacked Out Sports and Challenges of Fire.

In February 2010, Bindass launched a new campaign titled "What I Am" which aimed at speaking for the youth of India, and dispel popular misconceptions about their attitude towards responsibilities.

The Walt Disney Company acquired UTV in 2012 and Bindass along with other UTV channels became part of Disney India Media Networks.

In 2016, Disney Media Networks India started producing Web television series which will be simulcast on Bindass as well digital platforms like Facebook and YouTube. The first series under this multi-platform strategy was The Girl in the City which was followed by The Trip, Girl in the City Chapter 2, Dil Buffering and Tere Liye Bro.

In 2017, Disney India closed Bindass Play, a music channel and its content was merged with Bindass.

In 2025, it was announced that Bindass, along with 8 other channels would be discontinued on 15 March 2025.

=== Bindass India concert ===
On 13 January 2008, Bindass presented a two-hour live concert starring Shah Rukh Khan at MMRDA Grounds, Mumbai. The entourage included stars Priyanka Chopra, Dia Mirza, Rakhi Sawant and Dino Morea. The concert was hosted by Sajid Khan, and choreographed by Ganesh Hegde.

Prior to the contest Bindass organized a nationwide contest called "Dance with SRK", where the lucky winners would get to dance with Shah Rukh Khan on stage. Through a lucky dip, three winners, Andrew from Kolkata, Richa from Lucknow and 9 year old Vidhi from Mumbai, were chosen. The concert was telecast on Bindass on 26 January 2008 on Indian Republic Day.

== Programming ==
- 3rd Degree With Ugesh Sarcar (2007–2009)
- Beg Borrow Steal (2011–2017)
- The Benny Hill Show (2007–2008)
- Big Switch (2009–2015)
- Cash Cab - Meter Chalu Hai (2008–2010)
- The Chair (2010)
- Challenges Of Fire (2007–2008)
- Change Aayega Hum Laayenge (2014)
- Dadagiri (2008–2011)
- Destination Love (2010)
- Dil Buffering (2017)
- Emotional Atyachar (2009–2015)
- Fear Less (2012)
- Halla Bol (2015)
- Hass Ley India (2007–2008)
- Girl In The City (2016)
- Girl In The City: Chapter 2 (2017)
- Girl In The City: Chapter 3 (2018)
- Ishq Messenger (2017–2021)
- Japanese Wrestling Show (2007–2008)
- The Khan Sisters (2011–2013)
- Kiss Kiss Bang Bang (2008)
- Kota Toppers (2015–2016)
- Lagegi (2007)
- Life Lafde Aur Bandiyan (2016)
- Live Out Loud - It’s Now Or Never (2012)
- Love By Chance (2014–2015)
- Love Lock Up (2011)
- Meri Toh Lag Gayi.... Naukri (2011)
- Motorrad Cops (2007–2008)
- Pyar Ka The End (2014)
- Road Diaries (2016)
- Selfie Wala Show (2017–2021)
- Shakira - The End Of Evil (2007–2008)
- Sun Yaar Chill Maar (2007–2008)
- Sun Yaar Try Maar (2015)
- Surprise Surprise Gotcha (2007–2008)
- Superdude (2011–2013)
- Tere Liye Bro (2017–2018)
- Tia's Request Show (2017–2021)
- The Trip (2016–2018)
- Tu Con Main Con (2015)
- Whacked Out Sports (2007–2008)
- Yeh Hai Aashiqui (2013–2016)
- Zabaan Sambhalke (2007–2008)
- Zindagi Wins (2015)
