= Ugesh Sarcar =

Indian illusionist and mentalist

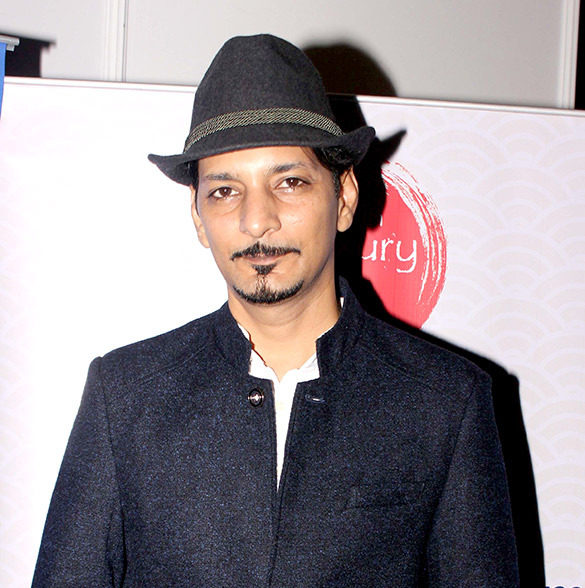
- Sarcar in 2017
- Occupation: Magician

Ugesh Sarcar is an Indian illusionist, mentalist, and author. He is known for his work in street magic and for hosting the television show 3rd Degree. Sarcar describes himself as a "mystician" rather than a magician. In 2025, he released his first book, What Matters: Volume One – Credibility.

== Early life ==
Sarcar was born and brought up in Bangalore to a Punjabi Rajput family. He is the son of M.C. Sarcar, a magician and the founder of the Karnataka Magic Academy Trust. He was introduced to magic at the age of eight and began training under his father.

Sarcar is a school dropout. Before pursuing magic professionally, he worked various jobs, including stints in call centres and marketing. He has stated that these jobs helped him understand human psychology, which he later applied to his performances. Prior to his public debut, he practiced for 18 hours a day and isolated himself for three years to prepare. He cites his father and David Copperfield as his favorite magicians.

== Career ==
=== Television and film ===
Sarcar gained prominence with his show 3rd Degree, which aired on the channel UTV Bindass. The show featured Sarcar performing impromptu street magic on strangers without a script or camera tricks. Acts included bending cutlery with his gaze and reading minds.

In 2015, Sarcar anchored a television show titled Asambhav Sambhav. The show was designed to include humour and magic acts performed on Bollywood celebrities.

Sarcar also worked as the technical director for magic on the film Guzaarish.

=== Live performances ===
Sarcar has performed stage shows such as Your Mind is Mine. This theatre-style show focused on mentalism, levitation, and the demonstration of "spirits". Directed by Shakir Khan, the show was intended to be experiential, with Sarcar attempting to influence the minds of the audience. He has expressed a desire to move away from traditional magic clichés, such as slicing a woman in half, preferring acts that manipulate the mind.

=== Writing ===
In September 2025, Sarcar launched his book What Matters: Volume One – Credibility. The book is described as a guide to "being human" and involves a narrative about an invitation-only college where students undergo experiments to dismantle their self-perceptions.
