= Victory (2009 film) =

- Theatrical release poster
- Directed by: Ajit Pal Mangat
- Written by: Ajit Pal Mangat; Kannan Iyer; Darab Farooqui
- Produced by: Manmohan Shetty; Ajit Pal Mangat
- Starring: Harman Baweja; Amrita Rao; Anupam Kher
- Cinematography: Attar Singh Saini
- Edited by: Ballu Saluja
- Music by: Anu Malik
- Production company: Victory Motion Pictures
- Release date: 30 January 2009
- Running time: 159 minutes
- Country: India
- Language: Hindi
- Budget: ₹19 crore
- Box office: ₹1.92 crore

Victory is a 2009 Indian Hindi-language sports film directed and written by Ajit Pal Mangat. The film stars Harman Baweja, Amrita Rao and Anupam Kher. Victory tells the story of a struggling cricketer who defies all odds to realise an almost impossible dream.

== Plot ==
The film follows the lives of Vijay Rawat and his father, Ram Shekhawat. Vijay's ambition to represent India in international cricket. Ram has high hopes for his son, who dreams of one day playing for the Indian national cricket team. Vijay eventually fulfils his ambition by earning a place in the national side. Throughout his journey, he is supported by his childhood friend Nandini, who has believed in his cricketing potential since he first expressed his interest in the sport.

However, Vijay's success proves short-lived when he allows his newfound fame to affect his behaviour, resulting in him losing his place in the national team and the respect he had previously earned. He subsequently experiences the harsh treatment of the media and public, who turn against him following his fall from prominence. Unable to cope with the humiliation surrounding his son's downfall, Ram suffers a brain haemorrhage.

Nandini takes responsibility for caring for Ram and supporting Vijay during this difficult period. Vijay and Nandini subsequently travel to Australia for surgery on Vijay's back, which is successful. During their time together, Vijay begins to develop romantic feelings for Nandini, recognising her as a potential life partner. However, Nandini remains emotionally affected by Vijay's previous behaviour and struggles to trust him again.

Upon returning to Jaisalmer, Vijay resolves to rebuild his cricketing career and regain the trust of those around him. Determined to prove himself to Ram and Nandini, he works towards becoming a better cricketer, earning the confidence of his coach in the process. His efforts eventually lead to his selection for a major international cricket tournament. Despite sustaining an injury during the competition, Vijay remains determined to continue playing and help his team secure victory. He ultimately wins the tournament and returns to Jaisalmer.

Upon his return, Vijay reconciles with Ram, bringing their strained relationship to an end. However, shortly afterwards, Ram dies in Vijay's arms. Following his funeral, Vijay and Nandini find comfort in each other's company, suggesting the possibility of a future relationship. The film concludes with Vijay returning to the cricket field to represent India once again.

== Cast ==
- Harman Baweja as Vijay Shekhawat
- Amrita Rao as Nandini
- Anupam Kher as Ram Shekhawat, Vijay's father
- Dalip Tahil as Dilip Malhotra, Indian Cricket Team coach
- Gulshan Grover as Andy Singh
- Smita Hai as Shakuntala
- Dipti Mehta as Gauri
- Arun Bakshi as Chander
- Anupam Manav as Chuktu
- Tinnu Anand as Vedpal

=== Cameo appearances ===
Several cricketers made cameo appearances as themselves.

- Mohinder Amarnath
- Rao Iftikhar Anjum
- Allan Border
- Stuart Clark
- Martin Crowe
- Dilhara Fernando
- Brad Haddin
- Brad Hogg
- Mike Hussey
- Sanath Jayasuriya
- Dean Jones
- Simon Jones
- Suresh Raina
- Rohit Sharma
- Virat Kohli
- Dinesh Karthik
- Praveen Kumar
- Brett Lee
- Farveez Maharoof
- Sajid Mahmood
- Shoaib Malik
- Dimitri Mascarenhas
- Ajantha Mendis
- Albie Morkel
- Morné Morkel
- Muttiah Muralitharan
- Ashish Nehra
- André Nel
- Yusuf Pathan
- Ramesh Powar
- Kumar Sangakkara
- Ishant Sharma
- Navjot Singh Sidhu
- Harbhajan Singh
- Maninder Singh
- RP Singh
- Michael Slater
- Graeme Smith
- Pat Symcox
- Sohail Tanvir
- Chaminda Vaas
- Atul Wassan
- Waqar Younis
- AB De Villiers

== Soundtrack ==
The music of the film was composed by Anu Malik, with lyrics written by Syed Gulrez.

#	Title	Singer(s)	Length
1	"Aisa Toh Socha Na Tha"	Hariharan	2:01
2	"Balla Utha Chhakka Laga"	Parthiv Gohil	2:17
3	"Mazaa Aa Gaya"	Shankar Mahadevan, Suresh Wadkar, K.S Chithra, Kumar Sanu, Srinivas, Sadhana Sargam	1:36
4	"Money Money Money Show Me The Money"	Mahesh Kale, Rekha Bharadwaj	2:03
5	"Tu Ne Re"	Javed Ali	1:48
6	"Victory"	Mame Khan	1:46
7	"We Love Kirket"	Kailash Kher	2:26

== Reception ==
Shubhra Gupta of The Indian Express wrote, "Victory has all the right intentions, but its execution is bland." Taran Adarsh of Bollywood Hungama gave the film 2 out of 5, writing, "On the whole, Victory is a strictly average fare. Barring a few moments in the second hour, there's not much that you carry home."
