= Love Story 2050 =

2008 Indian film by Harry Baweja

- Poster
- Directed by: Harry Baweja
- Screenplay by: Harry Baweja
- Dialogues by: Mayur Puri
- Produced by: Pammi Baweja
- Starring: Harman Baweja; Priyanka Chopra; Boman Irani; Archana Puran Singh
- Cinematography: Kiran Deohans
- Edited by: Hemal Kothari
- Music by: Anu Malik
- Production company: Baweja Movies
- Distributed by: Adlabs
- Release date: 4 July 2008
- Running time: 180 minutes
- Country: India
- Language: Hindi
- Budget: ₹40 crore
- Box office: ₹180.47 crore

Love Story 2050 is a 2008 Indian Hindi-language science fiction-fantasy romance film directed by Harry Baweja and produced by Pammi Baweja. The film stars Harman Baweja, and Priyanka Chopra. It is the first Bollywood film on utopian time travel.

The film premiered was on 2 July 2008 in London, and was released in India 4 July 2008. It was a commercial failure at the box-office.

== Plot ==
Karan Malhotra is a spirited and happy-go-lucky boy who does not follow the rules. Sana is the opposite of Karan: a sweet and shy girl who lives life by the rules. Even though they are completely opposite, they fall in love, leading to a magical love story.

A scientist, Dr. Yatinder Khanna, has dedicated 15 years of his life to building a time machine. Sana expresses a wish to time-travel to Mumbai in the year 2050, but she is killed in an accident before her marriage to Karan. Karan wishes to travel back in time and find Sana. Dr. Yatinder, Karan, and Sana's siblings, Rahul and Thea, travel forward in time and reach Mumbai in 2050. They are fascinated by the futuristic Mumbai, with its flying cars, holograms, robots, 200-story buildings and more.

Twists and turns lead to the introduction of Ziesha, the reincarnation of Sana. Ziesha is a popular singer in 2050 who does not remember her past life, but gets flashbacks of it after meeting Karan. Unlike Sana, Ziesha is an arrogant, headstrong and rebellious girl who does not believe in love. She leads a lonely life after the death of her parents, which has embittered her.

Karan and the others find themselves under the threat of the demi-god, Dr. Hoshi. After Karan tells Ziesha he loves her, he is taken away from her by the guards. Ziesha does not believe him when he tells her about his time travel. However, after reading Sana's diary, Ziesha ultimately remembers her past life. Karan returns to her and she declares her love for him and tells him she is Sana. Dr. Hoshi tries to capture Karan because he wants the time machine. After a wild attempt to catch Karan and Ziesha, Hoshi crashes into a nuclear substance truck and dies. Karan goes back to 2008 in the time machine with Ziesha and the rest of his family. Everyone is overjoyed to see their beloved Sana again, and Karan proposes to her.

== Cast ==
- Priyanka Chopra as Sana Bedi / Zeisha (dual role)
- Harman Baweja as Karan Malhotra
- Boman Irani as Professor Yatinder Khanna "Uncle Ya"
- Aman Batala as Rahul Bedi, Sana's younger brother
- Archana Puran Singh as Mrs. Bedi, Sana's mother
- Shishir Sharma as Vishal Bedi, Sana's father.
- Dalip Tahil as Ravi Malhotra, Karan's father (special appearance)
- Kurush Deboo as Hacker Jimmy Dhinchuck
- Karan Veer Mehra as Karan's friend
- Harsh Vashishth as Karan's friend
- Mehezabeen Sarela as Sheena, Sana's friend

== Production ==
Initially, when Love Story 2050 was announced in 2004, Kareena Kapoor had initially signed on to play the female lead, for which she was reportedly paid ₹3 crores. Kapoor later opted out in 2006, due to date and scheduling issues, and was replaced by Priyanka Chopra. The film was Hindi cinema's first attempt at making a utopian futuristic film and had 1200 special effect shots. The production budget of ₹60 crores was deemed as an extremely high gamble and risk, for a new genre at that time.

The film draws on the story of the 1991 Telugu film Aditya 369; while the Telugu film deals with travel to the past as well as dystopian post-apocalyptic future, Love Story 2050 is exclusively about travelling to a utopian future-city of Mumbai in the year 2050. It is Bollywood's first utopian time travel film.

Some parts were filmed in Adelaide, South Australia. Kaurna educator, cultural adviser, and dancer Jack Buckskin performed in the film with Taikurtinna, an Aboriginal dance group.

The special effects were executed by four international firms. Two special effects houses – Weta Workshop (New Zealand) and John Cox (Brisbane, Australia) – have won an Academy Award for their work on international projects.

Along with Harman and Priyanka, a robot was seen playing a major role; viewers also get to see a teddy bear, which appears to be more than a toy.

Priyanka Chopra played a dual role, for which, she had to color her hair twice, once red to portray the girl from the future and then black. The red-haired look was inspired from Baweja's sister, Rowena Baweja's painting, which portrayed women of today and tomorrow. The script of Love Story 2050 inspired her to do the painting.

The first trailer of the film was shown on 21 March 2008 at the premiere of Race.

It is Bollywood's first utopian time travel film.

== Soundtrack ==
Love Story 2050

Studio album by Anu Malik
- Released: 12 April 2008 (Digital Release); 4 July 2008 (Film)
- Genre: Feature film soundtrack
- Length: 45:00
- Label: Big Music

The music was composed by Anu Malik, with lyrics written by Javed Akhtar. While the movie sank, the song "Milo Na Milo" was a hit.

Song	Singer(s)	Notes	Duration
"Aa Gaya Hun Mein"	KK	Not picturised in the film	6:27
"Mausam Achanak Ye Badla Kyun"	Shaan, Alka Yagnik	Picturised on Harman Baweja and Priyanka Chopra	5:55
"Milo Na Milo"	Shaan	Picturised on Harman Baweja and Priyanka Chopra	6:07
"Sach Kehna"	Kunal Ganjawala	Picturised on Harman Baweja and Priyanka Chopra	6:16
"Jane Kaisi Hai Teri Meri Love Story" (Happy Version)	Shaan	Picturised on Harman Baweja and Priyanka Chopra	4:48
"Jane Kaisi Hai Teri Meri Love Story" (Sad Version)	Shaan	Picturised on Harman Baweja and Priyanka Chopra	3:22
"Lover Boy"	Alisha Chinai	Picturised on Harman Baweja and Priyanka Chopra	6:39
"Meelon Ka Jaisa Tha Fasla" (Happy Version)	KK, Alka Yagnik	Picturised on Harman Baweja and Priyanka Chopra	6:15
"Meelon Ka Jaisa Tha Fasla" (Sad Version)	KK, Alka Yagnik	Picturised on Harman Baweja and Priyanka Chopra	3:26

== Release ==
Initially the film was supposed to release on 21 December 2007 but it got postponed to 4 July 2008 due to extensive post-production work. The premiere was held on 2 July 2008 in London.

The film was distributed by Adlabs. It was released on 4 July 2008 with over 540 prints (including 200 digital screens) and approximately 200 prints overseas.

== Reception ==
Taran Adarsh of Indiatimes called Harman the new flavour of the season and someone who will have a long stay in Bollywood.

Raja Sen of Rediff.com called the movie "absolutely ridiculous" with "nothing to offer". In reference to Harman Baweja, Sen said "He cannot act. He does not look good. He does not have screen presence".

It was a critical failure with many adding it on their worst movies lists as well as Priyanka and Harman's "worst film" lists. However, an academic article published in 2017 stated that the film's utopian version of Mumbai helps "understand the cultural anxieties about India’s neoliberal future".

== Awards ==
- The film won the award for Best Special Effects at 54th Filmfare Awards.

== Box office ==
Love Story 2050 opened to a 25% response and, by noon shows, was in the 35%–40% range. In multiplexes, it opened to a 50%–60% response on Friday. The film was released on 725 cinemas including 350 digital cinemas.

== Video game ==
Rocking Pixels developed a game based on the film. The game was to be released sometime in July 2008 by Zapak.

== See also ==
- Science fiction films in India
