= Mahavatar Narsimha =

2025 Indian animated film by Ashwin Kumar

- Theatrical release poster
- Directed by: Ashwin Kumar
- Written by: Jayapurna Das; Ashwin Kumar
- Based on: Narasimha Purana; Vishnu Purana; Srimad Bhagavata Purana
- Produced by: Shilpaa Dhawan; Kushal Desai; Chaitanya Desai
- Edited by: Ashwin Kumar; Ajay Varma
- Music by: Sam C. S.
- Production companies: Kleem Productions; Hombale Films (presenters only)
- Distributed by: See below
- Release dates: 25 November 2024 (IFFI); 25 July 2025 (India)
- Running time: 131 minutes (theatrical); 141 minutes (IFFI)
- Country: India
- Languages: Hindi; Kannada; Tamil; Telugu (Note: The film has lip-sync in these four languages, as stated by the makers, and the CBFC certificates also indicate that these are not dubbed versions.)
- Budget: ₹20 crore
- Box office: ₹300–325 crore (Note: Mahavatar Narsimha's reported worldwide grosses vary between ₹300 crore (Hindustan Times, Cinema Express, News18) – ₹325 crore (DNA India, The Economic Times))

Mahavatar Narsimha is a 2024 (Note: The film premiered at the 55th International Film Festival of India in November 2024 and was released theatrically in July 2025.) Indian animated epic mythological action film directed by Ashwin Kumar in his directorial debut, written by Jayapurna Das and produced by Kleem Productions. Presented by Hombale Films, the film is the first installment in the planned seven-part animated Mahavatar Cinematic Universe, based on the ten avatars (incarnations) of Vishnu.

The film chronicles two avatars of Vishnu, Varaha and Narasimha. Varaha, a mighty boar, rescues Bhudevi (Mother Earth) from the asura (demon) Hiranyaksha. The story then shifts to the demon Hiranyakashipu, Hiranyaksha's brother, who gains a boon from Brahma, declares himself god, and oppresses Vishnu's followers. Vishnu appears as Narsimha, a half-lion man form, who kills Hiranyakashipu while honoring the conditions of the demon's boon from Brahma. Blending two major episodes from the Dashavatara, Mahavatar Narsimha explores themes of divine justice, faith, and the promise of protection to the righteous.

The soundtrack and background score were composed by Sam C. S., with editing handled by Ajay Varma and director Ashwin Kumar himself.

Mahavatar Narsimha was premiered on 25 November 2024 at the 55th International Film Festival of India and was theatrically released on 25 July 2025 in 2D and 3D formats. The film received generally positive reviews from critics and audiences, who praised the direction, visuals, screenplay, music, animation and acting but criticized its graphic violence which was deemed too violent in the animation genre and for kids. It performed extremely well in the Hindi version. Estimates of its worldwide box office gross range from ₹300 crore (equivalent to ₹310 crore or US$33 million in 2026) to ₹325 crore (equivalent to ₹336 crore or US$36 million in 2026). It is the seventh highest-grossing Indian film of 2025. It emerged as the highest-grossing Indian animated film, surpassing Kochadaiiyaan (2014), and also the highest-grossing animated film in India, surpassing The Lion King (2019).

== Plot ==
While Sage Kashyapa was meditating, Kamadeva shot an arrow into Diti's heart, thus making her blissful and desperate. Sage Kashyapa is approached by Diti for children, to which Kashyapa protests that it is an inauspicious hour when demonic entities, along with their master, Shiva, roam the skies. However, Diti remains stubborn, and Kashyapa reluctantly agrees. However, the next morning, Kashyapa tell Diti that since she approached him during an inauspicious hour, she shall give birth to two ferocious demons who shall provoke enmity with the gods, terrorise their devotees, and eventually be slain by Vishnu himself when their sins reach their height, much to Diti's distress. As prophesied by Kashyapa, Diti ends up giving birth to two demonic sons, Hiranyakashipu and Hiranyaksha, who are later instructed under the guidance of Shukra, the guru of demons.

The younger brother, Hiranyaksha, kidnaps Bhumi and imprisons her under the Causal Ocean to provoke Vishnu, throwing the world into chaos. The deities desperately seek Vishnu's assistance, to which Vishnu subsequently takes the form of Varaha, a colossal, divine boar, who emerged from Brahma's nostrils, and engages Hiranyaksha in battle. Varaha rescues Bhudevi and kills Hiranyaksha in the subsequent duel.

Hiranyakashipu attacks Vishnu's devotees and retreats into the Himalayas for deep tapasya in order to obtain a boon of his choice from Brahma to be able to deal with Vishnu. His severe penance starts to burn the universe, forcing Brahma to appear before him and grant him his boon, which is that he cannot be slain by any creation of Brahma, be it a god, man or beast, during the day or at night, indoors or outdoors, on land or in the sky, by any animate or inanimate object, by any weapon or by hand. Hiranyakashipu then declares war on the gods, conquers their realms, and proclaims himself "God of the Universe."

Indra abducts Hiranyakashipu's pregnant wife, Kayadhu. However, Narada intervenes as a guru and advises Indra to uphold dharma even in times of adversity. Narada then offers shelter to Kayadhu in his ashram and instructs her in the path of devotion to Vishnu, teachings which are absorbed by her unborn child Prahlada.

Five years later, Prahlada, who does not see his father as God, is secretly a devotee of Vishnu. When his father finds out about Prahlada's devotion, he orders Prahlada's teachers and Shukra's sons to teach the boy better, but they fail to do so, and Prahlada even preaches his faith to Shukra's sons. Infuriated, the demon king sentences his son to death, but attempts to execute him are unsuccessful, as Prahlada emerges unharmed each time, protected by the very force his father seeks to destroy.

Hiranyakashipu then turns to his sister Holika, who has been granted a boon of invincibility against fire. He then has Holika take Prahlada with her to the pyre for Prahlada to burn. Ironically, however, Holika gets burned to death, as her boon was conditional on being used only for righteous reasons, while Prahlada emerges unharmed. Frustrated, Hiranyakashipu has him thrown into the ocean, only for Garuda and Varuna to save the child. When Varuna tells the boy that, like him, Vishnu longs to meet him too, Prahlada calls out to him tearfully in a moment of desperation. Surprising him, Vishnu appears and tells him that he has won him over with his selfless love. Prahlada requests to perceive him in every animate and inanimate object, which Vishnu grants.

Upon returning home, Prahlada is mocked by his father, who sarcastically asks if Vishnu is present within a nearby pillar. Prahlada affirms that he is present. Enraged, Hiranyakashipu strikes the pillar, from which Vishnu emerges in the form of Narasimha, a terrifying avatar with the body of a man and the head and claws of a lion. A massive battle ensues, during which Narasimha slaughters many demons. The avatar ultimately defeats Hiranyakashipu and kills him through evisceration in a manner that circumvents Brahma's boon: at twilight (neither day nor night), at the entrance (neither indoors nor outdoors), on his lap (neither on land nor in the sky), using his claws (neither by hand nor weapon), and as an avatar (neither a man nor an animal). Shukra fails to save Hiranyakashipu as his soul is granted moksha.

However, even after killing Hiranyakashipu, Narasimha remains terrifyingly and extremely furious and goes on a destructive rampage, with his rage shaking the cosmos. Brahma sends Prahlada to pacify Narasimha's rage, which he does. A calmed-down Narasimha then embraces Prahlada, assuring him that his father has been purified of his sins by divine touch. He declares that from now on the boy shall be revered as one of his greatest devotees, and that whoever worships him will undoubtedly be worthy of his grace.

Surrounding devotees, along with the gods and demigods, including Shiva and Parvati, gather to perform the "Narasimha Aarti", a devotional hymn. Afterwards, Narada reminds Indra that Hiranyakashipu and Hiranyaksha were only the first of three births of Jaya-Vijaya in Satya Yuga.

== Voice cast ==
=== Hindi version ===
- Aditya Raj Sharma as Hiranyakashipu
- Haripriya Matta as Prahlad
- Sanket Jaiswal as Narrator
- Priyanka Bhandari as Kayadhu
- Vasundhra Bose as:
  - Diti
  - Lakshmi Ji
- Harjeet Walia as Lord Narsimha
- Sanchit Wartak as Hiranyaksha
- Saanwari Yagnik as Holika
- Dinesh Varma as:
  - Kashyap Muni
  - Shukracharya
- Uplaksh Kochhar as Lord Vishnu
- Akshay Joshi as Baksia
- Harish Moily as:
  - Narad Muni
  - Guard #2
- Ajay Singhal as Guard #1
- Nehal Pandey as Bhumi (uncredited)
- Sankalp Jaiswal as Akhanda
- Karan Trivedi as:
  - Amarka
  - Sanda
- Abhishek Sharma as Lord Brahma
- Dixoan Shah as Lord Indra
- Shahid Zafar as Varun Dev
- Rakesh Soni as Demigod
- Ayushi Anand as Dina
- Anshul Sharma as Surya Dev

== Production ==
The project emerged from Kleem Productions' desire to create a 3D animated epic rooted in Hindu history. Announced in mid‑2024, the film is described by director Ashwin Kumar as a "labor of love rooted in our collective history," drawing inspiration from the Vishnu Purana, Narasimha Purana, and Shrimad Bhagavat Purana. Hombale Films presents the film.

The production marked a strategic push to elevate Indian animation. Kumar emphasized their goal to challenge the notion that animation is only for children, asserting that the film proves "Indian VFX and animation can be of world‑class quality." The animation process spanned roughly four and a half years, with particular attention paid to photorealism.

=== Incorporation of historical sites and Hindu scriptures ===
In an interview published on the official channel of Hombale Films, director Ashwin Kumar discussed his personal visit to Raktkund at Ahobila Matha and elaborated on how the film incorporates various historical and scriptural references. Similarly to the film Ram Setu, archaeological sites shape the narrative. These include Ahobila's Nava Narasimha Swamy temples, the restored Yog-Narasimha shrine in Hampi and the ruins of the Prahladpuri Temple in Multan, Pakistan. The film is also based on sacred texts like the Vishnu Purana, Varaha Purana, Narasimha Purana, Padma Purana, and the Bhagavata Purana.

== Music ==
The film score and soundtrack album of the film are composed by Sam C. S. in his first collaboration with Ashwin Kumar. The audio rights for the Kannada, Telugu, Tamil, and Malayalam versions were acquired by Think Music, while the Hindi version was acquired by Ishtar Music.

== Release ==
=== Premiere ===
Mahavatar Narsimha had its premiere on 25 November 2024 at the 55th International Film Festival of India under the Indian Panorama section. It was premiered in Hindi.

=== Theatrical ===
The film was initially scheduled for release in theatres on 3 April 2025, but was postponed and released on 25 July 2025. It was theatrically released in Hindi, Kannada, Tamil, Telugu, and Malayalam. The theatrical version had a runtime of 131 minutes, 10 minutes less than the film festival version.

=== Marketing ===
A motion poster of the film was released on 16 November 2024. A teaser trailer of the film was released on 14 January 2025, on Makar Sankranti. The trailer of the film was released on 9 July 2025 on the official YouTube channel of Hombale Films in five languages (Hindi, Telugu, Tamil, Kannada, and Malayalam).

=== Distribution ===
The distribution rights were acquired by AA Films in North India and Nepal. The film's presenter Hombale Films handled the acquisition for the Karnataka distribution rights. The distribution rights in Andhra Pradesh and Telangana were acquired by Geetha Arts. The Kerala distribution rights were acquired by Prithviraj Productions. The distribution rights in Tamil Nadu were acquired by Think Studios and S Picture.

The overseas distribution rights in North America were acquired by Prathyangira Cinemas. The distribution rights in the Middle East were acquired by Phars Film Co. The Australia and New Zealand distribution rights were acquired by Tolly Movies International. The theatrical rights in the United Kingdom were acquired by Dreamz Entertainment. The distribution rights in Singapore and Sri Lanka were acquired by Home Screen Entertainment. The Malaysian distribution rights were acquired by DMY Creation. The distribution rights in Europe were acquired by 4 Seasons Creations.

=== Home media ===
On 13 September 2025, a deleted scene was released on YouTube. The film began streaming on Netflix from 19 September 2025. On Netflix, the film's original language is Hindi and dubbed audios are available along with the Hindi video stream.

== Reception ==
=== Box office ===
Mahavatar Narsimha earned ₹2.29 crore on its opening day. In its first week, the film grossed ₹53 crore, including ₹32.82 crore from the Hindi version. The net box office total in India in its first week ₹43.50 crore.

The film netted ₹171 crore by its third weekend after release. In its final run, the Hindi version netted ₹188 crore, the Kannada version ₹9.87 crore, the Telugu version ₹49.14 crore, and the Tamil version ₹2.91.

The film grossed over ₹300 crore in its final theatrical run.

=== Critical response ===
Mahavatar Narsimha received generally positive reviews from critics who praised the screenplay, music, animation, story and acting but criticized its graphic violence which was deemed too violent in the animation genre.

Ahana Tiwari of Zee News gave 4/5 stars and wrote, "In the end, Mahavatar Narsimha might be far from perfect, yet standing as a quietly confident and emotionally effective film that successfully delivers a deeply moving and devotional cinematic experience. While not without its flaws, it more than compensates with its heart, message, and the sheer sincerity of its storytelling". Anurag Singh Bohra of India Today rated the film 3.5/5 stars and wrote, "Overall, the film makes for a compelling watch for its emotional relatability and stunning depiction of Narsimha in the goosebump-inducing climax". Susmita Sameera of The Times of India rated it 3/5 stars and wrote, "Mahavatar Narsimha is made with sincerity and ambition. As a first attempt, it lays the groundwork for a promising future in Indian animated devotional cinema. It is certainly worth experiencing in theatres—for both its pioneering effort and its visual ambition". Bhawna Arya of Times Now gave 3/5 stars and wrote, "To sum it up, Mahavatar Narsimha by Hombale is an animated film that beautifully and eloquently celebrates the fierceness of Vishnu's incarnation with breathtaking artistry and heartfelt storytelling". Ganesh Aaglave of Firstpost gave 3/5 stars and wrote, "In the time of larger-than-life action spectacles and rom-coms, experiencing a movie like Mahavatar Narsimha definitely evokes different kinds of positive and holistic emotions". Shubhra Gupta of The Indian Express gave 2.5/5 stars and wrote, "The climax is world-class, even if ultra-violent, with body parts and blood flowing generously. Trigger warning for small kids. And yourself, if you are faint-hearted. But hey, demons being torn to pieces feels as if justice has been done: our gods really know how to do the Avengers thing".

== Future ==
In June 2025, the filmmakers announced plans to expand Mahavatar Narsimha into a larger animated franchise, the Mahavatar Cinematic Universe, based on the avatars of Vishnu. Director Ashwin Kumar and Kleem Productions, in association with Hombale Films, revealed a 12-year plan to adapt the Dashavatar in an interconnected series of 3D-animated films.

The Universe is planned to release new installments every two years, from 2025 to 2037, depicting each avatar with modern cinematic storytelling for global audiences. While Mahavatar Narsimha serves as the launch, future entries will follow the remaining avatars in chronological order.

As of July 2025, seven films have been announced in the Mahavatar Cinematic Universe. The franchise begins with Narasimha and ends with a two-part finale on Kalki. Each film is based on a different avatar of Vishnu, either individually or thematically. First look of next instalment, Mahavatar Parshuram was revealed on 19 April 2026, is scheduled to be released in December 2027.

Title	Avatar Focus	Other Avatar(s) covered	Director	Release year	Notes
Mahavatar Narsimha	Narasimha (4th avatar)	Varaha (3rd avatar)	Ashwin Kumar	2025	First installment
Mahavatar Parshuram	Parashurama (6th avatar)		Ashwin Kumar	2027	
Mahavatar Raghunandan	Rama (7th avatar)			2029	"Raghunandan" is another name of Rama
Mahavatar Dwarkadhish	Krishna (8th avatar)			2031	Focuses on Krishna's later years in Dwarka; "Dwarkadhish" means "ruler of Dwarka"
Mahavatar Gokulananda	Krishna (8th avatar)			2033	Childhood of Krishna in Gokul; "Gokulananda" means "joy of Gokul"
Mahavatar Kalki Part I	Kalki (10th avatar)			2035	
Mahavatar Kalki Part II	Kalki (10th avatar)			2037	
