= Mohan Kumar (serial killer) =

Indian serial killer

- Born: 1963 (age 62–63); Karnataka, India
- Other names: Cyanide Mohan; Ananda; Bhaskara; Bhaskar
- Penalty: Death penalty (commuted to life imprisonment)

Details
- Victims: 20
- Span of crimes: 2003–2009
- Country: India
- Date apprehended: 21 October 2009

Mohan Kumar Vivekanand (born 1963), also known as Cyanide Mohan, is a serial killer who preyed on women looking for marriage. A Mangalore fast-track court tried and convicted him for the murder of 20 women in Karnataka from 2003 to 2009.

He was accused of luring women around the age of 22-35 who were unable to pay dowry or were unable to find suitable husbands. Kumar would offer these women that he would marry them without asking for a dowry. He would kill them by giving them cyanide pills and robbing them of their jewellery.

Apart from murder, he was also alleged to have been involved in bank loan frauds and forgeries.

== Early career ==
He was a primary school physical education teacher from Dakshina Kannada (1980 to 2003).

== Capture ==
In 2009, the police were looking into the disappearance of Anitha (22 years old), and her phone calls revealed more than what they were looking for. Her phone records showed that Anitha was in contact with another missing girl. Consequently, the authorities were able to track down a person who was using the girl's cellphone.

The police discovered eight cyanide tablets, four mobile phones, and jewellery belonging to Anitha with Mohan. On 21 October, Mohan Kumar was apprehended. Following his arrest, the police not only charged him with Anitha's rape and murder but also chose to reopen the cases of 17 missing girls.

== Trial ==
Upon his arrest in 2009, he was put on trial for two years before being convicted and sentenced to death for the murder of Anitha in 2013. However, in 2017, the Karnataka High Court commuted his execution sentence to life imprisonment.

In 2020, he was found guilty of raping and murdering a 25-year-old woman from Kasaragod, his 20th murder conviction.

== In popular culture ==
In 2023, Dahaad, an Indian police procedural crime thriller television series, Vijay Varma’s character is based on Mohan Kumar.

In 2025, Indian crime thriller film Bhagwat Chapter One: Raakshas was released. It is inspired by the life of Mohan Kumar. Jitendra Kumar played as the antagonist.

In 2025, in the Malayalam film Kalamkaaval, the character of the main antagonist is loosely based on the life of Mohan, which is portrayed by Mammootty.

== See also ==
- List of serial killers by country
- List of serial killers by number of victims
- The Deadly Dozen: India's Most Notorious Serial Killers by Anirban Bhattacharyya
