= Harry Baweja =

Indian film director

- Born: Harjaspal Baweja; 1956 (age 69–70)
- Occupations: film director, producer
- Spouse: Pammi Baweja
- Children: 2, including Harman Baweja

Harjaspal Baweja (born 1956) is an Indian film director and producer. He made his debut with Trinetra (1991), and is known for directing films like Dilwale (1994) and Diljale (1996). He is the founder of production company Baweja Studios.

== Early life ==
Baweja is based in Mumbai and hails from Ludhiana, Punjab, India. He is married to film producer, Pammi Baweja. Actor Harman Baweja is their son.

== Filmography ==
=== As Assistant Director ===
| Film | Year | Director | Notes |
|---|---|---|---|
| Kasam Paida Karne Wale Ki | 1984 | Babbar Subhash | Assistant director |
| Adventures of Tarzan | 1985 | Babbar Subhash | Third assistant director |
| Dance Dance | 1987 | Babbar Subhash | Chief assistant director |
| Commando | 1988 | Babbar Subhash | Chief assistant director |

=== As director ===
| Year | Film | Notes |
|---|---|---|
| 1991 | Trinetra | |
| 1994 | Dilwale | |
| 1994 | Imtihaan | |
| 1996 | Diljale | |
| 2000 | Deewane | |
| 2001 | Mujhe Meri Biwi Se Bachaao | |
| 2002 | Karz: The Burden of Truth | |
| 2003 | Qayamat: City Under Threat | |
| 2005 | Main Aisa Hi Hoon | |
| 2006 | Teesri Aankh | |
| 2008 | Love Story 2050 | |
| 2014 | Chaar Sahibzaade | animated film |
| 2016 | Chaar Sahibzaade: Rise of Banda Singh Bahadur | animated film |

=== As producer ===
| Year | Film/Show | Director | Notes |
|---|---|---|---|
| 2005 | Karam | Sanjay F. Gupta | |
| 2007 | Speed | Vikram Bhatt | |
| 2010–2011 | Ganga Kii Dheej | Anil V. Kumar | TV series aired on Sahara One |

=== As writer ===
| Film | Notes |
|---|---|
| Trinetra | Story |
| Mujhe Meri Biwi Se Bachaao | Story |
| Main Aisa Hi Hoon | Story |
| Teesri Aankh: The Hidden Camera | Story and Screenplay |
| Love Story 2050 | Story and Screenplay |
| Chaar Sahibzaade | Story and Screenplay |
| Chaar Sahibzaade: Rise of Banda Singh Bahadur | Story and Screenplay |

=== As music director ===
| Film | Notes |
|---|---|
| Chaar Sahibzaade: Rise of Banda Singh Bahadur | Songs "Bande Da", "Jioundi Hi", "Bol Maaye", "Deh Shiva", "Ik Shahar Hai" and "Waheguru Waheguru" |
