= Harman Baweja =

Indian actor and producer (born 1980)

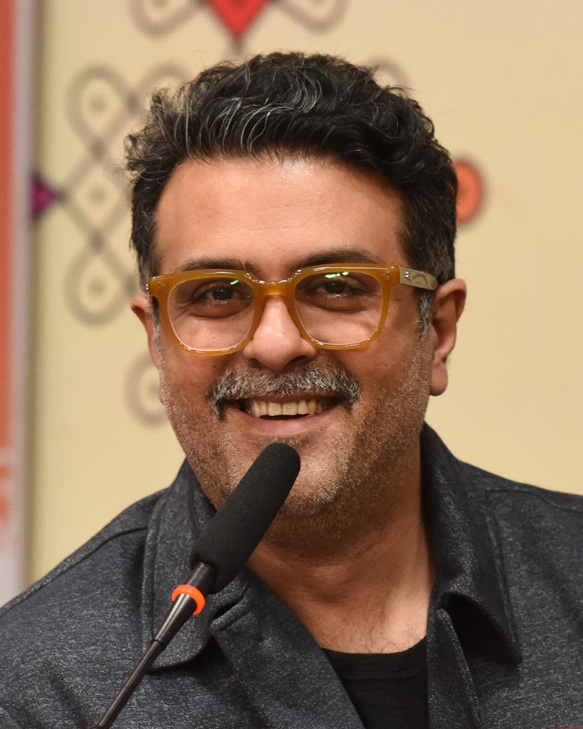
- Baweja in 2024
- Born: 13 November 1980 (age 45); Chandigarh, India
- Occupations: Actor; producer; screenwriter
- Years active: 2002–present
- Spouse: Sasha Ramchandani (m. 2021)
- Children: 2
- Parents: Harry Baweja (father); Pammi Baweja (mother)

Harman Baweja (born 13 November 1980) is an Indian actor, producer and screenwriter. The son of film director Harry Baweja and producer Pammi Baweja, he has starred in the Hindi films Love Story 2050 (2008), What's Your Raashee? (2009), Victory (2009), and Dishkiyaoon (2014). After a hiatus, he featured in the Netflix drama series Scoop (2023). He has also worked in Punjabi cinema.

== Early life and education ==
Baweja was born to a film director Harry Baweja and producer Pammi Baweja. Born on 13 November 1980 in Chandigarh, in 1984 his family had to shift to Mumbai following the anti-Sikh riots.

He attended the Kishore Namit Kapoor Acting Institute in Bombay and then the University of California, Los Angeles.

Before becoming an actor, he worked in hotel management for around a year and was an assistant director to his father for some seven years.

== Career ==
Baweja was credited as a producer for Hansal Mehta's Yeh Kya Ho Raha Hai? (2002).

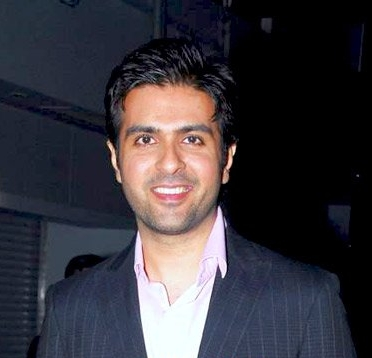
Baweja in 2011

Baweja's made his acting debut in the sci-fi romance Love Story 2050 produced by his mother Pammi Baweja and directed by his father Harry Baweja. The film was a box office failure. In 2009, he appeared in the sports film Victory. The film had notable appearances by both Indian and International cricketers. The film could only rake up ₹1.9 crore after its release and was a failure at the box office. Baweja next appeared in the romantic comedy What's Your Raashee? which starred him and Priyanka Chopra, who performed 12 different roles in the film. The film received mixed responses both from critics and audience. The film performed poor at the box office. After a 5 year long absence, he appeared in Dishkiyaoon (2014).

His delayed release, It's My Life, released directly on television in 2020, 10 years after production, with a premiere on Zee Cinema. After almost a decade, Baweja made his screen comeback with the role of JCP Harshavardhan Shroff in the Netflix original series Scoop, created and directed by Mehta.

== Filmography ==
=== As an actor ===
Year	Title	Role	Notes
2008	Love Story 2050	Karan Malhotra	Debut
2009	Victory	Vijay Shekhawat	
2009	What's Your Raashee?	Yogesh Patel	
2009	Echo of Eco	Indian industrialist	Short film
2014	Dishkiyaoon	Viki Kartoos	
2020	It's My Life	Abhishek "Abhi" Sharma	Delayed release, Filmed in 2007
2023	Scoop	JCP Harshvardhan Shroff	Netflix series

=== As a producer and screenwriter ===
Year	Title	Producer	Screenwriter	Notes
2002	Yeh Kya Ho Raha Hai?	Yes		
2016	Chaar Sahibzaade: Rise of Banda Singh Bahadur	Yes	Yes	Punjabi film
2019–2020	Super V	Yes	Yes	Creator; TV series
2020–2022	Bhaukaal	Yes		TV series
2021	Jinne Jamme Saare Nikamme	Yes		Punjabi film
2022	Honeymoon	Yes		Punjabi film
2024	Khwaabon Ka Jhamela	Yes	Yes	
2025	Chidiya Udd	Yes		TV series
2025	Mrs.	Yes	Yes	
2025	Perusu	Yes		Tamil film
2025	Bhagwat Chapter One: Raakshas	Yes		Released on ZEE5
2025	Haq	Yes		
2026	System	Yes		Prime Video film
2026	Dil Ka Darwaaza Khol Na Darling	Yes		Post-production
TBA	Maharagni- Queen of Queens	Yes		Post-production
