= List of animated feature films of 2013 =

This is a list of animated feature films that were released in 2013.

== List ==
Animated feature films of 2013
Title	Country	Director	Production company	Animation technique	Notes	Type	Release date	Duration
The Adventures of Sinbad	India	Shinjan Neogi; Abhishek Panchal	Lodi Films Pvt. Ltd	Flash			March 22, 2013	110 minutes
Alpha and Omega 2: A Howl-iday Adventure	United States; Canada	Richard Rich	Lionsgate; Crest Animation Productions	Computer		Direct-to-video	October 8, 2013	45 minutes
Anina	Uruguay	Alfredo Soderguit	Palermo Estudio	Flash			February 12, 2013 (Berlin IFF); April 19, 2013 (Uruguay)	80 minutes
Go! Anpanman: Fly! The Handkerchief of Hope	Japan	Hiroyuki Yano	Anpanman Production Committee; TMS Entertainment	Traditional			July 6, 2013	47 minutes
Anohana: The Flower We Saw That Day あの日見た花の名前を僕達はまだ知らない. (Ano Hi Mita Hana no Namae o Bokutachi wa Mada Shiranai)	Japan	Tatsuyuki Nagai	A-1 Pictures	Traditional			August 31, 2013	99 minutes
The Art of Happiness	Italy	Alessandro Rak	Big Sur; Mad Entertainment; Mai Cinema	Traditional			August 28, 2013 (Venice); November 21, 2013 (Italy)	82 minutes
Asphalt Watches	Canada	Shane Ehman; Seth Scriver	Delusional Brothers	Flash			September 10, 2013 (TIFF)	94 minutes
Aura: Maryūinkōga Saigo no Tatakai	Japan	Seiji Kishi	AIC	Traditional			April 13, 2013	83 minutes
Axel: The Biggest Little Hero; Bonta	China	Leo Lee	Zhejiang Versatile	Computer			August 2, 2013	80 minutes
Aya of Yop City; Aya de Yopougon	France	Marguerite Abouet, Clement Oubrerie	Autochenille Production	Traditional / Flash			July 17, 2013	84 minutes
Ayas	Turkey	Hüseyin Emre Konyalı, Mustafa Tuğrul Tiryaki	Düşyeri Animation Studios	Computer			November 22, 2013	82 minutes
Barbie & Her Sisters in A Pony Tale	United States	Kyran Kelly	Universal Studios; Arc Productions; Rainmaker Studios	Computer			October 22, 2013	72 minutes
Barbie: Mariposa & the Fairy Princess	United States	William Lau	Universal Studios; Arc Productions; Rainmaker Studios	Computer			August 27, 2013	75 minutes
Barbie in the Pink Shoes	United States	Owen Hurley	Universal Studios; Arc Productions; Rainmaker Studios	Computer			February 26, 2013	72 minutes
Batman: The Dark Knight Returns – Part 2	United States	Jay Oliva	Warner Bros. Animation	Traditional		Direct-to-video	January 29, 2013 (Part 2)	76 minutes (Part 2)
Bayonetta: Bloody Fate	Japan	Fuminori Kizaki	Gonzo	Traditional			November 23, 2013	91 minutes
Berserk Golden Age Arc III: The Advent	Japan	Toshiyuki Kubooka	Studio 4 °C	Traditional			February 1, 2013	113 minutes
Bold Eagles; Pelle Politibil på sporet	Norway	Rasmus A. Sivertsen	Neofilm AS	Computer			March 3, 2013	82 minutes
Bratz: Go to Paris the Movie	United States	Mucci Fassett	MGA Entertainment	Computer		Direct-to-DVD	October 8, 2013	61 minutes
A Certain Magical Index: The Movie – The Miracle of Endymion	Japan	Hiroshi Nishikori	J.C. Staff	Traditional			February 23, 2013	90 minutes
Cheatin'	United States	Bill Plympton	Plymptoons	Traditional			October 11, 2013 (Sitges); August 15, 2014	76 minutes
Cheech & Chong's Animated Movie	United States	Branden Chambers, Eric D. Chambers	Houston Curtis Productions; Chamber Bros. Entertainment	Flash			March 18, 2013	83 minutes
Chhatrapati Shivaji - The Emperor of People's Pride	India	Azhar Khan	Aman Anam Productions	Computer	First indian multilingual animated film based on Chatrpati Shivaji, the founder of Maratha Empire	Theatrical	August 2, 2013	95 minutes
Chhota Bheem and the Throne of Bali	India	Rajiv Chilaka	Green Gold Animation	Traditional			May 3, 2013	107 minutes
Cloudy with a Chance of Meatballs 2	United States	Cody Cameron; Kris Pearn	Sony Pictures Animation	Computer	Sequel to Cloudy with a Chance of Meatballs (2009).	Theatrical	September 27, 2013	95 minutes
The Congress	France; Israel; Belgium; Poland; Luxembourg; Germany	Ari Folman	Pandora Filmproduktion; ARP Sélection (France); Cinéart (Belgium/Luxembourg); Pandora Film Verleih (Germany); Gutek Film (Poland)	Traditional / Live action			May 15, 2013 (Cannes); July 3, 2013 (France)	123 minutes
Crayon Shin-chan: Stupid Horse!: B-class Gourmet Survival	Japan	Masakazu Hashimoto	Shin-Ei Animation	Traditional			April 20, 2013	96 minutes
The Croods	United States	Chris Sanders; Kirk DeMicco	DreamWorks Animation	Computer		Theatrical	February 15, 2013 (Berlin); March 22, 2013	98 minutes
Death & the Robot	United States	Austin Taylor	University of North Carolina School of the Arts	Stop Motion			May 9, 2013	11 minutes
Despicable Me 2	United States	Pierre Coffin; Chris Renaud	Illumination Entertainment	Computer		Theatrical	June 5, 2013 (Australia); July 3, 2013	98 minutes
Detective Conan: Private Eye in the Distant Sea	Japan	Kobun Shizuno	TMS Entertainment	Traditional			April 20, 2013	101 minutes
Dick Figures: The Movie	United States	Ed Skudder, Zack Keller	Six Point Harness; Remochoso	Flash	This was the first animated feature film to be released on the Internet.		September 17, 2013 (United States); November 9, 2013 (Buffer Festival)	73 minutes
Doraemon: Nobita no Himitsu Dōgu Museum	Japan	Yukiyo Teramoto	Shin-Ei Animation	Traditional			March 9, 2013	104 minutes
Dragon Ball Z: Battle of Gods	Japan	Masahiro Hosoda	Toei Animation	Traditional			March 30, 2013	85 minutes (theatrical); 105 minutes (Special Edition)
Dragon Guardians; El corazón del roble	Spain	Ángel Izquierdo, Ricardo Ramón	Barton Films / Canal Sur Televisión / Dibulitoon Studio / Euskal Irrati Telebista (EiTB) / Milimetros Dibujos Animados	Computer			January 18, 2013 (Spain); September 20, 2013 (Donostia-San Sebastián International Film Festival)	73 minutes
Epic	United States	Chris Wedge	Blue Sky Studios	Computer		Theatrical	May 16, 2013 (International); May 18, 2013 (Ziegfeld Theatre); May 24, 2013	102 minutes
Escape from Planet Earth	Canada; United States	Cal Brunker	Rainmaker Entertainment; The Weinstein Company	Computer			February 15, 2013	89 minutes
Extraordinary Tales	Belgium; France; Luxembourg	Raúl García	The Big Farm; Melusine Prods	Computer			February 28, 2013 (Luxembourg City Film Festival); February 2015 (Anima Brussels Animation Film Festival); June 27, 2015 (Munich International Film Festival)	73 minutes
The Fake	South Korea	Yeon Sang-ho	Studio Dada Show	Traditional			September 7, 2013 (Toronto); November 21, 2013 (South Korea)	101 minutes
Fernanda and the Strange Case of Dr. X and Mr. Jai; Fernanda y el extraño caso del Dr. X y Mr. Jai	Cuba	Mario Rivas	Instituto Cubano del Arte e Industria Cinematográficos	Flash			October 20, 2013	91 minutes
Free Birds	United States	Jimmy Hayward	Reel FX Animation Studios; Relativity Media	Computer			November 1, 2013	91 minutes
The Frog Kingdom	China	Nelson Shin	Vixo	Computer			December 28, 2013 (China); June 30, 2015 (United States)	90 minutes
Frozen	United States	Chris Buck; Jennifer Lee	Walt Disney Animation Studios	Computer		Theatrical	November 19, 2013 (El Capitan Theatre); November 22, 2013 (United States)	102 minutes
The Garden of Words	Japan	Makoto Shinkai	CoMix Wave Films	Traditional			April 28, 2013 (Gold Coast); May 31, 2013 (Japan)	46 minutes
Gekijō-ban Mahō Shōjo Madoka Magica Shinpen: Hangyaku no Monogatari	Japan	Akiyuki Shinbo	Shaft	Traditional			October 26, 2013	116 minutes
Gekijō-ban Tiger & Bunny -The Beginning-	Japan	Yoshitomo Yonetani	Sunrise	Traditional			September 22, 2012 (Japan); November 20, 2013 (DVD premiere)	88 minutes
Gintama: The Movie: The Final Chapter: Be Forever Yorozuya	Japan	Yoichi Fujita	Sunrise	Traditional			July 6, 2013	110 minutes
Hakuoki: Wild Dance of Kyoto	Japan	Osamu Yamasaki	Studio Deen	Traditional			August 24, 2013	96 minutes
Hal	Japan	Ryōtarō Makihara	Pony Canyon; Production I.G. Wit Studio; Shochiku	Traditional			June 8, 2013	60 minutes
Hanasaku Iroha: The Movie – Home Sweet Home	Japan	Masahiro Andō	P.A. Works	Traditional			March 30, 2013	66 minutes
Hocus Pocus Alfie Atkins; Hokus pokus Alfons Åberg	Sweden; Denmark; Norway	Torill Kove	Maipo Film; A. Film Production; Eyeworks; SVT; Norsk Filminstitutt; Svenska Filminstitutet; Det Danske Filminstitut; Nordisk Film; TV Fond Media	Traditional			August 23, 2013 (Sweden); September 13, 2013 (Norway); December 25, 2013 (Denmark)	76 minutes
The House of Magic	Belgium; France	Ben Stassen, Jérémie Degruson	nWave Pictures; Anton Capital Entertainment uMedia	Computer		Theatrical	December 25, 2013	85 minutes
How to Catch a Feather from the Firebird; Как поймать перо Жар-Птицы	Russia	Vyacheslav Plotnikov	Inlay Film	Traditional			November 10, 2013	
Hunter × Hunter: Phantom Rouge	Japan	Yūzō Satō	Madhouse	Traditional			January 12, 2013	97 minutes
Hunter × Hunter: The Last Mission	Japan	Keiichiro Kawaguchi	Madhouse	Traditional			December 27, 2013	98 minutes
I Love Wolffy 2	China	Kai Ye	Mr. Cartoon Pictures; Creative Power Entertaining; Beijing Kaku Media; BestTV Media; Nanjing Radio and TV Station; Pearl River Pictures; Beijing Hangmei Entertainment	Traditional			August 1, 2013	88 minutes
Iron Man & Hulk: Heroes United	United States	Eric Radomski, Leo Riley	Marvel Animation, Brain Zoo Studios	Computer		Direct-to-video	December 3, 2013	71 minutes
Iron Man: Rise of Technovore	Japan	Hiroshi Hamasaki	Madhouse	Traditional		Direct-to-video	April 24, 2013	88 minutes
Ivan Tsarevich and the Gray Wolf 2 Иван Царевич и Серый волк 2	Russia	Vladimir Toropchin	Melnitsa Animation Studio	Traditional			December 26, 2013	73 minutes
Jack and the Cuckoo-Clock Heart; Jack et la mécanique du cœur	France	Stéphane Berla; Mathias Malzieu	Duran; EuropaCorp; France 3 Cinéma uFilm; Walking the Dog	Computer			November 17, 2013 (Arras Film Festival); December 20, 2013 (United States); January 15, 2014 (Mexico); February 5, 2014 (France)	93 minutes
Jay & Silent Bob's Super Groovy Cartoon Movie	United States	Steve Stark	SModcast Pictures; View Askew Productions	Flash			April 20, 2013	64 minutes
Jungle Master	China	Kerr Xu	Hippo Animation	Computer			January 19, 2013	90 minutes
Justin and the Knights of Valour; Justin y la espada del valor	Spain	Manuel Sicilia	Kandor Graphics	Computer		Theatrical	September 13, 2013 (United Kingdom); September 20, 2013 (Spain)	96 minutes
The Tale of the Princess Kaguya; Kaguya-Hime no Monogatari	Japan	Isao Takahata	Studio Ghibli	Traditional			November 23, 2013	137 minutes
Kara no Kyōkai: Mirai Fukuin	Japan	Tomonori Sudou	Ufotable	Traditional			September 28, 2013	32 minutes
No-Eared Bunny and Two-Eared Chick de:Keinohrhase und Zweiohrküken	Germany	Maya Gräfin Rothkirch; Til Schweiger		Computer			September 26, 2013	75 minutes
Khumba	South Africa	Anthony Silverston	Triggerfish Animation Studios; Spier Films	Computer			September 8, 2013 (TIFF); October 25, 2013	85 minutes
Knight Rusty; Ritter Rost – Eisenhart und voll verbeult	Germany	Thomas Bodenstein		Computer			January 10, 2013	84 minutes
Kuiba 2	China	Chuan Wang		Traditional			May 31, 2013	83 minutes
Ku! Kin-dza-dza	Russia	Georgy Danelia; Tatyana Ilyina	Channel One; CTB, Ритм; Ugra Film	Traditional			April 11, 2013	97 minutes
The Legend of Sarila	Canada	Nancy Florence Savard	10th Ave. Productions; CarpeDiem Film & TV	Computer			February 22, 2013	82 minutes
Legends of Oz: Dorothy's Return	United States	Dan St. Pierre, Will Finn	Summertime Entertainment; Prana Studios	Computer		Theatrical	June 14, 2013 (AIAFF); May 9, 2014 (United States)	88 minutes
Lisa Limone and Maroc Orange: A Rapid Love Story; Lisa Limone ja Maroc Orange: Tormakas armulugu	Estonia	Mait Laas	Nukufilm	Stop motion			March 8, 2013	72 minutes
The Little Fishgirl	Czech Republic	Jan Balej		Stop motion			January 1, 2013	15 minutes
The Lost 15 Boys: The Big Adventure on Pirates' Island	China; Japan	Xiaohan; Mao Qichao; Ba Yunfeng; Zhang Bing; Ryūtarō Nakamura	China Film Group Corporation; Sichuan Institute Of Media; Zhigengniao Computer Art Co., Ltd; Shanweiduo Media Co., Ltd	Cel shaded Computer			November 16, 2013 (Japan); October 1, 2014 (China)	82 minutes
Lupin the 3rd vs. Detective Conan: The Movie	Japan	Hajime Kamegaki	TMS Entertainment	Traditional	Theatrical film sequel to the television film Lupin the 3rd vs. Detective Conan (2009); crossover of Lupin the Third and Case Closed.	Theatrical	December 7, 2013	107 minutes
The Magic Snowflake; L'apprenti Père Noël et le flocon magique	France	Luc Vinciguerra	Gaumont Alphanim; Snipple Animation; Dapaco Productions	Traditional			November 20, 2013; December 23, 2015 (United States)	73 minutes
Majocco Shimai no Yoyo to Nene	Japan	Takayuki Hirao	Ufotable	Traditional			December 28, 2013	100 minutes
Metalocalypse: The Doomstar Requiem	United States	Mark Brooks	Titmouse, Inc. Williams Street	Flash			October 27, 2013	47 minutes
Miffy the Movie; Nijntje de film	Denmark; Netherlands	Hans Perk	A. Film A/S / Telescreen Film Productions / Mercis / KRO	Stop motion			January 30, 2013 (Netherlands); June 21, 2015 (United Kingdom)	70 minutes
Minuscule: Valley of the Lost Ants; Minuscule – La Vallée des Fourmis Perdues	France	Hélène Giraud; Thomas Szabo	Entre Chien et Loup; Futurikon; Futurikon Production II; Nozon; Vivi Film; Warner Chappel France	Computer			November 17, 2013 (Tallinn); January 29, 2014; February 26, 2014 (Belgium)	89 minutes
Missing U	United States	Brooke Wagstaff	Ringling College of Art and Design	Computer		Direct to video	13 July 2013	2 minutes 29 seconds
Monsters University	United States	Dan Scanlon	Pixar Animation Studios	Computer	Prequel to Monsters, Inc. (2001).	Theatrical	June 5, 2013 (BFI Southbank); June 21, 2013	104 minutes
Moshi Monsters: The Movie	United Kingdom	Wip Vernooij; Morgan Francis	Mind Candy	Flash		Theatrical	December 20, 2013	81 minutes
Motu Patlu in Wonderland!	India	Suhas Kadav	Maya Digital Studios; Cosmos Entertainment; Viacom 18; Nickelodeon India	Computer			July 10, 2013	76 minutes
My Little Pony: Equestria Girls	United States; Canada	Jayson Thiessen	Hasbro Studios, DHX Media/Vancouver	Flash			June 15, 2013 (Los Angeles Film Festival); June 16, 2013 (United States and Canada)	73 minutes
My Little World	United States	Mike Nguyen	July Films	Traditional				80 minutes
The Mythical Ark: Adventures in Love & Happiness	China	William Kan; Huang Xiaoxue; Yu Tak Wai	Toonmax Media; Creative Power Entertaining; UYoung Culture & Media	Traditional			January 24, 2013 (Mainland China)	86 minutes
Odyssey 2050 The Movie	Costa Rica	Daniel Bermejo / Bruce Callow	Synchro Films	Computer			2012	Short Film in Spanish and English: 12 minutes Longer Spanish version: 47 minutes Feature Film: tbc
Oggy and the Cockroaches: The Movie; Oggy et les Cafards	France	Olivier Jean-Marie	Xilam; France 3 Cinéma; Canal+ France Télévisions; CNC; B Media Kids; Backup Films, A Plus Image 4 Cofinova 9 Cofimage 24; Cube Créative; Mikros Image	Traditional; Computer ("Oggy-Wan Kenoggy")			August 7, 2013	82 minutes
The Olsen Gang in Deep Trouble; Olsen Banden på dybt vand	Denmark	Jørgen Lerdam	A. Film Production, Nordisk Film	Computer			October 10, 2013	100 minutes
Once Upon a Time; Malayalam	India	Binu Sasidharan	Wireframe Animation	Computer			May 24, 2013	100 minutes
Otto the Rhino; Otto er et næsehorn	Denmark	Kenneth Kainz	Crone Film	Computer			February 7, 2013	76 minutes
Oz the Great and Powerful	United States	Sam Raimi	Roth Films	Computer / Live action		Theatrical	March 8, 2013	130 minutes
Patema Inverted; Sakasama no Patema	Japan	Yasuhiro Yoshiura	Purple Cow Studio Japan	Traditional			November 9, 2013	99 minutes
Persona 3 The Movie: Chapter 1, Spring of Birth	Japan	Noriaki Akitaya; Tomohisa Taguchi (Note: Series Unit Director (シリーズ演出))	AIC ASTA	Traditional			November 23, 2013	91 minutes
Pinocchio	Italy; France; Belgium; Luxembourg	Enzo D'Alò	2d3D Animations, Cometa Film, Iris Productions, Walking the dog	Traditional			August 20, 2012 (Venice); March 21, 2013 (Italy)	84 minutes
Planes	United States	Klay Hall	Disneytoon Studios	Computer		Theatrical	August 2, 2013 (EAA AirVenture Oshkosh); August 9, 2013 (United States)	92 minutes
Poe	United States	Michael Sporn	Michael Sporn Animation, Inc.	Traditional			June 6, 2013	90 minutes
Pokémon the Movie: Genesect and the Legend Awakened	Japan	Kunihiko Yuyama	OLM, Inc.	Traditional			July 13, 2013	72 minutes
Pororo, The Racing Adventure 뽀로로 극장판 슈퍼썰매 대모험	China; South Korea	Young Kyun Park	CJ Entertainment; Leading Investment Co., Ltd. China ACG Group Co., Ltd. China Entertainment Corporation Co., Ltd. Ocon Studios	Computer			January 23, 2013 (South Korea); January 25, 2013 (China); October 6, 2014 (United States)	79 minutes
Pretty Cure All-Stars New Stage 2: Kokoro no Tomodachi	Japan	Koji Ogawa	Toei Animation	Traditional			March 16, 2013	71 minutes
Prince Ivan and the Firebird; Как поймать перо Жар-Птицы	Russia	Vyacheslav Plotnikov		Traditional			October 24, 2013	80 minutes
Princess Twins of Legendale	United States	Doug Krohn	MGA Entertainment	Computer			August 2013	74 minutes
The Return of Buratino; Возвращение Буратино	Russia	Ekaterina Mikhaylova	Animose Studio; UMP Studio	Traditional			April 25, 2013	76 minutes
Rio 2096: A Story of Love and Fury; Uma História de Amor e Fúria	Brazil	Luiz Bolognesi	Buriti Filmes, Gullane	Traditional			March 7, 2013 (MIFF); April 5, 2013 (Brazil)	75 minutes
Robotech: Love Live Alive	United States; Japan	Gregory Snegoff; Katsuhisa Yamada	Harmony Gold USA	Traditional		Direct-to-video	July 23, 2013	90 minutes
Roco Kingdom: The Desire of Dragon	China	Sheng-jun Yu	Shenzhen Tencent Computer Systems; Jiangsu Youman Cartoon TV	Traditional			January 31, 2013	89 minutes
Saint Young Men	Japan	Noriko Takao	A-1 Pictures	Traditional			May 10, 2013	90 minutes
Saving Mr. Banks	Australia; United Kingdom; United States	John Lee Hancock	Walt Disney Pictures; Ruby Films; Essential Media and Entertainment; BBC Films; Hopscotch Features	Traditional / Live action		Theatrical	October 20, 2013 (BFI London Film Festival); November 29, 2013 (United Kingdom); December 13, 2013 (United States); January 9, 2014 (Australia)	125 minutes
Saving Santa	United Kingdom; United States	Leon Joosen, Aaron Seelman	Gateway Films; Prana Studios	Computer		Direct-to-video	November 1, 2013	83 minutes
The Smurfs 2	United States	Raja Gosnell	Sony Pictures Animation	Computer / Live Action		Theatrical	July 31, 2013	105 minutes
Scooby-Doo! Adventures: The Mystery Map	United States	Jomac Noph	Warner Bros. Animation; Spiffy Productions; Hanna-Barbera Productions	Puppetry		Direct-to-video	July 21, 2013 (San Diego Comic-Con); July 23, 2013	45 minutes
Scooby-Doo! Mask of the Blue Falcon	United States	Michael Goguen	Warner Bros. Animation; Hanna-Barbera Productions	Traditional		Direct-to-video	February 26, 2013	78 minutes
Scooby-Doo! Stage Fright	United States	Victor Cook	Warner Bros. Animation; Hanna-Barbera Productions	Traditional		Direct-to-video	August 20, 2013	78 minutes
Seer 3	China	Wang Zhangjun; Yin Yuqi	Shanghai Taomee Animation Limited; Enlight Pictures	Computer			July 12, 2013	103 minutes
Short Peace	Japan	Shuhei Morita, Katsuhiro Otomo, Hiroaki Ando, Hajime Katoki	Sunrise	Traditional			July 20, 2013	14 minutes 13 minutes 13 minutes 26 minutes
Sid The Science Kid: The Movie	United States	Drew Massey	The Jim Henson Company	Computer			March 25, 2013	75 minutes
Silver Circle	United States	Pasha Roberts	Lineplot Productions	Computer			March 22, 2013	90 minutes
Space Pirate Captain Harlock 宇宙海賊キャプテンハーロック (Uchū Kaizoku Kyaputen Hārokku)	Japan	Shinji Aramaki	Toei Animation	Computer			September 3, 2013 (Venice); September 7, 2013 (Japan)	111 minutes
Star Driver: The Movie	Japan	Takuya Igarashi	Bones	Traditional			February 9, 2013	150 minutes
Steins;Gate: Fuka Ryōiki no Déjà vu	Japan	Kanji Wakabayashi	White Fox	Traditional			April 20, 2013	90 minutes
Tarzan	United States; Germany	Reinhard Klooss	Constantin Film	Computer		Theatrical	October 17, 2013 (Russia); February 20, 2014 (Germany)	94 minutes
That Boy Emil; Emil & Ida i Lönneberga	Sweden	Per Åhlin; Alicja Björk; Lasse Persson	Filmlance International	Traditional			December 25, 2013	59 minutes
Thomas & Friends: King of the Railway	United Kingdom	Rob Silvestri	HIT Entertainment	Computer			September 2, 2013 (United States); September 17, 2013 (United Kingdom)	62 minutes
Til Sbornia Do Us Part; Até que a Sbórnia nos Separe	Brazil	Otto Guerra, Ennio Torresan Jr.	Otto Desenhos Animados	Traditional			August 14, 2013 (Gramado Film Festival); October 30, 2014 (Brazil)	83 minutes
Tom and Jerry's Giant Adventure	United States	Spike Brandt; Tony Cervone	Turner Entertainment Co. Warner Bros. Animation	Traditional		Direct-to-video	August 6, 2013	57 minutes
Turbo	United States	David Soren	DreamWorks Animation	Computer		Theatrical	July 17, 2013	96 minutes
The Ultimate Task	China	Sun Lijun	Beijing Film Academy; Hunan Aniworld Cartoon Co., Ltd; Beijing Aiyi Meixun Animation Production Co., Ltd; Huaxia Film Distribution Co., Ltd; Beijing Iqiyi Co., Ltd; Beijing Bihe Shijia Media Co., Ltd	Traditional			July 20, 2013	85 minutes
Underdogs; Metegol; Futbolín; Foosball; The Unbeatables	Argentina; Spain	Juan José Campanella	100 Bares Producciones, Antena 3 Films, Catmandu Branded Entertainment, JEMPSA, Telefe, Canal Plus	Computer		Theatrical	July 18, 2013	85 minutes (United States) 106 minutes (Argentina/Spain); 97 minutes (United Kingdom)
VeggieTales: MacLarry and the Stinky Cheese Battle	United States	Mike Nawrocki	Big Idea Productions	Computer		Direct-to-video	July 30, 2013	46 minutes
VeggieTales: Merry Larry and the True Light of Christmas	United States	Brian Roberts	Big Idea Productions	Computer		Direct-to-video	October 22, 2013	46 minutes
VeggieTales: The Little House That Stood	United States	Brian Roberts	Big Idea Productions	Computer		Direct-to-video	March 5, 2013	48 minutes
The Wind Rises (Kaze Tachinu)	Japan	Hayao Miyazaki	Studio Ghibli	Traditional		Theatrical	July 20, 2013	126 minutes
Walking with Dinosaurs	United Kingdom; United States; Australia; India	Neil Nightingale, Barry Cook	Reliance Entertainment, IM Global, BBC Earth Films, Evergreen Studios, Animal Logic	Computer		Theatrical	December 14, 2013 (Dubai Int'l Film Festival); December 20, 2013 (United States)	87 minutes
Wolfy, the Incredible Secret; Loulou, l'Incroyable Secret	France; Belgium	Eric Omond	Prima Linea Productions; Belvision Studios; France 3 RTBF	Traditional			December 18, 2013	80 minutes
The World of Goopi and Bagha	India	Shilpa Ranade	Paperboat Animation Studios; Children's Film Society; Karadi Tales	Flash			September 7, 2013 (Toronto); March 1, 2019 (India)	79 minutes
Worms; Minhocas	Brazil	Paolo Conti; Arthur Nunes	Animaking Studios; Globo Filmes; Glaz Entertainment	Stop motion			December 20, 2013 (Brazil); March 27, 2015 (United States)	80 minutes

== Highest-grossing animated films ==
The following is a list of the 11 highest-grossing animated feature films first released in 2013.

Rank	Title	Distributor/Studio	Worldwide gross	Ref.
1	Frozen	Walt Disney Pictures / Walt Disney Animation Studios	$1,290,000,000	(Note: Frozen: "Frozen (2013) – International Box Office Results". Box Office Mojo. Archived from the original on August 9, 2014. "Worldwide – $1,274,219,009 (total as of August 8, 2014; including Japanese gross up to August 3, Spain gross up to July 27 and omitting Nigerian gross)"; "Frozen (2013) – International Box Office Results: Japan". Box Office Mojo. Archived from the original on September 15, 2014.; Total as of August 3, 2014: $219,837,363 Total as of August 31, 2014: $249,036,646: "Frozen (2013) – International Box Office Results: Spain". Box Office Mojo. Archived from the original on October 19, 2014.; Total as of July 27, 2014: $231,668,597 Total as of November 2, 2014: $22,492,845: "Frozen (2013) – International Box Office Results: Nigeria". Box Office Mojo. Archived from the original on September 5, 2014.; Total as of August 17, 2014: $167,333: "Frozen (2013) – International Box Office Results: United Kingdom". Box Office Mojo. Archived from the original on October 19, 2014.; Total as of June 8, 2014: £39,090,985 Total as of November 30, 2014: £40,960,083 ($1 = £0.63866) Total as of December 7, 2014: £41,087,765 ($1 = £0.64136) Total as of December 14, 2014: £41,170,608 ($1 = £0.636) Total as of November 26, 2017: £42,840,559 ($1 = £0.7497) Total as of December 3, 2017: £42,976,318 ($1 = £0.742): "Frozen (2013) – International Box Office Results: Germany". Box Office Mojo. Archived from the original on March 22, 2016.; Total as of March 30, 2014: €35,098,170 Total as of October 18, 2015: €42,526,744 nb. the exact euro to dollar conversion rate is unknown for earnings since April 2014, but the euro never fell below parity with the dollar during 2014 and 2015 (as can be verified by comparing the exchange rate on the individual date entries at the provided reference) so an approximate conversion rate of €1:$1 is used here to give a lower-bound.)
2	Despicable Me 2	Universal Studios / Illumination Entertainment	$970,761,885	
3	Monsters University	Walt Disney Pictures / Pixar	$744,229,437	
4	The Croods	20th Century Fox / DreamWorks Animation	$587,204,668	
5	Turbo	20th Century Fox / DreamWorks Animation	$282,570,682	
6	Cloudy with a Chance of Meatballs 2	Columbia Pictures / Sony Pictures Animation	$274,325,949	
7	Epic	20th Century Fox / Blue Sky Studios	$268,426,634	
8	Planes	Walt Disney Pictures / DisneyToon Studios	$239,258,712	
9	The Wind Rises	Toho/ Studio Ghibli	$136,333,220	
10	Walking with Dinosaurs	Reliance Entertainment/IM Global/BBC Earth/Evergreen Films/Animal Logic	$126,546,518	
11	Free Birds	Relativity Media / Reel FX Animation Studios	$110,387,072	

Frozen grossed over $1.2 billion, making it the 15th highest-grossing film of all time, and the eighteenth film to surpass the billion dollar mark, respectively. It also became the second animated film after Toy Story 3 to gross $1 billion, and is the second highest-grossing animated film of all time worldwide.

== See also ==
- List of animated television series of 2013
