= Iyad =

Iyad is a masculine given name of Arabic origin. Notable people with the name include:

== Given name ==
- Iyad Jamal Al-Din (born 1961), prominent Iraqi intellectual, politician and religious cleric
- Iyad Al-Khatib (born 1992), Jordanian football player
- Abdallah Iyad Barghouti (born 1979), Palestinian leading commander in Hamas' armed wing in the West Bank
- Iyad Burnat (born 1973), leads Bil'in's non-violent struggle in the West Bank
- Iyad Ag Ghaly (born 1954), Tuareg militant from Mali's Kidal Region
- Iyad ibn Ghanm (died 641), Arab general important in the Muslim conquests of al-Jazira and northern Syria
- Iyad Abu Gharqoud (born 1988), Palestinian professional footballer
- Abu Ali Iyad (1934–1971), senior Palestinian field commander based in Syria and Jordan during the 1960s and early 1970s
- Abu Iyad (Salah Khalaf) (1933–1991), deputy chief and head of intelligence for the Palestine Liberation Organization
- Qadi Iyad (1083–1149), a Sunni polymath, theologian, historian, poet, and genealogist
- İyad el-Baghdadi (born 1977), Palestinian-Norwegian writer
- Iyad bin Amin Madani (born 1946), Saudi public figure who served in different cabinet posts
- Iyad Mando (born 1978), Syrian footballer
- Iyad Rahwan (born 1978), Syrian-Australian scientist
- Iyad Sughayer (born 1993), Jordanian-Palestinian classical pianist
- Iyad Khalil Zaki (1944–2013), Iraqi Army General

== See also ==
- Iyad (tribe), Arab tribe, 3rd–7th centuries
- Eyad
- Ibn Iyad (disambiguation)
