= Ayaz =

Ayaz may refer to:

- Ayaz (name), a given name and surname
- Ayaz, East Azerbaijan, Iran
- Ayask or Ayāz, a city in Iran
- Ayaz, Mustafakemalpaşa, Turkey
- Ayaz, Yenişehir, Turkey
- Ayaz, Çorum
