= Ayaz (name) =

Ayaz, Iyaz, or Ayas (Ottoman Turkish: ایاز, romanized: Ayāz; Turkish: Ayaz), meaning cool breeze, is both a surname and a masculine given name. The latter use was common in the Ghaznavid and Seljuk empires. The Turkic-origin Ayaz should not be confused with the Arabic-derived name Ayyad/Ayyaz (عیاض), though the latter is also sometimes transliterated as Ayaz, such as with Ayaz Marhoni or Ayaz Ishaqi. Notable people with the name include:

== Surname ==
- Fareed Ayaz (born 1952), Pakistani Qawwal
- Ferhad Ayaz (born 1994), Swedish football player
- Mahmood Ayaz (born 1960), Pakistani surgeon
- Malik Ayaz (993–1041), Georgian slave
- Shaikh Ayaz (1923–1997), Pakistani poet
- Aliza Ayaz, Emirati United Nations Ambassador

== Given name ==
- Ayaz ahmes (born 1986), Indian television actor
- Ayaz Akhmetshin (born 2002), Russian professional Valorant player better known as nAts
- Ayaz Amir, Pakistani journalist
- Ayaz Khan (born 1979), Indian actor
- Ayaz Memon (born 1955), Indian journalist,
- Aya Mütallibov (1938–2022), Soviet politician

== See also ==
- Ayas (disambiguation)
