= Ayas =

Ayas may refer to:

== Ayas ==
- Ayas (Sanskrit: आयस, lit. 'metal; copper; iron'), see history of metallurgy in the Indian subcontinent
- Ayas, a former name of the ancient city of Aegeae and medieval Ajazzo or Laiazzo, now Yumurtalık, Adana Province, Turkey
- Ayas, Aosta Valley, a comune in the Aosta Valley region of north-western Italy
- Ayas (film), 2013

== Ayaş ==
- Ayaş, Ankara, a district of Ankara Province, Turkey
- Ayaş, Mersin, a village of Mersin Province in Turkey, close to Kızkalesi
- Ayaş Tunnel, railway tunnel under construction in Ayaş, Ankara, which will be Turkey's longest when completed
