= İrfan Can Kahveci =

Turkish footballer

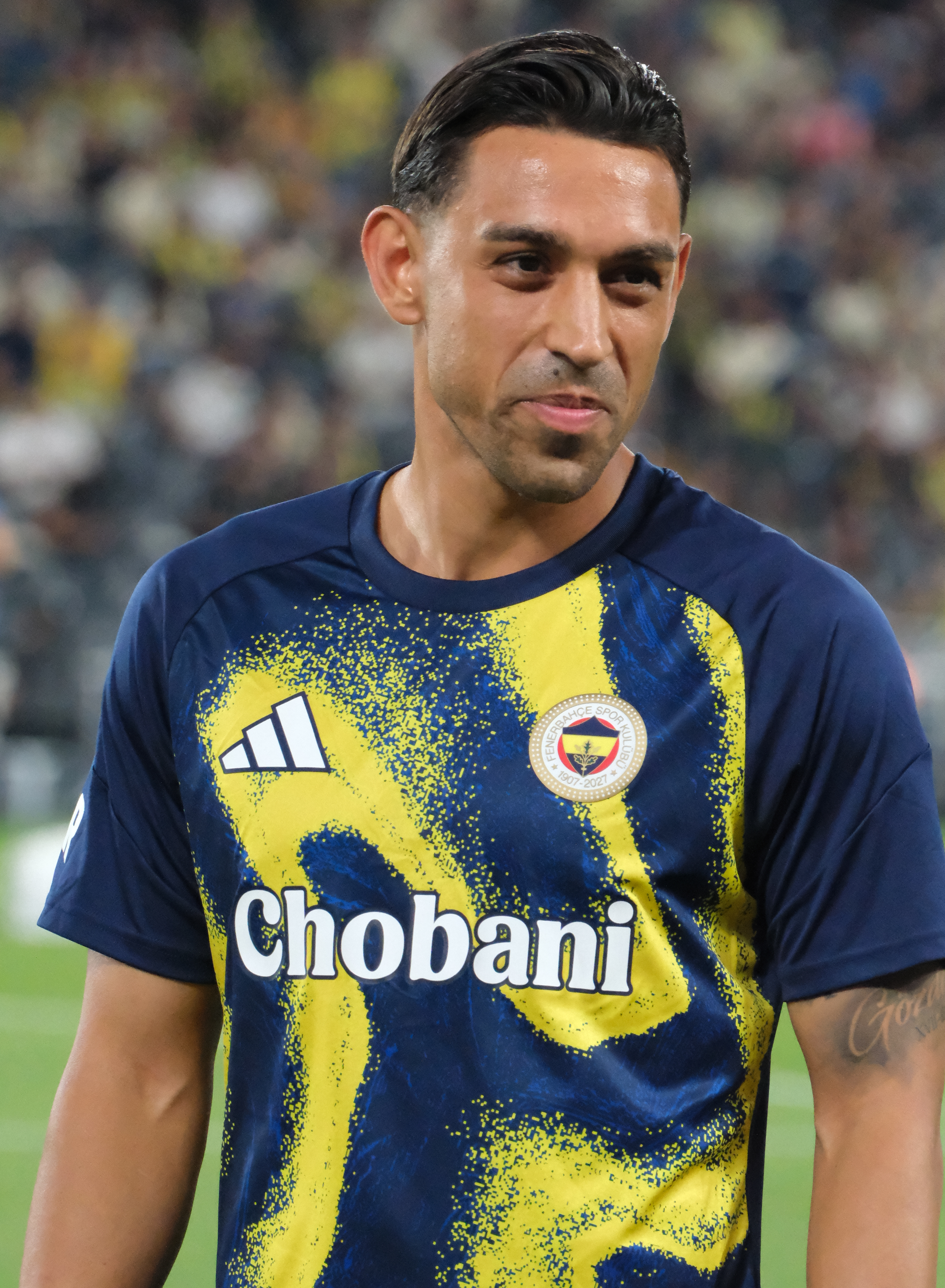
- Kahveci playing for Fenerbahçe in 2026

Personal information
- Full name: İrfan Can Kahveci
- Date of birth: 15 July 1995 (age 31)
- Place of birth: Bayat, Ayaş, Ankara, Turkey
- Height: 1.76 m (5 ft 9 in)
- Positions: Attacking midfielder; winger

Team information
- Current team: Fenerbahçe
- Number: 17

Youth career
- 2005–2012: Gençlerbirliği

Senior career*
Years	Team	Apps	(Gls)
2012–2016	Gençlerbirliği	71	(9)
2013–2014	→ Hacettepe (loan)	34	(4)
2017–2021	İstanbul Başakşehir	116	(12)
2021–	Fenerbahçe	138	(26)
2026	→ Kasımpaşa (loan)	16	(2)

International career^{‡}
2012	Turkey U17	7	(1)
2013	Turkey U18	4	(0)
2014	Turkey U20	3	(0)
2015–2016	Turkey U21	12	(0)
2018–	Turkey	49	(6)
- * Club domestic league appearances and goals as of 8 November 2026 ‡ National team caps and goals as of 5 October 2026

İrfan Can Kahveci (born 15 July 1995) is a Turkish professional footballer who plays as an attacking midfielder or a winger for Süper Lig club Fenerbahçe and the Turkey national team.

== Club career ==
=== Early career ===
He started playing football at Gençlerbirliği Football School at the age of 7. After the years he spent at the football school, İrfan entered the Gençlerbirliği youth team by showing himself in the selections. He signed a professional contract with Gençlerbirliği during the Fuat Çapa period. On 27 April 2012, Kahveci played in the last 5 minutes of the match against Kayserispor for the first for the club in the Spor Toto Cup match.

==== Hacettepe (loan) ====
In the 2013-2014 season, he loaned to Hacettepe, the satellite team of Gençlerbirliği, to gain experience. Kahveci, who scored 4 goals in 34 matches here and contributed to Hacettepe's promotion to the TFF Second League at the end of the 2013-2014 season.

=== Gençlerbirliği ===
On 29 August 2014, Irfan Can made his Süper Lig debut for the first team against Rizespor during the 2014–15 season. On 9 November 2014, he scored his first league goal in the 63rd minute against Kasımpaşa. He finished the season with 6 goals in 30 matches in league and cup competitions.

In his second season with Gençlerbirliği he amassed 3 goals in 33 matches in all competitions.

=== İstanbul Başakşehir ===
On 26 December 2016, Kahveci signed a contract with İstanbul Başakşehir until the end of 2021-22 season. On 14 January 2016, he made his debut with the team against Kayserispor as a substitute, Başakşehir won the match 5-0.

On 19 September 2017, he made his continental debut against Hoffenheim in a UEFA Europa League away match, they lost 3-1.

On 2 December 2020, he scored a hat-trick against RB Leipzig in the UEFA Champions League. His team, however, lost the match 3–4. It made him only the third player to score a hat-trick in a losing cause in the Champions League, after Ronaldo and Gareth Bale.

=== Fenerbahçe ===
On 31 January 2021, Fenerbahçe announced via Twitter that Kahveci joined the team. He signed a four-and-a-half-year contract with Fenerbahçe for a €7 million fee.

On 4 March 2021, he made his debut against Antalyaspor at the Şükrü Saracoğlu Stadium, Süper Lig match tied 1–1. On 30 October 2021, he scored his first goal against Konyaspor, Fenerbahçe lost 2–1.

In 2023–24 season, he made a very strong start with new coach and team's local legend İsmail Kartal and became one of the key players who took more responsibility on the field. He scored 12 goals in 31 Süper Lig matches and 6 goals in 14 UEFA Conference League matches.

On 26 October 2023, he wore a Fenerbahçe jersey for the 100th time in all competitions against Ludogorets Razgrad in UEFA Europa Conference League Group H third week match, Fenerbahçe won 3–1 in Şükrü Saracoğlu Stadium.

On 12 January 2025, Fenerbahçe announced that they had signed a three-year contract with Kahveci until June 2028.

On 8 November 2026, in his 200th match with Fenerbahçe, he scored a brace against Çorum F.K. in a 5-0 away Süper Lig game.

== International career ==
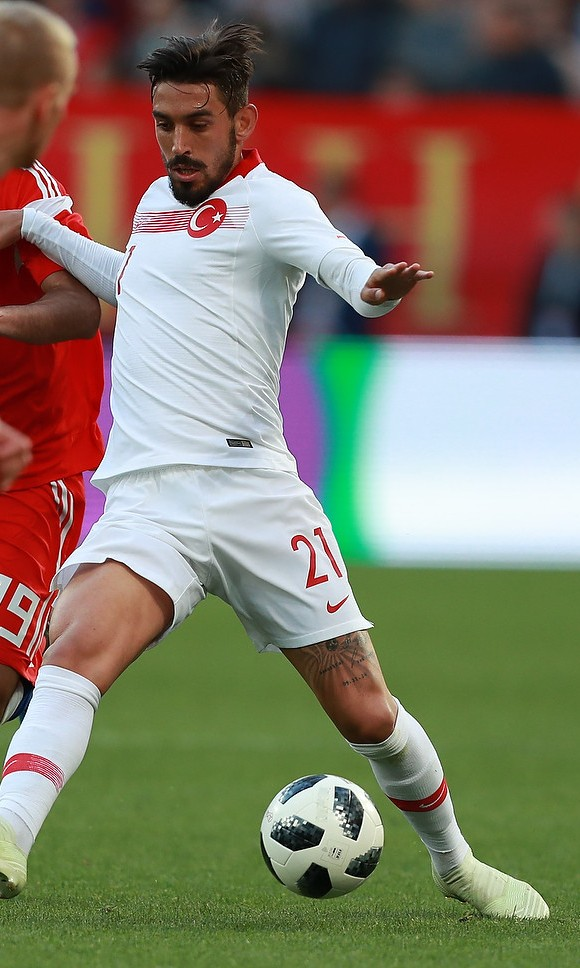
Kahveci playing for Turkey in 2018

Kahveci was called up by manager Fatih Terim for Turkey's friendly match against Russia on 31 August 2016 and subsequent World Cup 2018 qualifier against Croatia. He made a debut in the national team on 23 March 2018 in a 1–0 win against Ireland. In his second match in June 2019, a friendly against Uzbekistan, he had a chance to score his first international goal, but he missed a 90th-minute penalty kick. Turkey still won the game 2–0 courtesy of a brace from Zeki Çelik.

On 2 June 2026, Kahveci was selected in the 26-man squad for the 2026 FIFA World Cup.

== Playing style ==
In his early years at Gençlerbirliği, he played as a left-back position and then, his loan period at Hacettepe and senior career with Gençlerbirliği, Kahveci was deployed in several positions, most notably as a deep-lying midfielder and a wide midfielder primarily on the right side as he was deemed too small to play in the middle of the park. After transfers to İstanbul Başakşehir in the 2016–17 season, manager Abdullah Avcı inserted Kahveci into the playmaker role, where his vision, passing, technical skill and ability to read and understand the game suited him. Since that season, Kahveci was primarily deployed in the position or as a central attacking midfielder at both club and international level. The player personally said that playing central midfield was his preference.

As a result of his versatility, Kahveci could also function on the wing and spent the majority of his career at Fenerbahçe, occupying the role in the team's 4–3–3 formation. His close control with the ball, speed, dribbling, crossing and shots from outside the box, which resulted in former manager İsmail Kartal deploying Kahveci in the role during the player's situation at the club.

== Career statistics ==
=== Club ===
As of match played 8 November 2026

Appearances and goals by club, season and competition
Club	Season	League			Turkish Cup		Europe		Other		Total	
Club	Season	Division	Apps	Goals	Apps	Goals	Apps	Goals	Apps	Goals	Apps	Goals
Hacettepe (loan)	2013–14	TFF Third League	34	4	4	2	–		–		38	6
Gençlerbirliği	2014–15	Süper Lig	24	5	6	1	–		–		30	6
Gençlerbirliği	2015–16	Süper Lig	32	3	1	1	–		–		33	4
Gençlerbirliği	2016–17	Süper Lig	15	1	1	0	–		–		16	1
Gençlerbirliği	Total		71	9	8	2	0	0	0	0	79	11
İstanbul Başakşehir	2016–17	Süper Lig	12	1	4	0	–		–		16	1
İstanbul Başakşehir	2017–18	Süper Lig	25	1	4	1	4 (Note: Appearances in UEFA Europa League)	0	–		33	2
İstanbul Başakşehir	2018–19	Süper Lig	32	4	3	0	2	0	–		37	4
İstanbul Başakşehir	2019–20	Süper Lig	29	4	0	0	10 (Note: One appearances in UEFA Champions League, nine appearances and two goals in UEFA Europa League)	2	–		39	6
İstanbul Başakşehir	2020–21	Süper Lig	18	2	1	1	6 (Note: Appearances in UEFA Champions League)	3	0	0	25	6
İstanbul Başakşehir	Total		116	12	12	2	22	5	0	0	150	19
Fenerbahçe	2020–21	Süper Lig	12	0	0	0	–		–		12	0
Fenerbahçe	2021–22	Süper Lig	24	4	1	0	4	0	–		29	4
Fenerbahçe	2022–23	Süper Lig	27	4	5	0	10 (Note: Two appearances in UEFA Champions League, eight appearances and two goals in UEFA Europa League)	3	–		42	7
Fenerbahçe	2023–24	Süper Lig	31	12	1	0	14 (Note: Appearances in UEFA Europa Conference League)	6	0	0	46	18
Fenerbahçe	2024–25	Süper Lig	26	2	2	0	14 (Note: Four appearances and one goal in UEFA Champions League, ten appearances in UEFA Europa League)	1	–		42	3
Fenerbahçe	2025–26	Süper Lig	8	0	0	0	4 (Note: Two appearances in UEFA Champions League, two appearances in UEFA Europa League)	0	0	0	12	0
Fenerbahçe	2026–27	Süper Lig	10	5	0	0	6	0	0	0	16	5
Fenerbahçe	Total		138	27	9	0	52	10	0	0	200	37
Kasımpaşa (loan)	2025–26	Süper Lig	16	2	–		–		–		16	2
Career total			374	53	34	6	74	15	0	0	482	75

=== International ===
As of match played 5 October 2026

Appearances and goals by national team and year
National team	Year	Apps	Goals
Turkey
Turkey	2018	6	0
Turkey	2019	8	0
Turkey	2020	3	0
Turkey	2021	4 (Note: Three appearances and one goal in UEFA Euro 2020)	1
Turkey	2022	3	0
Turkey	2023	6	1
Turkey	2024	7 (Note: One appearance in UEFA Euro 2024)	2
Turkey	2025	7	2
Turkey	2026	5 (Note: One appearance in 2026 FIFA World Cup)	0
Total		49	6

Scores and results list Turkey's goal tally first.

List of international goals scored by İrfan Can Kahveci
No.	Date	Venue	Cap	Opponent	Score	Result	Competition	Ref.
1	20 June 2021	Baku Olympic Stadium, Baku, Azerbaijan	21	Switzerland	1–2	1–3	UEFA Euro 2020	
2	16 June 2023	Skonto Stadium, Riga, Latvia	25	Latvia	3–2	3–2	UEFA Euro 2024 qualifying	
3	11 October 2024	Samsun 19 Mayıs Stadium, Samsun, Turkey	36	Montenegro	1–0	1–0	2024–25 UEFA Nations League B	
4	15 October 2024	Laugardalsvöllur, Reykjavík, Iceland	37	Iceland	1–1	4–2	2024–25 UEFA Nations League B	
5	20 March 2025	Rams Park, Istanbul, Turkey	38	Hungary	3–1	3–1	2024–25 UEFA Nations League promotion/relegation play-offs	
6	11 October 2025	Vasil Levski National Stadium, Sofia, Bulgaria	43	Bulgaria	6–1	6–1	2026 FIFA World Cup qualification	

== Honours ==
=== Club ===
İstanbul Başakşehir

- Süper Lig: 2019–20

Fenerbahçe

- Turkish Cup: 2022–23

=== Individual ===
- Turkish Footballer of the Year: 2020
- Süper Lig Team of the Season: 2021–22, 2022–23
