= Gökler =

Gökler may refer to the following settlements in Turkey:

- Gökler, Ayaş, a neighbourhood in Ankara Province
- Gökler, Bayburt, a village in Bayburt Province
- Gökler, Gediz, a town in Kütahya Province
- Gökler, Ortaköy, a village in Aksaray Province
