= Gençali =

Gençali is a Turkish place name and it may refer to

- Gençali, Dinar a village in Dinar district of Afyonkarahisar Province
- Gençali, Ayaş a village in Ayaş district of Ankara Province
- Gençali, Polatlı a village in Polatlı district of Ankara Province
- Gençali, Bartın a village in the central district of Bartın Province
- Gençali, Mut a village in Mut district of Mersin Province
- Gençali, Yeşilova
