= Ayyad =

Ayyad is a surname and may refer to:

- Abbas Ayyad, Bahraini footballer
- Akram Ayyad, Libyan footballer
- Cadi Ayyad or Qadi Ayyad (1083–1149), historical Sunni polymath, theologian, historian, poet, and genealogist
- Janna Jihad Ayyad, Palestinian youth activist
- Maher Ayyad, Bahraini chess player
- Nidal Ayyad, convicted perpetrator of the 1993 World Trade Center bombing
- Rami Ayyad, Palestinian Christian activist kidnapped and killed in the Gaza Strip
- Tina Ayyad, Australian politician

== See also ==
- Ayad
- Eyad
- Hayat (disambiguation)
- Iyad
