= Gökçebağ =

Gökçebağ can refer to:

- Gökçebağ, Ayaş
- Gökçebağ, Burdur
- Gökçebağ, Merzifon
