= Başbereket, Ayaş =

Başbereket
- Neighbourhood
- Location in Turkey Başbereket (Turkey Central Anatolia)
- Coordinates: 40°06′N 32°24′E
- Country: Turkey
- Province: Ankara
- District: Ayaş
- Population (2022): 142
- Time zone: UTC+3 (TRT)

Başbereket is a neighbourhood in the municipality and district of Ayaş, Ankara Province, Turkey. Its population is 142 (2022).
