= Uğurçayırı, Ayaş =

Uğurçayırı
- Neighbourhood
- Location in Turkey Uğurçayırı (Turkey Central Anatolia)
- Coordinates: 40°02′N 32°15′E
- Country: Turkey
- Province: Ankara
- District: Ayaş
- Population (2022): 112
- Time zone: UTC+3 (TRT)

Uğurçayırı is a neighbourhood in the municipality and district of Ayaş, Ankara Province, Turkey. Its population is 112 (2022).
