= Battle of Wadi al-Batin =

1991 battle

Coordinates: 29°10′8″N 46°32′36″E

- Part of the Gulf War
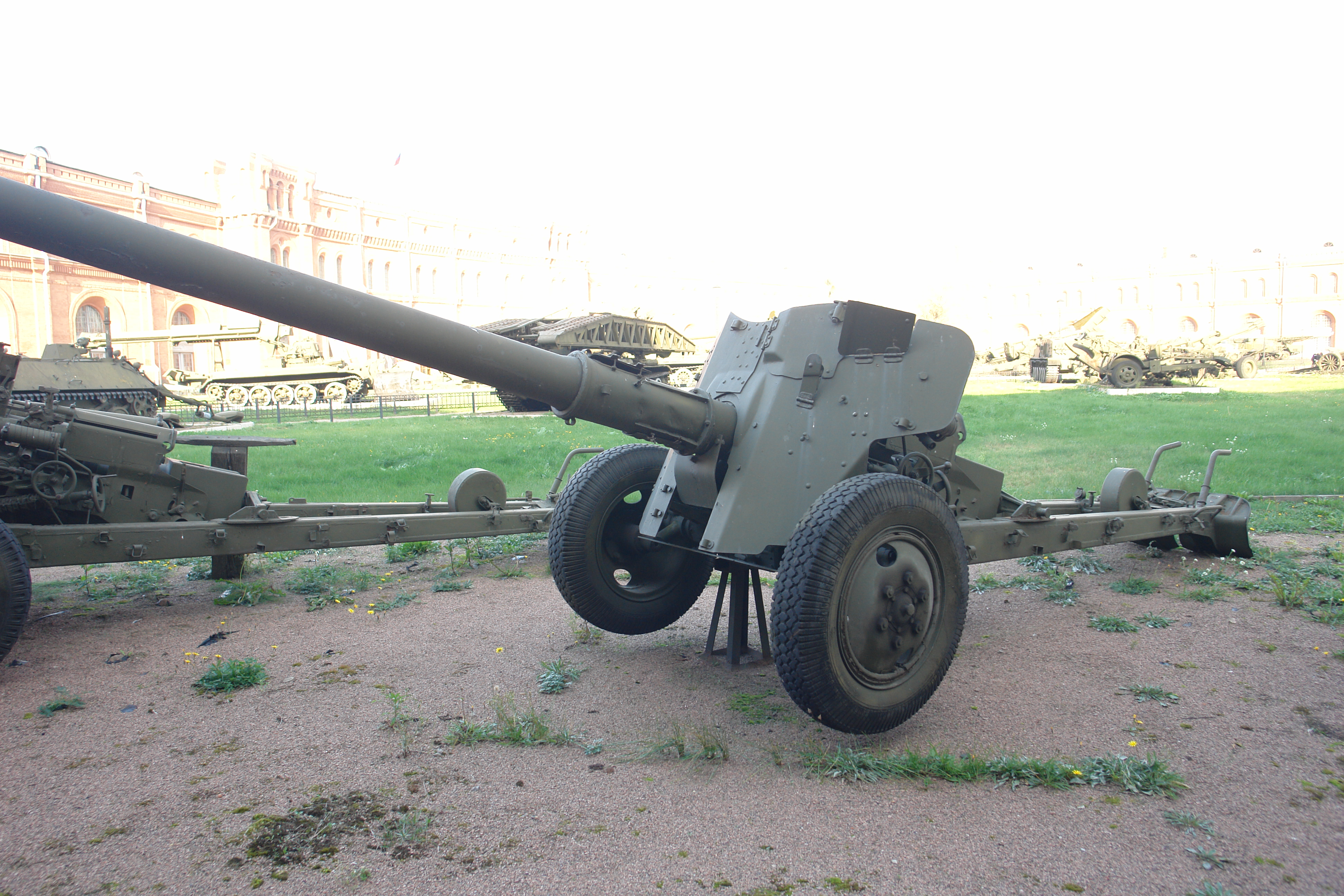
- Soviet-made T-12 Rapira anti-tank gun, the main weapon used by the Iraqis during the battle
Date	15 – 20 February 1991 (5 days)
Location	Iraq
Result	Iraqi victory

Belligerents
United States	(Ba'athist Iraq) Iraq

Commanders and leaders
(United States) Gen. Norman Schwarzkopf (United States) Gen. Fred Franks	(Ba'athist Iraq) Ayad Khalil Zaki

Units involved
1st Cavalry Division; 5th Cavalry Regiment: 1st Squadron; 82nd Field Artillery Regiment: 1st Battalion; Battery B; 3rd Battalion	Mechanised Infantry Reconnaissance Platoon; 52nd Armoured Division; 25th Infantry Division: 72nd Brigade; 103rd Brigade; 31st Infantry Division: 109th Brigade

Casualties and losses
3 killed 9 wounded 1 M1 Abrams damaged 1 Bradley destroyed 1 Bradley damaged 1 M163 VADS destroyed	Killed & wounded unknown 7 captured 5 tanks destroyed 20 artillery pieces destroyed

The Battle of Wadi al-Batin, also known as the Battle of Ruqi Pocket, took place before the beginning of the Desert Storm operations on 16 February 1991. This is not to be confused with the "Battle of Wadi al-Batin" which was fought later in the four-day ground war between elements of the 1st Cavalry Division (United States) and the Iraqi Republican Guard.

The Iraqis thought that Coalition forces were prepping the Wadi al-Batin for the main attack. The desired effect was that the Iraqis would think that the main coalition ground attack would come up the Wadi al-Batin, a natural invasion route, and they would therefore reinforce their forces there, at the expense of the Western flank, where VII Corps would conduct the main attack.

== Deception movements ==
As American forces secretly redeployed from the southern Kuwaiti border to the northwest, "deception cells" were left in the south. These units built a computer-generated electronic network which simulated an intense VHF-UHF wireless traffic. When the Iraqi intelligence caught these "radio calls"—some of them only static hiss—they immediately concluded that the bulk of American forces were still entrenched south of the border. Another military deception was the building of fake bunkers and the shuttling of bogus vehicle convoys, only intended to churn up great clouds of dust. Decoy tanks added to the deception of the unsuspecting Iraqi Army.

== The feint ==
By mid-February, General Frederick M. Franks, Jr. ordered U.S. 1st Cavalry Division to conduct a thrust along the Iraq-Kuwait border. This misdirection would allow the coalition forces to perform the famous "Hail Mary" to the West as the Iraqis focused on the Wadi.

=== Operation Berm Buster ===
On 15 February, TF 1-32 Armor Scout Platoon, supported by the division's 8th Engineers, breached the defensive berm built by the Iraqis on the frontier. The 155 mm M198 howitzers of the Division's 3-82nd Field Artillery Regiment kept the Iraqi positions under fire in the course of this operation, pounding seven pre-established targets. The Iraqis retaliated with sporadic mortar fire.

TF 1-32, along with the Mortar Platoon and elements of D Company, remained in position overnight. They destroyed a border guard post and ambushed an Iraqi reconnaissance patrol, causing at least 3 Iraqi casualties.

=== Operation Red Storm ===
The first phase of the feint was a night attack. Fire support from the 82nd Field Artillery Regiment was required again. The artillery was temporarily reduced to 50% percent when a howitzer was stuck in an antitank ditch, preventing the rest of the convoy from moving ahead. Two soldiers were injured in the accident. Undeterred, the Regiment carried out a precision shelling on an Iraqi radar facility just before 1:00 AM of 16 February. The 82nd immediately moved out of the area after the mission was completed, and a raid by Apache helicopters hit selected targets deep behind the Iraqi lines.

=== Operation Knight Strike ===
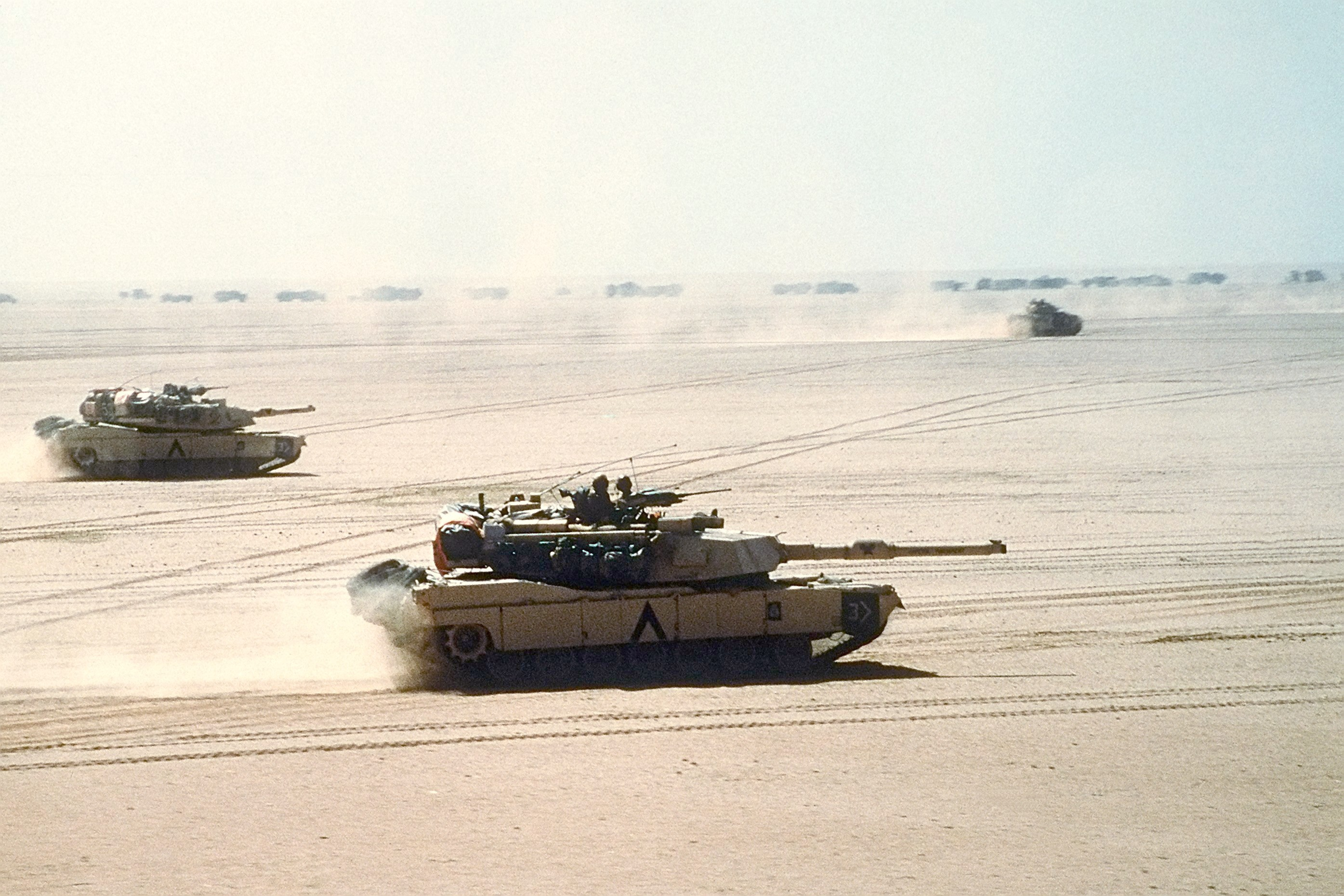
M1 Abrams in the Gulf War

On the evening of 19 February, the 1st Cavalry followed up the artillery attack with a Reconnaissance in Force by Task Force 1-5 CAV (Black Knights) of the 2nd Black Jack Brigade, 1st Cavalry Division. The Task Force consisted two M1A1 Abrams Tank Companies, two M2A2 Bradley Fighting Vehicle Companies, an M901 ITV Anti Tank Company, Command and Control elements from the Headquarters of 2nd Brigade, elements of C Battery 4-5 ADA (Stinger and Vulcan Anti Aircraft Systems) and in a combat trains location, elements of the forward support battalion (C Co medical evac). One of the first reaction of the Iraqis, besides firing sporadic mortar rounds, was to set oil trenches on fire.

On 20 February, 1-5 CAV broke the border berm in two different points, and after evading a minefield they crossed to the west bank of the wadi. Then the troops of the 2nd Brigade maneuvered northwards for six miles. Their orders were "Do not become decisively engaged, and do not attrit your force." At midday, a scout platoon reported that they were exchanging fire with the enemy. Seven Iraqi soldiers surrendered. As reinforcements were pushing forward, the column was ambushed by Iraqi troops using mortars and T-12 anti-tank guns hidden on the reverse slope of a low ridge. Intense direct and indirect fire erupted. The Brigade commander, Col. Randolph House, was personally forced to retreat rearwards after his M113 APC was nearly hit by several shells.

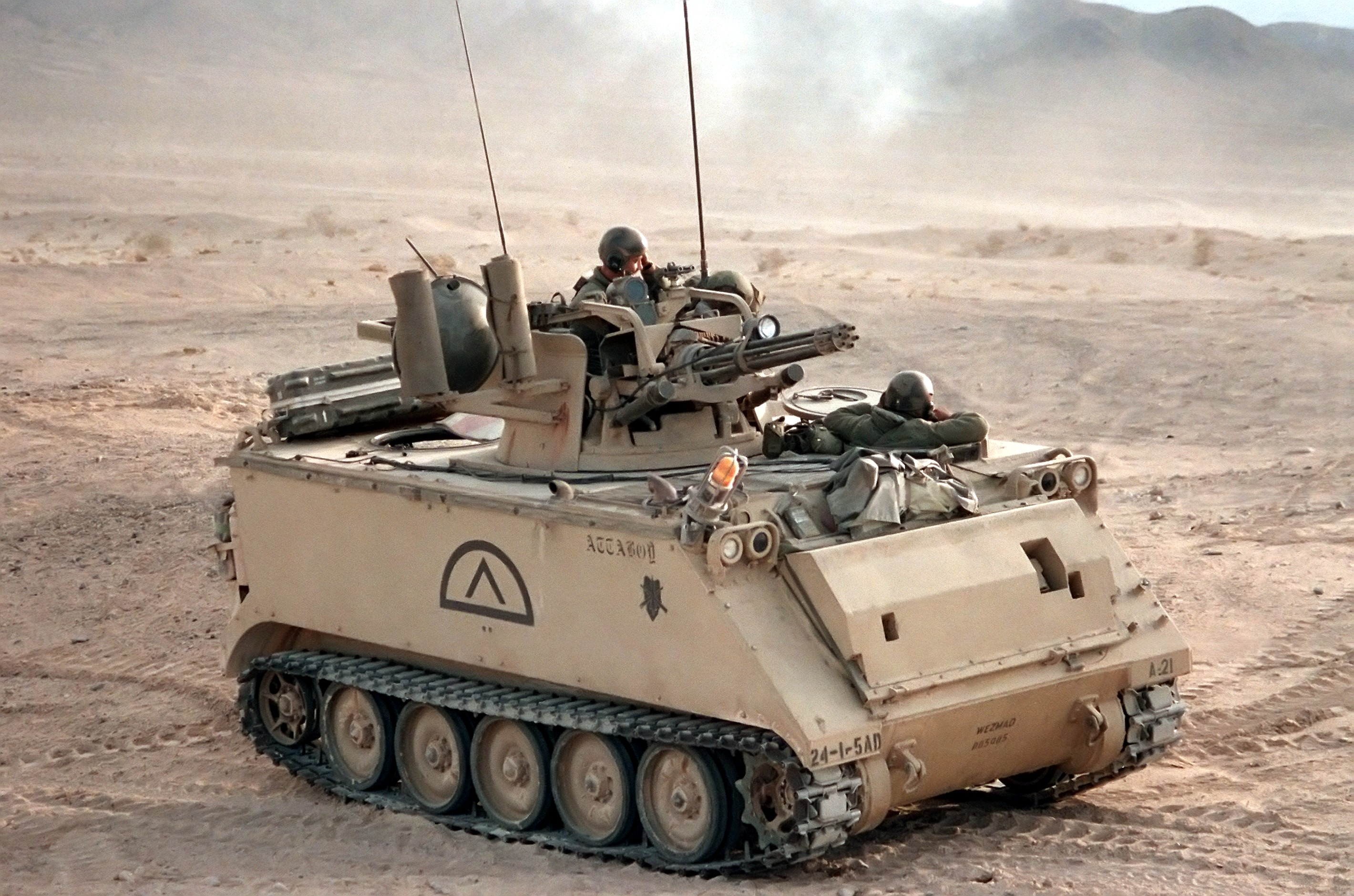
M163 Vulcan AA vehicle

Before a skirmish line could be formed, an M163 Vulcan was destroyed by a 100 mm round. The gunner, Sergeant Jimmy D. Haws, was killed instantly. A M2A2 Bradley IFV spraying 25 mm fire on Iraqi trenches was also hit; its gunner, Sergeant Ronald Randazzo, was killed and two other men were wounded as result. Another Bradley, commanded by Staff Sergeant Christopher Cichon, came forward to evacuate these casualties. While Sergeant Cichon and the soldiers from his Bradley were rescuing wounded personnel from the first Bradley, the Iraqis continued to fire. Private First Class Ardon Cooper covered a wounded man with his own body to shield him from enemy fire and was hit in the neck by a fragment from a mortar round, just as Sergeant Cichon's Bradley was struck on the turret by a round which shattered its TOW launcher, spraying Cooper with shrapnel. He died later from heavy loss of blood. Cooper was posthumously awarded the Silver Star. Cichon's Bradley was still operational, and after picking up the wounded, its crew managed to withdraw it from the line of fire. Staff Sergeant Cichon was awarded the Silver Star for his exceptional leadership and courage while under enemy fire. Upon hearing of the seriousness of the injuries sustained by A Co, Spc Phillip Adkins volunteered along with Sgt Frank Knox of C Co to take the battalion Surgeon Capt Noel moved forward to reach the wounded. However Spc Adkins Humvee transporting Capt Noel took indirect fire which disabled his humvee to the point he had to pull back south of the berm. The battle raged for about an hour; after pounding the Iraqi positions with heavy artillery and A-10 air strikes, 1-5 fell back to the berm. During the pull-out, an Abrams tank hit a mine and was heavily damaged. Its crew was uninjured except for some bruises. The Iraqi defenders lost five tanks and 20 artillery pieces. American casualties amounted to three dead and nine wounded. The wisdom of a full-daylight operation was the subject of some criticism, but the Iraqi army remained convinced that the Coalition invasion would take place from the south.
