= Ilıca, Ayaş =

Ilıca
- Neighbourhood
- Location in Turkey Ilıca (Turkey Central Anatolia)
- Coordinates: 40.0628°N 32.2587°E
- Country: Turkey
- Province: Ankara
- District: Ayaş
- Population (2022): 536
- Time zone: UTC+3 (TRT)

Ilıca is a village in the municipality and district of Ayaş, Ankara Province, Turkey. Its population is 536 (2022).
