= Tekke, Ayaş =

Tekke
- Neighbourhood
- Location in Turkey Tekke (Turkey Central Anatolia)
- Coordinates: 39.9193°N 32.3662°E
- Country: Turkey
- Province: Ankara
- District: Ayaş
- Population (2022): 296
- Time zone: UTC+3 (TRT)

Tekke is a neighbourhood in the municipality and district of Ayaş, Ankara Province, Turkey. Its population is 296 (2022).
