= İlhanköy, Ayaş =

İlhanköy
- Neighbourhood
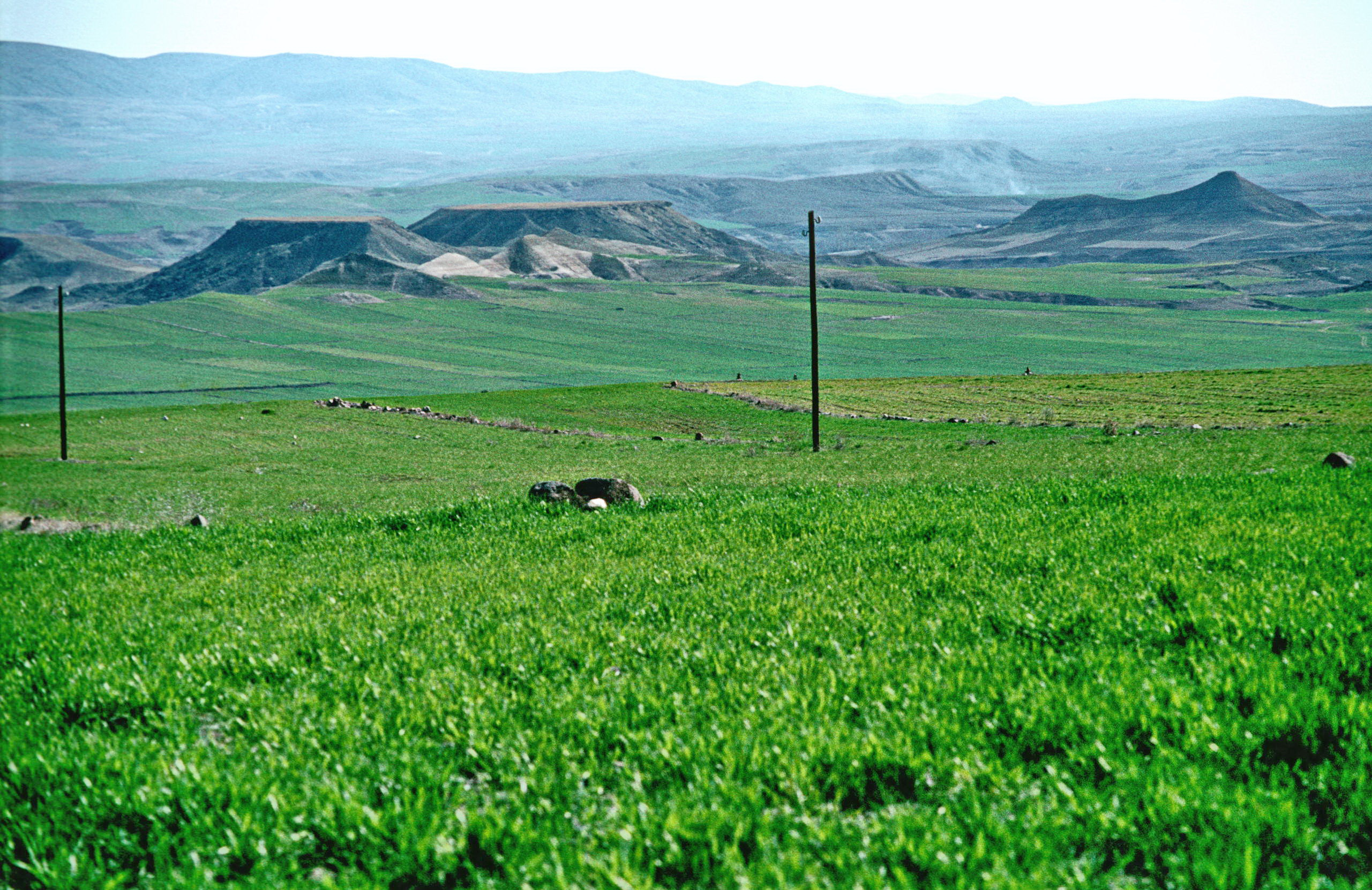

- Location within Turkey Location within Turkey Central Anatolia
- Country: Turkey
- Province: Ankara
- District: Ayaş
- Population (2022): 265
- Time zone: UTC+3 (TRT)

İlhanköy is a neighbourhood in the municipality and district of Ayaş, Ankara Province, Turkey. Its population is 265 (2022).
