= Evci, Ayaş =

Evci
- Neighbourhood
- Location in Turkey Evci (Turkey Central Anatolia)
- Coordinates: 40.2208°N 32.5080°E
- Country: Turkey
- Province: Ankara
- District: Ayaş
- Population (2022): 104
- Time zone: UTC+3 (TRT)

Evci is a neighbourhood in the municipality and district of Ayaş, Ankara Province, Turkey. Its population is 104 (2022).
