= Ortabereket, Ayaş =

Ortabereket
- Neighbourhood
- Location in Turkey Ortabereket (Turkey Central Anatolia)
- Coordinates: 40°08′N 32°25′E
- Country: Turkey
- Province: Ankara
- District: Ayaş
- Population (2022): 342
- Time zone: UTC+3 (TRT)

Ortabereket is a neighbourhood in the municipality and district of Ayaş, Ankara Province, Turkey. Its population is 342 (2022).
