= Feruz, Ayaş =

Feruz
- Neighbourhood
- Country: Turkey
- Province: Ankara
- District: Ayaş
- Population (2022): 200
- Time zone: UTC+3 (TRT)

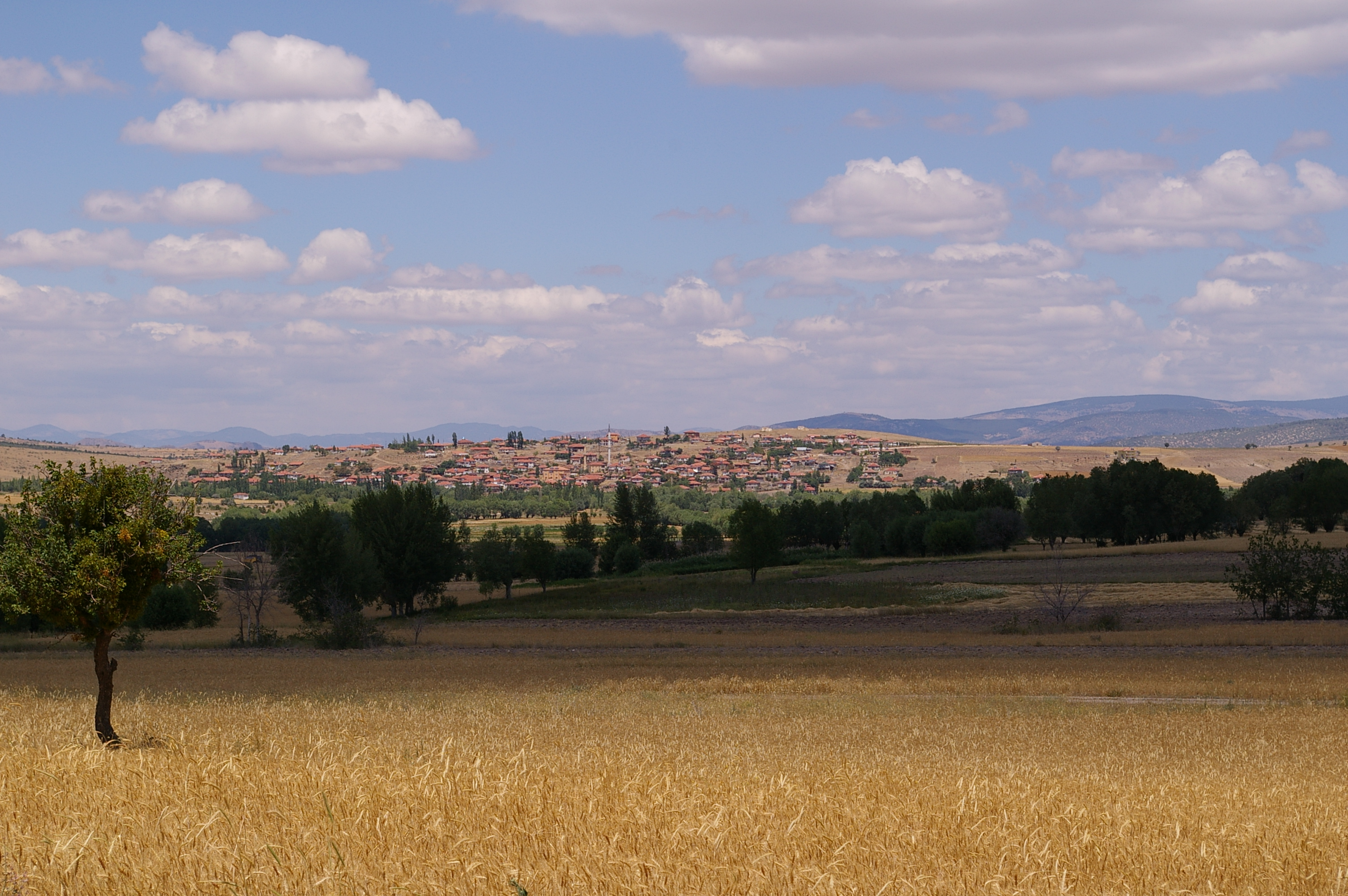
Feruz Village, Ayas district, Ankara Province, Turkey

Feruz is a neighbourhood in the municipality and district of Ayaş, Ankara Province, Turkey. Its population is 200 (2022).
