= Çanıllı Çiğdemci =

- Neighbourhood
- Location in Turkey Çanıllı Çiğdemci (Turkey Central Anatolia)
- Coordinates: 40°10′N 32°25′E
- Country: Turkey
- Province: Ankara
- District: Ayaş
- Population (2022): 345
- Time zone: UTC+3 (TRT)

Çanıllı Çiğdemci is a neighbourhood in the municipality and district of Ayaş, Ankara Province, Turkey. Its population is 345 (2022). Çanıllı was an independent municipality until it was merged into the municipality of Ayaş in 2008.
