= Akkaya, Ayaş =

Akkaya
- Neighbourhood
- Location in Turkey Akkaya (Turkey Central Anatolia)
- Coordinates: 40°5′6″N 32°6′59″E
- Country: Turkey
- Province: Ankara
- District: Ayaş
- Elevation: 582 m (1,909 ft)
- Population (2022): 268
- Time zone: UTC+3 (TRT)
- Postal code: 06710
- Area code: 0312

Akkaya is a neighbourhood in the municipality and district of Ayaş, Ankara Province, Turkey. Its population is 268 (2022).
