= Pınaryaka, Ayaş =

Pınaryaka
- Neighbourhood
- Location in Turkey Pınaryaka (Turkey Central Anatolia)
- Coordinates: 40°11′N 32°29′E
- Country: Turkey
- Province: Ankara
- District: Ayaş
- Population (2022): 232
- Time zone: UTC+3 (TRT)

Pınaryaka is a neighbourhood in the municipality and district of Ayaş, Ankara Province, Turkey. Its population is 232 (2022).
