= Sinanlı Hocasinan =

- Neighbourhood
- Location in Turkey Sinanlı Hocasinan (Turkey Central Anatolia)
- Coordinates: 39.9969°N 32.2880°E
- Country: Turkey
- Province: Ankara
- District: Ayaş
- Population (2022): 510
- Time zone: UTC+3 (TRT)

Sinanlı Hocasinan is a neighbourhood in the municipality and district of Ayaş, Ankara Province, Turkey. Its population is 510 (2022). Sinanlı was an independent municipality until it was merged into the municipality of Ayaş in 2008.
