= Yağmurdede, Ayaş =

Yağmurdede
- Neighbourhood
- Location in Turkey Yağmurdede (Turkey Central Anatolia)
- Coordinates: 40°08′N 32°20′E
- Country: Turkey
- Province: Ankara
- District: Ayaş
- Population (2022): 223
- Time zone: UTC+3 (TRT)

Yağmurdede is a neighbourhood in the municipality and district of Ayaş, Ankara Province, Turkey. Its population is 223 (2022).
