= Ulupınar, Ayaş =

Ulupınar
- Neighbourhood
- Location in Turkey Ulupınar (Turkey Central Anatolia)
- Coordinates: 40.1122°N 32.3473°E
- Country: Turkey
- Province: Ankara
- District: Ayaş
- Population (2022): 63
- Time zone: UTC+3 (TRT)

Ulupınar is a neighbourhood in the municipality and district of Ayaş, Ankara Province, Turkey. Its population is 63 (2022).
