= Başayaş, Ayaş =

Başayaş
- Neighbourhood
- Location in Turkey Başayaş (Turkey Central Anatolia)
- Coordinates: 40°02′N 32°23′E
- Country: Turkey
- Province: Ankara
- District: Ayaş
- Population (2022): 197
- Time zone: UTC+3 (TRT)

Başayaş is a neighbourhood in the municipality and district of Ayaş, Ankara Province, Turkey. Its population is 197 (2022).
