= Bayat, Ayaş =

Bayat
- Neighbourhood
- Location in Turkey Bayat (Turkey Central Anatolia)
- Coordinates: 40.1850°N 32.4370°E
- Country: Turkey
- Province: Ankara
- District: Ayaş
- Population (2022): 171
- Time zone: UTC+3 (TRT)

Bayat is a neighbourhood in the municipality and district of Ayaş, Ankara Province, Turkey. Its population is 171 (2022).
