= Ayaş Tunnel =

Railway tunnel under construction in Turkey

- Interactive map of Ayaş Tunnel

Overview
- Other name: Ayaş Tüneli
- Location: Ayaş, Ankara Province, Turkey
- Coordinates: 40°00′07″N 32°22′34″E
- Status: Under construction
- System: Turkish State Railways (TCDD)

Operation
- Constructed: Nurol Construction
- Operator: TCDD
- Character: railway tunnel

Technical
- Length: 10.064 km (6.253 mi)

Location of Ayaş Tunnel in Turkey.

The Ayaş Tunnel (Turkish: Ayaş Tüneli) is a railway tunnel under construction near Ayaş town of Ankara Province in Central Anatolia, Turkey. It was initially projected to shorten the railway line connecting Ankara with Istanbul.

== Background ==
The construction of Ayaş Tunnel was planned in 1943 as part of a higher-speed rail service project. The 10 km (6.2 mi)-long tunnel would enable the railway ministry to shorten the distance of 576 km (358 mi) between Istanbul and Ankara by about 160 km (99 mi) to 416 km (258 mi). The travel time would reduce from seven-and-a-half hours to two-and-a-half hours.

After 33 years of suspension, the project came into force in 1976 when groundbreaking took place in the presence of Prime Minister Süleyman Demirel on the western entrance at the Ayaş side of the mountains. The next year in 1977, Deputy Prime Minister Necmettin Erbakan initiated the digging work at the tunnel's opposite entrance in the east near Erkeksu village. At that time, it was announced that the construction of the 10.064 km (6.253 mi)-long tunnel would be completed in seven years.

After the 1980 military coup, the construction works at the tunnel did not progress as expected, although it was taken several times into consideration by the government. Prime Minister Turgut Özal, who came into power following the 1983 general election, was a pro-highway and an anti-railway politician. He delayed the building of the railway tunnel. In the meantime, the construction of the Istanbul–Ankara O-4 motorway began. After completion of the motorway, discussions about the railway systems intensified, leading to the revival of the Ayaş Tunnel. In 1987, the transport ministry decided to update its studies of the Ayaş Tunnel Project.

Bidding consortiums from France, Germany, Italy, United Kingdom and Belgium submitted tenders proposing the project's realization by financing through foreign loans instead of the unattractive build-operate-transfer method. The tunnel project resumed when Süleyman Demirel became prime minister again in 1991. The construction works accelerated with more government funding, however these efforts did not suffice to complete the 10 km (6.2 mi)-long tunnel. The tunnel was bored to a length of 8 km (5.0 mi) until the Justice and Development Party (AKP) took over the government following the 2002 general election. At that time, the total expenditures amounted to ₺701 million.

The Minister of Transport, Maritime and Communication Binali Yıldırım stopped the high-speed rail project of Istanbul-Ankara and hence the Ayaş Tunnel construction. The entrance to the tunnel was closed, and ashes were dumped in piles in front of both tunnel entrances. For the management of the groundwater that seeped into the tunnel, ₺200–300 thousand had to be spent annually. The total cost for the tunnel's maintenance amounted to ₺2.9 million between 2001 and 2012.

== Current state ==
In 2010, the Department of Railways, Harbors and Airports (DLH) undertook studies on the high-speed rail project between Ankara and Ayaş, the 85 km (53 mi)-long section of the initial Ankara–Istanbul railway line project, which had come to a standstill. That project had already undergone a revision to a line between Ankara and Arifiye only. The new project envisaged rehabilitation of the railway line section, suitable for a speed of 250 km/h (160 mph). The budget for the extra works was estimated at around ₺150 million. The opening of the line was seen as important for the development of tourism in the region, and would enable the transportation of one-million tons of trona mineral annually from Çayırhan mine.

The study found out that the railway infrastructure between Çayırhan and Sincan did not meet the standard requirements of high-speed rail. It appeared that the cross section of the tunnel was insufficient to withstand the aerodynamic pressure of the high-speed rail even though the other railway infrastructure would have been improved.

The ministry announced in February 2013 that studies were being conducted for the resumption of boring work for the remaining 2 km (1.2 mi) section of the tunnel. With the realization of the tunnel project and opening of the railway line, a railway station will be built in Beypazarı town.

== Technical details ==
Nurol Construction began the construction of the tunnel in 1976. In 2012, the same company took over the project's realization.

When completed, the Ayaş Tunnel will be Turkey's longest railway tunnel with its length of 10.064 km (6.253 mi). The lined inner diameter of the tunnel is 9.60 m (31.5 ft). Its cross section is horseshoe shaped. The tunnel's 400 m (1,300 ft)-long section is constructed by cut-and-cover method while for the main part of 8,000 m (26,000 ft) the New Austrian Tunnelling method was applied.
