= Binu Sasidharan =

Indian film maker (born 1976)

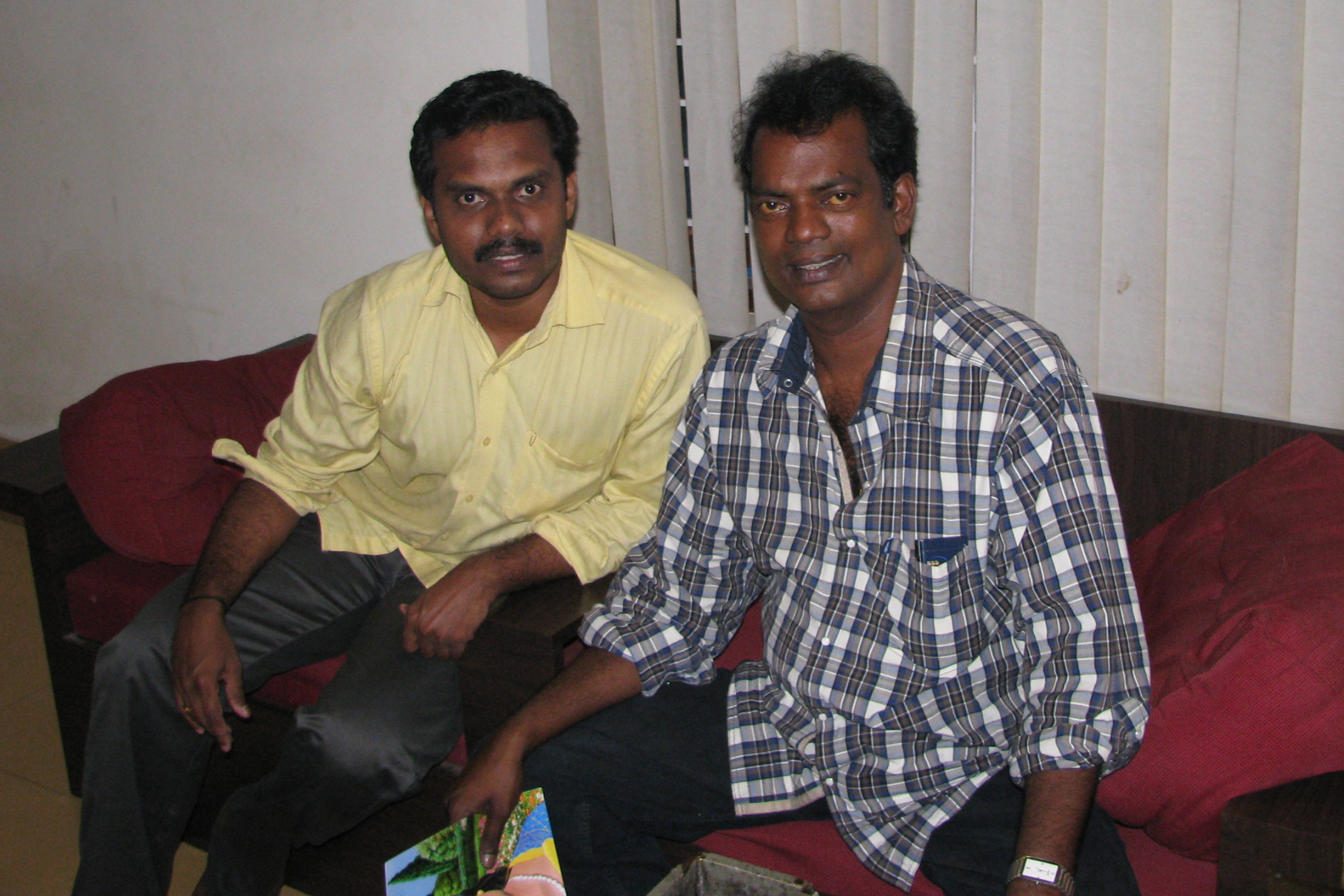
- Binu Sasidharan with National award winner Salim Kumar during the production of Malayalam Film Once Upon a Time
- Born: 17 November 1976 (age 50); Aluva, Kerala
- Occupations: Film director, Independent Consultant
- Years active: 2008 – present
- Spouse: Ambika Binu

Binu Sasidharan (born 17 November 1976) is an Indian film maker known for his work in the Malayalam Film industry. He made his debut feature film Once Upon a Time (2013 film) which is being touted as Malayalam's first full-length animated feature film. Binu, has previously directed on an animated version of film CID Moosa (CID Moosa 007 for home video) and more recently he was the maker of Malayalam's first animated stereoscopic 3D video film for home theaters named Kuttichathan.

== Early life ==
Binu was born in Desam, Aluva in Eranakulam Dist., Kerala. He completed his post graduation in commerce from Sree Sankara College, Kalady 1999.

== Career ==
In 1999 after his studies, Binu started his career as a freelance designer and animator. In 2002 for a short term he also worked as a Guest tutor (web), at Union Christian College, Aluva. In 2004 he joined USA based MNC as Graphic Designer and later in the year 2005 he started own animation studio Wireframe animation in his own home town and at the same time started working as independent Creative consultant. In his short career of around 14 years he has worked for various Films, Advertising and Television

== Filmography ==
- Once Upon a Time (2013)
- CID Moosa 007
- Kuttichathan

== See also ==
- Indian animation industry
