= Ibn Iyad =

Ibn ʿIyād may refer to:

- Kulthum ibn Iyad al-Qushayri (died 741), governor of Ifriqiya under the Umayyads
- al-Fudayl ibn Iyad (died 803), Sunni scholar
- Abu Muhammad Abd Allah ibn Iyad (died 1147), Andalusi military leader
