= Once Upon a Time (2013 film) =

Once Upon A Time
- Directed by: Binu Sasidharan
- Written by: Anil Perumbalam
- Produced by: Antony K. L.; Vipin Selvaraj; Manu V. Mathews
- Starring: Salim Kumar; Mala Aravindan
- Music by: Bijibal
- Release date: 24 May 2013
- Running time: 100 minutes
- Country: India
- Language: Malayalam

Once Upon A Time is a 2013 Malayalam animated film, directed by Binu Sasidharan and starring Salim Kumar and Mala Aravindan. Released on 24 May 2013, it is the first animated feature film to be produced in the Malayalam language, and it is Binu's first feature film, opting for a wide theatrical release rather than through domestic release as with his previous works.

== Plot ==
A sage gives Rahul a book containing various chants and spells. When Rahul reads the book, he is enchanted by a magic king and is magically transported with his doll, Kunjan, to a new world which mirrors the existence of the magic kingdom. Rahul is puzzled and decides to try to discern where he and Kunjan have been transported. During his investigations, he becomes entangled in a great conflict between the evil forces of the Black Magician and a power-hungry minister. Throughout the film, it becomes clear that Rahul must be the one to save the magic kingdom from these villains.

== Cast ==
- Salim Kumar as the Cunning Minister
- Mala Aravindan as Sage
- Machan Varghese as Kandakan
- Narayankutty as Jamandakan

== Production ==
Once Upon A Time is the first Indian film to use animated models of real actors. Salim Kumar and Mala Aravindan were cast to play the voices of the lead roles. Once Upon a Time is the second regional language animated film to be created in India, the first being Hindi. In making the movie, director Binu Sasidharan stated that his intent in releasing the film to cinemas was to "make something new and relatable to children".

The film was produced by FX3 Productions in association with VIPs International. The developers opted to use gaming technology rather than conventional software for the movie, using applications produced by Daz 3D and iClone software for character modelling and animation. The screenplay was written by Anil Perumbalam. Music director Bijibal composed five songs for the film as well as the original background score. The five songs were performed by Sujatha, Shweta Mohan and Rajesh Ravindran, with lyrics written by Dr. Valsala Vijayana and Anil Perumbalam.

== See also ==
- Indian animation industry
- List of Indian animated feature films
- List of Malayalam films of 2013
