= Gençali, Ayaş =

Gençali
- Neighbourhood
- Location in Turkey Gençali (Turkey Central Anatolia)
- Coordinates: 39.8938°N 32.0008°E
- Country: Turkey
- Province: Ankara
- District: Ayaş
- Population (2022): 466
- Time zone: UTC+3 (TRT)

Gençali is a neighbourhood in the municipality and district of Ayaş, Ankara Province, Turkey. Its population is 466 (2022).
