= Ayaz Memon =

Indian writer, journalist, columnist and author (born 1955)

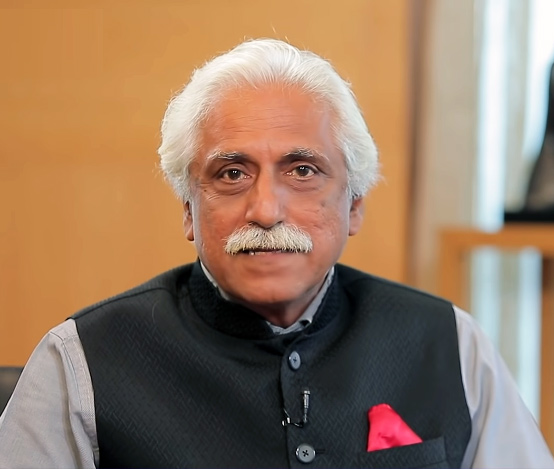
- Memon in 2019
- Born: 3 August 1955 (age 70); Bridgeport, Connecticut, US
- Occupations: Journalist, writer, columnist, author
- Years active: 1980–present
- Spouse: Amberin Memon
- Children: 2

Ayaz Memon (born 3 August 1955) is an Indian sports writer, journalist, columnist, author and former lawyer. He was born in Bridgeport, Connecticut.

== Early life ==
Ayaz was born to a Memon family in 1955. His father was an attorney. He went on to graduate in economics and law from Bombay University. He started his career as sports writer and went on to edit newspapers like Mid-Day, Bombay Times and DNA apart from being editor of Sportsweek magazine and sports editor of the Times of India and the Independent at various stages. His passion for cricket influenced his decision not to follow in his father’s footsteps as a lawyer.

== Career ==
After graduating in economics and law from Bombay University, Ayaz pursued journalism as a career after a chance job with Sportsweek magazine in 1978 while still at law school. He went on to edit newspapers like Mid-Day, Bombay Times and DNA apart from being editor of Sportsweek magazine and sports editor of the Times of India and the Independent at various stages. He is now consulting editor with NewsX and a columnist with Hindustan Times, Mint, Mail Today, Deccan Chronicle and occasionally Times of India.

In the course of his career Ayaz has covered over 300 Test matches and more than 400 One-Day Internationals all over the world. He has also covered 9 Cricket World Cups, the 2006 FIFA World Cup, the 1988 Olympics, Wimbledon in 1991 and 1993, the 1998 and 2010 Commonwealth Games and the 1990 Asian Games. He also covered the 2015 Cricket World Cup Final on Huffingston Post.

Ayaz Memon's presence in electronic media can be seen through his Twitter account @cricketwallah. He currently does shows such as Firstpost Gameplan where he reviews the IPL matches. Recently, Ayaz has teamed up with a media agency named DigiOsmosis and is starting a sports website named 'Sportswallah.com'. Ayaz also does a daily news FB live bulletin with Sportswallah which can be seen on the 'Sportswallah' FB page. He is also working on an illustrated history of Indian cricket and a script for a film project based on sports and politics in India.

He is one of the few people to have watched Kapil Dev's 175*(138) in India vs Zimbabwe in the 1983 Cricket World Cup live. The crowd size was around 15-20 people and the BBC didn't film or record the match as they were on a single day strike, making him one of the few eye-witnesses of the legendary match.

== Books ==
Ayaz has also authored or co-authored several books such as the Wills Book of Excellence on One-Day Cricket to coincide with the World Cup, Wills Book of Excellence on One-Day Cricket again for the World Cup, Thunder Down Under, about the 1991-92 World Cup, The Best in the World: India’s Ten Greatest World Cup Matches, co-authored with actor and cricket enthusiast, Tom Alter, 2003. He is currently working on an illustrated history of Indian cricket. Ayaz has recently written books such as Sachin Tendulkar: Master Blaster, Virat Kohli: Reliable Rebel, MS Dhoni: Captain Cool and Yuvraj Singh: Powerful Elegance.

== Personal life ==
Ayaz Memon is married to Amberin Memon, who retired as the Chief People Officer from Hexaware Technologies.
