= Gökler, Ayaş =

Gökler
- Neighbourhood
- Location in Turkey Gökler (Turkey Central Anatolia)
- Coordinates: 39.9450°N 32.3913°E
- Country: Turkey
- Province: Ankara
- District: Ayaş
- Population (2022): 258
- Time zone: UTC+3 (TRT)

Gökler is a neighbourhood in the municipality and district of Ayaş, Ankara Province, Turkey. Its population is 258 (2022).
