= Iyad Jamal Al-Din =

Iraqi politician

Ayad Jamal Aldin or Iyad Jamal al-Din (Arabic: إياد جمال الدين), full name Iyad Raouf Mohammed Jamal al-Din (born 1961), is a prominent Iraqi intellectual, politician and religious cleric. He was a member of the Iraqi parliament from 2005 until 2010 as the representative of Nasiriyah and a leading figure in Ayad Allawi's Iraqi National List (Iraqiyya) until his departure in the fall of 2009. After Ayad Allawi sent a delegation to Iran, Ayad Jamal Aldin became disillusioned with Iraqiyya and left the list to form his own party, the Ahrar Party, based on the principles of separation of religion and the state (a principle Iraqiyya ostensibly shares), courage and integrity (principles Ayad Jamal Aldin and his followers feel strongly that Iraqiyya does not share). Speaking of his fallout with Ayad Allawi in a February 14, 2010 interview with Al-Arabiya TV's Suhair Al-Qaisi, Ayad Jamal Aldin said: "Since he (Ayad Allawi) sent a delegation to Iran, he cannot expect my support."

Ayad Jamal Aldin is a Shia cleric, best known for his consistent campaigning for a new, secular Iraq. He first rose to prominence at the Nasiriyah conference in March 2003, shortly before the fall of Saddam Hussein, where he called for a state free of religion, the turban and other theological symbols. In 2005, he was elected as one of the 25 MPs on the Iraqi National List, but withdrew in 2009 after becoming disenchanted with Iyad Allawi’s overtures to Iran. He wants complete independence from Iranian interference in Iraq. He now leads the Ahrar party for the 2010 election to the Council of Representatives, on a policy platform to clean up corruption and create a strong, secure and liberated Iraq for the future.

He was born in Najaf in 1961 which remains home for most of his family, although he now lives in Baghdad. He has several brothers and sisters and his late father was a literary scholar, with over 50 books to his credit, and his uncle was a famous poet: Sayed Mustafa Jamal Aldin. Although he eventually trained as a cleric, he was brought up in an environment where science, culture, poetry and religion were studied hand-in-hand. That is where his belief that our problems are ‘human problems first’, and not Sunni or Turkmen or Kurd problems.

He is on record as saying that his mission is to see an end to the corruption that has seen politicians subvert religion to their own needs, and use their sects to determine their success.

His first public appearance was at the age of 16, when he protested against the state's attempt to prevent other Shias from making a pilgrimage to Karbala. He paid for his protest with his freedom, being exiled to Syria and later Iran, where he studied the Qur'an and shari'a for eight years and earned his master's degree in Philosophy. He is on record saying that he does not want a secular state in order to reduce the role of God in people's lives; he wants to liberate religion from the state. He wants to see an end to the political sectarianism that puts Kurd against Shia and Turkmen against Sunni, believing that "we have a shared history, and we have a shared destiny." He has consistently argued that freedom, tolerance and security walk hand-in-hand.

He is the father of six children – three boys and three girls.

After Ahrar and other lists concerned about Iranian interference in Iraqi politics failed to gain a single seat in the 2010 elections, Ayad Jamal Aldin and the Ahrar Party released a press statement and sent letters to the U.N. declaring the presence of massive fraud in the elections and the need for a complete recount, which went ignored in light of the "relative" transparency of the elections.
