= Missing U (film) =

- Theatrical Poster
- Directed by: Brooke Wagstaff
- Written by: Brooke Wagstaff
- Produced by: Brooke Wagstaff
- Starring: Brooke Wagstaff; Adam Ratner
- Animation by: Brooke Wagstaff
- Production company: Ringling College of Art and Design
- Release date: July 31, 2013
- Running time: 2 minutes 29 seconds
- Country: United States

Missing U is a 2013 short animated film made by Brooke Wagstaff which was featured in multiple film festivals.

== Plot ==
A 3D animated adventure that follows the letter I as she travels great distances to find her missing U.

== Production ==
The film was created by Wagstaff over the span of a year and a half while she was a student at the Ringling College of Art and Design. She made it for her senior thesis while pursuing a degree in Computer Animation. It was created using the 3D computer graphics software Autodesk Maya but styled to mimic a variety of traditional techniques such as hand-drawn animation and claymation. The film was made only using resources available through the school.

== Festivals and Honors ==
Event/Organization	Award/Honor	Location	Date
Vimeo	Staff Pick	Online	August, 2013
On Video Creative Festival	Audience Choice Award	Seoul, South Korea	August, 2013
Ritz Premiere International Short Film Festival	Official Selection	Lincoln, England	November, 2013
Indiedemand Film Festival	Best Film of the Year, Staff Pick	Online	November, 2013
SIGGRAPH Asia Computer Animation Festival	Official Selection	Hong Kong	November, 2013
Sonoma International Film Festival	Official Selection	Sonoma, USA	April, 2014
NonStop Barcelona Animació	Official Selection	Barcelona, Spain	May, 2014
Short Shorts Film Festival & Asia	Official Selection	Tokyo, Japan	June, 2014
Scratch! International Animation Film Festival	Official Selection	Lecce, Italy	June, 2014
Camp Bestival	Daily Screening	Dorset, England	July and August, 2014
CINE	Golden Eagle Award	International	July, 2014
Encounters Short Film and Animation Festival	Official Selection	Bristol, England	September, 2014
Be There! Corfu Animation Festival	Official Selection	Corfu, Greece	October, 2014
Bradford Animation Festival	Official Selection	Bradford, England	November, 2014
Puchon International Student Animation Festival	Official Selection	Bucheon, South Korea	November, 2014
Red Rock Film Festival	Official Selection	Zion Canyon, Utah	November, 2014
International Students Creative Award	First Prize: Overseas Division	Osaka, Japan	November, 2014
Los Angeles International Children's Film Festival	Official Selection	Los Angeles, USA	December, 2014
Student Filmmaker Awards	Best Animated Film	Park City, USA	January, 2015
Festival Cinema Giovane	Official Selection	Pieve a Nievole, Italy	March, 2015
Tricky Women International Animation Festival	Official Selection	Vienna, Austria	March, 2015
New Orleans International Children's Film Festival	Official Selection	New Orleans, USA	March, 2015
WonderCon International Children's Film Festival	Official Selection	Anaheim, USA	April, 2015
The Other Art Fair	Official Selection	Bristol, England	May, 2015
San Diego International Children's Film Festival at San Diego Comic-Con	Official Selection	San Diego, USA	July, 2015
Shorts on the Beach	Official Selection	Long Beach, USA	August, 2015
Ars Electronica Animation Festival	Official Selection	Linz, Austria	September, 2015
Long Beach International Film Festival	Official Selection	Long Beach, USA	September, 2015
