= Ayad Khalil Zaki =

Iraqi military officer

Colonel general Ayad Khalil Zaki
- اياد خليل زكي
- Zaki c. 1990

Governor of Muthanna Province
- In office 1995–2002
- President: Saddam Hussein
- Prime Minister: Saddam Hussein

Personal details
- Born: c. 1944 Baghdad, Kingdom of Iraq
- Died: 22 August 2013 (age 69) Amman, Jordan

Military service
- Allegiance: Iraqi Republic (1961–1968); Ba'athist Iraq (1968–1995)
- Branch/service: Iraqi Ground Forces
- Years of service: 1961–1995
- Rank: Colonel General
- Unit: 14th Combat Engineers
- Commands: V Infantry Division
- Battles/wars: See list: First Iraqi-Kurdish War; Yom Kippur War; Second Iraqi-Kurdish War; Iran-Iraq War; Anfal Campaign; Gulf War; Battle of Wadi al-Batin; 1991 Iraqi uprisings

Ayad Khalil Zaki (Arabic: اياد خليل زكي; 1944 – 22 August 2013) was an Iraqi military officer and commander of the Iraqi Army's IV Corps (4th Corps) during the Gulf War. A combat engineering officer in the Iraqi Army, he served as the Iraqi field commander during the Anfal Campaign. By 1990, Zaki was the Commander of the IV Corps of the Iraqi Army and was the commander of the army during the Battle of Wadi al-Batin in the Gulf War.

In 1991, Zaki had been promoted to the position of Armed Forces Assistant Chief of Staff for Supplies and Logistics. In early December 1994, Zaki was one of the Generals called on by Wafiq al-Samarrai to revolt when the latter defected. However, Zaki ignored al-Samarrai's call and refused to defect to the Iraqi opposition and revolt against the government of Saddam Hussein.

Zaki served as Assistant Chief of Staff until being made the Governor of Muthanna Province.

Zaki left Iraq following the 2003 Invasion of Iraq and the overthrow of the Ba'athist government and fled to Jordan, where he spent his final years and died on the 22 August 2013.

Zaki was a Sunni Arab from Baghdad.

== Command and Staff positions held ==
- Second in Command, Sapper Platoon 1956-57
- Pioneers and Sappers Platoon Leader - 1957-1959
- Combat Engineering officers company leader and battalion staff officer course, Soviet Union - 1959-1960
- Second in Command, Sapper Company - 1960-1962
- Commanding Officer, B Sapper Company, 2nd Sapper Battalion, 5th Motorised Brigade - 1962-1964
- Combined Arms/All-Arms Operations Officers Course, Soviet Union - 1964-1965
- Adjutant, 1st Field Engineer Regiment, 1st Division - 1965-1967
- Instructor, Military Engineering College - 1967-1968
- Commanding Officer, 2nd Infantry Battalion, 12th Armoured Brigade, 3rd Armoured Division - 1968-1971
- Higher Command and Staff College Course (Frunze University), Soviet Union - 1971-1972
- GSO-I, 2nd Infantry Brigade, 1st Division - 1972-1976
- Executive Staff Officer, Personnel and Training Division, Army General Headquarters Baghdad - 1976-1979
- Commander, 14th Infantry Brigade, 4th Division - 1979-1982
- Commander, 2nd Combat Engineering Brigade, II Corps - 1982-1984
- General Officer Commanding, 5th Infantry Division, 1984-1987
- GSO-I and Chief of Operations, II Corps - 1987-1990
- General Officer Commanding, IV Corps - 1990-1994
- Assistant Minister of Defence, Deputy Chief of Staff of the Army and Chief of Supplies and Logistics - 1994-1999

== Dates of Ranks ==
Insignia	Rank	Date	Component
	Second lieutenant	c. 1956	Regular Army
	Lieutenant	c. 1957	Regular Army
	Captain	c. 1960	Regular Army
	Major	c. 1965	Regular Army
	Lieutenant Colonel	c. 1968	Regular Army
	Colonel	c. 1972	Regular Army
	Brigadier General	c. 1979	Regular Army
	Major General	c. 1984	Regular Army
	Lieutenant General	c. 1989	Regular Army
	Colonel General	c. 1995	Regular Army
