= Eyad =

Eyad is an Arabian given name that may refer to one of the following people:

- Eyad Hammoud (born 2001), Lebanese footballer
- Eyad Ismoil (born 1971), Jordanian terrorist who took part in the 1993 World Trade Center bombing
- Eyad al-Sarraj (1944-2013), Palestinian psychiatrist
- Eyad Elbayoumi (born 1970), Canadian - Palestinian clinical / consultant pharmacist

== See also ==
- Iyad
