= Gökçebağ, Ayaş =

Gökçebağ
- Neighbourhood
- Location in Turkey Gökçebağ (Turkey Central Anatolia)
- Coordinates: 40.0939°N 32.3319°E
- Country: Turkey
- Province: Ankara
- District: Ayaş
- Population (2022): 124
- Time zone: UTC+3 (TRT)

Gökçebağ is a neighbourhood in the municipality and district of Ayaş, Ankara Province, Turkey. Its population is 124 (2022).
