= Iyad Al-Khatib =

Jordanian footballer

Personal information
- Full name: Iyad Sami Saleh Al-Khatib
- Date of birth: February 21, 1992 (age 34)
- Place of birth: Al-Ramtha, Jordan
- Position: Midfielder

Youth career
- 2006–2012: Al-Ramtha

Senior career*
Years	Team	Apps	(Gls)
2012–2017	Al-Ramtha		

International career
2012–2014	Jordan U-22		
- * Club domestic league appearances and goals

Iyad Sami Saleh Al-Khatib (Arabic: إياد سامي صالح الخطيب) is a retired Jordanian football player who played as a midfielder for Al-Ramtha and Jordan U-22.

== International goals ==
=== None-International Goals ===
#	Date	Venue	Opponent	Score	Result	Competition
1	October 14, 2013	Mafraq	Jordan Manshia Bani Hassan	3-0	Win	Friendly (None-International)
