= Ayaş =

- District and municipality
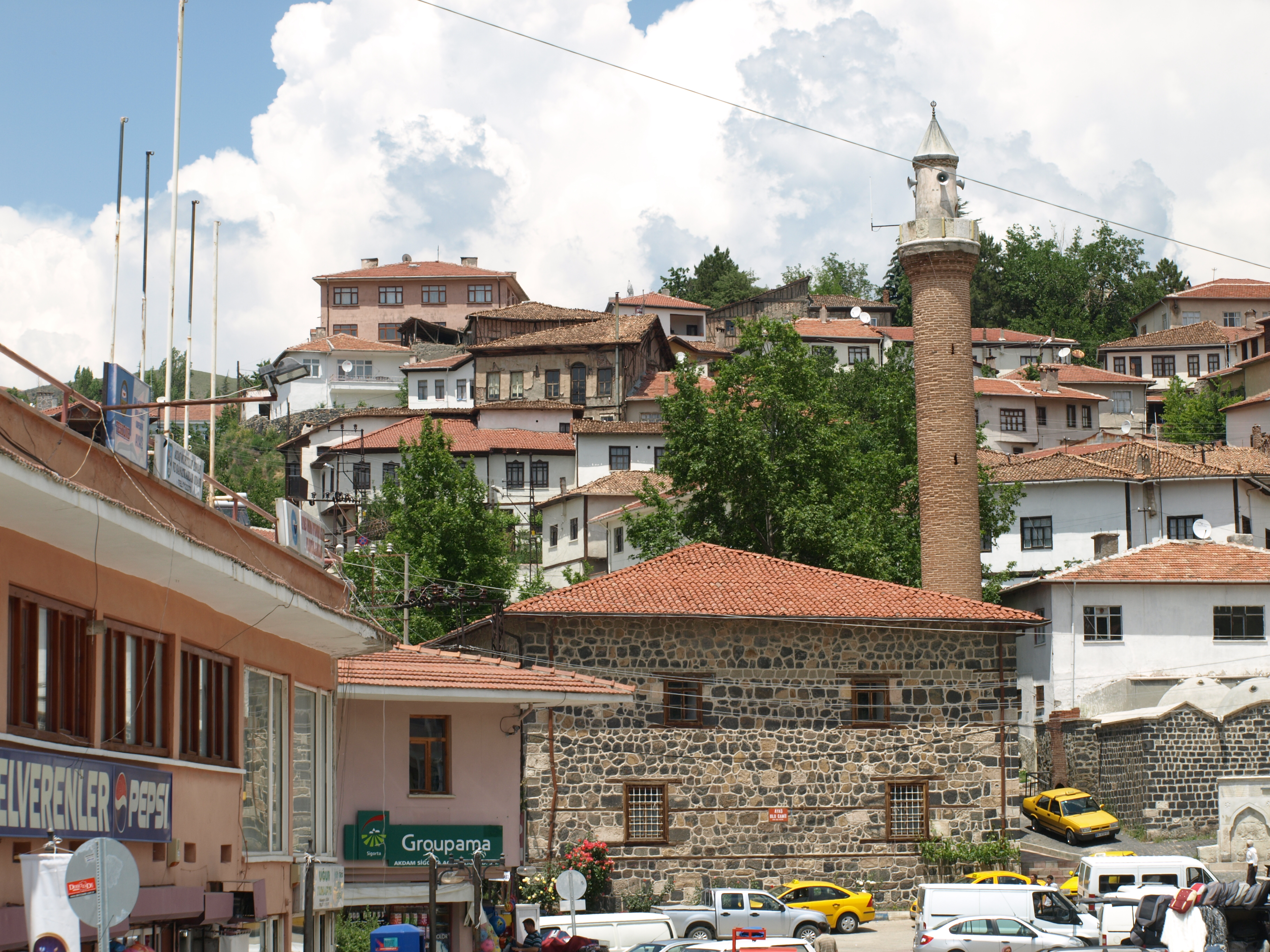
- Ayaş district center

- Map showing Ayaş District in Ankara Province

- Location within Turkey Location within Turkey Central Anatolia
- Country: Turkey
- Province: Ankara

Government
  - Mayor: İzzet Demircioğlu (CHP)
- Area: 1,041 km^{2} (402 sq mi)
- Elevation: 910 m (2,990 ft)
- Population (2022): 12,998
  - Density: 12.49/km^{2} (32.34/sq mi)
- Time zone: UTC+3 (TRT)
- Postal code: 06710
- Area code: 0312
- Website: www.ayas.bel.tr

Ayaş is a municipality and district of Ankara Province, Turkey. Its area is 1,041 km^{2}, and its population is 12,998 (2022). It is 58 km from the city of Ankara, and very rich for historical monuments. Its elevation is 910 m (2,986 ft).

The district is known for its mulberry trees, tomatoes and its mineral water spas, both for drinking and bathing. There is an annual mulberry festival in the town of Ayaş. The town has a long history and is mentioned in folk songs and the journals of the traveller Evliya Çelebi.

The citizens of Ayaş were Oghuz tribes as the village names Bayat, Afşar and Peçenek implies. In 1554, it became a sanjak center, and in 1864 it became a Kaza in Ankara Vilayeti. In Ottoman period, education was advanced in Ayaş. In 1900, there were eight medreses, two primary mekteps and one rüşdiye.

== Composition ==
There are 33 neighbourhoods in Ayaş District:

- Akkaya
- Başayaş
- Başbereket
- Bayat
- Bayram
- Camiatik
- Çanıllı Çiğdemci
- Çanıllı Uluyol
- Dervişimam
- Emine Tevfika Ayaşlı
- Evci
- Ferahfaki
- Feruz
- Gençali
- Gökçebağ
- Gökler
- Hacımemi
- Hacırecep
- Hacıveli
- İlhanköy
- Ilıca
- Oltan
- Ömeroğlu
- Ortabereket
- Pınaryaka
- Şeyhmuhittin
- Sinanlı Cuma
- Sinanlı Hocasinan
- Sinanlı Mahkeme
- Tekke
- Uğurçayırı
- Ulupınar
- Yağmurdede

== Picture gallery ==
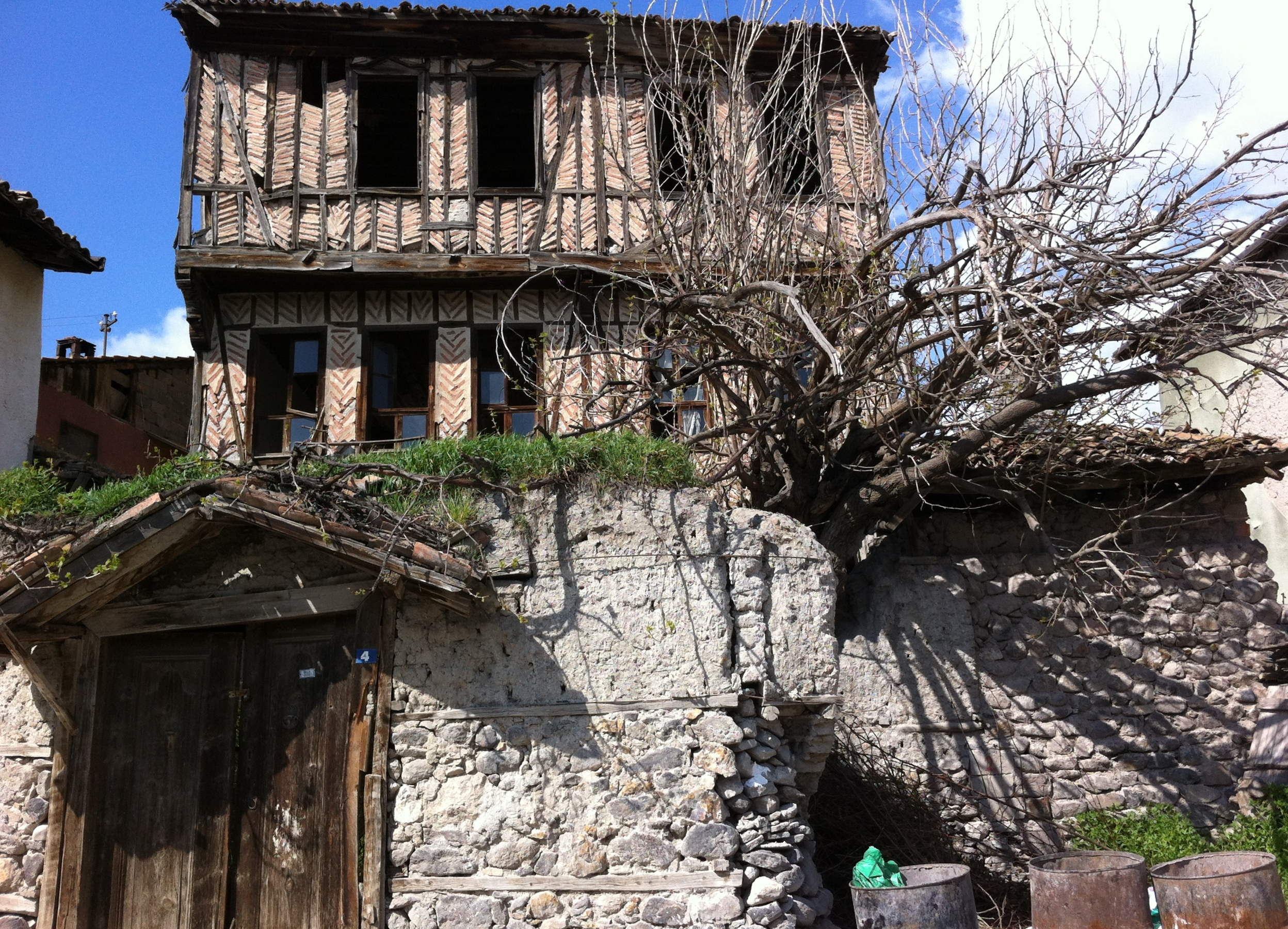
Ayaş houses

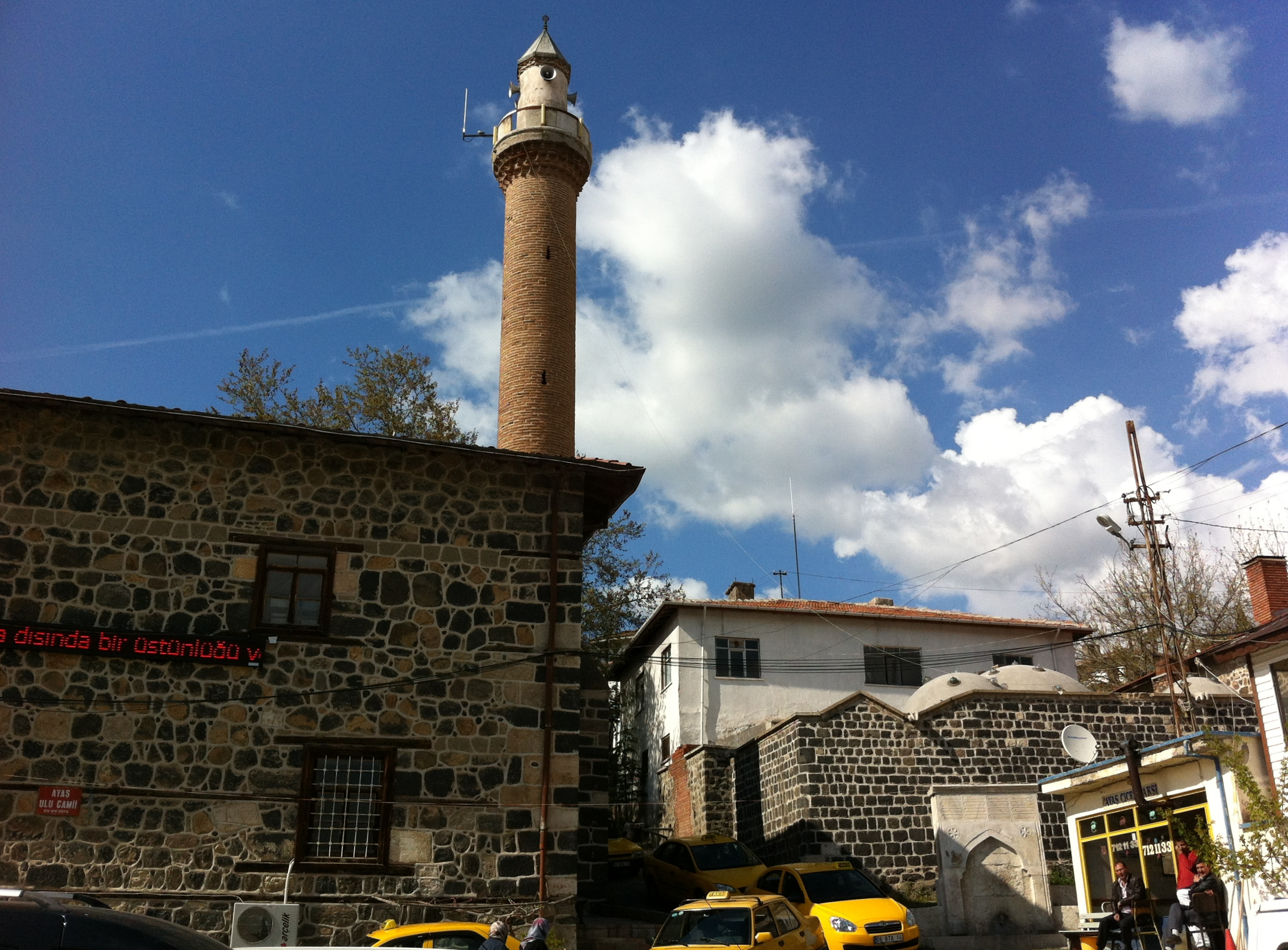
Ulu Cami

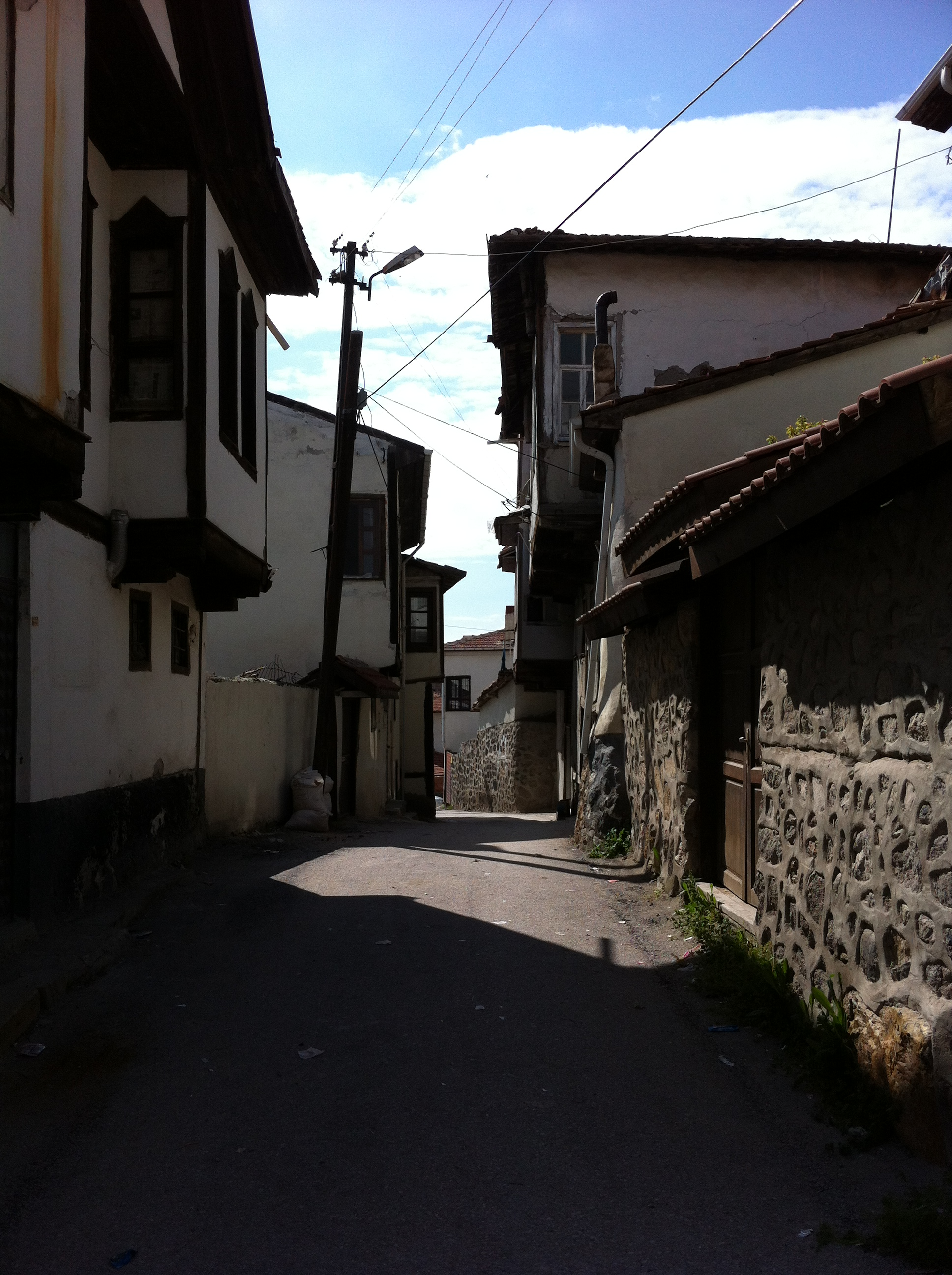

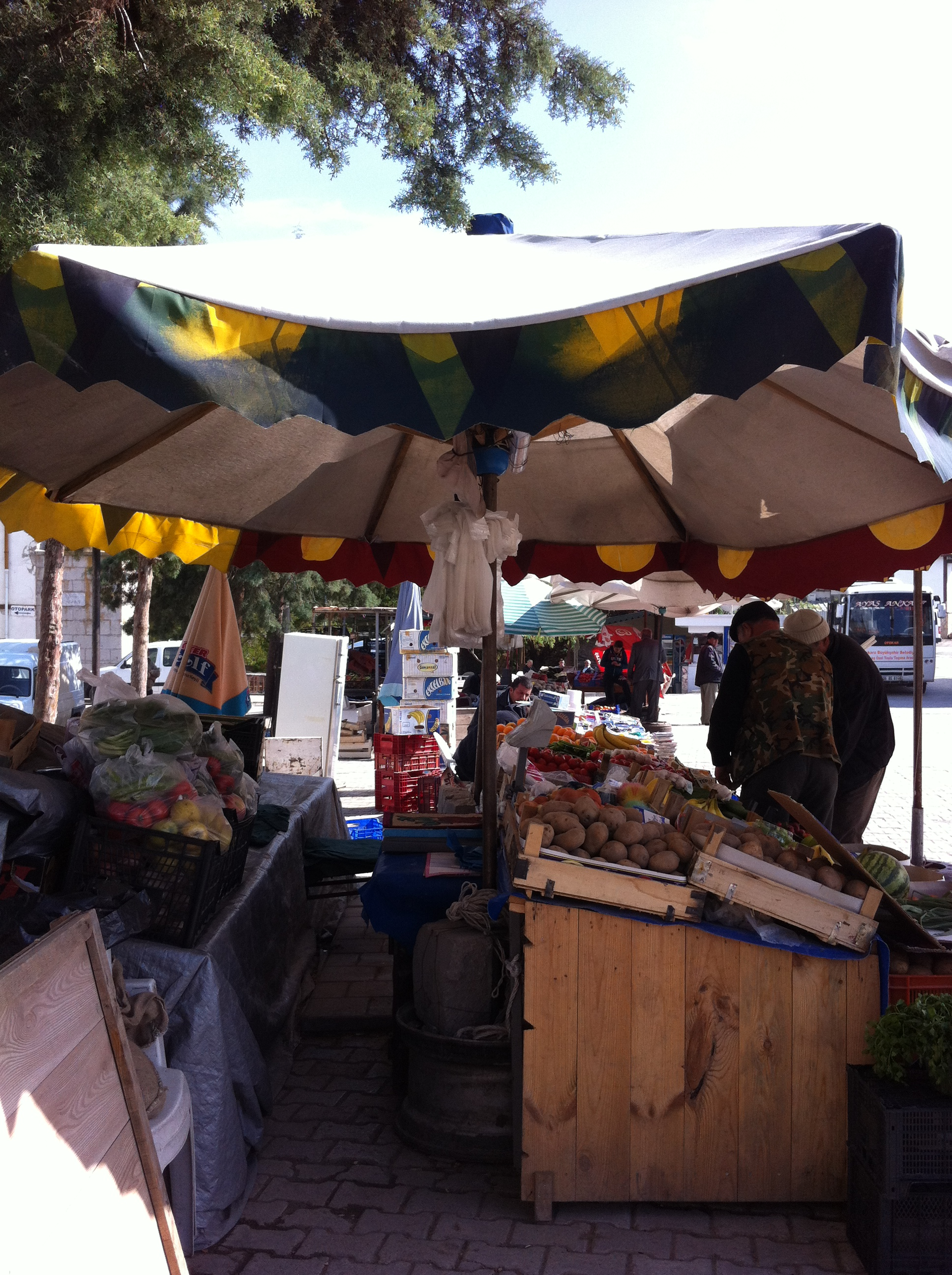

== See also ==
- Ayaş Tunnel, railway tunnel under construction, which will be Turkey's longest when completed.
