= Ayas (film) =

- Film poster
- Directed by: Hüseyin Emre Konyalı; Mustafa Tuğrul Tiryaki
- Written by: Ayşe Şule Bilgiç
- Music by: Kıraç; Nevzat Yılmaz
- Release date: November 22, 2013
- Running time: 82 minutes
- Country: Turkey
- Language: Turkish

Ayas is a 2013 Turkish animated film produced by Düşyeri Animation Studios. The film went on nationwide general release on November 22, 2013.

== Plot ==
The six-year-old Ayas comes from a huge family. Istanbul is his hometown, which he explores together with his sister and all his cousins. He is a curious, smart, cheerful little boy that never seems to get bored.
