= Chhota Bheem and the Curse of Damyaan =

Chhota Bheem and the Curse of Damyaan may refer to these feature films based on Chhota Bheem, an Indian animated television series and its titular character:

- Chhota Bheem and the Curse of Damyaan (2012 film), a 2012 Indian animated film by Rajiv Chilaka
- Chhota Bheem and the Curse of Damyaan (2024 film), a 2024 Indian live action remake by Chilaka

== See also ==
- Chhota Bheem and the Throne of Bali, a 2013 Indian animated feature film by Chilaka
- Chhota Bheem: Kung Fu Dhamaka, a 2019 Indian animated feature film by Chilaka
