= Rajesh Kava =

Indian voice actor (born 1979)

- Born: 18 March 1979 (age 47); Gujarat, India
- Other name: Raju Kava
- Occupation: Voice actor
- Spouse: Dimple Kava (m. 2008)

Rajesh Kava (born 18 March 1979) is an Indian voice actor, fluent in Hindi, Gujarati and English.

He is best known for being the third Hindi dub-over voice artist for Daniel Radcliffe's role as Harry Potter, in the last three Harry Potter films, after it was passed on from Ami Trivedi's brother, Karan Trivedi. He has also voiced for Orlando Bloom as Legolas in The Lord of the Rings film trilogy.

Kava runs an academy, "Violet Wings Voice Academy", which offer workshops and a course on voice acting and dubbing.

== Career ==
Kava began voice acting in 2000. He first gained recognition for his work after dubbing Jaggu Bandar in the animated series Chhota Bheem in 2008. In the following year, he began voicing for the titular character Harry Potter in the last three films of the franchise. He also voiced Legolas, an elf in the Lord of the Rings franchise and the main character, Jon Snow in the fantasy drama series Game of Thrones.

Kava voiced for anime shows which ran on Cartoon Network India such as Dragon Ball Z, Beyblade: Metal Fusion, and Inazuma Eleven.

In September 2021, Kava provided the voice of Seong Gi-Hun in the Korean television series Squid Game. He then voiced Beerus in Dragon Ball Super. From 2023, he began voicing Denki Kaminari and several other characters in the Hindi dub version of My Hero Academia for Cartoon Network.

Aside from voice acting for international projects and animated series, Kava has also lent his voice to many Tamil actors such as Vijay and Dhanush in the Hindi dub version of their films.

== Filmography ==
=== Animated series ===
Program title	Character	Language	Number of episodes
Arjun - Prince of Bali	Khojo and Sehdev Varma	Hindi	Unknown
Chhota Bheem	Jaggu Bandar	Hindi	277+
The Adventures of King Vikram	King Vikram	Hindi	Unknown
Taarak Mehta Kka Chhota Chashmah	Jethalal Champaklal Gada	Hindi	50+
Guru aur Bhole	M.J	Hindi	
Pinaki and Happy	Happy	Hindi	45+

=== Animated films ===
Year	Film title	Role	Language	Notes
2013	Chhota Bheem and the Throne of Bali	Jaggu Bandar	Hindi	
2012	Chhota Bheem and the Curse of Damyaan	Jaggu Bandar	Hindi	
2016	Chhota Bheem: Himalayan Adventure	Jaggu Bandar	Hindi	
2010	Chhota Bheem: Bheem vs Aliens	Jaggu Bandar	Hindi	
2011	Chhota Bheem: Journey To Petra	Jaggu Bandar	Hindi	
2011	Chhota Bheem: Master of Shaolin	Jaggu Bandar	Hindi	
2012	Chhota Bheem: Dholakpur to Kathmandu	Jaggu Bandar	Hindi	
2012	Chhota Bheem Aur Hanuman	Jaggu Bandar	Hindi	
2012	Chhota Bheem : The Rise Of Kirmada	Jaggu Bandar	Hindi	
2012	Chhota Bheem Aur Ganesh in The Amazing Odyssey	Jaggu Bandar	Hindi	
	Chhota Bheem Junglee Kabila/Broken Amulet	Jaggu Bandar	Hindi	
2013	Chhota Bheem And The Crown of Valahalla	Jaggu Bandar	Hindi	
2013	Chhota Bheem and the Incan Adventure	Jaggu Bandar	Hindi	
2013	Chhota Bheem aur Krishna vs Zimbara	Jaggu Bandar	Hindi	
2013	Chhota Bheem And The Shinobi Secret	Jaggu Bandar	Hindi	
	Chhota Bheem Neeli Pahaadi	Jaggu Bandar	Hindi	
	Super Bheem: Aakhri Chunauti	Jaggu Bandar	Hindi	
	Super Bheem: Hawamein Halla	Jaggu Bandar	Hindi	
	Chhota Bheem Dus Pe Dus	Jaggu Bandar	Hindi	
	Chhota Bheem Mayavi Gorgan	Jaggu Bandar	Hindi	
	Chhota Bheem Ki Baazi	Jaggu Bandar	Hindi	
	Chhota Bheem aur Paanch Ajoobe	Jaggu Bandar	Hindi	
	Chhota Bheem Mission Mangalyaan	Jaggu Bandar	Hindi	

== Dubbing roles ==
=== Live action series ===
Program title	Actor	Character	Dub language	Original language	Episodes	Original airdate	Dubbed airdate	Notes
CID	Unknown actor	Shekhar	Hindi		1545	21 January 1998 - 28 October 2018		Episodic role in episode 647 - Hire Ka Raaz
Sankatmochan Mahabali Hanuman	Nirbhay Wadhwa	Lord Hanuman	Hindi			4 May 2015 – Present		
Stan Lee's Superhumans	Daniel Browning Smith	Himself	Hindi	English	15	8/5/2010-Current		
The Works	Daniel H. Wilson	Himself	Hindi	English	10	7/10/2008-9/25/2008		
Game of Thrones	Kit Harington	Jon Snow	Hindi	English		2011 – 2019		
Power Rangers Jungle Fury	Bede Skinner	Jarrod/Dai-Shi	Hindi	English	32	February 18 – November 3, 2008		Aired on Jetix then Disney XD then Sonic.
13 Reasons Why	Dylan Minnette	Clay Jensen	Hindi	English	49	March 31, 2017 – June 5, 2020		Netflix Original show

=== Animated series ===
Program title	Original voice	Character	Dub language	Original language	Number of episodes	Original airdate	Dubbed airdate	Notes
Men in Black: The Series	Keith Diamond	Agent J	Hindi	English	53	11 October 1997 – 30 June 2001		
Ben 10: Alien Force	Alexander Polinsky	Argit	Hindi	English	46	4/18/2008- 3/26/2010	11/12/2009- Early 2010	
Ben 10: Ultimate Alien	Alexander Polinsky	Argit	Hindi	English	52	4/23/2010- 3/31/2012	10/10/2010 - Mid 2012	
Sabrina: Secrets of a Teenage Witch	Ian James Corlett and Matthew Erickson	Salem Saberhagen, Harvey Kinkle, Professor Geist	Hindi	English				
Horrid Henry	Wayne Forester, Aidan Cook, Lizzie Waterworth	Dad, Rude Ralph	Hindi	English				The Hindi dub of this show is titled Bas Karo Henry (translated in English as Stop it Henry).
The Flintstones	Mel Blanc	Barney Rubble	Hindi	English				
The Grim Adventures of Billy and Mandy	Richard Steven Horvitz	Billy	Hindi	English	71	6/13/2003- 10/12/2008		Known as: Billy Mandy Aur Life Mein Haddi.
Iron Man: Armored Adventures	Adrian Petriw	Tony Stark / Iron Man	Hindi	English	52	4/24/2009- 25 July 2012		
Redakai: Conquer the Kairu	Cory Doran	Mookee	Hindi	English	16	7/9/2011- Unknown	5/1/2014- Current	
Ultimate Spider-Man	Freddy Rodriguez	Miguel O'Hara / Spider-Man 2099	Hindi	English				
Spider-Man	Hank Azaria	Eddie Brock / Venom	Hindi	English				
Teenage Mutant Ninja Turtles	Roger Craig Smith	Timothy / Pulverizer / Mutagen Man	Hindi	English	82	9/29/2012-Ongoing	May 2013-Ongoing	
We Bare Bears	Eric Edelstein	Grizzly bear	Hindi	English		27/7/2015-Ongoing	29/11/2015- Ongoing	Aired by Cartoon Network India
Beyblade	Aya Hisakawa (JP); Daniel DeSanto (EN)	Ray Kon (Rei Kon)	Hindi	Japanese	51	1/8/2001- 12/24/2001		
Beyblade V-Force	Aya Hisakawa (JP); Daniel DeSanto (EN)	Ray Kon (Rei Kon)	Hindi	Japanese	51	7/1/2002-30/12/2002		
Beyblade G-Revolution	Aya Hisakawa (JP); Daniel DeSanto (EN)	Ray Kon (Rei Kon)	Hindi	Japanese	52	6/1/2003- 29/12/2003		
Beyblade: Metal Fusion	Satoshi Hino	Kyoya Tategami	Hindi	Japanese	51	4/4/2009- 3/28/2010	11/10/2010 - July 2011	Aired by Cartoon Network India and dubbed by Sound & Vision India .
Beyblade: Metal Masters	Satoshi Hino Shō Hayami Hiroki Takahashi Yoshimasa Hosoya Daisuke Shusaku	Kyoya Tategami Ryūsei Hagane / Phoenix Chao-Xin Wales Ian Garcia	Hindi	Japanese	51	4/4/2010- 3/27/2011	22/10/2011- 7/7/2012	Aired by Cartoon Network India and dubbed by Sound & Vision India .
Beyblade: Metal Fury	Satoshi Hino Sho Hayami Hiroki Takahashi Yoshimasa Hosoya Kenjiro Tsuda	Kyoya Tategami Ryūsei Hagane / Phoenix Chao- Xin Wales Ryuga	Hindi	Japanese	39	4/10/2011- 4/1/2012	27/10/2013- 16/3/2014	
Beyblade Burst Turbo	Shinnosuke Tachibana	Genji Suoh	Hindi	Japanese	51	4/2/2018- 3/25/2019	Late 2020- Early 2021	Broadcast by Marvel HQ .
Dragon Ball Z	Shigeru Nakahara (JP); Chuck Huber (EN)	Android 17	Hindi	Japanese	291	4/26/1989-1/31/1996	2001-2008	
Inazuma Eleven	Hirofumi Nojima Shūhei Sakaguchi	Axel Blaze Hurley Cane	Hindi	Japanese		10/5/2008- 4/27/2011		
Ninja Hattori-kun	Eiko Yamada	Kagechiyo (Keo)	Hindi	Japanese		9/28/1981- 12/25/1987		Known as Ninja Hattori in India.
Ganbare Kickers	Kenta Ishii	Kenta Ishii.	Hindi	Japanese		9/28/1981- 12/25/1987		
Love, Death & Robots	Josh Brener	K-VRC	Hindi	English	18 (dubbed 1)	15 March 2019 – present		Episode: "Three Robots"
Dragon Ball Super	Koichi Yamadera Shigeru Nakahara	Beerus Android 17	Hindi	Japanese	131	July 5, 2015 – March 25, 2018	May 22, 2022 - November 6, 2022	Aired on Cartoon Network India
Dragon Ball Z Kai	Shigeru Nakahara	Android 17	Hindi	Japanese	167	April 5, 2009 – March 25, 2018	April 16, 2023 - November 12, 2023	Aired on Cartoon Network India

=== Live action films ===
==== Hollywood films ====
Film title	Actor	Character	Dub language	Original language	Original year release	Dub year release	Notes
Deadpool	Karan Soni	Dopinder	Hindi	English	2016	2016	Bhuvan Bam dubbed this role in Deadpool 2.
Kung Fu Yoga	Jackie Chan	Jack	Hindi	Mandarin; English	2017	2017	
The Lord of the Rings: The Fellowship of the Ring	Orlando Bloom	Legolas	Hindi	English	2001	2002	
The Lord of the Rings: The Two Towers	Orlando Bloom	Legolas	Hindi	English	2002	2003	
The Lord of the Rings: The Return of the King	Orlando Bloom	Legolas	Hindi	English	2003	2004	
Harry Potter and the Half Blood Prince	Daniel Radcliffe	Harry Potter	Hindi	English	2009	2009	
Harry Potter and the Deathly Hallows – Part 1	Daniel Radcliffe	Harry Potter	Hindi	English	2010	2010	
Harry Potter and the Deathly Hallows – Part 2	Daniel Radcliffe	Harry Potter	Hindi	English	2011	2011	
Night at the Museum: Battle of the Smithsonian	a muppet character Original voice by Caroll Spinney	Oscar the Grouch	Hindi	English	2009	2009	
The Bounty Hunter	Adam Rose	Jimmy	Hindi	English	2010	2010	
The Reluctant Fundamentalist	Riz Ahmed	Changez Khan	Hindi	English	2012	2012	
The Legend of Hercules	Liam McIntyre	Sotiris	Hindi	English	2014	2014	
Ant-Man	David Dastmalchian	Kurt	Hindi	English	2015	2015	
Ant-Man and the Wasp	David Dastmalchian	Kurt	Hindi	English	2018	2018	
Goosebumps	Dylan Minnette	Zach Cooper	Hindi	English	2015	2015	
Batman v Superman: Dawn of Justice	Jesse Eisenberg	Lex Luthor	Hindi	English	2016	2016	
Justice League	Jesse Eisenberg	Lex Luthor (cameo)	Hindi	English	2017	2017	
Teenage Mutant Ninja Turtles: Out of the Shadows	Stephen Amell	Casey Jones	Hindi	English	2016	2016	
Sky High	Steven Strait	Warren Peace	Hindi	English	2005	2005	
Max Steel	Ben Winchell	Maxwell "Max" McGrath / Max Steel	Hindi	English	2016	2018	
Scooby-Doo 2: Monsters Unleashed	Seth Green	Patrick Wisley	Hindi	English	2004	2004	
Bumblebee	Dylan O'Brien	Bumblebee (voice)	Hindi	English	2018	2018	
Mortal Engines	Robert Sheehan	Tom Natsworthy	Hindi	English	2018	2018	
Split	James McAvoy	Kevin Wendell Crumb / The Horde	Hindi	English	2016	2019	
Aladdin	Alan Tudyk	Iago	Hindi	English	2019	2019	
X-Men: Apocalypse	Kodi Smit-McPhee	Kurt Wagner / Nightcrawler	Hindi	English	2016	2016	
Dark Phoenix	Kodi Smit-McPhee	Kurt Wagner / Nightcrawler	Hindi	English	2019	2019	
Leap Year	Matthew Goode	Declan O'Callaghan	Hindi	English	2010	2010	
Enola Holmes	Sam Claflin	Mycroft Holmes	Hindi	English	2020	2020	

==== Indian films ====
Film title	Actor	Character	Dub language	Original language	Original year release	Dub year release	Notes
Saaho	Vennela Kishore	Goswami	Hindi	Hindi	2019		
Jab We Met	Shahid Kapoor	Aditya Kashyap/Aditya Kumar	Gujarati	Hindi	2007	2022	The Gujarati dub was titled: "Jyare Ame Malya".
Sullan	Dhanush	Subramani (Sullan)	Hindi	Tamil	2004	2008	The Hindi dub was titled: "Tezaab: The Terror".
Enthiran	N. Santhanam	Siva	Hindi	Tamil	2010	2010	The Hindi dub was titled: "Robot".
Jayam	Nithiin	Venkat (Vijay in Hindi version)	Hindi	Telugu	2002	2010	The Hindi dub was titled: "Phir Hogi Pyar Ki Jeet".
King	Arjan Bajwa	Ajay	Hindi	Telugu	2008	2010	The Hindi dub was titled: "King No. 1".
Rama Rama Krishna Krishna	Ram Pothineni	Rama Krishna	Hindi	Telugu	2010	2011	The Hindi dub was titled: "Nafrat Ki Jung".
Venghai	Dhanush	Selvam (Shravan in Hindi version)	Hindi	Tamil	2011	2012	The Hindi dub was titled: "Meri Taaqat Mera Faisla".
Velayudham	Vijay	Velayudham (Velu)	Hindi	Tamil	2011	2013	The Hindi dub was titled: "Super Hero Shahenshah".
Kuruvi	Vijay	Vetrivel	Hindi	Tamil	2008	2013	The Hindi dub was titled: "Jo Jeeta Wohi Baazigar".
Singam II	N. Santhanam	Susai (Makki in Hindi version)	Hindi	Tamil	2013	2013	The Hindi dub was titled: "Main Hoon Surya Singham II".
Aata	Siddharth Narayan	Srikrishna	Hindi	Telugu	2007	2014	The Hindi dub was titled: "Aaj Ka Great Gambler".
Lingaa	N. Santhanam	Lingaa's sidekick	Hindi	Tamil	2014	2014	
I	N. Santhanam	Babu	Hindi	Tamil	2015	2015	
Shivam	Ram Pothineni	Shiva Ram	Hindi	Telugu	2015	2015	
Pattathu Yaanai	N. Santhanam	Gouravam	Hindi	Tamil	2013	2016	The Hindi dub was titled: "Daringbaaz Khiladi".
Puli	Ali	Basha	Hindi	Telugu	2010	2016	The Hindi dub was titled: "Jaanbaaz Khiladi".
Saguni	N. Santhanam	Rajini Appadurai a.k.a. Rajini / Pappu Kumaran (Pappu Kumar in Hindi version)	Hindi	Tamil	2012	2016	The Hindi dub was titled: "Rowdy Leader".
Aambala	N. Santhanam	RDX Rajasekhar	Hindi	Tamil	2015	2016	
Maari	Kalloori Vinoth	Robert (Adithangi)	Hindi	Tamil	2015	2016	The Hindi dub was titled: "Rowdy Hero".
Courier Boy Kalyan	Nithiin	Kalyan	Hindi	Telugu	2015	2016	
Brahmotsavam	Mahesh Babu	Babu	Hindi	Telugu	2016	2016	The Hindi dub was titled: "The Real Tiger 2".
Dohchay	Naga Chaitanya	Chandu	Hindi	Telugu	2015	2016	The Hindi dub was titled: "Vidroh - Let's Fight Back".
Sura	Vadivelu	Umbrella	Hindi	Tamil	2010	2017	
Jaggu Dada	Vishal Hegde	Venki	Hindi	Kannada	2016	2017	The Hindi dub was titled: "Khatarnak Khiladi 3".
Vaamanan	N. Santhanam	Chandru	Hindi	Tamil	2009	2017	The Hindi dub was titled: "Dangerous Lover".
Sillunu Oru Kaadhal	N. Santhanam	Rajesh	Hindi	Tamil	2006	2017	The Hindi dub was titled: "Mohabbat Ke Dushman".
Thani Oruvan	Sricharan	Kathiresan IPS	Hindi	Tamil	2015	2017	The Hindi dub was titled: "Double Attack 2".
Shivalinga	Vadivelu	Pattukunjan	Hindi	Tamil	2017	2017	The Hindi dub was titled: "Kanchana Returns".
Speedunnodu	Srinivasa Reddy	Suri	Hindi	Telugu	2016	2017	
Pandavulu Pandavulu Tummeda	Varun Sandesh	Varun / Upagraha Raj	Hindi	Telugu	2014	2017	The Hindi dub was titled: "Sabse Badi Hera Pheri 3".
Mappillai	Vivek †	Child Chinna / James Pandiyan / Youth	Hindi	Tamil	2011	2017	The Hindi dub was titled: "Jamai Raja".
Bairavaa	Sriman	PK's assistant	Hindi	Tamil	2017	2017	The Hindi dub was titled: "Bhairava".
Duvvada Jagannadham	Shashank	DJ's assistant	Hindi	Telugu	2017	2017	The Hindi dub was titled: "DJ".
Saagasam	John Vijay	'Chain' Jaipal	Hindi	Tamil	2016	2017	The Hindi dub was titled: "Jeene Nahi Doonga 2".
Winner	Sai Dharam Tej	Siddharth "Siddu" Reddy	Hindi	Telugu	2017	2017	The Hindi dub was titled: "Shoorveer".
Yaare Koogadali	Sadhu Kokila	Shishupala	Hindi	Kannada	2012	2018	The Hindi dub was titled: "Nayak: The Hero 2".
Tholi Prema	Pawan Kalyan	Balu	Hindi	Telugu	1998	2018	The Hindi dub was titled: "Mere Sajna".
Luckunnodu	Prabhas Sreenu	Thief	Hindi	Telugu	2017	2018	The Hindi dub was titled: "Sabse Bada Zero".
All in All Azhagu Raja	N. Santhanam	Kalyanam (Kareena Chopra) / Kali	Hindi	Tamil	2013	2018	The Hindi dub was titled: "Hero No. Zero 2".
Eedo Rakam Aado Rakam	Ravi Babu	Aadi Narayana	Hindi	Telugu	2016	2018	The Hindi dub was titled: "Hyper"
Hebbuli	Chikkanna	Sundara (Harish in Hindi version)	Hindi	Kannada	2017	2018	
Kaala	Manikandan	Lenin	Hindi	Tamil	2018	2018	The Hindi dub was titled: "Kaala Karikaalan".
Vivegam	Karunakaran	Arumai Prakasam (Appu in Hindi version), "APS"	Hindi	Tamil	2017	2018	
Thupparivaalan	Vishal	Detective Kaniyan Poongundran (Kanhaiya Pradyuman in Hindi version)	Hindi	Tamil	2017	2018	The Hindi dub was titled: "Dashing Detective".
Sketch	Soori	Maari	Hindi	Tamil	2018	2018	
Thikka	Satya	Stephen	Hindi	Telugu	2016	2018	The Hindi dub was titled: "Rocket Raja".
Maan Karate	Soori	Tiger Tyson	Hindi	Tamil	2014	2018	The Hindi dub was titled: "Hero No. Zero 3".
Awe	Nani	Nani	Hindi	Telugu	2018	2018	The Hindi dub was titled: "Antar Yudh".
Manam	Naga Chaitanya	Radha Mohan / Nagarjuna	Hindi	Telugu	2014	2018	The Hindi dub was titled: "Dayaalu".
Bharat Ane Nenu	Mahesh Babu	Bharat Ram	Hindi	Telugu	2018	2018	The Hindi dub was titled: "Dashing CM Bharat".
Aatadukundam Raa	Sushanth	Karthik	Hindi	Telugu	2016	2019	The Hindi dub was titled: "Mera Intekam".
Maanagaram	Sri	Job Applicant	Hindi	Tamil	2017	2019	The Hindi dub was titled: "Dadagiri 2".
Thanga Magan	Dhanush	Thamizh Vijayraghavan	Hindi	Tamil	2015	2019	The Hindi dub was titled: "Paap Ki Kamai".
Om Shanti	Nikhil Siddharth	Teja	Hindi	Telugu	2010	2019	
Amar Akbar Anthony	Srinivasa Reddy	Kandulu	Hindi	Telugu	2018	2019	The Hindi dub was titled: "Amar Akbhar Anthoni".
Velainu Vandhutta Vellaikaaran	Soori	Sakkarai (Pushpa Purushan)	Hindi	Tamil	2016	2019	The Hindi dub was titled: "Disco Raja".
Sainikudu	Mahesh Babu	Siddharth	Hindi	Telugu	2006	2019	The Hindi dub was titled: "Ab Hamse Na Takkrana".
Kanthaswamy	Vadivelu	Thengakadai Thenappan	Hindi	Tamil	2009	2019	The Hindi dub was titled: "Temper 2".
Bhaskar Oru Rascal	Soori	Rakkappa a.k.a. Rocky	Hindi	Tamil	2018	2019	The Hindi dub was titled: "Mawali Raaj".
Maari 2	Kalloori Vinoth	Robert (Adithangi)	Hindi	Tamil	2018	2019	The Hindi dub was titled: "Maari".
Bhale Bhale Magadivoy	Srinivasa Reddy	Nandana (Nandini in Hindi version)'s relative	Hindi	Telugu	2015	2020	The Hindi dub was titled: "My Name Is Lucky".
Idhaya Thirudan	N. Santhanam	Mahesh	Hindi	Tamil	2006	2020	The Hindi dub was titled: "Mard Ki Zaban 3".
Sathya	Sathish	Babu Khan	Hindi	Tamil	2017	2020	
Ye Mantram Vesave	Ashish Raj Bidkikar	Satya	Hindi	Telugu	2018	2020	The Hindi dub was titled: "Pyar Ka Khel".
Saakshyam	Bellamkonda Sreenivas	Viswa	Hindi	Telugu	2018	2020	The Hindi dub was titled: "Pralay The Destroyer".
Sixer	Sathish	Sathish	Hindi	Tamil	2019	2020	
Gorilla	Jiiva	Jeeva	Hindi	Tamil	2019	2020	The Hindi dub was titled: "Gorilla Gang".
Marudhamalai	Vadivelu	Encounter Ekambaram	Hindi	Tamil	2007	2020	The Hindi dub was titled: "Policewala Gunda 4".
Siruthai	N. Santhanam	Kaatu Poochi	Hindi	Tamil	2011	2020	
Saravana	Five Star Krishna	Krishna	Hindi	Tamil	2006	2020	The Hindi dub was titled: "Dangerous Khiladi 7".
Vada Chennai	Hari Krishnan	Raju	Hindi	Tamil	2018	2020	The Hindi dub was titled: "Chennai Central".
Pogaru	Chikkanna	Shiva's friend	Hindi	Kannada	2021	2021	
Roberrt	Chikkanna	Agni	Hindi	Kannada	2021	2021	
ABCD: American Born Confused Desi	Master Bharath	Bhasha	Hindi	Telugu	2019	2021	
Dagaalty	N. Santhanam	Guru	Hindi	Tamil	2020	2021	The Hindi dub was titled: "Dackalti".
Ala Vaikunthapurramuloo	Sushanth	Raj Manohar	Hindi	Telugu	2020	2022	
Dude (2025 film)	Pradeep Ranganathan	Agan Chidambaram (Gagan in Hindi Version)	Hindi	Tamil	2025	2025	

=== Animated films ===
Film	Original voice	Character	Dub language	Original language	Original year release	Dub year release	Notes
Bee Movie	Jerry Seinfeld	Barry B. Benson	Hindi	English	2007	2007	
Coco	Gael Garcia Bernal	Hector	Hindi	English	2017	2017	
Spider-Man: Across the Spiderverse	Jason Schwartzman	Spot	Hindi	English	2023	2023	
Dragon Ball Z: The History of Trunks	Shigeru Nakahara	Android 17	Hindi	Japanese	1993	2024	
Dragon Ball Z: Broly – The Legendary Super Saiyan	Bin Shimada	Broly	Hindi	Japanese	1993		
Dragon Ball Z: Broly – Second Coming	Bin Shimada	Broly	Hindi	Japanese	1994		
Dragon Ball Z: Bio-Broly	Bin Shimada	Bio-Broly	Hindi	Japanese	1994		
Dragon Ball Z: Battle of Gods	Koichi Yamadera	Beerus	Hindi	Japanese	2013	2022	
Dragon Ball Z: Resurrection 'F'	Koichi Yamadera	Beerus	Hindi	Japanese	2015	2022	
Dragon Ball Super: Super Hero	Koichi Yamadera Bin Shimada	Beerus Broly	Hindi	Japanese	2022	2023	

== Films and other shows he dubbed voices in ==
- Diary of a Wimpy Kid, Diary of a Wimpy Kid: Rodrick Rules, Diary of a Wimpy Kid: Dog Days, Diary of a Wimpy Kid: The Long Haul, he voiced Greg Heffley in these films, the original actors of him are Zachary Gordon and Jason Drucker (he only voiced him in Diary of a Wimpy Kid: The Long Haul).
- Ben 10: Omniverse, he voiced Ben 23 (in only episode 19) and Argit in this show, the original actors of them are Tara Strong and Alexander Polinsky.

== See also ==
- List of Indian dubbing artists
