= Hanuman vs Mahiravana =

- Directed by: Ezhil Vendan
- Written by: Narayanan Vaidyanathan
- Based on: Ramayana by Valmiki
- Produced by: Rajiv Chilaka; Samir Jain; Srinivas Chilakalapudi
- Production company: Green Gold Animation Gamaya Inc
- Distributed by: Yash Raj Films
- Release date: 6 July 2018 (India)
- Running time: 96 minutes
- Country: India
- Language: Hindi

Hanuman vs Mahiravana is a 2018 Indian Hindi-language epic adventure 2D and 3D stereoscopic animated film, made by Gamaya Inc, produced by Green Gold Animation Pvt Ltd and distributed by Yash Raj Films. Written by Narayanan Vaidyanathan and directed by Dr. Ezhil Vendan. It is the story of Hanuman and his attempts to free Rama and Lakshmana from the clutches of evil wizard Mahiravana. It focuses on the tale of Hanuman and his biggest battle with Ravana’s youngest step-brother, the king of Patala Mahiravana.

The movie Hanuman vs Mahiravana was released across India on July 6, 2018. The film was distributed by Yash Raj Films and released in four languages including dubs in English, Tamil and Telugu.

== Plot ==
It focuses on the tale of Hanuman and his biggest battle with Ravana’s youngest step-brother, the king of Pataala Mahiravana.

== Characters ==
- Rama (7th incarnation of Bhagavan Maha Vishnu)
- Sita (incarnation of Goddess Maha Lakshmi)
- Lakshmana (incarnation of Anantha/ Sesha Naga (Serpent bed of Maha Vishnu))
- Hanuman (Son of demigod Wind and Avatar of Lord Shiva)
- Sugriva the Vanara king of Kishkindha
- Vibhishana younger brother of Ravana and Kumbhakarna
- Ravana mighty king of Lanka Rakshasa ruler
- Mahiravana - king of Patala loka
- Sage Tamisra
- Baka
- Taka
- Assassin Commander
- Monkey Soldier Makardhwaja

== Reception ==
The film received mixed reviews. Cinestaan said that it "fails to make an impact either as an animated adventure, or a retelling of the ancient legend of Mahiravana." The Times of India gave it 2.5/5 stars saying "is worth a watch but don’t go expecting anything that's world class".

== See also ==
- Indian animation industry
- List of Indian animated feature films
