= Chhota Bheem and the Curse of Damyaan (2024 film) =

2024 film directed by Rajiv Chilaka

- Theatrical release poster
- Directed by: Rajiv Chilaka
- Written by: Niraj Vikram; Sridisha Dilip
- Based on: Chhota Bheem by Rajiv Chilaka; Chhota Bheem and the Curse of Damyaan by; Richa Ingle Deo and Seeta
- Produced by: Rajiv Chilaka; Megha Chilaka; Srinivas Chilakapudi; Bharath Laxmipati
- Starring: Yagya Bhasin; Aashriya Mishra; Swarna Pandey; Advik Jaiswal; Divyam Dawar; Daivik Dawar; Kabir Sajid; Anupam Kher; Makarand Deshpande
- Cinematography: Suryaa
- Edited by: Junaid Siddiqui
- Music by: Raghav Sachar
- Production company: Green Gold Studios
- Distributed by: UFO Moviez; Cinépolis
- Release date: 31 May 2024
- Running time: 145 minutes
- Country: India
- Language: Hindi

Chhota Bheem and the Curse of Damyaan is a 2024 Indian Hindi-language children's fantasy action adventure film co-produced and directed by Rajiv Chilaka, written by Niraj Vikram and Sridisha Dilip and produced by Green Gold Studios. It is a live-action adaptation of the 2012 animated film of the same name and based on the characters from the animated series Chhota Bheem. The film stars Yagya Bhasin, Aashriya Mishra, Swarna Pandey, Advik Jaiswal, Divyam Dawar, Daivik Dawar, Kabir Sajid, Anupam Kher and Makarand Deshpande.The soundtrack and background score were composed by Raghav Sachar, while the cinematography and editing were handled by Suryaa and Junaid Siddiqui.

Chhota Bheem and the Curse of Damyaan was released in theatres on 31 May 2024.

== Synopsis ==
In the mystical land of Dholakpur, Bheem and his loyal gang find themselves facing an ancient evil. The villainous demon Damyaan, who was granted immortality centuries ago, threatens to wreak havoc upon the world. His dark powers and malevolence pose a grave danger to humanity.

Driven by a sense of duty and courage, Bheem embarks on a daring quest. He discovers that the key to defeating Damyaan lies in the past. With the help of a magical time-travel device, Bheem and his friends journey a thousand years back to the ancient city of Sonapur.

In Sonapur, they encounter a world vastly different from their own. The city is under Damyaan's oppressive rule, and its inhabitants suffer greatly. Bheem learns that Damyaan's immortality stems from a wish he made long ago. To save humanity, Bheem must prevent Damyaan from ever making that wish.

As Bheem and his gang navigate the challenges of the past, they unravel secrets, forge alliances, and face formidable adversaries. Along the way, they discover the true meaning of friendship, bravery, and sacrifice. The epic battle between good and evil unfolds in Sonapur, where destiny hangs in the balance.

== Cast ==
- Yagya Bhasin as Chhota Bheem "Bheem"
- Aashriya Mishra as Chutki
- Swarna Pandey as Princess Indumati
- Advik Jaiswal as Raju
- Divyam Dawar as Bholu
- Daivik Dawar as Dholu
- Kabir Sajid as Kalia
- Aryan Khan as Jaggu (voice)
- Raghav Sachar as Damyaan (voice)
- Anupam Kher as Guru Shambhu
- Makarand Deshpande as Skandhi
- Megha Chilaka as Bheem's mother
- Surbhi Tiwari as Tuntun Mausi, Chutki's mother
- Navneet Kaur Dhillon as Takshika
- Shaji Choudhary as Churan Singh
- Chandrashekhar Dutta as Singhala
- Sanjay Bishnoi as Raja Indraverma, Indumati's father
- Mukesh Chhabra as participant #2 at Bheem's wrestling match

== Production ==
On 14 September 2023, Rajiv Chilaka said in an Indian Express article that he is working on a live-action remake of the 2012 animated film of the same name.

== Music ==
The songs and background score for the film were composed by Raghav Sachar. The audio rights were acquired by Green Gold Music.The first single "Chhota Bheem" (Theme Song) was released on 6 April 2024. The second single "Dum Hai" was released on 26 April 2024. The third and last single "Zara Muskura" and "Jamboora" was released on 27 May 2024 respectively. The entire soundtrack album of the film was released on 29 May 2024.

Track listing
No.	Title	Lyrics	Singer(s)	Length
1.	"Chhota Bheem" (Theme Song)	Kunwar Juneja	Raghav Sachar; Jyotica Tangri; Kiaan Sachar; Riaan Rosemeyer; Simar Singh	2:49
2.	"Dum Hai"	Kunwar Juneja	Amit Mishra	3:52
3.	"Zara Muskura"	Kunwar Juneja	Shaan; Kiaan Sachar; Riaan Rosemeyer; Simar Singh	4:03
4.	"Jamboora"	Kunwar Juneja	Sukhwinder Singh	3:27

== Release ==
=== Theatrical ===
Chhota Bheem and the Curse of Damyaan was initially planned for release in theatres on 24 May 2024, but got postponed. It was released in theatres on 31 May 2024. A Telugu-language dubbed version was released on 7 June 2024.

UFO Moviez and Cinépolis jointly distributed the film. Asian Suresh Entertainment LLP bought the distribution rights for Andhra Pradesh and Telangana.

== Reception ==
=== Critical response ===
Riddhi Soni of Rediff gave 4/5 stars and wrote, "Overall, Chhota Bheem: The Curse of Damyaan is a fun movie, its adventurous story and lovable characters make it worth watching with family. So, get ready for a magical journey that'll leave you smiling". Ritika Choudhary of Times Now gave 3.5/5 stars and wrote, "Chhota Bheem And The Curse Of Damyaan is a must-watch for families with kids and for those who have loved Chhota Bheem since childhood. The film adds a new dimension to the animated series, bringing our favourite characters to life. The film ends on a high note, leaving the audience with a sense of joy and satisfaction". Mahpara Kabir of ABP Live gave 3.5/5 stars and wrote, "Chhota Bheem and the Curse of Damyaan is an action-filled adventure that brings nostalgia and excitement for kids and families. It's a perfect family movie to enjoy during school vacations".

Dhaval Roy of The Times of India gave 2.5/5 stars and wrote, "Young children may love seeing Bheem's classic encounters with Kalia and his gang, along with the exciting fights against monsters. But the length won't hold their attention in entirety and it may not appeal to older kids and adults". Troy Ribeiro of Free Press Journal gave 2 1/2 stars and wrote, "Overall, the film offers a mixed bag. It succeeds in delivering a vibrant but visually and narratively flawed fantasy adventure".
