= Ahiravan =

Ramayana character

Ahiravana
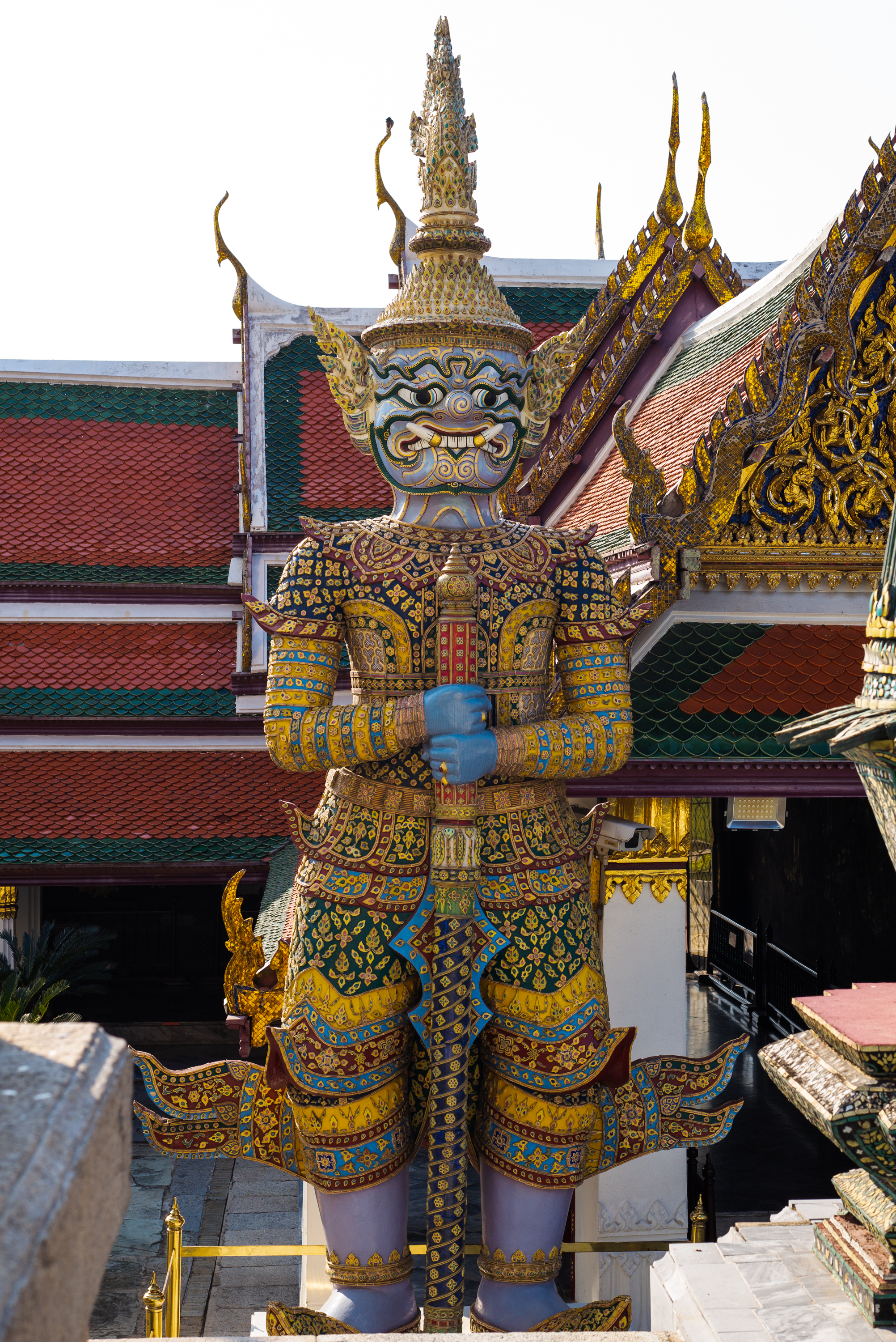
- Maiyarap, the Thai adaptation of ahiravana
- Affiliation: Rakshasa
- Abode: Patala
- Texts: Versions of Ramayana

Genealogy
- Spouse: Chandrasena

In some versions of the Ramayana such as the Krittivasi Ramayana, Ahiravana, is the brother of the rakshasa king Ravana. He secretly carried away Rama and his brother Lakshmana to the nether-world, consulted his friends, and decided to sacrifice the life of the two divine brothers at the altar of his chosen deity, goddess Mahamaya. However, Hanuman saved their lives by decapitating ahiravana, and destroying his army.

== Mahiravana and Panchmukhi Hanuman ==
Mahiravana is the king of the Patala (netherworld) and a trusted friend/brother of Ravana. After his son, Indrajita, was killed, Ravana sought Mahiravana's help to kill Rama and Lakshmana. One night, Mahiravana, using his maya, took Vibhishana's form and entered Rama's camp. He cast the nidra mantra (sleeping spell) on the vanara army, kidnapped Rama and Lakshmana, and took them to Patala to sacrifice them to Devi, as per Ravana's suggestion. Hanuman learnt the way to Patala from Vibhishana and made haste to rescue his lords. On his journey, he met Makardhwaja, who claimed of being Hanuman's son. Hanuman defeated and tied him, and went inside the palace. He met Chandrasena, who told about the sacrifice and the way to kill Mahiravana. Hanuman shrunk his size to that of a bee and came across a huge idol of Kali. After being prayed to, the goddess agreed to help Hanuman rescue the brothers, allowing him to take her place while she slipped below. When Mahiravana asked the brothers to bow, they refused, claiming not to know how to perform the act. As Mahiravana decided to demonstrate, Hanuman assumed his panchamukha (five-faced) form (manifesting the additional heads of Garuda, Narasimha, Varaha, and Hayagriva), blowing the five oil lamps present in the chamber in the five cardinal directions. He severed the head of Mahiravana, thus killing him. He carried Rama and Lakshmana upon his shoulders to return them to their camp, before which he released and crowned Makaradhvaja the king of Patala. The story of Ahiravan finds its place in the Ramayanas of the east. It can be found in the Bengali version of the Ramayana, written by Krittibash, in the passage known as Mahirabonerpala. It is believed that Kali, pleased with Hanuman, blessed him to be her dvarapala (gatekeeper).

== Popular culture ==
The Mairavan charitra was written in Telugu in Kavya style in the 16th century by Adithya kavi.

The story of Mahiravana was made into a Telugu film in 1940 by Ghantasala Balaramaiah entitled Mahiravana. The veteran actor Vemuri Gaggaiah played the role of Mahiravana. The legend was also featured in the 2018 animated film Hanuman vs Mahiravana, released in Hindi and Tamil and in the fifth season of the web-series The Legend of Hanuman.

== See also ==
- Adbhuta Ramayana
