= Rajiv Chilaka =

Indian animated film director and producer

Rajiv Chilakalapudi
- Education: Hyderabad Public School; Osmania University; University of Missouri - Kansas City
- Occupations: Creator & director of animated TV & films
- Organization: Green Gold
- Notable work: Chhota Bheem
- Website: greengold.tv

Rajiv Chilakalapudi, also known as Rajiv Chilaka and Sitarama Rajiv Chilakalapudi, is the founder and CEO of Hyderabad-based Green Gold Animations and the creator of a few cartoons including Krishna cartoon series and Chhota Bheem which has now been made into an animated series and films. For his work in presenting cartoons at affordable price, Chilaka was conferred with an honorary doctorate of humane letters by the Academy of Art University, San Francisco in 2016. He was the recipient of the 2013 School of Computing and Engineering Alumni Achievement Award at the University of Missouri - Kansas City.

== Early life ==
Rajiv is the youngest son of noted technocrat Madhusudan Rao Chilaka and his wife. Rajiv is an alumnus of Hyderabad Public School. He received his BE in Electronics and Telecommunications engineering from Osmania University, Hyderabad in 1995 and went on to the University of Missouri - Kansas City for his master's degree in Computer Science.

== Career ==
He started working as a software engineer in Kansas City for three years, but in 2000 he switched courses to study animation at the Academy of Art University, San Francisco. He has an elder brother, Srinivas Chilaka, who helps him in running Greengold.

The magazine Businessworld named Rajiv Chilaka's company Green Gold Animations and Gamitronics as two of the top ten companies in India for making visual content in 2023.

== Animation ==
In January 2001, Chilaka set up Green Gold Animation Pvt Ltd. According to a report in the Indian newspaper, The Hindu it is now "perhaps the largest animation production company in India that caters primarily to children."

His first break came in 2004 with the animation series Bongo about an alien who lands on Earth. That led to Vikram Betal, an 80-minute 2D animation on the Cartoon Network in 2005. Chilaka and his team made a series of four animated telefilms on the life of Krishna for the Cartoon Network, before its sister channel Pogo agreed to air their next project Chhota Bheem in 2008. According to Chilaka, a few episodes into the telecast of Chhota Bheem, Pogo TV told him that due to the losses suffered the channel can no longer remain in air. But such was the great success in the very next episodes that Pogo continued with content. Chhota Bheem changed everything.

Chilaka has told Wikipedia teams that he devised the concept of an Indian historically mythological hero, Chhota Bheem in 2005. During the first three years of the series Bheem was 'if not out-rightly presented at least allowed to be thought of' as a reincarnation of legendary warrior prince Bhima from Mahabharata but later on the concept itself was modified to make the village of Dholakpur and its inhabitants more contemporary showing episodes featuring things as disparate and modern as Bollywood, trains, aircraft etc. to emphasise the change. The first episode aired on 6 April 2008. As of 2012, more than 130 episodes have been telecast in English, Hindi, Telugu and Tamil on the Pogo TV. These have been accompanied by more than 10 Chhota Bheem television movies also on Pogo. It has been ranked as the most popular television character among children of 2012 by Ormax Media's Small Wonders.

In 2012, the feature film Chhota Bheem and the Curse of Damyaan written by Richa Ingle Deo and Seeta was released. It is considered to be the first Indian home-grown TV series to be made into a feature film. By November 2012, the movie had grossed 50 million Rupees at the box office.

In January 2016, the feature film Chhota Bheem Himalayan Adventure written by Teja Pratap and Chilaka was released. The film was directed by Rajiv Chilaka and Rusauro B. Adorable.

On 10 May 2019, another feature film titled Chhota Bheem: Kung Fu Dhamaka was released. The film's music was composed by Sunidhi Chauhan and the film was distributed by Yash Raj Films. The film just like the previous ones was directed and produced by Rajiv Chilaka. This was the first film to be released in both 2D and 3D formats.

=== Related series ===
The following series have been created by Green Gold Animations

Original Run	Series	Network	Notes
2004–2006	Bongo	DD National	
2006–2007	Krishna	Cartoon Network	4 part serialised film
2008–present	Chhota Bheem	Pogo	
2008–2010	Krishna and Balram	Cartoon Network	
2009–2012	Chorr Police	Disney XD India	
2011–present	Mighty Raju	Pogo	First spin-off of Chhota Bheem series
2012–2014	Luv Kushh	Disney XD	Series now in syndication on Discovery Kids India since 2015
2014 present 14–2016	Arjun - Prince of Bali	Disney Channel India	Spin off of 2013 film Chhota Bheem and the Throne of Bali; Second spin-off of Chhota Bheem series Reruns also aired on Disney XD in 2017
2017–present	Super Bheem	Pogo	Third spin-off of Chhota Bheem series
2017–present	Kalari Kids	Amazon Prime Video	
2018–present	Kicko & Super Speedo	Sony Yay	
2018–present	Rudra: Boom Chik Chik Boom	Nickelodeon India	
2019–present	Mighty Little Bheem	Netflix	Fourth spin-off of Chhota Bheem series
2021–present	Chhota Bheem: Adventures in Singapore	Voot Kids	Fifth spin-off of Chhota Bheem series.
2022–present	Bheem in the city	Pogo	Sixth spin-off of Chhota Bheem series and the follow-up mini series of the 2020 Chhota Bheem film Bheem in the city
2024–present	Bujji and Bhairava	Amazon Prime Video	Co-produced by Vyjayanthi Animation

=== Merchandising and demographics ===
The merchandising accompanying the popularity of the Chhota Bheem series has produced a range over 500 products such as DVDs, T-shirts, bedsheets, ceiling fans which are available at 20 Green Gold Stores across India as well as on-line games, comics and carnivals.

Chilaka, who directs each episode of the TV series and directed the movie, claims "the show has worked across demographics" by not being tied to a specific location in India and "it's followed equally by boys and girls."
