= Makaradhwaja =

Son of Hindu god Hanuman

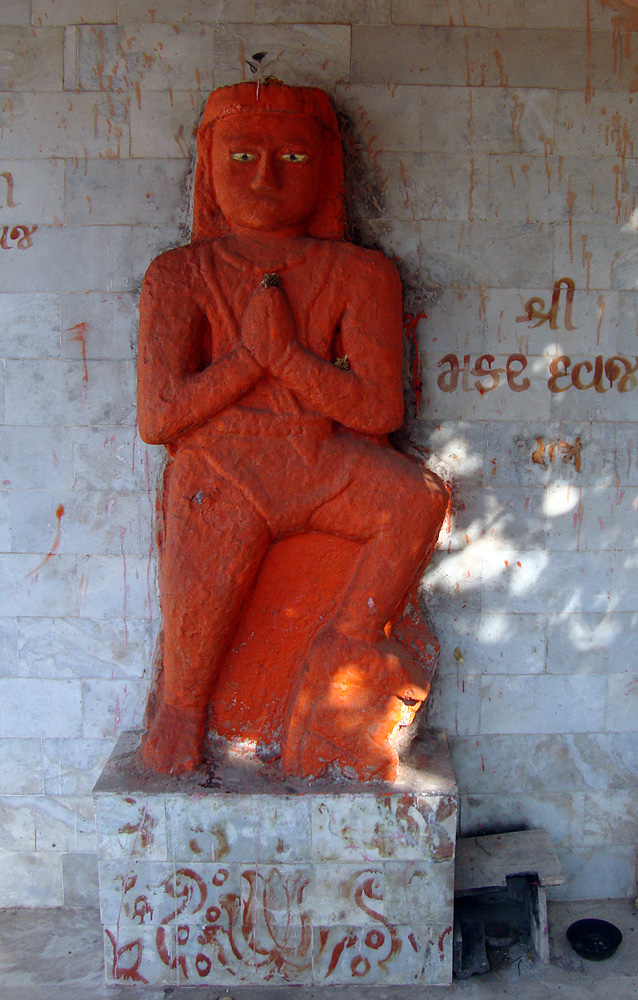
- Makardhwaja Temple at Odadar village near Porbandar, Gujarat

In-universe information
- Family: Hanuman (father); Kesari (grandfather); Añjanā (Grand mother)

Makaradhwaja (or Magardhwaja) is the son of Hindu god Hanuman who is born out of his sweat. Makaradhwaja has appearance in various regional versions of the Ramayana. There are many unmatching accounts of his birth, however all of them mentions him being born to a Makara (or Magara) after Hanuman took a dip into the ocean and his sweat drop fell into the mouth of the Makara, impregnating her. Makara begets Makaradhwaja who was later raised by the Ahiravana, a demon king who ruled Patala who was one of Ravana’s cousin. When he grew up, Ahiravana, seeing Makaradhwaja's strength and virility, gave him the job of guarding the gates of his kingdom.

== Birth and thereafter ==
When Hanuman took a dip in the waters of the sea (after burning down the whole of Lanka with his inflamed tail), a drop of his sweat fell into the mouth of a mighty Makara. Out of this, Makaradhwaja was born.

According to another, slightly different version, when Hanuman took a dip in the sea, to cool himself after burning Lanka; a drop of his sweat, due to the extreme heat generated in his body due to extreme labour by him, fell into the mouth of a giant fish-eating-reptile like creature, Makara, thus impregnating it.

The fish was caught by people of Ahiravana, who ruled Patala, the nether-world. Markardhwaja was discovered when the stomach of the fish was cut open and thus he was named after it and was brought up by them.

== Story in the Ramayana ==
The story of Makaradhwaja is not found in the original Ramayana. However, in local folk tales this story is related. When Ahiravana took Rama and Lakshmana to Patala, Hanuman followed them to their rescue. He was challenged at the gate of Patala by a creature, who was part Vanara and part reptile - a Makara. He introduced himself as Makaradhwaja the son of Hanuman, the mighty warrior.

Hanuman was amused and said that, he himself is Hanuman but he could not be his son, as he was Brahmachari (a celibate) since birth. However, Hanuman then closed his eyes in dhyana to see the events described above of Makaradhwaja's birth.

Makaradhwaja asked him for his blessings, however, he said to Hanuman, that he would have to fight him to enter Patala, as he cannot betray Ahiravana, his mentor. Hanuman defeats Makaradhwaja in a duel and then ties him to the back to proceed further to ultimately kill Ahiravana and rescue Rama & Lakshamana as Makardhawaja is presented as the exemplary devotee (bhakta) of Ahiravana as Hanuman for Rama.

== Lineage ==
The Jethwas claim their descent from Makaradhwaja. As per folk tales of their clan, Makaradhwaja had a son named Mod-dhwaja and he had a son named Jethi-dhwaja. Jethwas claim descant from Jethi-dhwaja and worship Hanuman as their Iṣṭa-devatā. The Jethwa dynasty of Gujarat, who once ruled major part of Kathiawar and later the princely state of Porbandar, therefore, had the image of Hanuman on their royal flag.

== Temples ==
Temples dedicated to Makaradhwaja can be found in India, especially in Gujarat, India where the Jethwas once ruled. Some noted temples in Gujarat and other places in India are at:

- Mandvi, of both Makaradhwaja and Hanuman
- Odadar village near Porbandar
- Hanuman Dandi temple at Bet Dwarka, where idols of Makaradhwaja and Hanuman are worshiped together
- Chinchawan, Wadwani, Maharashtra
- Karahiya near Gwalior, Madhya Pradesh
- Balaji Makaradhwaja, temple at Beawar, Rajasthan which is dedicated to both father-son duo in form of Balaji Hanuman and Makaradhwaja

== See also ==
- Macchanu, son of Hanuman and Suvannamachha as per Southeast Asian versions of the Ramayana
