= Chhota Bheem and the Throne of Bali =

2013 film by Rajiv Chilaka

- Theatrical release poster
- Directed by: Rajiv Chilaka
- Written by: Darshana Radhakrishnan; Teja Pratap
- Based on: Chhota Bheem by Rajiv Chilaka
- Produced by: Rajiv Chilaka; Samir Jain
- Edited by: Karthik Chilkuri
- Music by: Sunil Kaushik
- Production company: Green Gold Animation
- Distributed by: Yash Raj Films
- Release date: 3 May 2013
- Running time: 130 minutes
- Country: India
- Language: Hindi
- Budget: ₹5 crore
- Box office: ₹5.38 crore

Chhota Bheem and the Throne of Bali is a 2013 Indian Hindi-language animated fantasy action-adventure film directed by Rajiv Chilaka and produced by Chilaka and Samir Jain. The film, based on the Chhota Bheem series, is the sixteenth instalment in the Chhota Bheem film series and the second film in the series to be released in theatres.

Chhota Bheem and the Throne of Bali, distributed by Yash Raj Films, was released on 3 May 2013 in Hindi, alongside dubbed versions in English, Tamil, and Telugu. The film received mixed reviews from critics and was voted as the best animated feature film of 2013 by IBNLive.

== Production ==
The animated series Chhota Bheem launched in 2008. Due to its success, Green Gold Animation, an Indian animation content producer associated with PVR Pictures, released its first full-length movie, Chhota Bheem and the Curse of Damyaan. That movie was a surprise success at the Indian box office. This movie was also directed by Rajiv Chilaka, with Yash Raj Films distributing the film.

The film was produced in the summer, of 2010, while the prequels Chhota Bheem and the Curse Of Damyaan and Chhota Bheem: Master of Shaolin were still in development. Chilaka read a newspaper article about Bali and was inspired to create another full-length movie with Green Gold Animation. He began to work on the movie in Fall 2010, and it was released on May 3, 2013.

== Release and reception ==
The film was distributed by Yash Raj Films and released to 400 screens on 3 May 2013.

=== Box office ===
The film earned 2.52 crore rupees in the first week. The film earned ₹ 5.38 crore during its run.

=== Critical response ===
Professional ratings
Review scores
Source	Rating
The Times of India	3/5 stars
Sify	3/5 stars

It received mixed reviews from critics. The Times of India reviewer found the animation quality of the film far better than that of other contemporary Indian works and appreciated the simple storytelling in the film. Sonia Chopra of Sify, in her review, found the film "critic-proof" and gave it 3 out of 5 stars.

7 years old Miraya Mitra Saigal reviewed the film for Firstpost. She called the film "better than the Damyaan movie", film which she and her mother "left half-way through" last year.

== See also ==
- Arjun – Prince of Bali, animated TV show spun-off from the film
- Indian animation industry
- List of Indian animated feature films
