= Chhota Bheem =

Indian animated television series

- Chhota Bheem
- Also known as: Little Bheem
- Written by: Nidhi Anand; Darsana Radhakrishnan; Teja Pratap
- Directed by: Rajiv Chilaka; Binayak Das
- Opening theme: "Chhota Bheem"
- Ending theme: "Chhota Bheem" (Karaoke)
- Country of origin: India
- Original languages: Hindi; Telugu; Tamil; Kannada; Marathi; Malayalam

Production
- Running time: 11 minutes
- Production company: Green Gold Animations

Original release
- Network: Pogo TV
- Release: 6 April 2008 – present

Related
- Mighty Raju; Arjun - Prince of Bali; Mighty Little Bheem

Chhota Bheem (transl. Little Bheem) is an Indian animated comedy adventure television series, created by Green Gold Animations based in Hyderabad. This show is available in English, Hindi, Telugu, Tamil, Kannada, Malayalam and Marathi. Bheem is a brave, strong and intelligent young boy with a fondness for laddus. He often manages to solve everyone's problems which endears him to the townspeople of Dholakpur.

== Plot ==
The series is set in a village in the kingdom of Dholakpur. The series revolves around Bheem, sometimes referred to as Chhota Bheem due to his young age, a boy who is strong and intelligent.

Bheem is a well-loved figure in the village, known for his good heart and helping nature. His closest friends are Chutki, Raju, and a talking monkey named Jaggu.

The show revolves around Bheem and his team using their skills to solve various problems affecting the village, unravel mysteries, fight evil villains that seek to harm Dholakpur and/or its inhabitants, or foil the plans of their rivals Kalia, Dholu, and Bholu, who aim to embarrass Bheem. Their antics also sometimes get them into trouble.

Supernatural events have often been used in some episodes like Dholakpur being attacked by the demon king Kirmada or the evil witch. Bheem and his friends participating in various competitions in Dholakpur or adjoining kingdoms are also a common theme, as is the celebration of Indian festivities and the protection of nature.

== Characters ==
=== Main ===
- Chhota Bheem: Chhota Bheem is the main protagonist of the show. He is a 9-year old young boy. Bheem is an adventurous, fun-loving but virtuous boy who is gifted with superhuman strength. This strength can be powered up by consuming ladoos, his favourite food. Bheem appears bare-chested, wearing an orange dhoti and a gold pendant. He has brown hair. (Voiced by Sonal Kaushal)
- Chutki: Chutki is a young 7-year old girl and the daughter of Tuntun Mausi, the sweet-maker. She often helps Bheem sneak ladoos from her mother's shop. Chutki is the brains of the team. She's depicted as fair-skinned having pink blush applied on her cheeks wearing a purple floral lehenga and has her brown hair in twin braids. Her name means young or little one. (Voiced by Rupa Bhimani)
- Raju: Raju is a daring, and mischievous 4-year old boy, he is a bald toddler with only two strands of hair on his head who wears nothing but his blue underpants. (Voiced by Julie Tejwani)
- Jaggu: Jagadeesh "Jaggu" Bandar is a blue, talking monkey. Jaggu has a special way of solving problems, using tricks accompanied by his sense of humour. Bheem learns useful techniques like swinging from trees from him. He can also communicate with other animals. Whenever they are really hungry, Jaggu assists them in stealing ladoos. He also loves playing tricks on Kalia, Dholu and Bholu. (Voiced by Rajesh Kava)
- Kalia: Kalia is an envious bully. He is 10-years old and depicted as an ambitious boy who is always outshone by Bheem. He has two fearful lackeys, Dholu and Bholu, twin brothers who sometimes help him with his plans and, at other times, quickly abandon him. He often blows his own trumpet by claiming he is the strongest and most courageous person. Whenever any problem arises, he runs away. Despite his competitive personality, he also helps the gang out for important matters (such as an attack on Dholakpur) and will put aside his own rivalries and pride for the greater good. And whenever he witnesses Bheem's other rivalry with Kichak, he'll often show support towards Bheem. He is depicted as a tall and overweight boy wearing only a short tied-up grey dhoti and lots of gold jewellery. (Voiced by Shaily Dubey)
- Dholu and Bholu: Dholu and Bholu are identical twins and followers of Kalia. Though they are not strong themselves, they bask in Kalia's strength. Despite their support for a bully, they have kind hearts and have also won a trophy for their close brotherhood. But sometimes, they argue among themselves and get scolded by Kalia. They are differentiated by their clothing, each twin wears a similar set of olive green and brown turban, t-shirt and pants with opposite colouring. (Voiced by Jigna Bhardwaj)

=== Recurring ===
- Rajkumari Indumati: Indumati is the princess of Dholakpur, the daughter of Indraverma, and the elder sister of Ravi Varma. She is a kindhearted 7-year old girl. She is also a friend of Bheem, Chutki, Raju, Jaggu, Kalia, Dholu and Bholu. She has blue eyes, and reddish-brown hair, and wears a blue and gold lehenga with an orange flower adorning her hair in a low ponytail. While she seldom joins the gang on missions, she is a trusted friend and supports them. (Voiced by Samridhii Shukla)
- Raja Indraverma: The king of Dholakpur and the father of both Indumati and Ravi Varma. He lives in a palace on top of a hill overlooking Dholakpur. He mostly relies on Bheem for any crisis in the kingdom and trusts the boy greatly. He has two sisters- one of them is Arjun’s mother and Queen of Bali due to her marriage to Bali’s King Sahdev Verma while the other one whose name is yet to reveal, is wife of cunning Jaivardhan and mother to Vishnuvardhan. (Voiced by Rajesh Shukla)
- Kichak: Kichak is a 16-year old wrestler from Pehelwanpur. Like Kalia, Kichak is also jealous of Bheem, since Bheem is more popular than him. He often challenges Bheem in various games to prove himself stronger than him, but is always defeated. Taking his adolescent age into consideration, Kichak's rivalry with Bheem can be a bit more severe than Kalia's. He has many friends like Chhota Manu, Birju, Manna and Popatya who are his loyal followers. (Voiced by Rajesh Kava)
- Chhota Manu: He is also a character from Pehelwanpur. Chhota Manu is physically strong and clever. He is a rival of Raju, whom he never managed to defeat. He is a sidekick as well as a friend of Kichak, making various plans to defeat Bheem.
- Daku Mangal Singh: Mangal Singh is a bandit who used to terrorize Dholakpur when he was free. But he was arrested by Bheem. He often comes to rob Dholakpur.
- Dhooni Baba: Dhooni Baba is a sage who lives in a cave. In the former episodes, he was called "Baba Bol Bachchan" had a body smeared with ash and was seen meditating on some needles. Indeed, Dhooni means “incense”. Later, his body has no ash smeared and he walks with a walking stick. He is described as a sage who knows almost everything and has divine powers. He gives advice and also a solution to Bheem and his friends.
- Tuntun Mausi: Tuntun, or Tuntun aunt, she is Chutki's mother. She owns a sweet shop where she sells her famous homemade ladoos. Bheem often aggravates her by stealing ladoos, but she is also kind-hearted like Chutki. Sometimes she gives Bheem ladoos to make him stronger and help him defeat his enemies.
- Professor Shastri Dhoomketu: He is an inventor who lives in Gyanpur (“village of knowledge”). He often ends up getting problems with his inventions, like getting his inventions stolen, or malfunctioning. His inventions include a time machine, a hot air balloon, a super-fast bicycle, etc.
- Shivani: Bheem's foster sister is Shivani. She lives in Pehelwanpur and runs a dhaba there named "Shivani ka Dhaba" along with her mother. Her father is falsely imprisoned by the cruel king, and to free him she needs 500 gold coins. But the pehalwan (wrestler) Dabbu tries to take over the Dhaba. Bheem comes to her rescue and even frees her father from jail. Their close relationship is demonstrated in an episode where she sent Bheem a letter on Raksha Bandhan, not writing much, leading Bheem to think something was suspicious and going to see her. After he solved her problems she tied a rakhi on his wrist.
- Buri Jadugarni (transl. The Evil Sorceress): Buri Jadugarni is an evil sorceress who is an enemy of Bheem. She tried to become the queen of Dholakpur but never succeeded because of Bheem and his team. She is also called Buri Pari (transl. Evil Fairy) or Buri Chudail (transl. Evil Witch).
- Acchi Jadugarni (transl. The Good Sorceress): She is a good Sorceress who helps Bheem in defeating Buri Jadugarni. She is also called Achhi Pari (transl. Good Fairy). She lives in Agadam, a place of good wizards and witches or in the forest of Dholakpur.
- Avi Chacha: He is another scientist who lives in Dholakpur. He is also a friend of Professor Shastri Dhoomketu. He invented many gadgets but all were destroyed.

==== Bheem's family ====
Bheem has a family of five members:

- Mother: Bheem's unnamed mother lives with him in their home. She is shown as a cameo in many episodes and some movies.
- Grandfather: Bheem's grandfather is also a fighter like Bheem. Bheem resembles his grandfather in the fighting. His grandfather owns a magical trunk having magical items in it. He also likes ladoos.
- Father: He was shown in the episode Diwali Dhamaka and was responsible for bringing the two-headed demon to Dholakpur. But also gives an idea to Bheem regarding Demon's death. But in the movie Bheem in the City, Bheem’s father, whose name is Abhimanyu, works in Raunak Sheher.

=== Guests ===
- Kirmada: He is a demon who tries to attack Dholakpur. He has appeared in the Chhota Bheem and Krishna film series and also in a few of the Super Bheem film series.
- Ganesha: Ganesha was shown in the movie Chhota Bheem and Ganesha in the Amazing Odyssey and was also shown in some episodes and other films.
- Krishna: Krishna is a character who occurs in a few episodes and in the movies Chhota Bheem Aur Krishna, Chhota Bheem Aur Krishna Vs Zimbara, Chhota Bheem Aur Kaalsura Ka Jadui Jaal, Chhota Bheem and Krishna in the Rise of Kirmada and Chhota Bheem and Krishna in the Patliputra City of Dead and Dwarka - The Lost City and Chhota Bheem and Krishna in Mayanagri. He also appears in one of the top recent films of Chhota Bheem released in October 2021, Chhota Bheem Ki Citti Pitti Gul.
- Hanuman: Hanuman was also shown in this show in a movie Chhota Bheem Aur Hanuman.
- Zimbara and Mayandri: They are the siblings of Kirmada.

== Production ==
=== Development ===
Rajiv Chilaka wanted to create his own intellectual property instead of working for other companies. He established his animation studio Green Gold Animation in 2001. He had to struggle as no TV channel was ready to pick up the Indian animation content and most Indian contents aired were mythological. His company produced Vikram Betal and Krishna animation shows which convinced Pogo TV to give it a chance. After five years of conception, Chhota Bheem made its first appearance in 2008 on Pogo TV. It succeeded and continued to run. He is financed by Samir Jain, who belongs to the famous Jain-cum-Agarwal business family from Meerut. Raj Viswanadha, who did the writing for the first four years of Bheem before leaving the series, Arun Shendurnikar, Nidhi Anand are prominent among those who have written the stories for the show.

=== Influences ===
Rajiv Chilaka had conceived an adventurous young boy with the strength and attributes of Bhima from Mahabharata, living in an unspecified period in medieval India. He was also influenced by his childhood spent with Disney's animated shows, Tintin, Amar Chitra Katha and other superhero comics.

== Broadcast ==
It is aired on Pogo TV in India. As of August 2011, more than 200 episodes, 5 movies have been released and aired.

In April 2020, DD National acquired the syndication rights of the series from 17 April 2020 to 3 May 2020 when the production of the ongoing series had to be stopped by the channel due to COVID-19 pandemic.

== Films ==
=== Chhota Bheem films ===
==== Animated films ====
- Chhota Bheem Aur Krishna
- Chhota Bheem and Ganesh in the Amazing Odyssey
- Chhota Bheem Aur Krishna in Pataliputra
- Bheem vs Aliens
- Chhota Bheem: Journey to Petra
- Chhota Bheem & Krishna: Mayanagari
- Chhota Bheem Master of Shaolin
- Chhota Bheem: Dholakpur to Kathmandu
- Chhota Bheem Aur Hanuman
- Chhota Bheem and The Rise of Kirmada (2012)
- Chhota Bheem and the Curse of Damyaan (2012)
- Chhota Bheem And The Broken Amulet
- Chhota Bheem The Crown Of Valhalla
- Chhota Bheem and the Throne of Bali (2013)
- Chhota Bheem aur Krishna vs Zimbara
- Chhota Bheem and The Shinobi Secret
- Chhota Bheem and the Incan Adventure
- Chhota Bheem Neeli Pahadi
- Chhota Bheem Ki Baazi
- Chhota Bheem aur Paanch Ajoobe
- Chhota Bheem Aur Chhalchhaaya
- Chhota Bheem: Mayavi Gorgan
- Chhota Bheem Banjara Masti
- Chhota Bheem Dus pe Dus
- Chhota Bheem: Dinosaur World
- Chhota Bheem and Sky Dragon
- Chhota Bheem: Mission Mangalayan
- Chhota Bheem in African Safari
- Chhota Bheem Himalayan Adventure (2016)
- Chhota Bheem Singapura Ka Rahasya
- Chhota Bheem Ka Troll Se Takkar
- Chhota Bheem Aur Kaala Yodha
- Chhota Bheem Ka Romani Adventure
- Bheemayan
- Chhota Bheem and The Rise of Damyaan
- Chhota Bheem: Kung Fu Dhamaka (2019)
- Chhota Bheem Aur Nawadir ke Shehzaade
- Chhota Bheem Ka Roosi Romanch
- Chhota Bheem aur Kaalsura ka Jaadui Jall
- Chhota Bheem aur Arazim Ka Raaz
- Bheem Ban Gaya Super Star
- Bheem In The City
- Chhota Bheem Aur Malongh Ka Raaz
- Chhota Bheem Ki Citti Pitti Gul
- Chhota Bheem Aur Chand Pari Ki Dastan
- Veer Bahadur Bheem
- Chhota Bheem And The Legend of El Magnifico
- Chhota Bheem Aur Mahavinashini Ka Vinash
- Chhota Bheem and the Return of Dragar
- Chhota Bheem Mahavinashi Ka Badla
- Chhota Bheem Yamlok Ki Khoj
- Chhota Bheem Aur Registaan Ka Shehenshah
- Chhota Bheem Ka Aflatooni Arabian Adventure
- Chhota Bheem Mahashaitaan ka Mahayudh
- Chhota Bheem Bhootnagri Chopat Raja
- Chhota Bheem Shakti Astra ki Khoj
- Aag Aur Pani Ki Takkar (Crossover with Little Singham)
- Chhota Bheem aag aur pani ka badla
- Dholakpur Ki Dastaan
- Chhota Bheem Trishira Ka Tehelka
- Chhota Bheem Kank Bahadur ka Khazana
- Chhota Bheem and Little Singham Do Ka Dum Part 1
- Chhota Bheem and Little Singham Do Ka Dum Part 2

==== Live-action films ====
- Chhota Bheem and the Curse of Damyaan (2024)

=== Super Bheem films ===
- Main Hoon Super Bheem
- Super Bheem Hawa Mein Halla
- Super Bheem Fire And Ice
- Super Bheem Aakhiri Chunauti
- Super Bheem Planet Toyz
- Super Bheem Samudri Lootere
- Super Bheem Bana Vajraveer
- Super Bheem Antaariksh Ke Rakhwale
- Super Bheem Kirmada Ki Wapasi
- Super Bheem Aur Dragonkala Ka Rahasya
- Super Bheem Trayodash Ki Kahaani
- Super Bheem in Dragonpur
- Super Bheem Ke Super Jasoos
- Super Bheem Toota Kushtaara

== Specials ==
- Chhota Bheem Kirmada Ka Keher
- Chhota Bheem Rangda Ka Mayajaal
- Chhota Bheem Damyaan Ki Dehshat
- Chhota Bheem Zuhu ka Zalzala
- Chhota Bheem aur Gadadhari Bheem
- Chhota Bheem Vinashbeej Ka Vinash
- Chhota Bheem Andhakarmay Ka Raaj
- Chhota Bheem Aur Bal Hanuman
- Chhota Bheem Pretpur Ka Kala Saaya
- Chhota Bheem Aur Tabora Ka Maha-Muqaabala
- Chhota Bheem Damyan Ka Badla
- Chhota Bheem Kirmada Aur Zuhu Quyamat Shuru
- Chhota Bheem Mahashaitaan ka Mahavar
- Chhota Bheem Bhakshak ki Bhookh
- Chhota Bheem Vs Kirmada Clash of Multiverse

== Spin-offs ==
=== Mighty Raju ===
Mighty Raju is the first spin-off series of Chhota Bheem, which reimagines the character of Raju in the modern world, with superpowers and is known as "Mighty Raju". He lives in the modern city, Aryanagar.

=== Arjun – Prince of Bali ===
Arjun – Prince of Bali is the second spin-off series of Chhota Bheem based on the Chhota Bheem and the Throne of Bali character Arjun. Arjun is the young prince of Bali. It features his adventures with his friends and pet Zimbu, a baby tiger. Each episode consists of two stories and is targeted at kids up to 13 years of age. The series shows the adventures of Arjun during his childhood. It exists in the same timeline as Chhota Bheem. The series aired from 1 June 2014 to 11 September 2016 on Disney Channel India.

=== Super Bheem ===
Super Bheem, a third spin-off series of Chhota Bheem, was launched in 2017. but originally it was launched in May 2016, with the birthday special movie Main Hoon Super Bheem. It is an updated version of Bheem with superpowers. Super Bheem is based on Chhota Bheem: Sky Dragon. The Super Bheem show is 3D animation whereas the Chhota Bheem is traditional 2D animation. It originally premiered on Pogo TV in 2017, and aired in 2019 on Cartoon Network.

=== Mighty Little Bheem ===
Mighty Little Bheem, a fourth spin-off, launched in 2019 on Netflix. It is intended for younger children. In this series, the story's focus is on 1 or 2-year-old Bheem.

=== Chhota Bheem: Kung Fu Dhamaka ===
Chhota Bheem: Kung Fu Dhamaka is the fifth spin-off of Chhota Bheem, and launched on January 12, 2020. It was the third series in 3D CGI format.

== Other media ==
Green Gold Animation launched merchandise and comics in 2009, and toys in 2010. They had a brand association with many products such as a drink, soups, fans, stationery, bags, and biscuits. They also produced mobile games, including educational ones. The merchandise portfolio expanded to more than 300 products, and they established a merchandise store franchise Green Gold Store, which has stores in several cities in India.

== See also ==
- List of Indian animated television series
