= UFO Moviez =

Indian digital cinema distribution network

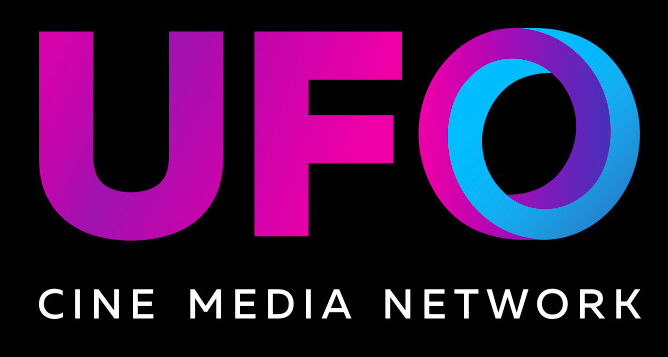
- Type: Public
- Traded as: BSE: 539141; NSE: UFO
- Industry: Cinema advertising
- Founded: 2004
- Founder: Sanjay Shankar Gaikwad; Narendra Hete
- Headquarters: Mumbai, India
- Area served: Worldwide
- Key people: Sanjay Shankar Gaikwad (Managing Director)
- Website: www.ufomoviez.com

UFO Moviez India Limited is an Indian digital cinema distribution network and an in-cinema advertising platform. It operates a satellite-based digital cinema distribution network using its UFO-M4 platform and D-Cinema network. UFO Moviez is a company in the business of electronic delivery of digitized full-length feature films and content in theatres via satellite. UFO has also contributed to the revival of single screen cinemas in India and its secure technology has substantially reduced Piracy. UFO has ensured that audiences have ‘day of release’ access to films everywhere. UFO Moviez claimed to have released more than 11,000 films in 22 languages, on its UFO M4-Platform and DCI Network and has conducted over 21 million shows.

== History ==
Founded in 2005, UFO Moviez has been promoted by Valuable Group led by Sanjay Gaikwad & Narendra Hete and Apollo International Limited led by Kanwar Raaja. Valuable Group is, amongst other businesses, engaged in the digital cinema space, film distribution business and delivers, stores and plays movies in private theatres. Apollo International has different business segments such as international trading of tyres, various commodities, products and services, manufacturing and export of leather garments and logistics. In 2007, 3i Private Equity invested US$22mn. with an aim of funding the company's expansion plans. In 2011, Providence Equity Partners provided growth capital by investing US$60mn. in primary and secondary capital. In 2011, UFO acquired controlling stake in South India based Southern Digital Solutions (SDS), and the only DCI System Integrator in India – Scrabble Entertainment. In 2015, UFO Moviez made a stellar debut on Indian Bourses.

== Products ==
=== Digital Cinema System ===
UFO-M4 is UFO's satellite-based, E-Cinema movie delivery platform.
