= Chhota Bheem: Kung Fu Dhamaka =

2019 film by Rajiv Chilaka

Chhota Bheem Kung Fu Dhamaka
- Theatrical release poster
- Directed by: Rajiv Chilaka
- Based on: Chhota Bheem by Rajiv Chilaka
- Produced by: Rajiv Chilaka
- Music by: Sunidhi Chauhan
- Production company: Green Gold Animations
- Distributed by: Yash Raj Films (India)
- Release date: 10 May 2019 (India)
- Running time: 113 minutes
- Country: India
- Language: Hindi
- Box office: ₹3.65 crore (US$380,000)

Chhota Bheem: Kung Fu Dhamaka is a 2019 Indian Hindi-language animated martial arts film directed and produced by Rajiv Chilaka. The film is based on the characters Chhota Bheem and his friends and is the fourth theatrical film of Chhota Bheem.

Chhota Bheem: Kung Fu Dhamaka was released on 10 May 2019 in 2D and 3D version (alongside its English dubbed version) and received mixed reviews from critics.

== Plot ==
Chhota Bheem and his friends, Chutki, Raju, Jaggu, Kalia, Dholu and Bholu are assigned by Raja Indravarma to participate in a prestigious martial arts event in Dragonland, China. Bheem and his friends agree and participates in martial arts competition, where the world's top fighters have also assembled there. Zuhu is an evil part-demon and the nephew of Dragonland's Emperor Jian, who was banished by Jian for trying to kill Jian's daughter Kia as she was chosen as the heir instead of Zuhu. During the competition, Zuhu arrives and kidnaps Kia as she is the patronage of a powerful mystical dragon and Zuha wants to absorb Kia's powers in order to rule the universe. Along with Jian and Dragonland people's support, Bheem and his friends rescues Kia and they escape by summoning the dragon from the dragon stone, which was requested by Kia in order to save Ming. Kia reunites with Jian, while Bheem and his friends wins the competition and also earn love and respect from the people in Dragonland.

== Characters ==
- Bheem

=== Bheem's friends ===
- Chutki
- Raju
- Jaggu
- Kalia
- Dholu and Bholu

=== Other characters ===
- Ming, Bheem's friend and the heir of Shaolin kung-fu school
- Kia, Emperor Jian's daughter and princess of Dragonland
- Zuhu, a part-demon and Jian's nephew
- Emperor Jian, Kia's father and the king of Dragonland

== Reception ==
=== Critical response ===
Pallabi Dey Purkayastha of The Times of India gave 3/5 stars and wrote "Despite the minor hiccups, ‘Chhota Bheem: Kung Fu Dhamaka’ largely works due to its strong emotional content." Shubhra Gupta of The Indian Express gave 3/5 stars and wrote "What struck me about its newest addition to the adventures of little Bheem is the surprisingly terrific quality of animation: except for a flash or two which harks back to the bad old days of clunckiness, this is world class."

Troy Ribeiro of News18 gave 2.5/5 stars and wrote "Visually, the film is brilliantly mounted. Each frame is colourful and appealing and the voices of the ace cast are matched perfectly. The story is simple and meanders aimlessly through a standard formulaic treatment, making the viewing a not so exciting fare." Raja Sen of Hindustan Times gave 2/5 stars and wrote "The glossy new movie has barely an original bone in its well-animated body. It needed spirit, some vim, some animated flair."

== Spin-off ==
A spin-off animated television series of the same name was aired in 2020.

== See also ==
- Indian animation industry
- List of indian animated feature films
