= Green Gold Animations =

Indian animation company

Green Gold Animation Pvt. Ltd.
- Type: Private Company
- Industry: Motion pictures
- Founded: 2001; 25 years ago
- Founder: Rajiv Chilaka
- Headquarters: Hyderabad, Telangana, India
- Key people: Rajiv Chilaka (Founder & CEO); Srinivas Chilakalapudi (COO); Murali Krishna Yarla (CFO); Bharath Laxmipati (CMO)
- Products: Animated films
- Website: www.greengold.tv

Green Gold Animation Pvt. Ltd., is a Hyderabad-based Indian animation company, with offices in India, Singapore, and the Philippines. It is known for creating the Chhota Bheem television series and the Krishna film series. Green Gold Animation was founded by Rajiv Chilaka in January 2001.

As of now, Green Gold Animation handles various branches of business such as Licensing & Merchandising, Digital Business, Branded Stores, Events and Pictures. Green Gold has produced several animated series, beginning with Bongo, Krishna, Krishna & Balram, Chhota Bheem, Vikram Betal, Chorr Police, Mighty Raju, Luv Kushh and Arjun - Prince of Bali. Super Bheem, a 3D spin-off of Chhota Bheem with superpowers has begun as a series of short films in 2017.

Green Gold Animation has won numerous awards for its production and brand management, which includes four FICCI Awards, a Business Excellency Award in 2014, two Licensor of the year awards in 2012 and 2013, and its founder and CEO, Rajiv Chilaka won the CII Emerging Entrepreneur Award in 2011.

In 2016, Amazon Prime Video acquired the rights of digital streaming from Green Gold Animation.

== Subsidiary ==
Green Gold Animation launched Golden Robot Animation, an animation studio in Mumbai in July, 2017.

== Filmography ==
=== Television ===
Year	Title	Network	Notes
2004–2006	Bongo	DD National	
2006–2007	Krishna	Cartoon Network	4-part serialised film
2008–present	Chhota Bheem	Pogo	
2008–2010	Krishna Balram	Cartoon Network	
2009–2012	Chorr Police	Disney XD India	
2011–present	Mighty Raju	Pogo	First spin-off of Chhota Bheem series
2012–2014	Luv Kushh	Disney XD	Series now in syndication on Discovery Kids India since 2015
2014–2016	Arjun – Prince of Bali	Pogo	Spin off of 2013 film Chhota Bheem and the Throne of Bali; Second spin-off of Chhota Bheem series Reruns also aired on Disney XD in 2017
2017–present	Super Bheem	Pogo	Third spin-off of Chhota Bheem series
2017	Kalari Kids	Amazon Prime Video	
2018–present	Kicko & Super Speedo	Sony Yay	
2018–present	Rudra: Boom Chik Chik Boom	Nickelodeon	
2019–2020	Mighty Little Bheem	Netflix	Fourth spin-off of Chhota Bheem series
2020	Chhota Bheem: Kung Fu Dhamaka	Pogo TV	Spin-off of 2019 film Chhota Bheem: Kung Fu Dhamaka; Fifth spin-off of Chhota Bheem series
2024	Bujji and Bhairava	Amazon Prime Video	
2025	Obocchama-kun	Sony Yay	Reboot of the original 1989 series, based on the manga series of the same name by Yoshinori Kobayashi. Supervised by Shin-Ei Animation and produced by TV Asahi for Sony Pictures Networks.

=== Film ===
Year	Title	Notes
2012	Chhota Bheem and the Curse of Damyaan	First theatrical release of Chhota Bheem franchise
2013	Chhota Bheem and the Throne of Bali	Second theatrical release of Chhota Bheem franchise
2014	Mighty Raju : Rio Calling	First theatrical release of Mighty Raju franchise
2016	Chhota Bheem Himalayan Adventures	Third theatrical release of Chhota Bheem franchise
2018	Hanuman vs Mahiravana	
2019	Chhota Bheem Kung Fu Dhamaka	Fourth theatrical release of Chhota Bheem franchise
2024	Chhota Bheem and the Curse of Damyaan	Live-action remake of 2012 film

== See also ==
- List of Indian animated television series
