= Mighty Little Bheem =

- Genre: Comedy
- Created by: Rajiv Chilaka
- Based on: Chhota Bheem
- Country of origin: India
- No. of seasons: 3
- No. of episodes: 64

Production
- Running time: 6 minutes
- Production company: Green Gold Animations

Original release
- Network: Netflix
- Release: April 12, 2019 – September 18, 2020

Related
- Chhota Bheem; Mighty Raju; Arjun - Prince of Bali; Super Bheem

Mighty Little Bheem is an animated children's television series, Netflix's first animated series from India and the fourth spin-off of the Chhota Bheem series, following Mighty Raju, Arjun - Prince of Bali and Super Bheem. It follows an innocent but super-strong toddler, Little Bheem, on his mischievous adventures in a small Indian town. The toddler is a baby version of the mythological-inspired 9-year-old character from the popular Indian series action comedy animated series Chhota Bheem which has aired on Turner Broadcasting's Pogo TV channel from 2008.

== Production ==
In 2016, after the launch of Netflix in India, Aram Yacoubian, director of kids and family content at the US streaming service, first met Rajiv Chilaka of Green Gold Animation, and agreed on a series that would target the age group of 6–11. To make it universal, the decision was made to make it non-verbal. The show was in production for 18 months, starting in July 2017 and led by Green Gold's teams in Hyderabad and Mumbai.

Green Gold Animations has become one of India's largest toon companies, with studios in Hyderabad, Mumbai, and Kolkata, as well as international outposts in Los Angeles, Singapore, and the Philippines.

== Series overview ==
Series overview
Season	Episodes	Originally released
1	21	April 12, 2019
2	28	August 30, 2019
3	15	September 18, 2020

== Release ==
Mighty Little Bheem season 1 was released on 12 April 2019 on Netflix. Season 2 was released on August 30, 2019. A third season was released on September 18, 2020.

== Specials ==
A special collection of three episodes titled Mighty Little Bheem: Diwali was made available on October 27, 2019, on the occasion of Diwali.

A second special collection of three episodes titled Mighty Little Bheem: Festival of Colors was made available on March 5, 2020.

A third special collection of three episodes titled Mighty Little Bheem: Kite Festival was made available on January 8, 2021.

A fourth special of short film titled Mighty Little Bheem: I Love Taj Mahal was made available on May 30, 2022.
