= Chhota Bheem and the Curse of Damyaan (2012 film) =

Chhota Bheem and The Curse Of Damyaan
- Theatrical release poster
- Directed by: Rajiv Chilaka
- Written by: Richa Ingle Deo & Seeta
- Screenplay by: Teja Pratap
- Based on: Chhota Bheem by Rajiv Chilaka
- Produced by: Samir Jain
- Production company: Green Gold Animation
- Distributed by: PVR Pictures
- Release date: 18 May 2012 (India)
- Running time: 88 minutes
- Country: India
- Language: Hindi
- Budget: ₹4.50 crore
- Box office: ₹5.51 crore

Chhota Bheem and the Curse of Damyaan is a 2012 Indian Hindi-language animated fantasy action adventure film written and directed by Rajiv Chilaka, based on the character Chhota Bheem and his friends. It is the eleventh film in the Chhota Bheem film series and the first one to be released in theatres. The film was made under the Green Gold Animation banner in association with INOX Cinemas and distributed by PVR Pictures worldwide.

== Plot ==
In Dholakpur, Princess Indumati and a few other children are kidnapped by Mangal Singh. Chhota Bheem arrives and saves the children Meanwhile, Jaggu, Dholu-Bholu, Raju, Chutki and Kalia are planning their Bheem's secret birthday party while Damyaan, a demon who was granted immortality by the Book of Magi along with a curse that he would be confined to the city of Sonapur, wants to escape from this confinement and get back his power and kingdom. Damyaan's minister, Skandi hijacks and loots trade convoy headed for Dholakpur and meets King Indravarma, who assigned the delivery of the convoy. Bheem suspects Skandi and the rest of his gang, before he can speak to Indravarma, Skandi reveals about the depleting treasury of Dholakpur and the hidden treasures of Sonapur, thus luring him. In reality, he wants to trick Indravarma to release Damyaan. Indravarma agrees to leave for the city in search of that hidden treasure. Despite being warned by the gypsies, he begins the journey, along with Bheem and his friends. After reaching the city, the king unknowingly sets Damyaan free through the great demon entrance.

Damyaan captures the king, along with Bheem and his friends in the prison. Bheem manages to set his friends free through his wit and strength, where he meets Singhala, who reveals that the only way to free the prisoners from Damyaan's capture is defeating Damyaan by destroying the Book of Magi. Singhala sends them back in time where the while trying to find the Book of Magi. A fight ensues, in which Dholu-Bholu are turned into frogs. Bheem somehow manages to defeat the guards and dons their clothes along with his friends and enters Sonapur pretending to be a bunch of Kaalsainiks. Soon another group of Kaalsainiks arrive and a sweet shop owner named Gulabchand figures out that Bheem and his team are not Kaalsainiks and manages to save the group. In the process, Bheem is wounded and faints while passing through the magical door. Upon regaining consciousness, he observes that Dholu-Bholu have regained their respective human forms. The sage who saves them, Guru Sambhu, tells them that despite being brave and strong, they cannot defeat Damyaan without magic. He then takes them to a magical place and teaches magic to the group. After completing their class on magic, he provides them with powers: Raju gets a magical bow and arrow which never misses its aim; Chutki gets two magical trees; Jaggu gets a bunch of magical stinging bananas; Kalia gets the power to become invisible; Dholu and Bholu get the power to replicate themselves and Bheem gets an hymn to seize the power of the enemy which was not decoded till date.

At night, they hear sounds of fireworks and celebrations, which are of the end of the second term of Damyaan's Kaalkriya, which involves trapping ghosts for their powers in three different rings in three terms by using the hymns given the Book of Magi. Bheem and his team are teleported to Damyaan's palace. Using their powers, they manage to seize the first ring, but while seizing the second ring, Kalia activates a trap which covers them in a strange gas. Upon recovering, Damyaan tells Bheem that his birthday gift will be- watching his friends die. In an instant, Bheem decodes the hymn and releases his friends. They fight and defeat the Kaalsainiks while Bheem defeats Damyaan in a fight without magic, seeks to rule the world. Bheem eventually thrashes Damyaan and kills him where he and his friends return to the future to Dholakpur, only to realise that the whole of Dholakpur has fixed a party for Bheem.

== Release ==
The film released on 18 May 2012.

== Reception ==
Ritu V Singh of News18 called the storyline and special effects of the film, "average".

Box Office India initially called it a "surprise success" but later labelled it as a "box office flop". The film grossed ₹55.1 million worldwide.

== Sequel and remake ==
A sequel titled Chhota Bheem and The Rise of Damyaan premiered on 27 October 2019 on Pogo TV.

A live-action remake was released on 31 May 2024.

== See also ==
- Indian animation industry
- List of Indian animated feature films
